= Dartmouth Bridge =

Bridge in Minneapolis, Minnesota

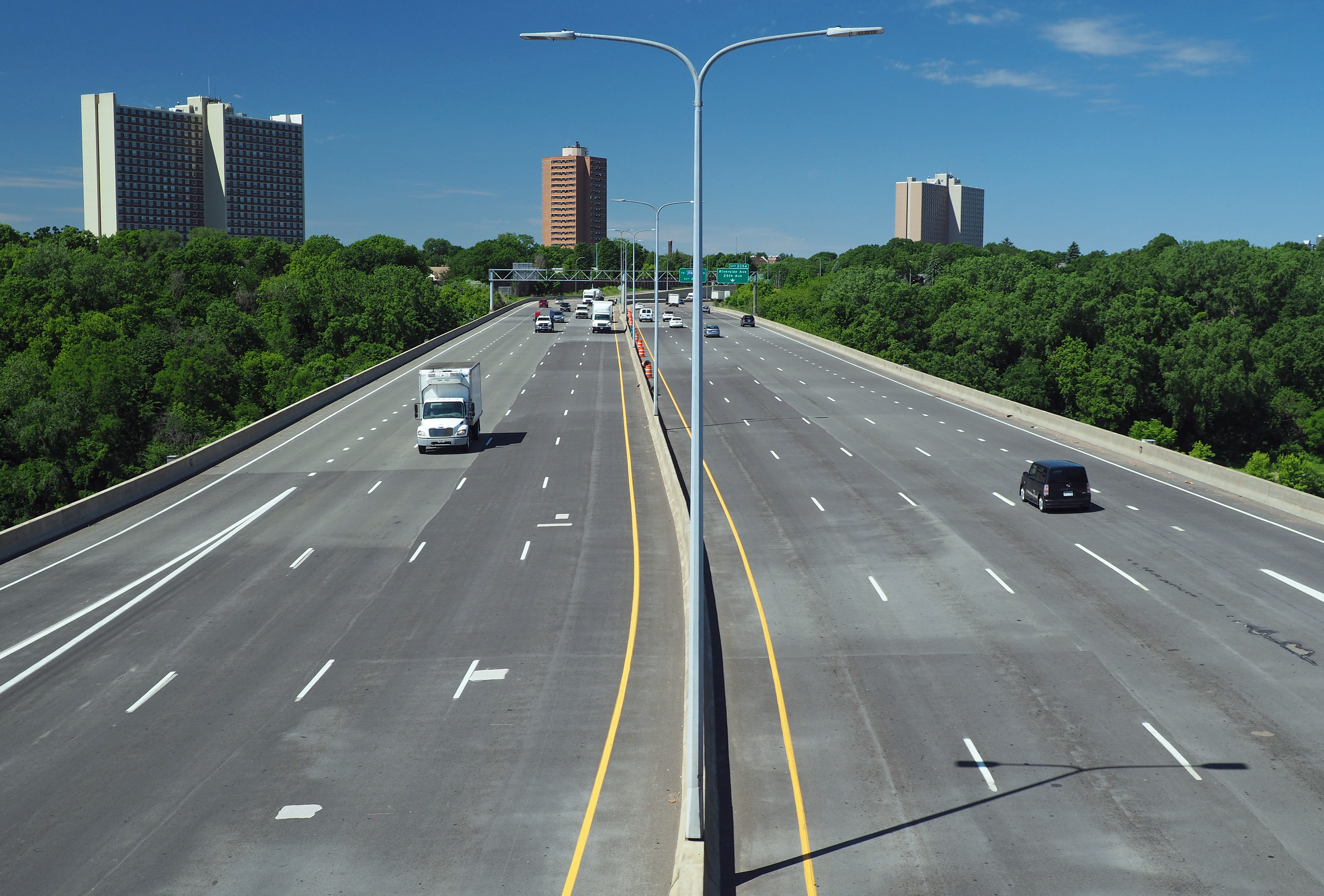
- Deck of the Dartmouth Bridge looking west toward central Minneapolis
- Coordinates: 44°57′58″N 93°13′34″W
- Carries: Ten lanes of I-94 / US 12 / US 52
- Crosses: Mississippi River
- Locale: Minneapolis, Minnesota
- Maintained by: Minnesota Department of Transportation
- ID number: 9350

Characteristics
- Design: Six-span welded steel girder
- Total length: 1001 feet
- Width: 141 feet
- Longest span: 340 feet
- Clearance below: 64 feet

History
- Opened: 1964 (replaced 1995)

Statistics
- Daily traffic: 167,000

The Dartmouth Bridge is a steel girder bridge that spans the Mississippi River in Minneapolis between the Cedar-Riverside area and the University of Minnesota campus area. It carries I-94/US 12/US 52. It was built in 1964 and was designed by Parsons Brinckerhoff, Quade and Douglas. It is named for its proximity to Dartmouth Avenue SE, just north of the bridge.

The original span was an uninspired girder bridge design when compared to other Mississippi River bridges in the vicinity. However, the bridge carries more vehicles than any other bridge in the state (167,000 vehicles daily), on Interstate 94 between downtown Minneapolis and Saint Paul. The 125-foot (38 m) long, 148-ton box girders were fabricated in Gary, Indiana and transported up the Mississippi River by barge in October 1963.

The original span was completely demolished and rebuilt in the mid-1990s. The current span uses a steel I-beam construction supported by two bridge piers. Prior to August 2007, the bridge carried four lanes of traffic in each direction. One of these lanes on each side is used for an entrance/exit lane for Huron Boulevard (East Bank) and Riverside Avenue (West Bank). Following the I-35W Mississippi River bridge collapse, through traffic was detoured along a three-mile (5 km) stretch of I-94 including this bridge before turning north on Minnesota State Highway 280. To support the extra traffic volume, the deck surface was repainted to temporarily carry five lanes in each direction including the auxiliary lanes. Due to favorable response, the additional lane was made permanent and currently remains in use.

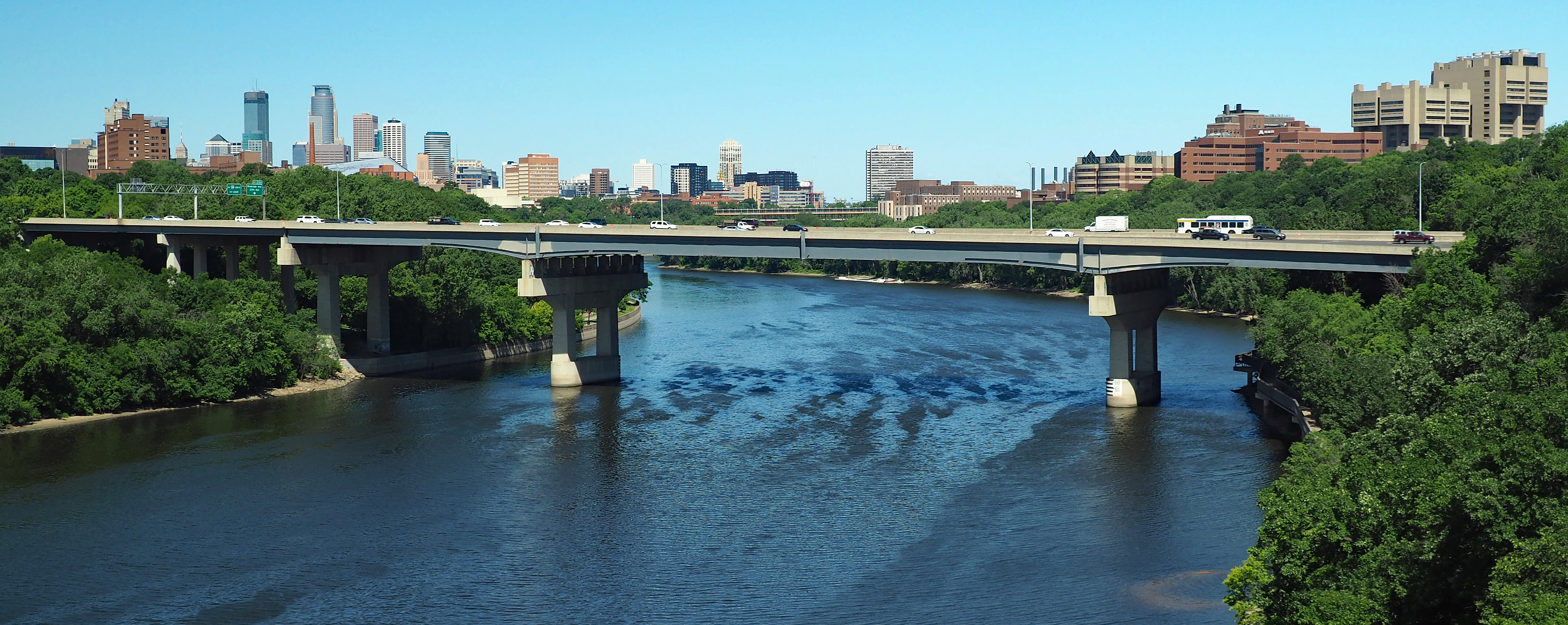
Dartmouth Bridge and the Mississippi River

== See also ==
- List of crossings of the Upper Mississippi River
