= Interstate 94 in Minnesota =

Interstate Highway in Minnesota, United States

Interstate 94
- Blue Star Memorial Highway; Purple Heart Trail
- I-94 highlighted in red

Route information
- Maintained by MnDOT
- Length: 259.49 mi (417.61 km)
- NHS: Entire route
- Restrictions: No hazardous goods allowed in the Lowry Hill Tunnel

Major junctions
- West end: I-94 / US 52 at the North Dakota state line in Moorhead
- US 75 at Moorhead; US 59 at Fergus Falls; US 71 at Sauk Centre; I-494 / I-694 at Maple Grove; US 169 at Brooklyn Park and Maple Grove; I-394 / US 12 at Minneapolis; I-35W at Minneapolis; I-35E / US 10 at St. Paul; US 10 / US 61 at St. Paul; I-494 / I-694 at Woodbury
- East end: I-94 / US 12 at the Wisconsin state line in Hudson

Location
- Country: United States
- State: Minnesota
- Counties: Clay, Wilkin, Otter Tail, Grant, Douglas, Todd, Stearns, Wright, Hennepin, Ramsey, Washington

Highway system
- Interstate Highway System; Main; Auxiliary; Suffixed; Business; Future; Minnesota Trunk Highway System; Interstate; US; State; Legislative; Scenic
← MN 93	→ MN 95

Interstate 94 (I-94) in the US state of Minnesota runs 259 miles (417 km) east–west through the central portion of the state. The highway connects the cities of Moorhead, Fergus Falls, Alexandria, Sauk Centre, St. Cloud, Monticello, Minneapolis, and Saint Paul. Authorized in 1956, it was mostly constructed in the 1960s. For its whole length, it runs concurrently with either US Highway 52 (US 52) or US 12.

== Route description ==
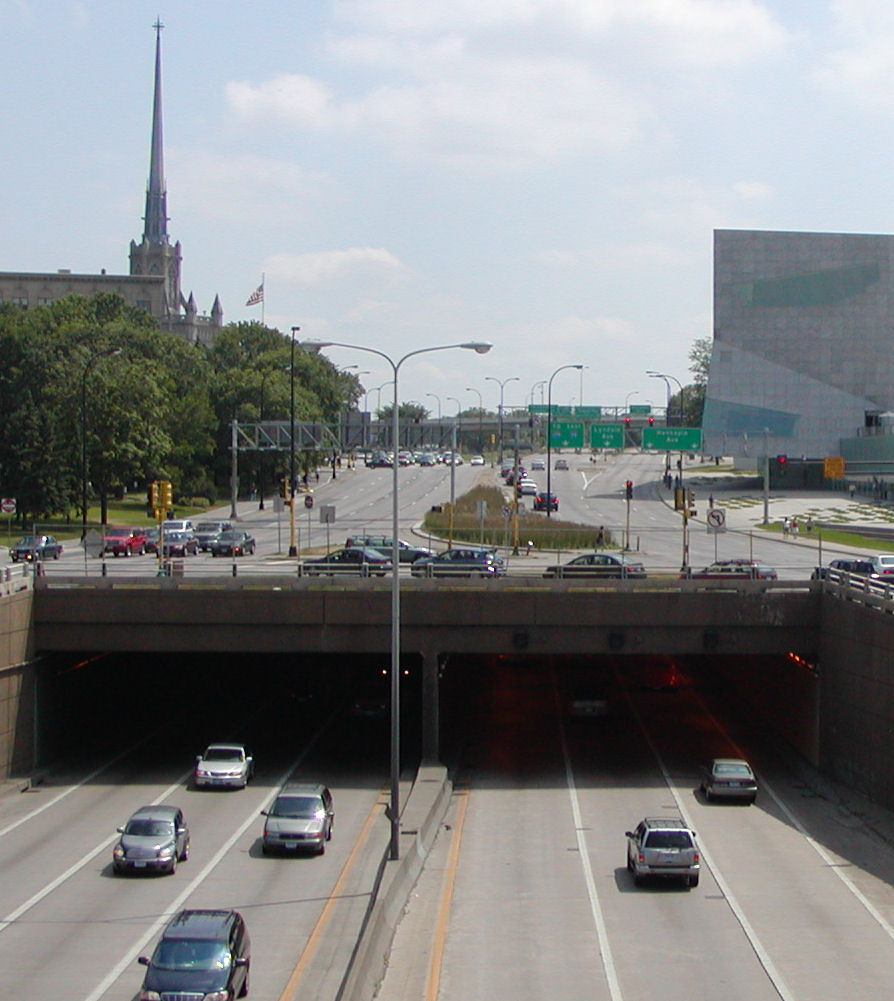
Lowry Hill Tunnel in Minneapolis

I-94 enters the state from North Dakota at the city of Moorhead and heads southeast after serving Moorhead.

Traveling southeast from Moorhead, there are several places where the elevation of I-94 rises slightly; these are "beaches" that formed as the glacial lake rose or fell. Finally, at Rothsay, I-94 climbs the last beach line and enters terrain more typical for Minnesota. From Rothsay to the Twin Cities, the terrain of I-94 is rolling with frequent lakes visible from the highway.

I-94 traverses by Fergus Falls, Alexandria, and Sauk Centre on its way to St. Cloud. The "original main street" in Sauk Centre near I-94 commemorates the Sinclair Lewis novel that skewered this town.

Monticello is roughly the midpoint exurb for both St. Cloud and Minneapolis. Between exits 201 (Albertville) and 194 (Monticello) sits the Minnesota Road Research Facility.

Upon arrival to the Twin Cities, I-94 first approaches Minneapolis from the north, then the highway turns east after passing through the Lowry Hill Tunnel and heads to Saint Paul while traveling east.

The road crosses the Mississippi River in Minneapolis between the Prospect Park and Seward neighborhoods. The highway joins Minneapolis and Saint Paul together where it meets Minnesota State Highway 280 (MN 280). In Saint Paul, the routing of I-94 is set through the historic Rondo neighborhood, which, prior to the highway's construction, was the largest Black community in Saint Paul.

Upon leaving Saint Paul, the route travels through suburban Washington County and exits the state into Wisconsin between Lakeland, Minnesota, and Hudson, Wisconsin, while crossing the St. Croix River.

Legally, the Minnesota section of I-94 is defined as unmarked Legislative Route 392 in the Minnesota Statutes § 161.12(4). I-94 is not marked with this legislative number along the actual highway.

=== Transit ===
Intercity bus service is provided along the entire length of the I-94 corridor. Service northwest of the Twin Cities is provided by Jefferson Lines, while Greyhound, Flixbus, and Wisconsin Coach Lines provide service east of the Twin Cities. Local bus services operated by Metro Transit and Maple Grove Transit also utilize I-94 in the Twin Cities metro.

== History ==
I-94 in Minnesota was authorized as part of the original Interstate System in 1956. It was mostly constructed in the 1960s.

I-94 follows the original route of old US Highway 52 (US 52) from Moorhead to St. Cloud, then I-94 stays south of the Mississippi River along the former route of old MN 152 between St. Cloud and the Twin Cities. I-94 then passes through both downtowns and exits toward Wisconsin along the former route of old US 12.

The first section of I-94 in Minnesota constructed was between Moorhead and Albany in the early 1960s, as an extension of the existing highway in North Dakota.

The section of I-94 between Minneapolis and Saint Paul was completed in 1968 and dedicated December 9. In the Twin Cities, the construction of the highway was politically charged. The highway was built primarily through many working-class and Black neighborhoods. In Saint Paul, the routing of I-94 displaced the historic Rondo Neighborhood, which, prior to the highway's construction, was the largest Black community in Saint Paul.

The section of I-94 between Maple Grove and Brooklyn Center was completed in 1969, between St. Augusta and Maple Grove in 1973 and between Albany and St. Augusta in 1977.

The section of I-94 from Brooklyn Center through north Minneapolis was completed in 1984. Like the Rondo neighborhood in the 1960s, this segment was through a primarily Black and working-class neighborhood.

The last section of I-94 in Minnesota constructed was the 10 miles (16 km) between its junction with I-494/I-694 at Woodbury and the Wisconsin state line at Lakeland. This was completed in 1985.

In 2004, a third lane was constructed between Brooklyn Boulevard at Brooklyn Center and Hemlock Lane at Maple Grove. This is located immediately east of the I-494/I-694/I-94 interchange in Maple Grove, also known locally as the Fish Lake Interchange.

From September 2007 to October 2008, the Minnesota Department of Transportation (MnDOT) added a temporary extra lane to I-94 between northbound I-35W and MN 280 in the Twin Cities to help relieve traffic congestion caused by the collapse of the I-35W Mississippi River bridge. As a result, this portion of I-94 was not up to Interstate Highway standards during this time period.

=== Rethinking I-94 ===
In 2016, MnDOT launched a project known as Rethinking I-94, which is ostensibly aimed at reconnecting neighborhoods, revitalizing communities, and ensuring that residents have a voice in transportation decisions, though it has been criticized as perpetuating the same mistakes of the past. The construction of I-94 between Minneapolis and Saint Paul was controversial and has been a political debate for many years. MnDOT was considering reconnecting those neighborhoods that were destroyed and separated in 1960, but axed the option of replacing the grade-separated highway with an at-grade boulevard in 2025.

== Exit list ==
County	Location	mi	km	Exit	Destinations	Notes
Red River of the North		0.000	0.000		I-94 west / US 52 west – Fargo, Valley City, Bismarck	Continuation into North Dakota
Red River of the North		0.000	0.000	North Dakota–Minnesota state line		
Clay	Moorhead	0.577	0.929	1A	US 75 – Moorhead, Breckenridge	Breckenridge only signed eastbound; also access to Heritage-Hjemkomst Center, Concordia College, Minnesota State University, Bluestem Trollwood
Clay	Moorhead	1.538	2.475	1B	20th Street	Eastbound exit and westbound entrance only
Clay	Moorhead	2.709	4.360	2	I-94 BL west (34th Street) / CSAH 52 (Main Avenue Southeast)	Signed as exits 2A (Main Avenue Southeast) and 2B (34th Street) eastbound
Clay	Glyndon Township	6.075	9.777	6	MN 336 / CSAH 11 – Sabin	Sabin only signed eastbound; also access to US 10, Detroit Lakes, Airport, Glyndon, Dilworth
Clay	Elkton Township	15.239	24.525	15	CSAH 10 – Downer, Sabin	Sabin only signed westbound
Clay	Barnesville–Humboldt township line	22.700	36.532	22	MN 9 – Barnesville	Barnesville only signed eastbound
Clay	Barnesville	24.542	39.497	24	MN 34 – Detroit Lakes, Barnesville	Detroit Lakes only signed eastbound and Barnesville only signed westbound
Wilkin	Prairie View Township	32.500	52.304	32	MN 108 / CSAH 30 – Pelican Rapids	Access to Maplewood State Park
Wilkin–Otter Tail county line	Rothsay	38.226	61.519	38	Rothsay	
Otter Tail	Fergus Falls Township	50.479– 50.899	81.238– 81.914	50	US 59 north / CSAH 88 – Fergus Falls, Pelican Rapids, Detroit Lakes	Northern end of US 59 concurrency; Fergus Falls only signed eastbound, and Pelican Rapids/Detroit Lakes only signed westbound
Otter Tail	Fergus Falls	54.167	87.173	54	MN 210 west – Fergus Falls, Breckenridge	Western end of MN 210 concurrency; also access to Lincoln Avenue, Airport, Central Lakes State Trail
Otter Tail	Fergus Falls	55.860	89.898	55	CSAH 1 – Fergus Falls, Wendell	Wendell only signed eastbound
Otter Tail	Buse Township	57.888	93.162	57	MN 210 east / CSAH 25 – Fergus Falls	Eastern end of MN 210 concurrency; also access to Lake Region Hospital
Otter Tail	Buse–Dane Prairie township line	61.677	99.260	61	US 59 south / CSAH 82 – Elbow Lake, Fergus Falls	Southern end of US 59 concurrency; Elbow Lake only signed eastbound, and Fergus Falls only signed westbound
Otter Tail	Tumuli Township	67.624	108.830	67	CSAH 35 – Dalton	
Grant	Pelican Lake Township	77.099	124.079	77	MN 78 / CSAH 10 – Ashby, Barrett	Also access to Battle Lake, Prairie Ridge Hospital
Douglas	Evansville Township	82.908	133.427	82	MN 79 west / CSAH 41 – Evansville, Elbow Lake	
Douglas	Brandon Township	90.096	144.995	90	CSAH 7 – Brandon	Access to ski area
Douglas	La Grand Township	97.415	156.774	97	MN 114 south / CSAH 40 – Garfield, Lowry	
Douglas	Alexandria	100.685	162.037	100	MN 27 west / CSAH 46 – Alexandria	Western end of MN 27 concurrency; Alexandria only signed eastbound; also access to Alomere Health Hospital
Douglas	Alexandria	103.037	165.822	103	MN 29 – Alexandria, Glenwood	Also access to Alexandria Tech & Community College, Central Lakes State Trail, Alomere Health Hospital, Alexandria Regional Airport
Douglas	Orange Township	114.361	184.046	114	MN 27 east / CSAH 3 – Osakis, Westport	Eastern end of MN 27 concurrency; also access to Central Lakes State Trail, former MN 127
Todd	West Union Township	119.148	191.750	119	CSAH 46 – West Union	
Stearns	Sauk Centre Township	124.730	200.733	124	CSAH 72 (Sinclair Lewis Avenue)	Eastbound exit and westbound entrance only
Stearns	Sauk Centre	127.179	204.675	127	US 71 / MN 28 – Sauk Centre, Willmar, Glenwood	Willmar only signed eastbound, Glenwood only signed westbound; also access to Sauk Centre Hospital, Airport
Stearns	Melrose Township	131.079	210.951	131	MN 4 south – Meire Grove, Paynesville	
Stearns	Melrose	134.974	217.220	135	CSAH 13 – Melrose	Also access to Melrose Area Hospital
Stearns	Oak Township	137.864	221.871	137	CSAH 12 / CSAH 65 – New Munich	former MN 237
Stearns	Freeport	140.865	226.700	140	CSAH 11 – Freeport	
Stearns	Albany	146.916	236.438	147	MN 238 / CSAH 10 – Albany	
Stearns	Avon	153.313	246.733	153	CSAH 9 – Avon	Also access to Holdingford
Stearns	Avon Township	156.531	251.912	156	CR 159 – St. John's University	
Stearns	St. Joseph Township	158.142	254.505	158	CSAH 75 – St. Cloud	Eastbound exit and westbound entrance only; also access to St. Cloud Hospital
Stearns	St. Joseph Township	160.436	258.197	160	CSAH 2 – St. Joseph, Cold Spring	Access to College of St. Benedict
Stearns	St. Joseph Township	164.514	264.760	164	MN 23 – St. Cloud, Rockville, Waite Park, Paynesville	Signed as "St. Cloud, Rockville" eastbound and "Waite Park, Paynesville" westbound
Stearns	St. Cloud	167.137	268.981	167	MN 15 – St. Cloud, Kimball	Signed as exits 167A (south) and 167B (north); also access to Waite Park, VA Medical Center
Stearns	St. Cloud	171.223	275.557	171	CSAH 75 – St. Augusta, St. Cloud	Also access to St. Cloud Hospital, St. Cloud State University
Stearns	St. Cloud	173.674	279.501	173	Opportunity Drive (CSAH 75)	
Wright	Clearwater	178.953	287.997	178	MN 24 – Clearwater, Annandale	Also access to Clear Lake
Wright	Silver Creek Township	184.131	296.330	183	CSAH 8 – Hasty, Silver Creek	Also access to Maple Lake
Wright	Monticello	194.075	312.333	193	MN 25 – Monticello, Buffalo	Also access to Big Lake, Lake Maria State Park
Wright	Monticello	195.577	314.751	194	CSAH 18 / CSAH 39 – Monticello	Also access to Monticello Hospital
Wright	Albertville	201.939	324.989	201	CSAH 19 – Albertville, St. Michael	Eastbound exit is a collector–distributor ramp for exits 201 and 202, access to Outlet Center
Wright	Albertville	202.693	326.203	202	CSAH 37 – Albertville	Westbound exit is a distributor ramp for exits 202 and 201 and signed as 202&201, access to Outlet Center
Wright	St. Michael	205.679	331.008	205	MN 241 west / CSAH 36 – St. Michael	Separate exit ramps westbound; Signed as 205A (MN 241) and 205B (CR 36)
Hennepin	Rogers	208.352	335.310	207	MN 101 (North Bypass) / CSAH 81 – Elk River, Rogers	Westbound exit signed as 207A (south CR 81 and north MN 101) and 207B (north MN 101 flyover ramp bypassing Diamond Lake Road); eastbound signed as exits 207A and 207B; also access to Otsego
Hennepin	Dayton			210	Dayton Parkway	Diverging diamond interchange opened November 5, 2021
Hennepin	Maple Grove			212A	MN 610 east	Eastbound exit and westbound entrance; opened December 2016
Hennepin	Maple Grove			212B	Rush Creek Boulevard	Westbound exit and eastbound entrance; opened November 2025
Hennepin	Maple Grove	214.367	344.990	213	CSAH 121 (Maple Grove Parkway)	
Hennepin	Maple Grove	216.326	348.143	215	CSAH 109 (Weaver Lake Road)	
Hennepin	Maple Grove	216.990– 217.593	349.212– 350.182	216	I-494 south / I-694 east	Western end of I-694 concurrency; I-494/I-694 exit 27
Hennepin	Maple Grove	218.084	350.972	28	CSAH 61 (Hemlock Lane)	
Hennepin	Maple Grove–Brooklyn Park city line	219.603	353.417	29	US 169	Signed as exits 29A (south) and 29B (north)
Hennepin	Brooklyn Park	220.153	354.302	30	Boone Avenue	
Hennepin	Brooklyn Park	221.078	355.791	31	CSAH 81 (Bottineau Boulevard)	
Hennepin	Brooklyn Center	223.103	359.049	33	CSAH 152 (Brooklyn Boulevard)	
Hennepin	Brooklyn Center	224.258	360.908	34	Shingle Creek Parkway to MN 100	
Hennepin	Brooklyn Center	223.816– 225.620	360.197– 363.100	225	I-694 east / MN 252 north	Eastern end of I-694 concurrency, I-694 exit 35B; Minneapolis–St. Paul Bypass
Hennepin	Minneapolis	226.350– 227.351	364.275– 365.886	226	53rd Avenue North/49th Avenue North	
Hennepin	Minneapolis	228.519	367.766	228	Dowling Avenue North	
Hennepin	Minneapolis	230.246– 230.590	370.545– 371.099	229	CSAH 81 west (West Broadway Avenue) / CSAH 66 / CSAH 152 (North Washington Avenue)	Washington Avenue not signed eastbound
Hennepin	Minneapolis	231.350	372.322	230	MN 55 west (Olson Memorial Highway) / 4th Street North/7th Street North	Western end of MN 55 concurrency
Hennepin	Minneapolis	231.929– 232.234	373.254– 373.744	231A	I-394 / US 12 west	Western end of US 12 concurrency; no access to I-394 east; I-394 exit 8B
Hennepin	Minneapolis	232.403– 232.688	374.016– 374.475	Lowry Hill Tunnel		
Hennepin	Minneapolis	232.862	374.755	231B	CSAH 22 south (Lyndale Avenue) / Hennepin Avenue	Virginia Triangle
Hennepin	Minneapolis	233.609	375.957	233B	I-35W south	Eastbound exit and westbound entrance; I-35W exit 16A; access via old MN 65
Hennepin	Minneapolis	233.737	376.163	233A	11th Street	Westbound exit and eastbound entrance
Hennepin	Minneapolis	233.696	376.097	233C	I-35W north	Eastbound exit and westbound entrance; I-35W exit 16A
Hennepin	Minneapolis				5th Avenue	Eastbound entrance only
Hennepin	Minneapolis	233.904	376.432	233B	I-35W south	Westbound exit and eastbound entrance; I-35W exit 16B
Hennepin	Minneapolis	234.473	377.348	234A	MN 55 east (Hiawatha Avenue)	Eastern end of MN 55 concurrency
Hennepin	Minneapolis	234.473	377.348	234B	7th Street	Westbound exit and eastbound entrance only
Hennepin	Minneapolis	234.730	377.761	234C	CSAH 152 (Cedar Avenue)	Access eastbound to Cedar Ave via MN 55 east; Cedar Avenue not signed eastbound
Hennepin	Minneapolis	235.296– 235.433	378.672– 378.893	235A	25th Avenue / Riverside Avenue	Access to Augsburg University, M Health Fairview
Hennepin	Minneapolis	235.716– 235.906	379.348– 379.654	Dartmouth Bridge over the Mississippi River		
Hennepin	Minneapolis	235.951– 236.085	379.726– 379.942	235B	Huron Boulevard	
Ramsey	Saint Paul	237.081	381.545	236	MN 280 / University Avenue/Pelham Boulevard	
Ramsey	Saint Paul	237.757	382.633	237	Cretin Avenue/Vandalia Street	
Ramsey	Saint Paul	239.065	384.738	238	MN 51 / Snelling Avenue	Access to Allianz Field, Concordia Univ., Minnesota State Fairgrounds
Ramsey	Saint Paul	239.564	385.541	239A	Hamline Avenue	Westbound exit only
Ramsey	Saint Paul	240.063	386.344	239B	CSAH 51 (Lexington Parkway)	
Ramsey	Saint Paul	241.059	387.947	240	CSAH 53 (Dale Street)	
Ramsey	Saint Paul	241.868	389.249	241A	CSAH 56 north (Marion Street) / Kellogg Boulevard – State Capitol	Access to Saint Paul College; Kellogg Boulevard not signed westbound
Ramsey	Saint Paul	242.040	389.526	241B	10th Street / 5th Street	Eastbound exit and westbound entrance; access to Regions Hospital
Ramsey	Saint Paul	242.045	389.534	242A	12th Street – State Capitol	Westbound exit and eastbound entrance only; access to Regions Hospital
Ramsey	Saint Paul	242.252– 242.554	389.867– 390.353	241C	I-35E south	Western end of I-35E concurrency; westbound exit and eastbound entrance only; I-35E exit 107B
Ramsey	Saint Paul	242.768– 243.146	390.697– 391.306	242B	I-35E north / US 10 west	Eastern end of I-35E concurrency; western end of US 10 concurrency; I-35E exit 107A
Ramsey	Saint Paul	243.067	391.178	242C	MN 5 (7th Street)	Eastbound exit only
Ramsey	Saint Paul	243.448	391.792	242D	US 52 south / 6th Street	Eastern end of US 52 concurrency; 6th Street not signed eastbound
Ramsey	Saint Paul	244.070	392.793	243	US 61 north (Mounds Boulevard) / Kellogg Boulevard	Western end of US 61 concurrency; Kellogg Boulevard not signed eastbound
Ramsey	Saint Paul	245.566	395.200	244	US 10 east / US 61 south	Eastern end of US 10/US 61 concurrency
Ramsey	Saint Paul	246.370	396.494	245	CSAH 65 (White Bear Avenue)	
Ramsey	Saint Paul	246.866	397.292	246A	Ruth Street	Eastbound exit and westbound entrance only
Ramsey	Saint Paul–Maplewood city line	247.370	398.103	246	CSAH 68 (McKnight Road)	
Ramsey	Maplewood	248.328	399.645	247	MN 120 north / CSAH 23 south / Century Avenue	
Washington	Woodbury–Oakdale city line	249.449– 249.848	401.449– 402.091	249	I-494 south / I-694 north	Minneapolis–St. Paul Bypass via I-694
Washington	Woodbury–Lake Elmo city line	250.838	403.685	250	CSAH 13 (Inwood Avenue, Radio Drive)	
Washington	Woodbury–Lake Elmo city line	251.378	404.554	251	CSAH 19 (Keats Avenue, Woodbury Drive)	
Washington	Woodbury–Lake Elmo city line	253.377	407.771	253	MN 95 south / CSAH 15 (Manning Avenue)	Western end of MN 95 concurrency
Washington	Lakeland	258.918	416.688	258	MN 95 north / CSAH 18 – Stillwater	Eastern end of MN 95 concurrency
St. Croix River		259.663	417.887	Minnesota–Wisconsin state line		
St. Croix River		259.663	417.887		I-94 east / US 12 east – Eau Claire	Continuation into Wisconsin
1.000 mi = 1.609 km; 1.000 km = 0.621 mi: Concurrency terminus; Incomplete access

== Auxiliary routes ==
- I-394, direct link between Minneapolis and western suburbs
- I-494, southern/western portion of beltway loop
- I-694, northern/eastern portion of beltway loop

Interstate 94
Previous state: North Dakota	Minnesota	Next state: Wisconsin
