= E-ZPass Minnesota =

Toll-lane and electronic toll system

E-ZPass Minnesota, formerly MnPass, is the brand name associated with a series of high occupancy toll lanes (HO/T lanes) and electronic toll collection (ETC) system in the Minneapolis-St. Paul Metropolitan Area of Minnesota. The lanes and the ETC system are owned by the Minnesota Department of Transportation (MnDOT) and fully compatible with the multi-state E-ZPass network.

Solo drivers who are registered under the E-ZPass program and have a toll transponder are allowed to pay a toll to use the lanes during operating hours. Vehicles with two or more occupants, buses, and motorcycles may use the lanes for free without requiring a toll transponder.

== Transponders ==
The primary device is a switchable tag. The switchable tag allows users to switch between HOV mode (where using the lanes is free) and solo mode (where users must pay the toll to use the lanes). The current transponder is a rebranded E-ZPass Flex tag which is also used in other states.

A license plate tag is available for vehicles that have a metallic tint on their windshield that would prevent the E-ZPass equipment from reading the tag. There is a $15 one-time fee for the license plate tag, which otherwise functions the same as the sticker tag.

The initial minimum prepaid amount for a E-ZPass Minnesota account is $25, plus the cost of an transponder type if applicable.

Small commercial vehicles that are no more than two axles and weigh less than 26,000 pounds (12,000 kg) are eligible to register for a E-ZPass account and transponder. Commercial vehicles with more than two axles or weigh more than 26,000 pounds (12,000 kg) are prohibited from having a transponder, but may still use the E-ZPass lanes when the lanes are free and open to all traffic.

Until August 2, 2021, the MnPASS system was not interoperable with other transponder-based toll systems, such as E-ZPass, I-Pass, or FasTrak. E-ZPass became interoperable with the MnPASS system starting on August 2, 2021, and MnPass was rebranded as E-ZPass Minnesota. Existing MnPASS holders are allowed to keep their tags or trade them for E-ZPass tags, and existing MnPASS transponders continue to function on Minnesota express lanes (but not on other states' toll roads).

Before joining the E-ZPass system in 2021, a sticker tag was the default tag, and was provided for free. Existing sticker tag transponders are still valid in Minnesota but cannot be used outside of the state. Applied to the inside of the windshield it is not transferable and is always active.

== Toll rates ==
During E-ZPass Minnesota operating hours, tolls for the E-ZPass lanes range from $0.25 to $8. The actual toll level depends on the volume of traffic. Higher volumes of traffic usually result in higher toll levels. Electronic sensors monitor the traffic density and tolls are changed every three minutes. The variable tolls are intended to keep traffic in the E-ZPass lanes moving between 50 and 55 miles per hour (80 and 89 km/h).

Outside of operating hours, there is no toll and the lanes are free (signed simply as "OPEN") and open to all traffic (regardless of whether they have a transponder or not) with one exception: the reversible E-ZPass lanes on Interstate 394 (I-394) between Minnesota State Highway 100 (MN 100) and I-94 always has a minimum $0.25 toll and thus are not open to solo drivers without a E-ZPass transponder.

== I-394/U.S. Highway 12 ==
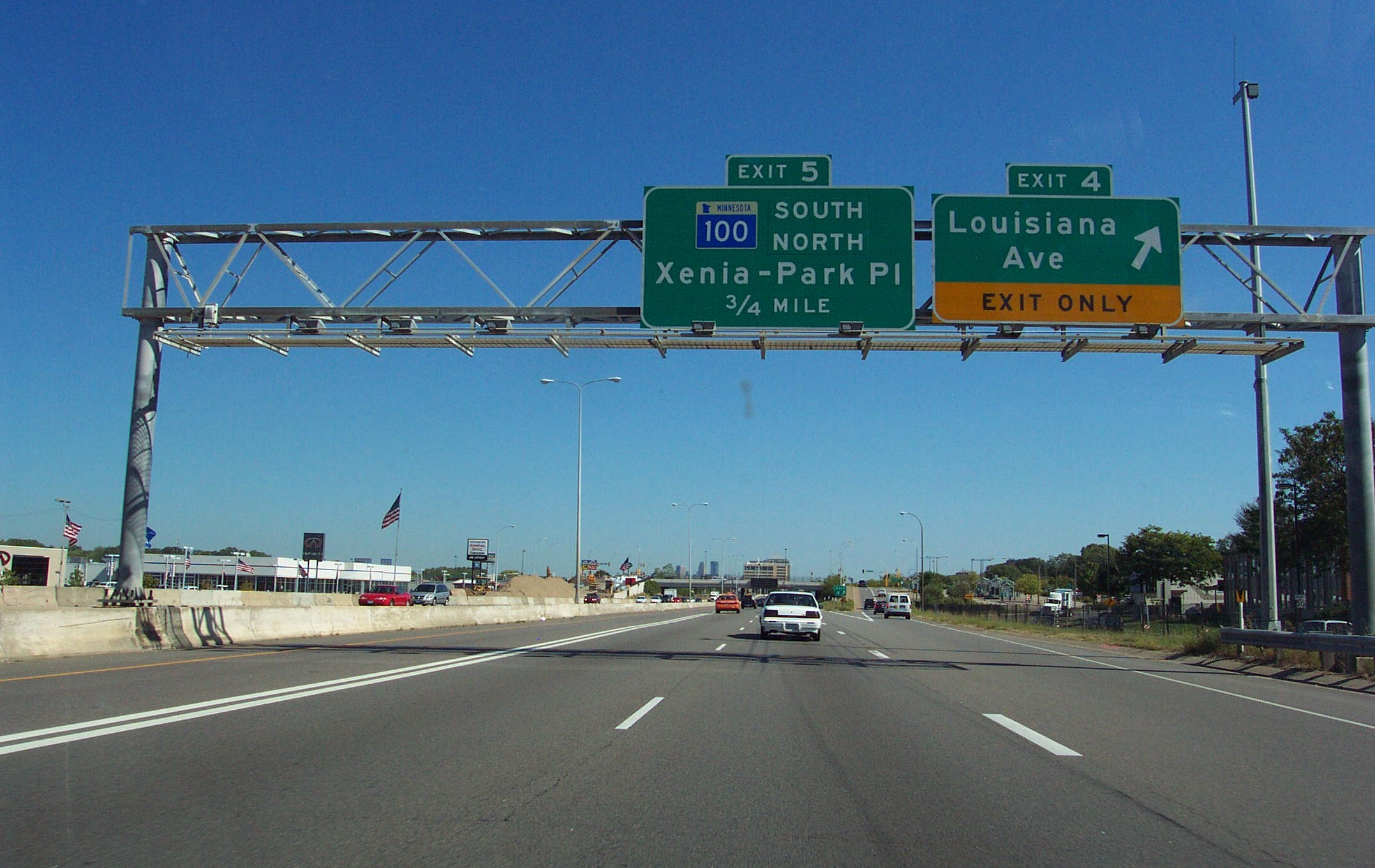
I-394 heading eastbound toward downtown Minneapolis; notice the toll lane to the left.

The I-394 MnPASS lanes opened in May 2005 and were the first such lanes in Minnesota. The lanes were converted from the previous high-occupancy vehicle lanes that were constructed with I-394 in the 1980s and early 1990s.

West of the Xenia/Park Place interchange (just west of MN 100, the E-ZPass lanes function as concurrent flow lanes, utilizing the inside/left lane in each direction. These lanes are separated from the general purpose lanes only by lane striping, as are the I-35W and I-35E E-ZPass lanes. The lane striping ranges from a single dashed white line where lane changes (and E-ZPass lane access) is allowed to double solid white lines where lane changing is prohibited.

The westbound E-ZPass lane ends at the I-494 overpass, continuing west of I-494 as a general purpose lane. The eastbound E-ZPass lane begins at the County Road 15 (CR 15) interchange on U.S. Highway 12 (US 12) in Wayzata. These concurrent flow E-ZPass lanes are tolled eastbound between 6 and 10 am weekdays and westbound between 3 and 7 pm weekdays. They are open to all traffic at all other times.

East of the Xenia/Park Place interchange, the E-ZPass lanes transition to a pair of median-running reversible lanes that are physically separated from the general purpose lanes by a concrete barrier. These lanes extend to the edge of downtown Minneapolis before ending and merging into the I-394 mainline at I-94. Intermediate access to these reversible E-ZPass lane is limited to MN 100, the south frontage road at MN 100, Dunwoody Boulevard/Van White Boulevard, and I-94 in the direction of the Lowry Hill Tunnel. The lanes are open eastbound (towards downtown) from 6am to 1pm daily, and westbound (away from downtown) daily from 2pm to 5am the following morning. Hours may vary due to special events or maintenance activities.

There were a total of over 1.3 million tolled trips taken in the I-394 MnPASS lanes in 2017.

== I-35W ==
The E-ZPass lanes along I-35W south of downtown Minneapolis were opened in stages between 2009 and 2011 and are a combination of new construction (south of Burnsville Parkway), conversion of the previously existing high-occupancy vehicle lanes (between Burnsville Parkway and 66th Street), construction related to the Crosstown Commons project, and conversion of a median shoulder into a priced dynamic shoulder lane.

The lanes are concurrent-flow lanes using the inside/left lane in each direction. The northbound E-ZPass lane begins at CR 42 and extends continuously to 26th Street. The southbound E-ZPass Lane begins at 26th Street and extends to Cliff Road. The northbound E-ZPass lane is tolled weekdays between 6 and 10 am and the segment north of MN 62 is also tolled between 3 and 7 pm. The southbound E-ZPass lane is tolled weekdays between 3 and 7 pm with the segment between 42nd Street and I-494 also tolled between 6 and 10 am. The lanes are open to all traffic at all other times.

E-ZPass lanes on I-35W between County Road C in Roseville and Lexington Avenue in Blaine were opened in 2021.

Almost 950,000 tolled trips were taken in the I-35W MnPASS lanes in 2017.

The Orange Line bus rapid transitway utilizes the I-35W MnPASS lanes.

== I-35E ==
The I-35E E-ZPass lanes are the first such lanes in the eastern half of the Minneapolis-St. Paul Metropolitan Area. These are concurrent-flow lanes, using the inside/left lane in each direction. The lanes were opened from Cayuga Street (north edge of downtown St. Paul) to Little Canada Road in December 2015 and were added as part of a full reconstruction project.

In December 2016, the southbound E-ZPass lane was extended to begin at CR 96, while a separate northbound E-ZPass Lane was added between CR E (north of I-694) and CR J (at the Ramsey–Anoka county line. The two northbound E-ZPass lanes are tolled weekdays between 3 and 7 pm, while the southbound E-ZPass lane is tolled weekdays between 6 and 10 am. The lanes are open to all traffic at all other times.

Approximately 440,000 tolled trips were taken in the I-35E MnPASS lanes in 2017.

== I-494 ==
The I-494 E-ZPass lanes are yet to be constructed, but will be constructed between 2023 and 2026. Westbound there will be a E-ZPass lane from MN 77 to I-35W, and eastbound from France Avenue to MN 77. The project is part of a major corridor study happening on I-494.

== Future E-ZPass Minnesota lanes ==
MnDOT is currently studying the I-94 corridor between downtown Minneapolis and downtown St. Paul. No recommendations have come out of this study yet as of April 2018. However, the corridor is listed as a Tier 1 Corridor for E-ZPass implementation by the Metropolitan Council, the region's metropolitan planning organization.

MnDOT is currently studying the US 169 corridor between MN 41 near Shakopee and MN 55 in Plymouth. E-ZPass lanes are one of the options being considered.
