= Central Lakes State Trail =

Rail trail in Minnesota, U.S.

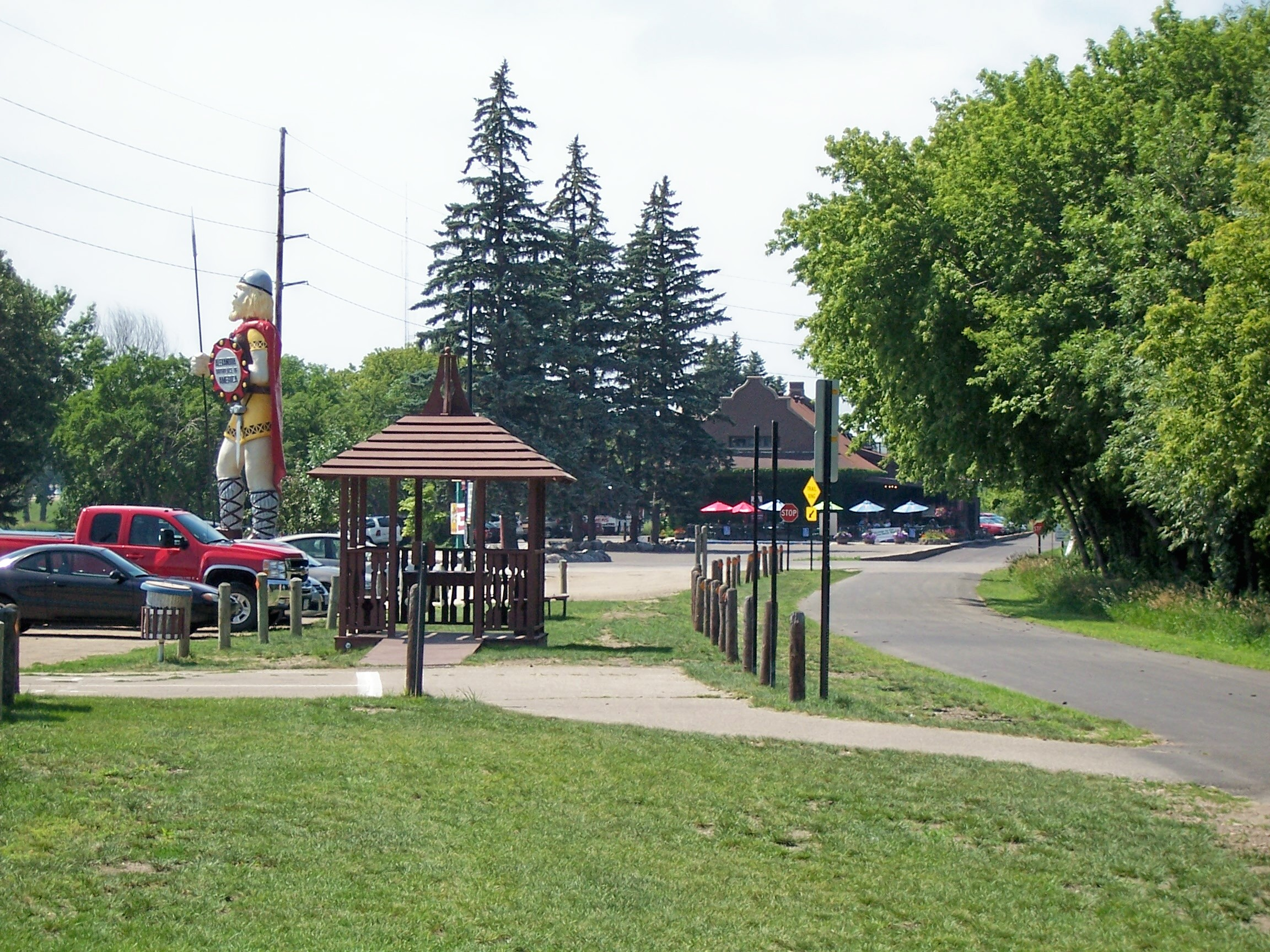
- The trail passing through Alexandria by the statue of Big Ole the Viking, near the Kensington Runestone Museum
- Length: 55 mi (89 km)
- Location: Central Minnesota, USA
- Designation: Minnesota state trail
- Trailheads: Fergus Falls; Osakis
- Use: Biking, hiking, in-line skating, snowmobiling
- Grade: Nearly level
- Difficulty: Easy
- Season: Year-round
- Sights: Christina Lake, Alexandria, Lake Osakis
- Hazards: Road crossings, severe weather
- Surface: Asphalt
- Website: Central Lakes State Trail

The Central Lakes State Trail is a paved recreational rail trail in central Minnesota, United States, running along a former Burlington Northern Railroad line. The trail is marked with mileposts every mile, corresponding with the mile markers of the former railroad line. Snowmobile use is allowed on the trail in winter, conditions permitting.

== Description of the trail ==
The 55-mile (89 km) trail begins in Osakis at the western end of the Lake Wobegon Trail and runs parallel to Interstate 94 before ending in Fergus Falls. This trail passes through the towns of Nelson, Alexandria, Garfield, Brandon, Evanston, Melby, Ashby, and Dalton. The Central Lakes and Lake Wobegon trails combine for a continuous 117-mile (188 km) trail.
