= Larpenteur Avenue =

Road in Minnesota, United States

Coordinates: 44°59′30″N 93°9′15″W

Larpenteur Avenue (Ramsey County Road 30) is a main thoroughfare in Ramsey County, Minnesota, United States. Originally named Minneapolis Avenue, it was renamed by the Saint Paul City Council in 1904 in honor of Auguste Louis Larpenteur, a fur trader and one of the original 12 citizens in the city of Saint Paul. The west end of Larpenteur Avenue is at the border with Hennepin County in Lauderdale, immediately west of Minnesota State Highway 280. Larpenteur continues east from Lauderdale through the cities of Falcon Heights, Roseville, and Saint Paul, where it is an exit off of Interstate 35E and bisected by Lake Phalen to the east. It ends at Minnesota State Highway 120 (Century Avenue North) in Maplewood at the border of Washington County.

Larpenteur Avenue forms the boundary between the city of Saint Paul and its northern suburbs. Larpenteur Avenue runs along the south side of the Les Bolstad Golf Course at the University of Minnesota and passes through the agricultural research fields on the north side of the University's Saint Paul Campus in Falcon Heights. Larpenteur Avenue continues west from Lauderdale into Minneapolis as Hennepin Avenue. Positionally, Larpenteur Avenue serves as "County Road A" and Roselawn Avenue as "County Road A2" in the Ramsey County's "Lettered County Roads".
