= Minnesota State Highway 280 =

State highway in Minnesota, United States

Trunk Highway 280
- MN 280 highlighted in red

Route information
- Maintained by MnDOT
- Length: 3.710 mi (5.971 km)
- Existed: 1959–present

Major junctions
- South end: I-94 / US 12 / US 52 in Saint Paul
- North end: I-35W / MN 36 in Roseville

Location
- Country: United States
- State: Minnesota
- Counties: Ramsey

Highway system
- Minnesota Trunk Highway System; Interstate; US; State; Legislative; Scenic
← MN 277	→ MN 282

Minnesota State Highway 280 (MN 280) is a 3.710-mile-long (5.971 km) highway in the Twin Cities region of Minnesota that travels from its Interchange with Interstate 94/U.S.Route 12/US Route 52 (I-94/US 12/US 52) in Saint Paul to its interchange with I-35W in Roseville.

MN 280 is an important connector route because the junction of I-94/US 12/US 52 and I-35W in nearby downtown Minneapolis is not a complete interchange.

== Route description ==
MN 280 serves as a north–south route along the western edge of Ramsey County, between the city of Saint Paul and suburban Roseville. The highway passes through the small city of Lauderdale between Saint Paul and Roseville. MN 280 is largely built on a slope, providing an excellent view of downtown Minneapolis to the west, particularly for southbound vehicles.

The route has a 55-mile-per-hour (89 km/h) posted speed limit over its entire length, except for at the intersection with Broadway St. NE where the limit is 50-mile-per-hour (80 km/h).

MN 280 is built to freeway standards from its interchange with I-94/US 12/US 52 to its interchange with East Hennepin Avenue/Larpenteur Avenue, although the entrance and exit ramps at Como Avenue are rather tight. This section of the route has auxiliary lanes between University Avenue and the Kasota Avenue/Energy Park Drive exit. There is a signal-controlled intersection at Broadway Street NE on southbound MN 280 only. The MN 280/I-35W interchange in Roseville is incomplete, so traffic from MN 280 northbound cannot reach I-35W southbound without using intersecting surface streets, and the same is true for northbound I-35W traffic attempting to reach southbound MN 280.

== History ==
MN 280 was authorized on July 1, 1949, but construction did not begin until 1955. It was completed between MN 36 and Kasota Avenue in 1959 and to University Avenue (at that time, US 12, US 52, MN 56, and MN 218) in 1961. The highway was linked to I-94 in 1968 upon the freeway's completion between Minneapolis and St. Paul.

South of Como Avenue, MN 280 was widened and its ramps improved in the mid-1990s. The Larpenteur Avenue/East Hennepin Avenue interchange in Lauderdale was reconstructed in 2009 to eliminate the tight, no-acceleration-lane ramps. The intersection at County Road B was also closed permanently in 2009, as were the unsignaled intersections at Roselawn Avenue and Walnut Street. With construction completed in December 2009, the signal at Broadway Street was modified to allow left turns from northbound MN 280, thus maintaining a stoplight for southbound MN 280 only, but Broadway Street traffic can now only turn south. Thus, MN 280 is now in a sense a northbound freeway only, with a single stoplight for southbound traffic.

The 2009 construction project also rehabilitated the concrete pavement between I-94 and Territorial Road. The project also included replacement of the BNSF Railroad bridge on Larpenteur Avenue west of MN 280; placement of a new median on MN 280 from south of Como Avenue to Larpenteur Avenue; and noise walls along MN 280's east side.

MN 280 was originally proposed (in the 1960s) to continue farther, turning westward south of its I-94 junction in Saint Paul, and then continuing west into Minneapolis as a freeway running roughly along 28th Street. The route would have continued westbound to about France Avenue South. That freeway was never built, and the ramp stubs at Saint Paul's I-94/MN 280 junction were removed in the early 1980s.

=== Detour route for I-35W ===
Because of the I-35W Mississippi River Bridge Collapse in nearby Minneapolis on August 1, 2007, MN 280 was designated by MnDOT as the official detour route for I-35W, resulting in its temporary conversion into a full freeway by closing the intersections at County Road B, Broadway Street, Walnut Street, and Roselawn Avenue. Despite the replacement I-35W bridge's opening on September 18, 2008, many of MN 280's at-grade intersections never reopened.

Plans for a permanent MN 280 reconfiguration were discussing at an open house meeting on October 21, 2008. Construction began in early 2009, along with the replacement for the Larpenteur Avenue/East Hennepin Avenue interchange along MN 280. The construction project was completed in December 2009.

== Exit list ==
The entire route is in Ramsey County.

Location	mi	km	Exit	Destinations	Notes
St. Paul	0.000	0.000	0A-B	I-94 / US 12 / US 52	I-94 exit 236
St. Paul	0.000– 0.794	0.000– 1.278	0C	CR 34 (University Avenue) / Territorial Road	
St. Paul	1.176– 1.231	1.893– 1.981	1A	CR 32 (Energy Park Drive) / Kasota Avenue	
St. Paul	1.771– 1.858	2.850– 2.990	1B	Como Avenue	
Lauderdale	2.193– 2.428	3.529– 3.907	2	CR 30 (Larpenteur Avenue) / CR 52 (Hennepin Avenue)	
Lauderdale	2.920	4.699	—	Broadway Street	Signalized at-grade intersection (to be removed in 2028 & to become a right-in, right-out southbound); no access from Broadway to northbound MN 280
Roseville			—	Terminal Road	
Roseville	3.648– 3.710	5.871– 5.971	—	I-35W north / MN 36 east	Northbound exit and southbound entrance; I-35W exit 22A
1.000 mi = 1.609 km; 1.000 km = 0.621 mi: Incomplete access
