= Downer, Minnesota =

Unincorporated community in Minnesota, United States

Downer
- Unincorporated community
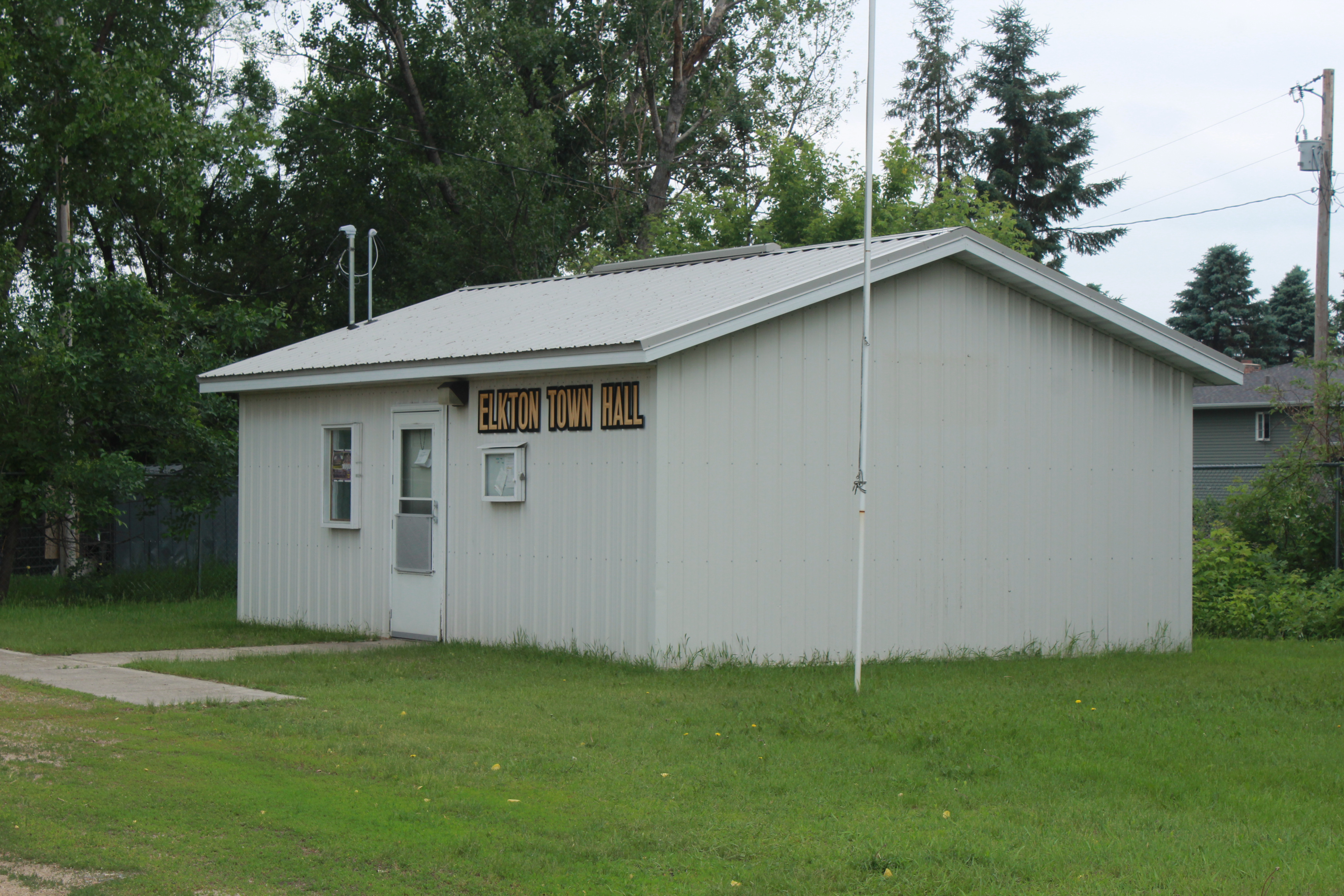
- Elkton Town Hall at the community of Downer

- Location within Minnesota Location within the United States
- Coordinates: 46°45′15″N 96°29′13″W
- Country: United States
- State: Minnesota
- County: Clay
- Township: Elkton Township
- Elevation: 968 ft (295 m)
- Time zone: UTC-6 (Central (CST))
  - Summer (DST): UTC-5 (CDT)
- ZIP code: 56514
- Area code: 218
- GNIS feature ID: 642918

Downer is an unincorporated community in Elkton Township, Clay County, Minnesota, United States.

The community is located between Moorhead and Barnesville at the junction of Minnesota State Highway 9 and County Road 10 (90th Avenue South). Interstate 94 is nearby.

== History ==
Downer contained a post office from 1886 until 1954. The community was named by the railroad.

== Gallery ==
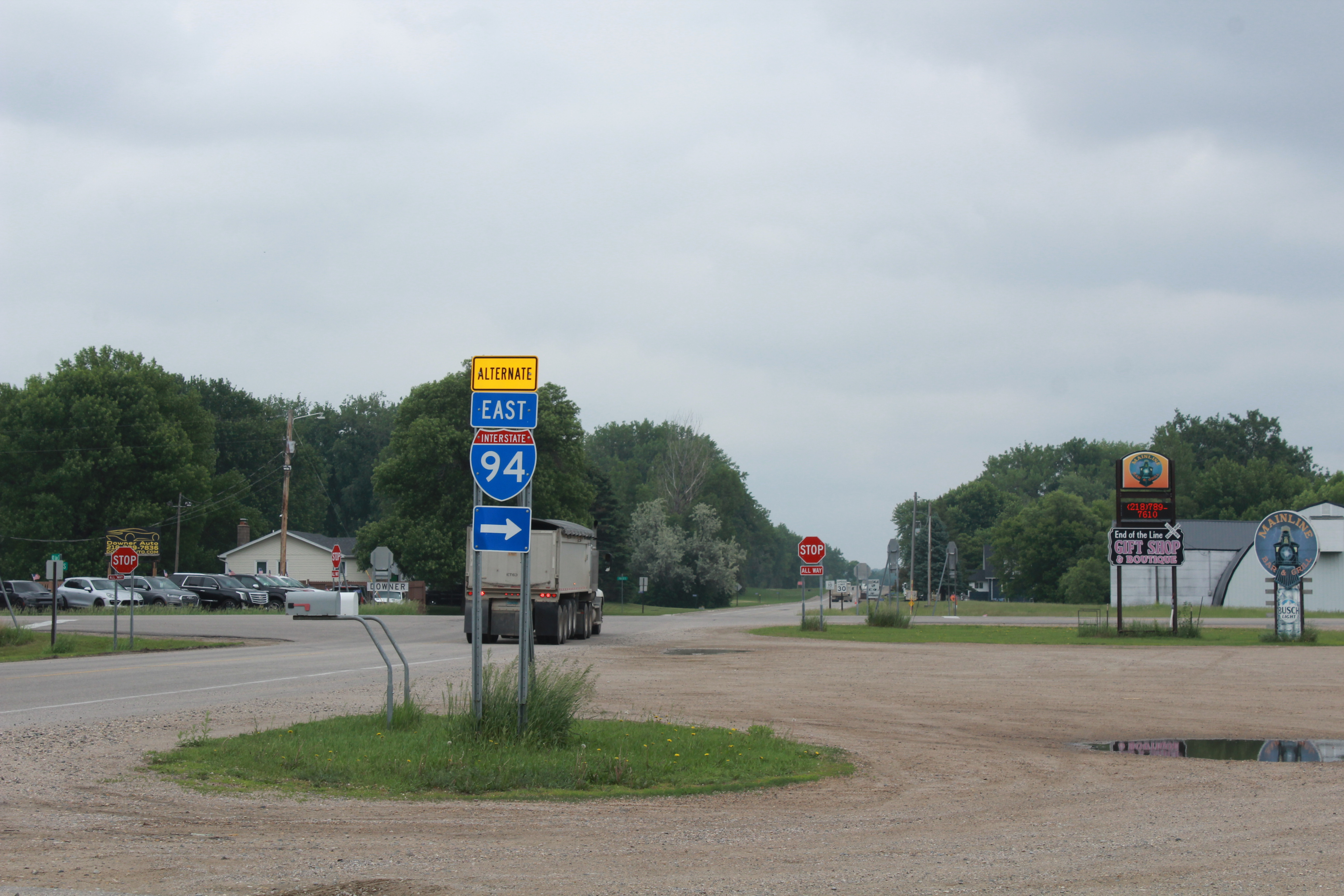
State Highway 9 crossing 90th Avenue / County Road 10

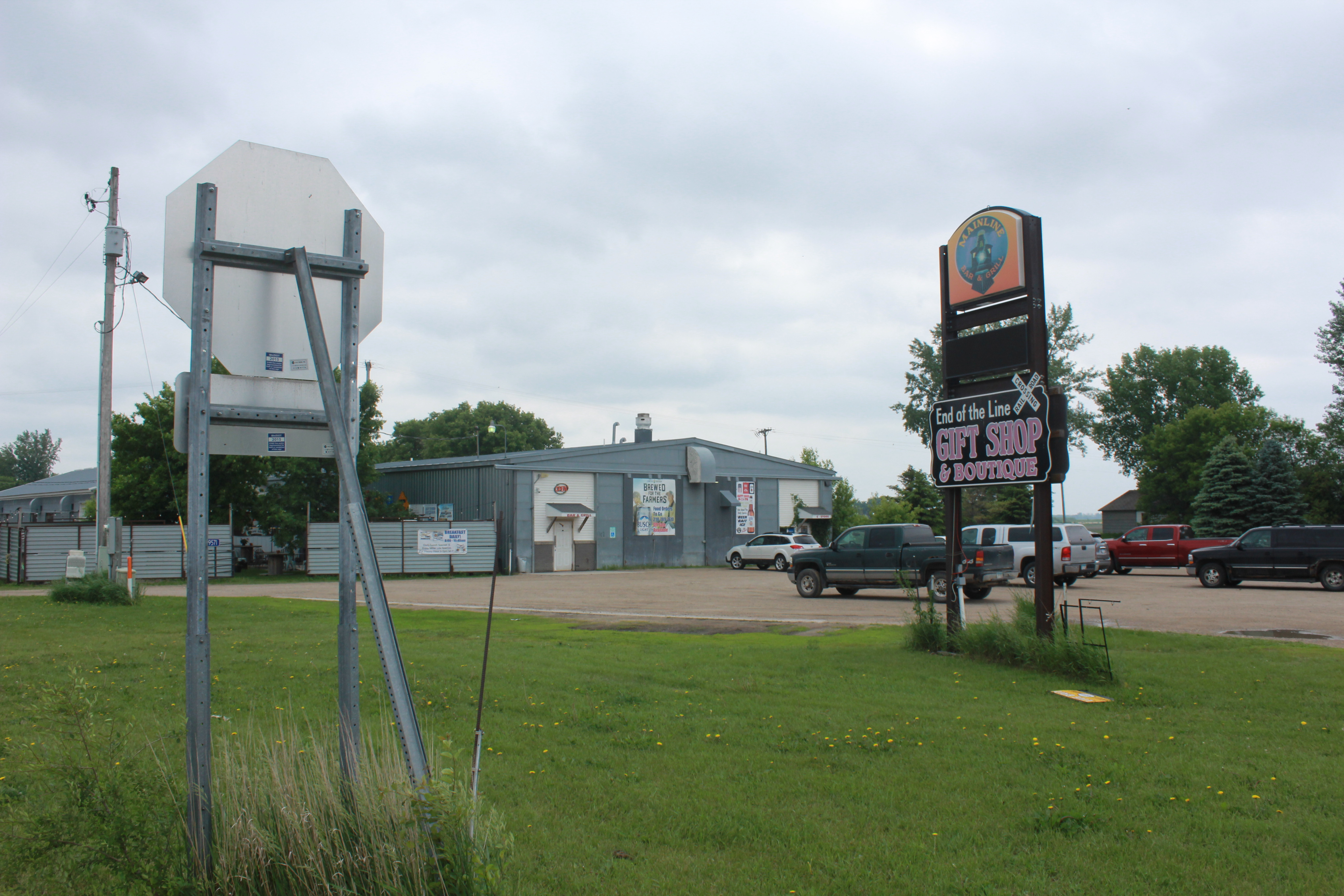
Mainline Bar and Grill

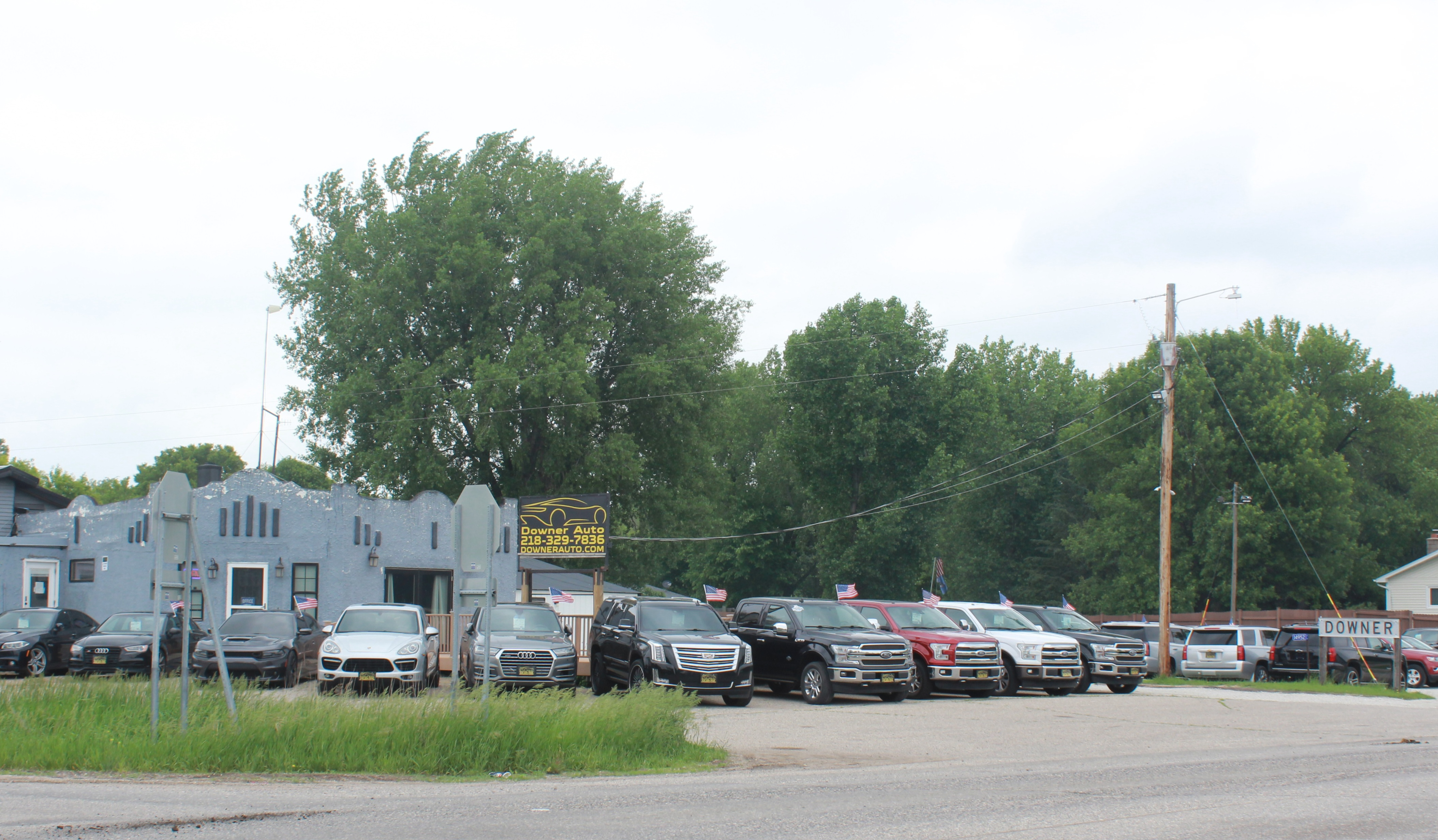
Downer Auto
