= Interstate 394 =

Highway in Minnesota

Interstate 394
- I-394 highlighted in red

Route information
- Auxiliary route of I-94
- Maintained by MnDOT
- Length: 9.75 mi (15.69 km)
- Existed: 1991–present
- NHS: Entire route

Major junctions
- West end: I-494 / US 12 in Minnetonka
- US 169 on the Minnetonka–Golden Valley line; MN 100 on the St. Louis Park–Golden Valley line; I-94 / US 52 / US 12 in Minneapolis
- East end: 3rd and 4th Streets in Minneapolis

Location
- Country: United States
- State: Minnesota
- Counties: Hennepin

Highway system
- Interstate Highway System; Main; Auxiliary; Suffixed; Business; Future; Minnesota Trunk Highway System; Interstate; US; State; Legislative; Scenic
← MN 371	→ I-494

Interstate 394 (I-394) is a short east–west auxiliary Interstate Highway in Hennepin County in the US state of Minnesota. It is also commonly referred to by its pre-1991 name, Wayzata Boulevard, and by its other designation for most of its route, US Highway 12 (US 12). It runs for 9.8 miles (15.8 km) from downtown Minneapolis to I-494 in the Minneapolis suburb of Minnetonka. At its western terminus, the roadway loses its Interstate designation but continues as US 12. I-394 serves as the most direct link for commuters and other drivers who are traveling between downtown Minneapolis and parts of the western Minneapolis–Saint Paul metropolitan area.

I-394 maintains at least three lanes in each direction except under the Minnesota State Highway 100 (MN 100) interchange and also between I-94/US 52 and its eastern terminus downtown.

== Route description ==
I-394 begins on the western side of the Twin Cities in the suburb of Minnetonka, at its interchange with I-494 (exit 19). From there, I-394 takes a 9.5-mile (15.3 km) course toward downtown Minneapolis where the eastern terminus is at 4th Street North.

Legally, the route of I-394 is defined as unmarked legislative routes 10 and 107 in Minnesota Statutes §§ 161.114(2) and 161.115(38). I-394 is not marked with these legislative numbers along the actual highway.

=== E-ZPass Minnesota toll lanes ===
There are two high-occupancy toll (HOT) express lanes at the center of the road. Prior to May 16, 2005, they had been traditional high-occupancy vehicle (HOV, or carpool) lanes, allowing buses, motorcycles, and vehicles with two or more occupants to use them during rush-hour periods, while single-occupancy vehicles were not permitted. Now, drivers riding alone can use the lanes at any time but must have an E-ZPass Minnesota electronic toll collection transponder in order to pay for using the express portions.

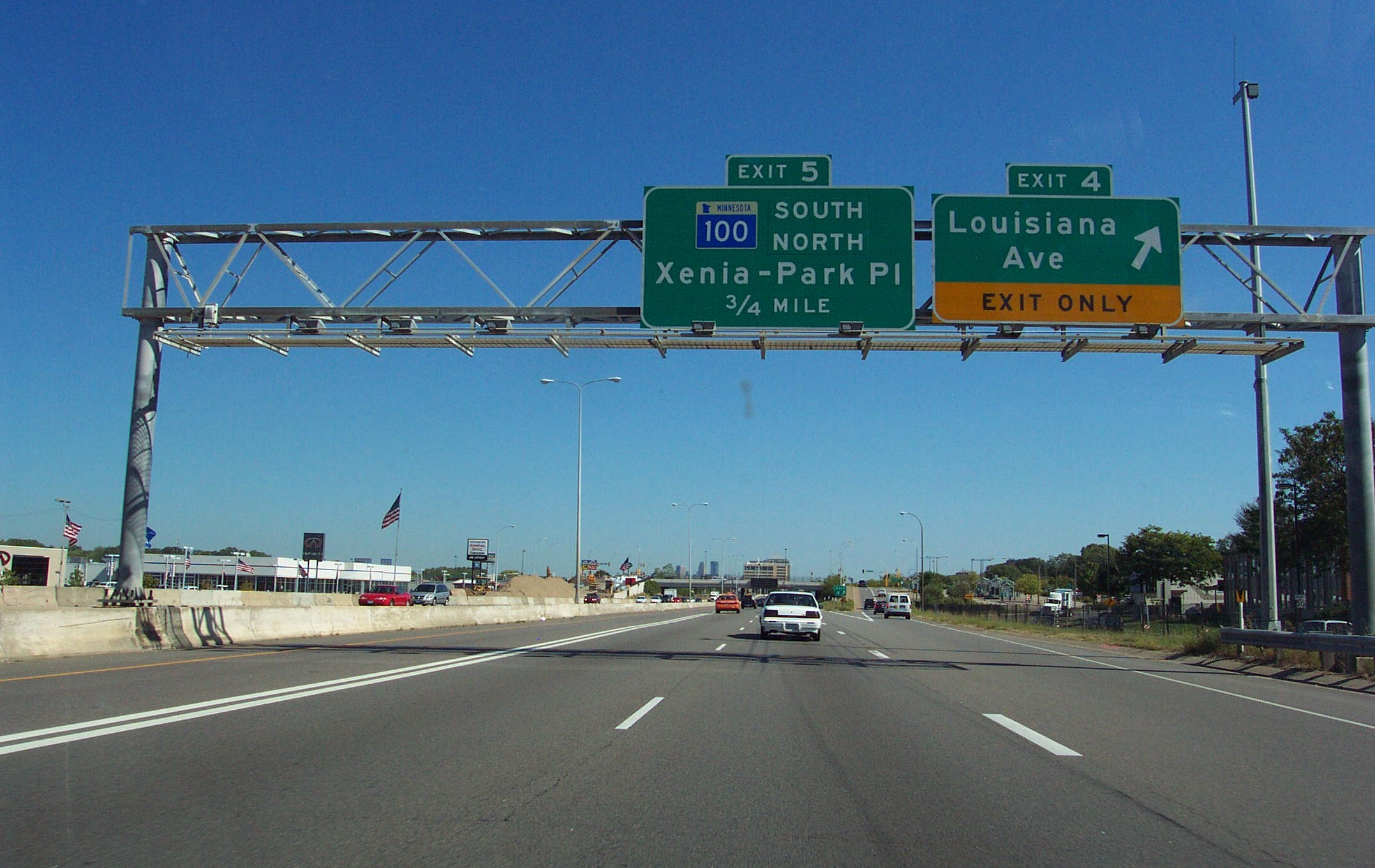
I-394 heading eastbound toward downtown Minneapolis. Notice the E-ZPass Minnesota toll lane to the left.

From I-494 to MN 100, the lanes of I-394 are separated from traffic by double white lines. Between MN 100 and I-94/US 52 near downtown, the two lanes are combined into a reversible expressway in the median that is separated from the eastbound and westbound lanes by concrete barriers. This segment changes directions to accommodate the traffic flow at different times of day, so, in the morning, it is open to downtown-bound eastward flowing traffic, while it is open to westbound traffic in the evening.

An E-ZPass Minnesota electronic transponder is required in order to pay tolls because there are no tollbooths on the roadway. The price varies depending on the time of day and flow of traffic. Lone drivers were previously allowed to use the express lanes in off-peak times, but this is no longer allowed under the new system unless the sign says the cost is "OPEN", meaning free. The decision to make the nonreversible lanes free on off-hours was reached due to complaints about essentially making a four-lane freeway in an area that, even on off-hours, sorely needed six. Toll rates are expected to generally fall between $1.00 and $4.00, with a potential maximum of $8.00. Off-hours are charged as $0.25 on the reversible lanes and free on the one-way lanes. The white line-separated and reversible expressway sections are priced separately. The lanes are still open free to busses, motorcycles, and cars with two or more people, no matter the time of day, and such vehicles do not require transponders to use the lanes.

Using the express lanes as a lone driver without a transponder during charged periods or crossing the double white lines will result in a large fine placed upon the driver. To enter and exit properly, vehicles must use an entry point without double white lines. The line rule is true even when the lane is free of charge.

Transponders began to be sold a few weeks before the May 16, 2005, opening date. By June 2005, about 6,500 drivers had signed up for the system.

== History ==
The highway, a four lane divided highway, used to be designated as Wayzata Boulevard and US 12. The construction of I-394 was authorized in 1968. Funding became available after the canceled I-335 freeway project in 1978. I-335 had been planned to be a northern loop around downtown Minneapolis that would have passed through northeast Minneapolis. The money was substituted to the I-394 project. Wayzata Boulevard/US 12, starting in 1982, was to be redesigned as I-394. Construction of I-394 occurred mainly in the 1980s, starting at the western terminus in Minnetonka and opening in sections toward downtown Minneapolis throughout the late 1980s. The entire route of I-394 was officially opened in 1991.

A former lane drop of I-394 at the Penn Avenue exit was eliminated in 2000.

== Exit list ==
The entire route is in Hennepin County.

Location	mi	km	Exit	Destinations	Notes
Minnetonka	0.000	0.000		US 12 west – Wayzata	Continuation beyond western terminus; HOV/toll lanes continue westward on US 12 as well
Minnetonka	0.000	0.000	1	I-494 / Carlson Parkway / Linner Road	Western terminus; western end of US 12 overlap; signed as exits 1A (south) and 1B (north); I-494 exit 19A-B; eastbound exit to I-494 Northbound is part of Exit 1A
Minnetonka	0.748	1.204	1C	CSAH 61 (Plymouth Road)	
Minnetonka	1.338	2.153	1D	Ridgedale Drive	
Minnetonka	1.941	3.124	2	CSAH 73 (Hopkins Crossroad)	
St. Louis Park–Golden Valley line	2.946	4.741	3	US 169 / General Mills Boulevard	
Golden Valley–St. Louis Park line	4.455	7.170	4	Louisiana Avenue	
Golden Valley–St. Louis Park line	5.925	9.535	5A	Xenia Avenue / Park Place	
Golden Valley–St. Louis Park line	5.925	9.535	♦	I-394 Express east (HOV/toll lanes)	Dedicated eastbound and westbound HOV/toll lanes, each adjacent to the regular lanes, merge into one reversible HOV/toll lanes ramp
Golden Valley	5.925	9.535	5B	MN 100	
Golden Valley	5.925	9.535	♦	MN 100 south / South Frontage Road	Westbound exit and eastbound entrance for HOV/toll lanes
Golden Valley	5.925	9.535	♦	MN 100 north	Westbound exit and eastbound entrance for HOV/toll lanes
Minneapolis	7.749	12.471	7	CSAH 2 (Penn Avenue)	
Minneapolis	8.387	13.498	8A	Van White Memorial Boulevard / Dunwoody Boulevard – Prohibited vehicles	Eastbound exit and westbound entrance for regular and HOV/toll lanes
Minneapolis			♦	I-94 / US 12 east (US 52 south)	Eastbound exit and westbound entrance for HOV/toll lanes
Minneapolis	8.667	13.948	8B	US 12 east / I-94 (US 52)	Eastern end of US 12 overlap; eastbound exit and westbound entrance; I-94 exit 231A
Minneapolis			♦	I-394 Express west (HOV/toll lanes)	Eastern end of reversible HOV/toll lanes
Minneapolis	8.963	14.425	9A	12th Street North	Eastbound exit and westbound entrance
Minneapolis	9.186	14.783	9B	6th Street North / Ramp A / Ramp B	Eastbound exit and westbound entrance; ramps lead to downtown parking garages
Minneapolis	9.418– 9.735	15.157– 15.667	9C	3rd Avenue North / Washington Avenue	Eastbound exit and westbound entrance
Minneapolis	9.418– 9.735	15.157– 15.667		4th Street North / 3rd Street North	Eastern terminus
1.000 mi = 1.609 km; 1.000 km = 0.621 mi: Concurrency terminus; HOV only; Incomplete access
