= Minnesota Road Research Facility =

Research lab operated by the Minnesota Department of Transportation

Coordinates: 45.26208°N 93.709774°W

The Minnesota Road Research Facility (also known as MnROAD, pronounced Min-road), is an outdoor research laboratory operated by the Minnesota Department of Transportation (MnDOT) that specializes in testing different types of pavement. It is located 40 miles (64 km) northwest of Minneapolis-St. Paul near the town of Albertville along Interstate 94 (I-94), and in 1996, the Federal Highway Administration said it was the largest outdoor pavement research facility in the world. Minnesota is a good site for such a project, as the state experiences some of the largest seasonal swings in temperature in the United States, and has a spring freeze–thaw cycle that can heavily damage roadways. More than 4,500 sensors are embedded in and under the road surfaces to measure stresses while the test segments are in use. The facility was constructed from 1990 through 1993 at a cost of $25 million and opened in 1994. It earned an Award of Merit in the Federal Highway Administration's 1996 Excellence in Highway Design competition.

A three-mile (4.8 km) stretch of the Interstate is redirected onto test pavement at the site, and a test track simulating a low-volume rural roadway loops through the facility. Real highway traffic is used for this mainline test area, but traffic is simulated on the low-volume road by a semi-trailer truck. A bypass is available to shift traffic off the mainline testing area so researchers can closely examine the pavement without disrupting flow on the highway.

Many different organizations have partnered with Mn/DOT to conduct research at the facility, ranging from partners such as the University of Minnesota, Federal Highway Administration, and Wisconsin Department of Transportation to others like the National Road Administration of Finland.

== See also ==
- AASHO Road Test
