= Lowry Hill Tunnel =

Tunnel in Minneapolis, Minnesota

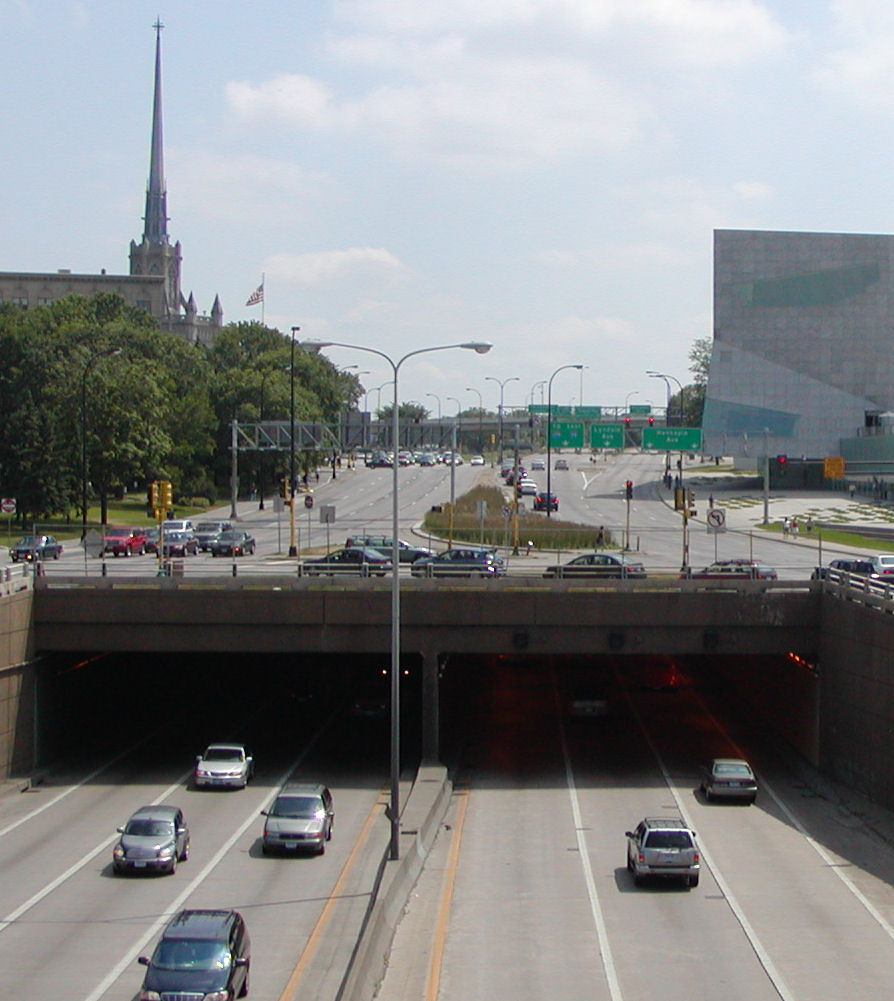
- The entrance of Lowry Hill Tunnel from the north/west, below Hennepin and Lyndale Avenues
- Interactive map of Lowry Hill Tunnel

Overview
- Location: Minneapolis, Minnesota
- Coordinates: 44.96583°N 93.288217°W
- Status: Open
- Route: I-94
- Crosses: Local streets over Interstate 94

Operation
- Opened: 1971
- Owner: Minnesota Department of Transportation (MnDOT)
- Traffic: Automotive
- Vehicles per day: 175,000 (2018)

Technical
- Length: 1,496 ft (455 m)
- No. of lanes: 6
- Operating speed: 35 miles per hour (56 km/h)

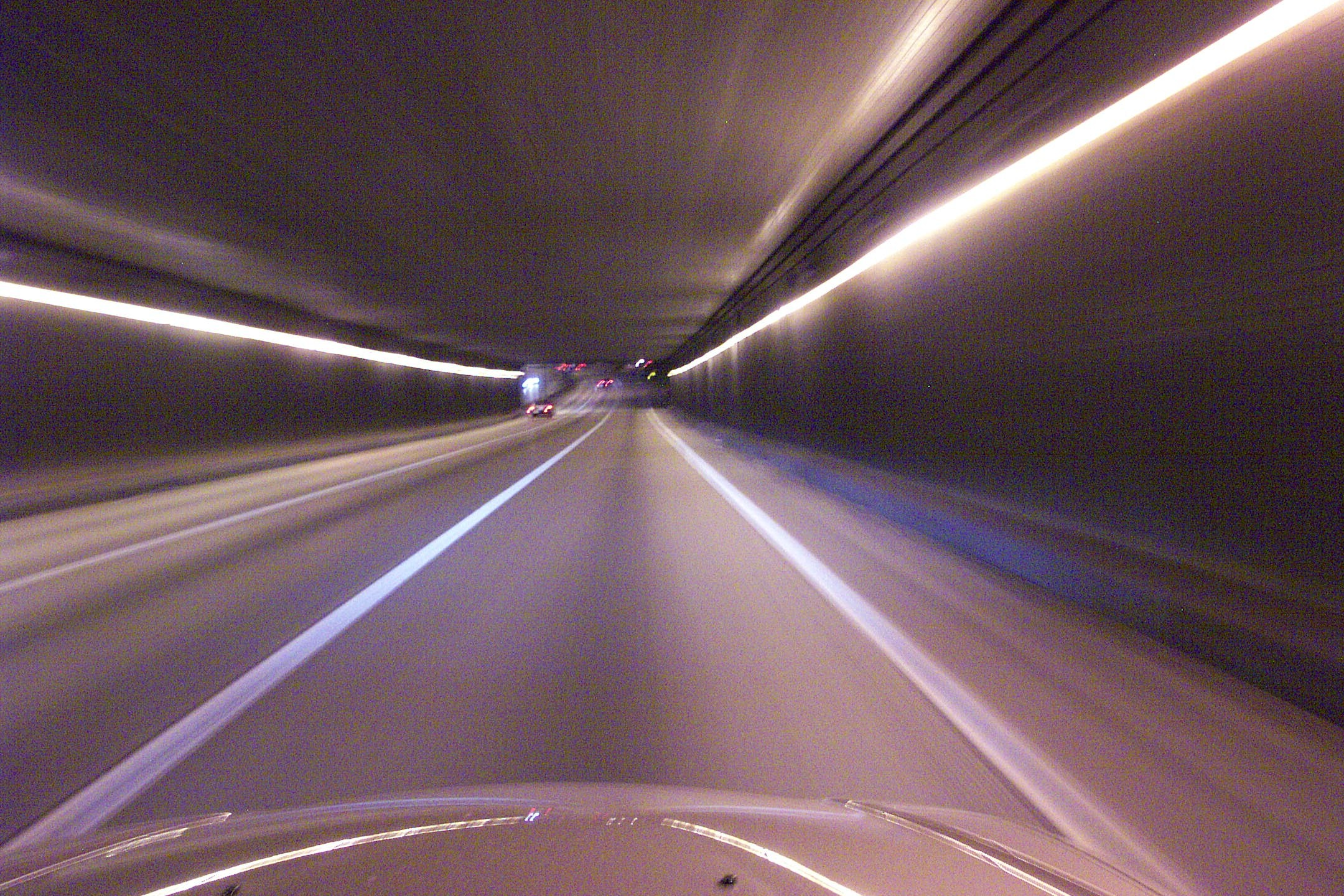
Inside the Lowry Hill Tunnel (Heading North inbound south) at night

The Lowry Hill Tunnel is a tunnel 1,496 feet (456 m) in length accommodating the Interstate 94 (I-94) freeway near downtown Minneapolis, Minnesota that was completed in late 1971. It is placed at a near-right-angle turn in the highway, forcing the three lanes of traffic in each direction to slow down. The advised speed is 40 miles per hour (64 km/h).

Although constructed as a tunnel through rock, the surface a few yards above is covered with roadways. The tunnel functions as if it were the underpass under a 0.25-mile-wide (400 m) bridge which carries Hennepin Avenue, Lyndale Avenue, and various ramps over I-94.

Opened in November 1971, this tunnel was built with $31 million to help fix the congestion of 30,000 vehicles a day. Today, the Lowry Hill Tunnel sees an average of 175,000 vehicles pass through it each day, 54% more than the Lincoln Tunnel that connects New Jersey to Manhattan. The tunnel originally opened with two lanes in each direction, but the shoulders have since been replaced with third lanes due to demand. Despite massive increases in traffic, especially since the construction of I-394 in the 1990s and population growth of over 1 million people in the metropolitan area, the tunnel cannot be widened as it sits between the footings and basements of St. Mark's Episcopal Cathedral (Minneapolis) and Hennepin Avenue United Methodist Church to the east and the Walker Art Center to the west.

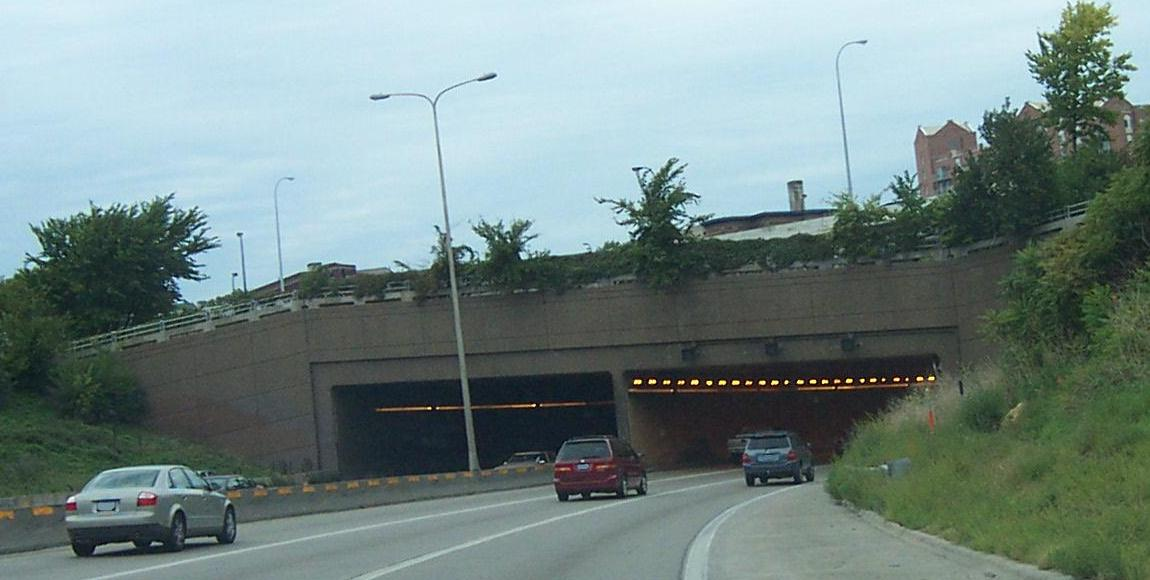
The entrance from the south/east
