= Buse Township, Otter Tail County, Minnesota =

Buse Township, Minnesota
- Township
- Location of Buse Township, within Otter Tail County, Minnesota

- Location within the state of Minnesota Buse Township, Minnesota (the United States)
- Coordinates: 46°15′29″N 96°3′46″W
- Country: United States
- State: Minnesota
- County: Otter Tail

Area
  - Total: 30.5 sq mi (79.1 km^{2})
  - Land: 28.1 sq mi (72.9 km^{2})
  - Water: 2.4 sq mi (6.2 km^{2})
- Elevation: 1,155 ft (352 m)

Population (2020)
  - Total: 474
  - Density: 16.8/sq mi (6.50/km^{2})
- Time zone: UTC-6 (Central (CST))
  - Summer (DST): UTC-5 (CDT)
- ZIP code: 56537
- Area code: 218
- FIPS code: 27-08938
- GNIS feature ID: 0663713
- Website: https://busetwp.com/

Buse Township is a township in Otter Tail County, Minnesota, United States. The population was 474 at the 2020 census.

Buse Township was organized in 1870, and named for Ernest Buse, a pioneer settler.

== Geography ==
According to the United States Census Bureau, the township has a total area of 30.5 square miles (79 km^{2}), of which 28.1 square miles (73 km^{2}) is land and 2.4 square miles (6.2 km^{2}) (7.83%) is water.

== Demographics ==
As of the census of 2000, there were 690 people, 247 households, and 192 families living in the township. The population density was 24.5 inhabitants per square mile (9.5/km^{2}). There were 283 housing units at an average density of 10.1 per square mile (3.9/km^{2}). The racial makeup of the township was 98.84% White, 0.14% African American, 0.58% Native American, 0.14% Asian, and 0.29% from two or more races. Hispanic or Latino of any race were 0.43% of the population.

There were 247 households, out of which 42.1% had children under the age of 18 living with them, 64.0% were married couples living together, 9.3% had a female householder with no husband present, and 21.9% were non-families. 17.0% of all households were made up of individuals, and 7.7% had someone living alone who was 65 years of age or older. The average household size was 2.79 and the average family size was 3.10.

In the township the population was spread out, with 30.4% under the age of 18, 9.3% from 18 to 24, 25.8% from 25 to 44, 22.3% from 45 to 64, and 12.2% who were 65 years of age or older. The median age was 34 years. For every 100 females, there were 91.7 males. For every 100 females age 18 and over, there were 96.7 males.

The median income for a household in the township was $41,964, and the median income for a family was $44,583. Males had a median income of $30,982 versus $24,286 for females. The per capita income for the township was $18,207. About 4.0% of families and 6.9% of the population were below the poverty line, including 9.7% of those under age 18 and 8.3% of those age 65 or over.
