= Lauderdale, Minnesota =

City in Minnesota, United States

- City
- Logo

- Location of the city of Lauderdale within Ramsey County, Minnesota
- Coordinates: 44°59′40″N 93°12′10″W
- Country: United States
- State: Minnesota
- County: Ramsey
- Incorporated: January 21st, 1949
- Named after: William Henry Lauderdale

Government
  - City Administrator: Heather Butkowski

Area
  - Total: 0.42 sq mi (1.09 km^{2})
  - Land: 0.42 sq mi (1.09 km^{2})
  - Water: 0 sq mi (0.00 km^{2})
- Elevation: 971 ft (296 m)

Population (2020)
  - Total: 2,271
  - Density: 5,418.2/sq mi (2,091.98/km^{2})
- Time zone: UTC-6 (Central (CST))
  - Summer (DST): UTC-5 (CDT)
- ZIP codes: 55108, 55113
- Area code: 651
- FIPS code: 27-35738
- GNIS feature ID: 2395642
- Website: www.lauderdalemn.org/

Lauderdale is a city in Ramsey County, Minnesota, United States. The population was 2,271 at the 2020 census. Lauderdale is part of the Minneapolis–St. Paul metropolitan area and is bordered by Minneapolis, St. Paul, Roseville, and Falcon Heights. Along with Roseville, it is one of two cities to be bordered directly by Minneapolis and St. Paul.

== History ==
Originally named Rose Hill, Lauderdale was part of the larger Rose Township, named after trader Isaac Rose. Rose Township included parts of what are now Roseville, Falcon Heights, Minneapolis, Saint Paul, Saint Anthony Village and Lauderdale. In 1871, Rose Hill's first school opened when Heman Gibbs of Gibbs Farm Museum fame donated the land for the school.

The Village of Lauderdale was incorporated on January 21, 1949. It was named after William Henry Lauderdale, a prominent Twin Cities businessman who donated land to Rose Hill Township for a school and park.

== Education ==
Lauderdale is served by the Roseville Area School District (ISD 623). Part of the Luther Seminary campus is within Lauderdale's city limits.

== Geography ==
According to the United States Census Bureau, the city has a total area of 0.42 square miles (1.09 km^{2}), all land.

Minnesota Highway 280 serves as a main route in the community.

== Demographics ==
Historical population
Census	Pop.	Note	%±
1950	1,033		—
1960	1,676		62.2%
1970	2,530		51.0%
1980	1,985		−21.5%
1990	2,700		36.0%
2000	2,364		−12.4%
2010	2,379		0.6%
2020	2,271		−4.5%
U.S. Decennial Census

=== Racial and ethnic composition ===
Lauderdale, Minnesota - Demographic Profile (NH = Non-Hispanic)
Race / Ethnicity	Pop 2000	Pop 2010	Pop 2020	% 2000	% 2010	% 2020
White alone (NH)	1,819	1,646	1,554	76.95%	69.19%	68.43%
Black or African American alone (NH)	116	125	222	4.91%	5.25%	9.78%
Native American or Alaska Native alone (NH)	11	6	7	0.47%	0.25%	0.31%
Asian alone (NH)	305	457	262	12.90%	19.21%	11.54%
Pacific Islander alone (NH)	0	1	0	0.00%	0.04%	0.00%
Some Other Race alone (NH)	0	2	7	0.00%	0.08%	0.31%
Mixed Race/Multi-Racial (NH)	52	62	97	2.20%	2.61%	4.27%
Hispanic or Latino (any race)	61	80	122	2.58%	3.36%	5.37%
Total	2,364	2,379	2,271	100.00%	100.00%	100.00%

Note: the US Census treats Hispanic/Latino as an ethnic category. This table excludes Latinos from the racial categories and assigns them to a separate category. Hispanics/Latinos can be of any race.

=== 2020 census ===
As of the 2020 census, Lauderdale had a population of 2,271. The median age was 33.4 years. 12.9% of residents were under the age of 18 and 14.5% were 65 years of age or older. For every 100 females there were 103.9 males, and for every 100 females age 18 and over there were 104.7 males age 18 and over.

100.0% of residents lived in urban areas, while 0.0% lived in rural areas.

There were 1,170 households, of which 16.4% had children under the age of 18 living in them. Of all households, 29.7% were married-couple households, 30.6% were households with a male householder and no spouse or partner present, and 30.1% were households with a female householder and no spouse or partner present. About 40.7% of all households were made up of individuals, and 8.8% had someone living alone who was 65 years of age or older.

There were 1,215 housing units, of which 3.7% were vacant. The homeowner vacancy rate was 1.3% and the rental vacancy rate was 2.1%.

=== 2010 census ===
As of the census of 2010, there were 2,379 people, 1,130 households, and 530 families residing in the city. The population density was 5,664.3 inhabitants per square mile (2,187.0/km^{2}). There were 1,202 housing units at an average density of 2,861.9 per square mile (1,105.0/km^{2}). The racial makeup of the city was 71.1% White, 5.3% African American, 0.3% Native American, 19.3% Asian, 1.0% from other races, and 2.9% from two or more races. Hispanic or Latino of any race were 3.4% of the population.

There were 1,130 households, of which 21.2% had children under the age of 18 living with them, 37.6% were married couples living together, 6.0% had a female householder with no husband present, 3.3% had a male householder with no wife present, and 53.1% were non-families. 38.7% of all households were made up of individuals, and 7.1% had someone living alone who was 65 years of age or older. The average household size was 2.10 and the average family size was 2.90.

The median age in the city was 31.5 years. 17.7% of residents were under the age of 18; 13.1% were between the ages of 18 and 24; 39% were from 25 to 44; 20% were from 45 to 64; and 10% were 65 years of age or older. The gender makeup of the city was 49.4% male and 50.6% female.

=== 2000 census ===
As of the census of 2000, there were 2,364 people, 1,150 households, and 550 families residing in the city. The population density was 5,597.2 inhabitants per square mile (2,161.1/km^{2}). There were 1,169 housing units at an average density of 2,767.8 per square mile (1,068.7/km^{2}). The racial makeup of the city was 78.55% White, 4.91% African American, 0.47% Native American, 12.90% Asian, 0.38% from other races, and 2.79% from two or more races. Hispanic or Latino of any race were 2.58% of the population.

There were 1,150 households, out of which 19.4% had children under the age of 18 living with them, 37.2% were married couples living together, 7.7% had a female householder with no husband present, and 52.1% were non-families. 39.6% of all households were made up of individuals, and 4.6% had someone living alone who was 65 years of age or older. The average household size was 2.06 and the average family size was 2.81.

In the city, the population was spread out, with 16.9% under the age of 18, 16.3% from 18 to 24, 38.7% from 25 to 44, 19.5% from 45 to 64, and 8.7% who were 65 years of age or older. The median age was 32 years. For every 100 females, there were 93.6 males. For every 100 females age 18 and over, there were 94.2 males.

The median income for a household in the city was $39,063, and the median income for a family was $52,813. Males had a median income of $33,542 versus $31,059 for females. The per capita income for the city was $23,293. About 3.4% of families and 9.3% of the population were below the poverty line, including 2.8% of those under age 18 and none of those age 65 or over.

== Politics ==
Lauderdale is in Minnesota's 4th congressional district, represented by Democrat Betty McCollum. In the Minnesota Legislature, it is a part of Minnesota Senate, District 66, represented by Clare Oumou Verbeten and Minnesota House of Representatives District 66A, represented by Leigh Finke. Both are members of the Minnesota Democratic–Farmer–Labor Party.

Presidential election results 1996–2024

United States presidential election results for Lauderdale, Minnesota
Year	Republican		Democratic		Third party(ies)	
Year	No.	%	No.	%	No.	%
1996	332	27.39%	739	60.97%	141	11.63%
2000	429	31.71%	805	59.50%	119	8.80%
2004	394	27.75%	995	70.07%	31	2.18%
2008	368	26.46%	999	71.82%	24	1.73%
2012	326	25.04%	935	71.81%	41	3.15%
2016	245	19.19%	919	71.97%	113	8.85%
2020	277	20.03%	1072	77.51%	34	2.46%
2024	254	18.30%	1086	78.24%	48	3.46%
