= Moyer Township, Swift County, Minnesota =

Moyer Township, Minnesota
- Township
- Location within the state of Minnesota Moyer Township, Minnesota (the United States)
- Coordinates: 45°17′24″N 95°55′21″W
- Country: United States
- State: Minnesota
- County: Swift

Area
  - Total: 34.8 sq mi (90.1 km^{2})
  - Land: 34.8 sq mi (90.1 km^{2})
  - Water: 0 sq mi (0.0 km^{2})
- Elevation: 1,060 ft (323 m)

Population (2000)
  - Total: 125
  - Density: 3.6/sq mi (1.4/km^{2})
- Time zone: UTC-6 (Central (CST))
  - Summer (DST): UTC-5 (CDT)
- FIPS code: 27-44674
- GNIS feature ID: 0665059

Moyer Township is a township in Swift County, Minnesota, United States. The population was 125 at the 2000 census.

Moyer Township was organized in 1879, and named for William Moyer, a pioneer settler.

== Geography ==
According to the United States Census Bureau, the township has a total area of 34.8 square miles (90.1 km^{2}), of which 34.8 square miles (90.1 km^{2}) is land and 0.03% is water.

== Demographics ==
As of the census of 2000, there were 125 people, 46 households, and 37 families residing in the township. The population density was 3.6 people per square mile (1.4/km^{2}). There were 53 housing units at an average density of 1.5/sq mi (0.6/km^{2}). The racial makeup of the township was 94.40% White, 4.00% Asian, 0.80% from other races, and 0.80% from two or more races. Hispanic or Latino of any race were 0.80% of the population.

There were 46 households, out of which 32.6% had children under the age of 18 living with them, 71.7% were married couples living together, 8.7% had a female householder with no husband present, and 17.4% were non-families. 17.4% of all households were made up of individuals, and 4.3% had someone living alone who was 65 years of age or older. The average household size was 2.72 and the average family size was 3.05.

In the township the population was spread out, with 27.2% under the age of 18, 3.2% from 18 to 24, 28.8% from 25 to 44, 23.2% from 45 to 64, and 17.6% who were 65 years of age or older. The median age was 40 years. For every 100 females, there were 108.3 males. For every 100 females age 18 and over, there were 116.7 males.

The median income for a household in the township was $41,250, and the median income for a family was $43,125. Males had a median income of $25,625 versus $20,833 for females. The per capita income for the township was $16,497. There were 11.4% of families and 7.3% of the population living below the poverty line, including no under eighteens and 16.0% of those over 64.
