= Christina Lake (Minnesota) =

Lake in the state of Minnesota, United States

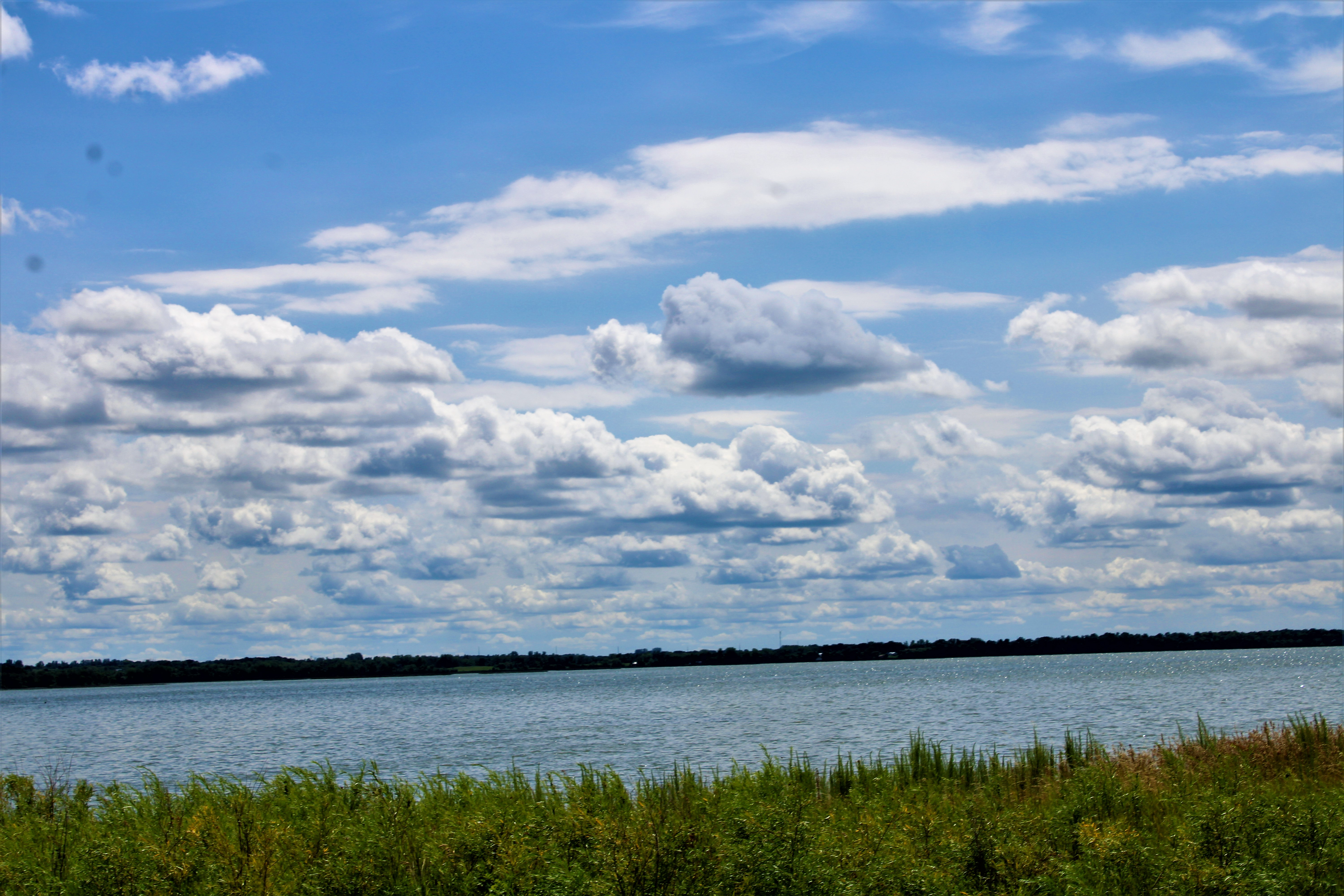
- Christina Lake in 2022

- Location within Minnesota
- Location: Douglas / Grant counties, Minnesota, United States
- Coordinates: 46°05′33″N 95°44′39″W
- Basin countries: United States
- Surface area: 3,978 acres (1,610 ha)
- Average depth: 4 ft (1.2 m)
- Max. depth: 14 ft (4.3 m)
- Surface elevation: 1,214 ft (370 m)
- Settlements: Ashby, Melby

Christina Lake is a lake situated in west-central Minnesota. It is primarily situated in Douglas County, with its western part extending into Grant County. The lake measures 3,978 acres (16.10 km^{2}), with an average depth of 4 ft (1.2 m). The lake is a designated Wildlife Management Lake and is nationally recognized for providing a staging area for migrating waterfowl, particularly the canvasback. Literally tens-of-thousands of waterfowl can be seen clustered in huge rafts across the expanse of the lake during peak migration, making the spot a primary destination for birders and waterfowlers.

The one public access is located on the southwest corner of the lake, off of State Highway 82. It is owned and maintained by the Minnesota Department of Natural Resources.

== History ==
According to Warren Upham, Christina Lake was probably named for a pioneer woman of Swedish descent.

In the 1930s and 1940s Christina Lake was considered one of the finest canvasback lakes in the world, even being considered equal to Chesapeake Bay for the number of birds present. Being a large shallow lake thick with sago pondweed created a virtual duck magnet. At this time wildlife biologists counted an average of 50,000 canvasbacks on the lake per day. The lake claimed nearly 20 percent of the continent's canvasbacks.

By 1959 highest single-day counts reached 250 at best. Then during peak migration in 1984, only 15.

The problem was that the lake became too murky to support the pondweed, which in turn left the ducks with little to eat. Rough fish were believed to be the problem, and in 1987 the DNR poisoned the lake and installed electric fish barrier in the channel connecting lake Christina to nearby Pelican.

Duck numbers rebounded to 68,000 in 1993. However as time passed fish populations once again rebounded, leading to an application of rotenone across the lake via helicopter in 2003. By 2005 the water clarity had once again dramatically improved, once again bringing about a resurgence of waterfowl. In 2012 the Minnesota DNR also installed a water pump to pump water from the lake into connecting Lake Pelican to reduce water and have a freeze out now the water and sago pondweed are the best they been in past decade.

The Minnesota DNR continues to monitor the lake with management efforts directed at keeping fish populations down.

== Fishery ==
Currently, the lake is closed to fishing. The fishery struggles to produce large gamefish. For instance, in a survey conducted by the MnDNR in 2005, the normal range of northern pike was only 2-6 lb. One reason that can be attributed to this is the fact that the lake has experienced several fish kills in the last several decades. The application of rotenone on the lake has largely depleted the populations of larger/older fish. Although the lake is closed to fishing and has experienced several fish kills, several species can still be found there.

These include:

- Bigmouth buffalo
- Black bullhead
- Black crappie
- Bluegill
- Brown bullhead
- Common carp
- Northern pike
- Pumpkinseed sunfish
- Yellow perch
