= Regions Hospital =

Coordinates: 44°57′19″N 93°5′40″W

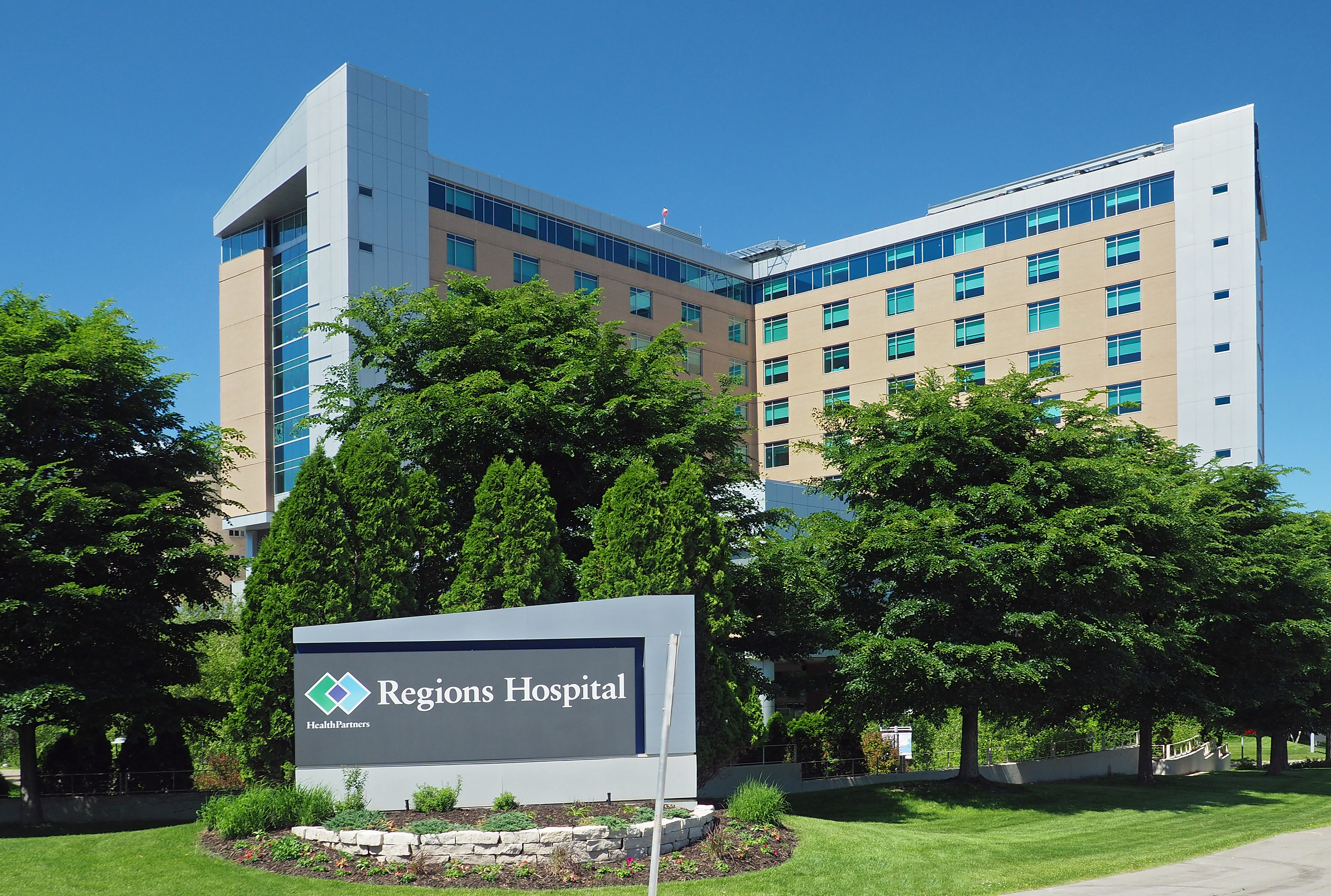

Geography
- Location: 640 Jackson Street; St. Paul, Minnesota, United States

Organization
- Care system: HealthPartners
- Funding: Non-profit hospital
- Type: Teaching and Tertiary Care
- Affiliated university: University of Minnesota

Services
- Emergency department: Level I adult and pediatric trauma center
- Beds: 550+ (all private)

History
- Opened: 1872

Links
- Website: regionshospital.com
- Lists: Hospitals in Minnesota

Regions Hospital is a teaching hospital located in Saint Paul, Minnesota, United States. It has been a part of HealthPartners since 1993. The hospital is an ACS verified Level I Trauma Center for both children and adults, and was Minnesota's first pediatric level one trauma center. Regions Hospital is a leading full-service private nonprofit hospital, with special programs in heart, cancer, behavioral health, burn, orthopedics, emergency and trauma care.

== History ==
The hospital was established in 1872 by the Ramsey County Board of Commissioners as City and County Hospital. It later became Ancker Hospital in 1923, named after its superintendent Dr. Arthur Ancker. In 1965, it moved to its current location on Jackson St. and University Avenue and became St. Paul-Ramsey Hospital. In 1977 the hospital's name became St. Paul-Ramsey Medical Center when the north section of the building is added to the Ramsey campus. In 1997, it was renamed Regions Hospital. In early 2019 Regions Hospital started construction on a new 55 bed birth center, which opened in mid August 2020. The new birth center features water birthing suites, expanded Level II NICU care in partnership with its partner facility Gilette Children's, and Minnesota's first enhanced couplet care rooms. Regions Hospital has 550+ beds.

== Leadership ==
Megan Remark has been the president and chief executive officer since 2015.

== Awards ==
In 2013, the cancer center received the "Three-Year with Commendation" and 2013 Outstanding Achievement awards from the American College of Surgeons. In 2007 and 2008, the hospital was a Solucient Top 100 Hospital: Cardiovascular Benchmarks in the teaching Hospital Category. HealthGrades has given the hospital specialty excellence awards for Stroke Care, Critical Care, and Coronary Interventions. The Leapfrog Group has identified the hospital as one of the nations Highest Value hospitals for heart attacks, heart failure, and pneumonia patients while using resources wisely.

Regions Hospital has also been named to U.S. News & World Report's Listing of America's best hospitals.
