= Dalton, Minnesota =

City in Minnesota, United States

Dalton
- City
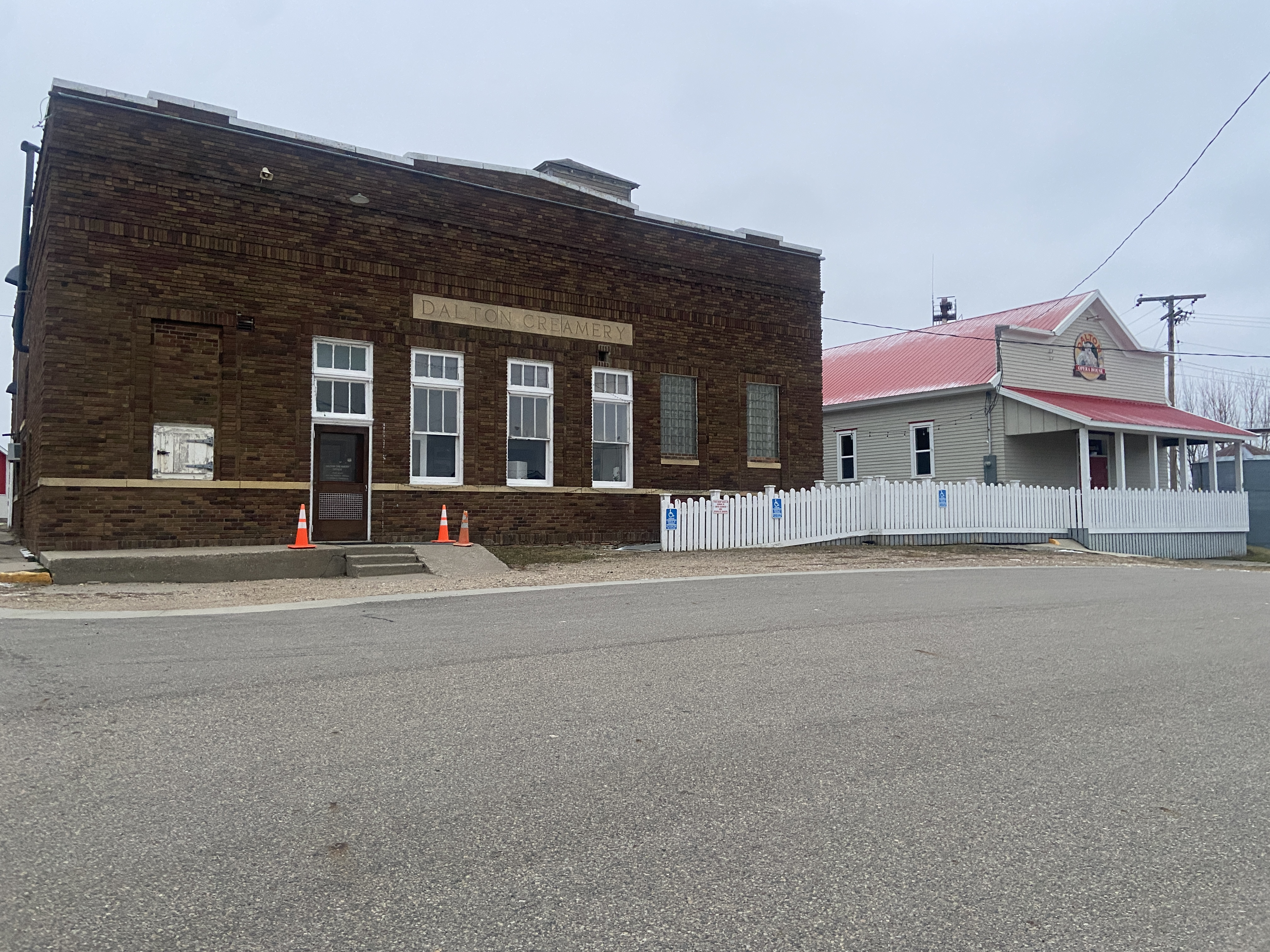
- Dalton Creamery and Opera House

- Location of Dalton, Minnesota
- Coordinates: 46°10′26″N 95°54′56″W
- Country: United States
- State: Minnesota
- County: Otter Tail
- Founded: 1882

Area
  - Total: 0.24 sq mi (0.61 km^{2})
  - Land: 0.24 sq mi (0.61 km^{2})
  - Water: 0 sq mi (0.00 km^{2})
- Elevation: 1,368 ft (417 m)

Population (2020)
  - Total: 215
  - Estimate (2021): 215
  - Density: 906.6/sq mi (350.04/km^{2})
- Time zone: UTC-6 (CST)
  - Summer (DST): UTC-5 (CDT)
- ZIP code: 56324
- Area code: 218
- FIPS code: 27-14626
- GNIS feature ID: 2393709

Dalton is a city in Otter Tail County, Minnesota, United States. The population was 215 at the 2020 census.

== History ==
Dalton was platted in 1882 by Ole C. Dahl, and named after him. A post office has been in operation at Dalton since 1882. Dalton was incorporated in 1905.

=== 2020 Tornado ===
On July 8, 2020, areas south and east of Dalton were struck by a violent EF4 tornado that significantly damaged or destroyed three farmsteads. There was one death, and two injuries.

== Geography ==
According to the United States Census Bureau, the city has a total area of 0.23 square miles (0.60 km^{2}), all land.

County Highways 12, 35, and 82 are three of the main routes in the community, and Interstate 94 is nearby.

== Demographics ==
Historical population
Census	Pop.	Note	%±
1910	175		—
1920	200		14.3%
1930	182		−9.0%
1940	226		24.2%
1950	279		23.5%
1960	239		−14.3%
1970	221		−7.5%
1980	248		12.2%
1990	234		−5.6%
2000	258		10.3%
2010	253		−1.9%
2020	215		−15.0%
2021 (est.)	215		0.0%
U.S. Decennial Census; 2020 Census

=== 2020 census ===
As of the census of 2020, there were 215 people, 135 households, and 117 housing units in the city.

=== 2010 census ===
As of the census of 2010, there were 253 people, 115 households, and 69 families living in the city. The population density was 1,100.0 inhabitants per square mile (424.7/km^{2}). There were 133 housing units at an average density of 578.3 per square mile (223.3/km^{2}). The racial makeup of the city was 98.8% White, 0.4% Asian, and 0.8% from two or more races. Hispanic or Latino of any race were 0.8% of the population.

There were 115 households, of which 26.1% had children under the age of 18 living with them, 40.0% were married couples living together, 15.7% had a female householder with no husband present, 4.3% had a male householder with no wife present, and 40.0% were non-families. 32.2% of all households were made up of individuals, and 10.4% had someone living alone who was 65 years of age or older. The average household size was 2.20 and the average family size was 2.72.

The median age in the city was 36.8 years. 22.9% of residents were under the age of 18; 8.6% were between the ages of 18 and 24; 30.8% were from 25 to 44; 24.1% were from 45 to 64; and 13.4% were 65 years of age or older. The gender makeup of the city was 49.8% male and 50.2% female.

=== 2000 census ===
As of the census of 2000, there were 258 people, 115 households, and 60 families living in the city. The population density was 1,077.3 inhabitants per square mile (415.9/km^{2}). There were 119 housing units at an average density of 496.9 per square mile (191.9/km^{2}). The racial makeup of the city was 98.84% White and 1.16% African American.

There were 115 households, out of which 28.7% had children under the age of 18 living with them, 40.0% were married couples living together, 7.8% had a female householder with no husband present, and 47.0% were non-families. 34.8% of all households were made up of individuals, and 21.7% had someone living alone who was 65 years of age or older. The average household size was 2.24 and the average family size was 2.92.

In the city, the population was spread out, with 26.0% under the age of 18, 12.4% from 18 to 24, 27.9% from 25 to 44, 15.1% from 45 to 64, and 18.6% who were 65 years of age or older. The median age was 34 years. For every 100 females, there were 95.5 males. For every 100 females age 18 and over, there were 85.4 males.

The median income for a household in the city was $29,750, and the median income for a family was $35,536. Males had a median income of $23,958 versus $20,208 for females. The per capita income for the city was $13,990. About 3.0% of families and 8.2% of the population were below the poverty line, including 4.9% of those under the age of eighteen and 5.1% of those 65 or over.

== Arts and culture ==
Dalton does not have its own schools. Children from the area attend schools in Fergus Falls, Ashby, or Underwood.

Each year, Dalton hosts an annual Summerfest Day the final weekend in June. During this celebration, an all-city rummage sale is held, a Relay for Life fundraising event is held in conjunction with a large softball tournament, and a street dance is held on that weekend's Saturday evening.

Dalton is also home to the Lake Region Pioneer Threshermen's Association, a group of enthusiasts who restore and display antique farming equipment—notably the threshing machine—during an annual show the weekend after Labor Day.
