= U.S. Route 12 in Minnesota =

Section of U.S. Numbered Highway in Minnesota, United States

U.S. Highway 12
- US 12 highlighted in red

Route information
- Maintained by MnDOT
- Length: 192.798 mi (310.278 km)
- Existed: November 11, 1926–present
- Tourist routes: Minnesota River Valley Scenic Byway

Major junctions
- West end: US 12 at the South Dakota state line in Ortonville
- US 75 in Ortonville; US 59 in Moyer Township; US 71 / MN 23 in Willmar; MN 22 in Litchfield; MN 24 in Litchfield; MN 15 in Dassel; MN 25 in Montrose; I-394 / I-494 in Minnetonka; I-94 / I-394 / US 52 in Minneapolis; I-494 / I-694 in Woodbury
- East end: I-94 / US 12 at the Wisconsin state line in Lakeland

Location
- Country: United States
- State: Minnesota
- Counties: Big Stone, Swift, Kandiyohi, Meeker, Wright, Hennepin, Ramsey, Washington

Highway system
- United States Numbered Highway System; List; Special; Divided; Minnesota Trunk Highway System; Interstate; US; State; Legislative; Scenic
← MN 11	→ MN 13

U.S. Highway 12 (US 12) is a 192.798-mile-long (310.278 km) United States Numbered Highway in west- and east-central Minnesota, which travels from the South Dakota state line at Ortonville near Big Stone Lake and continues east to the St. Croix River at the Wisconsin state line. US 12 connects the cities of Ortonville, Benson, Willmar, Litchfield, Minneapolis, and Saint Paul.

== Route description ==
From the South Dakota state line at Ortonville, to Orono in Minneapolis–Saint Paul, US 12 is mostly a rural two-lane highway with a 60-mile-per-hour (97 km/h) posted speed limit, with slower speed limits through towns and a four-lane surface arterial segment through the city of Willmar. From Orono to Wayzata, US 12 is a two-lane freeway/super-two bypass around Long Lake. From western Wayzata to Interstate 394 (I-394) in Minnetonka, US 12 is a six-lane freeway, with a posted speed limit of 65 mph (105 km/h). East of I-494 in Minnetonka, US 12 is invisibly concurrent with I-394 and I-94 through Minneapolis and Saint Paul to the Wisconsin state line at Hudson.

Legally, the Minnesota section of US 12 is defined as unmarked Constitutional / Legislative Routes 149, 26, and 10 in Minnesota Statutes §§ 161.115(80) and 161.114(2). US 12 is not marked with these legislative numbers along the actual highway.

== History ==
US 12 was established on November 11, 1926. In 1929, the only sections paved were between Litchfield and Willmar and between Wayzata through Minneapolis–Saint Paul to Wisconsin. The entire route was paved by 1940. Beginning in the 1950s, older sections of US 12 that ran through city centers were replaced with bypasses.

From 2006 to 2008, the US 12 two-lane freeway bypass was constructed through Orono and Long Lake. The new bypass ties into the existing US 12 freeway at the western edge of Wayzata.

== Major intersections ==
County	Location	mi	km	Exit	Destinations	Notes
Big Stone–Grant county line	Ortonville–Big Stone City line	0.000	0.000		US 12 west (Main Street) – Big Stone City, Milbank	Continuation into South Dakota
Big Stone	Ortonville	0.821	1.321		MN 7 west (2nd Street SE) / Minnesota River Valley Scenic Byway – Browns Valley	Western end of MN 7 concurrency
Big Stone	Ortonville	0.950	1.529		MN 7 east (SE 2nd Street) – Appleton	Eastern end of MN 7 concurrency
Big Stone	Ortonville	1.350	2.173		US 75 / Minnesota River Valley Scenic Byway – Wheaton, Madison	
Swift	Shible Township	21.097	33.952		MN 119 south – Appleton	
Swift	Moyer Township	27.088	43.594		US 59 – Morris, Appleton	
Swift	Benson	42.633	68.611		MN 29 south (Church Street) – Montevideo	Western end of MN 29 concurrency
Swift	Benson	42.860	68.976		MN 9 west (Atlantic Avenue) / MN 29 north (14th Street) – Morris, Starbuck	Eastern end of MN 29 concurrency; western end of MN 9 concurrency
Swift	Benson	42.930	69.089		MN 9 east (13th Street) – New London	Eastern end of MN 9 concurrency
Kandiyohi	Mamre Township	64.292	103.468		CSAH 7 – Sunburg	Former MN 104
Kandiyohi	Willmar	71.721	115.424		CSAH 5 (30th Street) to MN 40	
Kandiyohi	Willmar	72.606	116.848		Industrial Drive	Former MN 40; closed in 2009; access now via CSAH 5
Kandiyohi	Willmar	73.683	118.581		To US 71 Bus. / Bus. MN 23 / Glacial Ridge Trail	
Kandiyohi	Kandiyohi Township	75.696– 75.793	121.821– 121.977		US 71 / MN 23 – Sauk Centre, St. Cloud, Olivia, Granite Falls	Interchange
Meeker	Grove City	91.650	147.496		MN 4 south – Cosmos	Western end of MN 4 concurrency
Meeker	Swede Grove Township	92.261	148.480		MN 4 north – Paynesville	Eastern end of MN 4 concurrency
Meeker	Litchfield Township	98.757	158.934		MN 22 north – Eden Valley	Western end of MN 22 concurrency
Meeker	Litchfield Township	99.945	160.846		MN 24 north – Kimball	
Meeker	Litchfield	100.777	162.185		MN 22 south – Hutchinson	Eastern end of MN 22 concurrency
Meeker	Dassel Township	111.360	179.217		MN 15 – Kimball, Hutchinson	
Wright	Montrose	132.095	212.586		MN 25 south (Buffalo Avenue) – Watertown	Western end of MN 25 concurrency
Wright	Franklin Township	134.152	215.897		MN 25 north – Buffalo	Eastern end of MN 25 concurrency
Hennepin	Orono	148.655	239.237	—	CSAH 6 / CSAH 112 (Wayzata Boulevard)	Interchange; western end of freeway; former US 12 east / MN 110 south; also access to Long Lake, Orono
Hennepin	Wayzata			152	CSAH 112 – Long Lake, Orono	Westbound exit and eastbound entrance; former US 12; western end of eastbound HOV/toll lane
Hennepin	Wayzata			153	CSAH 15 west	Westbound exit and eastbound entrance
Hennepin	Wayzata	150.158	241.656	154	CSAH 101 (Central Avenue)	Former MN 101
Hennepin	Wayzata			155A-B	CSAH 101 south / CSAH 15 east – Wayzata	Westbound exit and eastbound entrance; former US 12 west / MN 101 south
Hennepin	Minnetonka			1A	Carlson Parkway / Linner Road	
Hennepin	Minnetonka	157.014	252.690	1A-B	I-494	Western end of I-394 concurrency; signed as exits 1A (south) and 1B (north); I-494 exits 19A-B; western end of westbound HOV/toll lane
Hennepin	See I-394					
Hennepin	Minneapolis	165.654	266.594		I-394 east – Downtown Minneapolis	Eastern end of I-394 concurrency; eastern end of HOV/toll lanes; eastbound exit and westbound entrance; I-394 exit 8B
Hennepin	Minneapolis	165.654	266.594		I-94 west / US 52 north	Western end of I-94 concurrency; I-94 exit 231A
Unmarked overlap with I-94 to Wisconsin state line
St. Croix River		192.997	310.599	Interstate Bridge		
St. Croix River		192.997	310.599		I-94 east / US 12 east – Eau Claire	Continuation into Wisconsin
1.000 mi = 1.609 km; 1.000 km = 0.621 mi: Concurrency terminus; Incomplete access

U.S. Route 12
Previous state: South Dakota	Minnesota	Next state: Wisconsin
