= Minnesota Department of Transportation =

Government agency in Minnesota, United States

Minnesota Department of Transportation (MnDOT)

Agency overview
- Jurisdiction: Minnesota
- Headquarters: 395 John Ireland Boulevard Saint Paul, Minnesota
- Agency executives: Nancy Daubenberger, Commissioner; Jean Wallace, Deputy Commissioner and Chief Engineer; Kim Collins, Deputy Commissioner & Chief Administrative Officer
- Parent agency: State of Minnesota
- Website: www.dot.state.mn.us

The Minnesota Department of Transportation (MnDOT, /mɪndɑːt/) oversees transportation by all modes including land, water, air, rail, walking and bicycling in the U.S. state of Minnesota. The cabinet-level agency is responsible for maintaining the state's trunk highway system (including state highways, U.S. Highways, and Interstate Highways), funding municipal airports and maintaining radio navigation aids, and other activities.

== History ==
Former seal used up until 2016

The agency's history can be traced to the state's Railroad and Warehouse Commission which emerged slowly from 1871 to 1905, and the State Highway Commission created in 1905. The Highway Commission was abolished in 1917 and replaced by a Department of Highways. The Minnesota Highway Department has been credited with numerous works listed on the U.S. National Register of Historic Places. For air transport, the Minnesota Aeronautics Commission was created in 1933. Much of the railroad oversight was transferred to the Minnesota Department of Public Service in 1967. Two years later, the Minnesota Department of Public Safety was established and took over the Highway Patrol and Driver's License Bureau. MnDOT finally came into being in 1976 and took over the functions of the aeronautics and highway departments, plus transportation-related duties of the Minnesota State Planning Agency and Department of Public Service.

== Services and projects ==
MnDOT operates networks of ramp meters and traffic cameras in the Minneapolis-St. Paul metropolitan area in order to manage traffic flow. The department has also put up informational electronic signage along highways to provide alert messages. Message boards have been in Rochester, Duluth and the Twin Cities for some time. Part of the reason for the Rochester signs is occasional flooding of U.S. Highway 52. The department expanded use of the signs after Amber alert legislation allocated funding for larger networks. In the Twin Cities, MnDOT began using them to display freeway travel times in 2003 or 2004 to help drivers plan alternate routes to avoid heavy traffic if necessary (although a generic message like "buckle up for safety" is sometimes encountered during special safety campaigns planned in conjuncture with the State Patrol and Department of Public Safety).

Twin Cities Public Television (TPT) station KTCI channel 17 has been used for many years to display weather-related information that is funded by MnDOT. This service is continued on channel 2-4 following the digital transition. The department also had a long-standing partnership with KBEM-FM radio (88.5 FM) in Minneapolis to relay area traffic information, although that relationship is coming to an end. After public outcry, the term was extended, but it is unclear how long the two organizations will continue the relationship. MnDOT paid KBEM-FM $400,000 per year to provide the information, about half of the station's annual budget. Video from traffic cameras is also shown on cable television systems in the metro area (at one time, this had also been shown on KVBM channel 45, today known as KSTC).

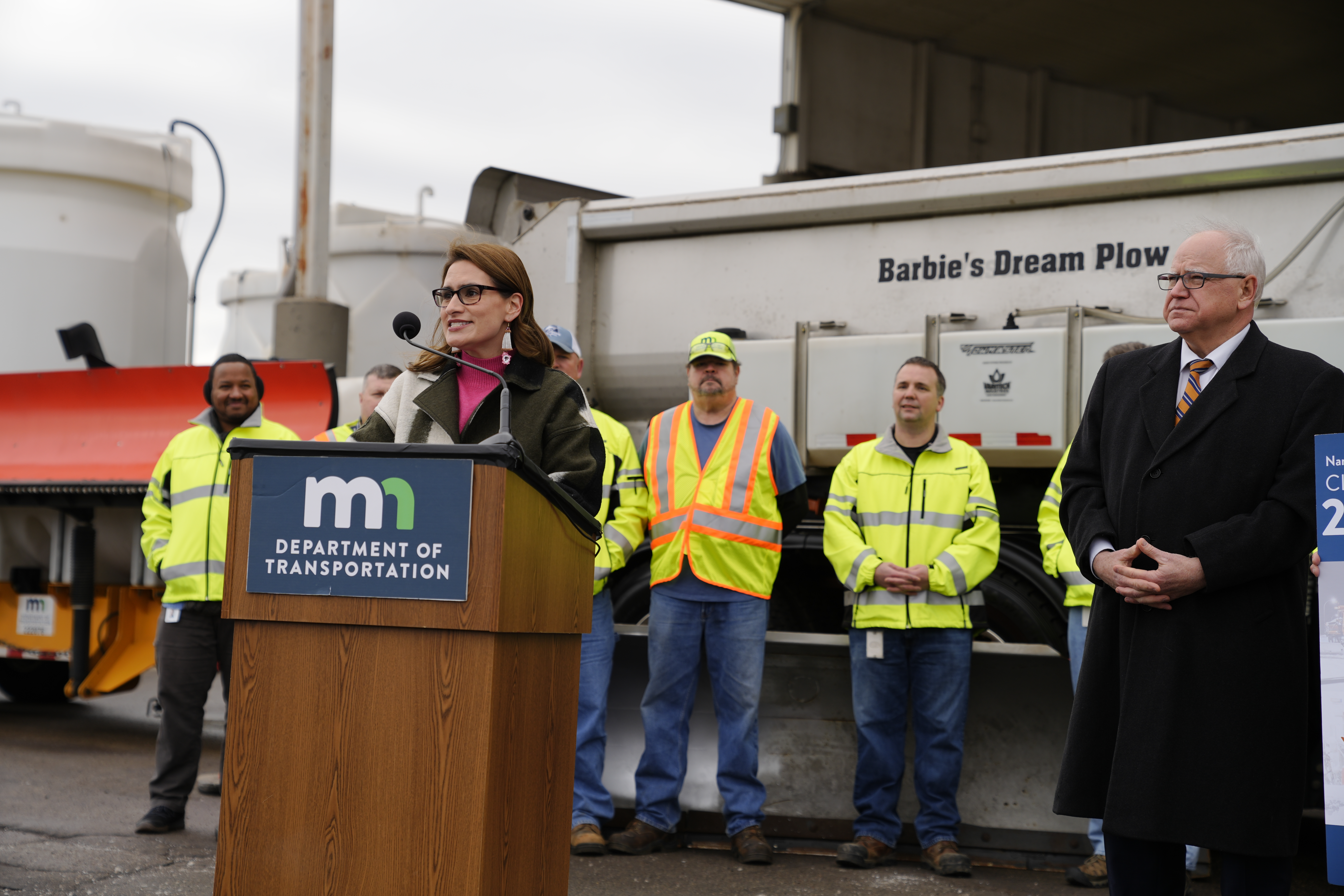
Induction of "Barbie's Dream Plow" at the 2024 snowplow contest winners' announcement

The department holds an annual contest, asking the public to name new snowplows introduced to the fleet. In 2021, 24,000 submissions were received. 2021's winning snowplow names included Plowy McPlowFace; Ope, Just Gonna Plow Right Past Ya; Duck Duck Orange Duck; and The Truck Formerly Known As Plow. 2024 winners included Taylor Drift, Barbie's Dream Plow, and Waipahinte (Dakota for "snowplow").

After years of mounting delays and management concerns over the Metro Green Line Extension, the Minnesota state legislature in 2024 passed a provision giving MnDOT more oversight of light rail projects in the state.

== Organization ==
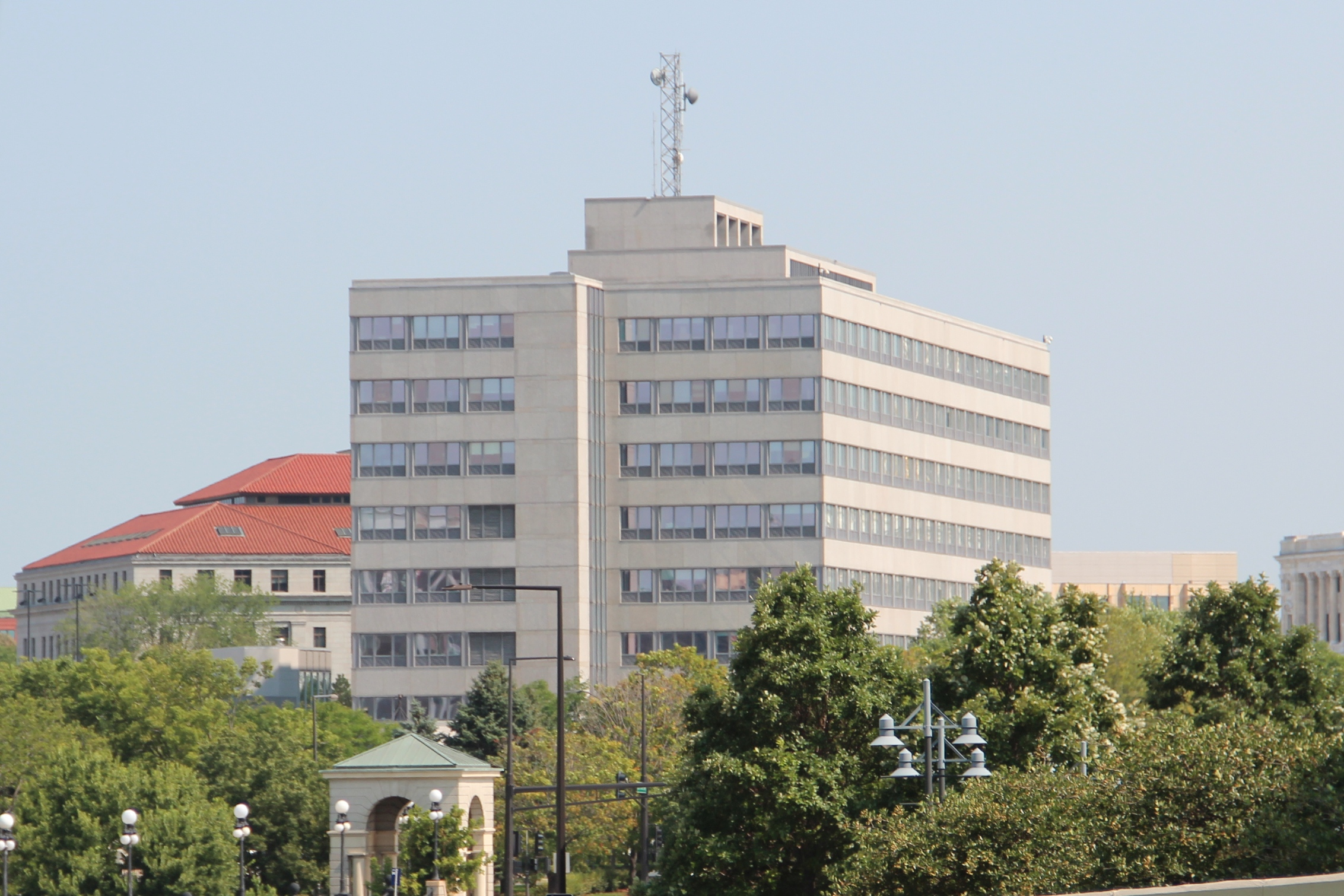
MnDOT headquarters in Saint Paul

MnDOT is led by the commissioner of transportation, who is appointed by the governor for a term coinciding with the governor's. The commissioner may appear as a party on behalf of the public in any proceeding before any governmental agency regulating public services or rates relating to transportation. The commissioner also provides technical and financial assistance to the Metropolitan Council and regional development commissions in the regional transportation planning process.

=== List of commissioners ===
Below is a list of Minnesota Highway Department (1917–1976) and Minnesota Department of Transportation (1976–present) commissioners:

- Charles M. Babcock (1917–1932)
- N. (Nels) W. Elsberg (1933–1938)
- M. (Michael) J. Hoffman (1939–1957)
- L. P. Zimmerman (1957–1961)
- James C. Marshall (1961–1965)
- John R. Jamieson (1965–1967)
- N. T. (Nils Theodore) Waldor (1968–1971)
- Ray Lappegaard (1971–1974)
- Frank Marzitelli (1974–1976)
- James Harrington (1976–1978)
- Dick Braun (1978–1986)
- Leonard Levine (1986–1991)
- John H. Riley (1991)
- James Denn (1991–1999)
- Elwyn Tinklenberg (1999–2002)
- Carol Molnau (2003–2008)
- Thomas K. "Tom" Sorel (2008–2012)
- Bernard J. "Bernie" Arseneau (2012), interim commissioner
- Charles A. Zelle (2013–2019)
- Margaret Anderson Kelliher (2019–2022)
- Nancy Daubenberger (2022–)

=== Districts ===
MnDOT is divided into eight construction districts, with each district responsible for highway construction projects, maintenance, and highway right-of-way issues for their area. Each district has a district area headquarters as well as a secondary maintenance area office.

District #	Location	District office	Secondary office(s)
1	Northeast	Duluth	Virginia
2	Northwest	Bemidji	Crookston
3	Central	St. Cloud	Baxter
4	West Central	Morris	Detroit Lakes
M / (5+9)	Metro	St. Paul	Minneapolis
6	Southeast	Rochester	Owatonna
7	South Central	Mankato	Windom
8	Southwest	Willmar	Hutchinson, Marshall

== See also ==
- Minnesota Road Research Facility
- MnPASS
