= List of county roads in Hennepin County, Minnesota =

- Standard county road marker

Highway names
- Interstates: Interstate X (I-X)
- US Highways: U.S. Highway X (US X)
- State: Trunk Highway X (MN X or TH X)
- County State-Aid Highways: County State-Aid Highway X (CSAH X)
- County Roads: County Road X (CR X)

System links
- County roads of Minnesota; Hennepin County

Hennepin County, Minnesota, United States maintains a number of county roads, many of them county state aid highways (CSAH). This includes a number of streets through the city of Minneapolis.

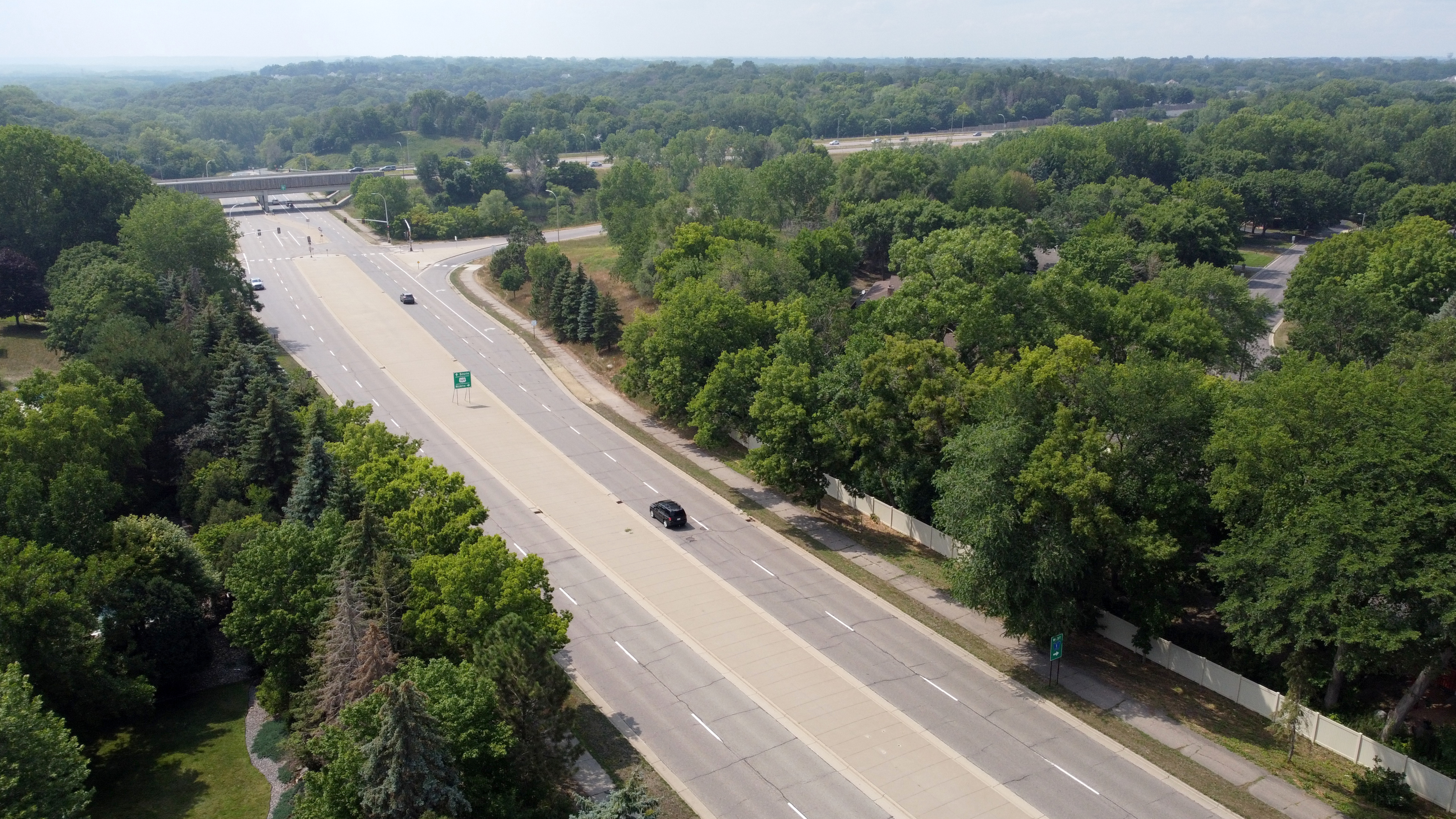
County Road 1 (Old Shakopee Road) at U.S. Highway 169

== CR 1–CR 25 ==
County Road 1 serves Bloomington and Eden Prairie. On its east end, it starts as 24th Avenue South, at Interstate 494, and heads south adjacent to the Mall of America. It then continues as Old Shakopee Road (and a short bit of 98th Street) for the rest of its route through the south side of Bloomington. Old Shakopee Road was once an Indian trail connecting Fort Snelling with Shakopee. Many of the structures in Bloomington's history were built on Old Shakopee Road, including the town hall (1892), the Baillif hotel and store, and a Grange hall. Old Shakopee Road itself used to be parts of Constitutional Routes 5 and 52. On the western border of Bloomington, County Road 1 turns north, follows U.S. Highway 169 for a short distance, and then becomes Pioneer Trail, crossing Eden Prairie to the Carver County line and continuing as Carver County Road 14.

County Road 2 is Penn Avenue North in north Minneapolis from Interstate 394 to 44th Avenue North (County Road 152).

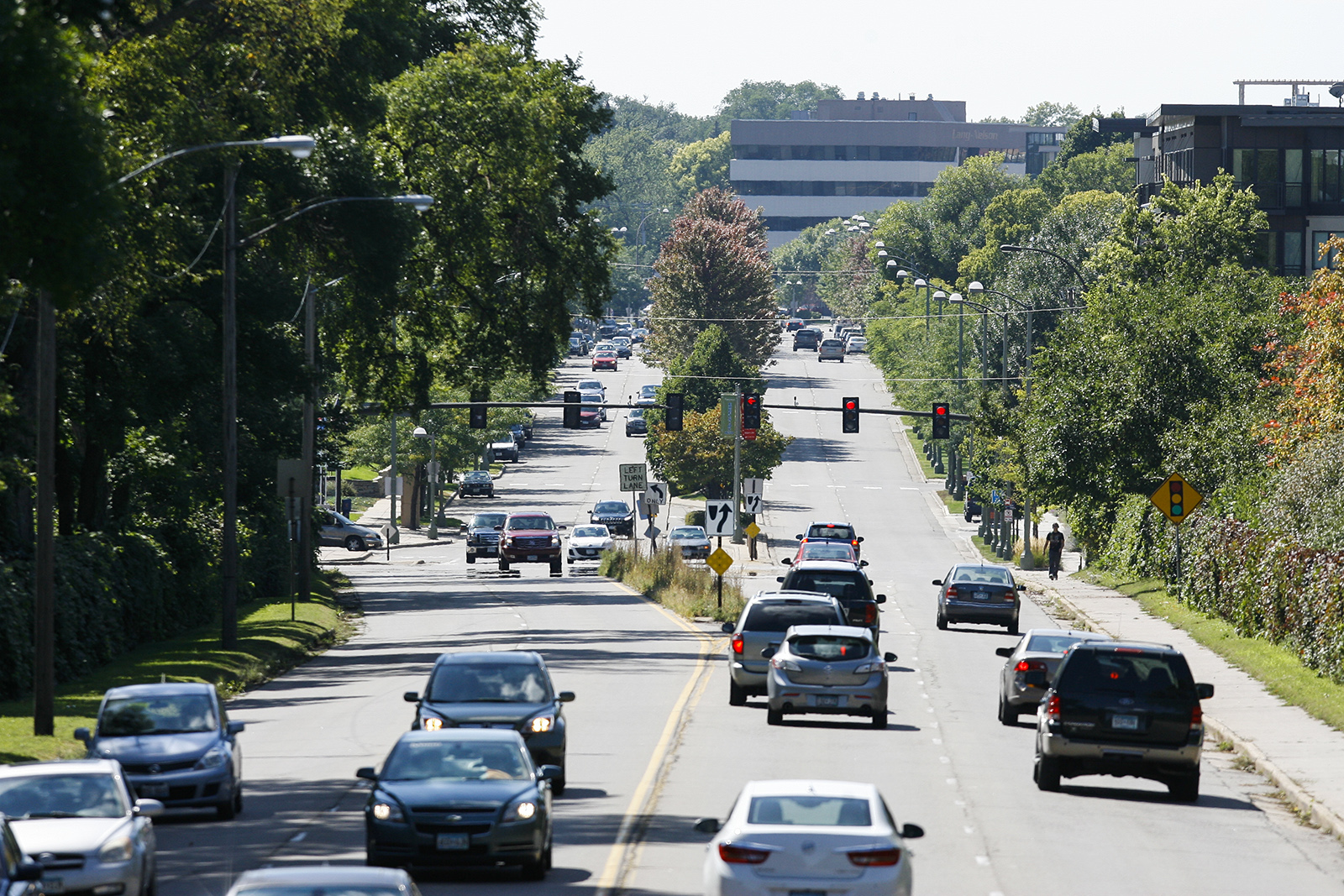
View of Excelsior Boulevard (Hennepin County Road 3) looking southwest from the bridge at the Minikahda Club toward St. Louis Park, 2014. The nearest intersection shown is at France Avenue (Hennepin County Road 17).

County Road 3 begins in Minneapolis at the Mississippi River, and follows Lake Street west through most of Minneapolis. Just west of Bde Maka Ska, it turns southwest and follows Excelsior Boulevard. (The north branch of this Y-shaped intersection is a continuation of Lake Street and is County Road 25.) Excelsior Boulevard continues westward through St. Louis Park, Hopkins, and into Minnetonka, ending at County Road 101, just east of its namesake town of Excelsior. Lake Street was originally used as a path for soldiers traveling from Fort Snelling to Bde Maka Ska. In 1856, the Minnesota Territorial Legislature established a territorial road "from Minneapolis to Glencoe via Lake Calhoun, near Bass Lake, to John P. Miller's, and then by the way of Excelsior to Glencoe, to be known as the Glencoe Road." This was known as Territorial Road #3. Pioneers used this road as an oxcart trail to travel to Carver County and McLeod County. Around 1935, State Highway 7 (MN 7) was built north of Excelsior Boulevard, and the segment west of State Highway 100 (MN 100) reverted to county control. East of Highway 100 remained under state control as part of U.S. Highway 169, to which U.S. Highway 212 was added in 1934. U.S. 169 was moved off Excelsior Boulevard around 1981, while U.S. 212 was moved off around 1983. Segments of Excelsior Boulevard and Lake Street remained under state maintenance until 1988.

County Road 4 runs along Eden Prairie Road from southern Minnetonka to Eden Prairie to County Road 1, where a newly completed section of road connects County Road 4 to Spring Road, eliminating an overlapping stretch with County Road 1. County Road 4 then follows Spring Road to Flying Cloud Drive (old U.S. Highway 212).

County Road 5 is divided into two disjointed sections. The western section is Minnetonka Boulevard from County Road 101 in western Minnetonka to the junction with County Road 25 and France Avenue South at the border between St. Louis Park and Minneapolis. The eastern section is Franklin Avenue in Minneapolis from Lyndale Avenue South to East River Road, where County Road 5 follows 27th Avenue South to University Avenue S.E. Previous sections of County Road 5 turned over to municipal control include a section west of County Road 101 to Vine Hill Road in Deephaven, following Vine Hill Road to State Highway 7 (MN 7), and a section that connected the two disjoint sections of County Road 5, passing between Cedar Lake and Lake Of The Isles in Minneapolis.

County Road 6 begins at State Highway 55 (MN 55) in Plymouth and runs through northern Orono and southern Independence before crossing the Carver County line and continuing as Carver County Road 20.

County Road 8 is West Broadway Avenue between County Road 9 in Robbinsdale and County Road 130 in Brooklyn Park, about 1/4 mile beyond an intersection with County Road 81. Most of County Road 8 was an original state highway that later became part of U.S. Highway 10, but the state built a new roadway in 1934 to replace what is now County Road 8.

County Road 9 is Rockford Road from County Road 152 in north Minneapolis to State Highway 55 (MN 55) in Plymouth, where it continues beyond Highway 55 as County Road 24. Most of this highway was the original route of Highway 55 until the current Highway 55 between Medina and downtown Minneapolis was built in 1954.

County Road 10 runs along Bass Lake Road from State Highway 100 (MN 100) in Brooklyn Center to County Road 101 in Maple Grove, then extending westward through Corcoran, Burschville, and Greenfield before ending at County Road 50 in Rockford.

County Road 11 begins in Loretto and runs through northern Independence and past the Lake Rebecca Park Reserve before crossing the Wright County line and continuing as Wright County Road 30 into Delano.

County Road 12 is Noble Parkway from County Road 109 / 85th Avenue North in Brooklyn Park to 109th Avenue North, then follows West River Road through Champlin to a 1/4-mile concurrent stretch with U.S. Highway 169, then follows Dayton River Road through Dayton, where it continues into Wright County as Wright County Road 42. The West River Road segment of County Road 12 was previously old U.S. 169 until the late 1970s, then part of State Highway 252 (MN 252) until State Highway 610 (MN 610) was completed in 1999 between the Richard P. Braun Bridge and Osseo. Much of County Road 12 is concurrent with the Great River Road throughout Champlin and Dayton in northern Hennepin County.

County Road 13 is Brockton Lane in Dayton between the County Road 81 / County Road 101 junction and County Road 12. This road was previously State Highway 101 (MN 101) until Highway 101 was rerouted to its current route about 1 mile west in 1968.

County Road 14 is Zane Avenue North from Brooklyn Boulevard in Brooklyn Park to West River Road in Champlin. County Road 14 originally extended southeast along Brooklyn Boulevard, through Brooklyn Center, to the Minneapolis city line, before old State Highway 152 (MN 152) was created in 1934.

County Road 15 is divided into two disjoint sections. The western section begins at the west junction of U.S. Highway 12 in Wayzata and heads westward through Minnetonka Beach, Spring Park, Mound, and Minnetrista before crossing the Carver County line and continuing as Carver County Road 24. The eastern section is Gleason Lake Road from the east junction of U.S. 12 in Wayzata to Vicksburg Lane at the Plymouth / Minnetonka border. Previous sections of County Road 15 include a section connecting the two disjoint sections of County Road 15 along Shoreline Drive, Lake Street East, Superior Boulevard, and Wayzata Boulevard in Wayzata, and a section extending east of Vicksburg Lane along Gleason Lake Road and Sunset Trail in Plymouth to State Highway 55 (MN 55).

County Road 16 begins at the intersection of Interstate 494 and County Road 5 and runs alongside Interstate 494 to McGinty Road, where it follows McGinty Road to County Road 101 in Wayzata. Previous segments of County 16 include a westward extension along McGinty Road to Superior Boulevard in Wayzata and an eastward extension along County Road 5 and County Road 61, then east along Cedar Lake Road to Glenwood Avenue in downtown Minneapolis. This east segment was re-routed at various times due to the upgrade of U.S. Highway 12 (now Interstate 394) in downtown Minneapolis to freeway standards and to the construction of Interstate 494.

County Road 17 is France Avenue South between Excelsior Boulevard in Minneapolis and Old Shakopee Road in Bloomington. There was a second disjoint section of County 17 that ran along France Avenue between Minnetonka Boulevard and Cedar Lake Road in Minneapolis. The segment of County 17 between Excelsior Boulevard and West 54th Street. (later shortened to West 50th Street) was previously old State Highway 121 (MN 121).

County Road 18 was a former county route that ran from the Bloomington Ferry Bridge northbound to Osseo. It was renumbered in 1988 as part of the new alignment of U.S. Highway 169 in the Minneapolis area. U.S. 169 was rerouted along the former route of County 18. Present day County Road 18 is now 5th Avenue North in Hopkins.

County Road 19 begins at State Highway 7 (MN 7) in Excelsior and dissects Lake Minnetonka through Tonka Bay and Orono, then continues northward through Independence, Maple Plain, Medina, Loretto, Corcoran, and Hanover, before crossing into Wright County at the Crow River and continuing northward as Wright County Road 19 through St. Michael and Albertville.

County Road 20 is Blake Road between State Highway 7 (MN 7) and Excelsior Boulevard in Hopkins. A previous segment of County Road 20 extended southward along Blake Road from Excelsior Boulevard to Interlachen Boulevard, then following Interlachen Boulevard to Vernon Avenue near the interchange of Vernon Avenue with State Highway 100 (MN 100). Another previous segment was a disjoint segment in Minneapolis beginning at France Avenue and followed 44th Street, Sheridan Avenue, Bde Maka Ska Parkway, 35th Street, and Hennepin Avenue, ending at the Lowry Hill Tunnel.

County Road 21 is West 50th Street from France Avenue South to Lyndale Avenue South in Minneapolis. This segment was previously a part of State Highway 190, then later old State Highway 121 (MN 121). County Road 21 was numbered to maintain identity with the former Highway 121.

County Road 22 is Lyndale Avenue South from West 58th Street (at the end of present-day State Highway 121 / MN 121) to Franklin Avenue in Minneapolis (near the Lowry Hill Tunnel). The segment from Franklin Avenue to Lake Street was previously the routing of old U.S. Highway 169 until the late 1970s. The segment from Lake Street to West 58th Street was previously old U.S. Highway 65, then old State Highway 190. When Highway 190 was decommissioned, Highway 121 was rerouted along Lyndale Avenue South from West 50th Street to West 58th Street, then turned over to Hennepin County maintenance when Highway 121 was shortened to the freeway stub from the intersection of Lyndale Avenue South and West 58th Street to the interchange of Interstate 35W and State Highway 62 (MN 62) at the Minneapolis–Richfield city boundary line.

County Road 23 is Marshall Street NE from Hennepin Avenue to 37th Avenue NE in Minneapolis, where it continues northward into Anoka County and Fridley as East River Road (Anoka County Road 1). The segment of County Road 23 to the north of Plymouth Avenue is concurrent with the Great River Road.

County Road 24 begins at the intersection of State Highway 55 (MN 55) and County Road 9 in Plymouth and runs west through Medina before ending at County Road 19 in the Baker Park Reserve.

County Road 25 is the decommissioned segment of old State Highway 7 (MN 7) between State Highway 100 (MN 100) in St. Louis Park and the intersection of Lake Street and Excelsior Boulevard near Bde Maka Ska in Minneapolis.

== CR 26–CR 50 ==
County Road 26 (non-CSAH) is a road in Minnetrista that begins at County 110 and extends westward to the Carver County line, where it continues as an unnumbered road for approximately 1/4 mile before it ends at Carver County Road 20.

County Road 27 is two disjoint sections of Stinson Boulevard in Minneapolis. The northern section runs from 37th Avenue NE to St. Anthony Boulevard. The southern section runs from New Brighton Boulevard to Hennepin Avenue.

County Road 28 is East Bush Lake Road and Bush Lake Road in Bloomington from Interstate 494 to County 1. This road provides access to the Hyland-Bush-Anderson Lakes Park Reserve.

County Road 29 is Town Line Road in Maple Plain from U.S. Highway 12 to County 19. This is a stub that allows travelers from Baker Park Reserve via County 19 more direct access to U.S. 12 by bypassing residential areas of Maple Plain.

County Road 30 follows 93rd Avenue North from Zane Avenue (County 14) in Brooklyn Park to Interstate 94 in Maple Grove, then extending westward to 97th Avenue North in Corcoran before ending at County 19. A previous section of County 30 extended eastward along 93rd Avenue North past Zane Avenue North (at one time running concurrently with Zane Avenue North, then 95th Avenue North, then back to 93rd Avenue North via two sharp curves) to West River Road. This section was shortened to State Highway 252 (MN 252) upon the opening of the State Highway 610 (MN 610) bridge over the Mississippi River in 1987, then decommissioned upon the extension of Highway 610 to Osseo in 1999.

County Road 31 is Xerxes Avenue South from West 50th Street (County 21) in Minneapolis to West 66th Street in Edina, then York Avenue South to West 76th Street, then back to Xerxes Avenue South to American Boulevard in Bloomington.

County Road 32 is Penn Avenue South from State Highway 62 (MN 62) in Richfield to Old Shakopee Road (County 1) in Bloomington. A previous segment of County 32 extended north of Highway 62 to West 50th Street in Minneapolis.

County Road 33 is Park Avenue South in Minneapolis from West 46th Street to Washington Avenue (County 152). This route is one-way northbound. Southbound traffic uses the parallel Portland Avenue South (County 35).

County Road 34 is Normandale Boulevard in Bloomington from the intersection of Interstate 494 and State Highway 100 (MN 100) to Old Shakopee Road (County 1). A previous segment of County 34 extended beyond Old Shakopee Road to the Dan Patch Line Bridge, a combined highway / railroad bridge across the Minnesota River that was closed to vehicular traffic in the late 1970s.

County Road 35 is Portland Avenue South from Washington Avenue in downtown Minneapolis to Old Shakopee Road (County 1) in Bloomington. The segment of County 35 from Washington Avenue to West 46th Street is one-way southbound. Northbound traffic in this segment is diverted to Park Avenue South (County 33).

County Road 36 is University Avenue S.E. in Minneapolis from Interstate 35W to the Saint Paul city limits boundary line. The segment of County 36 from Interstate 35W to Oak Street is one-way eastbound. Westbound traffic uses the parallel 4th Street S.E. (County 37). Interstate 35W was closed south of its interchange with County 36 after the August 1, 2007 bridge collapse, and reopened upon completion of the replacement bridge on September 18, 2008. An anomaly existed in the late-1980s and early-1990s when old U.S. 52 was routed on University Avenue, then was turned to county maintenance and became County 36 (and 37 on 4th Street S.E.), creating a gap in U.S. 52. U.S. 52 became a continuous route again when it was rerouted along Interstate 94 from downtown Minneapolis to downtown Saint Paul in 1995.

County Road 37 is 4th Street S.E. in Minneapolis from Oak Street to Interstate 35W. This route is one-way westbound. Eastbound traffic uses University Avenue S.E. (County 36).

County Road 38 was 38th Street in Minneapolis from Hiawatha Avenue (State Highway 55 / MN 55) to Lyndale Avenue South (County 22) and 35th Street from Lyndale Avenue South to Hennepin Avenue South, now maintained by the city of Minneapolis.

County Road 39 is Valley View Road in Eden Prairie between CR 60 (Mitchell Road) and U.S. Highway 212 (Flying Cloud Drive). It crosses Interstate 494 at exit number 12. A previous segment of County 39 extended beyond U.S. 212 to U.S. Highway 169.

County Road 40 is Glenwood Avenue from State Highway 55 (MN 55) in Golden Valley to 8th Street near the Target Center in downtown Minneapolis.

County Road 42 is East 42nd Street in Minneapolis from Cedar Avenue (County 152) to Minnehaha Avenue (County 48).

County Road 43 is Lagoon Avenue in Minneapolis from Dupont Avenue South to E. Bde Maka Ska Parkway. Formerly a two-way city street, this was converted to one-way westbound to handle westbound traffic on Lake Street (County 3) due to high traffic volume in the area. County 3 between E. Bde Maka Ska Parkway and Dupont Avenue South is one-way eastbound.

County Road 44 runs from State Highway 7 (MN 7) in Minnetrista to County 110 in Mound, passing between Halsted Bay and Priests Bay in Lake Minnetonka.

County Road 46 is two disjoint sections of East 46th Street in Minneapolis. The first section runs from Lyndale Avenue South (County 22) to Cedar Avenue (County 152). This route was previously old State Highway 190 before Highway 190 was shifted to another route, then decommissioned. The second section runs between Minnehaha Avenue and the Ford Bridge over the Mississippi River towards Saint Paul, where it turns into Ramsey County Road 42.

County Road 47 is 62nd Avenue North in Plymouth from Brockton Lane (County Road 101) to Northwest Boulevard (County Road 61).

County Road 48 is Minnehaha Avenue in Minneapolis from East 46th Street (County 46) to East 28th Street, then 26th Avenue South from East 28th Street to Franklin Avenue (County 5).

County Road 49 was a route that ran along South Diamond Lake Road in Dayton from County 12 to County 13, then ran concurrent with County 13 to 129th Avenue North, then followed 129th Avenue North into Rogers. When Interstate 94 was constructed in the early 1970s, County 49 was rerouted north of 129th Avenue North along the north frontage road of Interstate 94 and terminated at State Highway 101 (MN 101), but Hennepin County continued to maintain the segment of 129th Avenue North in Rogers between County 150 and the present County 81 as County 49, creating an anomaly of two disjoint sections of County 49 that had their western termini on the same highway (County 150 and Highway 101 form 1 continuous road). Both disjoint segments of County 49 were decommissioned in 2006.

County Road 50 begins at County 10 in Corcoran and runs through Greenfield to Rockford, where it then runs along the east bank of the Crow River through the Lake Rebecca Park Reserve to the Wright County line, where the road continues as Wright County Road 17 into Delano.

== CR 51–CR 75 ==
County Road 51 is North Shore Drive in Orono from County 15 to County 19, then running concurrent with County 19 along Shadywood Road to Sunset Drive, then following Sunset Drive back to County 15 in Spring Park.

County Road 52 is used to indicate two separate roads that have no apparent connection to one another. The northern County 52 is Hennepin Avenue in Minneapolis from Washington Avenue (County 152) near the Hennepin Avenue Bridge to the Ramsey County line, where it continues as Larpenteur Avenue (Ramsey County Road 30). The southern County 52 is Nicollet Avenue South from East 61st Street in Minneapolis to Old Shakopee Road (County 1) in Bloomington. Previously, the southern segment of County 52 stretched north of East 61st Street to Lake Street in Minneapolis.

County Road 53 is 66th Street from France Avenue South (County 17) in Edina to State Highway 77 (MN 77) in Richfield near the MSP airport.

County Road 54 was 28th Avenue South in Minneapolis from Hiawatha Avenue (State Highway 55 / MN 55) to State Highway 62 (MN 62), now maintained by the city of Minneapolis.

County Road 55 was Auto Club Road in Bloomington from Bloomington Ferry Road (then marked as County 18) to Normandale Boulevard (then County 34) When the new U.S. 169 Bloomington Ferry Bridge was opened in 1996, County 55 was decommissioned and turned over to city maintenance, along with the decommissioning of County 18 and the truncation of County 34 to County 1.

County Road 57 begins at the intersection of State Highway 100 (MN 100) and County 10 in Brooklyn Center and follows 57th Avenue North to Humboldt Avenue, then follows Humboldt Avenue to 44th Avenue North (County 152) in Minneapolis. A previous segment of County 57 extended south of 44th Avenue North on Fremont Avenue to West Broadway (currently County 81). Fremont Avenue between 33rd Avenue and West Broadway is one-way southbound. Northbound traffic in this section uses Emerson Avenue (then County 58).

County Road 58 was Emerson Avenue between West Broadway (currently County 81) and 33rd Avenue in Minneapolis. This is one-way northbound. Southbound traffic uses Fremont Avenue (then County 57).

County Road 60 is Baker Road from Minnetonka Boulevard (County 5) in Minnetonka to State Highway 5 (MN 5) in Eden Prairie.

County Road 61 runs north–south and has several alternate names along its route:

- From its northern junction with County Road 130 in Maple Grove, it is known as Hemlock Lane.
- Just north of its junction with County Road 10 (Bass Lake Road), just north of the boundary with Plymouth it becomes Northwest Boulevard and continues under that name until its junction with State Highway 55 (MN 55).
- Between Highway 55 and the boundary with Minnetonka it is known as Xenium Lane.
- Between the Minnetonka boundary and County Road 5 (Minnetonka Boulevard), it is known as Plymouth Road.
- South of Minnetonka Boulevard, it changes names again to Shady Oak Road and continues into Eden Prairie. County Road 61 ends at U.S. Highway 212, but Shady Oak Road itself continues for a short distance into the "Golden Triangle" area of Eden Prairie and ends at Valley View Road.
- Once U.S. Highway 212 was shifted onto its new freeway alignment in 2008 through Eden Prairie and Chaska, the old alignment (Flying Cloud Drive) took on the designation of County Road 61 continuing to the county line with Carver County.

County Road 62 is Townline Road on the Eden Prairie / Minnetonka boundary line from the intersection of Interstate 494 and State Highway 62 (MN 62) to County 101. Before 1988, County 62 included the current State Highway 62 (which was numbered after County 62 to maintain identity despite the existence of another State Highway 62 in southwestern Minnesota). County 62 was extended west of Baker Road (County 60) to County 101 upon reconstruction of Townline Road in the mid-1980s.

County Road 66 begins at Douglas Drive (County 102) in Golden Valley and follows Duluth Street to Golden Valley Road, then follows Golden Valley Road to West Broadway in north Minneapolis, then follows West Broadway and Broadway Street to Stinson Boulevard. (County 27). The segment of West Broadway between Golden Valley Road and Washington Avenue runs concurrent with County 81 and is signed in this segment as County 81 only.

County Road 67 was the current County 62 from Baker Road (County 60) to Interstate 494 on the Eden Prairie–Minnetonka boundary line. This road was renumbered as County 62 when the segment of then-County 62 (now State Highway 62/MN 62) between Shady Oak Road (County 61) and Interstate 494 opened in 1986 and County 62 was then extended westward.

County Road 68 was Main Street in Hopkins from Excelsior Boulevard (County 3) to Washington Avenue (former County 18), decommissioned and partially removed when then-County 18 (now U.S. Highway 169) was upgraded to a freeway between Minnetonka Boulevard (County 5) and 7th Street West.

County Road 70 is Medicine Lake Road along the boundary line of Golden Valley with Crystal and New Hope from Douglas Drive (County 102) to U.S. Highway 169. A previous section of County 70 extended into Plymouth west of U.S. 169 (then County 18) along Medicine Lake Road to East Medicine Lake Boulevard, then along East Medicine Lake Boulevard to South Shore Drive, then South Shore Drive through the city of Medicine Lake to State Highway 55 (MN 55).

County Road 73 begins at State Highway 7 (MN 7) in Hopkins and follows Hopkins Crossroad through Minnetonka to Sunset Trail (formerly Gleason Lake Road, and Country Road 15) in Plymouth, then Sunset Trail to State Highway 55 (MN 55).

== CR 76–CR 100 ==
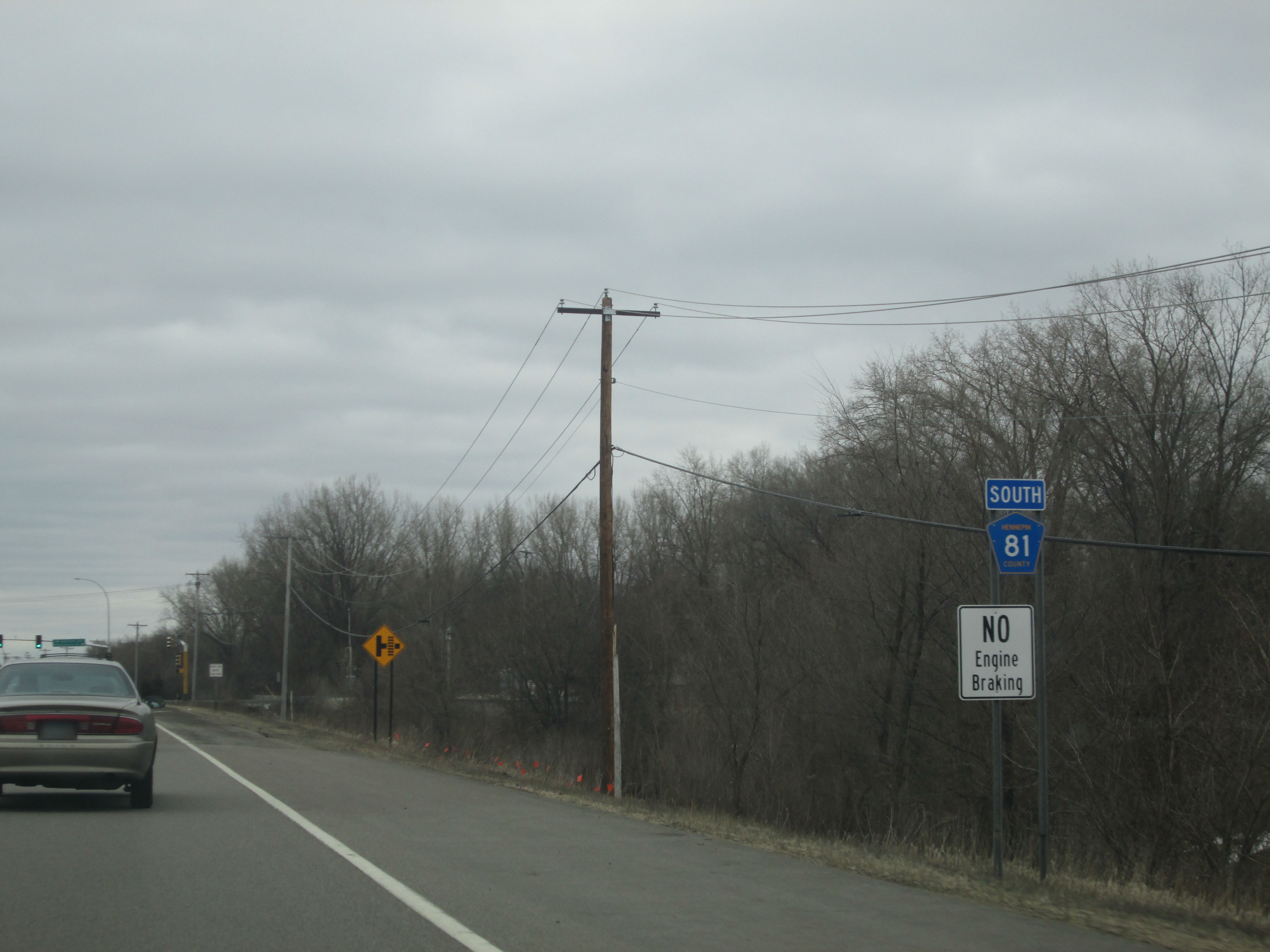
County Road 81 in Brooklyn Park, heading southbound.

County Road 81 runs from MN 101 (Main Street) in Rogers to Washington Avenue North in Minneapolis, turned over to Hennepin County maintenance along with part of old State Highway 101 (MN 101) in the 1988 highway swap for what is now U.S. Highway 169 and State Highway 62 (MN 62). Portions of County Road 81 are known in the present day as West Broadway and Bottineau Boulevard. The route was once maintained by the state, and formerly known as US 52, US 169, MN 101, MN 152 and MN 218 at various points in time prior to 1988.

County Road 82 is Mill Street in Shorewood from State Highway 7 (MN 7) to the Carver County line, where it continues as Carver County Road 17.

County Road 83 is Halgren Road from U.S. Highway 12 in Maple Plain to County 6 in Independence, where it continues past County 6 as County 110.

County Road 84 is a series of roads in Orono beginning at North Shore Drive (County 51) and passing north of Stubbs Bay on Lake Minnetonka before ending at County 19.

County Road 88 is New Brighton Boulevard from Broadway Street in Minneapolis to the Ramsey County line in St. Anthony, where it continues as an unmarked state-maintained highway that merges into Interstate 35W. This route was previously old U.S. Highway 8 before 1981 and State Highway 88 between 1981 and 1996, when Hennepin County maintenance took over its section of County 88.

County Road 90 runs between County 11 and County 6 in Independence.

County Road 92 is a series of roads beginning at County 50 in Rockford, passing through Greenfield, Independence, Minnetrista, and St. Bonifacius before ending at the Carver County line and continuing as Carver County Road 92.

County Road 93 is 37th Avenue NE in St. Anthony between Silver Lake Road (County 136) and the Ramsey County line, where it continues as County Road D.

County Road 94 is 29th Avenue NE in St. Anthony between New Brighton Boulevard (County 88) and the Ramsey County line, where it continues as County Road C.

== CR 101 and up ==
County Road 101 is a segment of old State Highway 101 turned over to Hennepin County maintenance in segments from County Road 81 to Wayzata in 1988 and from Wayzata to the Carver County line in 1998, where a disjointed southern section of State Highway 101 still exists.

County Road 102 is Douglas Drive from State Highway 55 (MN 55) in Golden Valley to West Broadway (County 8) in Crystal.

County Road 103 is West Broadway in Brooklyn Park from Brooklyn Boulevard (County 130 and County 152) to State Highway 610 (MN 610), then Winnetka Avenue North from Highway 610 to West River Road (County 12) in Champlin. County 103 ran concurrent with County 30 from West Broadway to Winnetka Avenue North until the Highway 610 overpass was completed in the late 1990s.

County Road 109 is 85th Avenue North from State Highway 252 (MN 252) in Brooklyn Park to Zachary Lane in Maple Grove, then Weaver Lake Road from Zachary Lane to Interstate 94 in Maple Grove. County 109 extended eastward to West River Road before Highway 252 was realigned from West River Road to its current route in the mid-1980s. Another previous segment of County 109 extended on Weaver Lake Road from County 130 (intersecting near the then-uncompleted Interstate 94) to West Fish Lake Road, then followed West Fish Lake Road to County 10. County 109 between Interstate 94 and Zachary Lane was realigned from a road with many sharp curves in a gravel pit area to its current, straighter route in the early 1990s.

County Road 110 begins at the intersection of County 6 and County 83 in Independence and passes through Minnetrista to Mound, where it shifts from a north–south route to an east–west route back into Minnetrista, ending at County 92 north of St. Bonifacius. Prior to the mid-1950s, this route and County Road 83 were originally State Highway 110.

County Road 112 follows the old route of U.S. 12 through Orono and Long Lake. It starts at County Road 6 in Orono and travels through Long Lake, crossing Brown Road (County 146) and ends at U.S. 12 at the Wayzata city limit.

County Road 115 (non-CSAH) is Hamel Road in Medina from County 19 to County 116. As with County 9, this was also part of the original alignment of State Highway 55 (MN 55) until Highway 55 was realigned north of this route in the 1950s.

County Road 116 begins at Hamel Road (County 115) in Medina, then passes through Corcoran to Territorial Road in the unincorporated town of Fletcher, then follows Territorial Road to the Wright County line at the Crow River, where it becomes Wright County Road 22. The current County 116 bridge over the Crow River replaces an older bridge that was prone to flooding.

County Road 117 (non-CSAH) is 109th Avenue North on the border between Corcoran and Rogers (formerly Hassan Township) from County 116 to County 19. It is going to be extended east as Dayton Parkway to County 81 by the end of 2021 with an interchange added at Interstate 94.

County Road 118 (non-CSAH) is Arrowhead Drive in Medina from County Road 115 to State Highway 55 (MN 55).

County Road 121 is Fernbrook Lane from County 30 in Maple Grove to 129th Avenue North in Dayton, where it shifts from a north–south route to an east–west route and follows 129th Avenue North and French Lake Road into Champlin, where it ends at County 12. A second disjoint segment of County 121 opened in 2007 along Hayden Lake Road in Champlin from U.S. Highway 169 to a park entrance to Elm Creek Park Reserve. These two segments of County 121 will be connected upon opening a bridge over Elm Creek in late 2008, turning back part of French Lake Road to Champlin city maintenance when the bridge opens.

County Road 122 is former State Highway 122 across the Mississippi River on the Washington Avenue Bridge in Minneapolis, and is partly built to freeway standards.

County Road 123 begins at County 10 in Greenfield and ends at County 19 in Hanover near the County 19 bridge and the historic 1885 Hanover Bridge over the Crow River.

County Road 125 is Bartlett Boulevard in Mound from County 110 to Wilshire Boulevard (not to be confused with the Wilshire Boulevard in Los Angeles, CA) then follows Wilshire Boulevard to County 15 in Spring Park.

County Road 130 begins at Brooklyn Boulevard (County 152) in Brooklyn Center and follows 69th Avenue North to County 8, then follows West Broadway back to Brooklyn Boulevard, then follows Brooklyn Boulevard and Elm Creek Boulevard to the intersection of County Road 30 in Maple Grove. Elm Creek Boulevard was completed to County 81 in early 2008, but has yet to be signed as County 130. The original alignment of County 130 was 69th Avenue North from West River Road in Brooklyn Center to the east end of Eagle Lake in Maple Grove, then a road north of Eagle Lake and Cedar Island Lake to County 109, then Berkshire Lane (now Rice Lake Road) between County 109 and County 30. This original route was significantly altered due to the construction of Interstate 94 in the 1960s and the development of Maple Grove in the 1980s-90s, resulting in a period of two disjoint sections of County 130 between the mid-1970s and 2005.

County Road 135 is a road in Orono that begins at County 15 and passes between Maxwell Bay, Stubbs Bay, and the north arm of Crystal Bay on Lake Minnetonka before ending at County 84.

County Road 136 is Silver Lake Road in St. Anthony from New Brighton Boulevard (County 88) to the Ramsey County line, where it continues as Ramsey County Road 44 in New Brighton.

County Road 144 begins at County 12 in Dayton and follows North Diamond Lake Road and 141st Avenue North through Rogers before ending at Territorial Road (County 116) in Rogers (formerly Hassan Township).

County Road 146 is Brown Road South in Orono to Wayzata Boulevard (County 112) in Long Lake.

County Road 150 is Main Street in Rogers from Territorial Road (County 116) to County 81, near the intersection of Interstate 94 and State Highway 101 (MN 101).

County Road 151 is a route in Minnetrista and Orono that starts at County 110 and passes County 19 before traveling south and hits County 19 again, where it ends. It is known as North Arm Drive and West Branch Road.

County Road 152 is the former route of State Highway 152 (MN 152) from County 81 in Brooklyn Park to the intersection of Washington Avenue and Hennepin Avenue in downtown Minneapolis, then follows Washington Avenue to the Seven Corners area of the U of M West Bank, then follows Cedar Avenue from Washington Avenue to the intersection of State Highways 62 (MN 62) and 77 (MN 77). This segment of Cedar Avenue South is a decommissioned segment of State Highway 77 (and earlier State Highway 36 / MN 36 prior to 1982). Interstate 35W was closed north of its interchange with County 152 following the August 1, 2007 bridge collapse, and reopened on September 18, 2008, upon completion of the replacement bridge.

County Road 153 is Lowry Avenue in Minneapolis from West Broadway (County 81) to Silver Lake Road (County 136). The stretch of County 153 between West Broadway and Lyndale Avenue North was previously part of old State Highway 278 until 1982.

County Road 154 was West Medicine Lake Drive between State Highway 55 (MN 55) and Rockford Road (County 9) in Plymouth. The northern part of this route was reconstructed as Northwest Boulevard (currently County 61) during the mid-1980s, while the southern part was turned over to Plymouth city maintenance.

County Road 156 is Winnetka Avenue North between State Highway 55 (MN 55) in Golden Valley to Bass Lake Road (County 10) in New Hope. A previous extension of County 156 extended south of Highway 55 to Wayzata Boulevard (then U.S. 12), decommissioned upon the 1993 completion of Interstate 394.

County Road 157 is a short route partially along the Hennepin County / Wright County line (and just north of Carver County) that connects Hennepin County Road 6 with Wright County Road 17. This includes the segment of road along the county line that is under Hennepin County maintenance / jurisdiction.

County Road 158 runs between State Highway 62 (MN 62) and State Highway 100 (MN 100) in Edina, via Gleason Road and Vernon Avenue. The roadway had carried old U.S. 169 and old U.S. 212 through Edina until 1968. The two routes were then moved to what is now Highway 62.

County Road 159 (non-CSAH) is Territorial Road in Rogers (formerly Hassan Township) from County 101 to County 116.

Park Access Road 201 runs along the eastern side of the Baker Park Reserve beginning at County 6 in Orono, following Homestead Trail, County 24, and Parkview Drive, and ending at County 115 in Medina. Park access road signs are in the shape of a white-on-brown inverse isosceles trapezoid.

Park Access Road 202 begins at County 81 in Maple Grove and follows Zachary Lane into the Elm Creek Park Reserve, then follows Goose Lake Road to Elm Creek Road, then follows Elm Creek Road to County 121 in Dayton. This road's original configuration was Zachary Lane from County 81 (then marked old State Highway 152 / MN 152) to 109th Avenue, then 109th Avenue to old U.S. 52 (later U.S. 169 until the late 1970s). At one time, this configuration was signed as County 202. In the 1990s, the road was reconfigured to Zachary Lane from County 81 to Goose Lake Road, then Goose Lake Road to Hayden Lake Road, then Hayden Lake Road to present day U.S. 169. It was reconfigured to its current route in the mid-2000s. In some spots it is marked with a "county road shield" instead of its regular "park access road shield".

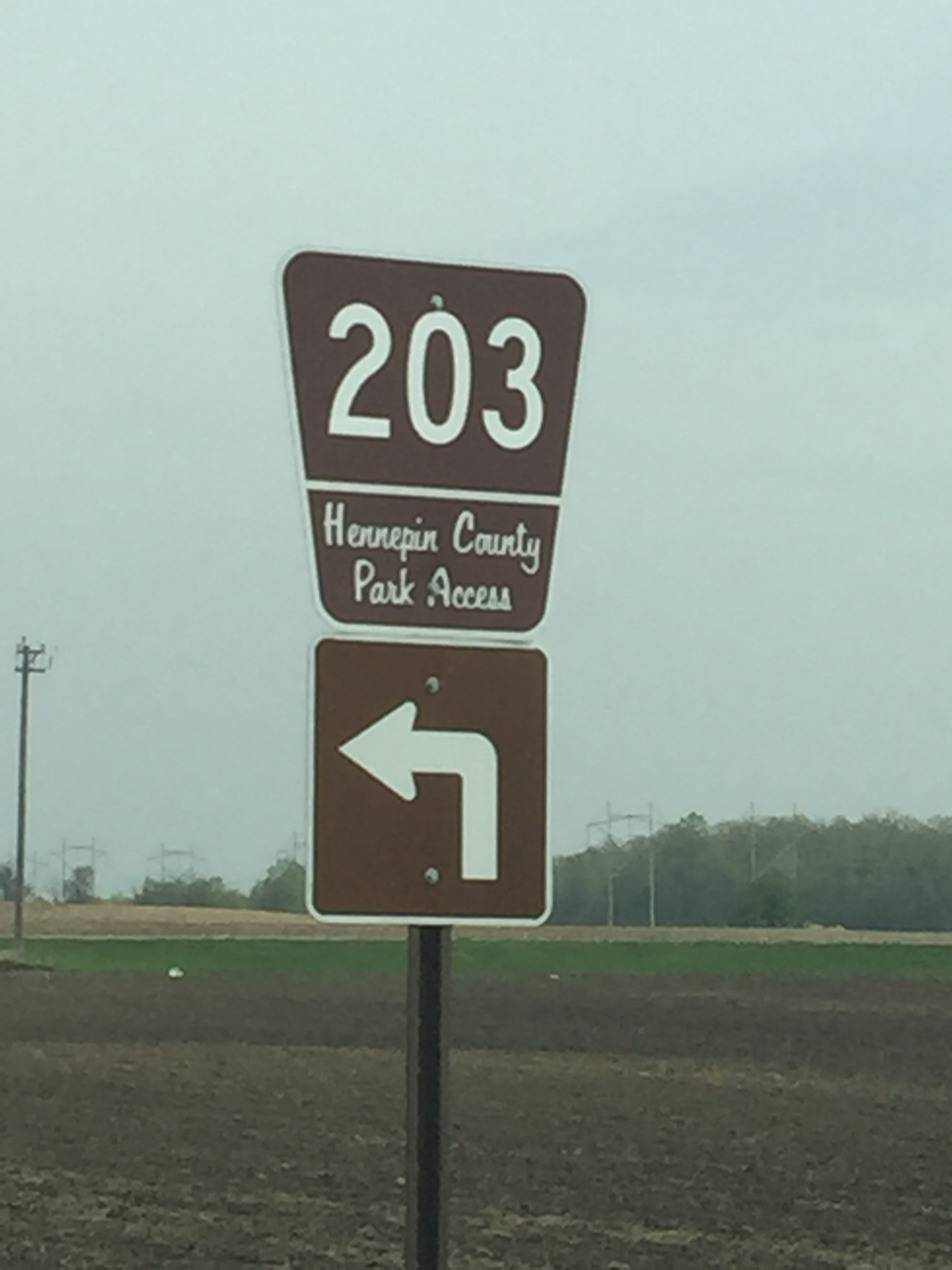
Sign for Park Access Road 203 near Crow-Hassan Park Reserve.

Park Access Road 203 begins at the junction of County 19 and County 117 in Hanover and runs along the east side of the Crow-Hassan Park Reserve to Territorial Road (County 116) in Rogers.

County Road 204 follows Bloomington Road and Minnehaha Avenue from State Highway 55 (MN 55) into the Fort Snelling Golf Course. Bloomington Road beyond Minnehaha Avenue is County Road 205 (non-CSAH).

== Route list ==
Number	Length (mi)	Length (km)	Southern or western terminus	Northern or eastern terminus	Local names	Formed	Removed	Notes
CSAH 1	—	—	Carver County line (County 14)	I-494 in Bloomington	Pioneer Trail; Old Shakopee Road; West 98th Street; East 98th Street; 24th Avenue South	—	—	
CSAH 2	—	—	I-394 in Minneapolis	44th Avenue North (CSAH 152) in Minneapolis	Penn Avenue	—	—	
CSAH 3	—	—	CSAH 101 in Minnetonka	Ramsey County line (County 35)	Excelsior Boulevard, Lake Street	—	—	One-way couplet with Lagoon Avenue (CSAH 43) from Dupont to Knox Aves in Minneapolis
CSAH 4	—	—	Flying Cloud Drive (CSAH 61) in Eden Prairie	Excelsior Boulevard (CSAH 3) in Minnetonka	Spring Road; Eden Prairie Road	—	—	
CSAH 5	—	—	CSAH 101 in Minnetonka	CSAH 25 (Old MN 7) in St. Louis Park	Minnetonka Boulevard	—	—	Western Segment
CSAH 5	—	—	Lyndale Avenue (CSAH 22) in Minneapolis	University Avenue (CSAH 36) in Minneapolis	Franklin Avenue; Southeast 27th Avenue	—	—	Eastern Segment
CSAH 6	—	—	Carver County line (County 20)	MN 55 in Plymouth	Watertown Road; 6th Avenue North	—	—	
CSAH 8	—	—	42nd Avenue North (CSAH 9) in Robbinsdale	Lakeland Avenue North (CSAH 130) in Brooklyn Park	West Broadway Avenue	—	—	
CSAH 9	—	—	MN 55 in Plymouth	Osseo Road (CSAH 152) in Minneapolis	Rockford Road; 42nd Avenue North; Lake Drive; 45th Avenue North	—	—	
CSAH 10	—	—	Rebecca Park Trail (CSAH 50) in Rockford	MN 100 in Brooklyn Center	Woodland Trail; Bass Lake Road	—	—	
CSAH 11	—	—	Wright County line (County 30)	CSAH 19 in Loretto		—	—	
CSAH 12	—	—	85th Avenue North (CSAH 109) in Brooklyn Park	Wright County line (County 42)	Noble Parkway; West River Road; East Hayden Lake Road; Dayton River Road	—	—	
CSAH 13	—	—	CSAH 81 in Rogers	Dayton River Road (CSAH 12) in Dayton	Brockton Lane North	—	—	
CSAH 14	—	—	Brooklyn Boulevard (CSAH 152) in Brooklyn Park	West River Road (CSAH 12) in Champlin	Zane Avenue North; Douglas Drive North	—	—	
CSAH 15	—	—	Carver County line (County 24)	U.S. 12 in Wayzata	Lynwood Boulevard; Shoreline Drive	—	—	Western Segment; formerly one continuous route
CSAH 15	—	—	CSAH 101 in Wayzata	Vicksburg Lane North in Plymouth	Gleason Lake Road	—	—	Eastern Segment; originally continued to MN 55 via modern-day Sunset Trail
CSAH 16	—	—	CSAH 101 in Wayzata	Minnetonka Boulevard (CSAH 5) in Minnetonka	McGinty Road	—	—	Originally continued into downtown Wayzata and along Cedar Lake Road into Minneapolis
CSAH 17	—	—	Old Shakopee Road (CSAH 1) in Bloomington	Excelsior Boulevard (CSAH 3) on the Minneapolis/St. Louis Park city limit	France Avenue South	—	—	
CSAH 17	—	—	Minnetonka Boulevard (CSAH 5) in Minneapolis	Cedar Lake Road in Minneapolis	France Avenue South	—	—	Northern Segment
CSAH 19	—	—	MN 7 in Excelsior	Wright County line (County 19)	Oak Street (Excelsior); Smithtown Road (Shorewood); Manitou Road (Tonka Bay); Shadywood Road, North Shore Drive (Orono); Budd Avenue, Main Street, Baker Park Road (Maple Plain); Medina Street (Loretto); 109th Avenue North (Hanover)	—	—	
CSAH 20	—	—	Excelsior Boulevard (CSAH 3) in Hopkins	MN 7 in St. Louis Park	Blake Road	—	—	
CSAH 20	—	—	France Avenue (CSAH 17) in Minneapolis	Franklin Avenue (CSAH 5) in Minneapolis	West 44th Street; Sheridan Avenue South; Bde Maka Ska Parkway; West 36th Street; Hennepin Avenue	—	—	Eastern Segment
CSAH 21	—	—	France Avenue (CSAH 17) in Minneapolis	Lyndale Avenue (CSAH 22) in Minneapolis	West 50th Street	—	—	Old MN 121
CSAH 22	—	—	MN 121 and West 58th Street in Minneapolis	Franklin Avenue (CSAH 5) in Minneapolis	Lyndale Avenue	—	—	
CSAH 23	—	—	Hennepin Avenue (CSAH 52) in Minneapolis	Anoka County line (County 1)	Northeast Main Street; Northeast Marshall Street; East River Road	—	—	
CSAH 24	—	—	CSAH 19 in Medina	Rockford Road (CSAH 9) and MN 55 in Plymouth		—	—	
CSAH 25	—	—	MN 7 and MN 100 in St. Louis Park	Excelsior Boulevard (CSAH 3) in Minneapolis	Lake Street	—	—	Old MN 7
CR 26	—	—	Carver CSAH 20 in Watertown Township	CSAH 110 in Minnetrista		—	—	
CSAH 27	—	—	Hennepin Avenue (CSAH 52) in Minneapolis	New Brighton Boulevard (CSAH 88) in Minneapolis	Stinson Boulevard	—	—	Southern Segment
CSAH 27	—	—	St. Anthony Boulevard on the Minneapolis/St. Anthony city limit	Anoka and Ramsey county lines	Stinson Boulevard	—	—	Northern Segment
CSAH 28	—	—	Old Shakopee Road (CSAH 1) in Bloomington	West 78th Street in Bloomington	Bush Lake Road; East Bush Lake Road	—	—	
CSAH 29	—	—	U.S. 12 in Maple Plain	CSAH 19 in Maple Plain	Baker Park Road	—	—	
CSAH 30	—	—	CSAH 19 in Corcoran	Zane Avenue North (CSAH 14) in Brooklyn Park	97th Avenue North; 93rd Avenue North	—	—	
CSAH 31	—	—	American Boulevard West in Bloomington	West 50th Street (CSAH 21) in Minneapolis	Xerxes Avenue South, York Avenue South	—	—	
CSAH 32	—	—	Old Shakopee Road (CSAH 1) in Bloomington	MN 62 in Richfield	Penn Avenue South	—	—	
CSAH 33	—	—	East 46th Street (CSAH 46) in Minneapolis	Washington Avenue (CSAH 152) in Minneapolis	Park Avenue South	—	—	One-way northbound
CSAH 34	—	—	Old Shakopee Road (CSAH 1) in Bloomington	MN 100 and I-494 in Bloomington	Normandale Boulevard	—	—	Formerly extended past CSAH 1 to the Dan Patch Line bridge
CSAH 35	—	—	Old Shakopee Road (CSAH 1) in Bloomington	Washington Avenue (CSAH 152) in Minneapolis	Portland Avenue South	—	—	One-way southbound from Washington Ave to 46th St
CSAH 36	—	—	I-35W in Minneapolis	Ramsey County line (County 34)	University Avenue Southeast	—	—	One-way eastbound from 35W to Oak St
CSAH 37	—	—	I-35W in Minneapolis	University Avenue Southeast in Minneapolis	Southeast 4th Street; Southeast Oak Street	—	—	One-way westbound
CSAH 38	—	—	Hennepin Avenue (Former CSAH 20) in Minneapolis	MN 55 in Minneapolis	West 36th Street; Lyndale Avenue South; West 38th Street; East 38th Street	—	—	
CSAH 39	—	—	Mitchell Road/Baker Road (CSAH 60) in Eden Prairie	U.S. 212 in Eden Prairie	Valley View Road	—	—	Originally traveled to U.S. 169
CSAH 40	—	—	MN 55 in Golden Valley	North 7th Street in Minneapolis	Glenwood Avenue	—	—	One-way couplet with Twins Way in downtown Minneapolis
CSAH 42	—	—	Cedar Avenue South (CSAH 152) in Minneapolis	Minnehaha Avenue (CSAH 48) in Minneapolis	East 42nd Street	—	—	
CSAH 43	—	—	Bde Maka Ska Drive in Minneapolis	Lake Street (CSAH 3) in Minneapolis	Lagoon Avenue	—	—	One-way westbound
CSAH 44	—	—	MN 7 in Minnetrista	Bartlett Boulevard (CSAH 110) in Mound		—	—	
CSAH 46	—	—	Lyndale Avenue (CSAH 22) in Minneapolis	Cedar Avenue South (CSAH 152) in Minneapolis	West 46th Street; East 46th Street	—	—	Western Segment
CSAH 46	—	—	MN 55 (Hiawatha Avenue) in Minneapolis	Ramsey County line (County 42)	East 46th Street	—	—	Eastern Segment
CR 47	—	—	CSAH 101 in Plymouth	Northwest Boulevard (CSAH 61) in Plymouth		—	—	
CSAH 48	—	—	East 46th Street (CSAH 46) in Minneapolis	Franklin Avenue (CSAH 5) in Minneapolis	Minnehaha Avenue, 26th Avenue South	—	—	
CSAH 49	—	—	Territorial Road (CSAH 116) in the former Hassan Township	Main Street (CSAH 150) in Rogers	129th Avenue North	—	2006	Western Segment
CSAH 49	—	—	MN 101 in Rogers	Dayton River Road (CSAH 12) in Champlin	South Diamond Lake Road	—	2006	Eastern Segment
CSAH 50	—	—	Wright County line (County 17)	CSAH 10 in Corcoran	Rebecca Park Trail	—	—	
CSAH 51	—	—	Shoreline Drive (CSAH 15) in Orono	Shoreline Drive (CSAH 15) in Orono	Sunset Drive, Shadywood Road, North Shore Drive	—	—	
CSAH 52	—	—	98th Street (CSAH 1) in Bloomington	61st Street in Minneapolis	Nicollet Avenue South	—	—	Southern Segment
CSAH 52	—	—	Washington Avenue (CSAH 152) in Minneapolis	Ramsey County line (County 30)	Hennepin Avenue	—	—	Northern Segment
CSAH 53	—	—	France Avenue South (CSAH 17) in Edina	MN 77 in Richfield	West 66th Street, East 66th Street	—	—	
CSAH 54	—	—	MN 62 in Minneapolis	MN 55 in Minneapolis	28th Avenue South	—	—	
CSAH 55	—	—	Bloomington Ferry Road (Former CSAH 18) in Bloomington	Normandale Boulevard (Former CSAH 34) in Bloomington	Auto Club Road	—	1996	
CSAH 57	—	—	44th Avenue North (CSAH 152) in Minneapolis	MN 100 and CSAH 10 in Brooklyn Center	Humboldt Avenue North, 57th Avenue North	—	—	Formerly traveled down Fremont Avenue to West Broadway (CSAH 81)
CSAH 58	—	—	West Broadway Avenue (CSAH 66 & 81) in Minneapolis	33rd Avenue North in Minneapolis	Emerson Avenue North	—	—	One-way couplet with Fremont Ave N for its entire route
CSAH 60	—	—	MN 5 and U.S. 212 in Eden Prairie	Minnetonka Boulevard (CSAH 5) in Minnetonka	Mitchell Road, Baker Road	—	—	
CSAH 61	—	—	Carver County line (County 61)	MN 610 in Maple Grove	Flying Cloud Drive, Shady Oak Road (Eden Prairie); Plymouth Road (Minnetonka); Xenium Lane North, Northwest Boulevard (Plymouth); Hemlock Lane North, Zachary Lane North (Maple Grove)	—	—	Flying Cloud Drive section formerly U.S. 212; Zachary Lane section formerly CR 202
CSAH 62	—	—	CSAH 101 on the Eden Prairie/Minnetonka city limit	I-494 and MN 62 on the Eden Prairie/Minnetonka city limit	Townline Road, West 62nd Street	—	—	Formerly designated as County 67; renumbered as County 62 when MN 62 became a state highway
CSAH 66	—	—	Douglas Drive North (CSAH 102) in Golden Valley	Stinson Boulevard (CSAH 27) in Minneapolis	Duluth Street, Golden Valley Road, Girard Avenue North, West Broadway Avenue, Broadway Street Northeast	—	—	
CSAH 68	—	—	Excelsior Boulevard (CSAH 3) in Hopkins	Old CSAH 18 in Hopkins	Mainstreet	—	—	
CSAH 70	—	—	U.S. 169 on the Golden Valley/New Hope city limit	Douglas Drive North (CSAH 102) on the Golden Valley/Crystal city limit	Medicine Lake Road	—	—	
CSAH 73	—	—	MN 7 in Hopkins	MN 55 in Plymouth	Hopkins Crossroad, Zachary Lane North, Sunset Trail	—	—	
CSAH 81	—	—	Washington Avenue North (CSAH 152) in Minneapolis	I-94 and MN 101 in Rogers	West Broadway Avenue, Bottineau Boulevard	—	—	
CSAH 82	—	—	Carver County line (County 17)	Second Street in Excelsior	Mill Street	—	—	
CSAH 83	—	—	CSAH 110 and Watertown Road (CSAH 6) in Independence	U.S. Route 12 in Maple Plain	Halgren Road	—	—	
CSAH 84	—	—	CSAH 19 in Orono	North Shore Drive (CSAH 51) in Orono	Bayside Road, Leaf Street, Fox Street	—	—	
CSAH 88	—	—	Broadway Street Northeast (CSAH 66) in Minneapolis	Ramsey County line (County 88)	New Brighton Boulevard	—	—	Old U.S. 8
CSAH 90	—	—	Watertown Road (CSAH 6) in Independence	CSAH 11 in Independence		—	—	
CSAH 92	—	—	Carver County line (County 92)	Rebecca Park Trail (CSAH 50) in Rockford	Main Street (St. Bonifacius); Watertown Road, Lake Sarah Road, Dogwood Street	—	—	
CSAH 93	—	—	Silver Lake Road (CSAH 136) in St. Anthony	Ramsey County line (County 23)	37th Avenue Northeast	—	—	
CSAH 94	—	—	New Brighton Boulevard (CSAH 88) in St. Anthony	Ramsey County line (County 19)	29th Avenue Northeast	—	—	
CSAH 101	—	—	Carver County line (MN 101)	CSAH 81 and CSAH 13 on the Dayton/Rogers city limit	Bushaway Road, Wayzata Boulevard, Central Avenue North (Wayzata); Brockton Lane North, Troy Lane North (Maple Grove)	—	—	Old MN 101
CSAH 102	—	—	MN 55 in Golden Valley	West Broadway Avenue (CSAH 8) in Crystal	Douglas Drive North	—	—	
CSAH 103	—	—	Brooklyn Boulevard (CSAH 152 & 130) in Brooklyn Park	West River Road (CSAH 12) in Champlin	West Broadway Avenue, Winnetka Avenue North	—	—	Section in Champlin non-CSAH
CSAH 109	—	—	I-94 in Maple Grove	MN 252 in Brooklyn Park	Weaver Lake Road, 85th Avenue North	—	—	
CSAH 110	—	—	CSAH 92 in Minnetrista	CSAH 6 and CSAH 83 in Independence	Bartlett Boulevard, Commerce Boulevard	—	—	Formerly original State Highway 110 before it was turned back in the 1950s.
CSAH 112	—	—	CSAH 6 in Orono	U.S. 12 in Wayzata	Wayzata Boulevard	—	—	
CSAH 115	—	—	CSAH 19 in Medina	MN 55 and CR 116 in Medina	Hamel Road, Pinto Drive	—	—	
CR 116	—	—	MN 55 and CSAH 115 in Medina	Wright County line (County 22)	Pinto Drive, Fletcher Lane, Territorial Road	—	—	CSAH northwest of CSAH 150
CR 117	—	—	CSAH 19 and CR 203 in Hanover	Fletcher Lane (CR 116) on the Corcoran/Rogers city limit	109th Avenue North	—	—	
CR 118	—	—	Hamel Road (CSAH 115) in Medina	MN 55 in Medina	Arrowhead Drive	—	—	
CSAH 121	—	—	CSAH 30 in Maple Grove	U.S. 169 and CSAH 12 in Champlin	Maple Grove Parkway, Fernbrook Lane North, 129th Avenue North, French Lake Road, West Hayden Lake Road, East Hayden Lake Road	—	—	
CSAH 122	—	—	I-35W in Minneapolis	Pleasant Street Southeast in Minneapolis	Washington Avenue	1996	current	Old MN 122
CSAH 123	—	—	CSAH 10 in Greenfield	109th Avenue North (CSAH 19) in Hanover	Pioneer Trail	—	—	
CSAH 125	—	—	Commerce Boulevard (CSAH 110) in Mound	Shoreline Drive (CSAH 15) in Spring Park	Bartlett Boulevard, Wilshire Boulevard	—	—	
CSAH 130	—	—	CSAH 81 in Maple Grove	Brooklyn Boulevard (CSAH 152) in Brooklyn Center	Elm Creek Boulevard, Brooklyn Boulevard, West Broadway Avenue, Lakeland Avenue North, 69th Avenue North	—	—	
CSAH 135	—	—	North Shore Drive (CSAH 51) in Orono	Bayside Road (CSAH 84) in Orono	Tonkawa Road	—	—	
CSAH 136	—	—	Kenzie Terrace (CSAH 153) in St. Anthony	Ramsey County line (County 44)	Silver Lake Road	—	—	
CSAH 144	—	—	Territorial Road (CSAH 116) in Rogers	Dayton River Road (CSAH 12) in Dayton	141st Avenue North (Rogers), North Diamond Lake Road (Dayton)	—	—	
CSAH 146	—	—	North Shore Drive (CSAH 51) in Orono	Wayzata Boulevard (CSAH 112) in Long Lake	Brown Road South, Brown Road North	—	—	
CSAH 150	—	—	Territorial Road (CSAH 116) in Rogers	CSAH 81 in Rogers	Main Street	—	—	
CSAH 151	—	—	CSAH 110 in Minnetrista	North Shore Drive (CSAH 19) in Orono	West Branch Road, North Arm Drive	—	—	
CSAH 152	—	—	MN 77 in Minneapolis	CSAH 81 in Brooklyn Park	Cedar Avenue South, Washington Avenue South, Washington Avenue North, Lyndale Avenue North, Webber Parkway, 44th Avenue North, Osseo Road, Brooklyn Boulevard	—	—	Brooklyn Boulevard into Minneapolis originally MN 152; Cedar Avenue section originally MN 36
CSAH 153	—	—	West Broadway (CSAH 81) in Minneapolis	Silver Lake Road (CSAH 136) in St. Anthony	Lowry Avenue; Kenzie Terrace	—	—	Old MN 278 between CSAH 81 and CSAH 152
CSAH 156	—	—	MN 55 in Golden Valley	Bass Lake Road (CSAH 10) in New Hope	Winnetka Avenue North	—	—	
CSAH 157	—	—	Watertown Road (CSAH 6) in Independence	Wright County line (County 17)		—	—	
CSAH 158	—	—	MN 62 in Edina	MN 100 in Edina	Gleason Road; Vernon Avenue South	—	—	Old U.S. 212
CR 159	—	—	Fletcher Lane (CR 116) in Rogers	Brockton Lane (CSAH 101) in Rogers	Territorial Road	—	—	
CR 202	—	—	Fernbrook Lane North (CSAH 121) in Dayton	Zachary Lane North in Dayton	Elm Creek Road	—	—	Park Access Road
CSAH 204	—	—	Taylor Avenue in Fort Snelling	MN 55/MN 62 in Fort Snelling	Colville Avenue; Bloomington Road	—	—	
Former

== See also ==
- County roads in Minnesota
- County Road 122 (Hennepin County, Minnesota)
- County Road 81 (Hennepin County, Minnesota)
- County Road 61 (Hennepin County, Minnesota)
