= List of highways numbered 81 =

Route 81 or Highway 81 may refer to:

== International ==
- AH81 Asian Highway 81
- E81 European route E81

== Australia ==
- Escort Way (New South Wales)
- Mulligan Highway and Peninsula Developmental Road – Queensland State Route 81
- (Victoria)

== Canada ==
- Newfoundland and Labrador Route 81

== Greece ==
- EO81 road

== India ==
- National Highway 81 (India)

== Korea, South ==
- National Route 81

== Mexico ==
- Mexican Federal Highway 81

== Philippines ==
- N81 highway (Philippines)

== United States ==
- Interstate 81
  - Interstate 81E (former)
  - Interstate 81S (former)
- U.S. Route 81
- Alabama State Route 81
  - County Route 81 (Lee County, Alabama)
- Arizona State Route 81 (former)
- Arkansas Highway 81
- California State Route 81
- Connecticut Route 81
- Florida State Road 81
  - County Road 81A (Holmes County, Florida)
- Georgia State Route 81
- Idaho State Highway 81
- Illinois Route 81
- Iowa Highway 81
- Kentucky Route 81
- Louisiana Highway 81
  - Louisiana State Route 81 (former)
- Maryland Route 81 (former)
- Massachusetts Route 81
- M-81 (Michigan highway)
- Minnesota:
  - Minnesota State Highway 81 (1934)
  - Minnesota State Highway 81 (pre-1988)
- Missouri Route 81
- Montana Highway 81
- Nebraska Highway 81 (former)
- Nevada State Route 81 (former)
- New Jersey Route 81
  - County Route 81 (Bergen County, New Jersey)
- New Mexico State Road 81
- New York State Route 81
  - County Route 81A (Cayuga County, New York)
    - County Route 81C (Cayuga County, New York)
  - County Route 81 (Chautauqua County, New York)
  - County Route 81 (Dutchess County, New York)
  - County Route 81 (Essex County, New York)
  - County Route 81 (Madison County, New York)
  - County Route 81 (Montgomery County, New York)
  - County Route 81 (Oneida County, New York)
  - County Route 81 (Rockland County, New York)
  - County Route 81 (Suffolk County, New York)
  - County Route 81 (Sullivan County, New York)
- North Carolina Highway 81
- Country Road 81 (Richland County, North Dakota)
- Ohio State Route 81
- Oklahoma State Highway 81A
- Pennsylvania Route 81 (former)
- Rhode Island Route 81
- South Carolina Highway 81
- South Dakota Highway 81 (former)
- Tennessee State Route 81
  - Tennessee State Route 81A (former)
- Texas State Highway 81
  - Texas State Highway Loop 81 (former)
  - Farm to Market Road 81
- Utah State Route 81
- Virginia State Route 81 (former)
- West Virginia Route 81 (1925–1941) (former)
  - West Virginia Route 81 (1960–1961) (former)
- Wisconsin Highway 81

Territories

- U.S. Virgin Islands Highway 81

== See also ==
- A81

Preceded by 80	Lists of highways 81	Succeeded by 82
