= VA 81 =

VA-81 or VA 81 may refer to:

- VFA-81, an aviation unit of the United States Navy
- Virginia State Route 81 (disambiguation)
