= Hafften Lake =

Lake in the state of Minnesota, United States

- Location within Minnesota Location within the United States
- Location: Greenfield, Minnesota
- Coordinates: 45°5′41″N 93°40′43″W
- Type: Lake
- Basin countries: United States
- Surface elevation: 1,004 ft (306 m)

Hafften Lake is a lake in Hennepin County, in the U.S. state of Minnesota.

Hafften Lake was named for a German settler.

== See also ==
- List of lakes in Minnesota
