= County Road 122 (Hennepin County, Minnesota) =

Highway in Minneapolis, Minnesota, US

County Road 122
- CR 122 highlighted in red

Route information
- Maintained by Hennepin County Transportation Department
- Length: 0.69 mi (1,110 m)
- Existed: November 1996–present

Major junctions
- West end: I-35W in Minneapolis
- East end: CSAH 36 (University Avenue) in Minneapolis

Location
- Country: United States
- State: Minnesota
- County: Hennepin

Highway system
- County roads of Minnesota; Hennepin County

Hennepin County Road 122 (CR 122) or County State-Aid Highway 122 (CSAH 122) is an unsigned county state-aid highway within the city of Minneapolis, Hennepin County, Minnesota, United States, crossing the Mississippi River on the Washington Avenue Bridge.

== Route description ==
County 122 connects the East Bank and West Bank of the University of Minnesota, Minneapolis campus. On the East Bank, CR 122 follows Washington Avenue and is the primary route through the Stadium Village district of the University. On the West Bank, CR 122 follows a short freeway, with exits to Cedar Avenue and Interstate 35W (I-35W), that feeds into 3rd Street and 4th Street in downtown Minneapolis. Between them is the double-decker Washington Avenue Bridge that carries vehicular traffic on the lower level and bicycle and pedestrian traffic on the top level.

The route stretches from I-35W eastbound to University Avenue (CR 36); the continuation west of I-35W into 3rd and 4th Streets (which cross downtown to I-94 at exit number 230) is a city street. Since parts of old CR 18 (now US 169) and old CR 62 (now MN 62) were transferred to state maintenance in 1988, CR 122 was the only freeway maintained by Hennepin County, until changes mandated by the construction of the light rail Green Line converted it to an urban expressway, with the interchange at Cedar Avenue converted to a signalized intersection along with the former westbound on-ramp now handling two-way traffic.

== History ==
Trunk Highway 122
- Location: Minneapolis – St. Paul
- Existed: July 1981–November 1996

In 1933, the Minnesota State Legislature added the corridor formed by Washington and University Avenues to the state highway system as part of Legislative Route 104:

Beginning at the present terminus of Minnesota Constitutional Route 3 on the easterly limits of the city of St. Paul, thence extending in a northwesterly direction through the cities of St. Paul and Minneapolis to the present point of beginning of Constitutional Route 3 on the westerly limits of the city of Minneapolis.

By the time the Minnesota Department of Highways had laid out the numbering in 1934, this corridor served the following former route numbers: US 12, US 52, US 218 (later MN 218), and MN 56. MN 56 remained on University Avenue on the east side of the Mississippi River, but the three other routes all crossed the Washington Avenue Bridge into downtown Minneapolis. US 12 turned off Washington Avenue to the west on Hennepin Avenue, and US 52 and US 218 left at Broadway Avenue (now CR 81). US 218 (later Minnesota Highway 218) was later eliminated, and MN 56 north of Washington Avenue became MN 47 in 1963, but otherwise the routes remained the same - even exiting the new freeway to remain on Washington Avenue - until 1981.

In July 1981, US 12 was rerouted onto I-94 between downtown Minneapolis and downtown St. Paul, while the route of US 52 was changed to use the Third Avenue Bridge, replacing the southernmost piece of MN 47 on University Avenue, and using 3rd and 4th Streets to I-94 at exit number 230. Washington Avenue through downtown Minneapolis was removed from the state highway system, and the bridge and approaches were assigned state trunk highway number 122 (Highway 122) - and a new legislative route number (Route 385). The definition of Legislative Route 385 was repealed in 1996, and in November 1996, MN 122 was transferred to Hennepin County maintenance.

When the Green Line light rail was constructed through the University's Stadium Village, it was decided that the stretch of Washington Avenue between East River Road and Walnut Street remain open only to mass transit and taxi traffic. For this reason, all other traffic heading east must exit at East River Road and utilize that road to continue eastbound.

== Exit list ==
The entire route is in Minneapolis, Hennepin County.

mi	km	Destinations	Notes
0.000	0.000	I-35W south / MN 55 east (Hiawatha Avenue)	I-94 west can be accessed via I-35W
		I-35W north	eastbound exit: signalized left turn across westbound traffic
		To I-35W north / Cedar Avenue (CR 152)	signalized exit ramp, eastbound traffic turns left across westbound traffic. Westbound traffic utilizes its own offramp.
		Washington Avenue Bridge	
		East River Parkway	Eastbound exit and westbound entrance - general traffic must exit as C-122 is accessible only to buses and taxis from here to the intersection with Walnut St.
		Walnut Street	
0.69	1.11	CSAH 36 (University Avenue)	Eastern terminus; unsignalized
1.000 mi = 1.609 km; 1.000 km = 0.621 mi: Incomplete access
