= Loretto, Minnesota =

City in Minnesota, United States

- City
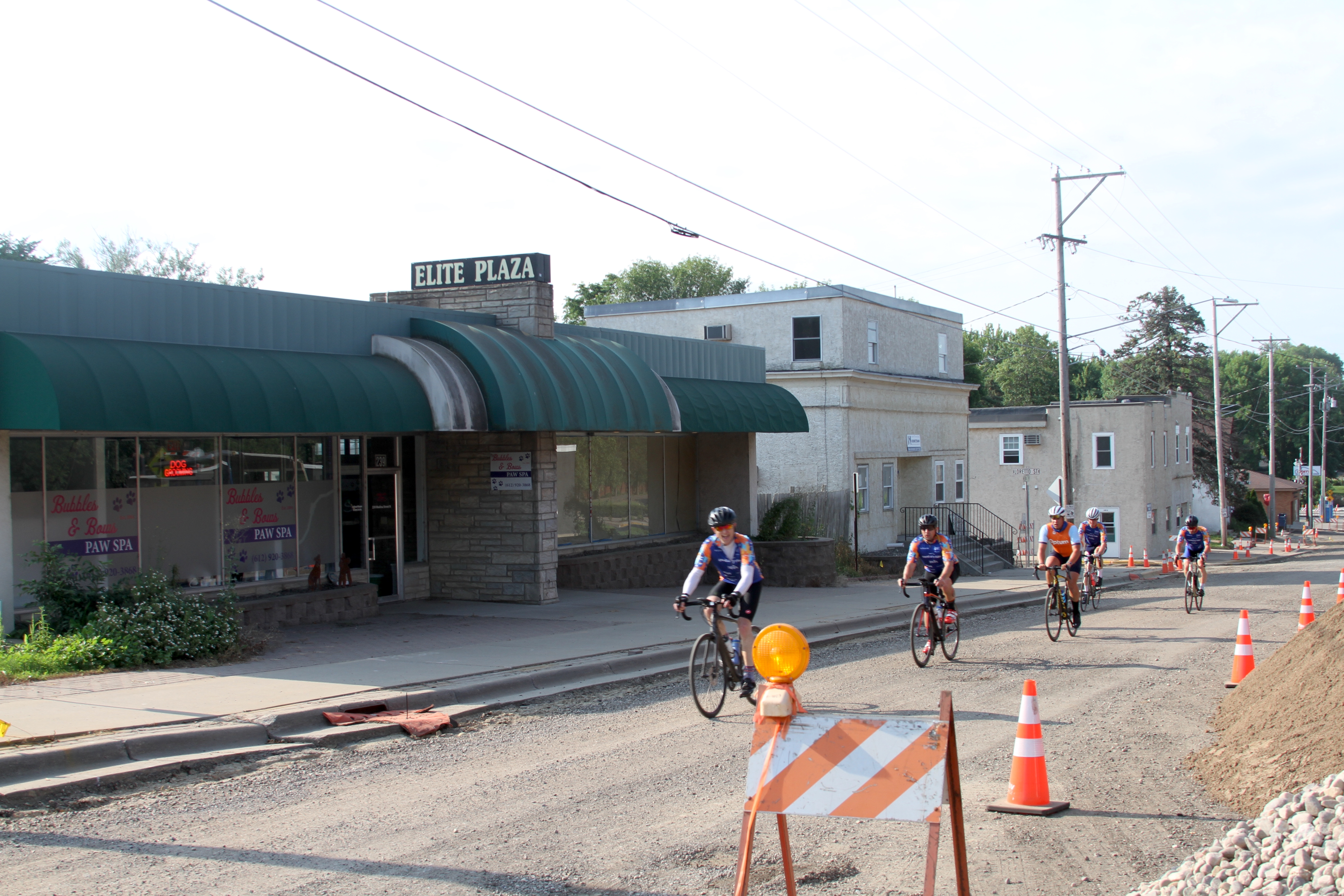
- Cyclists going down Lake Independence Regional Trail/Hwy 19

- Logo
- Motto: A Place to Call Home
- Location of Loretto within Hennepin County, Minnesota
- Coordinates: 45°3′14″N 93°38′4″W
- Country: United States
- State: Minnesota
- County: Hennepin
- Founded: 1886
- Incorporated: 1940

Government
  - Mayor: Kent Koch

Area
  - City: 0.26 sq mi (0.67 km^{2})
  - Land: 0.26 sq mi (0.67 km^{2})
  - Water: 0 sq mi (0.00 km^{2})
- Elevation: 1,014 ft (309 m)

Population (2020)
  - City: 646
  - Density: 2,502.7/sq mi (966.28/km^{2})
  - Metro: 3,279,833
- Time zone: UTC-6 (Central)
  - Summer (DST): UTC-5 (Central)
- ZIP code: 55357
- Area code: 763
- FIPS code: 27-38222
- GNIS feature ID: 0647188
- Website: https://lorettomn.gov/

Loretto is a city in Hennepin County, Minnesota, United States. The population was 646 at the 2020 census. An outer suburb of Minneapolis located 19 miles (31 km) to the west, Loretto is completely surrounded by a rural, agricultural part of Medina, Minnesota.

== Geography ==
According to the United States Census Bureau, the city has an area of 0.29 square miles (0.75 km^{2}), all land. County Roads 11 and 19 are two of the main routes. Nearby places include Medina, Maple Plain, Independence, Greenfield, and Corcoran.

== History ==
Loretto was founded in 1886, and settled by German and Dutch immigrants. Its name comes from two sources: the Jesuit mission, Notre-Dame de la Jeune Lorette, on the east bank of the Saint Charles River, about eight miles northwest of Quebec City in Canada, known as Lorette, which served as a refuge for Huron Indian refugees, and the village of Loretto, Kentucky, where the Sisters of Loretto at the Foot of the Cross were founded in 1812. The name's original inspiration stems from Loreto, a small town in Italy celebrated for its pilgrimage shrine.

The city was incorporated in 1940. The first mayor was Albert Van Beusekom.

In 2010, Loretto elected Kent Koch as its mayor. Koch was the starting second baseman on the St. Cloud State University baseball team, and was believed to be the only college student in the country who was also a mayor.

== Demographics ==
Historical population
Census	Pop.	Note	%±
1950	179		—
1960	271		51.4%
1970	340		25.5%
1980	297		−12.6%
1990	404		36.0%
2000	570		41.1%
2010	650		14.0%
2020	646		−0.6%
U.S. Decennial Census

=== 2010 census ===
As of the census of 2010, there were 650 people, 269 households, and 168 families living in the city. The population density was 2,241.4 inhabitants per square mile (865.4/km^{2}). There were 278 housing units at an average density of 958.6 per square mile (370.1/km^{2}). The racial makeup of the city was 98.6% White, 0.3% African American, 0.3% from other races, and 0.8% from two or more races. Hispanic or Latino of any race were 1.2% of the population.

There were 269 households, of which 34.6% had children under the age of 18 living with them, 53.2% were married couples living together, 7.8% had a female householder with no husband present, 1.5% had a male householder with no wife present, and 37.5% were non-families. 30.9% of all households were made up of individuals, and 11.6% had someone living alone who was 65 years of age or older. The average household size was 2.42 and the average family size was 3.10.

The median age in the city was 39.9 years. 24.6% of residents were under the age of 18; 7.4% were between the ages of 18 and 24; 25.5% were from 25 to 44; 30.2% were from 45 to 64; and 12.2% were 65 years of age or older. The gender makeup of the city was 50.3% male and 49.7% female.

=== 2000 census ===
As of the census of 2000, there were 570 people, 225 households, and 146 families living in the city. The population density was 1,948.7 inhabitants per square mile (752.4/km^{2}). There were 228 housing units at an average density of 779.5 per square mile (301.0/km^{2}). The racial makeup of the city was 98.95% White, 0.53% Native American, and 0.53% from two or more races. Hispanic or Latino of any race were 0.18% of the population. 56.7% were of German, 7.6% Irish and 6.2% Norwegian ancestry according to Census 2000.

There were 225 households, out of which 38.7% had children under the age of 18 living with them, 60.4% were married couples living together, 4.9% had a female householder with no husband present, and 34.7% were non-families. 27.6% of all households were made up of individuals, and 9.3% had someone living alone who was 65 years of age or older. The average household size was 2.53 and the average family size was 3.22.

In the city, the population was spread out, with 29.3% under the age of 18, 7.5% from 18 to 24, 33.7% from 25 to 44, 18.8% from 45 to 64, and 10.7% who were 65 years of age or older. The median age was 35 years. For every 100 females, there were 107.3 males. For every 100 females age 18 and over, there were 102.5 males.

The median income for a household in the city was $54,375, and the median income for a family was $71,944. Males had a median income of $50,208 versus $32,321 for females. The per capita income for the city was $27,443. About 0.7% of families and 1.6% of the population were below the poverty line, including none of those under age 18 and 8.2% of those age 65 or over.

== Education ==
It is in the Delano Public School District.
