= Orono School District =

School district in Minnesota

Coordinates: 44°59′27″N 93°35′44″W

The Orono School District (ISD #278) is a Minnesota public school district located in the west-metro area of Minneapolis, Minnesota, United States. The school district, organized in 1949, serves part or all of the following areas: Independence, Long Lake, Maple Plain, Medina, Minnetonka Beach, Orono, and Wayzata. The district superintendent is Dr. Kristine Flesher.

== Overview ==
Located in Long Lake, Minnesota, United States, the district serves grades pre-kindergarten to twelfth grade, in five different school buildings.

The school district had a student population of 2,850 and 206 teachers during the 2005–2006 school year.

The schools are located on a 120-acre (0.49 km^{2}) campus along Old Crystal Bay Road.

The district mascot is the Orono Spartan and the school colors are navy blue, red, and white.

The average number of instructional days in the district is 167 days. The district calendar includes of "no school" days for the Minnesota Education Association (MEA), Thanksgiving Break, Winter Break, Martin Luther King Jr. Day, Summer Break, President's Day, Spring Break, Good Friday, Memorial Day, and other professional days.

The district campus consists of six main institutional buildings: Orono High School, Orono Middle School, Orono Activities Center, Orono Intermediate School and Schumann Elementary School. Other district facilities consist of a childcare facility, a swimming pool, the Orono Ice Arena, a stadium, tennis courts, many outdoor fields, and an Activities Center which includes indoor basketball and tennis courts as well as weight and cardio facilities. The Orono Discovery Center is located in Maple Plain, but is still considered a community center provided by the district.

In 2008, a $39.4 million referendum was passed 1,845 to 1,713 which will contribute to the improvement of Schumann Elementary School, Orono Intermediate School and Orono High School. The referendum will raise taxes on a home with an estimated value of $300,000, by $125 annually. This money will be used for electrical and mechanical improvements, and interior and exterior improvements to these schools. Air conditioning will be implemented in the high school. In 2008, when this referendum was passed, seven people from Orono sued Orono Schools, saying that the vote should have been done by mail instead of at the main office of the district. The suit was dismissed by a Hennepin County District Court judge.

== Orono High School ==
Orono High School (OHS) was constructed in 1968, is the only high school in the Orono School District, and serves grades 9 through 12.

In 2023, Orono High School was named the #1 public high school in MN and 370th best nationwide.

Dr. Amy Steiner is the principal of Orono High School. She succeeded David Benson.

The high school had 950 students in the school year 2019-2020. 91 percent of the student body was of Caucasian descent with the remaining 9 percent being of American Indian/Alaskan, Asian, Black, Greek and Hispanic descent, scoring 0.19% on the diversity of scale. 5% of the student body is eligible for free or reduced lunch. The school's graduation rate is 94%, with 99% of graduates enrolled in post-secondary education.

The school has 51 teachers and an average class size of 18 with a student-teacher ratio of 19:1.

The school's academic teams consist of: Debate Team, DECA (Distributive Education Clubs of America), History Club, Literary Magazine, Math Team, Mock Trial, National Honor Society, Newspaper, Quiz Bowl team, Science Team, Speech Team, Thought Process Committee, Student Senate, and the Yearbook Photoshop team.

The school has three bands: concert band, symphonic band, and wind ensemble, as well as a jazz band, a marching band, and a pep band. The school also has four choirs: men's chorale, treble choir, concert choir, and the Four Peters. The drama department puts on three theatrical works a year: a fall musical, a winter one-act play, and a spring play.

Orono is a member of the Metro West Conference and previously was a member of the Wright County Conference and Minnesota State High School League.

The girls' softball team won the state title game in 2008.

The girls' soccer team won the state title game in 2009, defeating the Blake School, and placed 2nd in 2017, 2018, and 2019, losing all three times to Mahtomedi Senior High.

The Orono Girls Swim Team's 200 medley relay won first place at the state championship meet in November 2016 and earned an All-American consideration time.

Three most notable alumni are Cole First, Nicholas Schroeder and Noah Schultz from the 2013 graduating class.

== Orono Middle School ==
Orono Middle School (OMS) is the newest school in the district. It was built in 2000 and houses grades 6 through 8. The principal of OMS is Dr. Patricia Wroten and the associate principal is Kimberly Van Eyll.

697 students attended OMS in the 2019-2020 school year, with a student to teacher ratio of 17:1. The average class size is 26 students and the total number of teachers is 40.

== Orono Intermediate School and Schumann Elementary School ==
The Orono Intermediate School has 581 students in the grades three through five. The student teacher ratio is 19.0 and the average class size is 25.

The principal is Mrs. Marie Jodl.

The Intermediate School building, built in 1950, was the district junior and senior high school until 1968 when a new high school was built. It continued to serve as the middle school for the district until 2000, when the new Orono Middle School was built and opened.

Connected to the Intermediate School is Schumann Elementary School, which houses grades kindergarten through grade 2, and the multi-age classrooms. It is the only elementary school in the Orono School District and is the second-oldest school building in the district, constructed in 1956.

Mr. Adam Lamparske is the principal and the staff consists of 55 faculty members. The average class size is 21.

The multi-age classroom includes grades one and two and allows children of both grades to participate in classes together as opposed to a single teacher option.

== Lawsuit of 2008 ==
(2008) Seven residents of the Orono School District area filed a lawsuit against the school district after approval of a $39 million bond referendum. The residents claim that this should have been completed via the Postal Service, however, the school district completed it through the district office.

This vote was to spend this bond on improving the quality of the school district's buildings.

After declining to respond, the superintendent of schools, Karen Orcutt commented on the resident's concern, "We're certain we've done everything correctly. We're turning this over to our lawyers."

Alice Seagren, the Minnesota Education Commissioner, put an end to the lawsuit as planned. She said the referendum was "educationally and economically advisable." The lawsuit was later dismissed.
