= Maple Plain, Minnesota =

City in Minnesota, United States

- City
- Seal
- Nickname: Suplex City
- Motto: "A Proud Partner Of Active Living Hennepin County"
- Location of Maple Plain within Hennepin County, Minnesota
- Coordinates: 45°0′30″N 93°39′32″W
- Country: United States
- State: Minnesota
- County: Hennepin

Government
  - Mayor: Julie Maas-Kusske

Area
  - City: 1.07 sq mi (2.77 km^{2})
  - Land: 1.07 sq mi (2.76 km^{2})
  - Water: 0.0039 sq mi (0.01 km^{2}) 0.89%
- Elevation: 1,027 ft (313 m)

Population (2020)
  - City: 1,743
  - Density: 1,636.9/sq mi (632.02/km^{2})
  - Metro: 3,279,833
- Time zone: UTC-6 (Central)
  - Summer (DST): UTC-5 (Central)
- ZIP code: 55359
- Area code: 763
- FIPS code: 27-40256
- GNIS feature ID: 0647497
- Website: www.mapleplainmn.gov

Maple Plain is a city in Hennepin County, Minnesota, United States. The population was 1,743 at the 2020 census.

== History ==
Maple Plain is named for the many sugar maples in its forests. Settlement of the area began in 1854 and revolved around Lake Independence to its north, and its outflow Pioneer Creek. In 1868 and 1869, the St. Paul, Pacific and Manitoba Railroad was built through Maple Plain. By 1871, Maple Plain had a post office. The city was incorporated as a village in 1912. Village water came to the town in 1939, sewer circa 1950, and blacktop in 1961.

== Geography ==
U.S. Route 12 and Hennepin County Roads 19, 29, and 83 are four of the community's main routes. The city is boarded by Independence to the west.

According to the United States Census Bureau, the city has an area of 1.12 square miles (2.90 km^{2}), of which 1.11 square miles (2.87 km^{2}) is land and 0.01 square miles (0.03 km^{2}) is water. Maple Plain is 20 miles west of Minneapolis on U.S. Highway 12. Pioneer Creek flows through Maple Plain's northwest corner.

== Demographics ==
Historical population
Census	Pop.	Note	%±
1880	105		—
1920	273		—
1930	288		5.5%
1940	360		25.0%
1950	479		33.1%
1960	754		57.4%
1970	1,169		55.0%
1980	1,421		21.6%
1990	2,005		41.1%
2000	2,088		4.1%
2010	1,768		−15.3%
2020	1,743		−1.4%
U.S. Decennial Census

=== 2020 census ===
As of the 2020 census, Maple Plain had a population of 1,743. The median age was 40.1 years. 22.8% of residents were under the age of 18 and 19.0% of residents were 65 years of age or older. For every 100 females there were 102.4 males, and for every 100 females age 18 and over there were 96.9 males age 18 and over.

0.0% of residents lived in urban areas, while 100.0% lived in rural areas.

There were 734 households in Maple Plain, of which 29.6% had children under the age of 18 living in them. Of all households, 45.4% were married-couple households, 22.9% were households with a male householder and no spouse or partner present, and 23.0% were households with a female householder and no spouse or partner present. About 31.5% of all households were made up of individuals and 12.5% had someone living alone who was 65 years of age or older.

There were 775 housing units, of which 5.3% were vacant. The homeowner vacancy rate was 0.2% and the rental vacancy rate was 10.6%.

Racial composition as of the 2020 census
Race	Number	Percent
White	1,556	89.3%
Black or African American	22	1.3%
American Indian and Alaska Native	7	0.4%
Asian	22	1.3%
Native Hawaiian and Other Pacific Islander	0	0.0%
Some other race	48	2.8%
Two or more races	88	5.0%
Hispanic or Latino (of any race)	85	4.9%

=== 2010 census ===
As of the census of 2010, there were 1,768 people, 723 households, and 462 families living in the city. The population density was 1,592.8 inhabitants per square mile (615.0/km^{2}). There were 775 housing units at an average density of 698.2 per square mile (269.6/km^{2}). The racial makeup of the city was 94.2% White, 2.0% African American, 0.3% Native American, 0.6% Asian, 0.1% Pacific Islander, 1.4% from other races, and 1.4% from two or more races. Hispanic or Latino of any race were 4.8% of the population.

There were 723 households, of which 31.3% had children under the age of 18 living with them, 48.4% were married couples living together, 9.7% had a female householder with no husband present, 5.8% had a male householder with no wife present, and 36.1% were non-families. 29.5% of all households were made up of individuals, and 10.5% had someone living alone who was 65 years of age or older. The average household size was 2.36 and the average family size was 2.94.

The median age in the city was 43.1 years. 22.1% of residents were under the age of 18; 8.3% were between the ages of 18 and 24; 22.7% were from 25 to 44; 33.4% were from 45 to 64; and 13.6% were 65 years of age or older. The gender makeup of the city was 50.0% male and 50.0% female.

=== 2000 census ===
As of the census of 2000, there were 2,088 people, 770 households, and 536 families living in the city. The population density was 1,875.4 inhabitants per square mile (724.1/km^{2}). There were 786 housing units at an average density of 706.0 per square mile (272.6/km^{2}). The racial makeup of the city was 97.65% White, 0.48% African American, 0.24% Native American, 0.62% Asian, 0.38% from other races, and 0.62% from two or more races. Hispanic or Latino of any race were 0.91% of the population.

There were 770 households, out of which 41.9% had children under the age of 18 living with them, 54.8% were married couples living together, 10.9% had a female householder with no husband present, and 30.3% were non-families. 25.1% of all households were made up of individuals, and 11.0% had someone living alone who was 65 years of age or older. The average household size was 2.61 and the average family size was 3.15.

In the city, the population was spread out, with 28.9% under the age of 18, 7.5% from 18 to 24, 32.3% from 25 to 44, 20.2% from 45 to 64, and 11.2% who were 65 years of age or older. The median age was 36 years. For every 100 females, there were 91.0 males. For every 100 females age 18 and over, there were 88.6 males.

The median income for a household in the city was $50,938, and the median income for a family was $58,977. Males had a median income of $40,114 versus $32,121 for females. The per capita income for the city was $22,218. About 2.6% of families and 4.4% of the population were below the poverty line, including 3.4% of those under age 18 and 10.9% of those age 65 or over.

== Arts and culture ==
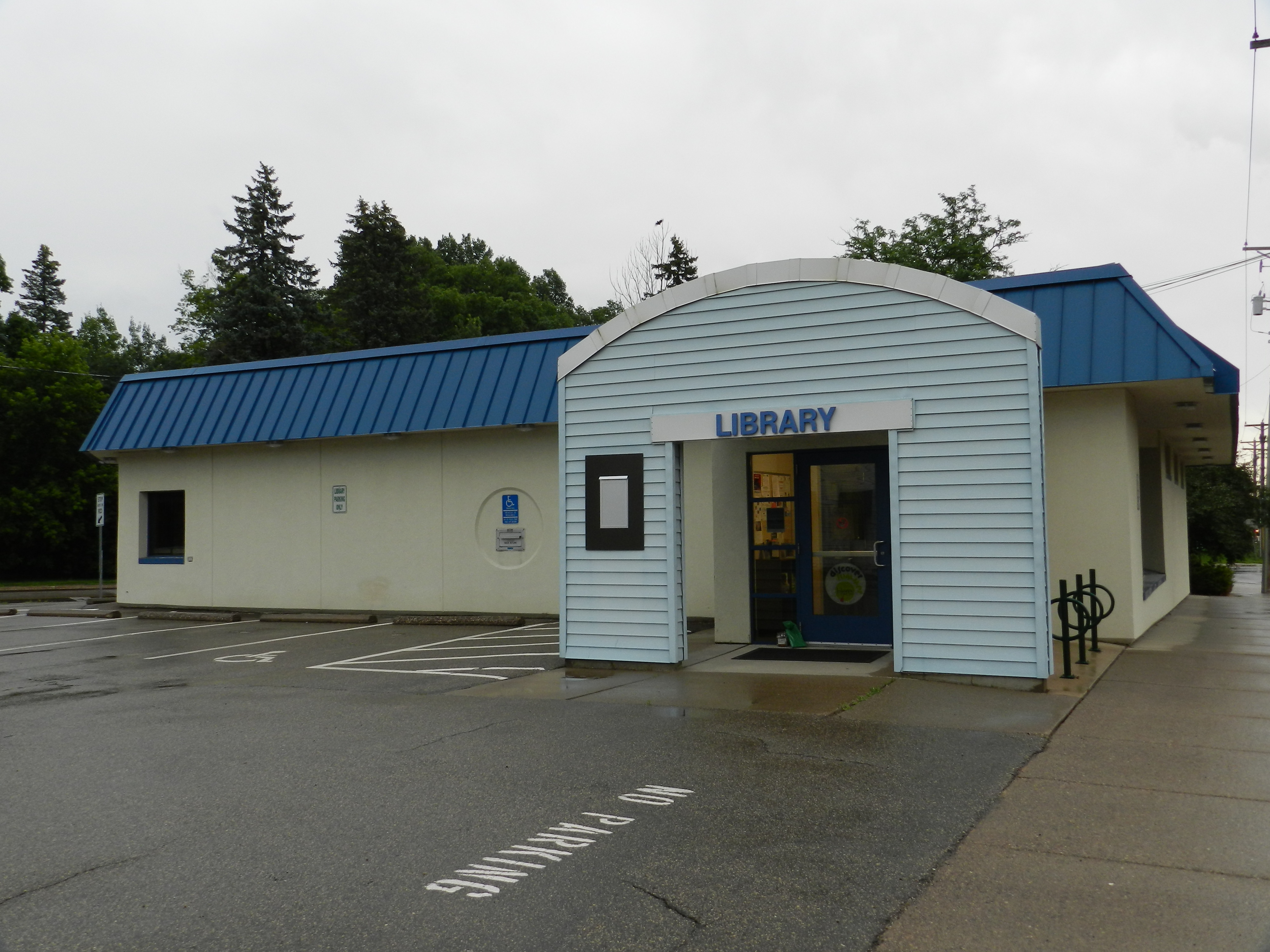
The library's facade

Maple Plain Library was founded in 1922, and moved to its current location in 1973. It is part of Hennepin County Library.

== Business ==
The company Protolabs is headquartered in Maple Plain.

== Government ==
Presidential election results

2020 Precinct Results Spreadsheet2016 Precinct Results Spreadsheet2012 Precinct Results Spreadsheet2008 Precinct Results Spreadsheet2004 Precinct Results Spreadsheet2000 Precinct Results Spreadsheet1996 Precinct Results1992 Precinct Results1988 Precinct Results1984 Precinct Results1980 Precinct Results1976 Precinct Results1968 Precinct Results1964 Precinct Results1960 Precinct Results
Year	Republican	Democratic	Third parties
2024	52.5% 561	45.7% 489	1.8% 19
2020	49.6% 525	48.4% 513	2.0% 21
2016	48.3% 481	41.2% 410	10.5% 104
2012	52.1% 552	45.8% 486	2.1% 22
2008	50.8% 515	47.5% 481	1.7% 17
2004	54.7% 568	44.2% 459	1.1% 12
2000	53.5% 540	38.5% 389	8.0% 81
1996	39.9% 379	47.1% 448	13.0% 124
1992	33.2% 344	38.0% 394	28.8% 298
1988	54.7% 522	45.3% 433	0.0% 0
1984	59.4% 477	40.6% 326	0.0% 0
1980	45.7% 359	43.8% 344	10.5% 82
1976	43.4% 308	54.6% 388	2.0% 14
1968	48.0% 231	47.8% 230	4.2% 20
1964	44.0% 168	56.0% 214	0.0% 0
1960	67.8% 244	31.7% 114	0.5% 2

== Education ==
It is in the Orono Public School District.

== Notable people ==
- Brock Lesnar, professional wrestler and former mixed martial artist, lived in Maple Plain from 2003 to 2014.
