= County Road 61 (Hennepin County, Minnesota) =

Highway in Hennepin County, Minnesota, US

County Road 61
- CR 61 highlighted in red

Route information
- Maintained by Hennepin County Transportation Department
- Length: 24.853 mi (39.997 km)
- Existed: 1960s–present

Major junctions
- South end: CR 61 in Chanhassen
- CR 4 in Eden Prairie CR 1 in Eden Prairie; I-494 / MN 5 in Eden Prairie; CR 39 in Eden Prairie; US 212 in Eden Prairie; MN 62 in Eden Prairie, Minnetonka; CR 3 in Minnetonka, Hopkins; MN 7 in Minnetonka; CR 5 in Minnetonka; I-394 in Minnetonka; CR 6 in Plymouth; MN 55 in Plymouth; CR 9 in Plymouth; CR 10 in Plymouth I-94 / I-694 in Maple Grove
- North end: CR 130 / CR 202 in Maple Grove

Location
- Country: United States
- State: Minnesota
- County: Hennepin

Highway system
- County roads of Minnesota; Hennepin County

County Road 61 or County State-Aid Highway 61 (CR 61, CSAH 61) is a 24.853-mile-long (39.997 km) major route along the east side of Interstate 494 (I-494) in Hennepin County, Minnesota. The route travels through the west suburbs of the Twin Cities through Maple Grove, Plymouth, Minnetonka, Hopkins and Eden Prairie.

== Route Description ==
Hennepin County Road 61 goes by many names. From its northern junction with CR 130 in Maple Grove, County Road 61 (CR 61) is also known as Hemlock Lane, with an interchange at I-94. Just north of its junction with CR 10 (Bass Lake Road) and the boundary with Plymouth it becomes Northwest Boulevard and continues under that name until its junction with State Highway 55 (MN 55), intersecting with CR 47 (Pineview Lane North) and CR 9 (Rockford Road). Between MN 55 and the boundary with Minnetonka it is known as Xenium Lane, intersecting with CR 6. Between the Minnetonka boundary and CR 5 (Minnetonka Boulevard), it is known as Plymouth Road, intersecting with I-394 and Cedar Lake Road. South of Minnetonka Boulevard, it changes names again to Shady Oak Road and continues into Eden Prairie, intersecting with MN 7, MN 62 and ends at US Highway 212 (US 212), but Shady Oak Road itself continues for a short distance into the "Golden Triangle" area of Eden Prairie and ends at Valley View Road. Once US 212 was shifted onto its new freeway alignment in 2008 through Eden Prairie and Chaska, the old alignment (Flying Cloud Drive) took on the designation of CR 61 continuing to the county line with Carver County.

== History ==
CR 61 was authorized and paved during the 1960s, making an alternate route for nearby I-494, intersecting with many of the same routes route I-494 did, such as I-94, MN 7, MN 55, MN 62, CR 9, CR 10, CR 5 and several others, in the western suburbs of the Twin Cities.

In the 1980s, a new interchange was built at I-394, when the new freeway was being paved from Wayzata to downtown Minneapolis. In 2008, CR 61 was extended to the old alignment of U 212 (Flying Cloud Drive), to the Carver–Hennepin county line when US 212 was shifted onto the new MN 312 freeway and the 312 number, as a state highway, was retired.

== Major Intersections ==
The entire route is in Hennepin County.

Location	mi	km	Destinations	Notes
Eden Prairie	0.000	0.000	MN 101 / CR 61	Southern terminus of Hennepin CR 61; eastern terminus of Carver CR 61
Eden Prairie	3.371	5.425	CR 1 (Pioneer Trail)	
Eden Prairie	4.782	7.696	Anderson Lakes Parkway	
Eden Prairie			Prairie Center Drive	
Eden Prairie	6.797	10.939	I-494	I-494 exit 11A; interchange.
Eden Prairie	7.133	11.479	US 212	Interchange; west end of US 212 overlap
Eden Prairie	8.273	13.314	US 212 (Shady Oak Road)	Interchange; east end of US 212 overlap
Eden Prairie	9.143	14.714	MN 62	Interchange
Minnetonka	11.293	18.174	CR 3 (Excelsior Boulevard)	
Minnetonka	11.933	19.204	MN 7	
Minnetonka	13.033	20.975	CR 5 (Minnetonka Boulevard)	East end of CR 5 overlap
Minnetonka	13.253	21.329	CR 5 (Minnetonka Boulevard)	West end of CR 5 overlap
Minnetonka	16.073	25.867	I-394	Interchange
Plymouth	16.573	26.672	CR 6	
Plymouth	18.253	29.375	MN 55	
Plymouth	22.813	36.714	CR 9 (Rockford Road)	
Plymouth	22.973	36.971	CR 10 (Bass Lake Road)	
Maple Grove			I-94 / I-694	Interchange
Maple Grove	24.853	39.997	CR 130 / CR 202 (Elm Creek Boulevard, Zachary Lane, Hemlock Lane)	Northern terminus of CR 61; southern terminus of CR 202
1.000 mi = 1.609 km; 1.000 km = 0.621 mi: Concurrency terminus; Incomplete access
