= Hassan Township, Hennepin County, Minnesota =

Township in Minnesota, United States

Hassan Township
- Township
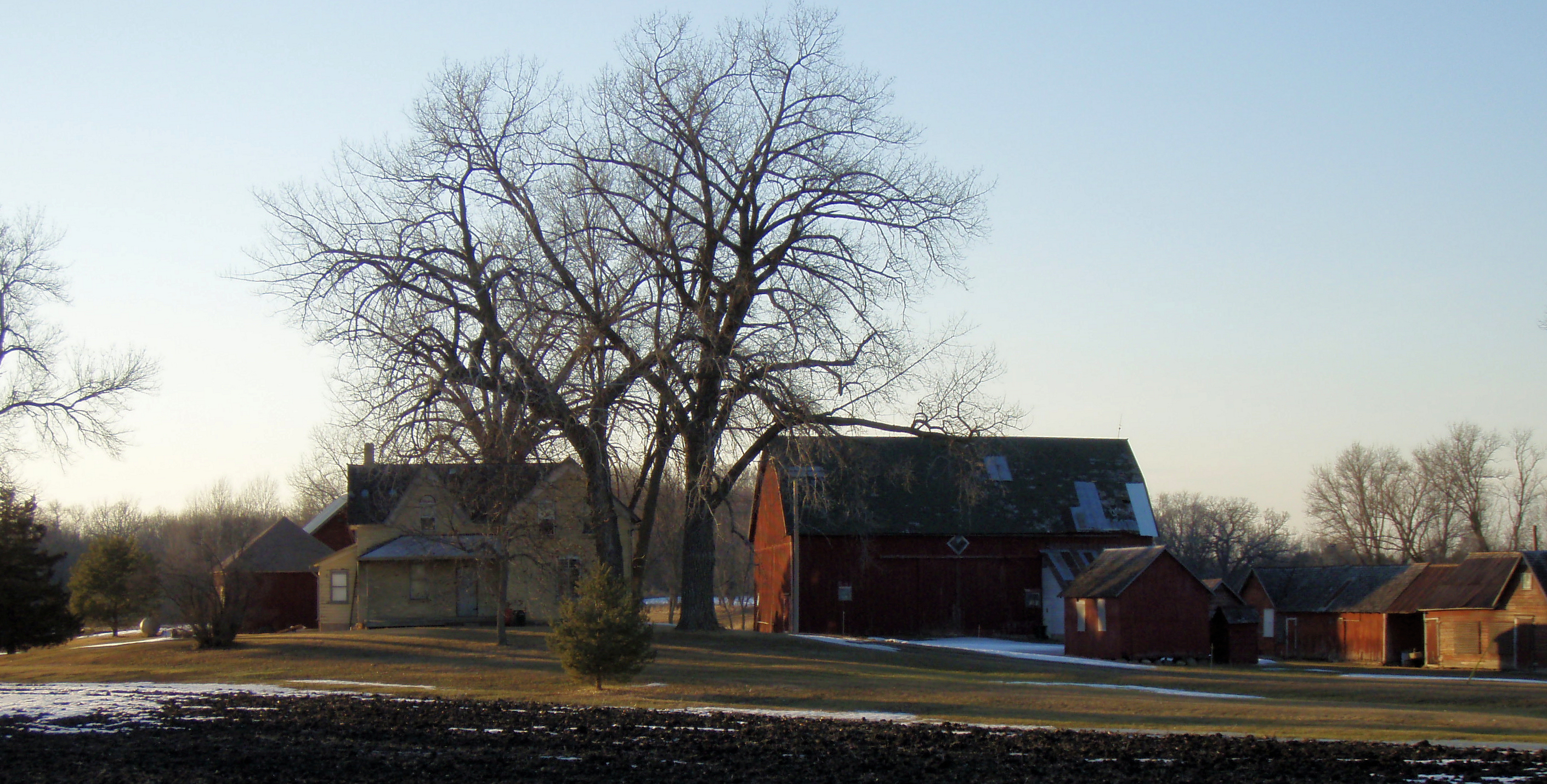
- Motto: The only Town in Hennepin County
- Location within the state of Minnesota
- Coordinates: 45°12′N 93°35′W
- Country: United States
- State: Minnesota
- County: Hennepin
- Established: 1854

Area
  - Total: 18.17 sq mi (47.07 km^{2})
  - Land: 17.44 sq mi (45.16 km^{2})
  - Water: 0.74 sq mi (1.91 km^{2})
- Elevation: 942 ft (287 m)

Population (2010)
  - Total: 2,600
  - Density: 149.1/sq mi (57.57/km^{2})
- Time zone: UTC-6 (Central (CST))
  - Summer (DST): UTC-5 (CDT)
- ZIP codes: 55374
- Area code: 763
- FIPS code: 27-27476
- GNIS feature ID: 0664409

Hassan Township was an urban township in Hennepin County, Minnesota, United States. Located in the northwestern corner of the county, it was the last remaining township in the county. The population was 2,600 at the 2010 census.

The town began incorporation proceedings in 2003 but abandoned its petition and chose to sign a Joint Powers agreement with the nearby city of Rogers to annex the entirety of Hassan Township. The Hassan Town Board approved annexation in June 2008 with orderly annexation to begin in 2012.

The origin of the name comes from the Dakota word chanhasen meaning the "sugar-maple tree" (chan, tree; haza, a tree with sap). Since the then-township of Chanhassen had established two years before Hassan, the chan syllable was dropped to avoid confusion.

== Geography ==
According to the United States Census Bureau as of its 2000 census, the township had a total area of 21.3 square miles (55 km^{2}), of which 20.4 square miles (53 km^{2}) is land and 0.9 square miles (2.3 km^{2}), or 4.32%, is water. The township completely encircled the city of Rogers. County Roads 81, 116, and 144 were three of the main routes in the township.

By the 2010 census, the area of the township had declined to 18.7 square miles (48 km^{2}), as portions of the township had already been annexed by Rogers.

== Demographics ==
Historical population
Census	Pop.	Note	%±
1860	276		—
1870	551		99.6%
1880	735		33.4%
1890	740		0.7%
1900	846		14.3%
1910	895		5.8%
1920	742		−17.1%
1930	736		−0.8%
1940	756		2.7%
1950	639		−15.5%
1960	750		17.4%
1970	917		22.3%
1980	1,766		92.6%
1990	1,951		10.5%
2000	2,463		26.2%
2010	2,600		5.6%
U.S. Decennial Census

As of the census of 2000, there were 2,463 people, 778 households, and 689 families residing in the township. The population density was 120.8 inhabitants per square mile (46.6/km^{2}). There were 788 housing units at an average density of 38.6 per square mile (14.9/km^{2}). The racial makeup of the township was 98.38% White, 0.32% African American, 0.32% Asian, 0.16% from other races, and 0.81% from two or more races. Hispanic or Latino of any race were 0.41% of the population.

There were 778 households, out of which 48.8% had children under the age of 18 living with them, 81.4% were married couples living together, 4.1% had a female householder with no husband present, and 11.4% were non-families. 8.1% of all households were made up of individuals, and 2.2% had someone living alone who was 65 years of age or older. The average household size was 3.17 and the average family size was 3.36.

In the township the population was spread out, with 32.9% under the age of 18, 5.7% from 18 to 24, 32.5% from 25 to 44, 24.5% from 45 to 64, and 4.4% who were 65 years of age or older. The median age was 36 years. For every 100 females, there were 102.5 males. For every 100 females age 18 and over, there were 103.6 males.

The median income for a household in the township was $79,158, and the median income for a family was $81,832. Males had a median income of $46,689 versus $35,313 for females. The per capita income for the township was $27,350. None of the families and 0.3% of the population were living below the poverty line, including no under eighteens and none of those over 64.

== History ==
At the time of its annexation into Rogers, Hassan was the sole remaining township in Hennepin County. The Town of Hassan was classified as an Urban Township which provided for the exercising of more powers than non-urban townships.

Hassan was located along the south bank of the Crow River and bisected by Interstate 94, approximately 20 miles (32 km) northwest of downtown Minneapolis. The City of Rogers lay entirely within the original township. Hassan's rolling landscape was composed of farmsteads, cultivated fields, scattered homes and subdivisions separated by wetlands, woodlands, and drainageways.

Settlement in 1854 by European immigrants brought about major changes in the landscape of what is now Hassan Township. Originally, as part of the "Big Woods", the areas was heavily timbered with oak, elm, basswood, ash, and maple. Large areas of marshland also existed. As settlers arrived, the woods were cleared and the land was tilled for farmstead construction and crop production.

Early on, small trade centers, known as hamlets, emerged in Hassan Township to serve the needs of the settlers. The hamlet of Hassan was first settled in 1854 and then organized in 1860 along Territorial Road in Section 21. Between 1854 and 1881, Hassan contained a clustering of houses, a post office, St. John's Episcopal Church, a school and a town hall. Today, an altered school, a church and town hall remain. Today, a few businesses still thrive in Hassan, including Hassan Sand and Gravel, Minuteman Services, and Town and Country Landscaping, among others.

Although not the earliest settlement, Fletcher, originally named St. Walburga by German immigrants, has become the most notable. It stands at the intersection of Territorial Road and County Road 116 (Fletcher Lane) in Hassan Township. Fletcher is considered to be the "finest example of a traditional crossroads hamlet in Hennepin County" and is eligible to become a historic district by the Minnesota Historical Society.

Territorial Road crosses over a series of ridges, including a section that includes the highest point in Hennepin County. It was authorized by the Territorial Legislature in 1855 and identified as the "first legitimate outlet" for this section of Hennepin County. Through the years, it became a major transportation route for Hassan Township and surrounding communities "because it was maintained and it provided relatively easy access to Minneapolis markets." (Hennepin History Museum; 1995).
