= A81 =

A81 or A-81 may refer to:

- A81 Music Recording artist A81 Los Angeles California 1988-Present
- A81 motorway (France)
- A81 road (Scotland)
- A81 motorway (Germany)
- Dutch Defence, in the Encyclopaedia of Chess Openings
- RFA Brambleleaf (A81), a Royal Fleet Auxiliary Tanker
- Iceberg A-81, iceberg that calved from the Brunt Ice Shelf in January 2023
