= Virginia State Route 81 =

The following highways in Virginia have been known as State Route 81:

- State Route 81 (Virginia 1933–1940), Lodi to West Virginia
- State Route 81 (Virginia 1940–1958), now State Route 69
- Interstate 81 (Virginia), 1957–present
