= Greenfield, Minnesota =

City in Minnesota, United States

- City
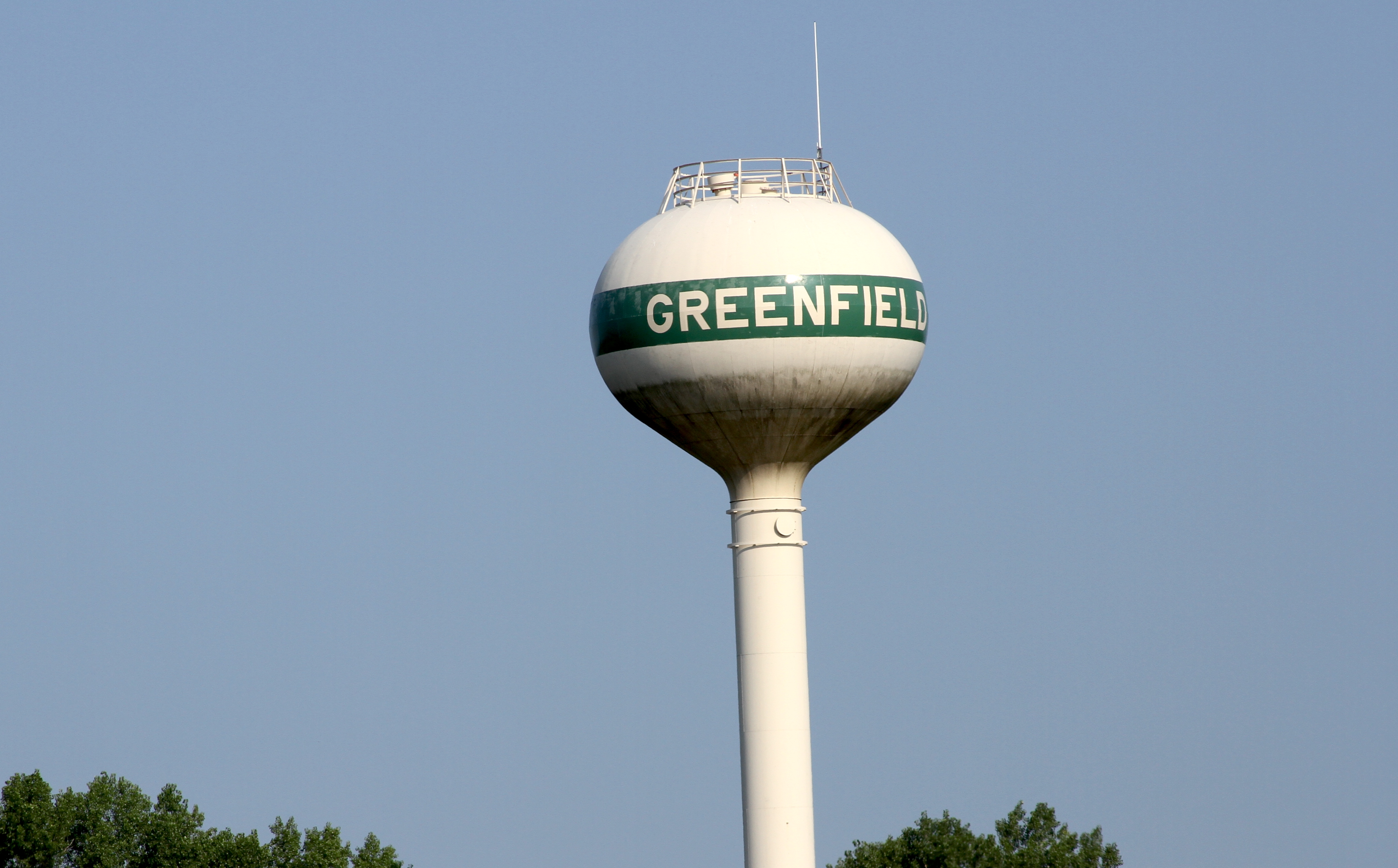
- Water tower

- Logo
- Motto: "Spirit of Place"
- Location of Greenfield within Hennepin County, Minnesota
- Coordinates: 45°5′52″N 93°41′5″W
- Country: United States
- State: Minnesota
- County: Hennepin
- Incorporated: March 14, 1958

Government
  - Mayor: Brad Johnson

Area
  - City: 21.51 sq mi (55.71 km^{2})
  - Land: 20.37 sq mi (52.77 km^{2})
  - Water: 1.14 sq mi (2.94 km^{2})
- Elevation: 1,001 ft (305 m)

Population (2020)
  - City: 2,903
  - Density: 142.5/sq mi (55.02/km^{2})
  - Metro: 3,279,833
- Time zone: UTC-6 (Central)
  - Summer (DST): UTC-5 (Central)
- ZIP codes: 55357, 55373
- Area code: 763
- FIPS code: 27-25622
- GNIS feature ID: 1669530
- Website: https://greenfieldmn.gov/

Greenfield is a city in northwestern Hennepin County, Minnesota. It has a population of 2,903 residents, according to the 2020 United States census, and is located 26.5 miles northwest of Minneapolis. It is part of the Twin Cities Metropolitan Statistical Area.

== Geography ==
According to the United States Census Bureau, the city has a total area of 21.55 square miles (55.81 km^{2}), of which 20.40 square miles (52.84 km^{2}) is land and 1.15 square miles (2.98 km^{2}) is water.

Minnesota State Highway 55 serves as the main road in the city. Greenfield is located along the Crow River, which flows through the Downtown River District and divides Hennepin County and Wright County. Nearby towns include Loretto, Rockford, Corcoran, Hanover, Buffalo, and Maple Grove.

== History ==
Before Greenfield was a town, the area was originally known as Greenwood Township. According to the Minnesota Historical Society, Greenfield became incorporated on March 14, 1958.

== Education ==
Greenfield's main school district is Rockford Area Schools #883. The school district includes an elementary school (preschool to 4th grade), a middle school (grades 5th through 8th), and a high school (grades 9th through 12th). The elementary focuses mainly on an arts program, while the middle and high schools put more of an emphasis on technology. The Rockford school district was established by the Wright County commissioners on September 6, 1856, and the first school house was constructed by 1860. During the 1960s, the school underwent redistricting that gave its current designation as Independent School District #883.

Although the Rockford school district serves Rockford and most of Greenfield, a small portion of Greenfield is designated to the Buffalo-Hanover-Montrose (BHM) School District #877. Students in the district attend elementary school in Hanover for grades K-5; however, for grades 6–8, students are bussed to Buffalo Community Middle School in Buffalo, Minnesota. The high school for the district, Buffalo High School, is also located in Buffalo. It is known for its arts magnet program. Portions of Greenfield are also located in the Delano school district.

Salem Lutheran School is a Christian Pre-K-8 school of the Wisconsin Evangelical Lutheran Synod in Greenfield.

== Places of interest ==
The Lake Rebecca Park Reserve sits on the southwestern edge of Greenfield. It has a gently rolling landscape and numerous wetland areas. It also has biking trails, a playground, and a boat launch. In addition to the many outdoor opportunities found there, the park is a haven for wildlife.

== Demographics ==
Historical population
Census	Pop.	Note	%±
1860	215		—
1870	425		97.7%
1880	604		42.1%
1890	704		16.6%
1900	780		10.8%
1910	733		−6.0%
1920	711		−3.0%
1930	688		−3.2%
1940	694		0.9%
1950	637		−8.2%
1960	639		0.3%
1970	977		52.9%
1980	1,391		42.4%
1990	1,450		4.2%
2000	2,544		75.4%
2010	2,777		9.2%
2020	2,903		4.5%
U.S. Decennial Census

=== 2020 census ===
As of the 2020 census, Greenfield had a population of 2,903. The median age was 42.3 years. 26.3% of residents were under the age of 18 and 12.9% of residents were 65 years of age or older. For every 100 females there were 104.6 males, and for every 100 females age 18 and over there were 101.9 males age 18 and over.

0.0% of residents lived in urban areas, while 100.0% lived in rural areas.

There were 1,013 households in Greenfield, of which 35.8% had children under the age of 18 living in them. Of all households, 71.3% were married-couple households, 11.5% were households with a male householder and no spouse or partner present, and 12.8% were households with a female householder and no spouse or partner present. About 14.5% of all households were made up of individuals and 6.2% had someone living alone who was 65 years of age or older.

There were 1,039 housing units, of which 2.5% were vacant. The homeowner vacancy rate was 0.7% and the rental vacancy rate was 0.0%.

Racial composition as of the 2020 census
Race	Number	Percent
White	2,681	92.4%
Black or African American	24	0.8%
American Indian and Alaska Native	9	0.3%
Asian	28	1.0%
Native Hawaiian and Other Pacific Islander	0	0.0%
Some other race	24	0.8%
Two or more races	137	4.7%
Hispanic or Latino (of any race)	39	1.3%

=== Demographic estimates ===
40.3% of Greenfield residents originate from a German heritage, while 14.8% of residents originate from a Norwegian heritage. Other notable heritages are Polish, Irish, and English.

Greenfield's employment rate is 65.8% with a median household income of $123,817, compared to the $73,382 median household income of Minnesota. 49.3% of residents have received a Bachelor's degree or higher.

In Greenfield, the average resident's commute to work is 31.4 minutes. 86.5% of residents drive to work alone and 9.8% of residents work from home. Top industries that residents work under are Professional, scientific, management, administrative and waste management services (17.8%), Construction (17.1%), Educational services, health care and social assistance (15.3%), Manufacturing (11.8%), and Retail trade (8.5%).

Of Greenfield's residents, 94.2% are homeowners, compared to an average of 71.9% in the state of Minnesota.

=== 2010 census ===
As of the census of 2010, there were 2,777 people, 936 households, and 771 families residing in the city. The population density was 136.1 inhabitants per square mile (52.5/km^{2}). There were 970 housing units at an average density of 47.5 per square mile (18.3/km^{2}). The racial makeup of the city was 96.1% White, 0.4% African American, 0.3% Native American, 1.3% Asian, 0.9% from other races, and 0.9% from two or more races. Hispanic or Latino of any race were 1.5% of the population.

There were 936 households, of which 40.2% had children under the age of 18 living with them, 75.3% were married couples living together, 4.5% had a female householder with no husband present, 2.6% had a male householder with no wife present, and 17.6% were non-families. 13.5% of all households were made up of individuals, and 4.1% had someone living alone who was 65 years of age or older. The average household size was 2.97 and the average family size was 3.28.

The median age in the city was 41.1 years. 29.7% of residents were under the age of 18; 6.9% were between the ages of 18 and 24; 20.4% were from 25 to 44; 35.9% were from 45 to 64; and 7.1% were 65 years of age or older. The gender makeup of the city was 50.4% male and 49.6% female.

=== 2000 census ===
As of the census of 2000, there were 2,544 people, 817 households, and 674 families residing in the city. The population density was 124.5 inhabitants per square mile (48.1/km^{2}). There were 824 housing units at an average density of 40.3 per square mile (15.6/km^{2}). The racial makeup of the city was 97.72% White, 0.39% African American, 0.24% Native American, 0.63% Asian, 0.20% from other races, and 0.83% from two or more races. Hispanic or Latino of any race were 0.79% of the population.

There were 817 households, out of which 46.6% had children under the age of 18 living with them, 71.5% were married couples living together, 6.1% had a female householder with no husband present, and 17.5% were non-families. 12.0% of all households were made up of individuals, and 2.8% had someone living alone who was 65 years of age or older. The average household size was 3.11 and the average family size was 3.39.

In the city, the population was spread out, with 33.8% under the age of 18, 7.5% from 18 to 24, 33.7% from 25 to 44, 21.2% from 45 to 64, and 3.8% who were 65 years of age or older. The median age was 33 years. For every 100 females, there were 105.5 males. For every 100 females age 18 and over, there were 103.7 males.

The median income for a household in the city was $80,933, and the median income for a family was $86,032. Males had a median income of $50,784 versus $33,875 for females. The per capita income for the city was $29,270. About 0.7% of families and 2.5% of the population were below the poverty line, including 1.1% of those under age 18 and 2.7% of those age 65 or over.

== Politics ==
Presidential election results

2020 Precinct Results Spreadsheet2016 Precinct Results Spreadsheet2012 Precinct Results Spreadsheet2008 Precinct Results Spreadsheet2004 Precinct Results Spreadsheet2000 Precinct Results Spreadsheet1996 Precinct Results1992 Precinct Results1988 Precinct Results1984 Precinct Results1980 Precinct Results1976 Precinct Results1968 Precinct Results1964 Precinct Results1960 Precinct Results
Year	Republican	Democratic	Third parties
2024	64.8% 1,343	32.8% 679	2.4% 50
2020	65.6% 1,315	32.6% 653	1.8% 36
2016	67.1% 1,203	26.0% 466	6.9% 124
2012	66.7% 1,181	32.0% 567	1.3% 23
2008	66.9% 1,127	31.9% 537	1.2% 21
2004	67.6% 1,016	31.7% 477	0.7% 11
2000	59.9% 724	33.4% 404	6.7% 80
1996	44.9% 362	39.4% 318	15.7% 127
1992	38.5% 309	29.0% 233	32.5% 261
1988	54.5% 371	45.5% 310	0.0% 0
1984	59.5% 380	40.5% 259	0.0% 0
1980	52.2% 320	40.9% 251	6.9% 42
1976	43.8% 214	53.2% 260	3.0% 15
1968	42.7% 147	52.6% 181	4.7% 16
1964	42.3% 119	57.7% 162	0.0% 0
1960	59.5% 173	40.2% 117	0.3% 1
