= County Road 81 (Hennepin County, Minnesota) =

Highway in Hennepin County, Minnesota, US

County State-Aid Highway 81
- West Broadway; Bottineau Boulevard
- CR 81 highlighted in red

Route information
- Maintained by Hennepin County Transportation Department
- Length: 19.857 mi (31.957 km)
- Existed: 1988–present

Major junctions
- South end: CR 66 / CR 152 (Washington Ave N) in Minneapolis
- I-94 / US 52 in Minneapolis MN 100 in Robbinsdale; I-94 / I-694 / US 52 in Brooklyn Park; US 169 in Brooklyn Park MN 610 in Maple Grove
- North end: I-94 / MN 101 / US 52 in Rogers

Location
- Country: United States
- State: Minnesota
- County: Hennepin

Highway system
- County roads of Minnesota; Hennepin County

County State-Aid Highway 81, also known as County Road 81, (County 81) is a county highway in Hennepin County, Minnesota, which runs from its interchange with Interstate 94 (I-94), CR 66, and CR 152 (Washington Avenue North) in the city of Minneapolis, and continues northwest to its terminus at Main Street (State Highway 101, MN 101) in suburban Rogers. CR 81 is approximately 20 miles (32 km) long.

== Route description ==
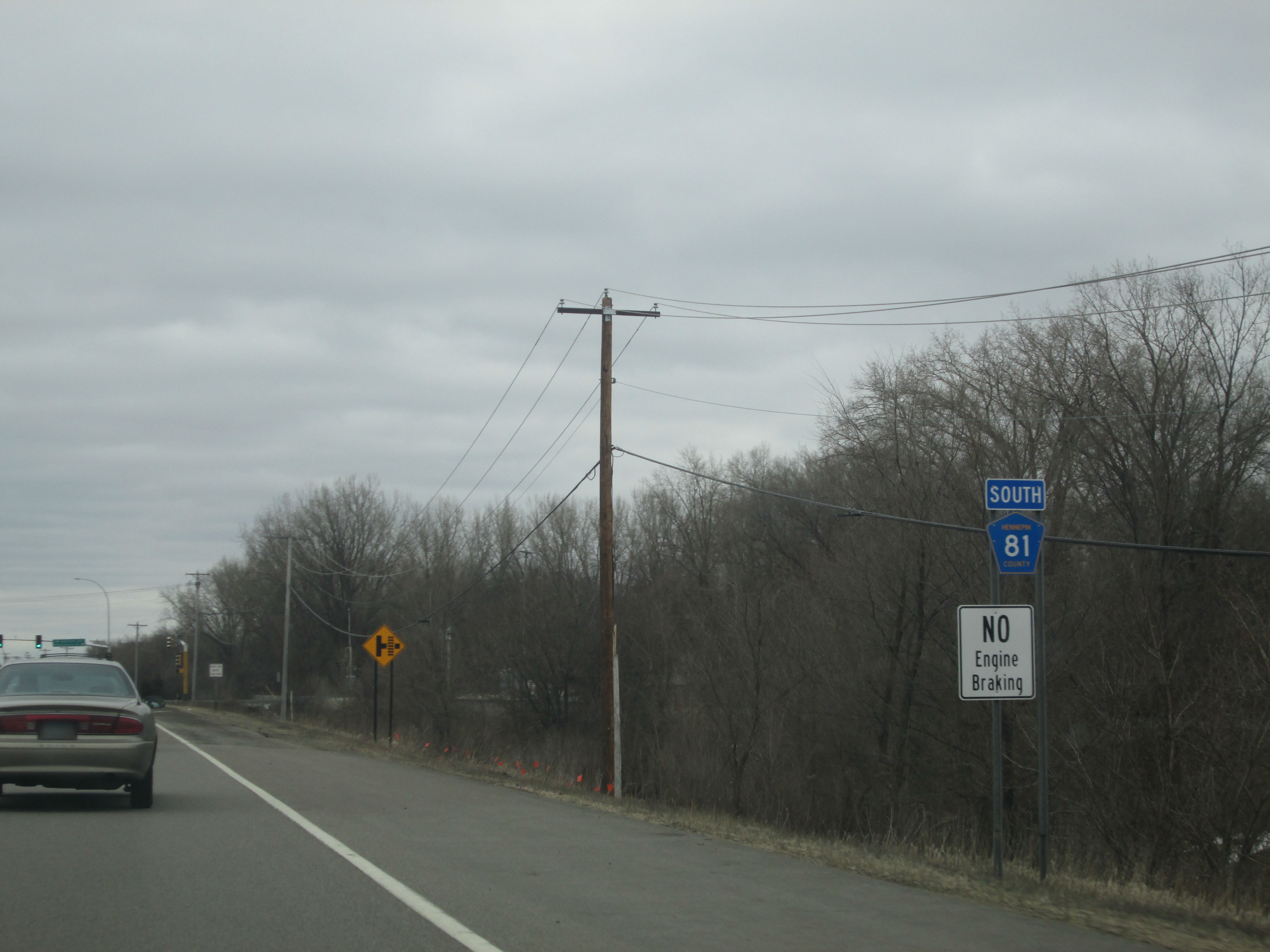
County Road 81 near US 169 in Brooklyn Park, going southbound.

County Road 81 (CR 81) begins at the intersection with Washington Avenue (CR 152/CR 66), in Minneapolis. It goes northwest into the city of Robbinsdale, intersecting with CR 9 (42nd Avenue) and has an interchange MN 100. It enters Crystal shortly after the interchange, intersecting with CR 10 (Bass Lake Road) and several smaller roads. It enters Brooklyn Park, south of its intersection with 63rd Avenue. In the city, the route has an interchange with I-94 / I-694. Afterwards, it intersects with several county roads: CR 152 and CR 130 (Brooklyn Boulevard,) and CR 109. It also has a new interchange with US Highway 169 (US 169). In Osseo, it intersects with Jefferson Highway / Central Avenue. In Maple Grove it intersects with Zachary Lane North, CR 30 (93rd Avenue), CR 130 (Elm Creek Boulevard), MN 610, Fernbrook Lane and Maple Grove Parkway. In Dayton, it intersects with CR 101 / CR 13. In Rogers it intersects with CR 150 and becomes MN 101 at I-94. From Rogers to Robbinsdale the speed limit stays between 45 and 55 mph (70 and 90 km/h); near downtown Minneapolis it is 35 mph (55 km/h).

== History ==
CR 81, between the Robbinsdale and Minneapolis border and present-day US 169 in Brooklyn Park, was constructed between the late 1940s and 1950s. CR 81 was the main road connecting Minneapolis and the northwest until I-94 and I-494 were completed.

Formerly a trunk highway supervised by the state and known as US 52, US 169, MN 101, MN 152, and MN 218 in various segments at various times, the state turned over management of the roadway to Hennepin County in 1988 and it was renumbered to CR 81. From 1982 to 1988, a portion of the route was known as MN 81.

In 2005, the portion of CR 81 from Rogers to Robbinsdale was signed as Bottineau Boulevard, named after historic frontiersman Pierre Bottineau. The portion of CR 81 in North Minneapolis is still signed as West Broadway.

In 2004, the at-grade intersection with MN 100 was converted into an interchange along with other intersections on MN 100 during a reconstruction project. In 2008, a reconstruction project in Robbinsdale (Lowry Avenue to MN 100) was completed. Also, in Maple Grove, a reconstruction project near Fernbrook Lane, Elm Creek Boulevard, and Maple Grove Parkway was completed, reconstructing the Fernbrook Lane intersection and adding new intersections at Elm Creek Boulevard and Maple Grove Parkway, when Elm Creek Boulevard was extended and Maple Grove Parkway was paved to its reconstructed interchange with I-94.

In 2011, the intersection with US 169 was converted into an interchange, along with the road's reconstruction from the former intersection with US 169 to CR 109 (85th Avenue), the extension of the nearby 83rd Avenue North and construction on local streets. Also in 2011, when MN 610 was extended, a half of a new interchange was built south of CR 130 (Elm Creek Boulevard) near the end of the new portion of MN 610. In Rogers, CR 81's terminus was moved from its former intersection with MN 101/CR 150 to MN 101's interchange with I-94. Also the intersection with MN 101 and CR 150 was demolished, during a different road construction project.

A 7.5-mile (12.1 km) segment of CR 81 reconstruction project began in 2010. This section is from 47th Avenue North in the city of Robbinsdale to CR 30 in the city of Maple Grove, resulting ultimately in a six-lane divided urban roadway. The project also passes through the cities of Crystal, Brooklyn Park, and Osseo. The goals of this project were to improve the safety and operations along the roadway. Changes were made to existing access, and major intersections were also reconstructed. Construction occurred in segments. Construction of Segment One (47th Avenue North in Robbinsdale to CR 10/Bass Lake Road in Crystal) began in 2010, and was completed in the summer of 2012. The construction of Segment Two (CR 81/Bass Lake Road in Crystal to 63rd Avenue North in Brooklyn Park) also began in 2012. Segments 3 and 4 (63rd Avenue to US 169, US 169 to CR 30/93rd Avenue) were last to be funded.

== Future ==
Since 2000, local governments and business leaders in the CR 81 corridor (also known as the Northwest Corridor Partnership) have been working together on a strategic redevelopment plan supported by a transit line. Rapid bus transit was originally considered for this corridor in the early 2000s. Since 2007, light rail transit is now being studied as the more favorable option.

== Major intersections ==
The entire route is in Hennepin County.

Location	mi	km	Destinations	Notes
Minneapolis	0.000	0.000	CR 66 / CR 152 east (Washington Avenue North)	Southern terminus near downtown Minneapolis
Minneapolis	0.061	0.098	I-94 / US 52	Interchange
Minneapolis	0.306	0.492	Lyndale Avenue	
Minneapolis	0.755	1.215	CR 66 west (Girard Avenue North)	
Minneapolis	1.456	2.343	CR 2 (Penn Avenue North)	
Minneapolis	2.278	3.666	CR 153 (Lowry Avenue, Oakdale Avenue, Theodore Wirth Parkway)	Interchange
Robbinsdale	2.920	4.699	36th Avenue North	
Robbinsdale	3.927	6.320	CR 9 (42nd Avenue North)	
Robbinsdale	4.199– 4.424	6.758– 7.120	MN 100	Converted from at-grade to interchange in 2004
Crystal	5.759	9.268	CR 10 (Bass Lake Road)	
Brooklyn Park	7.537– 7.727	12.130– 12.435	I-94 / I-694 / US 52	Interchange
Brooklyn Park	7.975	12.835	CR 8 (West Broadway)	
Brooklyn Park	8.793	14.151	CR 130 / CR 152 (Brooklyn Boulevard)	
Brooklyn Park	9.595– 9.874	15.442– 15.891	US 169	Converted from at-grade to interchange in 2011
Brooklyn Park	9.904	15.939	CR 109 (85th Avenue North)	
Osseo	10.519	16.929	Jefferson Highway, Central Avenue	
Maple Grove	11.599	18.667	CR 202 (Zachary Lane North)	
Maple Grove	11.894	19.142	CR 30 (93rd Avenue North)	
Maple Grove	12.746– 13.019	20.513– 20.952	MN 610 / CR 130 (Elm Creek Boulevard)	Interchange with MN 610 was completed in 2011; intersection with County Road 130/Elm Creek Boulevard was completed in 2008
Maple Grove	13.921	22.404	CR 121 (Maple Grove Parkway)	
Dayton	17.494	28.154	CR 13 / CR 101 (Brockton Lane)	Formerly Old 101 uses CR 81
Rogers	19.631	31.593	CR 150 (Main Street)	Included in the former intersection with MN 101, south of intersection; former terminus
Rogers	19.857	31.957	I-94 / MN 101 / US 52	Current Northern terminus in Rogers
1.000 mi = 1.609 km; 1.000 km = 0.621 mi: Concurrency terminus; Incomplete access
