= Washington Avenue (Minneapolis) =

Street in Minneapolis, Minnesota, USA

Coordinates: 44°59′26″N 93°16′51″W

- Interactive map of Washington Avenue
- North end: Lyndale Ave at N 41st Ave, Minneapolis
- South end: Cedar Avenue (Washington Ave SE continues east of river)

Washington Avenue is a major thoroughfare in Minneapolis, Minnesota, United States. Starting north of Lowry Avenue, North Washington Avenue runs straight south, with Interstate 94 running alongside it until just south of West Broadway, when the freeway turns to the west. The street continues running straight until just south of Plymouth Avenue, where it turns in a southeasterly direction heading for Downtown Minneapolis. It forms the main thoroughfare through the Warehouse District.

The scenery changes at Hennepin Avenue, where the designation changes to South Washington Avenue. This area, once known as the Gateway District, was heavily affected by urban renewal policies of the 1950s and 60s, destroying what had at one point been the heart of the city. Dozens of city blocks were bulldozed and replaced with modern glass structures - or in many cases, surface parking lots. The portion of the street from Hennepin to what is now Interstate 35W was widened and a median was added.

Further changes occurred to the east of the Interstate. Washington used to turn at the Seven Corners intersection (where Washington meets Cedar Avenue) and continue across the old Washington Avenue Bridge into Southeast Minneapolis. However, the old bridge was replaced in the 1960s with a new one which meets Washington east of the Mississippi River but doesn't connect with Washington west of it, instead connecting to a short freeway stub into downtown. There is a one-block portion of the old alignment between Cedar and 19th Avenues that is branded as Washington Avenue, but to continue east of the river, one must travel down Cedar one block and turn east at 3rd Street and get on an entrance ramp to the bridge.

East of the river, Washington Avenue Southeast acts as a major thoroughfare through the University of Minnesota campus; a portion of this section has been converted to a transit mall to facilitate the METRO Green Line, opened in June 2014, along with METRO bus service which ran on Washington for decades until the reconfiguration. The street continues east for six blocks before ending at SE University Avenue; the area east of Harvard Street comprises the Stadium Village district.
