= Independence, Minnesota =

City in Minnesota, United States

- City
- Seal

- Location of the city of Independence within Hennepin County, Minnesota
- Coordinates: 45°1′3″N 93°41′58″W
- Country: United States
- State: Minnesota
- County: Hennepin
- Organized: April 11, 1858
- Incorporated: 1957 (village); 1974 (city)

Government
  - Mayor: Brad Spencer

Area
  - City: 34.58 sq mi (89.55 km^{2})
  - Land: 32.43 sq mi (84.00 km^{2})
  - Water: 2.15 sq mi (5.56 km^{2})
- Elevation: 978 ft (298 m)

Population (2020)
  - City: 3,755
  - Density: 116/sq mi (44.7/km^{2})
  - Metro: 3,279,833
- Time zone: UTC-6 (Central)
  - Summer (DST): UTC-5 (Central)
- ZIP codes: 55357, 55359
- Area code: 763
- FIPS code: 27-30842
- GNIS feature ID: 0645396
- Website: www.ci.independence.mn.us

Independence is a rural city in Hennepin County, Minnesota, United States. Most of the city is agricultural land with dense woods and numerous lakes. It is named after Lake Independence, a large lake on the community's eastern boundary.

The population was 3,755 at the 2020 census. U.S. Highway 12 serves as a main route in the community.

== History ==
The city's origins begin when settlers organized Independence Township in 1858 as a result of the Treaty of Traverse des Sioux. Independence Township was incorporated as the Village of Independence in 1957, eventually being reincorporated as a city in 1974.

== Geography ==
According to the United States Census Bureau, the city has an area of 34.56 square miles (89.51 km^{2}), of which 32.37 square miles (83.84 km^{2}) is land and 2.19 square miles (5.67 km^{2}) is water. Independence is 24 miles west of Minneapolis.

== Demographics ==
Historical population
| Census | Pop. | Note | %± |
|---|---|---|---|
| 1860 | 223 | | — |
| 1870 | 502 | | 125.1% |
| 1880 | 842 | | 67.7% |
| 1890 | 1,035 | | 22.9% |
| 1900 | 1,368 | | 32.2% |
| 1910 | 1,427 | | 4.3% |
| 1920 | 1,269 | | −11.1% |
| 1930 | 1,184 | | −6.7% |
| 1940 | 1,207 | | 1.9% |
| 1950 | 1,203 | | −0.3% |
| 1960 | 1,446 | | 20.2% |
| 1970 | 1,993 | | 37.8% |
| 1980 | 2,640 | | 32.5% |
| 1990 | 2,822 | | 6.9% |
| 2000 | 3,236 | | 14.7% |
| 2010 | 3,504 | | 8.3% |
| 2020 | 3,755 | | 7.2% |
U.S. Decennial Census

=== 2020 census ===
As of the 2020 census, Independence had a population of 3,755. The median age was 43.9 years. 25.0% of residents were under the age of 18 and 16.0% of residents were 65 years of age or older. For every 100 females there were 109.4 males, and for every 100 females age 18 and over there were 105.4 males age 18 and over.

0.0% of residents lived in urban areas, while 100.0% lived in rural areas.

There were 1,288 households in Independence, of which 34.7% had children under the age of 18 living in them. Of all households, 75.5% were married-couple households, 10.4% were households with a male householder and no spouse or partner present, and 10.2% were households with a female householder and no spouse or partner present. About 13.3% of all households were made up of individuals and 5.7% had someone living alone who was 65 years of age or older.

There were 1,357 housing units, of which 5.1% were vacant. The homeowner vacancy rate was 1.0% and the rental vacancy rate was 10.7%.

Racial composition as of the 2020 census
| Race | Number | Percent |
|---|---|---|
| White | 3,516 | 93.6% |
| Black or African American | 18 | 0.5% |
| American Indian and Alaska Native | 9 | 0.2% |
| Asian | 38 | 1.0% |
| Native Hawaiian and Other Pacific Islander | 0 | 0.0% |
| Some other race | 38 | 1.0% |
| Two or more races | 136 | 3.6% |
| Hispanic or Latino (of any race) | 74 | 2.0% |

=== 2010 census ===
As of the census of 2010, there were 3,504 people, 1,241 households, and 1,009 families living in the city. The population density was 108.2 inhabitants per square mile (41.8/km^{2}). There were 1,305 housing units at an average density of 40.3 per square mile (15.6/km^{2}). The racial makeup of the city was 97.1% White, 0.3% African American, 0.3% Native American, 1.1% Asian, 0.2% from other races, and 1.0% from two or more races. Hispanic or Latino of any race were 1.3% of the population.

There were 1,241 households, of which 37.2% had children under the age of 18 living with them, 74.1% were married couples living together, 4.4% had a female householder with no husband present, 2.9% had a male householder with no wife present, and 18.7% were non-families. 14.9% of all households were made up of individuals, and 4.7% had someone living alone who was 65 years of age or older. The average household size was 2.80 and the average family size was 3.13.

The median age in the city was 45.6 years. 26.3% of residents were under the age of 18; 5.8% were between the ages of 18 and 24; 16.6% were from 25 to 44; 38.9% were from 45 to 64; and 12.5% were 65 years of age or older. The gender makeup of the city was 50.9% male and 49.1% female.

=== 2000 census ===
As of the census of 2000, there were 3,236 people, 1,088 households, and 908 families living in the city. The population density was 99.3 inhabitants per square mile (38.3/km^{2}). There were 1,115 housing units at an average density of 34.2 per square mile (13.2/km^{2}). The racial makeup of the city was 97.74% White, 0.09% African American, 0.19% Native American, 1.05% Asian, 0.03% Pacific Islander, 0.22% from other races, and 0.68% from two or more races. Hispanic or Latino of any race were 0.87% of the population.

There were 1,088 households, out of which 40.5% had children under the age of 18 living with them, 75.4% were married couples living together, 5.0% had a female householder with no husband present, and 16.5% were non-families. 11.7% of all households were made up of individuals, and 3.2% had someone living alone who was 65 years of age or older. The average household size was 2.97 and the average family size was 3.25.

In the city, the population was spread out, with 30.1% under the age of 18, 5.0% from 18 to 24, 29.0% from 25 to 44, 27.7% from 45 to 64, and 8.2% who were 65 years of age or older. The median age was 39 years. For every 100 females, there were 105.1 males. For every 100 females age 18 and over, there were 103.2 males.

The median income for a household in the city was $79,126, and the median income for a family was $82,143. Males had a median income of $50,793 versus $40,625 for females. The per capita income for the city was $35,753. About 0.8% of families and 1.3% of the population were below the poverty line, including 1.3% of those under age 18 and none of those age 65 or over.

== Politics ==
Independence has been a Republican jurisdiction in Minnesota in recent years. The city has voted for every Republican presidential nominee since 1980, with the last five campaigns carrying the town by a margin of over 25 points each.

Independence mayor Marvin Johnson, who served 45 years in office from his election in 1979 to his retirement in 2025, was the longest-serving mayor in Minnesota history.

Presidential election results 1960–2024

Precinct General Election Results
| Year | Republican | Democratic | Third parties |
|---|---|---|---|
| 2024 | 58.2% 1,517 | 39.2% 1,022 | 2.7% 69 |
| 2020 | 57.7% 1,545 | 40.3% 1,080 | 2.0% 54 |
| 2016 | 58.6% 1,428 | 32.5% 793 | 8.9% 216 |
| 2012 | 65.3% 1,593 | 33.8% 825 | 0.9% 23 |
| 2008 | 63.1% 1,463 | 35.1% 813 | 1.8% 41 |
| 2004 | 66.0% 1,516 | 32.9% 755 | 1.1% 25 |
| 2000 | 61.5% 1,180 | 32.0% 615 | 6.5% 125 |
| 1996 | 48.4% 780 | 38.5% 621 | 13.1% 211 |
| 1992 | 42.4% 704 | 28.3% 469 | 29.3% 487 |
| 1988 | 57.8% 846 | 42.2% 617 | 0.0% 0 |
| 1984 | 62.7% 860 | 37.3% 511 | 0.0% 0 |
| 1980 | 49.7% 655 | 40.9% 539 | 9.4% 123 |
| 1976 | 46.7% 551 | 50.7% 598 | 2.6% 31 |
| 1972 | 58.1% 547 | 40.1% 377 | 1.8% 17 |
| 1968 | 47.0% 373 | 47.7% 379 | 5.3% 42 |
| 1964 | 49.9% 328 | 49.8% 327 | 0.3% 2 |
| 1960 | 58.9% 369 | 41.0% 257 | 0.1% 1 |
