= Plymouth, Minnesota =

City in Minnesota, United States

- City
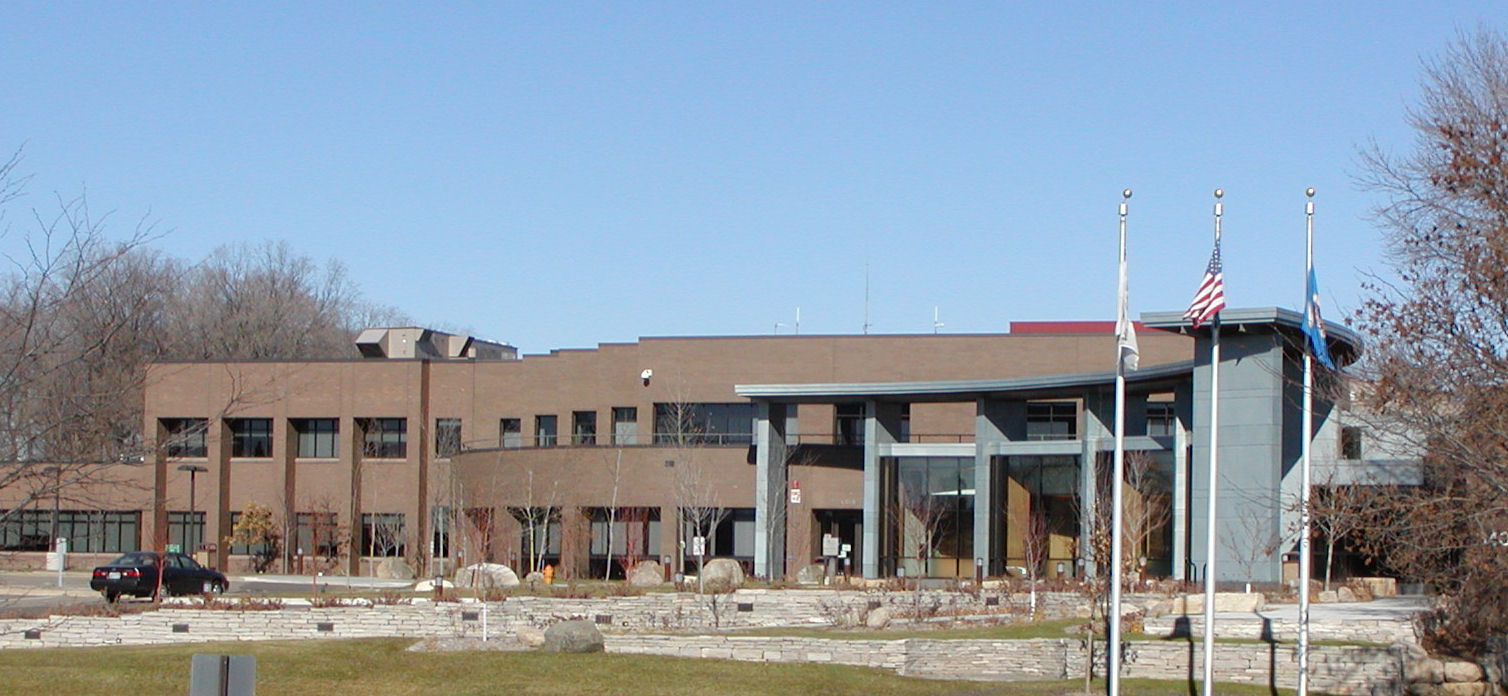
- Plymouth City Hall

- Flag

- Location of Plymouth within Hennepin County, Minnesota
- Coordinates: 45°00′38″N 93°27′20″W
- Country: United States
- State: Minnesota
- County: Hennepin
- Township: 1858
- Incorporated: 1955 (village); 1974 (city)

Government
  - Mayor: Jeffry Wosje

Area
  - City: 35.28 sq mi (91.38 km^{2})
  - Land: 32.71 sq mi (84.72 km^{2})
  - Water: 2.57 sq mi (6.66 km^{2})
- Elevation: 971 ft (296 m)

Population (2020)
  - City: 81,026
  - Estimate (2025): 78,942
  - Rank: US: 462nd MN: 7th
  - Density: 2,477.0/sq mi (956.38/km^{2})
  - Metro: 3,693,729 (US: 16th)
- Time zone: UTC-6 (Central (CST))
  - Summer (DST): UTC-5 (CDT)
- ZIP codes: 55441, 55442, 55446, 55447
- Area code: 763
- FIPS code: 27-51730
- GNIS feature ID: 0649598
- Website: plymouthmn.gov

Plymouth is a city in Hennepin County in the U.S. state of Minnesota. A suburb in the Minneapolis–Saint Paul metropolitan area, the city is about 10 miles (16 km) west of downtown Minneapolis. The population was 81,026 at the 2020 census, making it Minnesota's 7th-largest city.

== History ==
Plymouth's history can be traced to the pre-Columbian period. The original inhabitants were the Dakota. Their encampment was at the north end of Medicine Lake. The name Medicine Lake is derived from the Dakota word Mdewakanton, meaning "Lake of the Spirit." The Dakota named the lake after a warrior who overturned his canoe and his body was never recovered.

Antoine LeCounte, a guide and explorer, was the first settler in this area. He arrived in 1848, but did not settle until 1852. He carried mail from the Red River of the North to points south, trading goods to Native Americans for horses on the way. LeCounte built the first cabin at what is now East Medicine Lake Boulevard at 29th Avenue North.

Plymouth's beginning as a town occurred in 1855 on the northwest shores of what is now known as Parkers Lake. A gristmill and other structures were built in the area. In the spring of 1857, when Parkers Lake flooded, the mill was taken down and moved to Wayzata.

As new settlers arrived in the area, they organized. The Hennepin County Board of Commissioners named the new settlement Plymouth. On April 19, 1858, a group of townspeople met at Francis Day's home to open elections for town offices. On May 11, 1858, the group voted to change the town's name to Medicine Lake. This was used once at the town meeting, but for reasons not recorded, it was never used again.

During the Dakota War of 1862 between white settlers and the Dakota at Fort Ridgely, near New Ulm, the settlers of Plymouth formed a militia. When the Civil War started, Plymouth paid its volunteers $25 to enlist. About this time, schools and churches were built and a post office was in Plymouth. By 1863, hotels were being built, with Medicine Lake becoming a local tourist destination.

By 1880, Plymouth had a population of 1,074. Farming was the city's dominant profession and remained so until the mid-1900s. Roads were built across Plymouth, providing access to other towns.

As the community's character evolved from rural to suburban, so did local government. Plymouth incorporated as a village on May 18, 1955. The city adopted the Council–Manager form of government on August 1, 1968. Plymouth became a statutory city on February 7, 1974. It remained a statutory city until voters made it a home rule charter city by adopting a City Charter on November 3, 1992.

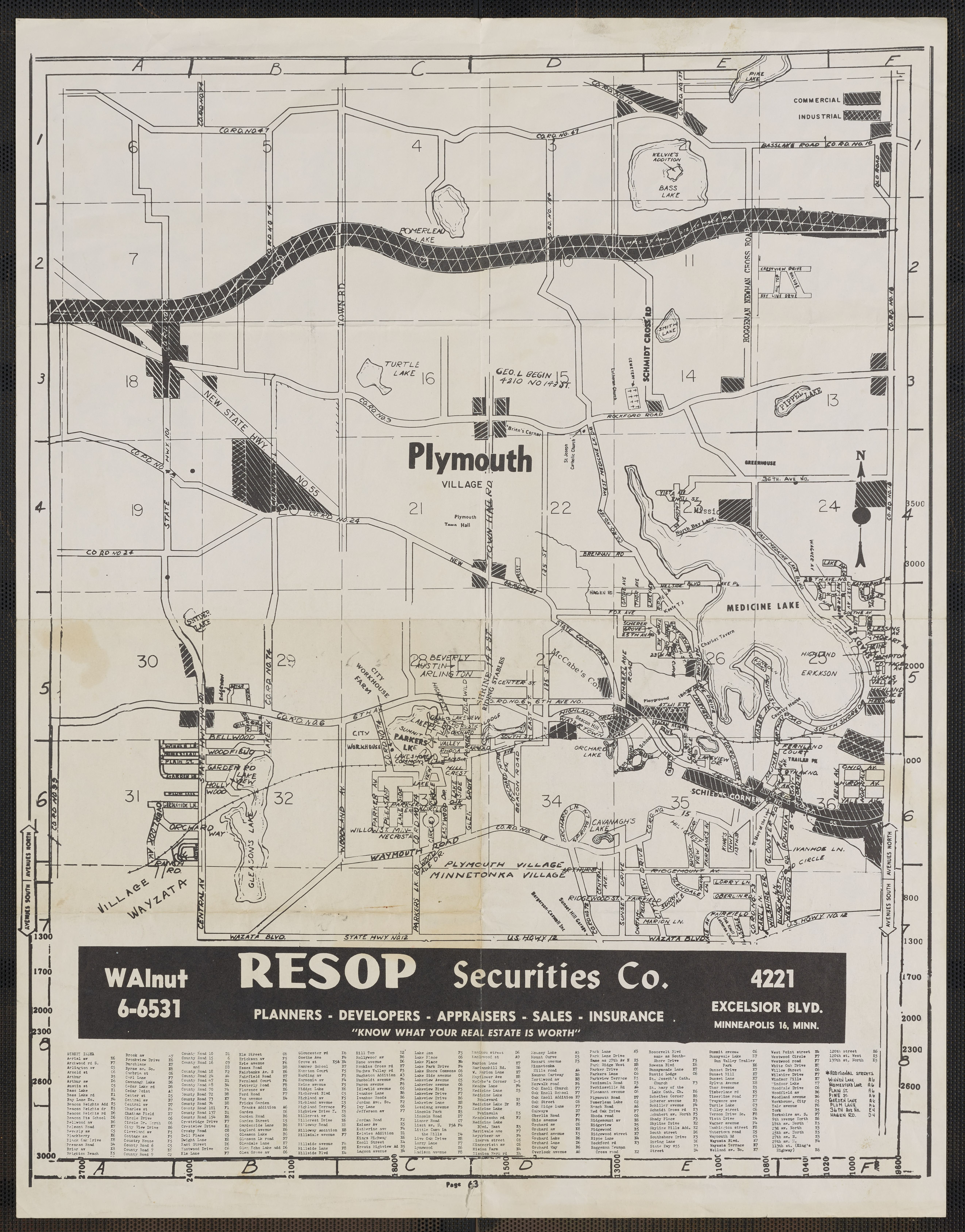
Map of Plymouth as a village circa 1960s.

== Geography ==
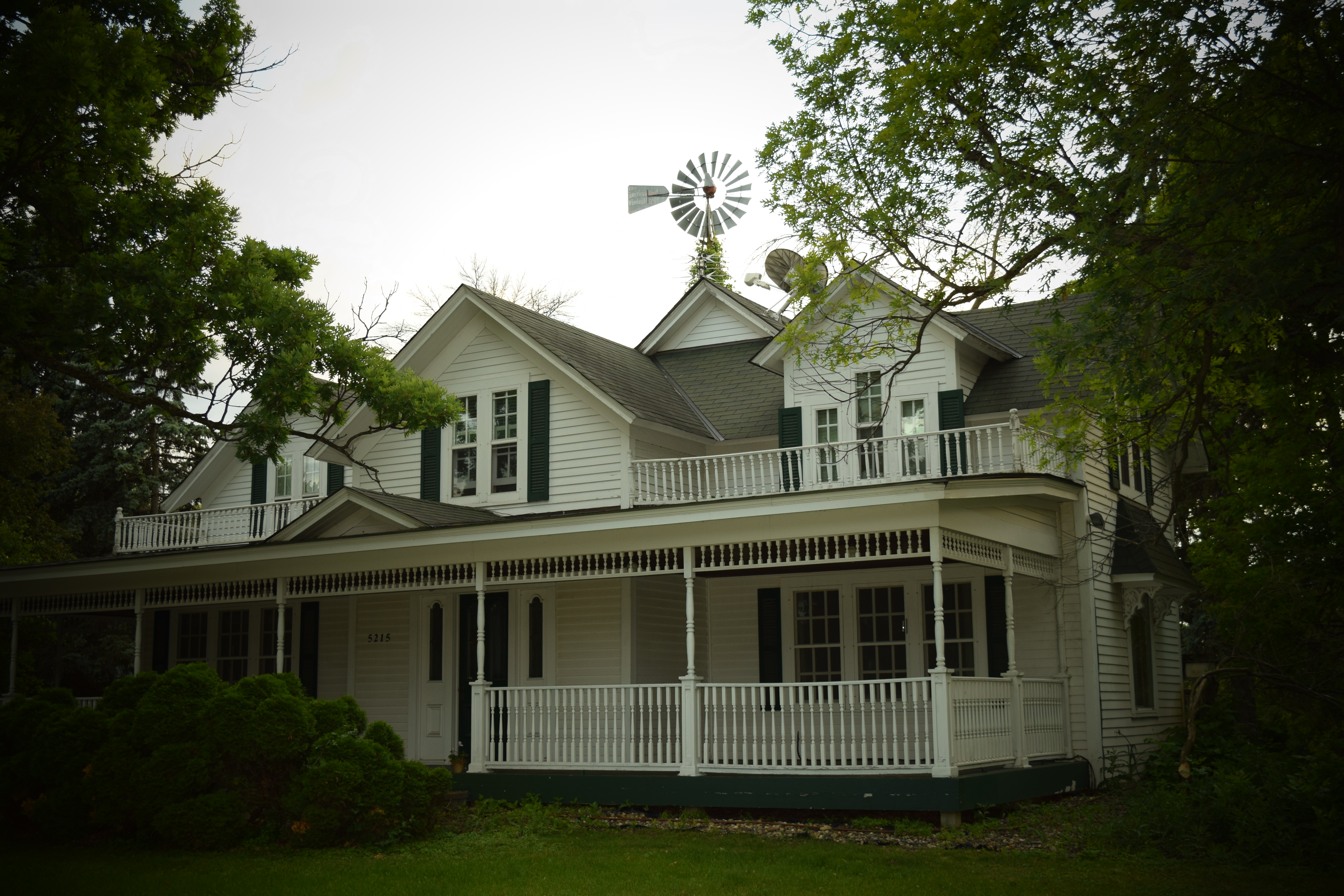
One of the oldest houses in Plymouth MN, built in c. 1883

According to the United States Census Bureau, the city has an area of 35.33 square miles (91.50 km^{2}), of which 32.68 square miles (84.64 km^{2}) is land and 2.65 square miles (6.86 km^{2}) is water.

Interstate 494, U.S. Highway 169, and Minnesota State Highway 55 are three of the main routes in the city. Plymouth has 863 cul-de-sacs and 300 miles of city streets, which are maintained by the city's public works crews.

=== Climate ===
Plymouth has a humid continental climate, typical of the Midwestern United States, with very cold winters, and relatively hot, often humid summer days. Summer daytime temperatures average 83 °F (28 °C), with a low of around 60 °F (15 °C), while winter temperatures average only 23 °F (-5 °C) and a low of 3 °F (-16 °C). The highest recorded temperature in Plymouth was 102 °F (39 °C) in 2012, and the lowest was -39 °F (-39.4 °C) in 1977. Rain falls throughout the year, with the highest concentration falling in the summer months, with June being the rainiest with 120.3 mm of rain.

Climate data for Plymouth, Minnesota
Month	Jan	Feb	Mar	Apr	May	Jun	Jul	Aug	Sep	Oct	Nov	Dec	Year
Record high °F (°C)	55 (13)	59 (15)	83 (28)	92 (33)	95 (35)	102 (39)	99 (37)	96 (36)	96 (36)	87 (31)	73 (23)	61 (16)	102 (39)
Mean daily maximum °F (°C)	23 (−5)	29 (−2)	41 (5)	57 (14)	71 (22)	78 (26)	83 (28)	80 (27)	72 (22)	59 (15)	41 (5)	27 (−3)	55 (13)
Mean daily minimum °F (°C)	3 (−16)	10 (−12)	27 (−3)	34 (1)	47 (8)	56 (13)	60 (16)	58 (14)	49 (9)	37 (3)	24 (−4)	10 (−12)	35 (1)
Record low °F (°C)	−39 (−39)	−58 (−50)	−27 (−33)	−5 (−21)	18 (−8)	33 (1)	42 (6)	36 (2)	22 (−6)	9 (−13)	−19 (−28)	−33 (−36)	−58 (−50)
Average precipitation inches (mm)	0.90 (22.8)	0.66 (16.7)	1.68 (42.6)	2.41 (61.2)	3.54 (89.9)	4.74 (120.3)	4.16 (105.6)	4.02 (102.1)	3.3 (85)	2.50 (63.5)	1.64 (41.6)	0.90 (22.8)	30.45 (774.1)
Source: http://www.weather.com/weather/wxclimatology/monthly/graph/55447?from=tenDay_bottomnav_undeclared

== Demographics ==
Historical population
Census	Pop.	Note	%±
1860	393		—
1870	872		121.9%
1880	1,072		22.9%
1890	1,053		−1.8%
1900	1,164		10.5%
1910	1,221		4.9%
1920	1,275		4.4%
1930	1,683		32.0%
1940	2,989		77.6%
1950	5,813		94.5%
1960	9,576		64.7%
1970	18,077		88.8%
1980	31,615		74.9%
1990	50,889		61.0%
2000	65,894		29.5%
2010	70,576		7.1%
2020	81,026		14.8%
2025 (est.)	78,942		−2.6%
U.S. Decennial Census; 2020 Census

=== 2020 census ===
As of the 2020 census, Plymouth had a population of 81,026. The median age was 39.2 years. 23.6% of residents were under the age of 18 and 16.7% of residents were 65 years of age or older. For every 100 females there were 93.9 males, and for every 100 females age 18 and over there were 90.7 males age 18 and over.

100.0% of residents lived in urban areas, while 0.0% lived in rural areas.

There were 32,041 households in Plymouth, of which 32.4% had children under the age of 18 living in them. Of all households, 56.7% were married-couple households, 13.5% were households with a male householder and no spouse or partner present, and 24.0% were households with a female householder and no spouse or partner present. About 25.2% of all households were made up of individuals and 10.1% had someone living alone who was 65 years of age or older.

There were 33,208 housing units, of which 3.5% were vacant. The homeowner vacancy rate was 0.8% and the rental vacancy rate was 4.6%.

Racial composition as of the 2020 census
Race	Number	Percent
White	60,331	74.5%
Black or African American	5,106	6.3%
American Indian and Alaska Native	251	0.3%
Asian	9,233	11.4%
Native Hawaiian and Other Pacific Islander	27	0.0%
Some other race	1,276	1.6%
Two or more races	4,802	5.9%
Hispanic or Latino (of any race)	3,199	3.9%

=== 2010 census ===
As of the census of 2010, there were 70,576 people, 28,663 households, and 19,230 families living in the city. The population density was 2,159.6 inhabitants per square mile (833.8/km^{2}). There were 29,982 housing units at an average density of 917.4 per square mile (354.2/km^{2}). The city's racial makeup was 84.2% White, 5.2% African American, 0.3% Native American, 6.9% Asian, 1.0% from other races, and 2.3% from two or more races. Hispanic or Latino of any race were 3.0% of the population.

There were 28,663 households, of which 32.4% had children under the age of 18 living with them, 55.6% were married couples living together, 8.5% had a female householder with no husband present, 3.0% had a male householder with no wife present, and 32.9% were non-families. 26.4% of all households were made up of individuals, and 8% had someone living alone who was 65 years of age or older. The average household size was 2.42 and the average family size was 2.96.

The median age in the city was 39.5 years. 23.9% of residents were under the age of 18; 6.9% were between the ages of 18 and 24; 27.1% were from 25 to 44; 30.1% were from 45 to 64; and 12.1% were 65 years of age or older. The gender makeup of the city was 48.4% male and 51.6% female.

=== 2000 census ===
As of the census of 2000, there were 65,894 people, 24,820 households, and 17,647 families living in the city. The population density was 2,002.0 persons per square mile (773.1/km^{2}). There were 25,258 housing units at an average density of 767.4 per square mile (296.3/km^{2}). The racial makeup of the city was 91.36% White, 2.71% African American, 0.33% Native American, 3.79% Asian, 0.01% Pacific Islander, 0.50% from other races, and 1.31% from two or more races. Hispanic or Latino of any race were 1.64% of the population. 27.0% were of German, 13.1% Norwegian, 7.8% Irish and 7.5% Swedish ancestry.

There were 24,820 households, out of which 37.8% had children under the age of 18 living with them, 61.2% were married couples living together, 7.6% had a female householder with no husband present, and 28.9% were non-families. 21.8% of all households were made up of individuals, and 4.7% had someone living alone who was 65 years of age or older. The average household size was 2.60 and the average family size was 3.09.

In the city, the population was spread out, with 27.1% under the age of 18, 7.4% from 18 to 24, 33.0% from 25 to 44, 25.0% from 45 to 64, and 7.6% who were 65 years of age or older. The median age was 36 years. For every 100 females, there were 97.1 males. For every 100 females age 18 and over, there were 95.5 males.

The median income for a household in the city was $77,008, and the median income for a family was $90,134. Males had a median income of $59,751 versus $38,111 for females. The city's per capita income was $36,309. About 1.5% of families and 2.6% of the population were below the poverty line, including 2.0% of those under age 18 and 1.5% of those age 65 or over.

== Government and politics ==
Plymouth operates under a council-manager form of government that comprises a mayor and six council members.

Plymouth is in two Minnesota Senate districts, represented by state senators Ann Johnson Stewart and Ron Latz. Plymouth's state representatives are Ryan Winkler, Ginny Klevorn, and Patty Acomb. Plymouth is in Minnesota's 3rd congressional district, represented by Kelly Morrison.

Plymouth Election results from statewide races
Year	Office	Results
2024	President	Harris 62.5% (30,341) – 34.6% (16,809)
2020	President	Biden 61.95 – 35.88%
2020	U.S. Senator	Smith 56.63 – 37.94%
2020	U.S. Representative	Phillips 57.97 – 41.98%
2018	Governor	Walz 56.47 – 40.92%
2018	U.S. Senator	Klobuchar 65.00 – 32.86%
2018	U.S. Senator	Smith 56.31 – 40.53%
2018	U.S. Representative	Phillips 57.77 – 42.06%
2016	President	Clinton 53.32 – 37.74%
2016	U.S. Representative	Paulsen 53.85 – 45.89%
2014	Governor	Johnson 49.59 – 47.08%
2014	U.S. Senator	Franken 49.59 – 48.04%
2014	U.S. Representative	Paulsen 61.68 – 38.22%
2012	President	Obama 50.07 – 48.13%
2012	U.S. Senator	Klobuchar 63.33 – 34.05%
2012	U.S. Representative	Paulsen 57.92 – 41.97%
2012	Amendment 1	No 59.40 – 40.60%
2010	Governor	Emmer 48.25 – 37.19 – 14.05%
2010	U.S. Representative	Paulsen 60.00 – 35.90%
2008	President	Obama 52.10 – 46.44%
2008	U.S. Senator	Coleman 48.53 – 37.11 – 13.73%
2008	U.S. Representative	Paulsen 49.92 – 40.15 – 9.83%
2006	Governor	Pawlenty 54.99 – 38.16 – 6.19%
2006	U.S. Senator	Klobuchar 55.17 – 41.83%
2006	U.S. Representative	Ramstad 68.94 – 30.96%
2004	President	Bush 51.90 – 47.17%
2004	U.S. Representative	Ramstad 67.61 – 32.32%
2002	Governor	Pawlenty 52.71 – 30.84% – 14.59%
2002	U.S. Senator	Coleman 59.10 – 38.96%
2002	U.S. Representative	Ramstad 76.78 – 23.15%
2000	President	Bush 51.60 – 44.27%
2000	U.S. Senator	Grams 48.59 – 43.48 –6.67%
2000	U.S. Representative	Ramstad 72.23 – 25.78%

== Education ==
=== Public schools ===
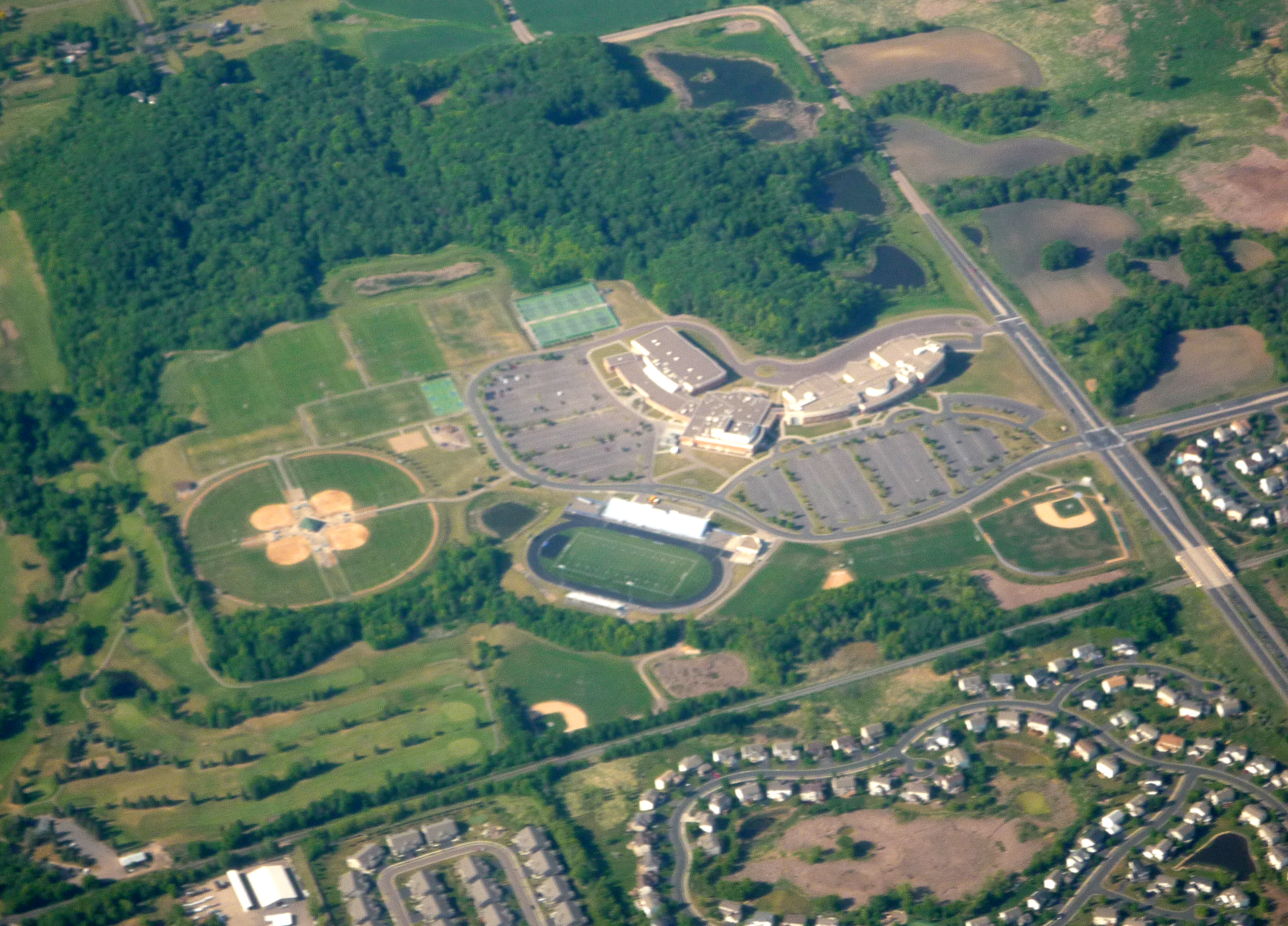
Wayzata High School

Five school districts serve Plymouth: Wayzata Public Schools (ISD 284), Robbinsdale Area Schools (ISD 281), Osseo School District (279), West Metro Education Program (ISD 6069) and Hopkins School District (ISD 270). Most of the city, particularly the western, northwestern, and southern areas, is served by Wayzata Public Schools. Robbinsdale Area Schools serves the east-central area. The Osseo District includes the northeast area and Hopkins includes the southeast corner. Some students attend public schools in other school districts their families choose under Minnesota's open enrollment statute.

List of Wayzata Public Schools located in Plymouth:

- Birchview Elementary School
- Gleason Lake Elementary School
- Greenwood Elementary School
- Kimberly Lane Elementary School
- Meadow Ridge Elementary School
- North Woods Elementary School
- Oakwood Elementary School
- Plymouth Creek Elementary School
- Sunset Hill Elementary School
- Wayzata East Middle School
- Wayzata Central Middle School
- Wayzata H.S.

Wayzata High School, operated by the Wayzata School District, has approximately 3,500 students in grades 9 to 12, making it Minnesota's largest secondary school by enrollment. The school is part of the Lake Conference. In 2008, Newsweek ranked the school 940th on its "List of the 1300 Top High Schools in America."

List of Robbinsdale School District schools:

- Robbinsdale Armstrong High School
- Robbinsdale Plymouth Middle School
- Fair School Pilgrim Lane
- Zachary Lane Elementary School

List of West Metro Education Program (WMEP) District 6069 schools:

- The InterDistrict Downtown School (IDDS)
- FAIR (Fine Arts Interdisciplinary Resource) School

=== Private schools and colleges ===
- Free Lutheran Bible College and Seminary
- Fourth Baptist Christian School
- Central Baptist Theological Seminary
- Providence Academy
- West Lutheran High School

== Economy ==
The corporate headquarters for OneBeacon, Select Comfort, Christopher & Banks, and Tonka Water are located in Plymouth.

=== List of principal employers ===
#	Employer	# of Employees
1	Zayo Group	3,500
2	I.S.D. No. 284 (Wayzata)	2,529
3	Medtronic	1,168
4	City of Plymouth	830
5	US Foods	700
6	Meritain Health	600
7	Life Time Fitness	325
8	Target	301
9	TURCK Inc.	300
9	Polaris	300

Source: 2023 Annual Comprehensive Financial Report

== Notable people ==
- Dominique Barber - former NFL safety
- Marion Barber III – former NFL running back
- Rudy Boschwitz – U.S. senator who lived in Plymouth
- Dani Cameranesi – Olympic Gold Medalist
- Ariya Daivari – professional wrestler
- Jonas H. Howe – abolitionist, artist, and state legislator
- Jeff Johnson – Hennepin County Commissioner
- Evan Kaufmann (born 1984) – professional ice hockey player
- Amy Klobuchar – U.S. senator for Minnesota and the Governor Elect of Minnesota
- James Laurinaitis – NFL linebacker
- Adrianne Lenker - singer/songwriter and lead vocalist of Big Thief
- Kelly Pannek - professional ice hockey player, two-time Olympic Gold medalist (2018 and 2026), and two-time Walter Cup champion (2024 and 2025).
- Mark Parrish – former NHL All Star player
- Dean Phillips – former U.S. representative
- Rem Pitlick – NHL player
- Andrew Tang – chess grandmaster
- A.J. Tarpley – NFL linebacker
- Blake Wheeler – NHL player
