= Hennepin County, Minnesota =

County in Minnesota, United States

- County
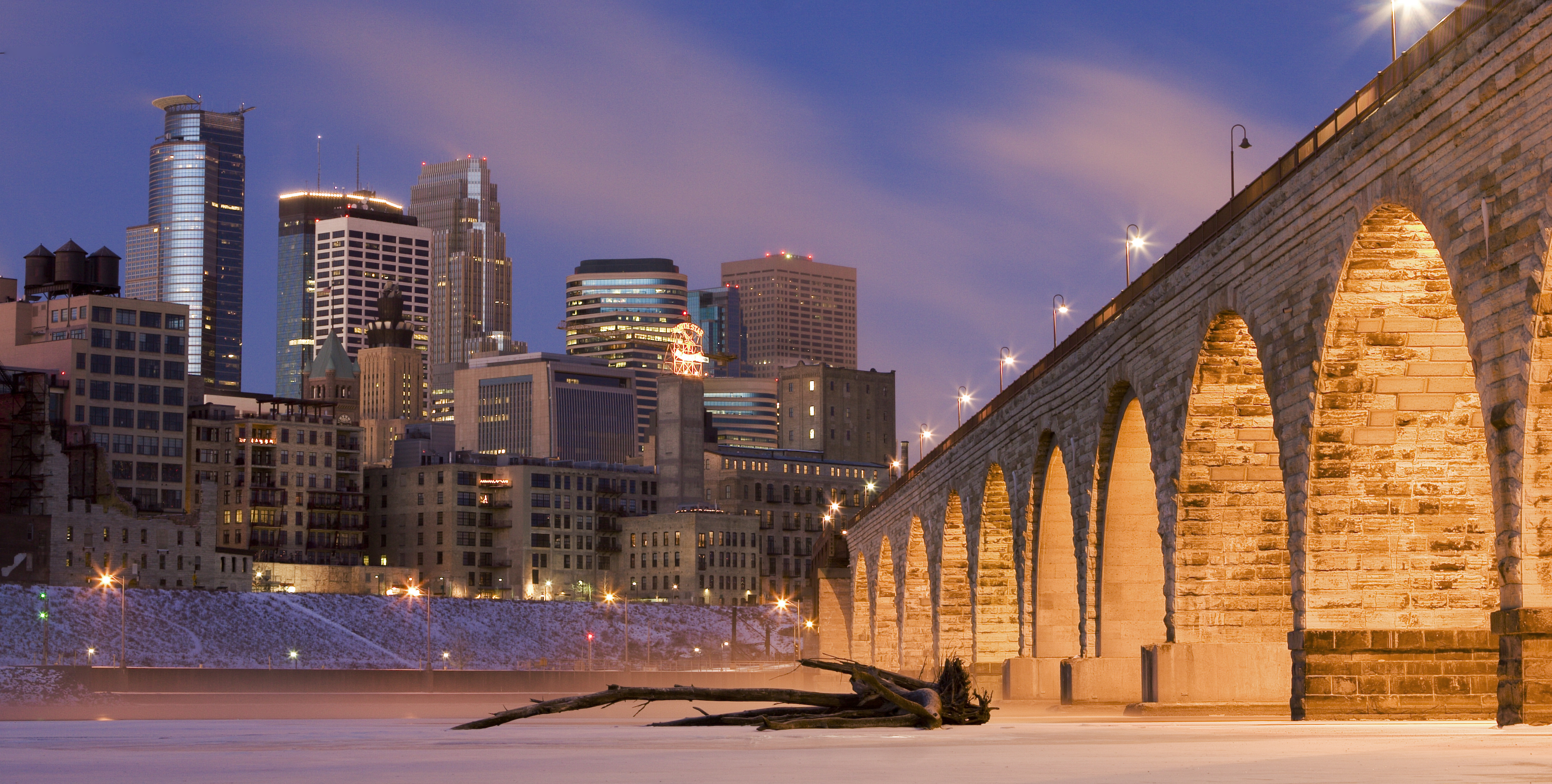
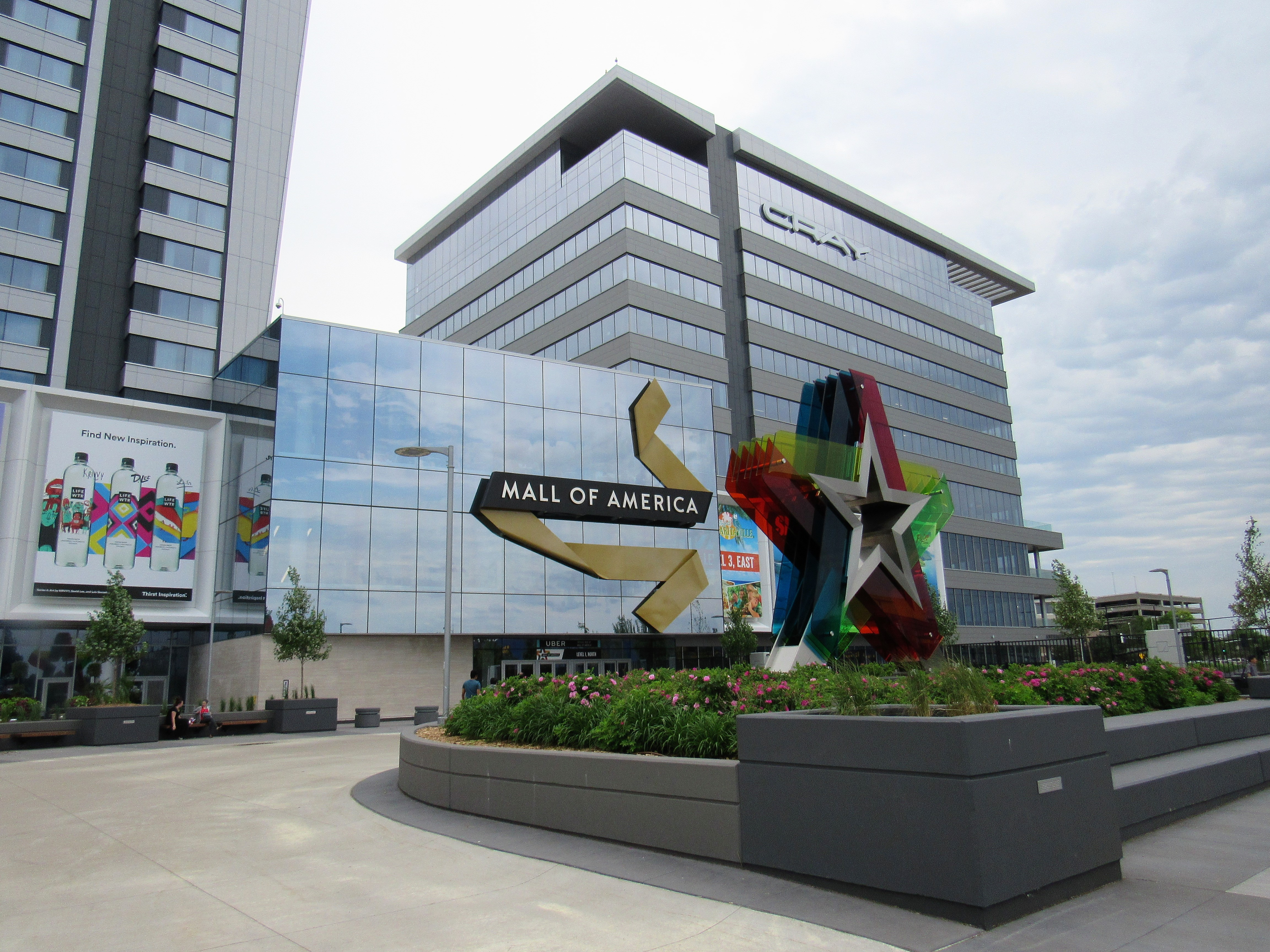
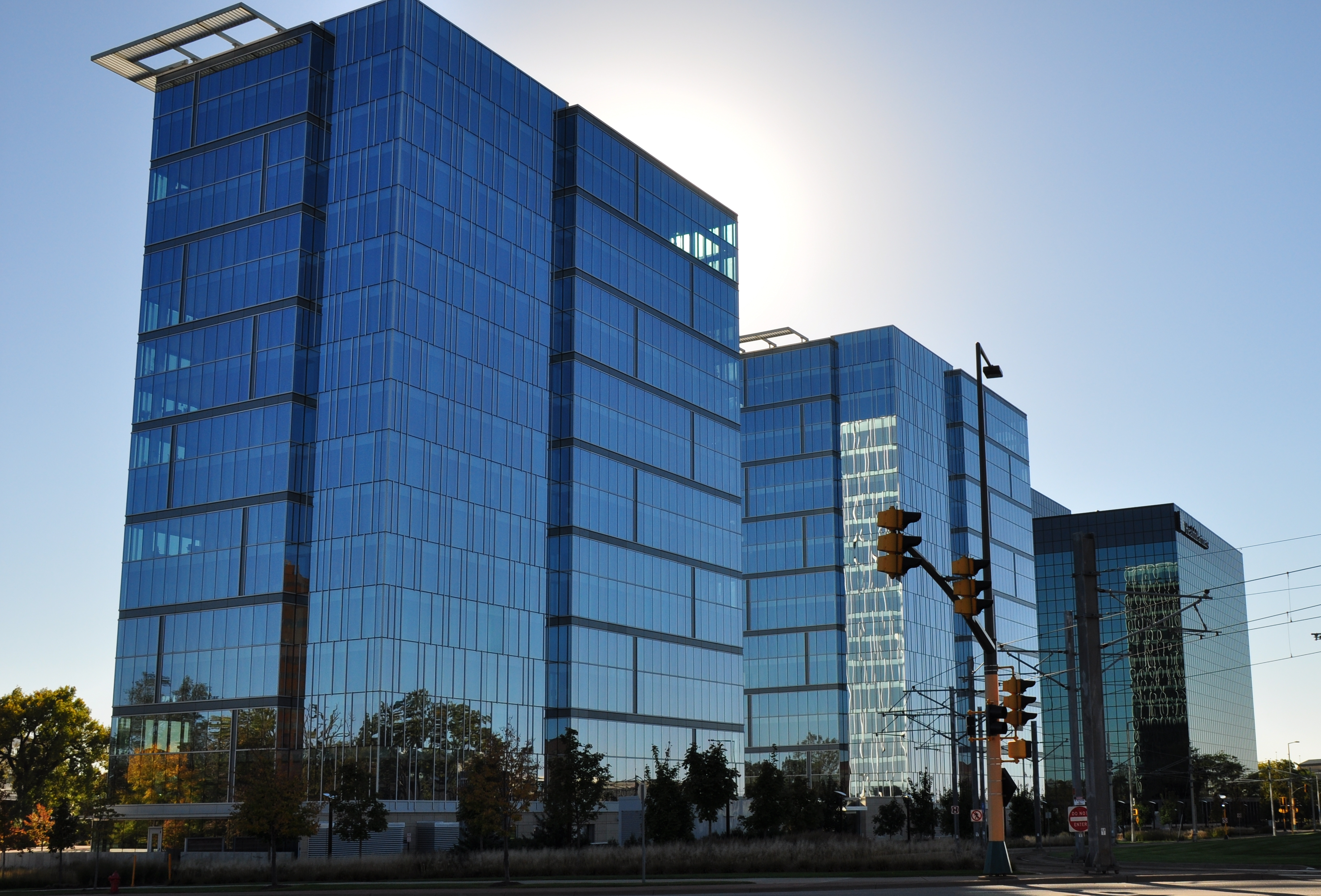
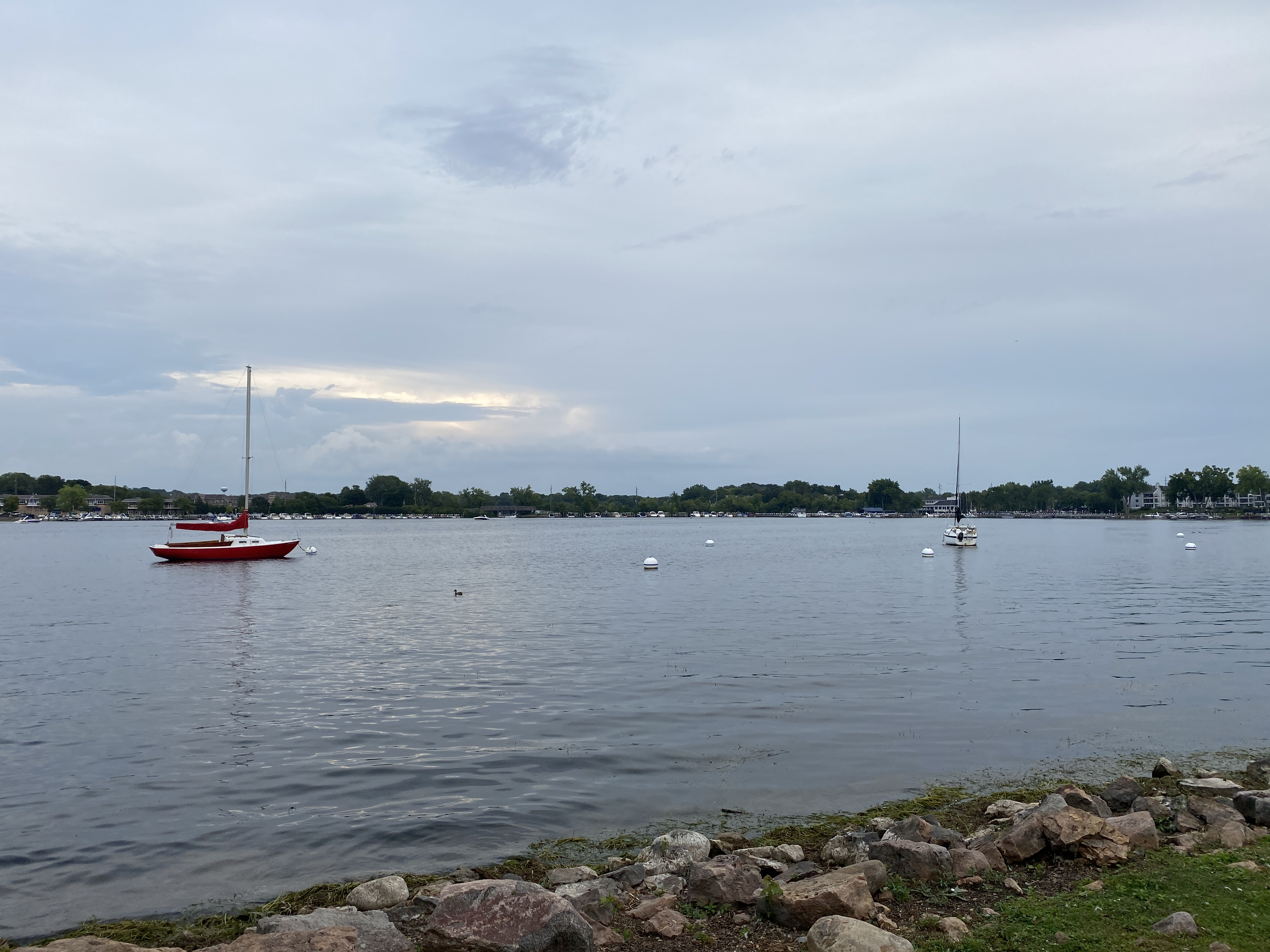
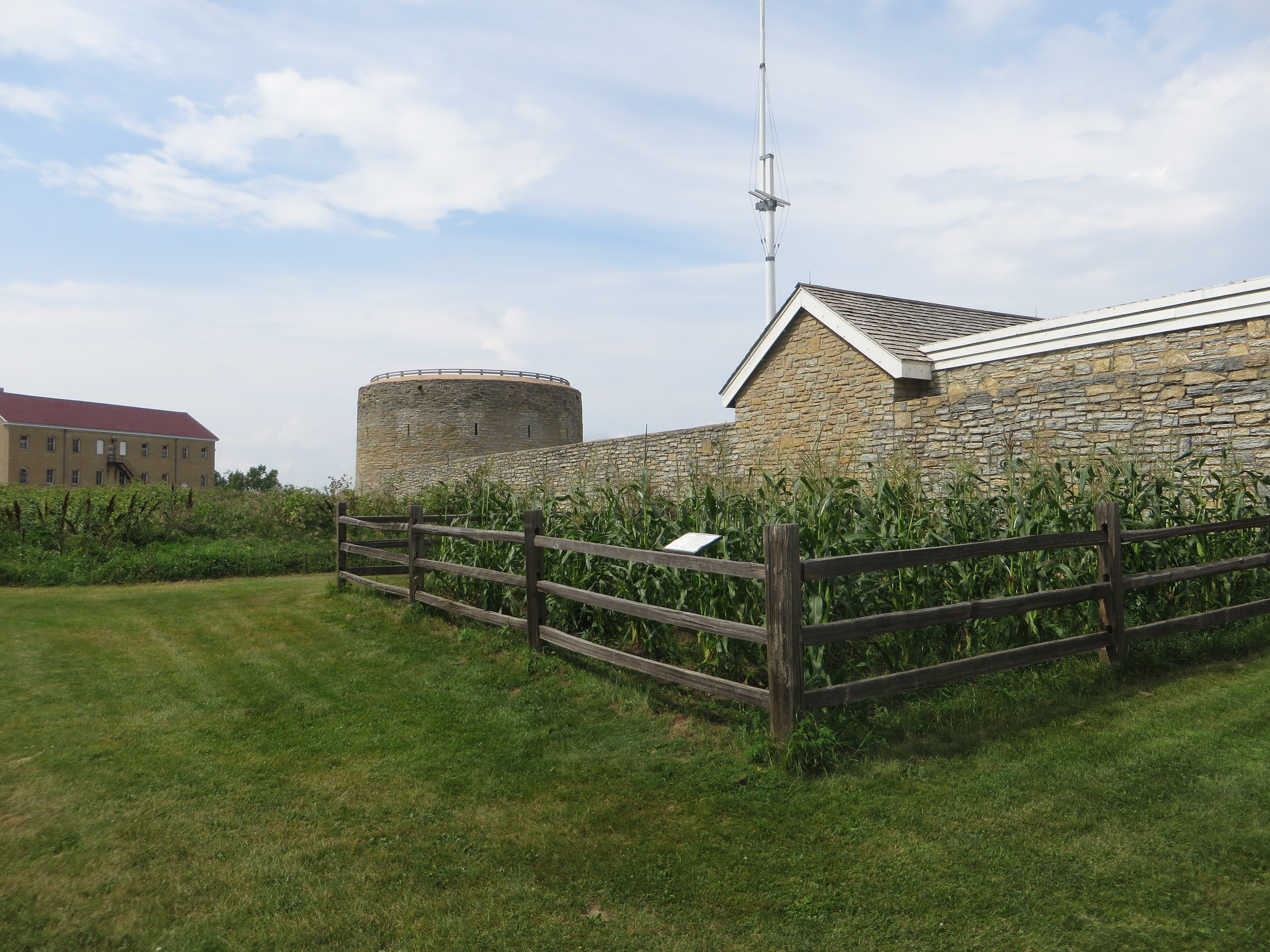
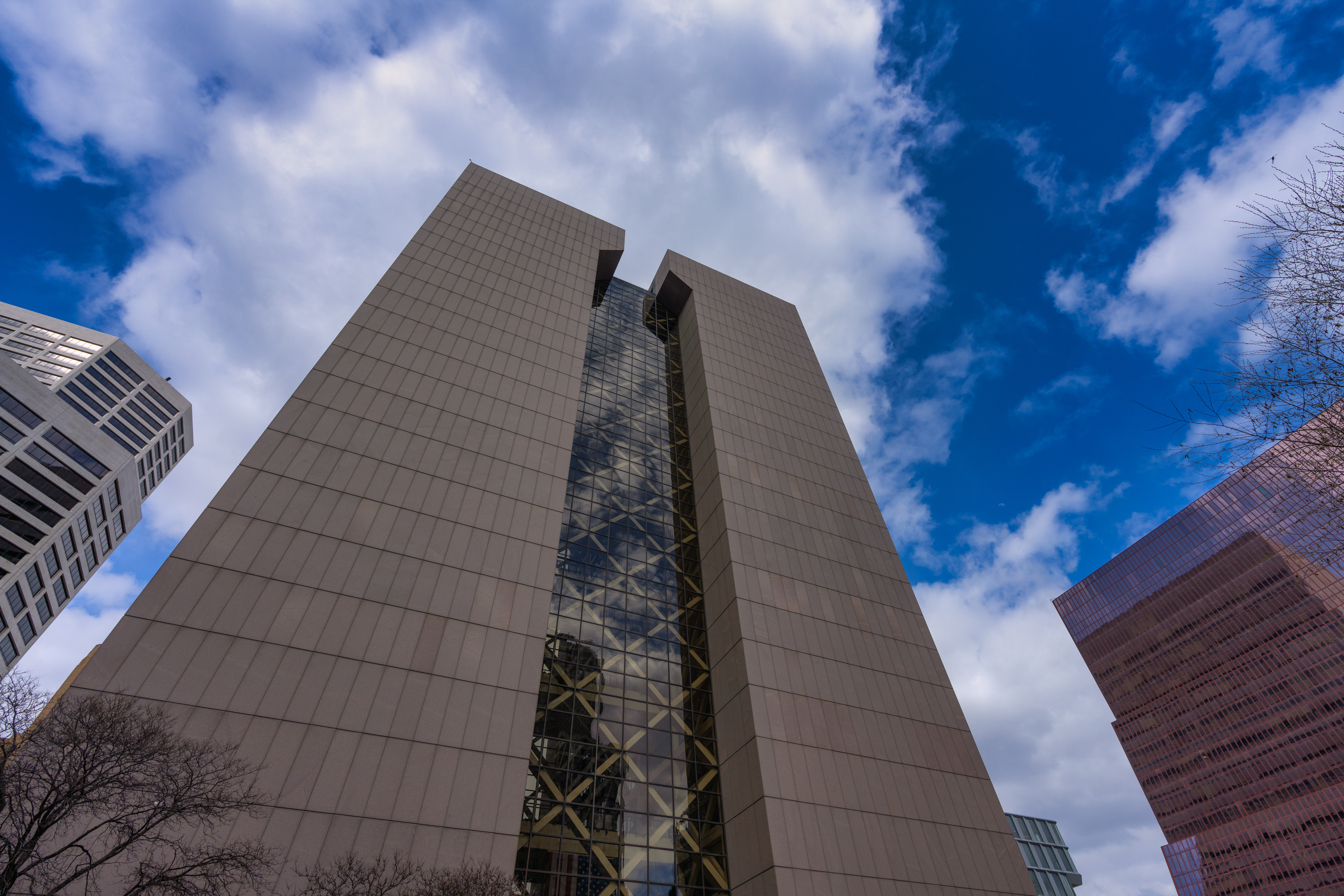
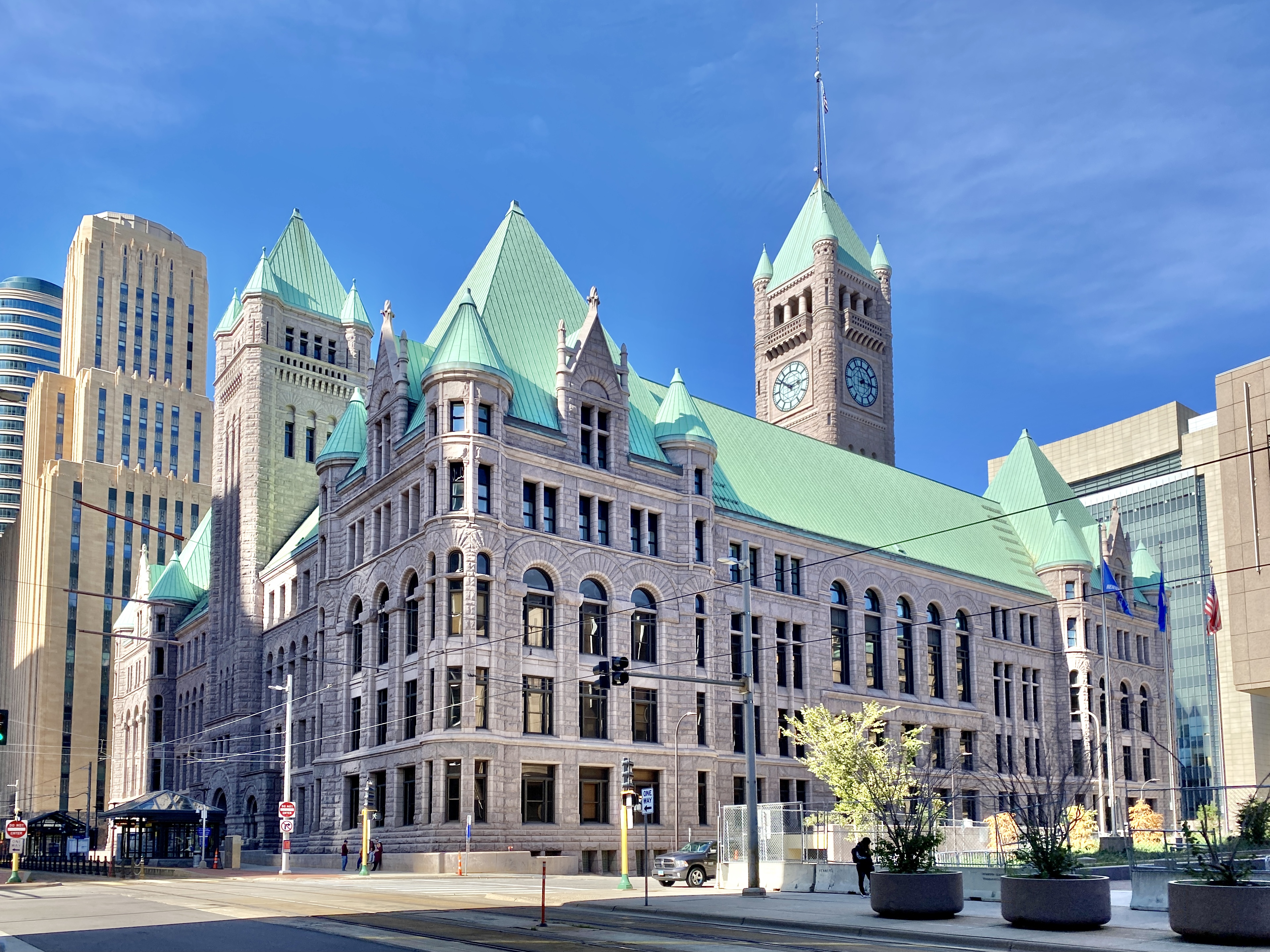
- Minneapolis Mall of America Bloomington Lake Minnetonka in Excelsior Fort Snelling Hennepin County Government Center, see the stylized "H." Minneapolis City Hall and Hennepin Co. Courthouse

- Flag Logo

- Location within the U.S. state of Minnesota
- Coordinates: 45.006121°N 93.475228°W
- Country: United States
- State: Minnesota
- Founded: March 6, 1852
- Named for: Louis Hennepin
- Seat: Minneapolis
- Largest city: Minneapolis

Area
  - Total: 606.749 sq mi (1,571.47 km^{2})
  - Land: 554.019 sq mi (1,434.90 km^{2})
  - Water: 52.730 sq mi (136.57 km^{2}) 8.69%

Population (2020)
  - Total: 1,281,565
  - Estimate (2025): 1,284,784 ▲
  - Density: 2,298.355/sq mi (887.400/km^{2})

GDP
  - Total: $193.617 billion (2024)
- Time zone: UTC−6 (Central)
  - Summer (DST): UTC−5 (CDT)
- Area code: 612, 763, 952
- Congressional districts: 3rd, 5th, 6th
- Website: www.hennepincounty.gov

Hennepin County (/ˈhɛnəpɪn/ HEN-ə-pin) is a county in the U.S. state of Minnesota. As of the 2020 census, the population was 1,281,565, and was estimated to be 1,284,784 in 2025, making it the most populous county in Minnesota and the 34th-most populous county in the United States. Its county seat is Minneapolis, the most populous city in Minnesota and the 46th-most populous city in the United States. The county is named for the 17th-century explorer Louis Hennepin. It extends from Minneapolis to the suburbs and outlying cities in the western part of the county. Its natural areas are covered by extensive woods, hills, and lakes. It contains over 21.98% of the state's population. It is included in the Minneapolis–Saint Paul–Bloomington metropolitan statistical area.

== History ==
=== 19th century ===
The Territorial Legislature of Minnesota established Hennepin County on March 6, 1852, and two years later Minneapolis was named the county seat. Louis Hennepin's name was chosen because he originally named Saint Anthony Falls and recorded some of the earliest accounts of the area for the Western world. In January 1855, the first bridge over the Mississippi River was built over St. Anthony Falls.

Waterpower built the city of Minneapolis and Hennepin County. The water of streams and rivers provided power to grist mills and sawmills throughout the county. By the late 1860s, more than a dozen mills were churning out lumber near St. Anthony Falls and the county's population had surpassed 12,000.

The falls' power was the vital link between the central city and the farmsteads throughout the county. Farms produced vegetables, fruits, grains and dairy products for city dwellers, while Minneapolis industries produced lumber, furniture, farm implements and clothing.

By 1883, railroads united Minneapolis with both the East and West coasts, and technical developments, especially in flour milling, brought rapid progress to the area. The major Minneapolis millers were Washburn, Pillsbury, Bell, Dunwoody and Crosby.

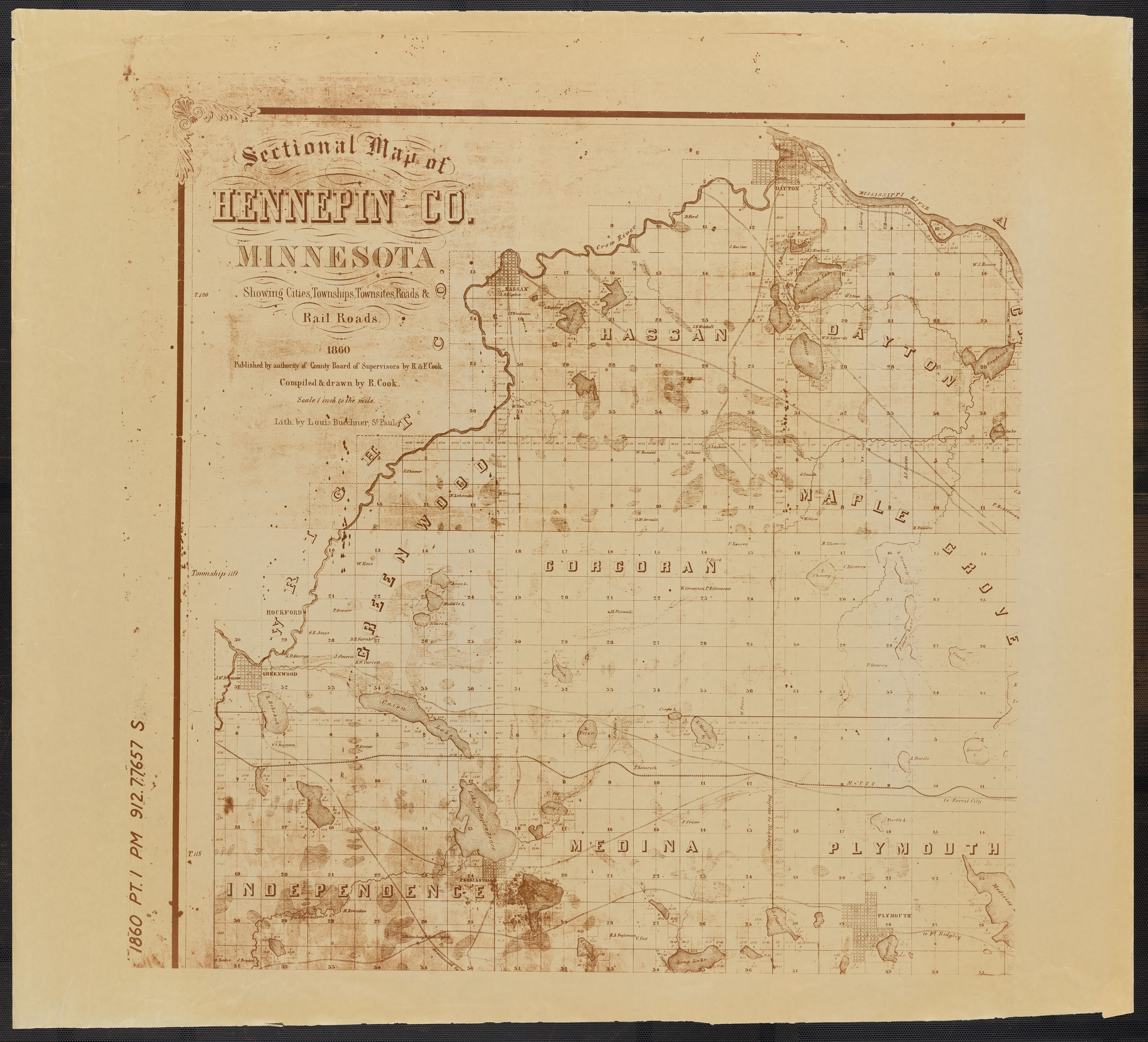
Map of Hennepin County, 1860.

=== 20th century ===
For a decade, the "Mill City" was the flour-milling capital of the world and one of the largest lumber producers. Minneapolis, with a population of 165,000 by 1890, had become a major U.S. city, and by 1900, was firmly established as the hub of the Upper Midwest's industry and commerce.

In March 1915, Minnesota counties were given the right to choose whether to allow alcohol sales. Votes in Hennepin County were cast in October, and the county became a wet county by a margin of 9,000 votes. Temperance activists, including the Anti-Saloon League, alleged electoral fraud.

Hennepin County's farm economy was also substantial. In 1910, farmland in the county totaled 284,000 acres, about 72% of its area. The principal crops were wheat, corn, garden vegetables, and apples. The number of acres in production remained high for the next 30 years. By 1950, the amount of land devoted to agriculture had declined to 132,000 acres as development progressed in the suburbs.

During the 1950s and 1960s, many suburbs grew rapidly as housing developments, shopping centers, large school systems and growing industrialization replaced much of the open farmland. By 1970, Hennepin County's suburban population outnumbered the cities for the first time. Minneapolis's population declined by 10 percent from 1960 to 1970, while the suburban population grew by nearly 50 percent.

Another wave of immigration—which began after the Vietnam War in the mid-1970s—marked a major change in the county's ethnic makeup. This wave peaked in the 1980s when hundreds of refugees from Southeast Asia, often aided by local churches, resettled in Hennepin County. Its population surpassed one million in 1989.

== Geography ==
Soils of Hennepin County

According to the United States Census Bureau, the county has a total area of 606.749 square miles (1,571.47 km^{2}), of which 554.019 square miles (1,434.90 km^{2}) is land and 52.730 square miles (136.57 km^{2}) (8.69%) is water. It is the 60th largest county in Minnesota by total area.

Hennepin is one of 17 Minnesota counties with more savanna soils than either prairie or forest soils, and one of two Minnesota counties with more than 75% of its area in savanna soils (the other is the adjacent Wright County).

The highest waterfall on the Mississippi River, Saint Anthony Falls (discovered by Louis Hennepin), is in Hennepin County next to downtown Minneapolis, but in the 19th century, the falls were converted to a series of dams. Barges and boats now pass through locks to move between the parts of the river above and below the dams.

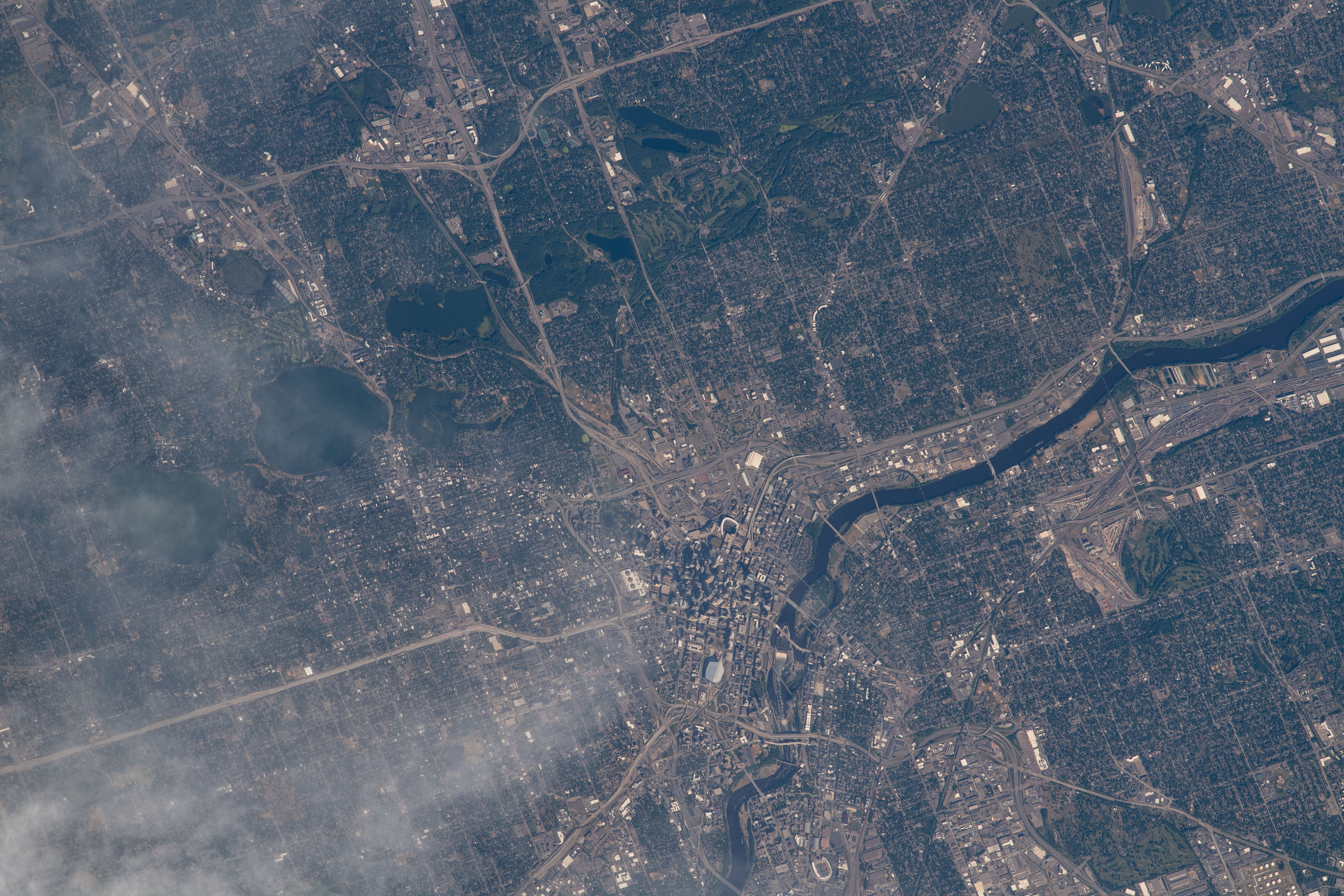
Part of central and eastern Hennepin County on July 1, 2022, taken from the International Space Station. North is oriented mostly towards the right and somewhat up. The border between Anoka and Hennepin counties is visible along and near the Mississippi River.

=== Adjacent counties ===
- Anoka County (northeast)
- Ramsey County (east)
- Dakota County (southeast)
- Scott County (south)
- Carver County (southwest)
- Wright County (northwest)
- Sherburne County (north)

=== National protected areas ===
- Minnesota Valley National Wildlife Refuge (part)
- Mississippi National River and Recreation Area (part)

== Demographics ==
Historical population
Census	Pop.	Note	%±
1860	12,849		—
1870	31,566		145.7%
1880	67,013		112.3%
1890	185,294		176.5%
1900	228,340		23.2%
1910	333,480		46.0%
1920	415,419		24.6%
1930	517,785		24.6%
1940	568,899		9.9%
1950	676,579		18.9%
1960	842,854		24.6%
1970	960,080		13.9%
1980	941,411		−1.9%
1990	1,032,431		9.7%
2000	1,116,200		8.1%
2010	1,152,425		3.2%
2020	1,281,565		11.2%
2025 (est.)	1,284,784	▲	0.3%
U.S. Decennial Census; 1790–1960 1900–1990; 1990–2000 2010–2020

As of the third quarter of 2024, the median home value in Hennepin County was $398,850.

As of the 2023 American Community Survey, there are 534,573 estimated households in Hennepin County with an average of 2.32 persons per household. The county has a median household income of $96,339. Approximately 10.1% of the county's population lives at or below the poverty line. Hennepin County has an estimated 71.4% employment rate, with 53.3% of the population holding a bachelor's degree or higher and 94.0% holding a high school diploma.

The top five reported ancestries (people were allowed to report up to two ancestries, thus the figures will generally add to more than 100%) were English (82.3%), Spanish (6.0%), Indo-European (2.9%), Asian and Pacific Islander (4.3%), and Other (4.5%).

=== Racial and ethnic composition ===
Hennepin County's racial and ethnic composition has evolved significantly over time. Initially, the region was inhabited by Native American tribes, primarily the Dakota Sioux. Beginning in the early 19th century, European settlement brought a demographic shift, with a predominantly white population of Northern European descent. The county witnessed further diversification throughout the 20th century with the arrival of African Americans during the Great Migration, as well as Latino, Asian, and other immigrant groups in the latter half of the century.

Hennepin County, Minnesota – racial and ethnic composition
Note: the US Census treats Hispanic/Latino as an ethnic category. This table excludes Latinos from the racial categories and assigns them to a separate category. Hispanics/Latinos may be of any race.

Race / ethnicity (NH = non-Hispanic)	Pop. 1980	Pop. 1990	Pop. 2000	Pop. 2010	Pop. 2020
White alone (NH)	875,692 (93.02%)	914,870 (88.61%)	881,016 (78.93%)	826,670 (71.73%)	840,845 (65.61%)
Black or African American alone (NH)	32,522 (3.45%)	59,109 (5.73%)	98,698 (8.84%)	134,240 (11.65%)	169,603 (13.23%)
Native American or Alaska Native alone (NH)	10,479 (1.11%)	14,272 (1.38%)	10,212 (0.91%)	8,848 (0.77%)	8,016 (0.63%)
Asian alone (NH)	9,839 (1.05%)	29,010 (2.81%)	53,229 (4.77%)	71,535 (6.21%)	97,348 (7.60%)
Pacific Islander alone (NH)	—	—	473 (0.04%)	431 (0.04%)	388 (0.03%)
Other race alone (NH)	4,852 (0.52%)	1,192 (0.12%)	2,115 (0.19%)	2,321 (0.20%)	6,127 (0.48%)
Mixed race or multiracial (NH)	—	—	25,018 (2.24%)	30,704 (2.66%)	60,988 (4.76%)
Hispanic or Latino (any race)	8,027 (0.85%)	13,978 (1.35%)	45,439 (4.07%)	77,676 (6.74%)	98,250 (7.67%)
Total	941,411 (100.00%)	1,032,431 (100.00%)	1,116,200 (100.00%)	1,152,425 (100.00%)	1,281,565 (100.00%)

=== Ancestry ===
The most common ancestries in Hennepin County are German, Irish, English, Norwegian and Swedish.

Ancestry	Any ancestry (Note: Any ancestry includes individuals identifying with either a single ethnic group (full ancestry) or with a mixed heritage from multiple groups (partial ancestry).)			Full ancestry (Note: Full ancestry only includes those who identify with a single group, without any mixed heritage.)		
Ancestry	Rank	Population	Percentage	Rank	Population	Percentage
German	1	347,042	27.08%	1	98,811	7.71%
Irish	2	187,435	14.63%	6	31,653	2.47%
English	3	152,567	11.09%	3	40,602	3.17%
Norwegian	4	135,077	10.54%	5	32,327	2.52%
Swedish	5	100,544	7.85%	9	18,886	1.47%
African	6	75,484	5.89%	2	60,478	—
Mexican	7	57,607	4.50%	—	—	—
Polish	8	54,025	4.22%	11	10,306	0.80%
French	9	52,883	4.13%	16	4,467	0.35%
Somali	10	38,588	3.01%	4	37,897	2.96%

=== 2023 estimate ===
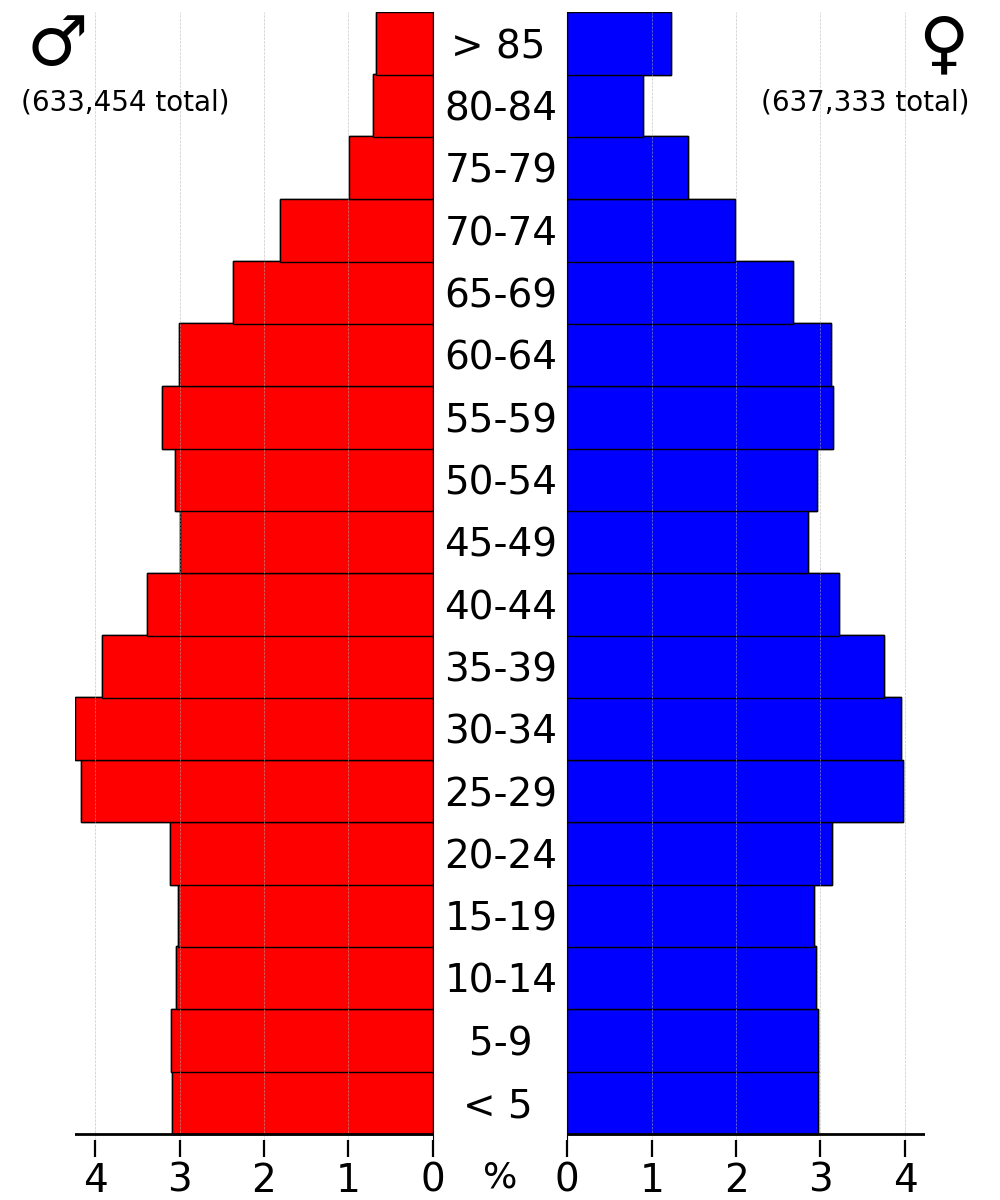
2022 US Census population pyramid for Hennepin County, from ACS 5-year estimates

As of the 2023 estimate, there were 1,258,713 people and 534,573 households residing in the county. There were 579,806 housing units. The racial makeup of the county was 72.9% White (66.5% NH White), 14.7% African American, 1.2% Native American, 7.6% Asian, 0.1% Pacific Islander, _% from some other races and 3.6% from two or more races (% NH Multiracial). Hispanic or Latino people of any race were 7.9% of the population.

In the 2021 estimate, Hennepin County is the 2nd wealthiest county in Minnesota and 65th wealthiest county of the 100 highest-income counties in the United States. $50,478 for per capita income in 2021.

=== 2020 census ===
As of the 2020 census, the county had a population of 1,281,565. The median age was 36.5 years. 21.3% of residents were under the age of 18 and 14.8% of residents were 65 years of age or older. For every 100 females there were 97.5 males, and for every 100 females age 18 and over there were 95.7 males age 18 and over.

The racial makeup of the county was 66.7% White, 13.4% Black or African American, 0.9% American Indian and Alaska Native, 7.6% Asian, <0.1% Native Hawaiian and Pacific Islander, 4.2% from some other race, and 7.1% from two or more races. Hispanic or Latino residents of any race comprised 7.7% of the population.

97.6% of residents lived in urban areas, while 2.4% lived in rural areas.

There were 528,547 households in the county, of which 26.5% had children under the age of 18 living in them. Of all households, 42.4% were married-couple households, 21.1% were households with a male householder and no spouse or partner present, and 28.4% were households with a female householder and no spouse or partner present. About 32.7% of all households were made up of individuals and 10.8% had someone living alone who was 65 years of age or older.

There were 555,779 housing units, of which 4.9% were vacant. Among occupied housing units, 60.1% were owner-occupied and 39.9% were renter-occupied. The homeowner vacancy rate was 0.9% and the rental vacancy rate was 5.5%.

=== 2010 census ===
As of the 2010 census, there were 1,152,425 people, 475,913 households, and 272,885 families residing in the county. The population density was 2,081.7 inhabitants per square mile (803.7/km^{2}). There were 509,458 housing units at an average density of 920.3 per square mile (355.3/km^{2}). The racial makeup of the county was 74.35% White, 11.82% African American, 0.92% Native American, 6.24% Asian, 0.04% Pacific Islander, 3.37% from some other races and 3.25% from two or more races. Hispanic or Latino people of any race were 6.74% of the population.

=== 2000 census ===
As of the 2000 census, there were 1,116,200 people, 456,129 households, and 267,291 families residing in the county. The population density was 774.0 inhabitants per square mile (298.8/km^{2}). There were 468,824 housing units at an average density of 325.0 per square mile (125.5/km^{2}). The racial makeup of the county was 80.53% White, 8.95% African American, 1.00% Native American, 4.80% Asian, 0.05% Pacific Islander, 2.06% from some other races and 2.60% from two or more races. Hispanic or Latino people of any race were 4.07% of the population.

There were 456,129 households out of which 28.80% had children under the age of 18 living with them, 45.30% were married couples living together, 9.90% had a female householder with no husband present, and 41.40% were non-families. 31.80% of all households were made up of individuals and 8.40% had someone living alone who was 65 years of age or older. The average household size was 2.39 and the average family size was 3.07.

In the county the population was spread out with 24.00% under the age of 18, 9.70% from 18 to 24, 33.70% from 25 to 44, 21.70% from 45 to 64, and 11.00% who were 65 years of age or older. The median age was 35 years. For every 100 females there were 97.00 males. For every 100 females age 18 and over, there were 94.70 males.

The median income for a household in the county was $51,711, and the median income for a family was $65,985. Males had a median income of $42,466 versus $32,400 for females. The per capita income for the county was $28,789. About 5.00% of families and 8.30% of the population were below the poverty line, including 10.50% of those under age 18 and 5.90% of those age 65 or over.

Besides English, languages with significant numbers of speakers in Hennepin County include Arabic, Hmong, Khmer, Lao, Russian, Somali, Spanish, and Vietnamese.

=== Religious statistics ===
In 2010, Hennepin County's largest religious group was the Archdiocese of Saint Paul and Minneapolis, with 215,205 Catholics worshipping at 73 parishes, followed by 124,732 ELCA Lutherans with 106 congregations, 59,811 non-denominational adherents with 103 congregations, 20,286 UMC Methodists with 42 congregations, 18,836 Missouri Synod Lutherans with 34 congregations, 16,941 PC-USA Presbyterians with 21 congregations, 16,230 Converge Baptists with 26 congregations, 16,128 AoG Pentecostals with 32 congregations, 12,307 UCC Christians with 20 congregations, and 8,608 Reform Jews with three congregations. Altogether, religious congregations claimed 54.3% of the population as members, though members of historically African-American denominations were underrepresented due to incomplete information. In 2014, Hennepin County had 708 religious organizations, the 16th-most of all U.S. counties.

== Law and government ==
=== Commissioners ===
Like all Minnesota counties, Hennepin is governed by an elected and nonpartisan board of commissioners. In Minnesota, county commissions usually have five members, but Hennepin, Ramsey, Dakota, Anoka and St. Louis counties have seven members. Each commissioner represents a district of approximately equal population. In Hennepin County, the commission appoints the medical examiner, the county auditor-treasurer, and the county recorder. The sheriff and county attorney are also elected on a nonpartisan ticket. The county government's headquarters are in downtown Minneapolis in the Hennepin County Government Center. The county oversees the Hennepin County Library system (which merged with the Minneapolis Public Library system in 2008) and Hennepin County Medical Center. The county commission also elects a chair who presides at meetings.

District	Commissioner	In office since	Current term expires in January
1st	Jeff Lunde (Republican)	2021	2025
2nd	Irene Fernando (DFL)	2019	2027
3rd	Marion Greene (DFL) (chair)	2014	2027
4th	Angela Conley (DFL)	2019	2027
5th	Debbie Goettel (DFL)	2017	2025
6th	Heather Edelson (DFL)	2024	2025
7th	Kevin Anderson (DFL)	2021	2025

=== Key staff ===
Hennepin County's normal operations are coordinated by County Administrator David Hough, Assistant County Administrator for Human Services Jodi Wentland, Assistant County Administrator for Operations Dan Rogan, Assistant County Administrator for Public Works Lisa Cerney, Assistant County Administrator for Disparity Reduction May Xiong, and Assistant County Administrator for Public Safety Chela Guzman-Wiegert.

=== Public safety ===
==== County sheriff ====
The Hennepin County sheriff manages the county jail, patrols waterways, provides security for the District Court, handles home foreclosures, participates in homeland security activities and in law enforcement, and by state law is responsible for handling applications for permits to carry a firearm for county residents. The sheriff is Dawanna Witt, who was elected in 2022.

==== Medical examiner's office ====
The Hennepin County medical examiner's office is responsible for investigating all unexpected deaths in Hennepin County as well as neighboring Dakota and Scott counties. The office determines who and why a person died, which may lead to criminal charges being filed by prosecutors. Upon request, the office may provide services for other jurisdictions.

==== County attorney ====
The Hennepin County Attorney sets policies and priorities for prosecuting criminal cases, oversees child protection and child support cases, and provides legal advice and representation to county government. The current county attorney is Mary Moriarty, who was elected in 2022.

== Politics ==
United States presidential election results for Hennepin County, Minnesota
Year	Republican		Democratic		Third party(ies)	
Year	No.	%	No.	%	No.	%
1892	20,603	49.93%	16,448	39.86%	4,209	10.20%
1896	26,786	55.47%	20,515	42.48%	987	2.04%
1900	26,902	62.42%	14,498	33.64%	1,695	3.93%
1904	31,437	73.71%	5,708	13.38%	5,503	12.90%
1908	27,787	58.73%	16,169	34.17%	3,357	7.10%
1912	14,379	29.64%	15,530	32.02%	18,596	38.34%
1916	27,957	40.78%	36,395	53.09%	4,204	6.13%
1920	90,517	64.58%	28,911	20.63%	20,741	14.80%
1924	101,120	59.02%	10,806	6.31%	59,401	34.67%
1928	125,472	60.19%	80,851	38.79%	2,124	1.02%
1932	91,087	41.87%	119,234	54.80%	7,245	3.33%
1936	81,206	33.08%	144,289	58.78%	19,985	8.14%
1940	122,960	45.48%	145,168	53.69%	2,230	0.82%
1944	116,781	43.69%	148,792	55.66%	1,747	0.65%
1948	121,169	42.93%	151,920	53.83%	9,145	3.24%
1952	180,338	53.49%	155,388	46.09%	1,415	0.42%
1956	183,248	55.01%	149,341	44.83%	523	0.16%
1960	198,992	51.26%	188,250	48.50%	939	0.24%
1964	154,736	39.00%	241,020	60.75%	971	0.24%
1968	170,002	41.77%	220,078	54.07%	16,944	4.16%
1972	228,951	51.64%	205,943	46.45%	8,464	1.91%
1976	211,892	43.84%	257,380	53.25%	14,106	2.92%
1980	194,898	38.57%	239,592	47.41%	70,882	14.03%
1984	253,921	47.98%	272,401	51.47%	2,912	0.55%
1988	240,209	44.60%	292,909	54.39%	5,444	1.01%
1992	179,581	30.61%	278,648	47.50%	128,390	21.89%
1996	173,887	33.17%	285,126	54.38%	65,293	12.45%
2000	225,657	39.32%	307,599	53.60%	40,590	7.07%
2004	255,133	39.43%	383,841	59.33%	8,007	1.24%
2008	231,054	34.81%	420,958	63.42%	11,768	1.77%
2012	240,073	35.30%	423,982	62.34%	16,010	2.35%
2016	191,770	28.20%	429,288	63.13%	58,919	8.66%
2020	205,973	27.25%	532,623	70.46%	17,373	2.30%
2024	197,244	27.39%	502,710	69.80%	20,219	2.81%

Like most urban counties nationwide, Hennepin County is a Democratic stronghold. It has voted Democratic in every election since 1964, except for 1972, when Richard Nixon won the county as part of a national landslide. It is also a state presidential bellwether county, having voted for Minnesota's statewide winner in every election since 1964, the longest such streak in the state. In 2020, Joe Biden won 70% of the vote in the county, the largest percentage for any candidate since 1904. At the state level, the county is no less Democratic. For governor and U.S. Senate, the last Republicans to win the county were Arne Carlson in 1994 and David Durenberger in 1988, respectively.

== Transportation ==
=== Transit ===
- Maple Grove Transit
- Metro Transit
- Minnesota Valley Transit Authority
- Plymouth Metrolink
- Southwest Transit
- Hawthorne Transportation Center
  - Flixbus
  - Greyhound Lines
  - Jefferson Lines

=== Major highways ===
- Interstate 35W
- Interstate 94
- Interstate 394
- Interstate 494
- Interstate 694
- US Highway 12
- US Highway 52
- US Highway 169
- US Highway 212
- Minnesota State Highway 5
- Minnesota State Highway 7
- Minnesota State Highway 41
- Minnesota State Highway 47
- Minnesota State Highway 55
- Minnesota State Highway 62
- Minnesota State Highway 65
- Minnesota State Highway 77
- Minnesota State Highway 100
- Minnesota State Highway 101
- Minnesota State Highway 121
- Minnesota State Highway 252
- Minnesota State Highway 610
- Hennepin County Road 17 (France Avenue)
- Hennepin County Road 61
- Hennepin County Road 81
- Hennepin County Road 122
- Other county roads

=== Airports ===
- Minneapolis–Saint Paul International Airport (MSP) serves the Twin Cities area. It is the 17th-busiest airport in the United States by passenger traffic and serves as a hub for Delta Air Lines.
- Crystal Airport (MIC) is a public airport in Crystal.
- Flying Cloud Airport (FCM) is a public airport in Eden Prairie.

== Economy ==
=== Major companies and employers ===
As the economic center of Minnesota and the Upper Midwest, Hennepin County is home to many major companies in a diverse section of industries. As of the 2018 estimate, there are twelve Fortune 500 companies headquartered in Hennepin County, five of which are located in Minneapolis.

Fortune 500 companies in Hennepin County
Company name	National rank	Revenue ($ millions), 2018 estimate	Headquarters city	Industry
UnitedHealth Group	5	201,159	Minnetonka	Managed healthcare
Target	39	71,879	Minneapolis	General retailing
Best Buy	72	42,151	Richfield	Electronics retailing
U.S. Bancorp	122	23,996	Minneapolis	Banking and finance
SuperValu	180	16,009	Eden Prairie	Food distribution and retailing
General Mills	182	15,619.8	Golden Valley	Food processing
C.H. Robinson	193	14,869.4	Eden Prairie	Transportation
Ameriprise Financial	252	12,075	Minneapolis	Financial services
Xcel Energy	266	11,404	Minneapolis	Electricity and natural gas utility
Thrivent Financial	343	8,527.9	Minneapolis	Financial services
Mosaic	382	7,409.4	Plymouth	Fertilizer manufacturing
Polaris	496	5,504.8	Medina	Snowmobile manufacturing

Tree map of employment by industry in Hennepin County (2015)

Hennepin County is also home to several major private companies such as Carlson and Cargill, both located in Minnetonka, the latter of which is the largest privately owned company in the United States.

Along with these major companies, Hennepin County also contains several large employers, as listed below. According to the 2016 American Community Survey, the largest overall industries in Hennepin County are healthcare and social assistance (96,511 workers), manufacturing (80,324), and retail trade (75,861).

Largest employers in Hennepin County
Employer	Number of employees	Industry
University of Minnesota	18,000	Education
Target Stores Inc	10,000	Retail
Pharmacy at Park Nicollet	9,000	Healthcare
Park Nicollet Methodist Hospital	8,200	Healthcare
Park Nicollet Clinic	8,000	Healthcare
M Health Fairview University of Minnesota Medical Center	8,000	Healthcare
M Health Fairview University of Minnesota Masonic Children's Hospital	7,658	Healthcare
Ameriprise Financial Inc	7,000	Financial Services
Park Nicollet Urgent Care	7,000	Healthcare
Best Buy Inc	6,000	Electronics Retail

=== Economic indicators ===
According to the 2016 American Community Survey, the average household income in Hennepin County is $71,200. The GINI Index for 2016 was 0.461, lower than the national average of 0.485. As of 2016, nearly 132,000 residents of Hennepin County were living under the poverty line, 10.9% of the county population. This figure is lower than the national average of 14%.

== Education ==
=== Tertiary education ===
Colleges and universities in the county include:

- Augsburg University in Minneapolis
- Dunwoody College of Technology in downtown Minneapolis
- Hamline University – Minneapolis campus in St. Louis Park
- Hennepin Technical College in Brooklyn Park and Eden Prairie
- Metropolitan State University in downtown Minneapolis and Brooklyn Park
- Minneapolis College of Art and Design in Minneapolis
- Minneapolis Community and Technical College in downtown Minneapolis
- Minnesota State University, Mankato – Twin Cities campus in Edina
- Normandale Community College in Bloomington
- North Central University in downtown Minneapolis
- North Hennepin Community College in Brooklyn Park
- Northwestern Health Sciences University in Bloomington
- St. Cloud State University – Twin Cities campus in Plymouth
- Saint Mary's University of Minnesota – Twin Cities campus in Minneapolis
- University of Minnesota – Twin Cities campus in Minneapolis
- University of St. Thomas – Minneapolis campus in downtown Minneapolis

=== K–12 education ===
School districts include:

- Anoka-Hennepin School District 11
- Bloomington Public School District
- Brooklyn Center School District
- Buffalo-Hanover-Montrose Public Schools
- Delano Public School District
- Edina Public Schools
- Elk River School District
- Eden Prairie Public School District
- Hopkins Public Schools
- Minneapolis Public Schools
- Minnetonka Public School District
- Orono School District
- Osseo Area School District 279
- Richfield Public Schools
- Robbinsdale Public School District
- Rockford Area Schools
- St. Anthony-New Brighton School District
- St. Louis Park Public School District
- Waconia Public Schools
- Watertown-Mayer Public School District
- Wayzata Public Schools
- Westonka Public School District

=== Public libraries ===
- Hennepin County Library (which Minneapolis Public Library merged into)

== Recreation ==
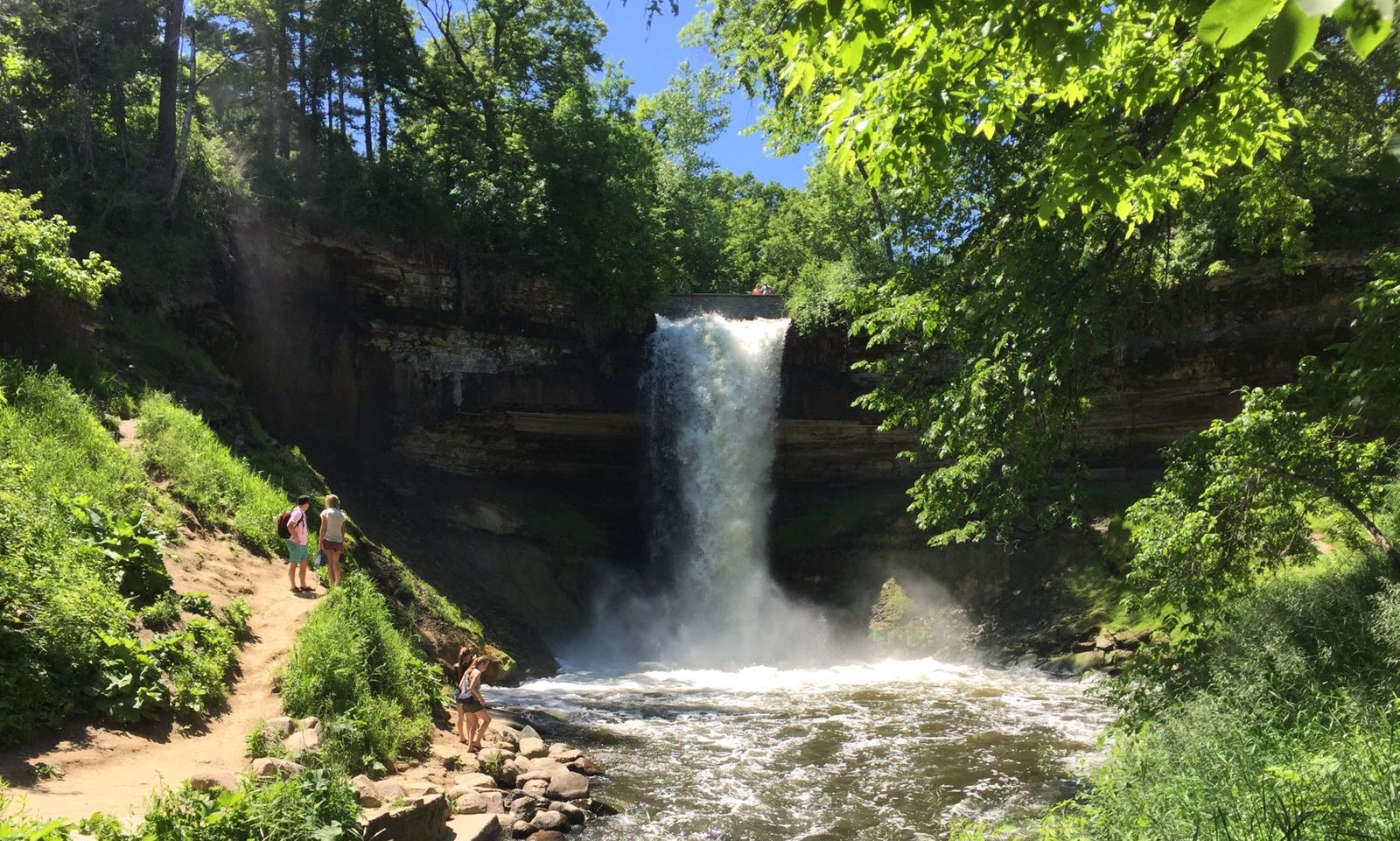
Minnehaha Falls is the main attraction and namesake of Minnehaha Park.

=== Parks ===
Hennepin County, and particularly Minneapolis, is renowned for its expansive and high-quality park system. The Minneapolis park system has been called the best-designed, best-financed, and best-maintained in America, and is run by the independently elected Minneapolis Park and Recreation Board. It has been named the top park system in the country by the Trust for Public Land for five consecutive years as of 2017. Many of Minneapolis's parks are linked by the Grand Rounds National Scenic Byway, a series of interconnected parks and paths that extends for 51 miles. The byway is divided into seven districts: Downtown Riverfront, Mississippi River, Minnehaha, Chain of Lakes, Theodore Wirth, Victory Memorial, and Northeast. The byway includes many major destinations in Minneapolis, including Nicollet Island, St. Anthony Falls, Stone Arch Bridge, Mill Ruins Park, Mississippi National River and Recreation Area, Minnehaha Creek, Minnehaha Park, Lake Hiawatha, Lake Nokomis, Lake Harriet, Bde Maka Ska, Lake of the Isles, Cedar Lake, and Theodore Wirth Park.

Outside Minneapolis, Hennepin County is also served by the Three Rivers Park District, a park system containing 20 parks and 10 trails spanning the Twin Cities metro area. Three Rivers is overseen by seven commissioners, five of whom are elected by residents and two of whom are appointed by Hennepin County commissioners.

=== Culture ===
Numerous art institutions in Minneapolis make Hennepin County a national center for the arts. It contains some of the country's largest and best-known centers for art, including the Minneapolis Institute of Art, Walker Art Center, Weisman Art Museum, and the Minneapolis Sculpture Garden. Major art centers include Northeast Minneapolis and the Minneapolis neighborhood of North Loop. Minneapolis is home to many important artist organizations, such as the Traffic Zone Center for Visual Art, the Handicraft Guild, and the Northeast Minneapolis Arts Association.

Hennepin County is also home to a thriving theater scene, highlighted by the Guthrie Theater in downtown Minneapolis. It is home to many theater companies, such as Mixed Blood, Skewed Visions, Brave New Workshop, and Children's Theatre Company. Other notable theaters include the Orpheum Theatre, the State Theatre, and the Pantages Theatre. Many other cities in the county are home to local community theaters, such as Eden Prairie, Minnetonka, Orono, Osseo, and Plymouth.

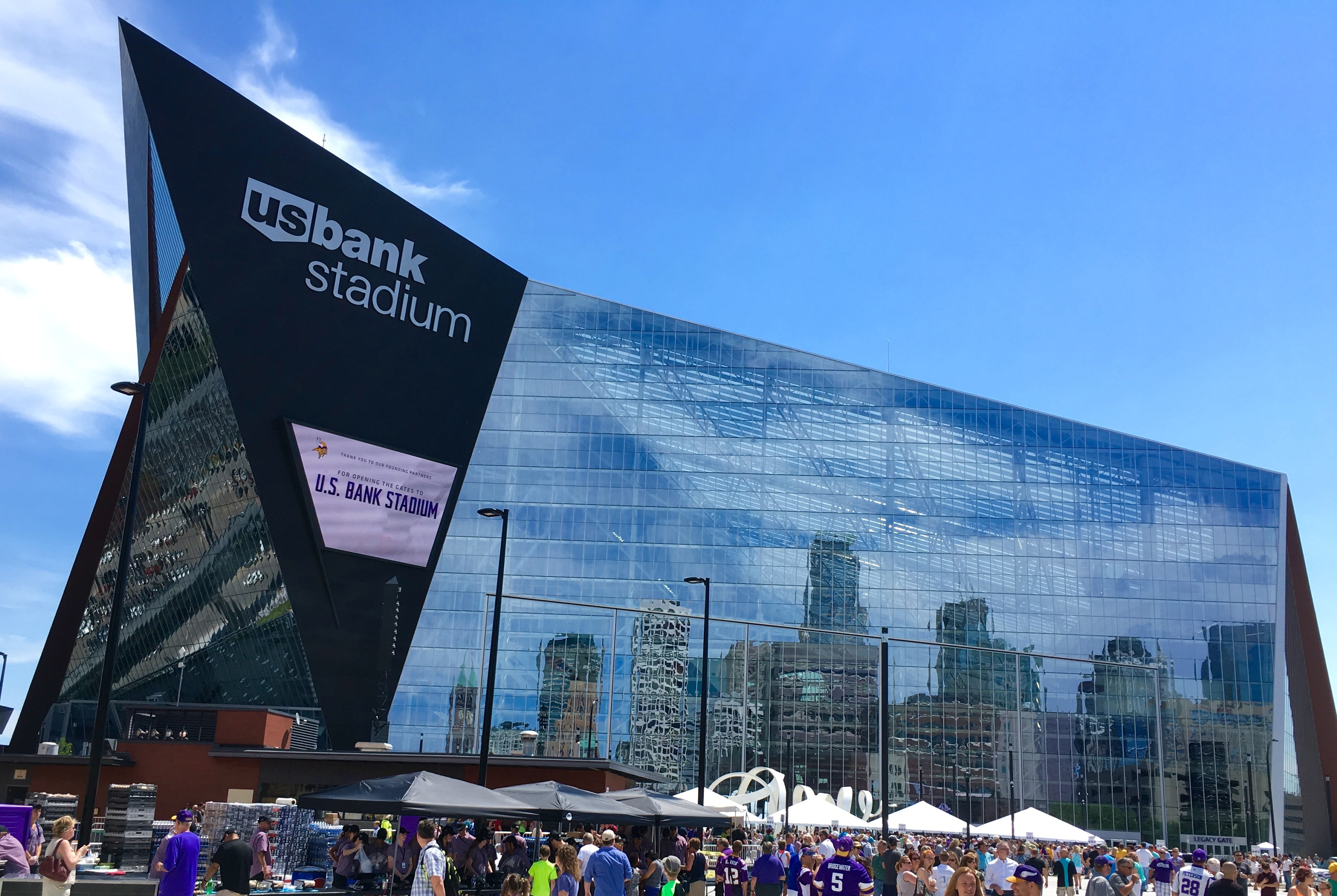
U.S. Bank Stadium, home of the Minnesota Vikings, was constructed in 2016, and was the site of Super Bowl LII.

=== Sports ===
Of the "Big Four" sports leagues in the US, three are located in Minneapolis: the Minnesota Twins play in Target Field, the Minnesota Timberwolves play in Target Center, and the Minnesota Vikings play in U.S. Bank Stadium. Additionally, among major sports leagues, the Minnesota Lynx also play in Target Center.

== Cities ==
- Bloomington
- Brooklyn Center
- Brooklyn Park
- Champlin
- Chanhassen (partial)
- Corcoran
- Crystal
- Dayton (partial)
- Deephaven
- Eden Prairie
- Edina
- Excelsior
- Golden Valley
- Greenfield
- Greenwood
- Hanover (partial)
- Hopkins
- Independence
- Long Lake
- Loretto
- Maple Grove
- Maple Plain
- Medicine Lake
- Medina
- Minneapolis (county seat and largest municipality)
- Minnetonka
- Minnetonka Beach
- Minnetrista
- Mound
- New Hope
- Orono
- Osseo
- Plymouth
- Richfield
- Robbinsdale
- Rockford (partial)
- Rogers
- Shorewood
- Spring Park
- St. Anthony (partial)
- St. Bonifacius
- St. Louis Park
- Tonka Bay
- Wayzata
- Woodland

=== Unorganized territory ===
- Fort Snelling

== See also ==
- National Register of Historic Places listings in Hennepin County, Minnesota
