= West Metro Education Program =

Defunct group of schools near Minneapolis, Minnesota, USA

Coordinates: 44°59′1.5″N 93°20′26″W

District information
- Closed: June 30, 2018

Other information
- Subdistricts: Brooklyn Center School District; Columbia Heights School District; Eden Prairie School District; Edina Public Schools; Hopkins Public Schools; Minneapolis Public Schools; Richfield Public Schools; Robbinsdale Area Schools; St. Anthony-New Brighton School District; St. Louis Park School District; Wayzata Public Schools

The West Metro Education Program (WMEP) was a voluntary consortium of 11 urban and suburban school districts in the Minneapolis area of Minnesota. As an educational equity-focused collaborative for student success and educator growth, WMEP offered professional development, equity leadership and student programs to build capacity in the region.

WMEP dissolved on June 30, 2018.

Known as Joint Powers School District 6069, member school districts of WMEP included:

- Brooklyn Center School District
- Columbia Heights School District
- Eden Prairie School District
- Edina Public Schools
- Hopkins Public Schools
- Minneapolis Public Schools
- Richfield Public Schools
- Robbinsdale Area Schools
- St. Anthony-New Brighton School District
- St. Louis Park School District
- Wayzata Public Schools
