= FAIR School =

Magnet school in Minnesota, United States

Coordinates: 45.027164°N 93.357444°W

Information
- School district: Robbinsdale Public School District
- NCES District ID: 2731780
- NCES School ID: 273178004952
- Teaching staff: 21.86 FTE
- Grades: 6-8
- Enrollment: 381 (2023-2024)
- Student to teacher ratio: 17.43:1
- Website: fair.rdale.org

FAIR School Crystal (Fine Arts Interdisciplinary Resource) is a magnet school located in Crystal, Minnesota, that specializes in the Fine Arts and educates students in the 6th through 8th grades. FAIR is part of the Robbinsdale Area Schools School District, with its partner school FAIR School Downtown, located in downtown Minneapolis, Minnesota, which is K-12. It was once part of its own independent school district called WMEP (West Metro Education Program) that came under fire around 2013 surrounding several controversies. Of the school's 550 students, 218 come from Minneapolis Public Schools, 74 come from Robbinsdale Area Schools, 49 come from Wayzata Public Schools, and the remainder come from other metro districts and a few other school districts.

In 2008, the school was recognized by the United States Department of Education as one of six schools nationwide that should serve as models for magnet schools. These six schools were chosen for strong student achievement, continued success, and the ability to bring white and minority students together.

The current building, at 3915 Adair Ave. N., was built on the site of a previous school, Jeannette A. Fair Elementary School. The elementary school was part of the Robbinsdale Area Schools and was built in 1952. It was originally named Adair Elementary.

== Departments ==
FAIR School extends its reach to a wide variety of arts, including:

=== Theatre ===
The Theatre department at FAIR school works with Stages Theater Company to produce two shows each year: a fall musical and spring play. InterDistrict Downtown School also holds performances on the FAIR School stage.

=== Dance ===
FAIR's Dance instruction focuses mainly on modern dance, with classes taught daily in the FAIR dance space. The school holds various dance performances by the students throughout the year.

=== Visual arts ===
The Visual Arts teacher at FAIR School teaches sculpting, wheel throwing, body structure, sketching, landscapes, primitive outdoor pottery firing, and more. Students help dig a hole, which is lined with sawdust. The clay pieces are wrapped in copper wire, seaweed, splattered with salt water and other materials, which affect the coloring of the clay pieces, which will then be wrapped in newspaper. For most of the school day the students monitor the fire and keep it going.

=== Media arts ===
The Media Arts department includes a TV studio, Mac Lab, digital photography, animation, and education about using Photoshop to edit digital pictures.

=== Literary arts ===
Literary arts opportunities vary and are integrated through most subjects.

=== Music ===
The music department includes choir, sound art, band, and orchestra.
