= Medina, Minnesota =

City in Minnesota, United States

- City
- City of Medina
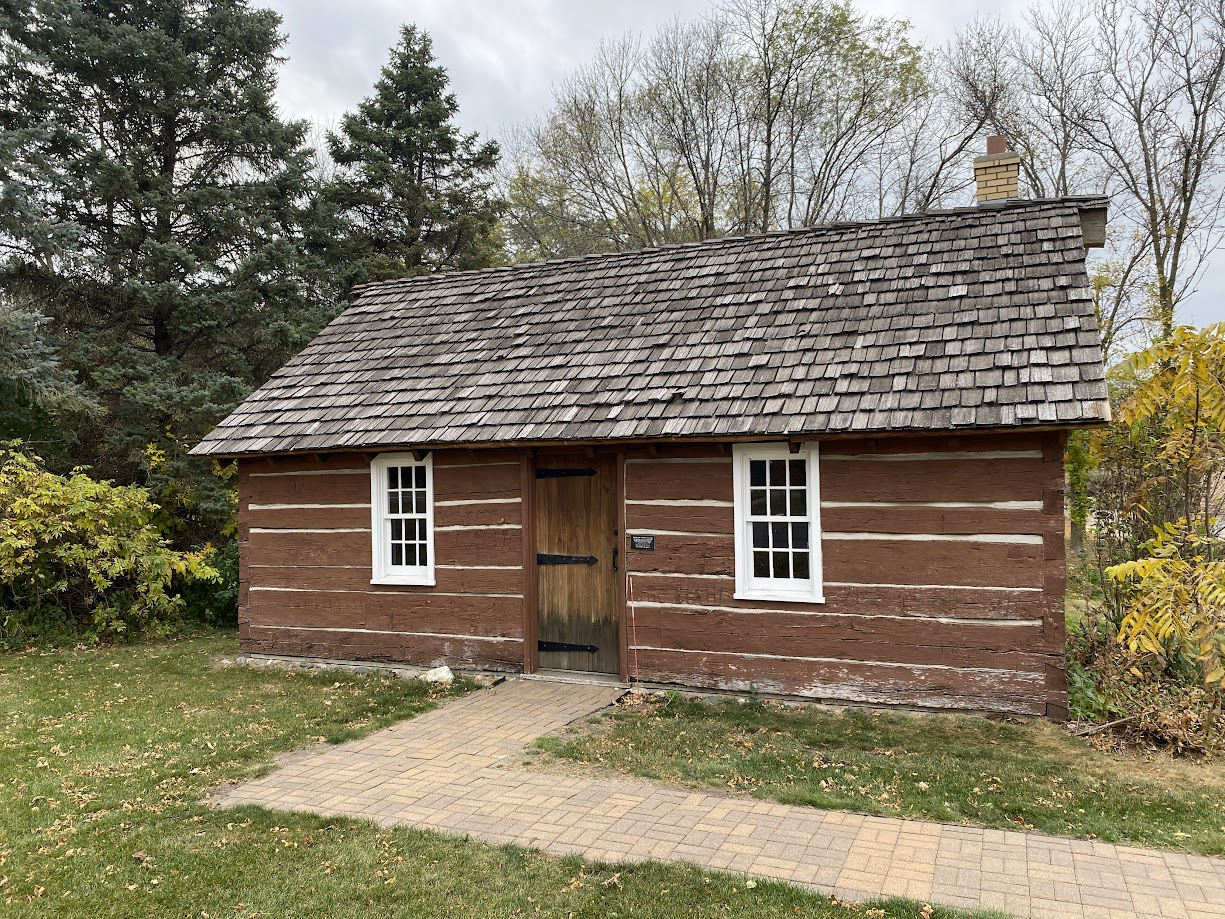
- Historic 1857 Cabin originally on Wolsfeld Lake, now moved to City Hall

- Logo

- Location of Medina within Hennepin County, Minnesota
- Coordinates: 45°2′41″N 93°34′23″W
- Country: United States
- State: Minnesota
- County: Hennepin
- Founded: 1858
- Incorporated: 1955 (village); 1974 (city)
- Named for: Medina, Saudi Arabia

Government
  - Type: Mayor-Council
  - Mayor: Kathy Martin

Area
  - City: 27.13 sq mi (70.26 km^{2})
  - Land: 25.55 sq mi (66.18 km^{2})
  - Water: 1.58 sq mi (4.08 km^{2})
- Elevation: 1,060 ft (323 m)

Population (2020)
  - City: 6,837
  - Density: 267.6/sq mi (103.32/km^{2})
  - Metro: 3,459,146
- Time zone: UTC-6 (Central)
  - Summer (DST): UTC-5 (Central)
- ZIP codes: 55340, 55357, 55359, 55391
- Area code: 763
- FIPS code: 27-41480
- GNIS feature ID: 1690854
- Website: City of Medina

Medina is a city in Hennepin County, Minnesota, United States. It is an outer suburb of the Twin Cities, located about 15 miles (24 km) west of Minneapolis, the population was 6,837 at the 2020 census. A largely rural city, it has become more suburbanized since the 1970s. It is home to the headquarters of automaker Polaris, which also produces Indian Motorcycle.

== History ==
Originally named Hamburg Township, it was soon after, on May 11, 1858, renamed after the city of Medina, Saudi Arabia, which had been in the news that year. The township of Medina extended as far south as Lake Minnetonka until Orono Township was formed in 1889. On May 26, 1955, Medina Township was incorporated as a village. It became a city in 1974 when Minnesota changed its statutes.

For almost all of Medina's history, it has been a rural community with a large farming presence. But beginning in the 1970s, it became more urbanized, with paved roads, street signs, and some suburban developments.

== Geography ==
According to the United States Census Bureau, the city has an area of 27.00 square miles (69.93 km^{2}), of which 25.45 square miles (65.92 km^{2}) is land and 1.55 square miles (4.01 km^{2}) is water. Minnesota State Highway 55 serves as the main route. Other routes include County Roads 19 and 24. The city of Loretto is completely enclaved by the city of Medina; Loretto is in the northwestern corner of Medina.

== Demographics ==
Historical population
Census	Pop.	Note	%±
1860	374		—
1870	1,058		182.9%
1880	1,462		38.2%
1890	840		−42.5%
1900	990		17.9%
1910	945		−4.5%
1920	942		−0.3%
1930	990		5.1%
1940	1,045		5.6%
1950	1,166		11.6%
1960	1,472		26.2%
1970	2,396		62.8%
1980	2,623		9.5%
1990	3,096		18.0%
2000	4,005		29.4%
2010	4,892		22.1%
2020	6,837		39.8%
U.S. Decennial Census; 2013 Estimate

=== 2020 census ===
As of the 2020 census, Medina had a population of 6,837. The median age was 40.3 years. 29.3% of residents were under the age of 18 and 14.9% of residents were 65 years of age or older. For every 100 females there were 95.6 males, and for every 100 females age 18 and over there were 94.6 males age 18 and over.

69.7% of residents lived in urban areas, while 30.3% lived in rural areas.

There were 2,298 households in Medina, of which 45.4% had children under the age of 18 living in them. Of all households, 74.5% were married-couple households, 9.3% were households with a male householder and no spouse or partner present, and 13.2% were households with a female householder and no spouse or partner present. About 14.3% of all households were made up of individuals and 8.4% had someone living alone who was 65 years of age or older.

There were 2,411 housing units, of which 4.7% were vacant. The homeowner vacancy rate was 1.4% and the rental vacancy rate was 3.2%.

Racial composition as of the 2020 census
Race	Number	Percent
White	5,542	81.1%
Black or African American	148	2.2%
American Indian and Alaska Native	8	0.1%
Asian	708	10.4%
Native Hawaiian and Other Pacific Islander	1	0.0%
Some other race	51	0.7%
Two or more races	379	5.5%
Hispanic or Latino (of any race)	164	2.4%

=== 2010 census ===
As of the census of 2010, there were 4,892 people, 1,702 households, and 1,386 families living in the city. The population density was 192.2 inhabitants per square mile (74.2/km^{2}). There were 1,780 housing units at an average density of 69.9 per square mile (27.0/km^{2}). The racial makeup of the city was 94.0% White, 1.0% African American, 0.1% Native American, 3.2% Asian, 0.4% from other races, and 1.3% from two or more races. Hispanic or Latino of any race were 1.2% of the population.

There were 1,702 households, of which 42.0% had children under the age of 18 living with them, 74.4% were married couples living together, 4.8% had a female householder with no husband present, 2.3% had a male householder with no wife present, and 18.6% were non-families. 15.6% of all households were made up of individuals, and 7.3% had someone living alone who was 65 years of age or older. The average household size was 2.87 and the average family size was 3.23.

The median age in the city was 43.3 years. 30.7% of residents were under the age of 18; 4.7% were between the ages of 18 and 24; 18% were from 25 to 44; 34.4% were from 45 to 64; and 12.2% were 65 years of age or older. The gender makeup of the city was 49.8% male and 50.2% female.

=== 2000 census ===
As of the census of 2000, there were 4,005 people, 1,309 households, and 1,117 families living in the city. The population density was 156.7 inhabitants per square mile (60.5/km^{2}). There were 1,337 housing units at an average density of 52.3 per square mile (20.2/km^{2}). The racial makeup of the city was 97.33% White, 0.47% African American, 0.22% Native American, 1.20% Asian, 0.02% Pacific Islander, 0.17% from other races, and 0.57% from two or more races. Hispanic or Latino of any race were 0.82% of the population.

There were 1,309 households, out of which 47.0% had children under the age of 18 living with them, 78.4% were married couples living together, 4.3% had a female householder with no husband present, and 14.6% were non-families. 11.2% of all households were made up of individuals, and 2.8% had someone living alone who was 65 years of age or older. The average household size was 3.05 and the average family size was 3.31.

In the city, the population was spread out, with 32.2% under the age of 18, 5.0% from 18 to 24, 28.5% from 25 to 44, 27.3% from 45 to 64, and 6.9% who were 65 years of age or older. The median age was 38 years. For every 100 females, there were 99.7 males. For every 100 females age 18 and over, there were 103.6 males.

The median income for a household in the city was $88,847, and the median income for a family was $96,909. Males had a median income of $65,938 versus $32,460 for females. The per capita income for the city was $49,127. About 0.4% of families and 1.3% of the population were below the poverty line, including 1.5% of those under age 18 and none of those age 65 or over.

== Government ==
Presidential election results

Precinct General Election Results
Year	Republican	Democratic	Third parties
2024	45.7% 2,066	50.9% 2,304	3.4% 155
2020	47.8% 2,152	50.2% 2,261	2.0% 92
2016	50.6% 1,853	40.4% 1,479	9.0% 329
2012	65.3% 2,113	33.1% 1,071	1.6% 51
2008	61.6% 1,928	37.1% 1,163	1.3% 40
2004	64.8% 1,746	34.1% 919	1.1% 29
2000	63.7% 1,463	32.0% 733	4.3% 99
1996	53.2% 1,039	35.4% 692	11.4% 222
1992	43.2% 897	28.0% 581	28.8% 598
1988	63.4% 1,029	36.6% 595	0.0% 0
1984	65.8% 983	34.2% 510	0.0% 0
1980	53.9% 749	34.1% 473	12.0% 167
1976	51.3% 603	45.7% 537	3.0% 36
1968	43.3% 363	51.6% 432	5.1% 43
1964	36.2% 265	63.8% 467	0.0% 0
1960	44.6% 282	55.4% 350	0.0% 0

== Education ==
Medina is covered by four school districts:

- Orono
- Delano
- Rockford
- Wayzata

== Notable people ==
- Brian Burke – former National Hockey League general manager and executive
- Caden Clark – soccer player
- Steve Hutchinson – retired, all-pro guard for the Minnesota Vikings
- Corey Koskie – retired, former Major League Baseball third baseman
- Greg LeMond – former Cycling World Champion and three-time Tour de France winning bicycle racer. LeMond is the only American to ever win the Tour de France
- John Randle – retired, Hall of Fame NFL player
- Flip Saunders – former NBA basketball head coach, and former President of Basketball Operations
- Ryan Saunders – NBA head coach for the Minnesota Timberwolves
- Carlos Silva – professional Major League Baseball pitcher
- Karen Philipp – American singer and actress
- Pat Proft – director/writer known for Naked Gun films
- Karl-Anthony Towns – former player for the Minnesota Timberwolves

== See also ==
- Hamel, Minnesota
- Hennepin County
