= Turck =

German manufacturing company

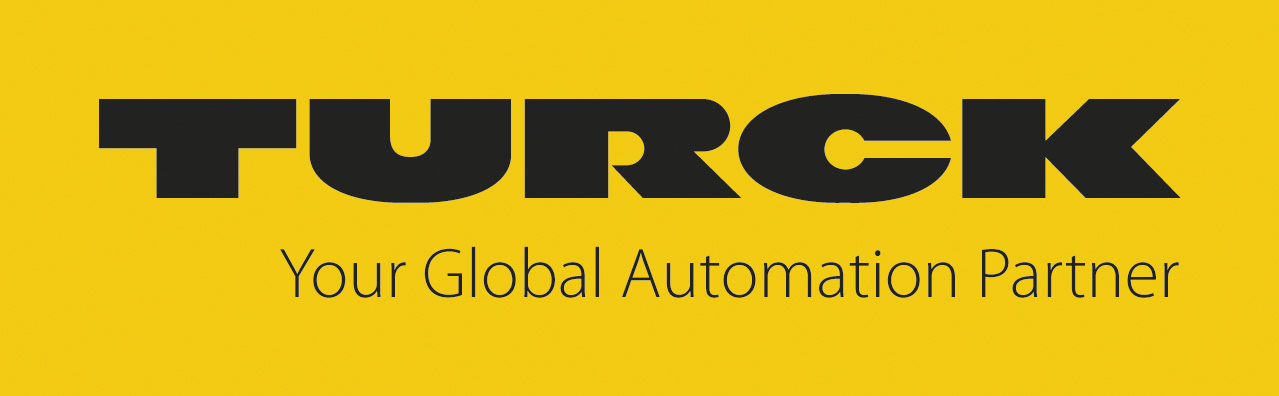
- Industry: Industrial Automation
- Founded: 1965
- Headquarters: Mülheim and Halver, North Rhine-Westphalia, Germany
- Key people: Christian Wolf, Christian Pauli, Michael Gürtner, Stefan Grotzke
- Revenue: €470.3 million (2021)
- Number of employees: 2,510 (2021)
- Website: www.turck.com

The Turck Group is an international supplier of automation technology for factory, process, and logistics automation based in the German towns Mülheim and Halver.

== History ==
In 1960, Hans Turck laid one of the foundations for the current group of companies by establishing his own engineering office in Mülheim. In 1965, Turck received an order from a German chemical plant to develop an amplifier module. The first 20 of these devices were produced by his brother, Werner Turck, in his flat in Halver. The two brothers then founded the company Turck Elektronik Feinbau, initially developing inductive and capacitive proximity switches. Shortly after, Hermann Hermes joined the company as a partner.

Turck's early international orientation dates back to the 1970s with first sales offices in the United States in 1973 and the foundation of Turck Inc. in Minneapolis, United States in 1975. Shortly afterwards, sales offices were also opened in Belgium.

Since then, the company has established numerous new sales and production companies worldwide. Turck took over a measuring instrument factory in 1989, based in Beierfeld, Saxony, and thus entered into East European markets. In 1994, a production and sales company was also founded in Tianjin, China, to enter the Asian market.

In 1998, Hans Turck and Hermann Hermes retired, with the third founder, Werner Turck, following in 2011. In July 2015, Hans Turck, the second company founder, died. This occurred nearly three months after the death of his brother Werner Turck. The last co-founder, Hermann Hermes, died in January 2019. Since the retirement of Hans Turck’s son, Ulrich Turck, in March 2018, no representatives of the founding families have been involved in the management of the group.

The Turck Group is a 100 percent family-owned business. In 2023, the majority of shareholders were able to prevent the heirs of Werner Turck from selling their shares to the private equity firm Triton Partners. After a legal dispute, the case was legally concluded by the Hagen Regional Court at the end of 2023, and the Werner Turck Family Foundation was excluded as a shareholder from Turck Holding GmbH. The descendants of Hans Turck and Hermann Hermes became the sole shareholders.

After 17 years of presence, the Group discontinued its business activities in Belarus and Russia in March 2022 in response to the Russian invasion of Ukraine.

== Organization ==
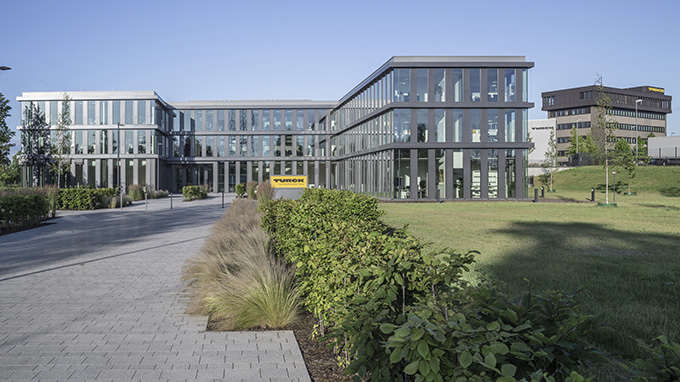
Sales and marketing headquarters of the Turck Group in Mülheim

Turck Holding GmbH functions as the holding company of the group. The group is primarily composed of two companies, TURCK GmbH in Mülheim, responsible for sales and marketing, and Werner Turck GmbH & Co. KG in Halver, responsible for development and manufacturing.

Additionally, Turck Holding includes subsidiaries such as Turck Beierfeld GmbH in Beierfeld (electronic development and manufacturing of customer-specific assemblies), Turck Electronics GmbH, another development site in Detmold, and Turck Mechatec GmbH in Mülheim, which is active in the manufacturing and sales of control cabinet and connection solutions. Besides its locations in Germany, the Turck Group is represented worldwide by numerous subsidiaries, holdings, and specialised representatives. In addition to the companies of the holding company, Turck Inc. in Minneapolis, United States, also belongs to the Turck Group.

== Products ==
Turck develops, produces and markets electronic products, system solutions and services for recording, processing and transferring relevant production data for factory, process, and logistics automation. The range includes products and solutions from the fields of sensor, fieldbus, control, cloud, connection, and interface technology as well as HMI and RFID. The subsidiary Turck Vilant Systems offers RFID systems, including its own middleware and ERP integration.

== Awards ==
In 2019, Turck received the iF Product Design Award for its PS+ pressure sensor, which also won the Automation Award from the German trade journal Elektro Automation in the same year.
