= FAIR School for Arts =

School in Minnesota, United States

Coordinates: 44°58′32″N 93°16′39″W

Information
- Grades: 9-12
- Website: fair.mpschools.org

The Fine Arts Interdisciplinary Resource (FAIR) School for Arts is a magnet school located in downtown Minneapolis, Minnesota, United States. It is a part of Minneapolis Public Schools and educates students in grades K-12.
