= Robbinsdale Public School District =

Public school district in Minnesota, US

Coordinates: 45°2′N 93°22′W

- 4148 Winnetka Ave N

District information
- Grades: PreK–12
- Schools: 28

Students and staff
- Students: 10,735
- Teachers: 707.05 FTE
- Student–teacher ratio: 15.18:1

Other information
- Website: www.rdale.org

Robbinsdale School District 281 is a school district centered in Robbinsdale, Minnesota, in the northwestern suburbs of Minneapolis, Minnesota, USA. The district includes all of Robbinsdale, Crystal, and New Hope, and parts of Brooklyn Center, Brooklyn Park, Plymouth, and Golden Valley.

== Schools ==
=== Elementary Schools ===
- Forest Elementary (Crystal)
- Lakeview Elementary (Robbinsdale)
- Meadow Lake Elementary (New Hope)
- Neill Elementary (Golden Valley)
- Northport Elementary (Brooklyn Center)
- Zachary Lane Elementary (Plymouth)

=== Magnet Schools ===
- FAIR School Pilgrim Lane (Plymouth)
- Robbinsdale Spanish Immersion School or (RSI) [New Hope]
- School of Engineering and Arts (SEA) [Golden Valley]

=== Middle schools ===
- Plymouth Middle School (Plymouth)
- Sandburg Middle School, (Golden Valley)

=== High schools ===
- Highview Alternative Program (Golden Valley)
- Robbinsdale Armstrong High School (Plymouth)
- Robbinsdale Cooper High School (New Hope)

=== Other facilities ===
- Bus Garage, New Hope
- New Hope Learning Center, New Hope
- Robbinsdale Area Learning Campus (RALC), Robbinsdale
- Crystal Learning Center, Crystal
- Community Education at Pilgrim Lane, Plymouth

== Closed Schools ==
=== Closed Elementary Schools ===
- Cavanagh Elementary (Closed in 1977) Demolished, now apartments. (5400 Corvallis Ave N, Crystal)
- Thorson Elementary (Closed in 1977) Demolished, now housing. (7323 58th Ave N, Crystal)
- Adair Elementary (Later Fair Elementary) [Closed in 1978] Demolished, rebuilt into FAIR School Crystal
- Winnetka Elementary (Closed in 1978) Demolished, now housing. (7940 55th Ave N, Crystal)
- Olson Elementary (Closed in 1980) Now School of Engineering and Arts (SEA)
- Crystal Heights Elementary (Closed in 1981) Now Beacon Academy
- Lee Elementary (Closed in 1981) Demolished, now senior housing. (4400 36th Ave N, Robbinsdale)
- Lincoln Elementary (Closed in 1995) Now Prairie Seeds Academy (6200 W Broadway, Brooklyn Park)
- New Hope Elementary (Closed in 2005) Now New Hope Learning Center
- Pilgrim Lane Elementary (Closed in 2009) Now magnet FAIR School Pilgrim Lane
- Sunny Hallow Elementary (Closed in 2009) Now Robbinsdale Spanish Immersion School (RSI)
- Noble Elementary (Closed in 2026)
- Sonnesyn Elementary (Closed in 2026)

=== Closed Middle Schools ===
- Robbinsdale Junior High (Original Building) [Closed in 1979] Demolished, now housing. [4139 Regent Ave N, Robbinsdale]
- Hosterman Middle School (closed in 2000) Demolished, rebuilt into the North Education Center. [5530 Zealand Ave N, Crystal]
- Robbinsdale Middle School (Closed in 2026)
- FAIR School Crystal (Closed in 2026)

=== Closed High Schools ===
- Robbinsdale High School (Closed in 1982) Transitioned into Robbinsdale Middle School (RMS)

== See also ==
- List of school districts in Minnesota
