= Wayzata Public Schools =

School district in Minnesota, United States

Location
- United States

District information
- Grades: K-12
- Established: 1870
- Superintendent: Robb P. Virgin
- Schools: 13
- Budget: $194,295,000
- NCES District ID: 2742160

Students and staff
- Students: 12,720
- Teachers: 900
- Staff: 1,695
- Student–teacher ratio: 14:1

Other information
- Website: www.wayzataschools.org

Wayzata Public Schools (ISD #284) is a public school district in the northwestern area of Hennepin County, Minnesota, U.S. serving all or part of the cities of Corcoran, Maple Grove, Medicine Lake, Medina, Minnetonka, Orono, Plymouth, and Wayzata.

Wayzata Public Schools is made up of nine elementary schools (K-5), three middle schools (6-8) and one high school (9-12). The district also has a community education department and an early learning school.

The superintendent of Wayzata Public Schools is Dr. Chace B. Anderson. The approximate enrollment for the 2021-2022 school year is 12,720 students. The district employs more than 1,695 employees including almost 900 teaching positions. The district operates with a total expenditure budget for the 2018-2019 school year of more than $194 million, which includes about $163 million for the general operations of the schools. It is one of only two districts in the state to be given a AAA bond rating by S&P and Moody’s Investor Services. Wayzata Public Schools is rated #1 in Minnesota by Niche.

Despite the district's name, only one school, West Middle School, is located in the City of Wayzata; every other school is located in the City of Plymouth. The majority of the district lies to the north of Wayzata in the city of Plymouth. The West Middle School building at one time housed all grades 7-12 students for the district.

== List of schools ==
- Wayzata High School (3,669 students)
- Central Middle School (1,316 students)
- East Middle School (690 students)
- West Middle School (748 students)
- Birchview Elementary (413 students)
- Gleason Lake Elementary (600 students)
- Greenwood Elementary (721 students)
- Kimberly Lane Elementary (628 students)
- Meadow Ridge Elementary (768 students)
- Oakwood Elementary (458 students)
- Plymouth Creek Elementary (624 students)
- Sunset Hill Elementary (618 students)
- North Woods Elementary (569 students)

=== Wayzata High School ===
Wayzata High School is located at 4955 Peony Lane in Plymouth MN 55446. Scott Gengler is the current principal and the student day is from 8:15 a.m. to 3:20 p.m. The current enrollment is 3,711 students in grades 9 through 12.

The Wayzata High School building was opened in 1997 to replace the former high school which is now Central Middle School. It is located north of Highway 55 in Plymouth at the intersection of Peony Lane and Schmidt Lake Road.

WHS's graduation rate is approximately 98 percent. Typically, 87 percent of graduates plan to attend either two-or four-year colleges and universities.

WHS offers 32 college-level AP courses for students. More than 85 percent of students score three or higher on AP exams, making them eligible for college credit. There are more than 60 co- and extra-curricular activities available at WHS. On statewide tests, more than 90 percent of 10th grade students were proficient on the MCA II reading test and more than 70 percent of 11th grade students were proficient on the MCA II math test. WHS students score consistently higher than state and national averages on the ACT and SAT exams. The WHS average score on the 2016 ACT was 25.8, compared to 22.7 at the state level and 21.1 at the national level. On the SAT, WHS students in 2016 scored an average math score of 710 and an average critical reading score of 667 - compared to 609 and 595 at the state level and 515 and 501 at the national level. In 2018, six students earned perfect scores on the ACT test.

=== Central Middle School ===
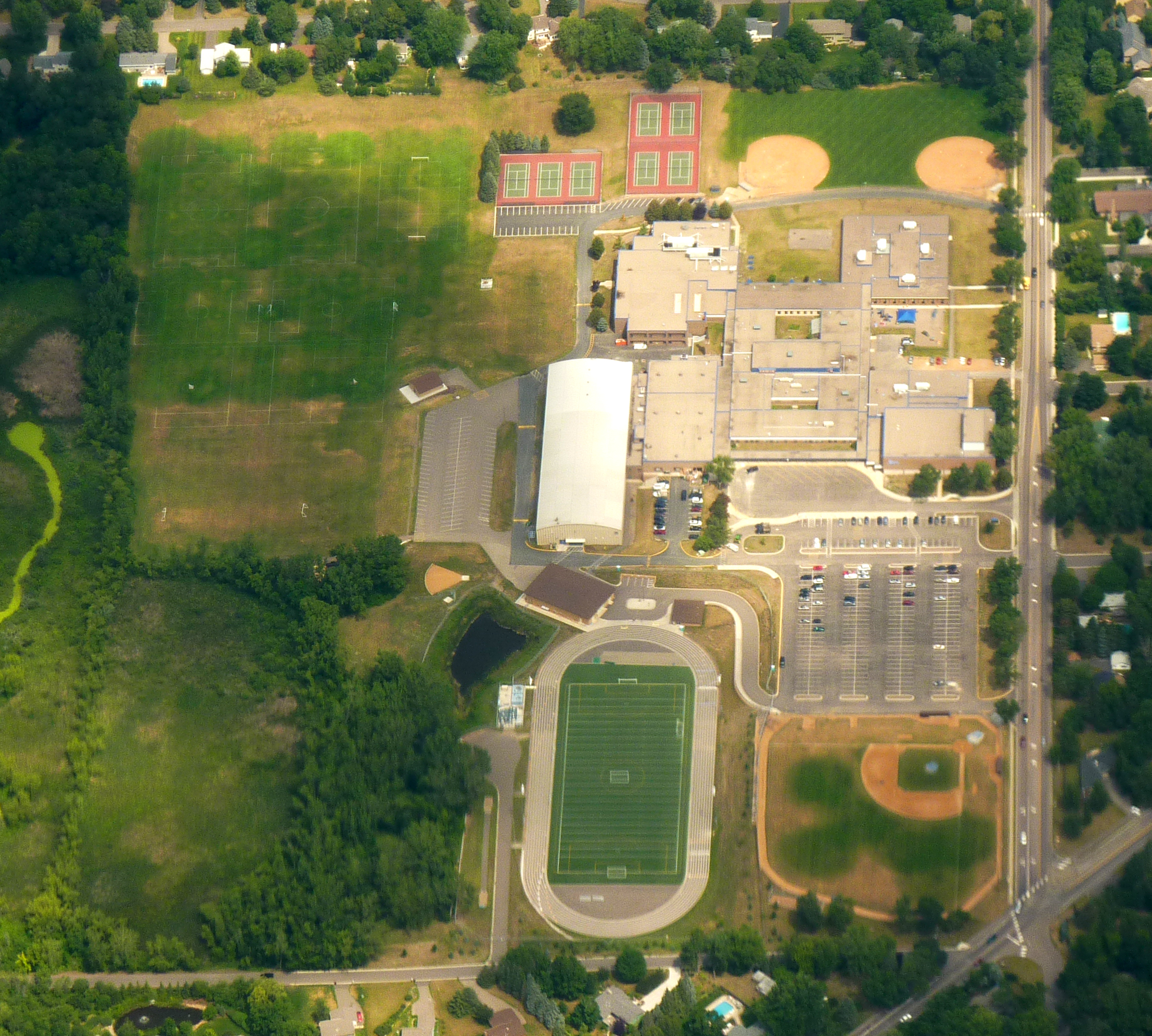
Aerial photo of Wayzata Central Middle School Campus.

Central Middle School is located at 305 Vicksburg Lane in Plymouth MN 55447. The current principal is Marian Boyd and the student day is from 9:05 a.m. to 4:10 p.m. The current enrollment is approximately 1,316 students in grades 6 through 8.

The Central Middle School building was opened in 1961 as the senior high school, serving grades 10-12, and converted to Central Middle School in 1997. It is located on the southeast corner of Gleason Lake at the intersection of Gleason Lake Road and Vicksburg Lane. Despite the fact that the building is in Plymouth, it agreed to keep the name Wayzata High School in exchange for being able to connect Plymouth's water system to Wayzata's.

Each year, students are assigned to one of five "teams": Blue, Gold, Silver, Purple, or Green, although the "Purple" team sometimes isn't present for the specific grade. A student's team determines which teachers they will have.

Students are required to use a "core" schedule that includes math, science, communications, language arts, social studies (including history and geography). In this schedule there is also a “MyTime” period that offers time to read, complete homework, or do other activities, as well as an "advisory" time which offers health education among other activities.

Unlike other Wayzata schools, Central does not have a swimming pool, but has a hockey arena. The arena once hosted Wayzata High School home games when the high school was located at the Central building.

Students in Wayzata middle schools are required to take three years of physical education and a performance-based music course (Band, Choir, Orchestra and Music Ex in 8th grade only) from the Encore department. Students must also take one quarter of engineering, technology and design (ETD), family and consumer science (FACS), art and a world language course in sixth and seventh grades. In eighth grade, students have the opportunity to enroll in two of these four offerings in a more in-depth semester-long course.

In addition to standard curriculum, all Wayzata middle schools offer special services and Vision 21 (gifted) curriculum.

=== East Middle School ===
East Middle School is located at 12000 Ridgemount Avenue West in Plymouth MN 55411. The principal is Meg Bennett and the student day is from 9:05 a.m. to 4:10 p.m. The current enrollment is approximately 822 students in grades 6 through 8.

East Middle School was opened in 1967 and is located approximately one mile east of Xenium Lane on Ridgemount Avenue in Plymouth. It was initially called Ridgemount Junior High School and housed grades 7 through 9 until it was renamed Wayzata East Junior High in the mid-1980s. It converted to a middle school in 1997 after the construction of the current high school.

Middle school students are required to use a "block" schedule that includes math, science, communications, language arts, social studies (including history and geography). In this schedule there is also a "MyTime" period that offers time to read or complete homework, as well as an "advisory" time which offers health education among other activities.

Students in Wayzata middle schools are required to take three years of physical education and a performance-based music course (Band, Choir, Orchestra and Music Ex in 8th grade only) from the Encore department. Students must also take one quarter of engineering, technology and design (ETD), family and consumer science (FACS), art and a world language course in sixth and seventh grades. In eighth grade, students have the opportunity to enroll in two of these four offerings in a more in-depth semester-long course.

In addition to standard curriculum, all Wayzata middle schools offer special services and Vision 21 (gifted and talented) curriculum.

=== West Middle School ===
West Middle School is located at 149 Barry Avenue North in Wayzata MN 55391. The principal is Ryan Carlson and the student day is from 9:10 a.m. to 4:00 p.m. The current enrollment is approximately 748 students in grades 6 through 8.

The West Middle School building was opened in 1951 as a junior/senior high school, housing grades 7-12 and was converted to Wayzata Junior High School in 1961, housing grades 7-9. The name was eventually modified to Wayzata West Junior High School when Ridgemount Junior High became Wayzata East Junior High School in the mid-1980s. It became a middle school, housing grades 6-8, in 1997. It is located at the intersection of Barry Avenue and Wayzata Boulevard in Wayzata.

Middle school students are required to use a "core" schedule that includes math, science, communications, language arts, social studies (including history and geography). In this schedule there is also a "flex" period that offers time to read or complete homework, as well as an "advisory" time which offers health education among other activities.

Students in Wayzata middle schools are required to take three years of physical education and a performance-based music course (Band, Choir, Orchestra and Music Ex in 8th grade only) from the Encore department. Students must also take one quarter of engineering, technology and design (ETD), family and consumer science (FACS), art and a world language course in sixth and seventh grades. In eighth grade, students have the opportunity to enroll in two of these four offerings in a more in-depth semester-long course.

In addition to standard curriculum, all Wayzata middle schools offer special services and Vision 21 (gifted) curriculum.

=== Kimberly Lane Elementary School ===
Kimberly Lane Elementary School is located at 17405 Old Rockford Rd in Plymouth, Minnesota just outside of Minneapolis-St. Paul. The student school day is from 7:45 am to 2:25 pm. The elementary school is a part of the Wayzata Public Schools and has approximately 628 students in grades K-5 (2021–22). The school is represented by students and families from diverse backgrounds that include 20 different countries. Dr. Kari Wehrmann is the Principal and the school mascot is the coyote. The school was opened in 1991.

=== Oakwood Elementary School ===
Oakwood Elementary School is located at 17340 County Road 6 in Plymouth, Minnesota. The student school day is from 7:45 am to 2:25 pm. The elementary school is a part of the Wayzata Public Schools and has approximately 458 students in grades K-5 (2021–22). They were named 2017 national blue ribbon school and Oakwood students represent over 30 countries and 17 languages. Sarabeth deNeui is the Principal and the school mascot is the bald eagle. Oakwood Elementary was built on the corner of County Road 6 and County Road 101 in 1958. An expansion to the school, including a new gymnasium, was completed in 2020.

=== Plymouth Creek Elementary School ===
Plymouth Creek Elementary School is located at 16005 41st Avenue North in Plymouth, Minnesota. The elementary school is a part of the Wayzata Public Schools and has approximately 675 students in grades K-5 (2024-2025). Their principal is Ashley Paul and their mascot is the panther. For the first two weeks of the school's existence, the mascot was the mallard. Plymouth Creek Elementary was built near the corner of Vicksburg Lane and Old Rockford Road in 1988.

=== Sunset Hill Elementary School ===
Sunset Hill Elementary School is located at 3005 Sunset Trail in Plymouth, Minnesota. The student school day is from 8:30 am to 3:10 pm. The elementary school is a part of the Wayzata Public Schools and has approximately 618 students in grades K-5 (2021–22). Their Principal is Ross Williams. Sunset Hill Elementary was built in southeast Plymouth in 1963.

=== Greenwood Elementary School ===
Greenwood Elementary School is located at 18005 Medina Road in Plymouth, Minnesota. The student school day is from 7:45 am to 2:25 pm. The elementary school is a part of the Wayzata Public Schools and has approximately 721 students in grades K-5 (2021–22). Their Principal is Dr. Brad Gustafson and their mascot is the grizzly bear. Greenwood Elementary was built in west Plymouth at the corner of Highway 101 and Medina Road in 1965.

=== Birchview Elementary School ===
Birchview Elementary School is located at 425 Ranchview Way in Plymouth, Minnesota. The student school day is from 8:30 am to 3:10 pm. The elementary school is a part of the Wayzata Public Schools and has approximately 413 students in grades K-5 (2021–22). It was named a Blue Ribbon school in 2016. Their Principal is Ashley Farrington and their mascot is the bobcat. Birchview Elementary was built in 1970 near Central Middle School in southern Plymouth.

=== Gleason Lake Elementary School ===
Gleason Lake Elementary School is located at 310 County Road 101, adjacent to the Wayzata Public Schools Administration offices, in Plymouth, Minnesota. The student school day is from 8:30 am to 3:10 pm. The elementary school is a part of the Wayzata Public Schools and has approximately 600 students in grades K-5 (2021–22). They have multiple clubs available after school for students. Their Principal is Mary McKasy and their mascot is the alligator. Gleason Lake Elementary was built in west Plymouth at the corner of County Road 101 and the Luce Line State Trail in 1989.

=== Meadow Ridge Elementary School ===
Meadow Ridge Elementary School is located at 17905 County Road 47 in Plymouth, Minnesota. The elementary school is a part of the Wayzata Public Schools and has a diverse student body of approximately 768 students in grades K-5 (2021–22). The student school day is from 7:45 am to 2:25 pm. Like many of the district's elementary schools, they celebrate this diversity each winter with a culture week or night. Their Principal is Karen Keffler and their mascot is the cardinal. Meadow Ridge Elementary was built in northwest Plymouth in 2016 and received a 10 classroom addition in 2018.

=== North Woods Elementary School ===
North Woods Elementary School is located at 18995 54th Ave N, off of County Road 101, and north of Highway 55 in Plymouth, Minnesota. The school was opened in the fall of 2019 after a 2017 voter referendum. Its design is similar to that of Meadow Ridge Elementary School, with a student body of approximately 569 students in grades K-5 (2021–22). The student school day is from 7:45 am to 2:25 pm. Their principal is Jenny Berg and their mascot is the wolf.

== Former schools ==
=== Widsten School: 1921-1989 ===
The Widsten School, located on School House Hill in Wayzata overlooking Lake Minnetonka, opened in 1921 as the Wayzata Consolidated School housing all grades K-12. In 1951, with the construction of what is now West Middle School, the building was converted to a K-6 elementary school, the second elementary school in the district after Beacon Heights. In 1953, it was renamed Widsten School in honor of principal Halvor Widsten, who had died suddenly earlier that year. In the 1980s, the school needed to be brought up to code, but it was determined that the cost would be too high relative to the cost of selling the school to residential developers and building a newer larger school at a different location. The district closed the school in the fall of 1989 and all students were moved to the newly opened Gleason Lake Elementary School on October 30. The media center at Gleason Lake was named the Widsten Learning Center in tribute. The school was designed in a Pueblo Revival style by architect Edwin Hawley Hewitt, unique for the area, and attempts were made to save the building from demolition by having it declared an historic landmark. However, in 1993, it was demolished and replaced with townhomes.

=== Beacon Heights Elementary School: 1946-1982 ===
The Beacon Heights School was built in 1940 to house all students in the Beacon Heights District 95, serving parts of Plymouth and all of Medicine Lake. In 1946, the Beacon Heights District consolidated with the Wayzata School District and the Beacon Heights School became the first K-6 elementary school to serve Wayzata Public Schools. Several additions were made to the original building over the years to serve the growing population. In 1982, the district closed the school. The building currently houses a childcare and preschool facility. U.S. Senator Amy Klobuchar attended Beacon Heights Elementary School and was sent home in 4th grade for wearing pants.

== Demographics ==
The student body in the district, based on enrollment, includes the following:

- White - 70.1%
- Asian - 14.1%
- Black - 7.1%
- Hispanic - 4.3%
- Multiracial - 4.3%
- Native American - 0.1%
- Students receiving free/reduced lunch - 13.1%
- Students receiving special education services - 9.81%
- English Language Learner students - 2.5%

== See also ==
- List of school districts in Minnesota
