= Hopkins Public Schools (Minnesota) =

School district in Minnesota, United States

Hopkins School District 270 is a public school district in the U.S. state of Minnesota. The district is one of the larger districts in the state, and covers all of Hopkins, Minnesota as well as parts of Minnetonka, Golden Valley, Eden Prairie, Edina, Plymouth, Minneapolis, and St. Louis Park. The district is strong athletically, having won numerous state championships. Both boys' and girls' basketball are particularly strong, having won multiple state titles. Hopkins School District offers a K-12 Mandarin Chinese immersion program, which attracts students from within the district and from other school districts.

== History ==
In 1980 the Golden Valley School District merged into the Hopkins district. Under Minnesota law it was a consolidation. The Hopkins district transitioned its junior highs to middle schools at the start of the 2023 school years. Sixth graders were moved to the middle schools and ninth grade to high school.

== Schools ==
=== Early Childhood School (Pre-K) ===
- Harley Hopkins Early Childhood Center

=== Elementary Schools (K–5) ===
- Meadowbrook Elementary School
- Tanglen Elementary School
- Alice Smith Elementary School
- Gatewood Elementary School
- Glen Lake Elementary School
- Eisenhower Elementary School
- XinXing Academy- Chinese immersion school (Linked with and sharing the same building as Eisenhower Elementary School.)

=== Middle schools (6–8) ===
- Hopkins North Middle School
- Hopkins West Middle School: in 2007-08 it educated around 900 students in grades seven to nine. Hopkins West was awarded the Blue Ribbon School of Excellence in 1983-84. It was the first middle school in Minnesota to receive this honor. The National Association of Secondary School Principals, in 2004, included Hopkins West as one of the '100 Highly Effective Middle Level Schools' in the nation. The Knowledge Master Open team was the national junior high quiz champions in the Knowledge Master Open for fall 2008. Currently, the principal of the school is Serita Mattei. The school however has had recent tragedies, including student suicides.

=== High school (9–12) ===
- Hopkins High School
