= 2007–08 Minnesota Golden Gophers men's ice hockey season =

NCAA Tournament, Northeast regional semifinal
- Conference: 7th WCHA
- Home ice: Mariucci Arena

Rankings
- USA Today: #11
- USCHO.com: #10

Record
- Overall: 19–17–9
- Conference: 9–12–7
- Home: 9–8–3
- Road: 6–7–6
- Neutral: 4–2–0

Coaches and captains
- Head coach: Don Lucia
- Captain: Derek Peltier
- Alternate captain(s): Mike Howe; Evan Kaufmann; Ryan Stoa; Blake Wheeler

The 2007–08 Minnesota Golden Gophers men's ice hockey team represented the University of Minnesota in the 2007–08 NCAA Division I men's ice hockey season. The team was coached by Don Lucia and played their home games at Mariucci Arena. This season was the second time during Lucia's tenure where all the players were from the state of Minnesota.

== Roster ==
As of March 24, 2008.

Goaltenders
| # | State | Player | Catches | Year | Hometown (Previous School) | Previous Team |
| 1 | (Minnesota) | Jeff Frazee | L | Junior | Burnsville, MN (Academy of Holy Angels) | USNDT - NAHL |
| 33 | (Minnesota) | Alex Kangas | L | Freshman | Rochester, MN (Rochester Century High School) | Indiana - USHL |
| 35 | (Minnesota) | Brent Solei | L | Senior | Coon Rapids, MN (Elk River High School) | Fairbanks - NAHL |

Defensemen
| # | State | Player | Shoots | Year | Hometown (Previous School) | Previous Team |
| 2 | (Minnesota) | Kevin Wehrs | L | Freshman | Plymouth, MN (Wayzata High School) | Cedar Rapids - USHL |
| 4 | (Minnesota) | Stu Bickel | R | Freshman | Chanhassen, MN (Eden Prairie High School) | Sioux Falls - USHL |
| 5 | (Minnesota) | Derek Peltier – C | L | Senior | Plymouth, MN (Robbinsdale Armstrong High School) | Cedar Rapids - USHL |
| 6 | (Minnesota) | R.J. Anderson | R | Junior | Lino Lakes, MN (Centennial High School) |
| 20 | (Minnesota) | David Fischer | R | Sophomore | Apple Valley, MN (Apple Valley High School) |
| 27 | (Minnesota) | Brian Schack | L | Sophomore | Lino Lakes, MN (Totino-Grace High School) | Southern Minnesota - NAHL |
| 28 | (Minnesota) | Cade Fairchild | L | Freshman | Duluth, MN (Duluth East High School) | USNDT - NAHL |

Forwards
| # | State | Player | Shoots | Year | Hometown (Previous School) | Previous Team |
| 7 | (Minnesota) | Patrick White | R | Freshman | Grand Rapids, MN (Grand Rapids High School) | Tri-City - USHL |
| 11 | (Minnesota) | Mike Hoeffel | L | Freshman | North Oaks, MN (Hill-Murray High School) | USNDT - NAHL |
| 12 | (Minnesota) | Tony Lucia | L | Sophomore | Plymouth, MN (Wayzata High School) | Omaha - USHL |
| 13 | (Minnesota) | Ben Gordon | L | Senior | International Falls, MN (Falls High School) | Lincoln - USHL |
| 14 | (Minnesota) | Justin Bostrom | R | Junior | Vadnais Heights, MN (Mounds View High School) | Sioux City - USHL |
| 16 | (Minnesota) | Mike Carman | L | Sophomore | Apple Valley, MN (Academy of Holy Angels) | USNDT - NAHL |
| 17 | (Minnesota) | Blake Wheeler – A | R | Junior | Plymouth, MN (Breck School) | Green Bay - USHL |
| 19 | (Minnesota) | Evan Kaufmann – A | R | Senior | Plymouth, MN (Robbinsdale Armstrong High School) | River City - USHL |
| 21 | (Minnesota) | Tom Pohl | L | Senior | Red Wing, MN (Red Wing High School) | Tri-City - USHL |
| 22 | (Minnesota) | Ryan Flynn | R | Sophomore | Lino Lakes, MN (Centennial High School) | USNDT - NAHL |
| 24 | (Minnesota) | Mike Howe – A | R | Senior | St. Cloud, MN (St. Cloud Apollo High School) | River City - USHL |
| 25 | (Minnesota) | Drew Fisher | L | Freshman | International Falls, MN (Moorhead High School) | Sioux Falls - USHL |
| 26 | (Minnesota) | Jay Barriball | R | Sophomore | Prior Lake, MN (Academy of Holy Angels) | Sioux Falls - USHL |
| 29 | (Minnesota) | Ryan Stoa – A | L | Junior | Bloomington, MN (Bloomington Kennedy High School) | USNDT - NAHL |

Junior forward Ryan Stoa suffered a knee injury during the team's October 13, 2007 win over Michigan. He missed the remainder of the season. Sophomore forward Kyle Okposo left the team on December 19, 2007 to sign with the New York Islanders. Senior defenseman Tom Pohl suffered a skull fracture during the team's WCHA first round playoff series with Minnesota State, ending his hockey career.

== Season standings ==
Note: PTS = Points; GP = Games played; W = Wins; L = Losses; T = Ties; GF = Goals for; GA = Goals against

2007–08 Western Collegiate Hockey Association standings
| | Conference | | | | | | | Overall | | | | | |
| | GP | W | L | T | PTS | GF | GA | GP | W | L | T | GF | GA |
|---|---|---|---|---|---|---|---|---|---|---|---|---|---|
| #8 Colorado College† | 28 | 21 | 6 | 1 | 43 | 95 | 52 | 41 | 28 | 12 | 1 | 136 | 88 |
| #4 North Dakota | 28 | 18 | 7 | 3 | 39 | 85 | 53 | 43 | 28 | 11 | 4 | 129 | 80 |
| #9 Denver* | 28 | 16 | 11 | 1 | 33 | 75 | 67 | 41 | 26 | 14 | 1 | 116 | 94 |
| #15 Minnesota State | 28 | 12 | 12 | 4 | 28 | 71 | 75 | 39 | 19 | 16 | 4 | 106 | 97 |
| #14 St. Cloud State | 28 | 12 | 12 | 4 | 28 | 79 | 74 | 40 | 19 | 16 | 5 | 118 | 94 |
| #13 Wisconsin | 28 | 11 | 12 | 5 | 27 | 68 | 68 | 40 | 16 | 17 | 7 | 114 | 102 |
| #12 Minnesota | 28 | 9 | 12 | 7 | 25 | 64 | 70 | 45 | 19 | 17 | 9 | 109 | 109 |
| Minnesota–Duluth | 28 | 9 | 14 | 5 | 23 | 55 | 76 | 36 | 13 | 17 | 6 | 74 | 91 |
| Michigan Tech | 28 | 9 | 15 | 4 | 22 | 55 | 77 | 39 | 14 | 20 | 5 | 78 | 99 |
| Alaska–Anchorage | 28 | 3 | 19 | 6 | 12 | 54 | 89 | 36 | 7 | 21 | 8 | 81 | 112 |
Championship: Denver † indicates conference regular season champion * indicates conference tournament champion Final rankings: USA Today/USA Hockey Magazine Top 15 Poll

== Regular season ==
| # | Date | Opponent^{#} | Rank^{#} | Site | Score | Goaltender | Record | Points |
|---|---|---|---|---|---|---|---|---|
| 1 | October 12*^{†} | vs. RPI | #6 | Xcel Energy Center • St. Paul, MN | 4–3 | Frazee | 1–0–0 | — |
| 2 | October 13*^{†} | vs. #9 Michigan | #6 | Xcel Energy Center • St. Paul, MN | 4–3 | Frazee | 2–0–0 | — |
| 3 | October 19 | @ #10 Colorado College | #3 | World Arena • Colorado Springs, CO | 1–3 | Frazee | 2–1–0 | 0 |
| 4 | October 20 | @ #10 Colorado College | #3 | World Arena • Colorado Springs, CO | 1–2 (OT) | Frazee | 2–2–0 | 0 |
| 5 | October 25* | #14 Ohio State | #10 | Mariucci Arena • Minneapolis, MN | 3–1 | Frazee | 3–2–0 | — |
| 6 | October 26* | #14 Ohio State | #10 | Mariucci Arena • Minneapolis, MN | 2–1 | Kangas | 4–2–0 | — |
| 7 | October 27* | U.S. Under-18 Team (exh.) | #10 | Mariucci Arena • Minneapolis, MN | 3–1 | Solei | 4–2–0 | — |
| 8 | November 2 | #7 Denver | #8 | Mariucci Arena • Minneapolis, MN | 1–5 | Frazee | 4–3–0 | 0 |
| 9 | November 4 | #7 Denver | #8 | Mariucci Arena • Minneapolis, MN | 1–4 | Kangas | 4–4–0 | 0 |
| 10 | November 9 | @ Minnesota State | #14 | Alltel Center • Mankato, MN | 4–3 | Frazee | 5–4–0 | 2 |
| 11 | November 10 | Minnesota State | #14 | Mariucci Arena • Minneapolis, MN | 5–3 | Kangas | 6–4–0 | 4 |
| 12 | November 16 | Alaska Anchorage | #12 | Mariucci Arena • Minneapolis, MN | 3–0 | Frazee | 7–4–0 | 6 |
| 13 | November 17 | Alaska Anchorage | #12 | Mariucci Arena • Minneapolis, MN | 2–4 | Frazee | 7–5–0 | 6 |
| 14 | November 23*^{‡} | @ #6 Michigan State | #15 | Munn Ice Arena • East Lansing, MI | 3–3 (OT) | Kangas | 7–5–1 | — |
| 15 | November 24*^{‡} | @ #2 Michigan | #15 | Yost Ice Arena • Ann Arbor, MI | 1–5 | Frazee | 7–6–1 | — |
| 16 | November 30 | Michigan Tech | — | Mariucci Arena • Minneapolis, MN | 2–3 (OT) | Kangas | 7–7–1 | 6 |
| 17 | December 1 | Michigan Tech | — | Mariucci Arena • Minneapolis, MN | 3–1 | Frazee | 8–7–1 | 8 |
| 18 | December 7 | @ #8 North Dakota | — | Ralph Engelstad Arena • Grand Forks, ND | 2–4 | Frazee | 8–8–1 | 8 |
| 19 | December 8 | @ #8 North Dakota | — | Ralph Engelstad Arena • Grand Forks, ND | 4–3 | Kangas | 9–8–1 | 10 |
| 20 | December 29*^{$} | RIT | #12 | Mariucci Arena • Minneapolis, MN | 3–4 | Frazee | 9–9–1 | — |
| 21 | December 30*^{$} | Air Force | #12 | Mariucci Arena • Minneapolis, MN | 2–2 (OT)^{Ħ} | Kangas | 9–9–2 | — |
| 22 | January 4* | Wayne State | #12 | Mariucci Arena • Minneapolis, MN | 5–1 | Solei | 10–9–2 | — |
| 23 | January 5* | Wayne State | #12 | Mariucci Arena • Minneapolis, MN | 5–2 | Kangas | 11–9–2 | — |
| 24 | January 11 | #15 St. Cloud State | #14 | Mariucci Arena • Minneapolis, MN | 1–3 | Kangas | 11–10–2 | 10 |
| 25 | January 12 | @ #15 St. Cloud State | #14 | National Hockey Center • St. Cloud, MN | 4–4 (OT) | Frazee | 11–10–3 | 11 |
| 26 | January 18 | @ Minnesota Duluth | — | Duluth Entertainment Convention Center • Duluth, MN | 1–1 (OT) | Kangas | 11–10–4 | 12 |
| 27 | January 19 | @ Minnesota Duluth | — | Duluth Entertainment Convention Center • Duluth, MN | 2–1 | Kangas | 12–10–4 | 14 |
| 28 | January 25 | @ Wisconsin | — | Kohl Center • Madison, WI | 1–3 | Kangas | 12–11–4 | 14 |
| 29 | January 26 | @ Wisconsin | — | Kohl Center • Madison, WI | 2–2 (OT) | Kangas | 12–11–5 | 15 |
| 30 | February 1 | #3 North Dakota | #15 | Mariucci Arena • Minneapolis, MN | 1–2 (OT) | Kangas | 12–12–5 | 15 |
| 31 | February 2 | #3 North Dakota | #15 | Mariucci Arena • Minneapolis, MN | 1–1 (OT) | Kangas | 12–12–6 | 16 |
| 32 | February 8 | @ #7 Denver | — | Magness Arena • Denver, CO | 1–1 (OT) | Kangas | 12–12–7 | 17 |
| 33 | February 9 | @ #7 Denver | — | Magness Arena • Denver, CO | 1–4 | Kangas | 12–13–7 | 17 |
| 34 | February 22 | #12 Wisconsin | — | Mariucci Arena • Minneapolis, MN | 4–2 | Kangas | 13–13–7 | 19 |
| 35 | February 23 | #12 Wisconsin | — | Mariucci Arena • Minneapolis, MN | 4–4 (OT) | Kangas | 13–13–8 | 20 |
| 36 | February 29 | @ Alaska Anchorage | — | Sullivan Arena • Anchorage, AK | 1–1 (OT) | Kangas | 13–13–9 | 21 |
| 37 | March 1 | @ Alaska Anchorage | — | Sullivan Arena • Anchorage, AK | 4–1 | Kangas | 14–13–9 | 23 |
| 38 | March 7 | Minnesota Duluth | #14 | Mariucci Arena • Minneapolis, MN | 4–1 | Kangas | 15–13–9 | 25 |
| 39 | March 8 | Minnesota Duluth | #14 | Mariucci Arena • Minneapolis, MN | 2–3 | Kangas | 15–14–9 | 25 |
*Non-Conference Game. ^{†}IceBreaker Invitational. ^{‡}College Hockey Showcase. ^{$}Dodge Holiday Classic. ^{Ħ}Shootout Win 2–0 (4 rounds)^{#}Rankings from USA Today/USA Hockey Magazine poll released prior to games.

== Postseason ==
=== WCHA Playoffs ===
| # | Date | Opponent^{#} | Rank^{#} | Site | Score | Goaltender | Record |
|---|---|---|---|---|---|---|---|
| 1 | March 14* | #10 Minnesota State | #15 | Alltel Center • Mankato, MN | 0–1 (2OT) | Kangas | 15–15–9 |
| 2 | March 15* | #10 Minnesota State | #15 | Alltel Center • Mankato, MN | 2–1 (OT) | Kangas | 16–15–9 |
| 3 | March 16* | #10 Minnesota State | #15 | Alltel Center • Mankato, MN | 3–2 (2OT) | Kangas | 17–15–9 |
| 4 | March 20^{†} | #8 St. Cloud State | #12 | Xcel Energy Center • St. Paul, MN | 3–2 | Kangas | 18–15–9 |
| 5 | March 21^{‡} | #2 Colorado College | #12 | Xcel Energy Center • St. Paul, MN | 2–1 (OT) | Kangas | 19–15–9 |
| 6 | March 22^{$} | #6 Denver | #12 | Xcel Energy Center • St. Paul, MN | 1–2 | Kangas | 19–16–9 |
*WCHA First-Round (best of three). ^{†}WCHA Final Five Quarterfinal. ^{‡}WCHA Final Five Semifinal. ^{$}WCHA Final Five Championship.^{#}Rankings from USA Today/American Hockey Coaches Association poll released prior to games.

=== NCAA Playoffs ===
| # | Date | Opponent^{#} | Rank^{#} | Site | Score | Goaltender | Record |
|---|---|---|---|---|---|---|---|
| 1 | March 29* | #7 Boston College | #11 | DCU Center • Worcester, MA | 2–5 | Kangas | 19–17–9 |
*NCAA First-Round (Northeast Regional).^{#}Rankings from USA Today/American Hockey Coaches Association poll released prior to games.

== Season Stats ==
=== Scoring Leaders ===
Note: GP = Games played; G = Goals; A = Assists; Pts = Points; PIM = Penalty minutes

| Player | GP | G | A | Pts | PIM |
|---|---|---|---|---|---|
| Blake Wheeler | 31 | 13 | 13 | 26 | 60 |
| Ben Gordon | 32 | 10 | 12 | 22 | 16 |
| Jay Barriball | 31 | 3 | 13 | 16 | 28 |
| Mike Hoeffel | 32 | 6 | 6 | 12 | 16 |
| Evan Kaufmann | 32 | 5 | 7 | 12 | 46 |
| R.J. Anderson | 32 | 5 | 7 | 12 | 24 |
| Mike Howe | 29 | 4 | 8 | 12 | 4 |
| David Fischer | 32 | 2 | 10 | 12 | 14 |

=== Goaltending ===
Note: GP = Games played; TOI = Time on ice (minutes); W = Wins; L = Losses; GA = Goals against; SO = Shutouts; Sv% = Save percentage; GAA = Goals against average

| Player | GP | TOI | W | L | SO | Sv% | GAA |
|---|---|---|---|---|---|---|---|
| Alex Kangas | 18 | 1095 | 5 | 6 | 0 | .923 | 2.14 |
| Jeff Frazee | 14 | 798 | 6 | 7 | 1 | .890 | 2.93 |
| Brent Solei | 1 | 60 | 1 | 0 | 0 | .966 | 1.00 |

== Awards and records ==
=== Awards ===
==== WCHA ====
- All-WCHA Third Team: Blake Wheeler
- All-Rookie Team: Cade Fairchild
