= Robbinsdale Armstrong High School =

Public secondary school in Minnesota, US

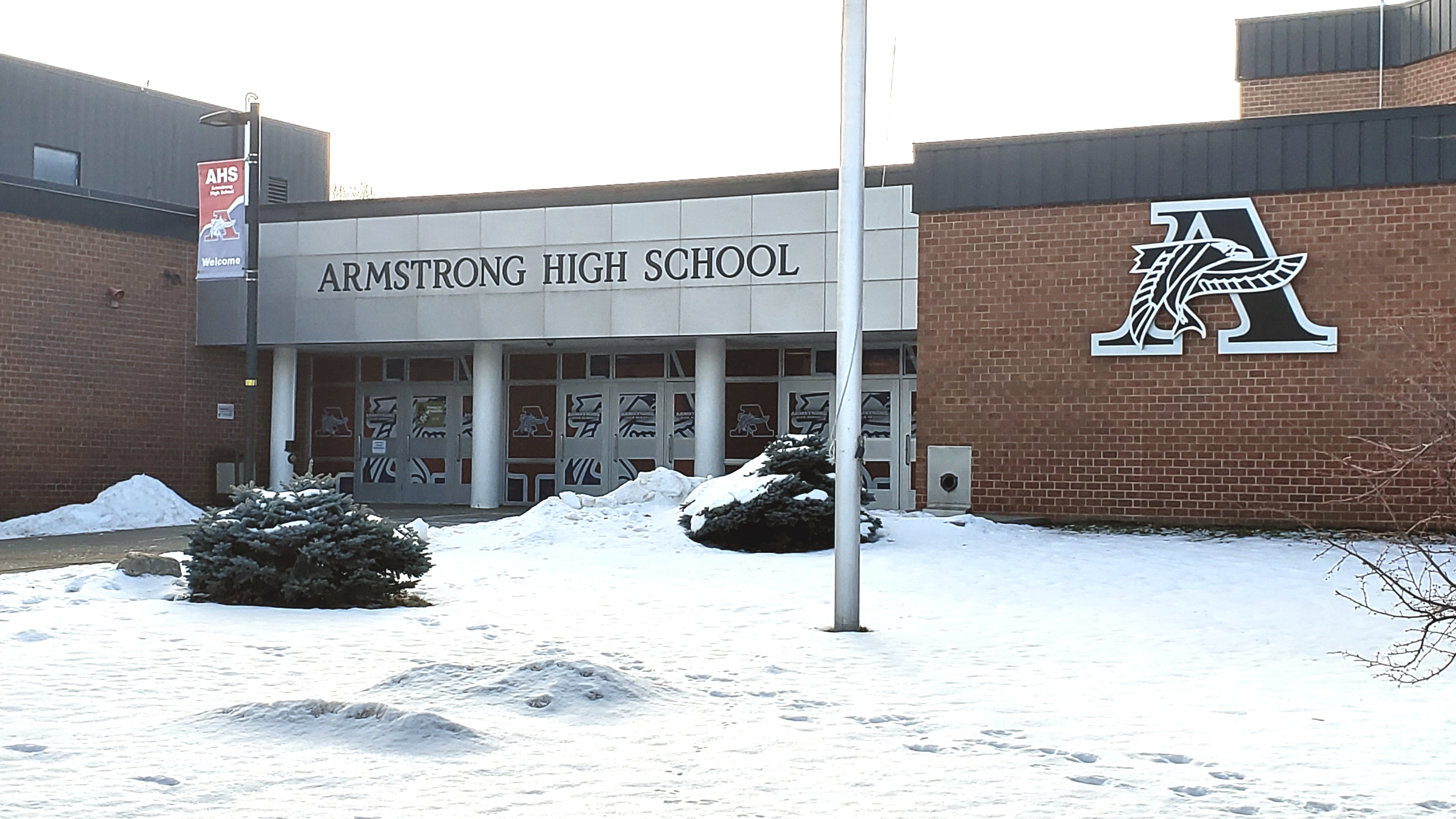

Location
- 10635 36th Avenue North; Plymouth, Minnesota; United States; 45°01′12″N 93°25′02″W

Information
- Type: Public secondary
- Established: 1970
- School district: Robbinsdale Area Schools
- Head teacher: Eric Norby
- Teaching staff: 77.54 (FTE)
- Enrollment: 1,784 (2023–2024)
- Student to teacher ratio: 23.01
- Mascot: Freddy The Falcon
- Colors: Red, white, and blue
- Website: ahs.rdale.org

Robbinsdale Armstrong High School (AHS; full name Robbinsdale Neil A. Armstrong Senior High School) is in Plymouth, Minnesota, just outside Minneapolis. The school serves students from Plymouth, Robbinsdale, Crystal, New Hope, and Golden Valley.

The school offers core subjects as well as technology education, physical education, and the fine arts. Newsweek ranked the school 1324th on its "List of the 1500 Top High Schools in America" and The Washington Post ranked it #11 in Minnesota. Armstrong, along with the Robbinsdale Area School District, have also been ranked among the "100 Best Communities for Music Education" by the American Music Conference.

The school's athletic programs have made it to state competitions many times. School tradition maintains that the school's rival is Robbinsdale Cooper. Robbinsdale Armstrong and Robbinsdale Cooper serve the district's more than 4,000 secondary-school students.

== Facilities ==
Robbinsdale Armstrong High School was built in 1969 and has undergone several renovations and upgrades since its construction, with the most recent major renovation finished in 2003. The campus has four interconnected buildings with four stories. The grounds contain a varsity and a junior varsity football field, two baseball fields, several enclosed tennis courts, and a track around the football field.

== Athletics and activities ==
Armstrong was once a member of the Classic Lake Conference but was voted out of the conference in 2010 due to declining enrollment and admitted to the Northwest Suburban Conference.

State Team Championships
Season	Sport	Number of Championships	Year
Fall	Soccer, Boys	2	1979 and 2003(AA)
Fall	Cross country, Boys	1	1974
Fall	Cross country, Girls	2	1976 and 1978
Fall	Volleyball, Girls	7	80(AA), 81(AA), 82(AA), 83(AA), 84(AA), 00(AAA), 02(AAA)
Fall	Adapted Soccer, Coed	11	1995, 2005, 08, 09, 10, 11, 12, 13, 14, 21, 23
Winter	Nordic skiing, Boys	1	1980
Winter	Gymnastics, Girls	2	1976, 1983
Winter	Gymnastics, Boys	7	1972, 1973, 1974, 1975, 1976, 1977, 1982
Winter	Adapted Floor Hockey, Coed	11	1994, 95, 96, 2001, 02, 09, 11, 12, 13, 14, 15
Spring	Softball, Girls	1	2001(AAA)
Spring	Track and Field, Boys	2	1985(AA) and 2002(AA)
Spring	Adapted Softball, Coed	12	1995, 2002, 03, 07, 09, 10, 11, 12, 13, 14, 17, 18
Total		59	

State Finearts Championships
Season	Activity	Number of Championships	Year
Winter	Lincoln-Douglas Debate	2	2013 & 2014

The Falcons rivalries include the Cooper Hawks, Hopkins Royals, and the Wayzata Trojans.

Robbinsdale has the most championships among any team in Adapted Soccer, Floor Hockey, and Softball in the PI Division (which is for Physically Impaired students), they also have a CI Division team (for Cognitively Impaired students), both of which are co-ops with Robbinsdale Cooper, Hopkins, and Mound Westonka High School

== Notable alumni ==
- Lucinda Anderson, member, U.S. Olympic biathlon team
- Ryan Bauer-Walsh, actor, singer, and visual artist
- Mo Collins, comedian
- Tom Dooher, former president, Education Minnesota,
- David Gilreath, National Football League player
- Chad Hartman, radio host, son of Star Tribune reporter Sid Hartman
- Ember Reichgott Junge, politician
- Evan Kaufmann (born 1984), professional ice hockey player
- Jordan Leopold, professional hockey player
- Douglas McCain, jihadist, killed in Syria.
- Mark Merila, professional baseball player
- Everette Pedescleaux, NFL player
- Derek Peltier, professional hockey player
- Todd Richards, professional hockey player and coach
- Travis Richards, hockey player for the University of Minnesota
- Jeff Schuh, NFL player
- Leah Thorvilson, distance runner
- Bee Vang, actor
- Dennis Vaske, professional hockey player
