= Minnesota State Highway 218 =

Highway in Minnesota

Trunk Highway 218
- MN 218 highlighted in red over a modern map

Route information
- Maintained by MnDOT
- Length: 189 mi (304 km)
- Existed: 1933–1961

Major junctions
- South end: US 65 in Owatonna
- North end: CR 3 in Merrifield

Location
- Country: United States
- State: Minnesota

Highway system
- Minnesota Trunk Highway System; Interstate; US; State; Legislative; Scenic

Minnesota State Highway 218 was a highway that originally ran from U.S. Route 218 in St. Paul to U.S. Route 210 in Brainerd. In 1935, it was extended south to Owatonna along the former route of U.S. 218. Around 1949, it was extended north of Brainerd to Merrifield.

== Route description ==
Highway 218 ran generally north-south, passing through Brainerd, Pierz, Foley, Becker, Big Lake, Elk River, Anoka, Minneapolis, St. Paul, Rosemount, Farmington, Northfield, Faribault, and Owatonna.

It ran concurrent with U.S. Routes 10, 12, and 52 at various points between St. Paul and Becker.

The route ran through the counties of Rice, Dakota, Ramsey, Hennepin, Anoka, Sherburne, Benton, Morrison, and Crow Wing.

== History ==
State Highway 218 was authorized in 1933 from St. Paul to Brainerd. In 1935, U.S. Route 218 was truncated to end in Owatonna, and the MN-218 designation was extended along this route.

In 1949, it was extended north of Brainerd to the town of Merrifield.

The route was decommissioned in 1961. The bulk of the road south of St. Paul became State Highway 3, and most of the route north of Becker became State Highway 25.

== Major intersections ==
County	Location	mi	km	Destinations	Notes
Steele	Owatonna	0	0.0	US 14 / US 65	Southern end of US 65 overlap
Rice	Walcott Township	10	16	US 65	Northern end of US 65 overlap
Rice	Faribault	15	24	MN 60	
Rice	Faribault	17	27	MN 21	
Rice	Northfield	32	51	MN 19	
Dakota	Farmington	45	72	MN 50	Southern end of MN 50 overlap
Dakota	Farmington	46	74	MN 50	Northern end of MN 50 overlap
Dakota	Wescott	59	95	MN 49	
Dakota		62	100	US 52 / MN 55	Southern end of US 52 overlap
Dakota		66	106	MN 100	
Ramsey	St. Paul	71	114	US 52 (Robert Street) / MN 56 (Concord Street)	Northern end of US 52 overlap
Ramsey	St. Paul			MN 5 (Kellogg Boulevard)	
Ramsey	St. Paul			US 212 (8th Street)	
Ramsey	St. Paul			US 12 / US 52 / MN 56 (University Avenue) / US 10 (Marion Avenue)	Eastern end of US 12 / US 52 / MN 56 overlap
Ramsey	St. Paul			MN 51 (Snelling Avenue)	
Hennepin	Minneapolis			MN 56 (University Avenue)	Western end of MN 56 overlap
Hennepin	Minneapolis			Washington Avenue Bridge over the Mississippi River	
Hennepin	Minneapolis			MN 36 (Cedar Avenue)	
Hennepin	Minneapolis			US 65 south, US 8 north (3rd Avenue S.)	
Hennepin	Minneapolis			US 12 (Hennepin Avenue)	Western end of US 12 overlap
Hennepin	Minneapolis			MN 152 (Washington Avenue)	
Hennepin	Minneapolis			US 169 (Lyndale Avenue)	
Hennepin	Minneapolis			MN 278 (Lowry Avenue)	Southern end of MN 278 overlap
Hennepin	Robbinsdale			MN 278 (36th Avenue N.)	Northern end of MN 278 overlap
Hennepin	Robbinsdale			MN 100	
Hennepin	Brooklyn Park			MN 152	Southern end of MN 152 overlap
Hennepin	Osseo			MN 152	Northern end of MN 152 overlap
Hennepin	Champlin			US 169	Southern end of US 169 overlap
Mississippi River				Anoka–Champlin Mississippi River Bridge	
Anoka	Anoka			US 10 / MN 56	Eastern end of US 10 overlap
Sherburne	Elk River			US 169 north, MN 101 south	Northern end of US 169 overlap
Sherburne	Big Lake			MN 25	
Sherburne	Becker			US 10 / US 52	Western end of US 10 / 52 overlap
Benton	Glendorado Township			MN 95	Eastern end of MN 95 overlap
Benton	St. George Township			MN 95	Western end of MN 95 overlap
Benton	Foley			MN 23	
Morrison	Genola			MN 27	Southern end of MN 27 overlap
Morrison	Buh Township			MN 27	Northern end of MN 27 overlap
Crow Wing	Brainerd			MN 18	
Crow Wing	Brainerd			US 210	
Crow Wing	Brainerd			Mississippi River	
Crow Wing	Merrifield			CR 3	
1.000 mi = 1.609 km; 1.000 km = 0.621 mi: Concurrency terminus
