= Minnesota State Highway 278 =

State highway in Minnesota, United States

Trunk Highway 278
- Former MN 278 highlighted in red

Route information
- Maintained by MnDOT
- Length: 3.573 mi (5.750 km)
- Existed: 1949–1982

Major junctions
- West end: MN 100 at Robbinsdale
- East end: MN 152 at Minneapolis

Location
- Country: United States
- State: Minnesota
- Counties: Hennepin

Highway system
- Minnesota Trunk Highway System; Interstate; US; State; Legislative; Scenic
← MN 277	→ MN 280

Minnesota State Highway 278 (MN 278) was a state highway in Minnesota, originally connecting MN 100 in Robbinsdale to MN 152 in Minneapolis. It existed entirely in Hennepin County. The route was decommissioned in 1982.

== Route description ==
When authorized, Highway 278 began at MN 100 and followed 36th Avenue North along the border of Crystal and Robbinsdale. Upon reaching U.S. Route 52 (West Broadway), it traveled southeast concurrent with 52 and State Highway 218 to Lowry Avenue. It then followed Lowry Avenue east into Minneapolis, crossing U.S. Route 169 at Lyndale Avenue and ending at State Highway 152 (Washington Avenue).

== History ==
MN 278 was authorized in 1949. In 1978, the western terminus was moved to US 52 from the previous MN 100, transferring the 36th Avenue North portion of the route to Robbinsdale city maintenance. In 1982, the remaining section of the route was decommissioned and transferred to county maintenance, becoming part of Hennepin County Road 153.

== Major intersections ==
The entire highway was in Hennepin County.

Location	mi	km	Destinations	Notes
Robbinsdale	0.000	0.000	MN 100	
Robbinsdale	1.144	1.841	US 52 / MN 218	Western end of US 52/MN 218 concurrency
Minneapolis	1.786	2.874	US 52 / MN 218	Eastern end of US 52/MN 218 concurrency
Minneapolis	3.273	5.267	US 169 (Lyndale Avenue)	
Minneapolis	3.573	5.750	MN 152 (Washington Avenue)	
1.000 mi = 1.609 km; 1.000 km = 0.621 mi: Concurrency terminus
