= Tom Dooher =

- Born: 1963 (age 62–63)
- Occupations: Teacher, Labor leader

Tom Dooher (born 1963) is a teacher and labor union activist in the United States, and former president of the 70,000-member teachers union, Education Minnesota, AFT, NEA, AFL-CIO.

== Early life ==
Dooher grew up in Crystal, Minnesota, a suburb of Minneapolis. He graduated from Robbinsdale Armstrong High School in 1981, and received a bachelor's degree from the University of St. Thomas in 1985.

Dooher returned to the Robbinsdale School District, where he grew up and became a middle school physical education teacher and high school coach, overseeing Armstrong's boys' soccer and girls' track and field teams. In 1995, he led his unranked Armstrong Falcons boys' soccer team to the Minnesota state semi-finals, losing on a disputed goal to top-ranked and unbeaten Stillwater.

== Union career ==
Dooher became active in the 1,200-member Robbinsdale Federation of Teachers, AFT, soon after becoming a teacher. In time, he was elected building representative and vice president. He was elected president of the local union in 1997, and resigned his post as a high school soccer coach. While president, he negotiated a contract which included a merit pay proposal.

When the AFT and NEA affiliates in Minnesota proposed merging in 1998, Dooher was a strong proponent of the merged, dually affiliated state federation.

In 2000, Dooher earned a master's degree in education from Hamline University.

In March 2007, Dooher won a contested race to become only the second president in Education Minnesota's history. He succeeded Judy Schaubach, who retired. Dooher took office July 1, 2007 and was re-elected in 2009. He ran for a third term in 2013 and was defeated by Denise Specht. In February 2014, Dooher was hired as executive director of the Arkansas Education Association, AEA. His contract with the AEA was terminated in late September 2014.

Dooher is a strong advocate for higher state funding for education and higher teacher salaries (the starting teacher in Minnesota makes $33,000 a year). He is a strong opponent of school vouchers.

== Grandfather's murder ==
Tom Dooher is a third-generation union member. His father, Bob Dooher, worked at Northwestern Bell and was a member of the Communications Workers of America. His grandfather, Patrick Corcoran, was a Teamsters leader who helped found Teamsters Joint Council 32 and acted as a mediator and liaison between the more radical Teamsters Local 574 (located in Minneapolis, Minnesota) and the national Teamsters unions.

His grandfather was murdered in 1937 for his labor-related activities. His grandfather had returned from a union meeting when one or more assailants attacked him as he walked from the garage to his home. His skull was crushed and he was shot in the head. Law enforcement authorities suspected thugs under the control of Bugs Moran, head of the Chicago Mafia. Moran opposed Corcoran's efforts to organize workers at Walgreens, and had already severely beaten Corcoran several times while warning him to stop organizing workers. The Teamsters declared a holiday for Corcoran's funeral, and the event at the Basilica of St. Mary flowed into the street.

== Notes ==
Preceded by Judy Schaubach	President, Education Minnesota; 2007 - Present	Succeeded by Denise Specht
