= Minnesota State Highway 49 =

State highway in Minnesota, United States

Trunk Highway 49
- MN 49 highlighted in red over a modern map

Route information
- Maintained by MnDOT
- Existed: 1933–1998

Major junctions
- South end: MN 3 in Inver Grove Heights
- MN 55 in Eagan; MN 110 in Mendota Heights; MN 5 in St. Paul; I-94 in St. Paul; MN 36 in Little Canada; I-694 in Shoreview; I-35W in Lino Lakes
- North end: Lino Lakes Correctional Facility

Location
- Country: United States
- State: Minnesota
- Counties: Dakota, Ramsey, Anoka

Highway system
- Minnesota Trunk Highway System; Interstate; US; State; Legislative; Scenic
← MN 48	→ MN 50

Minnesota State Highway 49 was a state highway in Minnesota. It originally followed Rice Street from downtown St. Paul into the northern suburbs of the Twin Cities, shifting a northern termini between Interstate 35W and also the Lino Lakes Correctional Facility. In the late 1990s, the route was cut back to end at Interstate 694 in Shoreview and then fully removed shortly after. Guide signs at the County Road 23 exit from Interstate 35W in Lino Lakes were marked as "OLD 49" for five years after the removal, however these signs were removed around 2003.

== Route description ==
At its greatest length, Highway 49 ran from State Highway 3 (formerly Highway 218) in Inver Grove Heights, continuing north through downtown St. Paul, and ending at the Lino Lakes Correctional Facility.

Highway 49 served as a north–south route between the communities of Inver Grove Heights, Eagan, Mendota Heights, West St. Paul, St. Paul, Maplewood, Roseville, Little Canada, Vadnais Heights, North Oaks, Shoreview, and Lino Lakes.

The route had followed Dodd Road, Smith Avenue, West Seventh Street, St. Peter Street, Wabasha Street, Rice Street, Hodgson Road, Lake Drive, and Lilac Street.

== History ==
Highway 49 was commissioned in 1933, running from State Highway 5 in downtown Saint Paul to then-U.S. Highway 8 in Lino Lakes. In 1950, it was extended over what had been State Highway 88 (present day State Highway 149), across the High Bridge southbound to old State Highway 218 (later renumbered Highway 3) in Inver Grove Heights. When a portion of Interstate 35W was constructed in 1966 and old U.S. 8 was moved to it at Lino Lakes, Highway 49 was then extended north along the former route of U.S. 8 and also replaced old State Highway 326, which served the Lino Lakes Correctional Facility. In 1981, the route south of Highway 5 was renumbered 149 (Smith Avenue and Dodd Road). The remainder of Highway 49 was decommissioned in 1997-1998, the Rice Street and Hodgson Road portions becoming County Road 49, the Lake Drive portion becoming County Road 23, and Lilac Street becoming County Road 153.

== Major intersections ==
The following list includes the major intersections of Highway 49 from 1981 to 1998, when the route was decommissioned.

County	Location	mi	km	Destinations	Notes
Ramsey	St. Paul			MN 5 (West Seventh Street)	Formerly US 212; roadway continued south along present MN 149 before 1981
Ramsey	St. Paul			I-94 (US 12 / US 52) / I-35E	Interchange
Ramsey	St. Paul			CSAH 34 (University Avenue)	Formerly US 12 / US 52 / MN 56 / MN 218; former south end of US 10 overlap
Ramsey	St. Paul			Como Avenue	Former north end of US 10 overlap
Ramsey	St. Paul			CSAH 30 (Larpenteur Avenue)	
Ramsey	Little Canada			MN 36	
Ramsey	Shoreview			I-694	Interchange
Ramsey	Shoreview			MN 96	Formerly overlapped with MN 100
Anoka	Lino Lakes			CSAH 23 (Lake Drive)	Formerly US 8
Anoka	Lino Lakes			I-35W – Minneapolis, Forest Lake	Interchange
Anoka	Lino Lakes			Lino Lakes Correctional Facility	
1.000 mi = 1.609 km; 1.000 km = 0.621 mi
