= Graeser Park =

- Graeser Roadside Parking Area
- U.S. National Register of Historic Places
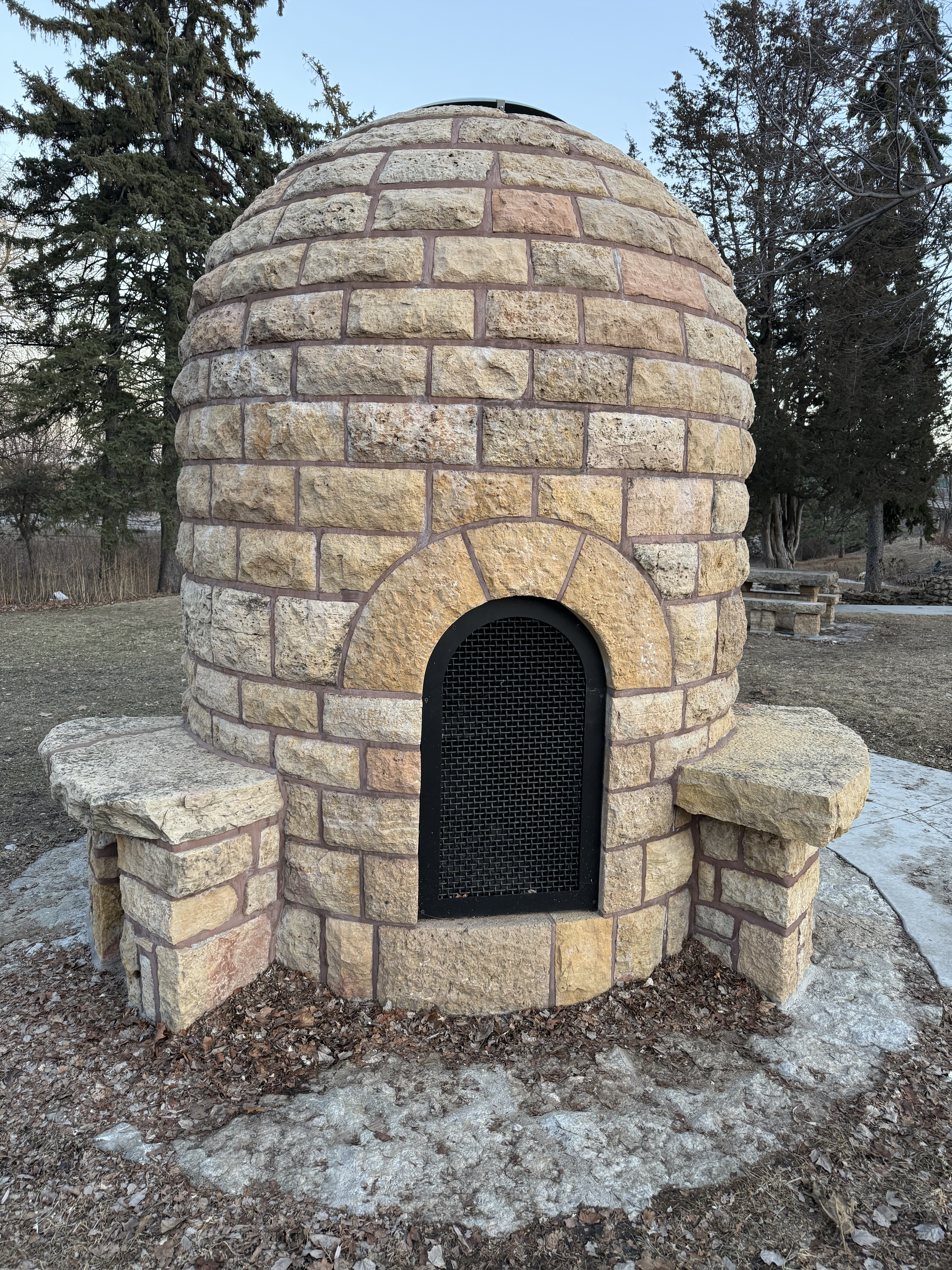
- A restored limestone "beehive" grill in Graeser Park.
- Location: NW corner of the junction of TH 100 and Bottineau Boulevard (CSAH 81), Robbinsdale, Minnesota
- Coordinates: 45.03671°N 93.34493°W
- Area: 4 acres (1.6 ha)
- Built: 1940-1941
- Architect: Arthur R. Nichols, Carl F. Graeser, Harold E. Olson
- Architectural style: National Park Service Rustic
- MPS: Federal Relief Construction in Minnesota, 1933-1943
- NRHP reference No.: 100012382

Graeser Park, also known as Graeser Roadside Parking Area, is a roadside park in Robbinsdale, Minnesota located at the junction of Minnesota State Highway 100 and Hennepin County Road 81. It was listed on the National Register of Historic Places in December, 2025 as an outstanding example of the National Park Service Rustic style.

== History ==
The Minnesota Department of Highways established the Roadside Development Division in 1932 with federal relief funds during the Great Depression. They were anticipating a requirement that a minimum of one-half of one percent of federal highway funds would be spent on roadside development. These federal relief programs offered employment to architects, landscape architects, engineers, and other professionals. Meanwhile, the Belt Line highway was planned in the late 1920s and was under construction in 1934–1935. It was envisioned as a safe, modern highway encircling the Twin Cities, as well as a way to divert traffic from needing to go through Minneapolis. It would feature two 24 feet (7.3 m) lanes separated by a 30 feet (9.1 m) median, along with grade separations at railroad crossings and major intersecting highways, cloverleaf interchanges, and limited access points. Seven roadside parks were planned to provide rest for drivers as well as gathering spots for local residents. These roadside parks were influenced by the National Park Service, which was developing design standards for its Rustic Style. Construction of Highway 100 reached U.S. Route 52 (now County Road 81) by 1940–41, but was later continued to ordnance plants in Fridley and New Brighton during World War II.

Arthur R. Nichols was the main landscape architect of the Belt Line and its roadside parks. He worked with chief highway department engineer Harold E. Olson, project engineer Carl F. Graeser, and staff landscape architect Fred Vogt. Graeser was known as the "Father of the Belt Line" for his promotion of the highway's concept and funding. The roadside parks were placed at strategic points where the right-of-way was wide enough to permit it. Motorists on Highway 100 may have found these parks difficult to access, though, because drivers may have been unprepared for quick deceleration or a sudden turn off of the highway. Graeser Park did not have direct access from Highway 100, but instead had direct access from West Broadway and from Highway 52.

== Reconstruction ==
By 1959, there was a need to upgrade Highway 100. Several of the roadside parks were eliminated by roadway expansion. Glenwood Roadside Parking Area in Golden Valley was eliminated in 1959, and the Excelsior Boulevard Roadside Park was removed in 1969. The St. Louis Park Roadside Parking Area was renamed to Lilac Park, and it was restored with the beehive fireplace with the original Lilac Park, which was at the corner of Minnetonka Boulevard and Highway 100. Blazer Park, located near Minnesota State Highway 55, was removed in 1997, and Graeser Park South, located in Robbinsdale just past the railroad tracks and West Broadway, was lost in 2001. A major construction project between 2001 and 2004 used Graeser Park for construction staging, and the stone picnic tables were removed and salvaged off-site. The Minnesota Department of Transportation rehabilitated Graeser Park's landscape and structures between 2021 and 2024.

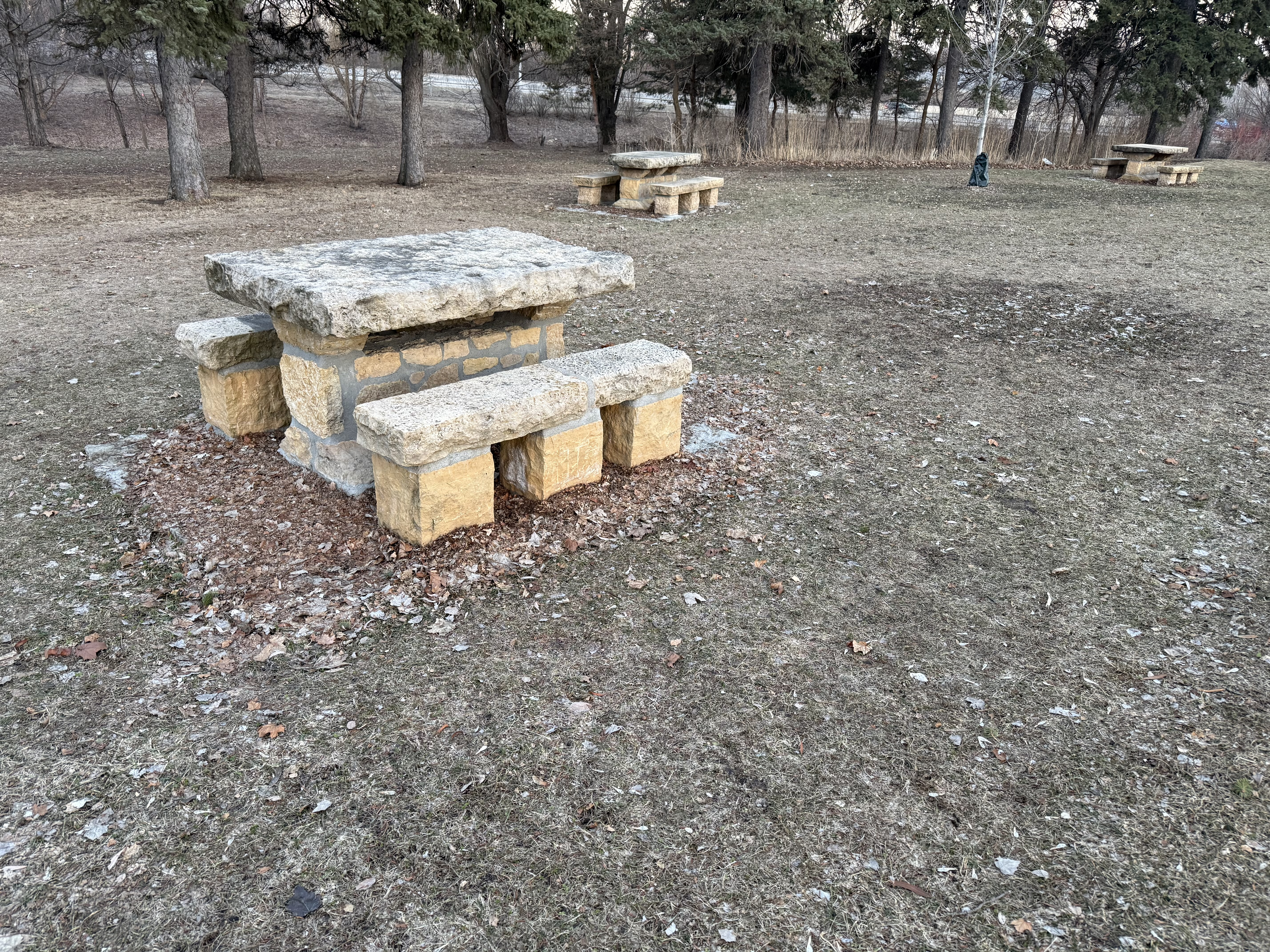
One of the restored picnic tables

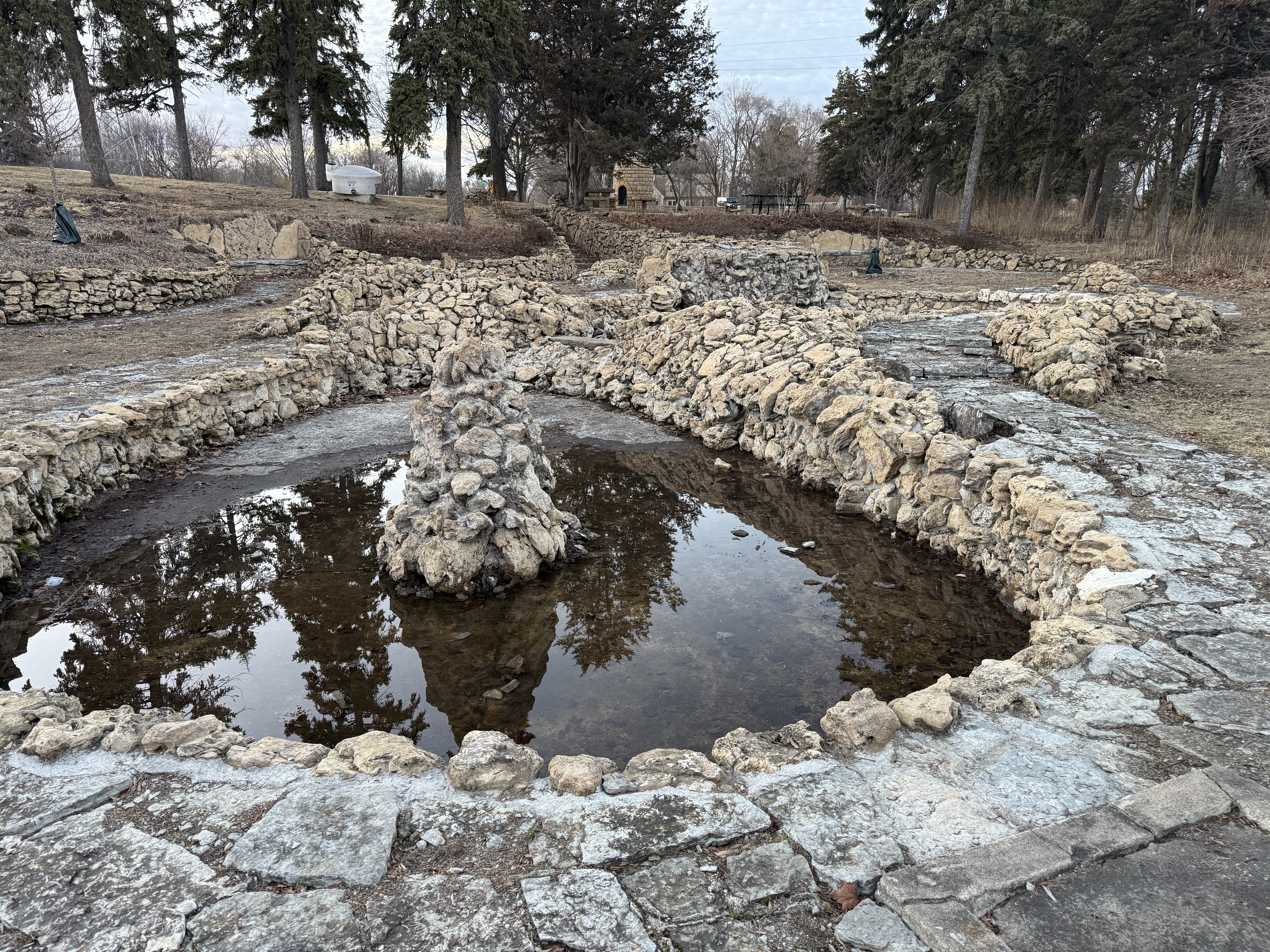
The rock garden

The park has fifteen structures that contribute to the National Register nomination. They include eleven limestone picnic tables, which were originally built with limestone obtained from the demolition of a Minneapolis flour mill. Another contributing structure is the limestone overlook wall along Lakeland Avenue North. There is also a rock garden in the southwestern quarter of the park. The rock garden had two pools that were originally supplied with a waterfall, but the water supply has since been disconnected. Finally, the focal point of the picnic area is a beehive-shaped limestone fireplace with three round openings for cooking. During 2021–22, MnDOT cleaned the masonry, restored the mortar joints, and installed wire covers to prevent actual use of the fireplace.
