= Amy Robbins Ware =

American author and Red Cross worker (1877–1929)

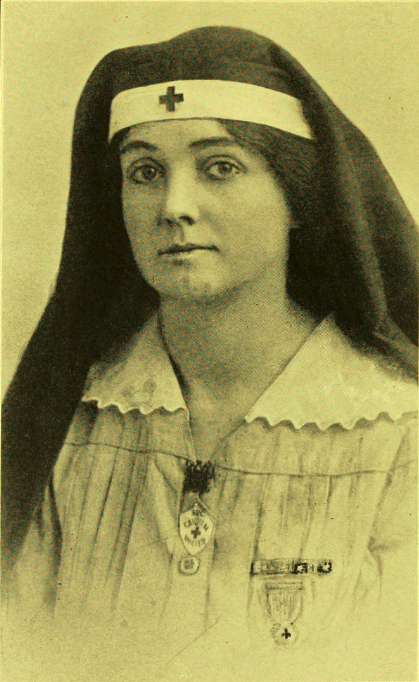
- Amy Robbins Ware, A.R.C., A.E.F., 1918
- Born: Amy Irene Robbins; September 7, 1877; Minneapolis, Minnesota, U.S.
- Died: May 5, 1929 (aged 51); Minneapolis
- Other name: Mrs. John Roland Ware
- Education: University of Minnesota
- Occupations: World War I veteran; author; peace activist; clubwoman
- Organizations: American Red Cross; American Expeditionary Forces
- Notable work: Echoes of France
- Father: Andrew Bonney Robbins
- Relatives: T. B. Walker; John Howland

Signature
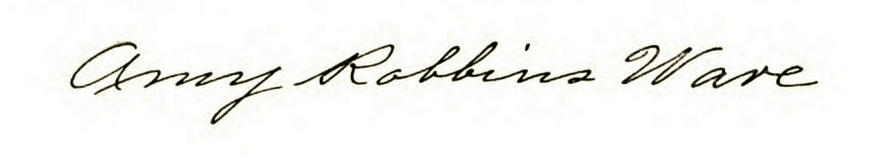

Amy Robbins Ware (September 7, 1877 – May 5, 1929) was an American author, world court worker, peace activist, and clubwoman. During World War I, she served in various capacities for the American Red Cross and the American Expeditionary Forces in France. As a member of the Red Cross, she saw duty in a canteen near the frontlines in the days of the last drive just before the armistice of 11 November 1918 was signed. She was also connected with the army college at Savenay. Ware wrote of her war experience, in prose and verse, in Echoes of France (1920). In 1925, as chair of the department of international cooperation for the Minnesota Federation of Women's Clubs, Ware set in motion the efforts of 50,000 clubwomen of the state to consider the question of international cooperation, her hope being that women may keep informed as to the rapidly changing conditions of the world and be ready to lend aid to further the kind of international cooperation that will bring about permanent world peace.

== Early life and education ==
Amy Irene Robbins was born in Minneapolis, Minnesota, September 7, 1877, at the home of her uncle, Thomas Barlow Walker. She was the daughter of Andrew Bonney Robbins, Civil War volunteer and Adelaide Julia Walker, Civil War nurse. Andrew Bonney Robbins is the namesake of Robbinsdale, Minnesota. Ware was a lineal descendant of the Mayflower Pilgrim, John Howland, through Captain Abraham Shaw (American Revolutionary War officer), Capt. Shaw's daughter being Mary (Shaw) Robbins, mother of Andrew Bonney Robbins. Amy's siblings were Harland A. Robbins, Edith Anstis Robbins, Helen M. Robbins, Adelaide B. Robbins, Ruth Marian Robbins, and Esther Marjory Robbins. Like Amy, all of the sisters were graduates of the University of Minnesota and were members of the Pi Beta Phi sorority and the Association of Collegiate Alumnae.

Much of the active interest in art which motivated Ware's life originated in the hours spent from early childhood among the artworks of the T. B. Walker Collection.

From the age of eight, Ware manifested a marked love for violin music, and at that time, she began studying under Carl Lachmund and Heinrich Hoevel; later, she became a violin teacher.

She graduated from East Minneapolis High School, 1896, specializing in architecture, which she practiced until 1898, including a year's apprenticeship at the Taggart Agricultural offices. In 1901, Ware received her B.S. degree from the University of Minnesota, studying botany, chemistry, and modern languages. She studied applied design, woodcarving, leather, and jewelry in summer schools held by the Minneapolis Handicraft Guild, 1905–06. She received her M.A. degree in 1907 from the University of Minnesota, majoring in dramaturgy, historic design, and archaeology.

== Career ==
=== World War I ===
Coming from a family who for generations served in the military of their country, it was inevitable that Ware should take part in the World War as soon as the U.S. became involved. On April 6, 1917 (the day the U.S. declared war), Ware entered the American School of Telegraphy, studying Morse and Radio telegraphy, remaining until September 1917, after which she continued a radio department under the Woman's Naval Service, Incorporated, training women whom Dunwoody Naval Training Station (Minneapolis) could not accommodate. She taught day and night classes from September 5, 1917, to March 1918.

Having been accepted as a canteen worker by the American Red Cross, Ware sailed for France on SS La Touraine, March 14, 1918. Her first assignment to 3d Air Instructional Center, Issoudun, enabled her to continue teaching radio, nights, to prospective "observers", while serving in Red Cross Canteen through the day. When the Red Cross called for volunteers to the front, September 1918, Ware went and served in emergency canteen and nursing throughout St. Mihiel and Argonne drives, "under fire" with Field Hospital No. 41, where there were no other women than her unit, at Sorcey-sur-Meuse. She had learned the maneuvers of the aviators at the Aviation Center, and in her book, Echoes of France, described the first air battle she saw, at Sorcey, under the title "Birds of the Night". She continued with Evacuation Hospital, No. 9, Vaubricourt; and No. 11, Brizeaux-Forestierre in the Argonne, until December 8, 1918.

In January 1919, gave up her canteen at Quai d'Orsay, Paris due to a lung infection and was sent to the French Riviera to recuperate. She was transferred from the Red Cross to the Army, April 15, 1919. For four months after her recovery, she was a member of the faculty of the University established for the American Expeditionary Forces and was stationed at Savenay Hospital Center, where she taught architecture, mechanical drawing, and lettering. Ware had been on overseas duty for sixteen months when she received her discharge from the army, in New York City, on June 14, 1919, when she returned to Robbinsdale.

=== Return to Minnesota ===
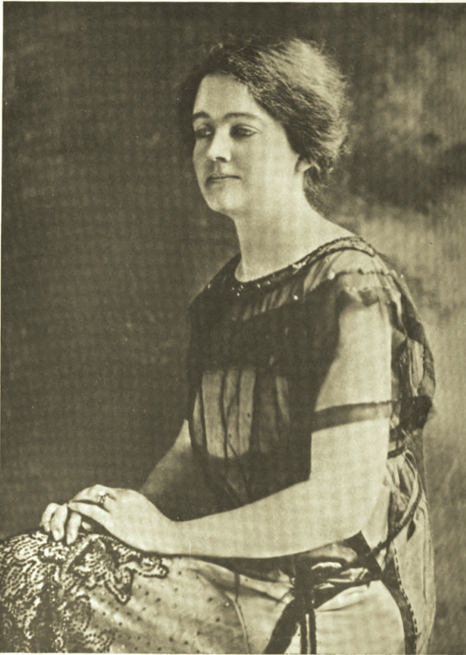
Amy Robbins Ware (1921)

On May 12, 1920, she again entered the Government service, teaching in the Army School at Fort Snelling, Minnesota, to July 1921. In connection with this position, she did notable work in the E. and R. Special Summer School at Camp Grant, Illinois, 1920, and 1921, was supervisor of education at Fort Snelling Minnesota. Even in times of peace, she followed in her father's footsteps in civic ways, as an active member of the Hennepin County Republican Speakers' Bureau, and other political organizations.

With her sister, Edith, Ware conducted the "Andrew B. Robbins Estate" and Robbinsdale Insurance and Loan Agency. In 1924, they were building and financing homes for children of their father's clients of the 1890s. They also owned the Robbinsdale Hy-Way Tea House.

Ware wrote a comprehensive treatise on "The Permanent Court of International Justice as the Logical First Step Toward Prevention of War". Her active support of the administration on this issue received an expression of personal appreciation from President Warren G. Harding. She also broadcast radio talks on this and other subjects, from the Minnesota League of Women voters.

Ware became the first woman of Minnesota to hold the office of state vice commander of the American Legion (1921). In recognition of her sympathetic understanding of the needs of their war orphans, the French Committee in Paris elected Ware to be the National American representative for the school for training these orphans to efficient self-support in "L'lnstitute Foch," which was the American branch of the Joffre Institute for Vocational Training. She served as national president of the Women's Overseas Service League. She was the tenth district chair, League of Women Voters. Within the Minnesota Federation of Woman's Clubs, Ware served as state chair, international relations, while in the General Federation of Women's Clubs, Ware served as chair, research division, international relations department and later as vice-chair, international relations department. In Minneapolis, Ware was the chair of the community club building committee, president of the Tourist Club (1923), member of the Business Woman's Club, and violinist in the community orchestra. Ware was a member of the Maine Society Descendants of the Mayflower; Old Trails Chapter, Daughters of the American Revolution, Minneapolis; National Greek Letter Sorority, Pi Beta Phi; College Women's Club, and Association of Collegiate Alumnae; Woman's Relief Corps; Le Marianda and Business Women's clubs of Minneapolis; and Westminster Presbyterian Church.

== Personal life ==
On August 14, 1907, in Robbinsdale, she married a Minnesota lawyer, John Roland Ware. They resided at "The Orchard" in Robbinsdale. "The Orchard" was a gift from her father and mother. The following year, Mrs. Ware established the Orchard Crafts Guild.

She spent the years 1913 and 1914 in Europe continent accompanied by her mother, continuing her studies along handicraft and architectural lines. The family party also Dr. and Mrs. Rodda, Mrs. R. P. Gillette and her son, Louis, and a cousin, Ann Walker.

Ware and her husband had no children. Eventually, they divorced, and he remarried in 1921.

After being ill for a week, Amy Robbins Ware died at Abbott Hospital in Minneapolis from a cerebral hemorrhage on May 5, 1929.

== Selected works ==
- Echoes of France (1920) (text)
- "The Permanent Court of International Justice as the Logical First Step Toward Prevention of War"

== See also ==
- American women in World War I
