= Everette Pedescleaux =

American football player (born 1985)

No. 93
- Position: Defensive end

Personal information
- Born: January 19, 1985 (age 41); Plymouth, Minnesota
- Listed height: 6 ft 6 in (1.98 m)
- Listed weight: 305 lb (138 kg)

Career information
- High school: Plymouth (MN) Armstrong
- College: Northern Iowa
- NFL draft: 2009: undrafted

Career history
- Denver Broncos (2009)*; Cleveland Gladiators (2011)*
- * Offseason or practice squad member only

Awards and highlights
- AP All-American Third-team (2008); All-MVFC First-team (2008)
- Stats at ArenaFan.com

Everette Pedescleaux (born January 19, 1985) is an American former football defensive end. He was signed by the Denver Broncos as an undrafted free agent in 2009. He played college football at Northern Iowa.

== College career ==
A native of Plymouth, Minnesota, Pedescleaux originally signed a football scholarship with the University of Minnesota with the intention to play basketball. However, he left the program before playing a game for the Gophers.

He attended the University of Northern Iowa, where he has played football in the defensive line for the Panthers. He started only 20 of 51 games for the Panthers. He started only eight of 15 in 2008. Pedescleaux had 54 tackles, 11.5 tackle-for-loss and 6.5 quarterback sacks and blocked six kick for the Panthers in 2008 and was named All-Missouri Valley Football Conference First-team.

== Professional career ==
Pedescleaux projected as a 3-4 defensive end in the NFL and was considered a "sleeper" for the 2009 NFL draft, but went undrafted. He was signed by the Denver Broncos and was placed on the practice squad/injured list on November 3, 2009. His practice squad contract with Denver expired in January 2010.
