= Andrew Bonney Robbins =

American entrepreneur, civil war veteran, real estate developer

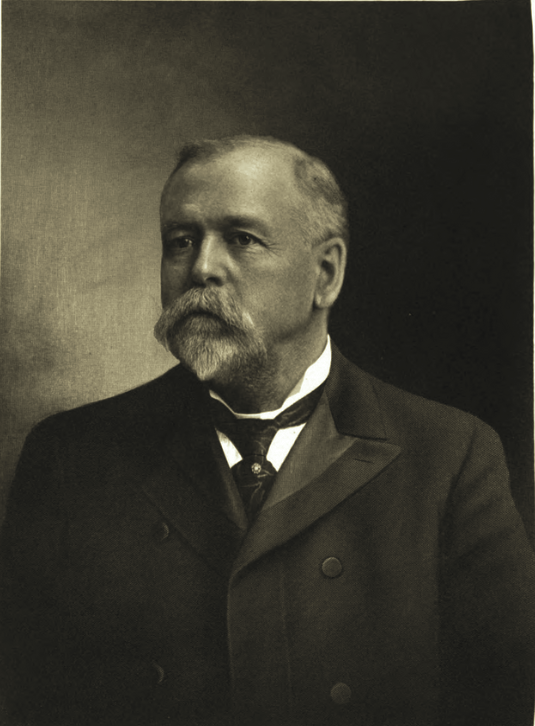
Andrew Bonney Robbins

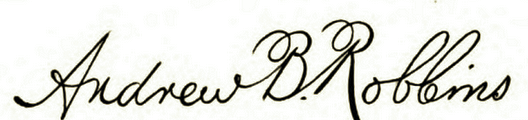
signature

Andrew Bonney Robbins (April 27, 1845 – June 16, 1910) was an American entrepreneur, civil war veteran, and real estate developer in the pioneer period of Minneapolis. The town of Robbinsdale, Minnesota is named in his honor. At the age of 30, he was elected to the state senate, being the youngest member of that body at the time.

== Early life and education ==
He was born in Phillips, Maine, April 27, 1845, his parents being Daniel and Mary (Shaw) Robbins, the latter a granddaughter of Captain Abraham Shaw, who was a soldier of the American Revolutionary War and a descendant of John Howland, one of the Pilgrims who came to the new world on the Mayflower. The father was a representative businessman of Phillips, Maine, possessing a considerable estate and making his home in New England until 1855, when he brought his family to what was then the far west, settling at Anoka, in the Minnesota Territory. As Andrew was eight years old at the time, he was partly reared amid the environment of pioneer life.

In Minnesota, he received his education in the common schools and in the academy.

== Career ==
He was seventeen when, in 1862, he joined the Union Army, enlisting in the Eighth Regiment of Minnesota Volunteers, with which he served until the close of the civil war. His company was on active duty in connection with the suppression of the Indian uprising under General Alfred Sully, going to the relief of Captain Fisk and later was sent south, where it was attached to General John Schofield, Twenty-third Army Corps, participating in the Second Battle of Murfreesboro, and also in the Battle of Franklin, Tennessee. Afterward, the command was joined to General William Tecumseh Sherman's forces, and thus, Robbins saw active duty on some of the most hotly contested battlefields of the south.

With his return home from the war, Robbins accepted the first employment he could find, which was night work in a sawmill. He went on to become chief accountant, ticket agent, and telegraph operator in St. Anthony, Minnesota with what became the Great Northern Railway Company, and following the extension of the line to Willmar, Minnesota, he took the first train to that place and became manager of the terminal. He also became associated with the upbuilding of that city. He began dealing there in lumber, farm machinery, and grain, developing a business of considerable proportions along all those lines and also founding the Bank of Willmar. He became a charter member of the First Presbyterian church at Willmar and at the age of 30, he was elected to the state senate, where he served two terms, being made chair of several committees, although the youngest member of the senate. During the Locust Plague of 1874, when the grasshopper brought depression, if not ruin, throughout the agricultural district of the county in which he lived and of adjoining counties, he framed and promoted the first seed grain law to relieve the situation and safeguard the farmers of that district. To combat the invasion of the pests which were so rapidly destroying crops, he devised the sheet iron "hopperdozer," which was very practical and is still in use. Robbins and his brother-in-law, T. B. Walker, drove through the countryside where not a green leaf remained, the insects having destroyed every vestige of growing plants. They distributed quantities of seed free to the farmers for replanting and were thus of great service to the district.

With the passing years, Robbins became interested at Willmar in the grain and elevator business, and continuing in this line he removed to Merriam Park, Minnesota, organizing the Northwestern Elevator Company of Minneapolis, successfully managing its business interests for 14 years, and also becoming a leading member of the Chamber of Commerce. He afterward founded the Minnesota & Dakota Elevator Company and became a prominent figure in grain trade circles in the state.

In 1890, he purchased large tracts of land north of Minneapolis and founded the town of Robbinsdale, where he planted thousands of trees. He was also one of the builders of the street railway to the town and he made many other extensive improvements, contributing to the growth and prosperity of the region.

Robbins continued his political and religious activities in the various regions in which he resided. While at Robbinsdale, he was elected to the state legislature and was particularly helpful in his attitude toward the University of Minnesota, securing generous support to the institution. He was afterward made state surveyor general of logs and lumber and he kept in close touch with many of the most vital problems of the state concerning the utilization and development of its natural resources. As the years passed on, he concentrated his efforts and attention largely on real estate building, for he had acquired extensive holdings. He was one of the trustees of Macalester College, remained an active worker in the Presbyterian church, and was instrumental in founding the church at Merriam Park. Fraternally, he was a thirty-second degree Mason and was also an active and valued member of the Grand Army of the Republic, serving as commander of his post. He was also elected to the directorate of the Minneapolis Business Men's Union.

== Personal life ==
In 1869, he married Adelaide Julia Walker, a sister of Thomas Barlow Walker. Her mother, Anstis Barlow Walker, was descended from a member of the New York foot troops in the American Revolutionary War. In 1862, she became a volunteer nurse in the Tupler General Hospital at Columbus, Ohio. All five daughters were graduates of the University of Minnesota and members of the Pi Beta Phi sorority and the Association of Collegiate Alumnae. Their children were:

- Harland A., b. in Minneapolis, Minn., Jan. 12, 1870; d. Feb. 2, 1876.
- Edith A., b. in Willmar, Minn., July 20, 1871.
- Helen M., b. in Willmar, March 23, 1873; d. Aug. 21, 1876.
- Amy I., b. in Minneapolis, Sept. 7, 1877.
- Adalaide B., b. in Willmar, April 1, 1881.
- Ruth M., b. in Mirriam Park, Minn., Aug. 31, 1886.
- Esther M., b. in Mirriam Park, June 26, 1889.

Andrew Bonney Robbins died at his home in Robbinsdale, June 16, 1910, when he was 65 years of age. He was buried in Lakewood Cemetery.
