= Travis Richards =

American ice hockey player (born 1970)

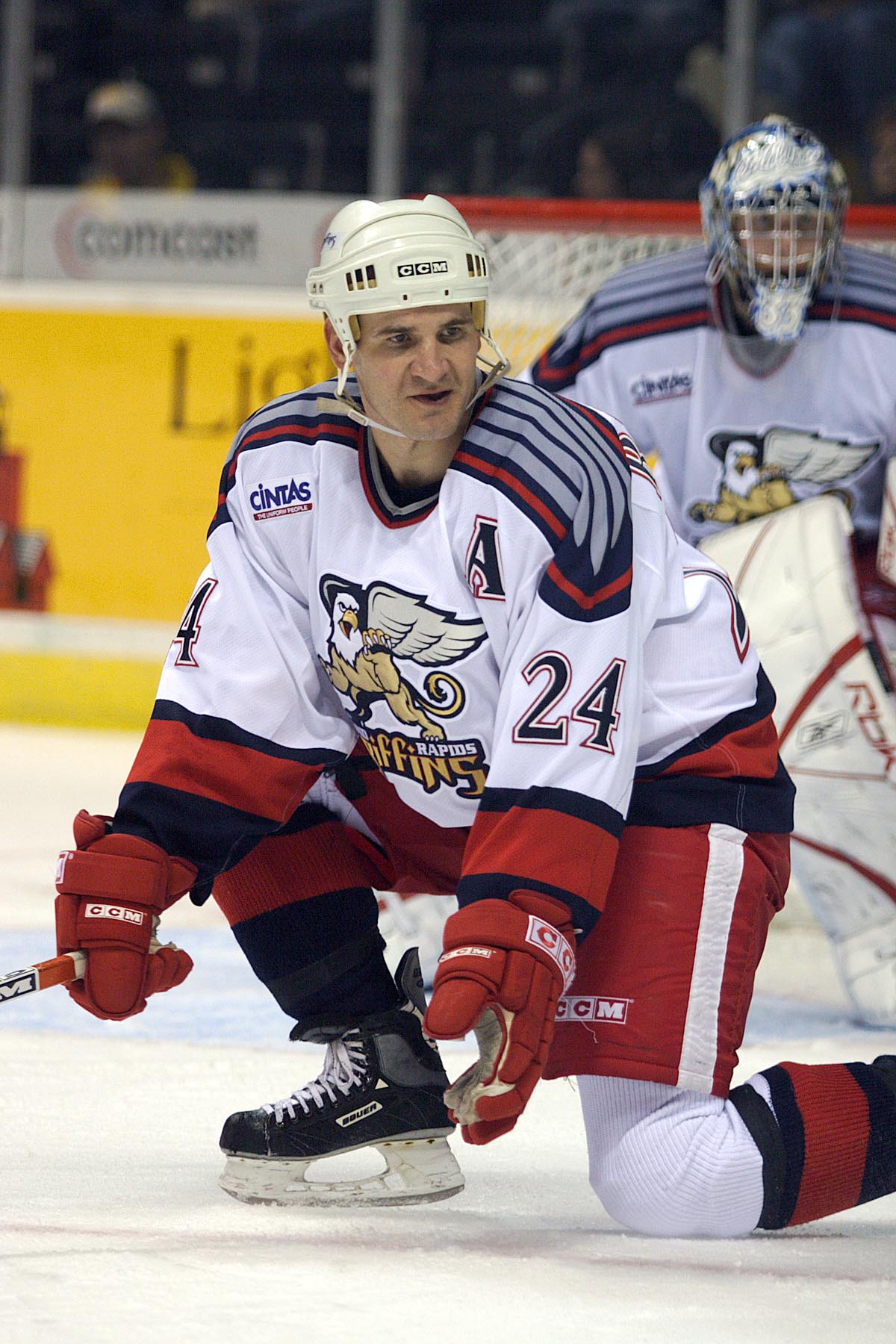
- Richards with the Grand Rapids Griffins in 2005
- Born: March 22, 1970 (age 56) Crystal, Minnesota, U.S.
- Height: 6 ft 1 in (185 cm)
- Weight: 195 lb (88 kg; 13 st 13 lb)
- Position: Defense
- Shot: Left
- Played for: Dallas Stars
- National team: United States
- NHL draft: 169th overall, 1988; Minnesota North Stars
- Playing career: 1993–2006

Travis John Richards (born March 22, 1970) is an American former professional ice hockey defenseman. He played briefly in the National Hockey League (NHL) with the Dallas Stars.

Richards played ten seasons for the minor-league Grand Rapids Griffins. He is the first player with his jersey retired by the club, and was the only until Michel Picard's uniform was retired on February 19, 2022.

== Playing career ==
Richards graduated from Robbinsdale Armstrong High School in Plymouth, Minnesota in 1988. Richards was a member of the University of Minnesota Gophers hockey program before making his professional debut during the 1993-94 season. A child psychology major, Richards would spend four years at the University of Minnesota where his brother Todd was a Gopher from 1985 to 1989. Earning WCHA Second Team All-Star honors on defense in 1992 and in 1993, Richards would join the US National Team at the 1993 World Championships at the end of his senior year.

Drafted by the Minnesota North Stars of the National Hockey League in the ninth round (169th overall) of the 1988 NHL entry draft, Richards played only three games in the NHL for the Dallas Stars. On July 26, 1996, Richards became the second player ever to sign with the Grand Rapids Griffins, then of the International Hockey League, now of the American Hockey League. Richards played in each of the team's first ten seasons and became team captain in 2001. He holds the record for most career games as a Griffin with 655. Richards's number 24 was retired by the Griffins upon his retirement, becoming the first number retired by the club.

== Personal ==
For a time, Richards was the hockey director at The Edge Ice Arena in Holland, Michigan. He resides in Grand Rapids, Michigan and has three children. Richard’s is co-owner of Southside Ice Arena in Byron Center. Travis is hockey director for all Tier 1 hockey at Fox Motors Hockey Club also plays out of Southside Ice Arena.

== Career statistics ==
=== Regular season and playoffs ===
			Regular season					Playoffs
Season	Team	League	GP	G	A	Pts	PIM	GP	G	A	Pts	PIM
1986–87	Robbinsdale Armstrong High School	HS-MN	22	6	16	22	20	—	—	—	—	—
1987–88	Robbinsdale Armstrong High School	HS-MN	24	14	14	28		—	—	—	—	—
1989–90	University of Minnesota	WCHA	45	4	24	28	38	—	—	—	—	—
1990–91	University of Minnesota	WCHA	45	9	25	34	28	—	—	—	—	—
1991–92	University of Minnesota	WCHA	44	10	23	33	65	—	—	—	—	—
1992–93	University of Minnesota	WCHA	42	12	26	38	54	—	—	—	—	—
1993–94	United States	Intl	51	1	11	12	38	—	—	—	—	—
1993–94	Kalamazoo Wings	IHL	19	2	10	12	20	4	1	1	2	0
1994–95	Kalamazoo Wings	IHL	63	4	16	20	53	15	1	5	6	12
1994–95	Dallas Stars	NHL	2	0	0	0	0	—	—	—	—	—
1995–96	Michigan K-Wings	IHL	65	8	15	23	55	9	2	2	4	4
1995–96	Dallas Stars	NHL	1	0	0	0	2	—	—	—	—	—
1996–97	Grand Rapids Griffins	IHL	77	10	13	23	83	5	1	3	4	2
1997–98	Grand Rapids Griffins	IHL	81	12	20	32	70	3	1	1	2	4
1998–99	Grand Rapids Griffins	IHL	82	9	23	32	84	—	—	—	—	—
1999–2000	Grand Rapids Griffins	IHL	71	5	23	28	47	17	1	7	8	16
2000–01	Grand Rapids Griffins	IHL	75	5	30	35	42	10	0	5	5	8
2001–02	Grand Rapids Griffins	AHL	72	6	23	29	36	5	0	1	1	2
2002–03	Grand Rapids Griffins	AHL	73	6	21	27	52	15	0	4	4	6
2003–04	Grand Rapids Griffins	AHL	76	2	22	24	48	4	1	0	1	2
2004–05	Grand Rapids Griffins	AHL	35	1	3	4	30	—	—	—	—	—
2005–06	Grand Rapids Griffins	AHL	13	0	4	4	10	—	—	—	—	—
IHL totals			533	55	150	205	454	63	7	24	31	48
NHL totals			3	0	0	0	2	—	—	—	—	—
AHL totals			269	15	73	88	176	24	1	5	6	10

=== International ===
Year	Team	Event	Result	GP	G	A	Pts	PIM
1993	United States	WC	6th	5	0	1	1	0
1994	United States	OG	8th	8	0	0	0	2
Senior totals				13	0	1	1	2

== Awards and honors ==
Award	Year
College
All-WCHA Second Team	1991–92
All-WCHA Second Team	1992–93
AHL
All-Star Game	2004

Awards and achievements
Preceded by Corwin Saurdiff	WCHA Most Valuable Player in Tournament; 1993	Succeeded by Chris McAlpine
