= Crystal, Minnesota =

City in Minnesota, United States

- City
- Flag

- Location of the city of Crystal within Hennepin County, Minnesota
- Coordinates: 45°2′14″N 93°21′34″W
- Country: United States
- State: Minnesota
- County: Hennepin
- Founded: 1866
- Incorporated: January 11, 1887

Government
  - Mayor: Julie Deshler

Area
  - Total: 5.87 sq mi (15.21 km^{2})
  - Land: 5.79 sq mi (14.99 km^{2})
  - Water: 0.085 sq mi (0.22 km^{2})
- Elevation: 892 ft (272 m)

Population (2020)
  - Total: 23,330
  - Estimate (2022): 22,265
  - Density: 4,031.7/sq mi (1,556.63/km^{2})
- Time zone: UTC-6 (Central (CST))
  - Summer (DST): UTC-5 (CDT)
- ZIP codes: 55422, 55427, 55428, 55429
- Area code: 763
- FIPS code: 27-14158
- GNIS feature ID: 0642518
- Website: crystalmn.gov

Crystal is a suburban city in Hennepin County, Minnesota, about 5 miles (8.0 km) from downtown Minneapolis. The population was 23,330 at the 2020 census. Minnesota State Highway 100 and County Road 81 are two of Crystal's main routes.

== Geography ==
According to the United States Census Bureau, the city has an area of 5.88 square miles (15.23 km^{2}), of which 5.78 square miles (14.97 km^{2}) is land and 0.10 square miles (0.26 km^{2}) is water.

City routes include Douglas Drive North, 36th Avenue North, 42nd Avenue North, and Bass Lake Road.

Crystal Airport, a small general aviation field, is within the city limits.

The city is bordered on the north by Brooklyn Park, on the northeast by Brooklyn Center, on the east by Robbinsdale, on the south by Golden Valley, and on the west by New Hope.

Crystal has over 240 acres of parks and open spaces. It oversees 26 parks, with amenities such as ball fields, courts, playgrounds, trails, and activity areas. The Crystal Community Center has an outdoor aquatic center, a skate park, and a Little League Baseball complex.

Crystal has been awarded the "Minnesota Star City" designation for economic development.

== Demographics ==
Historical population
Census	Pop.	Note	%±
1860	417		—
1870	718		72.2%
1880	1,019		41.9%
1890	48		−95.3%
1900	750		1,462.5%
1910	966		28.8%
1920	814		−15.7%
1930	1,865		129.1%
1940	2,373		27.2%
1950	5,713		140.8%
1960	24,283		325.0%
1970	30,925		27.4%
1980	25,543		−17.4%
1990	23,788		−6.9%
2000	22,698		−4.6%
2010	22,151		−2.4%
2020	23,330		5.3%
2024 (est.)	22,082		−5.3%
U.S. Decennial Census; 2020 Census

=== 2020 census ===
As of the 2020 census, Crystal had a population of 23,330. The median age was 37.7 years. 21.2% of residents were under the age of 18 and 15.0% of residents were 65 years of age or older. For every 100 females there were 100.0 males, and for every 100 females age 18 and over there were 97.5 males age 18 and over.

100.0% of residents lived in urban areas, while 0.0% lived in rural areas.

There were 9,552 households in Crystal, of which 27.1% had children under the age of 18 living in them. Of all households, 41.6% were married-couple households, 21.0% were households with a male householder and no spouse or partner present, and 28.2% were households with a female householder and no spouse or partner present. About 30.9% of all households were made up of individuals and 11.6% had someone living alone who was 65 years of age or older.

There were 9,804 housing units, of which 2.6% were vacant. The homeowner vacancy rate was 0.6% and the rental vacancy rate was 4.1%.

Racial composition as of the 2020 census
Race	Number	Percent
White	15,744	67.5%
Black or African American	3,254	13.9%
American Indian and Alaska Native	165	0.7%
Asian	1,038	4.4%
Native Hawaiian and Other Pacific Islander	7	0.0%
Some other race	1,104	4.7%
Two or more races	2,018	8.6%
Hispanic or Latino (of any race)	2,023	8.7%

=== 2010 census ===
As of the census of 2010, there were 22,151 people, 9,183 households, and 5,640 families living in the city. The population density was 3,832.4 inhabitants per square mile (1,479.7/km^{2}). There were 9,634 housing units at an average density of 1,666.8 per square mile (643.6/km^{2}). The racial makeup of the city was 78.1% White, 10.5% African American, 0.7% Native American, 3.9% Asian, 3.0% from other races, and 3.8% from two or more races. Hispanic or Latino of any race were 6.5% of the population.

There were 9,183 households, of which 28.5% had children under the age of 18 living with them, 43.8% were married couples living together, 12.7% had a female householder with no husband present, 5.0% had a male householder with no wife present, and 38.6% were non-families. 30.3% of all households were made up of individuals, and 10.3% had someone living alone who was 65 years of age or older. The average household size was 2.39 and the average family size was 2.97.

The median age in the city was 38.1 years. 21.6% of residents were under the age of 18; 7.8% were between the ages of 18 and 24; 30.7% were from 25 to 44; 26.5% were from 45 to 64; and 13.7% were 65 years of age or older. The gender makeup of the city was 49.2% male and 50.8% female.

=== 2000 census ===
As of the census of 2000, there were 22,698 people, 9,389 households, and 6,102 families living in the city. The population density was 3,929.3 inhabitants per square mile (1,517.1/km^{2}). There were 9,481 housing units at an average density of 1,641.3 per square mile (633.7/km^{2}). The racial makeup of the city was 88.34% White, 4.20% African American, 0.59% Native American, 3.44% Asian, 0.02% Pacific Islander, 1.03% from other races, and 2.39% from two or more races. Hispanic or Latino of any race were 2.51% of the population.

There were 9,389 households, out of which 28.3% had children under the age of 18 living with them, 49.9% were married couples living together, 11.1% had a female householder with no husband present, and 35.0% were non-families. 27.5% of all households were made up of individuals, and 8.9% had someone living alone who was 65 years of age or older. The average household size was 2.39 and the average family size was 2.92.

In the city, the population was spread out, with 22.4% under the age of 18, 7.2% from 18 to 24, 34.6% from 25 to 44, 21.6% from 45 to 64, and 14.1% who were 65 years of age or older. The median age was 37 years. For every 100 females, there were 97.3 males. For every 100 females age 18 and over, there were 93.8 males.

The median income for a household in the city was $48,736, and the median income for a family was $54,738. Males had a median income of $39,494 versus $29,673 for females. The per capita income for the city was $23,163. About 2.5% of families and 4.4% of the population were below the poverty line, including 5.7% of those under age 18 and 3.6% of those age 65 or over.

== Government ==
The City of Crystal has a council–manager form of government. Under this plan, the elected members of the council set the policies for the operation of the city. The council hires a city manager, who is responsible for the administration of all city business. The city council members are elected on a nonpartisan basis.

The city council consists of seven members, which include a mayor and six council members. The mayor is Julie Deshler. Council members are John Budziszewski, David Cummings, Forest Eidbo, Traci Kamish, Therese Kiser, and Taji Onesirosan.

Crystal is in Minnesota's 5th congressional district, represented by Ilhan Omar, a Democrat.

Presidential election results 1960–2020

Precinct General Election Results
Year	Republican	Democratic	Third parties
2020	31.9% 4,274	65.1% 8,730	3.0% 408
2016	32.7% 3,996	56.8% 6,945	10.5% 1,279
2012	37.0% 4,739	60.0% 7,682	3.0% 374
2008	39.1% 5,006	58.4% 7,478	2.5% 322
2004	41.9% 5,456	56.7% 7,384	1.4% 194
2000	38.3% 4,059	54.4% 5,762	7.3% 767
1996	30.4% 3,480	58.1% 6,665	11.5% 1,323
1992	39.4% 3,972	47.4% 6,390	23.2% 3,136
1988	43.3% 5,620	56.7% 7,373	0.0% 0
1984	48.0% 6,295	52.0% 6,824	0.0% 0
1980	36.5% 4,738	53.0% 6,894	10.5% 1,369
1976	40.2% 5,427	58.1% 7,831	1.7% 230
1972	51.7% 6,635	46.2% 5,932	2.1% 267
1968	35.7% 4,192	59.9% 7,033	4.4% 510
1964	33.5% 3,655	66.2% 7,213	0.3% 32
1960	45.0% 4,345	54.8% 5,289	0.2% 23

== Education ==
Crystal is in the Robbinsdale School District.

== Notable people ==
- Tom Dooher – former president of Education Minnesota, born in Crystal
- Todd Richards – former head coach of the Columbus Blue Jackets of the National Hockey League
- Travis Richards – former NHL player
- Jeff Schuh – former NFL player, born in Crystal.
