= Minnesota State Highway 152 =

State highway in Minnesota, United States

Trunk Highway 152
- Former MN 152 highlighted in red

Route information
- Maintained by MnDOT
- Existed: April 22, 1933–1988

Major junctions
- South end: US 52 at Minneapolis
- North end: US 10 at Sauk Rapids

Location
- Country: United States
- State: Minnesota
- Counties: Hennepin, Wright, Stearns, Benton

Highway system
- Minnesota Trunk Highway System; Interstate; US; State; Legislative; Scenic
← MN 149	→ MN 156

Minnesota State Highway 152 was a highway in Minnesota, connecting the cities of St. Cloud and Minneapolis. It ran parallel to U.S. Route 52 and its route number derives from this. It originally began at U.S. 52 in St. Cloud and ran to U.S. 52 in Minneapolis, at the intersection of Washington Avenue and Broadway Street.

== Route description ==
Highway 152 served as an alternate of U.S. 52, running northwest–southeast from St. Cloud to Minneapolis.

Legally, the route was defined as routes 129 and 239 in the Minnesota Statutes § 161.115(60) and § 161.115(170). It was not marked with these numbers.

== History ==
Highway 152 was authorized in 1933, with a segment running through downtown St. Cloud to Sauk Rapids authorized in 1949.

Most of the highway was replaced by Interstate 94 in the late 1970s, moving the highway's north terminus to Highway 101 in Dayton. The section from I-94 into St. Cloud became CSAH 75.

In 1980, the road was turned back south of Highway 100. It was rolled back further in 1984, with the Brooklyn Boulevard section becoming CSAH 152. The remainder was turned back in the 1988 highway swap with Hennepin County, becoming CSAH 81.

== Major intersections ==
County	Location	mi	km	Destinations	Notes
Hennepin	Minneapolis	0.0	0.0	US 52	
Hennepin	Minneapolis	1.0	1.6	MN 278 (Lowry Avenue)	
Hennepin	Minneapolis	2.4	3.9	US 169 (Lyndale Avenue)	
Hennepin	Brooklyn Center	4.7	7.6	MN 100	
Hennepin	Brooklyn Park	9.6	15.4	US 52	South end of US 52 overlap
Hennepin	Osseo			US 52	North end of US 52 overlap
Hennepin	Hassan Township			MN 101	East end of MN 101 overlap
Hennepin	Rogers			MN 101	West end of MN 101 overlap
Wright	Monticello			MN 25	
Wright	Clearwater			MN 24	
Stearns	St. Cloud			MN 15	
Stearns	St. Cloud			US 52 / MN 23 (Division Street)	West end of US 52 / MN 23 overlap
Stearns	St. Cloud			US 52 / MN 23 (Division Street)	East end of US 52 / MN 23 overlap
Mississippi River				Sauk Rapids Bridge	
Benton	Sauk Rapids			US 10 (Broadway Avenue)	
1.000 mi = 1.609 km; 1.000 km = 0.621 mi: Concurrency terminus
