= Derek Peltier =

American ice hockey player (born 1985)

- Born: March 14, 1985 (age 41) Plymouth, Minnesota, U.S.
- Height: 5 ft 11 in (180 cm)
- Weight: 190 lb (86 kg; 13 st 8 lb)
- Position: Defence
- Shot: Left
- Played for: Colorado Avalanche; Iserlohn Roosters
- NHL draft: 184th overall, 2004; Colorado Avalanche
- Playing career: 2008–2013

Derek James Peltier (born March 14, 1985), is an American former professional ice hockey Defenseman. He most notably played in the National Hockey League with the Colorado Avalanche before finishing his professional career with German club Iserlohn Roosters of the Deutsche Eishockey Liga (DEL).

== Playing career ==
=== Amateur ===
Peltier originally played prep hockey with Robbinsdale Armstrong High School in the Minnesota State High School League and was named in the All-Classic Lake and an All-State Honourable mention by the St. Paul Pioneer Press in 2001–02 before joining the Cedar Rapids RoughRiders of the United States Hockey League.

In his second season with the RoughRiders, Peltier led Cedar defenseman in scoring with 33 points in 55 contests to be named in the All-USHL First Team. Derek's development as a dependable two-way defenseman resulted in being selected 184th overall by the Colorado Avalanche in the 2004 NHL entry draft. Committing to a collegiate career, Peltier joined the University of Minnesota in the WCHA. As a freshman in 2004–05, he was a U of M scholar athlete and led the entire team in Plus/minus (+17). In his sophomore season, Peltier continued his studies progression to be named in the 2005–06 WCHA All-Academic Team and All-Tournament team and appearing all 41 games for the Gophers.

As a Junior, Pelter was named to the WCHA All-Academic Team for the second consecutive season. He partnered 2006 first overall NHL draft pick Erik Johnson for the year and posted 15 points in 44 games. In his senior year Peltier was elected as captain of the Gophers for the 2007–08 season. He concluded his tenure with the Gopher's, playing in all 45 games, marking a streak of 172 consecutive games, missing only one game in his entire collegiate career. Posting a career high and team defense best 21 points, Peltier then signed an amateur tryout with Colorado's AHL affiliate, the Lake Erie Monsters, for the end of the 2007–08 season.

=== Professional ===
On June 5, 2008, Peltier was signed by the Avalanche to a three-year entry-level contract. Derek spent the majority of the 2008–09 season with the Monsters, before he received his first NHL call-up on March 17, 2009. Peltier made his NHL debut with the Avalanche on the same day in a 3-2 loss to the Minnesota Wild. Peltier remained with the cellar dwelling injury hit Avalanche for the remainder of the season, going scoreless in 11 games.

In the 2009–10 season, Peltier was again used as a reserve defenseman for the Avalanche, spending the most part of the season in the AHL. Limited to 44 games with Lake Erie through injury, Derek made his season debut for Colorado on January 8, 2010, against the Carolina Hurricanes. He played in 3 games with the Avalanche before returning with the Monsters to post 1 goal and 12 assists.

Without a contract offer from the Avalanche, Peltier was invited as a free agent on a try out to the Pittsburgh Penguins training camp for the 2010–11 season. He was later reassigned to AHL affiliate, Wilkes-Barre/Scranton Penguins, training camp in hopes for a contract but was released from the team on October 3, 2010. On October 7, Peltier moved to fellow AHL team, the Peoria Rivermen, signing a professional try out contract to start the season.

Following a season spent with Rivermen, Peltier left to sign a one-year contract for European team, the Iserlohn Roosters, of the German DEL on June 30, 2011. Peltier became a fixture on the Roosters blueline, recording 10 points 43 games, to be rewarded with a one-year contract extension. In the following 2012–13 season, Peltier regressed to post only 5 assists in 43 games with the cellar dwelling Roosters, he was not offered a new contract at the conclusion of the DEL season.

== Career statistics ==
			Regular season					Playoffs
Season	Team	League	GP	G	A	Pts	PIM	GP	G	A	Pts	PIM
2001–02	Robbinsdale Armstrong High School	HSMN
2002–03	Cedar Rapids RoughRiders	USHL	56	4	20	24	45	7	0	2	2	4
2003–04	Cedar Rapids RoughRiders	USHL	55	7	26	33	34	4	0	0	0	4
2004–05	University of Minnesota	WCHA	42	6	13	19	22	—	—	—	—	—
2005–06	University of Minnesota	WCHA	41	1	17	18	30	—	—	—	—	—
2006–07	University of Minnesota	WCHA	44	4	11	15	28	—	—	—	—	—
2007–08	University of Minnesota	WCHA	45	4	17	21	38	—	—	—	—	—
2007–08	Lake Erie Monsters	AHL	6	0	1	1	4	—	—	—	—	—
2008–09	Lake Erie Monsters	AHL	63	2	17	19	32	—	—	—	—	—
2008–09	Colorado Avalanche	NHL	11	0	0	0	2	—	—	—	—	—
2009–10	Lake Erie Monsters	AHL	44	1	12	13	26	—	—	—	—	—
2009–10	Colorado Avalanche	NHL	3	0	0	0	0	—	—	—	—	—
2010–11	Peoria Rivermen	AHL	61	3	10	13	28	4	0	1	1	0
2011–12	Iserlohn Roosters	DEL	43	3	7	10	12	2	0	0	0	2
2012–13	Iserlohn Roosters	DEL	43	0	5	5	35	—	—	—	—	—
AHL totals			174	6	40	46	90	4	0	1	1	0
NHL totals			14	0	0	0	2	—	—	—	—	—

== Awards and honours ==
Award	Year
College
WCHA All-Academic Team	2006, 2007
