= Century High School (Rochester, Minnesota) =

- Aerial photograph of Century High School

Location
- 2525 Viola Road Northeast; Rochester, Minnesota 55906; United States; 44.050018°N 92.425034°W

Information
- Type: Public high school
- Established: 1997; 29 years ago
- School district: Independent School District #535 (Rochester Public Schools)
- Principal: Patrick Breen
- Grades: 9–12
- Gender: Coed
- Enrollment: 1,608 (2024–2025)
- Colors: Navy Blue; Silver
- Nickname: Panthers
- Yearbook: Cerridwen
- Website: chs.rochesterschools.org

Century High School is a public high school located in Rochester, Minnesota, United States. It is part of Rochester Public Schools (Independent School District 535) and serves more than 1,600 students. More than 80 languages and dialects are spoken by students in Rochester Public Schools. Century High School is one of three public high schools in Rochester. The school mascot is the Panther, and school colors are navy blue and silver.

== History ==
The property on which the school was built was purchased from the Cassidy family in 1996. The family had owned the land for 105 years. The school's name was selected after a contentious process that began with a citizen's committee of 80 people who started with 204 names. After a five-hour meeting they settled on two possible names, Eleanor Roosevelt and Century. Century referred to the Cassidy farm which had been in the same family for over 100 years. Eleanor Roosevelt is a former first lady who was in the news in 1996 after remarks by Hillary Clinton. The two names were forwarded to the School Board for the final decision. At the time, Rochester remained a relatively conservative community, and the proposed name Eleanor Roosevelt faced opposition from some residents. An informal poll by the local newspaper showed a 2 to 1 preference for Century. After a forty-minute debate by the School Board, the members voted 4 to 3 for Century, citing a poll by elementary and junior-high students that showed a clear preference for that name. The students also selected the school's mascot, colors, and fight song. The construction of the school was supported by a voter-approved bond of $37.3 million.

The school was completed and opened in 1997 as a school for 9th and 10th grade students. 11th and 12th grade students were included in subsequent years. Students ate in the forum until 1998 when construction of the school cafeteria was completed. The cafeteria was later expanded in order to meet the growing student population's needs.

== Sports ==
Century High School offers interscholastic athletic programs throughout the school year. Fall sports include football, boys' and girls' soccer, cross country, volleyball, tennis, swimming and diving, cheerleading, performance dance, and adapted soccer. Winter sports include ice hockey, basketball, competitive dance, gymnastics, alpine skiing, wrestling, swimming and diving, and adapted floor hockey. Spring sports include track and field, softball, baseball, golf, tennis, volleyball, lacrosse, and adapted softball.

In 2026, Century's boys' wrestling team won its first Big Nine Conference championship in program history. The girls' swimming and diving team also won its seventh consecutive Big Nine Conference championship that year. The school's cooperative adapted softball team finished as the state runner-up in 2025. In cross country, the boys' team, led by longtime dominant head coach Paul Callahan, won the Rochester All-City championship in 2026. The girls' cross country team also won its respective Rochester All-City championship that year. Century girls' soccer team won its second consecutive Big Nine Conference championship in 2026, while the boys' soccer team advanced to the Section 1AAA championship game.
