= Evan Kaufmann =

German-American ice hockey player

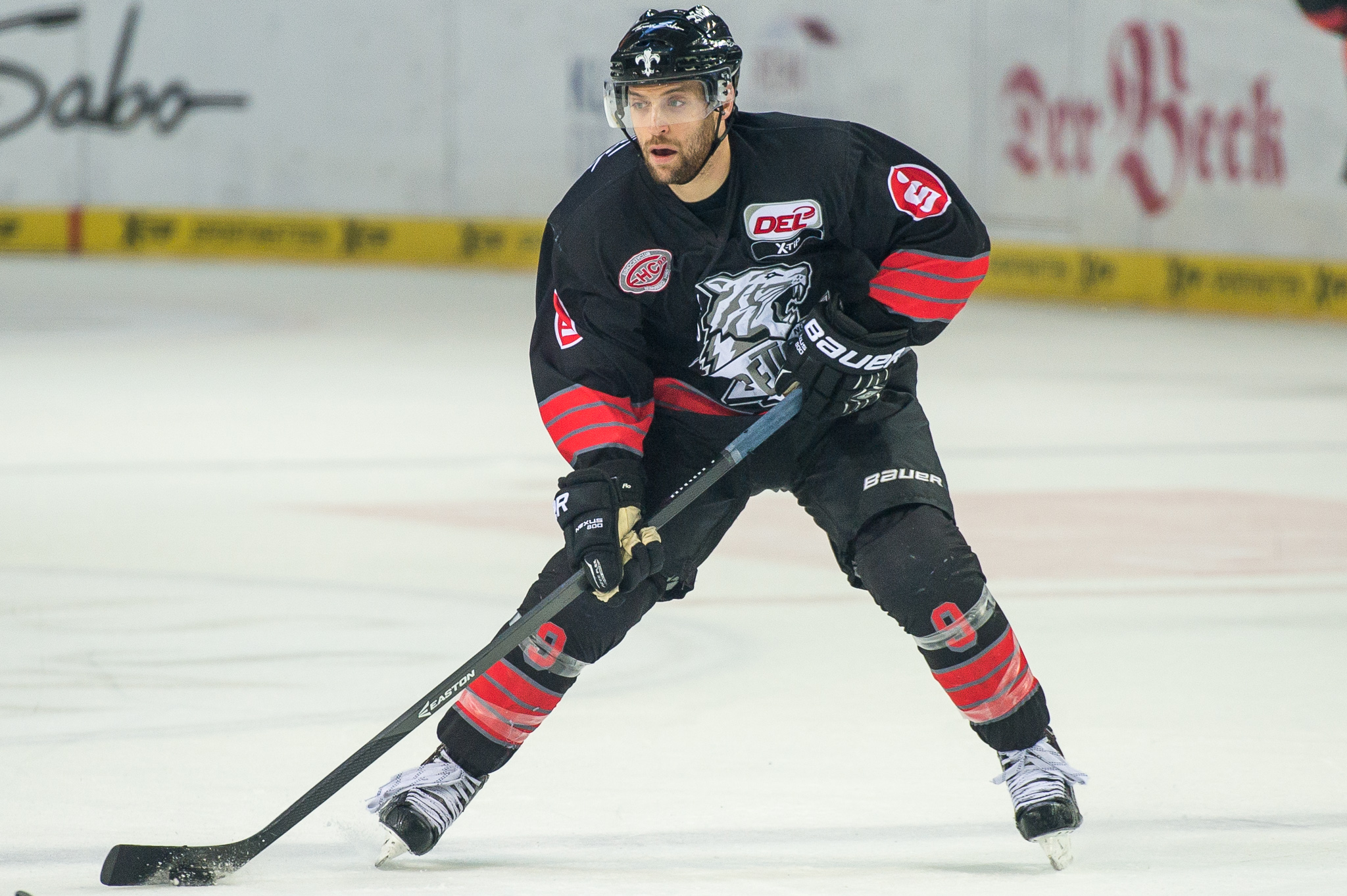
- Born: October 31, 1984 (age 40); Plymouth, Minnesota, U.S.
- Height: 5 ft 9 in (175 cm)
- Weight: 167 lb (76 kg; 11 st 13 lb)
- Position: Forward
- Shot: Right
- Played for: DEG Metro Stars; Thomas Sabo Ice Tigers
- National team: Germany
- NHL draft: Undrafted
- Playing career: 2008–2015

Evan Kaufmann (born October 31, 1984) is a German-American former professional ice hockey forward who played in the Deutsche Eishockey Liga (DEL).

== Playing career ==
Kaufmann, who is Jewish, was born in Plymouth, Minnesota and graduated from Robbinsdale Armstrong High School at Plymouth in 2003. His great-grandparents were murdered during the Holocaust. At the University of Minnesota, Kaufmann played on the Golden Gophers hockey team and studied accounting at the Carlson School of Management. Kaufmann was a Western Collegiate Hockey Association scholar-athlete pick all four years at Minnesota.

Kaufmann moved to Germany in 2008 and received German citizenship in order to play for the national team, DEG Metro Stars of Deutsche Eishockey Liga.

On February 16, 2012, Kaufmann agreed to leave DEG at season's end and signed with fellow DEL club, Nürnberg Ice Tigers, where he played through the 2014–15 season. In July 2015, he announced his retirement from ice hockey. He played a total of 315 games in the Deutsche Eishockey Liga and won 17 caps for the German Men's National Team, including seven outings at the 2012 World Championships.

== Career statistics ==
=== Regular season and playoffs ===
			Regular season					Playoffs
Season	Team	League	GP	G	A	Pts	PIM	GP	G	A	Pts	PIM
2003–04	River City Lancers	USHL	60	20	30	50	33	3	0	2	2	2
2004–05	University of Minnesota	WCHA	29	7	6	13	10	—	—	—	—	—
2005–06	University of Minnesota	WCHA	40	5	8	13	22	—	—	—	—	—
2006–07	University of Minnesota	WCHA	32	11	6	17	14	—	—	—	—	—
2007–08	University of Minnesota	WCHA	45	9	10	19	58	—	—	—	—	—
2008–09	DEG Metro Stars	DEL	44	9	17	26	24	16	2	0	2	8
2009–10	DEG Metro Stars	DEL	56	11	23	34	30	3	0	1	1	4
2010–11	DEG Metro Stars	DEL	52	21	24	45	22	9	1	3	4	6
2011–12	DEG Metro Stars	DEL	52	19	23	42	42	7	6	5	11	6
2012–13	Thomas Sabo Ice Tigers	DEL	16	4	7	11	12	3	1	1	2	2
2013–14	Thomas Sabo Ice Tigers	DEL	48	16	24	40	20	6	4	1	5	6
2014–15	Thomas Sabo Ice Tigers	DEL	47	12	16	28	22	5	0	0	0	4
DEL totals			315	92	134	226	172	49	14	11	25	36

=== International ===
Year	Team	Event	Result	GP	G	A	Pts	PIM
2012	Germany	WC	12th	7	0	1	1	4
Senior totals				7	0	1	1	4

== Career update ==
After retiring from professional hockey, Kaufmann began working as an investment banking analyst and was recently promoted to a vice president position.

== See also ==
- List of select Jewish ice hockey players
