= Ryan Bauer-Walsh =

American actor, singer, and visual artist

- Born: Ryan Bauer-Walsh; August 8 Minneapolis, Minnesota
- Education: The Hartt School of Music
- Occupation: Performer
- Years active: 2006–present

Ryan Bauer-Walsh is an American actor, singer, and visual artist.

As a performer, Bauer-Walsh has appeared in the first national tour of Billy Elliott, and as Jake in the 2014 Encores! production of The Most Happy Fella. He has also been featured in concerts at Birdland and 54 Below, and in 2015 reprised his performance of Jake at the Metropolitan Room with Broadway actor Arlo Hill. Bauer-Walsh also appeared as Zorro in the international tour of Zorro the musical, and Off Broadway as Pietro in the world premiere of the musical Death for Five Voices.

As an artist, Bauer-Walsh's illustrations and paintings have been used as set projections for the New York City Opera and the Coterie Opera, as well as appearing in private collections.
