= Minnesota State Highway 100 =

Highway in Minnesota

Trunk Highway 100
- MN 100 highlighted in red

Route information
- Maintained by MnDOT
- Length: 16.178 mi (26.036 km)
- Existed: 1934–present

Major junctions
- South end: I-494 / MN 5 / CSAH 34 at Bloomington
- MN 62 at Edina MN 7 / CSAH 25 at St. Louis Park; I-394 at Golden Valley; MN 55 at Golden Valley CSAH 81 at Robbinsdale
- North end: I-694 at Brooklyn Center

Location
- Country: United States
- State: Minnesota
- Counties: Hennepin

Highway system
- Minnesota Trunk Highway System; Interstate; US; State; Legislative; Scenic
← MN 99	→ MN 101

Minnesota State Highway 100 (MN 100) is a state highway in the Twin Cities region of Minnesota, which runs from its interchange with Interstate 494 (I-494) in Bloomington and continues north to its northern terminus at its interchange with I-694 in Brooklyn Center. The southern end of MN 100 continues in Bloomington as Normandale Boulevard (County Road 34, CR 34). At the north end, the main line of MN 100 merges with I-694 in Brooklyn Center. The route is 16 miles (26 km) in length.

== Route description ==
MN 100 serves as a north–south arterial route in the western suburbs of the Twin Cities. The roadway serves the communities of Bloomington, Edina, St. Louis Park, Golden Valley, Crystal, Robbinsdale and Brooklyn Center. MN 100 is constructed to freeway standards. The route is located in Hennepin County.

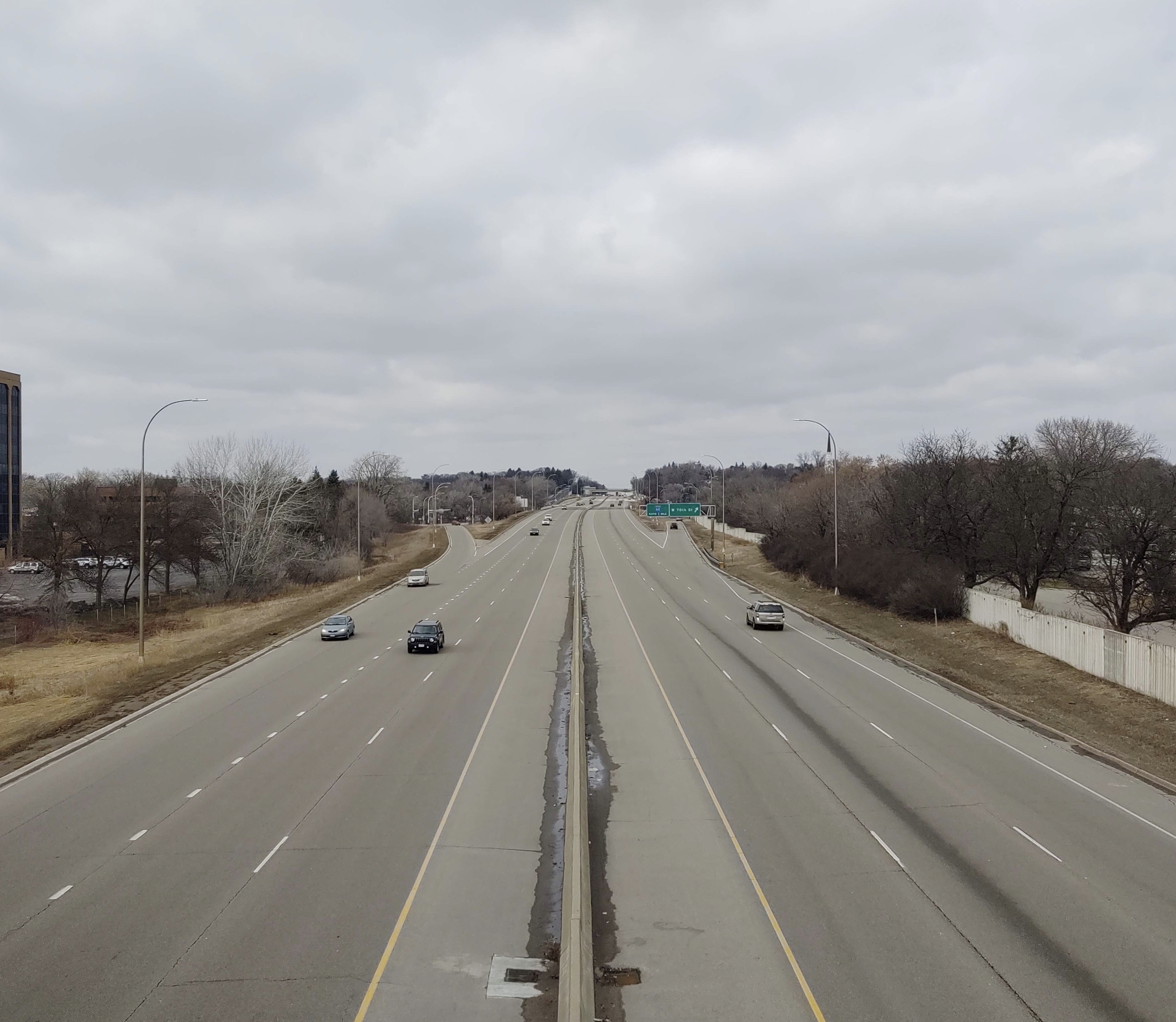
MN 100 in Edina

== History ==
=== Routing as a beltway ===
The route was authorized in 1934. MN 100 was originally meant as a beltway around the Twin Cities (presumably the reason for the round number) and actually achieved that status for about 20 years in the mid-20th century (although it wasn't a full freeway).

All of the current MN 100 was also in the original route. Starting from the current southern terminus, Old MN 100 was concurrent eastward with a pre-I-494 MN 5 past the Minneapolis-Saint Paul International Airport to its intersection with MN 55. Old MN 100 then continued east concurrent with MN 55 over the Mendota Bridge, then along current MN 62 through Mendota Heights, then MN 100 went on Southview Boulevard into South St. Paul. Then old MN 100 followed Grand Avenue downhill, until it met old MN 56 on Concord Street. Then old MN 100 followed south on Concord Street into Inver Grove Heights, then east over the railroad bridge into Newport; and then turning north onto Century Avenue in Woodbury, which feeds into current MN 120 north of I-94 in Maplewood / Oakdale. Old MN 100 then turned west upon County Road F and north along White Bear Avenue to meet up with and concurrent westward with old MN 96 (the section of which is now County Rd 96 in Vadnais Heights and Shoreview). Old MN 100 then turned south briefly along U.S. Highway 8 (US 8, now a city maintained street in New Brighton), then old MN 100 carried on westward along the current routing of I-694 through New Brighton and Fridley to meet back at its present-day northern terminus at Brooklyn Center.

Due to traffic pattern changes over the years, it is no longer possible to directly follow the path of old MN 100. Small detours are necessary which involve the use of exits 40 and 60 of the present I-494/I-694 beltway.

=== Lilac Way ===
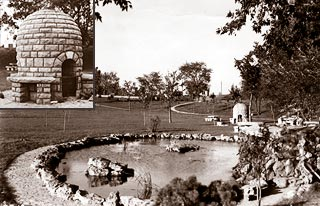
A historic view of Lilac Park with a rock garden and an ornamental pool. The inset shows one of the beehive grills.

The original construction of MN 100 started in 1935, as a New Deal project. The project was a cooperative venture between the Works Progress Administration (WPA) and the Minnesota Highway Department, and was the largest WPA project in the state. The demand for the highway came out of growing pains in the Twin Cities during the 1920s, when Minneapolis city streets were congested and suburban roads were poorly maintained dirt roads. The plan for a beltway around the Twin Cities incorporated existing roads, both paved and unpaved. A new section of highway, between MN 5 (now I-494 and MN 5) in Edina and then-US 52 (now CR 81) in Robbinsdale was needed to complete the beltway. As such, it was planned as a state-of-the-art highway, with two lanes in each direction separated by wide medians, bridges at major intersections and railroad crossings, and the first cloverleaf interchanges in Minnesota.

Carl Graeser, the highway engineer and Arthur R. Nichols, a landscape architect, teamed up to design the highway. A large number of WPA workers worked on the construction of the highway. Since the WPA was designed to keep a large number of workers busy, a lot of hand digging was done as opposed to using bulldozers. Cloverleaf interchanges were built at MN 7, US 12 (now I-394 and US 12) and MN 55 (Olson Highway).

The landscaping of the highway was meant to give the highway a parkway-like experience. As such, it was built with a wider right-of-way than the typical highway. The Golden Valley Garden Club supported efforts to plant lilacs along the highway and the Minneapolis Journal coined the name "Lilac Way". Eventually, 7,000 lilacs were planted. In addition, the builders built five wayside parks along the way. These parks were intended for picnicking and featured stone picnic tables, beehive barbecues, waterfalls and so on. These fixtures provided work for local stonemasons, as another part of the WPA project. The western leg was completed in 1940, but further construction on the beltway was halted with the United States' entry into World War II. An extension from then-US 52 (now CR 81) in Robbinsdale to US 10 (near present-day I-35W) in New Brighton was built with federal aid to provide access to industrial areas as an asset to the manufacture of "essential war materials".

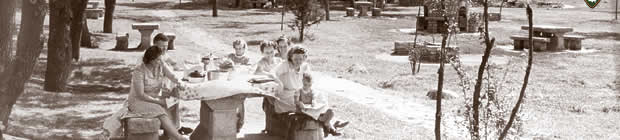
A picnic area shown in a 1939 view of Lilac Park along MN 100

Graeser Park in Robbinsdale and the St. Louis Park Roadside Park (near the southeast corner of MN 100 and MN 7) are the only remaining roadside parks from the 1930s that are still mostly intact after widening of MN 100.

The beltline was not completed until 1950. At that point, demand from the baby boom led to rapid growth in the suburbs.

In 2009, restoration of the St. Louis Park Roadside Park was completed and the park renamed Lilac Park. As part of the restoration project, a beehive fireplace from the old Lilac Park to the north was transferred and restored. A new bicycle/walkway path constructed within the park connects the park to the Southwest LRT Trail.

=== Recent construction ===
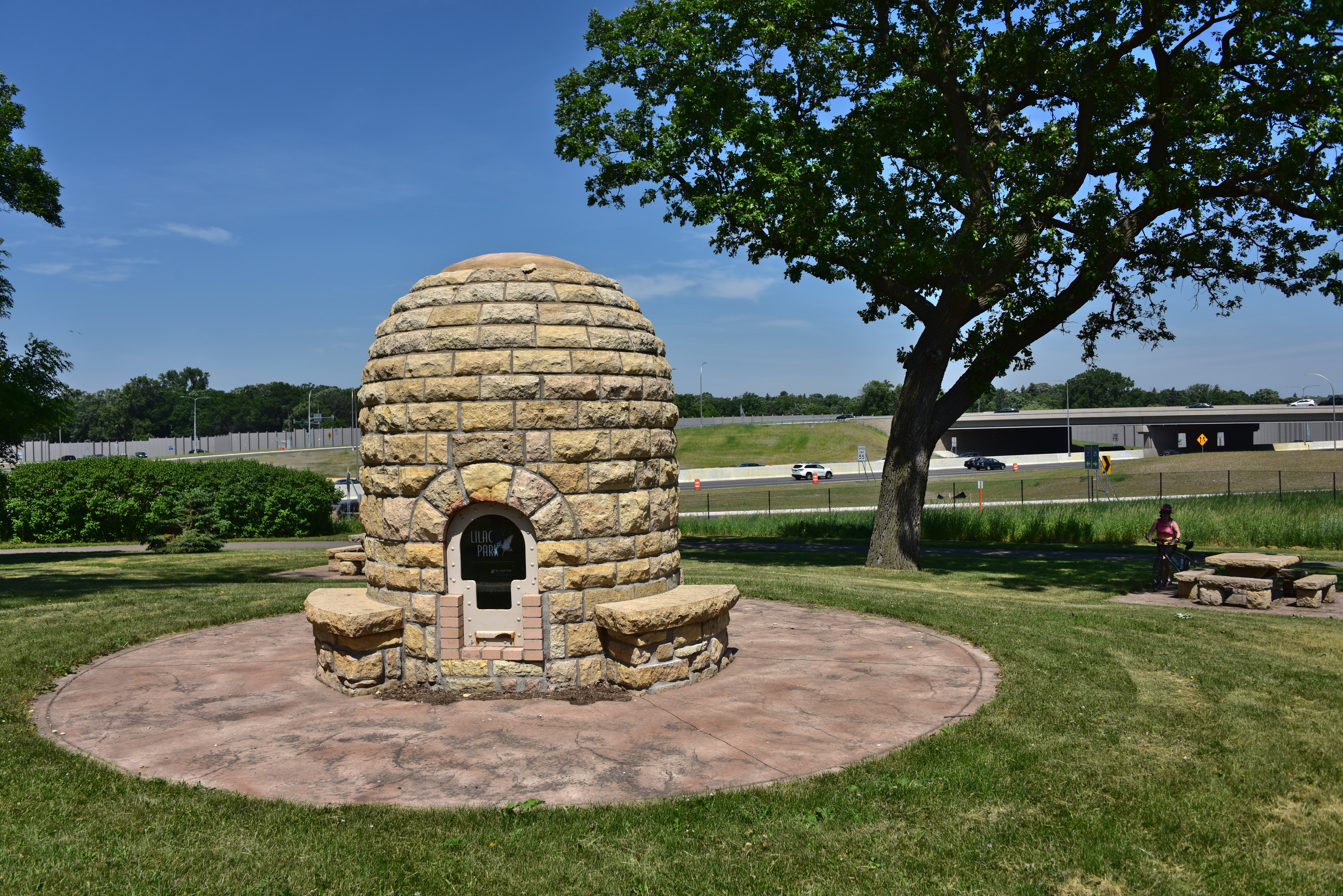
Lilac Park beehive grill in its new location

Conversion of the remaining portion of the road into a freeway is complete. In 2004, construction was finished on the northern portion of MN 100 between I-394 and I-694, making MN 100 a freeway for its entire length.

The section between MN 7 and I-394 in St. Louis Park, the oldest part of the freeway, was reconstructed into a 6-lane freeway, completed in Nov. 2016. MN 100 is now 6 lanes from just north of the I-494 interchange in Edina, to the interchange at Bottineau Boulevard (County Road 81) in Robbinsdale.

As part of these projects, 2 of the original 3 cloverleaf intersections were replaced. The cloverleaf at MN 55 in Golden Valley was changed and rebuilt in 2004 as a signalized single-point urban interchange (SPUI). The cloverleaf at MN 7/CR 25 was replaced with a folded diamond interchange. The remaining cloverleaf is at the I-394 interchange.

The original Lilac Park in St. Louis Park was also lost to this construction. Several of the park's WPA-built stone picnic tables and a beehive fireplace were saved and relocated to the remaining portion of St. Louis Park Roadside Park, which was then renamed Lilac Park.

In October 2020, Hwy. 100's speed limit was increased to 60 miles per hour (100 km/h) for its entire length. It was originally 55 miles per hour (88 km/h) south of County Road 81 in Robbinsdale to its terminus in Bloomington.

== Exit list ==
The entire route is in Hennepin County.

Location	mi	km	Exit	Destinations	Notes
Bloomington	0.00	0.00	-	I-494 / MN 5 – Minneapolis-St. Paul International Airport	I-494 exit 7; southern terminus of MN 100.
Edina	0.359	0.578	-	Industrial Boulevard, West 77th Street	
Edina	1.184	1.905	-	West 70th Street	
Edina	2.115	3.404	-	MN 62	
Edina	2.601	4.186	-	Benton Avenue	Southbound exit and northbound entrance
Edina	3.549– 3.879	5.712– 6.243	-	CR 158 (Vernon Avenue)	Interchange being rebuilt into a diamond in 2025
St. Louis Park	4.931	7.936	-	CR 3 (Excelsior Boulevard)	
St. Louis Park	5.456	8.781	-	West 36th Street	
St. Louis Park	5.875	9.455	-	MN 7 west / CR 25 east	
St. Louis Park	6.208	9.991	-	CR 5 (Minnetonka Boulevard)	
St. Louis Park	7.137– 7.183	11.486– 11.560	-	Barry Street, Cedar Lake Road, Westside Drive	Northbound exit signed Barry Street and Cedar Lake Road; southbound exit signed Westside Drive and Cedar Lake Road
Golden Valley	7.785	12.529	-	I-394 – Minneapolis	I-394 exit 5B
Golden Valley	8.322	13.393	-	CR 40 (Glenwood Avenue)	
Golden Valley	8.902	14.326	8B	MN 55 (Olson Memorial Highway)	SPUI interchange; interchange reconstructed in 2003
Golden Valley	9.900	15.933	9	CR 66 (Duluth Street)	
Crystal	11.435	18.403	11	36th Avenue North	Converted from an at-grade to an interchange in 2003; former MN 278
Crystal	12.162	19.573	12A	CR 9 (42nd Avenue North)	Interchange reconstructed in 2003
Robbinsdale	12.544– 12.565	20.188– 20.221	12B	CR 81	Access from MN 100 north to CR 81 south and CR 81 north to MN 100 south is via CR 9; converted from an at-grade to an interchange in 2003
Brooklyn Center	13.317	21.432	13	France Avenue	Converted from an at-grade to an interchange in 2003
Brooklyn Center	14.034	22.586	14	CR 152 (Brooklyn Boulevard) / Xerxes Avenue	
Brooklyn Center	15.018	24.169	15A	CR 10 west (Bass Lake Road) / CR 57 east (57th Avenue North) / John Martin Drive	
Brooklyn Center	15.785	25.403	15B	To I-94 / I-694 west / Humboldt Avenue	Northbound exit and southbound entrance
Brooklyn Center	16.178	26.036	-	I-694 east	I-694 exit 35A; northbound exit and southbound entrance; northern terminus of MN 100. Road continues north as Humboldt Avenue.
1.000 mi = 1.609 km; 1.000 km = 0.621 mi: Incomplete access
