= Education Minnesota =

Teacher's labor union

- Education Minnesota
- Founded: 1998
- Headquarters: Saint Paul, Minnesota
- Location: United States
- Members: 86,000
- Key people: Denise Specht, president
- Affiliations: NEA, AFT
- Website: www.educationminnesota.org

Education Minnesota is an American labor union representing pre-K to 12 education teachers, school support staff and higher education faculty in Minnesota. It is affiliated with both the National Education Association (NEA) and the American Federation of Teachers (AFT), and is affiliated with the AFL-CIO.

The union's headquarters are located in St. Paul, Minnesota, and it represented more than 90,000 members in 2017. An annual Representative Convention of approximately 900 elected delegates meets each year, and is the organization's highest governing body. Between Representative Conventions, a 44-member governing board meets monthly. The governing board sets dues, establishes a budget and carries out the policy directives of the Representative Convention. Three full-time officers — a president, vice president and secretary-treasurer — guide the union between meetings of the governing board. Education Minnesota employed about 170 staff in 2017.

Education Minnesota’s MEA conference is held on the third weekend in October. It is a break during the school year known as the "MEA weekend".

== Merger ==
The union was created in March 1997 by the merger of the Minnesota Education Association (MEA) and the Minnesota Federation of Teachers (MFT). The merger was approved by both parent unions, and took effect on Sept. 1, 1998. At the time, the AFT and NEA were discussing a national merger. The two unions had increasingly collaborated for several years, and the merger of the two unions was considered a precursor to national merger. Subsequently, neither parent union laid down many ground rules for the merger.

The planned merger between the AFT and NEA fell through after the merger agreement, which had been approved by the AFT, failed to win the necessary two-thirds majority at the NEA convention.

Education Minnesota — which was affiliated with both the AFT and NEA — remained unaffected by the failed national merger. Judy Schaubach, president of MEA, and Sandra Peterson, president of MFT, were elected as co-presidents. But the lack of pre-merger ground rules came back to haunt the merged union. Disagreement between the two parent unions broke out over payment of per capita dues. Each parent union insisted that it receive its full dues, which would have doubled the dues of Education Minnesota members. The issue remained unresolved for two years, until an agreement was reached that established a new dues level. Back dues to NEA were paid down, while AFT forgave its anticipated dues.

== Impact on other NEA/AFT mergers ==
Several NEA and AFT state and local teacher unions had merged in the 1960s and 1970s, including affiliates in San Francisco, Los Angeles, and New Orleans, and throughout Florida. The Education Minnesota merger had encouraged other NEA and AFT state teacher unions in the United States to consider a merger as well. The Montana Education Association and Montana Federation of Teachers merged in September 2000, and discussions were under way in Missouri, New Mexico, New York and Texas. Meanwhile, in 26 states NEA and AFT state affiliates had signed "no-raid" agreements, which set jurisdictions for each state affiliate and prohibited each union from absorbing the other.

Meanwhile, AFT president Sandra Feldman publicly voiced her conclusion that state mergers would continue until a de facto merger of the two unions occurred.

Both parent unions recognized a need for ground rules before any additional state mergers. Each union adopted a series of guidelines for approval of state mergers. Through the NEA-AFT joint council, "NEAFT," the AFT and NEA agreed to additional guidelines that must be met for future state mergers to move forward smoothly.

== Minnesota Educator Academy ==
The annual Minnesota Educator Academy ("MEA"), previously known as the Education Minnesota Professional Conference, is the largest professional development opportunity for educators in Minnesota. It takes place the third Thursday in October. Those days, students do not have classes, enabling educators in Minnesota to attend the conference, although many do not attend. The "MEA weekend" is one of the busiest travel times in Minnesota, even busier than Thanksgiving. In 2020, it became the biggest travel week since the first impacts of the COVID-19 pandemic.

== See also ==
- List of education trade unions
