= Robbinsdale, Minnesota =

City in Minnesota, United States

- City
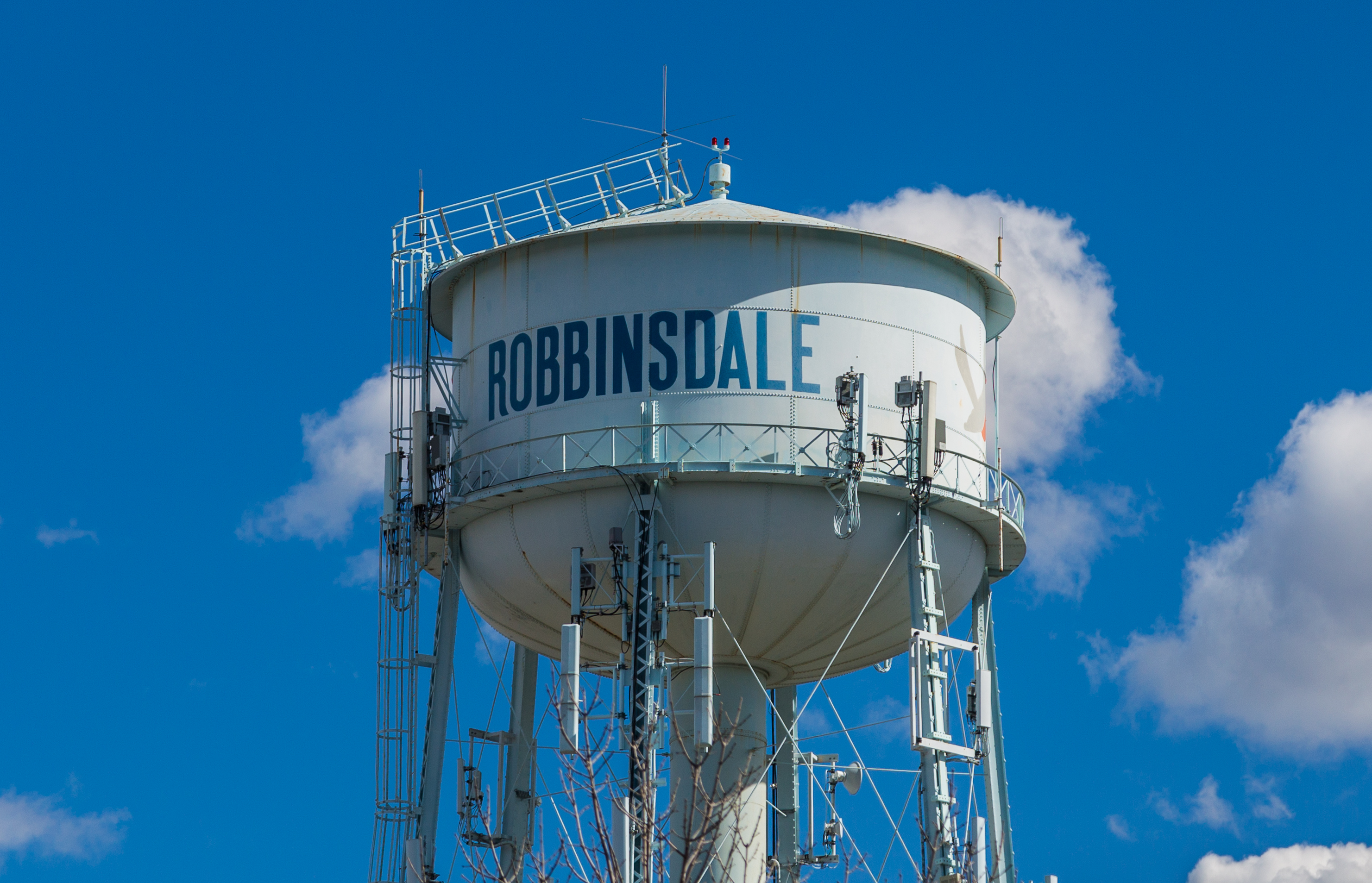

- Logo
- Nickname: Birdtown
- Location of the city of Robbinsdale within Hennepin County, Minnesota
- Coordinates: 45°1′35″N 93°20′5″W
- Country: United States
- State: Minnesota
- County: Hennepin
- Founded: 1893

Government
  - Mayor: Bill Blonigan

Area
  - City: 2.99 sq mi (7.74 km^{2})
  - Land: 2.80 sq mi (7.24 km^{2})
  - Water: 0.19 sq mi (0.50 km^{2})
- Elevation: 873 ft (266 m)

Population (2020)
  - City: 14,646
  - Estimate (2023): 13,968
  - Density: 5,240.2/sq mi (2,023.25/km^{2})
  - Metro: 3,524,583
- Time zone: UTC-6 (Central)
  - Summer (DST): UTC-5 (Central)
- ZIP code: 55422
- Area code: 763
- FIPS code: 27-54808
- GNIS feature ID: 0650164
- Website: www.robbinsdalemn.gov

Robbinsdale is a city in Hennepin County, Minnesota, United States. Its population was 14,646 at the 2020 census. The city is in the Minneapolis–Saint Paul metropolitan area and is adjacent to the northwest portion of Minneapolis.

== Geography ==
According to the United States Census Bureau, the city has an area of 2.98 square miles (7.72 km^{2}), of which 2.79 square miles (7.23 km^{2}) is land and 0.19 square miles (0.49 km^{2}) is water.

Minnesota State Highway 100 and County Road 81 are two of the main routes in the city.

== History ==
Shortly after the Minnesota Territorial Legislature created Hennepin County in 1852, John C. Bohanon filed the first claim in the Township of Crystal Lake. Railroads reached the area in 1880. A flag station was established near the farm of Alfred Parker, and six years later he donated land for a depot. The community that grew around it came to be known as Parker's Station. In 1887 Minneapolis made an effort to secure more taxable property by annexing neighboring townships. In response, Crystal Lake farmers incorporated the Village of Crystal.

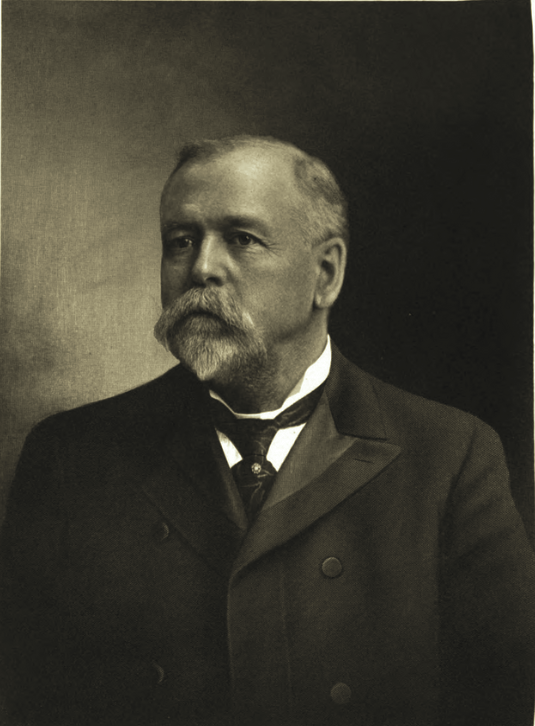
Andrew Bonney Robbins

Later that year, entrepreneur, civil war veteran, and real estate developer Andrew Bonney Robbins came to Parker's Station on behalf of an Illinois business interest. Robbins was a former state senator and the brother-in-law of lumber baron Thomas Barlow Walker. Robbins purchased 90 acres (360,000 m2) to the west of Lower Twin Lake to incorporate into the Robbinsdale Park subdivision.

From 1888, new industries moved in and a large Lutheran seminary was built. In 1890, Robbins built a 16-room Queen Anne-style mansion on Lower Twin Lake. After he moved his family in, Robbins found investors to build the Hubbard Specialty Manufacturing Company. This firm made chairs and wheelbarrows. Despite his connections, Robbins could not persuade the Minneapolis Street Railway Company to extend a streetcar line up West Broadway. In 1891 he organized the North Side Street Railway Company and built his own line from the Minneapolis city limits to Robbinsdale Park. The streetcars were pulled by horses until the line was converted to electricity.

Robbins's development efforts led to tension between farm families and residents near the village center. A special election was held and a vote to dissolve the Village of Crystal carried unanimously. On April 19, 1893, the 2.9-square-mile village of Robbinsdale was organized.

Fawcett Publications was founded in 1919 in Robbinsdale with the publication of Captain Billy's Whiz Bang. In 1922, Fawcett introduced True Confessions magazine, which was popular among female readers. The city's pulp magazine history is echoed in Robbinsdale's annual summer celebration, Whiz Bang Days. In 1929, Fawcett launched Modern Mechanics, a magazine on ingenuity and do-it-yourself projects. The first issue's cover line was "Build your own airplane!". Modern Mechanics was later renamed Mechanix Illustrated. In 1930, Fawcett Publications moved to downtown Minneapolis's Sexton Building.

In 1940, Samuel Samuelson built Victory Hospital on property he owned in Robbinsdale. The original marble-faced, three-story building had five operating rooms and 70 beds. In 1954, Victory Hospital was reorganized as a nonprofit and renamed North Memorial. Over the next 50 years, it grew into a 518-bed medical center. Today, North Memorial Medical Center is a regional trauma center with eight helicopters, 120 ambulances, and 725 employees. It is one of Minnesota's Level 1 trauma centers and operates AirCare, an air medical transport service with five flight bases around the state.

In 1951, Sidney and William Volk hired the architectural firm Liebenberg and Kaplan to redesign the Terrace Theatre. Situated on a rise overlooking Crystal Lake and Bottineau Boulevard, the theater was considered an example of mid-century modern design. Its rectangular volumes originally contained a 1300-seat auditorium, an expansive lobby, a sunken garden-style lounge with a large copper fireplace, sweeping foyers, and two snack bars.

The Terrace closed in 1999 and its owner did not take care of the property. In 2016, the City of Robbinsdale and State of Minnesota passed resolutions commemorating the Terrace as an important historic landmark. Nevertheless, after some debate and a lawsuit, the Terrace was torn down in 2016 and replaced by a Hy-Vee grocery store.

== Education ==
Robbinsdale is served by Robbinsdale Area Schools.

There are two public schools and one parochial school within the city limits:

- Lakeview Elementary School (PreK through 5th grade)
- Robbinsdale Middle School (6th though 8th grades)
- Sacred Heart Catholic School (PreK through 8th grade)

== Demographics ==
Historical population
Census	Pop.	Note	%±
1890	1,074		—
1900	520		−51.6%
1910	765		47.1%
1920	1,369		79.0%
1930	4,427		223.4%
1940	6,018		35.9%
1950	11,289		87.6%
1960	16,381		45.1%
1970	16,845		2.8%
1980	14,422		−14.4%
1990	14,396		−0.2%
2000	14,123		−1.9%
2010	13,953		−1.2%
2020	14,646		5.0%
2023 (est.)	13,968		−4.6%
U.S. Decennial Census; 2020 Census

=== 2020 census ===
As of the 2020 census, Robbinsdale had a population of 14,646. The median age was 38.2 years. 20.3% of residents were under the age of 18, 6.8% were under the age of 5, and 15.1% were 65 years of age or older. For every 100 females, there were 94.5 males, and for every 100 females age 18 and over, there were 92.0 males age 18 and over.

100.0% of residents lived in urban areas, while 0.0% lived in rural areas.

There were 6,289 households in Robbinsdale, of which 26.4% had children under the age of 18 living in them. Of all households, 37.7% were married-couple households, 20.4% were households with a male householder and no spouse or partner present, and 32.0% were households with a female householder and no spouse or partner present. About 33.7% of all households were made up of individuals, and 13.1% had someone living alone who was 65 years of age or older.

There were 6,510 housing units, of which 3.4% were vacant. The homeowner vacancy rate was 0.8% and the rental vacancy rate was 5.5%.

Racial composition as of the 2020 census
Race	Number	Percent
White	10,029	68.5%
Black or African American	2,260	15.4%
American Indian and Alaska Native	138	0.9%
Asian	452	3.1%
Native Hawaiian and Other Pacific Islander	3	0.0%
Some other race	466	3.2%
Two or more races	1,298	8.9%
Hispanic or Latino (of any race)	970	6.6%

=== Demographic estimates ===
According to the U.S. Census Bureau QuickFacts, Robbinsdale had 2.19 people per household. QuickFacts also reported that 94% of residents age 25 and older held a high school diploma or higher degree, while 36.8% of residents age 25 and older held a bachelor's or higher degree.

=== 2010 census ===
As of the census of 2010, there were 13,953 people, 6,032 households, and 3,375 families residing in the city. The population density was 5,001.1 inhabitants per square mile (1,930.9/km^{2}). There were 6,416 housing units at an average density of 2,299.6 per square mile (887.9/km^{2}). The racial makeup of the city was 76.5% White, 13.8% African American, 0.5% Native American, 3.3% Asian, 0.1% Pacific Islander, 1.9% from other races, and 3.9% from two or more races. Hispanic or Latino of any race were 4.6% of the population.

There were 6,032 households, of which 28.0% had children under the age of 18 living with them, 39.6% were married couples living together, 12.5% had a female householder with no husband present, 3.9% had a male householder with no wife present, and 44.0% were non-families. 35.7% of all households were made up of individuals, and 12.5% had someone living alone who was 65 years of age or older. The average household size was 2.28 and the average family size was 2.99.

The median age in the city was 36.9 years. 22% of residents were under the age of 18; 7.4% were between the ages of 18 and 24; 32.3% were from 25 to 44; 26% were from 45 to 64; and 12.4% were 65 years of age or older. The gender makeup of the city was 47.6% male and 52.4% female.

=== 2000 census ===
As of the census of 2000, there were 14,123 people, 6,097 households, and 3,524 families residing in the city. The population density was 5,076.0 inhabitants per square mile (1,959.9/km^{2}). There were 6,243 housing units at an average density of 2,243.8 per square mile (866.3/km^{2}). The racial makeup of the city was 88.9% White, 5.7% African American, 0.6% Native American, 2.1% Asian, <0.1% Pacific Islander, 1.0% from other races, and 1.7% from two or more races. Hispanic or Latino of any race were 2.0% of the population.

There were 6,097 households, out of which 26.7% had children under the age of 18 living with them, 43.7% were married couples living together, 10.6% had a female householder with no husband present, and 42.2% were non-families. 34.2% of all households were made up of individuals, and 15.6% had someone living alone who was 65 years of age or older. The average household size was 2.26 and the average family size was 2.93.

In the city, the population was spread out, with 21.7% under the age of 18, 6.8% from 18 to 24, 34.4% from 25 to 44, 19.5% from 45 to 64, and 17.5% who were 65 years of age or older. The median age was 38 years. For every 100 females, there were 91.8 males. For every 100 females age 18 and over, there were 87.8 males.

The median income for a household in the city was $48,271, and the median income for a family was $57,185. Males had a median income of $37,406 versus $30,771 for females. The per capita income for the city was $23,912. About 2.0% of families and 4.7% of the population were below the poverty line, including 2.8% of those under age 18 and 7.0% of those age 65 or over.

== Politics ==
The City of Robbinsdale is a Charter City establishing the "Council-Manager Plan", under which the Robbinsdale City Council sets the policy direction and the city manager is responsible for the administration of the city, including day-to-day operations and hiring city staff. The city council comprises a mayor and four council members. The mayor is the council's presiding officer. The mayor and council have equal votes on all motions. The city manager is appointed for an indefinite period and can be removed by the council at any time by a three-fifths vote.

Regan Murphy served as mayor from 2013 to 2021. Bill Blonigan was elected mayor in 2020 after serving as Ward 1 council member since 1981. Brad Sutton was sworn in as mayor on January 7, 2025.

Robbinsdale is in Minnesota's 5th congressional district, represented by Ilhan Omar. It is represented in the Minnesota Legislature by State Senator Ann Rest and State Representative Mike Freiberg. Jeffrey Lunde represents Robbinsdale on the Hennepin County Board of Commissioners.

Presidential election results 1960–2020

Precinct General Election Results
Year	Republican	Democratic	Third parties
2020	24.4% 2,190	72.8% 6,543	2.8% 260
2016	25.7% 2,074	64.8% 5,223	9.5% 761
2012	31.9% 2,690	65.3% 5,509	2.8% 240
2008	32.6% 2,745	65.1% 5,479	2.3% 193
2004	36.5% 3,011	62.1% 5,122	1.4% 119
2000	36.3% 2,811	55.9% 4,329	7.8% 602
1996	29.7% 2,158	59.8% 4,342	10.5% 759
1992	28.5% 2,452	49.1% 4,224	22.4% 1,928
1988	40.8% 3,415	59.2% 4,945	0.0% 0
1984	44.2% 3,830	55.8% 4,837	0.0% 0
1980	35.7% 3,171	53.5% 4,759	10.8% 966
1976	39.6% 3,606	57.9% 5,278	2.5% 224
1972	50.8% 4,498	46.8% 4,150	2.4% 215
1968	37.6% 3,144	58.1% 4,853	4.3% 363
1964	33.7% 2,631	66.0% 5,153	0.3% 21
1960	49.1% 4,003	50.6% 4,127	0.3% 430

== Gun sales ==
From 2017 to 2021, the federal Alcohol and Firearms (ATF) traced more guns used in Minnesota crimes to Robbinsdale as a point of origin than any other city.

== Notable people ==
- Angeline Appel (born 1993), she is an actress, known for Step Up Revolution (2012), The Unhealer (2020) and Vandal (2019).
- David Backes (born 1984), National Hockey League player
- Ryan Bauer-Walsh, actor, singer, and visual artist
- Brady Boone (1958–1998), professional wrestler
- Brother Ali (born 1977), rapper and community activist
- Philando Castile (born 1983), black man killed by police in 2016 on live video while he was complying with a traffic stop
- Barry Darsow (born 1959), professional wrestler
- David Durenberger (1934–2023), a Republican member of the United States Senate from 1978 to 1995
- Greg Gagne (born 1948), professional wrestler
- Verne Gagne (1926–2015), professional wrestler
- Dennie Gordon, film and television director
- James C. Heap (1935–2013), Minnesota state representative
- Larry Hennig (1936–2018), professional wrestler
- Curt Hennig (1958–2003), professional wrestler
- The Jets (Minnesota band), Platinum selling pop music group
- Marjorie Johnson (1919–2025), award-winning baker
- Trent Klatt (born 1971), professional ice hockey player
- Nikita Koloff (born 1959), professional wrestler
- John Kundla (1916–2017), college and professional basketball coach, the first head coach for the Minneapolis Lakers
- Leonard Lilyholm (born 1941), ice hockey player
- Bam Neely (born 1975), professional wrestler
- Scott Norton (born 1961), professional wrestler
- Gene Okerlund (1942–2019), announcer and interviewer for the World Wrestling Federation and World Championship Wrestling
- Mike Opat (born 1961), politician
- Brittany Petros (born 1974), is an actress, known for Birds of Prey (2020), The Fabelmans (2022) and The First Purge (2018).
- Lance Pitlick (born 1967), professional ice hockey player
- Alec Richards (born 1987), professional ice hockey player
- Rick Rude (1958–1999), professional wrestler
- Lil Shine (born 2005), artist
- Kathryn Leigh Scott (born 1943), Playboy Bunny and actress
- Leah Thorvilson (born 1979), racing cyclist, and former long-distance runner
- Tim Vakoc (1960–2009), first U.S. military chaplain to die from wounds received in the Iraq War
- Bee Vang (born 1991), actor
- Rashad Vaughn professional basketball player
- Sean Waltman (born 1972), professional wrestler,
- Rodney Williams (basketball) (born 1991) professional basketball player
- Blake Wheeler (born 1986), professional hockey player
- Steve Zahn (born 1967), actor,
- Tom Zenk (1958–2017), professional wrestler
