= Big Jim Mountain =

Mountain in Washington (state), United States

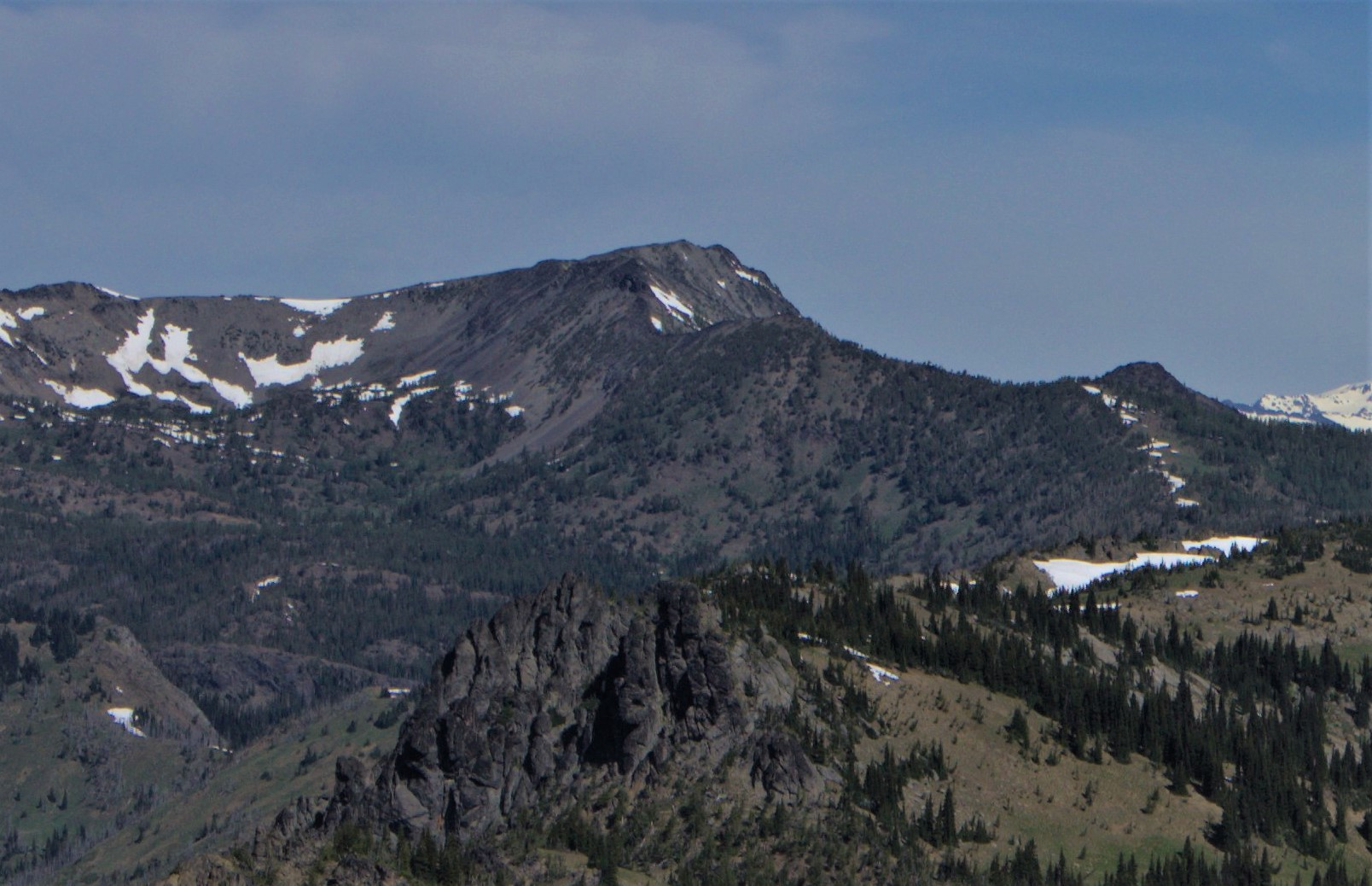
- Big Jim from southeast

Highest point
- Elevation: 7,763 ft (2,366 m)
- Prominence: 483 ft (147 m)
- Parent peak: Big Lou (7,780+ ft)
- Isolation: 1.75 mi (2.82 km)
- Coordinates: 47°39′45″N 120°49′56″W

Geography
- Location within Washington (state) Location within the United States
- Location: Chelan County; Washington state, U.S.
- Parent range: Chiwaukum Mountains; Wenatchee Mountains; Cascade Range
- Topo map: USGS Big Jim Mountain

Geology
- Rock age: Late Cretaceous
- Rock type: Tonalitic plutons

Climbing
- Easiest route: class 2 hiking South ridge

Big Jim Mountain is a 7,763-foot (2,366-metre) mountain summit located in Chelan County of Washington state. It is situated 9 mi (14 km) northwest of Leavenworth, within the Alpine Lakes Wilderness, on land managed by the Okanogan–Wenatchee National Forest. Big Jim Mountain is the fourth-highest peak in the Chiwaukum Mountains, a subset of the Cascade Range. Its nearest higher neighbor is Big Lou, 1.75 mi (2.82 km) to the south-southwest, and Cape Horn is set 4 mi (6.4 km) to the west. Precipitation runoff from Big Jim drains into tributaries of the Wenatchee River. Although modest in elevation, relief is significant since Big Jim rises 2,300 feet above Painter Creek Valley in one mile. Big Jim Mountain is named for Jim Whittaker, the first American to summit Mount Everest and twin brother of Lou Whittaker.

== Climate ==
Most weather fronts originate in the Pacific Ocean, and travel east toward the Cascade Mountains. As fronts approach, they are forced upward by the peaks of the Cascade Range, causing them to drop their moisture in the form of rain or snowfall onto the Cascades (Orographic lift). As a result, the Cascades experience high precipitation, especially during the winter months in the form of snowfall. During winter months, weather is usually cloudy, but, due to high pressure systems over the Pacific Ocean that intensify during summer months, there is often little or no cloud cover during the summer. The months June through October offer the most favorable weather for viewing or climbing this peak.

== Geology ==
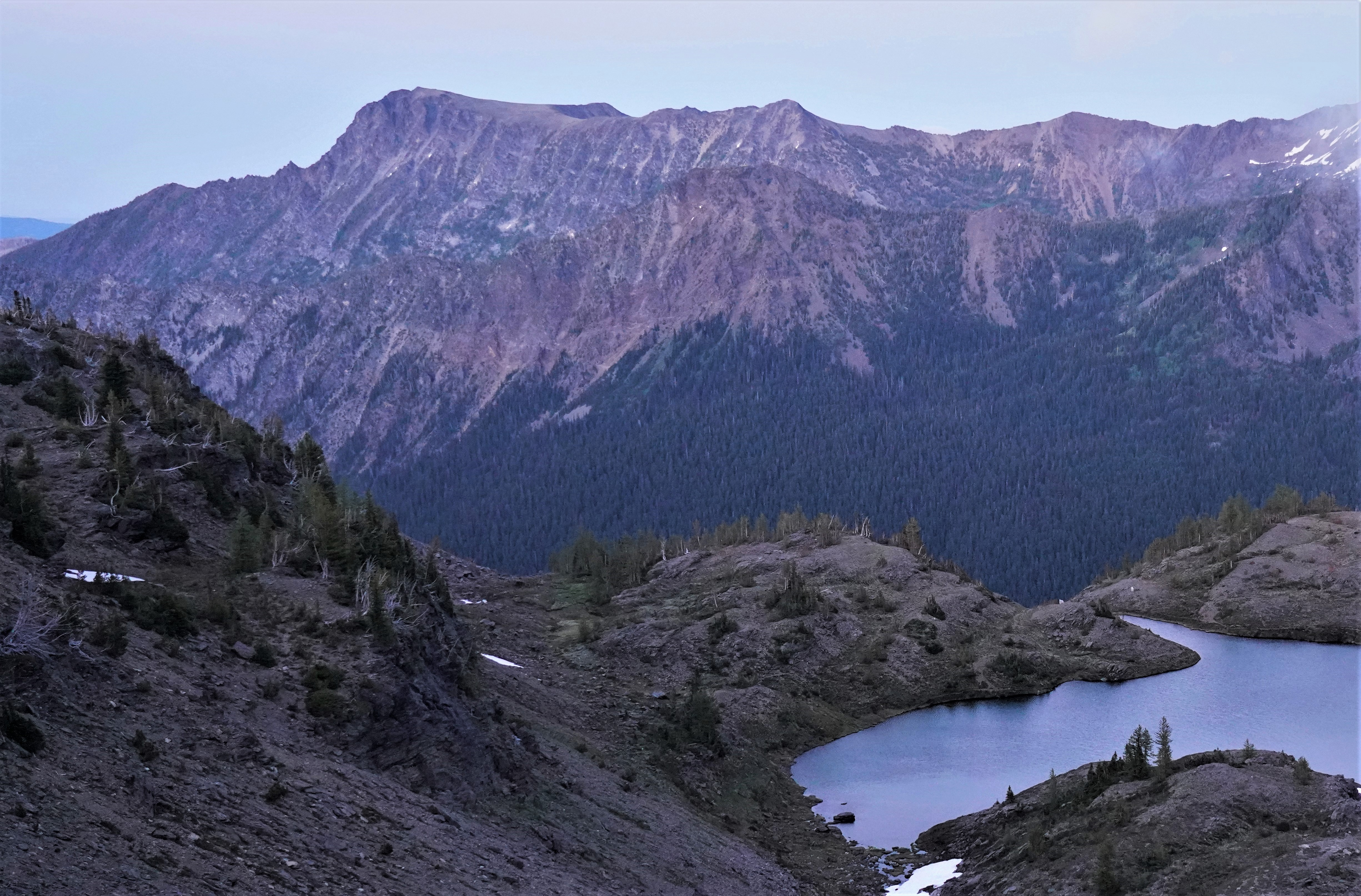
Big Jim from the west

The Alpine Lakes Wilderness features some of the most rugged topography in the Cascade Range with craggy peaks and ridges, deep glacial valleys, and granite walls spotted with over 700 mountain lakes. Geological events occurring many years ago created the diverse topography and drastic elevation changes over the Cascade Range leading to the various climate differences.

During the Pleistocene period dating back over two million years ago, glaciation advancing and retreating repeatedly scoured the landscape leaving deposits of rock debris. The last glacial retreat in the Alpine Lakes area began about 14,000 years ago and was north of the Canada–US border by 10,000 years ago. The U-shaped cross section of the river valleys is a result of that recent glaciation. Uplift and faulting in combination with glaciation have been the dominant processes which have created the tall peaks and deep valleys of the Alpine Lakes Wilderness area.

== See also ==
- List of peaks of the Alpine Lakes Wilderness
