= Grindstone Mountain (Washington) =

Mountain in Washington (state), United States

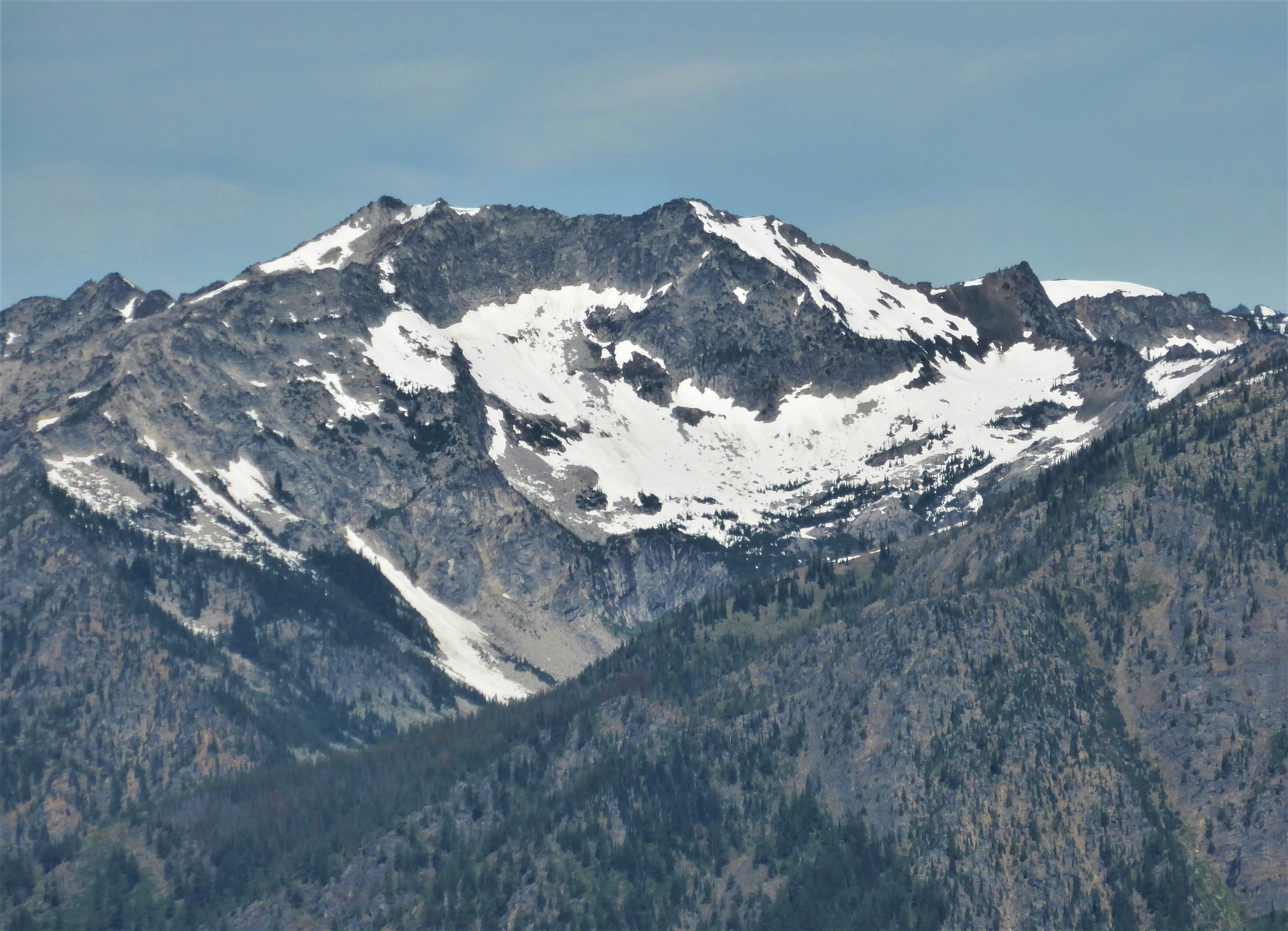
- Grindstone from east-southeast

Highest point
- Elevation: 7,533 ft (2,296 m)
- Prominence: 853 ft (260 m)
- Parent peak: Ladies Peak (7,708 ft)
- Isolation: 2.2 mi (3.5 km)
- Coordinates: 47°38′12″N 120°54′48″W

Geography
- Location within Washington (state) Location within the United States
- Country: United States
- State: Washington
- County: Chelan
- Protected area: Alpine Lakes Wilderness
- Parent range: Chiwaukum Mountains; Wenatchee Mountains; Cascade Range
- Topo map: USGS Chiwaukum Mountains

Geology
- Rock age: Late Cretaceous
- Rock type: Tonalitic plutons

Climbing
- Easiest route: Chatter Creek Trail + scrambling

Grindstone Mountain is a 7,533-foot (2,296-metre) mountain summit located in the Icicle Creek Valley in Chelan County of Washington state. Grindstone Mountain is situated 12 mi (19 km) west of Leavenworth, within the Alpine Lakes Wilderness, on land managed by the Okanogan–Wenatchee National Forest. Grindstone Mountain is the seventh-highest peak in the Chiwaukum Mountains, a subset of the Cascade Range. Its nearest higher neighbor is Ladies Peak, 2.2 mi (3.5 km) to the north-northwest, and Cape Horn is set 1.4 mi (2.3 km) to the north. Precipitation runoff from Grindstone drains into Icicle Creek, which is a tributary of the Wenatchee River. Although modest in elevation, relief is significant since Grindstone rises 4,700 feet above Icicle Creek Valley in less than two miles. Grindstone Mountain was named by Albert Hale Sylvester in association with Grindstone Creek, which flows from Sylvester Lake on this mountain's southwest slope. Sylvester found a small grindstone which had fallen from a pack horse fording the creek.

== Climate ==
Weather fronts arriving from the Pacific Ocean travel east toward the Cascade Mountains. As fronts approach, they are forced upward by the peaks of the Cascade Range, causing them to drop their moisture in the form of rain or snowfall onto the Cascades (orographic lift). As a result, the Cascades experience high precipitation, especially during the winter months in the form of snowfall. During winter months, weather is usually cloudy, but due to high pressure systems over the Pacific Ocean that intensify during summer months, there is often little or no cloud cover during the summer. The months June through October offer the most favorable weather for viewing or climbing this peak.

== Geology ==
The Alpine Lakes Wilderness features some of the most rugged topography in the Cascade Range with craggy peaks and ridges, deep glacial valleys, and granite walls spotted with over 700 mountain lakes. Geological events occurring many years ago created the diverse topography and drastic elevation changes over the Cascade Range leading to the various climate differences.

During the Pleistocene period dating back over two million years ago, glaciation advancing and retreating repeatedly scoured the landscape leaving deposits of rock debris. The last glacial retreat in the Alpine Lakes area began about 14,000 years ago and was north of the Canada–US border by 10,000 years ago. The U-shaped cross section of the river valleys is a result of that recent glaciation. Uplift and faulting in combination with glaciation have been the dominant processes which have created the tall peaks and deep valleys of the Alpine Lakes Wilderness area.

== See also ==
- List of peaks of the Alpine Lakes Wilderness

== Gallery ==
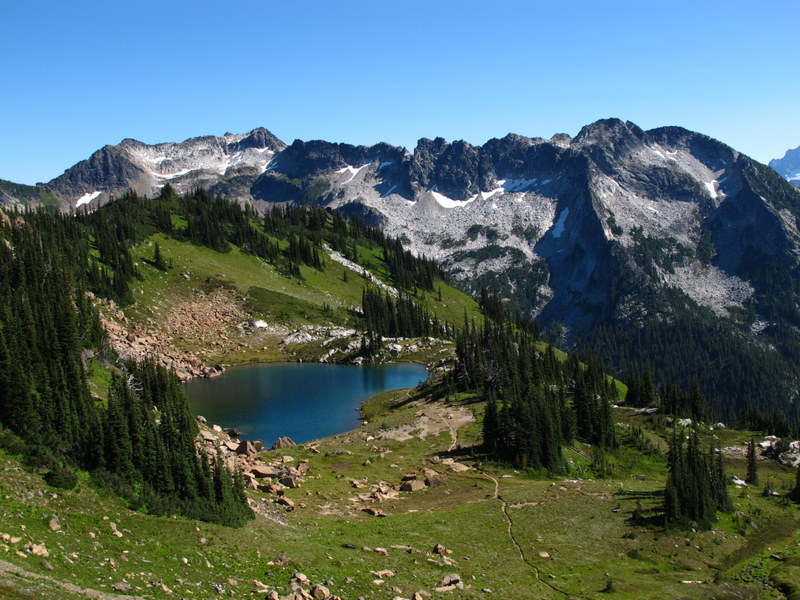
Florence Lake and Grindstone Mountain

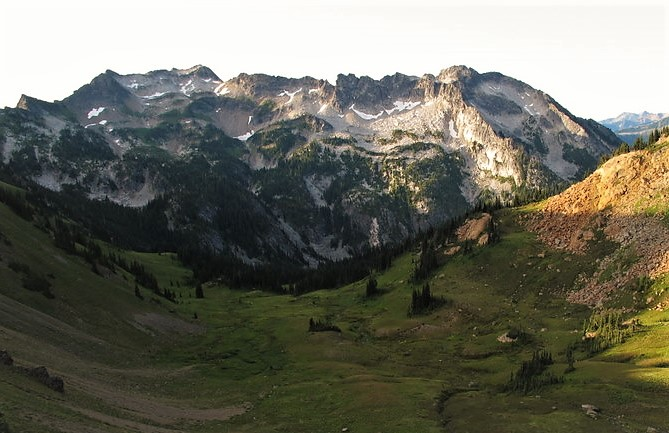
Grindstone Mountain from the north

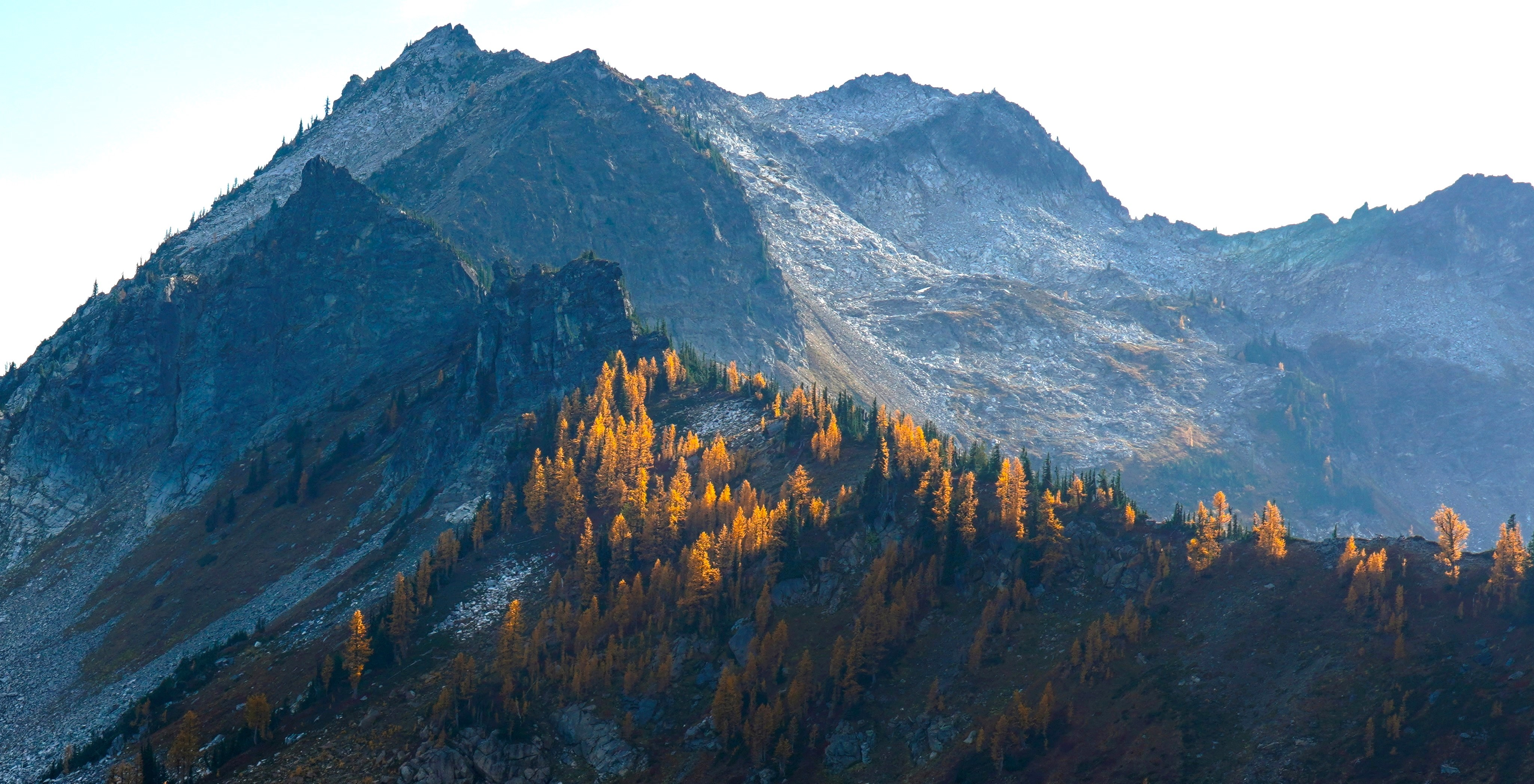
North aspect

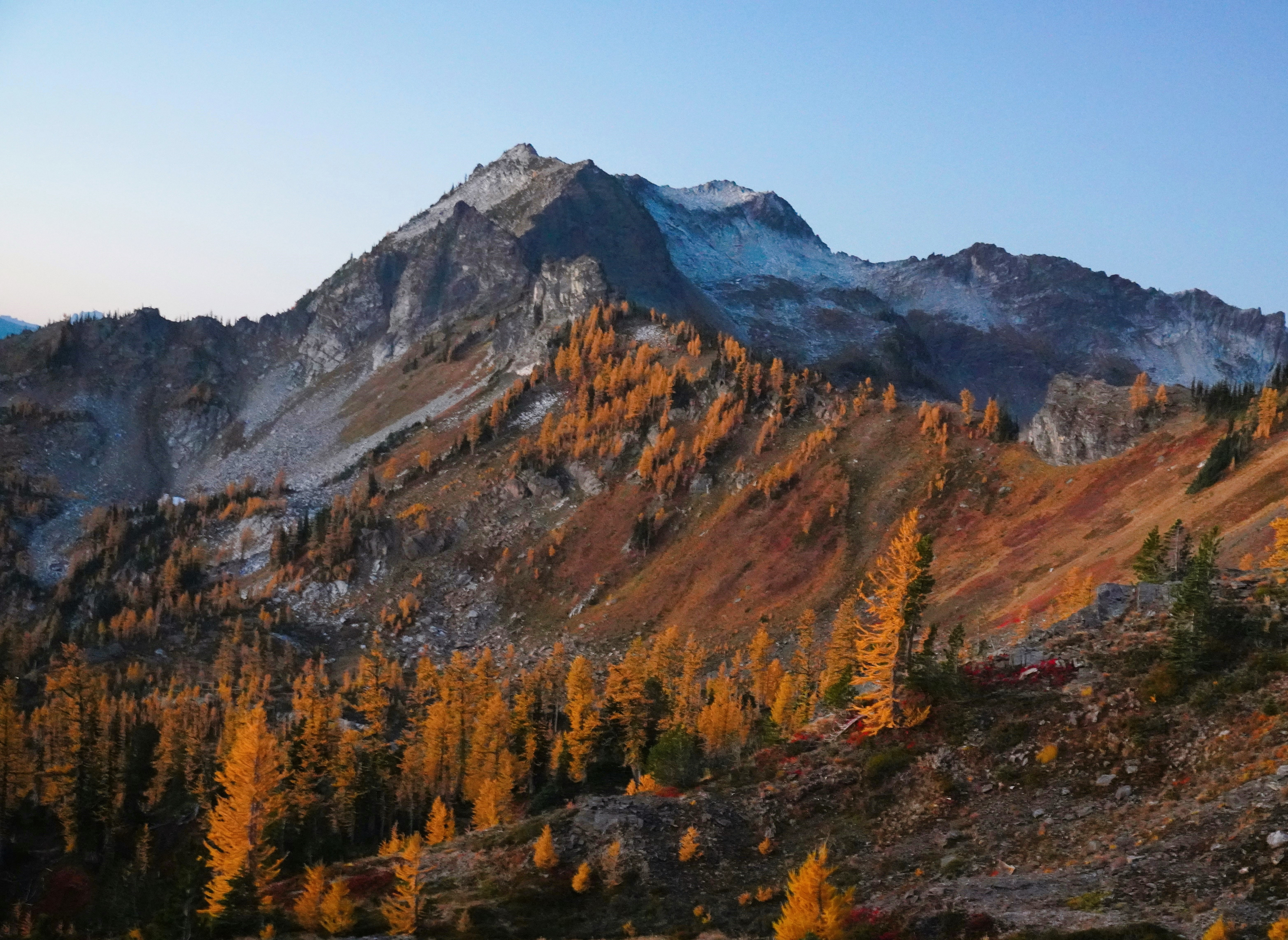
North aspect
