= Big Lou =

Mountain in Washington (state), United States

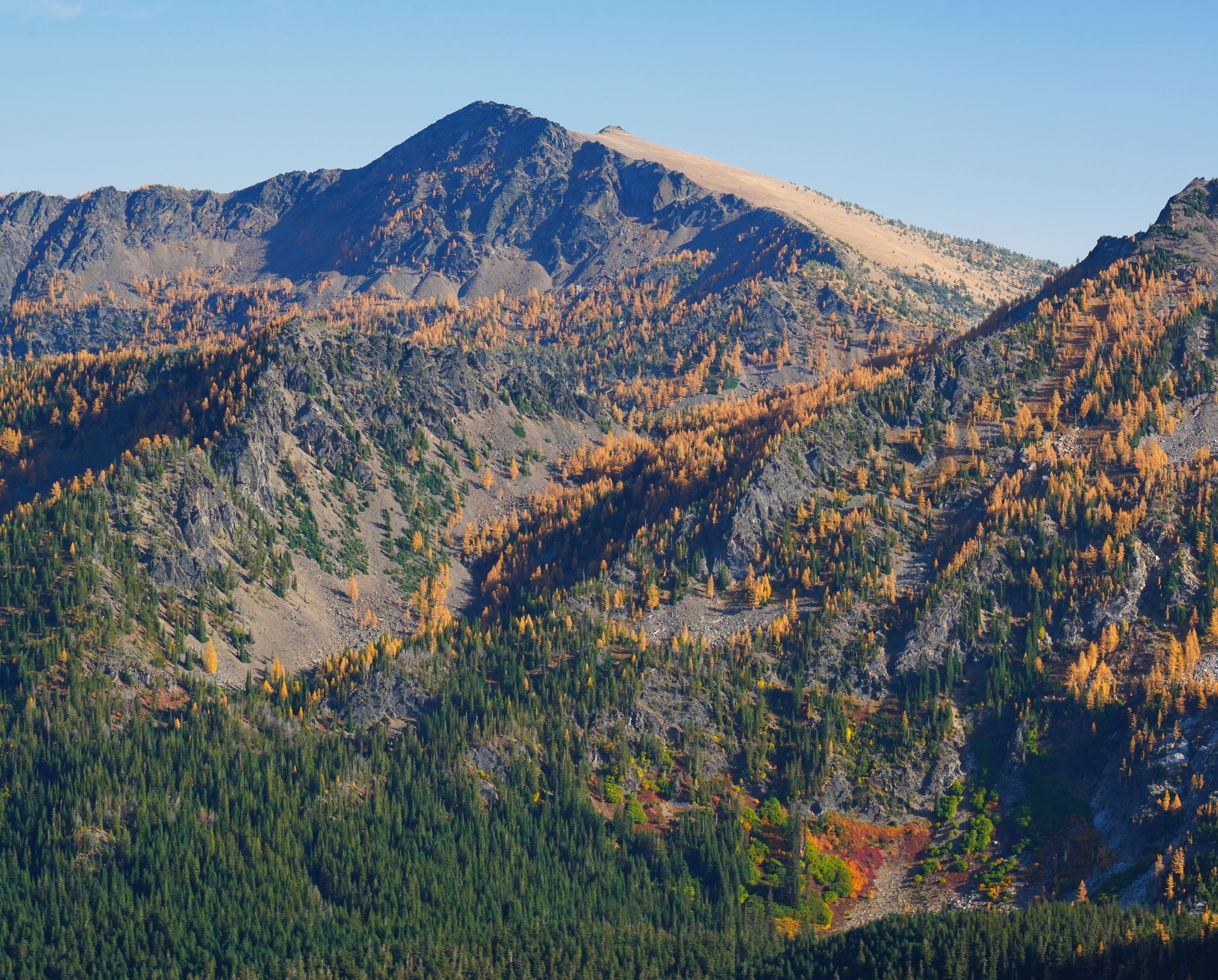
- West-northwest aspect

Highest point
- Elevation: 7,780 ft (2,370 m)
- Prominence: 1,220 ft (370 m)
- Parent peak: Snowgrass Mountain (7,993 ft)
- Isolation: 4.9 mi (7.9 km)
- Coordinates: 47°38′21″N 120°50′51″W

Geography
- Location within Washington (state) Location within the United States
- Country: United States
- State: Washington
- County: Chelan
- Protected area: Alpine Lakes Wilderness
- Parent range: Chiwaukum Mountains; Wenatchee Mountains; Cascade Range
- Topo map: USGS Big Jim Mountain

Climbing
- Easiest route: class 2 hiking West ridge

Big Lou is a 7,780+ ft (2,370+ m) mountain summit located in Chelan County of Washington state. It is situated 8.5 mi (13.7 km) west-northwest of Leavenworth, on the boundary of the Alpine Lakes Wilderness, and on land managed by the Okanogan–Wenatchee National Forest. Big Lou is the highest point on Icicle Ridge, and is the third-highest peak in the Chiwaukum Mountains, a subset of the Cascade Range. Its nearest higher neighbor is Snowgrass Mountain, 5 mi (8.0 km) to the northwest, and slightly lower Big Jim Mountain is set 1.75 mi (2.82 km) to the north-northeast. Precipitation runoff from Big Lou drains into Icicle Creek and other tributaries of the Wenatchee River. Although modest in elevation, relief is significant since Big Lou rises 5,200 feet above Icicle Creek Valley in approximately two miles. Big Lou is named for mountaineer Lou Whittaker, the twin brother of Jim Whittaker, the first American to summit Mount Everest.

== Climate ==
Most weather fronts originate in the Pacific Ocean, and travel east toward the Cascade Mountains. As fronts approach, they are forced upward by the peaks of the Cascade Range, causing them to drop their moisture in the form of rain or snowfall onto the Cascades (Orographic lift). As a result, the Cascades experience high precipitation, especially during the winter months in the form of snowfall. During winter months, weather is usually cloudy, but, due to high pressure systems over the Pacific Ocean that intensify during summer months, there is often little or no cloud cover during the summer. The months June through October offer the most favorable weather for viewing or climbing this peak.

== Geology ==
The Alpine Lakes Wilderness features some of the most rugged topography in the Cascade Range with craggy peaks and ridges, deep glacial valleys, and granite walls spotted with over 700 mountain lakes. Geological events occurring many years ago created the diverse topography and drastic elevation changes over the Cascade Range leading to the various climate differences.

During the Pleistocene period dating back over two million years ago, glaciation advancing and retreating repeatedly scoured the landscape leaving deposits of rock debris. The last glacial retreat in the Alpine Lakes area began about 14,000 years ago and was north of the Canada–US border by 10,000 years ago. The U-shaped cross section of the river valleys is a result of that recent glaciation. Uplift and faulting in combination with glaciation have been the dominant processes which have created the tall peaks and deep valleys of the Alpine Lakes Wilderness area.

== See also ==
- Geology of the Pacific Northwest
- List of peaks of the Alpine Lakes Wilderness

== Gallery ==
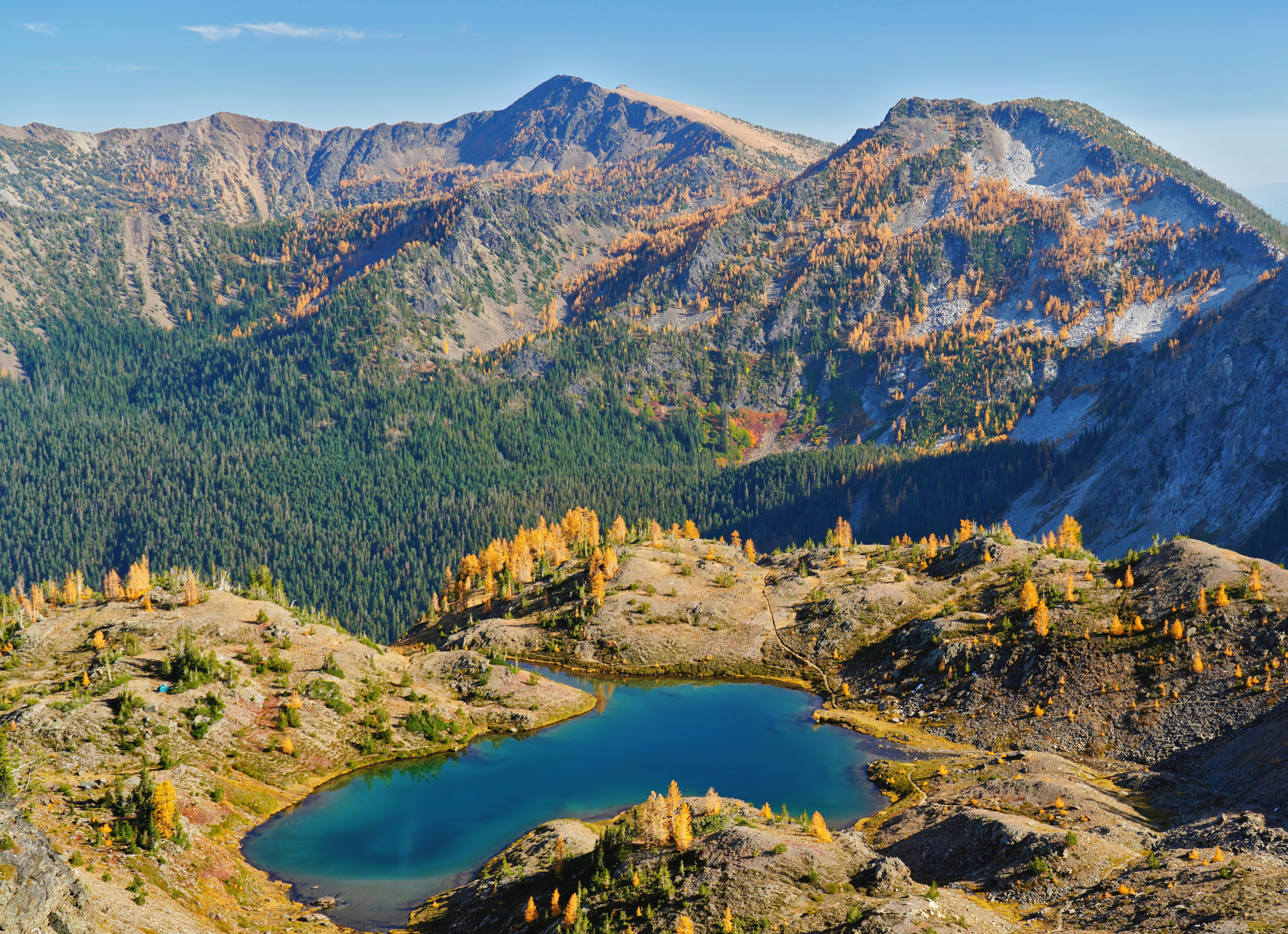
WNW aspect of Big Lou centered at top.
Lake Edna in foreground, Frigid Mountain to the right.

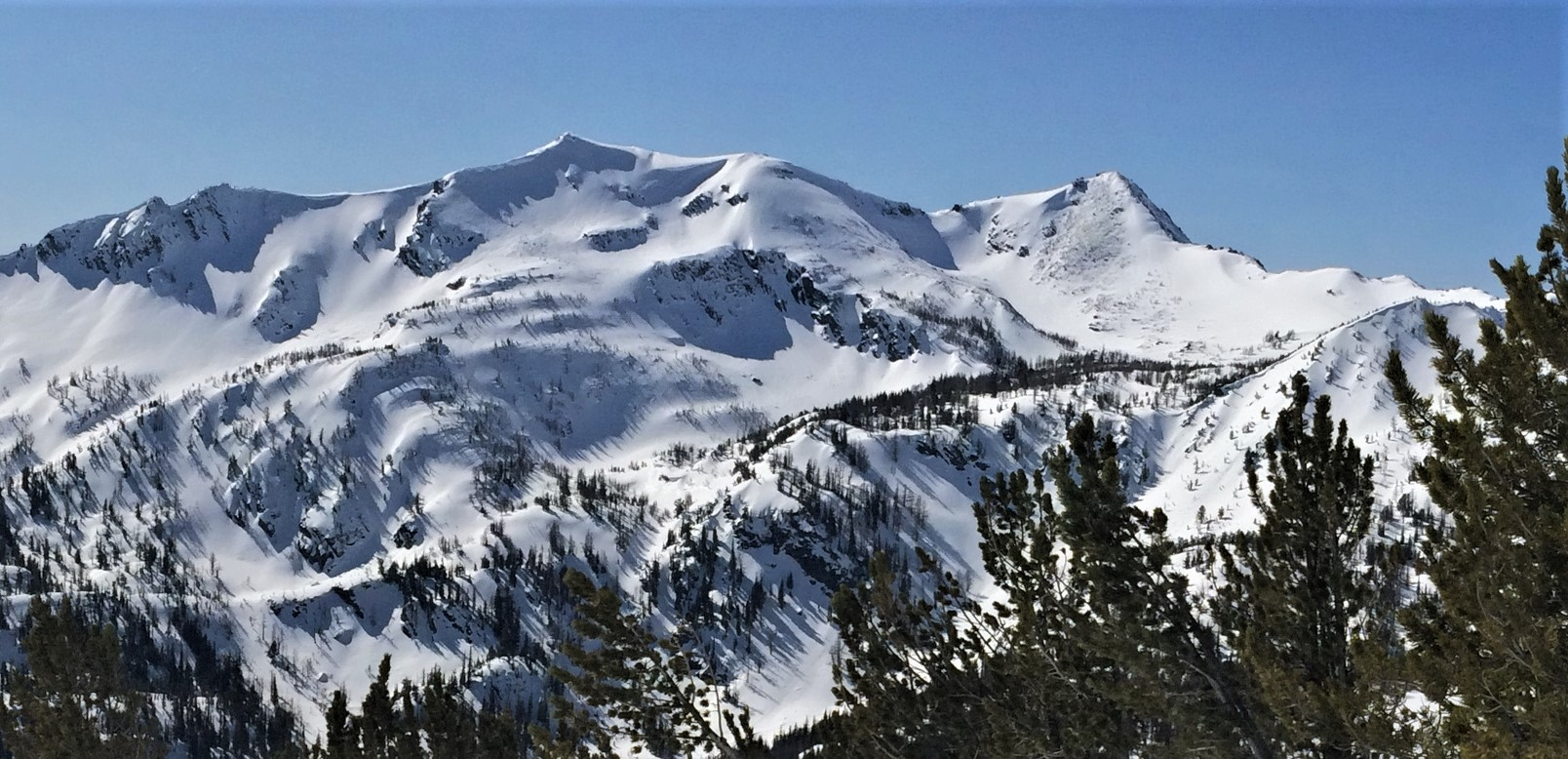
Icicle Ridge / Big Lou from northeast

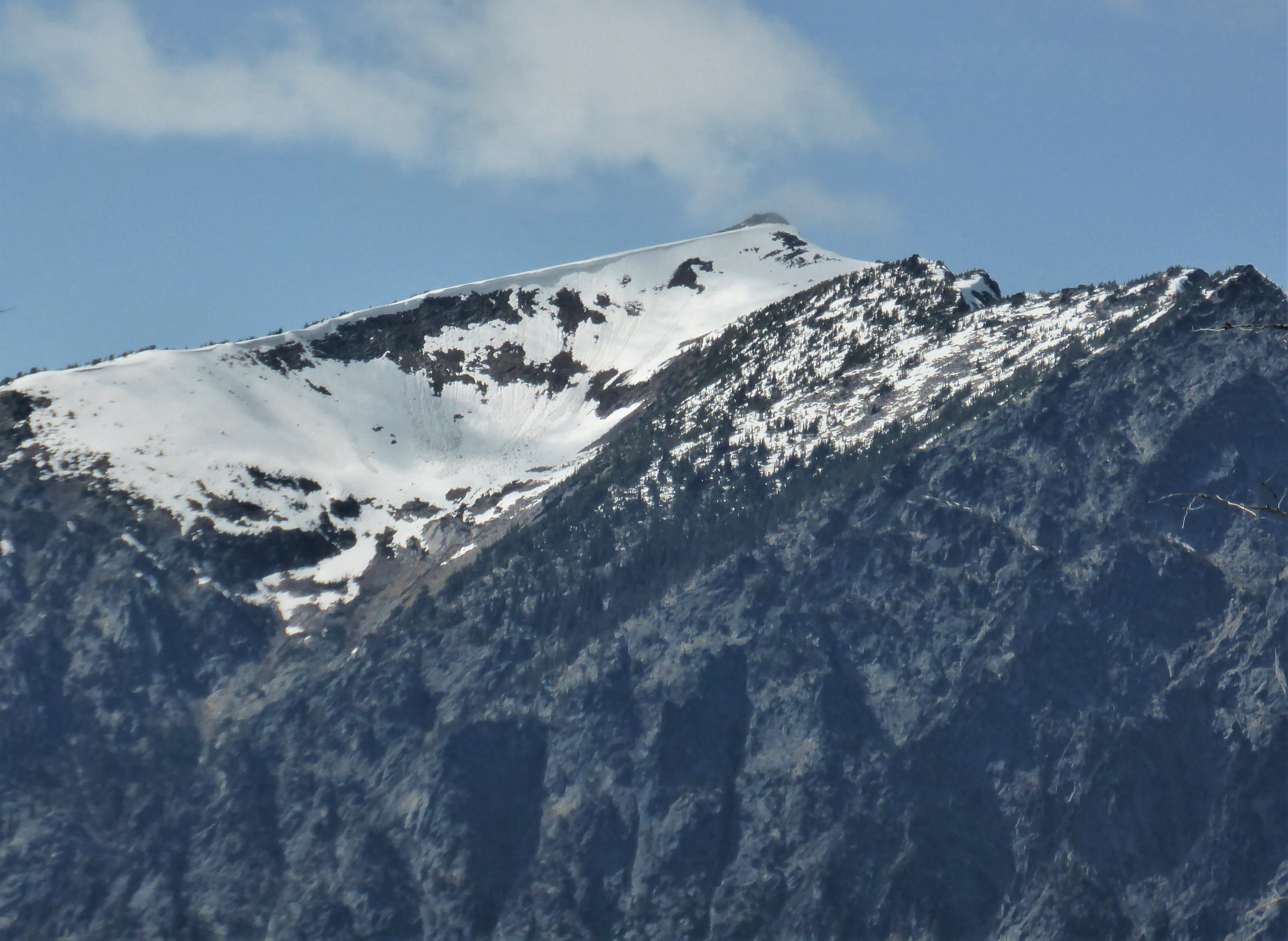
Big Lou's subsidiary 7,763-ft peak, aka "Big Slide"

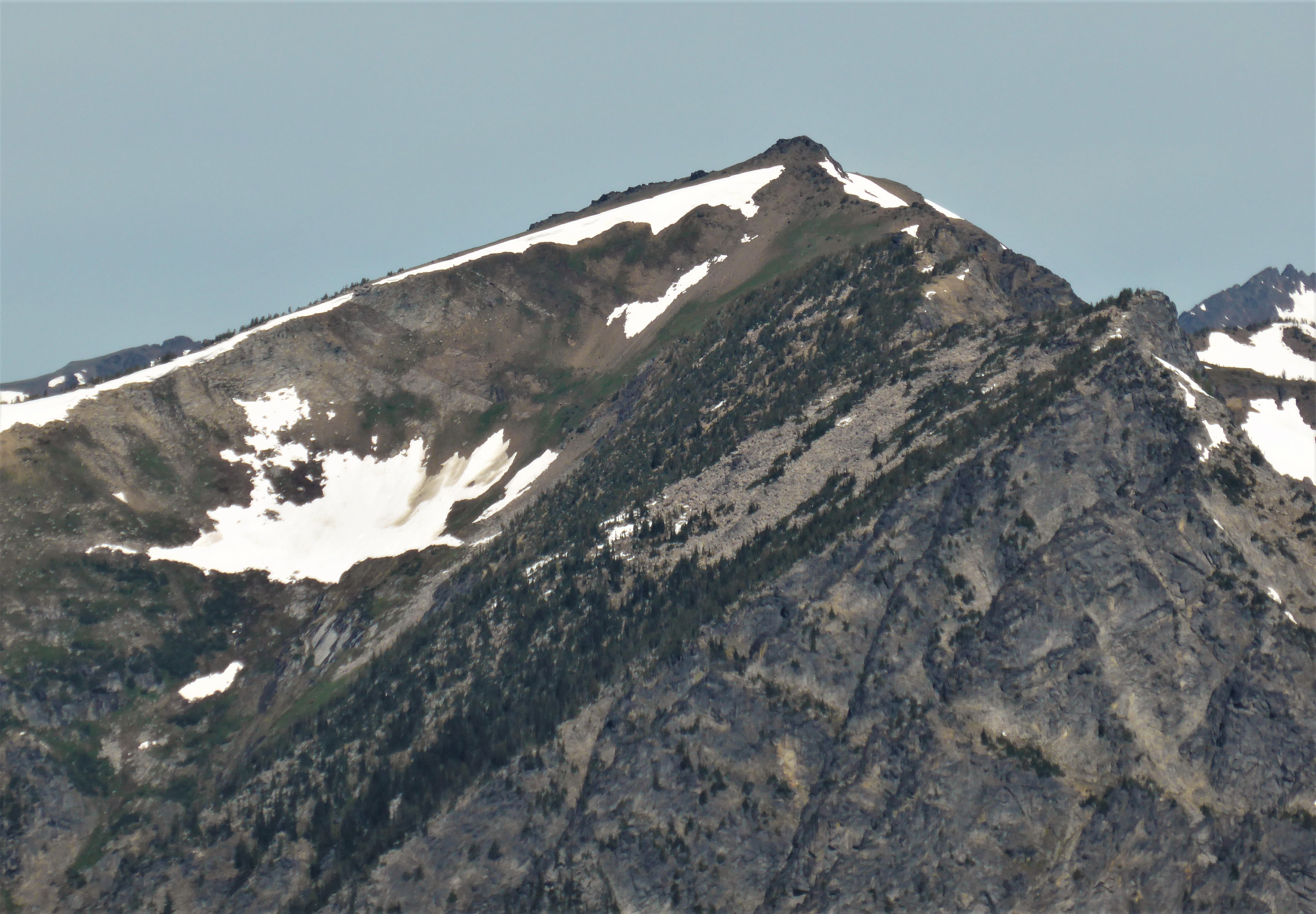
Big Lou from southeast
