= Jim Hill Mountain =

Mountain in Washington

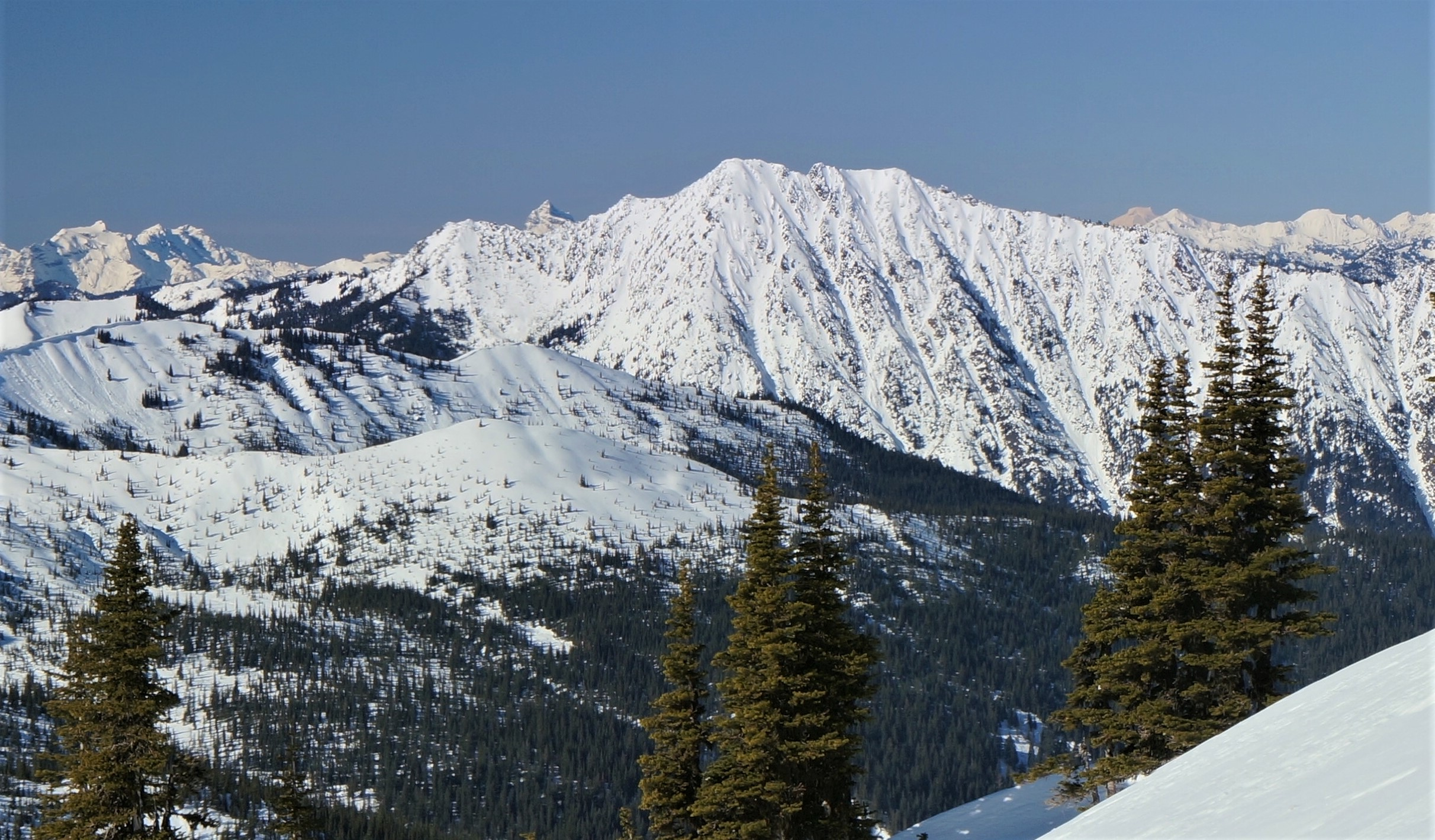
- Jim Hill Mountain, southeast aspect

Highest point
- Elevation: 6,765 ft (2,062 m)
- Prominence: 2,085 ft (636 m)
- Parent peak: Bulls Tooth (6,840 ft)
- Isolation: 3.82 mi (6.15 km)
- Coordinates: 47°44′16″N 121°00′36″W

Naming
- Etymology: James J. Hill

Geography
- Location within Washington (state) Location within the United States
- Country: United States
- State: Washington
- County: Chelan
- Protected area: Alpine Lakes Wilderness
- Parent range: Chiwaukum Mountains; Wenatchee Mountains; Cascade Range
- Topo map: USGS Stevens Pass

Geology
- Rock age: Late Cretaceous
- Rock type: Schist

Climbing
- Easiest route: Scrambling

Jim Hill Mountain is a prominent 6,765 ft (2,060 m) mountain summit located in Chelan County of Washington state. Jim Hill Mountain is situated 3.5 mi (5.6 km) east of Stevens Pass, on the boundary of Alpine Lakes Wilderness, on land managed by the Okanogan–Wenatchee National Forest. Jim Hill Mountain is part of the Chiwaukum Mountains, which are a subset of the Cascade Range. Its nearest higher neighbor is Bulls Tooth, 3.8 mi (6.1 km) to the south. Precipitation runoff from the peak drains into tributaries of Nason Creek, which in turn is a tributary of the Wenatchee River. Jim Hill Mountain is set immediately south of the east portal of the Cascade Tunnel, which was built by the Great Northern Railway. This mountain was named by Albert Hale Sylvester to honor James J. Hill (1838–1916), the chief executive officer of the Great Northern Railway. Hill became known during his lifetime as "The Empire Builder", a name bestowed to the Empire Builder passenger train that runs from Seattle to Chicago, and traverses below this mountain.

== Climate ==
Jim Hill Mountain is located in the marine west coast climate zone of western North America. Most weather fronts originate in the Pacific Ocean, and travel northeast toward the Cascade Mountains. As fronts approach, they are forced upward by the peaks of the Cascade Range, causing them to drop their moisture in the form of rain or snowfall onto the Cascades (Orographic lift). As a result, the west side of the Cascades experiences high precipitation, especially during the winter months in the form of snowfall. Because of maritime influence, snow tends to be wet and heavy, resulting in avalanche danger. The deadliest avalanche in the history of the United States, the 1910 Wellington avalanche, occurred approximately seven miles (11 km) west-southwest of Jim Hill Mountain. During winter months, weather is usually cloudy, but due to high-pressure systems over the Pacific Ocean that intensify during summer months, there is often little or no cloud cover during the summer.

== Geology ==
The Alpine Lakes Wilderness features some of the most rugged topography in the Cascade Range with craggy peaks and ridges, deep glacial valleys, and granite walls spotted with over 700 mountain lakes. Geological events occurring many years ago created the diverse topography and drastic elevation changes over the Cascade Range leading to the various climate differences. Glacier Peak, a stratovolcano that is 26.3 mi (42.3 km) north of Jim Hill Mountain, began forming in the mid-Pleistocene.

During the Pleistocene period dating back over two million years ago, glaciation advancing and retreating repeatedly scoured the landscape leaving deposits of rock debris. The last glacial retreat in the Alpine Lakes area began about 14,000 years ago and was north of the Canada–US border by 10,000 years ago. The U-shaped cross section of the river valleys is a result of that recent glaciation. Uplift and faulting in combination with glaciation have been the dominant processes that have created the tall peaks and deep valleys of the Alpine Lakes Wilderness area.

== See also ==
- List of peaks of the Alpine Lakes Wilderness
- Arrowhead Mountain

== Gallery ==
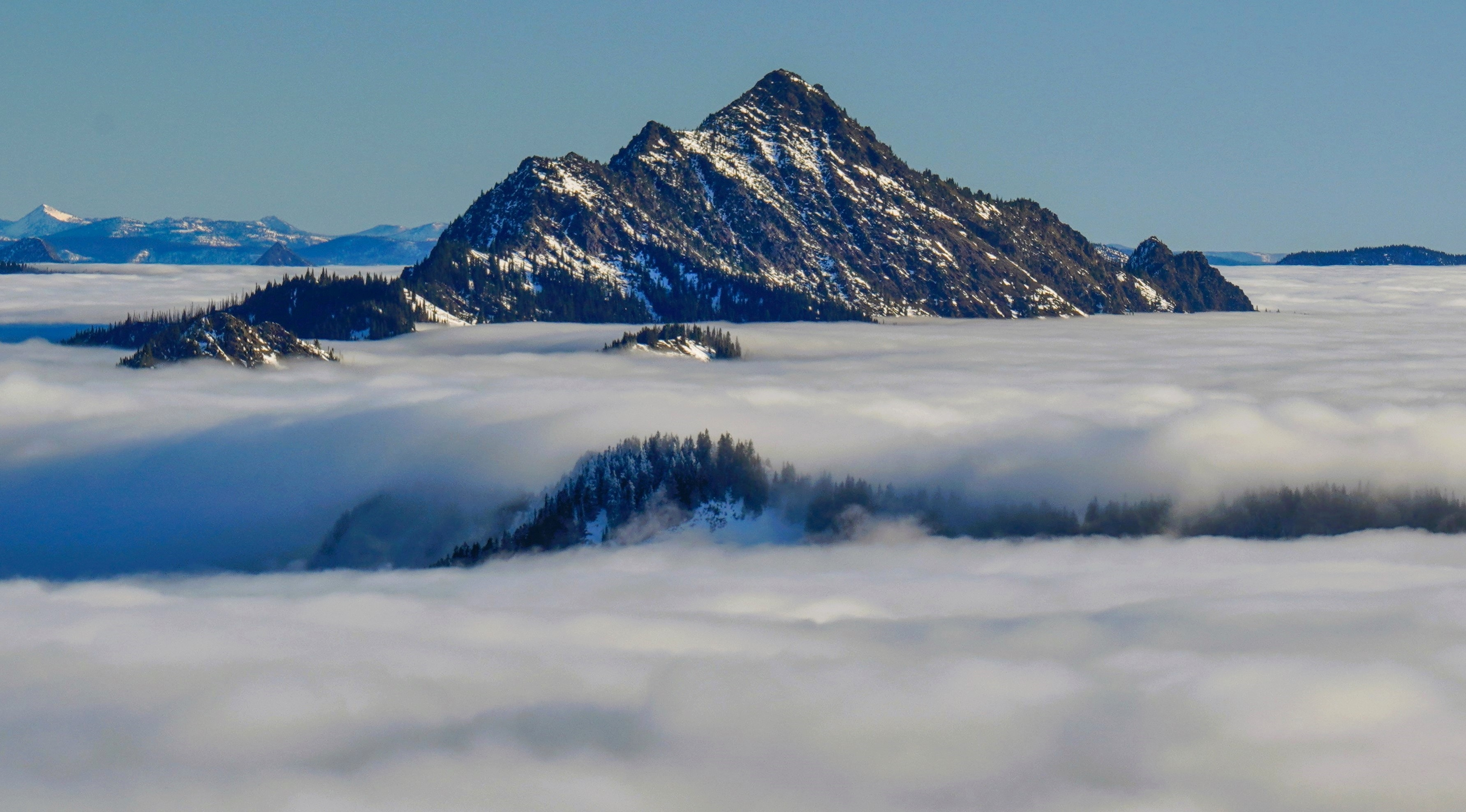
Southwest aspect

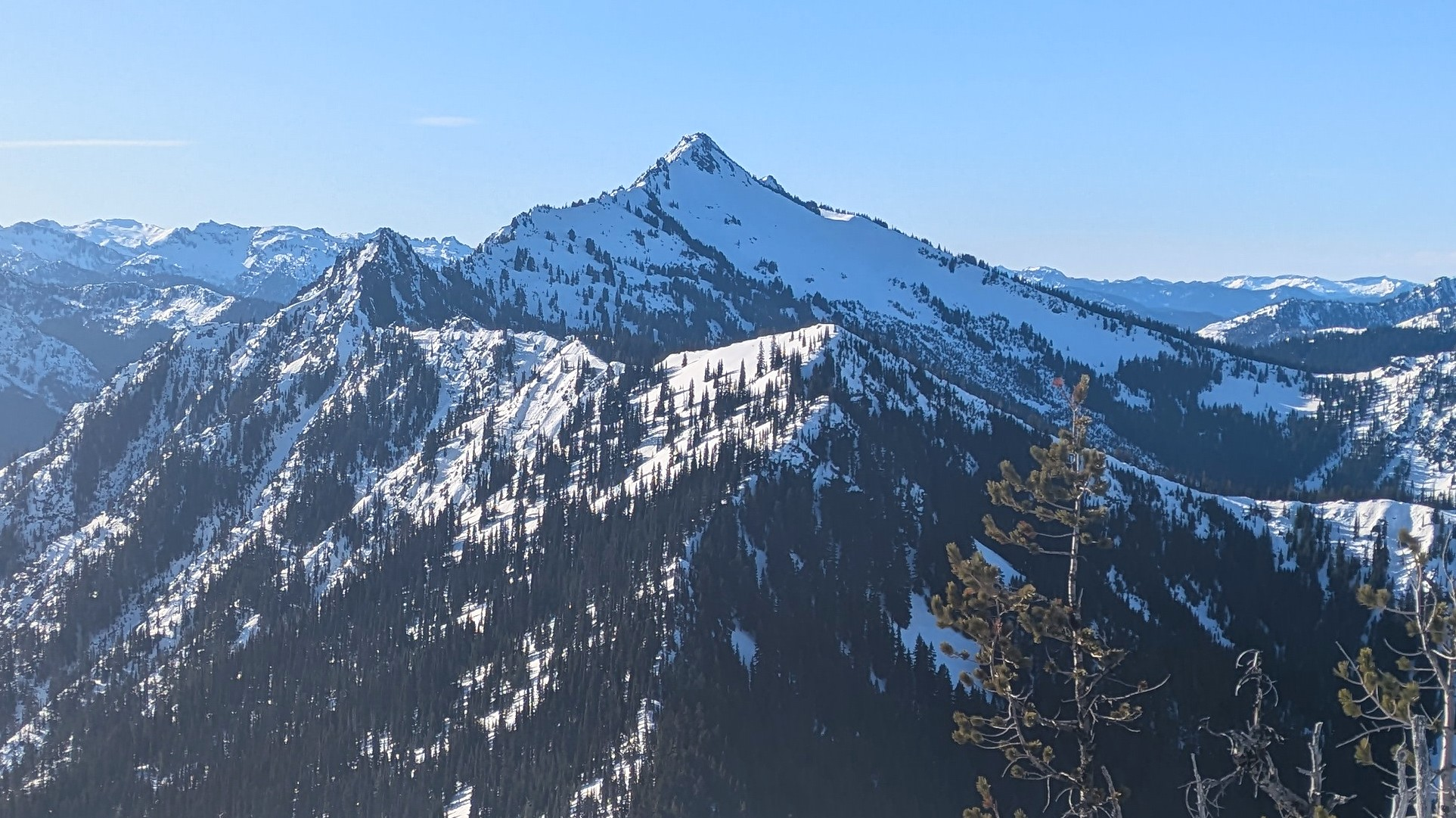
Northeast aspect viewed from Arrowhead Mountain

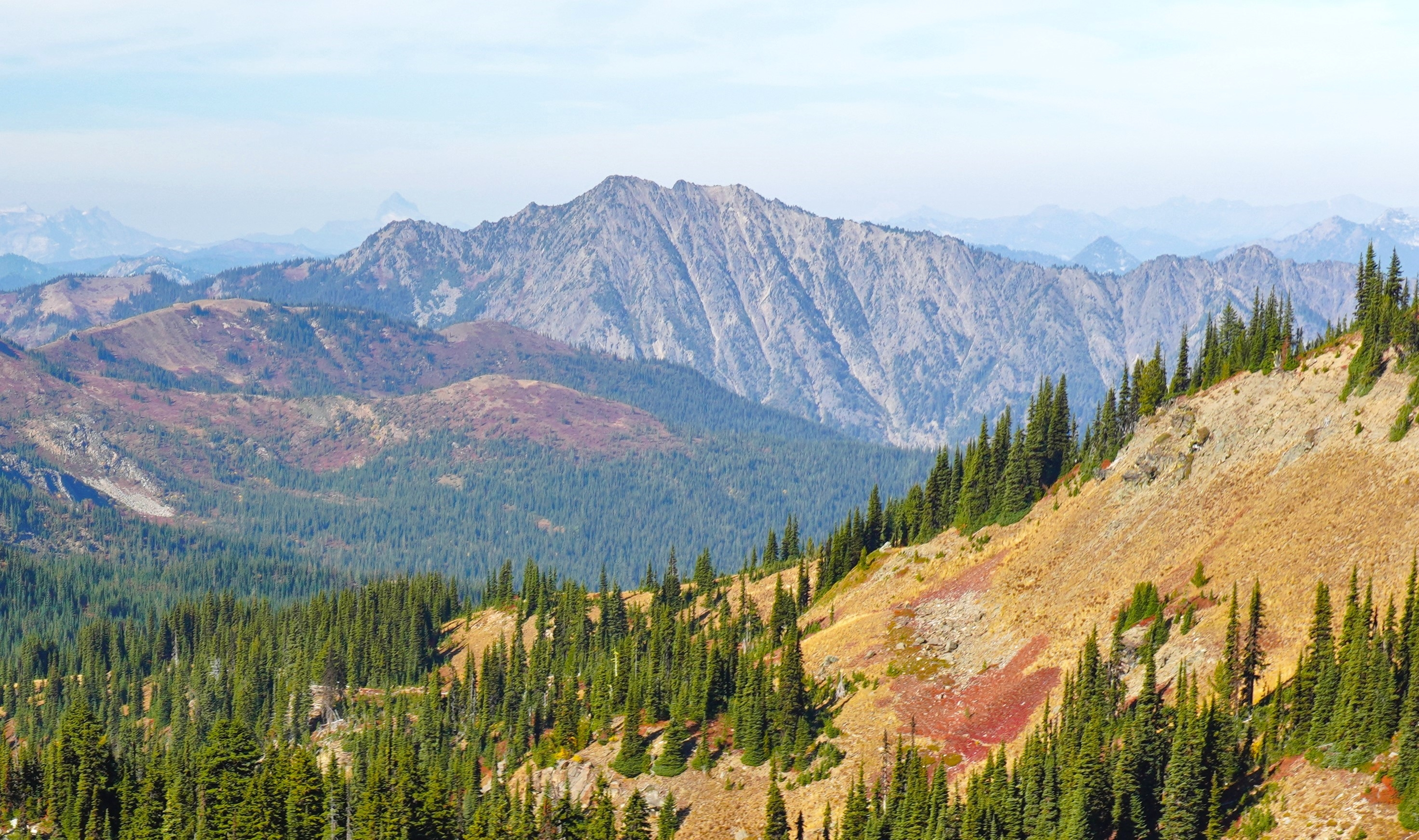
Southeast aspect

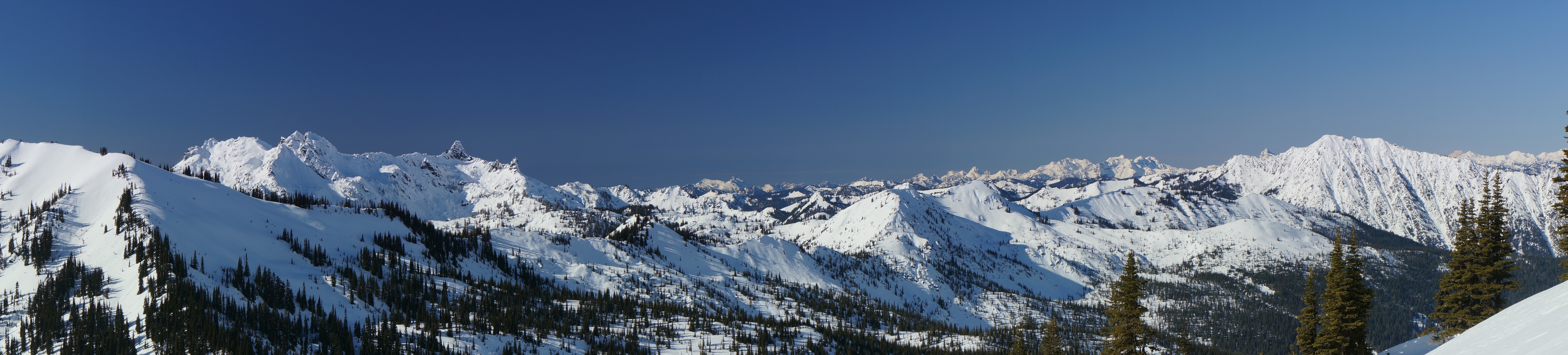
Jim Hill Mountain (right) with parent Bulls Tooth (left)
