= Chiwaukum Lake =

Lake in Washington state, U.S.

Chikamin Lake
- Location within Washington (state) Location within the United States
- Location: Chelan County, Washington
- Coordinates: 47.7251°N 120.88706°W
- Primary outflows: Chiwaukum Creek
- Basin countries: United States
- Surface area: 58 acres (23 ha)
- Average depth: 72 feet (22 m)
- Max. depth: 128 feet (39 m)
- Water volume: 5.06 cubic hectometres (179,000,000 cu ft)
- Shore length^{1}: 1.6 miles (2.6 km)
- Surface elevation: 5,213 feet (1,589 m)
- ^{1} Shore length is not a well-defined measure.

Chiwaukum Lake is an alpine freshwater lake located on the Ewing Basin south of Lake Donald and the McCue Ridge in King County, Washington. Because of its proximity to surrounding peaks and mountains at the heart of the Alpine Lakes Wilderness, the lake is a popular area for hiking. Outflow from Chiwaukum Lake is Chiwaukum Creek and an unnamed creek flows into Chiwaukim Lake from Larch Lake. A short distance north of Donald Lake are other Scottish Lakes including Loch Eileen and Lake Julius.

== See also ==
- List of lakes of the Alpine Lakes Wilderness
- Chiwaukum Mountains
