= Chiwaukum Mountains =

Mountain range in Washington, United States

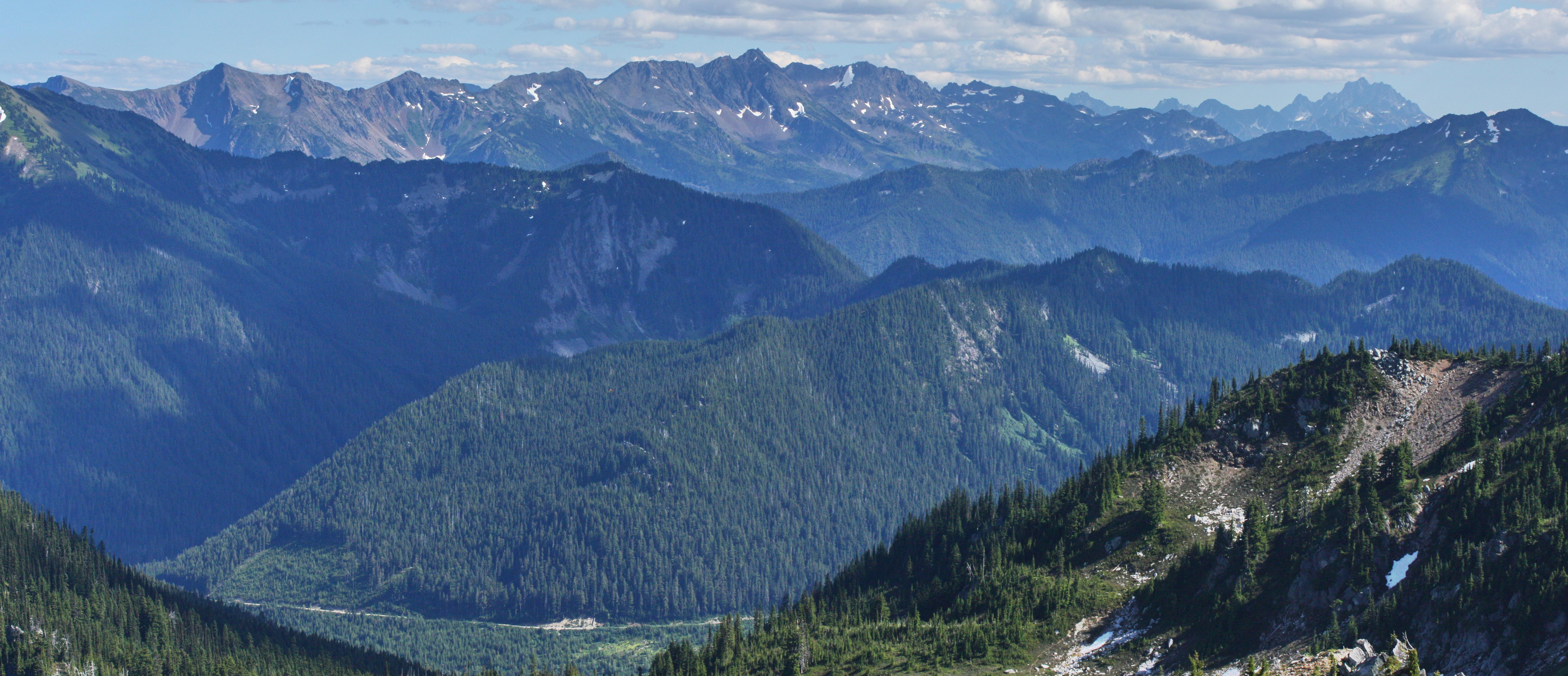
- The Chiwaukum Mountains (left and center skyline), looking south southeast, with Big Chiwaukum (8081 feet, 2463 m), the highest point

Highest point
- Peak: Big Chiwaukum
- Elevation: 2,463 m (8,081 ft)
- Coordinates: 47°42′05″N 120°56′02″W

Geography
- Country: United States
- State: Washington
- District: Wenatchee National Forest
- Parent range: Wenatchee Mountains

Geology
- Rock age: Cretaceous
- Rock type: schist

The Chiwaukum Mountains are a north–south mountain range in central Washington, United States. They stretch from Snowgrass Mountain at 47°41′N 120°56′W, to 47°45′N 120°54′W.

The mountains are made of schist, part of the Nason terrane. The original rock in the Nason terrane was laid down 210 Myr ago. The terrane then smashed into the western coastline of the continent, and the Mount Stuart batholith intruded into it in the late Cretaceous. The intrusion of the granitic rock metamorphosed the rock into schist.

In July 2014, the lightning-caused Chiwaukum Creek Fire burned the east flank of the Chiwaukum Mountains.

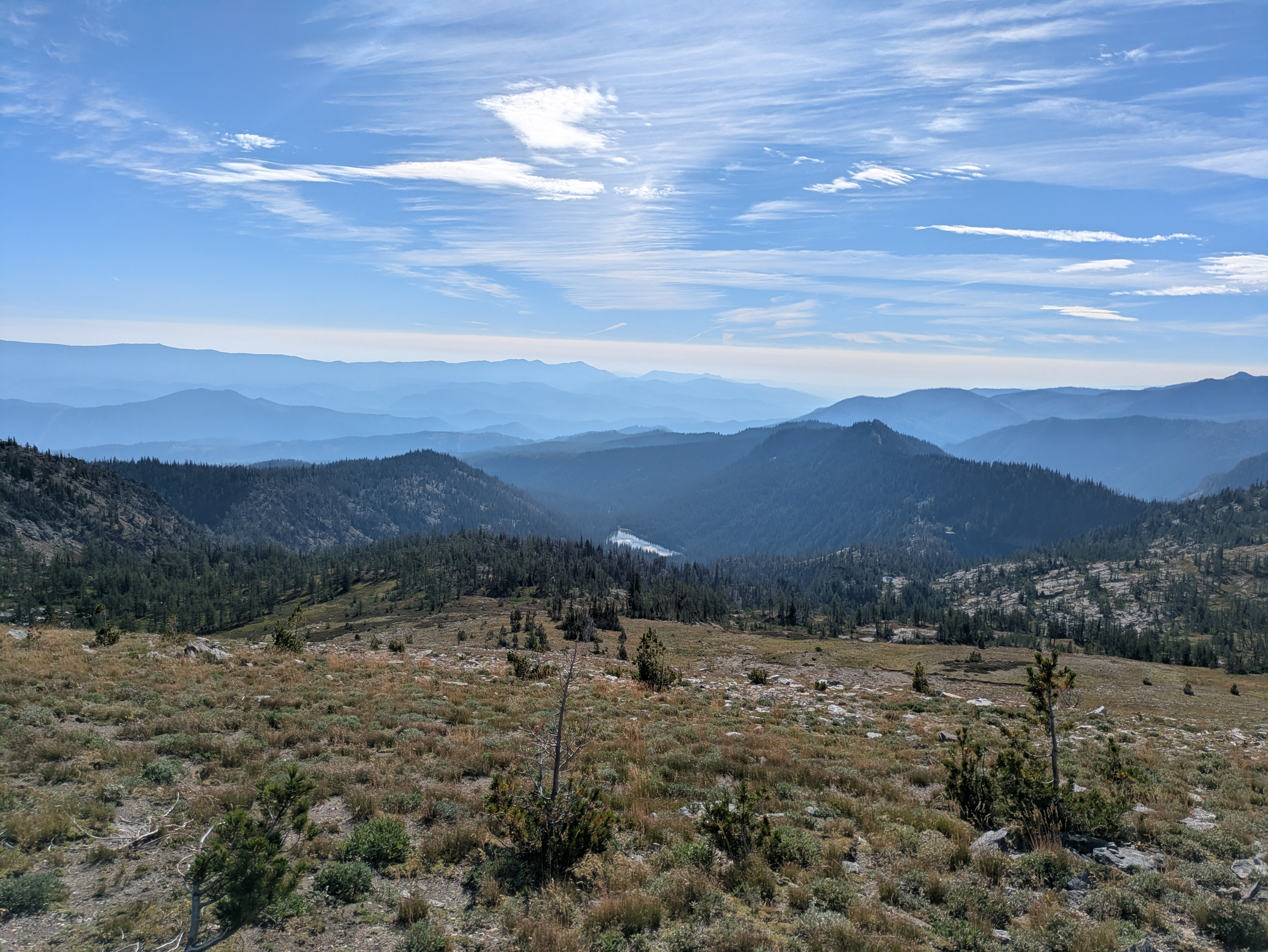
Above treeline in the meadows below North Chiwaukum, looking east

Partial list of peaks:

- Big Chiwaukum – 8,081' (2463m) –
- Snowgrass Mountain – 7,993' (2436m) –
- Big Lou – 7,780' (2370m) –
- Big Jim Mountain – 7,765' (2367m) –
- Ladies Peak – 7,708' (2349m) –
- Grindstone Mountain – 7,533' (2296m) –
- Cape Horn – 7,316' (2230m) –
- Bulls Tooth – 6,840' (2080m) –

Nearby peaks:

- Jim Hill Mountain – 6,765' (2062m) –
- Arrowhead Mountain – 6,020' (1835m) –
- Cowboy Mountain – 5,853' (1784m) –

== See also ==
- Chiwaukum Lake
- List of mountain ranges in Washington
- List of lakes of the Alpine Lakes Wilderness
