= Bulls Tooth =

Mountain in Washington (state), United States

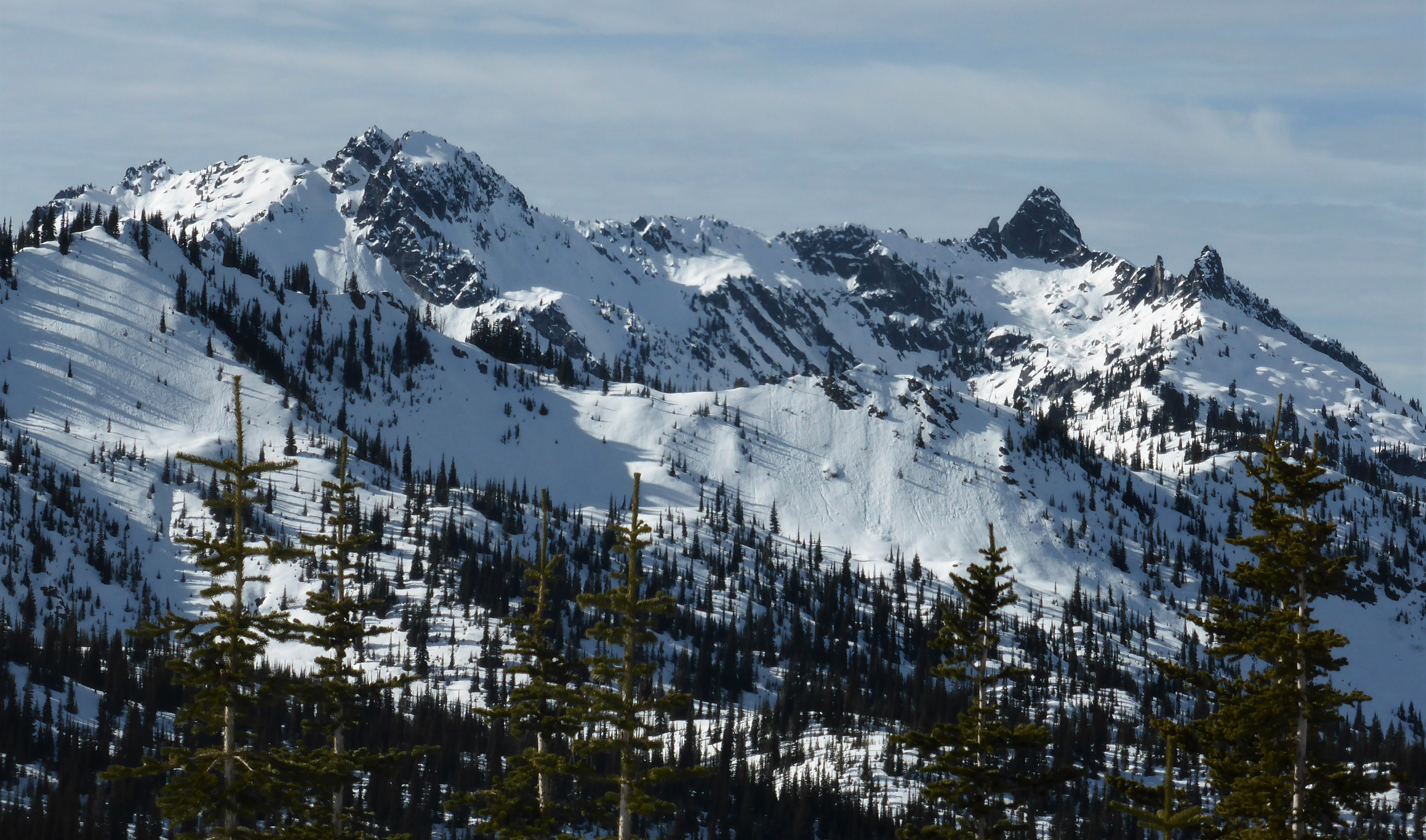
- Bulls Tooth, east aspect

Highest point
- Elevation: 6,840 ft (2,080 m)
- Prominence: 1,280 ft (390 m)
- Parent peak: Snowgrass Mountain (7,999 ft)
- Isolation: 3.29 mi (5.29 km)
- Coordinates: 47°40′57″N 121°00′14″W

Geography
- Location within Washington (state) Location within the United States
- Country: United States
- State: Washington
- County: Chelan
- Protected area: Alpine Lakes Wilderness
- Parent range: Chiwaukum Mountains; Wenatchee Mountains; Cascade Range
- Topo map: USGS Stevens Pass

Geology
- Rock age: Late Cretaceous
- Rock type: Tonalitic plutons

Climbing
- Easiest route: Scrambling

Bulls Tooth is a 6,840+ ft (2,080+ m) multi-peak mountain located in Chelan County of Washington state. Bulls Tooth is situated 5.5 mi (8.9 km) southeast of Stevens Pass, and within the Alpine Lakes Wilderness, on land managed by the Okanogan–Wenatchee National Forest. Bulls Tooth is part of the Chiwaukum Mountains, which are a subset of the Cascade Range. Its nearest higher neighbor is Snowgrass Mountain, 3.3 mi (5.3 km) to the east. Precipitation runoff from the peak drains into tributaries of Icicle Creek, which in turn is a tributary of the Wenatchee River. This mountain was named by Albert Hale Sylvester for its resemblance to a tooth.

== Climate ==
Weather fronts originating in the Pacific Ocean travel east toward the Cascade Mountains. As fronts approach, they are forced upward by the peaks (orographic lift), causing them to drop their moisture in the form of rain or snowfall onto the Cascades. As a result, the Cascades experience high precipitation, especially during the winter months in the form of snowfall. During winter months, weather is usually cloudy, but, due to high pressure systems over the Pacific Ocean that intensify during summer months, there is often little or no cloud cover during the summer.

== Geology ==
The Alpine Lakes Wilderness features some of the most rugged topography in the Cascade Range with craggy peaks and ridges, deep glacial valleys, and granite walls spotted with over 700 mountain lakes. Geological events occurring many years ago created the diverse topography and drastic elevation changes over the Cascade Range leading to the various climate differences. Glacier Peak, a stratovolcano that is 30 mi (48 km) north of Bulls Tooth, began forming in the mid-Pleistocene.

During the Pleistocene period dating back over two million years ago, glaciation advancing and retreating repeatedly scoured the landscape leaving deposits of rock debris. The last glacial retreat in the Alpine Lakes area began about 14,000 years ago and was north of the Canada–US border by 10,000 years ago. The U-shaped cross section of the river valleys is a result of that recent glaciation. Uplift and faulting in combination with glaciation have been the dominant processes which have created the tall peaks and deep valleys of the Alpine Lakes Wilderness area.

== See also ==
- List of peaks of the Alpine Lakes Wilderness

== Gallery ==
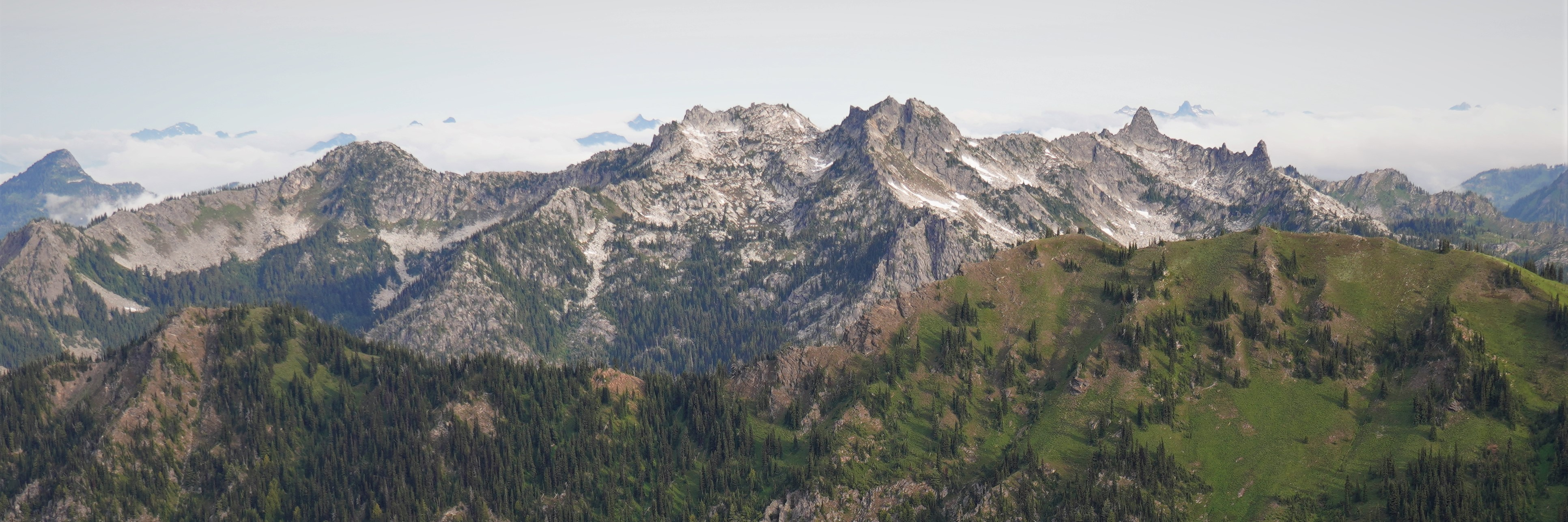

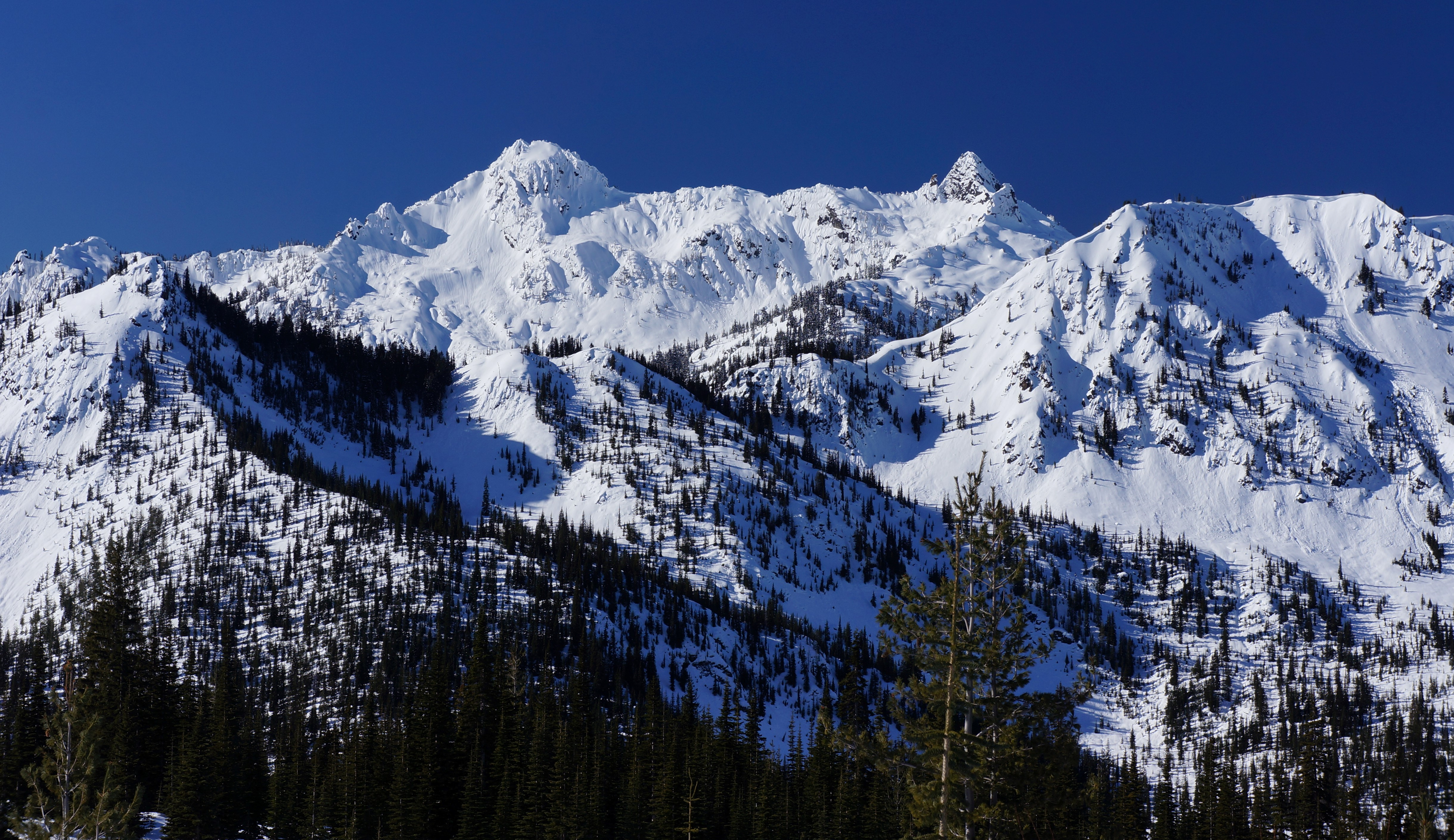

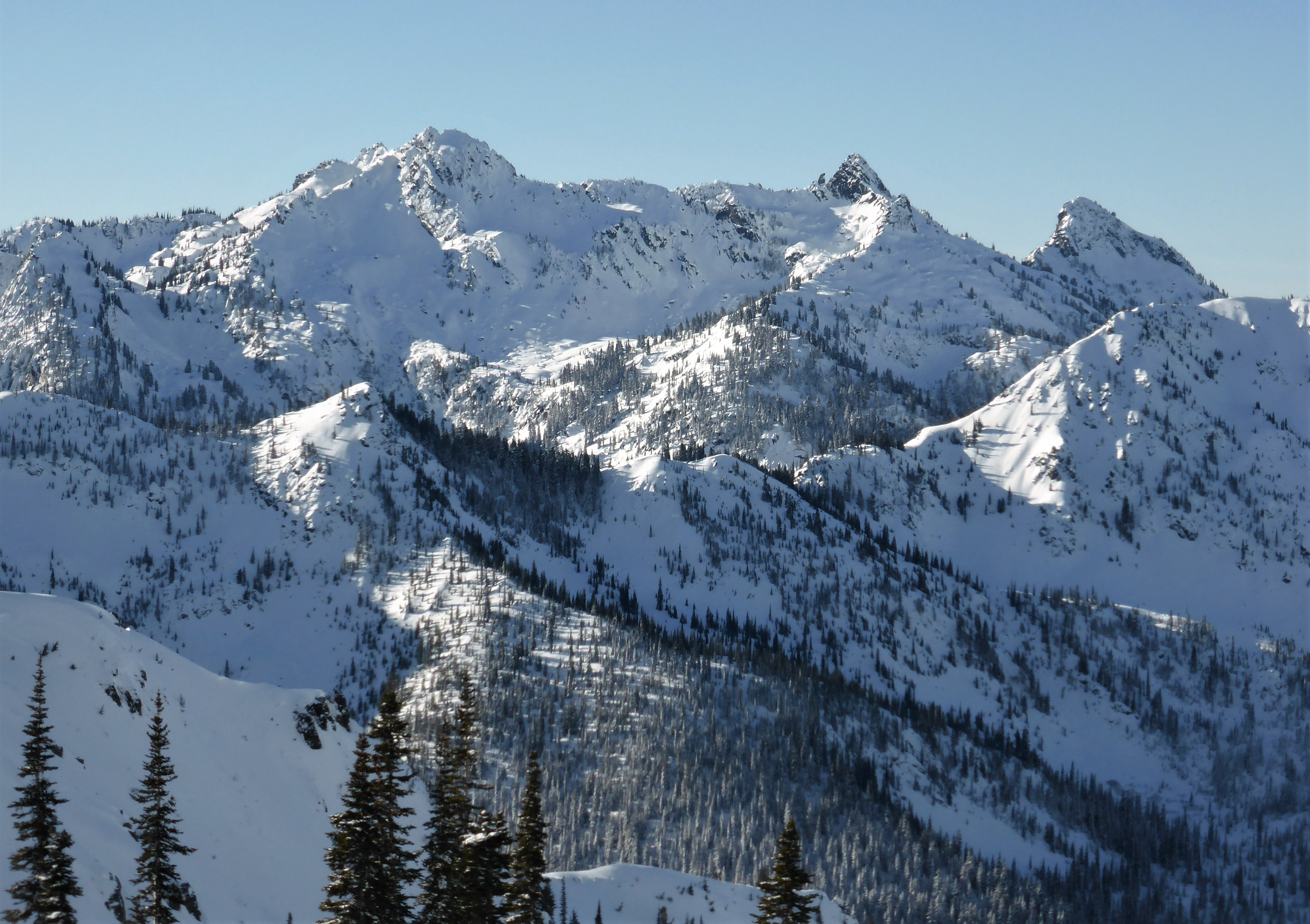

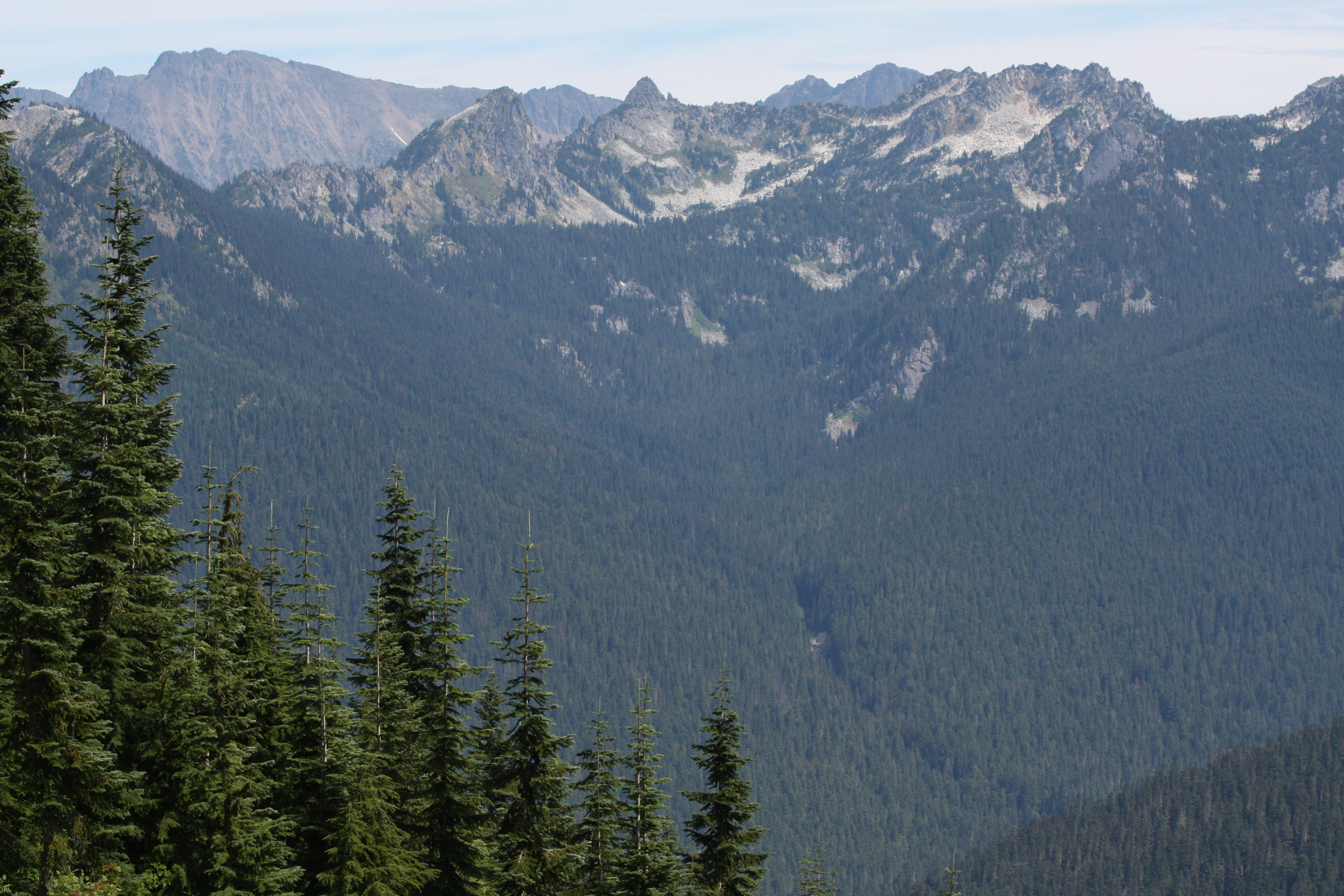

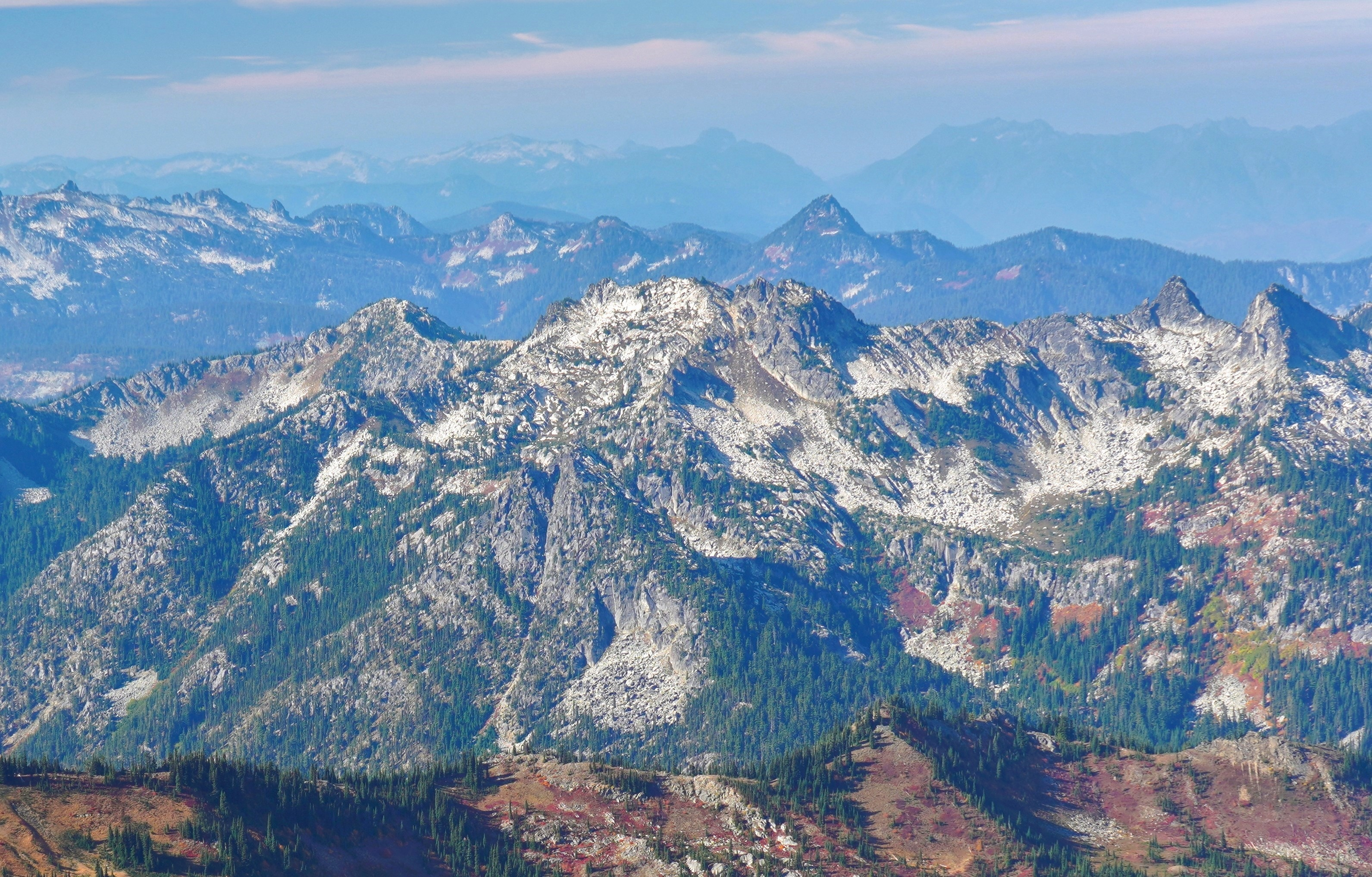
East aspect (centered) seen from Snowgrass Mountain
