= Ladies Peak =

Mountain in Washington (state), United States

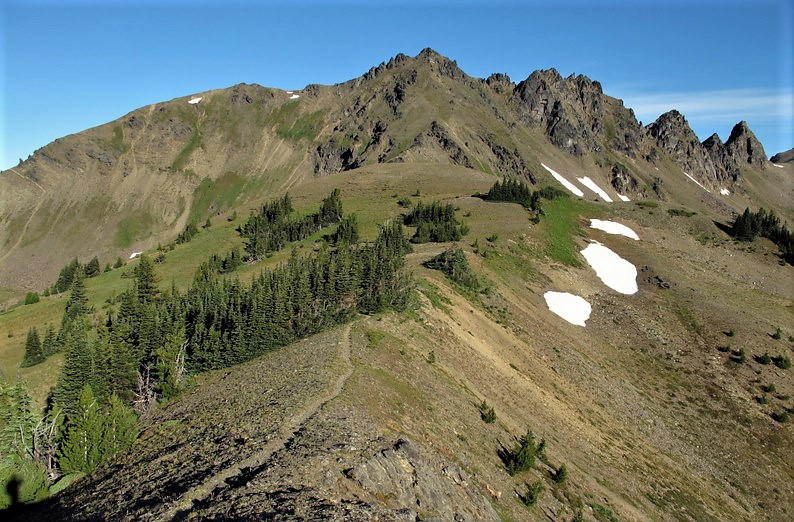
- Sourheast aspect, from Ladies Pass

Highest point
- Elevation: 7,708 ft (2,349 m)
- Prominence: 428 ft (130 m)
- Parent peak: Snowgrass Mountain (7,993 ft)
- Isolation: 1.27 mi (2.04 km)
- Coordinates: 47°39′56″N 120°55′59″W

Geography
- Location within Washington (state) Location within the United States
- Location: Chelan County; Washington state, U.S.
- Parent range: Chiwaukum Mountains; Wenatchee Mountains; Cascade Range
- Topo map: USGS Chiwaukum Mountains

Climbing
- Easiest route: Icicle Ridge Trail (#1570) + hiking the Southeast Ridge from Ladies Pass

Ladies Peak is a 7,708-foot (2,349-metre) mountain summit located in Chelan County of Washington state. Ladies Peak is situated 13 mi (21 km) west-northwest of Leavenworth, within the Alpine Lakes Wilderness, on land managed by the Okanogan–Wenatchee National Forest. Ladies Peak is part of the Chiwaukum Mountains, a subset of the Cascade Range. Its nearest higher neighbor is Snowgrass Mountain, 1.27 mi (2.04 km) to the north, and Cape Horn is set 0.9 mi (1.4 km) to the southeast. Precipitation runoff from Ladies Peak drains west to Icicle Creek, whereas the east slopes drain into Chiwaukum Creek, and both are tributaries of the Wenatchee River. Although modest in elevation, relief is significant since this peak rises over 4,700 feet above Icicle Creek Valley in approximately two miles. This unofficially named peak is named in association with the nearby officially named Ladies Pass, which like many geographical features in this region was named by Albert Hale Sylvester.

== Climate ==
Most weather fronts originate in the Pacific Ocean, and travel east toward the Cascade Mountains. As fronts approach, they are forced upward by the peaks of the Cascade Range, causing them to drop their moisture in the form of rain or snowfall onto the Cascades (Orographic lift). As a result, the Cascades experience high precipitation, especially during the winter months in the form of snowfall. During winter months, weather is usually cloudy, but, due to high pressure systems over the Pacific Ocean that intensify during summer months, there is often little or no cloud cover during the summer. The months June through October offer the most favorable weather for viewing or climbing this peak.

== Geology ==
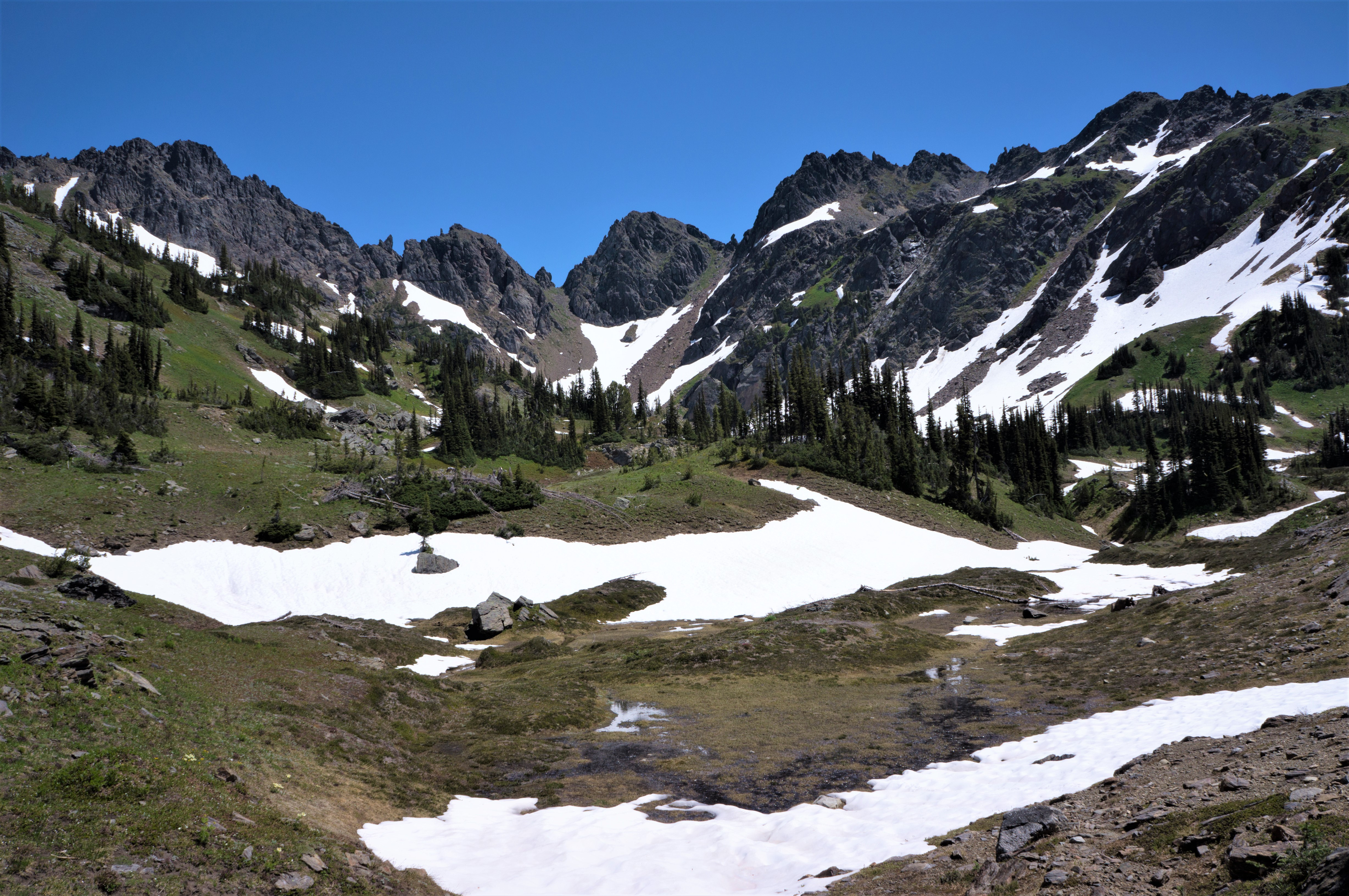
Ladies Peak upper right corner, from northwest

The Alpine Lakes Wilderness features some of the most rugged topography in the Cascade Range with craggy peaks and ridges, deep glacial valleys, and granite walls spotted with over 700 mountain lakes. Geological events occurring many years ago created the diverse topography and drastic elevation changes over the Cascade Range leading to the various climate differences.

During the Pleistocene period dating back over two million years ago, glaciation advancing and retreating repeatedly scoured the landscape leaving deposits of rock debris. The last glacial retreat in the Alpine Lakes area began about 14,000 years ago and was north of the Canada–US border by 10,000 years ago. The U-shaped cross section of the river valleys is a result of that recent glaciation. Uplift and faulting in combination with glaciation have been the dominant processes which have created the tall peaks and deep valleys of the Alpine Lakes Wilderness area.

== See also ==
- List of peaks of the Alpine Lakes Wilderness
