= Cape Horn (Washington) =

Mountain in Washington (state), United States

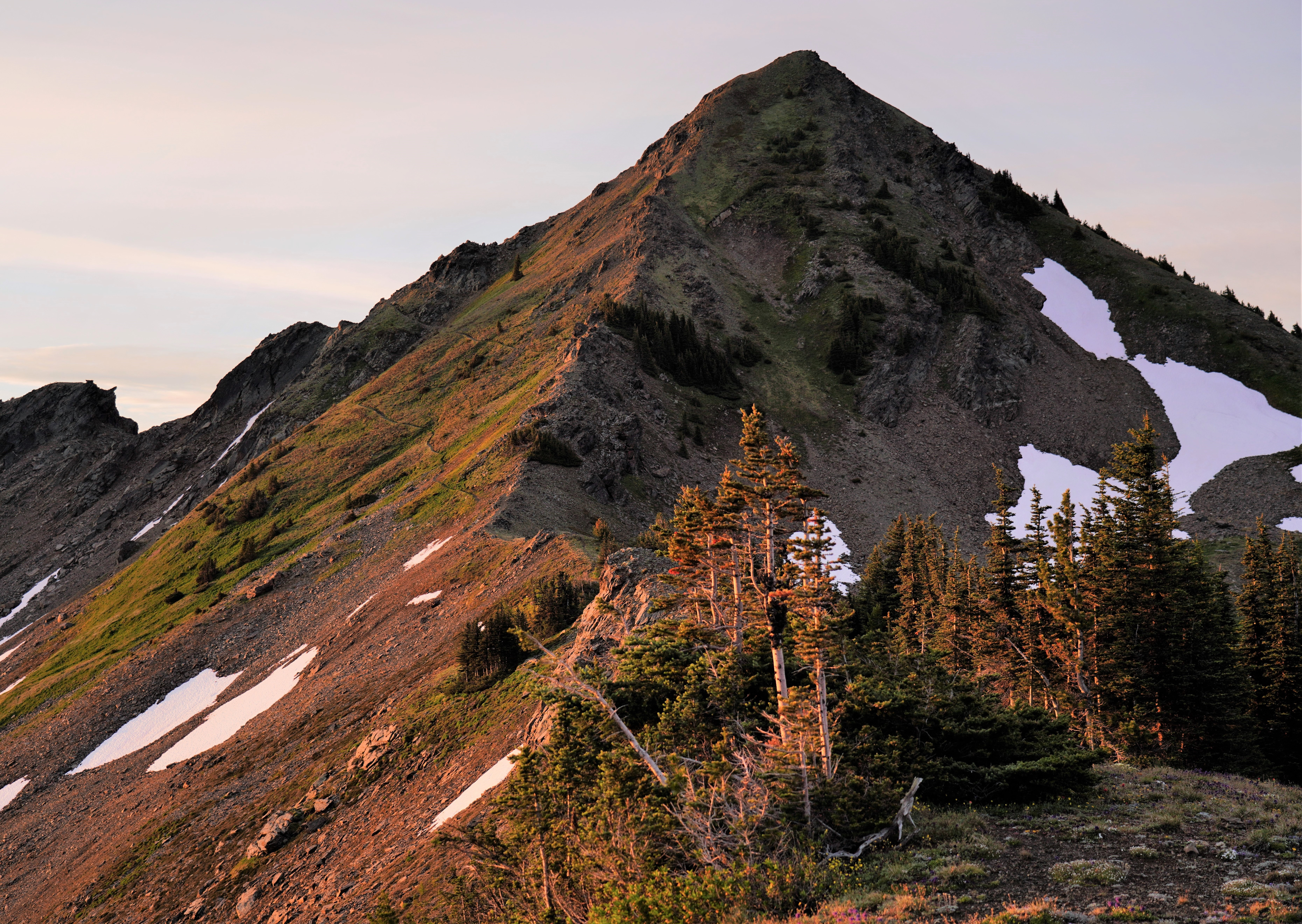
- Northwest aspect from Ladies Pass

Highest point
- Elevation: 7,316 ft (2,230 m)
- Prominence: 516 ft (157 m)
- Parent peak: Ladies Peak (7,708 ft)
- Isolation: 0.91 mi (1.46 km)
- Coordinates: 47°39′26″N 120°55′04″W

Geography
- Location within Washington (state) Location within the United States
- Country: United States
- State: Washington
- County: Chelan
- Protected area: Alpine Lakes Wilderness
- Parent range: Chiwaukum Mountains; Wenatchee Mountains; Cascade Range
- Topo map: USGS Chiwaukum Mountains

Geology
- Rock age: Late Cretaceous
- Rock type: Schist

Climbing
- Easiest route: Icicle Ridge Trail (#1570) + scrambling from Ladies Pass

Cape Horn is a 7,316-foot (2,230-metre) mountain summit located in Chelan County of Washington state. Cape Horn is situated 12 mi (19 km) west-northwest of Leavenworth, within the Alpine Lakes Wilderness, on land managed by the Okanogan–Wenatchee National Forest. Cape Horn is part of the Chiwaukum Mountains, a subset of the Cascade Range. The nearest higher neighbor is Ladies Peak, 0.9 mi (1.4 km) to the northwest, and Grindstone Mountain is set 1.4 mi (2.3 km) to the south. Precipitation runoff from Cape Horn drains west to Icicle Creek, whereas the east slopes drain into Chiwaukum Creek, and both are tributaries of the Wenatchee River. Although modest in elevation, relief is significant since this peak rises over 4,300 feet above Icicle Creek Valley in approximately two miles, and 2,100 feet (640 meters) above the Spanish Camp Creek in one mile. This mountain was named by Albert Hale Sylvester in 1909 for its sharp profile. This mountain's toponym has been officially by the United States Board on Geographic Names.

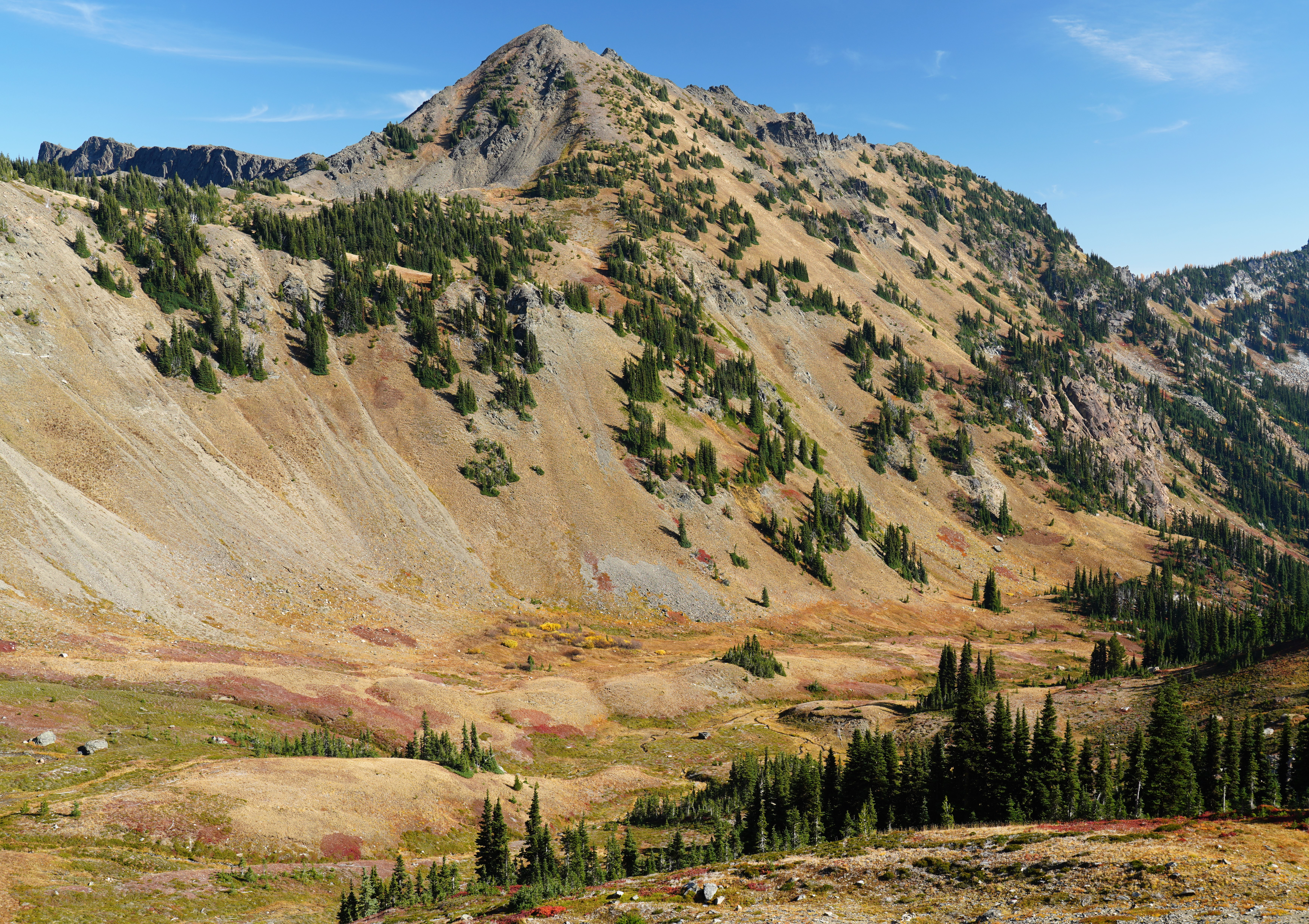
West aspect of Cape Horn

== Climate ==
Weather fronts originating in the Pacific Ocean travel east toward the Cascade Mountains. As fronts approach, they are forced upward by the peaks (orographic lift), causing them to drop their moisture in the form of rain or snowfall onto the Cascades. As a result, the Cascades experience high precipitation, especially during the winter months in the form of snowfall. During winter months, weather is usually cloudy, but, due to high pressure systems over the Pacific Ocean that intensify during summer months, there is often little or no cloud cover during the summer. The months June through October offer the most favorable weather for viewing or climbing this peak.

== Geology ==
The Alpine Lakes Wilderness features some of the most rugged topography in the Cascade Range with craggy peaks and ridges, deep glacial valleys, and granite walls spotted with over 700 mountain lakes. Geological events occurring many years ago created the diverse topography and drastic elevation changes over the Cascade Range leading to the various climate differences.

During the Pleistocene period dating back over two million years ago, glaciation advancing and retreating repeatedly scoured the landscape leaving deposits of rock debris. The last glacial retreat in the Alpine Lakes area began about 14,000 years ago and was north of the Canada–US border by 10,000 years ago. The U-shaped cross section of the river valleys is a result of that recent glaciation. Uplift and faulting in combination with glaciation have been the dominant processes which have created the tall peaks and deep valleys of the Alpine Lakes Wilderness area.

== See also ==
- List of peaks of the Alpine Lakes Wilderness
