= Lou Whittaker =

American mountaineer (1929–2024)

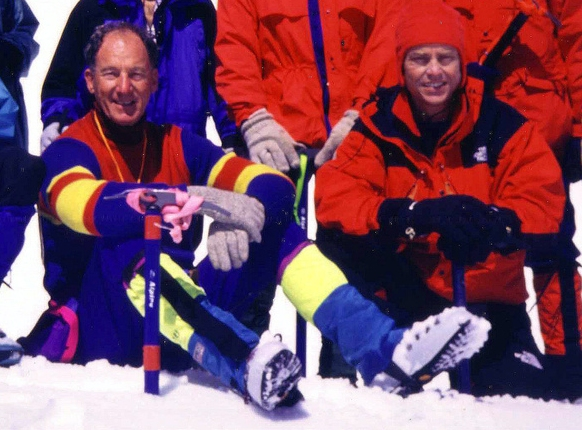
- Whittaker (left) in 1996 on Mount Rainier
- Born: February 10, 1929; Seattle, Washington, U.S.
- Died: March 24, 2024 (aged 95); Ashford, Washington, U.S.
- Occupation: Mountaineer
- Spouse(s): Patricia Wales (divorced) Ingrid Widmann (m. 1976)
- Children: 3

Louis Winslow Whittaker (February 10, 1929 – March 24, 2024) was an American mountaineer, mountain guide, and businessman. He and his twin brother, Jim Whittaker, also a renowned mountaineer and guide, were born and raised in Seattle.

== Biography ==
Lou Whittaker was born in Seattle, Washington, on February 10, 1929. He and his twin brother Jim began climbing mountains at age 12. The Whittakers completed their first summit of Mount Rainier at age 16 and had climbed all of the major peaks in Washington by age 18.

Besides his worldwide mountain climbing experience, Whittaker became the most experienced glacier-travel guide by climbing to the summit of Mount Rainier over 250 times. He also established Rainier Mountaineering, Inc. (now RMI Expeditions), developed a group of successful climbing-related businesses at the Rainier Base Camp in Ashford, adjacent to Mount Rainier National Park. There he led the training of several generations of Rainier guides, many of whom continue to guide and climb elsewhere. He also led the first American ascent of the North Col of Mount Everest in 1984.

Whittaker recorded his experiences in Lou Whittaker — Memoirs of a Mountain Guide, written with Andrea Gabbard.

Big Lou, a mountain in Chelan County, Washington is named for him.

He and his wife Ingrid had two sons, who also summited Mount Rainier at the age of 12. Lou Whittaker died from congestive heart failure in Ashford, Washington on March 24, 2024, at the age of 95.
