= Snowgrass Mountain =

Mountain in Washington (state), United States

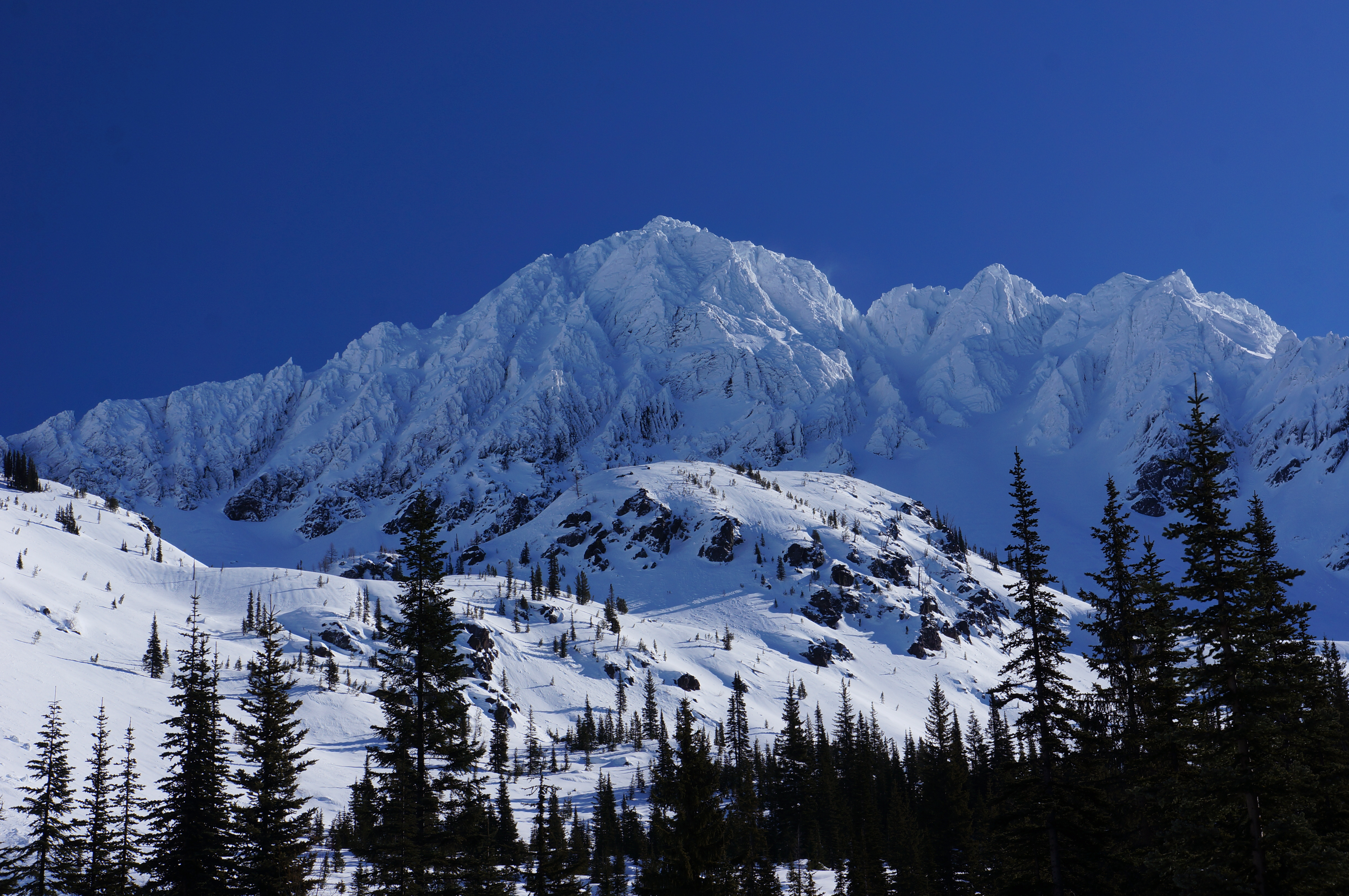
- Snowgrass Mountain

Highest point
- Elevation: 7,999 ft (2,438 m)
- Prominence: 445 ft (136 m)
- Parent peak: Big Chiwaukum (8,098 ft)
- Isolation: 1.28 mi (2.06 km)
- Coordinates: 47°41′02″N 120°55′58″W

Geography
- Location within Washington (state) Location within the United States
- Country: United States
- State: Washington
- County: Chelan
- Protected area: Alpine Lakes Wilderness
- Parent range: Chiwaukum Mountains; Wenatchee Mountains; Cascade Range
- Topo map: USGS Chiwaukum Mountains

Geology
- Rock age: Late Cretaceous
- Rock type: Schist

Climbing
- First ascent: 1914
- Easiest route: Scrambling

Snowgrass Mountain is a 7,999-foot (2,438-metre) mountain summit located in Chelan County of Washington state. Snowgrass Mountain is situated northeast of Frosty Pass and within the Alpine Lakes Wilderness. Snowgrass Mountain is the second-highest peak in the Chiwaukum Mountains which are a subrange of the Cascade Range. The nearest higher neighbor is Big Chiwaukum, 1.23 mi (1.98 km) to the north. Precipitation runoff from Snowgrass drains into tributaries of the Wenatchee River.

== Climate ==
Most weather fronts originating in the Pacific Ocean travel east toward the Cascade Mountains. As fronts approach, they are forced upward by the peaks of the Cascade Range (orographic lift), causing them to drop their moisture in the form of rain or snowfall onto the Cascades. As a result, the Cascades experience high precipitation, especially during the winter months in the form of snowfall. During winter months, weather is usually cloudy, but, due to high pressure systems over the Pacific Ocean that intensify during summer months, there is often little or no cloud cover during the summer.

== Geology ==
The Alpine Lakes Wilderness features some of the most rugged topography in the Cascade Range with craggy peaks and ridges, deep glacial valleys, and granite walls spotted with over 700 mountain lakes. Geological events occurring many years ago created the diverse topography and drastic elevation changes over the Cascade Range leading to the various climate differences.

Snowgrass Mountain is composed of schist, part of the Nason terrane laid down 210 million years ago. During the Pleistocene period dating back over two million years ago, glaciation advancing and retreating repeatedly scoured the landscape leaving deposits of rock debris. The last glacial retreat in the Alpine Lakes area began about 14,000 years ago and was north of the Canada–US border by 10,000 years ago. The U-shaped cross section of the river valleys is a result of that recent glaciation. Uplift and faulting in combination with glaciation have been the dominant processes which have created the tall peaks and deep valleys of the Alpine Lakes Wilderness area.

== See also ==
- List of peaks of the Alpine Lakes Wilderness

== Gallery ==
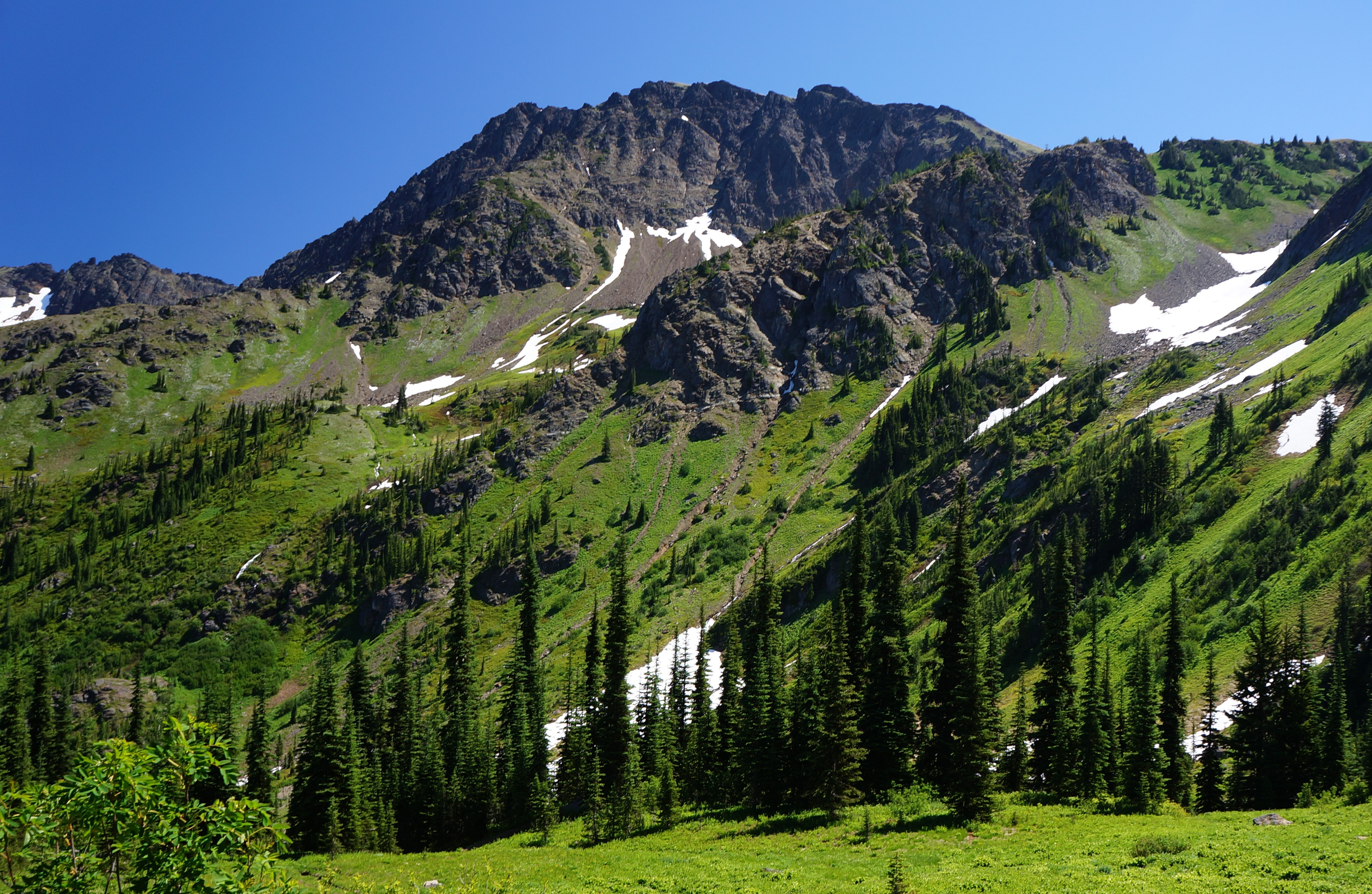
Snowgrass Mountain

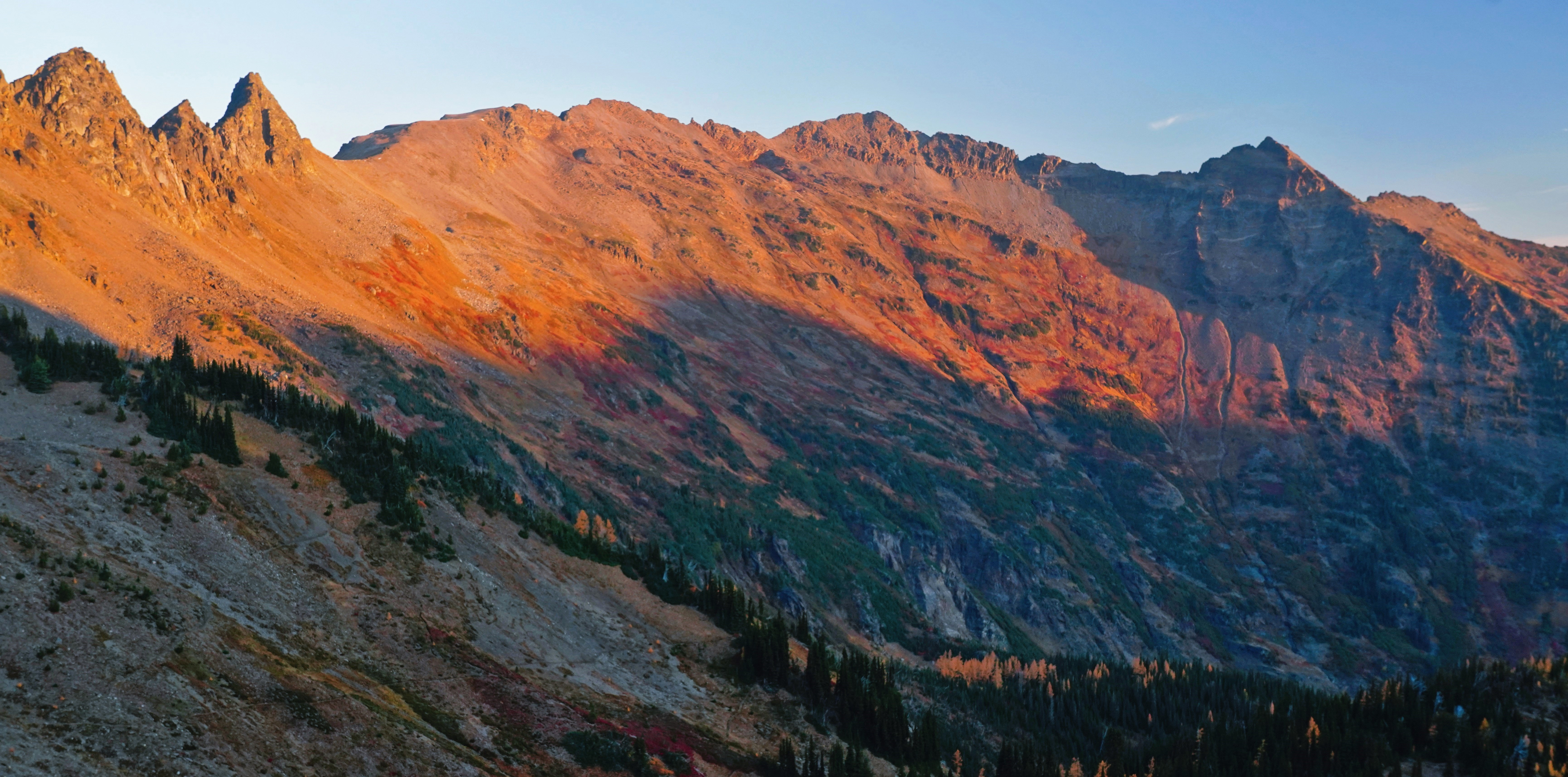
South-southeast aspect at sunrise

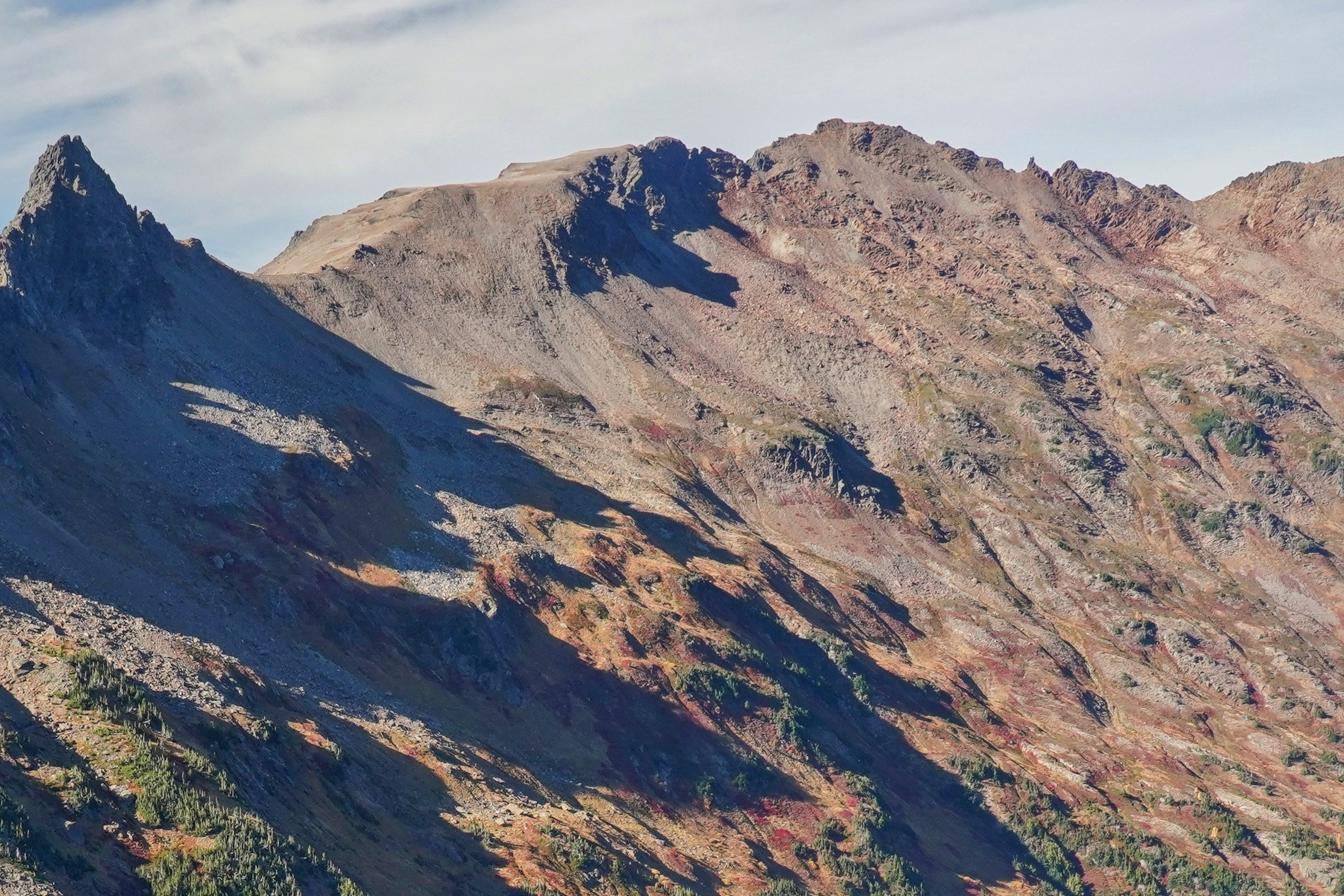
South-southeast aspect
