= Alexandria Area High School =

Location
- 4300 Pioneer Rd SE; Alexandria
- Coordinates: 45.8757952°N 95.3719822°W

Information
- Type: Public
- School district: Alexandria Public Schools
- Principal: Chad Duwenhoegger
- Teaching staff: 77.46 (FTE)
- Enrollment: 1,310 (2023–2024)
- Student to teacher ratio: 16.91
- Colors: Red and Black
- Mascot: Cardinal
- Website: https://www.alexschools.org/aahs

Alexandria Area High School is a public high school located in Alexandria, Minnesota. The school replaced Jefferson High School. It is a part of Alexandria Public Schools.

In addition to Alexandria, it serves the cities of Carlos, Forada, Garfield, Miltona, and Nelson; and the townships of Alexandria, Belle River, Brandon, Carlos, Holmes City, Hudson, Ida, LaGrand, Lake Mary, Leaf Valley, Miltona, Moe, Osakis, and Spruce Hill. It also serves Reno Township in Pope County.

== Academics ==
Alexandria Area High School offers more than 180 courses including college course opportunities, online selections, individualized study, and career/service mentorships. Many of these opportunities are given through the Alexandria Technical and Community College. In 2014, a new school and an arts center were built. The new facility includes athletic fields, a stadium, and a 1,000 seat auditorium. The new high school was renamed Alexandria Area High School and was designed by JLG Architects & Cuningham Group.

== Sports and activities ==
Alexandria offers more than 50 student activities including the full complement of Minnesota State High School League (MSHSL) offerings, featuring varsity sports, fine and performing arts, and numerous school clubs and organizations. Sports include:

- Fall: Football, Cross Country, Volleyball, Boys and Girls Soccer, Girls Tennis, and Girls Swimming/Diving.
- Winter: Boys and Girls Hockey, Boys and Girls Basketball, Boys Swimming/Diving, Dance Team, Nordic Ski and Alpine Ski, Wrestling, and Gymnastics.
- Spring: Baseball, Softball, Girls and Boys Track and Field, Girls and Boys Golf, Boys Tennis, and Adaptive Bowling.

Alexandria also has a music program, where dedicated and talented directors teach the art of music.

== Notable alumni ==
- Hal Haskins, professional basketball player
- John Hawkes (actor), actor
- Todd Hendricks, professional football player
- Tom Lehman, professional PGA golfer
- Mya Lesnar, NCAA indoor shot put champion
- Josh Meyers (ice hockey), professional hockey player
- Richard A. Peterson (aviator), fighter ace
- Myles Sansted, football player
- Gary Serum, pitcher Minnesota Twins
- Scott Stenzel, professional race car driver
