= Alexandria Public Schools (Minnesota) =

School district in Alexandria, Minnesota

Alexandria Public Schools is a school district headquartered in Alexandria, Minnesota.

In addition to Alexandria, it serves the cities of Carlos, Forada, Garfield, Miltona, and Nelson; and the townships of Alexandria, Belle River, Brandon, Carlos, Holmes City, Hudson, Ida, LaGrand, Lake Mary, Leaf Valley, Miltona, Moe, Osakis, and Spruce Hill. It also serves Reno Township in Pope County.

== Schools ==
Secondary

- Alexandria Area High School
- Discovery Middle School

Primary

- Carlos Elementary School
- Garfield Elementary School
- Lincoln Elementary School
- Voyager Elementary School
- Woodland Elementary School
- Miltona Science Magnet

Preschool

- Early Education Center
