= Miltona =

Miltona may refer to:

- Miltona, Minnesota
- Lake Miltona, a lake in Minnesota
- Miltona Township, Douglas County, Minnesota
