= Millerville =

Millerville can refer to a location in the United States:

- Millerville, Alabama
- Millerville, Minnesota
- Millerville Township, Douglas County, Minnesota
