= Spruce Center, Minnesota =

Unincorporated community in Minnesota, United States

Spruce Center
- Unincorporated community
- Location within Minnesota Location within the United States
- Coordinates: 46°04′14″N 95°13′25″W
- Country: United States
- State: Minnesota
- County: Douglas
- Elevation: 1,404 ft (428 m)
- Time zone: UTC-6 (Central (CST))
  - Summer (DST): UTC-5 (CDT)
- Area code: 320
- GNIS feature ID: 654957

Spruce Center is an unincorporated community in Douglas County, in the U.S. state of Minnesota.

Spruce Center was so named from its location within Spruce Hill Township.
