= Thomas A. Holmes =

American surveyor, trader, and politician

Member of the Minnesota Territorial House of Representatives
- In office September 3, 1849 – December 31, 1850

Personal details
- Born: Thomas Andrew Holmes; March 4, 1804 Burgettstown, Pennsylvania, U.S.
- Died: 1888 (aged 83–84) Cullman, Alabama, U.S.
- Party: Democratic
- Occupation: Surveyor; Trader

Thomas Andrew Holmes (March 4, 1804 – 1888) was an American surveyor, trader, and politician who served in the Minnesota Territorial House of Representatives from 1849 to 1850. He was involved in the foundation of numerous towns in Minnesota and Wisconsin, including Milwaukee. Holmes City, Minnesota, is named after him.

== Biography ==
Holmes was born in Pennsylvania in March 1804, one of five children. The family then moved to Northwest Ohio, around Marion.

Holmes and three other members of the family traveled to Milwaukee in 1835. The house that Holmes built on Water Street was the first frame dwelling on the East Side of the city. The following year they went down to the villages of Rockport and St. George, both part of what is now Janesville. Holmes and his brother, Joshua, filed the plat for the village of Rockport. They sold the land in 1839 and went separate ways, with most of the family staying in the area.

Holmes, however, traveled up the Mississippi River in a company of thirteen people, trying to get to the mouth of the St. Croix River. Among his company was his wife, foster child, brother-in-law, his brother-in-law's wife and their two children. Six laborers were also among them. He had to stop at the mouth of Waumandee Creek as the ice had prevented him from going further, though he originally stopped in what is now Winona but moved up the river at the insistence of his company. Holmes opened a trading post at the mouth of the creek and their settlement was referred to as "Holmes' Landing," now known as Fountain City. He sold his land in 1846 and continued up the Mississippi, with the intention that he would continue trading with the Native Americans.

In the winter of 1849 he went to Sauk Rapids in Minnesota Territory. A few months later, he was elected to the first Minnesota Territorial House of Representatives. He then traveled to Shakopee in 1851 and made it his permanent residence even after the Native Americans he traded with were removed. He also laid out and named the town in 1852. The name came from Chief Shakopee, a leader of a band of Dakota there. When it was decided that it would be the county seat of Scott County, Holmes donated the land necessary for county government. He did something similar with the city of Chaska when it became the seat of Carver County, though he was never a permanent resident there. He did, however, survey, locate, and name the town. He traveled up the Minnesota River and saw a 20-acre clearing in the Big Woods and claimed it as the town site of Chaska. In 1858, Holmes led a group of settlers to what is now Holmes City, in Douglas County. The settlers named it after him.

In 1862, Holmes and a group of seventy people took a wagon train to Montana. Holmes was designated as the military captain, secretary, treasurer, interpreter, and sergeant of the guard. He led them safely, closely following the 49th parallel north until they reached the border of Montana and then traveled down to Fort Benton. Holmes led two other expeditions to Montana, in 1864 and 1866.

Holmes died in Cullman, Alabama, in 1888.
