= 1886 St. Cloud–Sauk Rapids tornado outbreak =

Weather event in the United States

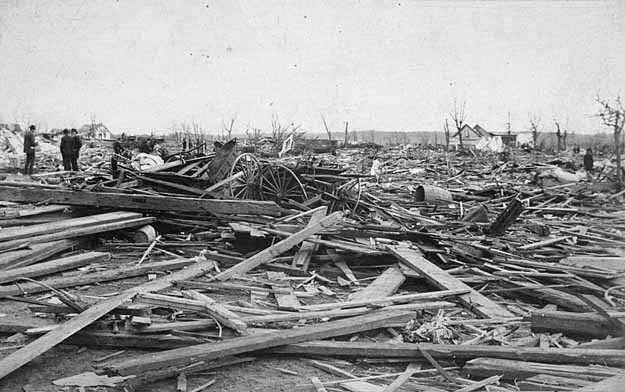
- Destruction in Sauk Rapids, Minnesota, after the F4 tornado of April 14, 1886

Meteorological history
- Duration: April 14–15, 1886

Tornado outbreak
- Tornadoes: ≥ 18 confirmed
- Max. rating: F4 tornado

Overall effects
- Casualties: ≥ 87 fatalities, ≥ 324 injuries
- Damage: (Note: All losses are in 1886 USD unless otherwise noted.)
- Areas affected: Midwestern and Southern United States

On April 14–15, 1886, a destructive tornado outbreak affected portions of the Midwestern and Southern United States. The outbreak generated at least 18 tornadoes, four of which were violent, including the St. Cloud–Sauk Rapids tornado, an F4 tornado that tore through the cities of St. Cloud, Sauk Rapids, and Rice, Minnesota, on April 14, destroying much of the town of Sauk Rapids and killing 72 people along its path. It is the deadliest tornado on record in Minnesota. Other tornadoes occurred in Iowa, Kansas, Missouri, and Texas on the same day, suggesting the possibility of a large outbreak. In all, the entire outbreak killed at least 87 people and injured at least 324. (Note: An outbreak is generally defined as a group of at least six tornadoes (the number sometimes varies slightly according to local climatology) with no more than a six-hour gap between individual tornadoes. An outbreak sequence, prior to (after) the start of modern records in 1950, is defined as a period of no more than two (one) consecutive days without at least one significant (F2 or stronger) tornado.) (Note: The Fujita scale was devised under the aegis of scientist T. Theodore Fujita in the early 1970s. Prior to the advent of the scale in 1971, tornadoes in the United States were officially unrated. While the Fujita scale has been superseded by the Enhanced Fujita scale in the U.S. since February 1, 2007, Canada utilized the old scale until April 1, 2013; nations elsewhere, like the United Kingdom, apply other classifications such as the TORRO scale.) (Note: Historically, the number of tornadoes globally and in the United States was and is likely underrepresented: research by Grazulis on annual tornado activity suggests that, as of 2001, only 53% of yearly U.S. tornadoes were officially recorded. Documentation of tornadoes outside the United States was historically less exhaustive, owing to the lack of monitors in many nations and, in some cases, to internal political controls on public information. Most countries only recorded tornadoes that produced severe damage or loss of life. Significant low biases in U.S. tornado counts likely occurred through the early 1990s, when advanced NEXRAD was first installed and the National Weather Service began comprehensively verifying tornado occurrences.)

== Confirmed tornadoes ==
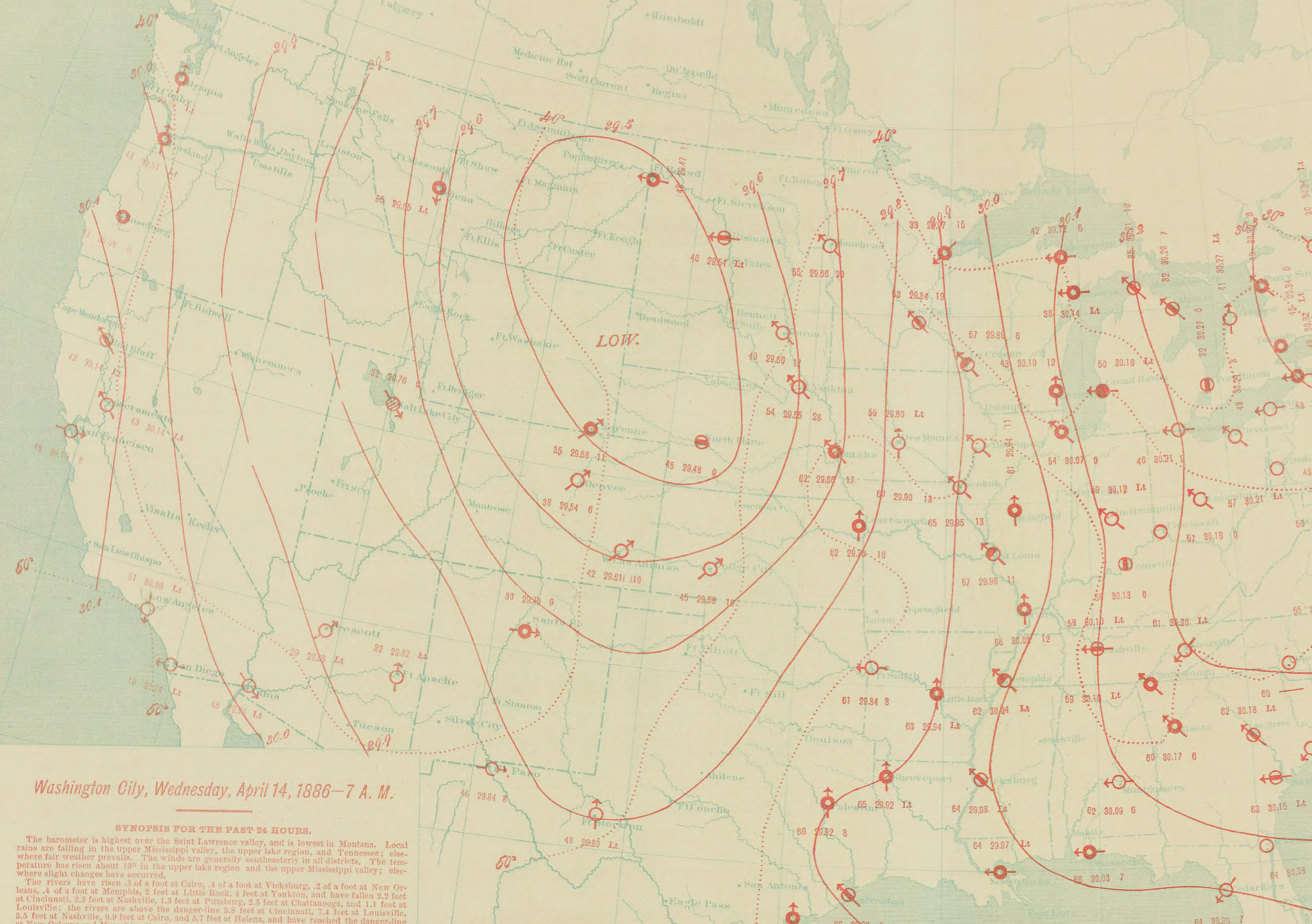
Weather map of the storm system that would produce the tornado outbreak in the Midwestern and Southern United States on April 14, 1886.

The ratings for these tornadoes were done by tornado expert Thomas P. Grazulis and are not official ratings.

Confirmed tornadoes by Fujita rating
FU	F0	F1	F2	F3	F4	F5	Total
?	?	?	10	4	4	0	18

=== April 14 event ===
Confirmed tornadoes – Wednesday, April 14, 1886 (Note: All dates are based on the local time zone where the tornado touched down; however, all times are in Coordinated Universal Time and dates are split at midnight CST/CDT for consistency.) (Note: Prior to 1994, only the average widths of tornado paths were officially listed.)
F#	Location	County / Parish	State	Time (UTC)	Path length	Max. width	Summary
F2	Shubert	Richardson	NE	21:00–?	5 miles (8.0 km)	100 yards (91 m)	1 death – Tornado injured 10 people and destroyed or damaged three or more homes.
F2	Lake Reno to Lake Mary	Pope, Douglas	MN	21:00–?	9 miles (14 km)	Unknown	Tornado destroyed or damaged six barns on five farmsteads. A few homes lost their roofs or tipped onto their sides.
F4	S of Griswold to NNE of Coon Rapids	Cass, Audubon, Guthrie, Carroll	IA	21:00–?	55 miles (89 km)	400 yards (370 m)	3 deaths – Long-tracked tornado family destroyed or damaged 70 farmhouses, several of which were swept clean of debris, leaving only foundations behind. Hundreds of cattle were killed and a train was thrown off its tracks. Tornado also destroyed 32 structures in Coon Rapids, nine of which were homes. 18 injuries were reported along the path and losses were estimated at $100,000.
F4	SSW of St. Cloud to Sauk Rapids to SSE of Rice	Stearns, Benton	MN	22:20–?	25 miles (40 km)	800 yards (730 m)	72 deaths – See section on this tornado – 213 people were injured and losses totaled $400,000.
F2	ESE of Oneida	Nemaha	KS	22:30–?	3 miles (4.8 km)	200 yards (180 m)	Tornado injured four children and destroyed several homes.
F2	E of Hubbard to E of Park Rapids	Hubbard	MN	22:30–?	10 miles (16 km)	200 yards (180 m)	Tornado injured seven people, downed hundreds of trees, unroofed a few farmhouses, and destroyed a number of barns. As the tornado crossed Long Lake it tossed water 100 ft (30 m) high.
F4	SW of Little Rock to SW of Buckman	Benton, Morrison	MN	22:50–?	14 miles (23 km)	200 yards (180 m)	2 deaths – Tornado formed from the same supercell as the St. Cloud–Sauk Rapids F4. Two entire farms were obliterated and seven people were injured. "Tons" of debris from St. Cloud littered the landscape.
F2	E of Story City	Story	IA	23:00–?	3 miles (4.8 km)	70 yards (64 m)	Tornado caused one injury and unroofed or partly destroyed three homes, one of which lost its upper story. Several barns were destroyed as well.
F2	N of Circleville to E of Wetmore	Jackson, Nemaha	KS	23:30–?	7 miles (11 km)	50 yards (46 m)	Tornado injured four people and destroyed four homes, along with stables and barns.
F2	NW of Churdan	Greene	IA	00:00–?	Unknown	Unknown	Tornado destroyed several barns.
F3	Lickskillet to Strahan to Wheeler Grove	Fremont, Mills, Montgomery, Pottawattamie	IA	00:15–?	45 miles (72 km)	100 yards (91 m)	Long-tracked tornado family destroyed at least 15 homes. Tornado began south of Thurman and passed west of Sidney. Near Sidney a school was destroyed and scattered for 2 mi (3.2 km). At Strahan the tornado destroyed a church and a store. Five homes, a church, and several other structures were damaged or destroyed in Wheeler Grove. Five injuries occurred along the path.
F4	N of Mound City to Burlington Junction	Holt, Nodaway	MO	01:30–?	15 miles (24 km)	300 yards (270 m)	6 deaths – Tornado destroyed structures on 15 farmsteads, including four homes that were leveled. 20 injuries were reported.
F3	NW of Bedford to Prescott	Taylor, Adams	IA	01:45–?	20 miles (32 km)	200 yards (180 m)	Tornado injured 15 people and destroyed several homes, leaving only scattered pieces of lumber behind.
F2	Blodgett	Scott	MO	03:00–?	Unknown	Unknown	3 deaths – Tornado injured two people and destroyed three farmhouses.
F2	W of Orient to E of Greenfield	Adair	IA	03:00–?	5 miles (8.0 km)	100 yards (91 m)	Tornado injured two people and destroyed three farmhouses.
F3	S of Rhome	Wise, Denton	TX	03:45–?	15 miles (24 km)	300 yards (270 m)	Tornado produced possible F4–F5 damage to five farmsteads, but little information was available with which to assign a rating higher than F3. 13 injuries were reported along the path, and total losses reached $100,000. One death may have occurred.
F3	SW of Terrell	Kaufman	TX	04:00–?	4 miles (6.4 km)	200 yards (180 m)	Farms were obliterated, possibly at F4 intensity, but information was insufficient with which to assign a rating higher than F3.

=== April 15 event ===
Confirmed tornadoes – Thursday, April 15, 1886
F#	Location	County / Parish	State	Time (UTC)	Path length	Max. width	Summary
F2	Island Ford	Rutherford	NC	23:00–?	5 miles (8.0 km)	Unknown	Tornado injured five people and destroyed a few homes.

=== St. Cloud–Sauk Rapids, Minnesota ===
St. Cloud–Sauk Rapids, Minnesota
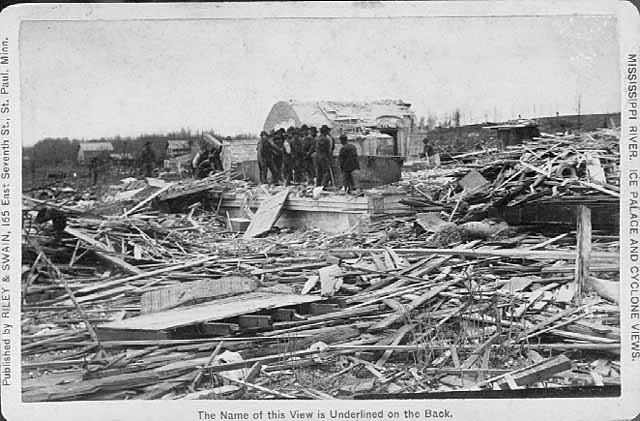
- The Sauk Rapids courthouse in ruins

Meteorological history
- Formed: April 14, 1886; 4:20 p.m. CST (UTC−06:00); Stearns County, Minnesota

Tornado outbreak
- Max. rating: F4 tornado

Overall effects
- Casualties: 72 fatalities, 213 injuries
- Damage: $400,000 (1886 USD) $14.3 million (2025 USD)
- Areas affected: Central Minnesota, United States

At 4:20 p.m., a tornado of approximately F4 intensity cut through the heart of Sauk Rapids. It was one of at least four tornadoes that affected the region between 3:00 p.m. – 5:00 p.m. that day. It had a maximum width of 1/2 mi (0.80 km) and covered an area of 14 mi (23 km). As the storm moved across the Mississippi River, it temporarily sucked the river dry. Some of the structures the tornado destroyed included an iron truss bridge spanning the Mississippi River, the post office, the courthouse, a flour mill, a school, and two churches. 15 railcars were demolished, and iron rails from the train track were pulled up and mangled. After passing through Sauk Rapids, the tornado moved on to Rice, where it killed 11 people in a wedding party, including the groom, when the home they were occupying was destroyed. In all, 72 people were killed by the twister, including 38 in Sauk Rapids and 20 in St. Cloud. Over 200 more were injured.

== Impact, aftermath, and recovery ==
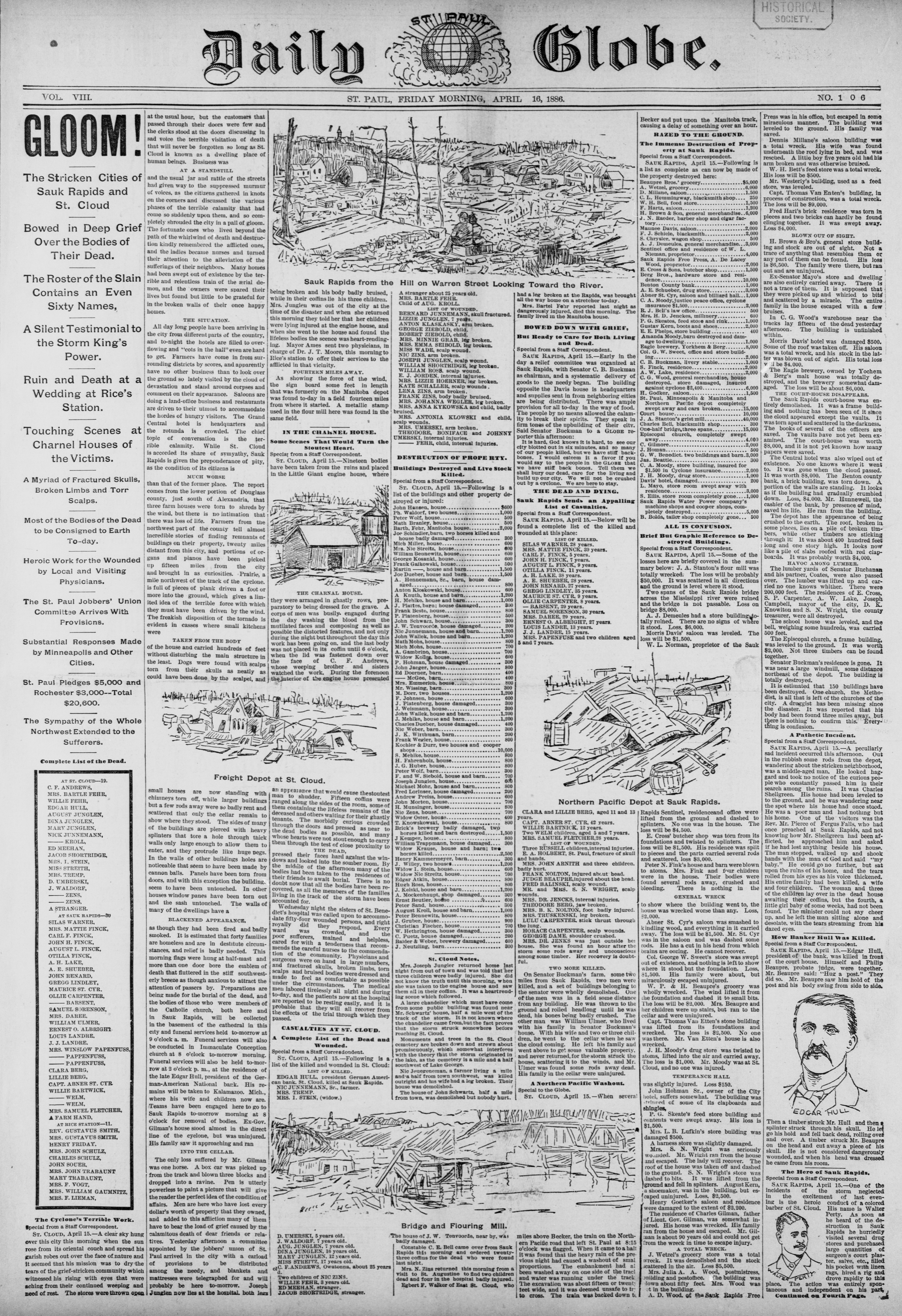
St. Paul Daily Globe coverage on April 18, 1886

St. Benedict's Hospital in St. Cloud, which was spared by the tornado, became the center of relief efforts following the destruction. The Benedictine nuns who operated the hospital worked 48 hours straight until aid arrived from the nearby towns of Minneapolis and St. Paul. Over 50 patients were taken to St. Mary's school and convent in St. Joseph, where the teaching sisters served as nurses.

Before the tornado struck, Sauk Rapids was considered one of the most important towns in Minnesota and a center of business for central Minnesota. It was a blossoming community located on the Mississippi River. However, the tornado changed the economic structure of the entire area, destroying at least 109 commercial and public buildings in Sauk Rapids alone, including every business on Main Street, and causing over $400,000 ($14,333,000 in 2025) in damages. After the tornado, St. Cloud became the dominant business center in the region.

== See also ==
- Climate of Minnesota
- List of Minnesota weather records
- List of North American tornadoes and tornado outbreaks

== Sources ==
- "Winds". Monthly Weather Review. 14 (4). Washington, D.C.: United States Army Signal Corps: 100–1. April 1886. doi:10.1175/1520-0493(1886)14[100b:W]2.0.CO;2.
- Hill, E. S. (2019). "SBM.05d Aftermath of the cyclone in St. Cloud that left 58 dead and hundreds injured, April 14, 1886". St. Cloud, MN: Image Collection of the College of Saint Benedict/Saint John's University.
- Grazulis, Thomas P. (July 1993). Significant Tornadoes 1680–1991: A Chronology and Analysis of Events. St. Johnsbury, Vermont: The Tornado Project of Environmental Films. ISBN 1-879362-03-1.
- Grazulis, Thomas P. (2001a). The Tornado: Nature's Ultimate Windstorm. Norman: University of Oklahoma Press. ISBN 978-0-8061-3538-0.
- Grazulis, Thomas P. (2001b). F5-F6 Tornadoes. St. Johnsbury, Vermont: The Tornado Project of Environmental Films.
- Welter, Ben (May 6, 2013). "April 15, 1886: St. Cloud, Sauk Rapids in ruins". Star Tribune. OCLC 43369847.
- Zurek, Ronald Christopher (2002). Sauk Rapids and Benton County. Arcadia Publishing. ISBN 9780738519609. - Total pages: 128
