= St. Cloud Hospital =

- CentraCare Health System

Geography
- Location: St. Cloud, Minnesota, United States
- Coordinates: 45°34′31″N 94°10′9″W

Organization
- Care system: Medicare, Medicaid, Charity, Public
- Type: Regional referral system
- Affiliated university: None

Services
- Standards: Joint Commission Accredited
- Emergency department: Level II trauma center
- Beds: 489

History
- Founded: 1886 as St. Benedict's; 1890 as St. Raphael's; 1928 as St. Cloud

Links
- Website: St. Cloud Hospital
- Lists: Hospitals in Minnesota

St. Cloud Hospital is a hospital in St. Cloud, Minnesota, United States. It is a Catholic-affiliated, not-for-profit institution and part of CentraCare Health. The hospital has more than 9,000 employees, 400 physicians and 1,200 volunteers. It serves 690,000 people in a 12-county area.

== History ==
What would eventually become St. Cloud Hospital began as a succession of hospitals beginning in the late 1880s.

The first such institution was St. Benedict's Hospital, founded in 1886 by a group of Roman Catholic nuns from the Order of St. Benedict at the urging of Dr. A.C. Lamothe Ramsay. The hospital played a major role in aid following the Sauk Rapids Cyclone and was in need of expansion by 1889.

In 1889, the sisters accepted a gift of land southeast of the city for a larger hospital, St. Raphael's, and the new facility opened on May 30, 1890. However, the failure of the city to extend roads and bridges to the area made it virtually inaccessible. The hospital never held more than seven patients at a time. Ten years later, a new hospital was constructed adjacent to the original building in 1900.

St. Cloud Hospital in 1932

After years of increasing patient admissions, the sisters broke ground on a new hospital north of St. Cloud in May 1926. The hospital was renamed St. Cloud Hospital and formally dedicated on February 9, 1928. This remains the current site of the hospital.

In 1962, the sisters relinquished ownership of St. Cloud Hospital and incorporated it into a not-for-profit corporation. In 1975, the Diocese of St. Cloud joined with the sisters in helping to maintain the Catholic character of the hospital. Since 1995, the hospital has operated under the auspices of the local Catholic Church of St. Cloud.

Also in 1995, the corporations of St. Cloud Hospital and the St. Cloud Clinic of Internal Medicine merged to form the nonprofit CentraCare Health System.

== Site ==
St. Cloud Hospital's main site is located north of downtown St. Cloud on the west bank of the Mississippi River. The hospital building has 11 floors (seven above ground), 1,496,000 sq ft (139,000 m^{2}) of floor space (not including the attached CentraCare Clinic), and sits on a 30.4 acres (0.123 km^{2}) plot of land.

== Hospital services ==
=== CentraCare Heart & Vascular Center ===
The CentraCare Heart & Vascular Center is dedicated to the prevention, discovery and management of cardiac disease. It is a full-service heart center with advanced capabilities in interventional cardiology, electrophysiology and cardiac surgery.

The heart center is staffed by cardiologists, surgeons, and nurses and includes technology such as a 64-slice CT scanner and induced hypothermia equipment. Services include diagnostic cardiology, interventional cardiology, cardiac surgery, electrophysiology, peripheral vascular program, pediatric cardiology, nuclear medicine and cardiac rehabilitation.

A research department also allows patients to participate in clinical trials with programs such as Cleveland Clinic, Mayo Clinic and Duke University.

=== Surgical & Special Care Services ===
Surgical & Special Care Services encompasses outpatient surgery, inpatient surgery, a surgical care unit, a progressive care unit and intensive care. The department has 18 operating rooms, over 100 surgeons, and performs 14,000 operations a year.

Inpatient and outpatient surgery serves patients requiring trauma, orthopedic, urological, ear/nose/throat, retina, cardiovascular, neurological, plastic and bariatric surgery. The surgical staff is experienced in laparoscopic, minimally invasive and muscle-sparing techniques, as well as the robotic Da Vinci Surgical System.

The surgical care unit includes contains eight progressive care beds for patients requiring a greater level of care.

=== Coborn Cancer Center ===
The Coborn Cancer Center is a Comprehensive Community Cancer Program certified by the American College of Surgeons that provides medical oncology evaluation and care and an extensive range of treatment options to support cancer patients and their families. The center is the first program in the United States to become a member of the Mayo Clinic Cancer Care Network.

Services include chemotherapy, radiation therapy, diagnostic imaging (including CT scanning) and clinical drug trials.

The St. Cloud Hospital Breast Center also offers breast cancer screenings, assessments, diagnostic work-ups, education and treatment plans as well as a mobile mammography unit and other services.

=== Bone & Joint Center ===
The Bone & Joint Center is collaboration between St. Cloud Hospital and St. Cloud Orthopedic Associates. It offers an array of specialty and subspecialty orthopedic surgical services.

Services include an inpatient unit, inpatient and outpatient surgery, emergency and trauma care, total joint replacements, total joint revisions, sports medicine, spinal surgery, shoulder surgery, arthroscopic surgery, foot and angle surgery, fracture care and specialized imaging services including musculoskeletal radiology.

=== Emergency Trauma Center ===
The Emergency Trauma Center is certified by the American College of Surgeons as a Level II trauma center. The center has 38 private patient rooms including those dedicated to the special needs of children, trauma victims and psychiatric patients.

Trauma center staff are board-certified emergency medicine physicians and nurses certified in trauma care and advanced life support.

The facility includes an FAA-approved helipad serviced by LifeLink III air ambulance.

=== Neurosciences & Rehabilitation Center ===
The Neurosciences & Rehabilitation Center offers services designed to enhance the quality of life for adult and pediatric patients.

The care center includes:

- Neuromedical and neurosurgical inpatient unit, including neurodiagnostic and stroke care
- 20-bed inpatient rehabilitation unit
- St. Cloud Hospital Sleep Center, for diagnosing and treating sleep disorders
- St Cloud Hospital Rehabilitation Center, providing outpatient physical, occupational and speech therapy for neck and back pain, traumatic brain injuries, stroke and work-related injuries, as well as rehabilitation for pediatric developmental or acquired disabilities
- Respiratory Care, providing assessment, treatment and pulmonary function testing, as well as outpatient pulmonary rehabilitation

=== Women & Children's Center ===
Parent, Child & Women's Services includes the Family Birthing Center, Children's Center, Child & Adolescent Specialty Center and Women's Health.

Within the Children's Center, a Level II and III neonatal intensive care unit provides specialized care to premature infants and newborns with serious health conditions. And inpatient pediatric unit offers care for sick children, while the pediatric intensive care unit cares for children with life-threatening illnesses.

The Child & Adolescent Specialty Center offers specialized outpatient services for allergies, behavioral health, cardiology, cleft and craniofacial care, cancer, urology and outpatient procedures requiring brief observation.

Women's Health offers inpatient gynecology care and an outpatient Women's Specialty Center. Inpatient care includes education and support from a women's health case manager for women recovering from gynecological surgeries. The Specialty Center offers women's health education, a women's health library, perinatology and behavioral health services.

=== Home Care & Hospice Services ===
Home Care combines telemonitoring technology with care provided by nurses, physical occupational and speech therapists, social workers, and home health aides. Services include rehabilitation, wound care, pediatrics, infusion and palliative care.

=== Behavioral Health Services ===
Behavioral Health Services offers a range of mental health and chemical dependency services including child, adolescent and adult outpatient treatment, partial hospitalization and inpatient services.

The Behavioral Health Clinic provides outpatient mental health services, including evaluations, testing, counseling and treatment for mental health problems.
