= English Grove Lake =

Lake in the state of Minnesota, United States

- Location within Minnesota Location within the United States
- Location: Douglas County, Minnesota
- Coordinates: 45°46′28″N 95°11′38″W
- Type: lake
- Basin countries: United States
- Surface elevation: 1,358 ft (414 m)

English Grove Lake is a lake in Douglas County, in the U.S. state of Minnesota.

English Grove Lake was named for the nearby groves of settler William T. English.

== See also ==
- List of lakes in Minnesota
