= Hubred Lake =

Lake in the state of Minnesota, United States

- Location within Minnesota Location within the United States
- Location: Douglas County, Minnesota
- Coordinates: 45°57′27″N 95°45′15″W
- Type: lake
- Basin countries: United States
- Surface elevation: 1,260 ft (384 m)

Hubred Lake is a lake in Douglas County, in the U.S. state of Minnesota.

Hubred Lake was named for Oliver Hubred, a pioneer farmer who settled there.

== See also ==
- List of lakes in Minnesota
