= Osakis =

Osakis can refer to a community in the United States:

- Osakis, Minnesota
- Osakis Township, Douglas County, Minnesota
