= Water Street =

Water Street may refer to:

== Streets and neighborhoods ==
=== Canada ===
- Water Street (St. John's), Newfoundland and Labrador
- Water Street, Vancouver, British Columbia

=== Hong Kong ===
- Water Street, Hong Kong
  - Water Street (constituency) around Water Street, Hong Kong

=== United Kingdom ===
- Water Street, Liverpool

=== United States ===
- Water Street (Augusta, Maine)
- Water Street, Milwaukee, in Wisconsin
- Water Street, Pennsylvania, an unincorporated village
- Water Street (Tampa), a neighborhood in Tampa, Florida
- Water Street, a street in Manhattan, New York

== Other uses ==
- Water Street (poems), a book of poetry by James Merrill
- Water Street (album), a 2008 music album by Sweatshop Union

== See also ==
- Water Street Music Hall, a concert hall in Rochester, New York
- Water Street Mission, rescue mission in Manhattan, New York
- 55 Water Street, office building in Manhattan, New York
