= Lake Moses =

Lake in the state of Minnesota, United States

- Location within Minnesota
- Location: Douglas County, Minnesota
- Coordinates: 46°3′41″N 95°35′56″W
- Type: lake

Lake Moses is a lake in Douglas County, in the U.S. state of Minnesota.

Lake Moses was named after Moses from the Hebrew Bible.
