= Alexandria Public Schools =

Alexandria Public Schools may refer to:

- Alexandria City Public Schools (Virginia)
- Alexandria Public Schools (Minnesota)
