= Stockhaven Lake =

Lake in the state of Minnesota, United States

- Location within Minnesota
- Location: Douglas County, Minnesota
- Coordinates: 46°3′6″N 95°38′11″W
- Type: lake

Stockhaven Lake is a lake in Douglas County, in the U.S. state of Minnesota.

Stockhaven Lake derives its name from Hans G. von Stackhausen, a pioneer who settled there in 1870.

== See also ==
- List of lakes in Minnesota
