= Vermont Lake =

Lake in the state of Minnesota, United States

- Location within Minnesota
- Location: Douglas County, Minnesota
- Coordinates: 46°4′55″N 95°22′23″W
- Type: lake

Vermont Lake is a lake in Douglas County, in the U.S. state of Minnesota.

A number of the first settlers being natives of Vermont caused the name to be selected.

== See also ==
- List of lakes in Minnesota
