= Lake Le Homme Dieu =

Lake in the state of Minnesota, United States

- Location within Minnesota
- Location: Douglas County, Minnesota
- Coordinates: 45°55′43″N 95°20′56″W
- Type: lake

Lake Le Homme Dieu is a lake in Douglas County, in the U.S. state of Minnesota.

Lake Le Homme Dieu was named for a friend of Gleny King, an early settler. The name comes from French "L'homme de Dieu", meaning "The man of God".

== See also ==
- List of lakes in Minnesota
