= Spruce Hill =

Spruce Hill may refer to:

- Spruce Hill Township, Minnesota
- Spruce Hill Township, Pennsylvania
- Spruce Hill, Philadelphia, Pennsylvania, a neighborhood in Philadelphia
