= Lake Sina =

Lake in the state of Minnesota, United States

- Location within Minnesota Location within the United States
- Location: Douglas County, Minnesota
- Coordinates: 46°2′36″N 95°39′44″W
- Type: lake
- Basin countries: United States
- Surface elevation: 1,362 ft (415 m)

Lake Sina is a lake in Douglas County, in the U.S. state of Minnesota.

Lake Sina was named after the biblical Mount Sinai.

== See also ==
- List of lakes in Minnesota
