= Holmes City Township, Douglas County, Minnesota =

Holmes City Township, Minnesota
- Township
- Location within the state of Minnesota Holmes City Township, Minnesota (the United States)
- Coordinates: 45°49′20″N 95°34′30″W
- Country: United States
- State: Minnesota
- County: Douglas

Area
  - Total: 36.4 sq mi (94.2 km^{2})
  - Land: 30.4 sq mi (78.7 km^{2})
  - Water: 6.0 sq mi (15.6 km^{2})
- Elevation: 1,381 ft (421 m)

Population (2000)
  - Total: 737
  - Density: 24/sq mi (9.4/km^{2})
- Time zone: UTC-6 (Central (CST))
  - Summer (DST): UTC-5 (CDT)
- ZIP code: 56341
- Area code: 320
- FIPS code: 27-29798
- GNIS feature ID: 0664503
- Website: http://holmescitytownship.org/

Holmes City Township is a township in Douglas County, Minnesota, United States. The population was 799 at the 2020 census. Within the township is located the unincorporated community of Holmes City.

Holmes City Township was organized in 1866, and named for Thomas Andrew Holmes, a pioneer settler.

== Geography ==
According to the United States Census Bureau, the township has a total area of 36.4 square miles (94 km^{2}), of which 30.4 square miles (79 km^{2}) is land and 6.0 square miles (16 km^{2}) (16.52%) is water.

== Demographics ==
As of the census of 2000, there were 737 people, 278 households, and 214 families residing in the township. The population density was 24.3 inhabitants per square mile (9.4/km^{2}). There were 425 housing units at an average density of 14.0 per square mile (5.4/km^{2}). The racial makeup of the township was 97.42% White, 0.14% African American, 0.14% Asian, 1.49% from other races, and 0.81% from two or more races. Hispanic or Latino of any race were 1.49% of the population.

There were 278 households, out of which 36.3% had children under the age of 18 living with them, 72.3% were married couples living together, 2.2% had a female householder with no husband present, and 23.0% were non-families. 19.4% of all households were made up of individuals, and 6.8% had someone living alone who was 65 years of age or older. The average household size was 2.65 and the average family size was 3.07.

In the township the population was spread out, with 28.4% under the age of 18, 4.9% from 18 to 24, 25.6% from 25 to 44, 29.0% from 45 to 64, and 12.1% who were 65 years of age or older. The median age was 40 years. For every 100 females, there were 107.6 males. For every 100 females age 18 and over, there were 107.9 males.

The median income for a household in the township was $35,000, and the median income for a family was $42,639. Males had a median income of $30,192 versus $17,500 for females. The per capita income for the township was $17,411. About 3.3% of families and 4.2% of the population were below the poverty line, including 1.7% of those under age 18 and 7.4% of those age 65 or over.
