= History of St. Cloud Hospital =

St. Cloud Hospital in 1932

The history of St. Cloud Hospital is the succession of events and hospitals that led to the creation of the current St. Cloud Hospital in St. Cloud, Minnesota, United States.

== St. Benedict's Hospital ==
In 1852, several Catholic nuns of the Order of St. Benedict immigrated to America from a convent in Eichstätt, Germany. It was their intention to provide education to pioneer towns in Pennsylvania. In 1857, some of these sisters arrived in St. Cloud, Minnesota, and in 1863, they moved to St. Joseph and established St. Benedict's Monastery.

Being educators, the sisters had no experience in health care. However, Dr. A.C. Lamothe Ramsay persuaded the sisters that the growing St. Cloud community needed a hospital. After reflecting on the Rule's instruction of providing for the sick, the sisters accepted the challenge. They bought a building on Ninth Avenue North, and with modifications, opened it as St. Benedict's Hospital on February 25, 1886.

Since hospitals on the frontier were looked upon as places for dying, not healing, the hospital almost closed due to a lack of patients. However, according to tradition, the sisters decided to pray for nine successive days asking for a sign about the future of the hospital. On the fifth day, April 14, 1886, the Sauk Rapids Cyclone struck St. Cloud and neighboring Sauk Rapids. Although all the buildings in the area were demolished, the hospital remained untouched. It became the center of the rescue effort for the hundreds who were dying or injured. The care that the sisters gave convinced residents that the hospital could be a place for healing.

Admissions began to increase and soon thirteen area doctors were sending patients to St. Benedict's Hospital. In 1888, the sisters began advertising "Hospital Admission" tickets, a predecessor to modern-day health insurance. For $10 a year, purchasers were entitled to treatment, subsistence, and nursing care in the hospital, unless their injury or illness resulted from intoxication or fighting.

== St. Raphael's Hospital ==
By 1889, the sisters needed a larger facility, away from the bustle of the city and nearby railroad tracks. The sisters received a donation of five acres on the east side of the Mississippi River from a local realty firm, Coates and Freeman. Prominent local citizens encouraged the sisters to accept the land, assuring them that roads and a bridge across the river would be built, giving patients access to the facility. On May 30, 1890, the new St. Raphael's Hospital opened.

However, the bridge and roads never materialized. Crossing the river by boat and finding a horse and buggy for the final miles on rutted trails proved prohibitive. Only 94 patients were treated during the first year. After struggling to keep the hospital open, the sisters decided to return to Ninth Avenue. In 1900, next to the first St. Benedict's Hospital, they built another hospital, St. Raphael's, which was a modest four-story brick structure for 50 patients. A fire in 1905 gutted the top two floors, but the sisters quickly rebuilt.

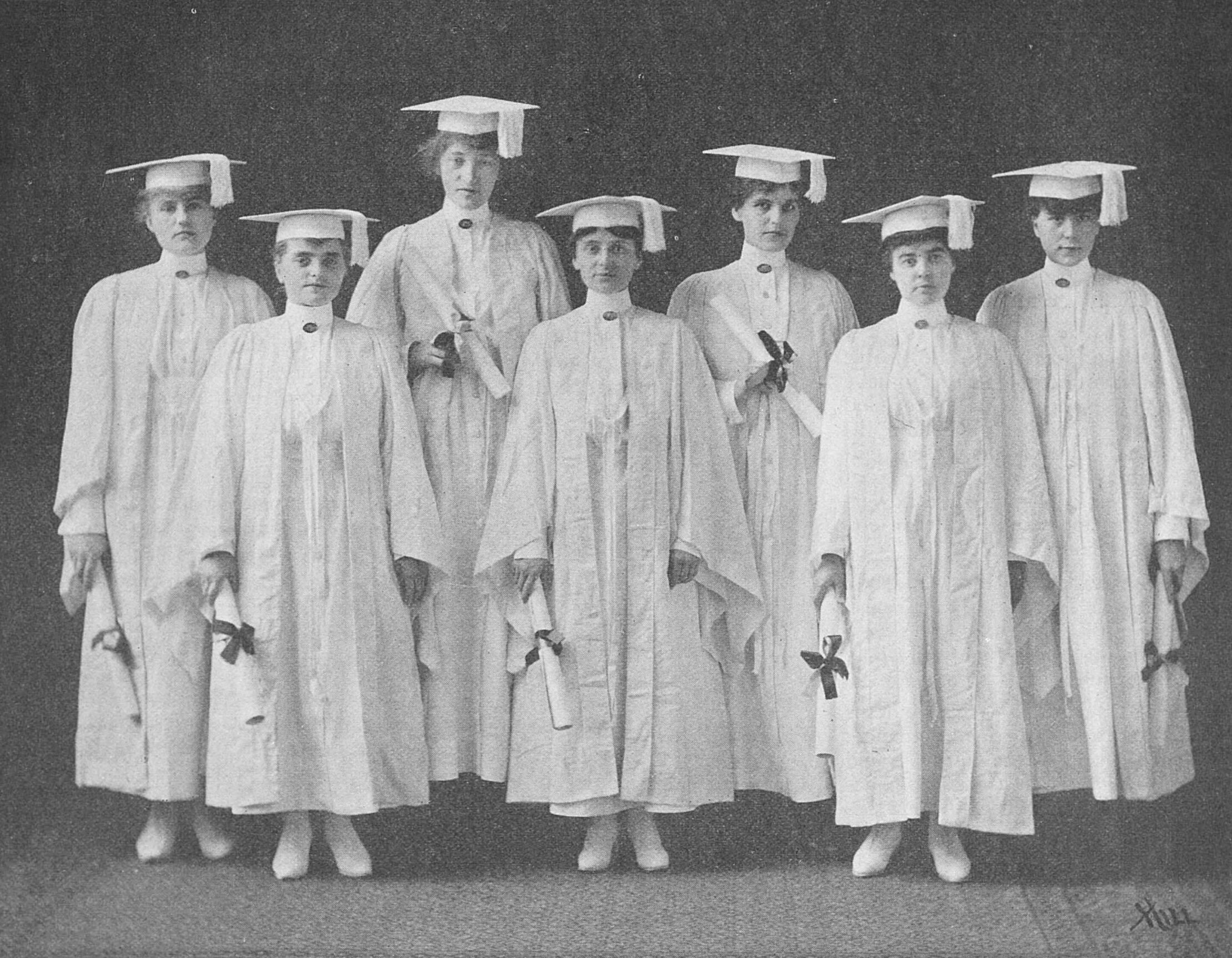
1918 graduates of St. Raphael's Training School for Nurses

In 1907, a new state law required nurses to have certification. In 1908, the sisters opened the School of Nursing at the hospital, and in 1911, the first nurses – five sisters and three lay women – received their first nursing diplomas.

== St. Cloud Hospital ==
In 1916, looking forward to the future expansion of the hospital, the sisters purchased 20 acres (81,000 m^{2}) of the P.J. Fosse farm north of St. Cloud. No thought of building was considered until after World War I. In May 1926, the sisters broke ground for a hospital to accommodate 200 patients. Sr. Julitta Hoppe, one of the first nursing graduates, was administrator of St. Raphael's at the time and oversaw the construction. The formal dedication of the hospital, renamed St. Cloud Hospital, occurred on February 9, 1928.

With the financial crash in 1929, the sisters struggled with the $2 million debt on the St. Cloud Hospital. However, the sisters managed their resources, which included the small stipends of sisters teaching in area schools, to make interest payments on their debt.

In 1962, the sisters relinquished ownership of St. Cloud Hospital, separately incorporating it into a non-profit corporation. Since then, St. Cloud Hospital has remained a Catholic hospital with a faith-based mission to care for the sick as if to Christ himself. In 1975, the Diocese of St. Cloud joined with the sisters in helping to maintain the Catholic character of the hospital. Since 1995, St. Cloud Hospital has operated under the auspices of the local Catholic Church of St. Cloud.
