= Lund Township, Douglas County, Minnesota =

Lund Township, Minnesota
- Township
- Location within the state of Minnesota Lund Township, Minnesota (the United States)
- Coordinates: 46°4′25″N 95°42′40″W
- Country: United States
- State: Minnesota
- County: Douglas

Area
  - Total: 36.0 sq mi (93.3 km^{2})
  - Land: 28.2 sq mi (73.1 km^{2})
  - Water: 7.8 sq mi (20.2 km^{2})
- Elevation: 1,309 ft (399 m)

Population (2000)
  - Total: 355
  - Density: 13/sq mi (4.9/km^{2})
- Time zone: UTC-6 (Central (CST))
  - Summer (DST): UTC-5 (CDT)
- FIPS code: 27-38510
- GNIS feature ID: 0664837
- Website: https://lundtownshipmn.us/

Lund Township is a township in Douglas County, Minnesota, United States. The population was 346 at the 2020 census.

Lund Township was organized in 1872, and named after Lund, Sweden.

== Geography ==
According to the United States Census Bureau, the township has a total area of 36.0 square miles (93.3 km^{2}), of which 28.2 square miles (73.1 km^{2}) is land and 7.8 square miles (20.2 km^{2}) (21.63%) is water.

== Demographics ==
As of the census of 2000, there were 355 people, 129 households, and 94 families residing in the township. The population density was 12.6 inhabitants per square mile (4.9/km^{2}). There were 199 housing units at an average density of 7.1 per square mile (2.7/km^{2}). The racial makeup of the township was 99.15% White, and 0.85% from two or more races. Hispanic or Latino of any race were 0.28% of the population.

There were 129 households, out of which 35.7% had children under the age of 18 living with them, 64.3% were married couples living together, 4.7% had a female householder with no husband present, and 26.4% were non-families. 22.5% of all households were made up of individuals, and 8.5% had someone living alone who was 65 years of age or older. The average household size was 2.69 and the average family size was 3.15.

In the township the population was spread out, with 29.3% under the age of 18, 9.6% from 18 to 24, 23.9% from 25 to 44, 24.8% from 45 to 64, and 12.4% who were 65 years of age or older. The median age was 38 years. For every 100 females, there were 110.1 males. For every 100 females age 18 and over, there were 118.3 males.

The median income for a household in the township was $40,417, and the median income for a family was $41,429. Males had a median income of $30,455 versus $16,563 for females. The per capita income for the township was $15,567. About 3.8% of families and 5.9% of the population were below the poverty line, including 7.5% of those under age 18 and 9.1% of those age 65 or over.
