= Brandon, Minnesota =

City in Minnesota, United States

Brandon
- City
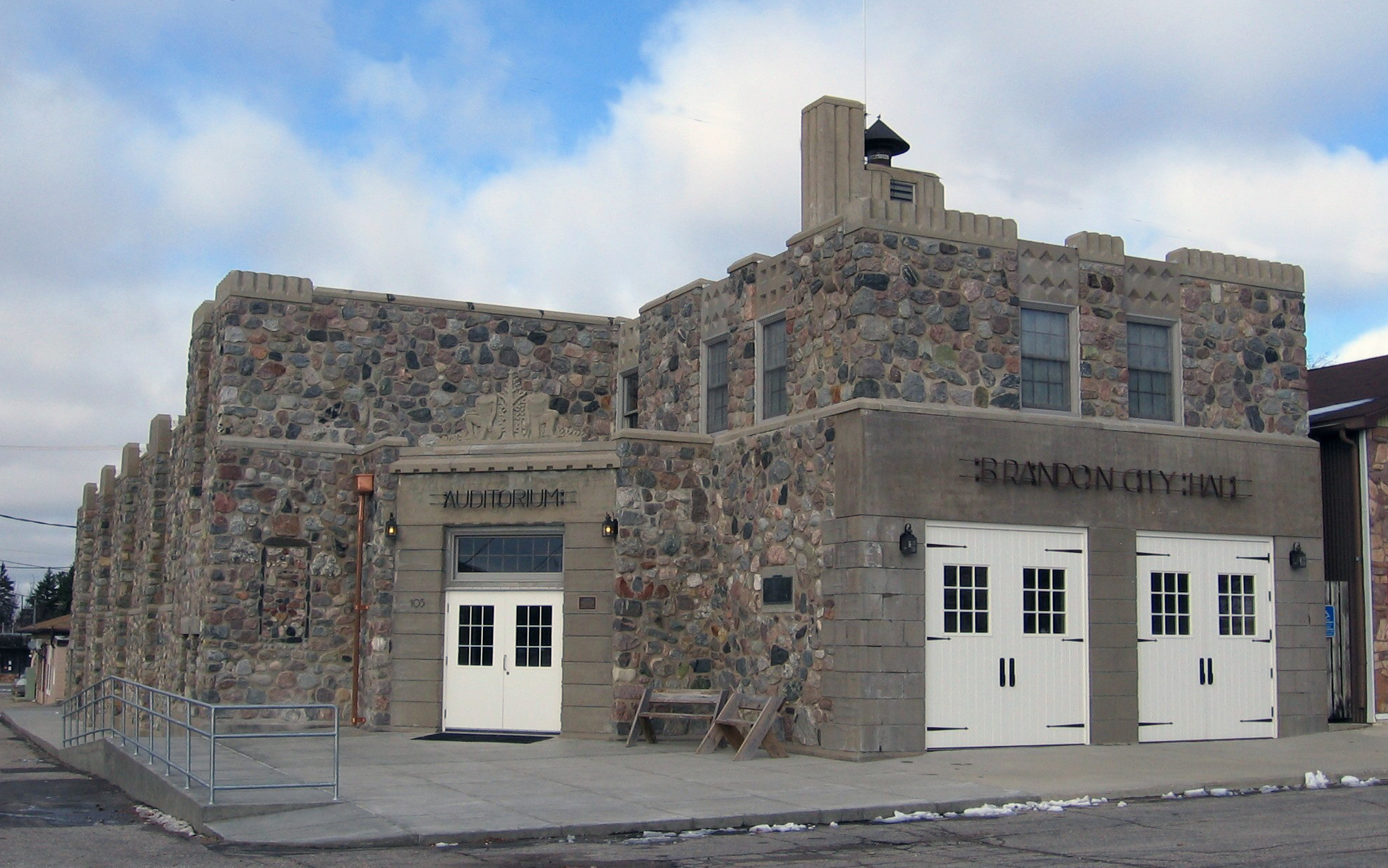
- Brandon Auditorium and City Hall
- Motto: "Great Today, Greater Tomorrow!"
- Location of Brandon within Douglas County and state of Minnesota
- Coordinates: 45°57′59″N 95°35′40″W
- Country: United States
- State: Minnesota
- County: Douglas

Government
  - Mayor: Roger Campbell

Area
  - Total: 0.49 sq mi (1.27 km^{2})
  - Land: 0.48 sq mi (1.25 km^{2})
  - Water: 0.0077 sq mi (0.02 km^{2})
- Elevation: 1,398 ft (426 m)

Population (2020)
  - Total: 501
  - Density: 1,038/sq mi (400.8/km^{2})
- Time zone: UTC-6 (Central (CST))
  - Summer (DST): UTC-5 (CDT)
- ZIP code: 56315
- Area code: 320
- FIPS code: 27-07336
- GNIS feature ID: 2394239
- Website: brandonmn.com

Brandon is a city in Douglas County, Minnesota, United States. The population was 501 at the 2020 census.

== History ==
The village of Brandon was incorporated on November 22, 1881. The current town site was laid out when the railroad was being built in August 1879. The town was called Chippewa when at its previous location which was two miles north of the present day site. Brandon was named in honor of Brandon, Vermont, the birthplace of Stephen A. Douglas.

== Government ==
Brandon Township has a township board with 3 elected commissioners and an appointed clerk and appointed treasurer.

== Geography ==
According to the United States Census Bureau, the city has a total area of 0.48 square miles (1.24 km^{2}), of which 0.47 square miles (1.22 km^{2}) is land and 0.01 square miles (0.03 km^{2}) is water.

The city of Brandon is located within Brandon Township geographically but is a separate entity. It is along Interstate 94, and Douglas County Roads 7, 16, and 82.

== Demographics ==
Historical population
| Census | Pop. | Note | %± |
|---|---|---|---|
| 1890 | 225 | | — |
| 1900 | 272 | | 20.9% |
| 1910 | 276 | | 1.5% |
| 1920 | 292 | | 5.8% |
| 1930 | 311 | | 6.5% |
| 1940 | 345 | | 10.9% |
| 1950 | 319 | | −7.5% |
| 1960 | 353 | | 10.7% |
| 1970 | 414 | | 17.3% |
| 1980 | 473 | | 14.3% |
| 1990 | 441 | | −6.8% |
| 2000 | 450 | | 2.0% |
| 2010 | 489 | | 8.7% |
| 2020 | 501 | | 2.5% |
U.S. Decennial Census; 2020 Census

=== 2010 census ===
As of the census of 2010, there were 489 people, 207 households, and 139 families living in the city. The population density was 1,040.4 inhabitants per square mile (401.7/km^{2}). There were 220 housing units at an average density of 468.1 per square mile (180.7/km^{2}). The racial makeup of the city was 99.2% White, 0.2% African American, and 0.6% Native American. Hispanic or Latino of any race were 2.2% of the population.

There were 207 households, of which 29.0% had children under the age of 18 living with them, 54.6% were married couples living together, 10.1% had a female householder with no husband present, 2.4% had a male householder with no wife present, and 32.9% were non-families. 28.5% of all households were made up of individuals, and 6.8% had someone living alone who was 65 years of age or older. The average household size was 2.36 and the average family size was 2.90.

The median age in the city was 34.5 years. 26.4% of residents were under the age of 18; 7.3% were between the ages of 18 and 24; 24.8% were from 25 to 44; 26.3% were from 45 to 64; and 15.3% were 65 years of age or older. The gender makeup of the city was 53.0% male and 47.0% female.

=== 2000 census ===
As of the census of 2000, there were 450 people, 187 households, and 123 families living in the city. The population density was 1,120.2 inhabitants per square mile (432.5/km^{2}). There were 199 housing units at an average density of 495.4 per square mile (191.3/km^{2}). The racial makeup of the city was 99.56% White, 0.22% Asian, and 0.22% from two or more races. Hispanic or Latino of any race were 0.89% of the population.

There were 187 households, out of which 32.6% had children under the age of 18 living with them, 56.1% were married couples living together, 7.5% had a female householder with no husband present, and 33.7% were non-families. 31.0% of all households were made up of individuals, and 11.8% had someone living alone who was 65 years of age or older. The average household size was 2.41 and the average family size was 2.99.

In the city, the population was spread out, with 27.3% under the age of 18, 8.7% from 18 to 24, 23.8% from 25 to 44, 24.4% from 45 to 64, and 15.8% who were 65 years of age or older. The median age was 38 years. For every 100 females, there were 97.4 males. For every 100 females age 18 and over, there were 97.0 males.

The median income for a household in the city was $28,750, and the median income for a family was $38,500. Males had a median income of $26,000 versus $23,750 for females. The per capita income for the city was $15,088. About 6.8% of families and 11.7% of the population were below the poverty line, including 15.4% of those under age 18 and 12.5% of those age 65 or over.
