= Millerville, Minnesota =

City in Minnesota, United States

- City
- Location of Millerville, Minnesota
- Coordinates: 46°04′09″N 95°33′25″W
- Country: United States
- State: Minnesota
- County: Douglas
- Established: November 23, 1867
- Incorporated: September 2, 1903

Government
  - Mayor: Ryan Lehn

Area
  - Total: 0.861 sq mi (2.230 km^{2})
  - Land: 0.861 sq mi (2.230 km^{2})
  - Water: 0 sq mi (0.000 km^{2})
- Elevation: 1,385 ft (422 m)

Population (2020)
  - Total: 100
  - Estimate (2022): 99
  - Density: 116.1/sq mi (44.84/km^{2})
- Time zone: UTC–6 (Central (CST))
  - Summer (DST): UTC–5 (CDT)
- ZIP Code: 56315
- Area code: 320
- FIPS code: 27-42254
- GNIS feature ID: 2395330

Millerville is a city in Douglas County, Minnesota, United States. The population was 100 at the 2020 census.

== Geography ==
According to the United States Census Bureau, the city has a total area of 0.861 square miles (2.23 km^{2}), all land.

== Demographics ==
Historical population
Census	Pop.	Note	%±
1910	150		—
1920	152		1.3%
1930	141		−7.2%
1940	182		29.1%
1950	173		−4.9%
1960	119		−31.2%
1970	109		−8.4%
1980	124		13.8%
1990	104		−16.1%
2000	115		10.6%
2010	106		−7.8%
2020	100		−5.7%
2022 (est.)	99		−1.0%
U.S. Decennial Census; 2020 Census

=== 2010 census ===
As of the 2010 census, there were 106 people, 45 households, and 27 families residing in the city. The population density was 123.3 inhabitants per square mile (47.6/km^{2}). There were 49 housing units at an average density of 57.0 per square mile (22.0/km^{2}). The racial makeup of the city was 99.1% White and 0.9% from two or more races.

There were 45 households, of which 20.0% had children under the age of 18 living with them, 51.1% were married couples living together, 8.9% had a male householder with no wife present, and 40.0% were non-families. 26.7% of all households were made up of individuals, and 11.1% had someone living alone who was 65 years of age or older. The average household size was 2.36 and the average family size was 2.96.

The median age in the city was 40.5 years. 18.9% of residents were under the age of 18; 11.2% were between the ages of 18 and 24; 25.5% were from 25 to 44; 25.4% were from 45 to 64; and 18.9% were 65 years of age or older. The gender makeup of the city was 47.2% male and 52.8% female.

=== 2000 census ===
As of the 2000 census, there were 115 people, 47 households, and 31 families residing in the city. The population density was 131.9 inhabitants per square mile (50.9/km^{2}). There were 54 housing units at an average density of 62.0 per square mile (23.9/km^{2}). The racial makeup of the city was 97.39% caucasian American0.87% Native American, and 1.74% from two or more race

There were 47 households, out of which 27.7% had children under the age of 18 living with them, 57.4% were married couples living together, 4.3% had a female householder with no husband present, and 34.0% were non-families. 29.8% of all households were made up of individuals, and 23.4% had someone living alone who was 65 years of age or older. The average household size was 2.45 and the average family size was 3.03.

In the city, the population was spread out, with 24.3% under the age of 18, 6.1% from 18 to 24, 27.0% from 25 to 44, 22.6% from 45 to 64, and 20.0% who were 65 years of age or older. The median age was 40 years. For every 100 females, there were 91.7 males. For every 100 females age 18 and over, there were 85.1 males.

The median income for a household in the city was $29,063, and the median income for a family was $38,125. Males had a median income of $23,125 versus $17,500 for females. The per capita income for the city was $13,322. There were 6.7% of families and 12.2% of the population living below the poverty line, including 11.4% of under eighteens and 50.0% of those over 64.

== History ==
A post office called Millerville was in operation from 1869 until 1907. The city was named for John Miller, an early settler.
