= Lake Mary (Douglas County, Minnesota) =

Lake in the state of Minnesota, United States

Coordinates: 45°49′36″N 95°28′42″W

- Location within Minnesota
- Location: Douglas County, Minnesota
- Type: Natural freshwater lake
- Basin countries: United States
- Max. length: 3.11 mi (5.01 km)
- Max. width: 1.72 mi (2.77 km)
- Surface area: 2,450.4 acres (991.64 ha)
- Average depth: 17 ft (5.2 m)
- Max. depth: 40 ft (12 m)
- Surface elevation: 1,365 ft (416 m)

Lake Mary is a lake in Douglas County, in the U.S. state of Minnesota.

Lake Mary was named for Mary A. Kinkaid, a pioneer who settled the area in 1861.

== See also ==
- List of lakes in Minnesota
