= Millerville Township, Douglas County, Minnesota =

Millerville Township, Minnesota
- Township
- Location within the state of Minnesota Millerville Township, Minnesota (the United States)
- Coordinates: 46°3′29″N 95°36′26″W
- Country: United States
- State: Minnesota
- County: Douglas

Area
  - Total: 35.3 sq mi (91.3 km^{2})
  - Land: 31.9 sq mi (82.5 km^{2})
  - Water: 3.4 sq mi (8.7 km^{2})
- Elevation: 1,381 ft (421 m)

Population (2000)
  - Total: 350
  - Density: 11/sq mi (4.2/km^{2})
- Time zone: UTC-6 (Central (CST))
  - Summer (DST): UTC-5 (CDT)
- FIPS code: 27-42272
- GNIS feature ID: 0664975
- Website: https://millervilletownship.com/

Millerville Township is a township in Douglas County, Minnesota, United States. The population was 417 at the 2020 census.

Millerville Township was organized in 1867, and named for John Miller, an early settler.

== Geography ==
According to the United States Census Bureau, the township has a total area of 35.2 square miles (91.3 km^{2}), of which 31.9 square miles (82.5 km^{2}) is land and 3.4 square miles (8.7 km^{2}) (9.56%) is water.

== Demographics ==
As of the census of 2000, there were 350 people, 124 households, and 104 families residing in the township. The population density was 11.0 people per square mile (4.2/km^{2}). There were 196 housing units at an average density of 6.1/sq mi (2.4/km^{2}). The racial makeup of the township was 99.71% White and 0.29% Asian.

There were 124 households, out of which 34.7% had children under the age of 18 living with them, 74.2% were married couples living together, 4.0% had a female householder with no husband present, and 16.1% were non-families. 15.3% of all households were made up of individuals, and 6.5% had someone living alone who was 65 years of age or older. The average household size was 2.82 and the average family size was 3.13.

In the township the population was spread out, with 30.0% under the age of 18, 8.6% from 18 to 24, 24.3% from 25 to 44, 23.4% from 45 to 64, and 13.7% who were 65 years of age or older. The median age was 35 years. For every 100 females, there were 110.8 males. For every 100 females age 18 and over, there were 120.7 males.

The median income for a household in the township was $36,500, and the median income for a family was $36,250. Males had a median income of $25,357 versus $19,375 for females. The per capita income for the township was $14,366. About 17.0% of families and 16.3% of the population were below the poverty line, including 23.6% of those under age 18 and 18.8% of those age 65 or over.
