= Lake Reno =

Lake in the state of Minnesota, United States

- Location within Minnesota
- Location: Douglas County and Pope County, Minnesota
- Coordinates: 45°44′23″N 95°25′16″W
- Type: lake

Lake Reno is a lake in the U.S. state of Minnesota.

Lake Reno was named for Jesse L. Reno (1823–1862), an American military general during the Mexican–American War, and the American Civil War.

== See also ==
- List of lakes in Minnesota
