= Reno Township, Pope County, Minnesota =

Reno Township, Minnesota
- Township
- Location within the state of Minnesota Reno Township, Minnesota (the United States)
- Coordinates: 45°42′33″N 95°27′33″W
- Country: United States
- State: Minnesota
- County: Pope

Area
  - Total: 35.9 sq mi (92.9 km^{2})
  - Land: 29.8 sq mi (77.1 km^{2})
  - Water: 6.1 sq mi (15.8 km^{2})
- Elevation: 1,398 ft (426 m)

Population (2000)
  - Total: 355
  - Density: 12/sq mi (4.6/km^{2})
- Time zone: UTC-6 (Central (CST))
  - Summer (DST): UTC-5 (CDT)
- FIPS code: 27-53854
- GNIS feature ID: 0665399

Reno Township is a township in Pope County, Minnesota, United States. The population was 431 at the 2020 census.

Reno Township took its name from Lake Reno.

== Geography ==
According to the United States Census Bureau, the township has a total area of 35.9 square miles (92.9 km^{2}), of which 29.8 square miles (77.1 km^{2}) is land and 6.1 square miles (15.8 km^{2}) (16.98%) is water.

== Demographics ==
As of the census of 2000, there were 355 people, 125 households, and 100 families residing in the township. The population density was 11.9 people per square mile (4.6/km^{2}). There were 162 housing units at an average density of 5.4/sq mi (2.1/km^{2}). The racial makeup of the township was 99.15% White, 0.28% Native American, 0.28% Asian, and 0.28% from two or more races.

There were 125 households, out of which 39.2% had children under the age of 18 living with them, 74.4% were married couples living together, 3.2% had a female householder with no husband present, and 20.0% were non-families. 16.8% of all households were made up of individuals, and 7.2% had someone living alone who was 65 years of age or older. The average household size was 2.84 and the average family size was 3.22.

In the township the population was spread out, with 28.2% under the age of 18, 7.6% from 18 to 24, 23.9% from 25 to 44, 29.6% from 45 to 64, and 10.7% who were 65 years of age or older. The median age was 38 years. For every 100 females, there were 121.9 males. For every 100 females age 18 and over, there were 117.9 males.

The median income for a household in the township was $48,000, and the median income for a family was $54,000. Males had a median income of $28,750 versus $20,000 for females. The per capita income for the township was $15,518. About 10.6% of families and 10.6% of the population were below the poverty line, including 9.3% of those under age 18 and 21.4% of those age 65 or over.
