= Lake Mary Township, Douglas County, Minnesota =

Lake Mary Township, Minnesota
- Township
- Location within the state of Minnesota Lake Mary Township, Minnesota (the United States)
- Coordinates: 45°48′29″N 95°27′5″W
- Country: United States
- State: Minnesota
- County: Douglas

Area
  - Total: 35.2 sq mi (91.1 km^{2})
  - Land: 28.7 sq mi (74.4 km^{2})
  - Water: 6.4 sq mi (16.7 km^{2})
- Elevation: 1,371 ft (418 m)

Population (2000)
  - Total: 997
  - Density: 35/sq mi (13.4/km^{2})
- Time zone: UTC-6 (Central (CST))
  - Summer (DST): UTC-5 (CDT)
- FIPS code: 27-34730
- GNIS feature ID: 0664690
- Website: https://lakemarytwpmn.govoffice2.com/

Lake Mary Township is a township in Douglas County, Minnesota, United States. The population was 1,158 at the 2020 census.

== History ==
Lake Mary Township was organized in 1867, and took its name from the Lake Mary within its borders.

== Geography ==
According to the United States Census Bureau, the township has a total area of 35.2 square miles (91 km^{2}), of which 28.7 square miles (74 km^{2}) is land and 6.5 square miles (17 km^{2}) (18.36%) is water.

== Demographics ==
As of the census of 2000, there were 997 people, 362 households, and 309 families residing in the township. The population density was 34.7 inhabitants per square mile (13.4/km^{2}). There were 491 housing units at an average density of 17.1 per square mile (6.6/km^{2}). The racial makeup of the township was 99.80% White, 0.10% Native American and 0.10% Asian. Hispanic or Latino of any race were 0.20% of the population.

There were 362 households, out of which 36.7% had children under the age of 18 living with them, 79.6% were married couples living together, 3.0% had a female householder with no husband present, and 14.6% were non-families. 11.3% of all households were made up of individuals, and 6.1% had someone living alone who was 65 years of age or older. The average household size was 2.75 and the average family size was 2.98.

In the township the population was spread out, with 27.3% under the age of 18, 5.3% from 18 to 24, 26.0% from 25 to 44, 27.4% from 45 to 64, and 14.0% who were 65 years of age or older. The median age was 39 years. For every 100 females, there were 110.8 males. For every 100 females age 18 and over, there were 105.4 males.

The median income for a household in the township was $45,515, and the median income for a family was $47,500. Males had a median income of $34,044 versus $22,163 for females. The per capita income for the township was $19,621. About 3.5% of families and 3.4% of the population were below the poverty line, including 2.5% of those under age 18 and 9.0% of those age 65 or over.
