= Miltona, Minnesota =

City in Minnesota, United States

Miltona
- City
- Location of Miltona, Minnesota
- Coordinates: 46°02′47″N 95°17′36″W
- Country: United States
- State: Minnesota
- County: Douglas

Area
  - Total: 0.67 sq mi (1.74 km^{2})
  - Land: 0.67 sq mi (1.74 km^{2})
  - Water: 0 sq mi (0.00 km^{2})
- Elevation: 1,398 ft (426 m)

Population (2020)
  - Total: 431
  - Density: 642.0/sq mi (247.88/km^{2})
- Time zone: UTC-6 (Central (CST))
  - Summer (DST): UTC-5 (CDT)
- ZIP code: 56354
- Area code: 218
- FIPS code: 27-42398
- GNIS feature ID: 2395336
- Website: https://miltona.org/

Miltona is a city in Douglas County, Minnesota, United States. The population was 431 at the 2020 census.

== History ==
A post office called Miltona has been in operation since 1873. The city was named after Lake Miltona.

On July 18, 1970, a tornado hit Miltona, destroying or damaging 11 homes, 15 businesses and several farms, leaving a path of destruction that was a block and a half wide and three miles long.

== Geography ==
According to the United States Census Bureau, the city has a total area of 0.67 square miles (1.74 km^{2}), all land.

Minnesota State Highway 29 and County Highway 14 are two of the main routes in the community.

== Demographics ==
Historical population
Census	Pop.	Note	%±
1930	89		—
1940	116		30.3%
1950	150		29.3%
1960	163		8.7%
1970	172		5.5%
1980	187		8.7%
1990	181		−3.2%
2000	279		54.1%
2010	424		52.0%
2020	431		1.7%
U.S. Decennial Census; 2020 Census

=== 2010 census ===
As of the census of 2010, there were 424 people, 165 households, and 112 families living in the city. The population density was 632.8 inhabitants per square mile (244.3/km^{2}). There were 184 housing units at an average density of 274.6 per square mile (106.0/km^{2}). The racial makeup of the city was 99.3% White, 0.2% African American, 0.2% Native American, and 0.2% from two or more races. Hispanic or Latino of any race were 1.2% of the population.

There were 165 households, of which 39.4% had children under the age of 18 living with them, 50.9% were married couples living together, 10.9% had a female householder with no husband present, 6.1% had a male householder with no wife present, and 32.1% were non-families. 24.8% of all households were made up of individuals, and 11.5% had someone living alone who was 65 years of age or older. The average household size was 2.57 and the average family size was 3.06.

The median age in the city was 30.2 years. 30.4% of residents were under the age of 18; 8.8% were between the ages of 18 and 24; 28.6% were from 25 to 44; 18.5% were from 45 to 64; and 13.7% were 65 years of age or older. The gender makeup of the city was 51.4% male and 48.6% female.

=== 2000 census ===
As of the census of 2000, there were 279 people, 117 households, and 78 families living in the city. The population density was 525.3 inhabitants per square mile (202.8/km^{2}). There were 123 housing units at an average density of 231.6 per square mile (89.4/km^{2}). The racial makeup of the city was 98.92% White, 0.72% Native American, 0.36% from other races. Hispanic or Latino of any race were 0.72% of the population.

There were 117 households, out of which 34.2% had children under the age of 18 living with them, 53.8% were married couples living together, 11.1% had a female householder with no husband present, and 33.3% were non-families. 29.9% of all households were made up of individuals, and 16.2% had someone living alone who was 65 years of age or older. The average household size was 2.38 and the average family size was 2.90.

In the city, the population was spread out, with 29.0% under the age of 18, 8.2% from 18 to 24, 30.5% from 25 to 44, 15.1% from 45 to 64, and 17.2% who were 65 years of age or older. The median age was 31 years. For every 100 females, there were 111.4 males. For every 100 females age 18 and over, there were 100.0 males.

The median income for a household in the city was $28,333, and the median income for a family was $38,958. Males had a median income of $27,708 versus $19,583 for females. The per capita income for the city was $13,845. About 13.8% of families and 20.2% of the population were below the poverty line, including 31.5% of those under the age of eighteen and 14.8% of those 65 or over.
