= Nelson, Minnesota =

City in Minnesota, United States

Nelson
- City
- Location of Nelson, Minnesota
- Coordinates: 45°53′12″N 95°15′54″W
- Country: United States
- State: Minnesota
- County: Douglas

Area
  - Total: 0.66 sq mi (1.71 km^{2})
  - Land: 0.66 sq mi (1.71 km^{2})
  - Water: 0 sq mi (0.00 km^{2})
- Elevation: 1,368 ft (417 m)

Population (2020)
  - Total: 182
  - Density: 275.2/sq mi (106.25/km^{2})
- Time zone: UTC-6 (Central (CST))
  - Summer (DST): UTC-5 (CDT)
- ZIP code: 56355
- Area code: 320
- FIPS code: 27-45106
- GNIS feature ID: 2395165
- Website: https://www.cityofnelsonmn.com/

Nelson is a city in Douglas County, Minnesota, United States. The population was 182 at the 2020 census.

== History ==
Nelson was originally called Dent, after settler Richard Dent, and under the latter name was founded circa 1875. The present name is for Knute Nelson, a prominent citizen and United States Senator from Minnesota. A post office was established as Dent in 1880, and in 1881 the name was changed to Nelson.

== Geography ==
According to the United States Census Bureau, the city has a total area of 0.66 square miles (1.71 km^{2}), all land.

Minnesota State Highway 27 serves as a main route in the community.

== Demographics ==
Historical population
Census	Pop.	Note	%±
1910	157		—
1920	159		1.3%
1930	147		−7.5%
1940	159		8.2%
1950	160		0.6%
1960	150		−6.2%
1970	175		16.7%
1980	209		19.4%
1990	177		−15.3%
2000	172		−2.8%
2010	187		8.7%
2020	182		−2.7%
U.S. Decennial Census; 2020 Census

=== 2010 census ===
As of the census of 2010, there were 187 people, 84 households, and 45 families living in the city. The population density was 283.3 inhabitants per square mile (109.4/km^{2}). There were 92 housing units at an average density of 139.4 per square mile (53.8/km^{2}). The racial makeup of the city was 98.9% White and 1.1% Native American. Hispanic or Latino of any race were 0.5% of the population.

There were 84 households, of which 25.0% had children under the age of 18 living with them, 38.1% were married couples living together, 11.9% had a female householder with no husband present, 3.6% had a male householder with no wife present, and 46.4% were non-families. 32.1% of all households were made up of individuals, and 9.6% had someone living alone who was 65 years of age or older. The average household size was 2.23 and the average family size was 2.84.

The median age in the city was 38.8 years. 20.3% of residents were under the age of 18; 11.3% were between the ages of 18 and 24; 29.5% were from 25 to 44; 26.2% were from 45 to 64; and 12.8% were 65 years of age or older. The gender makeup of the city was 54.0% male and 46.0% female.

=== 2000 census ===
As of the census of 2000, there were 172 people, 73 households, and 44 families living in the city. The population density was 235.8 inhabitants per square mile (91.0/km^{2}). There were 76 housing units at an average density of 104.2 per square mile (40.2/km^{2}). The racial makeup of the city was 98.26% White, 1.16% Native American, and 0.58% from two or more races. Hispanic or Latino of any race were 0.58% of the population.

There were 73 households, out of which 24.7% had children under the age of 18 living with them, 50.7% were married couples living together, 6.8% had a female householder with no husband present, and 38.4% were non-families. 28.8% of all households were made up of individuals, and 5.5% had someone living alone who was 65 years of age or older. The average household size was 2.36 and the average family size was 2.96.

In the city, the population was spread out, with 23.8% under the age of 18, 11.6% from 18 to 24, 32.0% from 25 to 44, 22.7% from 45 to 64, and 9.9% who were 65 years of age or older. The median age was 35 years. For every 100 females, there were 120.5 males. For every 100 females age 18 and over, there were 114.8 males.

The median income for a household in the city was $34,375, and the median income for a family was $35,694. Males had a median income of $26,964 versus $28,438 for females. The per capita income for the city was $13,419. About 22.0% of families and 23.1% of the population were below the poverty line, including 35.6% of those under the age of eighteen and 8.7% of those 65 or over.
