= Carlos Township, Douglas County, Minnesota =

Carlos Township, Minnesota
- Township
- Location within the state of Minnesota Carlos Township, Minnesota (the United States)
- Coordinates: 45°58′34″N 95°20′17″W
- Country: United States
- State: Minnesota
- County: Douglas

Area
  - Total: 35.4 sq mi (91.6 km^{2})
  - Land: 30.1 sq mi (78.0 km^{2})
  - Water: 5.3 sq mi (13.6 km^{2})
- Elevation: 1,362 ft (415 m)

Population (2000)
  - Total: 1,912
  - Density: 63/sq mi (24.5/km^{2})
- Time zone: UTC-6 (Central (CST))
  - Summer (DST): UTC-5 (CDT)
- ZIP code: 56319
- Area code: 320
- FIPS code: 27-09982
- GNIS feature ID: 0663752
- Website: https://carlostownship.org/

Carlos Township is a township in Douglas County, Minnesota, United States. The population was 2,221 at the 2020 census.

Carlos Township was organized in 1868, and named after Lake Carlos.

== Geography ==
According to the United States Census Bureau, the township has a total area of 35.4 square miles (92 km^{2}), of which 30.1 square miles (78 km^{2}) is land and 5.3 square miles (14 km^{2}) (14.90%) is water.

== Demographics ==
As of the census of 2000, there were 1,912 people, 710 households, and 560 families residing in the township. The population density was 63.5 inhabitants per square mile (24.5/km^{2}). There were 1,062 housing units at an average density of 35.3 per square mile (13.6/km^{2}). The racial makeup of the township was 98.06% White, 0.05% African American, 0.26% Native American, 0.78% Asian, 0.42% from other races, and 0.42% from two or more races. Hispanic or Latino of any race were 1.31% of the population.

There were 710 households, out of which 36.6% had children under the age of 18 living with them, 74.6% were married couples living together, 2.5% had a female householder with no husband present, and 21.0% were non-families. 17.0% of all households were made up of individuals, and 7.5% had someone living alone who was 65 years of age or older. The average household size was 2.69 and the average family size was 3.07.

In the township the population was spread out, with 28.0% under the age of 18, 4.8% from 18 to 24, 27.3% from 25 to 44, 25.8% from 45 to 64, and 14.1% who were 65 years of age or older. The median age was 39 years. For every 100 females, there were 106.5 males. For every 100 females age 18 and over, there were 106.6 males.

The median income for a household in the township was $53,009, and the median income for a family was $57,841. Males had a median income of $40,417 versus $24,044 for females. The per capita income for the township was $23,282. About 2.6% of families and 3.9% of the population were below the poverty line, including 3.4% of those under age 18 and 4.4% of those age 65 or over.
