= Hudson Township, Douglas County, Minnesota =

Hudson Township, Minnesota
- Township
- Location within the state of Minnesota Hudson Township, Minnesota (the United States)
- Coordinates: 45°48′8″N 95°20′27″W
- Country: United States
- State: Minnesota
- County: Douglas

Area
  - Total: 35.1 sq mi (90.9 km^{2})
  - Land: 33.1 sq mi (85.7 km^{2})
  - Water: 2.0 sq mi (5.2 km^{2})
- Elevation: 1,401 ft (427 m)

Population (2000)
  - Total: 686
  - Density: 21/sq mi (8/km^{2})
- Time zone: UTC-6 (Central (CST))
  - Summer (DST): UTC-5 (CDT)
- FIPS code: 27-30374
- GNIS feature ID: 0664527

Hudson Township is a township in Douglas County, Minnesota, United States. The population was 944 at the 2020 census.

Hudson Township was organized in 1869. A large share of the early settlers being natives of Hudson, Wisconsin caused the name to be selected.

== Geography ==
According to the United States Census Bureau, the township has a total area of 35.1 square miles (91 km^{2}), of which 33.1 square miles (86 km^{2}) is land and 2.0 square miles (5.2 km^{2}) (5.76%) is water.

== Demographics ==
As of the census of 2000, there were 686 people, 267 households, and 197 families residing in the township. The population density was 20.7 inhabitants per square mile (8.0/km^{2}). There were 340 housing units at an average density of 10.3 per square mile (4.0/km^{2}). The racial makeup of the township was 98.10% White, 0.58% Native American, 0.15% Pacific Islander, 0.44% from other races, and 0.73% from two or more races. Hispanic or Latino of any race were 0.44% of the population.

There were 267 households, out of which 29.6% had children under the age of 18 living with them, 66.3% were married couples living together, 3.7% had a female householder with no husband present, and 26.2% were non-families. 21.7% of all households were made up of individuals, and 9.0% had someone living alone who was 65 years of age or older. The average household size was 2.57 and the average family size was 3.01.

In the township the population was spread out, with 23.5% under the age of 18, 9.3% from 18 to 24, 24.1% from 25 to 44, 29.3% from 45 to 64, and 13.8% who were 65 years of age or older. The median age was 41 years. For every 100 females, there were 109.1 males. For every 100 females age 18 and over, there were 116.0 males.

The median income for a household in the township was $40,972, and the median income for a family was $46,458. Males had a median income of $27,232 versus $24,375 for females. The per capita income for the township was $20,897. About 4.3% of families and 5.9% of the population were below the poverty line, including none of those under age 18 and 14.2% of those age 65 or over.
