= Ida Township, Douglas County, Minnesota =

Ida Township, Minnesota
- Township
- Location within the state of Minnesota Ida Township, Minnesota (the United States)
- Coordinates: 45°58′25″N 95°27′1″W
- Country: United States
- State: Minnesota
- County: Douglas

Area
  - Total: 35.6 sq mi (92.2 km^{2})
  - Land: 28.0 sq mi (72.4 km^{2})
  - Water: 7.6 sq mi (19.8 km^{2})
- Elevation: 1,388 ft (423 m)

Population (2000)
  - Total: 1,057
  - Density: 38/sq mi (14.6/km^{2})
- Time zone: UTC-6 (Central (CST))
  - Summer (DST): UTC-5 (CDT)
- FIPS code: 27-30716
- GNIS feature ID: 0664539
- Website: https://idatownship.com/

Ida Township is a township in Douglas County, Minnesota, United States. The population was 1,404 at the 2020 census.

== Geography ==
According to the United States Census Bureau, the township has a total area of 35.6 square miles (92 km^{2}), of which 27.9 square miles (72 km^{2}) is land and 7.6 square miles (20 km^{2}) (21.47%) is water.

Within Ida Township is Lake Ida, a nearly 4,500-acre (18 km^{2}) lake with a maximum depth of 104 feet (32 m) and 21.2 miles (34.1 km) of shoreline. Fishermen love it for walleyes and Northern Pike along with Largemouth and Smallmouth Bass.

== Demographics ==
At the 2000 census, there were 1,057 people, 422 households and 332 families residing in the township. The population density was 37.8 inhabitants per square mile (14.6/km^{2}). There were 838 housing units at an average density of 30.0 per square mile (11.6/km^{2}). The racial makeup of the township was 98.20% White, 0.09% Native American, 0.19% Asian, 0.66% from other races, and 0.85% from two or more races. Hispanic or Latino of any race were 0.85% of the population.

There were 422 households, of which 25.8% had children under the age of 18 living with them, 73.0% were married couples living together, 3.8% had a female householder with no husband present, and 21.3% were non-families. 17.8% of all households were made up of individuals, and 6.9% had someone living alone who was 65 years of age or older. The average household size was 2.50 and the average family size was 2.83.

22.4% of the population were under the age of 18, 4.9% from 18 to 24, 23.4% from 25 to 44, 31.3% from 45 to 64, and 18.0% who were 65 years of age or older. The median age was 45 years. For every 100 females, there were 111.0 males. For every 100 females age 18 and over, there were 105.0 males.

The median household income was $45,208 and the median family income was $51,528. Males had a median income of $29,559 compared with $22,885 for females. The per capita income for the township was $19,221. About 2.3% of families and 5.1% of the population were below the poverty line, including 5.9% of those under age 18 and 8.6% of those age 65 or over.
