= Belle River Township, Douglas County, Minnesota =

Belle River Township, Minnesota
- Township
- Location within the state of Minnesota Belle River Township, Minnesota (the United States)
- Coordinates: 45°59′14″N 95°12′20″W
- Country: United States
- State: Minnesota
- County: Douglas

Area
  - Total: 35.9 sq mi (93.1 km^{2})
  - Land: 35.8 sq mi (92.6 km^{2})
  - Water: 0.19 sq mi (0.5 km^{2})
- Elevation: 1,352 ft (412 m)

Population (2000)
  - Total: 350
  - Density: 9.8/sq mi (3.8/km^{2})
- Time zone: UTC-6 (Central (CST))
  - Summer (DST): UTC-5 (CDT)
- FIPS code: 27-04924
- GNIS feature ID: 0663558

Belle River Township is a township in Douglas County, Minnesota, United States. The population was 341 at the 2020 census.

Belle River Township was organized in 1870. Belle is derived from the French meaning "beautiful".

== Geography ==
According to the United States Census Bureau, the township has a total area of 36.0 square miles (93 km^{2}), of which 35.8 square miles (93 km^{2}) is land and 0.2 square miles (0.52 km^{2}) (0.53%) is water.

== Demographics ==
As of the census of 2000, there were 350 people, 129 households, and 103 families residing in the township. The population density was 9.8 inhabitants per square mile (3.8/km^{2}). There were 141 housing units at an average density of 3.9 per square mile (1.5/km^{2}). The racial makeup of the township was 99.43% White, 0.29% African American, and 0.29% from two or more races. Hispanic or Latino of any race were 1.43% of the population.

There were 129 households, out of which 32.6% had children under the age of 18 living with them, 76.0% were married couples living together, 0.8% had a female householder with no husband present, and 19.4% were non-families. 15.5% of all households were made up of individuals, and 5.4% had someone living alone who was 65 years of age or older. The average household size was 2.71 and the average family size was 3.05.

In the township the population was spread out, with 24.0% under the age of 18, 8.0% from 18 to 24, 31.1% from 25 to 44, 25.7% from 45 to 64, and 11.1% who were 65 years of age or older. The median age was 39 years. For every 100 females, there were 116.0 males. For every 100 females age 18 and over, there were 129.3 males.

The median income for a household in the township was $36,875, and the median income for a family was $36,875. Males had a median income of $27,708 versus $26,250 for females. The per capita income for the township was $14,630. About 5.5% of families and 8.4% of the population were below the poverty line, including 13.0% of those under age 18 and none of those age 65 or over.
