= Lake Miltona =

Lake in the state of Minnesota, United States

- Location within Minnesota
- Location: Douglas County, Minnesota
- Coordinates: 46°2′27″N 95°22′7″W
- Type: lake

Lake Miltona is a lake in Douglas County, in the U.S. state of Minnesota.

Lake Miltona was named for Florence Miltona Roadruck, the wife of a pioneer who settled there.

== See also ==
- List of lakes in Minnesota
