= Forada, Minnesota =

City in Minnesota, United States

Forada
- City
- Location of Forada, Minnesota
- Coordinates: 45°47′19″N 95°21′26″W
- Country: United States
- State: Minnesota
- County: Douglas

Area
  - Total: 0.54 sq mi (1.41 km^{2})
  - Land: 0.54 sq mi (1.39 km^{2})
  - Water: 0.0077 sq mi (0.02 km^{2})
- Elevation: 1,417 ft (432 m)

Population (2020)
  - Total: 170
  - Density: 316.4/sq mi (122.18/km^{2})
- Time zone: UTC-6 (Central (CST))
  - Summer (DST): UTC-5 (CDT)
- ZIP code: 56308
- FIPS code: 27-21608
- GNIS feature ID: 2394784
- Website: foradacity.com

Forada is a city in Douglas County, Minnesota, United States. The population was 170 at the 2020 census.

== History ==
Forada was platted in 1903, and named for Ada Campbell, the founder's wife. A post office was established at Forada in 1904, and remained in operation until it was discontinued in 1954. A Presbyterian church was built in Forada in 1905.

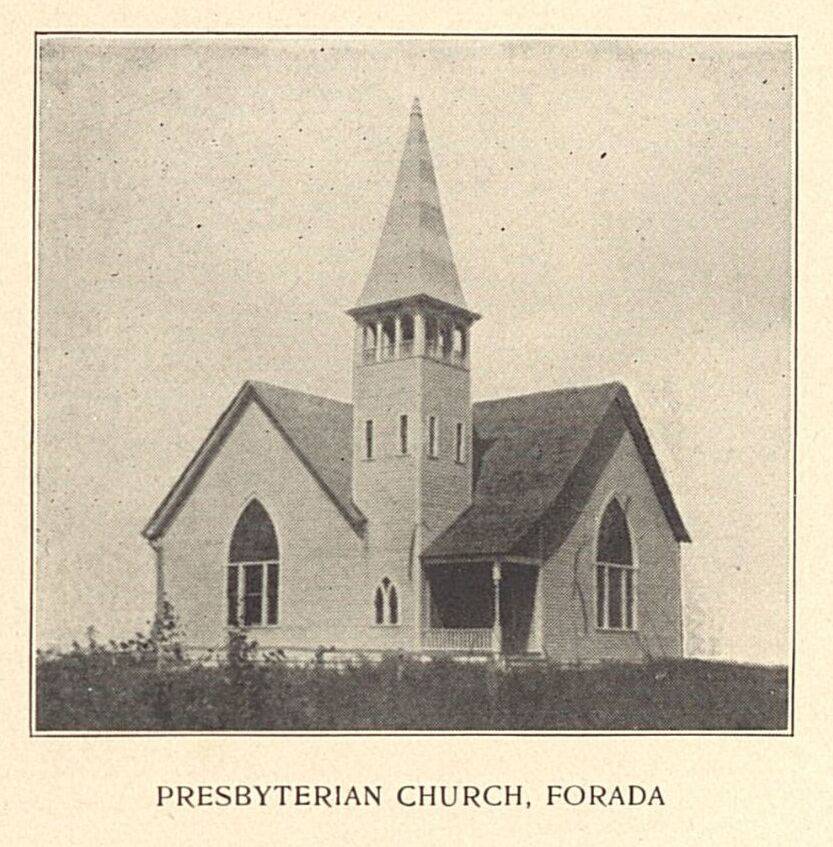
Presbyterian Church, Forada

On May 30, 2022, an EF2 tornado struck the town, severely damaging several homes and businesses.

== Geography ==
According to the United States Census Bureau, the city has a total area of 0.55 square miles (1.42 km^{2}), of which 0.54 square miles (1.40 km^{2}) is land and 0.01 square miles (0.03 km^{2}) is water.

Minnesota State Highway 29 and County Highway 4 are two of the main routes in the community.

== Demographics ==
Historical population
Census	Pop.	Note	%±
1910	66		—
1920	92		39.4%
1930	91		−1.1%
1940	96		5.5%
1950	89		−7.3%
1960	98		10.1%
1970	158		61.2%
1980	191		20.9%
1990	171		−10.5%
2000	197		15.2%
2010	185		−6.1%
2020	170		−8.1%
U.S. Decennial Census; 2020 Census

=== 2010 census ===
As of the census of 2010, there were 185 people, 82 households, and 58 families residing in the city. The population density was 342.6 inhabitants per square mile (132.3/km^{2}). There were 125 housing units at an average density of 231.5 per square mile (89.4/km^{2}). The racial makeup of the city was 97.8% White, 0.5% Asian, and 1.6% from two or more races. Hispanic or Latino of any race were 1.1% of the population.

There were 82 households, of which 23.2% had children under the age of 18 living with them, 56.1% were married couples living together, 12.2% had a female householder with no husband present, 2.4% had a male householder with no wife present, and 29.3% were non-families. 19.5% of all households were made up of individuals, and 6.1% had someone living alone who was 65 years of age or older. The average household size was 2.26 and the average family size was 2.52.

The median age in the city was 50.8 years. 17.3% of residents were under the age of 18; 4.3% were between the ages of 18 and 24; 21.1% were from 25 to 44; 31.4% were from 45 to 64; and 25.9% were 65 years of age or older. The gender makeup of the city was 49.2% male and 50.8% female.

=== 2000 census ===
As of the census of 2000, there were 197 people, 82 households, and 63 families residing in the city. The population density was 370.5 inhabitants per square mile (143.1/km^{2}). There were 118 housing units at an average density of 221.9 per square mile (85.7/km^{2}). The racial makeup of the city was 100.00% White.

There were 82 households, out of which 25.6% had children under the age of 18 living with them, 63.4% were married couples living together, 11.0% had a female householder with no husband present, and 22.0% were non-families. 14.6% of all households were made up of individuals, and 7.3% had someone living alone who was 65 years of age or older. The average household size was 2.40 and the average family size was 2.63.

In the city, the population was spread out, with 20.8% under the age of 18, 6.6% from 18 to 24, 29.4% from 25 to 44, 27.4% from 45 to 64, and 15.7% who were 65 years of age or older. The median age was 43 years. For every 100 females, there were 99.0 males. For every 100 females age 18 and over, there were 92.6 males.

The median income for a household in the city was $33,393, and the median income for a family was $34,286. Males had a median income of $23,750 versus $20,625 for females. The per capita income for the city was $16,736. About 7.4% of families and 5.4% of the population were below the poverty line, including 12.5% of those under the age of eighteen and none of those 65 or over.
