= Moe Township, Douglas County, Minnesota =

Moe Township, Minnesota
- Township
- Location within the state of Minnesota Moe Township, Minnesota (the United States)
- Coordinates: 45°52′52″N 95°33′36″W
- Country: United States
- State: Minnesota
- County: Douglas

Area
  - Total: 35.9 sq mi (93.0 km^{2})
  - Land: 30.3 sq mi (78.5 km^{2})
  - Water: 5.6 sq mi (14.5 km^{2})
- Elevation: 1,371 ft (418 m)

Population (2000)
  - Total: 683
  - Density: 23/sq mi (8.7/km^{2})
- Time zone: UTC-6 (Central (CST))
  - Summer (DST): UTC-5 (CDT)
- FIPS code: 27-43558
- GNIS feature ID: 0665005
- Website: https://www.moetownshipmn.gov/

Moe Township is a township in Douglas County, Minnesota, United States. The population was 763 at the 2020 census.

== History ==
Moe Township was organized in 1867 and named after a place in Norway.

== Geography ==
According to the United States Census Bureau, the township has a total area of 35.9 square miles (93.0 km^{2}), of which 30.3 square miles (78.6 km^{2}) is land and 5.6 square miles (14.5 km^{2}) (15.54%) is water.

== Demographics ==
As of the census of 2000, there were 683 people, 269 households, and 229 families residing in the township. The population density was 22.5 people per square mile (8.7/km^{2}). There were 434 housing units at an average density of 14.3/sq mi (5.5/km^{2}). The racial makeup of the township was 99.85% White, and 0.15% from two or more races. Hispanic or Latino of any race were 0.29% of the population.

There were 269 households, out of which 26.4% had children under the age of 18 living with them, 79.9% were married couples living together, 3.7% had a female householder with no husband present, and 14.5% were non-families. 13.0% of all households were made up of individuals, and 4.8% had someone living alone who was 65 years of age or older. The average household size was 2.54 and the average family size was 2.77.

In the township, the population was spread out, with 22.3% under the age of 18, 5.3% from 18 to 24, 22.8% from 25 to 44, 35.3% from 45 to 64, and 14.3% who were 65 years of age or older. The median age was 45 years. For every 100 females, there were 101.5 males. For every 100 females age 18 and over, there were 97.4 males.

The median income for a household in the township was $43,828, and the median income for a family was $45,125. Males had a median income of $35,441 versus $20,625 for females. The per capita income for the township was $19,917. About 2.7% of families and 4.9% of the population were below the poverty line, including 7.0% of those under age 18 and 4.1% of those age 65 or over.
