= Brandon Township, Douglas County, Minnesota =

Brandon Township, Minnesota
- Township
- Location within the state of Minnesota Brandon Township, Minnesota (the United States)
- Coordinates: 45°58′51″N 95°35′35″W
- Country: United States
- State: Minnesota
- County: Douglas

Area
  - Total: 35.6 sq mi (92.1 km^{2})
  - Land: 30.4 sq mi (78.8 km^{2})
  - Water: 5.1 sq mi (13.3 km^{2})
- Elevation: 1,424 ft (434 m)

Population (2000)
  - Total: 641
  - Density: 21/sq mi (8.1/km^{2})
- Time zone: UTC-6 (Central (CST))
  - Summer (DST): UTC-5 (CDT)
- ZIP code: 56315
- Area code: 320
- FIPS code: 27-07354
- GNIS feature ID: 0663652
- Website: https://brandontownship.org/

Brandon Township is a township in Douglas County, Minnesota, United States. The population was 763 at the 2020 census.

Brandon Township was organized in 1867. It took its name from the settlement of Brandon, Minnesota.

== Geography ==
According to the United States Census Bureau, the township has a total area of 35.6 square miles (92 km^{2}), of which 30.4 square miles (79 km^{2}) is land and 5.2 square miles (13 km^{2}) (14.48%) is water.

== Demographics ==
As of the census of 2000, there were 641 people, 249 households, and 199 families residing in the township. The population density was 21.1 inhabitants per square mile (8.1/km^{2}). There were 406 housing units at an average density of 13.4 per square mile (5.2/km^{2}). The racial makeup of the township was 97.66% White, 0.16% Native American, 1.40% Asian, and 0.78% from two or more races. Hispanic or Latino of any race were 0.31% of the population.

There were 249 households, out of which 30.1% had children under the age of 18 living with them, 75.9% were married couples living together, 1.6% had a female householder with no husband present, and 19.7% were non-families. 16.1% of all households were made up of individuals, and 7.6% had someone living alone who was 65 years of age or older. The average household size was 2.57 and the average family size was 2.88.

In the township the population was spread out, with 22.8% under the age of 18, 6.9% from 18 to 24, 24.0% from 25 to 44, 32.6% from 45 to 64, and 13.7% who were 65 years of age or older. The median age was 43 years. For every 100 females, there were 104.8 males. For every 100 females age 18 and over, there were 104.5 males.

The median income for a household in the township was $44,875, and the median income for a family was $46,979. Males had a median income of $30,789 versus $21,544 for females. The per capita income for the township was $21,735. About 4.8% of families and 5.4% of the population were below the poverty line, including 2.8% of those under age 18 and 13.9% of those age 65 or over.
