= Water Street, Milwaukee =

Street in Milwaukee, Wisconsin, United States

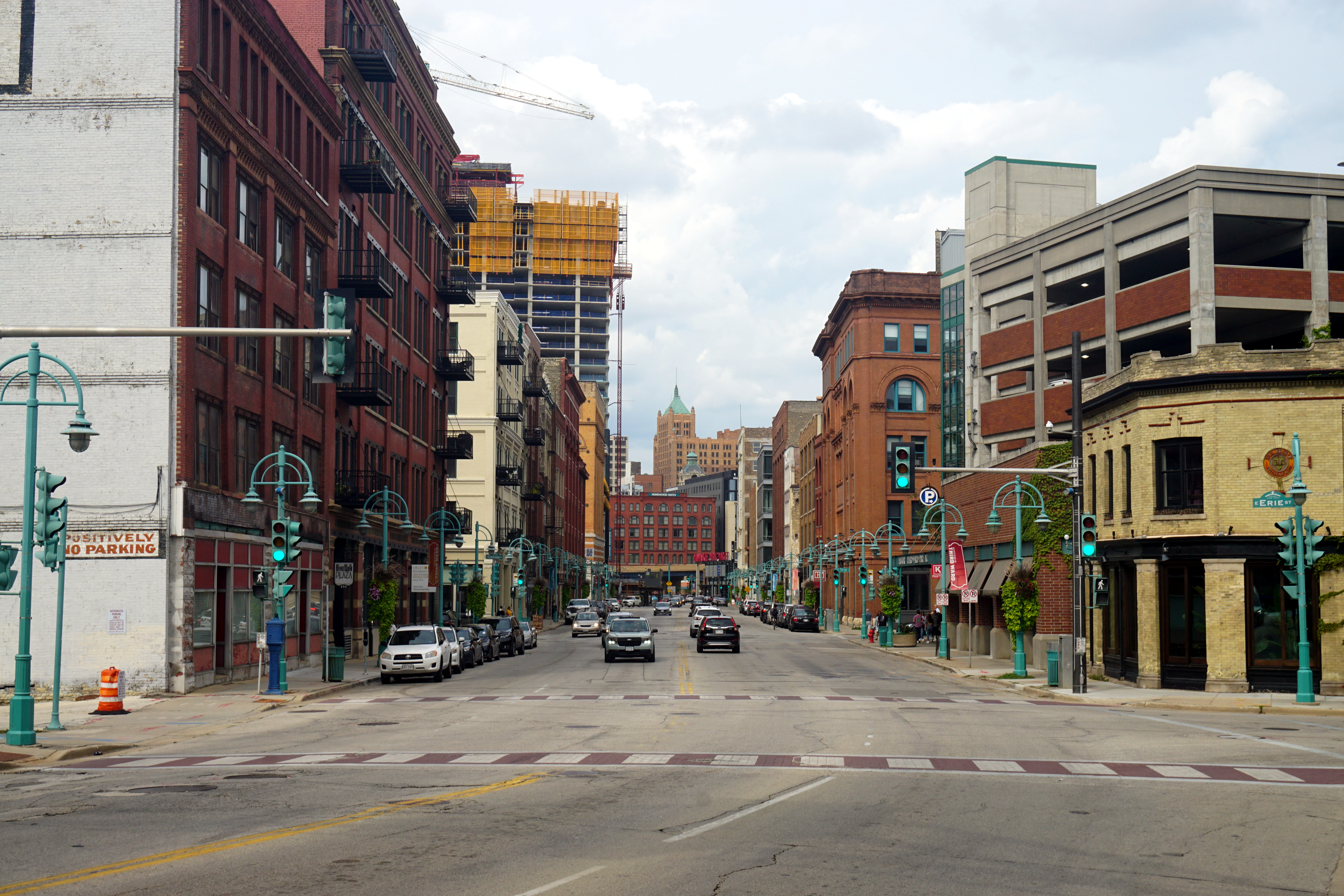
North Water Street in the Historic Third Ward, looking north towards downtown

Water Street is a prominent historic street and entertainment district in Milwaukee, Wisconsin. It is the site of the city's original building, City Hall, and multiple historic landmarks. Today it is still the major north–south road running through downtown and is home to Milwaukee's Theater District, Water Street Entertainment District, and much of the city's political activity.

== History and historic buildings ==
Water Street in Milwaukee, Wisconsin during the early 20th century

The intersection of E. Wisconsin Ave. and N. Water St. is the original building site in the city. What is now the 100 East Wisconsin building was once the site where Jacques Vieau, Milwaukee's first white settler, built his cabin in the early 1800s. Solomon Juneau, the city's founder, eventually took over Vieau's cabin, which started the development of Water Street as a place for commerce, accelerated by its proximity to the Milwaukee River. Even today, that original construction site is a critical central gathering place in the city, as demonstrated by participants in the Occupy Milwaukee protests on October 15, 2011. This was a gathering place for protesters because several major banks, including Chase, Associated, and Wells Fargo, all have branches at the intersection of W. Michigan Street and N. Water Street. In addition, the Marshall & Ilsley bank headquarters is several blocks north on Water Street.

In 1860, the city's first horse-drawn streetcar was operated by the River and Lakeshore City Railway Company, and the original route ran down Water Street. The street is home to Milwaukee City Hall, which was one of the tallest buildings in the world when it was completed in 1895 and was declared a National Historic Landmark in 2005.

Built in 1895, the Pabst Theater on Water Street has been designated a National Historic Landmark, and it is the fourth-oldest continuously operating theater in the United States.

== Geography ==
North and South Water Street is divided by the Milwaukee River, when it curves to the east, before opening into the Milwaukee Harbor.

=== North Water Street ===
The four-lane North Water Street skirts the Milwaukee Riverwalk and is the major north–south thoroughfare running through downtown Milwaukee. To the north, the street ends just past the E. Brady Street curve when it intersects N. Humboldt Ave and becomes E. Kane Place. To the south, the street becomes S. Water Street when it crosses the Milwaukee River. North Water Street passes through Milwaukee's East Town Neighborhood until it crosses I-794, where it then passes through the city's Historic Third Ward.

== Milwaukee Theater District ==
The Pabst was the original of the current Milwaukee theaters, and is a focal point of the city's theater district. With the exception of the nearby Milwaukee Theatre and the Riverside, all of downtown's major theaters are concentrated near the middle of North Water Street. Among them are the Milwaukee Repertory Theater, the Pabst, and the Marcus Center for the Performing Arts. Although the Pabst is the center point of the district, the Marcus Center is the most active, housing four major theater venues and seven resident performing arts groups, like First Stage Children's Theater.

In September 2011, plans to construct a new building on Water Street exclusively dedicated to the ballet were made public, when the Milwaukee Ballet announced they would partner with the UWM Dance Program and Froedert Hospital in what was billed as the Harmony Initiative. A likely location for the new building was to be the current site of the Marcus Center parking garage.

== Water Street Entertainment District ==
The term "Water Street" is synonymous with the entertainment district which is one block North and South of E. Juneau Ave. on North Water Street. The largest and oldest of Milwaukee's nightlife districts for over a century, also has the most name recognition, and is a gathering place for college students, likely because of its centralized location between Marquette University and University of Wisconsin–Milwaukee.

The street serves as a pit-stop for many of Milwaukee's Harley-Davidson riders as a result of its annual street festival that coincides with the Milwaukee Rally, which draws thousands of Harley-Davidson riders to Milwaukee from around the country. The success of Harley-Davidson's 100th Anniversary celebration has kept riders coming back to the street because of the ample parking and large patios.

The entertainment corridor of Water Street has traditionally been lined with bars and taverns, such as Rosie's, which celebrated its 30th anniversary in 2012. In recent years the area has added several restaurants, and has become one of Milwaukee's restaurant districts. AJ Bombers, opened by Joe Sorge, is known for "bombing" guests with peanuts from mechanical bombs overhead, and gained national attention when it was featured on the Travel Channel in an episode of Food Wars. On the show, Bombers' defeated Sobelmen's in a challenge for the best burger.

Streetza Pizza, the mobile pizza vendor which regularly parks on Water Street gained national attention in 2010, with articles in Time magazine and GQ because of its mastery of social media. The latest restaurant on the block to earn national recognition was Red Rock Saloon, when another Travel Channel show, Man v. Food Nation, filmed a Wisconsin man attempting their Unforgiven Challenge.

More recently, the businesses within the district have resumed working together for the first time since Riversplash! ended, and now plan to host regular street festivals, such as the 2011 Halloween Block Party.
