= Leaf Valley Township, Douglas County, Minnesota =

Leaf Valley Township, Minnesota
- Township
- Location within the state of Minnesota Leaf Valley Township, Minnesota (the United States)
- Coordinates: 46°3′26″N 95°26′53″W
- Country: United States
- State: Minnesota
- County: Douglas

Area
  - Total: 36.2 sq mi (93.8 km^{2})
  - Land: 33.4 sq mi (86.6 km^{2})
  - Water: 2.8 sq mi (7.2 km^{2})
- Elevation: 1,410 ft (430 m)

Population (2000)
  - Total: 484
  - Density: 15/sq mi (5.6/km^{2})
- Time zone: UTC-6 (Central (CST))
  - Summer (DST): UTC-5 (CDT)
- FIPS code: 27-36062
- GNIS feature ID: 0664740
- Website: https://leafvalleytownship.com/

Leaf Valley Township is a township in Douglas County, Minnesota, United States. The population was 404 at the 2020 census.

Leaf Valley Township was organized in 1867, and took its name from the nearby Leaf Hills Moraines.

== Geography ==
According to the United States Census Bureau, the township has a total area of 36.2 square miles (94 km^{2}), of which 33.4 square miles (87 km^{2}) is land and 2.8 square miles (7.3 km^{2}) (7.73%) is water.

== Demographics ==
As of the census of 2000, there were 484 people, 187 households, and 146 families residing in the township. The population density was 14.5 inhabitants per square mile (5.6/km^{2}). There were 338 housing units at an average density of 10.1 per square mile (3.9/km^{2}). The racial makeup of the township was 99.79% White, and 0.21% from two or more races. Hispanic or Latino of any race were 0.62% of the population.

There were 187 households, out of which 28.3% had children under the age of 18 living with them, 70.1% were married couples living together, 4.8% had a female householder with no husband present, and 21.4% were non-families. 18.7% of all households were made up of individuals, and 9.1% had someone living alone who was 65 years of age or older. The average household size was 2.59 and the average family size was 2.97.

In the township the population was spread out, with 22.7% under the age of 18, 6.4% from 18 to 24, 22.5% from 25 to 44, 30.6% from 45 to 64, and 17.8% who were 65 years of age or older. The median age was 43 years. For every 100 females, there were 118.0 males. For every 100 females age 18 and over, there were 113.7 males.

The median income for a household in the township was $41,500, and the median income for a family was $43,750. Males had a median income of $30,000 versus $21,429 for females. The per capita income for the township was $18,310. About 6.8% of families and 8.8% of the population were below the poverty line, including 17.1% of those under age 18 and 3.5% of those age 65 or over.
