= Miltona Township, Douglas County, Minnesota =

Miltona Township, Minnesota
- Township
- Location within the state of Minnesota Miltona Township, Minnesota (the United States)
- Coordinates: 46°3′7″N 95°19′0″W
- Country: United States
- State: Minnesota
- County: Douglas

Area
  - Total: 35.8 sq mi (92.8 km^{2})
  - Land: 27.1 sq mi (70.2 km^{2})
  - Water: 8.7 sq mi (22.6 km^{2})
- Elevation: 1,417 ft (432 m)

Population (2000)
  - Total: 814
  - Density: 30/sq mi (11.6/km^{2})
- Time zone: UTC-6 (Central (CST))
  - Summer (DST): UTC-5 (CDT)
- ZIP code: 56354
- Area code: 218
- FIPS code: 27-42416
- GNIS feature ID: 0664983
- Website: https://miltonatownship.org/

Miltona Township is a township in Douglas County, Minnesota, United States. The population was 914 at the 2020 census.

Miltona Township was organized in 1871, and named after Lake Miltona.

== Geography ==
According to the United States Census Bureau, the township has a total area of 35.8 square miles (92.8 km^{2}), of which 27.1 square miles (70.2 km^{2}) is land and 8.7 square miles (22.6 km^{2}) (24.33%) is water.

== Demographics ==
As of the census of 2000, there were 814 people, 345 households, and 259 families residing in the township. The population density was 30.0 inhabitants per square mile (11.6/km^{2}). There were 780 housing units at an average density of 28.8 per square mile (11.1/km^{2}). The racial makeup of the township was 99.26% White, 0.12% African American, 0.12% Asian, and 0.49% from two or more races. Hispanic or Latino of any race were 0.25% of the population.

There were 345 households, out of which 22.9% had children under the age of 18 living with them, 67.8% were married couples living together, 3.5% had a female householder with no husband present, and 24.9% were non-families. 21.4% of all households were made up of individuals, and 6.4% had someone living alone who was 65 years of age or older. The average household size was 2.36 and the average family size was 2.75.

In the township the population was spread out, with 20.3% under the age of 18, 5.2% from 18 to 24, 24.0% from 25 to 44, 35.0% from 45 to 64, and 15.6% who were 65 years of age or older. The median age was 45 years. For every 100 females, there were 112.0 males. For every 100 females age 18 and over, there were 111.4 males.

The median income for a household in the township was $38,083, and the median income for a family was $42,500. Males had a median income of $25,208 versus $22,381 for females. The per capita income for the township was $20,773. About 4.9% of families and 8.1% of the population were below the poverty line, including 10.2% of those under age 18 and 14.6% of those age 65 or over.
