= Holmes City, Minnesota =

Unincorporated community in Minnesota, United States

Holmes City
- Unincorporated community
- Location within Minnesota Location within the United States
- Coordinates: 45°50′01″N 95°32′28″W
- Country: United States
- State: Minnesota
- County: Douglas
- Elevation: 1,388 ft (423 m)
- Time zone: UTC-6 (Central (CST))
  - Summer (DST): UTC-5 (CDT)
- ZIP code: 56341
- Area code: 320
- GNIS feature ID: 645100

Holmes City is an unincorporated community in Douglas County, Minnesota, United States. Holmes City is 9 miles (14 km) southwest of Alexandria. Holmes City has a post office with ZIP code 56341.

A post office called Holmes City has been in operation since 1868. The community was named for US Supreme Court Justice Oliver Wendell Holmes Jr., who vacationed there as a child.
