= Garfield, Minnesota =

City in Minnesota, United States

Garfield
- City
- Location of Garfield, Minnesota
- Coordinates: 45°56′26″N 95°29′34″W
- Country: United States
- State: Minnesota
- County: Douglas

Area
  - Total: 0.81 sq mi (2.10 km^{2})
  - Land: 0.81 sq mi (2.09 km^{2})
  - Water: 0.0077 sq mi (0.02 km^{2})
- Elevation: 1,424 ft (434 m)

Population (2020)
  - Total: 349
  - Density: 433.5/sq mi (167.37/km^{2})
- Time zone: UTC-6 (Central (CST))
  - Summer (DST): UTC-5 (CDT)
- ZIP code: 56332
- Area code: 320
- FIPS code: 27-23120
- GNIS feature ID: 2394854
- Website: garfieldmn.com

Garfield is a city in Douglas County, Minnesota, United States. The population was 349 at the 2020 census.

== History ==
Garfield was platted in 1882. It was named for James Garfield, 20th President of the United States.

== Geography ==
According to the United States Census Bureau, the city has a total area of 0.78 square miles (2.02 km^{2}), of which 0.77 square miles (1.99 km^{2}) is land and 0.01 square miles (0.03 km^{2}) is water.

== Demographics ==
Historical population
Census	Pop.	Note	%±
1910	160		—
1920	176		10.0%
1930	180		2.3%
1940	203		12.8%
1950	244		20.2%
1960	240		−1.6%
1970	198		−17.5%
1980	284		43.4%
1990	203		−28.5%
2000	281		38.4%
2010	354		26.0%
2020	349		−1.4%
U.S. Decennial Census; 2020 Census

=== 2010 census ===
As of the census of 2010, there were 354 people, 142 households, and 94 families living in the city. The population density was 459.7 inhabitants per square mile (177.5/km^{2}). There were 158 housing units at an average density of 205.2 per square mile (79.2/km^{2}). The racial makeup of the city was 96.3% White, 0.3% African American, 0.3% from other races, and 3.1% from two or more races. Hispanic or Latino of any race were 0.8% of the population.

There were 142 households, of which 38.0% had children under the age of 18 living with them, 43.7% were married couples living together, 12.7% had a female householder with no husband present, 9.9% had a male householder with no wife present, and 33.8% were non-families. 25.4% of all households were made up of individuals, and 9.1% had someone living alone who was 65 years of age or older. The average household size was 2.49 and the average family size was 2.95.

The median age in the city was 33.3 years. 28.2% of residents were under the age of 18; 7.3% were between the ages of 18 and 24; 29.6% were from 25 to 44; 25.4% were from 45 to 64; and 9.3% were 65 years of age or older. The gender makeup of the city was 48.6% male and 51.4% female.

=== 2000 census ===
As of the census of 2000, there were 281 people, 111 households, and 71 families living in the city. The population density was 364.6 inhabitants per square mile (140.8/km^{2}). There were 121 housing units at an average density of 157.0 per square mile (60.6/km^{2}). The racial makeup of the city was 97.86% White, 0.71% Native American, 0.36% Asian, and 1.07% from two or more races.

There were 111 households, out of which 36.9% had children under the age of 18 living with them, 51.4% were married couples living together, 8.1% had a female householder with no husband present, and 36.0% were non-families. 32.4% of all households were made up of individuals, and 9.9% had someone living alone who was 65 years of age or older. The average household size was 2.53 and the average family size was 3.24.

In the city, the population was spread out, with 29.5% under the age of 18, 11.4% from 18 to 24, 29.5% from 25 to 44, 19.6% from 45 to 64, and 10.0% who were 65 years of age or older. The median age was 31 years. For every 100 females, there were 84.9 males. For every 100 females age 18 and over, there were 90.4 males.

The median income for a household in the city was $30,000, and the median income for a family was $35,714. Males had a median income of $27,500 versus $20,833 for females. The per capita income for the city was $12,847. About 13.5% of families and 15.6% of the population were below the poverty line, including 14.9% of those under the age of eighteen and 25.0% of those 65 or over.
