= Alexandria Township, Douglas County, Minnesota =

Alexandria Township, Minnesota
- Township
- Location within the state of Minnesota Alexandria Township, Minnesota (the United States)
- Coordinates: 45°54′7″N 95°20′45″W
- Country: United States
- State: Minnesota
- County: Douglas

Area
  - Total: 29.2 sq mi (75.7 km^{2})
  - Land: 24.6 sq mi (63.8 km^{2})
  - Water: 4.6 sq mi (11.9 km^{2})
- Elevation: 1,388 ft (423 m)

Population (2020)
  - Total: 2,964
  - Density: 193/sq mi (74.6/km^{2})
- Time zone: UTC-6 (Central (CST))
  - Summer (DST): UTC-5 (CDT)
- ZIP code: 56308
- Area code: 320
- FIPS code: 27-00946
- GNIS feature ID: 0663413

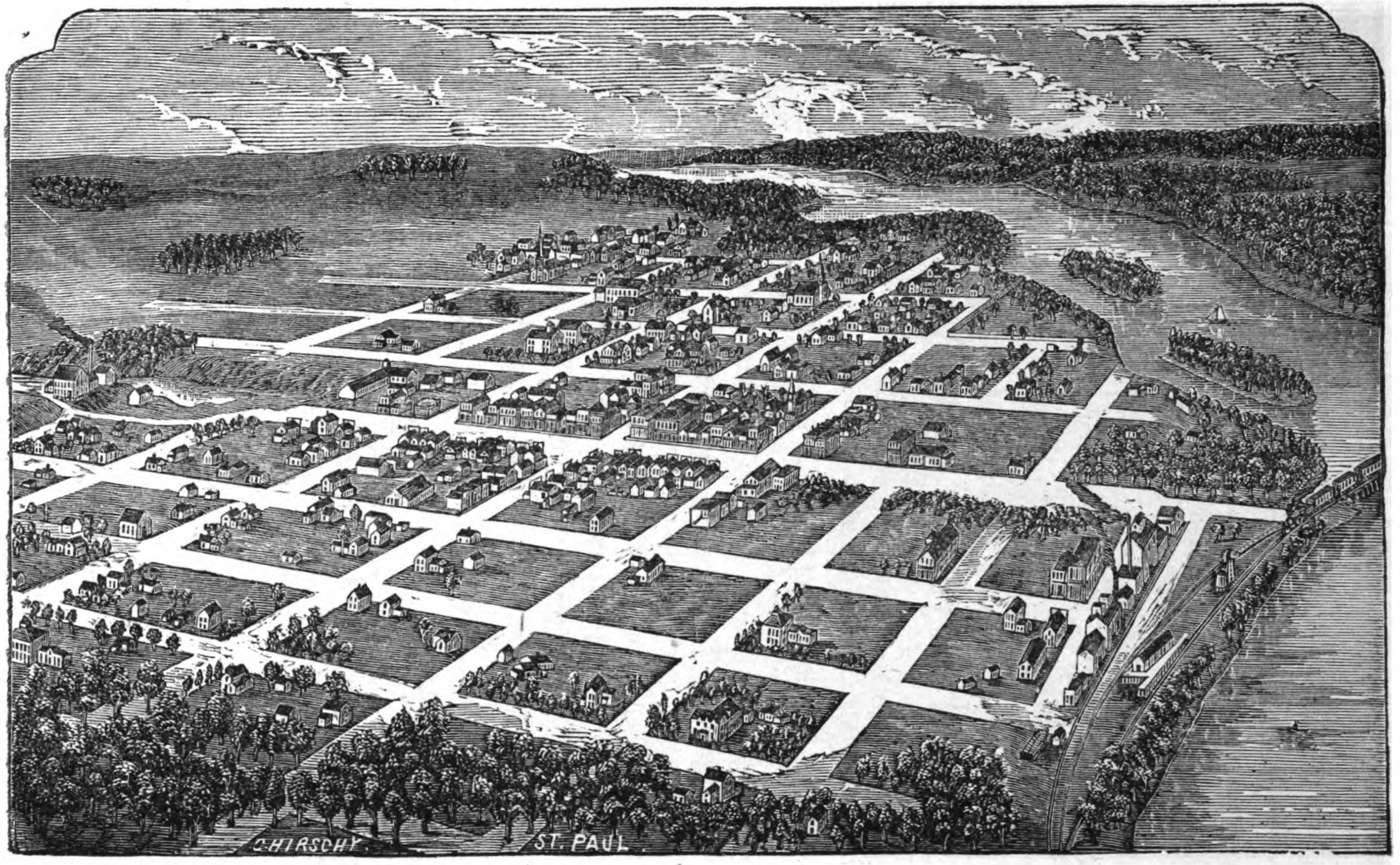
View of Alexandria in 1881

Alexandria Township is a township in Douglas County, Minnesota, United States. The population was 2,964 at the 2020 census.

== Geography ==
According to the United States Census Bureau, the township has a total area of 29.2 square miles (76 km^{2}), of which 24.6 square miles (64 km^{2}) is land and 4.6 square miles (12 km^{2}) (15.71%) is water.

== Demographics ==
Historical population
Census	Pop.	Note	%±
1880	139		—
1890	470		238.1%
1900	672		43.0%
1910	678		0.9%
1920	796		17.4%
1930	807		1.4%
1940	796		−1.4%
1950	1,118		40.5%
1960	1,594		42.6%
1970	2,512		57.6%
1980	3,521		40.2%
1990	4,014		14.0%
2000	4,760		18.6%
2010	4,098		−13.9%
2020	2,964		−27.7%
U.S. Decennial Census; 2020 Census

As of the census of 2000, there were 4,760 people, 1,764 households, and 1,393 families residing in the township. The population density was 193.3 inhabitants per square mile (74.6/km^{2}). There were 2,044 housing units at an average density of 83.0/sq mi (32.1/km^{2}). The racial makeup of the township was 98.36% White, 0.17% African American, 0.27% Native American, 0.36% Asian, 0.02% Pacific Islander, 0.21% from other races, and 0.61% from two or more races. Hispanic or Latino of any race were 0.55% of the population.

There were 1,764 households, out of which 36.8% had children under the age of 18 living with them, 71.9% were married couples living together, 5.2% had a female householder with no husband present, and 21.0% were non-families. 16.6% of all households were made up of individuals, and 6.2% had someone living alone who was 65 years of age or older. The average household size was 2.68 and the average family size was 2.99.

In the township the population was spread out, with 26.7% under the age of 18, 7.0% from 18 to 24, 26.7% from 25 to 44, 25.8% from 45 to 64, and 13.9% who were 65 years of age or older. The median age was 40 years. For every 100 females, there were 101.6 males. For every 100 females age 18 and over, there were 99.1 males.

The median income for a household in the township was $48,846, and the median income for a family was $55,901. Males had a median income of $36,635 versus $22,207 for females. The per capita income for the township was $24,514. About 4.3% of families and 5.4% of the population were below the poverty line, including 5.5% of those under age 18 and 6.2% of those age 65 or over.
