= Osakis Township, Douglas County, Minnesota =

Osakis Township, Minnesota
- Township
- Location within the state of Minnesota Osakis Township, Minnesota (the United States)
- Coordinates: 45°53′40″N 95°11′30″W
- Country: United States
- State: Minnesota
- County: Douglas

Area
  - Total: 34.1 sq mi (88.4 km^{2})
  - Land: 31.4 sq mi (81.2 km^{2})
  - Water: 2.7 sq mi (7.1 km^{2})
- Elevation: 1,352 ft (412 m)

Population (2020)
  - Total: 681
  - Density: 19/sq mi (7.2/km^{2})
- Time zone: UTC-6 (Central (CST))
  - Summer (DST): UTC-5 (CDT)
- ZIP code: 56360
- Area code: 320
- FIPS code: 27-48814
- GNIS feature ID: 0665225

Osakis Township is a township in Douglas County, Minnesota, United States. The population was 681 at the 2020 census.

Osakis Township was organized in 1866, and named after Lake Osakis.

== Geography ==
According to the United States Census Bureau, the township has a total area of 34.1 square miles (88.4 km^{2}), of which 31.4 square miles (81.2 km^{2}) is land and 2.8 square miles (7.1 km^{2}) (8.06%) is water.

== Demographics ==
At the 2000 census, there were 584 people, 216 households and 166 families residing in the township. The population density was 18.6 per square mile (7.2/km^{2}). There were 324 housing units at an average density of 10.3/sq mi (4.0/km^{2}). The racial makeup of the township was 98.80% White, 0.17% Pacific Islander, and 1.03% from two or more races. Hispanic or Latino of any race were 0.17% of the population.

There were 216 households, of which 37.5% had children under the age of 18 living with them, 69.9% were married couples living together, 3.2% had a female householder with no husband present, and 23.1% were non-families. 20.4% of all households were made up of individuals, and 7.4% had someone living alone who was 65 years of age or older. The average household size was 2.70 and the average family size was 3.13.

30.3% of the population were under the age of 18, 5.3% from 18 to 24, 26.0% from 25 to 44, 25.9% from 45 to 64, and 12.5% who were 65 years of age or older. The median age was 39 years. For every 100 females, there were 109.3 males. For every 100 females age 18 and over, there were 114.2 males.

The median household income was $35,909 and the median family income was $46,563. Males had a median income of $30,417 and females $21,458. The per capita income was $16,130. About 9.6% of families and 11.4% of the population were below the poverty line, including 10.9% of those under age 18 and 12.5% of those age 65 or over.
