= Spruce Hill Township, Douglas County, Minnesota =

Spruce Hill Township, Minnesota
- Township
- Location within the state of Minnesota Spruce Hill Township, Minnesota (the United States)
- Coordinates: 46°4′17″N 95°12′46″W
- Country: United States
- State: Minnesota
- County: Douglas

Area
  - Total: 36.1 sq mi (93.6 km^{2})
  - Land: 35.8 sq mi (92.8 km^{2})
  - Water: 0.31 sq mi (0.8 km^{2})
- Elevation: 1,410 ft (430 m)

Population (2000)
  - Total: 395
  - Density: 11/sq mi (4.3/km^{2})
- Time zone: UTC-6 (Central (CST))
  - Summer (DST): UTC-5 (CDT)
- FIPS code: 27-62248
- GNIS feature ID: 0665687

Spruce Hill Township is a township in Douglas County, Minnesota, United States. The population was 462 at the 2020 census.

== History ==
Spruce Hill Township was organized in 1875, and named for the spruce trees which grow upon the hills within its borders.

== Geography ==
According to the United States Census Bureau, the township has a total area of 36.1 square miles (93.6 km^{2}), of which 35.8 square miles (92.8 km^{2}) is land and 0.3 square mile (0.8 km^{2}) (0.83%) is water.

== Demographics ==
As of the census of 2000, there were 395 people, 141 households, and 112 families residing in the township. The population density was 11.0 people per square mile (4.3/km^{2}). There were 154 housing units at an average density of 4.3/sq mi (1.7/km^{2}). The racial makeup of the township was 98.23% White, 0.25% Native American, 1.01% Asian, and 0.51% from two or more races.

There were 141 households, out of which 39.7% had children under the age of 18 living with them, 73.0% were married couples living together, 5.0% had a female householder with no husband present, and 19.9% were non-families. 17.7% of all households were made up of individuals, and 5.0% had someone living alone who was 65 years of age or older. The average household size was 2.80 and the average family size was 3.17.

In the township the population was spread out, with 30.9% under the age of 18, 4.3% from 18 to 24, 30.4% from 25 to 44, 23.0% from 45 to 64, and 11.4% who were 65 years of age or older. The median age was 37 years. For every 100 females, there were 106.8 males. For every 100 females age 18 and over, there were 111.6 males.

The median income for a household in the township was $37,292, and the median income for a family was $40,313. Males had a median income of $25,625 versus $21,477 for females. The per capita income for the township was $14,583. About 12.2% of families and 15.3% of the population were below the poverty line, including 20.6% of those under age 18 and 13.0% of those age 65 or over.
