= Douglas County, Minnesota =

County in Minnesota, United States

- County
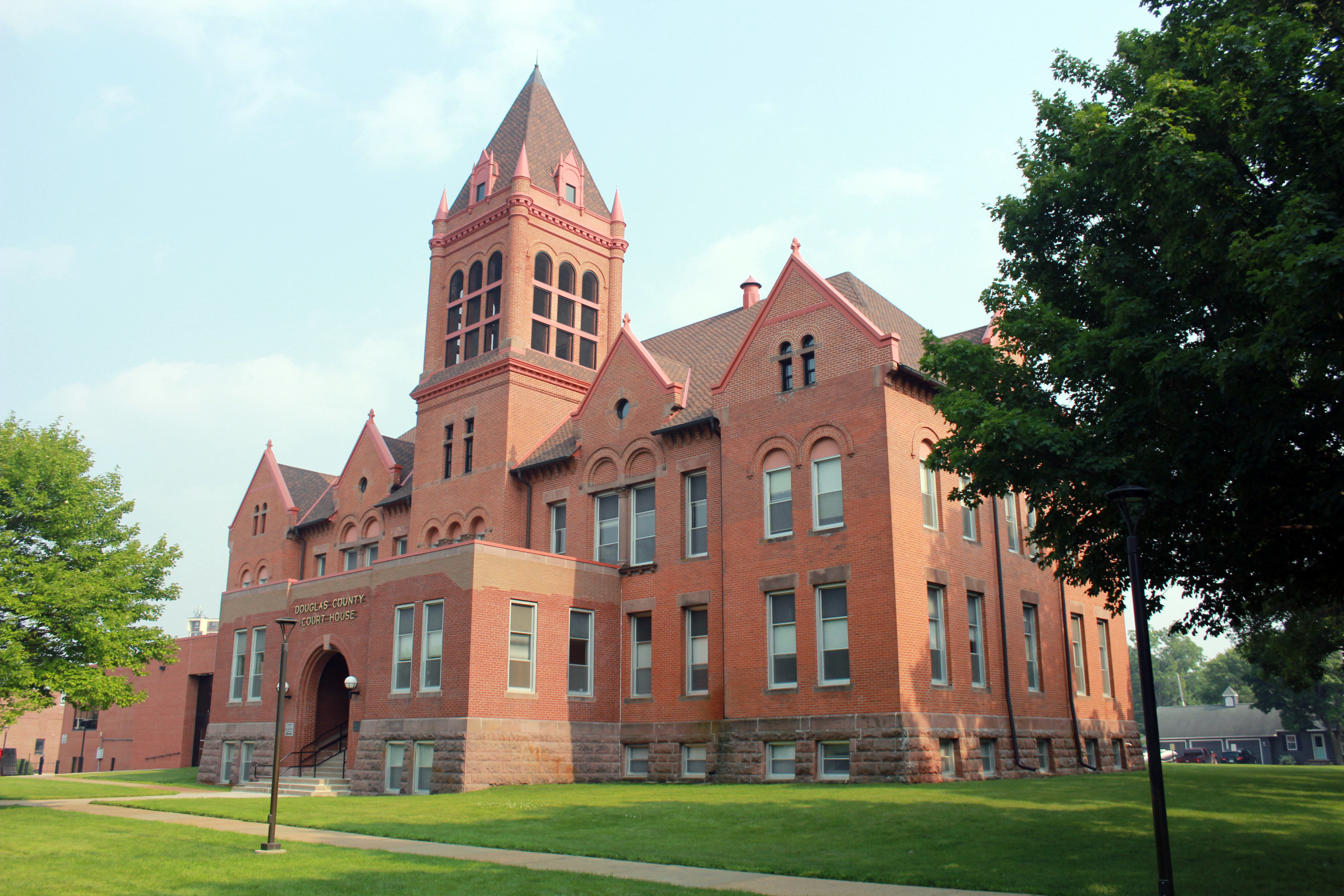
- Douglas County Courthouse in Alexandria, Minnesota.

- Location within the U.S. state of Minnesota
- Coordinates: 45°56′N 95°27′W
- Country: United States
- State: Minnesota
- Created: March 8, 1858
- Organized: 1866
- Named for: Stephen A. Douglas
- Seat: Alexandria
- Largest city: Alexandria

Area
  - Total: 720 sq mi (1,900 km^{2})
  - Land: 637 sq mi (1,650 km^{2})
  - Water: 83 sq mi (210 km^{2}) 11%

Population (2020)
  - Total: 39,006
  - Estimate (2025): 40,120 ▲
  - Density: 61.2/sq mi (23.6/km^{2})
- Time zone: UTC−6 (Central)
  - Summer (DST): UTC−5 (CDT)
- Congressional district: 7th
- Website: www.douglascountymn.gov

Douglas County is a county in the U.S. state of Minnesota. As of the 2020 census, the population was 39,006. Its county seat is Alexandria.

Douglas County comprises the Alexandria, Minnesota, Micropolitan Statistical Area.

Douglas County is the home of Minnesota's only wine-grape appellation, the 10,880 acres (44.0 km^{2}) Alexandria Lakes AVA.

== History ==
The territorial legislature created Douglas County on March 8, 1858, shortly before Minnesota attained statehood. It was named for political figure Stephen A. Douglas, who was serving as a US Senator from Illinois at the time of the county's creation. The county organization was completed in 1866.

== Geography ==
Spruce Creek flows southeast through northeastern Douglas county. The county consists of rolling hills, heavily dotted with lakes and ponds, especially in its north-to-south central portion. The hilly terrain generally slopes to the south and west; its highest point is near the northeast corner, at 1,483 ft (452 m) ASL. The county has an area of 720 square miles (1,900 km^{2}), of which 637 square miles (1,650 km^{2}) is land and 83 square miles (210 km^{2}) (11%) is water. It contains more than 250 lakes.

The county includes two of Minnesota's biomes: prairie grassland in the west and southeast, savannas (also prairie ecosystems) in the middle, and temperate deciduous forest in the south-central, north, and east. Douglas is one of 17 Minnesota counties where savanna soils predominate.

Soils of Douglas County

=== Major highways ===
- Interstate 94
- U.S. Highway 52
- Minnesota State Highway 27
- Minnesota State Highway 29
- Minnesota State Highway 55
- Minnesota State Highway 79
- Minnesota State Highway 114

=== Airports ===
- Alexandria Municipal Airport ("Chandler Field"), city-owned public-use airport

=== Adjacent counties ===
- Otter Tail County - north
- Todd County - east
- Stearns County - southeast
- Pope County - south
- Stevens County - southwest
- Grant County - west

=== Protected areas ===
- Anderson State Wildlife Management Area
- Balgaard State Wildlife Management Area
- Chermak State Wildlife Management Area
- Herberger Lake State Wildlife Management Area
- Kensington State Wildlife Management Area
- La Grand State Wildlife Management Area
- Lake Carlos State Park
- Osakis State Wildlife Management Area North Unit (part)
- Red Rock Wildlife Management Area
- Roger M. Holmes State Wildlife Management Area
- Schnepf State Wildlife Management Area
- Thornberg State Wildlife Management Area
- Urness State Wildlife Management Area

== Demographics ==
Historical population
Census	Pop.	Note	%±
1870	4,239		—
1880	9,130		115.4%
1890	14,606		60.0%
1900	17,964		23.0%
1910	17,669		−1.6%
1920	19,039		7.8%
1930	18,813		−1.2%
1940	20,369		8.3%
1950	21,304		4.6%
1960	21,313		0.0%
1970	22,892		7.4%
1980	27,839		21.6%
1990	28,674		3.0%
2000	32,821		14.5%
2010	36,009		9.7%
2020	39,006		8.3%
2025 (est.)	40,120	▲	2.9%
U.S. Decennial Census; 1790-1960 1900-1990; 1990-2000 2010-2020

=== Racial and ethnic composition ===
Douglas County, Minnesota – Racial and ethnic composition Note: the US Census treats Hispanic/Latino as an ethnic category. This table excludes Latinos from the racial categories and assigns them to a separate category. Hispanics/Latinos may be of any race.
Race / Ethnicity (NH = Non-Hispanic)	Pop 1980	Pop 1990	Pop 2000	Pop 2010	Pop 2020	% 1980	% 1990	% 2000	% 2010	% 2020
White alone (NH)	27,595	28,409	32,216	34,974	36,629	99.12%	99.08%	98.16%	97.13%	93.91%
Black or African American alone (NH)	4	14	58	146	223	0.01%	0.05%	0.18%	0.41%	0.57%
Native American or Alaska Native alone (NH)	45	73	74	94	104	0.16%	0.25%	0.23%	0.26%	0.27%
Asian alone (NH)	91	100	130	163	227	0.33%	0.35%	0.40%	0.45%	0.58%
Native Hawaiian or Pacific Islander alone (NH)	x	x	9	3	11	x	x	0.03%	0.01%	0.03%
Other race alone (NH)	33	0	3	7	60	0.12%	0.00%	0.01%	0.02%	0.15%
Mixed race or Multiracial (NH)	x	x	138	281	937	x	x	0.42%	0.78%	2.40%
Hispanic or Latino (any race)	71	78	193	341	815	0.26%	0.27%	0.59%	0.95%	2.09%
Total	27,839	28,674	32,821	36,009	39,006	100.00%	100.00%	100.00%	100.00%	100.00%

=== 2020 census ===
As of the 2020 census, the county had a population of 39,006. The median age was 43.8 years. 21.6% of residents were under the age of 18 and 23.5% of residents were 65 years of age or older. For every 100 females there were 99.8 males, and for every 100 females age 18 and over there were 98.2 males age 18 and over.

The racial makeup of the county was 94.6% White, 0.6% Black or African American, 0.3% American Indian and Alaska Native, 0.6% Asian, <0.1% Native Hawaiian and Pacific Islander, 0.7% from some other race, and 3.2% from two or more races. Hispanic or Latino residents of any race comprised 2.1% of the population.

48.6% of residents lived in urban areas, while 51.4% lived in rural areas.

There were 16,557 households in the county, of which 25.3% had children under the age of 18 living in them. Of all households, 53.4% were married-couple households, 18.1% were households with a male householder and no spouse or partner present, and 22.1% were households with a female householder and no spouse or partner present. About 29.8% of all households were made up of individuals and 13.5% had someone living alone who was 65 years of age or older.

There were 21,769 housing units, of which 23.9% were vacant. Among occupied housing units, 75.0% were owner-occupied and 25.0% were renter-occupied. The homeowner vacancy rate was 1.2% and the rental vacancy rate was 7.9%.

=== 2000 census ===
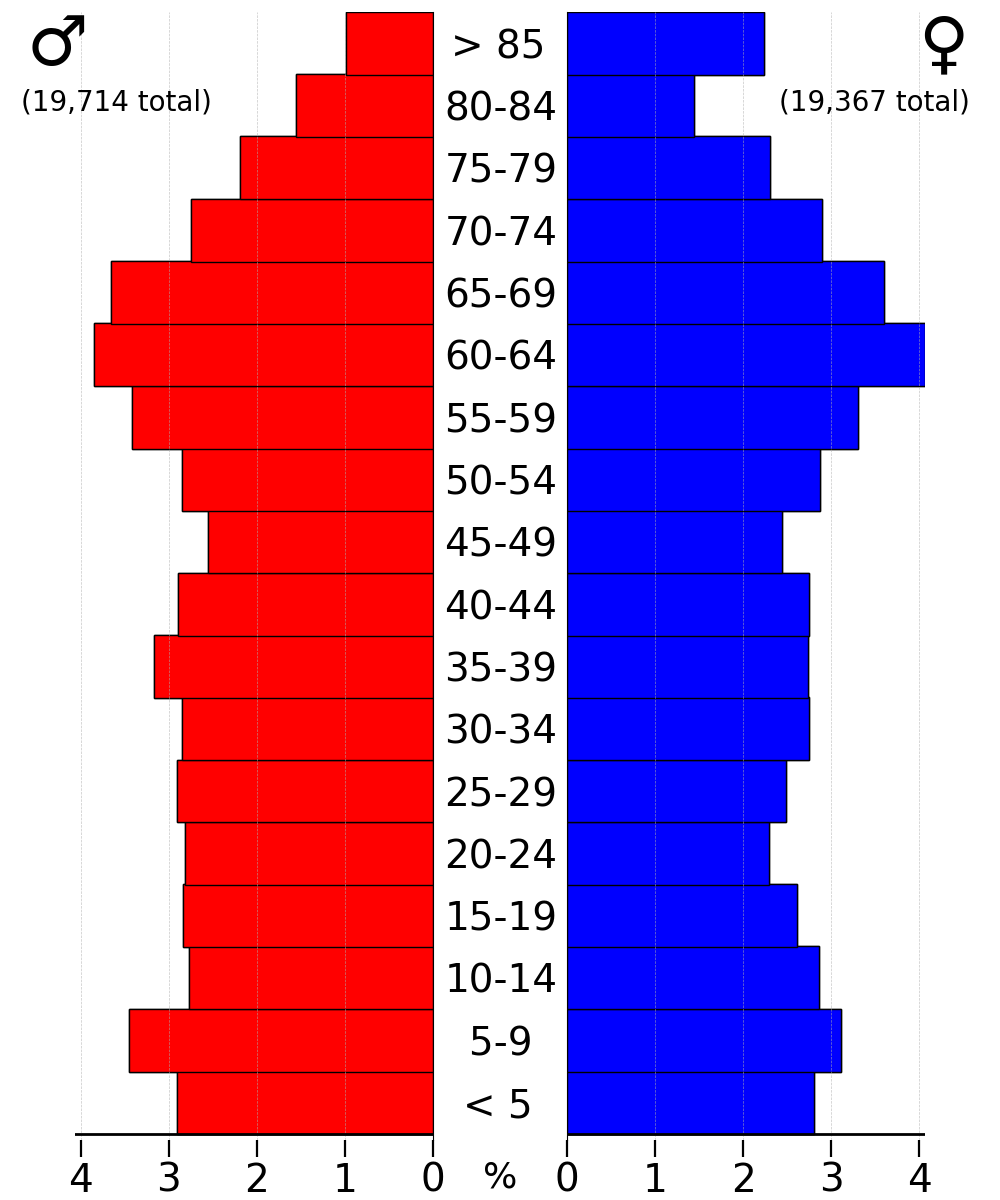
2022 US Census population pyramid for Douglas County, from ACS 5-year estimates

As of the census of 2000, there were 32,821 people, 13,276 households, and 9,027 families in the county. The population density was 51.5 per square mile (19.9/km^{2}). There were 16,694 housing units at an average density of 26.2 per square mile (10.1/km^{2}). The racial makeup of the county was 98.49% White, 0.18% Black or African American, 0.24% Native American, 0.40% Asian, 0.03% Pacific Islander, 0.18% from other races, and 0.48% from two or more races. 0.59% of the population were Hispanic or Latino of any race. 38.5% were of German, 24.6% Norwegian and 8.1% Swedish ancestry.

There were 13,276 households, out of which 29.90% had children under the age of 18 living with them, 59.00% were married couples living together, 6.40% had a female householder with no husband present, and 32.00% were non-families. 26.50% of all households were made up of individuals, and 12.30% had someone living alone who was 65 years of age or older. The average household size was 2.42 and the average family size was 2.93.

The county population contained 24.00% under the age of 18, 9.20% from 18 to 24, 25.00% from 25 to 44, 23.80% from 45 to 64, and 17.90% who were 65 years of age or older. The median age was 40 years. For every 100 females there were 99.00 males. For every 100 females age 18 and over, there were 96.90 males.

The median income for a household in the county was $37,703, and the median income for a family was $46,250. Males had a median income of $30,968 versus $21,240 for females. The per capita income for the county was $18,850. About 5.60% of families and 8.50% of the population were below the poverty line, including 9.30% of those under age 18 and 11.00% of those age 65 or over.

== Communities ==
=== Cities ===
- Alexandria (county seat)
- Brandon
- Carlos
- Evansville
- Forada
- Garfield
- Kensington
- Millerville
- Miltona
- Nelson
- Osakis (part)

=== Unincorporated communities ===
- Belle River
- Holmes City
- Leaf Valley
- Rose City

=== Townships ===
- Alexandria Township
- Belle River Township
- Brandon Township
- Carlos Township
- Evansville Township
- Holmes City Township
- Hudson Township
- Ida Township
- La Grand Township
- Lake Mary Township
- Leaf Valley Township
- Lund Township
- Millerville Township
- Miltona Township
- Moe Township
- Orange Township
- Osakis Township
- Solem Township
- Spruce Hill Township
- Urness Township

== Government and politics ==
Douglas County traditionally votes Republican. In only one presidential election since 1964 has it selected the Democratic candidate. In recent years the Republican tilt in the county has increased, with Donald Trump receiving 67% of the county's vote in 2024, the best performance for a Republican presidential candidate since Theodore Roosevelt in 1904.

United States presidential election results for Douglas County, Minnesota
Year	Republican		Democratic		Third party(ies)	
Year	No.	%	No.	%	No.	%
1892	1,315	50.89%	533	20.63%	736	28.48%
1896	1,966	57.84%	1,350	39.72%	83	2.44%
1900	1,917	59.87%	1,194	37.29%	91	2.84%
1904	2,171	79.41%	410	15.00%	153	5.60%
1908	1,894	60.92%	979	31.49%	236	7.59%
1912	435	14.94%	793	27.23%	1,684	57.83%
1916	1,709	50.26%	1,398	41.12%	293	8.62%
1920	4,428	66.13%	733	10.95%	1,535	22.92%
1924	2,424	39.15%	315	5.09%	3,453	55.77%
1928	4,262	59.27%	2,829	39.34%	100	1.39%
1932	2,325	30.37%	5,101	66.63%	230	3.00%
1936	2,681	36.41%	4,186	56.84%	497	6.75%
1940	4,652	50.53%	4,507	48.95%	48	0.52%
1944	4,140	52.62%	3,681	46.79%	46	0.58%
1948	3,744	41.73%	5,022	55.97%	207	2.31%
1952	6,037	61.30%	3,768	38.26%	43	0.44%
1956	5,114	54.87%	4,194	45.00%	12	0.13%
1960	5,594	53.25%	4,871	46.36%	41	0.39%
1964	4,122	40.51%	6,040	59.36%	13	0.13%
1968	5,464	50.41%	4,826	44.52%	549	5.07%
1972	6,678	52.97%	5,501	43.64%	427	3.39%
1976	5,910	44.39%	7,097	53.30%	307	2.31%
1980	7,778	53.85%	5,530	38.28%	1,137	7.87%
1984	9,005	61.92%	5,444	37.43%	94	0.65%
1988	7,898	57.02%	5,803	41.89%	151	1.09%
1992	6,356	40.08%	5,252	33.12%	4,251	26.80%
1996	6,747	43.63%	6,450	41.71%	2,267	14.66%
2000	9,811	57.02%	6,352	36.92%	1,042	6.06%
2004	11,793	58.07%	8,219	40.47%	297	1.46%
2008	11,241	53.74%	9,256	44.25%	421	2.01%
2012	11,884	56.72%	8,653	41.30%	416	1.99%
2016	13,966	64.11%	6,227	28.58%	1,592	7.31%
2020	15,799	65.38%	7,868	32.56%	498	2.06%
2024	16,726	66.62%	7,938	31.62%	442	1.76%

County Board of Commissioners
Position	Name	District
Commissioner	Keith Englund	District 1
Commissioner	Tim Kalina	District 2
Commissioner	Jerry Rapp	District 3
Commissioner	Charlie Meyer	District 4
Commissioner	Shane Schmidt	District 5

State Legislature (2018-2020)
Position	Name	Affiliation	District
Senate	Bill Ingebrigtsen	Republican	District 8
Senate	Torrey Westrom	Republican	District 12
House of Representatives	Mary Franson	Republican	District 8B
House of Representatives	Jeff Backer	Republican	District 12A
House of Representatives	Paul Anderson	Republican	District 12B

U.S Congress (2021-2023)
Position	Name	Affiliation	District
House of Representatives	Michelle Fischbach	Republican	7th
Senate	Amy Klobuchar	DFL	N/A
Senate	Tina Smith	DFL	N/A

== See also ==
- National Register of Historic Places listings in Douglas County, Minnesota
