= Arrowhead (disambiguation) =

An arrowhead is the point of an arrow.

Arrowhead or Arrow Head may also refer to:

== Geography ==
=== Antarctica ===
- Arrowhead Range, Victoria Land
- Arrowhead Nunatak, Oates Land

=== Canada ===
- Arrowhead, British Columbia, a former steamboat port and town, now submerged
- Arrowhead Mountain, Ellesmere Island, Nunavut
- Arrowhead Provincial Park, located in Huntsville, Ontario
- Arrowhead Lake (Ontario), four lakes in the province of Ontario

=== United States ===
- Arrowhead, one of three villages comprising Beaver Creek Resort, Colorado
- Arrowhead Township, St. Louis County, Minnesota
- Arrowhead, Virginia, an unincorporated community
- Arrowhead Region, a region of northeastern Minnesota
  - Arrowhead State Trail
- Mount Arrowhead, Baranof Island, Alaska
- Arrowhead Mountain (Washington), in the Cascade Range
- Arrowhead Lake (Idaho)
- Arrowhead Trail, Pennsylvania
- Lake Arrowhead, Georgia
- Lake Arrowhead (Maine), an artificial lake
- Arrowhead Marsh, Oakland, California
- Arrowhead Pool, Grand Teton National Park, Wyoming
- Camp Arrowhead (disambiguation), various campgrounds, a summer camp and a day camp
- Arrowhead Recreation Area, Claremont, New Hampshire
- Arrowhead State Park, now Arrowhead Area, Pittsburg County, Oklahoma

== Homes ==
- Arrowhead (science fiction venue), the home of science fiction writer James Blish and his wife, literary agent and science fiction writer Virginia Kidd, frequented by many notable science fiction writers
- Arrowhead (Charlottesville, Virginia), United States, a historic home and farm complex
- Arrowhead (Herman Melville House), home of author Herman Melville in Pittsfield, Massachusetts

== Military ==
- Arrowhead 140, the export version of the Royal Navy Type 31 frigate designed by Babcock International
- Arrowhead device, a US military decoration
- Apache Arrowhead, a helicopter vision system
- HMCS Arrowhead, a World War II Royal Navy/Royal Canadian Navy corvette
- USS Arrowhead (AD-35), a planned destroyer tender that was cancelled due to the end of World War II
- USNS Arrowhead (T-AGSE-4), a US Navy submarine support vessel launched in 2009

== Animals ==
- Arrowhead dogfish, a fish species
- Arrowhead piculet, a bird species
- Arrowhead warbler, a bird species
- Verrucosa arenata, a spider species, also known as the arrowhead spider
- The AR strain of Drosophila pseudoobscura – see Drosophila pseudoobscura § Arrowhead

== Plants ==
- Sagittaria, a genus of aquatic plants with edible roots, native to the Americas, Eurasia, and Africa
- Nephthytis, a genus of herbaceous plants native to western Africa
- Syngonium, a genus of woody vines native to Mexico, the West Indies, and Central and South America

== Business ==
- Arrowhead Game Studios, a video game development company in Stockholm, Sweden
- Arrowhead Inn, a gambling and entertainment venue on Saratoga Lake, New York in the 1930s
- Arrowhead Mall, Muskogee, Oklahoma
- Arrowhead Pawn Shop, Jonesboro, Georgia, noted for the number of guns sold there that were later used in crimes
- Arrowhead Pharmaceuticals, a biopharmaceutical company based in Pasadena, California
- Arrowhead Towne Center, Glendale, Arizona
- Arrowhead Water, a brand of bottled water owned by Nestlé

== Film and television ==
- Arrowhead (1953 film), an American western film starring Charlton Heston and Jack Palance
- Arrowhead (1994 film), a Canadian short mockumentary
- Arrowhead (2015 film), an Australian science fiction film
- "Arrow Head", an episode of the television series King of the Hill (season 2)

== Sports ==
- Arrowhead Stadium, Kansas City, Missouri
- Arrowhead 135, an annual ultramarathon event staged in International Falls, Minnesota
- Arrowhead (American football), a Native American National Football League player in the 1923 season
- Arrowhead Conference, consisting of six junior colleges in northern Illinois
- Arrowhead League, a California high school athletic league

== Other uses ==
- Arrowhead Regional Medical Center, Colton, California, a teaching hospital
- Arrowhead High School, Hartland, Wisconsin
- Arrowhead Christian Academy, a private Christian high school in Redlands, California
- Arrowhead (train), a train operated by Amtrak in the 1970s
- Arrowhead Line, a streetcar line operated by Pacific Electric in the early 1900s
- Arrow Head, a Rock Island Rockets, a baggage-dinette-coach railroad car
- Arrowhead Library System (Minnesota), a public library system
- Arrowhead Library System (Wisconsin), a public library system
- Arrowhead Trail (auto trail), a historic auto trail from Los Angeles to Salt Lake City
- Arrowhead (album), a 2008 album by Prurient

== See also ==
- Arrowhead matrix, used in linear algebra
- Arrowhead Pond, former name of an indoor arena in Anaheim, California
- ARMA 2: Operation Arrowhead, an expansion pack for the military simulation video game ArmA II
- Arrow (disambiguation)
