= Arrowhead Library System =

Arrowhead Library System may refer to:

- Arrowhead Library System (Minnesota), a public library system
- Arrowhead Library System (Wisconsin), a public library system
