= Dickinson Theatres =

American movie theater chain (1920-2014)

Dickinson Theatres, Inc.
- Type: Private
- Industry: Entertainment (movie theatres)
- Founded: November 1920; 106 years ago, in Manhattan, Kansas, U.S.
- Founder: Glen W Dickinson Sr.
- Defunct: October 2014
- Fate: Bought out by B&B Theatres
- Headquarters: Overland Park, Kansas, U.S.
- Key people: Ron Horton (CEO)
- Products: Dickinson Theatres
- Website: www.dtmovies.com

Dickinson Theatres, Inc. was a privately owned American movie theater chain based in Overland Park. It operated 15 theaters with 169 screens in seven states: Arkansas, Arizona, Kansas, Missouri, Nebraska, Oklahoma, and Texas. In October 2014, the chain was purchased by B&B Theatres.

== History ==
In 1920, company founder Glen W. Dickinson, Sr quit the family business –a Ford dealership in Brookfield, Missouri specializing in tractors—to purchase a small two-screen theatre in a booming agricultural college town. The Dickinson Marshall Theatre in Manhattan, Kansas was christened in November 1920 as the first of many Dickinson Theatres.

After success with his first venture in the motion picture exhibition, Dickinson soon added a second market to his circuit. The Dickinson Bowersock Theatre sprung up in a booming college town less than 2 hours away in Lawrence, Kansas.

It wasn't long after when a second Lawrence theatre was opened, and within a brief period of time, the fledgling circuit had expanded its size and scope to include theatres in Junction City, Ellsworth, Beloit, and Great Bend, Kansas. He also added a theatre in Springfield, Missouri.

By 1931, Dickinson Theatres had grown to parent 26 theatres and continued to expand. It was at that time Dickinson decided to relocate the company office to Lawrence, Kansas.

In 1946, the company branched out to introduce its first drive-in theatre. The first Dickinson drive-in opened in Pittsburg, Kansas and was followed in 1948 by the construction of the 81 Drive-In Theatre in Salina, Kansas, the Shawnee Drive-In in Shawnee, Kansas and the Leawood Drive-In Theatre in Leawood, Kansas.

Company expansion and diversification continued under the operation of Glen W. Dickinson, Jr. as theatres sprung up in Waterloo, Iowa, Quincy, Illinois, Monroe, Missouri, Noel, Missouri, Anderson, Missouri, and Branson, Missouri. Property was also purchased near a little-known town called Overland Park, Kansas, with contract and the dream to build Dickinson's finest theatre.

After more expansion, the company decided to move Dickinson's corporate headquarters to Kansas City's suburban Mission, Kansas. At that time, the small city only included a filling station, barber shop, taxi service and bicycle rental shop.

The next ten years became very important for Dickinson Theatres, as the construction of a major motor hotel complex, the Glenwood Manor Motor Hotel, began at 95th and Metcalf, just a short distance away from what would be Dickinson's "Flagship" Glenwood Theatre, already in construction. In 1966, the Glenwood Theatre opened with the Midwest premiere of the popular movie Is Paris Burning?

The "new" Glenwood Theatre received instant recognition for movie theatre comfort, quality and design. Its overwhelming popularity with the public and film companies soon warranted the construction of additional screens and expansion to the complex.

The decade of the 60's also marked the passing of the company's founder, Glen W. Dickinson, Sr. in 1963. The company was passed on to Glen W. Dickinson, Jr. who would go on to run the theatre chain for the next 20 years.

One of the company's most significant milestones occurred in early 1980 when Dickinson Theatres purchased 25 screens from Mann Theatres. The acquisition increased the company's size from 46 screens to 71 screens with operation in 4 states.

Glen W. Dickinson, Jr. died in 1983, leaving the leadership of the company to Kent Dickinson, the second of three sons. The other two, Jon Scott Dickinson and Glen Wood Dickinson III assisted as vice presidents for the company.

Throughout the 80's under Kent Dickinson's administration, existing theatre properties were refurbished and updated with the latest technology. New luxurious theatre complexes were constructed over the next few years and included major multi-plexes in Kansas City, Kansas, Wichita, Kansas, Springfield, Missouri, and Columbia, Missouri.

A change in company direction occurred in October 1992 when Wood Dickinson was named president of Dickinson Theatres.

During Wood Dickinson's appointment to office, Dickinson Theatres opened its first 12-screen motion picture entertainment complex, the SouthGlen Theatre in suburban Overland Park, Kansas, as well as the new Plaza Cinema 6 facility in Leavenworth, Kansas.

In 1995, Dickinson Theatres opened the WestGlen 12 Theatre in Shawnee, Kansas in commemoration of the company's 75th anniversary. The WestGlen 12 Theatre later expanded to include 18 screens.

With a minimum addition of 20 new screens during 1995, Dickinson Theatres was operating 168 screens in 39 locations throughout Mid-America.

In September 1999, Wood Dickinson, the last of the founding family, chose to leave the theater business in order to start Renegade Pictures, LLC, a feature film production company. He was replaced by a team led by John Hartley, Dickinson's head of purchasing. Hartley revived the company's mission to provide the best of family entertainment, which led to a relative rebirth for Dickinson Theaters in the ensuing years.

In October 2011, Dickinson Theaters added National CineMedia to its network affiliates, which has started on December of that year.

In July 2012, John Hartley retired and sold the company to Ron Horton, who, at the time, was executive vice president of film buying and marketing.

The company currently operates 18 theatre locations with 210 screens across 7 states, and is led by Ron Horton.

In October 2014, Liberty, MO-based chain B&B Theatres purchased Dickinson. All of Dickinson's locations are expected to be re-branded under the B&B name.

== Locations ==
=== Arizona ===
- Mesa - Gateway 12 IMAX Theatre
- Goodyear - Palm Valley 14 Theatre

=== Arkansas ===
- Little Rock - Chenal 9 IMAX Theatre

=== Kansas ===
- Emporia - Flint Hills 8 Theatre
- Olathe - Great Mall 16 Theatre
- Hutchinson - Mall 8 Hutchinson Theatre
- Overland Park - Palazzo 16 Theatre
- Shawnee - Westglen 18 Theatre
- Topeka - Dickinson Theatre
- Topeka - Kaw Theatre
- Leavenworth - Landing 5

=== Missouri ===
- Lee's Summit - Eastglen 16 Theatre
- Kansas City - Extreme Screen Union Station
- Kansas City - Northglen 14 Theatre
- Kansas City- cinema 6

=== Nebraska ===
- Hastings - Imperial 3 Theatre

=== Oklahoma ===
- Muskogee - Arrowhead Mall 10 Theatre
- Tulsa - Starworld 20 Theatre

=== Texas ===
- Port Arthur - Central Mall 10 Theatre
