= Winterfest =

Winterfest is the name of various winter festivals held in various parts of North America.

== Fort Lauderdale, Florida ==
The annual Winterfest in Fort Lauderdale, Florida, produces the Seminole Hard Rock Winterfest Boat Parade which is tagged the "Greatest Show on H2O" - founded in 1971, this annual boat parade and festival has earned the title, "The World's Most Watched Boat Parade." Celebrity grand marshals and 100 decorated boats entertain 1 million spectators along the 12-mile waterway parade route in December.

== Lowell, Massachusetts ==
The annual Winterfest in Lowell, Massachusetts, is a festival that started in 2001. The two-day festival is held following Super Bowl week in downtown Lowell. In the Soup Bowl Competition, local restaurant chefs create original recipes that are rated by festival attendees.

Other Winterfest activities include children's entertainment, hot food, drink, live music, free ice skating at Tsongas Arena, a hay ride, a snowman building contest, and an art show of works by local artists. Musical performers have included the Joshua Tree. The festival ends with a fireworks display that organizers claim rivals those on the Fourth of July.

== Beloit, Wisconsin ==
Similar to Lowell, Massachusetts', Winterfest, the Beloit festival ranges in location from the Eclipse Center to Riverside Park and downtown. Events include an indoor playland, ice skating on the lagoon, ice sculpting and toboggan races. All events take place in the city of Beloit.

== Wausau, Wisconsin ==
The annual Winter Fest in Wausau, Wisconsin, is a festival that was founded in 2012 by Wausau Events, Inc. Activities for all ages are offered at sites throughout downtown Wausau and typically include horse-drawn wagon rides, art projects, cookie decorating, a snow sculptures, ice skating, and more.

== Gatlinburg, Tennessee ==
A festival in Gatlinburg, Tennessee, this Winterfest takes place from Friday, February 18 - Sunday, February 20. Unlike the other Winterfests, this one is a youth gathering for teenagers from Churches of Christ. It includes three 2 1/2 – 3 hour worship sessions on Friday night, Saturday afternoon, and Sunday morning. Usually, entertainment such as magicians or comedians will be brought in; besides the gatherings, visitors have periods of time for relaxation and recreation when they may go to places such as restaurants, arcades, and other fun activities. This gathering has birthed additional regional "Winterfests" in Texas and Arizona.

== Newaygo, Michigan ==
The annual Winterfest in Newaygo, is a backyard wrestling event started in 2002 as an annual major event put on by the Newaygo Wrestling Organization (nWo). Since its 2002 inception, the nWo has put on five more events, with the most recent in January 2011.

== Coventry, Rhode Island ==
The annual Winterfest in Coventry, Rhode Island, is a bacchanalian celebration of the oppressive cold of New England winters. It is intended to bring the arrival of spring through drink and food. Established in 2012.

== Philadelphia, Pennsylvania ==
Winterfest in Philadelphia is at the Blue Cross RiverRink, a skating rink and outdoor event facility located at Penn's Landing. During the winter months it hosts the Blue Cross RiverRink WinterFest, featuring winter-themed decorations, fire pits, and an outdoor beer garden. The first Winterfest was held in 2013, conceived by Avram Hornik of FCM Hospitality, who also owns the neighboring outdoor waterfront restaurant, Morgan's Pier. During the summer months, the ice rink is converted into a roller skating rink under the name SummerFest.

== Vaughan, Ontario, Canada ==
Winterfest

== See also ==
- Winterval - a controversial season of public events organised by the city council of Birmingham in 1997 and 1998
- Winterlude - a winter festival held annually in the Canadian National Capital Region
- Winter Formal - a high school event similar to prom
