= Arrowhead 135 =

Annual ultramarathon event in International Falls, Minnesota, USA

- Date: Late January or early February
- Location: International Falls, Minnesota, U.S.
- Event type: Ultramarathon trail foot/ski/bike
- Distance: 135-mile (217 km)
- Established: 2005
- Organizer: Ken and Jackie Krueger
- Course records: Jake Hegge (ft) 28:27 (2022); Gretchen Metsa (ft) 33:05 (2022); Grant Halvorson (ski) 20:27 (2025); Shalane Frost (ski) 20:41 (2022); Jorden Wakeley (bike) 11:43 (2019); Jill Martindale (bike) 16:40 (2017)
- Website: http://www.arrowheadultra.com/

The Arrowhead 135 is a yearly ultramarathon event which takes place in International Falls, Minnesota, United States.

== Course and race ==
The trail is 135 miles on Arrowhead State Trail from Kerry Park arena in International Falls, MN to Tower, MN Fortune Bay Casino. Modes of transportation includes foot, ski or bicycle, and the race is held in late January or early February.

Temperatures along the course reach as low as −45 °F (−43 °C) degrees.

Arrowhead 135 is a self-supported race with limited checkpoints, requiring extensive supplies to be carried with the racer. The roster is limited in order to maintain solitude on the trail during the race.

Profits from the race go to the Special Operations Warrior Foundation Charity, Together For Good and the Falls Hunger Coalition.

An "unsupported" option allows participants to choose to complete the race unsupported, meaning they are not allowed to accept help or stop at any of the checkpoints along the way.

Although not sanctioned by the event, some choose to complete the event in both directions making it a "Double Arrowhead".

== History and records ==
Arrowhead 135 is known as one of the toughest 50 races in the world. As many as 80% fail to finish the race, with a low of 20% finishing in 2007. In a typical year less than 50 percent of the participants finish. It was started in 2005 with 10 people, and the format of the race has been largely unchanged.

The race gathered extra attention in 2014 and 2019 due to the polar vortex which caused extreme cold in the midwest those years.

In 2014 an adventure film documentary was made about the race.

=== Notable finishes ===
- Jordan Wakeley set the all time record of 11 hours and 43 minutes in 2019 with an average speed of 11 miles (18 km)/h throughout the race.
- John Storkamp finished his 17th Arrowhead 135 in 2026.
- Erwin “Erv” Berglund is the oldest person to finish Arrowhead 135.
- Chris Scotch finished the first Double Arrowhead in 2013 taking 6 days, 8 hours, 16 minutes to go the 270 miles with all required gear.
- Roberto Marron is the second to finish the Double Arrowhead in 2014.
- Kate Coward and Kari Gibbons are the first women to accomplish a double Arrowhead.
- Sveta Vold completed the race in 2016 while stopping to breastfeed along the way, completing as third place woman.
- Mike Brumbaugh placed 1st with all time ski record in 2016 despite breaking a pole 20 miles into the race.
- Shalane Frost beat the existing women's ski record by 14 hours and the overall ski record by 16 minutes in the 2022 race.

== a'Trois award ==
All who finish Arrowhead 135 three times, once in each discipline including bike/run/ski, are eligible for Arrowhead a'Trois award. As of January 2020, 18 have been awarded.

The first athletes completing the award in 2011 were Jeremy Kershaw, Tim Roe, and Matt Maxwell.

== Order of the Hrimthurs ==
All those who complete the Tuscobia Winter Ultra (160 Mile), Arrowhead 135 and Actif Epica (any solo distance) in one season are allowed into the Order of the Hrimthurs. Names are maintained by Actif Epica.

Arrowhead 135 race director Ken Krueger earned placement in the order of the Hrimthurs in 2018.

Known as the most difficult individual award of the winter.
