= Eclipse Center =

Coordinates: 42.5171°N 89.0331°W

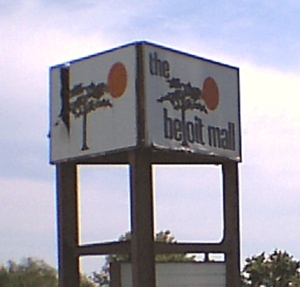
- Eclipse Center sign
- Location: Beloit, Wisconsin, United States
- Address: Riverside Drive and Henry Avenue
- Opened: 1966
- Closed: 2000 (as a shopping mall)
- Num. of stores: More than 60 (at opening)

The Eclipse Center is a mixed-use complex in Beloit, Wisconsin, developed from the former Beloit Plaza and Beloit Mall. The shopping center opened in 1966, was enclosed and renamed in 1981, and closed as a mall in 2000. After the property was acquired in 2004, Eclipse Center was established in 2007 for public, educational, commercial, and event uses. The Lincoln Academy opened at the site in 2021; an expansion approved in 2026 is expected to include demolition of the Eclipse Event Center.

== History ==
Beloit Plaza opened in 1966 with more than 60 stores and services, making it the first major shopping center in Rock County. A roof was completed over the center in 1981, when it was renamed Beloit Mall.

The mall closed in 2000 apart from the Elder-Beerman department store. Ken and Diane Hendricks acquired the property in 2004 and established Eclipse Center in March 2007. Its name referred to the Eclipse Windmill Company, a historic Beloit manufacturer.

The city converted the former JCPenney building into the 63,419-square-foot (5,891.8 m^{2}) Beloit Public Library, completed in 2009. Renovation elsewhere in the complex began in June 2010. The former Sears space had been redeveloped by 2011, and a final phase involving the center court, facade, and an open courtyard was announced for 2015.

The closing of the Beloit Elder-Beerman was announced in January 2018. In 2020, demolition of the former Kohl's and vacant northeastern portions of the complex began to make way for The Lincoln Academy, planned as a freestanding building rather than an attached part of Eclipse Center. The 115,000-square-foot (10,700 m^{2}) independent charter school was constructed between June 2020 and July 2021.

On January 5, 2026, the Beloit City Council approved a development agreement for the third phase of The Lincoln Academy's expansion. The academy's board approved moving forward with the project on February 4. Reporting that month said that the Eclipse Event Center was slated for demolition as part of the expansion. By June, the school had capacity for about 730 students and expected to double in size when the expansion was completed in 2027.
