= B&B Theatres =

American movie theater chain

B&B Theatres Operating Company, Inc.

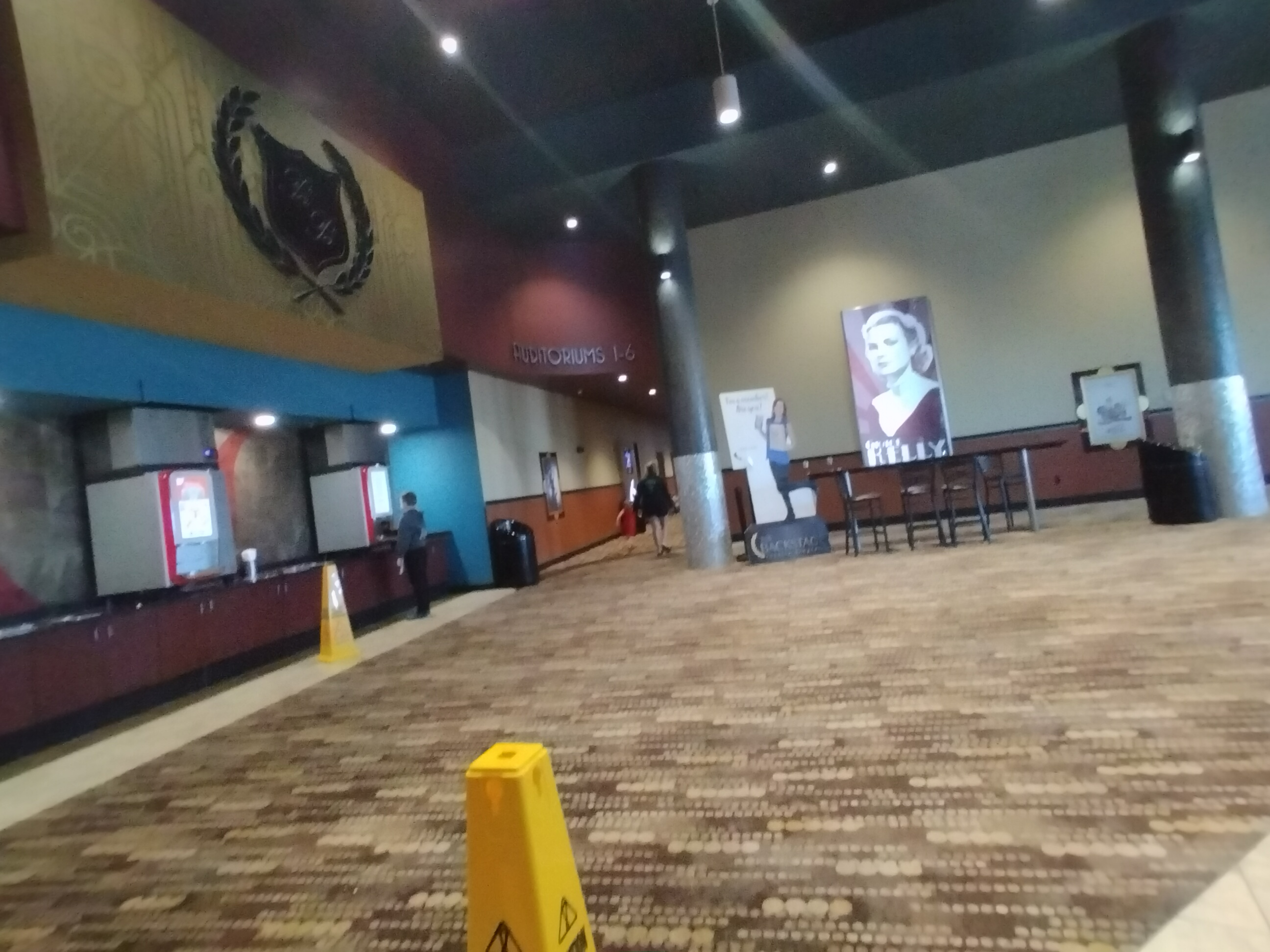
- Interior of a B&B Theatres location in Wentzville, Missouri, 2023
- Type: Private
- Traded as: B&B Theatres
- Industry: Entertainment (movie theatres)
- Founded: 1924; 102 years ago in Salisbury, Missouri
- Founder: Elmer Bills, Sr.
- Headquarters: Liberty, Missouri, U.S.
- Number of locations: 54
- Key people: Bob Bagby (president and CEO)
- Owner: Bagby family
- Website: bbtheatres.com

B&B Theatres Operating Company, Inc. or simply B&B Theatres, is a family-owned and operated American movie theater chain based in Liberty, Missouri. Founded in 1924, B&B is the fifth-largest theater chain in the United States, operating 500+ screens at 54 locations in 14 US states. The company also maintains offices in Salisbury, Missouri and Fulton, Missouri.

== History ==
In 1924, Missourian Elmer Bills, Sr., founded Bills Theaters in Salisbury, Missouri. Elmer Sr. met his wife Johnnie when he purchased the Lyric Theater in Salisbury, where she was the piano player for the silent films. Their son Elmer Bills, Jr. was born a few years later. In 1959, Elmer Jr. graduated from the University of Missouri and married one of his "popcorn girls", Amy. The two generations of Bills continued the expansion of the company, and welcomed the birth of Elmer Jr. and Amy's daughter, Bridget. Sterling Bagby went to work for Elmer Sr. as a concession clerk at age 10 in 1936. After serving a stint in World War II, Bagby returned to Missouri and married a ticket seller from Higbee, Pauline. Together, the Bagbys started the Bagby Traveling Picture Show. The Show was, in essence, a portable movie theater, and the Bagbys traveled along with the equipment (including seats, snack bar, film, and projectors) showing movies in schools and barns. Their company became a Kansas circuit of both drive-ins and "hardtop" indoor movie theaters. Sterling and Pauline have three children: Steve, Bob, and Paula.

The two companies formally merged after years of friendship and combined efforts as B&B (Bills and Bagby) Theaters on January 1, 1980, making the Fulton Cinema the first official B&B Theatre. Just months earlier in 1979, Bob Bagby married Bridget Bills and cemented the convergence of the two companies. Sterling died in October 2000, and the remaining family run the National Association of Theatre Owners-recognized Midwest chain. From 2000 to 2014 B&B replaced several of their existing locations with new facilities as well as acquired, remodeled, or built several new locations. In 2010 B&B premiered their first PLF (premium large format) Grand Screen® and their first dine-in Marquee Suites® concept auditoriums.

In October 2014, B&B purchased Overland Park, Kansas-based operator Dickinson Theatres.

== Digital cinema ==
In September 2009, B&B Theatres announced that it had selected Christie Digital Systems to supply 2K digital projectors for the circuit's transition to RealD 3D-capable digital cinema. The digital conversion was completed by August 2012.

== Locations ==
The company operates theaters in 14 US states, including Florida, Georgia, Iowa, Kansas, Minnesota, Mississippi, Missouri, Nebraska, North Carolina, Ohio, Oklahoma, South Carolina, Texas, Virginia, and Washington with one brand new one coming to American Dream in New Jersey.

B&B Theaters previously operated in North Carolina, with one location in Morrisville. B&B took over the location in 2021 and closed it on January 4, 2026, to make way for new development.

== See also ==
- List of movie theater chains
