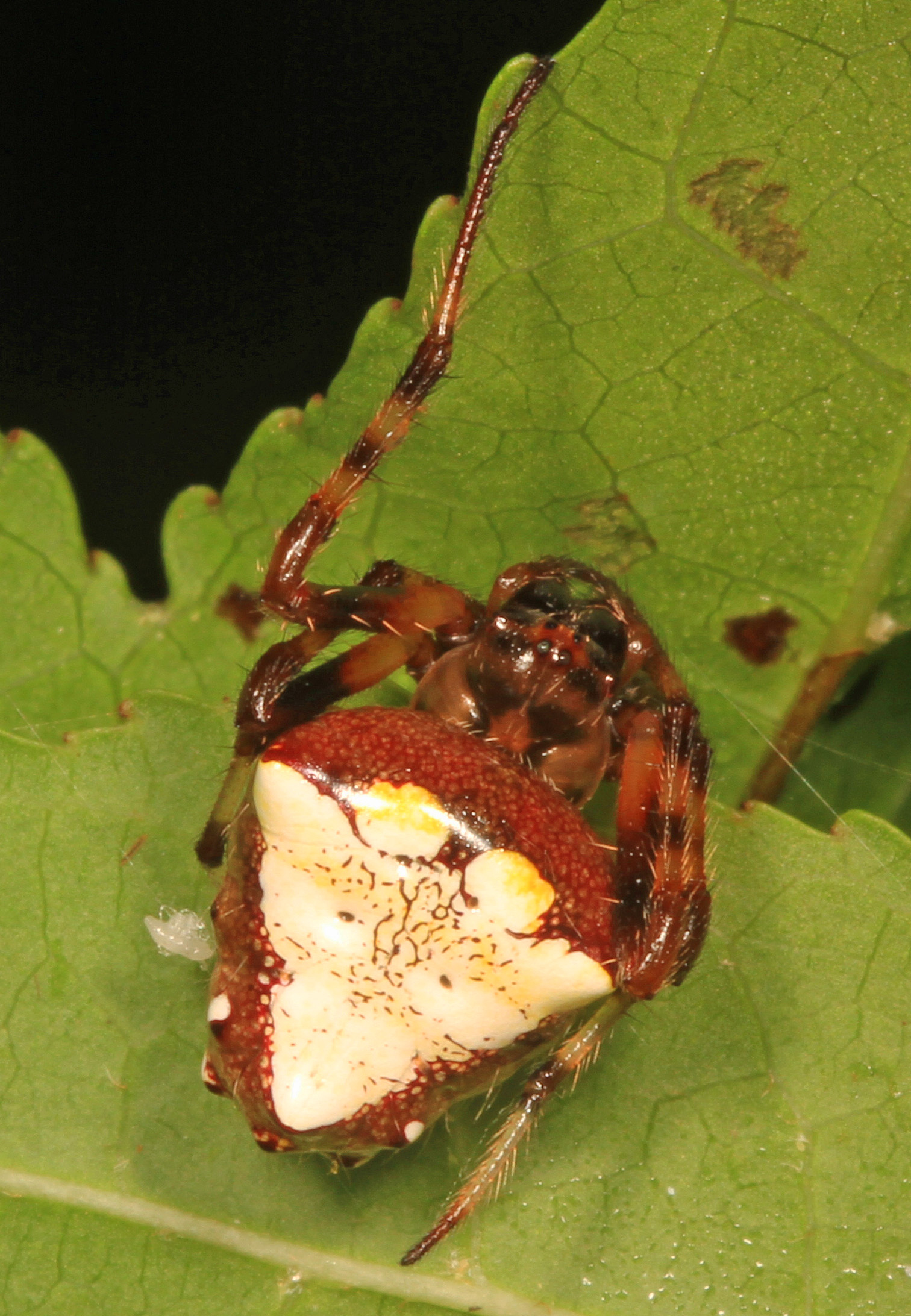
- V. arenata

Scientific classification
- Domain: Eukaryota
- Kingdom: Animalia
- Phylum: Arthropoda
- Subphylum: Chelicerata
- Class: Arachnida
- Order: Araneae
- Infraorder: Araneomorphae
- Family: Araneidae
- Genus: Verrucosa; McCook, 1888

Type species
- V. arenata (Walckenaer, 1841)

Species
- 45, see text

= Verrucosa =

Genus of spiders

Verrucosa is a genus of orb-weaver spiders first described by Henry McCook in 1888. It contains almost fifty described species, most of which live in South America. The only species in the United States is the arrowhead spider.

== Species ==
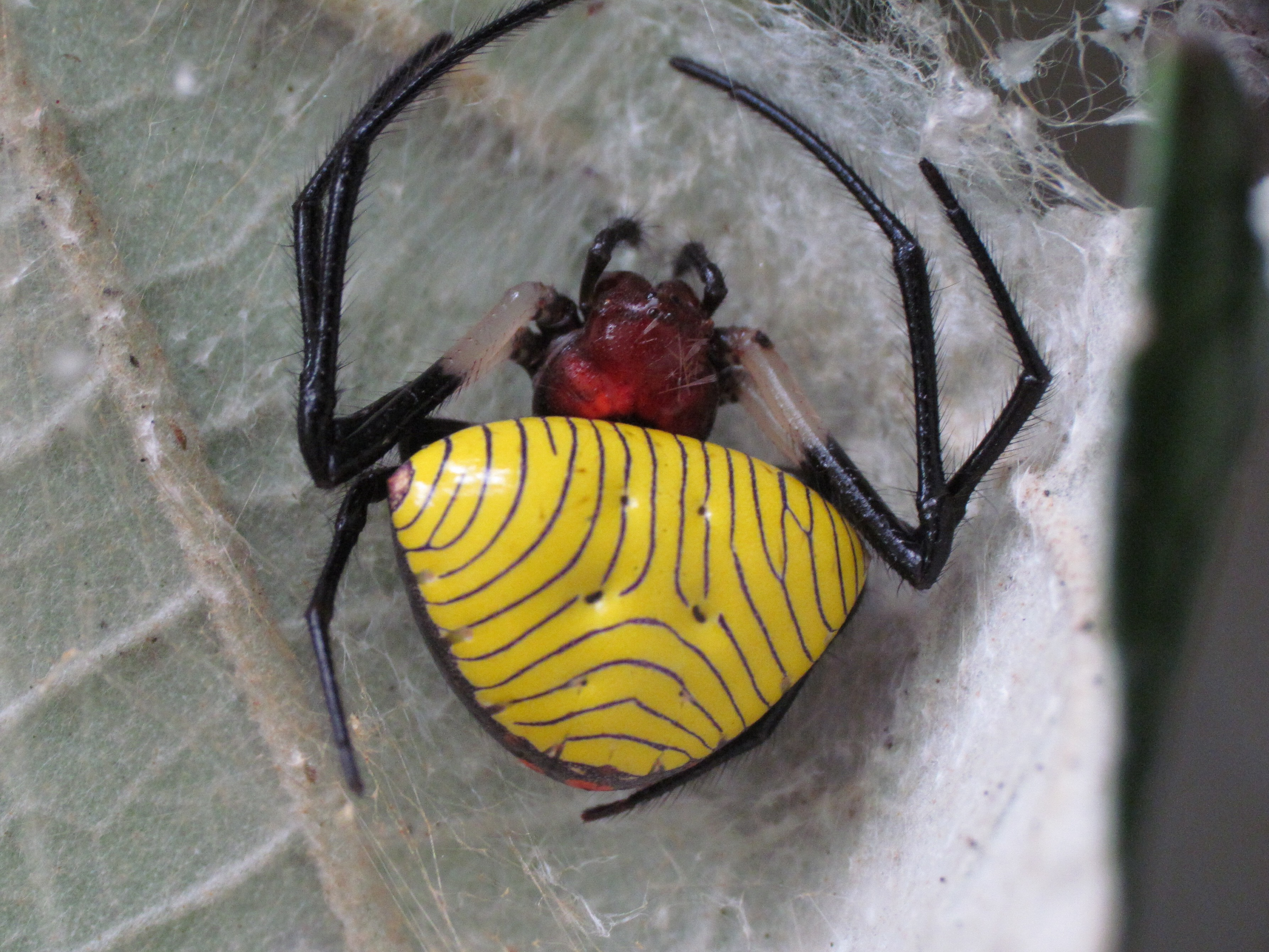
Verrucosa zebra female from São Paulo, Brazil

As of April 2019 it contains forty-five species:

- Verrucosa alvarengai Lise, Kesster & Silva, 2015 – Brazil
- Verrucosa apuela Lise, Kesster & Silva, 2015 – Ecuador
- Verrucosa arenata (Walckenaer, 1841) (type) – USA to Panama, Greater Antilles
- Verrucosa avilesae Lise, Kesster & Silva, 2015 – Ecuador, Colombia
- Verrucosa bartica Lise, Kesster & Silva, 2015 – Guyana
- Verrucosa benavidesae Lise, Kesster & Silva, 2015 – Colombia, Peru
- Verrucosa brachiscapa Lise, Kesster & Silva, 2015 – Ecuador
- Verrucosa cachimbo Lise, Kesster & Silva, 2015 – Brazil
- Verrucosa cajamarca Lise, Kesster & Silva, 2015 – Peru
- Verrucosa caninde Lise, Kesster & Silva, 2015 – Brazil
- Verrucosa canje Lise, Kesster & Silva, 2015 – Guyana
- Verrucosa carara Lise, Kesster & Silva, 2015 – Costa Rica
- Verrucosa chanchamayo Lise, Kesster & Silva, 2015 – Peru
- Verrucosa coroico Lise, Kesster & Silva, 2015 – Bolivia
- Verrucosa cuyabenoensis Lise, Kesster & Silva, 2015 – Ecuador, Bolivia
- Verrucosa cuyuni Lise, Kesster & Silva, 2015 – Guyana
- Verrucosa cylicophora (Badcock, 1932) – Brazil, Paraguay
- Verrucosa excavata Lise, Kesster & Silva, 2015 – Colombia
- Verrucosa florezi Lise, Kesster & Silva, 2015 – Colombia
- Verrucosa galianoae Lise, Kesster & Silva, 2015 – Brazil
- Verrucosa guatopo Lise, Kesster & Silva, 2015 – Venezuela
- Verrucosa hoferi Lise, Kesster & Silva, 2015 – Brazil
- Verrucosa lampra (Soares & Camargo, 1948) – Brazil
- Verrucosa lata Lise, Kesster & Silva, 2015 – Brazil
- Verrucosa latigastra Lise, Kesster & Silva, 2015 – Guyana, Brazil
- Verrucosa levii Lise, Kesster & Silva, 2015 – Brazil
- Verrucosa macarena Lise, Kesster & Silva, 2015 – Colombia
- Verrucosa manauara Lise, Kesster & Silva, 2015 – Brazil
- Verrucosa meridionalis (Keyserling, 1892) – Brazil, Argentina
- Verrucosa meta Lise, Kesster & Silva, 2015 – Colombia
- Verrucosa opon Lise, Kesster & Silva, 2015 – Colombia
- Verrucosa pedrera Lise, Kesster & Silva, 2015 – Colombia
- Verrucosa rancho Lise, Kesster & Silva, 2015 – Venezuela
- Verrucosa reticulata (O. Pickard-Cambridge, 1889) – Panama
- Verrucosa rhea Lise, Kesster & Silva, 2015 – Brazil
- Verrucosa scapofracta Lise, Kesster & Silva, 2015 – Brazil, Argentina
- Verrucosa septemmammata Caporiacco, 1954 – French Guiana
- Verrucosa sergipana Lise, Kesster & Silva, 2015 – Brazil
- Verrucosa silvae Lise, Kesster & Silva, 2015 – Colombia, Peru
- Verrucosa simla Lise, Kesster & Silva, 2015 – Trinidad
- Verrucosa suaita Lise, Kesster & Silva, 2015 – Colombia
- Verrucosa tarapoa Lise, Kesster & Silva, 2015 – Ecuador, Colombia, Brazil
- Verrucosa tuberculata Lise, Kesster & Silva, 2015 – Colombia
- Verrucosa undecimvariolata (O. Pickard-Cambridge, 1889) – Mexico to Argentina
- Verrucosa zebra (Keyserling, 1892) – Brazil, Argentina

Verrucosa furcifera (Keyserling, 1886) from Queensland, Australia was placed in this genus due to its strong outer similarity. However, it is considered misplaced, and is now Carepalxis furcifera.
