= Sitka Sound =

Body of water in southeastern Alaska

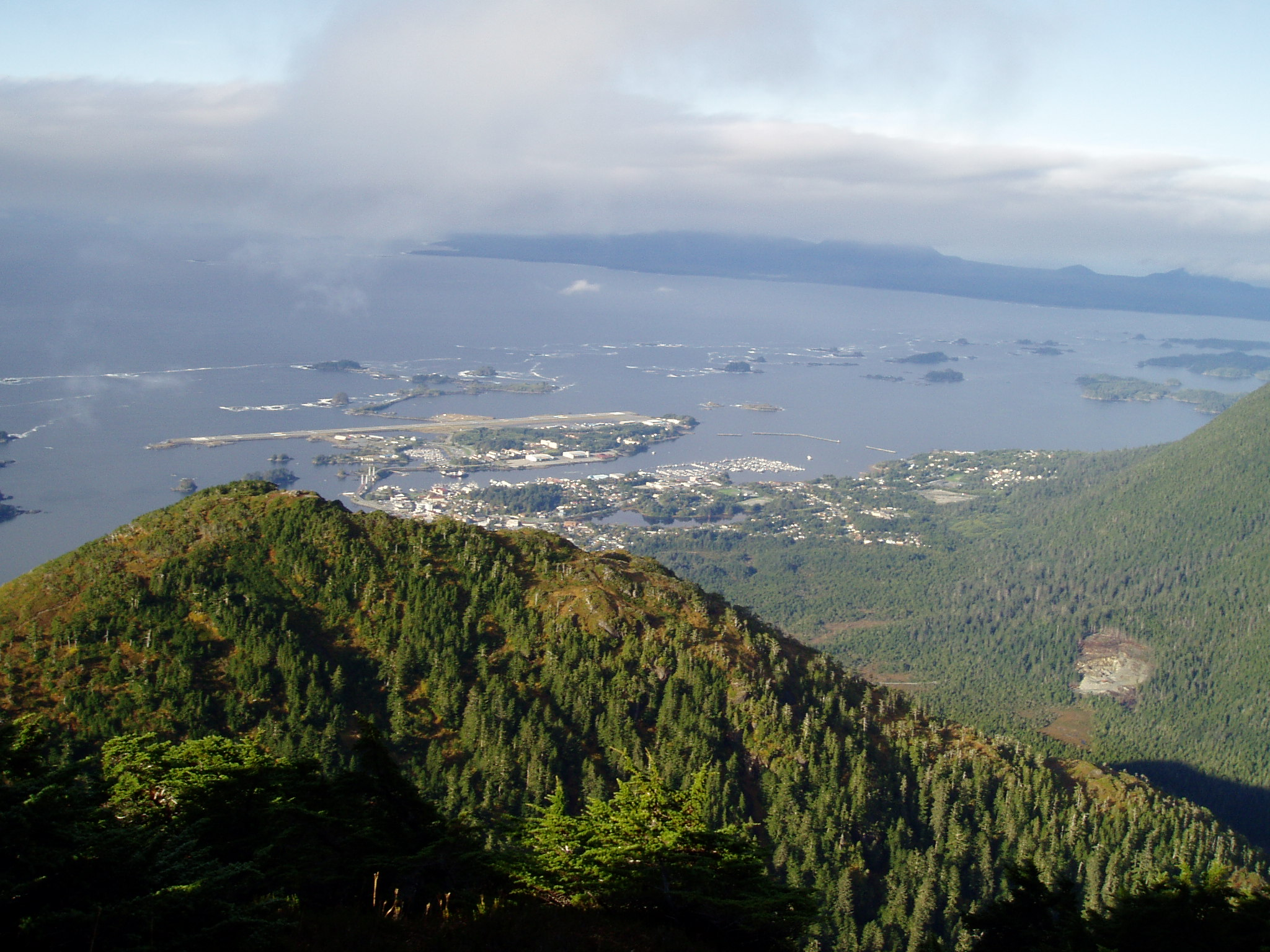
- Sitka Sound with Mount Verstovia in the foreground.

- Location within Alaska
- Coordinates: 56°58′22″N 135°29′27″W
- Type: Sound (geography)

Sitka Sound is a body of water near the city of Sitka, Alaska. It is bordered by Baranof Island to the south and the northeast, by Kruzof Island to the northwest and by the Pacific Ocean to the southwest. During the early 19th century it was a major locus of the maritime fur trade.

== Naming history ==
Sitka Sound was named Ensenada de Susto by Juan de la Bodega on 15 August 1775. It was later named Norfolk Sound by James Cook. In 1801, Fleurieu published a map naming it Baie Tchinkîtâné in an attempt to use Tlingit toponyms.
