= The Sisters (Alaska) =

Mountain in Alaska, United States

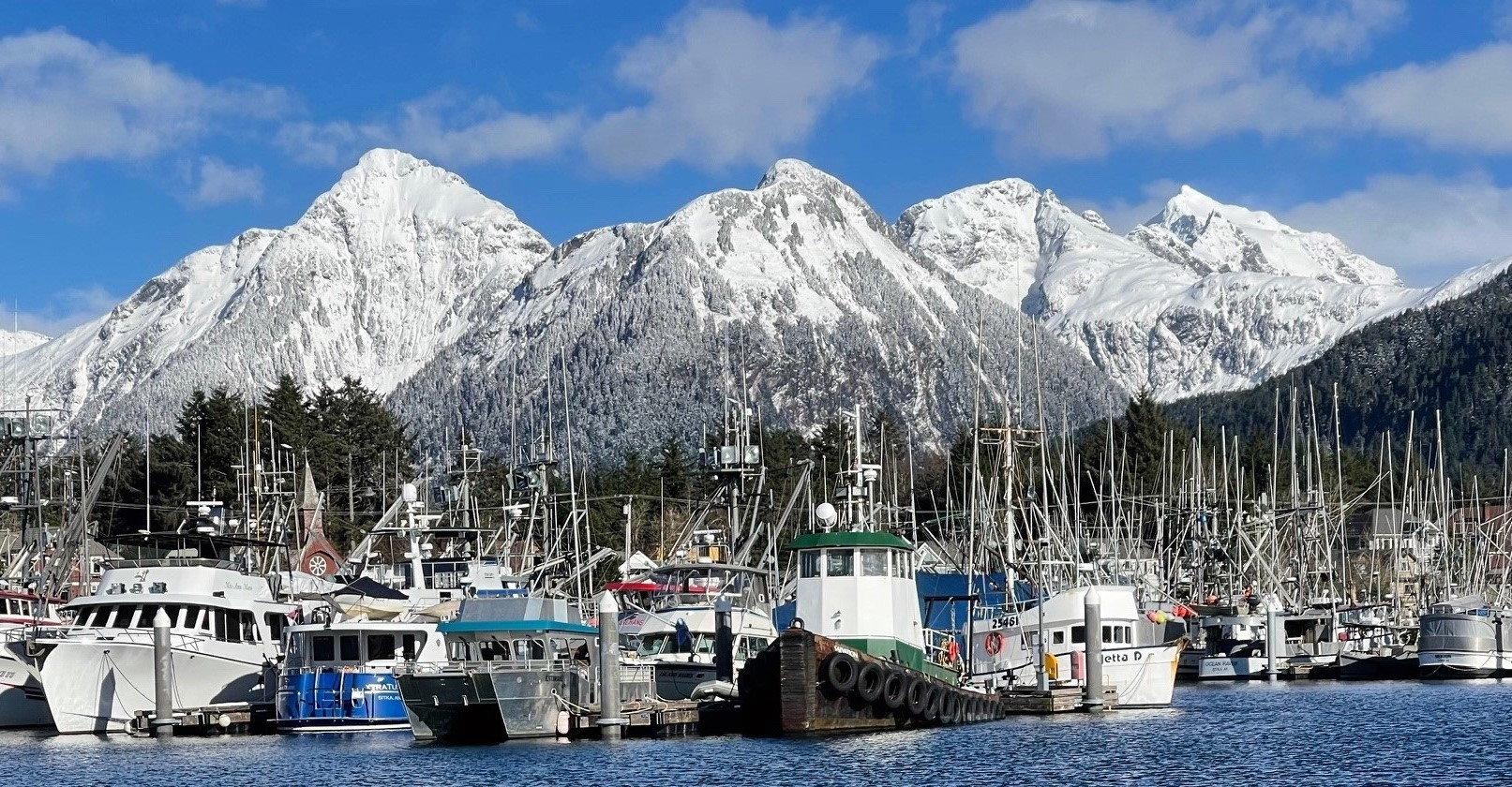
- Southwest aspect from Crescent Harbor, Sitka

Highest point
- Elevation: 3,838 ft (1,170 m)
- Prominence: 459 ft (140 m)
- Isolation: 1.67 mi (2.69 km)
- Coordinates: 57°06′02″N 135°13′12″W

Geography
- Location within Alaska
- Interactive map of The Sisters
- Location: Sitka city-borough
- Country: United States
- State: Alaska
- Protected area: Tongass National Forest
- Parent range: Alexander Archipelago
- Topo map: USGS Sitka A-4

The Sisters are mountain summits in Alaska, United States.

== Description ==
The Sisters are located on the west coast of Baranof Island, approximately five miles (8.0 km) northeast of Sitka. The highest peak reaches an elevation of 3,838 feet (1,170 m). This mountain group is part of the Alexander Archipelago and is set on land managed by Tongass National Forest. Precipitation runoff from the mountain drains to the Indian River and Sitka Sound. Topographic relief is significant as the north slope rises over 3,400 feet (1,036 meters) above an unnamed creek in one mile (1.6 km). The landform's local name was published in 1916 by U.S. Coast and Geodetic Survey, and the toponym has been officially adopted by the U.S. Board on Geographic Names.

== Climate ==
Based on the Köppen climate classification, The Sisters is located in a subpolar oceanic climate zone with long, cold, snowy winters, and cool summers. Weather systems coming off the Gulf of Alaska are forced upwards by the mountains (orographic lift), causing heavy precipitation in the form of rainfall and snowfall. Winter temperatures can drop below 10 °F with wind chill factors below 0 °F.

== Gallery ==
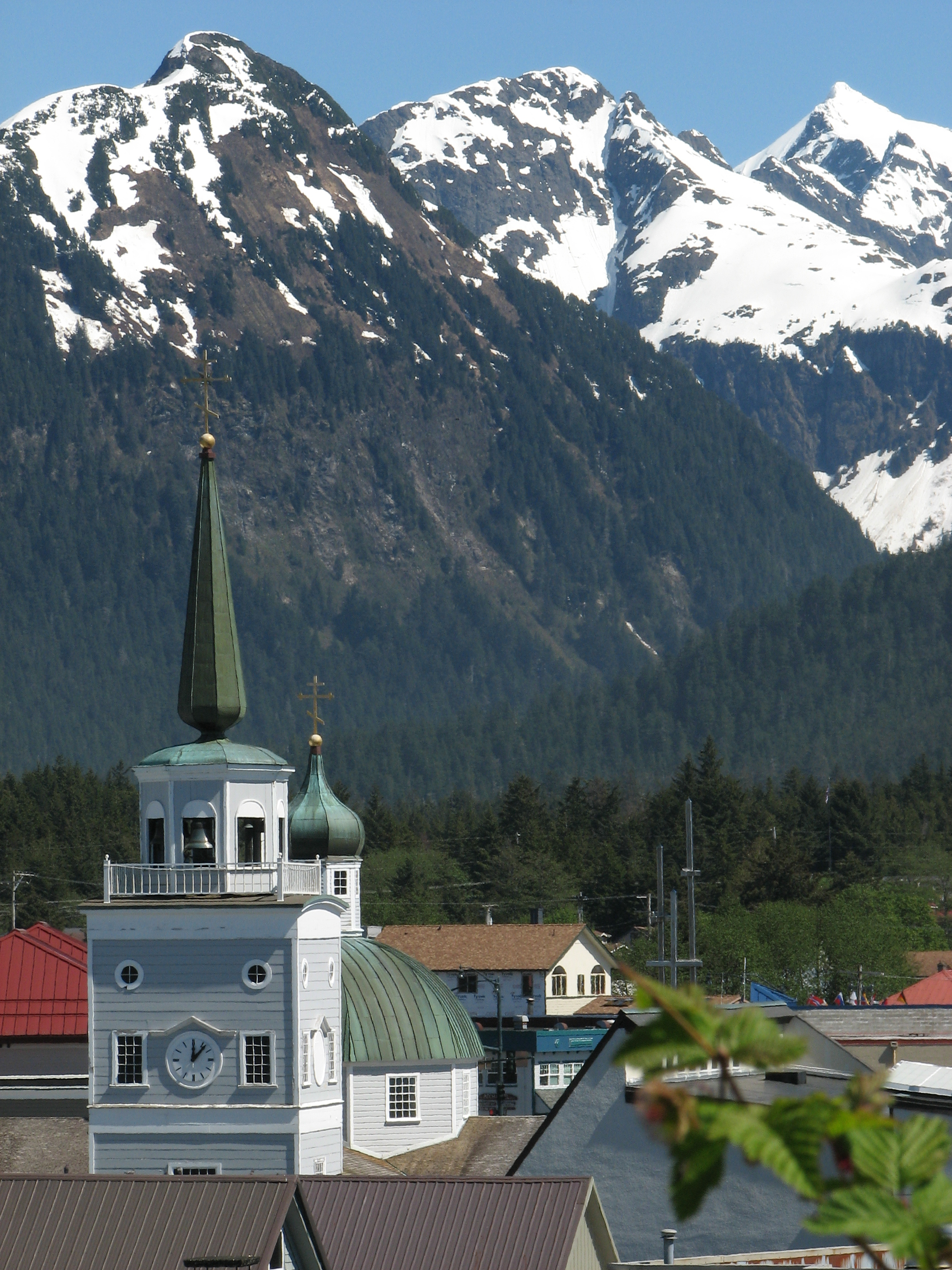

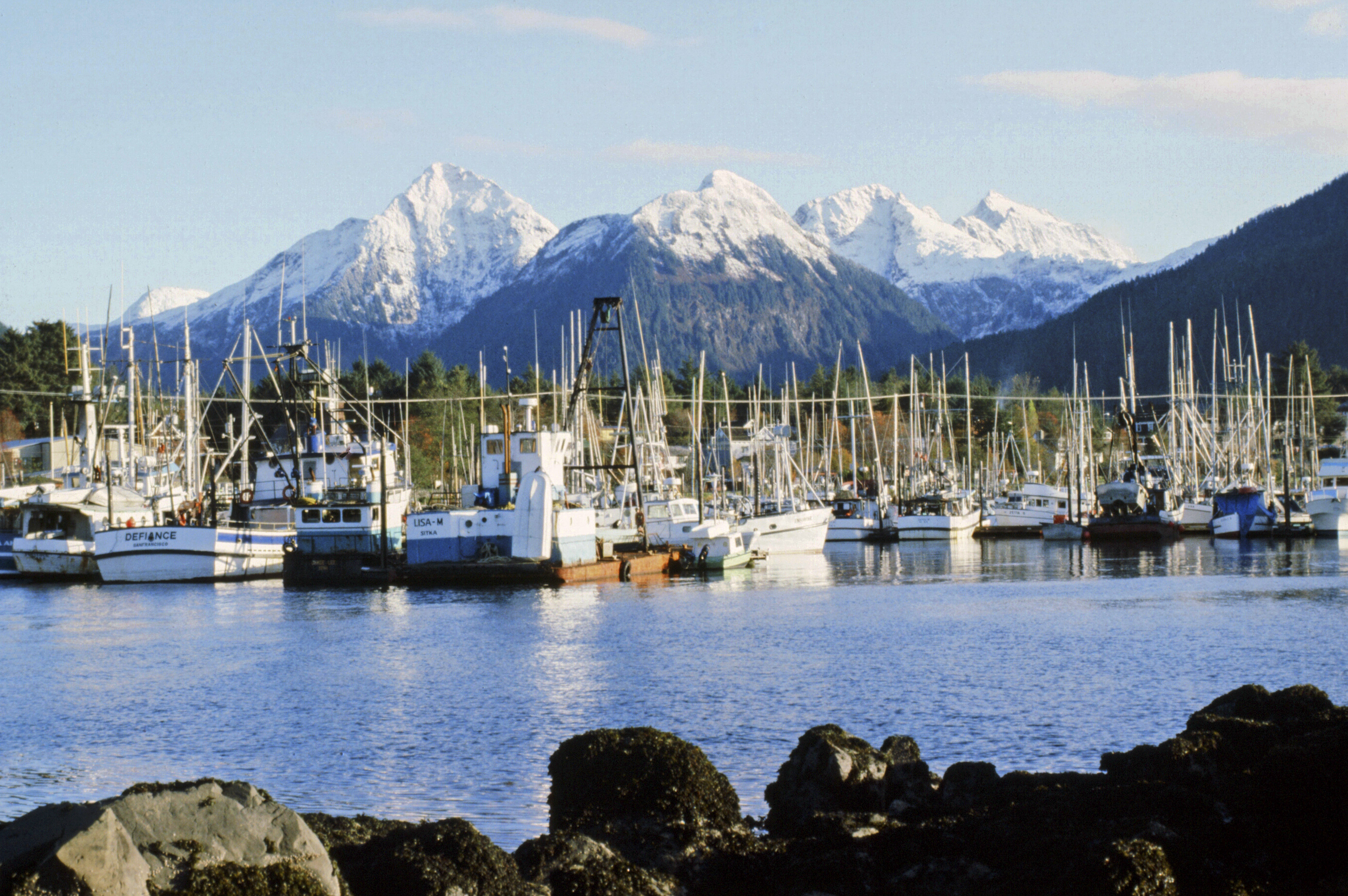

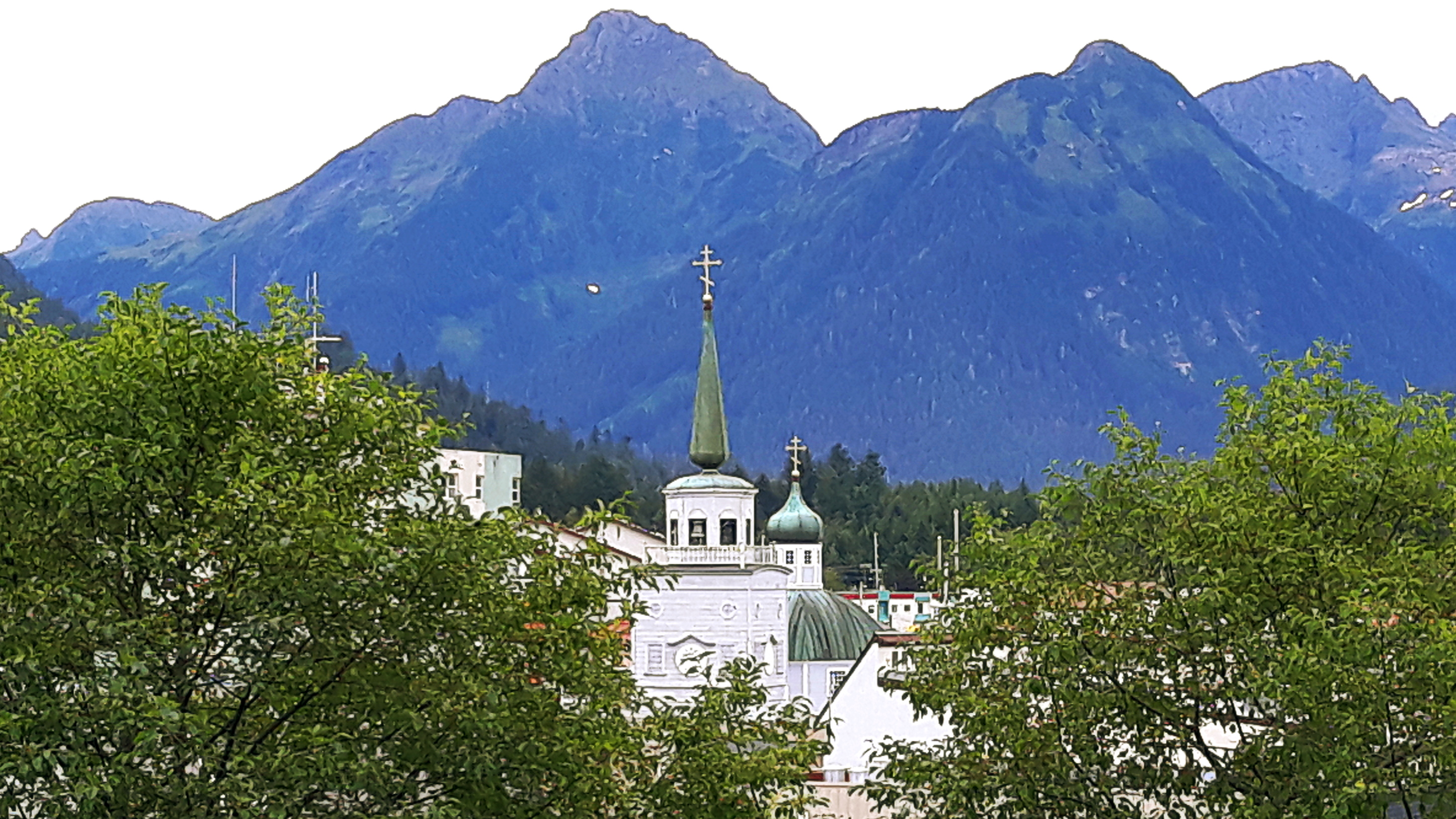

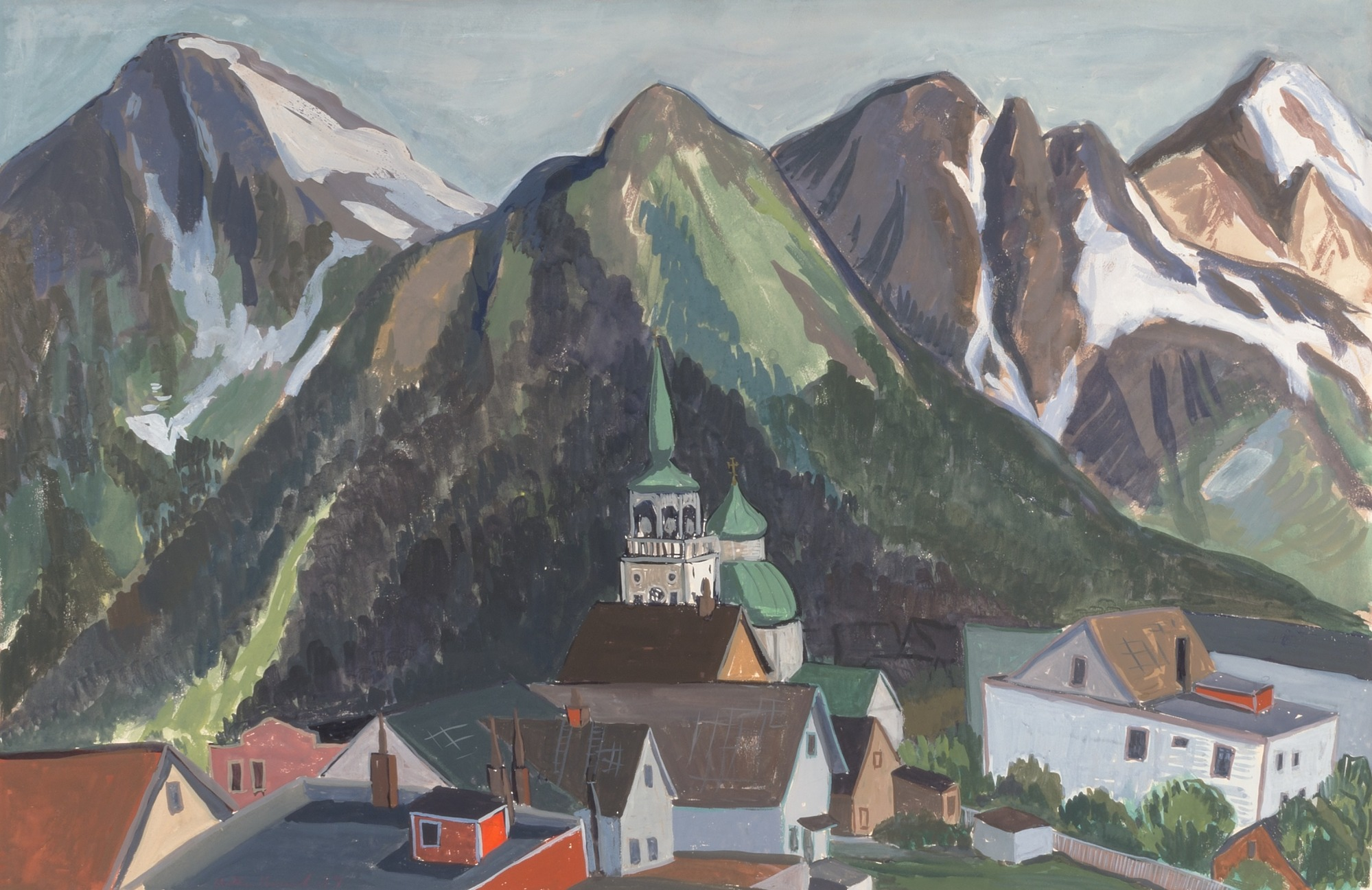
1938 painting

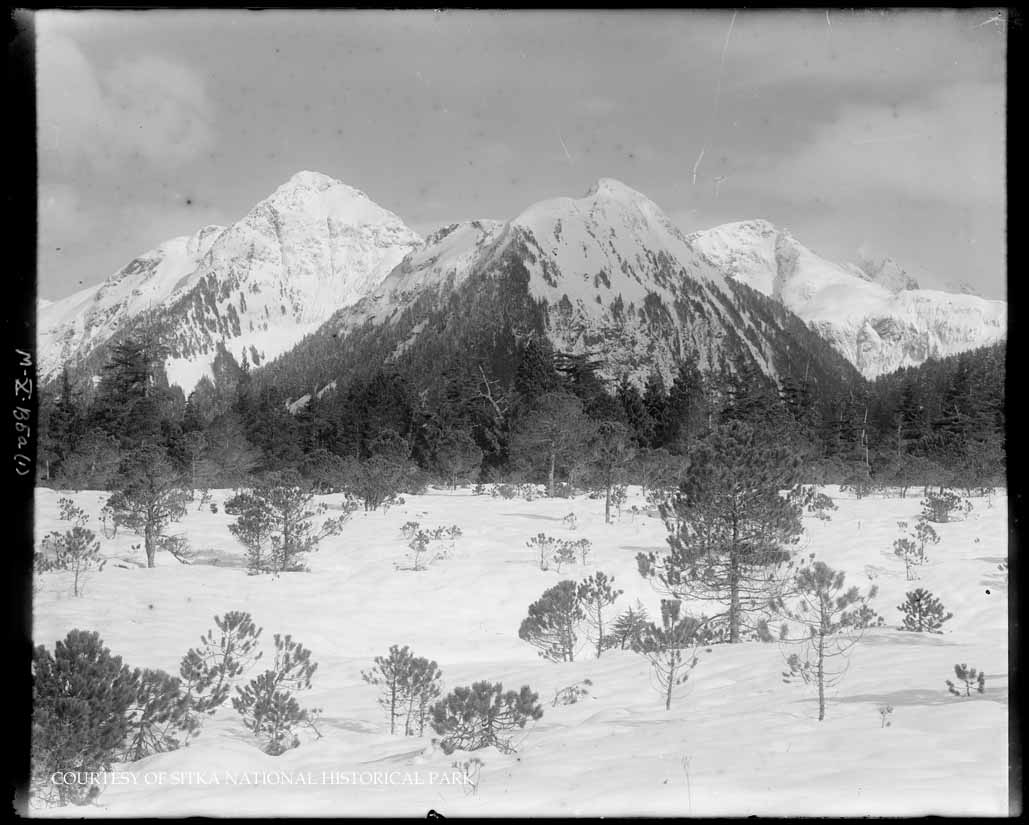

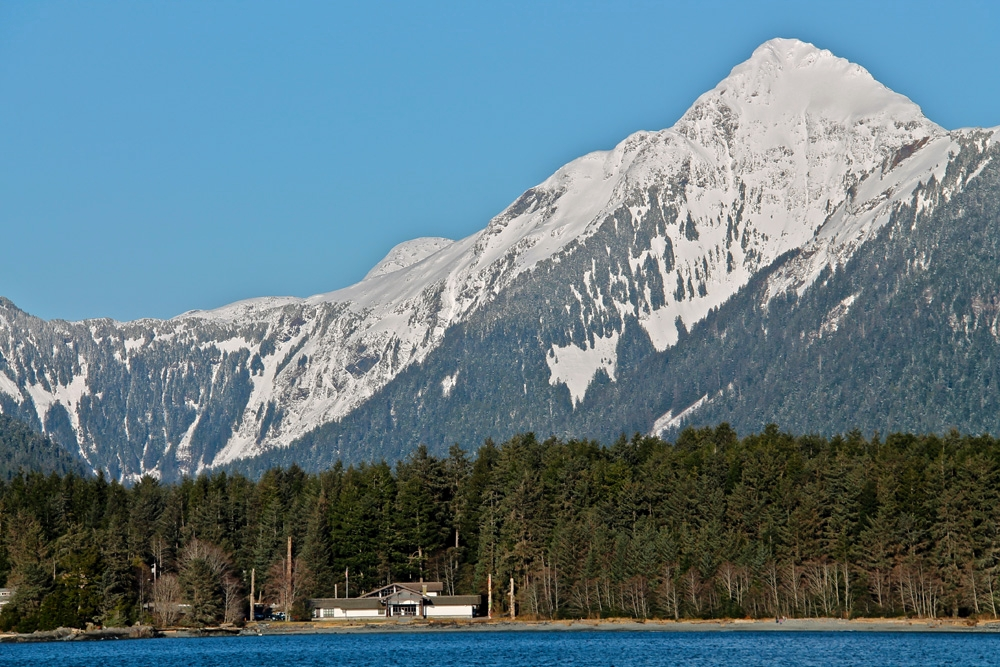
Northwest peak

== See also ==
- List of mountain peaks of Alaska
- Geography of Alaska
