= The Great Mall of the Great Plains =

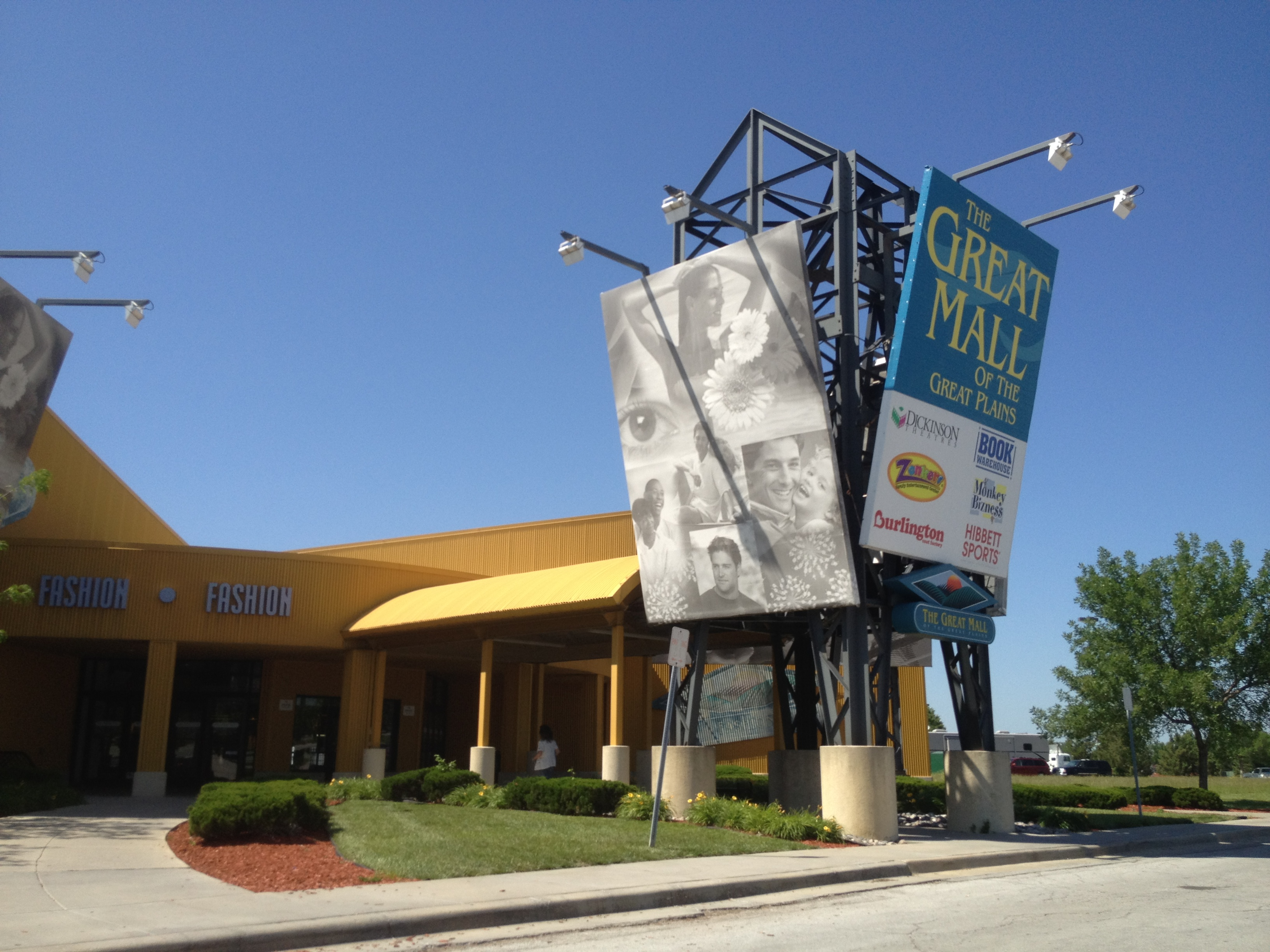
- Entrance to The Great Mall of the Great Plains, May 2012
- Coordinates: 38°51′29″N 94°49′16″W
- Address: 20700 West 151st Street; Olathe, Kansas 66061
- Opened: August 14, 1997: Dillard's, Marshalls, Oshman's SuperSports USA, and Burlington: July 25, 1997
- Closed: September 18, 2015 (demolished July 11, 2016 - January 2017)
- Developer: Glimcher Realty Trust and Jordan Robert Perlmutter & Co.
- Manager: Mark Levin
- Owner: Garmin LTD.
- Floor area: 783,010 sq ft (72,744 m^{2})
- Floors: 1
- Parking: Parking Lot

The Great Mall of the Great Plains was a shopping mall located in Olathe, Kansas, United States. Opened in 1997, it was the largest outlet mall in the state of Kansas, and boasted over 150 stores and 10 anchors, laid out in a half-mile racetrack pattern. Amenities included indoor glow-in-the-dark miniature golf course, a food court, a Game Zone arcade, and a Dickinson Theatres movie theater with sixteen screens. Great Mall of the Great Plains was owned & managed by Glimcher Properties Trust until January 2009. Although the mall attracted one million customers during its first few months of operation, it struggled due to the economic downturn and changes in customer's shopping habits. After years of decline, the mall closed on September 18, 2015. Demolition on the mall began on July 11, 2016, and was finished in January 2017. While developers announced in January 2018 that a redevelopment called Mentum would replace the old mall, this never happened. In October 2021, Olathe-based company Garmin Ltd. indicated that it acquired the property, likely to expand its company's headquarters.

== History ==
Great Mall of the Great Plains was co-developed by Glimcher Realty Trust and Jordan Robert Perlmutter & Co. The mall was intended to feature a "value oriented megamall" with a mix of outlet stores, traditional mall stores, big box retail, and entertainment venues, comparable to malls developed by the former Mills Corporation. Construction began on the Great Mall of the Great Plains in 1996. The mall was originally slated to open in March 1997 but did not open until August 14 of that year due to leasing issues with several tenants. When the mall opened, it had a total of 150 stores including 11 anchor stores: Burlington Coat Factory, Dillard's, DSW (Designer Shoe Warehouse), Eddie Bauer Outlet, Foozles Bookstore, Group USA Clothing Company, Kitchen and Co., Linens 'n Things, Marshalls, Old Navy, Oshman's Supersports USA, and a Jeepers family entertainment center. In addition to the anchor stores, the mall had a 12 restaurant Marketplace food court and a 16 screen Dickinson theater. All of the malls stores were arranged in a half-mile racetrack pattern and organized into four theme courts: Fashion, Home and Hobby, Sports and Adventure, and Techtainment. A corridor at the northwest portion of the wall was left as a dead end in anticipation of an expansion that would feature additional restaurants and entertainment. This expansion would have brought the malls total area to over a million square feet, but it never happened.

== Decline and closure ==
Despite a highly successful opening that attracted more than 1.5 million visitors, some analysts' assert that the Great Mall of the Great Plains saw its success waning with time, due in part to a retail saturation in the market.

The first anchor store to close at the mall was Kitchen and Co., which closed in November 1998 and was replaced with Off Fifth Saks Fifth Avenue Outlet in April 2000. To help increase foot traffic at the mall, the Olathe School District opened an alternative high school inside the mall. Dillard's Clearance Center closed in 2001 and was replaced with VF Outlet three months later. Old Navy also converted their store into an outlet store that year. Both Oshman's SuperSports USA and Old Navy closed in January 2003. Later in 2003, Cosmic Mini Golf opened in the former Oshman's SuperSports USA store, but Off Fifth Saks Fifth Avenue closed in February 2004. Linens 'N Things closed at the end of 2004 when their lease ended. In June 2005, Steve & Barry's opened in the former Oshman's Supersports USA store and Cosmic Mini Golf relocated to the former Off Fifth Saks Fifth Avenue Store. In February 2006, Jeepers was renovated into Zonkers amusement center. Later that year, Hibbett Sports opened in the former Old Navy store and Marshalls relocated to a nearby strip center on the north side of Olathe. In 2007, DSW shuttered their store once their lease expired. Famous Labels opened in the former Off Fifth Saks Fifth Avenue store and Cosmic Mini Golf relocated to the former Linens 'N Things store. In 2008, the Foozles Bookstore closed and was replaced with Book Warehouse. Also in 2008, Monkey Bizness opened in the former Linens 'N Things store and Cosmic Mini Golf relocated for the last time to the former DSW store. In late 2008, Steve & Barry's filed for bankruptcy and closed in early 2009. VF Outlet also closed by the end of that year.

The Great Recession hit the mall hard, as many retailers chose to close their less profitable Great Mall locations, or went under altogether. In an early 2008 Securities and Exchange Commission filing, Glimcher Realty Trust expressed a desire to sell the Great Mall of the Great Plains.

In September 2010, Olathe approved a 1.5-cent sales tax increase at all of the mall's stores to help improve the conditions of the mall. At that time, the mall was at 63% occupancy. That year, Treasure Hunt opened in the former VF Outlet store. Famous Labels closed in early 2011 and Driver License Bureau opened in the center of the mall in June of that year to help bring more customers into the mall. Group USA closed and moved to Oak Park Mall in July 2012. In 2013, the sales tax increase was terminated. Both Hibbett Sports and Treasure Hunt closed in 2014.

On February 16, 2015, the mall announced that it would be closing in the fall of 2015. By that time, the mall's occupancy dropped to around 35%. In April 2015, the remaining tenants were given 60 days to close or relocate. Monkey Bizness closed in April 2015 followed by Book Warehouse in May 2015. The Marketplace Food Court was emptied and shut down on June 7, 2015. Cosmic Mini Golf closed on June 13, 2015. By July 2015, only five stores were still open: Burlington Coat Factory, Dickenson Theatres, which was recently renamed B & B Theatres, Sportibles, Zonkers Family Entertainment Center, and the Kansas Driver License Bureau. Sportibles closed by the end of that month and relocated to the Olathe Landing Shopping Center. Zonkers Family Entertainment Center closed on August 2, 2015. B & B Theatres closed on August 17, 2015. On September 1, 2015, the mall's website was taken down. The Driver License Office moved out on December 16, 2015, leaving Burlington Coat Factory as the only store remaining.

== Demolition and redevelopment ==
Demolition of the mall was announced in April 2016 and began on July 11, 2016. By January 2017, the mall was completely demolished except for the Burlington Coat Factory store.

In January 2018, developers announced redevelopment plans that called for a small town center that would include a 4,000- to 5,000-seat arena, an ice rink, interactive golf, and rock climbing in addition to stores, restaurants, hotels, and office space. This project never came to fruition and the lot was sold to Garmin in October 2021.

In January 2023, Burlington Coat Factory closed, which left the entire site site completely vacant with the exception of the hotels and restaurants on the outskirts of the property.
