= Arrowhead Mountain (Washington) =

Mountain in Washington (state), United States

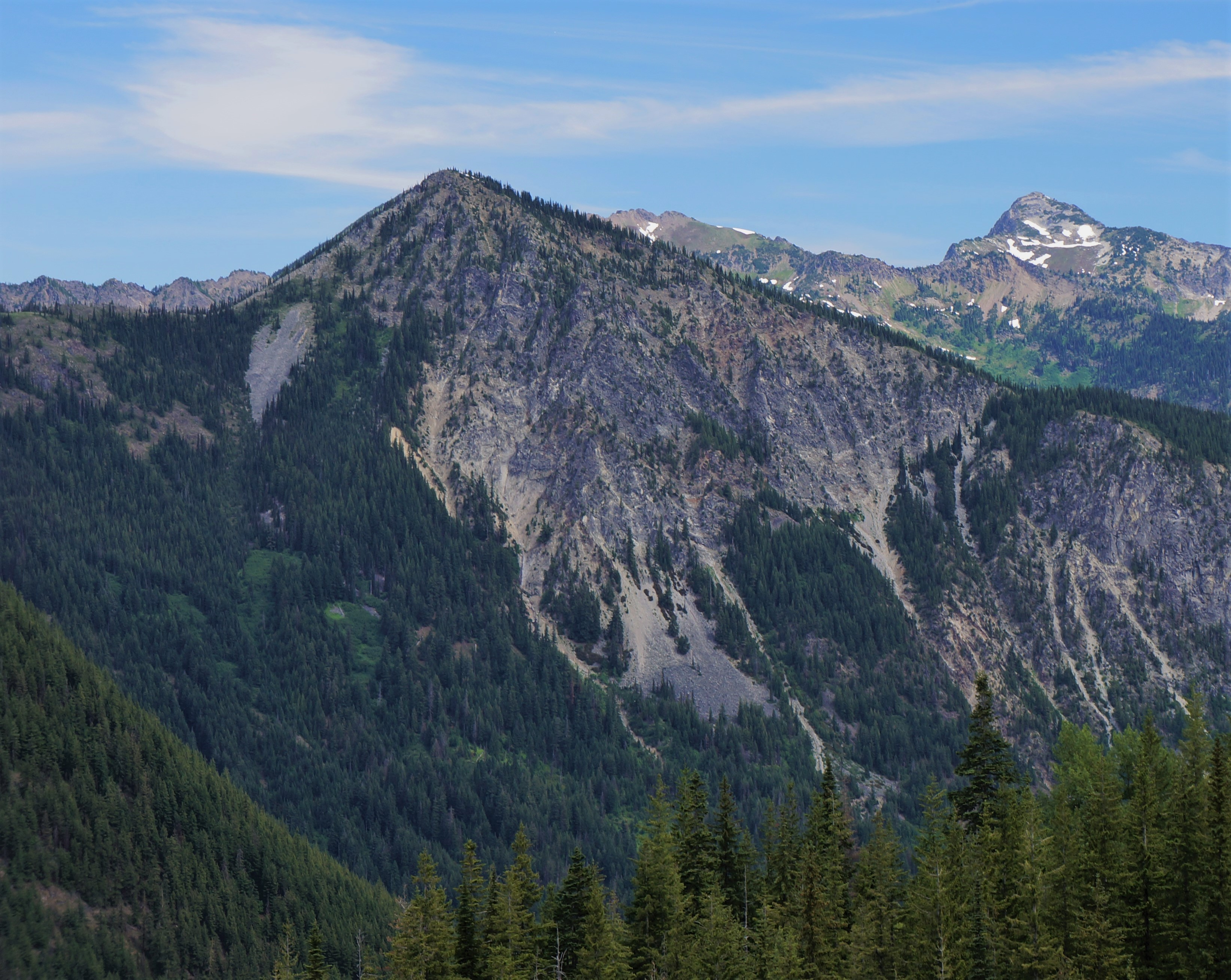
- South aspect, note arrowhead-shaped clearing to left (Mount Howard in upper right)

Highest point
- Elevation: 6,030 ft (1,840 m)
- Prominence: 550 ft (170 m)
- Parent peak: Jim Hill Mountain (6,765 ft)
- Isolation: 2.45 mi (3.94 km)
- Coordinates: 47°45′28″N 120°57′57″W

Geography
- Location within Washington (state) Location within the United States
- Country: United States
- State: Washington
- County: Chelan
- Protected area: Alpine Lakes Wilderness
- Parent range: Chiwaukum Mountains; Wenatchee Mountains; Cascade Range
- Topo map: USGS Mount Howard

Geology
- Rock age: Late Cretaceous
- Rock type: Tonalitic pluton

Arrowhead Mountain is a 6,030 ft (1,840 m) mountain summit located in Chelan County of Washington state. It is situated 6 mi (9.7 km) east of Stevens Pass, on the boundary of Alpine Lakes Wilderness, on land managed by the Okanogan–Wenatchee National Forest. Arrowhead Mountain is part of the Chiwaukum Mountains, which are a subset of the Cascade Range. Its nearest higher neighbor is Jim Hill Mountain, 2.5 mi (4.0 km) to the southwest. Precipitation runoff from the peak drains into tributaries of Nason Creek, which in turn is a tributary of the Wenatchee River. This mountain was named by Albert Hale Sylvester (1871–1944), a pioneering surveyor, explorer, topographer, and forest supervisor who named hundreds of natural features in the Cascades.

== Climate ==
Arrowhead Mountain is located in the marine west coast climate zone of western North America. Most weather fronts originating in the Pacific Ocean travel northeast toward the Cascade Mountains. As fronts approach the North Cascades, they are forced upward by the peaks of the Cascade Range (orographic lift), causing them to drop their moisture in the form of rain or snowfall onto the Cascades. As a result, the west side of the North Cascades experiences high precipitation, especially during the winter months in the form of snowfall. Because of maritime influence, snow tends to be wet and heavy, resulting in high avalanche danger. During winter months, weather is usually cloudy, but due to high pressure systems over the Pacific Ocean that intensify during summer months, there is often little or no cloud cover during the summer.

== Geology ==
The Alpine Lakes Wilderness features some of the most rugged topography in the Cascade Range with craggy peaks and ridges, deep glacial valleys, and granite walls spotted with over 700 mountain lakes. Geological events occurring many years ago created the diverse topography and drastic elevation changes over the Cascade Range leading to the various climate differences. Glacier Peak, a stratovolcano that is 25 mi (40 km) north-northwest of Arrowhead, began forming in the mid-Pleistocene.

During the Pleistocene period dating back over two million years ago, glaciation advancing and retreating repeatedly scoured the landscape leaving deposits of rock debris. The last glacial retreat in the Alpine Lakes area began about 14,000 years ago and was north of the Canada–US border by 10,000 years ago. The U-shaped cross section of the river valleys is a result of that recent glaciation. Uplift and faulting in combination with glaciation have been the dominant processes which have created the tall peaks and deep valleys of the Alpine Lakes Wilderness area.

== See also ==
- List of peaks of the Alpine Lakes Wilderness
