= Camp Arrowhead =

Camp Arrowhead can refer to:

- Camp Arrowhead (Alabama), a campground located on the Coosa River
- Camp Arrowhead (Tuxedo, North Carolina), listed on the NRHP in North Carolina
- Camp Arrowhead (Missouri), a Boy and Cub Scout camp in Marshfield, Missouri operated by the Ozark Trails Council.
- Camp Arrowhead (Tennessee)
