= Hedberg Public Library =

Library in Janesville, Wisconsin, United States

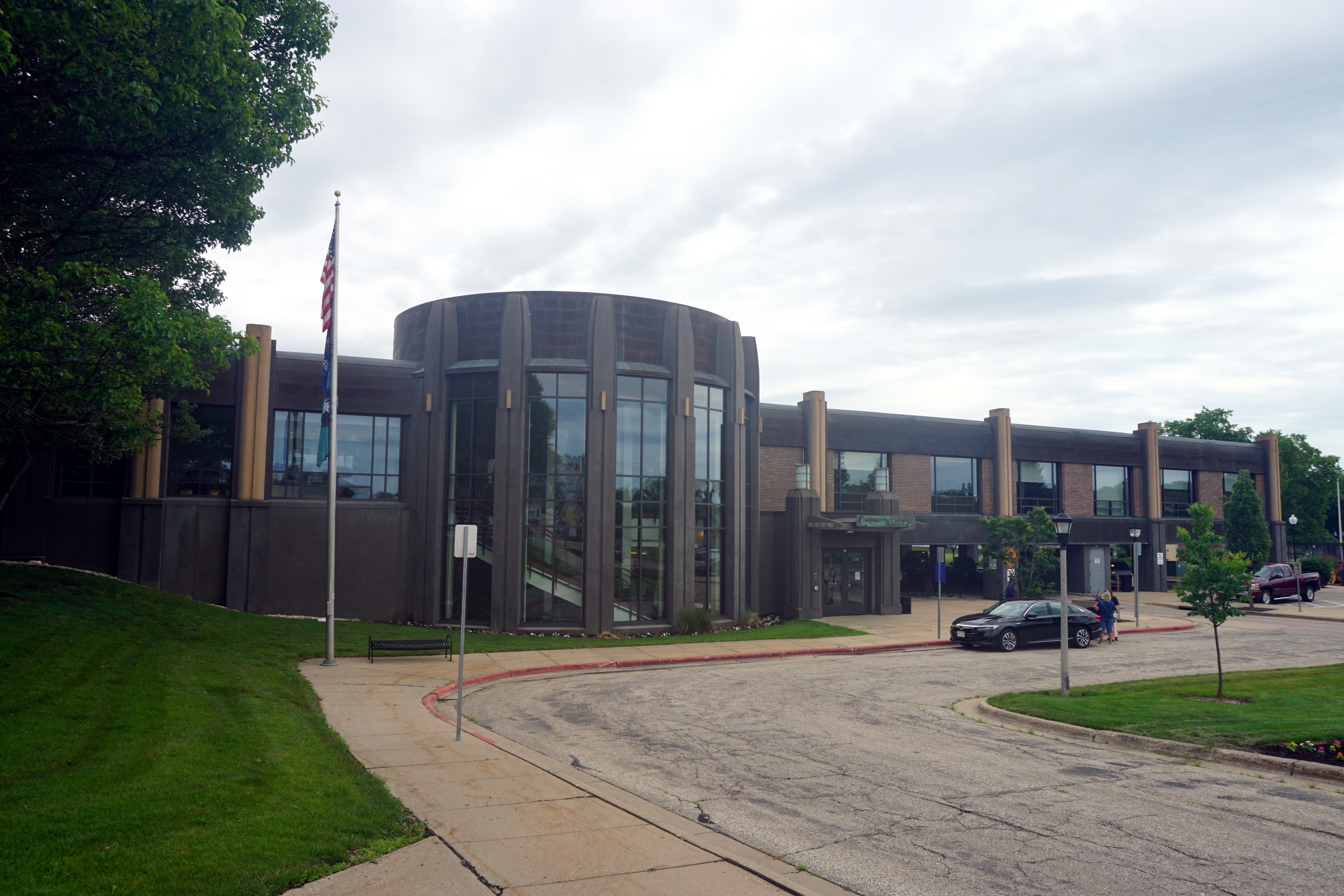
- 42.6793°N 89.0186°W
- Location: 316 South Main Street; Janesville, Wisconsin, United States
- Type: Public

Other information
- Website: www.hedbergpubliclibrary.org

The Hedberg Public Library is a public library located in Janesville, Wisconsin. The library is a member of the Prairie Lakes Library System.

== History ==
The library's origins date back to 1865, when it was a privately supported reading room for The Young Men's Association. It became the Janesville Public Library after a referendum passed in 1884 and was housed in a building known as "Bennett's Block." The library rented the space, which was near the present intersection of West Milwaukee and River streets. A building next door to "Bennett's Block" was leased three years later.

The library's first permanent home was built in 1902 at 64 S. Main. Key financial support came from the Andrew Carnegie foundation and the estate of F. S. Eldred of Janesville. General contractor J. P. Cullen and Brother of Janesville was paid $35,000 to construct the library, which opened in 1903. This building was remodeled in 1927 and again in 1932.

When the library outgrew its quarters in the early 1960s, a new library was built at 316 S. Main Street, where the library moved in April 1968. The new building's cost was $939,000. Funding included a $142,000 federal grant and a $780,000 city bond issue. Frelich-Angus Associates and Severson-Schlintz, both of Janesville, were selected as architect and general contractor, respectively.

The new 41,000-square-foot (3,800 m^{2}) building reached its intended capacity by 1979, but further expansion would wait until 1993, when a $3 million gift from Don and Gerry Hedberg put the topic back on the table. The expansion would eventually cost $8 million, including furnishings and automation. The Hedbergs, former owners of Lab Safety Supply in Janesville, increased their donation to $4.66 million. Other funders were city taxpayers ($1.49 million), the library's capital campaign ($1.1 million), the Grainger and Janesville Foundations ($625,000) and the Friends of Janesville Public Library ($25,000).

In May 1994, library operations moved to temporary quarters in a former K-mart store (now the Rock County Job Center) on the city's south side when expansion began. To save money, the original elevator shaft, the lower level and some structural elements remained intact, but the look was all new. The library reopened on Main Street in June 1996. With the expansion, the Janesville Public Library was renamed Hedberg Public Library in honor of primary donors Don and Gerry Hedberg. The architect was Meyer, Scherer and Rockcastle of Minneapolis, MN and the General Contractor was Miron Construction, of Menasha. Bringing the present square footage to 63,000-square-feet.

Beginning in April of 2019, the Hedberg Public Library began interior renovations, including updated carpeting, changes to the overall layout, meeting spaces, and other parts of the building. The total cost of the project once completed was $2.7 million dollars, with $1 million dollars coming from the City of Janesville. OPN Architects of Madison, WI were selected as architect and general contractor. Renovations were completed in the spring of 2020.
