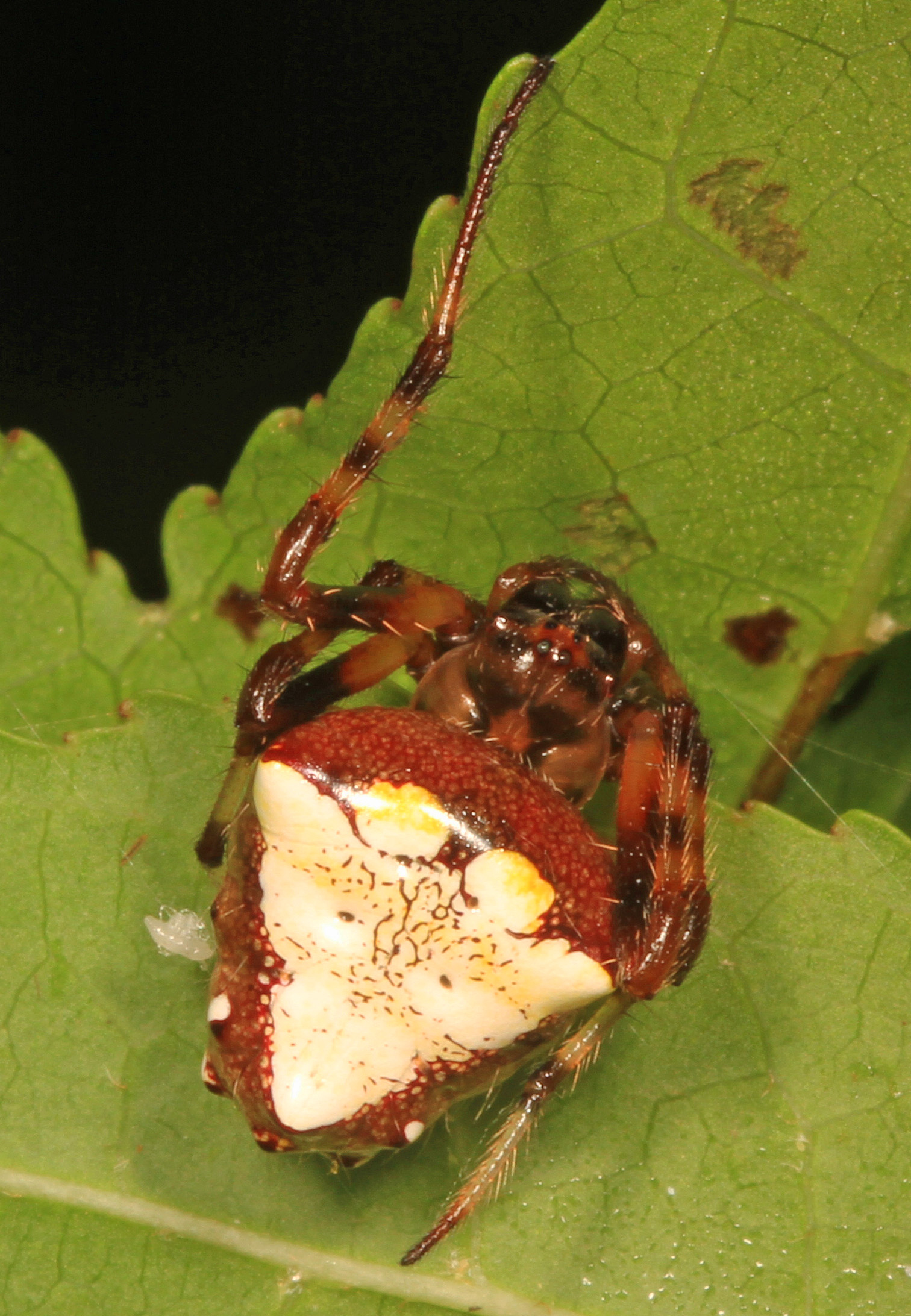
- Female V. arenata from Virginia

Scientific classification
- Kingdom: Animalia
- Phylum: Arthropoda
- Subphylum: Chelicerata
- Class: Arachnida
- Order: Araneae
- Infraorder: Araneomorphae
- Family: Araneidae
- Genus: Verrucosa
- Species: V. arenata

Binomial name
- Verrucosa arenata (Walckenaer, 1842)

Synonyms
- Epeira mexicana Lucas, 1833; Epeira arenata Walckenaer, 1841; Epeira verrucosa Hentz, 1850; Acanthepeira verrucosa Marx, 1883; Verrucosa arenata McCook, 1888; Mahadeva verrucosa Keyserling, 1892; Verrucosa arenata McCook, 1894; Araneus mexicanus Simon, 1895; Epeira verrucosa Emerton, 1902; Verrucosa arenata F. O. Pickard-Cambridge, 1904; Araneus arenatus Petrunkevitch, 1911; Araneus aequiangulus Franganillo, 1930; Araneus aequiangulus ochraceus Franganillo, 1930; Verrucosa arenata Petrunkevitch, 1930; Verrucosa arenata Levi, 1976; Verrucosa arenata Coddington, 1990; Verrucosa arenata Scharff & Coddington, 1997; Verrucosa arenata Levi, 2002; Verrucosa arenata Lise, Kesster & da Silva, 2015

= Verrucosa arenata =

Species of spider

Verrucosa arenata, also known as the triangle orb weaver, arrowhead spider, and arrowhead orbweaver, is a species of orb-weaver spider found across North America. It is one of the few known large orb-weaver spiders that sits facing upwards in its web. Unlike most orb-weavers, which have bulbous abdomens, V. arenata has an abdomen that is pointy and triangular, shaped like the tip of an arrow. In females, the abdomen is colored white or yellow. Additionally, V. arenata uses reeling behavior in order to capture its prey, as its webs are stronger than that of most other orb weavers. The genus name Verrucosa means "warty" in Latin, referring to the small wartlike bumps on the spider's abdomen, while the specific epithet arenata derives from Latin arena, meaning "sand".

== Distribution and habitat ==
Verrucosa arenata are found across a variety of urban and rural habitats in North America, in areas with trees and bushes to spin their webs. These may include plantations, urban parks, gardens, yards, or woods. They are typically found in late summer and early fall, living in the understory, along open, humid areas where they may experience direct sunlight.

== Description ==
Verrucosa arenata are large spiders. Females weigh 0.05–0.46 g and their body length is 7–14 mm. This species is sexually dimorphic, as females are larger than males. Male body length ranges from 4 to 6 mm. V. arenata are polychromatic and their abdomen color ranges from white to yellow. Some smaller, vein-like markings on the abdominal area are red. Females can have black, brown, or rusty red colored legs and carapace. The head is small compared to this spider's triangular abdomen. Their abdomen is completely covered with a triangle of color, usually yellow or white. Males are smaller and lack the characteristic triangle on their abdomen. The male arrowhead spiders are rarely seen unless they are mating or courting a female spider in their web. V. arenata are diurnal. Their webs are usually non-functional by midday due to insect damage and the spider ends the night in a retreat.

=== Color polymorphism ===
V. arenata show color variation in the triangular pattern on the dorsal part of the abdomen. This part of the abdomen is usually either white or yellow. It can reflect light in the UV part of the electromagnetic spectrum. Yellow arrowhead spiders showed higher chromatic contrast while white spiders showed higher achromatic contrast. White spiders have been observed to be more abundant during the breeding season and have a better body condition than yellow spiders. However, yellow spiders are more successful at attracting prey. Additionally, a much higher amount of UV light is reflected by the white spiders than the yellow spiders. Only at a close range does the effect of the different colors become apparent to prey and predators. There is a trade-off where the less visible morph (white) is dominant, but the more visible morph (yellow) attracts more prey at the potential cost of attracting more predators.

=== Thermoregulation ===
V. arenata actively thermoregulates so that their body temperature is well below the ambient temperature. There is no difference in surface temperature for spiders with a yellow or white abdomen, suggesting that V. arenata are achieving their thermoregulatory status through behavioral or physiological means rather than through variation in pigmentation. However, white morphs have a higher overall reflectance. This means that white morphs could have an advantage in exploiting open habitats. V. arenata faces significant thermal constraints if they build their webs in exposed conditions, so the white morph has thermal advantages in these habitats since their pigmentation allows them to better withstand thermal stress. The white morphs could have a thermal advantage because they have lower absorption of short wave and visible radiation.

== Webs ==
Verrucosa arenata are orb-weaver spiders and their webs are nearly invisible to their insect prey. V. arenata webs have a distinct architecture since it consists of a central hub without radial threads. Female V. arenata are usually observed to be in the center of the web since it is a good location for catching the most prey. In the web, the females usually have their heads up and the apex of the triangular mark pointing downwards.

V. arenata is one of the few known large orb-weaver spiders that sits facing upwards in its web. Their webs are down-biased asymmetric. Some benefits to this upward orientation include V. arenata's ability to build top-biased webs that likely lead to more efficient prey capture, more prey interceptions, and faster catching of insects in the upper part of the webs. V. arenata webs are generally elliptical with an elongated hub area. The spiders are then oriented so that their cephalothorax is facing upwards.

V. arenata usually take down their webs. When they don't the webs are severely damaged by midday as a result of frequent rainfall. Additionally, their webs are made of tougher and stretchier silk strands in comparison to other orb web spiders.

=== Prey capture techniques ===
During prey capture, V. arenata run towards the prey, stopping and then pulling the prey towards themselves when running downwards. The running rates between upward running and downward running spiders do not differ, but the time it takes to capture prey depends on the weight of the spider. Heavier spiders run slower upwards and run downwards faster.

V. arenata pluck the web—meaning that the spider tugs at the radial threads of the web with their frontal legs—in order to locate the prey or induce further prey movements. Their ability to use the plucking motion is associated with the spider's location of prey and possibly for further entanglement of the prey in the web. After plucking, these spiders shake their whole body, known as 'bouncing', and then they will 'reel' the prey in by pulling on the radial thread as they approach the prey. V. arenata reel in prey from the bottom of their web towards themselves. Thus, this behavior can differ based on the weight of the prey. Spiders of this species approach heavier prey more slowly than they approach lighter prey. V. arenata are able to use this "reeling' method because its webs can withstand pulling at a much higher rate than most other spiders, as the web's silk strands are tougher and stretchier. Additionally, these arrowhead spiders usually remake their webs often, so web damage associated with reeling is not critical compared to the successful capture of prey.

== Diet ==
V. arenata typically capture insects by trapping them in the sticky strands of their webs. They deliver a bite of venom to subdue the prey and then digest the insides of the insect. They wait and then return to the insect in order to ingest its liquified contents. V. arenata specialize in eating tiny flying insects, like mosquitoes, since their webs have close spacing of circles. Their most common prey is dipterans and hymenopterans.

== Gallery ==
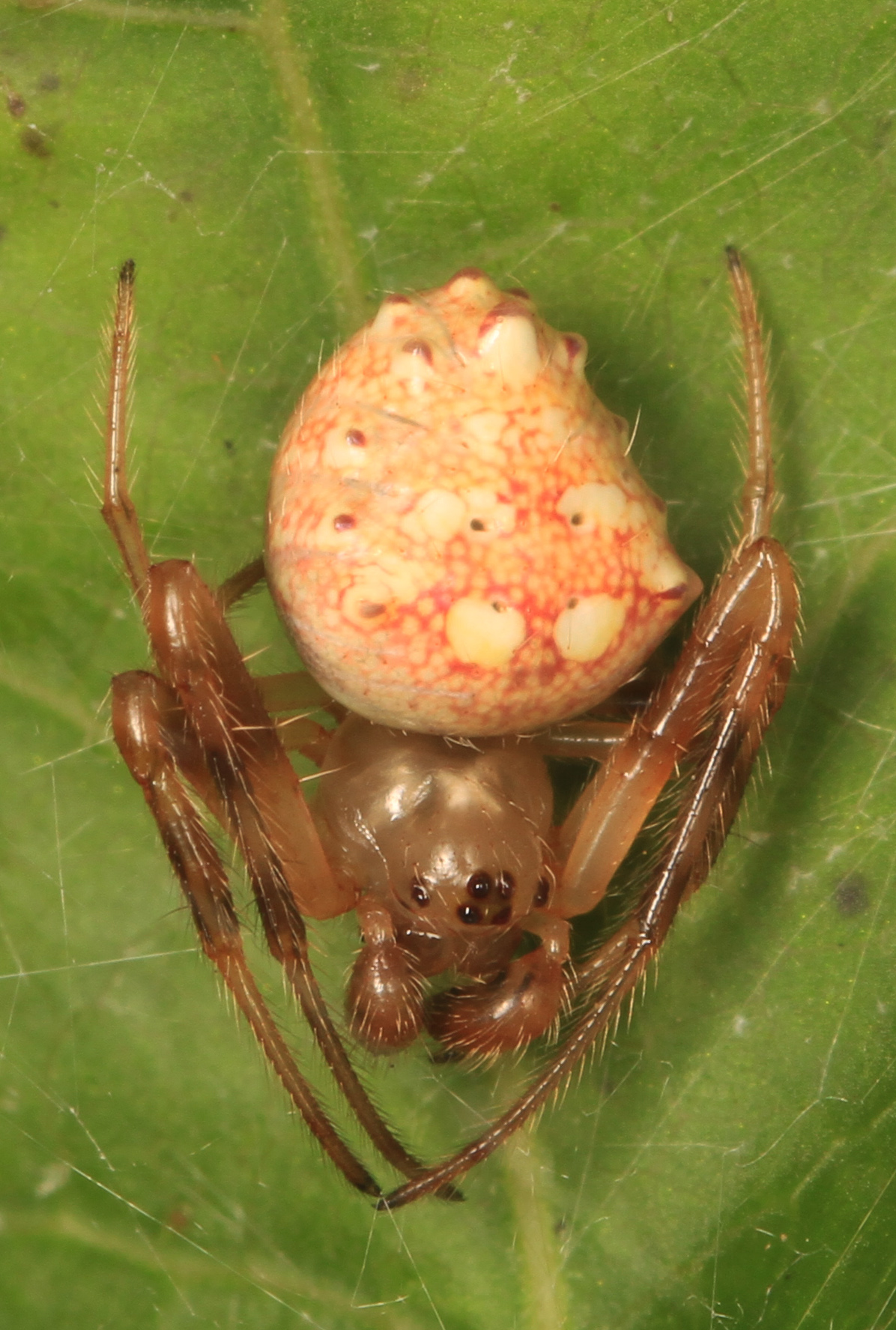
male from Virginia

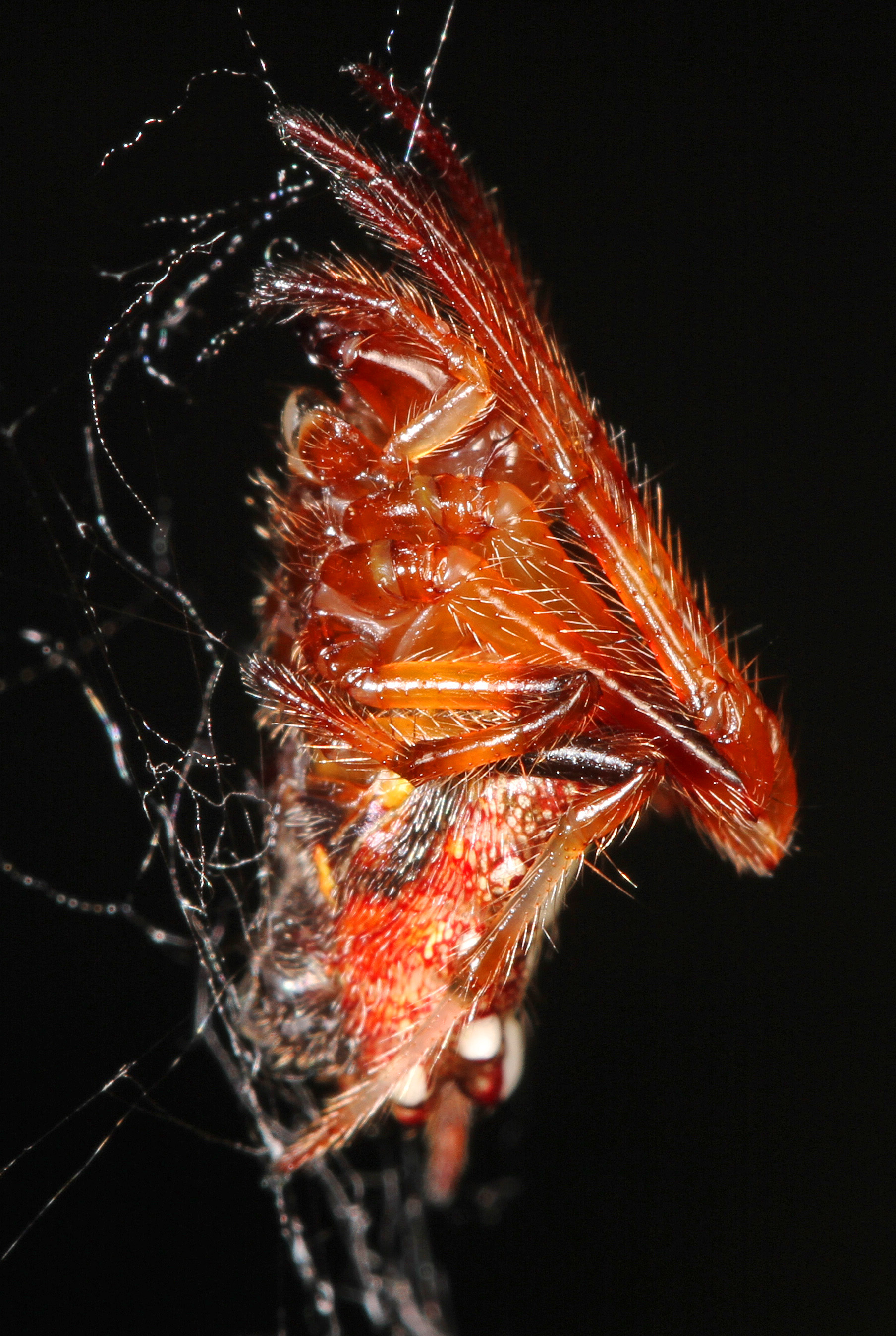
lateral (female)

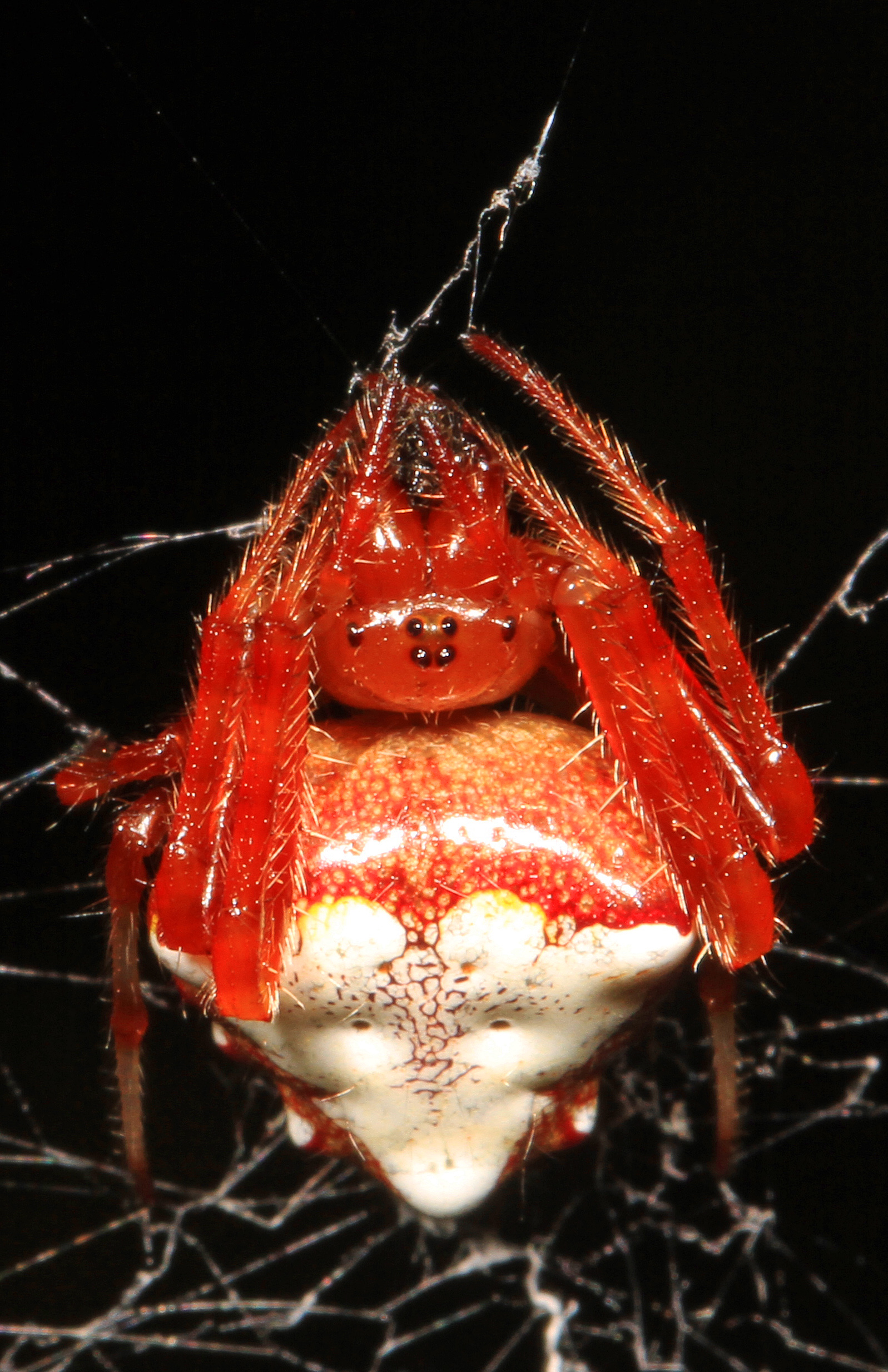
showing eyes

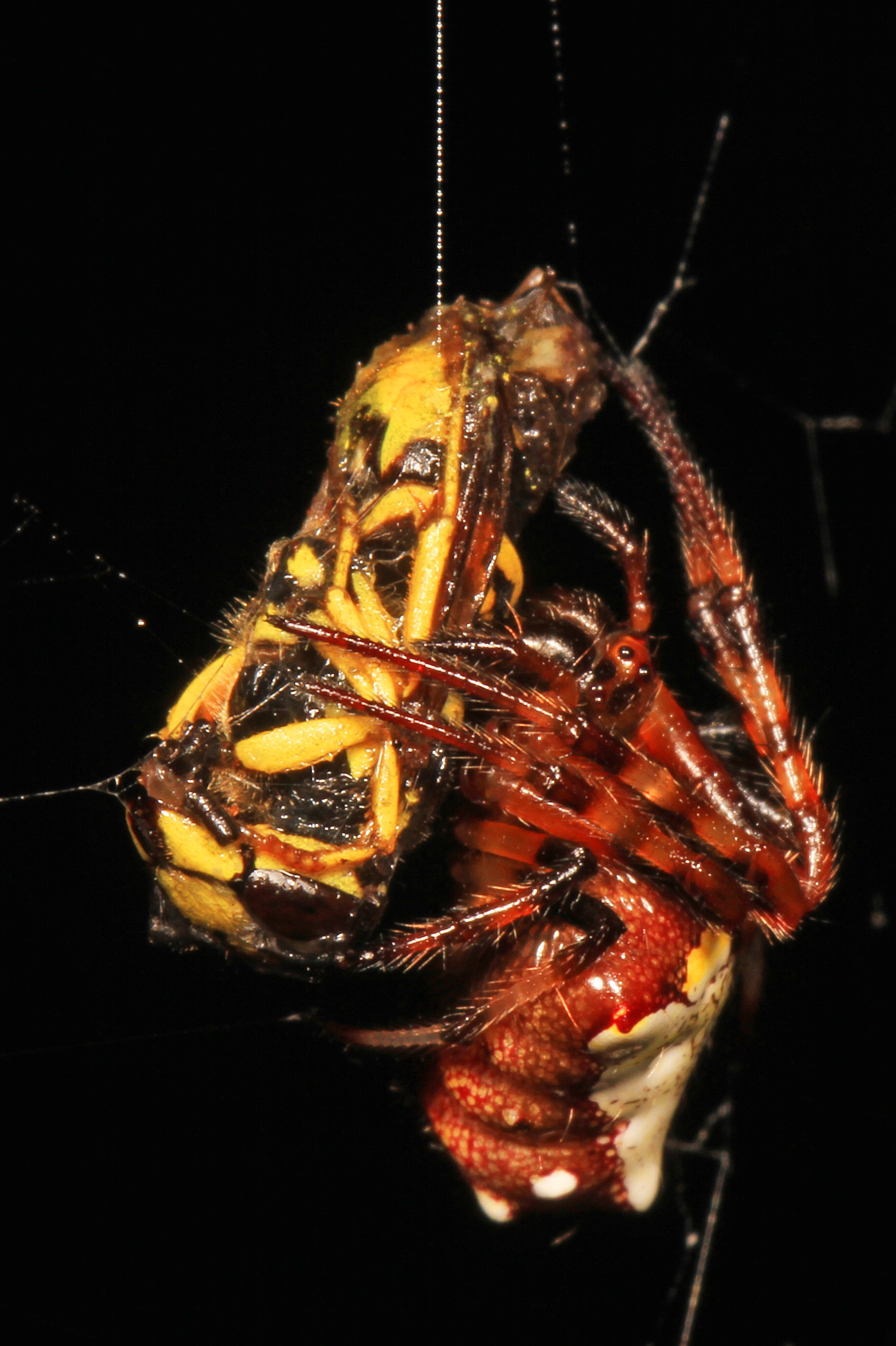
with prey

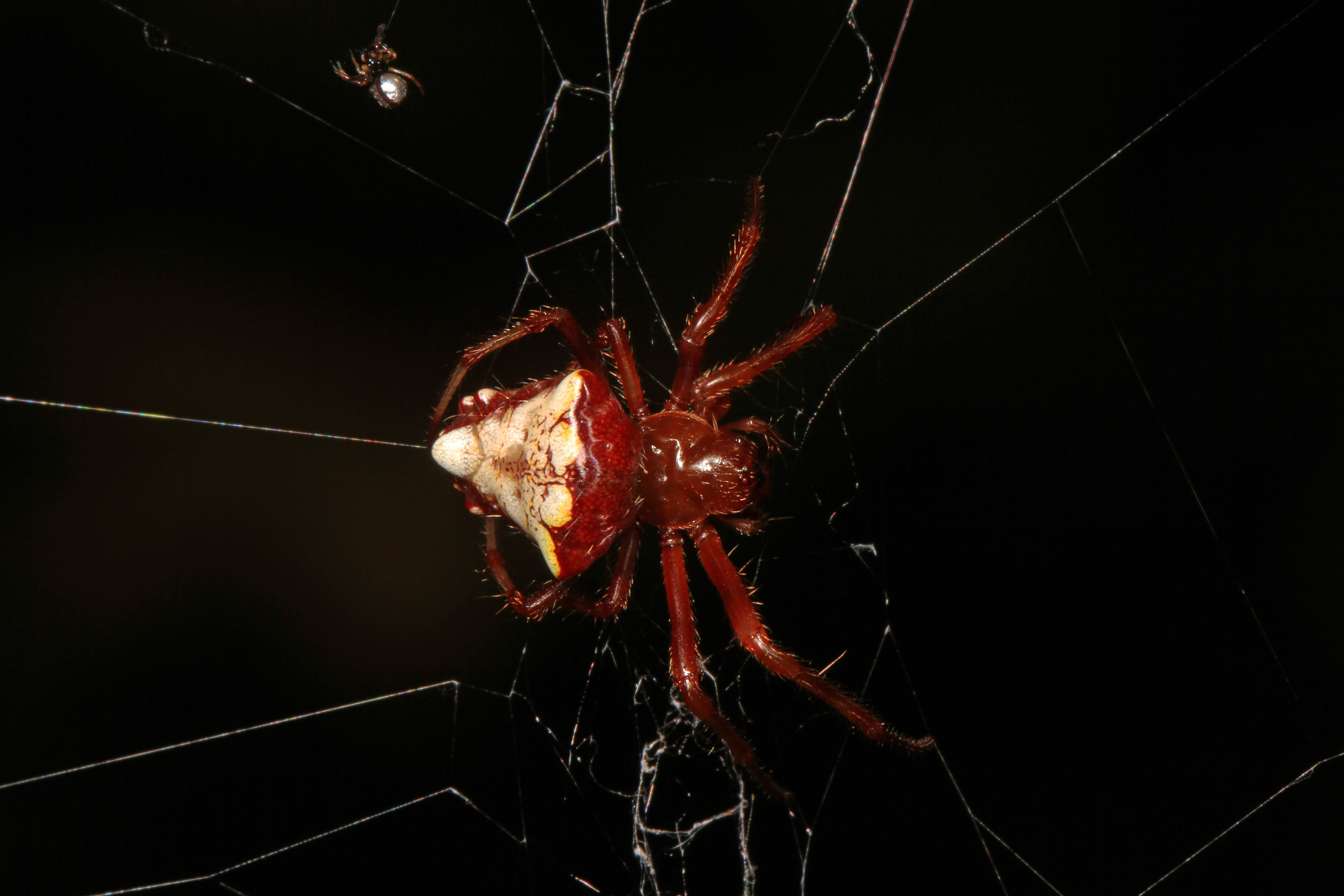
with kleptoparasitic spider

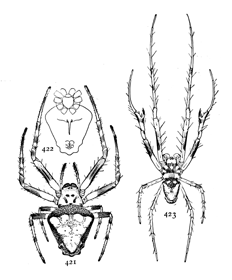
female + male (Emerton 1902)
