= Ash River =

- Mouth of the Ash River

Location
- Country: United States
- State: Minnesota
- County: St. Louis County

Physical characteristics
- Source
  - coordinates: 48.2224156°N 92.9221091°W
- Mouth
  - coordinates: 48.4171297°N 92.7890442°W
- Length: 29 mi (47 km)

The Ash River is a river of Minnesota. The land surrounding the river was part of the ancient Lake Agassiz. The Ash River is 29 mi (47 km) long. Portions of the river are a designated trout stream.

== See also ==
- List of rivers of Minnesota
