= Arrowhead State Trail =

Coordinates: 48°6′6″N 92°40′35″W

- Length: 135 mi (217 km)
- Location: Arrowhead Region, Minnesota, USA
- Designation: Minnesota state trail
- Trailheads: Tower; International Falls
- Use: Hiking, horseback riding, mountain biking, snowmobiling
- Season: Primarily winter
- Sights: Sturgeon River State Forest, Kabetogama State Forest, Ash River
- Hazards: Logging traffic, severe weather, standing water in summer
- Surface: Dirt
- Website: Arrowhead State Trail

The Arrowhead State Trail is a recreational trail in the Arrowhead Region of northern Minnesota, USA, geared primarily for winter snowmobile use. It runs 135 miles (217 km) from an intersection with the Taconite State Trail 10 miles (16 km) west of Tower to an intersection with the Blue Ox Trail 3 miles (4.8 km) south of International Falls. In summer about 69 miles (111 km) are suitable for hiking, horseback riding, and mountain biking, while the northern section is blocked by areas of wetness and standing water.

The Arrowhead State Trail was authorized by the Minnesota Legislature in 1974–75. It is managed by the Minnesota Department of Natural Resources.

== Description ==
The northern section of the trail from International Falls to the Ash River is fairly flat, passing through forests of aspen on higher ground and spruce and ash on lower ground. The southern section is more rugged, featuring rolling hills with large, exposed boulders interspersed with many lakes and streams. This thickly wooded area is part of the Laurentian Mixed Forest Province. There are intersections with numerous local snowmobile trails. The route of the Arrowhead State Trail passes within one mile (1.6 km) of Voyageurs National Park and within 10 miles (16 km) of the Boundary Waters Canoe Area Wilderness. The trail, which very roughly follows U.S. Route 53, offers nine shelters with firepits and restrooms.

== Events ==
Since 2005 the trail has hosted the Arrowhead 135, a 135-mile (217 km) extreme endurance race in which contestants are challenged to carry all of their own gear under their own power via foot, ski, or bicycle, in mid-winter.
