= Arrowhead (Charlottesville, Virginia) =

Historic house in Virginia, United States

- U.S. National Register of Historic Places
- Virginia Landmarks Register
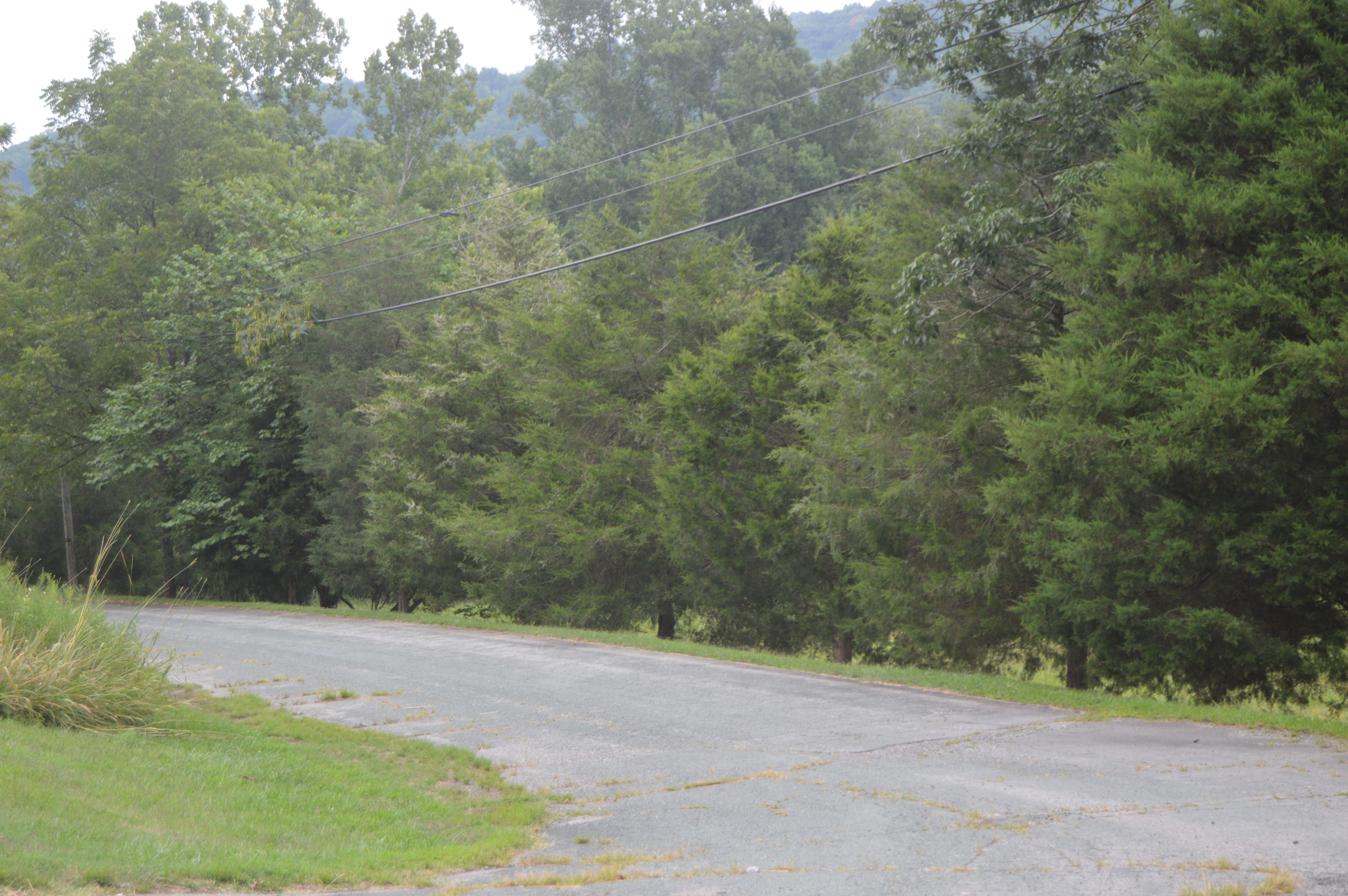
- Entrance to the property

- Location within Virginia Location within the United States
- Location: Eastern side of U.S. Route 29, 1.5 miles (2.4 km) northeast of the junction with VA 608, near Charlottesville, Virginia
- Coordinates: 37°58′48″N 78°35′43″W
- Area: 21.1 acres (8.5 ha)
- Built: 1859-1860
- Architectural style: Colonial Revival, Greek Revival, Vernacular Greek Revival
- NRHP reference No.: 91000885
- VLR No.: 002-0195

Significant dates
- Added to NRHP: July 9, 1991
- Designated VLR: April 17, 1991

Arrowhead, also known as Arrowhead at Red Hill, is a historic home and farm complex located near Charlottesville, Albemarle County, Virginia. It consists of a two-story, three-bay, gable-roofed frame center section dated to the 1850s; a two-story, multi-bay north extension added in the early 1900s; and a two-bay, two-story library wing added about 1907–1908. The interior features Greek Revival style details. Also on the property are a one-story frame kitchen building, a brick smokehouse, a large icehouse (now a garage), and a 1 1/2-story board-and-batten cottage.

It was added to the National Register of Historic Places in 1991.
