= Arrowhead Library System (Wisconsin) =

Public libraries in Wisconsin, United States

- 42.77349°N 88.94402°W
- Established: 1974
- Branches: 7

Collection
- Size: 489,816 (2015)

Access and use
- Circulation: 613,850 (2015)
- Population served: 120,073 (2015)
- Members: 102,892 (2015)

Other information
- Director: Steve Platteter
- Website: als.lib.wi.us

The Arrowhead Library System (ALS) was a library system consisting of seven public libraries and several academic/school library affiliate members, all serving Rock County, Wisconsin. The headquarters of the library system was located on the lower level of the Milton Public Library in Milton, Wisconsin. In 2023, Arrowhead Library System merged with the Lakeshores Library System to form the Prairie Lakes Library System.

== History ==
The library system was founded in 1974 to coordinate services among the libraries in Rock County. This collaboration allowed for the expansion of library services to the residents of the county, including interlibrary loan, a book delivery system, and public relations activities.

In 2017 the Arrowhead Library System joined the SHARE consortium, which linked Arrowhead to other library systems in southern Wisconsin. This allowed for the replacement of the cataloging software used by the ALS, increasing the number of books in the catalog from 750,000 to over 2.15 million; provided for user access to a greater number of library items; and provided a greater range of digital features for library patrons.

== Public Libraries ==
- Beloit Public Library
- Clinton Public Library
- Eager Free Public Library, Evansville
- Edgerton Public Library
- Hedberg Public Library, Janesville (Two Branches: Main Branch and Express Branch)
- Milton Public Library
- Orfordville Public Library
