= Beloit Public Library =

Public library in Wisconsin, United States

- 42.5195°N 89.0313°W
- Location: 605 Eclipse Boulevard; Beloit, Wisconsin, United States
- Type: Public
- Branch of: The Arrowhead Library System

Access and use
- Population served: 48,000

Other information
- Director: Nick Dimassis
- Public transit access: Beloit Transit
- Website: www.beloitlibrary.org

The Beloit Public Library is a public library located in Beloit, Wisconsin. The library is a member of the Arrowhead Library System, a consortium of seven libraries serving Rock County, Wisconsin.

== History ==
The Beloit Public Library has been operating for 125 years. Beginning in the late 1850s, local volunteer fire companies began to offer library services. It wasn't until 1859 that the first library in Beloit was established.

At the turn of the 20th century, industrialist Andrew Carnegie began donating millions of dollars for the construction of public libraries in the United States. In 1901, J.B. Dow, the president of the Beloit public library board petitioned Carnegie for funds to construct a new library building. In return, the Beloit library board was granted $25,000 to construct the building on the condition that the city appropriate $2,500 each year for its maintenance.

By 1961, the Carnegie library building was deemed to be outmoded and a $400,000 plan was drafted for a new space. In 1966, the new library received an additional $206,000 in federal funds in order to further increase the size of the building.

In 1969, the Beloit Public Library won the Wisconsin Library of the Year Award by the Wisconsin Library Association. This award was given in conjunction to both the Beloit and Janesville public libraries.

A third move took place in 1972 when the Beloit and East Side libraries merged and moved to downtown Beloit following a $900,000 renovation of what was the former post office. A fourth move took it, in April 2009, from Pleasant St. to Eclipse Blvd in Beloit
