= Arrowhead Nunatak =

Nunatak in Oates Land, Antarctica

Arrowhead Nunatak (82°34′S 157°22′E) is a long, narrow nunatak 7 nautical miles (13 km) southeast of Sullivan Nunatak near the head of Nimrod Glacier. It was mapped and so named by the northern party of the New Zealand Geological Survey Antarctic Expedition (1960–61) because in plan it resembles an arrowhead.
