= Arrowhead Lake (Ontario) =

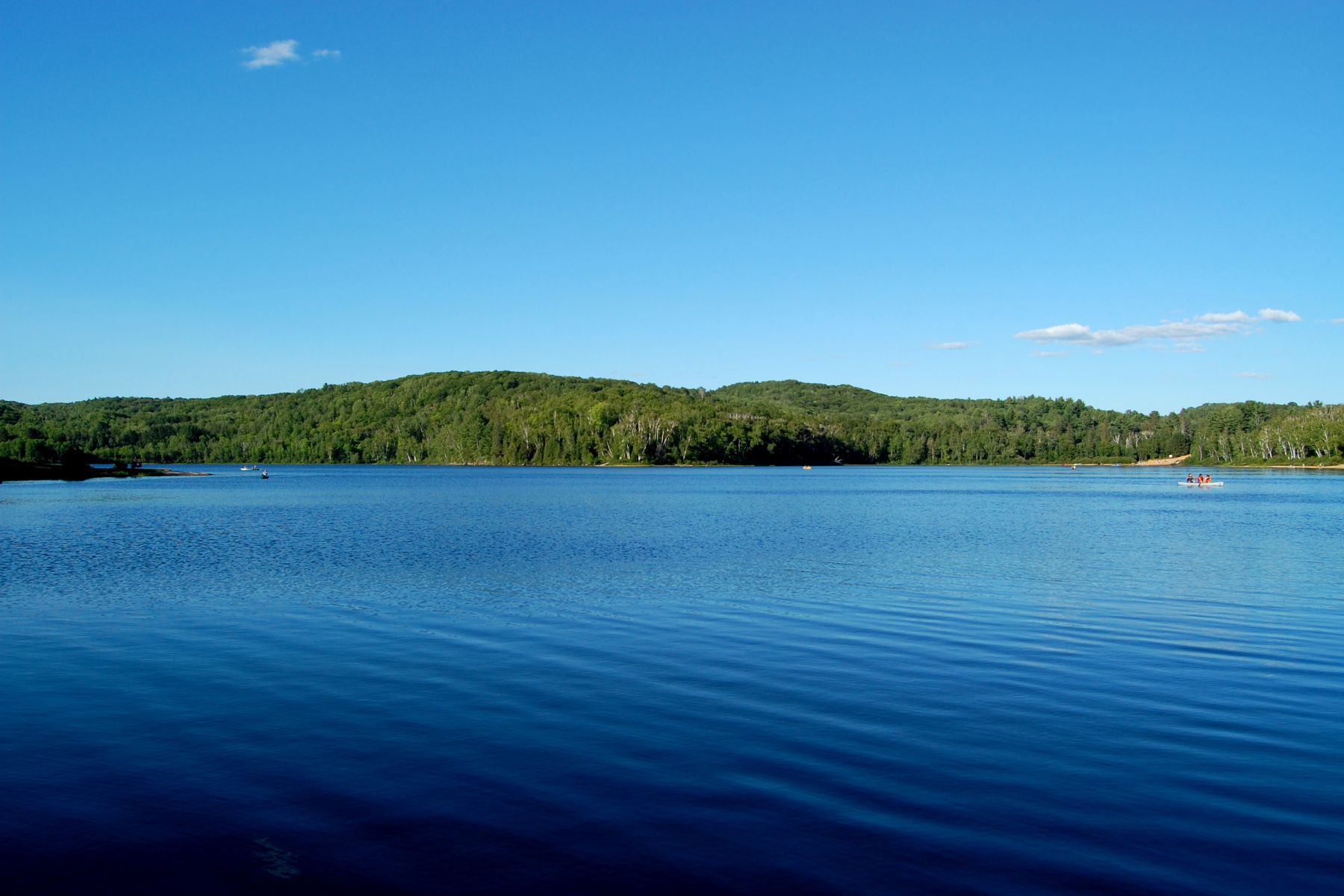
Shot in Arrowhead Provincial Park. 5, August 2007, 18:17 Source: Arrowhead Lake John Vetterli from Toronto, Canada

Arrowhead Lake is the name of several lakes in Ontario, Canada.

The lakes are located in the following districts (west to east):

- Kenora District 50°43′52″N 92°55′29″W
- Thunder Bay District 49°19′33″N 88°40′28″W
- Algoma District 46°30′30″N 82°25′40″W
- Muskoka District 45°23′48″N 79°12′03″W

== See also ==
- List of lakes in Ontario
