= Mount Verstovia =

Mountain in Alaska, United States

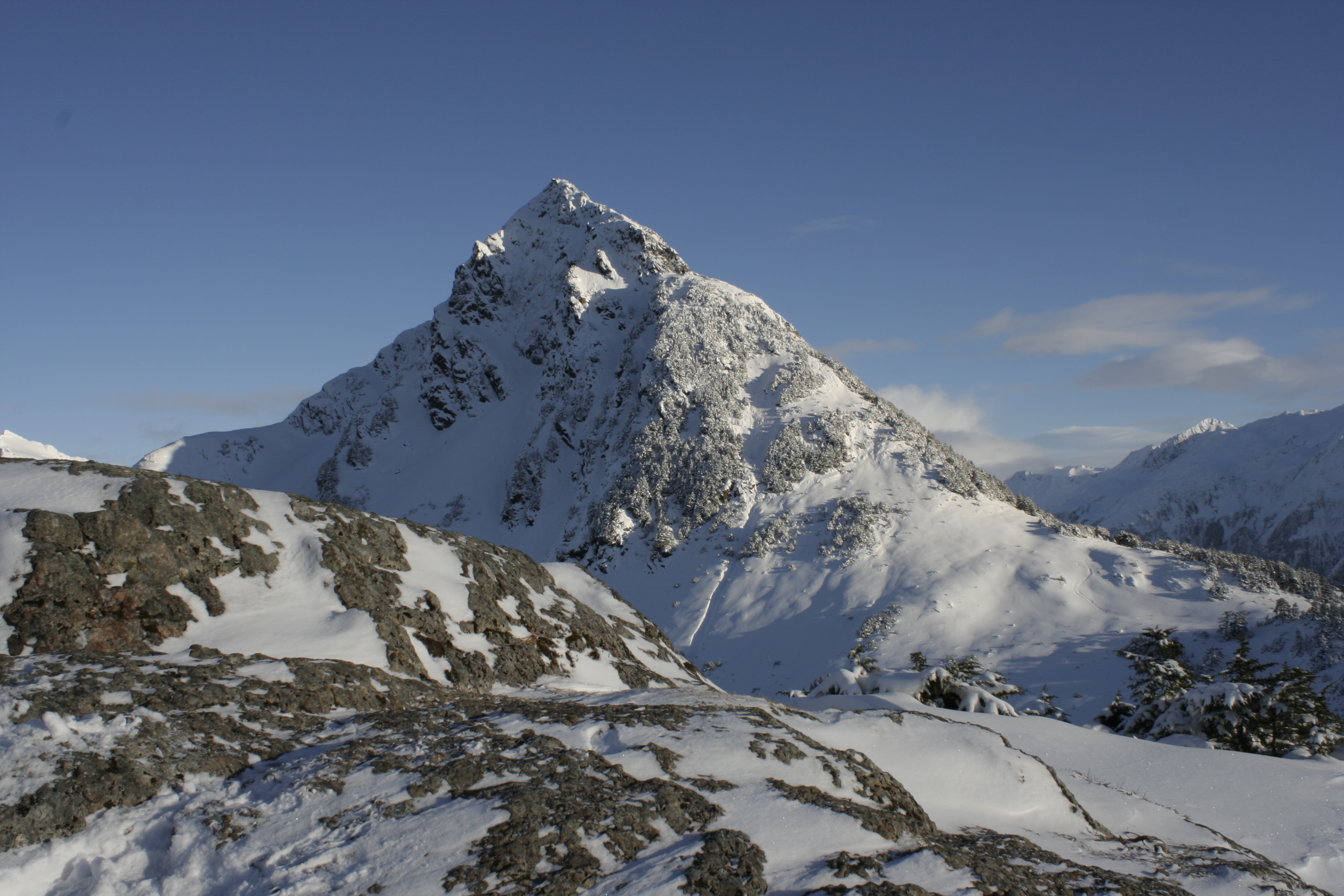
- Mt. Verstovia as viewed from "Picnic Rock" (USGS 2,550')

Highest point
- Elevation: 3,313 ft (1,010 m)
- Prominence: 1,050 ft (320 m)
- Parent peak: The Sisters (3,838 ft)
- Isolation: 3.13 mi (5.04 km)
- Coordinates: 57°03′33″N 135°15′57″W

Geography
- Location within Alaska
- Location: Sitka city-borough
- Country: United States
- State: Alaska
- Protected area: Tongass National Forest
- Topo map: USGS Sitka A-4

Climbing
- Easiest route: Mt Verstovia Trail

Mount Verstovia is a prominent peak located just 2.6 miles east of the center of Sitka, Alaska, on Baranof Island, Alexander Archipelago. The 3,313-foot (1,010 m) summit rises steeply from the nearby Pacific Ocean, with its lower flanks cloaked in temperate old growth rain forests and its upper regions, above 2,400 feet, being above treeline and providing excellent vistas of Sitka and the surrounding mountain and ocean environments.

This peak was first named "Gora Verstovaya" in 1809 by the navigator Ivan Vasiliev. Gora translates to "mount" in Russian and verst refers to a unit of measurement equaling 0.6629 miles (or 3,500 feet), which closely resembles the actual height of Mt. Verstovia.

The main summit of Mount Verstovia is called Arrow Head by the people of Sitka, Alaska, because of its resemblance of an arrow head pointed up behind the sub peak.

A significant sub peak of Mount Verstovia lies just 0.5 miles to the west of the main summit. This 2,550 foot "hump" was reported in 1869 by G Davidson, USC&GS, to be named Cross Mountain. It is said to have acquired that name as the Russians erected a cross there. After that cross was erected, the Tlingit gave it their own name of Kanéisti Shaa (Cross Mountain). This sub peak is now locally referred to as "Picnic Rock", although it bears no name on USGS maps. In hopes of avoiding confusion, modern USGS maps now name an entirely different peak approximately eight miles to the southeast as "Cross Mountain".

== Access and recreation ==
Mount Verstovia is accessible by a well-maintained public trail that, departs from Jamestown Bay and after 1.8 miles of switchbacks, arrives at the top of "Picnic Rock" (USGS 2,550'). One may continue on to Mount Verstovia's summit by following the unmaintained trail approximately 0.8 miles to the east. This unmaintained trail includes some steep scrambles and requires basic alpine skills and judgement.

Snowboarding, skiing, and other winter sports are very popular in the bowl nestled between "Picnic Rock" and Mount Verstovia. The trail is marked with reflective signs on tree trunks to help snow aficionados find their way up in snowy conditions.
