= Arrowhead Mall =

Shopping mall in Muskogee, Oklahoma

Coordinates: 35.7514°N 95.3675°W

- Location: Muskogee, Oklahoma
- Opened: 1987
- Closed: September 2021
- Developer: Warmack & Co.
- Manager: J. Herzog
- Num. of stores: 7
- Num. of anchor tenants: 4 (all became vacant around October 2020)
- Floor area: 432,865 sq ft (40,214.5 m^{2})
- Floors: 1
- Website: arrowheadmallok.com

Arrowhead Mall is an enclosed shopping mall in Muskogee, Oklahoma. It was opened in 1987 and was owned by J. Herzog & Sons, Inc. from 2005 until November 2016 when the mall went into receivership and was put up for sale by Wells Fargo Bank. Wells Fargo bank sold the mall to an investor in 2018 and is currently managed by Property Managers LLC of Fort Worth, Texas. It is the only mall located within 44 miles of Muskogee, but remains close to the neighboring Tulsa metropolitan area.

== History ==
Arrowhead Mall was built in 1987 in the downtown district of Muskogee.

In 2005, J. Herzog bought the mall from its original owner, Warmack & Company.

On April 10, 2010, a deadly shooting broke out at the Arrowhead Mall injuring at least five people and leaving one dead; witnesses say that the shooting was gang related.

J. Herzog updated the mall throughout 2014, removing the old play area and adding more seating in the food court, free Wi-Fi, and a Justice clothing store. Sears announced the closure of its Muskogee store in August 2014. Sears closed in November 2014. The United States Postal Service moved into part of the old Sears store location in 2019.

Dillard's closed May 2019 and Stage closed August 2020. On June 4, 2020, it was announced that JCPenney would close around October 2020 as part of a plan to close 154 stores nationwide. The JCPenney closure left the mall without any anchors.

In September 2021, Arrowhead Mall closed off and has a federal contract to lease or rent office space.

In September 2021, Arrowhead Mall secured a federal contract worth $996,640 to lease office space, marking a further shift away from its traditional role as a regional shopping mall. The transition toward mixed-use occupancy was gradual, rather than a complete closure of the complex. In September 2026, the United States Probation Office announced plans to relocate to the mall's first floor, continuing the property's conversion to non-retail uses.
