= Arrowhead Library System (Minnesota) =

Public library system in Minnesota, United States

Coordinates: 47°31′3″N 92°35′34″W

The Arrowhead Library System (ALS) is the regional public library system that serves the seven counties in northeastern Minnesota, United States, It is geographically the largest public library system in the state. The seven counties served are Carlton, Cook, Itasca, Koochiching, Lake, Lake of the Woods, and St. Louis, for a total population of 308,012 (as of 2008) people served. There are 29 member libraries in the system with a total of 2,392,726 items circulated in 2008.

As of July 1, 2012, the Arrowhead Library System is the regional multi-type library system as well the regional public library system. Therefore, ALS will be serving their constituents by "promoting and facilitating cooperation among the academic, public, school library media centers, and special libraries" as well as continuing to provide the member public libraries with support to "provide free access to library services for all residents of the region without discrimination."

== Mission ==
"The mission of the Arrowhead Library System is to deliver highly responsive and accessible library service to its member libraries and people of the region through a collaborative network of coordinated programs."

== Legacy funding ==
Libraries in Minnesota receive a portion of funding from the Minnesota Legacy Amendment under the Arts and Cultural Heritage funding allocation. In 2011, the Arrowhead Library System received $457,762.74 in legacy funding, and was able to provide 134 programs to 22,496 residents in northeastern Minnesota.

== Member libraries ==
=== Public libraries ===
- Aurora Public Library
- Babbitt Public Library
- Baudette Public Library
- Bovey Public Library
- Buhl Public Library
- Calumet Public Library
- Carlton Public Library
- Chisholm Public Library
- Cloquet Public Library
- Coleraine Public Library
- Cook Public Library
- Duluth Public Library
- Ely Public Library
- Eveleth Public Library
- Gilbert Public Library
- Grand Marais Public Library
- Grand Rapids Area Library
- Hibbing public Library
- Hoyt Lakes Public Library
- International Falls Public Library
- Keewatin Public Library
- Kinney Public Library
- Marble Public Library
- McKinley Public Library
- Moose Lake Public Library
- Mt. Iron Public Library
- Silver Bay Public Library
- Two Harbors Public Library
- Virginia Public Library
