= Florence Lake (disambiguation) =

Florence Lake (1904–1980) was an American film actress.

Florence Lake may also refer to:

- Florence Lake Dam in California
- Upper Florence Lake and Lower Florence Lake in the Alpine Lakes Wilderness
- Florence Lake School No. 3 in North Dakota
- Lake Florence (Brevard County, Florida)
- Lake Florence (Florida)
