= Lake Ida =

Lake Ida or Ida Lake may refer to:

- Lake Ida (Frostproof, Florida), a lake on the north side of Frostproof, Florida
- Lake Ida (Douglas County, Minnesota)
- Lake Ida Township, Norman County, Minnesota
- Lake Ida (Washington)
