= Augusta Lake =

Augusta Lake or Lake Augusta is the name of the following lakes:

== Australia ==
- Lake Augusta (Tasmania)
- Lake Augusta (Western Australia)

== Canada ==
- Augusta Lake (Sudbury District), Ontario
- Augusta Lake (Thunder Bay District), Ontario

== United States ==
- Augusta Lake (Illinois), a reservoir
- Augusta Lake (Kansas)
- Augusta Lake (Cottonwood County, Minnesota)
- Augusta Lake (Dakota County, Minnesota), near Minneapolis-St. Paul
- Lake Augusta (Pennsylvania)
- Lake Augusta (Washington)
