= Lake Edna =

Lake in Washington state, US

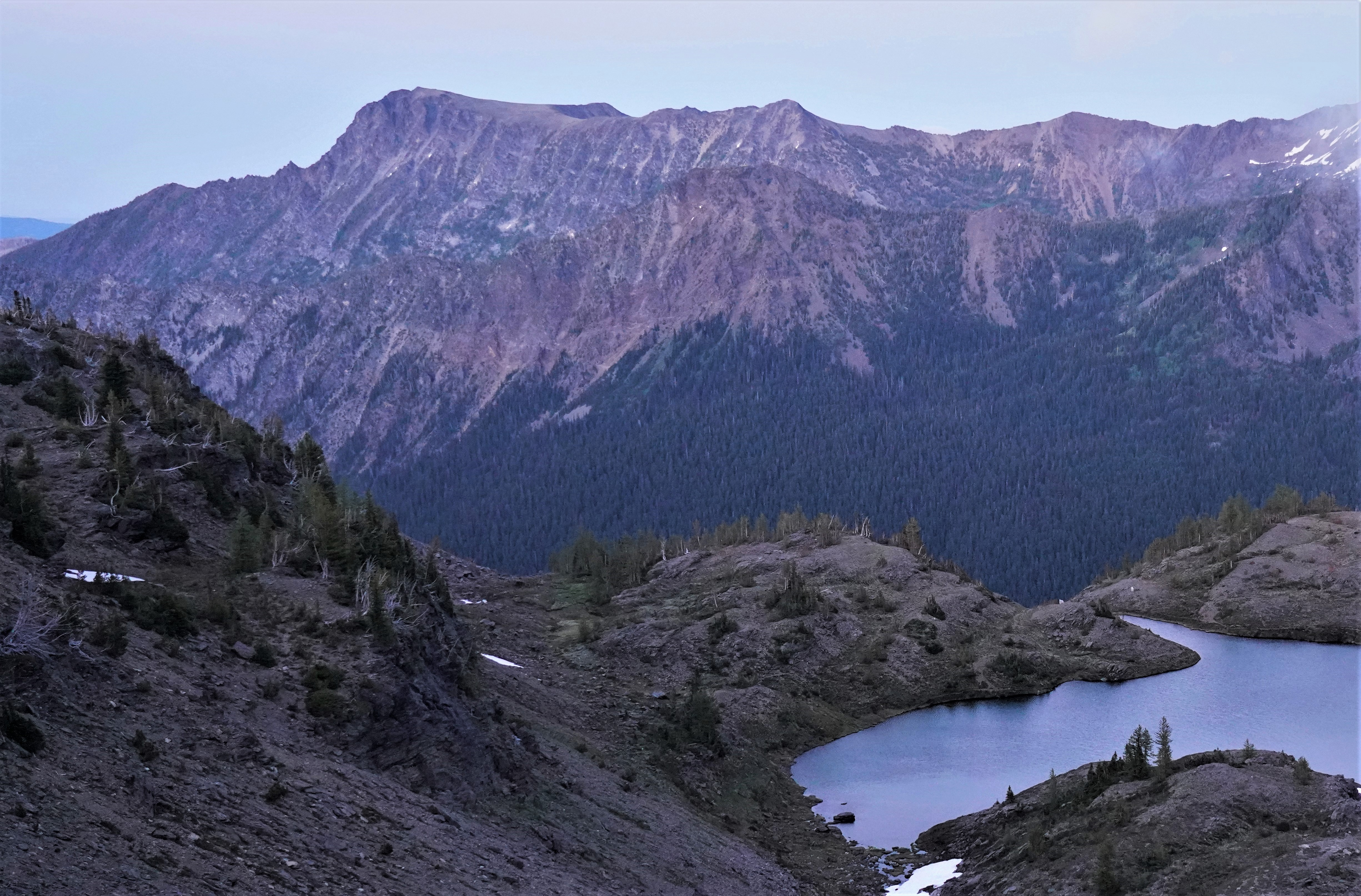
- Lake Edna, Big Jim Mountain in the background

- Location within Washington (state) Location within the United States
- Location: Chelan County, Washington, United States
- Coordinates: 47°39′25″N 120°54′44″W
- Basin countries: United States
- Surface elevation: 6,755 ft (2,059 m)

Lake Edna is a freshwater lake located along Icicle Ridge, approximately 10 miles west of the city of Leavenworth in Chelan County, Washington. Because of its close proximity to Icicle Ridge Trail, the lake is a popular area for hiking, swimming, and fishing. Lake Alice is a short distance in a prominent cirque on the opposite side of Icicle Ridge.

Lake Edna sits on a highly glaciated and semibarren alpine basin, surrounded by heather and other wildflowers and a coniferous presence primarily larch pines. Self-issued Alpine Lake Wilderness permit required for transit within the Lake Edna area.

Along with neighboring lakes, Lake Edna was given its name by Albert Hale Sylvester, a topographer for the United States Geological Survey working throughout the North Cascades National Park Complex in the 1900s.

== Access ==
The foot trail starts at the Chatter Creek Trailhead at the end of USFS Road 7609 on the north bank of Icicle Creek. Chatter Creek Trail #1580 is approximately 5.5 miles long and travels fairly closely to the course of Chatter Creek. The trail leads past Lake Sylvester and Lake Alice reaching and joining Icicle Ridge Trail #1580 on the north skirt of Grindstone mountain. Access to Lake Edna is right off Icicle Ridge Trail to the right (east) of its junction with Chatter Creek Trail. Icicle Ridge Trail shortly afterwards will follow the ridge to Lake Ida on the right and Lake Augusta over the east slope of Big Jim Mountain.

Campsites are located along the first few miles of Chatter Creek Trail until the trail becomes more forested around the bowls formed for Lakes Sylvester and Alice. Several campsites are also located around the shore of Lake Augusta, past Lake Edna. Self-issued Alpine Lake Wilderness permit required for transit within the Grindstone Mountain area and can be obtained at the Chatter Creek Trailhead and the Campground past the Guard station.

=== Alternate routes ===
Access to Icicle Ridge Trail can also be gained a further distance away by Fourth of July Trail #1579 and from the Icicle Ridge Trailhead off Icicle Road in the city of Leavenworth. Icicle Ridge is also intersected by Hatchery Creek Trail #1577 a short distance from Lake Edna coming from the north.

The Hatchery Creek Trailhead is approximately 6 miles from the Icicle Ridge Junction and is located West of Tumwater Campground as Highway 2 crosses over Wenatchee River, south of Chiwaukum, Washington. A good part of Hatchery Creek Trail is overgrown by fireweed and charred logs remnants of the Hatchery Fire of 1994.

== See also ==
- List of lakes of the Alpine Lakes Wilderness
