= Alexandria, Minnesota =

City in Minnesota, United States

- City
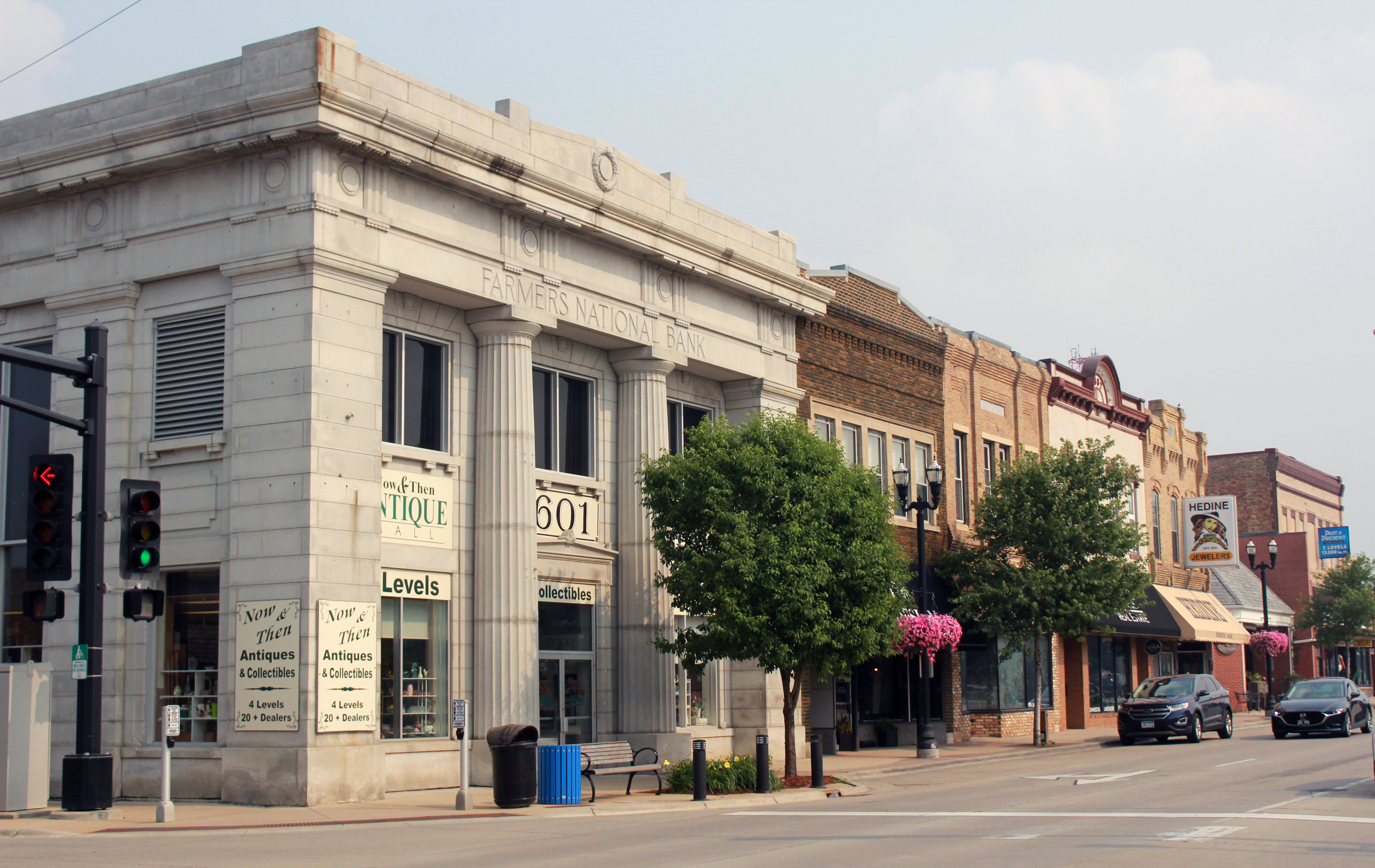
- Businesses on southwest corner of Broadway Street at 6th Avenue

- Logo
- Nicknames: Alex, Alec, the Birthplace of America
- Motto: "The Runestone City"
- Location of the city of Alexandria within Douglas County, Minnesota
- Coordinates: 45°52′39″N 95°22′36″W
- Country: United States
- State: Minnesota
- County: Douglas
- Settled: 1858
- Founded: 1859
- Incorporated: February 20, 1877

Government
  - Mayor: Bobbie Osterberg

Area
  - City: 17.904 sq mi (46.371 km^{2})
  - Land: 17.189 sq mi (44.520 km^{2})
  - Water: 0.715 sq mi (1.852 km^{2}) 4.43%
- Elevation: 1,414 ft (431 m)

Population (2020)
  - City: 14,335
  - Estimate (2023): 14,943
  - Density: 869/sq mi (335.6/km^{2})
  - Urban: 18,957
  - Metro: 39,953 (US: 317th)
- Time zone: UTC−6 (Central (CST))
  - Summer (DST): UTC−5 (CDT)
- ZIP Code: 56308
- Area code: 320
- FIPS code: 27-00928
- GNIS feature ID: 2393918
- Sales tax: 7.375%
- Website: alexandriamn.city

Alexandria is a city in and the county seat of Douglas County, Minnesota, United States. The population was 14,335 as of the 2020 census. I-94 passes through Alexandria, along with Minnesota State Highways 27 and 29. It is ten miles (16 km) south of Lake Carlos State Park.

== History ==
First settled in 1858, it was named after brothers Alexander and William Kinkead from Maryland. The form of the name alludes to Alexandria, Egypt, a center of learning and civilization.

The village of Alexandria was incorporated February 20, 1877. Its city charter was adopted in 1908, and it was incorporated as a city in 1909. W. E. Hicks was pivotal to the town's early development. He purchased the townsite in 1868 and established a mill, hotel, newspaper, and store. He donated property for a courthouse, jail, and two churches: Methodist and Congregational.

The Kensington Runestone, a purported artifact left behind by pre-Columbian Norse explorers of the region, was uncovered by farmer Olaf Ohman near Alexandria in 1898. Despite scholarly consensus identifying the stone as a hoax, the stone quickly became a symbol of Alexandria and western Minnesota writ large. The stone is housed in the Runestone Museum, and is commemorated with a 28-foot-tall statue of a viking, "Big Ole", whose shield bears the slogan "Alexandria: The Birthplace of America". The statue, originally built for the 1964 New York World's Fair, currently stands at the north end of the downtown, on the shore of Lake Agnes.

== Geography ==
According to the United States Census Bureau, the city has an area of 17.904 square miles (46.37 km^{2}), of which 17.189 square miles (44.52 km^{2}) is land and 0.715 square miles (1.85 km^{2}) is water. Many of the people who live in Alexandria are not calculated into the population because they are spread out of the city and live on and around the many lakes.

=== Climate ===
Alexandria has a dry-winter warm-summer humid continental climate (Köppen Dwb), with cold, snowy winters and warm (sometimes hot and humid) summers. The autumn and spring are generally pleasant. Average annual precipitation (both snow and rain) is about 25 inches.

Climate data for Alexandria, Minnesota (Alexandria Municipal Airport), 1991–2020 normals, extremes 1940–present
Month	Jan	Feb	Mar	Apr	May	Jun	Jul	Aug	Sep	Oct	Nov	Dec	Year
Record high °F (°C)	58 (14)	58 (14)	78 (26)	95 (35)	97 (36)	102 (39)	101 (38)	104 (40)	98 (37)	91 (33)	76 (24)	58 (14)	104 (40)
Mean maximum °F (°C)	40.1 (4.5)	43.5 (6.4)	58.7 (14.8)	76.8 (24.9)	87.1 (30.6)	90.6 (32.6)	91.3 (32.9)	89.7 (32.1)	85.9 (29.9)	78.3 (25.7)	59.8 (15.4)	42.4 (5.8)	93.7 (34.3)
Mean daily maximum °F (°C)	19.0 (−7.2)	23.7 (−4.6)	36.6 (2.6)	52.4 (11.3)	66.3 (19.1)	75.7 (24.3)	80.2 (26.8)	78.3 (25.7)	69.9 (21.1)	54.5 (12.5)	37.6 (3.1)	24.2 (−4.3)	51.5 (10.8)
Daily mean °F (°C)	10.7 (−11.8)	14.9 (−9.5)	28.0 (−2.2)	42.5 (5.8)	55.9 (13.3)	66.0 (18.9)	70.6 (21.4)	68.5 (20.3)	60.0 (15.6)	45.7 (7.6)	30.3 (−0.9)	16.9 (−8.4)	42.5 (5.8)
Mean daily minimum °F (°C)	2.3 (−16.5)	6.0 (−14.4)	19.4 (−7.0)	32.7 (0.4)	45.5 (7.5)	56.4 (13.6)	60.9 (16.1)	58.7 (14.8)	50.1 (10.1)	37.0 (2.8)	23.0 (−5.0)	9.6 (−12.4)	33.5 (0.8)
Mean minimum °F (°C)	−20.6 (−29.2)	−16.4 (−26.9)	−5.3 (−20.7)	17.0 (−8.3)	32.6 (0.3)	44.3 (6.8)	50.6 (10.3)	48.1 (8.9)	35.0 (1.7)	21.6 (−5.8)	4.4 (−15.3)	−14.3 (−25.7)	−23.3 (−30.7)
Record low °F (°C)	−38 (−39)	−34 (−37)	−34 (−37)	−2 (−19)	18 (−8)	33 (1)	42 (6)	38 (3)	21 (−6)	9 (−13)	−18 (−28)	−32 (−36)	−38 (−39)
Average precipitation inches (mm)	0.38 (9.7)	0.41 (10)	1.00 (25)	2.04 (52)	3.05 (77)	3.72 (94)	4.00 (102)	3.46 (88)	2.63 (67)	2.21 (56)	0.83 (21)	0.36 (9.1)	24.09 (612)
Average precipitation days (≥ 0.01 in)	3.6	3.7	5.2	9.0	11.5	12.3	10.8	9.5	8.8	8.6	4.8	4.5	92.3
Source: NOAA

=== Lakes ===
- Lake Agnes
- Lake Alvin
- Lake Andrew
- Blackwell Lake
- Lake Brophy
- Lake Burgen
- Lake Carlos
- Cork Lake
- Lake Cowdry
- Lake Darling
- Echo Lake
- Lake Geneva
- Lake George
- Grant Lake
- Lake Henry
- Lake Ida
- Lake Irene
- Lake Jessie
- Lake Latoka
- Laura Lake
- Lake Le Homme Dieu
- Lake Louise
- Maple Lake
- Lake Mary
- Mill Lake
- Lake Miltona
- Lake Mina
- Mud Lake
- North Union Lake
- Lake Oscar
- Pocket Lake
- Rachel Lake
- Lake Reno
- Smith Lake
- Lobster Lake
- Stony Lake
- Taylor Lake
- Lake Charley
- Union Lake
- Lake Winona
- Vermont Lake
- Lake Victoria

== Demographics ==
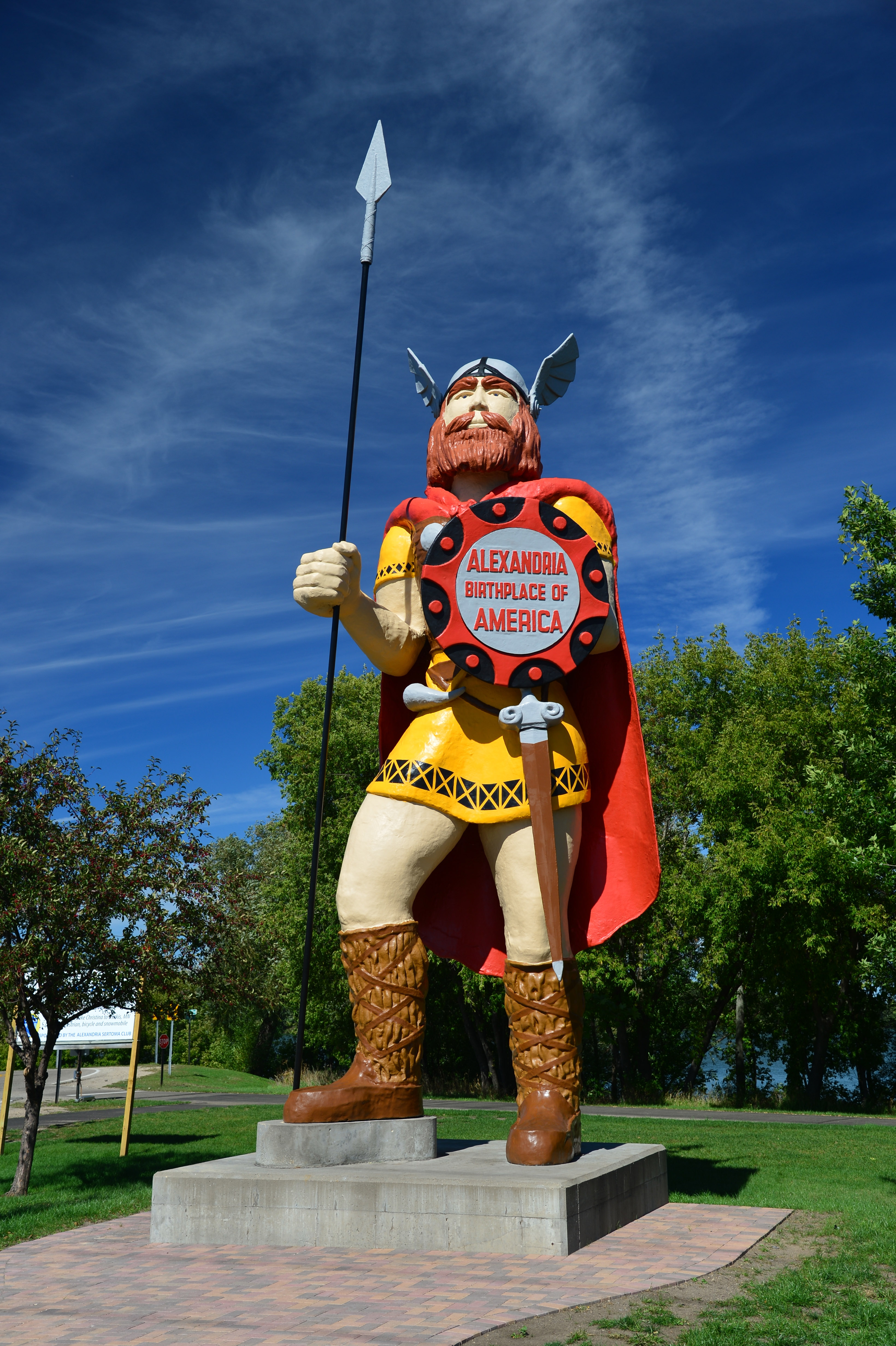
Statue of Big Ole the Viking, greeting visitors to Alexandria

Historical population
Census	Pop.	Note	%±
1880	1,355		—
1890	2,118		56.3%
1900	2,681		26.6%
1910	3,001		11.9%
1920	3,388		12.9%
1930	3,876		14.4%
1940	5,051		30.3%
1950	6,319		25.1%
1960	6,713		6.2%
1970	6,973		3.9%
1980	7,608		9.1%
1990	7,838		3.0%
2000	8,820		12.5%
2010	11,070		25.5%
2020	14,335		29.5%
2023 (est.)	14,943		4.2%
U.S. Decennial Census; 2020 Census

=== 2020 census ===
As of the 2020 census, Alexandria had a population of 14,335, with 6,566 households and 3,338 families residing in the city.

The median age was 40.1 years. 20.4% of residents were under the age of 18, 5.9% were under the age of 5, and 23.5% were 65 years of age or older. For every 100 females there were 92.6 males, and for every 100 females age 18 and over there were 89.5 males age 18 and over.

100.0% of residents lived in urban areas, while 0.0% lived in rural areas.

The population density was 1,735.0 inhabitants per square mile (669.9/km^{2}). There were 7,321 housing units, of which 10.3% were vacant. The homeowner vacancy rate was 1.6% and the rental vacancy rate was 7.6%.

Alexandria, Minnesota – Racial Composition (NH = Non-Hispanic) Note: the US Census treats Hispanic/Latino as an ethnic category. This table excludes Latinos from the racial categories and assigns them to a separate category. Hispanics/Latinos can be of any race.
Race	Number	Percentage
White (NH)	13,018	90.8%
Black or African American (NH)	168	1.2%
Native American or Alaska Native (NH)	47	0.3%
Asian (NH)	146	1.0%
Pacific Islander (NH)	7	0.0%
Some Other Race (NH)	19	0.1%
Mixed/Multi-Racial (NH)	438	3.1%
Hispanic or Latino	492	3.4%
Total	14,335	100.0%

=== 2010 census ===
As of the 2010 census, there were 11,070 people, 5,298 households, and 2,552 families living in the city. The population density was 693.6 inhabitants per square mile (267.8/km^{2}). There were 5,821 housing units at an average density of 364.7 per square mile (140.8/km^{2}). The racial makeup of the city was 96.3% White, 0.8% African American, 0.4% Native American, 0.7% Asian, 0.3% from other races, and 1.4% from two or more races. Hispanic or Latino of any race were 1.5% of the population.

There were 5,298 households, of which 21.8% had children under the age of 18 living with them, 35.2% were married couples living together, 9.5% had a female householder with no husband present, 3.4% had a male householder with no wife present, and 51.8% were non-families. 41.8% of all households were made up of individuals, and 18.5% had someone living alone who was 65 years of age or older. The average household size was 2.02 and the average family size was 2.74.

The median age in the city was 38.8 years. 19.1% of residents were under the age of 18; 13.3% were between the ages of 18 and 24; 23.6% were from 25 to 44; 22.1% were from 45 to 64; and 22% were 65 years of age or older. The gender makeup of the city was 48.3% male and 51.7% female.

=== 2000 census ===
As of the 2000 census, there were 8,820 people. The census listed 4,047 households and 2,011 families living in the city. The population density was 992.5 inhabitants per square mile (383.2/km^{2}). There were 4,311 housing units at an average density of 485.1 per square mile (187.3/km^{2}). The city's racial makeup was 97.94% White, 0.42% African American, 0.34% Native American, 0.57% Asian, 0.06% Pacific Islander, 0.18% from other races, and 0.50% from two or more races. Hispanic or Latino of any race were 0.80% of the population.

There were 4,047 households, of which 23.7% had children under 18 living with them, 36.5% were married couples living together, 10.4% had a female householder with no husband present, and 50.3% were non-families. 41.1% of all households were made up of individuals, and 19.3% had someone living alone who 65 or older. The average household size was 2.06 and the average family size was 2.81.

In the city, the population was spread out, with 20.0% under 18, 15.7% from 18 to 24, 24.0% from 25 to 44, 16.7% from 45 to 64, and 23.5% over 66. The median age was 37. For every 100 females, there were 87.2 males. For every 100 females 18 and over, there were 83.7 males.

The median income for a household was $26,851, and the median income for a family was $38,245. Males had a median income of $27,871 versus $20,254 for females. The per capita income was $16,085. About 7.8% of families and 13.3% of the population were below the poverty line, including 14.2% of those under 18 and 15.7% of those 65 or older.

== Tourism ==
=== Resorts ===
The city is located along a chain of lakes, which makes it a popular resort destination for water and land activities. There are cabin B&Bs and chain hotels along the lakes. Water sporting activities include motorboats, wake surfing, sailing, paddleboarding. Fishing was also historically popular in the city. There are beaches, like in the Pilgrim Point Park on Lake Ida. Other park areas include Lake Brophy County Park and Kensington Rune Stone Park.

=== Events ===
Local tourism events include:

- Grape Stomp hosted by the Carlos Creek Winery every September
- An Apple Fest in October
- The Douglas County Fair every August
- Big Ole Paddlefest every July, a kayaking race on Lake Miltona
- Art in the Park every July.
- Red Willow Arts Coalition Outdoor hosts concerts every Thursday in summer.

=== Attractions ===
The city has a museum housing the Kensington Runestone. Outside the museum stands Big Ole, a 25-foot-tall statue of a Viking built for the 1965 World's Fair in New York City. Extensive repairs to Big Ole were completed in 2016. Legacy of the Lakes Museum, a maritime museum, is located in the city.

== Economy ==
=== Top employers ===
According to the Alexandria Area Economic Development Commission, the area's top employers are:

#	Employer	# of Employees
1	Alomere Health	868
2	Douglas Machine, Inc.	737
3	Alexandria Public Schools	609
4	Knute Nelson	482
5	Alexandria Industries	437
6	3M	400
7	Central Specialties	325
8	Douglas County	308
9	Brenton Engineering	265
10	Aagard	264

== Education ==
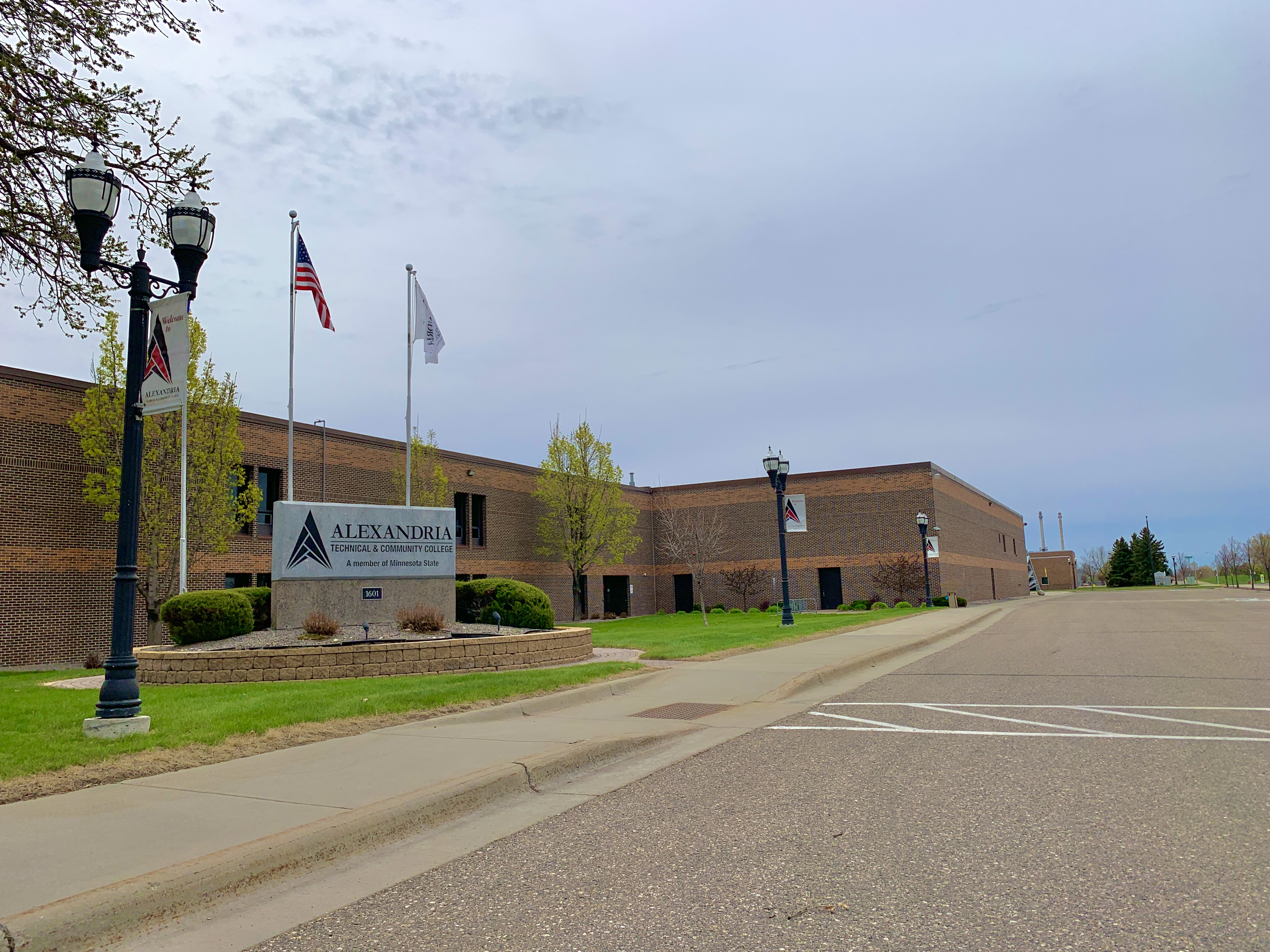
Alexandria Technical & Community College

Most children in Alexandria attend school at Alexandria Public Schools, which consists of six kindergarten–5th grade elementary schools (Lincoln, Voyager, Woodland, Carlos, Miltona, Garfield), one 6th–8th grade junior high school (Discovery Middle School), and one 9th–12th grade senior high school (Alexandria Area High School), which replaced Jefferson High School, which was built in the late 1950s. There are also several independent K–8 Christian schools in the area. Alexandria Technical & Community College offers post-secondary education, including certificate programs, 2-year associate degrees and transferable credits towards 4-year degrees.

== Transportation ==
County Road 82 (former State Highway 27) connects Alexandria to Nelson, Osakis and western Minnesota. Minnesota State Highway 29 connects Alexandria to Glenwood and Parkers Prairie. Interstate 94/U.S. Highway 52 passes through the south end of Alexandria, which allows access to Minneapolis-St. Paul and Fargo-Moorhead.

Public transportation in town (and within the surrounding area) is provided by Rainbow Rider.

=== Airport ===
The Alexandria Municipal Airport, also known as Chandler Field, is a city-owned public-use airport two nautical miles (3.7 km) southwest of Alexandria's central business district.

== Media ==
=== Newspaper ===
Alexandria Echo Press is Alexandria's twice-weekly newspaper, owned by the Forum Communications Company.

=== Television ===
From 1958 until 2012, Alexandria had at least one local television station, either KCCO or KSAX, and both are still satellites of Minneapolis, MN television stations. KCCO had a presence, first as KCMT, in 1958, as an NBC and ABC affiliate. It switched to CBS affiliation in 1982. Five years later, KSAX regained ABC's presence as a semi-satellite of KSTP-TV. In that same year, KCCO was bought out and became a semi-satellite of WCCO-TV. In 1992, KCCO became a CBS O&O when CBS acquired WCCO and its two satellites.

During KCCO and KSAX's time as semi-satellites, they broadcast local news, weather, and sports through ten-minute cut-in segments during their parent station's newscast. In 2002, KCCO removed its local presence and became a full satellite of WCCO. In June 2012, cost-cutting measures at KSAX resulted in the layoff of all but two employees and the ending of local cut-in broadcasts by any Alexandria television station.

The Alexandria area is also served by Selective TV, Inc., a non-profit, viewer-supported organization which transmits several cable channels free-to-air over standard UHF television frequencies, viewable in any area home without subscription. Selective TV operates under low power television rules of the FCC and as such was not subject to the analog to digital conversion in 2009. Residents still need a converter box to view KCCO and KSAX on the digital band, though KSAX is still rebroadcast via Selective TV.

=== Broadcast ===
Channel	Callsign	Affiliation	Branding	Subchannels		Owner
(Virtual)	Callsign	Affiliation	Branding	Channel	Programming	Owner
4.1	K33DB-D (WCCO Translator)	CBS	WCCO	4.2; 4.3; 4.4; 4.5	Start TV; Dabl; Outlaw; Nosey	Selective TV, Inc.
5.2	K16CO-D (KSTC Translator)	Independent	45tv	5.3; 5.4; 5.5; 5.6	MeTV; Great; Traffic cameras MeTV Toons	Selective TV, Inc.
9.2	K30AF-D (WFTC Translator)	Ind./MyTV	FOX 9 Plus	9.1; 9.3; 9.7	Fox; Movies! Fox Weather	Selective TV, Inc.
9.9	K32EB-D (KMSP Translator)	FOX	FOX 9	9.4; 9.5; 9.6; 9.8; 9.9; 9.10	Buzzr; QVC; Catchy Comedy; Story Television; Fox; MyNetworkTV	Selective TV, Inc.
10.1	K27KN-D (KWCM Translator)	PBS	Pioneer Public TV	10.2; 10.3; 10.4; 10.5	Create; Minnesota Channel; World; PBS Kids	Selective TV, Inc.
11.1	K26CL-D (KARE Translator)	NBC	KARE 11	11.2; 11.3; 11.4; 11.5; 11.7; 11.8	Quest; True Crime; Shop LC; The Nest; Blank; HSN	Selective TV, Inc.
17.1	K17NW-D	NASA TV				Selective TV, Inc.
18.1	K18DG-D (KSAX Translator)	ABC	5 Eyewitness News			Selective TV, Inc.
20.1	K20AC-D	Escape		20.2; 20.3; 20.4; 20.5	Newsmax TV; C-SPAN; MSNBC; Bounce TV	Selective TV, Inc.
21.1	K21GN-D	KOOL-TV		21.2; 21.3; 21.4; 21.5	Reelz-TV; Grit; LALA-TV; Laff	Selective TV, Inc.
22.1	K36KH-D (KAWB Translator)	PBS	Lakeland PBS	22.2; 22.3; 22.4; 22.5; 22.6	First Nations Experience; PBS Kids; Create; PBS Encore; Minnesota Channel	Selective TV, Inc.
23.1	K14LZ-D (WUCW Translator)	CW	CW 23	23.2; 23.3; 23.4; 23.5; 23.6	Comet; Charge! Roar; Rewind TV; Antenna TV	Selective TV, Inc.
41.1	K34AF-D (KPXM Translator)	ION	ION	41.2; 41.3; 41.4; 41.5; 41.6; 41.7; 41.8	Bounce TV; Grit; Ion Mystery; Laff; Court TV; Busted; QVC	Selective TV, Inc.
42.1	KSAX (KSTP/KSTC Satellite)	ABC	5 Eyewitness News	42.2; 42.3; 42.4	45tv MeTV; Traffic cameras	Hubbard Broadcasting
44.1	K44GH-D	3ABN		44.2; 44.4; 44.5; 44.6; 44.7	3ABN Proclaim; 3ABN Spanish; 3ABN Radio; 3ABN Radio Spanish; Radio 74	Edge Spectrum, Inc.

=== Radio ===
AM radio stations
Frequency	Call sign	Name	Format	Owner
1490	KXRA		News/Talk	Leighton Media

FM radio stations
Frequency	Call sign	Name	Format	Owner
90.9	K215BL (KSJR Translator)	Classical MPR	Classical	Minnesota Public Radio
91.7	K219FA (WJFM Translator)	SonLife Radio	Christian	Jimmy Swaggart Ministries
92.3	KXRA	KX92	Classic rock	Leighton Media
94.3	KULO	Cool 94.3	Oldies	Hubbard Broadcasting
97.3	KRVY	97.3 The River	Adult Contemporary	Iowa City Broadcasting Company, Inc.
98.5	KLKX	K-Lakes 98.5	Adult Standards	Alexandria Community Radio Educational Organization, Inc.
99.3	KXRZ	Z-99	Hot AC	Leighton Media
100.3	K262AT (KXRA-AM Translator)		News/Talk	Leighton Media
100.7	KIKV	KIK FM 100.7	Country	Hubbard Broadcasting

=== Other forms ===
The city's unofficial mascot "Big Ole" is featured on the cover of the debut album of the National Beekeepers Society.

== Culture ==
The city hosts the annual Vikingland Band Festival parade marching championship.

A 2018 article in The Oregonian described Alexandria as "conservative-leaning".

== Sports ==
The Alexandria Blizzard is a Tier III junior ice hockey team in the North American 3 Hockey League and play out of the Runestone Community Center. From 2006 to 2012, the organization had a Tier II team in the North American Hockey League. The NAHL franchise relocated to Brookings, South Dakota and the current NA3HL franchise took its place.

Viking Speedway hosts weekly Saturday night dirt track racing from April–September and also periodic special, weekend events throughout the year. Five WISSOTA classes run there: Street Stocks, Midwest Modifieds, Super Stocks, Modifieds, and Late Models. Viking Speedway was awarded WISSOTA's "2005 Track of the Year".

One night per summer, a Northwoods League baseball game is held at Knute Nelson Memorial Park. The Willmar Stingers become the Alexandria Beetles to pay homage to the time when Alexandria had its own team. The Beetles were in operation from 2001 to 2012 and were renamed the Alexandria Blue Anchors in 2013. The team folded after the 2015 season.

== Notable people ==
- Lars K. Aaker, state legislator
- Richard Battey, judge
- Hilda Bettermann, state representative
- Marvin W. Bursch, state legislator and businessman
- Dave Dalby, center for the Oakland Raiders
- Walter H. Campbell, state legislator, businessman and lawyer
- Frederick J. Foslien, state legislator, farmer, and businessman
- Mary Franson, Minnesota State House Representative
- John Hammergren, CEO of McKesson Corporation
- Duane Hanson, sculptor
- Edward Hanson, 28th governor of American Samoa
- Jennifer and Sarah Hart, perpetrators of the Hart family murders
- Hal Haskins, professional basketball player
- John Hawkes, actor
- Todd Hendricks, professional football player
- Bill Ingebrigtsen, former Minnesota State Senator
- Jed Johnson, interior designer and film director
- Peter Krause, actor
- Tom Lehman, PGA golfer
- Brock Lesnar, professional wrestler and former mixed martial artist
- Clifford Lofvegren, state legislator, businessman, and farmer
- Knute Nelson, U.S. senator
- Julian O. Newhouse, businessman and state legislator
- Richard Peterson, architect, fighter ace
- Walter Roth, farmer and state legislator
- Gary Serum, pitcher for the Minnesota Twins
- Henrik Shipstead, U.S. senator
- Bruce P. Smith, halfback for the Green Bay Packers and the Los Angeles Rams
- Cliff Sterrett, cartoonist
- Torrey Westrom, Minnesota State Senator
- Hill H. Wilson, businessman and state legislator
- Theodore G. Winkjer, businessman, farmer, and state legislator

== See also ==
- Alexandria Lakes AVA
