= Lake Agnes =

Lake Agnes may refer to:

- Lake Agnes (Alberta) in Banff National Park, Alberta, Canada
- Lake Agnes (Colorado) in Colorado, United States
- Lake Agnes (Florida) in Florida, United States, site of Fantasy_of_flight
- Lake Agnes (Minnesota)
- Lake Agnes (New Zealand), a mountain lake near the Hollyford Valley, in the South Island of New Zealand
- Lake Agnes in the Hunter Island region of the Quetico Provincial Park, northern Ontario, Canada.
