= Newhouse (surname) =

Newhouse is an English surname. Notable people with the surname include:

- Alana Newhouse (born 1976), American writer and editor
- Dan Newhouse (born 1955), American politician
- Dave Newhouse (born 1953), American musician
- Donald Newhouse (1929–2026), American publisher
- Flower A. Newhouse (1909–1994), Christian mystic and spiritual teacher
- Fred Newhouse (1948–2025), American runner
- Joseph Newhouse (born 1942), American economist
- Julian O. Newhouse (1915–2006), American businessman and politician
- Mark Newhouse (born 1985), American poker player
- Neil Newhouse, American pollster
- Richard H. Newhouse, Jr. (1924–2002), American politician
- Robert Newhouse, (1950–2014), American football player
- Samuel Newhouse (1853–1930), American mining magnate from Utah
- Samuel Irving Newhouse, Sr. (1895–1979) American broadcasting businessman, magazine and newspaper publisher
- Samuel Irving Newhouse, Jr. (1927–2017), chairman and CEO of Advance Publications
