= Walter Campbell =

Walter Campbell may refer to:

- Sir Walter Campbell (judge) (1921–2004), Australian judge and governor of Queensland, Australia
- Walter Campbell (field hockey) (1886–1967), Irish athlete in field hockey
- Walter Campbell of Shawfield (1741–1816), rector of the University of Glasgow, 1789–1791
- Skip Campbell (Walter G. Campbell, 1948–2018), mayor of Coral Springs
- Walter G. Campbell (chemist) (1877–1963), American chemist
- Walter H. Campbell (1876–1944), American businessman, lawyer, and politician
- Walter Frederick Campbell (1798–1855), Scottish politician
- Walter Campbell (British Army officer) (1864–1936), former Quartermaster-General to the Forces
- Walter Menzies Campbell (1941–2025), British sprinter and politician
- Walter Ruggles Campbell (1890–1981), Canadian physician and diabetologist
- Walter Stanley Campbell (1877–1957), American author who wrote as Stanley Vestal
- Walter Campbell Smith (1887–1988), British mineralogist, in later life formally known as Walter Campbell-Smith
- Walter E. Campbell (died 1993), Boston architect, founding partner at Campbell, Aldrich & Nulty

== See also ==
- Wally Campbell (1926–1954), stock car, midget, and sprint car racer
- Wal Campbell, Australian anti-Catholic journalist
