= Reedy Lake (Frostproof, Florida) =

Coordinates: 27.74158°N 81.49452°W

- Location within Florida Location within the United States
- Location: Polk County, Florida
- Type: Natural freshwater lake
- Primary inflows: creek flowing from Lake Ida
- Primary outflows: Reedy Creek
- Basin countries: United States
- Max. length: 3.24 mi (5.21 km)
- Max. width: 1.76 mi (2.83 km)
- Surface area: 3,504 acres (1,418 ha)
- Average depth: 12.0 ft (3.7 m)
- Max. depth: 19.0 ft (5.8 m)
- Water volume: 14,509,861,268 US gal (5.492579983×10^{10} L; 1.2081986900×10^{10} imp gal)
- Surface elevation: 75 ft (23 m)
- Settlements: Frostproof, Florida

Reedy Lake is a natural freshwater lake on the east side of Frostproof, Florida. Residences and citrus groves surround much of this lake. This lake has no public swimming areas. The city of Frostproof has a public fishing pier and it operates Henderson Field (a softball field) nearby. A public boat ramp also exists at Frostproof.
