= Bursch =

Bursch is a German surname. Notable people with the surname include:

- Daniel W. Bursch (born 1957), American astronaut
- John J. Bursch (born 1972), American lawyer
- Marvin W. Bursch (1917–2000), American businessman and politician
