= Big Jim Mountain Lakes =

Lakes in Washington, United States

- Location within Washington (state) Location within the United States
- Location: Chelan County, Washington, United States
- Coordinates: 47.6662365°N 120.8233391°W
- Primary outflows: Battle Canyon Creek
- Basin countries: United States
- Surface elevation: 6,309 ft (1,923 m)

Big Jim Mountain Lakes are a set of small freshwater lakes located on the northeast skirt of Big Jim Mountain, East of Icicle Ridge, in Chelan County, Washington. Because of its close proximity to Icicle Ridge Trail, the lake is a popular area for hiking, swimming, and fishing. Lake Augusta is a short distance on the opposite side of Icicle Ridge. The lakes are located approximately 2.5 miles from a trail junction area called "The Badlands".

== Geography ==
The Big Jim Mountain Lakes are located on the northern skirt of Big Jim Mountain, consisting of rocky soils of intrusive rock geology. The exposed rock tends to be quartz-dolerite and granodiorite with influence from the intrusions originated from the Mount Stuart Batholith which underlies the Stuart Range and the nearby Wenatchee Mountains. This batholith is about 13 by 16 miles in extent. Two plutonic masses are separated by a thin screen of Chiwaukum Schist and rocks of the Ingalls Complex. The more-eastern pluton is 93 million years old, while the more-western rock mass is between 83 and 86 million years old.

The trail to the lakes consists of sandy loam the first half and boulders added in the second half of the trajectory. The west hills of Big Jim Mountain surrounding Lake Augusta grow tonalite and granodiorite corona-bearing dikes. The East hill grew pyroxenites, gabbro amphibolites and other diorites. Mineral boundaries are sharp along Big Jim Mountain except between these two matrix subdomains, which are not immediately distinguishable.

== See also ==
- List of lakes of the Alpine Lakes Wilderness
