= KLKX =

KLKX may refer to:

- KLKX-LP, a low-power radio station (98.5 FM) licensed to serve Alexandria, Minnesota, United States
- KQAV, a radio station (93.5 FM) licensed to serve Rosamond, California, United States, which held the call sign KLKX from 1993 to 2010
