= List of mountain ranges in Washington =

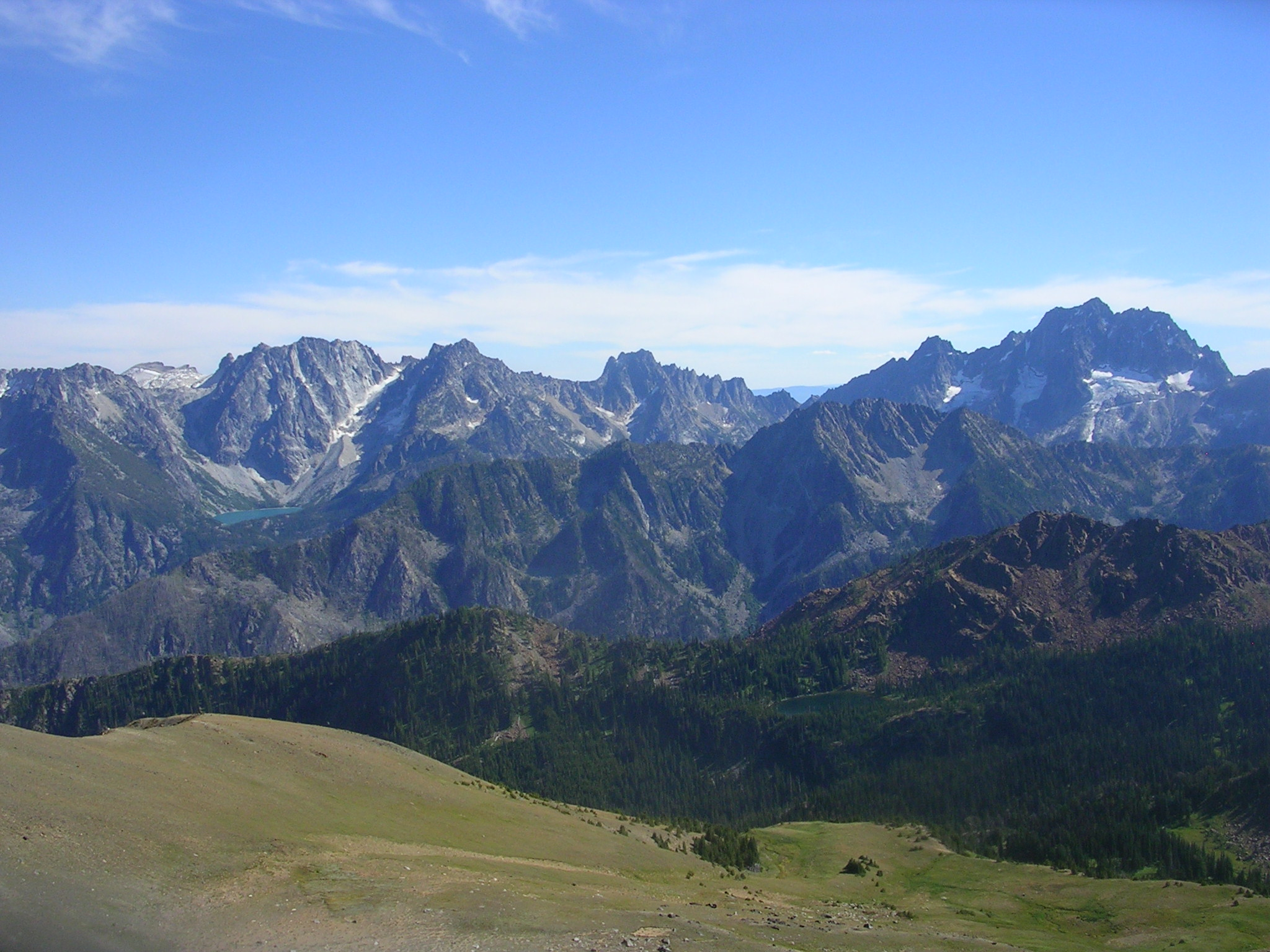
Stuart Range from Cashmere Peak

There are at least 64 named mountain ranges in the U.S. state of Washington. Names, elevations and coordinates from the U.S. Geological Survey, Geographic Names Information System and trail guides published by The Mountaineers. Some of the ranges extend into neighboring states of Idaho and Oregon and British Columbia, Canada.

Range	County	Elevation	Coordinates	GNIS Citation
Bailey Range	Clallam County, Washington	5,627 ft (1,715 m)	47°49′55″N 123°34′11″W	
Beezley Hills	Grant County, Washington	2,717 ft (828 m)	47°19′34″N 119°45′35″W	
Black Hills	Thurston County, Washington	2,543 ft (775 m)	46°59′14″N 123°08′16″W	
Blue Mountains	Union County, Oregon	9,108 ft (2,776 m)	45°30′00″N 118°00′05″W	
Boylston Mountains	Kittitas County, Washington	3,435 ft (1,047 m)	46°54′02″N 120°16′26″W	
Cascade Range	Pierce County, Washington	14,409 ft (4,392 m)	46°51′10″N 121°45′37″W	
Cedar Hills	King County, Washington	659 ft (201 m)	47°27′51″N 122°03′23″W	
Chelan Mountains	Chelan County, Washington	6,995 ft (2,132 m)	48°04′58″N 120°34′56″W	
Chiwaukum Mountains	Chelan County, Washington	6,562 ft (2,000 m)	47°44′22″N 120°54′31″W	
Coleman Hill	Douglas County, Washington	2,336 ft (712 m)	47°58′04″N 119°36′06″W	
Columbia Hills	Klickitat County, Washington	2,667 ft (813 m)	45°44′24″N 120°47′09″W	
Crazy Hills	Skamania County, Washington	4,094 ft (1,248 m)	46°04′20″N 121°52′49″W	
Cultus Mountains	Skagit County, Washington	4,094 ft (1,248 m)	48°25′15″N 122°06′57″W	
Doty Hills	Lewis County, Washington	2,428 ft (740 m)	46°42′35″N 123°19′21″W	
Elwha River Range	Clallam County, Washington	4,606 ft (1,404 m)	48°01′13″N 123°31′38″W	
Enchantment Peaks	Chelan County, Washington	8,373 ft (2,552 m)	47°29′16″N 120°48′23″W	
Entiat Mountains	Chelan County, Washington	5,207 ft (1,587 m)	47°46′21″N 120°32′41″W	
Frenchman Hills	Grant County, Washington	1,640 ft (500 m)	46°58′29″N 119°49′30″W	
Green Mountain	Clark County, Washington	1,844 ft (562 m)	45°57′41″N 122°27′45″W	
Hog Ranch Buttes	Yakima County, Washington	4,206 ft (1,282 m)	46°39′53″N 120°06′49″W	
Horse Heaven Hills	Benton County, Washington	3,848 ft (1,173 m)	46°00′00″N 120°26′34″W	
Huckleberry Range	Stevens County, Washington	4,938 ft (1,505 m)	48°28′28″N 118°03′15″W	
Icicle Ridge	Chelan County, Washington	7,766 ft (2,367 m)	47°38′21″N 120°50′50.3″W	
Iron Mountains	Stevens County, Washington	4,632 ft (1,412 m)	48°23′17″N 117°46′37″W	
Issaquah Alps	King County, Washington	3,517 ft (1,072 m)	47°29′17″N 121°56′49″W	
Karakul Hills	Adams County, Washington	1,998 ft (609 m)	47°10′42″N 118°10′46″W	
Kettle River Range	Ferry County, Washington	7,116 ft (2,169 m)	48°50′00″N 118°25′04″W	
Kruger Mountain	Okanogan County, Washington	2,526 ft (770 m)	48°59′58″N 119°31′25″W	
Lance Hills	Spokane County, Washington	2,451 ft (747 m)	47°25′13″N 117°42′26″W	
Lead King Hills	Pend Oreille County, Washington	2,969 ft (905 m)	48°56′50″N 117°20′55″W	
Monte Cristo Range	Klickitat County, Washington	3,445 ft (1,050 m)	45°55′00″N 121°35′01″W	
Newcastle Hills	King County, Washington	1,106 ft (337 m)	47°31′27″N 122°08′24″W	
Olympic Mountains	Jefferson County, Washington	7,962 ft (2,427 m)	47°52′19″N 123°40′05″W	
Paradise Hills	Skamania County, Washington	3,714 ft (1,132 m)	45°58′40″N 121°59′31″W	
Picket Range	Whatcom County, Washington	7,848 ft (2,392 m)	48°48′58″N 121°19′52″W	
Porter Hills	Pierce County, Washington	328 ft (100 m)	47°08′15″N 122°30′48″W	
Pot Hills	Douglas County, Washington	2,228 ft (679 m)	47°48′55″N 119°27′19″W	
Quilcene Range	Jefferson County, Washington	3,238 ft (987 m)	47°49′49″N 122°57′33″W	
Rattlesnake Hills	Yakima County, Washington	2,188 ft (667 m)	46°31′19″N 120°20′05″W	
Saddle Mountains	Grant County, Washington	2,625 ft (800 m)	46°48′24″N 119°33′28″W	
Sand Hills	Adams County, Washington	1,450 ft (440 m)	46°46′50″N 118°31′36″W	
Sand Hills	Ferry County, Washington	1,824 ft (556 m)	47°54′56″N 118°31′12″W	
Selkirk Mountains	Boundary County, Idaho	5,331 ft (1,625 m)	48°30′01″N 116°45′05″W	
Sentinel Bluffs	Grant County, Washington	1,388 ft (423 m)	46°47′44″N 119°55′05″W	
Seven Sisters	Chelan County, Washington	7,185 ft (2,190 m)	48°22′38″N 120°56′01″W	
Simcoe Mountains	Klickitat County, Washington	3,760 ft (1,150 m)	45°59′06″N 120°43′23″W	
Skagit Range	Whatcom County, Washington	7,027 ft (2,142 m)	48°55′39″N 121°33′57″W	
Skyrocket Hills	Walla Walla County, Washington	2,064 ft (629 m)	46°21′10″N 118°17′54″W	
Sluiskin Mountains	Pierce County, Washington	6,818 ft (2,078 m)	46°56′44″N 121°44′19″W	
Sophys Meadows	Okanogan County, Washington	4,741 ft (1,445 m)	48°36′50″N 119°49′40″W	
South Twentymile Meadows	Okanogan County, Washington	5,699 ft (1,737 m)	48°43′45″N 119°57′05″W	
Stuart Range	Chelan County, Washington	8,067 ft (2,459 m)	47°28′13″N 120°47′06″W	
Tatoosh Range	Lewis County, Washington	6,063 ft (1,848 m)	46°45′25″N 121°43′11″W	
The Foothills	Clallam County, Washington	2,447 ft (746 m)	48°03′11″N 123°26′49″W	
The Summit Range	Stevens County, Washington	3,766 ft (1,148 m)	48°17′05″N 118°02′37″W	
Three Rocks	Spokane County, Washington	3,612 ft (1,101 m)	47°58′28″N 117°08′17″W	
Tiffany Meadows	Okanogan County, Washington	6,184 ft (1,885 m)	48°41′17″N 119°58′05″W	
Toutle Mountain Range	Cowlitz County, Washington	2,726 ft (831 m)	46°16′28″N 122°31′06″W	
Twin Mountains	Stevens County, Washington	3,258 ft (993 m)	47°54′06″N 117°37′21″W	
Twin Sisters Range	Whatcom County, Washington	5,548 ft (1,691 m)	48°42′39″N 121°59′36″W	
Wenatchee Mountains	Chelan County, Washington	5,958 ft (1,816 m)	47°25′30″N 120°49′58″W	
Westcott Hills	Pierce County, Washington	335 ft (102 m)	47°07′25″N 122°30′59″W	
White Mountains	Chelan County, Washington	6,722 ft (2,049 m)	48°00′40″N 120°55′22″W	
Wilkes Hills	Cowlitz County, Washington	551 ft (168 m)	46°23′31″N 122°48′23″W	
Willapa Hills	Pacific County, Washington	187 ft (57 m)	46°39′59″N 123°30′06″W	

== See also ==
- List of mountain ranges of Oregon
- Outline of the Cascade Range
