= Wood Lake, Minnesota =

City in Minnesota, United States

Wood Lake
- City
- Location of Wood Lake, Minnesota
- Coordinates: 44°39′05″N 95°32′09″W
- Country: United States
- State: Minnesota
- County: Yellow Medicine

Area
  - Total: 0.75 sq mi (1.95 km^{2})
  - Land: 0.75 sq mi (1.95 km^{2})
  - Water: 0 sq mi (0.00 km^{2})
- Elevation: 1,053 ft (321 m)

Population (2020)
  - Total: 381
  - Density: 505.5/sq mi (195.17/km^{2})
- Time zone: UTC-6 (Central (CST))
  - Summer (DST): UTC-5 (CDT)
- ZIP code: 56297
- Area code: 507
- FIPS code: 27-71446
- GNIS feature ID: 2397362
- Website: https://www.woodlakemn.com/

Wood Lake is a city in Yellow Medicine County, Minnesota, United States. The population was 381 at the 2020 census.

== History ==
Wood Lake was laid out in 1884, when the railroad was extended to that point. The town took its name from nearby Wood Lake. Wood Lake was incorporated in 1891.

== Geography ==
According to the United States Census Bureau, the city has a total area of 0.81 square miles (2.10 km^{2}), all land.

== Demographics ==
Historical population
Census	Pop.	Note	%±
1900	264		—
1910	292		10.6%
1920	447		53.1%
1930	391		−12.5%
1940	436		11.5%
1950	504		15.6%
1960	506		0.4%
1970	418		−17.4%
1980	420		0.5%
1990	406		−3.3%
2000	436		7.4%
2010	439		0.7%
2020	381		−13.2%
U.S. Decennial Census

=== 2010 census ===
As of the census of 2010, there were 439 people, 181 households, and 118 families living in the city. The population density was 542.0 inhabitants per square mile (209.3/km^{2}). There were 195 housing units at an average density of 240.7 per square mile (92.9/km^{2}). The racial makeup of the city was 92.5% White, 4.6% Native American, 1.6% from other races, and 1.4% from two or more races. Hispanic or Latino of any race were 7.5% of the population.

There were 181 households, of which 29.3% had children under the age of 18 living with them, 50.8% were married couples living together, 7.2% had a female householder with no husband present, 7.2% had a male householder with no wife present, and 34.8% were non-families. 26.0% of all households were made up of individuals, and 11.1% had someone living alone who was 65 years of age or older. The average household size was 2.43 and the average family size was 2.86.

The median age in the city was 38 years. 24.4% of residents were under the age of 18; 6.9% were between the ages of 18 and 24; 26.8% were from 25 to 44; 28.5% were from 45 to 64; and 13.4% were 65 years of age or older. The gender makeup of the city was 51.7% male and 48.3% female.

=== 2000 census ===
As of the census of 2000, there were 436 people, 182 households, and 119 families living in the city. The population density was 541.6 inhabitants per square mile (209.1/km^{2}). There were 190 housing units at an average density of 236.0 per square mile (91.1/km^{2}). The racial makeup of the city was 98.62% White, 1.15% Native American, and 0.23% from two or more races. Hispanic or Latino of any race were 0.23% of the population.

There were 182 households, out of which 30.8% had children under the age of 18 living with them, 58.8% were married couples living together, 4.9% had a female householder with no husband present, and 34.6% were non-families. 30.2% of all households were made up of individuals, and 15.4% had someone living alone who was 65 years of age or older. The average household size was 2.40 and the average family size was 2.97.

In the city, the population was spread out, with 25.7% under the age of 18, 8.9% from 18 to 24, 26.6% from 25 to 44, 19.7% from 45 to 64, and 19.0% who were 65 years of age or older. The median age was 39 years. For every 100 females, there were 98.2 males. For every 100 females age 18 and over, there were 96.4 males.

The median income for a household in the city was $38,203, and the median income for a family was $46,875. Males had a median income of $30,900 versus $20,789 for females. The per capita income for the city was $16,903. None of the families and 3.9% of the population were living below the poverty line, including no under eighteens and 4.8% of those over 64.

== Notable people ==
- Marvin W. Bursch, state legislator and businessman; born in Wood Lake
