= Walter Roth (politician) =

American farmer and politician

Walter Roth (September 20, 1893 – March 18, 1973) was an American farmer and politician.

Roth was born in Alexandria, Douglas County, Minnesota and lived in Alexandria with his wife and family. Roth was a farmer. He served on the Lake Mary Township Board of Supervisors. Roth served on the Douglas County Fair Board. He also served on the Alexandria City Council and the Alexandria School Board. Roth served in the Minnesota House of Representatives in 1939 and 1940. He died in an automobile accident in Bradenton, Florida.
