= Frederick J. Foslien =

American politician (1895–1987)

Frederick Joseph Foslien (July 25, 1895 – June 6, 1987) was an American businessman, farmer, and politician.

Foslien was born in Moe Township, Douglas County, Minnesota. He served in the United States Army during World War I. Foslien lived in Garfield, Minnesota with his wife and family. He was involved with, farming, cattle livestock shipping, and the farmers elevator business. Foslien served on the Garfield Village Council and also served as Mayor of Garfield, Minnesota. He then moved to Alexandria, Minnesota with his wife and family and then served as secretary-treasurer of the Alexandria Production Credit Association. Foslien served in the Minnesota House of Representatives in 1933 and 1934 and in the Minnesota Senate from 1935 to 1938. He died at the Knute Nelson Home in Alexandria, Minnesota.
