= Lake Agnes (Minnesota) =

There are four lakes in the U.S. state of Minnesota named Lake Agnes:

- Lake Agnes (Cook County, Minnesota)
- Lake Agnes (Douglas County, Minnesota)
- Lake Agnes (Boundary Waters)
- Lake Agnes (Voyageurs National Park)
