= Theodore G. Winkjer =

American politician (1891–1978)

Theodore G. Winkjer (January 28, 1891 – December 18, 1978) was an American farmer, businessman, and politician.

Winkjer was born in Moe Township, Douglas County, Minnesota. He graduated from the University of Minnesota School of Agriculture. Winkjer lived with his wife and family on the Winkjer Family Farm in Garfield, Minnesota. He served in the Minnesota Senate from 1939 to 1942. Winkjer retired from farming, in 1943, and then was involved in the insurance business. He then moved to Alexandria, Minnesota with his wife and family. Winkjer died in Alexandria, Minnesota.
