= Hill H. Wilson =

Irish-born American businessman and politician

Hill H. Wilson (November 1, 1840 – May 23, 1896) was an American businessman and politician.

Wilson was born in Ireland and was brought to the United States when he was twelve, in 1852, to live with his family in Ogdensburg, New York. Wilson went to school and then learned to be a miller. He served in the 16th New York Infantry Regiment during the American Civil War and was commissioned a sergeant.

In 1875, Wilson moved to Alexandria, Douglas County, Minnesota, with his wife and family. He operated a mill and was a cattle farmer. Wilson served on the Douglas County Commission and also served as mayor of Alexandria, Minnesota. Wilson served in the Minnesota House of Representatives from 1887 to 1890 and was a Republican and an Independent.

Wilson died at his home in Alexandria, Minnesota after suffering a stroke. He was buried in Alexandria, Minnesota.
