= Marvin W. Bursch =

American politician (1913–2000)

- Portrait of Bursch in the 1969 Minnesota Legislative Manual

Member of the Minnesota Senate from the 54th district
- In office January 2, 1967 – January 3, 1971
- Preceded by: William C.F. Heuer (redistricted)
- Succeeded by: Myrton O. Wegener

Personal details
- Born: April 10, 1913 Wood Lake, Minnesota, U.S.
- Died: May 1, 2000 (aged 87) Alexandria, Minnesota, U.S.
- Party: Republican
- Spouse: Audrey Johnson (died 1999)
- Children: 4
- Education: St. Olaf College (attended)
- Occupation: Travel agent; businessman

Military service
- Allegiance: United States
- Branch/service: United States Army
- Battles/wars: World War II

Marvin W. "Pete" Bursch (April 10, 1913 – May 1, 2000) was an American businessman and politician. A native of Alexandria, Minnesota, Bursch founded and operated a travel agency in that city. He served in the Minnesota Senate from 1967 to 1971 representing the 54th district, which included Douglas, Todd, and Wadena counties.

== Early life ==
Marvin W. Bursch was born on April 10, 1913, in Wood Lake, Minnesota. (Note: Bursch's obituary in the Star Tribune listed Alexandria, Minnesota, as his place of birth. This article uses the birthdate and place used in his biography in the Minnesota Legislative Manual and in his profile in the Minnesota Legislative Reference Library database.) During the Great Depression, Bursch left his home and worked various jobs in Minnesota and the Dakotas. The Brainerd Dispatch reported that Bursch worked at the Montgomery Ward store in Brainerd, Minnesota, from 1937 until October 1938, when he left for another Montgomery Ward store in Fergus Falls, Minnesota. By February 1939, he became the clothing department head at that store. He joined the United States Army during World War II. His profile in the Minnesota Legislative Manual also indicated that he attended St. Olaf College in Northfield, Minnesota, but does not dictate if he graduated, nor does it specify his field of study.

== Career ==
=== Business ventures ===
Bursch bought a restaurant in Alexandria, Minnesota, in 1956. The restaurant also served as a depot for Greyhound Lines. The selling of bus tickets led to the creation of Bursch Travel Agency. In 1963, Bursch Travel, Inc., was incorporated as a corporation. Bursch was listed as both an incorporator and as a member of the board of directors.

=== State legislature ===
Following the reapportionment prior to the 1966 state legislative elections, Bursch's native Douglas County fell into the 54th district with Todd and Wadena counties, represented by William C.F. Heuer. Alexandria's senator, Clifford Lofvegren, instead opted to run for the district 54A seat in the Minnesota House of Representatives, which led Bursch to file for the senate race against Heuer in July 1966. In the November 8, 1966, election, Bursch received 12,212 votes to Heuer's 8,902 to secure the senate seat. The state legislature at this time was officially nonpartisan, meaning that Bursch did not belong to a party during his tenure. He was a member of the conservative caucus.

During his first and only term in office, Bursch was a member of the standing committees on agriculture, education, game and fish, general legislation, and public domain. In March 1967, Bursch joined in opposition to a bill which would require the study of the Minnesota Constitution in public schools. Bursch opposed on the grounds that the state legislature should not recommend curriculum. In May 1967, Bursch co-authored legislation that allowed people older than 70 to obtain free fishing licenses. The measure was passed by the legislature. In September 1968, Bursch opposed the dumping of sewage in the Long Prairie River following a Minnesota Water Pollution Control Agency recommendation to divert city and industrial waste to the river. In February 1969, Bursch proposed the creation of a hiking trail from Sibley State Park to Lake Carlos State Park called the "Alexander Moraine Trail." In the two sessions in which Bursch served, he was the principal author of 47 bills and a co-author of 83 bills. In all, 53 bills in which he authored or co-authored became law.

Bursch filed for re-election in July 1970. Later that month, Myrton O. Wegener, mayor of Bertha, Minnesota, announced he would run against Bursch for the seat. In a closely contested election on November 3, 1970, Bursch lost re-election. Wegener received 11,999 votes to Bursch's 11,177.

== Later life and death ==
Bursch retired from the travel business around 1980. He died in Alexandria on May 1, 2000, from complications of Parkinson's disease. At the time of his death, Bursch Travel Agency had 15 offices in Minnesota and the Dakotas.

== Personal life ==
Bursch held a board position in the Alexandria school board and served as a board member for Theatre L'homme Dieu for 30 years. He was also a member of Kiwanis and the American Legion. Though officially nonpartisan during his tenure as a legislator, Bursch was affiliated with the Republican Party of Minnesota.

Bursch was married with four children: Barbara, Fred, Charles, and Mary. His wife, Audrey, died in 1999.

== Notes ==
Minnesota Senate
Preceded by William C.F. Heuer	Member of the Minnesota Senate from the 54th district January 2, 1967 – January 3, 1971	Succeeded by Myrton O. Wegener
