= Lake Sylvester (Alpine Lakes Wilderness) =

Lake in Washington, United States

- Location within Washington (state) Location within the United States
- Location: Kittitas County, Washington, United States
- Coordinates: 47.6340416°N 120.9247133°W
- Primary outflows: Grindstone Creek
- Basin countries: United States
- Surface area: 25 acres (0.10 km^{2})
- Surface elevation: 6,260 ft (1,910 m)

Lake Sylvester is a freshwater lake located on the north slope of the Grindstone Mountain, in Chelan County, Washington. The lake is a popular area for hiking, swimming, and fishing. Lake Sylvester is located approximately 15 miles west of the city of Leavenworth and access is obtained by Chatter Creek Trail #1580. Self-issued Alpine Lake Wilderness permit required for transit within the Grindstone Mountain area.

== History ==
Lake Sylvester was given its name by Albert Hale Sylvester, a topographer for the United States Geological Survey working throughout the North Cascades National Park Complex around 1900, who named it after himself being a neighbor lake of Lake Alice, named after his wife. Lake Sylvester is just south of Lake Alice.

== Access ==
The foot trail starts at the Chatter Creek Trailhead at the end of USFS Road 7609 on the north shore of Icicle Creek. Chatter Creek Trail #1580 is approximately 5.5 miles long and travels fairly closely to the course of Chatter Creek. The trail leads past Lake Sylvester and Lake Alice reaching and joining Icicle Ridge Trail #1580 on the north skirt of Grindstone mountain. Lake Sylvester is on the West side of the trail over a ridge forming a cirque for the lake. Lake Alice is further north also on the west side of the trail over a ridge shortly before the trail takes a turn East to join Icicle Ridge Trail.

Campsites are located along the first few miles of the trail until the trail becomes more forested around the bowls formed for Lakes Sylvester and Alice. Self-issued Alpine Lake Wilderness permit required for transit within the Sylvester Lake area and can be obtained at the Chatter Creek Trailhead and the Campground past the Guard station.

Continuing left on Icicle Ridge Trail leads to additional Ladies Lakes, including Upper Florence Lake right after the trail takes a turn left. Lower Florence Lake is further down the slope past Upper Florence lake. To the right (East) of Icicle Ridge Trail is Lake Ida and Lake Augusta.

== See also ==
- List of lakes of the Alpine Lakes Wilderness
