= Runestone Museum =

Museum in Alexandria, Minnesota

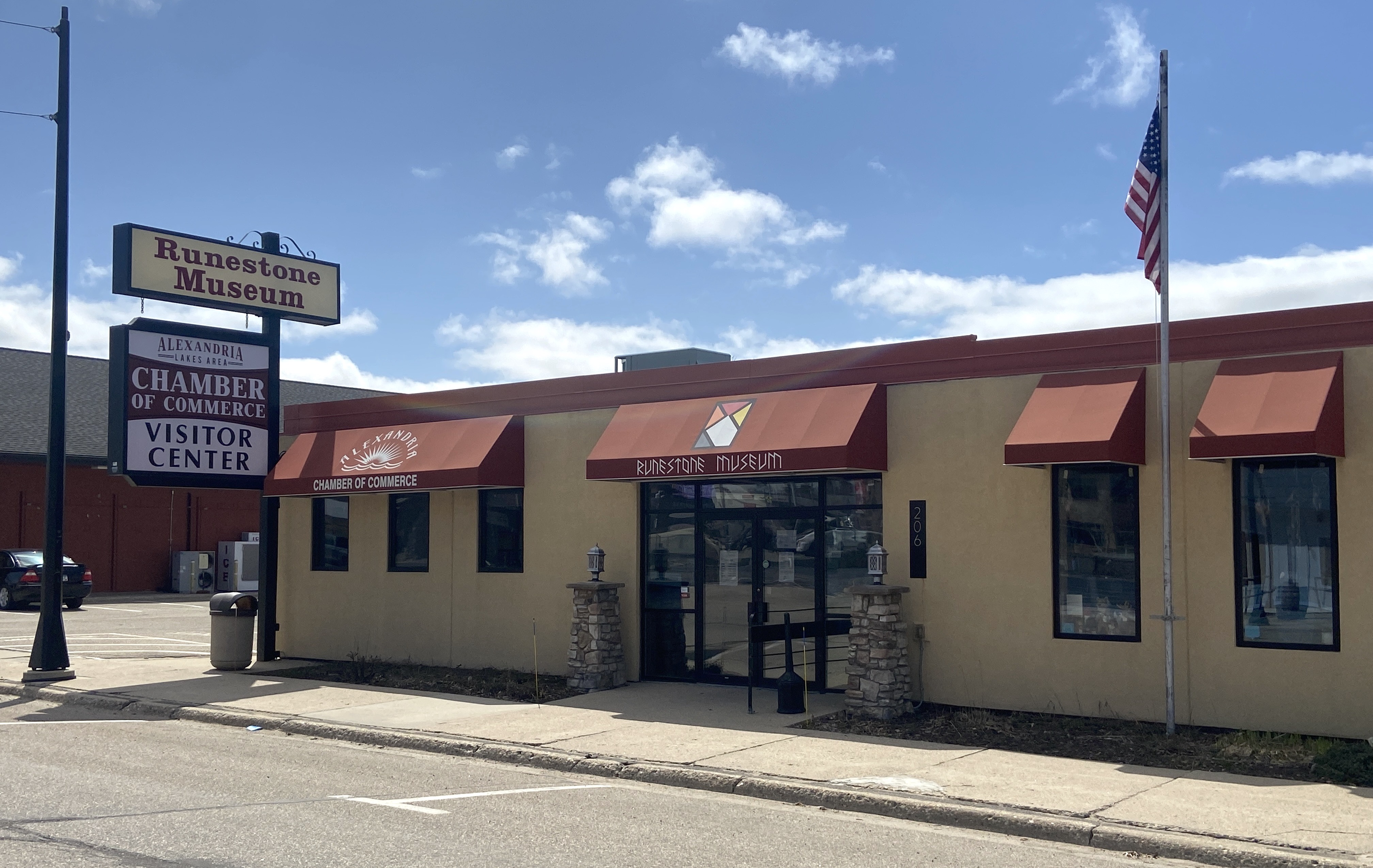
- Building in 2022
- Established: 1958
- Location: 206 Broadway Street, Alexandria, Minnesota, United States
- Coordinates: 45°53′25″N 95°22′41″W
- Type: Local History
- Executive director: Amanda Seim
- Website: runestonemuseum.org

The Runestone Museum is a historical museum located in Alexandria, Minnesota, United States. Established in 1958, the museum is renowned for housing the Kensington Runestone, a controversial artifact considered by some to be evidence of pre-Columbian Viking exploration of North America.

== Focus and Exhibits ==
While the Kensington Runestone is the museum's centerpiece, the Runestone Museum offers a broader perspective on regional history. Visitors can explore exhibits on the following:

- Norse history and culture: Learn about the Vikings, their exploration patterns, and their impact on the region.
- Native American history: Discover the rich heritage of the First Minnesotans, the indigenous population of the area.
- Early European settlers: Explore the lives of the first European settlers in the area and the challenges they faced.
- Minnesota's homesteading era: Gain insight into the experiences of homesteaders who shaped the state's development.
- Minnesota wildlife: Encounter a variety of exhibits showcasing the diverse wildlife of Minnesota.

Other highlights include:

- The museum features a Children's Discovery Room with interactive exhibits.
- Fort Alexandria: A replica fort showcasing authentic log buildings from the 1860s-1910s.
- Snorri: A 40-foot Viking ship replica, offering a photo opportunity and a glimpse into Viking seafaring.

== Kensington Runestone ==
The Kensington Runestone remains a subject of debate. While some believe it is a genuine Viking artifact, others view it with skepticism. There has been a drawn-out debate regarding the stone's authenticity, but since the first scientific examination in 1910, the scholarly consensus has classified it as a 19th-century hoax. Regardless, the Runestone Museum plays a role in preserving regional history and sparking conversations about exploration, cultural exchange, and the interpretation of the past.

== Gallery ==
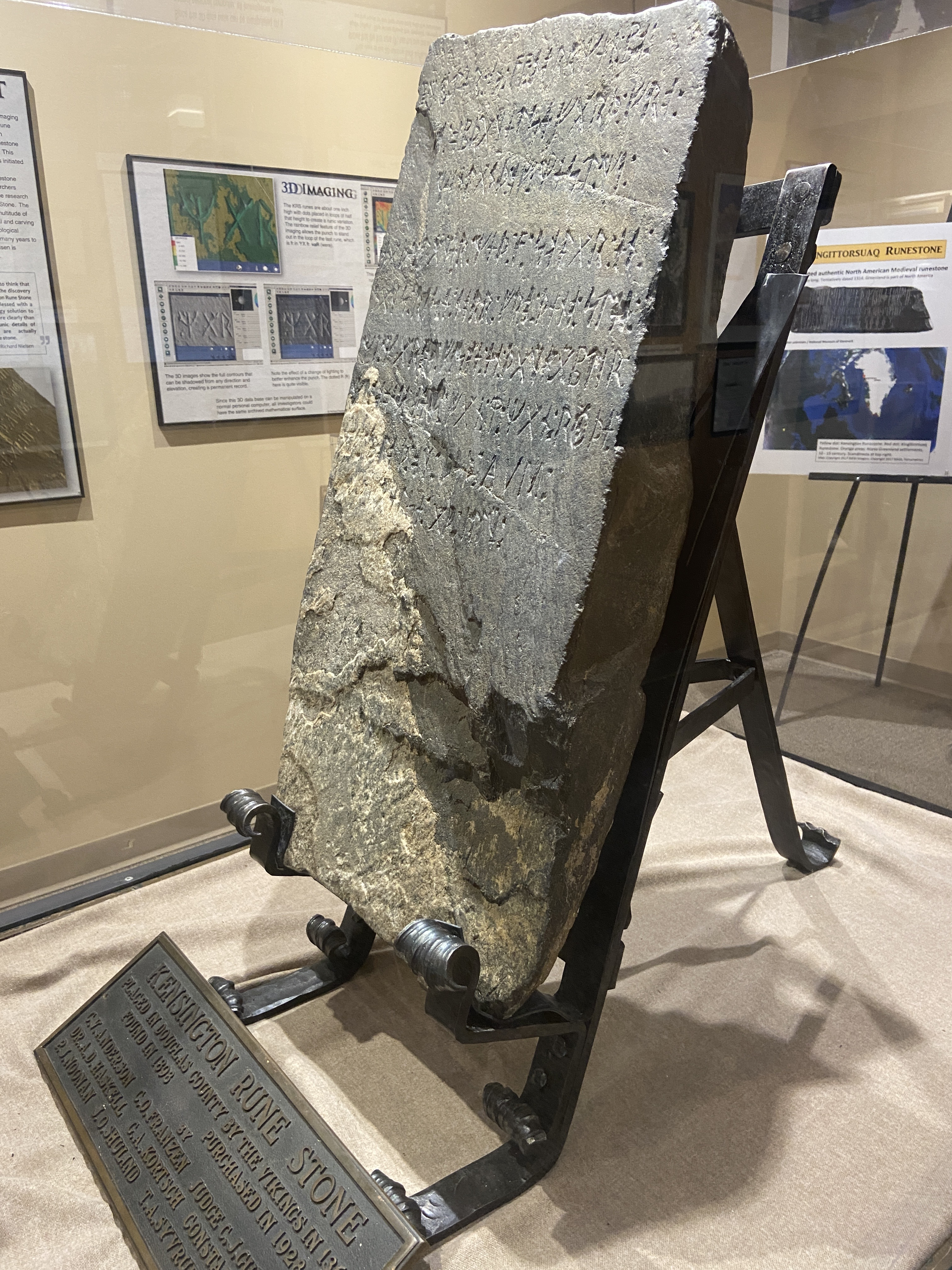
Kensington Runestone

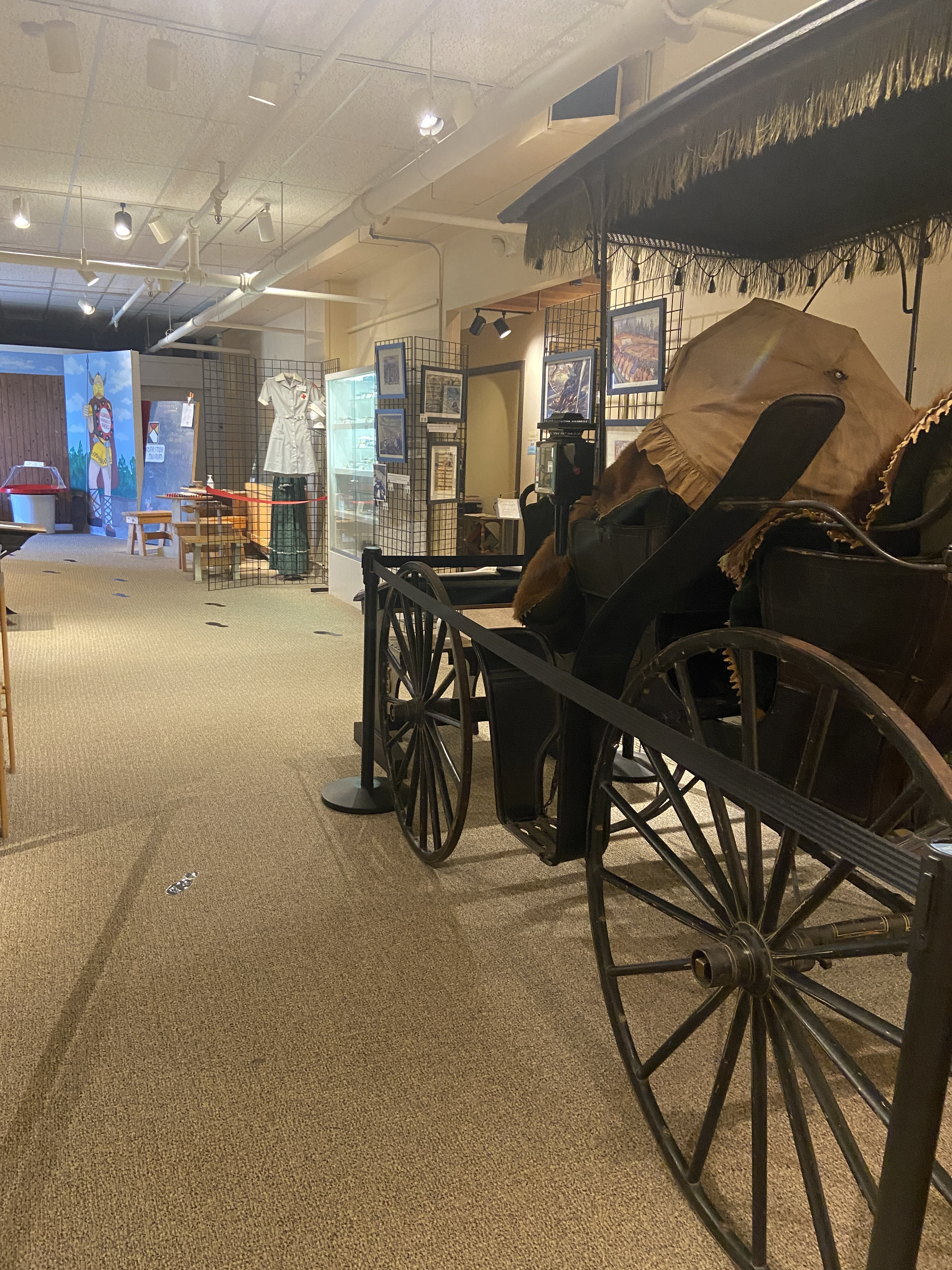
Museum exhibit

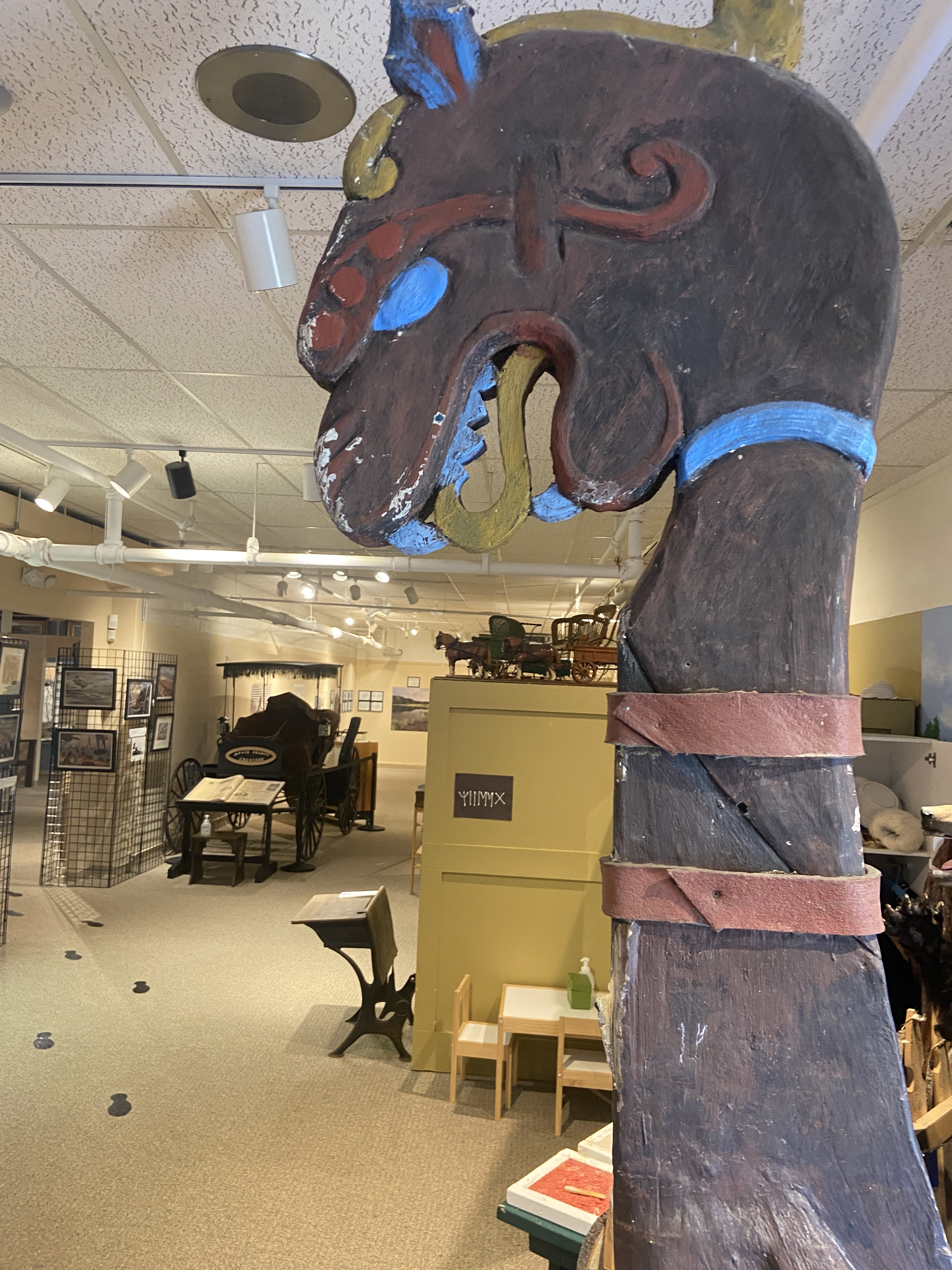
Museum exhibit

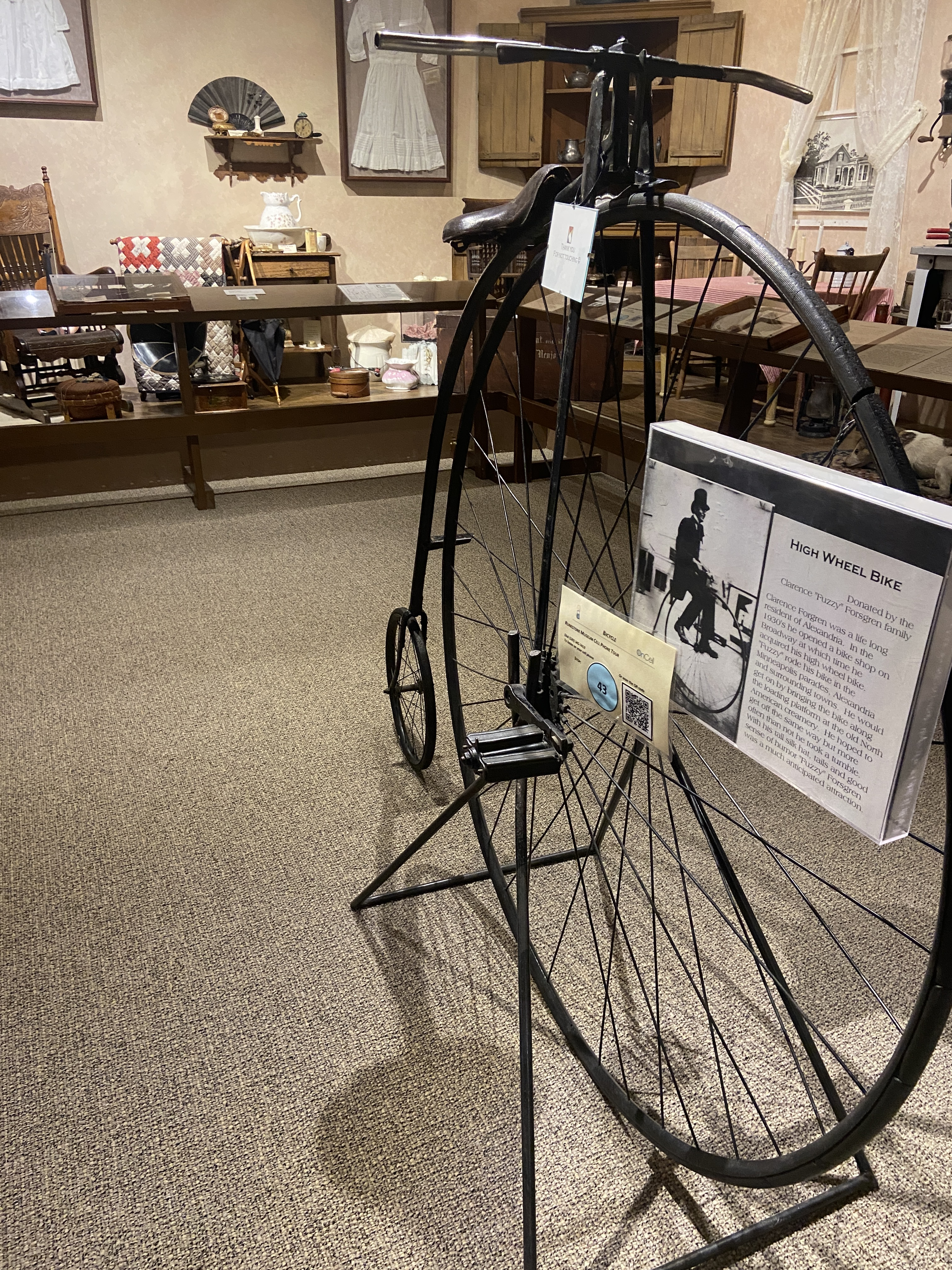
Museum exhibit

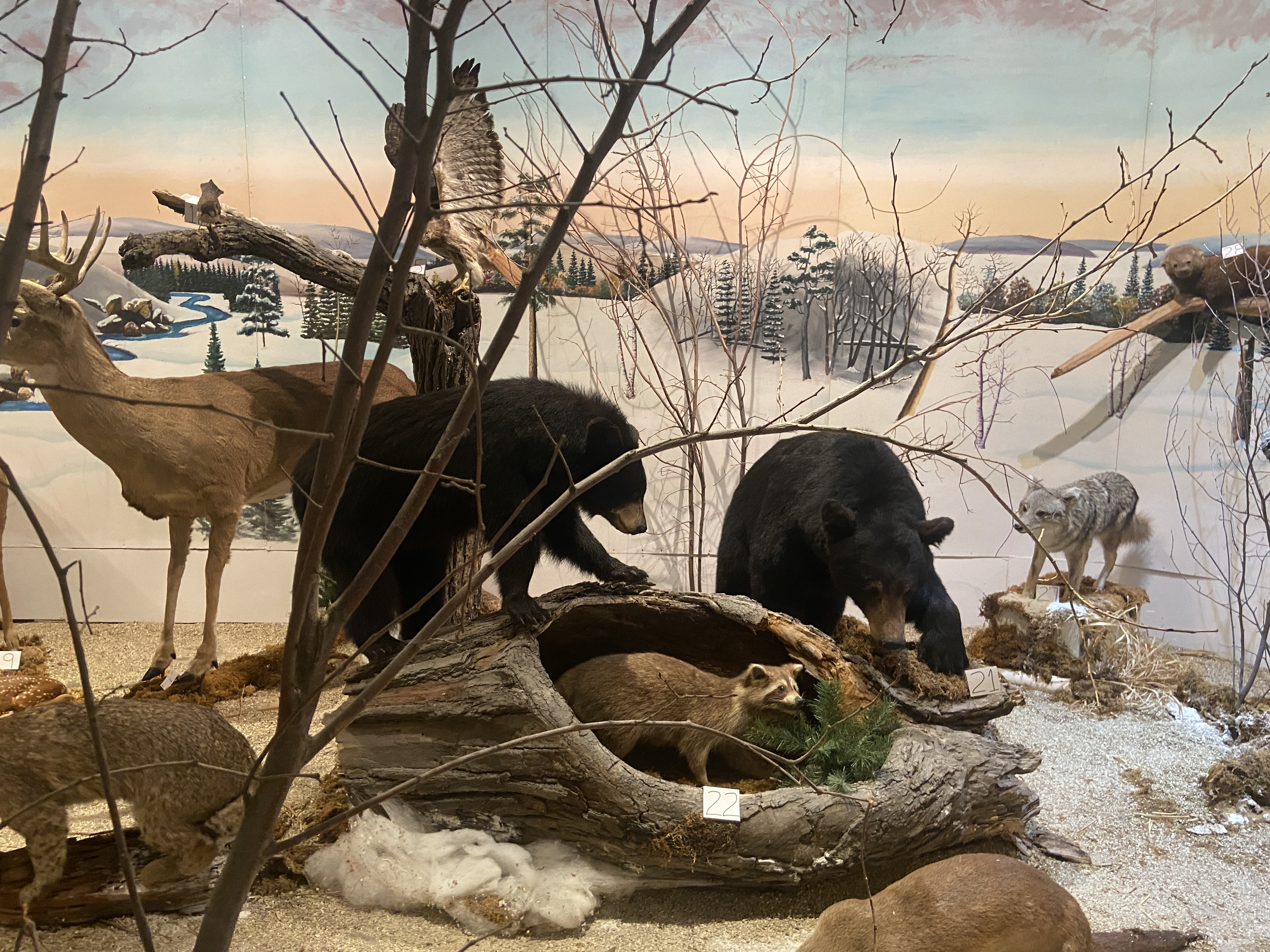
Wildlife diorama

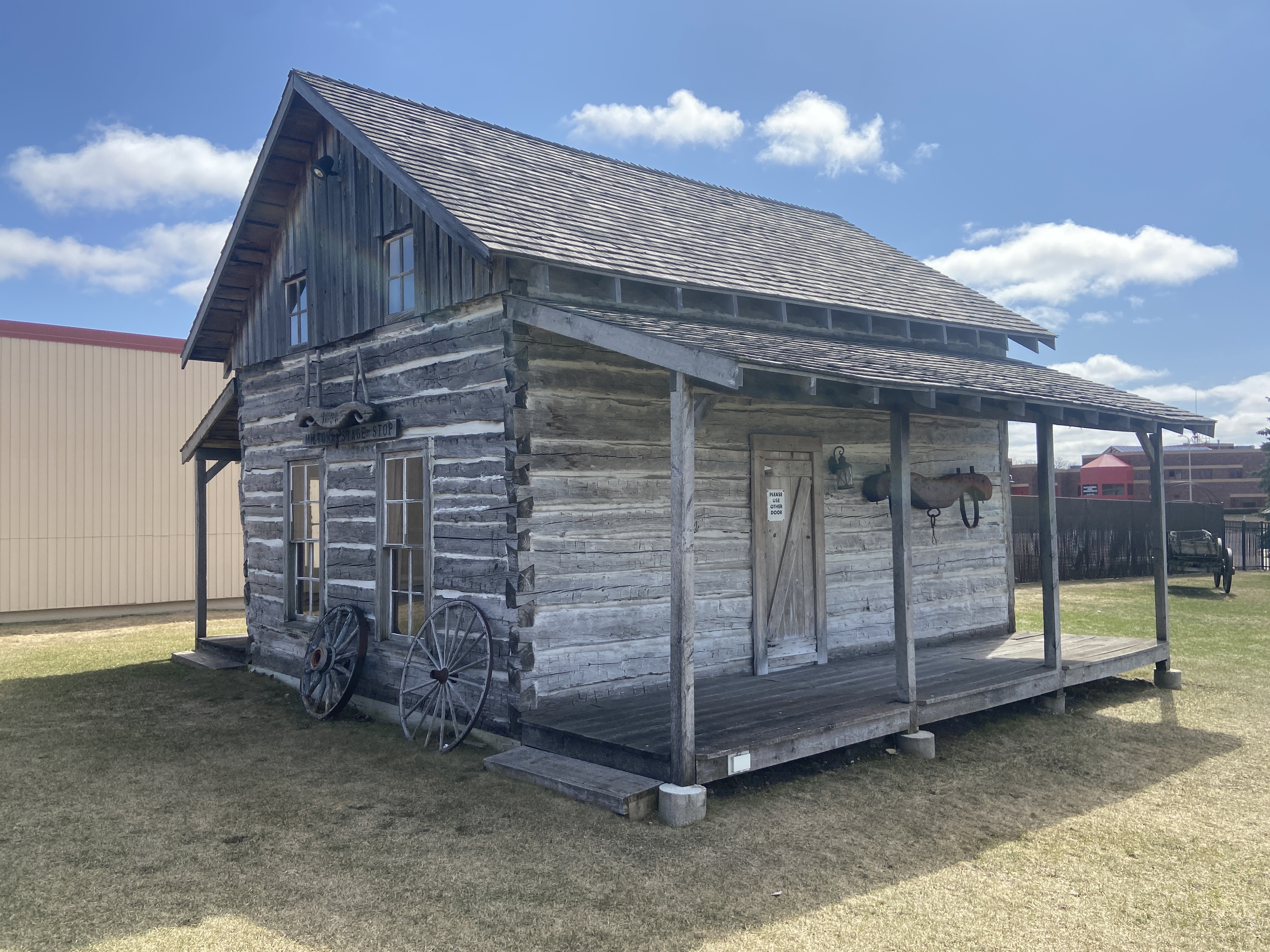
Stage Stop-front, Fort Alexandria

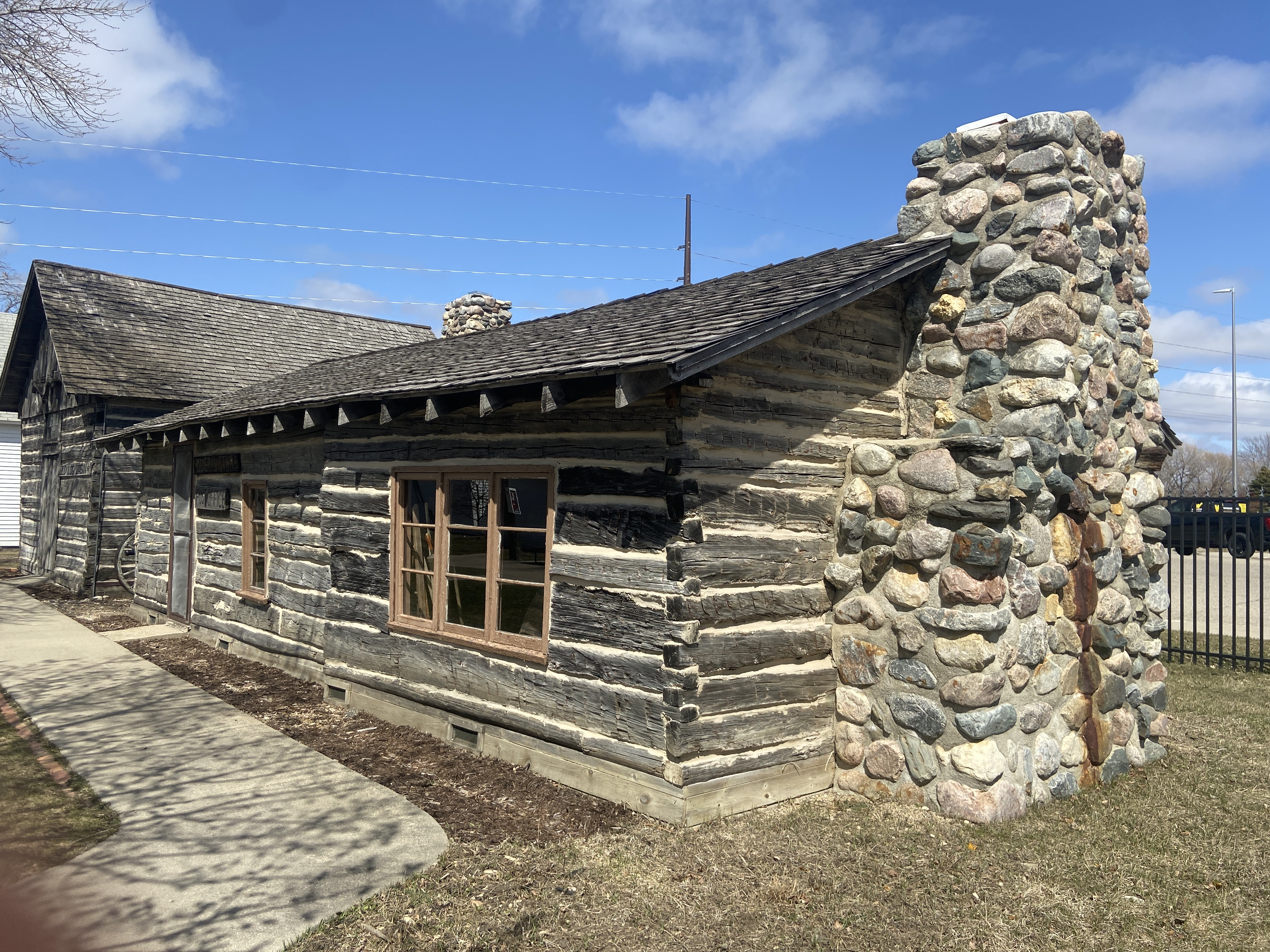
General Store and Post Office-Fort Alexandria.

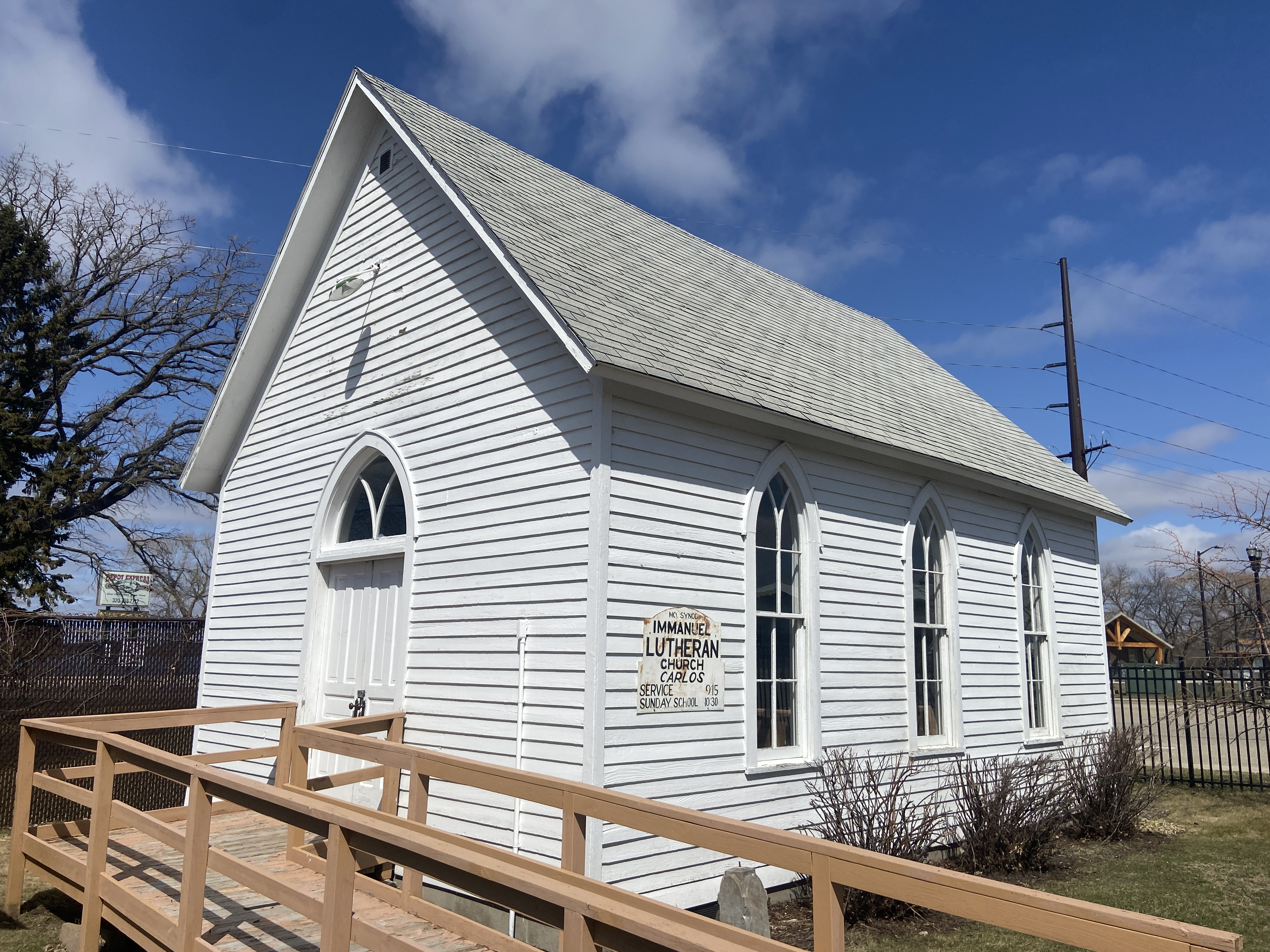
Immanuel Lutheran Church, Fort Alexandria
