= Vikingland Band Festival =

Coordinates: 45°53′9″N 95°22′40″W

The Vikingland Band Festival parade marching championship is held annually in Alexandria, MN.

The Vikingland Band Festival parade marching championship is held annually in Alexandria, Minnesota on the last Sunday of June. The event was founded in 1985. It is often regarded as the unofficial state championship for parade marching in Minnesota.

The parade features only marching bands. It does not include floats or other units commonly associated with parades. Bands march at a three-block interval to prevent their music from blending together. Alexandria's extra-wide main street provides a venue for the performances.

A panel of six judges provides recorded feedback and scores for each band. Placement awards are presented to every band, with the top band in each class earning the distinction of Class Champion. The highest- scoring band of the day overall is named the Grand Champion. Each champion band is awarded a traveling flag to carry for one year. Caption awards are presented for the top wind section, percussion section and color guard in each class.

One band is named the "People's Choice" by a panel of non-professional judges.

== Participants ==
The Vikingland Band Festival has drawn 95 different bands since its inception in 1985. Participants have come from seven different states (Minnesota, Wisconsin, Iowa, Colorado, South Carolina, South Dakota, Michigan), three Canadian provinces (Alberta, Manitoba, Saskatchewan), and Norway (five times).

Although many of the performing bands are experienced competitors, the festival also welcomes younger bands. Organizers believe the education, intensity, and sportsmanship of the competition can provide a valuable experience for any band.

The tradition of including non-competing "honor bands" in the parade was started in 1989 as a way to showcase a variety of marching styles. Styles represented have included foreign bands, military bands, bagpipes, drum and bugle corps, and percussion lines.

== History ==
Eight different bands have earned the title of Grand Champion:

Long Prairie (1985)

Henry Sibley High School (1986, 2018, 2019)

Litchfield (1987, 1988, 1989, 1990, 1998)

Irondale High School (1991, 1992, 1993, 1994, 1995, 1996)

Park Center High School (1997, 1999, 2001, 2003, 2007, 2008, 2011, 2012)

Mankato 77 Lancers (2000, 2002, 2010)

Waconia Marching Band (2004, 2005, 2006, 2009, 2016, 2022, 2025)

728 Cadets (2013, 2014, 2015, 2017, 2023, 2024, 2026)

No awards were presented during the COVID-19 pandemic in 2020 (online video format) or in 2021 (live event with a ratings-only format and no awards ceremony). Competition resumed in 2022.

In 1989 the festival began presenting traveling flags to the Grand Champion and Class Champion bands. A band can retire a flag in its honor by winning the title three consecutive years. Three bands have retired Grand Champion flags: Irondale (1993, 1996), Waconia (2006), and 728 Cadets (2015). Twelve bands have retired Class Champion flags: Bertha-Hewitt (1991, 1997), Dassel-Cokato (2019), Irondale (1993, 1996), Kerkhoven-Murdock-Sunburg (2011, 2014, 2017, 2022), Litchfield (1991, 1994, 1997, 2000), Long Prairie (1995, 1998), Milaca (2024), Park Center (1999, 2007), Sauk Rapids-Rice (2009), Waconia (2005, 2008, 2015), Winona Cotter (1994, 2006), and 728 Cadets (2015, 2023).
