= Upper Florence Lake =

Lake in Washington, United States

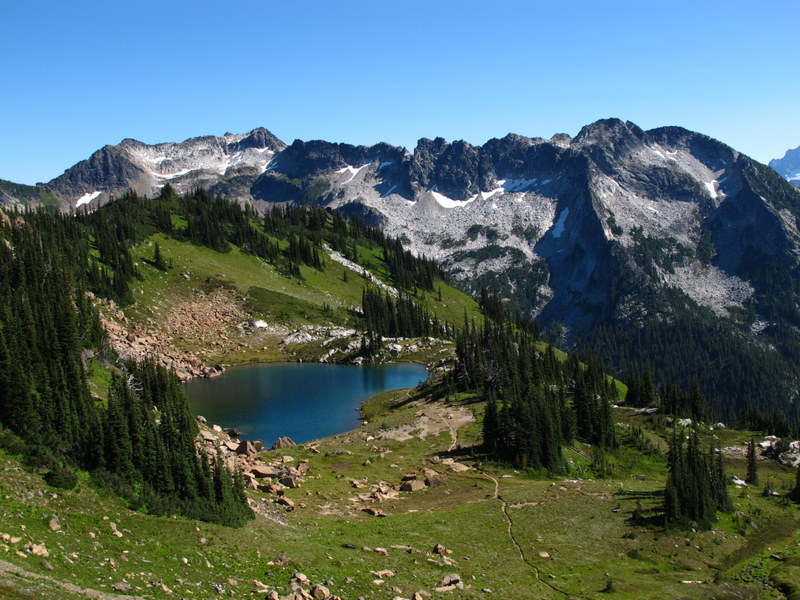
- Upper Florence Lake and Grindstone Mountain

- Location within Washington (state) Location within the United States
- Location: Chelan County, Washington, United States
- Coordinates: 47.6570413°N 120.9352396°W
- Primary outflows: Unnamed
- Basin countries: United States
- Surface area: 6 acres (0.024 km^{2})
- Surface elevation: 6,509 ft (1,984 m)

Upper Florence Lake is a freshwater lake located on the west skirt of Ladies Peak and Cape Horn, and North of Grindstone Mountain, in Chelan County, Washington. The lake is a popular area for hiking, swimming, and fishing, especially for rainbow trout. Lower Florence Lake is located further down the slope of Mary Pass from Upper Florence Lake, approximately 15 miles west of the city of Leavenworth. Self-issued Alpine Lake Wilderness permit required for transit within the Lake Alice area.

Along with neighboring lakes, Lake Florence was given its name by Albert Hale Sylvester, a topographer for the United States Geological Survey working throughout the North Cascades National Park Complex around 1900.

== Access ==
The foot trail starts at the Chatter Creek Trailhead at the end of USFS Road 7609 on the north shore of Icicle Creek. Chatter Creek Trail #1580 is approximately 5.5 miles long and travels fairly closely to the course of Chatter Creek. The trail leads past Lake Sylvester and Lake Alice reaching and joining Icicle Ridge Trail #1580 on the north skirt of Grindstone mountain. Access to Upper Florence Lake is off Icicle Ridge Trail, left out of Chatter Creek Trail. Icicle Ridge Trail shortly afterwards will bend left straight towards Upper Florence Lake over Mary ridge approximately 3/4 mile down the slope. Lower Florence Lake is further down the skirt of the ridge.

Campsites are located along the first few miles of Chatter Creek Trail until the trail becomes more forested around the bowls formed for Lakes Sylvester and Alice. Self-issued Alpine Lake Wilderness permit required for transit within the Sylvester Lake area and can be obtained at the Chatter Creek Trailhead and the Campground past the Guard station.

Access to Icicle Ridge Trail can also be gained by Fourth of July Trail #1579 and from the Icicle Ridge Trailhead off Icicle Road in the city of Leavenworth.

== See also ==
- List of lakes of the Alpine Lakes Wilderness
