= Julian O. Newhouse =

American politician (1915–2006)

Julian Orville Newhouse (July 5, 1915 – February 4, 2006) was an American businessman and politician.

Newhouse was born in Brandon, Douglas County, Minnesota. He moved to Alexandria, Minnesota with his family and graduated from Alexandria High School in 1934. He was involved with his family's business: Newhouse Implement. Newhouse served in the Minnesota National Guard during World War II and the Korean War and was commissioned a lieutenant colonel. He served in the Minnesota House of Representatives from 1957 to 1962. He died at the Minnesota Veterans' House in Fergus Falls, Minnesota with the funeral and burial in Alexandria, Minnesota.
