= Walter H. Campbell =

American businessman, lawyer, and politician

Walter H. Campbell (October 2, 1876 – February 10, 1944) was an American businessman, lawyer, and politician.

Campbell was born in Detroit, Michigan. He moved to Alexandria, Douglas County, Minnesota with his family in 1879. He graduated from Alexandria Area High School in 1891. Campbell graduated from University of Minnesota in 1895 and from University of Minnesota Law School in 1896. He lived in Minneapolis, Minnesota, with his wife and family and practiced law and was involved with the mortgage loans business. Campbell served in the Minnesota House of Representatives from 1927 to 1936 and from 1939 until his death in 1944. He died while still in office.
