= Clifford Lofvegren =

American politician (1903–1969)

Clifford Lofvegren (May 10, 1903 – April 22, 1969) was an American farmer and politician.

Lofvegren was born in Little Cedar, Mitchell County, Iowa. He grew up in Iowa and then moved to Alexandria, Minnesota in 1913 with his family. He went to the Alexandria Public Schools. Lofvegren lived in Alexandria, Minnesota with his wife and family. He was a farmer and was the owner of a cafe. Lofvegren served in the Minnesota Senate from 1949 to 1966. He died at his home in Alexandria, Minnesota.
