= Lake Augusta (Washington) =

Lake in Washington, United States

- Location within Washington (state) Location within the United States
- Location: Chelan County, Washington, United States
- Coordinates: 47.6534830°N 120.8354165°W
- Primary outflows: Cabin Creek
- Basin countries: United States
- Surface area: 15.3 acres (0.062 km^{2})
- Surface elevation: 6,857 ft (2,090 m)

Lake Augusta is a freshwater lake located on the southwest skirt of Big Jim Mountain, East of Icicle Ridge, in Chelan County, Washington. Because of its close proximity to Icicle Ridge Trail, the lake is a popular area for hiking, swimming, and fishing cutthroat trout. Smaller Lake Ida is a short distance on the opposite side of Icicle Ridge and Big Jim Mountain Lakes or on the northeast slope of the mountain. Lake Augusta is located approximately 15 miles west of the city of Leavenworth. Self-issued Alpine Lake Wilderness permit required for transit within the Lake Augusta area.

Along with neighboring lakes, Lake Augusta was given its name by Albert Hale Sylvester, a topographer for the United States Geological Survey working throughout the North Cascades National Park Complex in the 1900s.

== Geography ==
Lake Augusta sits on the south skirt of Big Jim Mountain, consisting of rocky soils of intrusive rock geology. The bedrock is about 3 feet from the surface and mapped as quartz-dolerite and exposed rock that tends to be granodiorite with influence from the intrusions originated from the Mount Stuart Batholith which underlies the Stuart Range and the nearby Wenatchee Mountains. This batholith is about 13 by 16 miles in extent. Two plutonic masses are separated by a thin screen of Chiwaukum Schist and rocks of the Ingalls Complex. The more-eastern pluton is 93 million years old, while the more-western rock mass is between 83 and 86 million years old.

The trail to the lake consists of sandy loam the first half and boulders added in the second half of the trajectory. The west hills of Big Jim Mountain surrounding Lake Augusta grow tonalite and granodiorite corona-bearing dikes. The East hill grew pyroxenites, gabbro amphibolites and other diorites. Mineral boundaries are sharp along Big Jim Mountain except between these two matrix subdomains, which are not immediately distinguishable.

Coronas found in dikes along Lake Augusta show evidence of strain, deformed into elongate ellipsoids with long axes that lie parallel to the dike boundaries. Coarse phenocrysts of igneous feldspar with a high calcium content are locally preserved in Lake Augusta.

== Climate ==
Lake Augusta has a hemiboreal climate. The average temperature is 9 °C. The warmest month is August, with an average temperature of 20 °C, and the coldest month is January, at an average of −6 °C. The average rainfall is 828 millimeters per year. The wettest month is January, with 233 millimeters of rain, and the least in July, with 28 millimeters of rain.

Lake Augusta

Climate chart (precipitation, max. and min. temperature)
J	F	M	A	M	J	J	A	S	O	N	D
233 1 −9	173 2 −8	191 6 −6	108 11 −2	102 17 2	66 21 5	28 27 9	34 27 9	66 21 6	161 13 0	193 5 −5	210 1 −9
- █ Average max. and min. temperatures in °C
- █ Precipitation totals in mm
Imperial conversion
J	F	M	A	M	J	J	A	S	O	N	D
9.2 34 16	6.8 36 18	7.5 43 21	4.3 52 28	4 63 36	2.6 70 41	1.1 81 48	1.3 81 48	2.6 70 43	6.3 55 32	7.6 41 23	8.3 34 16
- █ Average max. and min. temperatures in °F
- █ Precipitation totals in inches

== Access ==
The foot trail starts at the Chatter Creek Trailhead at the end of USFS Road 7609 on the north bank of Icicle Creek. Chatter Creek Trail #1580 is approximately 5.5 miles long and travels fairly closely to the course of Chatter Creek. The trail leads past Lake Sylvester and Lake Alice reaching and joining Icicle Ridge Trail #1580 on the north skirt of Grindstone mountain. Access to Lake Augusta is off Icicle Ridge Trail to the right (east) of its junction with Chatter Creek Trail. Icicle Ridge Trail shortly afterwards will follow the ridge to Lake Ida on the right and Lake Augusta over the east slope of Big Jim Mountain.

Campsites are located along the first few miles of Chatter Creek Trail until the trail becomes more forested around the bowls formed for Lakes Sylvester and Alice. Several campsite are also located around the shore of Lake Augusta. Self-issued Alpine Lake Wilderness permit required for transit within the Grindstone Mountain area and can be obtained at the Chatter Creek Trailhead and the Campground past the Guard station.

=== Alternate routes ===
Access to Icicle Ridge Trail can also be gained a further distance away by Fourth of July Trail #1579 and from the Icicle Ridge Trailhead off Icicle Road in the city of Leavenworth. Icicle Ridge is also intersected by Hatchery Creek Trail #1577 a short distance from Lake Augusta coming from the north. The Hatchery Creek Trailhead is approximately 6 miles from the Icicle Ridge Junction and is located West of Tumwater Campground as Highway 2 crosses over Wenatchee River, south of Chiwaukum, Washington. A good part of the Hatchery Creek Trail is overgrown by fireweed and charred logs remnants of the Hatchery Fire of 1994.

== See also ==
- List of lakes of the Alpine Lakes Wilderness
