= Florence Lake School No. 3 =

- U.S. National Register of Historic Places
- Location within North Dakota Location within the United States
- Nearest city: Wing, North Dakota
- Coordinates: 47°16′20″N 100°17′1″W
- Built: 1917, 1937 Wing vicinity
- NRHP reference No.: 11000786
- Added to NRHP: November 1, 2011

Florence Lake School No. 3 was listed on the National Register of Historic Places in 2011. It is located approximately 10 miles north of Wing, North Dakota off ND 14.

It was built as Sterling School No. 2 in 1917. It is a small prairie schoolhouse that was moved to Florence Lake in 1937 after the preceding school burned.
