= Lake Florence (Brevard County, Florida) =

Coordinates: 28.32614°N 80.78350°W

- Location within Florida Location within the United States
- Location: Brevard County, Florida
- Type: Natural freshwater lake
- Primary inflows: Rockledge Creek
- Primary outflows: Rockledge Creek
- Basin countries: United States
- Max. length: 3,740 ft (1,140 m)
- Max. width: 1,875 ft (572 m)
- Surface area: 106.07 acres (42.93 ha)
- Surface elevation: 10 ft (3.0 m)

Lake Florence is a small lake 1,355 ft (413 m) southwest of I-95 in Brevard County, Florida. It is at the end of Tucker Lane, where a primitive boat ramp abuts the lake. This lake has no park areas or public swimming beaches.
