= Augusta Lake (Dakota County, Minnesota) =

Lake in the state of Minnesota, United States

- Location within Minnesota
- Location: Dakota County, Minnesota
- Coordinates: 44°52′41″N 93°9′25″W
- Type: Lake
- Surface elevation: 840 feet (260 m)

Augusta Lake is a lake in Dakota County, in the U.S. state of Minnesota.

Augusta Lake was named for a daughter of Henry Hastings Sibley.

== See also ==
- List of lakes in Minnesota
