= KLKX-LP =

- Alexandria, Minnesota; United States
- Frequency: 98.5 MHz
- Branding: K-Lakes 98.5

Programming
- Format: Country music

Ownership
- Owner: Alexandria Community Radio Educational Organization, Inc.

History
- First air date: June, 2016
- Call sign meaning: Sounds like the word "Lakes"

Technical information
- Licensing authority: FCC
- Facility ID: 195445
- Class: L1
- ERP: 100 watts
- HAAT: 20.32 m (67 ft)
- Transmitter coordinates: 45°50′51″N 95°23′22″W

Links
- Public license information: LMS

KLKX-LP (98.5 FM) is a radio station licensed to Alexandria, Minnesota, United States. The station is currently owned by Alexandria Community Radio Educational Organization, Inc.
