= Lake Florence (Florida) =

- Location within Florida Location within the United States
- Location: Winter Haven, Florida
- Coordinates: 28.0025°N 81.6870°W
- Type: natural freshwater lake
- Basin countries: United States
- Max. length: 2,445 feet (745 m)
- Max. width: 2,105 feet (642 m)
- Surface area: 72.59 acres (29 ha)
- Surface elevation: 128 feet (39 m)

Lake Florence is a tear-shaped natural freshwater lake in east-central Winter Haven, Florida. This lake has a 72.59-acre (293,800 m^{2}) surface area. It is surrounded on all but its east and northeast sides by residential areas. On the east it is bordered by woods and on the northeast it is bordered by a citrus grove.

There is no public access to the shore of Lake Florence, so it has no public swimming areas or boat ramps. The Hook and Bullet website, however, says the lake contains largemouth bass, bluegill and crappie.
