= Icicle Ridge =

Mountain ridge in Alpine Lakes Wilderness, Washington state, USA

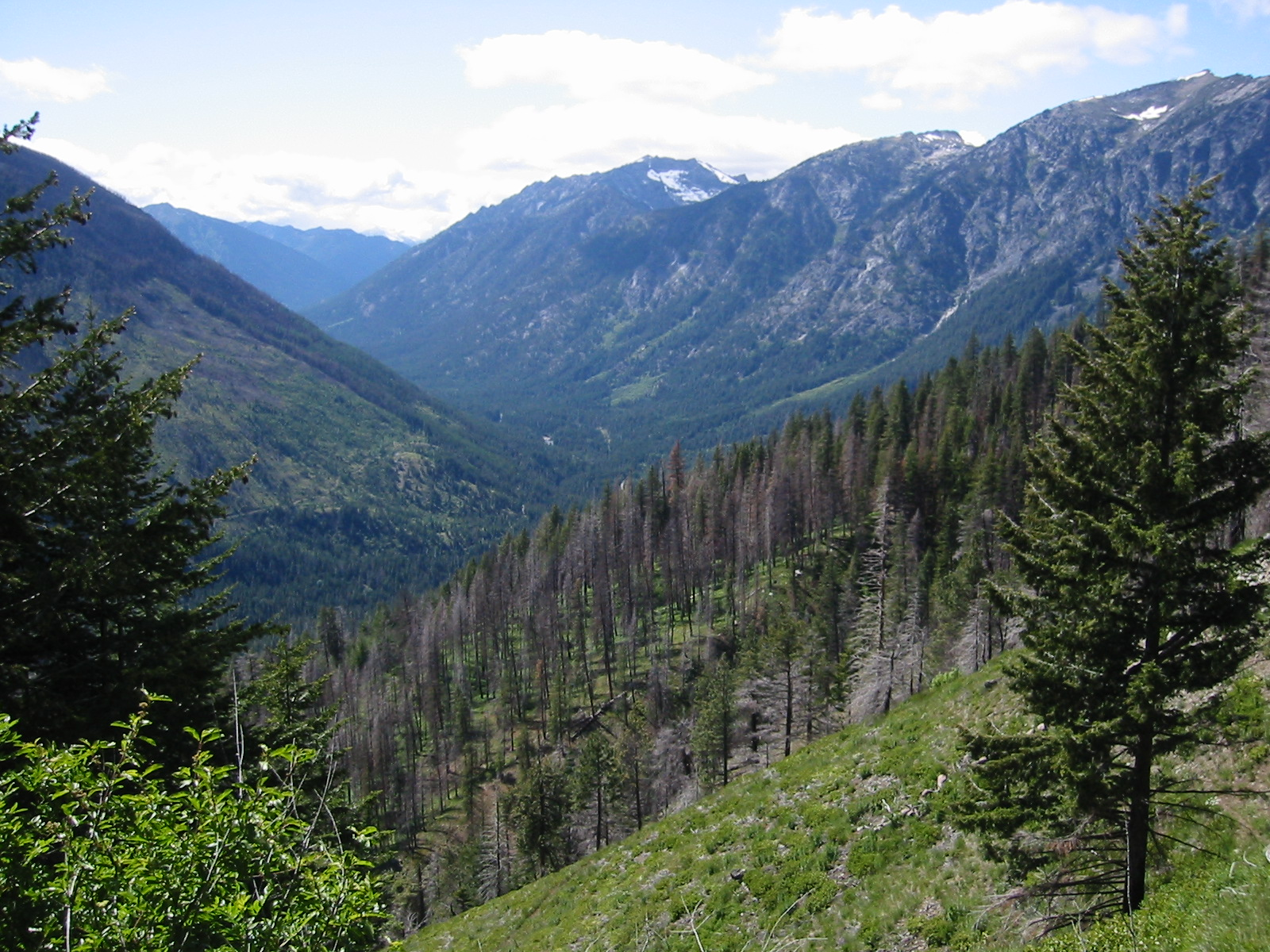
- Eastern slope of Icicle Ridge (green hill) at its junction with 4th of July trail viewing towards Big Lou on the right and Grindstone Mountain at the far center

Highest point
- Peak: Big Lou
- Elevation: 7,766 ft (2,367 m)
- Coordinates: 47°35′27″N 120°46′02″W

Dimensions
- Width: 1.1 mi (1.8 km)

Geography
- Country: United States
- States: Washington
- Parent range: Alpine Lakes Wilderness

Icicle Ridge is a mountain ridge located in the eastern border of the Alpine Lakes Wilderness, in the Washington state, United States. Several trails lead to Icicle Ridge which borders several prominent mountains, peaks, and lakes. Icicle Ridge is located at the western edge of the city of Leavenworth on land managed by the Okanogan–Wenatchee National Forest.

Icicle Ridge got its name from the river, which name comes from the Indian word na-sik-elt, meaning narrow canyon. According to Albert H. Sylvester, a topographer and Forest Service surveyor for many years, "Place the letter n at the beginning of icicle and the letter t at its end, and you practically have the Indian word."

== Geography ==
Icicle Ridge belongs to a geological drift called Leavenworth Advance with a strongly asymmetrical glacial motion off Icicle Creek that flowed into cirques along the ridge and crests of the Cascades. This gave rise to a dozen steep tributary ice streams that ran from the main ice cap on Icicle Ridge. The glacier averaged 380 metres (1,250 ft) in thickness at its main balance point. Additional tributaries flowed from the cirques along Icicle Ridge. Additional influential glacial advances include the Mountain Home and the Peshastin advance.

Icicle Ridge is one of the moraine formations of metamorphic rock belonging to the Chiwaukum Schist. The ridge is made of many large granite boulders that may have originated as the bedrock was plucked by the glacial movements plus loose boulders from alluvium, colluvium, and rockfalls from steep valley walls onto the glacier surface, including terminal and lateral moraines. Lateral moraines are abundant throughout the ridge with the exception of the lower eastern slope near the city of Leavenworth along Boundary Butte Ridge. These are steep walls with little preservation of glacial sediments. These initial slopes contain tributaries to Icicle Creek that have less boulder sediment. The southern tributaries, on the other hand, contain prominent sources of granitic boulders as remnants of glacial sediment.

== Climate ==
Icicle Ridge is located in a hemiboreal climate, part of the marine west coast climate zone of western North America, which under the Köppen climate classification, a subtype for this climate is a "dry-summer subtropical" climate, often referred to as "Mediterranean". The north–south orientation of the cascades acts as a strong topographical control of weather. Two main pressure systems affect the Cascades Range of Washington: the North Pacific High pressures and the summer Aleutian Low pressures. In both cases, the northwest of the Cascades is the point of origin of air and storms. During winter months, weather is usually cloudy, but, due to high-pressure systems over the Pacific Ocean that intensify during summer months, there is often little or no cloud cover during the summer. The months June through October offer the most favorable weather for viewing or climbing this peak.

== Watershed ==
Icicle Ridge borders several lakes and rivers along the Icicle Creek Valley.

Name	Elevation	Trail
Cabin Creek		Fourth of July Creek Trail #1579
Lake Augusta	6,857 ft (2,090 m)	Hatchery Creek Trail #1577
Carter Lake		Painter Creek Trail # 1575
Lake Edna	6,755 ft (2,059 m)	Chatter Creek Trail # 1580
Lower and Upper Florence Lake	5,794 ft (1,766 m); 6,509 ft (1,984 m)	Icicle Ridge Trail
Doelle Lakes		Chain Lakes Trail # 1569

== See also ==
- List of lakes of the Alpine Lakes Wilderness
- List of mountain ranges in Washington
