= Augusta Lake (Cottonwood County, Minnesota) =

Lake in the state of Minnesota, United States

- Location within Minnesota
- Location: Cottonwood County, Minnesota
- Coordinates: 44°0′20″N 95°16′18″W
- Type: Lake
- Surface elevation: 1,401 feet (427 m)

Augusta Lake is a lake in Cottonwood County, in the U.S. state of Minnesota.

Augusta Lake was named for the wife of an early settler.
