= Lake Ida (Frostproof, Florida) =

Coordinates: 27.76234°N 81.52139°W

- Location within Florida Location within the United States
- Location: Polk County, Florida
- Type: Natural freshwater lake
- Basin countries: United States
- Max. length: 2,625 ft (800 m)
- Max. width: 2,025 ft (617 m)
- Surface area: 85.37 acres (34.55 ha)
- Surface elevation: 79 ft (24 m)
- Settlements: Frostproof, Florida

Lake Ida is a small natural freshwater lake on the north side of Frostproof, Florida. This lake has no park areas or public swimming beaches. The north side is bordered by Lake Ida Road. The northern two-thirds of the lake is surrounded by citrus groves.
