= Lake Ida (Douglas County, Minnesota) =

Lake in the state of Minnesota, United States

- Location within Minnesota
- Location: Douglas County, Minnesota
- Coordinates: 45.9903°N 95.4181°W
- Type: lake

Lake Ida is a lake in Douglas County, in the U.S. state of Minnesota.

Lake Ida was named for a friend of a pioneer settler.

== See also ==
- List of lakes in Minnesota
