= Lake Ida (Washington) =

Lake in Washington, United States

- Location within Washington (state) Location within the United States
- Location: Chelan County, Washington, United States
- Coordinates: 47.6355220°N 120.8594197°W
- Primary outflows: Ida Creek
- Basin countries: United States
- Surface area: 15 acres (0.061 km^{2})
- Surface elevation: 6,756 ft (2,059 m)

Lake Ida is a freshwater lake located along Icicle Ridge, approximately 10 miles west of the city of Leavenworth in Chelan County, Washington. Lake Augusta is a few miles north, on the opposite side of Icicle Ridge.

== Name ==
Along with neighboring lakes, Lake Ida was given its name by Albert Hale Sylvester, a topographer for the United States Geological Survey working throughout the North Cascades National Park Complex in the 1900s. Lake Ida was named by Sylvester after a sister of his wife Alice.

== Climate ==
Lake Ida has a hemiboreal climate.

== See also ==
- List of lakes of the Alpine Lakes Wilderness
