= Lake Agnes (Douglas County, Minnesota) =

Lake in the state of Minnesota, United States

- Location within Minnesota
- Location: Douglas County, Minnesota
- Coordinates: 45°53′40″N 95°22′28″W
- Type: lake
- Surface area: 135 acres (0.55 km^{2})
- Max. depth: 35 feet (11 m)

Lake Agnes is a lake in Douglas County, in the U.S. state of Minnesota in the watershed of Long Prairie River. It is 135 acres (0.55 km^{2}) in size, and has a maximum depth of 35 feet (11 m).

Lake Agnes was named for a pioneer settler's love interest.

The lakes fish population experienced a mass die-off in 2021.

== See also ==
- List of lakes in Minnesota
