= List of county roads in Dakota County, Minnesota =

- Standard county road markers

Highway names
- Interstates: Interstate X (I-X)
- US Highways: U.S. Highway X (US X)
- County State-Aid Highways: County State-Aid Highway X (CSAH X)
- County Roads: County Road X (CR X)

System links
- County roads of Minnesota; Dakota County

The following is a list of current and former county-maintained roads in Dakota County, Minnesota, United States. County roads in Dakota County vary from multilane suburban arterials to improved roads. Many of the routes included are also county state aid highways (CSAH.) In addition, portions of County Road 23, County Road 32, and County Road 42 are components of the National Highway System.

== Route list ==
Number	Length (mi)	Length (km)	Southern or western terminus	Northern or eastern terminus	Local names	Formed	Removed	Notes
CR 4	—	—	County Road 63 in West St. Paul	MN 156 in South St. Paul	Butler Avenue	1963	current	
CSAH 5	11.483	18.480	I-35 and County Road 50 in Lakeville	I-35W and County Road 32 in Burnsville	Kenwood Trail (Lakeville)	1963	current	Locally maintained & unsigned between MN 13 and I-35W.
CR 5S	—	—	Scott County Line (County 46)	County Road 70 in Lakeville	Kenrick Avenue	1967	current	Disconnected southern portion of County Road 5
CR 6	—	—	Robert Street in West St. Paul	MN 156 in South St. Paul	Thompson Avenue	1963	current	
CSAH 8	3.71	5.97	MN 13 in Mendota Heights	County Road 14 in South St. Paul	Wentworth Avenue	1963	current	Non-CSAH west of MN 149 and east of US 52
CSAH 9	12.094	19.463	Scott County line (County 2)	County Road 31 in Lakeville	Dodd Boulevard	1963	current	
CSAH 11	3.93	6.32	County Road 42 in Burnsville	MN 13 in Burnsville		1963	current	
CSAH 14	3.291	5.296	MN 62 in Inver Grove Heights	County Road 56 in South St. Paul	Mendota Road (Inver Grove Heights / West St. Paul); 20th Avenue, Southview Boulevard, 3rd Avenue, Grand Avenue (South St. Paul)	1963	current	
CR 17	—	—	County Road 84 (267th St. W.) in Eureka Township	County Road 80 (250th St. W.) in Eureka Township	Highview Avenue	1963	current	
CSAH 23	20.478	32.956	Rice County Line (County 43)	MN 77 and County Road 38 in Apple Valley	Cedar Avenue (north of WB CSAH 80) Gambier Avenue (between WB and EB CSAH 80) Galaxie Avenue (south of EB CSAH 80)	1963	current	
CSAH 26	8.04	12.94	MN 13 in Eagan	County Road 56 in Inver Grove Heights	Lone Oak Road (Eagan); 70th Street (Inver Grove Heights)	1963	current	
CSAH 28	—	—	MN 13 in Eagan	County Road 56 in Inver Grove Heights	Yankee Doodle Road, Amana Trail, 80th Street	1963	current	Extended in 1967
CSAH 30	6.116	9.843	MN 13 in Burnsville	MN 3 in Eagan, Inver Grove Heights	Diffley Road	1963	current	
CSAH 31	19.338	31.121	County Road 78 in Farmington	MN 13 in Mendota Heights	Pilot Knob Road (north of County 50); Denmark Avenue (south of County 50)	1963	current	Non-CSAH south of County Road 74.
CSAH 32	11.223	18.062	I-35W and County Road 5 in Burnsville	County Road 71 in Inver Grove Heights	Cliff Road	1965	current	
CSAH 33	2.333	3.755	County Road 46 in Apple Valley	County Road 31 in Apple Valley	Diamond Path	1963	current	
CSAH 38	9.238	14.867	County Road 5 in Burnsville	MN 3 in Rosemount	McAndrews Road	1963	current	
CSAH 42	24.918	40.102	Scott County line (County 42)	US 61 in Hastings		1963	current	
CR 43	2.10	3.38	MN 13 in Mendota	Mendota Heights Road in Mendota Heights	Lexington Avenue	1963	current	
CSAH 43	4.917	7.913	County Road 32 in Eagan	MN 55 in Eagan	Lexington Avenue	1963	current	
CR 45	—	—	MN 13 in Lilydale	Entrance to Lilydale Regional Park	Lilydale Road	1963	current	
CSAH 46	22.999	37.013	County Road 5 in Lakeville	US 61 in Hastings		1963	current	Ends concurrently with County 47.
CSAH 47	21.061	33.894	MN 3 in Waterford	US 61 in Hastings	Northfield Boulevard	1963	current	Ends concurrently with County 46.
CR 48	—	—	Clayton Avenue (US 52 frontage road) in Coates	County Road 46 in Coates	160th Street	1963	2015	Continued to Hastings prior to 2003.
CSAH 50	10.176	16.377	I-35 and County Road 5 in Lakeville	MN 3 in Farmington	Kenwood Trail (Lakeville); Lakeville Boulevard (Farmington); Elm Street (Downtown Farmington)	1994	current	Formerly MN 50 until 1994.
CR 51	—	—	County Road 86 in Castle Rock Township	County Road 80 in Castle Rock Township	Biscayne Avenue	1963	current	
CR 53	—	—	County Road 47 in Waterford/Sciota Township	County Road 86 in Waterford/Sciota Township	Arkansas Avenue	1963	current	
CR 53N	—	—	County Road 80 in Castle Rock Township	250th Street in Castle Rock Township	Alverno Avenue	1963	current	
CSAH 54	7.176	11.549	Le Duc Drive (former MN 291) in Hastings	County Road 68 in Ravenna Township	Ravenna Trail	1963	current	
CSAH 56	4.878	7.850	Courthouse Boulevard (just beyond an interchange at US 52) in Inver Grove Heights	County Road 14 (Grand Avenue) in South St. Paul	Concord Boulevard	1994	current	Formerly MN 56 until 1994. Section between Interstate 494 and County Road 14 was part of MN 156 until 2020.
CR 59	—	—	MN 19 in Sciota Township	County Road 47 in Sciota Township	Alta Avenue	1963	current	
CSAH 60	3.312	5.330	Scott County line (County 21)	County Road 9 in Lakeville	185th Street	—	—	
CSAH 62	12.045	19.385	County Road 81 in Vermillion Township	MN 316 in Ravenna Township	190th Street	1963	current	Non-CSAH west of County Road 66.
CSAH 63	5.316	8.555	MN 55 and County Road 28 in Inver Grove Heights	MN 149 in Mendota Heights, West St. Paul	Delaware Avenue	1963	current	Non-CSAH west of County Road 66.
CSAH 64	—	—	County Road 23 in Lakeville	MN 3 in Empire Township/Farmington		1963	current	Non-CSAH west of County Road 31.
CSAH 66	9.184	14.780	MN 3 in Empire Township/Farmington	County Road 62 in Vermillion		1963	current	Reduced-conflict intersection at US 52 opened in 2014.
CSAH 68	2.305	3.710	MN 316 in Ravenna Township	Goodhue County Line (County 18)		1963	current	
CSAH 70	5.2	8.4	Scott County line (County 8)	County Road 23 in Lakeville	210th Street, Juniper Way, 215th Street	—	—	
CSAH 71	5.498	8.848	County Road 42 in Rosemount	MN 149 in Inver Grove Heights	Rich Valley Boulevard	1963	current	
CSAH 73	9.629	15.496	County Road 71 in Inver Grove Heights	Annapolis Street in West St. Paul, St. Paul (Ramsey County line)		1963	current	Northern segment
CR 73	—	—	County Road 42 in Rosemount	County Road 32 in Inver Grove Heights	Akron Avenue	1963	current	Southern segment
CSAH 74	1.005	1.617	County Road 31 in Farmington	MN 3/MN 50 in Farmington	Ash Street	1963	current	
CR 74A	—	—	Scott County line (County 29)	County Road 9 in Eureka Township	225th Street	1963	2014	Still signed as CR 74A on both ends
CR 76	—	—	County Road 89 in Douglas Township	County Road 91 in Douglas Township	230th Street	1963	current	
CSAH 78	—	—	County Road 23 in Eureka Township	MN 50 in Hampton		1963	current	
CSAH 79	—	—	County Road 47 in Castle Rock Township	Dead end at entrance to University of Minnesota land in Empire Township	Blaine Avenue	1963	current	Non-CSAH north of MN 50.
CSAH 80	14.948	24.056	County Road 9 in Eureka Township	County Road 79 in Castle Rock Township		1963	current	Formerly ended in Hampton on the route of present-day County Road 78.
CR 80S	—	—	County Road 80 in Castle Rock Township	County Road 79 in Castle Rock Township		1963	2015	Replaced by a rerouted County Road 80 in 2015.
CR 81	—	—	MN 50 in Hampton Township	County Road 46 in Coates	Clayton Avenue	1963	current	
CR 83	—	—	Dead end at Lake Byllesby Regional Park in Randolph	County Road 47 in Hampton Township	Dixie Avenue; Delilah Avenue; Donnelly Avenue	1963	current	
CR 84	—	—	Scott County line	County Road 17 in Eureka Township	267th Street	1963	current	
CSAH 85	14.974	24.098	County Road 86 in Randolph Township	County Road 42/MN 55 in Nininger Township	Goodwin Avenue; Hogan Avenue	1963	current	
CSAH 86	18.19	29.27	Rice/Scott County line (County 86)	Goodhue County line (County 29)	280th Street; Rochester Boulevard	1963	current	
CR 87	—	—	County Road 42 in Nininger Township	County Road 42 just west of Hastings		1963	2015	Served Nininger.
CSAH 88	7.94	12.78	County Road 47 in Sciota Township	Goodhue County line (County 17)		1963	current	
CR 89	—	—	MN 50 east of New Trier	County Road 47 in Marshan Township		1963	current	
CR 90	—	—	Rice County line (County 100)	County Road 23 in Greenvale Township		1963	current	
CSAH 91	—	—	Goodhue County line (County 17)	County Road 54 in Hastings	Miesville Trail; Nicolai Avenue	1963	current	Serves Miesville Ravine Park Reserve near its southern end.
CR 93	—	—	260th Street in Douglas Township	US 61 in Douglas Township	Orlando Avenue	1963	current	Follows Dakota/Goodhue County line.
CR 94	—	—	County Road 47 in Waterford Township	County Road 88 in Randolph	Cannon River Boulevard	1963	current	
CR 96	—	—	Rice County line (County 101)	MN 3 in Waterford	320th Street	1963	current	Route east of County Road 23 was paved in 2010.
Former

== See also ==
- County Roads in Minnesota
- County Road 42 (Minnesota)
