= Eureka Township, Dakota County, Minnesota =

Township in Minnesota, United States

Eureka Township
- Township
- Motto: "Your Home Town"
- Location within the state of Minnesota Eureka Township (the United States)
- Coordinates: 44°35′21″N 93°13′27″W
- Country: United States
- State: Minnesota
- County: Dakota

Area
  - Total: 35.9 sq mi (92.9 km^{2})
  - Land: 35.4 sq mi (91.6 km^{2})
  - Water: 0.50 sq mi (1.3 km^{2})
- Elevation: 980 ft (300 m)

Population (2020)
  - Total: 1,373
  - Density: 39/sq mi (15/km^{2})
- Time zone: UTC-6 (Central (CST))
  - Summer (DST): UTC-5 (CDT)
- Area codes: 952 and 651
- FIPS code: 27-19871
- GNIS feature ID: 0664113
- Website: https://eurekamn.gov/

Eureka Township is an urban township in Dakota County, Minnesota, United States. The population was 1,373 at the 2020 census.

Eureka Township was organized in 1858. Eureka is a name derived from Greek, meaning "I have found it".

== Geography ==
According to the United States Census Bureau, the township has a total area of 35.9 square miles (93 km^{2}), of which 35.3 square miles (91 km^{2}) is land and 0.5 square miles (1.3 km^{2}) (1.42%) is water.

Eureka Township lies near the western boundary line of Dakota County, and is located within its southern half.

=== Adjacent townships, cities, and communities ===
The following are adjacent to Eureka Township:

- The city of Lakeville (north-northwest)
- The city of Farmington (north-northeast)
- Empire Township (northeast)
- Castle Rock Township (east)
- The unincorporated community of Castle Rock (east-southeast)
- New Market Township of Scott County (west)

The city of Elko New Market in Scott County is nearby to the west, but does not border the township.

The city of Hampton is nearby to the east, but does not border the township.

The city of Northfield in Rice County is nearby to the south-southeast, but does not border the township.

=== Unincorporated community ===
- Eureka Center

Eureka Center is an unincorporated community, containing the Town Hall, located in the geographical center of Eureka Township.

=== Highways ===
- Dakota County Road 23 passes through Eureka Center, running north and south-southeast from the community.
- State Highway 50 (MN 50) and Dakota County Road 50 both run east–west approximately four miles north of Eureka Center.
- Dakota County Road 86 runs east–west about four miles south of Eureka Center.
- State Highway 3 (MN 3), a more prominent road, runs north–south about four miles east of Eureka Center, but with the shortest route to it via minor roads.
- Interstate 35 runs north–south, with its nearest interchange approximately four miles west-southwest from Eureka Center, if reached via minor roads.

== Demographics ==
Historical population
Census	Pop.	Note	%±
1860	480		—
1870	924		92.5%
1880	895		−3.1%
1890	761		−15.0%
1900	839		10.2%
1910	720		−14.2%
1920	712		−1.1%
1930	682		−4.2%
1940	690		1.2%
1950	600		−13.0%
1960	666		11.0%
1970	860		29.1%
1980	1,268		47.4%
1990	1,405		10.8%
2000	1,490		6.0%
2010	1,426		−4.3%
2020	1,373		−3.7%
U.S. Decennial Census

As of the census of 2000, there were 1,490 people, 496 households, and 407 families residing in the township. The population density was 42.1 inhabitants per square mile (16.3/km^{2}). There were 501 housing units at an average density of 14.2 per square mile (5.5/km^{2}). The racial makeup of the township was 97.99% White, 0.27% Native American, 0.34% Asian, 0.54% from other races, and 0.87% from two or more races. Hispanic or Latino of any race were 1.14% of the population.

There were 469 households, out of which 41.1% had children under the age of 18 living with them, 74.2% were married couples living together, 2.6% had a female householder with no husband present, and 17.9% were non-families. 14.3% of all households were made up of individuals, and 4.4% had someone living alone who was 65 years of age or older. The average household size was 3.00 and the average family size was 3.33.

In the township the population was spread out, with 30.1% under the age of 18, 6.3% from 18 to 24, 29.2% from 25 to 44, 27.4% from 45 to 64, and 6.9% who were 65 years of age or older. The median age was 38 years. For every 100 females, there were 111.0 males. For every 100 females age 18 and over, there were 109.5 males.

The median income for a household in the township was $66,875, and the median income for a family was $73,125. Males had a median income of $45,625 versus $32,788 for females. The per capita income for the township was $26,636. About 0.5% of families and 1.3% of the population were below the poverty line, including none of those under age 18 and 2.1% of those age 65 or over.
