= Cedar Avenue =

Street in Minneapolis, Minnesota and south suburbs

- North end: Washington Avenue, Minneapolis
- South end: Greenvale Avenue, Northfield

Cedar Avenue is a roadway that runs from Minneapolis to Northfield in the U.S. state of Minnesota. The roadway is known as Minnesota State Highway 77 in the busiest portion of the route, from Minneapolis to Apple Valley. The portions north and south of this are county roads, Hennepin County 152 and Dakota County 23, respectively. Its northern terminus in Minneapolis is at Washington Avenue in Cedar-Riverside, though its alignment is briefly interrupted by an interchange at Hiawatha Avenue to the south.

== Route description ==
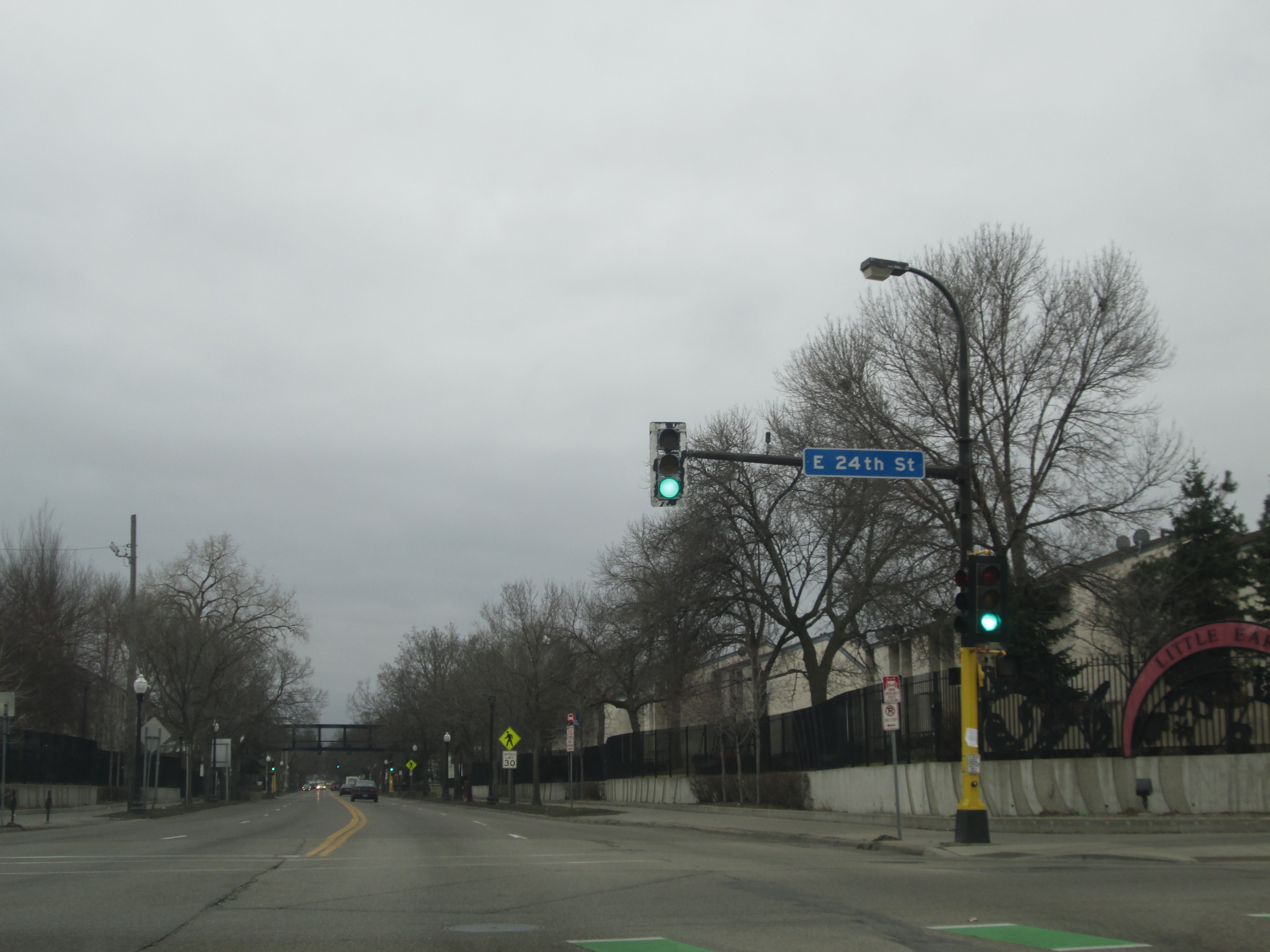
Cedar Avenue at East 24th Street in Minneapolis, looking southbound.

Cedar Avenue begins as a two-lane, undivided road in the northwestern edge of Northfield at Greenvale Avenue. It goes north, following the Falk Avenue-Eveleth Avenue plane into Dakota county, jogs west to Foliage Avenue at 320th St and west again to Galaxie Avenue at 280th Street. From 280th Street northward, Cedar Avenue is relatively continuous, with official signage first showing the name near 250th Street. There is a small rural commercial district between 250th Street and Lakeville, containing multiple greenhouses and a Buddhist temple. In Lakeville just south of 215th Street, Cedar becomes a wider four-lane roadway, and gradually more urban as it enters Lakeville. In Apple Valley Cedar goes to six lanes, and becomes a main suburban thoroughfare. At the north end of Apple Valley, near 140th Street, the county road portion ends, and Cedar becomes Minnesota State Highway 77.

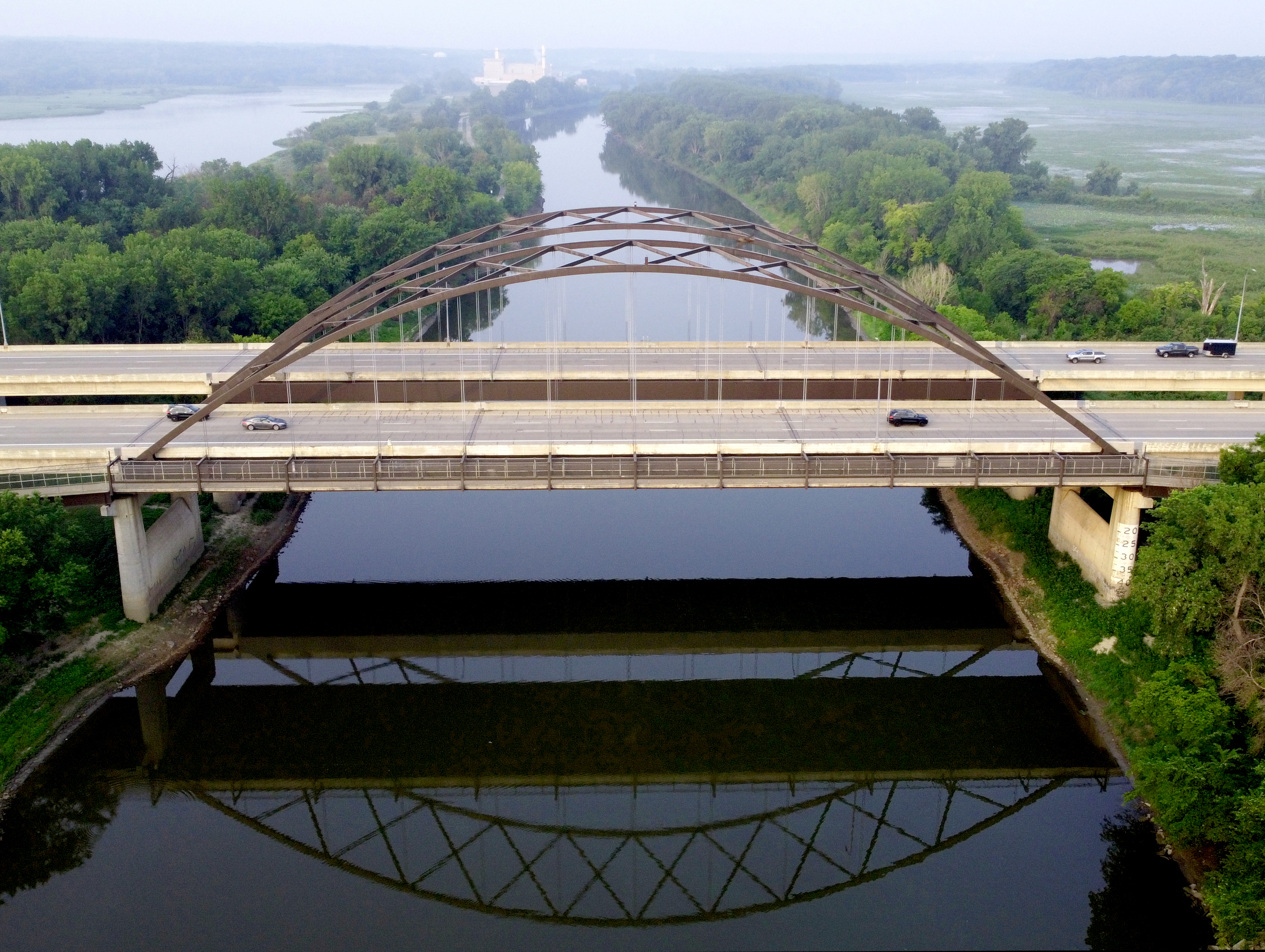
Cedar Avenue Bridge over Minnesota River in Bloomington

Cedar Avenue continues north through Eagan and across the Minnesota River at the Cedar Avenue Bridge in Bloomington. North of East Old Shakopee Road, the Cedar Avenue name is not officially signed. Cedar Avenue passes the Mall of America near its junction with Minnesota State Highway 5/Interstate 494. It continues as a freeway on the east edge of Richfield before entering Minneapolis as a two-lane city street. At the southern border of Minneapolis, its designation at Highway 77 ends and it becomes Hennepin County Road 152. Cedar continues straight north, directly across a causeway over Lake Nokomis. At Lake Street, it passes the Pioneers and Soldiers Cemetery. At Hiawatha Avenue, the road jogs slightly east to facilitate an interchange. Traffic then goes west again, and north through the Cedar-Riverside neighborhood, named after the avenue. The final junction of Cedar is at Washington Avenue. This final terminus is known as Seven Corners. Hennepin County Road 152 continues into downtown Minneapolis on Washington Avenue South.

The portion south of 250th St W in Eureka Township is no longer signed as Cedar Avenue for compliance with the Dakota County grid. Nevertheless, it remains Dakota County 23 and is usually referred to as Cedar Avenue (example).

== Historical changes ==
In Dakota County, Cedar Avenue was re-routed between Interstate 35E and the Minnesota River, to accommodate the freeway and new river crossing. The old Cedar Avenue is now known as Nicols Road.

In Hennepin County, Cedar Avenue was rebuilt slightly east of its old alignment. The old alignment is known as Old Cedar Avenue, and is no longer continuous; it is interrupted at Highway 5/494, 66th Street, and Minnesota State Highway 62. Old Cedar Avenue and Cedar Avenue merge at Edgewater Boulevard in Minneapolis.

At Hiawatha Avenue, Cedar Avenue was rerouted slightly east to accommodate an interchange.

Downtown, Cedar Avenue used to cross the Mississippi River at what is now the 10th Avenue Bridge; instead, it now ends at Washington Avenue.

== Cultural district ==
In 2020, Minneapolis officials designated a portion Cedar Avenue South as one of seven cultural districts in the city. The district's boundaries were centered around the intersection of Cedar and Riverside avenues in the Cedar-Riverside neighborhood. The purpose of the cultural district was to promote racial equity, preserve cultural identity, and promote economic growth.

== Bus Rapid Transit ==
Between Mall of America and 155th Street, Cedar Avenue houses the Red Line, previously known as the Cedar Avenue Bus Rapid Transitway.

== Major intersections ==
County	Location	mi	km	Destinations	Notes
Rice	Northfield	0.73	1.17	Greenvale Avenue	Southern terminus; CSAH 43 signage continues until Forest Avenue
Rice–Dakota county line	Northfield	1.05 0.000	1.69 0.000	CSAH 43 ends / CSAH 23 begins / North Avenue	Street assumes CSAH 23 mileage
Dakota	Greenvale Township	0.917	1.476	CR 96 east (320th Street)	Northern end signed Eveleth Avenue; south end of CR 96 overlap
Dakota	Greenvale Township	2.000	3.219	CR 96 west (320th Street)	Southern end signed Foliage Avenue; north end of CR 96 overlap
Dakota	Greenvale–Eureka township line	6.317	10.166	CSAH 86 east (280th Street) – Castle Rock	Northern end signed Foliage Avenue; south end of CSAH 86 overlap
Dakota	Greenvale–Eureka township line	6.517	10.488	CSAH 86 west (280th Street)	Southern end signed Galaxie Avenue; north end of CSAH 86 overlap
Dakota	Eureka Township	8.833	14.215	CSAH 80 east (255th Street)	South end of CSAH 80 overlap
Dakota	Eureka Township	9.514	15.311	CSAH 80 east (250th Street)	Southern end signed Cedar Avenue; northern end signed Galaxie Avenue; north end of CSAH 80 overlap
Dakota	Lakeville	13.364	21.507	CSAH 50 east (Lakeville Boulevard)	South end of CSAH 50 overlap; formerly MN 50
Dakota	Lakeville	14.259	22.948	CSAH 50 west (202nd Street)	North end of CSAH 50 overlap
Dakota	Apple Valley	19.493– 19.500	31.371– 31.382	CSAH 42	
Dakota	Apple Valley	20.612 0.000	33.172 0.000	CSAH 23 ends / MN 77 begins / 138th Street	Street assumes MN 77 mileage
Dakota	Apple Valley	1.571	2.528	CR 38 – Zoo	
Dakota	Apple Valley	1.977	3.182	127th Street / Palomino Drive	Southbound exit and northbound entrance only
Dakota	Eagan	2.566– 3.122	4.130– 5.024	I-35E – St. Paul, Albert Lea	I-35E exit 92
Dakota	Eagan	3.692	5.942	CSAH 32 (Cliff Road)	
Dakota	Eagan	4.707	7.575	CR 30 (Diffley Road)	
Dakota	Eagan	5.201	8.370	Cedar Grove Transit Station	Buses only; left exits
Dakota	Eagan	5.446	8.764	MN 13 – St. Paul, Shakopee	
Hennepin	Bloomington	7.587	12.210	CSAH 1 (Old Shakopee Road)	
Hennepin	Bloomington	8.415	13.543	Killebrew Drive / Lindau Lane	
Hennepin	Unorganized Territory of Fort Snelling	8.176– 9.735	13.158– 15.667	I-494 / MN 5	I-494 exits 2B-C
Hennepin	Unorganized Territory of Fort Snelling	10.037	16.153	Diagonal Boulevard	Southbound exit and entrance only
Hennepin	Unorganized Territory of Fort Snelling	10.559	16.993	CSAH 53 (66th Street)	
Hennepin	Unorganized Territory of Fort Snelling	11.393 17.628	18.335 28.370	MN 62 / MN 77 ends / CSAH 152 begins	Street assumes CSAH 152 mileage
Hennepin	Minneapolis	14.017	22.558	CSAH 3 (Lake Street)	
Hennepin	Minneapolis	13.254– 13.187	21.330– 21.222	MN 55	
Hennepin	Minneapolis	12.780– 12.723	20.567– 20.476	I-94 east	Access to eastbound I-94 only
Hennepin	Minneapolis	12.360– 12.301	19.891– 19.797	U of M East Bank / 3rd Street	CSAH 122 / formerly MN 122
Hennepin	Minneapolis	12.225	19.674	Washington Avenue	Northern terminus; CSAH 152 continues on Washington Avenue westbound
1.000 mi = 1.609 km; 1.000 km = 0.621 mi: Concurrency terminus; HOV only; Incomplete access; Route transition

== See also ==
- Cedar Avenue Bridge (Minnesota River)
