= Castle Rock, Minnesota =

Unincorporated community in Minnesota, United States

Castle Rock
- Unincorporated community
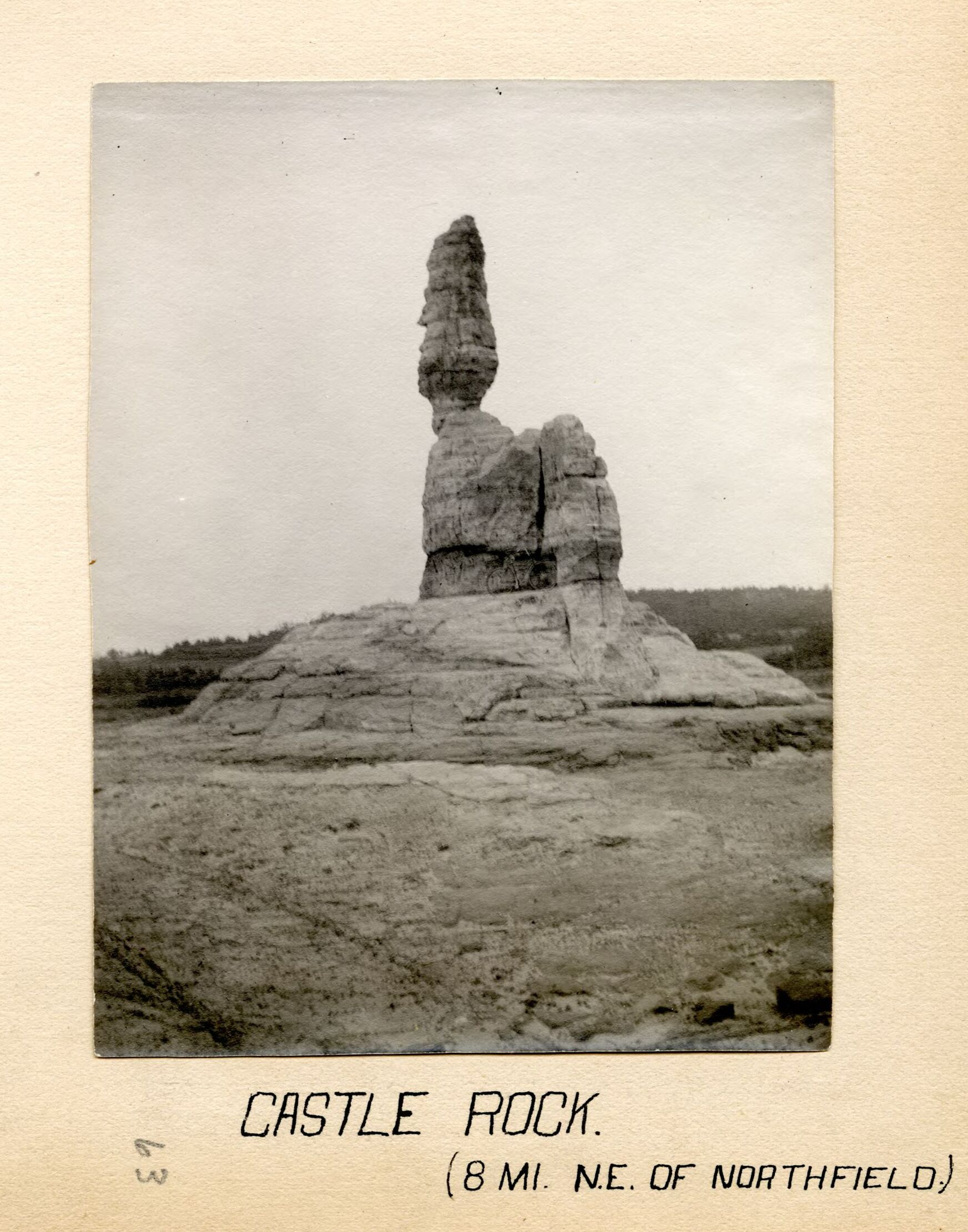
- Castle Rock, from Paul Barney, a Carleton student 1895 photo album

- Location within Minnesota Location within the United States
- Coordinates: 44°32′38″N 93°09′09″W
- Country: United States
- State: Minnesota
- County: Dakota County
- Township: Castle Rock Township
- Elevation: 938 ft (286 m)
- Time zone: UTC-6 (Central (CST))
  - Summer (DST): UTC-5 (CDT)
- ZIP code: 55010
- Area codes: 651, 507
- GNIS feature ID: 640969

Castle Rock is an unincorporated community in Castle Rock Township, Dakota County, Minnesota, United States.

== Geography ==
Castle Rock is 7 miles (11 km) north of Northfield. Nearby places also include Farmington and Randolph. State Highway 3 (MN 3) is nearby.

== Nomenclature ==
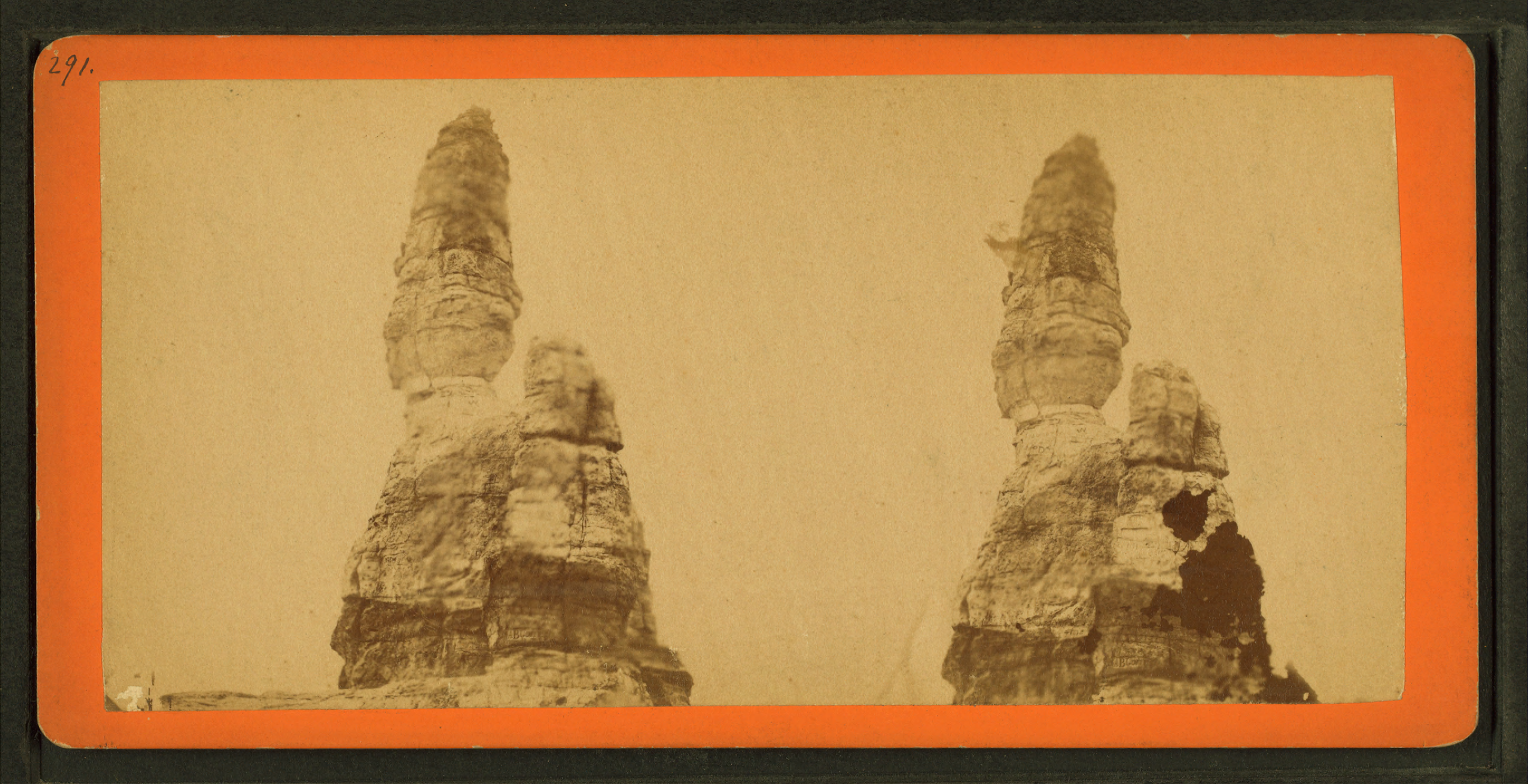
Stereoscopic image of Castle Rock by Benjamin Franklin Upton

The community is named for a local rock formation at the point where 275th Street and Cambodia Avenue join, on private property. The formation, known to Dakota Native Americans as Inyan Bosdata or "Rock Standing on End", was also the namesake of the nearby Inyan Bosdata Wakpa, known today as the Cannon River.

== History ==
A post office called Castle Rock was first established in 1858. The community took its name from Castle Rock Township.

== Education ==
The community has a school, Prairie Creek Community School.

== See also ==
- Castle Rock Township
