= Minnesota State Highway 156 =

State highway in Minnesota, United States

Trunk Highway 156
- Concord Street
- MN 156 highlighted in red

Route information
- Maintained by MnDOT
- Length: 0.798 mi (1,284 m)
- Existed: 1994–present

Major junctions
- South end: Dakota County line in South St. Paul
- North end: US 52 in St. Paul

Location
- Country: United States
- State: Minnesota
- Counties: Ramsey

Highway system
- Minnesota Trunk Highway System; Interstate; US; State; Legislative; Scenic
| ← MN 149 | → MN 165 |

Minnesota State Highway 156 (MN 156) is a 0.798-mile-long (1.284 km) highway in Minnesota, which runs from the Dakota–Ramsey county line to an interchange with U.S. Highway 52 (the Lafayette Freeway) near downtown Saint Paul. It had previously began at an interchange with Interstate 494 in South St. Paul before the Dakota County portion of the route was turned back to county maintenance in 2020.

The route serves the city of Saint Paul. From 1994 to 2020, it had also served the city of South Saint Paul.

Highway 156 is also known as Concord Street.

== Route description ==
State Highway 156 serves as a north–south route between South St. Paul and the "West Side" neighborhood of Saint Paul.

Highway 156 generally follows the Mississippi River throughout its route.

== History ==
State Highway 156 was marked in 1994. It was originally part of State Highway 56 from 1934 to 1994.

The route was renumbered 156 in 1994 when State Highway 56 was shortened to end at Hampton in southern Dakota County. Nearby Concord Boulevard in Inver Grove Heights (previously State Highway 56 as well) was designated Dakota County Road 56 in 1994.

The route has been paved since the 1920s before it was a numbered highway.

The section that is Legislative Route 112 south of the St. Paul City limits was removed in 2020, and was subsequently turned back. Part of the turned back section between Grand Avenue (Dakota County Road 14) and Interstate 494 became an extension of Dakota County Road 56.

== Major intersections ==
| County | Location | mi | km | Destinations | Notes |
|---|---|---|---|---|---|
| Dakota | South St. Paul | 0.000– 0.060 | 0.000– 0.097 | I-494 | I-494 exit 64B; interchange. |
| Dakota | South St. Paul | 2.194 | 3.531 | CR 6 (Central Avenue) | |
| Dakota | South St. Paul | 2.962 | 4.767 | CR 4 (Butler Avenue) | |
| | | 3.403 | 5.477 | MN 156 ends; Dakota–Ramsey county line | |
| Ramsey | St. Paul | 4.108– 4.201 | 6.611– 6.761 | US 52 (Lafayette Freeway) | Interchange |
1.000 mi = 1.609 km; 1.000 km = 0.621 mi: Closed/former
