= Minnesota State Highway 56 =

State highway in Minnesota, United States

Trunk Highway 56
- MN 56 highlighted in red

Route information
- Maintained by MnDOT
- Length: 99.121 mi (159.520 km)
- Existed: November 2, 1920–present

Major junctions
- South end: US 63 at Beaver Twp.
- I-90 near Austin; MN 30 at Hayfield; US 14 near Dodge Center; MN 60 at Kenyon; MN 19 near Stanton; US 52 near Hampton
- North end: MN 50 near Hampton

Location
- Country: United States
- State: Minnesota
- Counties: Fillmore, Mower, Dodge, Goodhue, Dakota

Highway system
- Minnesota Trunk Highway System; Interstate; US; State; Legislative; Scenic
← MN 55	→ MN 57

Minnesota State Highway 56 (MN 56) is a 99.121-mile-long (159.520 km) highway in southeast Minnesota, which runs from its intersection with U.S. Highway 63 near the Iowa state line and Chester, Iowa, and continues north to its northern terminus at its junction with U.S. Highway 52 and State Highway 50 in Hampton.

== Route description ==
Highway 56 serves as a north–south route in southeast Minnesota between Le Roy, Adams, Brownsdale, Hayfield, Dodge Center, West Concord, Kenyon, and Hampton.

Highway 56 begins near the Minnesota - Iowa state line and heads west through the towns of Le Roy, Adams, Taopi and Rose Creek. Near Le Roy, Highway 56 passes near Lake Louise State Park. The route then heads due north west of Rose Creek and has an interchange with Interstate Highway 90 five miles (8 km) east of Austin.

Highway 56 heads through northern Mower County and enters Dodge County north of Waltham. State Highway 30 intersects this route just west of Hayfield. Ten miles north of Hayfield, Highway 56 is concurrent with the U.S. Highway 14 bypass around Dodge Center. After passing through West Concord, the route crosses into Goodhue County.

In Kenyon, Highway 56 intersects State Highway 60 and State Highway 246 north of the city. The intersection of Highway 56 and State Highway 19 at Stanton is located between Northfield and Cannon Falls. Highway 56 enters Dakota County near Randolph, and continues for ten more miles until it reaches its northern terminus at U.S. 52 and State Highway 50 at Hampton.

At its southern end, Highway 56 is officially designated as the Shooting Star Scenic Byway from U.S. 63 north to its interchange with Interstate 90. This byway is so named because of the endangered wildflowers that bloom in June and July.

== History ==
Highway 56 was authorized on November 2, 1920 between U.S. Route 16 and Kenyon. The route was extended south to U.S. Highway 63 and north through the Twin Cities to U.S. Highway 169 in Aitkin in 1933.

The route was then terminated to various locations in Saint Paul from 1963 to 1974. The portion of Highway 56 through and north of Minneapolis was renumbered State Highway 47 in 1963.

Highway 56 had its northern terminus at what was then State Highway 3 in downtown St. Paul (now U.S. 52) from 1974 to 1994, and has ended at its current northern terminus at Hampton since 1994.

Part of the former route (Concord Street) from Interstate 494 in South St. Paul to U.S. Highway 52 in Saint Paul was marked as State Highway 156, which was then turned back to Dakota County maintenance in 2020. In addition, the portion of the former route beyond that (Concord Boulevard), running from the Saint Paul city limits south to U.S. Highway 52 in Inver Grove Heights, is now designated as Dakota County Road 56.

== Major intersections ==
County	Location	mi	km	Destinations	Notes
Fillmore	Beaver Township	0.000	0.000	US 63 – Waterloo, Spring Valley	
Mower	Windom Township	31	50	I-90 – LaCrosse, Austin	Interchange
Dodge	Hayfield	46.383	74.646	MN 30 – Hayfield, Blooming Prairie	
Dodge	Ashland Township	55.080	88.643	US 14 east – Rochester	East end of US 14 overlap
Dodge	Wasioja Township	57.726	92.901	US 14 west / US 14 Bus. – Owatonna	West end of US 14 overlap, west end of US 14 Bus. overlap
Dodge	Wasioja Township			CSAH 34 / US 14 Bus.	East end of US 14 Bus. overlap
Goodhue	Kenyon	74.922	120.575	MN 60 west	South end of MN 60 overlap
Goodhue	Kenyon	75.476	121.467	MN 60 east – Zumbrota	North end of MN 60 overlap
Goodhue	Holden Township	77.859	125.302	MN 246 west – Nerstrand	
Goodhue	Stanton Township	89.535	144.093	MN 19 west – Northfield	South end of MN 19 overlap
Goodhue	Stanton Township	90.555	145.734	MN 19 east – Cannon Falls	North end of MN 19 overlap
Dakota	Hampton Township	98.638	158.742	US 52 (Rochester Boulevard) – Rochester, St. Paul	MN 56 intersects the southbound entrance ramp of US 52
Dakota	Hampton Township	98.789	158.985	MN 50 – St. Paul, Red Wing, Farmington	
1.000 mi = 1.609 km; 1.000 km = 0.621 mi: Concurrency terminus; Incomplete access
