= County Road 42 =

County Road 42 or County Route 42 may refer to:

== Canada ==
- County Road 42 (Essex County, Ontario)

== United States ==
- County Road 42 (Lake County, Florida)
- County Road 42 (Marion County, Florida)
- County Road 42 (Dakota County, Minnesota)
- County Road 42 (Ramsey County, Minnesota)
- County Road 42 (Scott County, Minnesota)
- County Route 42 (Bergen County, New Jersey)
- County Route 42 (Monmouth County, New Jersey)
- County Route 42 (Allegany County, New York)
- County Route 42 (Cattaraugus County, New York)
- County Route 42 (Chautauqua County, New York)
- County Route 42 (Chenango County, New York)
- County Route 42 (Dutchess County, New York)
- County Route 42 (Erie County, New York)
- County Route 42 (Genesee County, New York)
- County Route 42 (Herkimer County, New York)
- County Route 42 (Livingston County, New York)
- County Route 42 (Madison County, New York)
- County Route 42 (Putnam County, New York)
- County Route 42 (Rensselaer County, New York)
- County Route 42 (Rockland County, New York)
- County Route 42 (Schoharie County, New York)
- County Route 42 (St. Lawrence County, New York)
- County Route 42 (Suffolk County, New York)
- County Route 42 (Ulster County, New York)
- County Route 42 (Warren County, New York)
- County Route 42 (Washington County, New York)
- County Route 42 (Wyoming County, New York)
