= Minnesota State Highway 149 =

State highway in Minnesota, United States

Trunk Highway 149
- Dodd Road
- MN 149 highlighted in red

Route information
- Maintained by MnDOT
- Length: 9.924 mi (15.971 km)
- Existed: 1981–present

Major junctions
- South end: MN 3 at Inver Grove Heights
- MN 55 at Eagan; I-494 at Eagan, Mendota Heights; MN 62 at Mendota Heights; MN 13 at West St. Paul, St. Paul
- North end: MN 5 at St. Paul

Location
- Country: United States
- State: Minnesota
- Counties: Dakota, Ramsey

Highway system
- Minnesota Trunk Highway System; Interstate; US; State; Legislative; Scenic
← MN 139	→ MN 156

Minnesota State Highway 149 (MN 149) is a 9.924-mile-long (15.971 km) highway in Minnesota that runs from its intersection with State Highway 3 in Inver Grove Heights to its northern terminus at its intersection with State Highway 5 (W. 7th Street) in Saint Paul.

Highway 149 is known as Smith Avenue within Saint Paul and passes over the Smith Avenue High Bridge crossing the Mississippi River. Outside of the Saint Paul city limits, Highway 149 is known as Dodd Road.

== Route description ==
Highway 149 serves as a north–south route between the communities of Eagan, Mendota Heights, West St. Paul, and the "West Side" neighborhood of Saint Paul. The northern terminus of the route is at W. 7th Street / Fort Road near downtown Saint Paul.

== History ==
Highway 149 was marked in 1981.

The route was originally authorized in 1920 as Trunk Highway 1. It was later part of U.S. Route 65 from 1927 to 1934.

The route was paved (as 65) by 1929.

In 1934, this route was renumbered State Highway 88 when U.S. 65 was rerouted on a different alignment.

The route was renumbered again in 1950 as an extension of State Highway 49.

By 1981, the route was renumbered 149 when a portion of State Highway 49 through downtown Saint Paul was turned back to local maintenance.

The Smith Avenue High Bridge over the Mississippi River was originally a steel truss bridge built around 1895 and rebuilt as a concrete arch in 1987.

On July 30, 2015, the highway was dedicated the Officer Scott Patrick Memorial Highway, named in honor of a police officer killed during a traffic stop along the highway near Bernard Street. The memorial signs were unveiled in a ceremony on the one-year anniversary of his killing.

=== Historic Dodd Road ===
Before it was a numbered highway in the 1920s, Dodd Road was a historic route in Minnesota. It was originally built in 1853 by Minnesota pioneer William B. Dodd and his crew. The road was built as a connection between the city of Mendota and the city of St. Peter (in south-central Minnesota) to help the development of St. Peter during its frontier days. Dodd Road was financed using private funds at a time when most roads were financed by the government to aid settlers. After years of lobbying by Lieutenant (later General) Jesse Reno a remaining portion of the funds allotted to his 1853 survey of the military road from the Missouri River to Mendota which was saved by the work on the Mendota/St. Peter section by the Dodd crew was awarded by the U.S government to the private builders. Present day Highway 149 bears little resemblance to the frontier road but follows the route in parts between Highways 3 and 55.

== Major intersections ==
County	Location	mi	km	Destinations	Notes
Dakota	Inver Grove Heights	0.000	0.000	MN 3	
Dakota	Inver Grove Heights	0.581	0.935	CSAH 71 (Rich Valley Boulevard)	
Dakota	Eagan	1.956	3.148	CSAH 28 (Yankee Doodle Road)	
Dakota	Eagan	2.906	4.677	MN 55 (Courthouse Boulevard) – Hastings	South end of MN 55 overlap
Dakota	Eagan	3.722	5.990	CSAH 26 (Lone Oak Road)	
Dakota	Eagan	3.381	5.441	MN 55 (Courthouse Boulevard) – Minneapolis	North end of MN 55 overlap
Dakota	Eagan–Mendota Heights line	4.005– 4.268	6.445– 6.869	I-494	Interchange
Dakota	Mendota Heights	5.644– 5.658	9.083– 9.106	MN 62	Previously MN 110
Dakota	Mendota Heights	6.737	10.842	CSAH 8 (Wentworth Avenue)	
Dakota	West St. Paul	7.960	12.810	CSAH 63 (Delaware Avenue)	
Dakota	West St. Paul–St. Paul line	8.478	13.644	MN 13 (Annapolis Street)	
Mississippi River		9.250– 9.774	14.886– 15.730	High Bridge	
Ramsey	St. Paul	9.985	16.069	MN 5 (West Seventh Street)	
1.000 mi = 1.609 km; 1.000 km = 0.621 mi: Concurrency terminus
