= Minnesota State Highway 77 =

Highway in Minnesota

Trunk Highway 77
- Cedar Avenue
- MN 77 highlighted in red

Route information
- Maintained by MnDOT
- Length: 11.403 mi (18.351 km)
- Existed: 1949, 1980–present

Major junctions
- South end: CSAH 23 in Apple Valley
- I-35E at Apple Valley–Eagan; MN 13 at Eagan; I-494 / MN 5 at Bloomington
- North end: MN 62 / CSAH 152 in Minneapolis

Location
- Country: United States
- State: Minnesota
- Counties: Dakota, Hennepin

Highway system
- Minnesota Trunk Highway System; Interstate; US; State; Legislative; Scenic
| ← MN 76 | → MN 78 |

Minnesota State Highway 77 (MN 77) is a 11.403-mile-long (18.351 km) highway in Minnesota, which runs from its intersection with 138th Street (north of Dakota County Road 42) in Apple Valley and continues north to its northern terminus at its interchange with State Highway 62 in Minneapolis. MN 77 is also known as Cedar Avenue.

The southern end of MN 77 continues in Apple Valley as Dakota County Road 23 (Cedar Avenue). At the north end, MN 77 continues in Minneapolis as Hennepin County Road 152 (Cedar Avenue).

== Route description ==
MN 77 serves as a north–south route between the cities of Apple Valley, Eagan, Bloomington, Richfield, and Minneapolis. The route is constructed to freeway standards over its entire length. Most of the route is posted 65 MPH speed limit. The route is located in Dakota County and Hennepin County.

MN 77 is concurrent with the right of way of Cedar Avenue between County 38 (McAndrews Road) in Apple Valley and Highway 62 in south Minneapolis.

South of Old Shakopee Road, which is just north of the Minnesota River, MN 77 is co-signed "Cedar Avenue" at all interchanges.

The route crosses the Minnesota River at the Cedar Avenue Bridge between Bloomington and Eagan.

The two most notable landmarks along the length of the route is the Minneapolis-Saint Paul International Airport, which sits just northeast of the junction of MN 77 and Interstate 494/MN 5, the best way to access the airport from this route is to exit on Interstate 494/MN 5 East. The Mall of America which sits just southeast of the junction of MN 77 and Interstate 494/MN 5 is the other most notable landmark. The best way to access the Mall of America from this route is to exit on Killebrew Drive or Lindau Lane.

== History ==
MN 77 was authorized in 1949; and was originally numbered 36 from 1949 to 1980 as part of MN 36. The section of the route between MN 13 at Eagan and MN 62 at Minneapolis was renumbered 77 in 1980. Present day State Highway 36 still runs from Roseville to Stillwater.

From 1980 to 1985, the southern terminus of MN 77 was at its junction with Interstate 35E at the Apple Valley–Eagan boundary line.

From 1985 to 1994, the southern portion of MN 77 followed McAndrews Road (present day County 38) eastbound along its route to the Minnesota Zoo, where the route had its southern terminus. In 1985, MN 77's mile markers were calibrated with "Mile 0" at the Zoo. In the present day, the mile markers are calibrated with the zero point at the intersection of Dakota County Roads 23 and 42.

Much of the original Cedar Avenue is still in existence, beginning at its intersection with Washington Avenue at the University of Minnesota and ending in Northfield, with the only major change being the upgrade of MN 77 as a freeway. Cedar Avenue is signed as Galaxie Avenue and Foliage Avenue between Eureka Township and Northfield.

== Exit list ==
| County | Location | mi | km | Exit | Destinations | Notes |
|---|---|---|---|---|---|---|
| Dakota | Apple Valley | 0.000 | 0.000 | - | CSAH 23 south (Cedar Avenue) / 138th Street | Continues as County 23 |
| Dakota | Apple Valley | 1.571 | 2.528 | 1A | CR 38 (McAndrews Road) – Zoo | |
| Dakota | Apple Valley | 1.977 | 3.182 | 1B | 127th Street / Palomino Drive | Southbound exit and northbound entrance only |
| Dakota | Eagan | 2.566– 3.122 | 4.130– 5.024 | 2 | I-35E – St. Paul, Albert Lea | I-35E exit 92; signed as exits 2A (north) and 2B (south) |
| Dakota | Eagan | 3.692 | 5.942 | 3 | CSAH 32 (Cliff Road) | |
| Dakota | Eagan | 4.707 | 7.575 | 4 | CR 30 (Diffley Road) | |
| Dakota | Eagan | 5.201 | 8.370 | - | Cedar Grove Transit Station | Buses only; left exits |
| Dakota | Eagan | 5.446 | 8.764 | 5 | MN 13 – St. Paul, Shakopee | Signed as exits 5A (north) and 5B (south) |
| Hennepin | Bloomington | 7.587 | 12.210 | 7 | CSAH 1 (Old Shakopee Road) | Access to Mall of America station (Blue Line / Red Line / D Line) |
| Hennepin | Bloomington | 8.415 | 13.543 | | Killebrew Drive / Lindau Lane | |
| Hennepin | Unorganized Territory of Fort Snelling | 8.176– 9.735 | 13.158– 15.667 | | I-494 / MN 5 – MSP Airport | I-494 exits 2B-C |
| Hennepin | Unorganized Territory of Fort Snelling | 10.037 | 16.153 | | Diagonal Boulevard | Southbound exit and entrance only |
| Hennepin | Unorganized Territory of Fort Snelling | 10.559 | 16.993 | | CSAH 53 (66th Street) | |
| Hennepin | Unorganized Territory of Fort Snelling | 11.393 | 18.335 | | MN 62 / Cedar Avenue north | |
1.000 mi = 1.609 km; 1.000 km = 0.621 mi: HOV only; Incomplete access
