= Eureka Center, Minnesota =

Unincorporated community in Minnesota, United States

Eureka Center
- Unincorporated community
- Location within Minnesota Location within the United States
- Coordinates: 44°35′14″N 93°13′05″W
- Country: United States
- State: Minnesota
- County: Dakota County
- Township: Eureka Township
- Elevation: 971 ft (296 m)

Population
  - Total: 30
- Time zone: UTC-6 (Central (CST))
  - Summer (DST): UTC-5 (CDT)
- Area code: 651
- GNIS feature ID: 643428

Eureka Center is an unincorporated community in Eureka Township, Dakota County, Minnesota, United States. Eureka Center is located at the center of Eureka Township along Dakota County Road 80, 5 miles (8.0 km) south-southeast of Lakeville. Nearby places also include Farmington and Elko New Market. The Eureka Town Hall is located in Eureka Center. The community had a station on the former Minneapolis, Northfield and Southern Railway.

== See also ==
- Eureka Township
