= Lewiston, Dakota County, Minnesota =

Ghost town in Minnesota, United States

Coordinates: 44°30′25″N 93°04′50″W

Lewiston
- Interactive map of Lewiston
- Founded: 1851
- Dissolved: 1866

Lewiston is an extinct community in Sciota Township in Dakota County, Minnesota, United States.

The community lay northeast of Northfield, and is nearest to the small city of Randolph. The town was once larger than Northfield. The town, set near the Cannon River and Alta Avenue, was home to many Minnesotan politicians, such as Governor Edward J. Thye, Supreme Court justice Pierce Butler and Minnesota Supreme Court justice Loren W. Collins.

From 1851 to 1866, the town stood where farmland is today. All that remains of the now abandoned town is the 1860 schoolhouse turned Sciota township hall.The town flourished as a stop between Northfield and Hastings. The Panic of 1857 resulted in railroad companies deciding to bypass the town, resulting in a sharp decline.
