= Interstate 494 =

Highway in Minnesota

Interstate 494
- I-494 highlighted in red

Route information
- Auxiliary route of I-94
- Maintained by MnDOT
- Length: 42.94 mi (69.11 km)
- Existed: 1985–present
- NHS: Entire route

Major junctions
- North end: I-94 / I-694 / US 52 in Maple Grove
- I-394 / US 12 in Minnetonka; US 212 / MN 5 in Eden Prairie; US 169 in Bloomington; I-35W in Richfield–Bloomington; MN 5 in Bloomington; I-35E in Mendota Heights; US 52 in Inver Grove Heights; US 10 / US 61 in Newport
- East end: I-94 / I-694 / US 12 in Woodbury/Oakdale

Location
- Country: United States
- State: Minnesota
- Counties: Washington, Ramsey, Dakota, Hennepin

Highway system
- Interstate Highway System; Main; Auxiliary; Suffixed; Business; Future; Minnesota Trunk Highway System; Interstate; US; State; Legislative; Scenic
← I-394	→ I-535

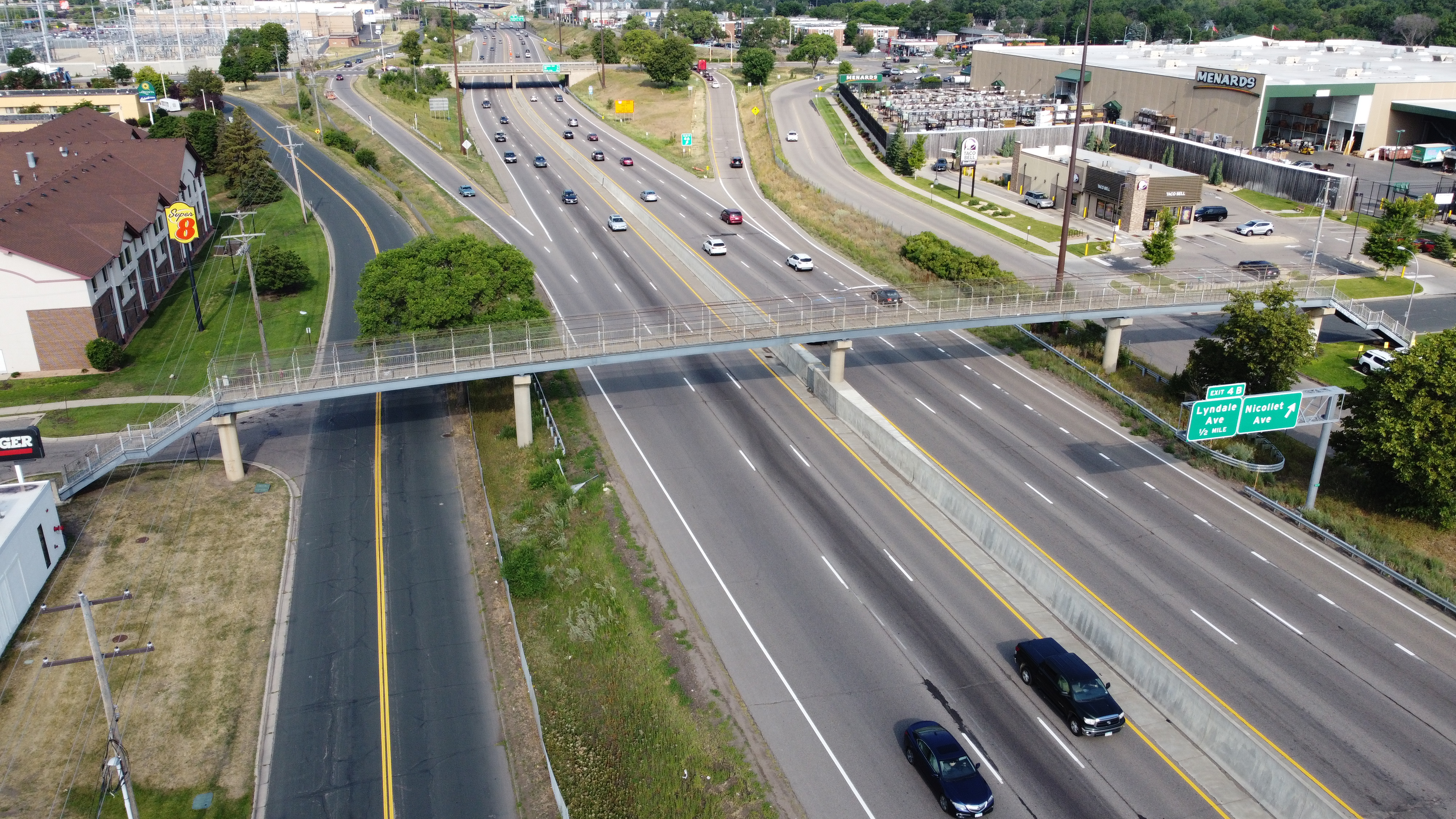
Pedestrian bridge on I-494 near Lyndale Avenue in Bloomington/Richfield

Interstate 494 (I-494) is an auxiliary Interstate Highway making up part of a beltway of I-94, circling through the southern and western portions of the Minneapolis–Saint Paul metropolitan area in Minnesota. The 42.94-mile (69.11 km) road is coupled with I-694 (which circles the northern edge of the Twin Cities metro area) at each end and composes more than half of the major beltway of the region. I-694/I-494 also act as loop routes for I-35E and I-35W.

The speed limit on I-494 is 60 mph (97 km/h). Interstate Highways outside of the loop in Minnesota may be signed as high as 70 mph (110 km/h). Most highways inside the loop are signed at speeds of 55 mph (89 km/h) or lower, though a few exceptions were added in September 2005, allowing speeds of up to 60 mph (97 km/h) in some places. Those roads had been signed at 60 mph (97 km/h) or higher up until the 1973 oil crisis.

== Route description ==
The exit numbering of I-494 is unusual in that it begins at the Minnesota River heading westbound (between Eagan and Bloomington) and continues clockwise around the entire beltway, continuing clockwise onto I-694. The last exit east of the Minnesota River is exit 71 to Pilot Knob Road. The first exit west of the river is exit 1A, which grants access to eastbound State Highway 5 (MN 5) and Minneapolis–Saint Paul International Airport. The most significant landmark on the length of I-494 is Mall of America, just south of the intersection of I-494 and MN 77.

Legally, the route of I-494 is defined as part of unmarked legislative route 393 in Minnesota Statutes § 161.12(5). I-494 is not marked with this legislative number along the actual highway.

== History ==
Construction on I-494 first began in the late 1950s, and it was finally completed in 1985. With the most recent expansion completed in November 2016 in Plymouth, I-494 is now at least three lanes in each direction for its entire route.

A major reconstruction/widening project of I-494 was completed in late 2006 between US Highway 212/State Highway 5 (US 212/MN 5) in Eden Prairie and Carlson Parkway at Minnetonka–Plymouth. There were plans for up to six lanes in each direction for parts of I-494 in Bloomington, but the majority of the city only sees four lanes and sees five in only two spots: eastbound at the East Bush Lake Road exit and further eastbound at the point where I-494 and MN 5 separate from each other.

Expansion of the Wakota Bridge between Newport and South St. Paul over the Mississippi River was completed in mid-2010. The bridge is named so because it connects Washington and Dakota counties. Near the end of this effort, I-494 was widened from two to three lanes in each direction between Lake Road and I-94 in Woodbury.

=== Traffic ===
Since its opening, I-494 has been subjected to numerous traffic problems, both eastbound and westbound. Vehicles eastbound usually start to slow down at the US 169 interchange in Bloomington and continues to slow at the interchange with MN 100, at the Bloomington–Edina city line. However, traffic is the worst at the interchange for I-35W, which is located at the Bloomington–Richfield city line. Currently, information about the study is on the City of Bloomington's website, with more information starting to come from the Minnesota Department of Transportation (MnDOT). The plan is scoped between US 169 to the Minneapolis–Saint Paul International Airport. The road sees over 500,000 passengers per day, with it being congested for more than 30 percent of the day. So far, MnDOT has determined to add E-ZPass Minnesota lanes eastbound from France Avenue to MN 77 and westbound from MN 77 to I-35W. They also plan to construct a turbine-style ramp for northbound I-35W from westbound I-494. In an effort to reduce congestion on the highway and on exits as well, MnDOT is planning to close all ramps at Nicollet Avenue and 12th Avenue and construct a full-access interchange at County State-Aid Highway 35 (CSAH 35; Portland Avenue), with two onramps and two offramps to replace the ramps. Problems have been addressed throughout the entire corridor, with all the highways being included. Construction for the Metro Orange Line tunnel began in 2019 and was completed in 2021. The remainder of the corridor's construction began in 2023, and most of the corridor is still under construction today.

== 494 Corridor Commission ==
The 494 Corridor Commission, also known as 494 Commuter Services, is a nonprofit organization aimed at reducing traffic congestion along the southwest section of the I-494 corridor. In 1988, the cities of Bloomington, Eden Prairie, Edina, Minnetonka, and Richfield joined to address traffic congestion and work toward improving I-494. The organization's mission is to promote economic growth and regional prosperity through improved transportation options along the highway, such as carpooling and bus transit. The organization's board of directors consists of representatives from each of the five member cities, MnDOT, the Metropolitan Council, and the private business community.

== Exit list ==
County	Location	mi	km	Exit	Destinations	Notes
Washington	Oakdale	58.158	93.596		I-694 north	Continuation beyond I-94
Washington	Oakdale–Woodbury line	58.158	93.596	58	I-94 / US 12 – St. Paul, Eau Claire	Signed as exits 58A (west) and 58B (east); I-94 exit 249
Washington	Woodbury	58.999	94.950	58C	Tamarack Road	
Washington	Woodbury	59.852	96.322	59	Valley Creek Road (CSAH 16)	Formerly MN 120
Washington	Woodbury	60.690	97.671	60	Lake Road (CSAH 25 north)	
Ramsey–Washington county line	Maplewood–Newport line	63.177	101.674	63A	US 10 west / US 61 north / CSAH 18 east (Bailey Road) / Great River Road (National Route) north – St. Paul	Eastern end of Great River Road concurrency; Bailey Road not signed eastbound
Washington	Newport	63.177	101.674	63B	US 10 east / US 61 south – Hastings	Westbound access to US 10 west/US 61 north via exit 63A
Washington	Newport	63.408	102.045	63C	Maxwell Avenue (CSAH 38 south)	Eastbound exit and westbound entrance
Dakota	South St. Paul	63.995	102.990	Wakota Bridge over the Mississippi River		
Dakota	South St. Paul	64.204	103.326	64A	Hardman Avenue	
Dakota	South St. Paul	64.646	104.038	64B	CSAH 56 (Concord Street) / Great River Road (National Route) south	Western end of Great River Road concurrency; formerly MN 156; previously MN 56
Dakota	South St. Paul	65.125– 65.251	104.809– 105.011	65	5th Avenue, 7th Avenue	
Dakota	Inver Grove Heights	66.148	106.455	66	US 52 – St. Paul, Rochester	
Dakota	Inver Grove Heights	66.391– 67.170	106.846– 108.100	67	MN 3 (Robert Street) / MN 62	MN 62 not signed eastbound, access eastbound to MN 62 via MN 3 north
Dakota	Eagan–Mendota Heights line	70.049	112.733	69	MN 149 (Dodd Road) to MN 55	MN 55 crosses I-494 west of I-35E, but with no direct access
Dakota	Eagan–Mendota Heights line	70.815	113.966	70	I-35E – St. Paul, Albert Lea	I-35E exits 99A-B
Dakota	Eagan–Mendota Heights line	71.906	115.721	71	CSAH 31 (Pilot Knob Road)	
Dakota–Hennepin county line	Eagan–Mendota Heights– Bloomington tripoint	73.021 0.000	117.516 0.000	I-494 Bridge over the Minnesota River		
Hennepin	Bloomington	1.257	2.023	1A	MN 5 east – Terminal 1	Eastern end of MN 5 concurrency
Hennepin	Bloomington	1.637	2.634	1B	34th Avenue – Terminal 2	Diverging diamond interchange; METRO Blue Line light rail runs in the median of 34th Avenue
Hennepin	Bloomington	2.355	3.790	2A	CSAH 1 south (24th Avenue)	
Hennepin	Richfield–Bloomington line	2.836	4.564	2	MN 77 (Cedar Avenue)	Signed as exits 2B (north) and 2C (south)
Hennepin	Richfield–Bloomington line	3.358– 3.856	5.404– 6.206	3	CSAH 35 (Portland Avenue)	Previously eastbound entrance and westbound exit at 12th Avenue; Portland Avenue became full access in 2025
Hennepin	Richfield–Bloomington line	4.357	7.012	4	CSAH 52 north (Nicollet Avenue)	Closed in January 2026 as part of the US 169 to MN 5 project, signed as exit 4A prior to closure
Hennepin	Richfield–Bloomington line	4.854	7.812	4	Lyndale Avenue	Previously signed as exit 4B prior to the Nicollet Avenue interchange closure
Hennepin	Richfield–Bloomington line	5.343	8.599	5	I-35W – Minneapolis, Albert Lea	Segment was converted from cloverleaf to a turbine interchange; signed as exits 5A (north) and 5B (south); I-35W exits 8B-C
Hennepin	Richfield–Bloomington line	5.851	9.416	5C	CSAH 32 (Penn Avenue)	
Hennepin	Bloomington	6.875	11.064	6	CSAH 17 (France Avenue)	
Hennepin	Bloomington	7.926	12.756	7	MN 100 north / CSAH 34 (Normandale Boulevard)	Signed as exits 7A (north) and 7B (south)
Hennepin	Bloomington	8.521	13.713	8	CSAH 28 (East Bush Lake Road)	
Hennepin	Bloomington–Eden Prairie line	10.114	16.277	10A	US 169	Eastbound access to US 169 north via exit 10B
Hennepin	Bloomington–Eden Prairie line	10.114	16.277	10B	Washington Avenue	Eastbound exit and westbound entrance
Hennepin	Eden Prairie	11.659	18.763	11A	CSAH 61 (Flying Cloud Drive) / Prairie Center Drive	Westbound exit and eastbound entrance
Hennepin	Eden Prairie	11.923	19.188	11	US 212 / MN 5 west	Western end of MN 5 concurrency; signed as exits 11B (east) and 11C (west)
Hennepin	Eden Prairie	12.233	19.687	12	CSAH 39 (Valley View Road)	Southbound exit and northbound entrance
Hennepin	Minnetonka	13.899	22.368	13	MN 62 east / CSAH 62 west	
Hennepin	Minnetonka	16.267	26.179	16	MN 7	Signed as exits 16A (east) and 16B (west)
Hennepin	Minnetonka	16.970	27.311	17	Minnetonka Boulevard	
Hennepin	Minnetonka	19.513	31.403	19	I-394 east / US 12 – Minneapolis, Wayzata	Cloverleaf interchange; signed as exits 19A (east) and 19B (west); I-394/US 12 exit 1
Hennepin	Plymouth	20.366	32.776	20	Carlson Parkway	
Hennepin	Plymouth	21.302	34.282	21	CSAH 6	
Hennepin	Plymouth	22.272	35.843	22	MN 55	
Hennepin	Plymouth	23.522	37.855	23	CSAH 9 (Rockford Road)	
Hennepin	Maple Grove	26.203	42.170	26	CSAH 10 (Bass Lake Road)	
Hennepin	Maple Grove	27.993	45.050	27	I-94 west / US 52 west – St. Cloud	Northbound left exit and southbound entrance; I-94 exit 216
Hennepin	Maple Grove	27.993	45.050		I-94 east / I-694 east / US 52 north	Beltway continues as I-94/I-694 east/US 52 south
1.000 mi = 1.609 km; 1.000 km = 0.621 mi: Closed/former; Concurrency terminus; Incomplete access
