= Minnesota State Highway 13 =

State highway in Minnesota, United States

Trunk Highway 13
- Sibley Memorial Highway
- MN 13 highlighted in red

Route information
- Maintained by MnDOT
- Length: 111.694 mi (179.754 km)
- Existed: 1920–present

Major junctions
- South end: I-35 BL / US 65 in Albert Lea
- US 69 in Albert Lea; I-90 at Albert Lea; MN 30 at New Richland; US 14 at Waseca; MN 60 at Waterville; MN 21 between Montgomery and New Prague; MN 19 at New Prague; I-35W at Burnsville; MN 77 at Eagan; MN 55 / MN 62 at Mendota Hts.; I-35E at Lilydale
- North end: MN 149 at West St. Paul / Saint Paul

Location
- Country: United States
- State: Minnesota
- Counties: Freeborn, Waseca, Le Sueur, Scott, Dakota, Ramsey

Highway system
- Minnesota Trunk Highway System; Interstate; US; State; Legislative; Scenic
← US 12	→ US 14

Minnesota State Highway 13 (MN 13) is a 111.694-mile-long (179.754 km) highway in Minnesota that runs from its intersection with U.S. Highway 65 in Albert Lea to its northern terminus at its intersection with State Highway 149 at the West St. Paul / Saint Paul city boundary line.

== Route description ==
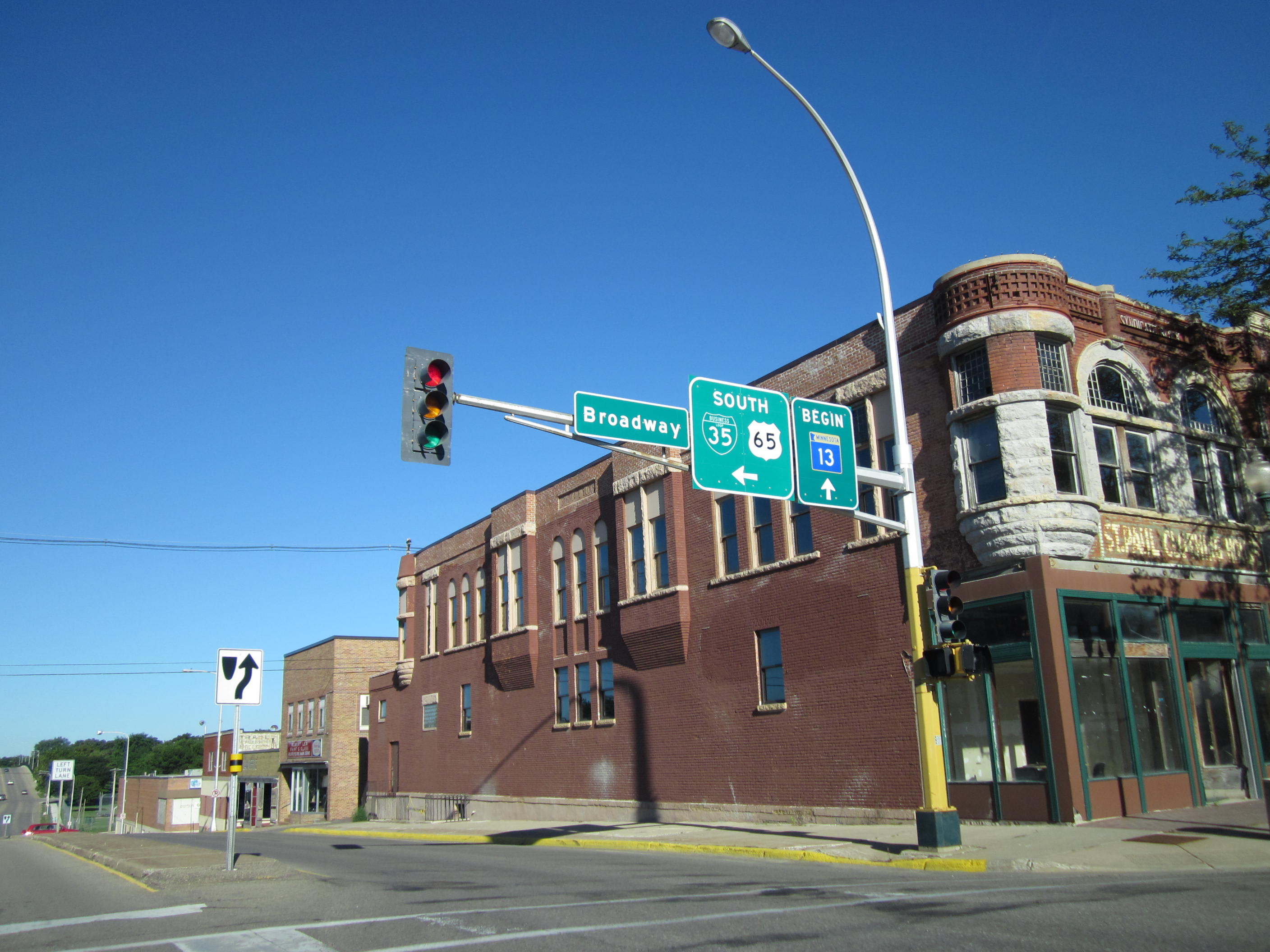
Southern terminus of MN 13 in Albert Lea

State Highway 13 serves as a north–south route between Albert Lea, Waseca, Prior Lake, Savage, Burnsville, Eagan, Mendota Heights, West St. Paul, and the "West Side" neighborhood of Saint Paul.

The southern terminus of the route is at the intersection of Main Street and Broadway Avenue (U.S. 65 / Business Loop 35) in the city of Albert Lea.

The northern terminus of Highway 13 is at the intersection of Annapolis Street and Smith Avenue (Highway 149) at the West St. Paul / Saint Paul city boundary line.

Highway 13 is built as a divided highway between Savage, Burnsville, and Eagan. This portion of the route is a busy metro area corridor paralleling the Minnesota River.

At the junction with CSAH 101 in Savage, leading to US 169, Highway 13 turns east. This junction is a hybrid: traffic moving from CSAH 101 toward Highway 13 is grade separated, with through traffic connecting to Highway 13 north, and with exit and entrance ramps connecting to Highway 13 south; southbound traffic on Highway 13 uses a continuous green T-intersection, while through traffic connects to CSAH 101.

Highway 13 is also built as a divided highway in Mendota Heights between I-494 (no interchange / junction) to State Highway 55. The section of Highway 13 north of State Highway 55 at Mendota is far less busy.

Highway 13 is also known as Sibley Memorial Highway in Lilydale, Mendota, and Eagan.

The Sibley House Historic Site museum in Mendota, overlooking Fort Snelling, is located immediately north of the junction of Highways 13 and 62. The museum is on Highway 13.

Highway 13 is also known as Langford Avenue in Spring Lake Township and Cedar Lake Township in Scott County.

The route follows Main Street and 4th Avenue SW in New Prague. Highway 13 follows 4th Street in Montgomery.

In the city of Waseca, Highway 13 is also known as State Street.

The 200MW (with possible expansion to 400MW) Bent Tree Wind Farm was scheduled to be built in 2009 along Highway 13 between Manchester and Hartland. The farm being developed by Wind Capital and Alliant Energy would be the biggest wind farm in the state of Minnesota.

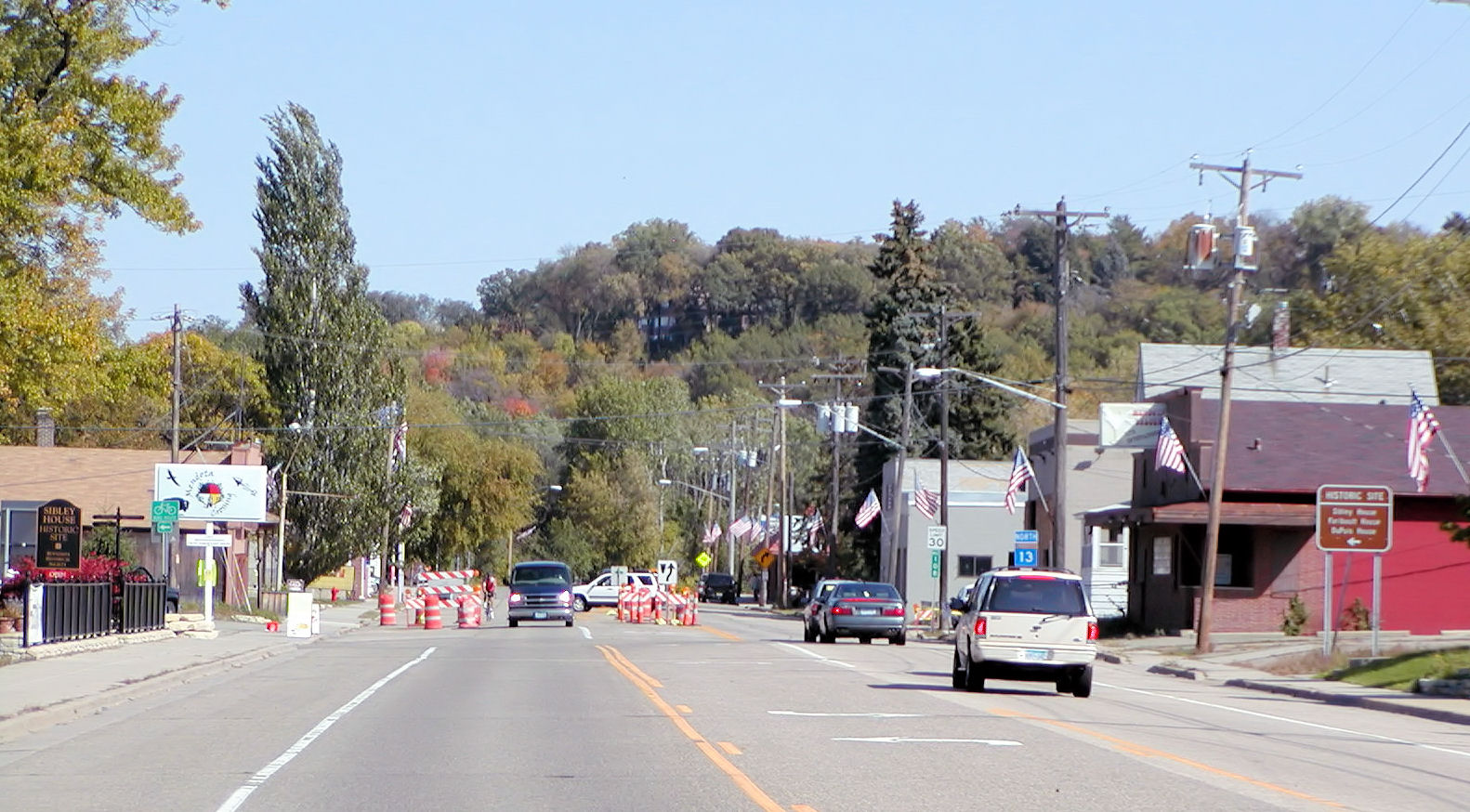
MN 13 in Mendota

== History ==
State Highway 13 was authorized in 1920 from Albert Lea to Jordan. In 1934, the segment between New Prague and Jordan was redesignated Highway 21, and Highway 13 moved to the east and extended north through Prior Lake, Savage, and Burnsville; then northeast to its northern terminus in West Saint Paul.

From 1934 to 1935, Highway 13 also ran from Albert Lea south to the Iowa state line. In 1935, U.S. Highway 69 was extended north into Minnesota, assuming that 12 mile section of the route.

The route was completely paved by 1940.

In the late 1960s, U.S. Highway 16 was decommissioned in the Albert Lea area. Highway 13 was then extended east on Main Street in Albert Lea between its intersection with U.S. 69 to its intersection with U.S. 65. Later, US 69 was truncated to the present terminus, and MN 13 was extended along US 69's route.

In 1994, the nearby Mendota Bridge was rebuilt between Mendota Heights and Fort Snelling. Highway 13 was rerouted in Mendota Heights at this time so it could intersect with State Highway 55 and State Highway 110 (present day State Highway 62). The old alignment of Highway 13 in the southwest corner of Mendota Heights (Sibley Memorial Drive) is still under state maintenance and has the unmarked designation of Highway 913-A.

== Major intersections ==
County	Location	mi	km	Destinations	Notes
Freeborn	Albert Lea	0.000	0.000	I-35 BL / US 65 (Broadway south, Main Street north) / CSAH 46 east – I-35	Southern end of CSAH 46 concurrency
Freeborn	Albert Lea	1.161	1.868	US 69 south / CSAH 46 west	National northern end of US 69; northern end of CSAH 46 concurrency
Freeborn	Manchester Township	4.418	7.110	I-90 – Austin, Blue Earth	I-90 exit 154
Waseca	New Richland Township	19.582	31.514	MN 30 – Ellendale, Mapleton	
Waseca	Waseca	31.339	50.435	US 14 – Owatonna, Mankato	Interchange
Rice	No major junctions				
Le Sueur	Waterville	43.706	70.338	MN 60 – Faribault, Mankato	
Le Sueur	Montgomery Township	56.475	90.888	MN 99 – Le Center, Faribault	
Le Sueur	Montgomery	59.839	96.302	MN 21 south / CR 161 – Faribault	South end of MN 21 concurrency
Le Sueur–Scott county line	New Prague	67.885	109.250	MN 19 west / MN 21 north – Jordan, Le Sueur	North end of MN 21 concurrency; west end of MN 19 concurrency
Rice–Scott county line	Cedar Lake–Wheatland township line	71.951	115.794	MN 19 east – Northfield	East end of MN 19 concurrency
Scott	Spring Lake Township	82.133	132.180	MN 282 west – Jordan	
Scott	Savage	91.974	148.018	To US 169 / CSAH 101	Hybrid continuous green T-intersection and partial interchange
Scott	Savage	92.916	149.534	Dakota Avenue / Vernon Avenue / Yosemite Avenue	Interchange; signed "Dakota Avenue" northbound
Scott	Savage	93.6	150.6	Quentin Avenue	Proposed interchange
Scott	Savage	94.3	151.8	Huntington Avenue	Proposed interchange; to be an westbound exit and entrance
Dakota	Burnsville	94.6	152.2	Chowen Avenue	Proposed interchange; to be an eastbound exit only
Dakota	Burnsville	95.0	152.9	Washburn Avenue	Proposed interchange; to be an westbound exit and eastbound entrance
Dakota	Burnsville	95.663	153.955	CSAH 5	Interchange
Dakota	Burnsville	96.501	155.303	I-35W – Minneapolis, Albert Lea	I-35W exits 3A-B
Dakota	Burnsville	97.0	156.1	Nicollet Avenue	Proposed interchange
Dakota	Eagan	101.098	162.701	MN 77 (Cedar Avenue)	Interchange
Dakota	Mendota Heights	106.241	170.978	MN 55 – Minneapolis, Rochester	
Dakota	Mendota Heights	106.930	172.087	MN 55 west / MN 62 / Great River Road (National Route)	Previously MN 110; southern end of Great River Road overlap
Dakota	Mendota Heights	109.459	176.157	I-35E / Great River Road (National Route) / Great River Road Spur begins	I-35E exit 102; northern end of Great River Road overlap
Dakota–Ramsey county line	West St. Paul–Saint Paul line	111.298	179.117	Great River Road Spur (Cherokee Heights Boulevard)	
Dakota–Ramsey county line	West St. Paul–Saint Paul line	111.694	179.754	MN 149 (Smith Avenue)	
1.000 mi = 1.609 km; 1.000 km = 0.621 mi: Concurrency terminus; Unopened
