= County State-Aid Highway 42 (Minnesota) =

Highway in Minnesota, U.S.

County Road 42
- CR 42 highlighted in red

Route information
- Length: 33.347 mi (53.667 km)
- Tourist routes: Great River Road

Major junctions
- West end: CSAH 17 in Shakopee
- MN 13 in Savage; I-35W in Burnsville; I-35E in Burnsville; CSAH 23 in Apple Valley; MN 3 in Rosemount; US 52 in Rosemount; MN 55 near Rosemount
- East end: US 61 in Hastings

Location
- Country: United States
- State: Minnesota
- Counties: Dakota and Scott

Highway system
- County roads of Minnesota

County State-Aid Highway 42 (CSAH 42), usually called County Road 42 (CR 42), is a 33.347-mile-long (53.667 km) county highway in Dakota and Scott counties in the southeastern part of the U.S. state of Minnesota. It is a primary arterial highway in the two counties. These two counties form the southernmost portion of the 13-county Twin Cities metropolitan area, although CSAH 42 travels across the northern reaches of the two counties.

== Route description ==
County Road 42 serves as an east–west arterial route for the South of the River suburbs of the Minneapolis – Saint Paul area. The roadway connects the communities of Shakopee, Prior Lake, Savage, Burnsville, Apple Valley, Rosemount, and Hastings; which are all located south of the Minnesota River.

From west to east, the route follows 140th Street, Egan Drive, 150th Street and 145th Street. Its westernmost terminus is at Shakopee in Scott County, where it intersects County Road 17 (Marschall Road). The eastern terminus of County 42 is at Hastings in Dakota County, where it meets U.S. Highway 61.

County 42 is designated as a principal arterial highway by the Metropolitan Council, and the roadway is supposed to have limited commercial access and traffic signals only at one-half mile intervals. However, because it was used as a primary commercial road before its designation as a principal arterial highway, it passes directly through the downtown areas of several cities in Scott and Dakota Counties; most notably Burnsville and Apple Valley in Dakota County

Most of County Road 42 is designated as part of the National Highway System. The major highways it intersects from west to east are: State Highway 13, Interstate 35W, Interstate 35E, Cedar Avenue two miles (3 km) south of the terminus of State Highway 77, State Highway 3, U.S. 52, State Highway 55, and U.S. 61.

== History ==
County Road 42 was authorized and paved during the 1960s.

In July 2007, construction began to widen County Road 42 to six lanes from Glendale Road in Savage to County Road 5 in Burnsville. Also, the old traffic signals between Glendale Road and County Road 5, were replaced with new ones. The project was completed by summer 2008.

== Future ==
A proposed reconstruction project at the interchange with U.S. Highway 52 in Rosemount, will reconstruct the interchange to a cloverleaf interchange. The purpose of the project is to provide movement between the north and the east with the closure of the nearby US 52 / MN 55 interchange. Phase 1 of construction will start in 2017, with widening of County Road 42 to 4 lanes, including turn lanes and replacement of Highway 52 bridges.

== Major Intersections ==
County	Location	mi	km	Destinations	Notes
Scott	Shakopee	0.000	0.000	CSAH 17 (Marschall Road)	Western terminus
Scott	Prior Lake	1.542	2.482	CSAH 83 (Canterbury Road South)	
Scott	Prior Lake	3.039	4.891	CSAH 21 (Eagle Creek Avenue Northeast)	
Scott	Prior Lake	4.518	7.271	CSAH 18 (Crest Avenue Northeast)	
Scott	Savage	5.973	9.613	MN 13	
Scott	Savage	6.996	11.259	CSAH 27 (Dakota Avenue South)	
Dakota	Burnsville	9.711	15.628	CSAH 5	
Dakota	Burnsville	10.744	17.291	I-35W	
Dakota	Burnsville	11.105	17.872	I-35E	
Dakota	Burnsville	12.151	19.555	CR 11	
Dakota	Apple Valley	14.360	23.110	CSAH 23 (Cedar Avenue)	To MN 77
Dakota	Apple Valley	14.790	23.802	Galaxie Avenue West	
Dakota	Apple Valley	16.296	26.226	CSAH 31 (Pilot Knob Road)	
Dakota	Rosemount	18.720	30.127	MN 3	
Dakota	Rosemount	23.524	37.858	US 52	Interchange
Dakota	Rosemount	27.631	44.468	MN 55 west / Great River Road (National Route)	Western end of MN 55 and Great River Road overlap
Dakota	Nininger Township			MN 55 east / CSAH 85 south	Eastern end of MN 55 overlap
Dakota	Hastings	33.347	53.667	To US 61 / Great River Road (National Route)	Eastern terminus
1.000 mi = 1.609 km; 1.000 km = 0.621 mi
