= Karl F. Grittner =

American educator and politician

Karl Frederick Grittner (November 22, 1922 – March 3, 2011) was an American educator and politician.

Grittner was born in West St. Paul, Minnesota and graduated from the Mechanic Art High School in Saint Paul, Minnesota in 1940. He lived with his wife and family in Saint Paul, Minnesota. Grittner graduated from Hamline University in 1945 and went to the National Institute of Public Affairs in Washington, D.C. Grittner also received his master's and doctorate degrees from University of Minnesota. He taught at Cleveland Junior High School in Saint Paul, Minnesota. Grittner served in the Minnesota House of Representatives from 1953 to 1958 and in the Minnesota Senate from 1959 to 1970. He was a Democrat[. Grittner died from pancreatic cancer at his daughter's house in San Antonio, Texas. His wife died in 2004.
