= West St. Paul, Minnesota =

City in Minnesota, United States

West St. Paul
- City
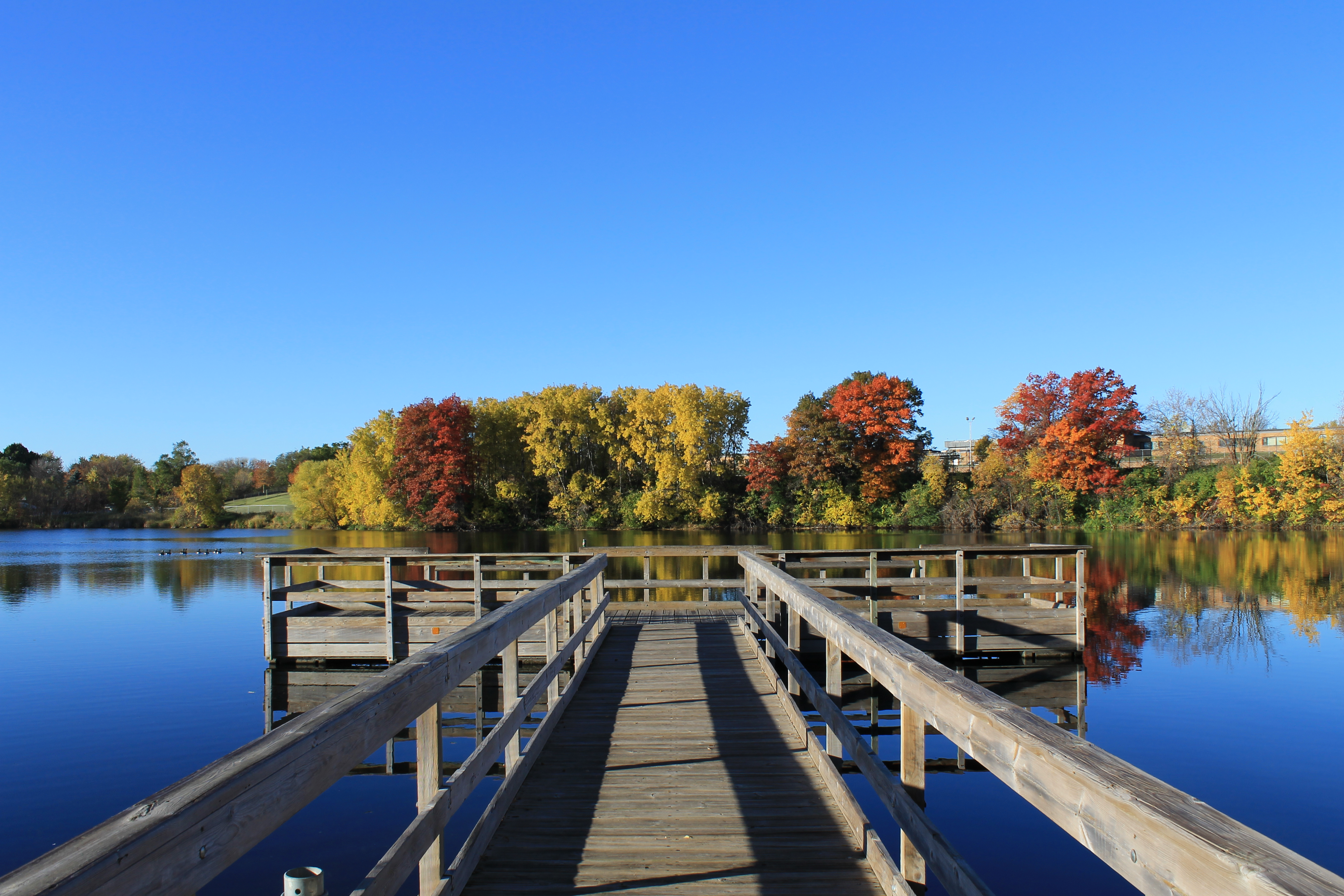
- Nickname: W.S.P.
- Motto: "We're Close To It All"
- Location of the city of West St. Paul within Dakota County, Minnesota
- Coordinates: 44°54′58″N 93°06′06″W
- Country: United States
- State: Minnesota
- County: Dakota
- Founded: 1858
- Incorporated: February 23, 1889

Government
  - Mayor: Dave Napier

Area
  - Total: 5.01 sq mi (12.98 km^{2})
  - Land: 4.91 sq mi (12.71 km^{2})
  - Water: 0.10 sq mi (0.27 km^{2})
- Elevation: 1,027 ft (313 m)

Population (2020)
  - Total: 20,615
  - Estimate (2022): 21,794
  - Density: 4,200/sq mi (1,621.7/km^{2})
- Time zone: UTC-6 (Central (CST))
  - Summer (DST): UTC-5 (CDT)
- ZIP code: 55118
- Area code: 651
- FIPS code: 27-69700
- GNIS feature ID: 654003
- Sales tax: 8.625%
- Website: wspmn.gov

West St. Paul is a city in Dakota County, Minnesota, United States. The population was 20,615 at the 2020 census. It is immediately south of Saint Paul and immediately west of South St. Paul.

== History ==
The city's confusing name comes from its location on the west bank of the predominantly north-to-south Mississippi River, though a myth—that it was named because it was "west of South St. Paul"—was created by Jake H. Marthaler in the mid-20th century and has persisted. The city sits on the site of a previous West St. Paul, which predated the current county lines and was partially in what is now called Saint Paul's Lower West Side. According to the West 7th/Fort Road foundation, Saint Paul annexed the West Side for two reasons: "to aid law enforcement—criminals could escape Saint Paul authorities by crossing to the West Side and Dakota County—and to eliminate the Wabasha Street Bridge tolls which were inhibiting development on the West Side". West St. Paul continued to exist independently in Dakota County from 1874 until 1887, when the city of South St. Paul was incorporated in its place. In 1889, the current city of West St. Paul split off from the still new South St. Paul and reclaimed the original name. The population was 20,615 at the 2020 census, growing by 1,075 since the 2010 census. West Saint Paul is known for its 2.5-mile retail strip along Robert Street.

== Geography ==
According to the United States Census Bureau, the city has an area of 5.01 square miles (12.98 km^{2}), of which 4.91 square miles (12.72 km^{2}) is land and 0.10 square miles (0.26 km^{2}) is water.

U.S. Highway 52 (also known as the Lafayette Freeway), Robert Street, and Minnesota Highway 62 are three of West St. Paul's main routes. Interstate Highway 494 runs just south of the city and Minnesota Highway 3 (unmarked Route 952) runs through the middle of the city and into downtown Saint Paul as Robert Street. Robert Street was named for Captain Louis Robert, a Mississippi River boat captain and early French-Canadian settler of Saint Paul.

== Demographics ==
Historical population
Census	Pop.	Note	%±
1890	1,596		—
1900	1,830		14.7%
1910	2,660		45.4%
1920	2,962		11.4%
1930	4,463		50.7%
1940	5,733		28.5%
1950	7,955		38.8%
1960	13,101		64.7%
1970	18,802		43.5%
1980	18,527		−1.5%
1990	19,248		3.9%
2000	19,405		0.8%
2010	19,540		0.7%
2020	20,615		5.5%
2022 (est.)	21,794		5.7%
U.S. Decennial Census; 2020 Census

=== 2020 census ===
As of the 2020 census, West St. Paul had a population of 20,615. The median age was 39.4 years. 21.8% of residents were under the age of 18 and 18.3% of residents were 65 years of age or older. For every 100 females there were 90.9 males, and for every 100 females age 18 and over there were 87.9 males age 18 and over.

100.0% of residents lived in urban areas, while 0.0% lived in rural areas.

There were 8,996 households in West St. Paul, of which 25.8% had children under the age of 18 living in them. Of all households, 36.8% were married-couple households, 21.5% were households with a male householder and no spouse or partner present, and 34.3% were households with a female householder and no spouse or partner present. About 37.4% of all households were made up of individuals and 15.2% had someone living alone who was 65 years of age or older.

There were 9,380 housing units, of which 4.1% were vacant. The homeowner vacancy rate was 0.5% and the rental vacancy rate was 4.8%.

Racial composition as of the 2020 census
Race	Number	Percent
White	13,968	67.8%
Black or African American	1,672	8.1%
American Indian and Alaska Native	277	1.3%
Asian	602	2.9%
Native Hawaiian and Other Pacific Islander	16	0.1%
Some other race	1,906	9.2%
Two or more races	2,174	10.5%
Hispanic or Latino (of any race)	4,171	20.2%

=== 2010 census ===
As of the census of 2010, there were 19,540 people, 8,529 households, and 4,751 families living in the city. The population density was 3,979.6 inhabitants per square mile (1,536.5/km^{2}). There were 9,139 housing units at an average density of 1,861.3 per square mile (718.7/km^{2}). The racial makeup of the city was 78.0% White, 6.0% African American, 0.9% Native American, 2.2% Asian, 0.1% Pacific Islander, 8.6% from other races, and 4.3% from two or more races. Hispanic or Latino of any race were 19.5% of the population.

There were 8,529 households, of which 27.2% had children under the age of 18 living with them, 38.8% were married couples living together, 12.3% had a female householder with no husband present, 4.7% had a male householder with no wife present, and 44.3% were non-families. 37.6% of all households were made up of individuals, and 15.1% had someone living alone who was 65 years of age or older. The average household size was 2.25 and the average family size was 3.00.

The median age in the city was 39.7 years. 22.3% of residents were under the age of 18; 7.8% were between the ages of 18 and 24; 26.4% were from 25 to 44; 26.4% were from 45 to 64; and 17% were 65 years of age or older. The gender makeup of the city was 47.6% male and 52.4% female.

=== 2000 census ===
As of the census of 2000, there were 19,405 people, 8,645 households, and 4,875 families living in the city. The population density was 3,874.2 inhabitants per square mile (1,495.8/km^{2}). There were 8,779 housing units at an average density of 1,752.7 per square mile (676.7/km^{2}). The racial makeup of the city was 87.27% White, 2.83% African American, 0.62% Native American, 1.89% Asian, 0.03% Pacific Islander, 4.88% from other races, and 2.49% from two or more races. Hispanic or Latino of any race were 9.98% of the population.

There were 8,645 households, of which 24.6% had children under the age of 18 living with them, 42.4% were married couples living together, 10.7% had a female householder with no husband present, and 43.6% were non-families. 37.1% of all households were made up of individuals, and 15.9% had someone living alone who was 65 years of age or older. The average household size was 2.20 and the average family size was 2.93.

In the city, the population was spread out, with 21.1% under the age of 18, 8.9% from 18 to 24, 28.7% from 25 to 44, 22.1% from 45 to 64, and 19.2% who were 65 years of age or older. The median age was 39 years. For every 100 females, there were 87.3 males. For every 100 females age 18 and over, there were 83.1 males.

The median income for a household in the city was $41,103, and the median income for a family was $56,786. Males had a median income of $39,344 versus $29,836 for females. The per capita income for the city was $23,558. About 3.8% of families and 5.9% of the population were below the poverty line, including 6.6% of those under age 18 and 5.2% of those age 65 or over.

== Economy ==
West St. Paul's major employers include:

- TapeMark, a medical adhesives manufacturer (approx. 300 employees)
- Dakota County Government, the Northern Dakota County Service Center and Courthouse (approx. 500 employees)
- Independent School District 197 (approx. 300 employees)

== Government ==
- Mayor: Dave Napier
- State Senator (Senate District 52): Matthew Klein
- State Representative (House District 52A): Richard J. Hansen
- County Commissioner (Commissioner District 2): Joe Atkins

== Education ==
West St. Paul is inside the West St. Paul-Mendota Heights-Eagan School District, a.k.a. Independent School District 197 public schools, and is home to Moreland Arts and Sciences Magnet School (K-4), Garlough Environmental Magnet School (K-4), Heritage E-Stem Magnet School (grades 5-8), and Two Rivers High School (grades 9-12).

Crown of Life Lutheran (K-8) and St. Croix Lutheran Academy High School (6-12) are two Christian schools of the Wisconsin Evangelical Lutheran Synod in West St. Paul.

St. Joseph's Catholic School (K-8) (of the Archdiocese of Saint Paul and Minneapolis) is in West St. Paul.

The Thomas Irvine Dodge Nature Center's West St. Paul location contains nature preserves and a nature education-based preschool.

== Infrastructure ==
The West St. Paul Police Department is made up of approximately 25 sworn officers, including four sergeants, 21 patrol officers and three part-time non-sworn Community Service Officers.

== Notable people ==
- Tom Gibis, voice actor
- Karl F. Grittner, Minnesota state legislator and educator
- Joan Kroc, philanthropist and wife of McDonald's founder Ray Kroc
- Harold Stassen, former Minnesota governor, presidential candidate, statesman, and university president
- J. Robert Stassen, Minnesota state senator and businessman
