= Minnesota State Highway 3 =

State highway in Minnesota, United States

Trunk Highway 3
- MN 3 highlighted in red

Route information
- Maintained by MnDOT
- Length: 49.130 mi (79.067 km)
- Existed: 1963–present

Major junctions
- South end: MN 21 at Faribault
- MN 19 / MN 246 at Northfield; MN 50 at Farmington; CSAH 42 at Rosemount; MN 149 at Inver Grove Heights; MN 55 at Inver Grove Heights; I-494 at Inver Grove Heights; MN 62 at Inver Grove Heights
- North end: MN 5 in Saint Paul

Location
- Country: United States
- State: Minnesota
- Counties: Rice, Dakota, Ramsey

Highway system
- Minnesota Trunk Highway System; Interstate; US; State; Legislative; Scenic
← US 2	→ MN 4

Minnesota State Highway 3 (MN 3) is a 43.749-mile-long (70.407 km) state highway in Minnesota, which runs from its intersection with MN 21 in Faribault and continues north to its northern terminus at an intersection with MN 5 in downtown Saint Paul. Until the resigning of a previously unsigned highway in 2019, the route's northern terminus was an interchange with MN 62 in Inver Grove Heights.

== Route description ==
MN 3 serves as a north-south route between Saint Paul, West Saint Paul, Inver Grove Heights, Eagan, Rosemount, Farmington, Northfield, and Faribault. The highway is primarily a two-lane highway with paved shoulders in rural areas, with some multiple-lane sections in urban areas.

Beginning at its southern terminus in Faribault at MN 21, MN 3 heads due east along 20th Street NW for about 1 mile, before turning north along 2nd Avenue NW. MN 3 then roughly follows the Cannon River toward Northfield, with gentle curves through alternating wooded areas and open farmland. After passing through the Northfield area, MN 3 travels a primarily straight route through open fields heading toward Farmington. Between Farmington and Rosemount, MN 3 is mostly straight. This portion of the route passes by housing developments, farm fields, and a gravel and sand mining operation. Two roundabouts (at 190th Street W and 170th Street W) are also encountered here. Beyond Rosemount, MN 3 passes through the cities of Eagan and Inver Grove Heights. Here, the highway becomes more curvy and built-up than previous sections. MN 3 parallels a rail line through Eagan, and travelling through Inver Grove Heights, the road passes through a heavily wooded area with many sharp turns. MN 3 then travels through a valley and continues to a junction with MN 55. It continues northbound, passing through rolling, wooded hills over a mostly straight path to its junctions at I-494 and MN 62. In 2018-19, the Minnesota Department of Transportation quietly changed the designation of unsigned MN 952A to MN 3, effectively extending the route north through West Saint Paul along Robert Street into downtown Saint Paul.

Legally, MN 3 is defined as legislative routes 1, 115, and 334 in the Minnesota Statutes. The route is not marked with those numbers.

The maximum speed limit posted on MN 3 is 60 mph. The open stretches of MN 3 from Faribault to 170th Street W near Rosemount generally have a 60 mph limit, with lower limits in the Northfield and Farmington areas. All other sections are posted at 55 mph or lower, particularly through cities and curvier portions of the highway. Speed studies were conducted on the highway in 2015 on the Northfield to Eagan section, and in 2018 on the Faribault to Northfield section. The studies authorized a new maximum allowed speed limit of 60 mph from Faribault to the south end of Rosemount.

== History ==
MN 3 was established in 1963, from the southern portion of former MN 218. This route was originally numbered 65 as part of old U.S. Highway 65 (US 65) from 1927 to 1934. It was built between Faribault and MN 149 in Inver Grove Heights and was paved as early as 1929.

The route was renumbered 218 in 1934 as part of old US 218 from 1934 to 1935, which was eventually redesignated MN 218 from 1935 to 1963. The route was renumbered MN 3 in 1963.

The route was once part of the Jefferson Highway, an automobile highway stretching through the central U.S. until the late 1920s. MN 3 is still part of unmarked Constitutional Route 1.

From the late 1970s to 1994, MN 3 was previously routed on the Lafayette Freeway through South St. Paul / West St. Paul to downtown Saint Paul. Nearby US 52 was routed on a stretch of Robert Street during this period of time. The Lafayette Freeway was completely constructed in 1994, US 52 was then rerouted along that route and MN 3 was shortened to a northern terminus at its junction with MN 62 in Inver Grove Heights. Recently MnDOT has indicated it considers the stretch of Robert Street from downtown St. Paul through West St. Paul to be Highway 3, and has recently signed the road in West St. Paul with Minnesota Highway 3 shields and reflects the roadway as MN-3 on their project web pages.

The section from MN 5 to near Kellogg Boulevard East in St. Paul is scheduled for turnback, as this section of the legislative route is being removed.

== Major intersections ==
County	Location	mi	km	Destinations	Notes
Rice	Faribault	0.000	0.000	MN 21 (Lyndale Avenue) – Faribault, Minneapolis	
Rice	Faribault	1.018	1.638	2nd Avenue	Formerly US 65 / MN 218 south
Rice	Northfield	12.299	19.793	MN 246 east (Woodley Street) – Nerstrand	
Rice	Northfield	12.766	20.545	MN 19 west (5th Street) to I-35	South end of MN 19 overlap
Rice	Northfield	13.036	20.979	MN 19 east (2nd Street)	North end of MN 19 overlap
Dakota	Farmington	25.357	40.808	MN 50 east (Ash Street) / CSAH 74 – Hampton	
Dakota	Farmington	26.015	41.867	CSAH 50 west (Elm Street) – Lakeville	Formerly MN 50 west; previously US 65 north
Dakota	Inver Grove Heights	38.332	61.689	MN 149 north (Jefferson Trail)	
Dakota	Inver Grove Heights	40.642– 40.787	65.407– 65.640	MN 55 (Courthouse Boulevard)	Interchange
Dakota	Inver Grove Heights–Sunfish Lake line	43.375– 43.550	69.805– 70.087	I-494 west	Interchange; Exit 67 (I-494)
Dakota	Inver Grove Heights–Sunfish Lake line	43.735– 43.741	70.385– 70.394	MN 62 (Crosstown Highway)	Previously MN 110; interchange access to I-494 east
Ramsey	Saint Paul	47.495	76.436	Cesar Chavez Street	Formerly MN 56 / MN 218 north
Ramsey	Saint Paul	48.596	78.208	Kellogg Boulevard	Formerly MN 5
Ramsey	Saint Paul	48.926	78.739	MN 5 (7th Street)	Formerly continued north as unmarked MN 952A; North of Interstate 94 and Interstate 35E roadway continues as CSAH 34 to University Avenue
1.000 mi = 1.609 km; 1.000 km = 0.621 mi: Concurrency terminus
