= Sciota Township, Dakota County, Minnesota =

Township in Minnesota, United States

Sciota Township
- Township
- Location within the state of Minnesota Sciota Township (the United States)
- Coordinates: 44°30′10″N 93°3′34″W
- Country: United States
- State: Minnesota
- County: Dakota

Area
  - Total: 14.9 sq mi (38.7 km^{2})
  - Land: 14.9 sq mi (38.7 km^{2})
  - Water: 0 sq mi (0.0 km^{2})
- Elevation: 890 ft (270 m)

Population (2020)
  - Total: 460
  - Density: 31/sq mi (11.9/km^{2})
- Time zone: UTC-6 (Central (CST))
  - Summer (DST): UTC-5 (CDT)
- Area code: 507
- FIPS code: 27-59008
- GNIS feature ID: 0665569

Sciota Township is a township in Dakota County, Minnesota, United States. The population was 460 at the 2020 census. The ghost town of Lewiston was located in the township.

== History ==
Sciota Township was organized in 1858, and named after a place in Ohio.

== Geography ==
According to the United States Census Bureau, the township has a total area of 15.0 square miles (38.7 km^{2}), all land.

== Demographics ==
Historical population
Census	Pop.	Note	%±
1860	255		—
1870	328		28.6%
1880	276		−15.9%
1890	239		−13.4%
1900	247		3.3%
1910	254		2.8%
1920	246		−3.1%
1930	288		17.1%
1940	249		−13.5%
1950	217		−12.9%
1960	213		−1.8%
1970	213		0.0%
1980	242		13.6%
1990	252		4.1%
2000	285		13.1%
2010	414		45.3%
2020	460		11.1%
U.S. Decennial Census

As of the census of 2000, there were 285 people, 92 households, and 75 families residing in the township. The population density was 19.1 people per square mile (7.4/km^{2}). There were 93 housing units at an average density of 6.2/sq mi (2.4/km^{2}). The racial makeup of the township was 97.54% White, 0.70% Native American, 0.35% Asian, 1.40% from other races.

There were 92 households, out of which 41.3% had children under the age of 18 living with them, 78.3% were married couples living together, 2.2% had a female householder with no husband present, and 17.4% were non-families. 9.8% of all households were made up of individuals, and 3.3% had someone living alone who was 65 years of age or older. The average household size was 3.10 and the average family size was 3.38.

In the township the population was spread out, with 31.6% under the age of 18, 4.9% from 18 to 24, 33.3% from 25 to 44, 23.2% from 45 to 64, and 7.0% who were 65 years of age or older. The median age was 35 years. For every 100 females, there were 106.5 males. For every 100 females age 18 and over, there were 107.4 males.

The median income for a household in the township was $63,125, and the median income for a family was $66,750. Males had a median income of $45,536 versus $27,292 for females. The per capita income for the township was $23,181. About 6.0% of families and 9.5% of the population were below the poverty line, including 6.0% of those under the age of eighteen and 24.0% of those sixty five or over.
