= Prairie Creek Community School =

Coordinates: 44°32′54.7″N 93°09′26.9″W

Information
- School type: Charter school
- Established: 1982; 44 years ago
- Grades: Kindergarten - Grade 5
- Enrollment: 180

Prairie Creek Community School is a K-5, tuition-free, progressive charter school located in Castle Rock Township, Minnesota, United States. Established in 1982, Prairie Creek was founded by a small group of individuals and educators. Prairie Creek Community School became a public charter school in 2002.

Director

Prairie Creek Community School is directed by Simon Tyler.

== Student population ==
Prairie Creek Community School has 180 K-5 students in its student body.
