= Empire, Minnesota =

City in Minnesota, United States

Empire
- City
- View from the Lone Rock trail within the then-Empire Township

- Location within the state of Minnesota Empire (the United States)
- Coordinates: 44°40′44″N 93°5′45″W
- Country: United States
- State: Minnesota
- County: Dakota
- Organized: 1858 (township)
- Incorporated: February 28, 2023 (city)

Government
  - Mayor: Melanie Lee

Area
  - Total: 33.7 sq mi (87.4 km^{2})
  - Land: 33.7 sq mi (87.4 km^{2})
  - Water: 0 sq mi (0.0 km^{2})
- Elevation: 869 ft (265 m)

Population (2020)
  - Total: 3,177
  - Density: 94/sq mi (36.4/km^{2})
- Time zone: UTC-6 (Central (CST))
  - Summer (DST): UTC-5 (CDT)
- FIPS code: 27-19376
- GNIS feature ID: 0664099
- Website: https://empiremn.gov/

Empire is a city in Dakota County, Minnesota. The population was 3,177 at the 2020 census. It is part of the Minneapolis-St. Paul metropolitan area.

== History ==
Empire Township was organized in 1858, and named after New York, the Empire State.

The township voted to incorporate as the city of Empire on February 14, 2023, and that took effect on February 28 after elections of local officials. The city does not anticipate changes but wished to establish its borders to prevent the nearby, rapidly growing cities of Lakeville, Rosemount and Farmington from annexing new developments.

== Geography ==
According to the United States Census Bureau, the city has a total area of 33.8 square miles (88 km^{2}), all land.

== Demographics ==
Historical population
Census	Pop.	Note	%±
1860	80		—
1870	995		1,143.8%
1880	608		−38.9%
1890	482		−20.7%
1900	467		−3.1%
1910	456		−2.4%
1920	646		41.7%
1930	565		−12.5%
1940	559		−1.1%
1950	473		−15.4%
1960	714		51.0%
1970	1,136		59.1%
1980	1,224		7.7%
1990	1,340		9.5%
2000	1,638		22.2%
2010	2,444		49.2%
2020	3,177		30.0%
U.S. Decennial Census

As of the census of 2000, there were 1,638 people, 515 households, and 431 families residing in the township. The population density was 48.5 inhabitants per square mile (18.7/km^{2}). There were 524 housing units at an average density of 15.5 per square mile (6.0/km^{2}). The racial makeup of the township was 96.58% White, 0.18% African American, 0.31% Native American, 1.89% Asian, 0.61% from other races, and 0.43% from two or more races. Hispanic or Latino of any race were 0.92% of the population.

There were 515 households, out of which 49.7% had children under the age of 18 living with them, 73.2% were married couples living together, 7.2% had a female householder with no husband present, and 16.3% were non-families. 11.7% of all households were made up of individuals, and 3.1% had someone living alone who was 65 years of age or older. The average household size was 3.17 and the average family size was 3.43.

In the township the population was spread out, with 33.5% under the age of 18, 7.3% from 18 to 24, 34.7% from 25 to 44, 18.5% from 45 to 64, and 6.0% who were 65 years of age or older. The median age was 32 years. For every 100 females, there were 104.5 males. For every 100 females age 18 and over, there were 105.1 males.

The median income for a household in the township was $68,500, and the median income for a family was $68,250. Males had a median income of $39,919 versus $31,250 for females. The per capita income for the township was $21,802. About 4.5% of families and 6.6% of the population were below the poverty line, including 13.7% of those under age 18 and 5.1% of those age 65 or over.
