= Minnesota State Highway 62 (Hennepin–Dakota counties) =

Eastern highway in Minnesota

Trunk Highway 62
- Crosstown Highway
- MN 62 highlighted in red

Route information
- Maintained by MnDOT
- Length: 18.599 mi (29.932 km)
- Existed: 1988–present

Major junctions
- West end: I-494 / CR 62 at Eden Prairie
- US 169 / US 212 at Eden Prairie; MN 100 at Edina; I-35W / MN 121 at Richfield; MN 77 / CR 152 at Minneapolis; MN 5 at Fort Snelling; MN 55 at Mendota Heights; MN 13 at Mendota Heights; I-35E at Mendota Heights; MN 149 at Mendota Heights; MN 3 at Inver Grove Heights
- East end: I-494 / US 52 at Inver Grove Heights

Location
- Country: United States
- State: Minnesota
- Counties: Hennepin, Dakota

Highway system
- Minnesota Trunk Highway System; Interstate; US; State; Legislative; Scenic
← MN 62	→ US 63

Minnesota State Highway 62 (MN 62) is a highway in the Twin Cities region of Minnesota. The route was part of County Road 62 (CR 62) until 1988, when a portion of the route was inherited by the state. The western terminus of the highway is at Interstate 494 (I-494) in Eden Prairie, where the roadway continues west as CR 62 to CR 101. The eastern terminus of the route is at the junction with I-494 in Inver Grove Heights. Locally, the original portion of the route in Hennepin County is known as "the Crosstown Highway" or simply "the Crosstown," though signage with this name does not appear on the highway itself, but only on local streets adjacent to the road. It is also used as an alternate name, even by the Minnesota Department of Transportation (MnDOT). The route is 18.6 miles (29.9 km) in length.

== Route description ==
MN 62 serves as an east–west route between Eden Prairie, Minnetonka, Edina, Richfield, Minneapolis, Fort Snelling, Mendota Heights and Inver Grove Heights. The route is constructed to freeway standards for most of its length, except for the western 1/2 mile (0.80 km), which is an expressway with two signal-controlled intersections. The eastern section is also an expressway except for the last mile between Mendota Road and I-494, which is again a freeway. The route is located in Hennepin and Dakota counties.

Due to the existence of a second State Highway 62 in the southwest corner of the state between Fulda and Windom, the stretch of MN 62 in the Twin Cities area starts its numbering at milepost 100. This is unorthodox in that the two state highways have a combined length of 36 miles (58 km). "Mile 100" is calibrated where CR 101 and CR 62 meet at the Eden Prairie–Minnetonka boundary line; though the mileposts themselves, starting with mile 104, do not appear until the state-maintained section inside the I-494 beltway.

== History ==
MN 62 in the Twin Cities area was authorized in 1988. Prior to 1988, the route was designated as Hennepin County Road 62. The route was built mostly in the late 1960s by Hennepin County.

The original Hennepin County numbering of 62 corresponded with 62nd Street in Minneapolis. However, some portions of MN 62 do stray from the 62nd Street plane, as near the MSP airport, MN 62 runs along the plane of 58th Street.

MN 62 previously had a traffic light at its eastern terminus at MN 55 until an interchange was reconstructed during construction of the METRO Blue Line light rail in 2004.

=== I-35W and Highway 62 Crosstown Commons reconstruction project ===
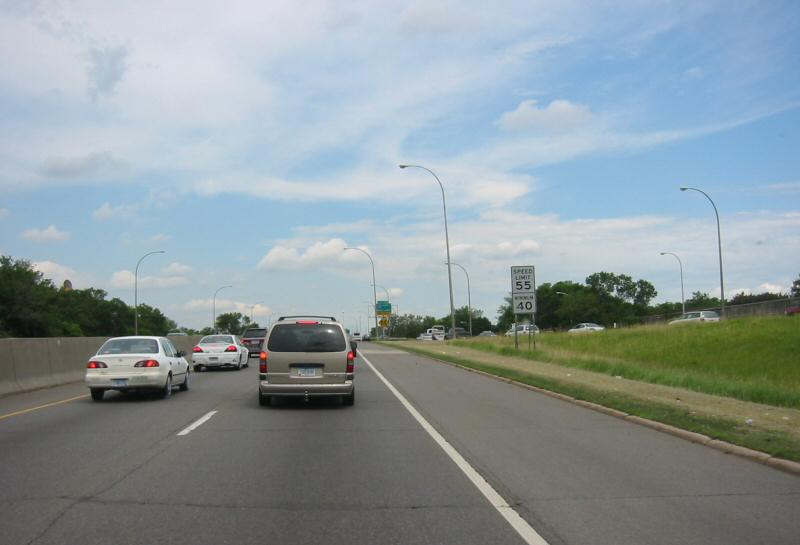
A typical traffic jam, before reconstruction, in the Crosstown Commons. The atypical part was that this picture was taken on a Saturday afternoon, not during a Monday thru Friday rush hour.

The Twin Cities' MN 62 had one of the most notorious junctions in the region where it interwove with I-35W. This mile-long stretch was known informally as the "Crosstown Commons". Plans to "unweave" and expand this section of roadway to improve traffic flow had come and gone for many years, frustrating the 200,000 drivers who used it daily. Construction of the current design was expected to begin in July 2006, but was delayed due to state budget deficits.

The project was adequately funded during Governor Tim Pawlenty's second term and bids were received in April 2007. The bid was won by the Ames, Lunda, and Schafer consortium for $288 million. Construction began in May 2007. The project included 25 new bridges, 63 lane-miles of highway, and expanded the total roadway width from 6 lanes to 12 lanes at Lyndale Avenue. The bridges were cast in Coates, Minnesota, and trucked in for on-site erection. The new design includes transit/HOV lanes and was completed in November 2010. The new interchange features three through-lanes for I-35W (including one HOV lane) in each direction and two separate through-lanes for MN 62 in each direction, eliminating the need to weave across traffic. The 2007 cost of correcting the deficiencies in that short stretch of highway was estimated to be $285 million.

=== Extension ===
In August 2018, the MN 62 designation was extended from its former eastern terminus at MN 55 near the Mendota Bridge to a new terminus at I-494 in the city of Inver Grove Heights. This new extension is cosigned as MN 55/MN 62 across the Mendota Bridge. Beyond the bridge, MN 62 replaces the former MN 110 in its entirety to I-494. This project has been designated "One route. One name" by MnDOT. The reason for the change was to assign a single highway number to this continuous route as opposed to the three different highway numbers (MN 62, MN 55, MN 110) that the route formerly had. MnDOT believes this will lessen the potential for motorist confusion. Now MN 62 in the Twin Cities area both originates and terminates at I-494, travelling across Hennepin and Dakota counties.

== Exit list ==
Some exits have been numbered.

County	Location	mi	km	Exit	Destinations	Notes
Hennepin	Eden Prairie–Minnetonka line	103.592	166.715	—	I-494 / CSAH 62 west (62nd Street)	At-grade intersection; western terminus; road continues as CSAH 62 (62nd Street)
Hennepin	Eden Prairie–Minnetonka line	104.727	168.542	104	CSAH 61 (Shady Oak Road)	
Hennepin	Eden Prairie–Edina line	105.867	170.376	105	US 169	Cloverleaf interchange; signed as exit 105A (SB) and exit 105B (NB)
Hennepin	Eden Prairie–Edina line	106.354	171.160	106A	US 212 west	Westbound exit and eastbound entrance
Hennepin	Edina	106.473	171.352	106B	CSAH 158 (Gleason Road)	Signed as exit 106 eastbound
Hennepin	Edina	107.369	172.794	107	Tracy Avenue	
Hennepin	Edina	108.342	174.360	108	MN 100	Cloverleaf interchange; signed as exit 108A (SB) and 108B (NB)
Hennepin	Edina	109.183	175.713	109A	Valley View Road	Eastbound exit and westbound entrance
Hennepin	Edina	109.422	176.098	109B	CR 17 (France Avenue)	Signed as exit 109 westbound
Hennepin	Edina–Richfield– Minneapolis tripoint	110.002	177.031	110A	CR 31 (Xerxes Avenue)	
Hennepin	Richfield–Minneapolis line	110.502	177.836	110B	CR 32 (Penn Avenue)	
Hennepin	Richfield–Minneapolis line	111.278	179.085	111A	I-35W south – Albert Lea	I-35W exit 11; westbound entrance from I-35W NB includes direct entrance ramp from MN 121
Hennepin	Richfield–Minneapolis line	111.538	179.503		Lyndale Avenue	
Hennepin	Richfield–Minneapolis line	111.6	179.6	112A	I-35W north – Minneapolis	I-35W exit 11
Hennepin	Richfield–Minneapolis line	112.512	181.071		CR 35 (Portland Avenue)	No westbound entrance
Hennepin	Minneapolis	113.322	182.374		Bloomington Avenue	Eastbound exit and entrance
Hennepin	Minneapolis	113.642	182.889		MN 77 south / CR 152 north (Cedar Avenue)	
Hennepin	Minneapolis	114.367	184.056		CSAH 54 north (28th Avenue)	
Hennepin	Minneapolis	114.842	184.820		34th Avenue	
Hennepin	Unorganized Territory of Fort Snelling	115.982	186.655	115	MN 55 west (Hiawatha Avenue) / Great River Road (National Route) / Minnehaha Avenue / Federal Drive	Former eastern terminus of MN 62; Federal Drive not signed; western end of Great River Road overlap; access to Minneapolis Veterans Affairs Health Care System and VA Medical Center Station (Blue Line)
Hennepin	Unorganized Territory of Fort Snelling	116.293	187.155	116A	Bloomington Road – Fort Snelling Historic Site	Ft. Snelling not signed eastbound
Hennepin	Unorganized Territory of Fort Snelling	116.454	187.415	116B/C	MN 5 – Minneapolis–Saint Paul International Airport, St. Paul	
Minnesota River		116.479– 116.869	187.455– 188.082	Mendota Bridge		
Dakota	Mendota Heights	116.946	188.206	117	MN 55 east	Eastbound exit and westbound entrance
Dakota	Mendota Heights	117.333	188.829		MN 13 east / Great River Road (National Route) – MN 55	Eastern end of Great River Road overlap, at-grade intersection
Dakota	Mendota Heights	118.442	190.614		I-35E – St. Paul, Albert Lea	I-35E north exit 101, south exits 101A-B; interchange
Dakota	Mendota Heights	119.113	191.694		MN 149 (Dodd Road)	At-grade intersection
Dakota	Inver Grove Heights	121.416	195.400		MN 3 (South Robert Trail)	Interchange
Dakota	Inver Grove Heights	122.191	196.647		I-494 / US 52 – St. Paul, Rochester	I-494 exit 67; eastbound exit and westbound entrance
1.000 mi = 1.609 km; 1.000 km = 0.621 mi: Incomplete access
