= Hampton Township, Dakota County, Minnesota =

Township in Minnesota, United States

Hampton Township
- Township
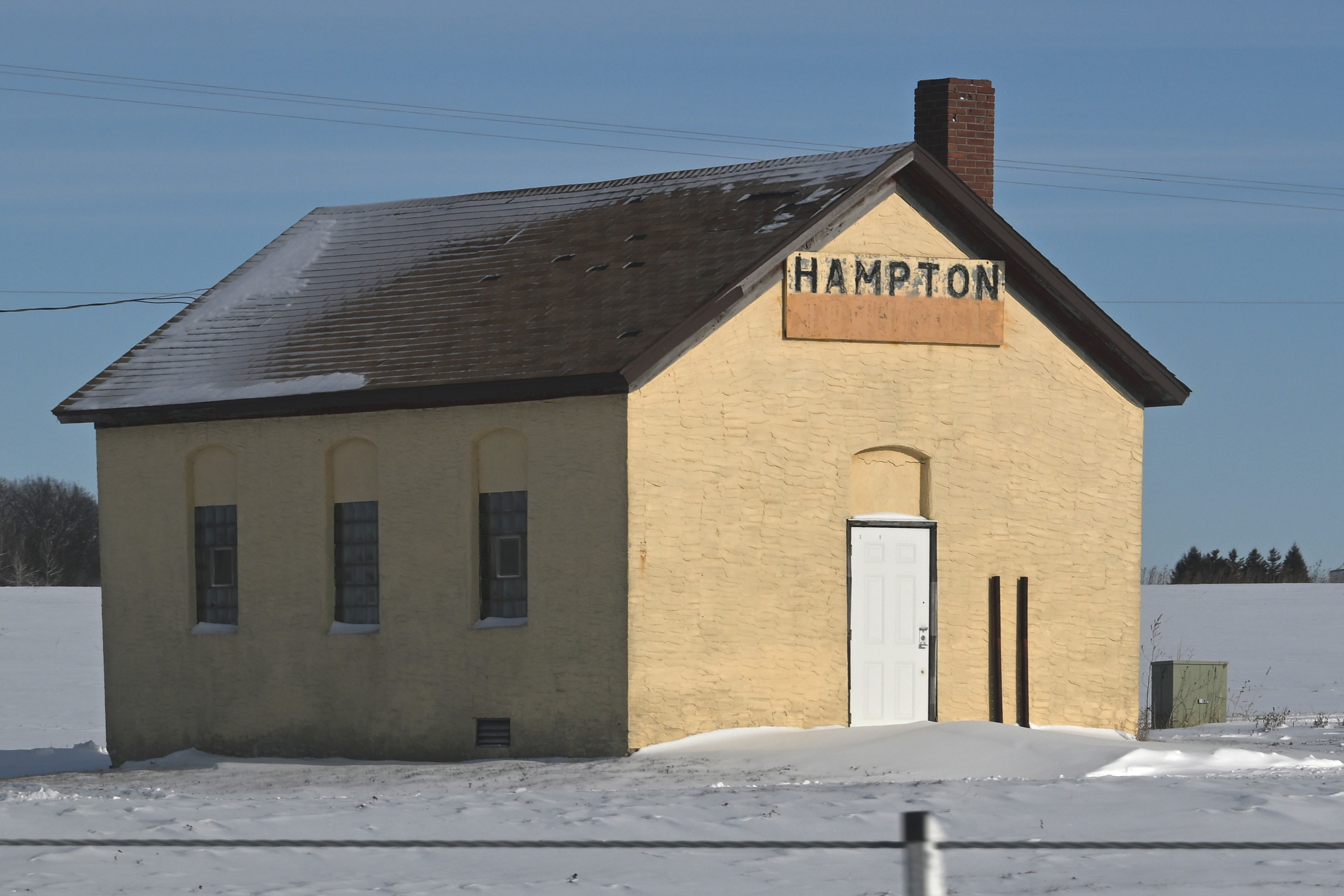
- The former township hall

- Location within the state of Minnesota Hampton Township (the United States)
- Coordinates: 44°36′9″N 92°59′17″W
- Country: United States
- State: Minnesota
- County: Dakota

Area
  - Total: 34.3 sq mi (88.8 km^{2})
  - Land: 34.3 sq mi (88.8 km^{2})
  - Water: 0 sq mi (0.0 km^{2})
- Elevation: 1,001 ft (305 m)

Population (2020)
  - Total: 832
  - Density: 24/sq mi (9.4/km^{2})
- Time zone: UTC-6 (Central (CST))
  - Summer (DST): UTC-5 (CDT)
- ZIP code: 55031
- Area codes: 651 and 507
- FIPS code: 27-26882
- GNIS feature ID: 0664386
- Website: https://www.hamptontwp.com/

Hampton Township is a township in Dakota County, Minnesota, United States. The population was 832 at the 2020 census.

Hampton Township was organized in 1858, and named after Hampton, Connecticut, the birthplace of an early settler.

== Geography ==
According to the United States Census Bureau, the township has a total area of 34.3 square miles (89 km^{2}), all land.

The city of Hampton and the city of New Trier are both geographically within Hampton Township but are a separate entities.

== Demographics ==
Historical population
Census	Pop.	Note	%±
1860	475		—
1870	930		95.8%
1880	805		−13.4%
1890	725		−9.9%
1900	604		−16.7%
1910	625		3.5%
1920	578		−7.5%
1930	518		−10.4%
1940	531		2.5%
1950	512		−3.6%
1960	511		−0.2%
1970	595		16.4%
1980	848		42.5%
1990	866		2.1%
2000	986		13.9%
2010	903		−8.4%
2020	832		−7.9%
U.S. Decennial Census

As of the census of 2000, there were 986 people, 320 households, and 261 families residing in the township. The population density was 28.8 inhabitants per square mile (11.1/km^{2}). There were 322 housing units at an average density of 9.4 per square mile (3.6/km^{2}). The racial makeup of the township was 98.78% White, 0.20% African American, 0.61% Native American, 0.20% Asian, and 0.20% from two or more races.

There were 320 households, out of which 43.8% had children under the age of 18 living with them, 75.9% were married couples living together, 3.1% had a female householder with no husband present, and 18.4% were non-families. 12.5% of all households were made up of individuals, and 3.1% had someone living alone who was 65 years of age or older. The average household size was 3.08 and the average family size was 3.42.

In the township the population was spread out, with 32.2% under the age of 18, 7.2% from 18 to 24, 30.5% from 25 to 44, 22.1% from 45 to 64, and 8.0% who were 65 years of age or older. The median age was 36 years. For every 100 females, there were 105.8 males. For every 100 females age 18 and over, there were 102.7 males.

The median income for a household in the township was $62,292, and the median income for a family was $68,750. Males had a median income of $46,500 versus $31,023 for females. The per capita income for the township was $25,576. About 0.8% of families and 2.2% of the population were below the poverty line, including 1.6% of those under age 18 and 2.4% of those age 65 or over.
