= Castle Rock Township, Dakota County, Minnesota =

Township in Minnesota, United States

Castle Rock Township
- Township
- Location within the state of Minnesota Castle Rock Township (the United States)
- Coordinates: 44°34′48″N 93°6′21″W
- Country: United States
- State: Minnesota
- County: Dakota

Area
  - Total: 35.8 sq mi (92.6 km^{2})
  - Land: 35.8 sq mi (92.6 km^{2})
  - Water: 0 sq mi (0.0 km^{2})
- Elevation: 928 ft (283 m)

Population (2020)
  - Total: 1,350
  - Density: 38/sq mi (14.6/km^{2})
- Time zone: UTC-6 (Central (CST))
  - Summer (DST): UTC-5 (CDT)
- ZIP code: 55010
- Area code: 651
- FIPS code: 27-10306
- GNIS feature ID: 0663763
- Website: www.CastleRockTownship.com

Castle Rock Township is a township in Dakota County, Minnesota, United States. The population was 1,350 at the 2020 census.

== History ==
Castle Rock Township was organized in 1858, and named for a nearby rock formation.

== Geography ==
According to the United States Census Bureau, the township has a total area of 35.8 square miles (93 km^{2}), all land.

== Education ==
The township is served by the following districts and schools:

- Farmington School District
- Randolph School District
- Northfield School District
- Prairie Creek Community School

== Demographics ==
Historical population
Census	Pop.	Note	%±
1860	399		—
1870	703		76.2%
1880	706		0.4%
1890	704		−0.3%
1900	681		−3.3%
1910	632		−7.2%
1920	691		9.3%
1930	691		0.0%
1940	742		7.4%
1950	716		−3.5%
1960	1,031		44.0%
1970	1,235		19.8%
1980	1,340		8.5%
1990	1,480		10.4%
2000	1,495		1.0%
2010	1,342		−10.2%
2020	1,350		0.6%
U.S. Decennial Census

As of the census of 2000, there were 1,495 people, 514 households, and 415 families residing in the township. The population density was 41.8 inhabitants per square mile (16.1/km^{2}). There were 518 housing units at an average density of 14.5 per square mile (5.6/km^{2}). The racial makeup of the township was 98.19% White, 0.20% African American, 0.27% Asian, 0.40% from other races, and 0.94% from two or more races. Hispanic or Latino of any race were 0.54% of the population.

There were 514 households, out of which 40.7% had children under the age of 18 living with them, 72.0% were married couples living together, 5.6% had a female householder with no husband present, and 19.1% were non-families. 14.2% of all households were made up of individuals, and 4.7% had someone living alone who was 65 years of age or older. The average household size was 2.90 and the average family size was 3.22.

In the township the population was spread out, with 27.4% under the age of 18, 8.0% from 18 to 24, 28.3% from 25 to 44, 28.4% from 45 to 64, and 8.0% who were 65 years of age or older. The median age was 38 years. For every 100 females, there were 108.5 males. For every 100 females age 18 and over, there were 103.8 males.

The median income for a household in the township was $59,479, and the median income for a family was $64,000. Males had a median income of $42,500 versus $28,000 for females. The per capita income for the township was $23,334. About 4.5% of families and 5.3% of the population were below the poverty line, including 6.6% of those under age 18 and 5.8% of those age 65 or over.
