= Hampton, Minnesota =

City in Minnesota, United States

Hampton
- City
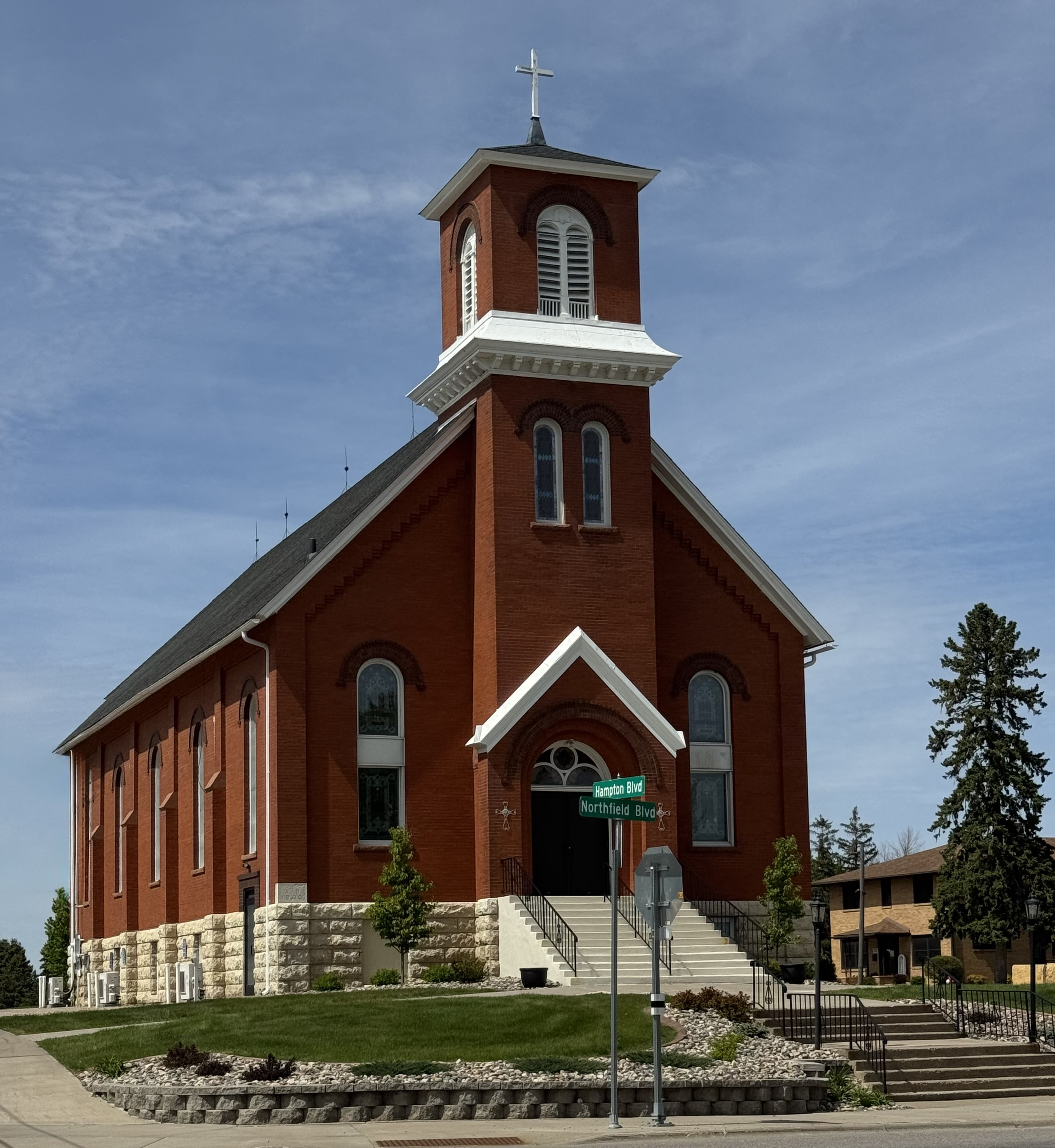
- St. Mathias Roman Catholic Church in Hampton

- Location of the city of Hampton within Dakota County, Minnesota
- Coordinates: 44°36′35″N 92°59′51″W
- Country: United States
- State: Minnesota
- County: Dakota

Area
  - Total: 1.24 sq mi (3.21 km^{2})
  - Land: 1.23 sq mi (3.19 km^{2})
  - Water: 0.0077 sq mi (0.02 km^{2})
- Elevation: 991 ft (302 m)

Population (2020)
  - Total: 744
  - Density: 604.6/sq mi (233.44/km^{2})
- Time zone: UTC-6 (Central (CST))
  - Summer (DST): UTC-5 (CDT)
- ZIP code: 55031
- Area code: 651
- FIPS code: 27-26864
- GNIS feature ID: 0644612
- Website: https://cityofhamptonmn.gov/

Hampton is a city in Dakota County, Minnesota, United States. As of the 2020 census, Hampton had a population of 744.

== History ==
A post office called Hampton has been in operation since 1856. The city took its name from Hampton Township.

== Geography ==
According to the United States Census Bureau, the city has a total area of 1.36 square miles (3.52 km^{2}), of which 1.35 square miles (3.50 km^{2}) is land and 0.01 square miles (0.03 km^{2}) is water.

Main routes in the community include U.S. Highway 52; State Highways 50 and 56; County Road 47 and County Road 78.

The city of Hampton is within Hampton Township geographically but is a separate entity.

== Demographics ==
Historical population
Census	Pop.	Note	%±
1900	196		—
1910	190		−3.1%
1920	246		29.5%
1930	196		−20.3%
1940	224		14.3%
1950	275		22.8%
1960	305		10.9%
1970	369		21.0%
1980	299		−19.0%
1990	363		21.4%
2000	434		19.6%
2010	689		58.8%
2020	744		8.0%
U.S. Decennial Census

=== 2010 census ===
As of the census of 2010, there were 689 people, 245 households, and 175 families living in the city. The population density was 510.4 inhabitants per square mile (197.1/km^{2}). There were 268 housing units at an average density of 198.5 per square mile (76.6/km^{2}). The racial makeup of the city was 95.6% White, 1.0% African American, 0.3% Native American, 0.6% Asian, 0.4% from other races, and 2.0% from two or more races. Hispanic or Latino of any race were 2.3% of the population.

There were 245 households, of which 41.6% had children under the age of 18 living with them, 58.0% were married couples living together, 7.8% had a female householder with no husband present, 5.7% had a male householder with no wife present, and 28.6% were non-families. 19.6% of all households were made up of individuals, and 5.8% had someone living alone who was 65 years of age or older. The average household size was 2.81 and the average family size was 3.27.

The median age in the city was 30.6 years. 29.9% of residents were under the age of 18; 8.7% were between the ages of 18 and 24; 35.1% were from 25 to 44; 20.4% were from 45 to 64; and 5.8% were 65 years of age or older. The gender makeup of the city was 53.4% male and 46.6% female.

=== 2000 census ===
As of the census of 2000, there were 434 people, 156 households, and 109 families living in the city. The population density was 323.2 inhabitants per square mile (124.8/km^{2}). There were 159 housing units at an average density of 118.4 per square mile (45.7/km^{2}). The racial makeup of the city was 98.85% White, 0.23% African American, 0.23% from other races, and 0.69% from two or more races. Hispanic or Latino of any race were 0.92% of the population.

There were 156 households, out of which 39.7% had children under the age of 18 living with them, 58.3% were married couples living together, 5.8% had a female householder with no husband present, and 30.1% were non-families. 23.1% of all households were made up of individuals, and 10.3% had someone living alone who was 65 years of age or older. The average household size was 2.78 and the average family size was 3.36.

In the city, the population was spread out, with 33.6% under the age of 18, 6.9% from 18 to 24, 35.9% from 25 to 44, 13.8% from 45 to 64, and 9.7% who were 65 years of age or older. The median age was 31 years. For every 100 females, there were 99.1 males. For every 100 females age 18 and over, there were 104.3 males.

The median income for a household in the city was $53,438, and the median income for a family was $56,528. Males had a median income of $41,786 versus $26,172 for females. The per capita income for the city was $17,121. About 3.2% of families and 5.8% of the population were below the poverty line, including 5.7% of those under age 18 and 17.6% of those age 65 or over.
