= Simley Wrestling =

The Simley High School wrestling team, located in Inver Grove Heights, Minnesota, has been ranked nationally in the top twenty-five for seven of the last ten years. The Scholastic wrestling program was founded by teacher Jim Short. The program was able to secure its first state title within seven years. The following year, in 1978, Jim Trudeau won the school's first individual state title. In 1987, the team earned its first state championship.

== Coaches ==
Jim Short ran the program from its inception in 1970 until 1998, when his son, Will Short, a former All-American wrestler at the University of Minnesota, replaced him. Jim returned as an Assistant Coach in 2009. The two were named "Co-head Coaches of the Year" for the 2009-10 season. In 1990, Jim was named to the Minnesota wrestling Hall of Fame. Several college wrestlers joined the Shorts to complete the staff.

- Brett Lawrence – Former All-American at the University of Minnesota
- Tim Hartung – Former 3x All-American and 2x national champion at the University of Minnesota
- Cole Konrad – Former 4x All-American and 2x national champion at the University of Minnesota
- Mark Madigan – 2012 Minnesota and National assistant coach of the year
- Dan Glenn – Former 3x All-American at the University of Iowa

== State Tournament ==
=== Team ===
- 16-time Minnesota State Tournament Entrant
- 11-time Minnesota State Champion, in 1987, 1988, 1989, 1992, 2008, 2009, 2010, 2011 & 2012, 2014, 2015
- 6-time Minnesota State Runner-Up, in 1991, 1994, 1995, 2003, 2005 & 2013
- 2-time State Third Place, 1993 & 2002

=== Individual ===
- 40 – Champions
- 34 – Runners-up
- 19 – 3rd Place
- 21 – 4th Place
- 19 – 5th Place
- 14 – 6th Place

==== Winners ====
- Mack Short (2014)
- Jake Short (2010, 2011, 2012, 2013)
- Nick Wanzek (2011, 2012, 2013)
- Kyle Gliva (2011, 2012, 2013)
- Chris Short (1986, 1987)
- Will Short (1988, 1989)
- Wade Short (1990, 1991)
- George Lynaugh (2002, 2003)
- Mitch Millner (2004, 2005)
- Jim Trudeau (1978)
- John Short (1985)
- Derek Jones (1987)
- Dan Harrison (1988)
- Dan Dietrich (1991)
- Tony Dionosopulus (1994)
- Jeff Schroeder (1994)
- Victor Dionosopulus (1995)
- Anthony Jackson (1995)
- Jake Skalicky (1997)
- Mike Verdeja (2000)
- Kyle Anderson (2003)
- John Brandtjen (2006)
- Mic Berg (2009)
- Tommy Glenn (2010)
- Kurtis Julson (2010)
- Pedro Delao (2011)
- Juan Torres (2012)
- Micah Barnes (2012)
