= Regina Barr =

American politician

Member of the Minnesota House of Representatives from the 52B district
- In office January 3, 2017 – January 7, 2019
- Preceded by: Joe Atkins
- Succeeded by: Ruth Richardson

Personal details
- Born: February 17, 1965 (age 61)
- Party: Republican Party of Minnesota
- Spouse: Kevin
- Education: Adelphi University; Saint Mary's University of Minnesota
- Occupation: consultant

Regina Barr (born February 17, 1965) is an American politician and former member of the Minnesota House of Representatives. A member of the Republican Party of Minnesota, she represented District 52B in the southeastern Twin Cities metropolitan area.

== Early life, education, and career ==
Barr was born on February 17, 1965. She was raised by a single mother of four children. Barr attended Adelphi University, graduating with a Bachelor of Business Administration in finance and later a Master of Business Administration in marketing. She also attended Saint Mary's University of Minnesota, graduating with a Master of Arts in human development.

Barr founded Red Ladder, a corporate consulting and executive coaching firm, in 2003. She has served on the boards of the Breast Cancer Education Association and Minnesota Excellence in Public Service.

Barr has announced her intention to challenge one-term incumbent DFL congresswoman Angie Craig in Minnesota's 2nd congressional district for the upcoming 2020 House of Representatives election.

== Minnesota House of Representatives ==
Barr was first elected to the Minnesota House of Representatives in 2016.

== Personal life ==
Barr and her husband, Kevin, reside in Inver Grove Heights, Minnesota.
