= Ruth Richardson (American politician) =

American politician (born 1976)

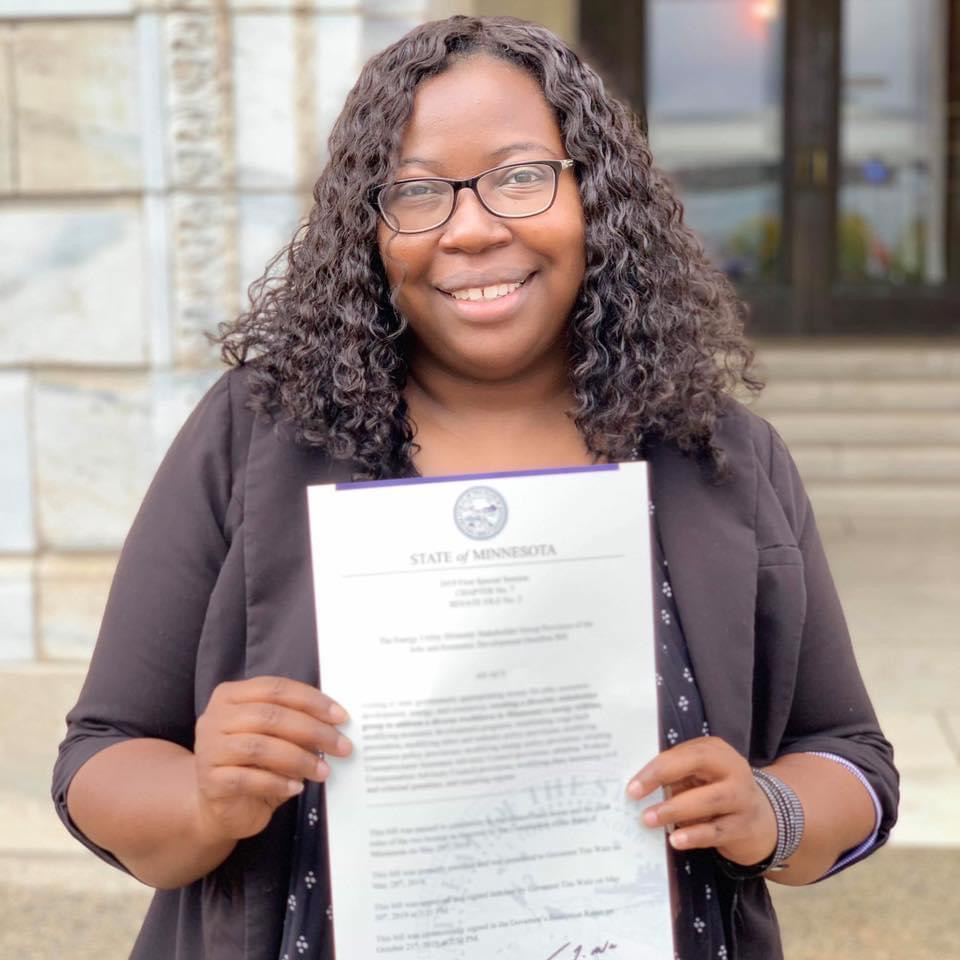

Member of the Minnesota House of Representatives from the 52B district
- In office January 8, 2019 – September 1, 2023
- Preceded by: Regina Barr
- Succeeded by: Bianca Virnig

Personal details
- Born: November 27, 1976 (age 49)
- Party: Democratic–Farmer–Labor
- Children: 2
- Education: University of Minnesota; William Mitchell College of Law
- Occupation: C.E.O, Planned Parenthood North Central States

Ruth Richardson (born November 27, 1976) is an American politician who served in the Minnesota House of Representatives from 2019 to 2023. A member of the Minnesota Democratic–Farmer–Labor Party (DFL), Richardson represented District 52B in the southeastern Twin Cities metropolitan area, which includes the cities of Eagan and Mendota Heights and parts of Dakota County, Minnesota.

== Early life, education, and career ==
Richardson graduated from the University of Minnesota with a Bachelor of Arts in history and sociology and from William Mitchell College of Law with a Juris Doctor.

Richardson was previously the director of programs and national strategic initiatives for the Minnesota Organization on Fetal Alcohol Syndrome and was the CEO of Wayside Recovery Center. Richardson currently is the CEO of Planned Parenthood North Central States.

== Minnesota House of Representatives ==
Richardson was first elected to the Minnesota House of Representatives in 2018, defeating Republican incumbent Regina Barr and has been reelected every two years since.

In 2020, Representative Richardson, alongside five other state representatives and three state senators, had her election results challenged. These claims were dismissed by a judge for failing to state a claim and a lack of subject-matter jurisdiction.

During the 2021-2022 legislative session, Richardson served as chair of the Education Policy Committee. Currently she serves on the Economic Development Finance and Policy Committee.

Richardson authored legislation to make Juneteenth an official state holiday in Minnesota, which passed the House on a vote of 126-1 and was signed by Governor Walz in February 2023.

On September 1, 2023, Richardson announced her resignation from the House to focus on her role at Planned Parenthood.

== Electoral history ==
2018 Minnesota State House - District 52B
Party	Candidate	Votes	%
Democratic (DFL)	Ruth Richardson	11,004	53.74
Republican	Regina Barr (Incumbent)	9,437	46.08
	Write-in	37	0.18
Total votes		20,478	100.0
Democratic (DFL) gain from Republican			

2020 Minnesota State House - District 52B
Party	Candidate	Votes	%
Democratic (DFL)	Ruth Richardson (incumbent)	13,653	55.45
Republican	Cynthia Lonnquist	10,947	44.46
	Write-in	21	0.09
Total votes		24,621	100.0

2022 Minnesota State House - District 52B
Party	Candidate	Votes	%
Democratic (DFL)	Ruth Richardson (incumbent)	13,933	61.67
Republican	Cynthia Lonnquist	8,636	38.23
	Write-in	23	0.10
Total votes		22,592	100.0

== Personal life ==
Richardson has two children and resides in Mendota Heights, Minnesota.
