= Joe Atkins =

American politician

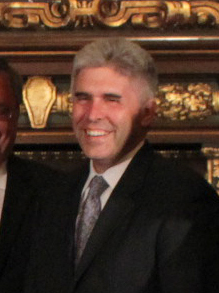

Member of the Minnesota House of Representatives from the 52B district 39B (2003–2013)
- In office January 3, 2003 – January 2, 2017
- Preceded by: Bob Milbert
- Succeeded by: Regina Barr

Mayor of Inver Grove Heights, Minnesota
- In office January 4, 1993 – December 31, 2002
- Preceded by: Rosemary Piekarski-Krech
- Succeeded by: George Tourville

Board of Commissioners for Dakota County, Minnesota from the 4th District
- In office January 3, 2017 – December 31, 2022
- Preceded by: Nancy Schouweiler
- Succeeded by: William Droste

Board of Commissioners for Dakota County, Minnesota from the 2nd District
- Incumbent
- Assumed office January 3, 2023
- Preceded by: Kathleen Gaylord

Personal details
- Born: October 6, 1965 (age 60) South St. Paul, Minnesota
- Party: Minnesota Democratic–Farmer–Labor Party
- Spouse: Julia Atkins
- Children: 3
- Education: University of Minnesota; William Mitchell College of Law
- Profession: Attorney

Joseph Atkins (born October 6, 1965) is a Minnesota attorney and former member of the Minnesota House of Representatives. A member of the Minnesota Democratic–Farmer–Labor Party (DFL), he represented District 52B, which included portions of Dakota County in the southeastern Twin Cities metropolitan area.

== Early life, education, and career ==
Born in South St. Paul, Atkins grew up in Inver Grove Heights, Minnesota. After graduating from Simley High School in 1984, he earned his B.A. in political science from the University of Minnesota-Twin Cities in 1988 and his Juris Doctor magna cum laude from William Mitchell College of Law in Saint Paul in 1991. While in college and law school, he worked full-time as a law clerk and started a legal investigation business.

Atkins has been practicing law since 1991. He is a partner in the law firm of Thuet, Pugh, Rogosheske & Atkins in South St. Paul, one of Minnesota's oldest law firms. He also does significant pro bono work for those who cannot afford to hire an attorney.

== Political career ==
In 1987, Inver Grove Heights voters elected Atkins to the School Board. At the age of 21, he was the youngest school board member in the nation. Five years later, in 1992, he was elected mayor of Inver Grove Heights, serving for 10 years to become its longest-serving mayor to that date (a record since surpassed by sitting mayor George Tourville).

=== Minnesota House of Representatives ===
Atkins was first elected to the House in 2002 and was reelected every two years until retiring in 2016.

=== Potential 2008 U.S. Senate run ===
Atkins considered entering the 2008 U.S. Senate race. He opted out, saying he preferred to remain in Minnesota.

== Personal life ==
Atkins and his wife, Julia, have three children: John, Tom and Katie.

== Honors and accolades ==
Atkins has garnered numerous awards for his public service, including being named one of Ten Outstanding Young Americans by the United States Jaycees in 2001. In 2003, while in his first term in the Minnesota House, he was selected "Freshman Representative of the Year" by Politics in Minnesota magazine. Readers of local newspaper the South-West Review have also voted Atkins a "Best Local Elected Official" 10 times, more than any other official. Atkins received a rating of "10" from the Minnesota Taxpayers League in the 2011 legislative session to bring his career rating to "8".

== Electoral history ==
2014 Minnesota State Representative- House 52B
Party	Candidate	Votes	%	±%
Democratic (DFL)	Joe Atkins (Incumbent)	9,831	64.47	−1.55
Republican	Don Lee	5,405	35.45	

2012 Minnesota State Representative- House 52B
Party	Candidate	Votes	%	±%
Democratic (DFL)	Joe Atkins (Incumbent)	14,493	66.02	+2.79
Republican	Paul Tuschy	7,430	33.85	

2010 Minnesota State Representative- House 39B
Party	Candidate	Votes	%	±%
Democratic (DFL)	Joe Atkins (Incumbent)	10,049	63.23	−10.14
Republican	Terry Pearson	5,837	36.72	

2008 Minnesota State Representative- House 39B
Party	Candidate	Votes	%	±%
Democratic (DFL)	Joe Atkins (Incumbent)	16,291	73.37	+1.65
Republican	Christian Rieck	5,867	26.46	

2006 Minnesota State Representative- House 39B
Party	Candidate	Votes	%	±%
Democratic (DFL)	Joe Atkins (Incumbent)	12,046	71.72	+3.45
Republican	Kathie Roberts	4,735	28.19	

2004 Minnesota State Representative- House 39B
Party	Candidate	Votes	%	±%
Democratic (DFL)	Joe Atkins (Incumbent)	14,594	68.27	+3.01
Republican	Cassandra "Cassi" Holmstrom	6,767	31.65	

2002 Minnesota State Representative- House 39B
Party	Candidate	Votes	%	±%
Democratic (DFL)	Joe Atkins	11,461	65.26	
Republican	Marley Danner	5,384	30.66	
Green	Bob Pollock	702	4.00	
