= Two Rivers High School (Minnesota) =

Location
- 1897 Delaware Avenue; Mendota Heights, Minnesota 55118; United States; 44°53′14″N 93°06′30″W

Information
- Former name: Henry Sibley High School (1954-2021)
- Type: Public secondary school
- Established: 1954
- School district: School District 197
- Principal: Jessica Cabak
- Teaching staff: 58.94 (on an FTE basis)
- Grades: 9–12
- Enrollment: 1,648 (2023-2024)
- Student to teacher ratio: 27.96
- Campus: Suburban
- Colors: Red & Vegas Gold
- Nickname: Warriors
- Rival: St. Thomas Academy, South St. Paul Secondary
- Website: tworivers.isd197.org

Two Rivers High School (formerly known as Henry Sibley High School) is a public high school in Mendota Heights, Minnesota, United States. Operated by School District 197, it was founded in 1954. The school was built in 1971 to serve students in grades 9–12. Today, it serves students in grades 9–12 and houses the district’s administrative offices. It underwent extensive remodeling of several areas in the school after a facilities and technology referendum passed in 2004. It serves as the public high school for Mendota Heights, Mendota, Sunfish Lake, Lilydale, West St. Paul, and parts of Inver Grove Heights and Eagan. It is a member of the Metro East Conference.

== History ==
It was formerly named for Henry Hastings Sibley. In 2021, the District 197 school board voted to change the name to Two Rivers High School. The change was prompted by the reexamination of Sibley's role in the Dakota War of 1862 and the country's largest mass execution. Prior to the final decision of the renaming, parents were asked to take a survey on possibilities of names they would prefer.

== Curriculum ==
Through the Minnesota state Post Secondary Enrollment Options (PSEO) program, students are eligible to take classes at state colleges and universities.

== Demographics ==
In the 2014-15 school year, Henry Sibley High School had 1,387 students. The ethnicity breakdown was as follows:

- American Indian/Alaskan Native - 1%
- Asian - 5%
- Black - 8%
- Hawaiian Native/Pacific Islander - 0.2%
- Hispanic - 27%
- White - 56%
- Other - 3%

== Notable alumni ==
- Ann Bancroft, polar explorer
- Greg Norton, bassist for Hüsker Dü
- Steve Sack, longtime editorial cartoonist for the Minneapolis Star Tribune
