= Lilydale, Minnesota =

City in Minnesota, United States

Lilydale
- City
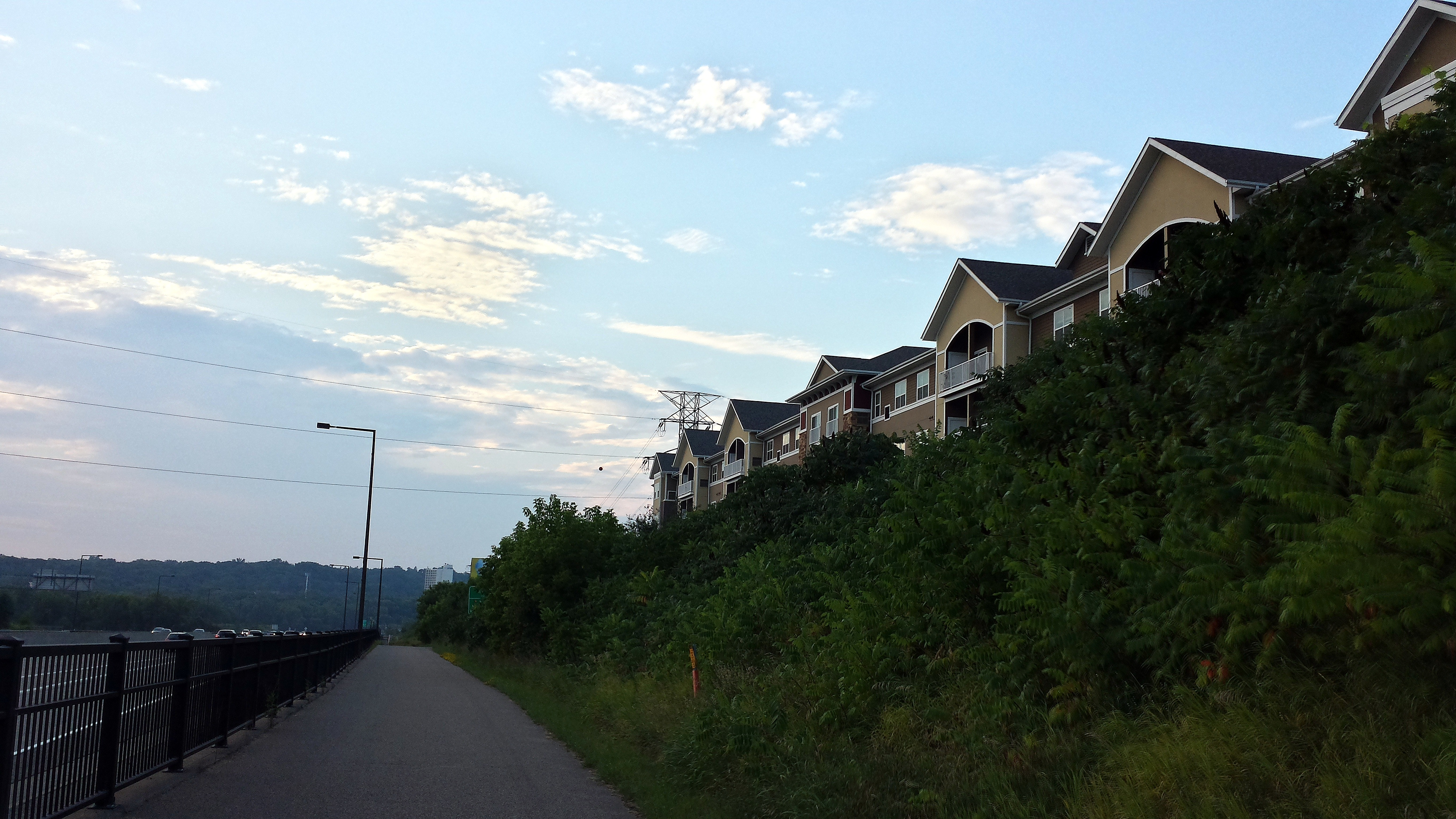

- Location of the city of Lilydale within Dakota County, Minnesota
- Coordinates: 44°54′2″N 93°8′22″W
- Country: United States
- State: Minnesota
- County: Dakota

Area
  - Total: 0.88 sq mi (2.28 km^{2})
  - Land: 0.55 sq mi (1.43 km^{2})
  - Water: 0.33 sq mi (0.85 km^{2})
- Elevation: 702 ft (214 m)

Population (2020)
  - Total: 809
  - Density: 1,461.6/sq mi (564.33/km^{2})
- Time zone: UTC-6 (Central (CST))
  - Summer (DST): UTC-5 (CDT)
- ZIP code: 55118
- Area code: 651
- FIPS code: 27-37016
- GNIS feature ID: 0646656
- Website: lilydale.govoffice.com

Lilydale is a city in Dakota County, Minnesota, United States. The population was 809 at the 2020 census.

== Geography ==
According to the United States Census Bureau, the city has a total area of 0.87 square miles (2.25 km^{2}), of which 0.58 square miles (1.50 km^{2}) is land and 0.29 square miles (0.75 km^{2}) is water.

State Highway 13 serves as a main route in Lilydale.

== Demographics ==
Historical population
Census	Pop.	Note	%±
1960	116		—
1970	322		177.6%
1980	417		29.5%
1990	506		21.3%
2000	552		9.1%
2010	623		12.9%
2020	809		29.9%
U.S. Decennial Census

=== 2010 census ===
As of the census of 2010, there were 623 people, 375 households, and 181 families living in the city. The population density was 1,074.1 inhabitants per square mile (414.7/km^{2}). There were 444 housing units at an average density of 765.5 per square mile (295.6/km^{2}). The racial makeup of the city was 95.5% White, 1.3% African American, 2.2% Asian, 0.3% from other races, and 0.6% from two or more races. Hispanic or Latino of any race were 0.8% of the population.

There were 375 households, of which 6.4% had children under the age of 18 living with them, 43.2% were married couples living together, 3.2% had a female householder with no husband present, 1.9% had a male householder with no wife present, and 51.7% were non-families. 46.1% of all households were made up of individuals, and 28% had someone living alone who was 65 years of age or older. The average household size was 1.66 and the average family size was 2.23.

The median age in the city was 63.3 years. 5.9% of residents were under the age of 18; 3.8% were between the ages of 18 and 24; 13.8% were from 25 to 44; 29.9% were from 45 to 64; and 46.7% were 65 years of age or older. The gender makeup of the city was 41.9% male and 58.1% female.

=== 2000 census ===
As of the census of 2000, there were 552 people, 338 households, and 154 families living in the city. The population density was 756.4 inhabitants per square mile (292.0/km^{2}). There were 383 housing units at an average density of 524.8 per square mile (202.6/km^{2}). The racial makeup of the city was 94.93% White, 0.72% African American, 0.18% Native American, 1.81% Asian, 0.18% Pacific Islander, 1.63% from other races, and 0.54% from two or more races. Hispanic or Latino of any race were 2.17% of the population.

There were 338 households, out of which 5.9% had children under the age of 18 living with them, 41.1% were married couples living together, 3.3% had a female householder with no husband present, and 54.4% were non-families. 49.4% of all households were made up of individuals, and 29.9% had someone living alone who was 65 years of age or older. The average household size was 1.63 and the average family size was 2.25.

In the city, the population was spread out, with 6.0% under the age of 18, 3.8% from 18 to 24, 14.5% from 25 to 44, 29.5% from 45 to 64, and 46.2% who were 65 years of age or older. The median age was 62 years. For every 100 females, there were 70.4 males. For every 100 females age 18 and over, there were 68.5 males.

The median income for a household in the city was $54,792, and the median income for a family was $82,001. Males had a median income of $52,500 versus $40,815 for females. The per capita income for the city was $42,724. None of the families and 2.9% of the population were living below the poverty line, including no under eighteens and 0.8% of those over 64.

== Education ==
It is in the West St. Paul-Mendota Heights-Eagan School District. The district operates Friendly Hills Middle School and Two Rivers High School (formerly Henry Sibley High School) in Mendota Heights, which are the traditional secondary schools for the entire district area.
