= Joseph Godfrey =

Escaped American slave

- Born: 1830; Mendota, Minnesota
- Died: July 1909 (aged 78–79); Santee Sioux Reservation, Nebraska
- Resting place: Episcopal Cemetery at the Santee Sioux Reservation

Joseph Godfrey (c. 1835 – July, 1909) was an African American who escaped from slavery into a Dakota community in Minnesota, United States, and fought on their side during the Dakota War of 1862. He was the only African-American combatant of the war.

== Background ==
Joseph Godfrey was born a slave in about 1835 in Mendota, Minnesota. He was the son of a French Canadian voyageur named Joseph Godefroi and Courtney (aka Polly), a female slave brought from St. Louis, Missouri, to Fort Snelling by an U.S. Army officer. Godfrey was raised in the household of Alexis Bailly, where his mother was enslaved. Not much is known about his childhood, except that he received little to no education.

At some point Godfrey was taken to St. Paul, Minnesota, by a man named Bronson. During this time Godfrey served as an aid for Henry Hastings Sibley, prominent trader and later first governor of Minnesota, who also played a key role in the U.S.-Dakota War. His mother was sold south again when he was five. She sued for her freedom for having been held as a slave in the Northwest Territory where slavery was illegal and won.

Suffering ill treatment from his owners, Godfrey ran away and found refuge among the Dakota as a fugitive slave. In 1857 he moved to the Lower Sioux Agency, where he married the daughter of Wahpaduta (Red Leaf). In August 1862, while helping local Dakota load hay onto a wagon, Godfrey was approached by another Dakota man announcing that all the white people had been killed at the agency. On the spot, Godfrey was asked what side he would take. Afraid for his life and family, Godfrey felt compelled to join the war.

== "Slayer of Many" ==
Later that fall Godfrey was accused by Col. Sibley of joining the Dakota between August 19 and September 29 and actively participating in attacks. Dakota warriors awarded him the name "Atokte," meaning "slayer of many" in the Dakota language. Godfrey denied he had killed anyone. However, there were conflicting reports about his role in the conflict and how active he really was.

== Testimony and pardon ==
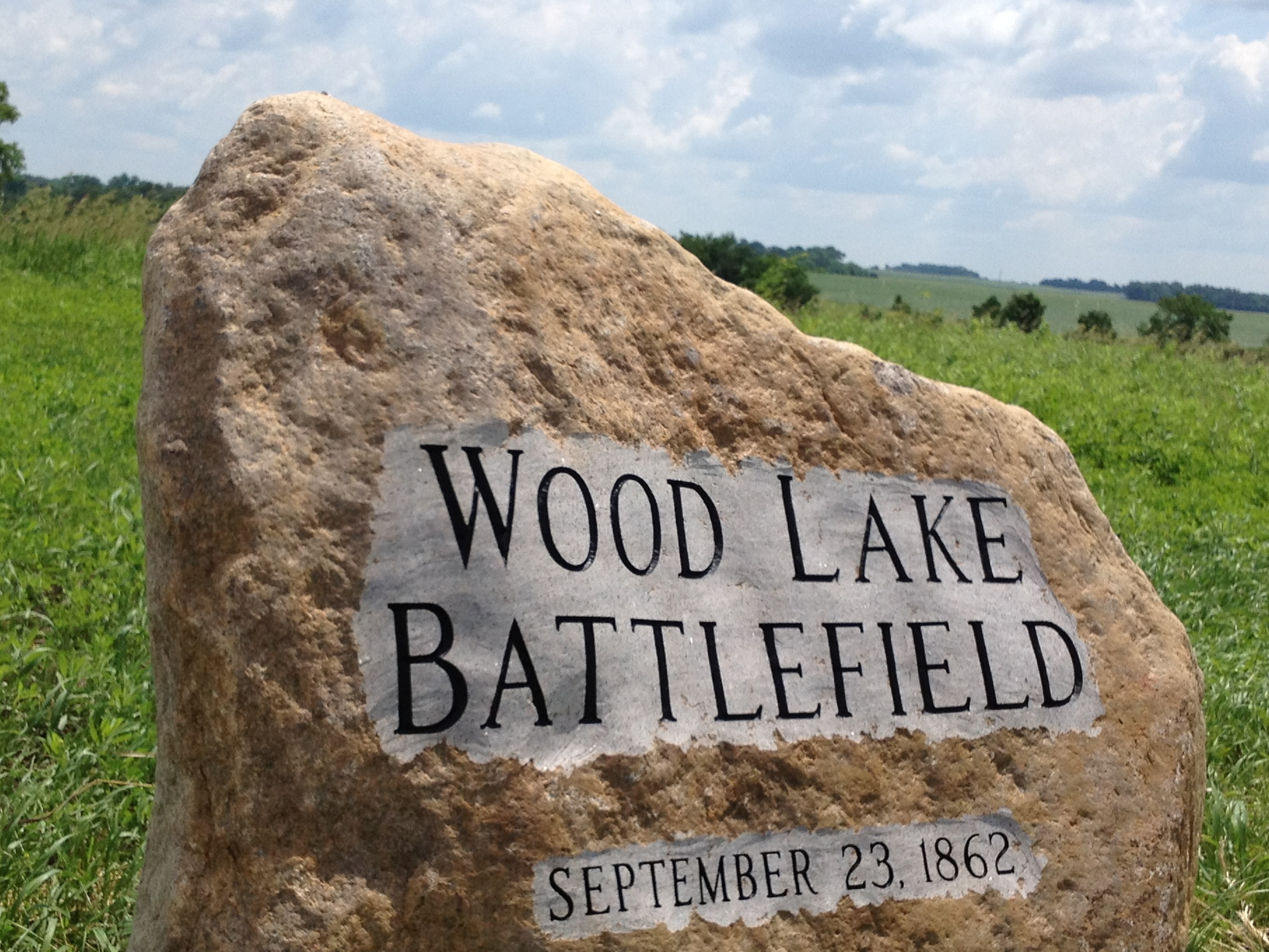
Marker at the site of the Battle of Wood Lake.

Godfrey was captured after the Battle of Wood Lake on September 23, 1862, and held to face trial. He was the first person tried by the military commission on September 28, 1862. In an effort to escape execution, Godfrey testified against eleven of the thirty-eight Dakota warriors who were eventually hanged on December 26, 1862. While he escaped conviction for murder, he was convicted of participating in the fighting and sentenced to death by hanging. In exchange for his testimony, the commission recommended that the President commute his sentence to 10 years imprisonment. In its recommendation to President Abraham Lincoln, the court commission stated that "a large number of men of the very worst character would have gone unpunished" without Godfrey's testimony. Lincoln agreed to the commutation.

Godfrey was sent to Camp McClellan in Davenport, Iowa, to serve his prison sentence. After serving three years he was pardoned and freed in 1866. Upon his release, he settled on the Santee Sioux Reservation in Nebraska. Godfrey spent the rest of his life on the Santee Reservation, and died there from natural causes in July 1909. His body was buried in the Episcopalian Cemetery on the reservation.

== General sources ==
- Bachman, Walt. Northern Slave, Black Dakota: The Life and Times of Joseph Godfrey. Bloomington, Minn: Pond Dakota Press, 2013. ISBN 978-0985009908.
