= Reuben Freeman House =

Historic house in Minnesota, United States

- U.S. National Register of Historic Places
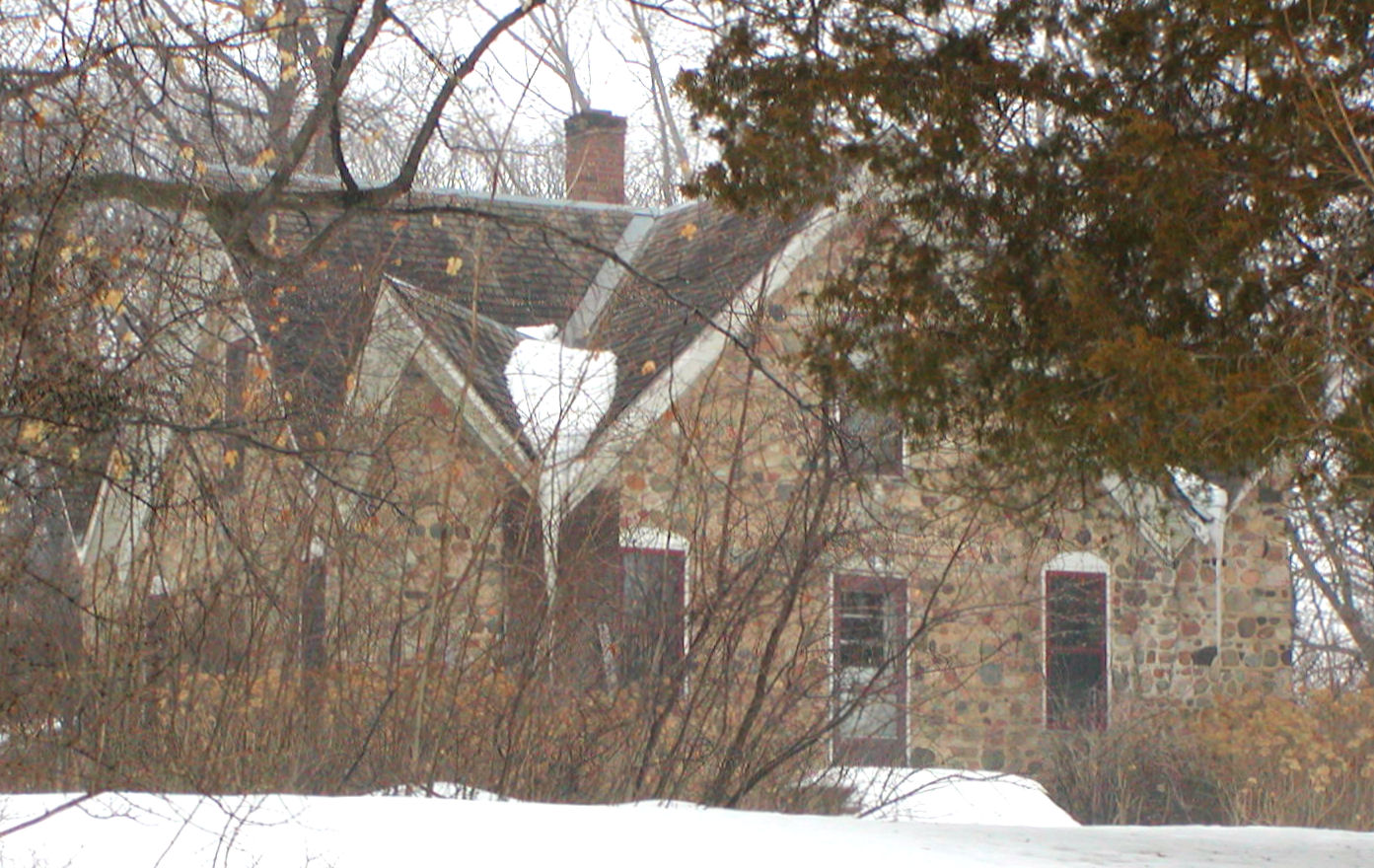
- Freeman's eight-gabled fieldstone house in 2008

- Location within Minnesota Location within the United States
- Location: 9091 Inver Grove Trail, Inver Grove Heights, Minnesota
- Coordinates: 44°49′3″N 93°1′23″W
- Built: 1875
- Architect: Reuben Freeman
- NRHP reference No.: 79001231
- Added to NRHP: December 31, 1979

The Reuben Freeman House is a unique home, it sports eight gables and was built 1887 in Inver Grove Heights in the U.S. state of Minnesota. Freeman was a German immigrant farmer who collected stones from his acreage to build his coursed fieldstone house. Bottle glass adorns the masonry around the second-story windows, further proving his eccentricity.
