= School District 197 =

School district in Minnesota, United States

Independent School District 197, also known as West St. Paul-Mendota Heights-Eagan, is a school district headquartered in Mendota Heights, Minnesota.

The district, located in Dakota County, includes all of Mendota Heights, Lilydale, Mendota, Sunfish Lake, and West St. Paul. It also has northern portions of Eagan and a small piece of Inver Grove Heights.

== History ==
Superintendent Nancy Allen-Mastro was scheduled to retire in 2017.

In 2018 the voters passed a referendum for a bond worth $117,000,000. 3,601 people voted yes, and 2,180 people voted no, making it an over 62% yes rate. Nick Woltman of the Twin Cities Pioneer Press described the bond as being "controversial".

== Schools ==
High schools

- Two Rivers High School (formerly Henry Sibley High School)

Middle schools

- Friendly Hills Middle School
- Heritage E-STEM Magnet School

Elementary schools

- Garlough Environmental Magnet School
- Mendota Elementary School
- Moreland Arts and Sciences School
- Pilot Knob STEM Magnet School
- Somerset Elementary School
