= Simley High School =

Simley Senior High School
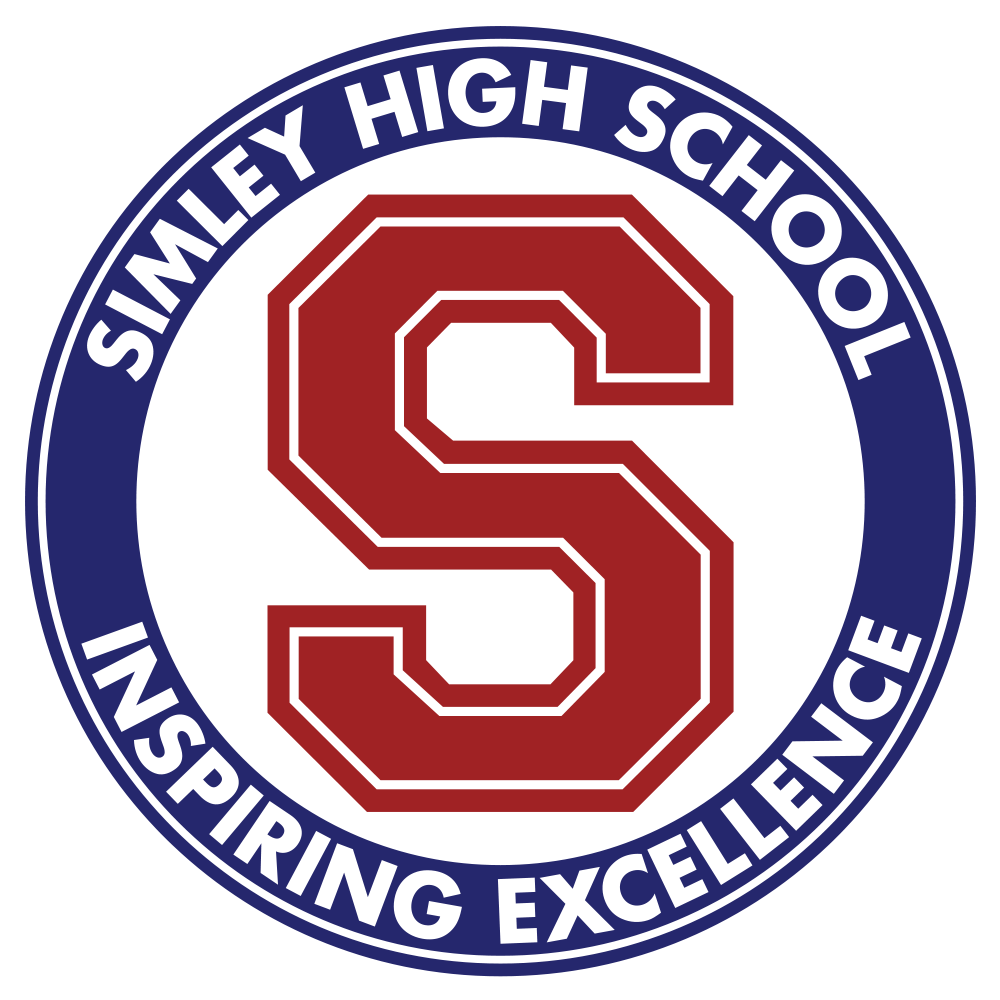

Location
- 2920 80th St E Inver Grove Heights, Minnesota 55076; United States

Information
- Type: Public Secondary
- Established: 1960
- School district: Independent School District 199
- Principal: Carrie Gillund
- Teaching staff: 48
- Enrollment: 1,058 (2025-2026)
- Student to teacher ratio: 22:1
- Colors: Columbia blue, scarlet and white
- Website: https://simley.isd199.org/

Simley High School is a public high school in Inver Grove Heights, Minnesota, United States. The school opened in 1960 with a graduating class of 19 students. In 2025, the school had approximately 1,100 students enrolled in grades 9–12. Carrie Gillund joined Simley High School as the Principal during the 2024 to 2025 school year.

Simley is a member of Independent School District 199 (Inver Grove Heights Schools), the Minnesota State High School League (MSHSL) and the Metro East Conference.

Simley High School was named for I.T. Simley, the retired superintendent of schools from South St. Paul, Minnesota, who was a consultant to Inver Grove Heights during the district’s transition years. The school year is divided into four periods (quarters) which are approximately twelve weeks long.

== Academic performance ==
The Washington Post and Newsweek rankings
The Washington Post ranked Simley High School as the 14th-most challenging high school in Minnesota and one of the top 100 in the Midwest. Newsweek named Simley the 24th-best high school in Minnesota.

2013 Team Academic All-State Gold Award
Simley's girls' track and field team received an Academic All-State gold award from the Minnesota High School Track Coaches Association with a cumulative 3.961 grade-point average. It was the third year in a row that the girls' track team has received the gold award.

2013 Team Academic All-State Gold Award
Simley's gymnastics team received an Academic All-State gold award from the Minnesota Girls' Gymnastics Coaches Association and its wrestling team received an Academic All-State gold award from the Minnesota Wrestling Coaches Association.

2013 Team Academic All-State Silver Award
Simley's boys' basketball team received an Academic All-State silver award from the Minnesota Basketball Coaches Association.

== Demographics ==
In 2025, the student population was 42.2% White, 31.3% Hispanic, 11.2% Black, 4.8% Asian, and 10.5% from other demographic backgrounds.

== Sports ==
American football: The 2022 football team won the AAAA Minnesota Prep Bowl Championship defeating Hutchinson 34-24.

Boys' basketball: In the 2014-15 season, the boys' varsity basketball team finished with a final record of 18 wins and 8 losses. Its last game of the season was against Saint Paul Johnson in the Section 4AAA semifinals. The Spartans' triumphant run ended with a 93-65 loss with a great effort by Jack Stensgard with 18 points and double figures by others.

Golf: The golf team had two participants in the state tournament in 2019, senior Nick Battis and junior Aaron Leafgren. Mitch Vogel, a senior, was lucky enough to score an ace during a tryout round at Inverwood Golf Course on the par 3 sixth hole.

Boys' hockey: The Spartans play at the Veteran's Memorial Community Center. They are in the Metro East Conference and compete in Section 4A. The Spartans have made multi-section final appearances (most recently during the 2017-18 season) and two state tournament appearances in 1996 and 2003.

== Extra-curricular activities ==
Extra-curricular activities include FIRST Robotics Team, Math League, Simley Theatre Guild, Yearbook, Simley Marching Band, International Club, National Honors Society, Spanish Club, GSA, BSU, Speech Team, Trap Team and Badminton Club.

== Conference ==
Simley High School joined the Metro East Conference conference during the 2014 to 2015 school year after the dissolution of the Classic Suburban Conference. The other schools in this conference include Hastings High School, Two Rivers High School, Hill-Murray School, Mahtomedi High School, North High School, South Saint Paul Secondary and Tartan Senior High School.
