= Inver Grove Heights, Minnesota =

City in Minnesota, United States

- City
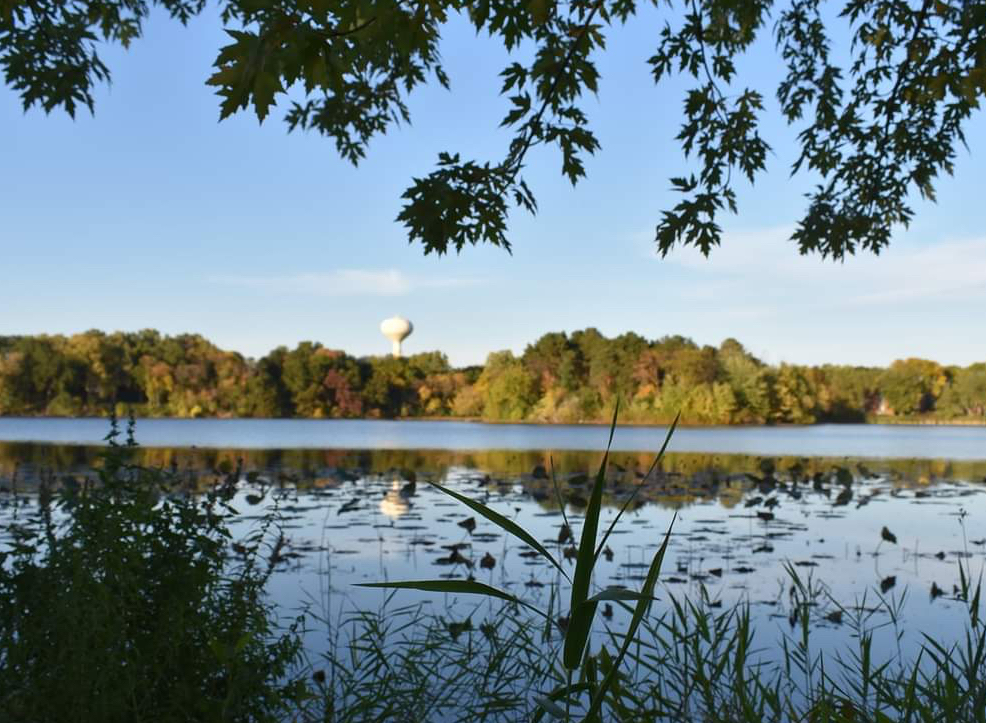
- Nickname(s): Inver Grove, IGH
- Interactive map of Inver Grove Heights, Minnesota
- Coordinates: 44°50′15″N 93°3′6″W
- Country: United States
- State: Minnesota
- County: Dakota
- Established: 1852
- Incorporated: March 9, 1965

Government
  - Type: Weak Mayor–Council
  - Mayor: Brenda Dietrich

Area
  - Total: 30.22 sq mi (78.27 km^{2})
  - Land: 27.85 sq mi (72.14 km^{2})
  - Water: 2.37 sq mi (6.13 km^{2})
- Elevation: 879 ft (268 m)

Population (2020)
  - Total: 35,801
  - Estimate (2022): 35,701
  - Density: 1,285.3/sq mi (496.25/km^{2})
- Time zone: UTC-6 (Central)
  - Summer (DST): UTC-5 (CDT)
- ZIP codes: 55076, 55077
- Area code: 651
- FIPS code: 27-31076
- GNIS feature ID: 0645437
- Website: ighmn.gov

Inver Grove Heights is a city in Dakota County, Minnesota, United States. The population was 35,801 at the 2020 census. The city was formed on March 9, 1965, with the merger of the village of Inver Grove and Inver Grove Township.

It is one of 186 cities and townships in the seven-county Minneapolis-Saint Paul metropolitan area. Inver Grove Heights is 9 miles (14 km) southeast of Saint Paul; nearby communities are South St. Paul, West St. Paul, Sunfish Lake, Eagan, Newport, and Saint Paul Park (the last two across the Mississippi River).

== History ==
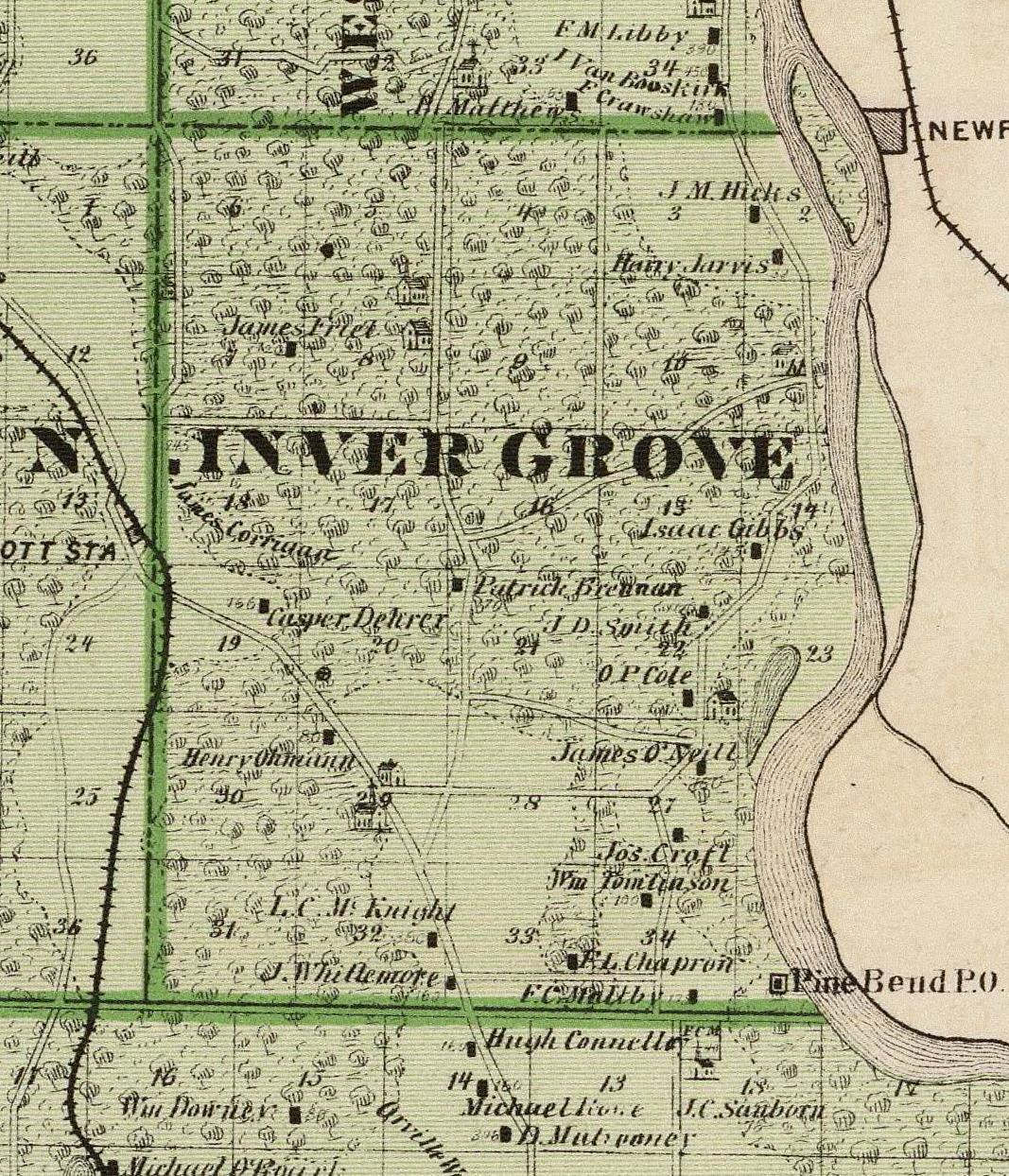
Map of Inver Grove in 1874

After the signing of the Treaty of Traverse des Sioux in 1851, settlers from Ireland and Germany quickly staked claims in the rolling countryside west of the Mississippi River. Those of Irish descent farmed the eastern part of the community, while Germans cleared the wooded land to the west for their farms. French and English settlers built their homes along the river. The township of Inver Grove Heights was named after the Irish fishing village of Inver and the German town of Grove. Records show that 240 farms, four churches, and four school districts were founded by 1880. On March 9, 1965, the village of Inver Grove and Inver Grove Township merged to form Inver Grove Heights.

Historic sites in Inver Grove Heights include:

- Chief Medicine Bottle's Village: formed in 1836, became Pine Bend village and post office
- Mendota-Wabasha Road: a military road laid out by John S. Potter in 1853. Rich Valley Road now follows the old military road.
- District 7 School: Dakota County's first public school, established in 1854
- Salem United Methodist Church, organized in 1854
- Old Emanuel Lutheran Church, site of first log church in 1854; services and church school were in German
- Church of St. Patrick: Catholic church parish established on January 9, 1856
- Salem Evangelical Church: First congregation in Minnesota of the Evangelical Association of North America was organized here on March 2, 1857
- Josiah Burwell's House: where Inver Grove Township was first organized in 1858, at Rich Valley Road and 102nd Street
- Reuben Freeman House of eight gables: built in 1876 to one-up the House of Seven Gables
- Inver Grove Town Hall: first town hall building, built in 1878
- Inver Grove Village railway depot: built in 1886
- Rock Island Swing Bridge: Built in 1894, the double-decker swing bridge spanned the Mississippi River between Inver Grove Heights and St. Paul Park. Closed to rail traffic in 1980 and to road traffic in 1999, it opened as Swing Bridge park in 2011.
- Duke's Restaurant: built in 1906 as Pierkarski's butcher shop; restaurant offered food to railway workers; later became Jersey's Bar
- B-52 Crash Site: on September 16, 1958, a U.S. Air force B-52D bomber crashed while on a Cold War training mission originating from Loring Air Force Base, Limestone, Maine. Seven crewmen gave their lives for their country; marker on Broderick near West Loop Court

== Geography ==
According to the United States Census Bureau, the city has an area of 30.12 square miles (78.01 km^{2}), of which 27.76 square miles (71.90 km^{2}) is land and 2.36 square miles (6.11 km^{2}) is water.

Interstate Highway 494 (a beltway bypass of Minneapolis–Saint Paul), U.S. Highway 52, Minnesota Highway 55, and Minnesota Highway 3 are four of Inver Grove Heights's main routes. 80th Street East (numbered from downtown Saint Paul) crosses the city in an east–west direction.

In 2022, a meteoric impact crater was identified in the Pine Bend Bluffs Scientific and Natural Area in southern Inver Grove Heights. It has been informally named the "Pine Bend impact" and has been dated to 500 million years ago. It has a diameter of about four kilometers.

== Demographics ==
Historical population
Census	Pop.	Note	%±
1860	646		—
1870	971		50.3%
1880	791		−18.5%
1890	1,211		53.1%
1900	1,402		15.8%
1910	1,384		−1.3%
1920	1,573		13.7%
1930	1,617		2.8%
1940	1,887		16.7%
1950	2,419		28.2%
1960	6,266		159.0%
1970	12,148		93.9%
1980	17,171		41.3%
1990	22,477		30.9%
2000	29,751		32.4%
2010	33,880		13.9%
2020	35,801		5.7%
2022 (est.)	35,701		−0.3%
U.S. Decennial Census; 2020 Census Note: Inver Grove and Inver Grove; Township were merged in 1965 to form Inver Grove Heights.

=== 2020 census ===
As of the 2020 census, Inver Grove Heights had a population of 35,801. The median age was 40.5 years. 21.8% of residents were under the age of 18 and 16.8% of residents were 65 years of age or older. For every 100 females there were 93.1 males, and for every 100 females age 18 and over there were 90.0 males age 18 and over.

92.6% of residents lived in urban areas, while 7.4% lived in rural areas.

There were 14,338 households in Inver Grove Heights, of which 29.0% had children under the age of 18 living in them. Of all households, 49.2% were married-couple households, 15.9% were households with a male householder and no spouse or partner present, and 27.6% were households with a female householder and no spouse or partner present. About 27.1% of all households were made up of individuals and 11.8% had someone living alone who was 65 years of age or older.

There were 14,766 housing units, of which 2.9% were vacant. The homeowner vacancy rate was 0.7% and the rental vacancy rate was 3.9%.

Racial composition as of the 2020 census
Race	Number	Percent
White	26,692	74.6%
Black or African American	2,175	6.1%
American Indian and Alaska Native	234	0.7%
Asian	1,591	4.4%
Native Hawaiian and Other Pacific Islander	33	0.1%
Some other race	2,204	6.2%
Two or more races	2,872	8.0%
Hispanic or Latino (of any race)	4,293	12.0%

=== 2010 census ===
As of the census of 2010, there were 33,880 people, 13,476 households, and 9,036 families living in the city. The population density was 1,220.5 inhabitants per square mile (471.2/km^{2}). There were 14,062 housing units at an average density of 506.6 per square mile (195.6/km^{2}). The racial makeup of the city was 85.7% White, 3.8% African American, 0.4% Native American, 3.4% Asian, 0.1% Pacific Islander, 3.5% from other races, and 3.1% from two or more races. Hispanic or Latino of any race were 8.9% of the population.

There were 13,476 households, of which 32.9% had children under the age of 18 living with them, 51.4% were married couples living together, 11.4% had a female householder with no husband present, 4.3% had a male householder with no wife present, and 32.9% were non-families. 26.2% of all households were made up of individuals, and 8.8% had someone living alone who was 65 years of age or older. The average household size was 2.50 and the average family size was 3.04.

The median age in the city was 38.4 years. 24.5% of residents were under the age of 18; 8.5% were between the ages of 18 and 24; 26.3% were from 25 to 44; 29.1% were from 45 to 64; and 11.8% were 65 years of age or older. The gender makeup of the city was 48.0% male and 52.0% female.

=== 2000 census ===
As of the census of 2000, there were 29,751 people, 11,257 households, and 7,924 families living in the city. The population density was 1,038.8 inhabitants per square mile (401.1/km^{2}). There were 11,457 housing units at an average density of 400.1 per square mile (154.5/km^{2}). The racial makeup of the city was 91.80% White, 2.10% African American, 0.48% Native American, 2.01% Asian, 0.02% Pacific Islander, 1.73% from other races, and 1.86% from two or more races. Hispanic or Latino of any race were 4.22% of the population.

There were 11,257 households, out of which 37.3% had children under the age of 18 living with them, 56.4% were married couples living together, 10.3% had a female householder with no husband present, and 29.6% were non-families. 21.5% of all households were made up of individuals, and 4.7% had someone living alone who was 65 years of age or older. The average household size was 2.62 and the average family size was 3.09.

In the city, the population was spread out, with 27.3% under the age of 18, 9.2% from 18 to 24, 33.9% from 25 to 44, 21.7% from 45 to 64, and 7.8% who were 65 years of age or older. The median age was 34 years. For every 100 females, there were 98.2 males. For every 100 females age 18 and over, there were 94.5 males.

The median income for a household in the city was $59,090, and the median income for a family was $68,629. Males had a median income of $45,369 versus $32,080 for females. The per capita income for the city was $25,493. About 3.0% of families and 4.2% of the population were below the poverty line, including 5.2% of those under age 18 and 4.9% of those age 65 or over.

== Economy ==
In 2007, the Metropolitan Council estimated the employment in Inver Grove Heights to be 11,158. The city hosts the headquarters of CHS, Inc., an agricultural cooperative ranked 12th in the 2007 ICA Global 300 list of mutuals and cooperatives, and 145th on the Fortune 500 list of U.S. corporations. Pine Bend Refinery, the largest oil refinery in Minnesota and fourteenth largest in the U.S., straddles the border with Rosemount. It is operated by Flint Hills Resources.

Inver Grove Heights is also the home of Gertens Greenhouses, one of the largest garden center locations in the United States.

=== Top employers ===
According to Inver Grove Heights's 2021 Comprehensive Annual Financial Report, the largest employers in the city are:

#	Employer	# of Employees
1	Cenex / CHS Cooperatives	1,600
2	ISD 199 (Inver Grove Heights Community Schools)	668
3	Gertens	435
4	City of Inver Grove Heights	421
5	Travel Tags	350
6	Inver Hills Community College	337
7	Total Construction and Equipment	250
8	Walmart	210
9	Woodlyn Heights Senior Living	200
10	Cub Foods	160

== Education ==
The Inver Grove Heights Community Schools district or Independent School District 199 operates five schools in the city:

- Simley High School
- Inver Grove Heights Middle School
- Hilltop Elementary School
- Pine Bend Elementary School
- Salem Hills Elementary School

There is one private school for preschool through eighth grade in Inver Grove Heights: Berea Lutheran Church.

The western part of the city is served by Independent School District 196, with students attending Dakota Hills Middle School, Rosemount Middle School, Eagan High School, and Rosemount High School.

A small piece in the northwest is in School District 197.

Inver Grove Heights is also home to Inver Hills Community College.

== Government and politics ==
Inver Grove Heights's municipal government provides for a council of five members, one of whom is the mayor. The mayor is Brenda Dietrich, who was elected in 2022.

The other council members are:

- Sue Gliva
- John Murphy
- Tony Scales
- Mary T'Kach

In general, city government is nonpartisan. Candidates need not be selected or endorsed by political parties, and by state law no such endorsement appears on the ballot. The mayor is elected every two years while council members are elected every four. Terms are staggered with two council members elected one election cycle and the two others two years later. The non-mayoral seats are elected in pairs, giving voters the chance to vote for up to two candidates. If necessary, races are narrowed down during a primary election.

As a part of Dakota County, Inver Grove Heights's northern and central precincts (1, 8-10) join with regions northward to form the Second District on the County Commission. It has been represented by former South St. Paul Mayor Kathleen A. Gaylord since 2003. The southern, eastern, and far western portions of the city (precincts 2-7) are joined by regions south and west to form the Fourth District of the County Commission, which has been represented by former State Representative and former Inver Grove Heights Mayor Joe Atkins since 2017. County commissioners serve four-year terms.

Inver Grove Heights is in Minnesota's 2nd congressional district, represented by Angie Craig since 2019.

The city is in the state's 53rd legislative district, represented in the Minnesota Senate by Matt Klein. Most of the city is in Minnesota House district 53A, represented by Mary Frances Clardy; the northeast of the city is in House district 52B, represented by Rick Hansen.

=== Election results ===
Presidential election results

2020 Precinct Results Spreadsheet2016 Precinct Results Spreadsheet2012 Precinct Results Spreadsheet2008 Precinct Results Spreadsheet2004 Precinct Results Spreadsheet2000 Precinct Results Spreadsheet1996 Precinct Results1992 Precinct Results1988 Precinct Results1984 Precinct Results1980 Precinct Results1976 Precinct Results1968 Precinct Results1964 Precinct Results1960 Precinct Results
Year	Republican	Democratic	Third parties
2020	41.3% 8,851	56.2% 12,034	2.5% 526
2016	42.4% 8,155	48.6% 9,354	9.0% 1,727
2012	45.0% 8,573	52.8% 10,042	2.2% 418
2008	43.4% 8,356	54.3% 10,468	2.3% 446
2004	46.7% 8,515	52.3% 9,531	1.0% 194
2000	42.0% 6,442	50.7% 7,763	7.3% 1,120
1996	30.9% 3,647	56.6% 6,691	12.6% 1,483
1992	27.0% 3,361	46.3% 5,754	26.7% 3,325
1988	40.8% 4,031	59.2% 5,845	0.0% 0
1984	44.2% 3,692	55.8% 4,654	0.0% 0
1980	36.3% 2,747	53.7% 4,069	10.0% 759
1976	36.9% 2,370	60.6% 3,892	2.5% 161
1968	31.6% 1,210	63.1% 2,414	5.3% 204
1964	10.7% 35	89.3% 291	0.0% 0
1960	25.6% 75	74.1% 217	0.3% 1

== Sports and recreation ==
Facilities include Inver Wood Golf Course and Arbor Pointe Golf Club. There is also an 18-hole disc golf course called North Valley. The city also has a public community center with a waterpark, two sheets of ice and a full gym shared with the National Guard.

== Gallery of images ==
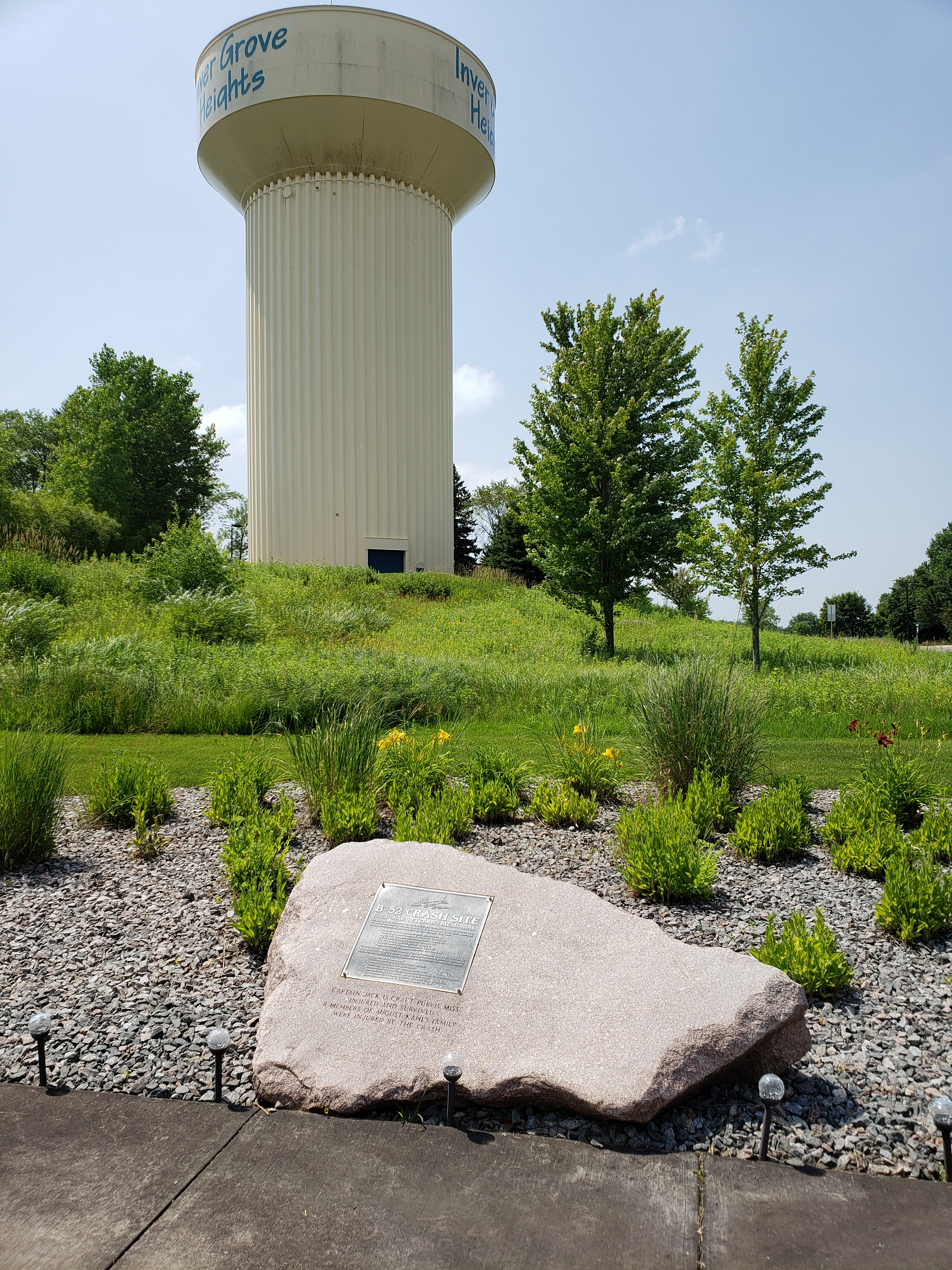
B-52 Crash Site memorial with Inver Grove Heights water tower in the background

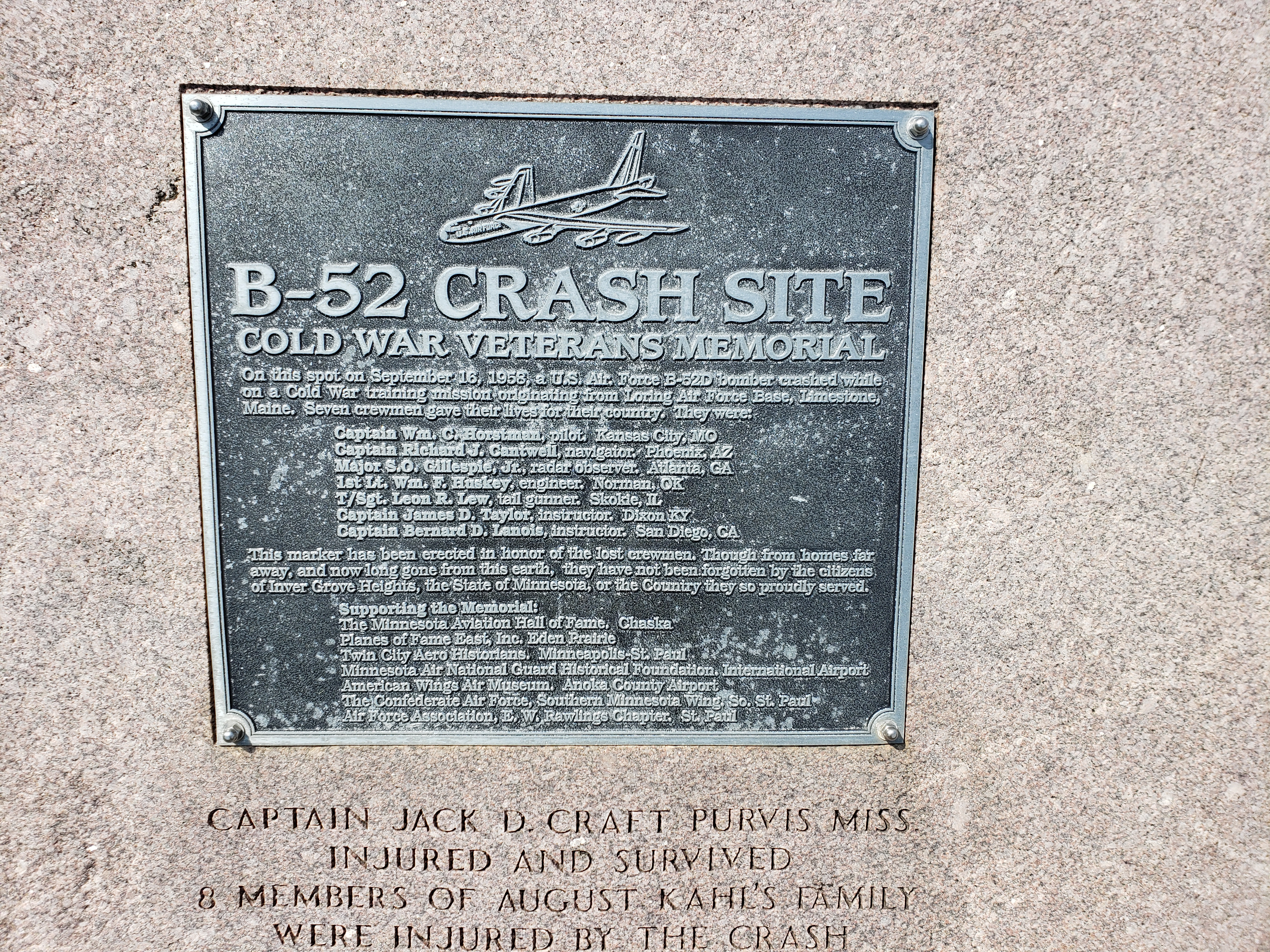
Plaque commemorating those who died in the B-52 crash

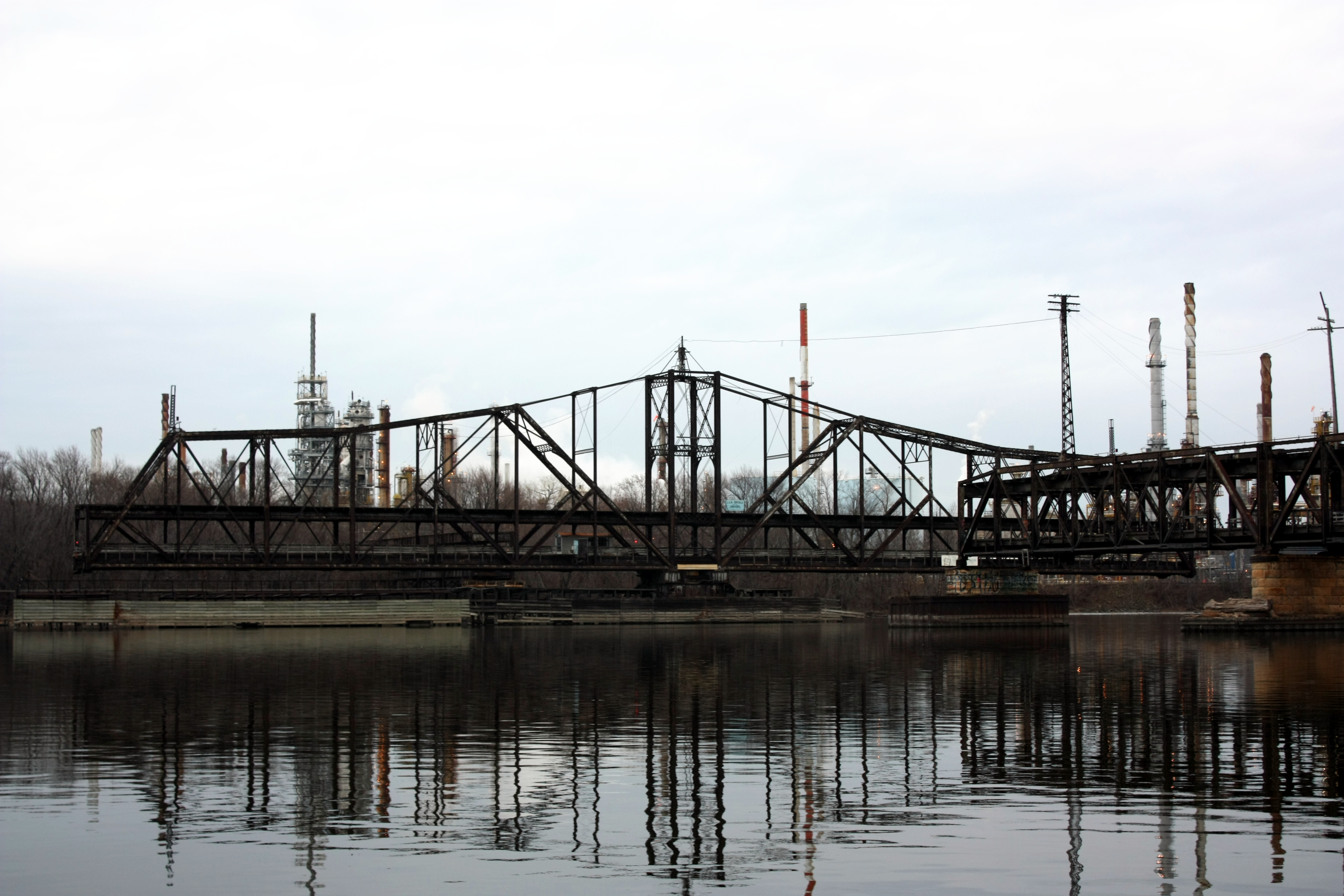
Rock Island Swing Bridge in 2008

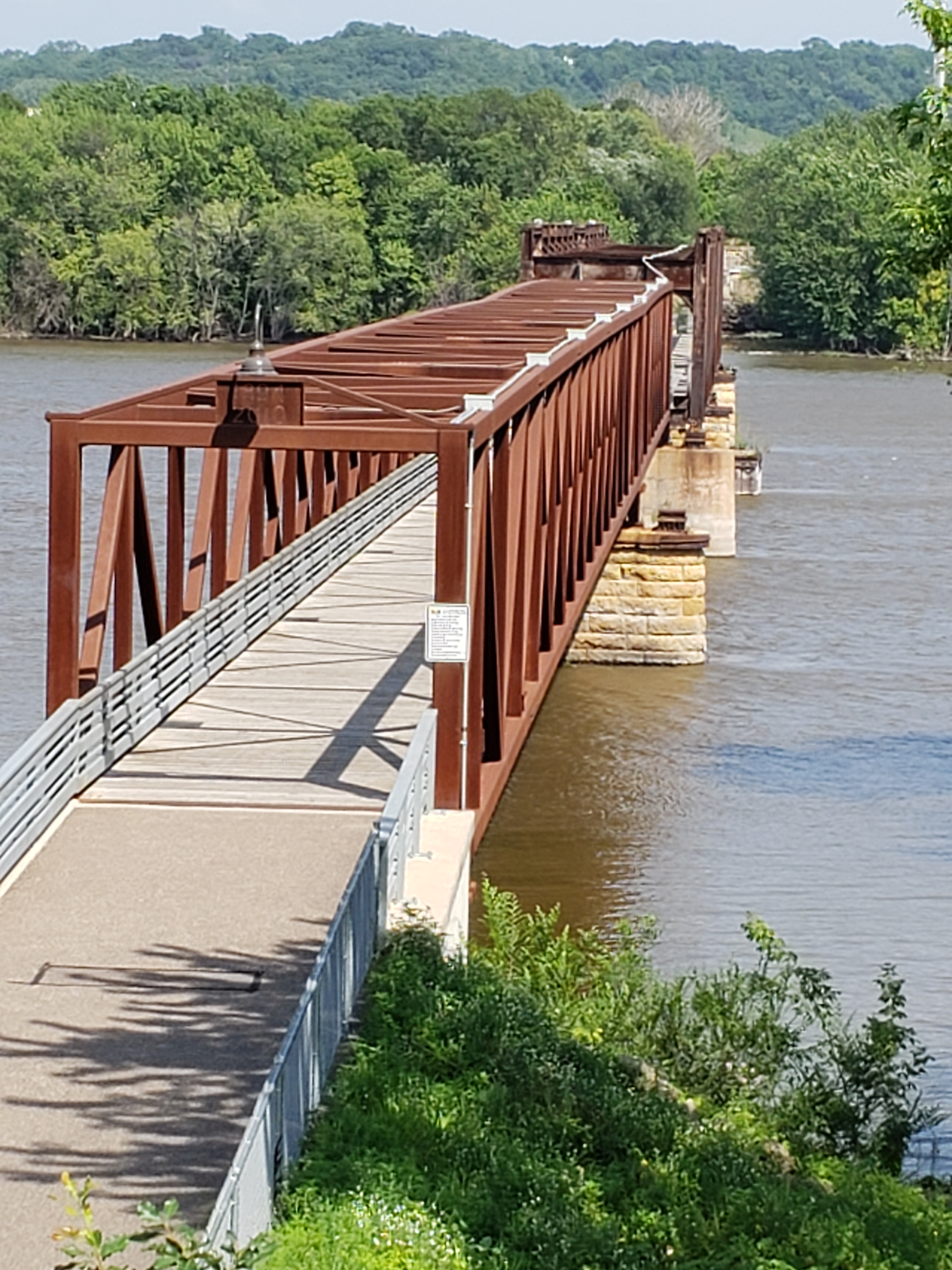
Rock Island Swing Bridge Park

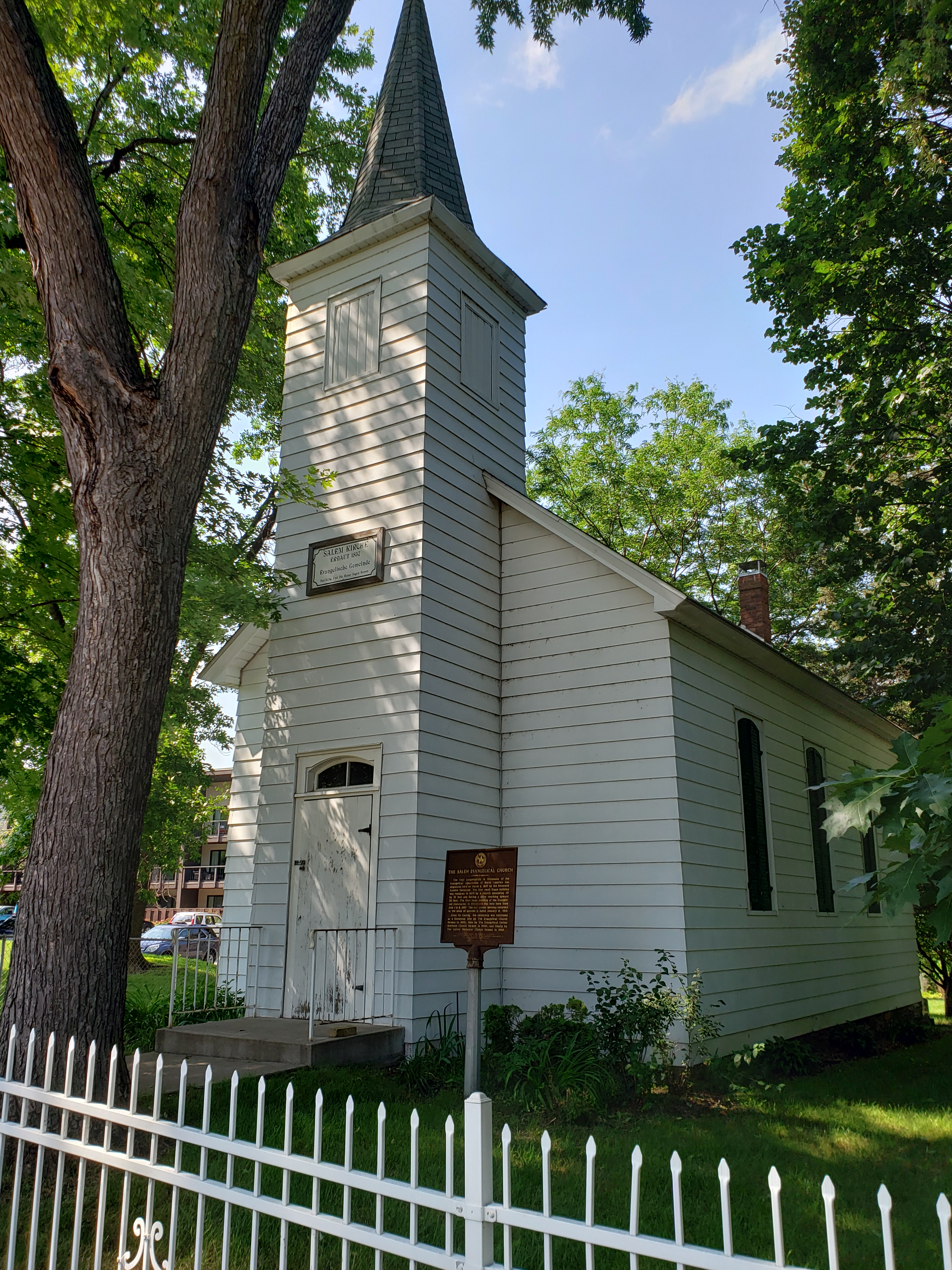
Salem Evangelical Church

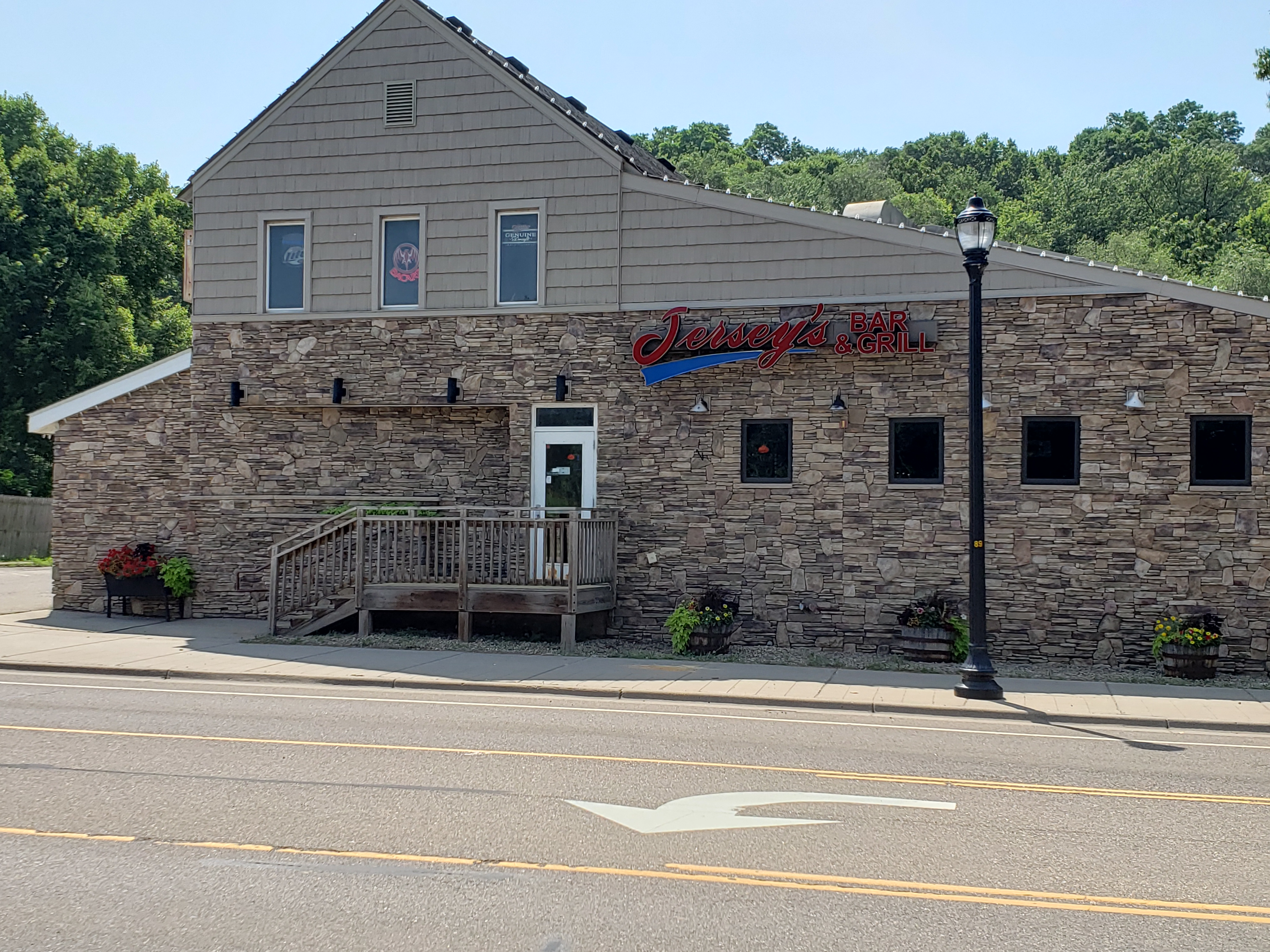
Former Duke's Restaurant location, now Jersey's Bar and Grill

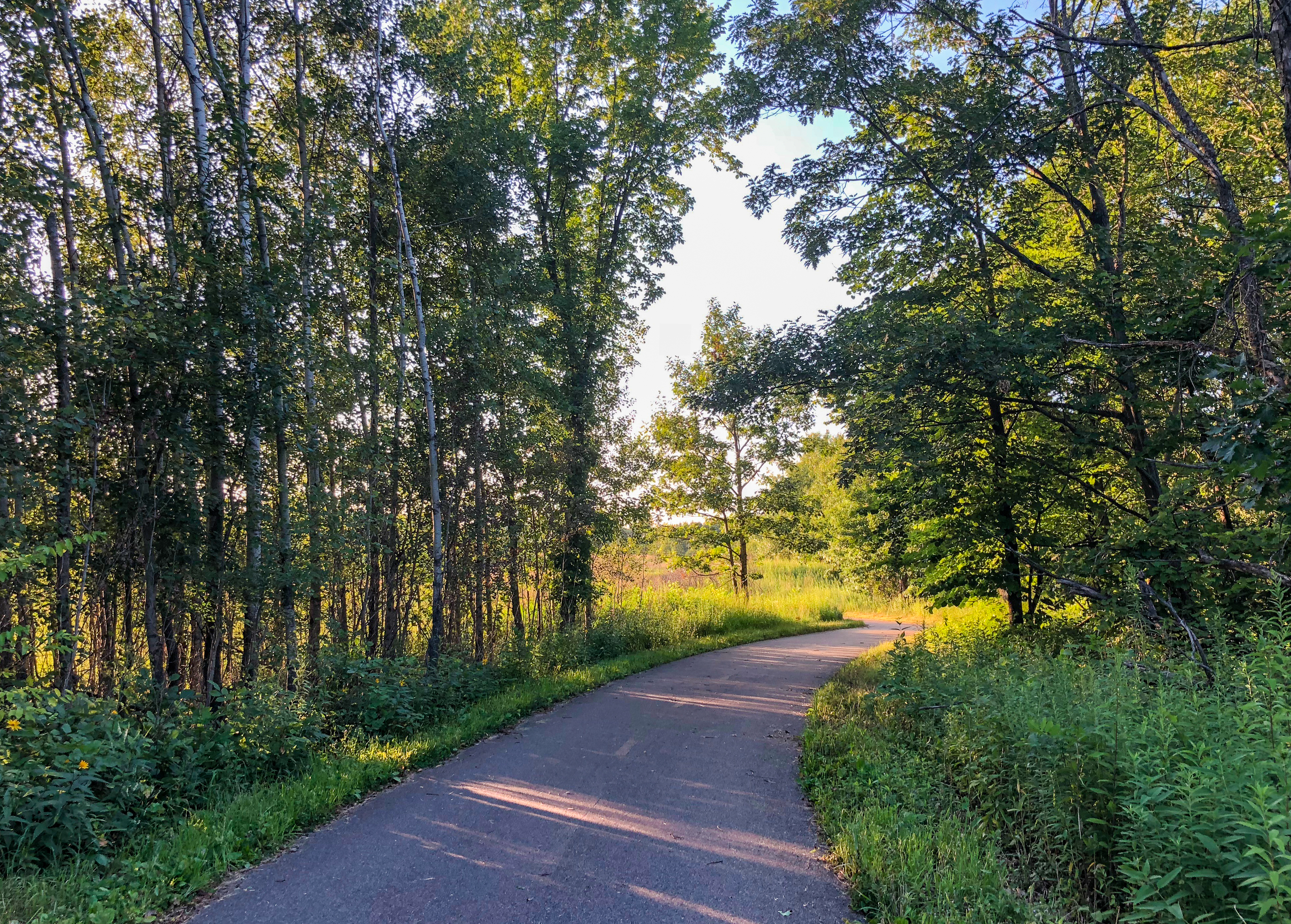
Bike Trail in Inver Grove Heights

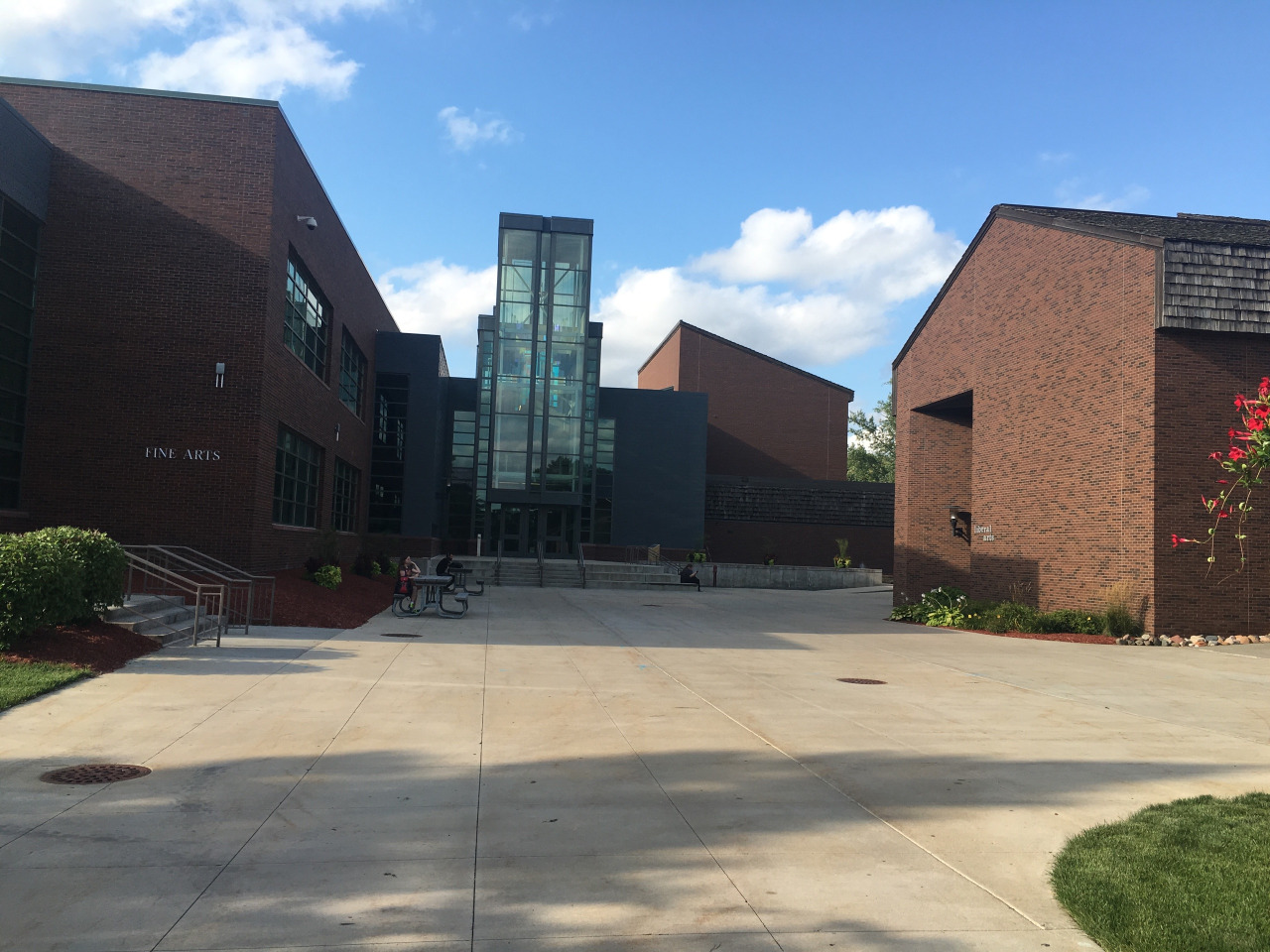
Inver Hills Fine Arts Building
