= Eagan, Minnesota =

City in Minnesota, United States

- City
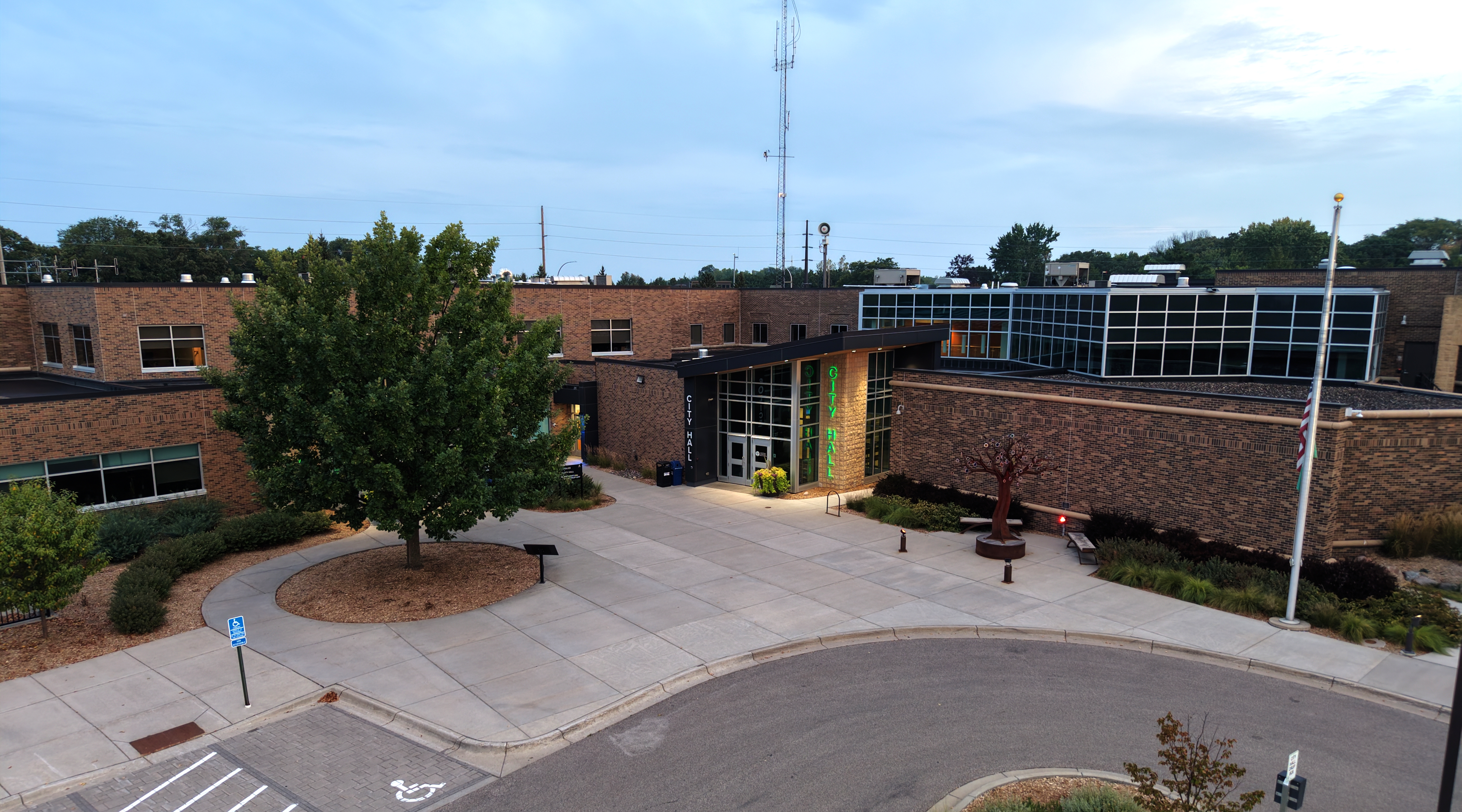
- Eagan City Hall

- Flag

- Location within Dakota County, Minnesota
- Coordinates: 44°49′04″N 93°10′01″W
- Country: United States
- State: Minnesota
- County: Dakota
- Established: 1860
- Incorporated: 1972
- Named for: Patrick Eagan

Government
  - Mayor: Mike Maguire

Area
  - City: 33.46 sq mi (86.66 km^{2})
  - Land: 31.18 sq mi (80.75 km^{2})
  - Water: 2.28 sq mi (5.90 km^{2})
- Elevation: 945 ft (288 m)

Population (2020)
  - City: 68,855
  - Estimate (2025): 67,105
  - Rank: US: 562nd MN: 13th
  - Density: 2,208.3/sq mi (852.64/km^{2})
  - Metro: 3,693,729 (US: 16th)
  - Demonym: Eaganites
- Time zone: UTC−6 (Central (CST))
  - Summer (DST): UTC−5 (CDT)
- ZIP Codes: 55121, 55122, 55123
- Area code: 651
- FIPS code: 27-17288
- GNIS ID: 0654525
- Website: cityofeagan.com

Eagan (/ˈiːɡɪn/ EE-ghin) is a city in Dakota County, Minnesota, United States. It is south of Saint Paul and lies on the south bank of the Minnesota River, upstream from its confluence with the Mississippi River. The population was 68,855 at the 2020 census. Eagan and the other nearby suburbs form the southern section of the Minneapolis–Saint Paul area.

== History ==
Eagan was named for Patrick Eagan, who was the first chairman of the town board of supervisors. He farmed a 220-acre (0.89 km^{2}) parcel of land near the present-day town hall. Eagan (born 1811) and his wife Margaret Twohy (born 1816) emigrated from County Tipperary, Ireland to Troy, New York, where they married in 1843. They arrived in Mendota circa 1853–54, before settling in the Eagan area.

Eagan was settled as an Irish farming community and "Onion Capital of the United States". Its largest growth took place after Highway 77 was relocated and expanded and a six-lane bridge (with three northbound and three southbound lanes) was constructed over the Minnesota River in 1980 and the final Interstate 35E freeway section southbound from Minnesota State Highway 110 in Mendota Heights to the area where it joins 35W in Burnsville was completed in the mid-1980s. Eagan's northern border is mostly along Interstate 494. Its southern border is about a mile south of Cliff Road. Its eastern border runs mostly along Minnesota State Highway 3. The western border runs mostly along the Minnesota River's south bank.

The city was visited by the "20th hijacker" of the September 11 attacks, Zacarias Moussaoui, before the attacks. Moussaoui attempted to complete flight training school, but was ultimately refused service by a local resident.

In February 2026, Eagan's city council placed a one-year ban on the construction of new data centers and cryptocurrency mining operations after residents expressed concerns about data center water and electricity use. The ban restricts centers that would use more than 20 megawatts of electricity within 500 feet of homes. Eagan had four data centers active or in development before the ban, all under 20 megawatts of electricity use. Eagan was the first city in Minnesota to pass such a ban. In response, data center owner Eagan Capital sued the city in June 2026, claiming the city did not have the authority to regulate electricity usage, and that such authority lies solely with the Minnesota Public Utilities Commission.

== Geography ==
According to the United States Census Bureau, the city has a total area of 33.43 square miles (86.58 km^{2}), of which 31.12 square miles (80.60 km^{2}) is land and 2.31 square miles (5.98 km^{2}) is water.

Interstate Highway 35E, Interstate Highway 494, Minnesota Highways 13, 55, 77, and 149 are six of Eagan's main routes.

The Eagan Core Greenway is an ongoing project to preserve Eagan's environmentally sensitive green space, with particular emphasis on Patrick Eagan Park and the two-mile (3 km) greenway connecting the park with Lebanon Hills Regional Park.

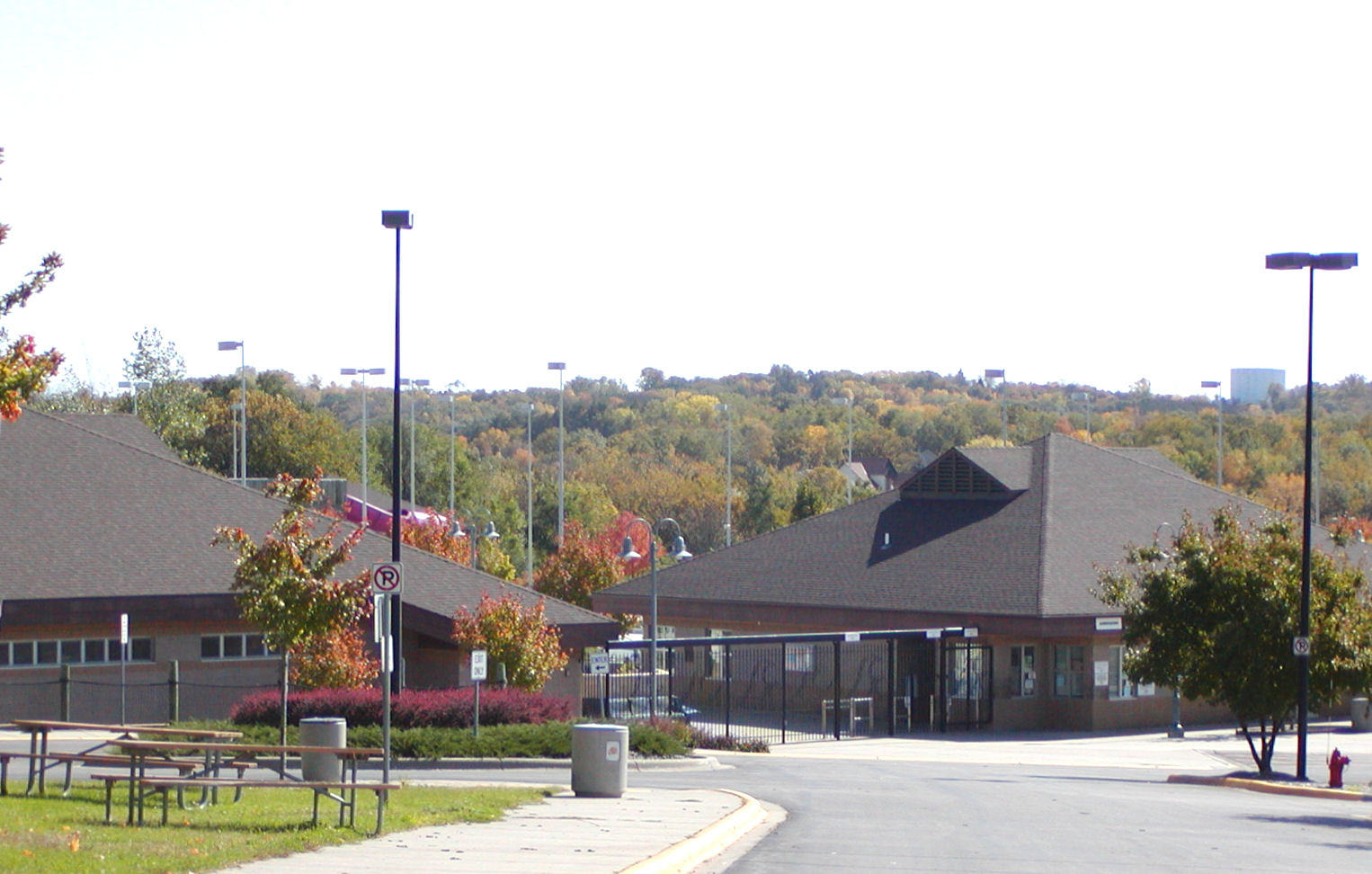
Cascade Bay

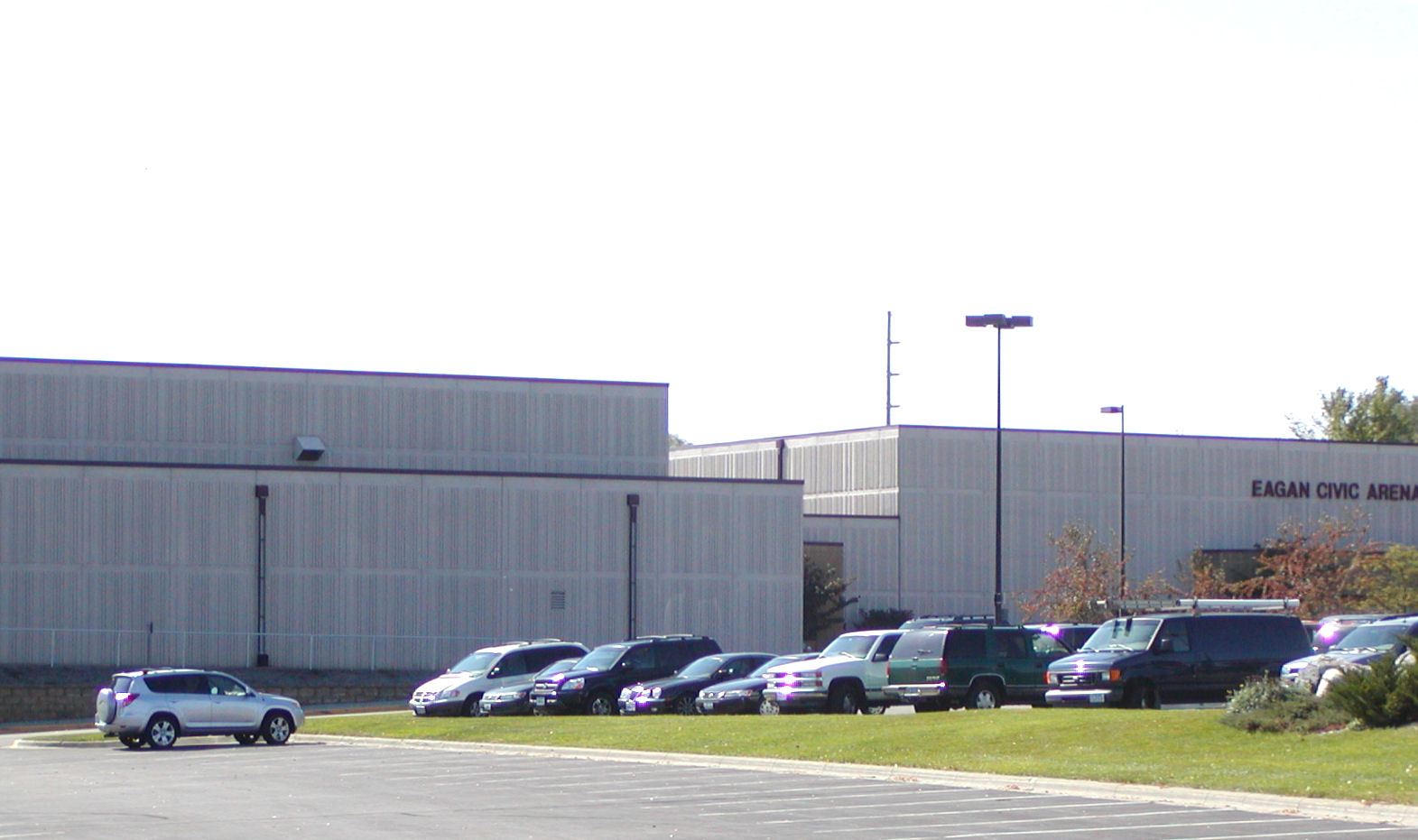
Civic Arena

== Demographics ==
Historical population
Census	Pop.	Note	%±
1860	565		—
1870	670		18.6%
1880	645		−3.7%
1890	743		15.2%
1900	898		20.9%
1910	899		0.1%
1920	857		−4.7%
1930	852		−0.6%
1940	915		7.4%
1950	1,185		29.5%
1960	3,382		185.4%
1970	10,398		207.5%
1980	20,700		99.1%
1990	47,409		129.0%
2000	63,557		34.1%
2010	64,206		1.0%
2020	68,855		7.2%
2022 (est.)	67,534		−1.9%
U.S. Decennial Census; 2020 Census

=== 2020 census ===
As of the 2020 census, Eagan had a population of 68,855. The median age was 39.1 years. 22.3% of residents were under the age of 18 and 14.3% of residents were 65 years of age or older. For every 100 females there were 95.0 males, and for every 100 females age 18 and over there were 92.4 males age 18 and over.

99.1% of residents lived in urban areas, while 0.9% lived in rural areas.

There were 27,609 households in Eagan, of which 29.9% had children under the age of 18 living in them. Of all households, 52.9% were married-couple households, 15.6% were households with a male householder and no spouse or partner present, and 24.5% were households with a female householder and no spouse or partner present. About 26.5% of all households were made up of individuals and 9.3% had someone living alone who was 65 years of age or older.

There were 28,383 housing units, of which 2.7% were vacant. The homeowner vacancy rate was 0.4% and the rental vacancy rate was 4.6%.

Racial composition as of the 2020 census
Race	Number	Percent
White	49,057	71.2%
Black or African American	6,404	9.3%
American Indian and Alaska Native	303	0.4%
Asian	6,557	9.5%
Native Hawaiian and Other Pacific Islander	24	0.0%
Some other race	1,856	2.7%
Two or more races	4,654	6.8%
Hispanic or Latino (of any race)	4,204	6.1%

=== 2010 census ===
As of the census of 2010, there were 64,206 people, 25,249 households, and 16,884 families living in the city. The population density was 2,063.2 inhabitants per square mile (796.6/km^{2}). There were 26,414 housing units at an average density of 848.8 units per square mile (327.7 units/km^{2}). The racial makeup of the city was 81.5% White, 5.6% African American, 0.3% Native American, 7.9% Asian, 1.7% from other races, and 3.0% from two or more races. Hispanic or Latino of any race were 4.5% of the population.

There were 25,249 households, of which 35.3% had children under the age of 18 living with them, 54.3% were married couples living together, 9.0% had a female householder with no husband present, 3.6% had a male householder with no wife present, and 33.1% were non-families. Of all households 25.9% were made up of individuals, and 5.6% had someone living alone who was 65 years of age or older. The average household size was 2.54 and the average family size was 3.10.

The median age in the city was 36.8 years. Of residents 25.5% were under the age of 18; 8.2% were between the ages of 18 and 24; 28.1% were from 25 to 44; 30.9% were from 45 to 64; and 7.6% were 65 years of age or older. The gender makeup of the city was 49.1% male and 50.9% female.

== Economy ==
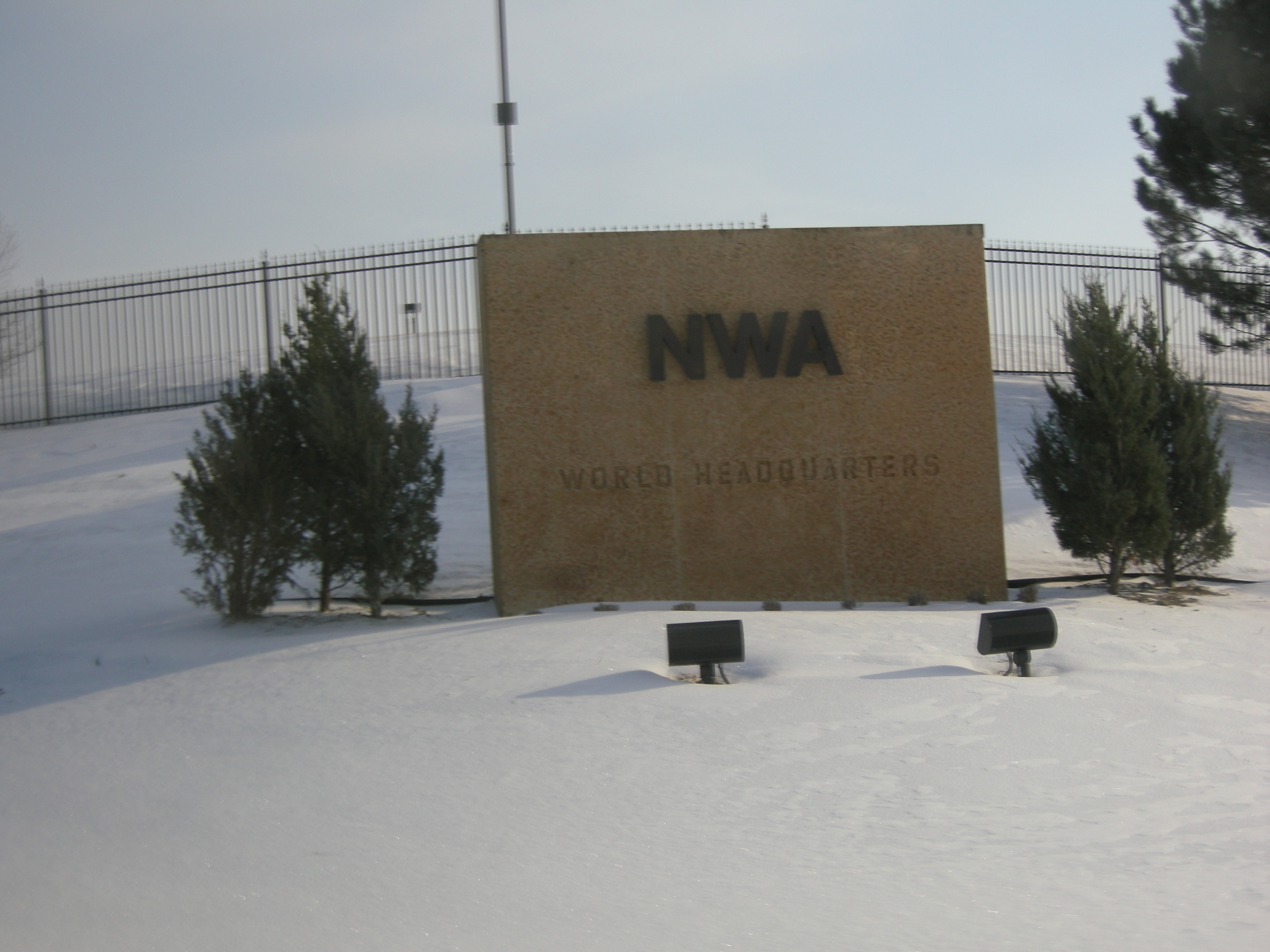
Northwest Airlines headquarters in Eagan, now site of the Minnesota Vikings practice facilities

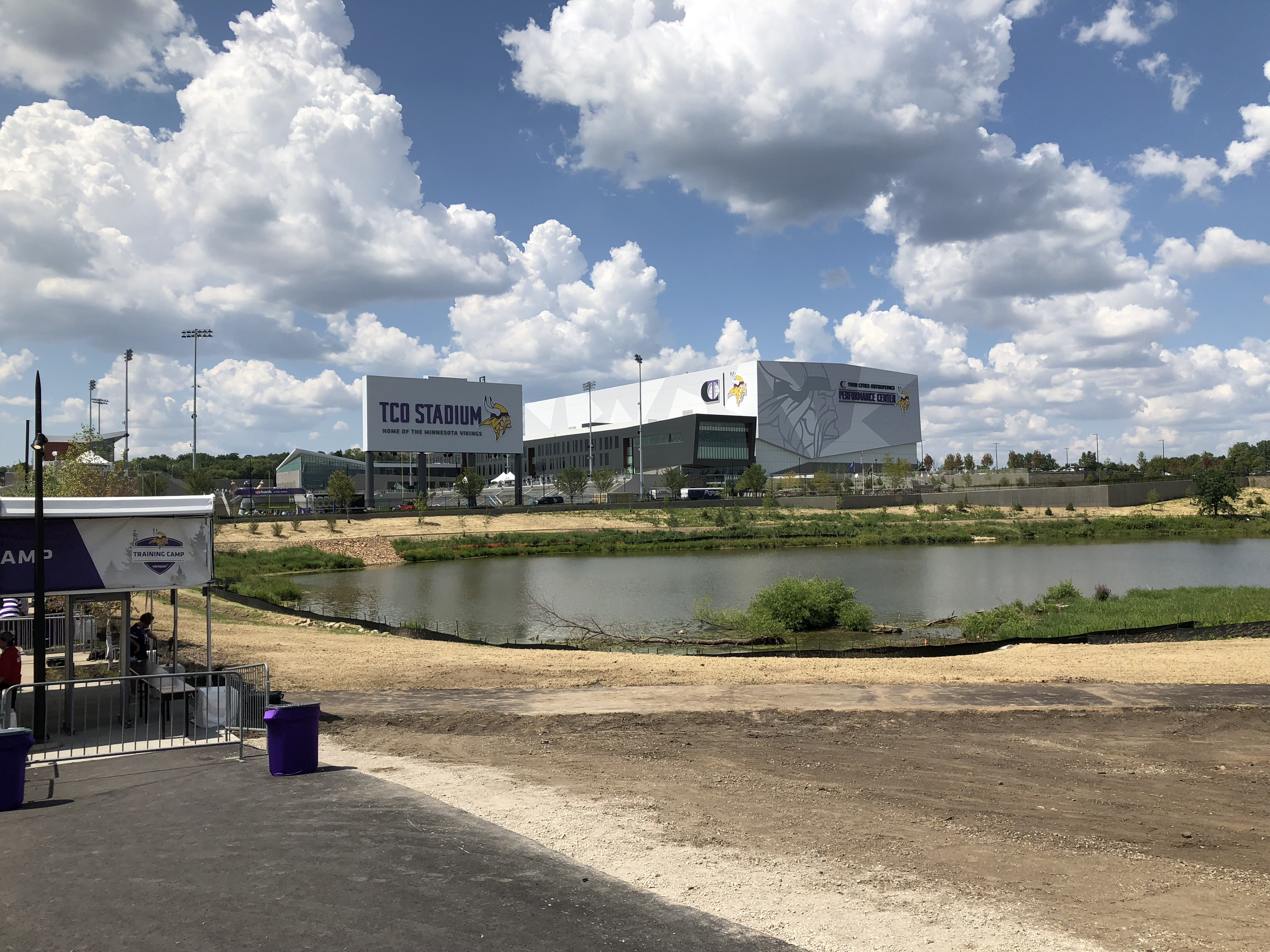
Twin Cities Orthopedics Performance Center, home of the Minnesota Vikings practice facilities

Eagan is home to legal publisher West, part of Thomson Reuters (5,000 Eagan based employees), Blue Cross Blue Shield of Minnesota (3,900 employees), Scantron, and Coca-Cola's Midwest bottling facility (900 employees). The sparsely populated northern portions of the city, being convenient to freeways and MSP Airport, are also home to a number of warehouses and distribution centers, including Minnesota's largest UPS hub (1,400 employees).

Regional Elite Airline Services, Universal Cooperatives and Buffets, Inc. are also headquartered in Eagan.

Northwest Airlines had its headquarters in Eagan. After Northwest merged with Delta, the Northwest headquarters was disestablished. Todd Klingel, president of the Minneapolis Regional Chamber of Commerce, said that losing Northwest, a Fortune 500 company, would be "certainly a blow." He added, "But it's been expected for so long. Let's get on with it. The key is what can we do to minimize the loss to Minnesota." Mesaba Airlines employed around 1,830 people when it closed in 2011.

The Minnesota Vikings relocated their headquarters from Eden Prairie to Eagan, at the site of the former Northwest Airlines headquarters. The complex can be seen from Interstate 494. and is also home to the Twin Cities Orthopedics Performance Center, which serves as the Minnesota Vikings Training Facility. The facility is 277,000 square feet and includes an outdoor field that seats 6,500 fans. Fans can tour the facility or watch the daily activities on one of the six live action cameras around the stadium.

=== Top employers ===
According to Eagan's 2025 Comprehensive Annual Financial Report, its top employers were:

#	Employer	# of Employees
1	Thomson Reuters	4,500
2	BlueCross/BlueShield of Minnesota	3,000
3	United States Postal Service	2,100 (estimated)
3	Prime Therapeutics	2,100
5	United Parcel Service	1,500
6	Ecolab	1,400
7	ISD 196, Rosemount-Apple Valley-Eagan	1,075
8	Coca-Cola Bottling	750
9	Minnesota Vikings	497
10	City of Eagan	491

== Government and politics ==
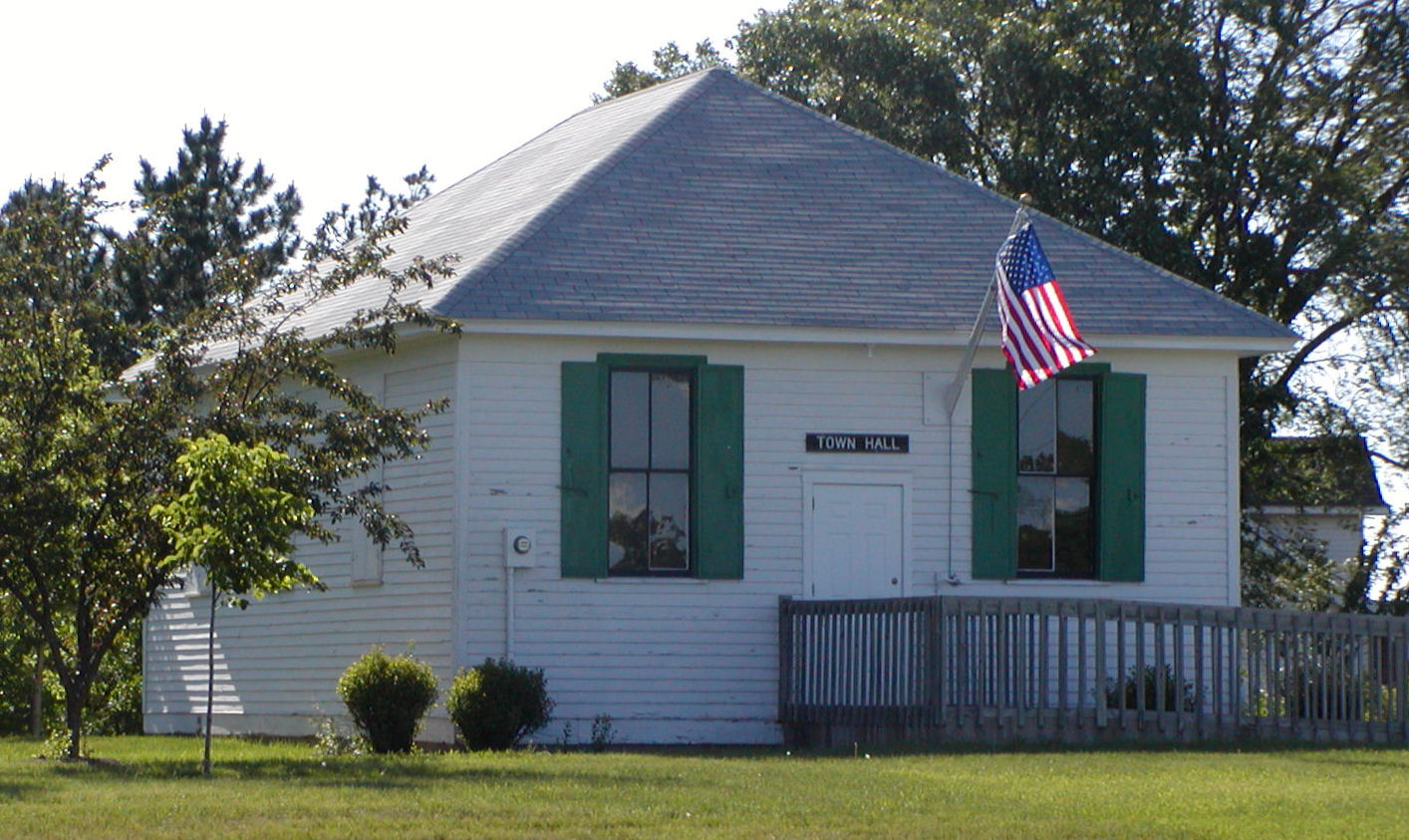
1914 Town Hall (now a museum)

Eagan's municipal government is a Plan A Statutory City, which provides for a council size of five members, one of whom is the mayor. Eagan's mayor since 2007 has been Mike Maguire.

In general, city government is nonpartisan. Candidates need not be (and usually are not) selected or endorsed by political parties, and no such endorsement appears on the ballot by state law. All five council seats including the mayor are elected at-large in a general election every four years. Terms are staggered with two council members elected one election cycle and the other two and the mayor two years later. The non-mayoral seats are elected in pairs, giving voters the chance to vote for up to two candidates. If necessary, races are narrowed down during a primary election.

As a part of Dakota County, Eagan's northern and western precincts join with regions northward to form the Third District on the County Commission. It has been represented by Laurie Halverson since 2021. The southern and eastern portions of the city are joined by regions south and east to form the Fourth District of the County Commission, which has been represented by William Droste since 2023. County commissioners serve four-year terms.

Eagan is in Minnesota's 2nd congressional district, represented by Angie Craig since 2019.

Since redistricting last took place, in 2022, Eagan straddles two Minnesota State Senate districts. Seventeen of Eagan's 18 precincts are joined with three precincts in neighboring Burnsville, four precincts in Mendota Heights, and the Village of Mendota to form Senate District 52, represented by Senator Jim Carlson (DFL). Eagan's southeastern most precinct is part of Senate District 56, represented by Senator Erin Maye Quade (DFL).

In the Minnesota House of Representatives, each senate district is divided into an "A" and a "B" side. The western half of District 52 makes up House District 52A, represented by Liz Reyer (DFL). The eastern half of District 52 makes up House District 52B, represented by Bianca Virnig (DFL). John Huot (DFL) represents precinct 18 as part of House District 56B.

Eagan is home to Minnesota's 39th governor, Tim Pawlenty, who previously represented Eagan in the Minnesota House and on the city council. Former mayor Patricia Anderson served as the 17th state auditor from 2003 to 2007.

Recently two city questions have gone to the ballot for city residents to vote on. In 2008, the citizens voted 53% to 47% to allow private development of a defunct golf course instead of having the City purchase the land for public development or open space. In 2004 and in 2007, voters were presented with plans drafted by an established Charter Commission calling for the city to scrap its current governing structure as a statutory city and adopt a new home-rule city charter. The measure failed 80% to 20% in 2004 and 91% to 9% in 2007. The Charter Commission was dissolved on June 18, 2008.

Eagan lies in Minnesota's First Judicial District.

Presidential election results

2024 Precinct Results Spreadsheet2020 Precinct Results Spreadsheet2016 Precinct Results Spreadsheet2012 Precinct Results Spreadsheet2008 Precinct Results Spreadsheet2004 Precinct Results Spreadsheet2000 Precinct Results Spreadsheet1996 Precinct Results1992 Precinct Results1988 Precinct Results1984 Precinct Results1980 Precinct Results1976 Precinct Results1968 Precinct Results1964 Precinct Results1960 Precinct Results
Year	Republican	Democratic	Third parties
2024	34.1% 13,970	63.3% 25,951	2.7% 1,092
2020	34.2% 14,444	63.2% 26,703	2.6% 1,086
2016	36.4% 13,977	53.8% 20,630	9.8% 3,776
2012	44.5% 17,193	53.2% 20,539	2.3% 891
2008	43.6% 16,461	54.6% 20,638	1.8% 676
2004	48.7% 18,010	50.3% 18,588	1.0% 380
2000	47.1% 15,510	47.4% 15,604	5.5% 1,839
1996	39.5% 10,947	50.7% 14,049	9.8% 2,738
1992	35.1% 9,905	39.5% 11,125	25.4% 7,155
1988	52.4% 10,679	47.6% 9,717	0.0% 0
1984	55.3% 7,492	44.7% 6,047	0.0% 0
1980	43.1% 4,303	43.3% 4,323	13.6% 1,357
1976	46.6% 3,914	50.9% 4,267	2.5% 211

== Education ==
=== Colleges and universities ===
- Rasmussen College

=== Primary and secondary schools ===
==== Public schools ====
Eagan is served by three school districts: Rosemount-Apple Valley-Eagan School District (Independent School District 196), West St. Paul-Mendota Heights-Eagan School District (Independent School District 197), and Burnsville-Eagan-Savage School District (Independent School District 191).

Some students choose to attend public schools in other school districts, as permitted under Minnesota's open enrollment statute.

The following schools in District 196 are in the Eagan city limits:

High schools

- Eagan High School

Middle schools

- Blackhawk Middle School
- Dakota Hills Middle School

Elementary schools

- Deerwood Elementary School
- Glacier Hills Elementary School
- Northview Elementary School
- Oak Ridge Elementary School
- Pinewood Community School
- Red Pine Elementary School
- Woodland Elementary School

One school in District 191 is in the city limits: Rahn Elementary School. The comprehensive high school for district 191 is Burnsville High School in Burnsville.

One school in District 197 is in the city limits: Pilot Knob STEM Magnet School (elementary school). Friendly Hills Middle School in Mendota Heights is the traditional middle school of District 197. The comprehensive high school for district 197 is Two Rivers High School (formerly Henry Sibley High School) in Mendota Heights.

==== Private schools ====
- Faithful Shepherd Catholic School (of the Archdiocese of Saint Paul and Minneapolis)
- Trinity Lone Oak Lutheran School
- Trinity at River Ridge

=== Public libraries ===
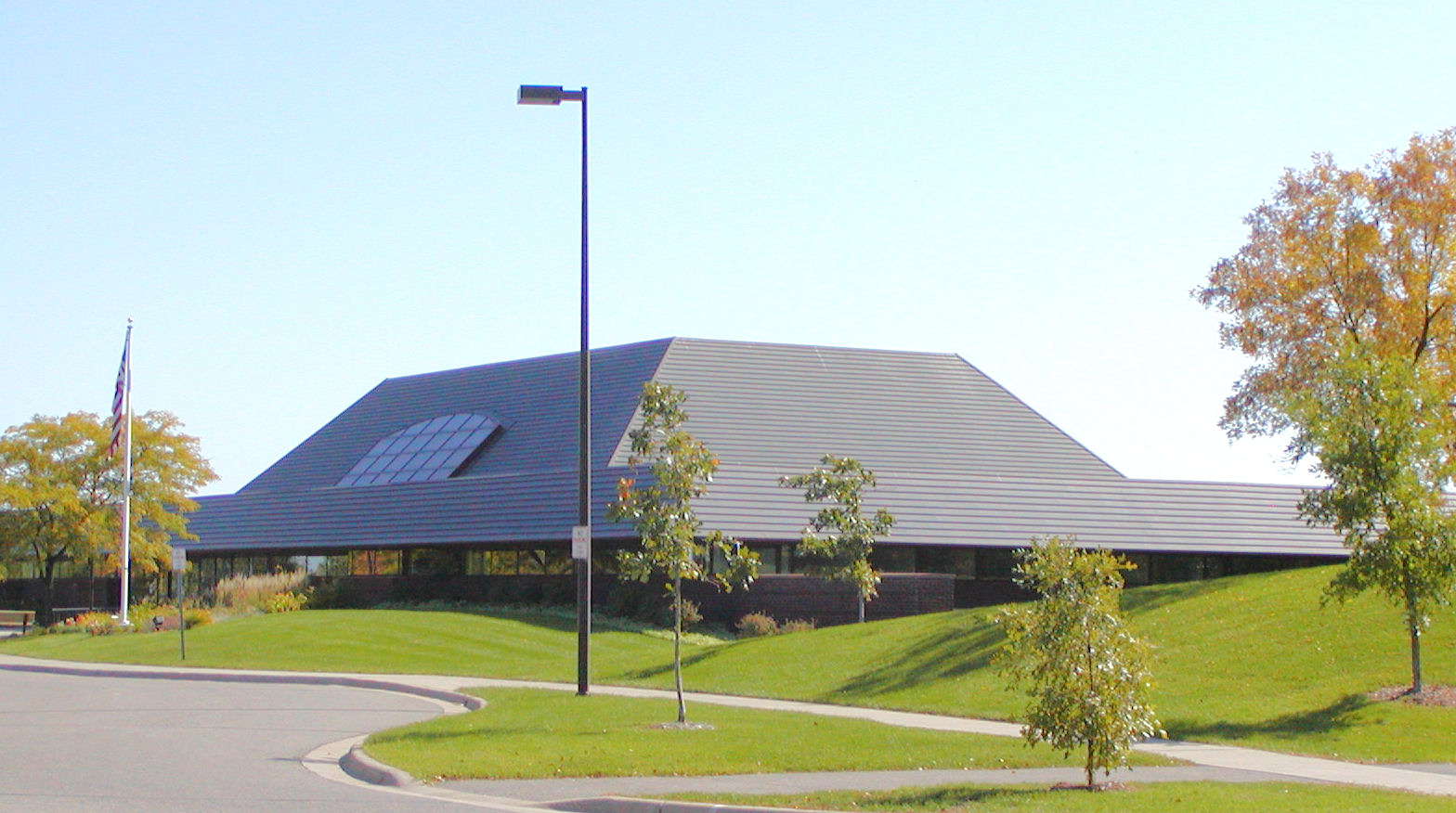
Wescott Library

The Dakota County Library operates the Wescott Library in Eagan. The library houses the headquarters of Dakota County Library.

== Sports ==
The Minnesota Vikings built the Twin Cities Orthopedics Performance Center, a training facility for year-round use that opened in 2018. It features a stadium and six practice fields. The Vikings have announced a partnership with the Minnesota State High School League to host competitions at the venue.

The USL W League's Minnesota Aurora FC began play in 2022, with its home matches at Eagan's TCO Stadium.

== Notable people ==
- Patricia Anderson, 17th Minnesota State Auditor and former mayor of Eagan
- Tim Commers, Minnesota state legislator and realtor
- Angie Craig, US representative for Minnesota's 2nd congressional district
- Natalie Darwitz, three time Olympic hockey player
- Nicholas David, American Soul singer and 3rd place finalist on NBC's The Voice
- Caroline Innerbichler, stage actress
- Laura Osnes, singer and actress
- Mary Anderson Pawlenty, First Lady of Minnesota and Judge of the District Court of Minnesota
- Tim Pawlenty, 39th Governor of Minnesota
- Mike Schneider, professional poker player
- Natalie Snodgrass, professional women's hockey player for the Seattle Torrent
- Doug Wardlow, Minnesota state legislator
- Tim Vakoc, former associate pastor of St. John Neumann Catholic Church and first U.S. military chaplain to die from wounds received in the Iraq War
- Kulap Vilaysack, actress, comedian, writer, director, and showrunner
- Zach Zenner, NFL running back for the Detroit Lions
- Ken Martin, Politician
