= Mendota, Minnesota =

City in Minnesota, United States

Mendota
- City
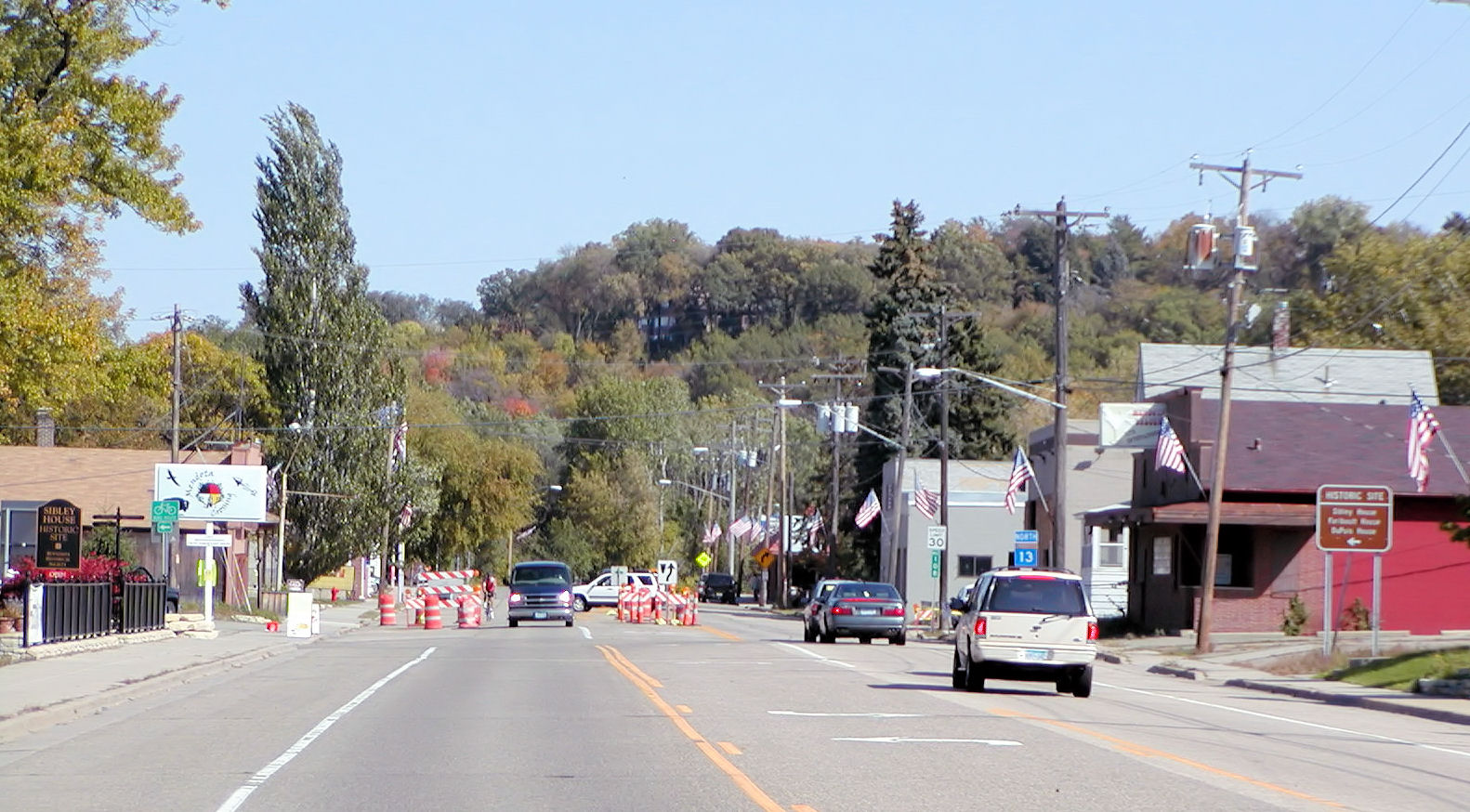
- Highway 13 in Mendota

- Location of the city of Mendota within Dakota County, Minnesota
- Coordinates: 44°53′8″N 93°9′38″W
- Country: United States
- State: Minnesota
- County: Dakota

Area
  - Total: 0.29 sq mi (0.76 km^{2})
  - Land: 0.27 sq mi (0.69 km^{2})
  - Water: 0.027 sq mi (0.07 km^{2})
- Elevation: 768 ft (234 m)

Population (2020)
  - Total: 183
  - Density: 691.0/sq mi (266.79/km^{2})
- Time zone: UTC-6 (Central (CST))
  - Summer (DST): UTC-5 (CDT)
- ZIP code: 55150
- Area code: 651
- FIPS code: 27-41678
- GNIS feature ID: 0647762
- Website: www.cityofmendota.org

Mendota (/mɛnˈdoʊtə/ men-DOH-tə) is a city in Dakota County, Minnesota, United States. The name is a mispronunciation of the Dakota word for the location, bdóte, which in Dakota tradition is the center of the world. The word in this use means "the confluence of the Minnesota and Mississippi Rivers," and generally "mouth or junction of one river with another." As of the 2020 census, Mendota had a population of 183.

== History ==
The town was one of the first permanent European-American settlements in the state of Minnesota, being founded around the same time as Fort Snelling. It is also the location of the Sibley Historic Site with two of the earliest known stone buildings in the State of Minnesota, the Henry Hastings Sibley house, the Faribault house, and other buildings associated with the American Fur Company, all dating from the 1830s, and the Dupuis House, the first red brick house in Mendota, built in 1854 by Hypolite Dupuis for his wife, Angelique (Renville) Dupuis and his large, growing Dakota mixed-blood family. Hypolite Dupuis arrived in Mendota sometime between 1840, and 1842 and began clerking for Sibley. The main route through the small city is State Highway 13, also known as Sibley Memorial Highway. Other roads in the city are mainly small unimproved roads.

The city of Mendota is home to the Mendota Mdewakanton Dakota Tribal Community, they are a non-federally recognized Indian community in Minnesota. They have sought federal recognition since 1996. They are a registered 501(c)(3). Their present community came into existence after the United States Congress passed appropriation acts for the "Sioux in Minnesota" in the 1880s and 1890s.

== Geography ==
According to the United States Census Bureau, the city has a total area of 0.30 square miles (0.78 km^{2}), of which 0.27 square miles (0.70 km^{2}) is land and 0.03 square miles (0.08 km^{2}) is water.

The city of Mendota is located at the confluence of the Mississippi and Minnesota rivers. The city is surrounded on three sides by the city of Mendota Heights. Fort Snelling State Park is nearby.

== Demographics ==
Historical population
Census	Pop.	Note	%±
1880	348		—
1890	248		−28.7%
1900	282		13.7%
1910	245		−13.1%
1920	193		−21.2%
1930	173		−10.4%
1940	228		31.8%
1950	243		6.6%
1960	259		6.6%
1970	266		2.7%
1980	219		−17.7%
1990	164		−25.1%
2000	197		20.1%
2010	198		0.5%
2020	183		−7.6%
U.S. Decennial Census

=== 2010 census ===
As of the census of 2010, there were 198 people, 78 households, and 52 families living in the city. The population density was 733.3 inhabitants per square mile (283.1/km^{2}). There were 82 housing units at an average density of 303.7 per square mile (117.3/km^{2}). The racial makeup of the city was 91.4% White, 1.5% African American, 1.5% Native American, 2.0% Asian, 1.5% from other races, and 2.0% from two or more races. Hispanic or Latino of any race were 3.5% of the population.

There were 78 households, of which 34.6% had children under the age of 18 living with them, 46.2% were married couples living together, 12.8% had a female householder with no husband present, 7.7% had a male householder with no wife present, and 33.3% were non-families. 26.9% of all households were made up of individuals, and 2.6% had someone living alone who was 65 years of age or older. The average household size was 2.54 and the average family size was 3.06.

The median age in the city was 37.8 years. 26.8% of residents were under the age of 18; 5.5% were between the ages of 18 and 24; 27.4% were from 25 to 44; 30.4% were from 45 to 64; and 10.1% were 65 years of age or older. The gender makeup of the city was 47.5% male and 52.5% female.

=== 2000 census ===
As of the census of 2000, there were 197 people, 80 households, and 48 families living in the city. The population density was 1,045.8 inhabitants per square mile (403.8/km^{2}). There were 80 housing units at an average density of 424.7 per square mile (164.0/km^{2}). The racial makeup of the city was 92.39% White, 1.52% African American, 2.03% Native American, 0.51% Asian, 0.51% from other races, and 3.05% from two or more races.

There were 80 households, out of which 33.8% had children under the age of 18 living with them, 35.0% were married couples living together, 16.3% had a female householder with no husband present, and 40.0% were non-families. 28.8% of all households were made up of individuals, and 7.5% had someone living alone who was 65 years of age or older. The average household size was 2.46 and the average family size was 3.08.

In the city, the population was spread out, with 25.9% under the age of 18, 7.1% from 18 to 24, 33.0% from 25 to 44, 23.9% from 45 to 64, and 10.2% who were 65 years of age or older. The median age was 36 years. For every 100 females, there were 126.4 males. For every 100 females age 18 and over, there were 124.6 males.

The median income for a household in the city was $45,938, and the median income for a family was $51,250. Males had a median income of $40,750 versus $26,250 for females. The per capita income for the city was $26,745. None of the families and 1.3% of the population were living below the poverty line.

== Education ==
It is in the West St. Paul-Mendota Heights-Eagan School District. The district operates Friendly Hills Middle School and Two Rivers High School (formerly Henry Sibley High School) in Mendota Heights, which are the traditional secondary schools for the entire district area.

== Notable people ==
- Timothy J. Corbett, first Roman Catholic bishop of the Diocese of Crookston
- Hypolite Dupuis, Clerk for Henry H. Sibley, arrived in Mendota in 1842.
- Jean-Baptiste Faribault, trader and early Minnesota settler
- Joseph Godfrey, only African American combatant in the Dakota War of 1862
- Henry H. Sibley, first governor of Minnesota, arrived in Mendota in 1835
