= Sunfish Lake, Minnesota =

City in Minnesota, United States

Sunfish Lake
- City
- Location of the city of Sunfish Lake within Dakota County, Minnesota
- Coordinates: 44°52′2″N 93°5′49″W
- Country: United States
- State: Minnesota
- County: Dakota

Area
  - Total: 1.67 sq mi (4.32 km^{2})
  - Land: 1.50 sq mi (3.88 km^{2})
  - Water: 0.17 sq mi (0.43 km^{2})
- Elevation: 971 ft (296 m)

Population (2020)
  - Total: 522
  - Density: 348.2/sq mi (134.45/km^{2})
- Time zone: UTC-6 (Central (CST))
  - Summer (DST): UTC-5 (CDT)
- ZIP codes: 55077, 55118
- Area code: 651
- FIPS code: 27-63544
- GNIS feature ID: 0652818
- Website: www.sunfishlake.org

Sunfish Lake is a city in Dakota County, Minnesota, United States. The population was 522 at the 2020. It was incorporated as a village in 1958.

== Geography ==
According to the United States Census Bureau, the city has a total area of 1.69 square miles (4.38 km^{2}), of which 1.52 square miles (3.94 km^{2}) is land and 0.17 square miles (0.44 km^{2}) is water.

The city is bordered by Highways 62 to the north, 3 to the east, 60th Street West/Peiper Road to the south and Delaware Avenue to the west. I-494 runs through the city with an exit at 3.

== Demographics ==
Historical population
Census	Pop.	Note	%±
1960	181		—
1970	269		48.6%
1980	344		27.9%
1990	413		20.1%
2000	504		22.0%
2010	521		3.4%
2020	522		0.2%
U.S. Decennial Census

Sunfish Lake is one of the wealthiest towns in America. The median home price in the city is over one million dollars.

=== 2010 census ===
As of the census of 2010, there were 521 people, 183 households, and 158 families living in the city. The population density was 342.8 inhabitants per square mile (132.4/km^{2}). There were 194 housing units at an average density of 127.6 per square mile (49.3/km^{2}). The racial makeup of the city was 94.4% White, 1.2% African American, 2.3% Asian, 0.6% from other races, and 1.5% from two or more races. Hispanic or Latino of any race were 4.8% of the population.

There were 183 households, of which 36.1% had children under the age of 18 living with them, 78.1% were married couples living together, 3.8% had a female householder with no husband present, 4.4% had a male householder with no wife present, and 13.7% were non-families. 12.0% of all households were made up of individuals, and 4.9% had someone living alone who was 65 years of age or older. The average household size was 2.85 and the average family size was 3.09.

The median age in the city was 48 years. 25.9% of residents were under the age of 18; 6.8% were between the ages of 18 and 24; 12.5% were from 25 to 44; 38.7% were from 45 to 64; and 16.1% were 65 years of age or older. The gender makeup of the city was 49.9% male and 50.1% female.

=== 2000 census ===
As of the census of 2000, there were 504 people, 173 households, and 147 families living in the city. The population density was 319.0 inhabitants per square mile (123.2/km^{2}). There were 178 housing units at an average density of 112.7 per square mile (43.5/km^{2}). The racial makeup of the city was 96.83% White, 2.58% Asian, and 0.60% from two or more races. Hispanic or Latino of any race were 2.78% of the population.

There were 173 households, out of which 42.2% had children under the age of 18 living with them, 78.0% were married couples living together, 5.2% had a female householder with no husband present, and 15.0% were non-families. 13.3% of all households were made up of individuals, and 6.9% had someone living alone who was 65 years of age or older. The average household size was 2.91 and the average family size was 3.20.

In the city, the population was spread out, with 30.0% under the age of 18, 4.4% from 18 to 24, 19.2% from 25 to 44, 32.1% from 45 to 64, and 14.3% who were 65 years of age or older. The median age was 43 years. For every 100 females, there were 90.9 males. For every 100 females age 18 and over, there were 91.8 males.

The median income for a household in the city was $148,410, and the median income for a family was $161,491. Males had a median income of $100,000 versus $55,714 for females. The per capita income for the city was $82,347. About 0.7% of families and 2.4% of the population were below the poverty line, including 1.4% of those under age 18 and 7.1% of those age 65 or over.

== Education ==
It is in the West St. Paul-Mendota Heights-Eagan School District. The district operates Friendly Hills Middle School and Two Rivers High School (formerly Henry Sibley High School) in Mendota Heights, which are the traditional secondary schools for the entire district area.

== Notable people ==
- Corbin Lacina, former American football player
- Vince Flynn, author
- Joe Mauer, former baseball player for the Minnesota Twins
- Mike McFadden, Republican politician
- T. J. Oshie, professional hockey player.
- Linval Joseph, American Football player
- T. J. Hockenson, American Football player
- Ann Bancroft, Antarctic explorer and former YMCA camp staff.
