= National Register of Historic Places listings in Dakota County, Minnesota =

Location of Dakota County in Minnesota

This is a list of the National Register of Historic Places listings in Dakota County, Minnesota. It is intended to be a complete list of the properties and districts on the National Register of Historic Places in Dakota County, Minnesota, United States. Dakota County is located in the southeastern part of the U.S. state of Minnesota, bounded on the northeast side by the Upper Mississippi River and on the northwest by the Minnesota River. The locations of National Register properties and districts for which the latitude and longitude coordinates are included below, may be seen in an online map.

Dakota County's historic sites convey the county's significant historical trends, including the settlement at Mendota, the homes of well-heeled residents of Hastings, the ethnic gathering places in South Saint Paul, and other sites related to life on the prairie, including religion, education, transportation, commerce, and the business of farming.

There are 39 properties and districts listed on the National Register in the county. A supplementary list includes four additional sites that were formerly listed on the National Register.

This National Park Service list is complete through NPS recent listings posted May 1, 2026.

== History ==
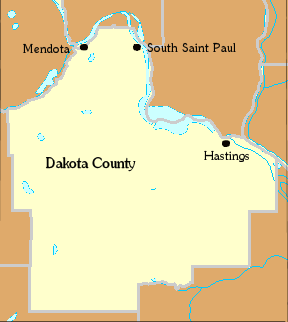
Dakota County

The earliest European settlement occurred on what is now Picnic Island, in 1819, where Colonel Henry Leavenworth built a stockade fort called "St. Peter's Cantonment" or "New Hope;" there materials were assembled for the construction of Fort Snelling, to be built on the bluff on the north side of the Minnesota River. Permanent settlement on the island was impossible due to annual flooding.

=== Mendota ===
The next significant white settlement occurred in the area known as St. Peters, now Mendota, where Alexis Bailey built some log buildings to trade in furs in 1826. Henry Hastings Sibley built the first stone house in Minnesota there in 1836, overlooking Fort Snelling across the river. Sibley was a partner in the American Fur Company, and considerable fur trade occurred at Mendota, where the Mississippi and Minnesota Rivers converge. By the time Minnesota achieved statehood in 1858, power and influence had shifted from Mendota, across the rivers to Saint Paul and Minneapolis.

=== Hastings ===
By this time and continuing into the 20th century, the hub of activity in the county was in Hastings, the county seat, and a focal point of transportation, communication, and commerce. Hastings is critically located on the Mississippi River at the confluence of the St. Croix River and on the Vermillion River, which provided ample water power. Commercial interests built substantial wealth among the businessmen who dealt in lumber, milling, and railroads as the county residents depended on them to sell their agricultural products and to provide the goods needed for a growing economy and rising standard of living.

=== South Saint Paul ===
Into the early twentieth century, the stockyards and meat-packing plants in South Saint Paul became historically significant, as they were the largest stockyards in the world; this is where ranchers in the vast countryside to the west brought their livestock for shipping to the hungry populations of St. Louis, Memphis, and New Orleans, downstream. These plants were worked by new immigrants from Romania, Serbia, and other Eastern European countries.

== Current listings ==
	Name on the Register	Image	Date listed	Location	City or town	Description
1	Daniel F. Akin House	Daniel F. Akin House	December 31, 1979 (#79001223)	19185 Akin Rd. 44°40′17″N 93°10′18″W	Farmington	Farmhouse built circa 1856 for pioneer Daniel F. Akin (1828–1909), whose daily official weather observations (continued by his descendants) provide an invaluable meteorological record. Also noted for its distinctive stone construction.
2	Caponi Art Park	Caponi Art Park	December 31, 1979 (#100012381)	1215 Diffley Rd. 44°48′21″N 93°09′05″W	Eagan	Locally unique, 20-acre (8 ha) sculpture park developed 1949–1994 by Anthony Caponi (1921–2015), with 37 contributing properties including his home, studio, and 30 outdoor sculptures. Now a public park.
3	Christiania Lutheran Free Church	Christiania Lutheran Free Church	May 28, 2010 (#10000301)	26690 Highview Ave. 44°33′46″N 93°14′15″W	Eureka Township	Church built 1877–78 and cemetery established in 1865, the last standing reminders of a vigorous "church war" among rival Lutheran denominations in a Norwegian American settlement.
4	Church of Saint Mary's-Catholic	Church of Saint Mary's-Catholic	December 31, 1979 (#79001233)	8433 239th St. E. 44°36′11″N 92°56′08″W	New Trier	1909 church associated with the German immigrants who almost exclusively populated southeastern Dakota County beginning in 1854.
5	Church of the Advent	Church of the Advent	December 31, 1979 (#79001225)	412 Oak St. 44°38′20″N 93°08′33″W	Farmington	1872 church based on the Carpenter Gothic designs published by Richard Upjohn; one of several small churches built in Minnesota under the leadership of Bishop Henry Benjamin Whipple.
6	Dakota County Courthouse	Dakota County Courthouse	July 21, 1978 (#78003069)	101 4th St. E. 44°44′34″N 92°51′07″W	Hastings	Courthouse built 1869–71 and renovated with a dome in 1912; noted for its Italianate architecture and association with Dakota County's government. Now Hastings City Hall.
7	District No. 72 School	District No. 72 School	December 31, 1979 (#79001236)	321st St. W. and Cornell Ave. (original address); Current coordinates are 44°24′58″N 93°12′35″W	Waterford Township	Intact and well-appointed example—built in 1882—of the small rural schools once common in 19th-century Dakota County. Later repurposed as a community hall. Moved to the Rice County Steam and Gas Showgrounds in 2022.
8	East Second Street Commercial Historic District	East Second Street Commercial Historic District	July 31, 1978 (#78003070)	E. 2nd St. 44°44′40″N 92°51′04″W	Hastings	Five-block commercial district with 35 contributing properties built 1860–1900, noted for its integrity and longstanding retail function.
9	Ignatius Eckert House	Ignatius Eckert House	July 21, 1978 (#78003071)	724 Ashland St. 44°44′19″N 92°51′24″W	Hastings	Exemplary Italianate house with cupola, built in Nininger in the early 1850s and moved to Hastings in 1857.
10	Exchange Bank Building	Exchange Bank Building	December 31, 1979 (#79001226)	344 3rd St. 44°38′22″N 93°08′44″W	Farmington	Best-preserved example—built in 1880—of the masonry commercial buildings constructed on Dakota County's Main Streets in the late 19th century as their first-generation wooden buildings were replaced.
11	Farmers Union Central Exchange Second Headquarters Building	Farmers Union Central Exchange Second Headquarters Building	May 18, 2021 (#100006585)	1185 Concord St. N. 44°54′31″N 93°03′01″W	South St. Paul	Exemplary mid-century modern office building, constructed 1955–57 with sympathetic 1963 and 1971 additions.
12	Fasbender Clinic	Fasbender Clinic	December 31, 1979 (#79001228)	801 Pine St. 44°44′17″N 92°51′45″W	Hastings	Medical clinic with an enveloping metal roof, built 1957–59; one of Minnesota's few late-career works by architect Frank Lloyd Wright.
13	First Presbyterian Church, Hastings	First Presbyterian Church, Hastings	July 7, 1995 (#95000822)	602 Vermillion St. 44°44′24″N 92°51′11″W	Hastings	Church built 1875–1881, designed by early Minnesota architect Charles N. Daniels as one of the state's first uses of Romanesque Revival architecture. Also noted for its association with Hasting's settlement by native-born New Englanders.
14	Fort Snelling	Fort Snelling	October 15, 1966 (#66000401)	Picnic Island; 44°53′08″N 93°10′41″W	Fort Snelling	Military complex established in 1819 and in use till 1946, instrumental in the development of the Upper Midwest and in the transition of the U.S. Army from a small frontier force into a major army. Primarily in Hennepin County.
15	Fort Snelling-Mendota Bridge	Fort Snelling-Mendota Bridge	December 1, 1978 (#78001534)	State Highway 55; 44°53′06″N 93°10′25″W	Mendota	4,119-foot (1,255 m) bridge constructed 1925–26, noted for its sophisticated design and original status as the world's longest continuous concrete arch bridge. Extends into Hennepin County.
16	Reuben Freeman House	Reuben Freeman House	December 31, 1979 (#79001231)	9091 Inver Grove Tr. 44°49′03″N 93°01′24″W	Inver Grove Heights	Unconventional house built circa 1875 with eight gables, noted for its unique vernacular design and rare use of coursed fieldstone.
17	Hastings Foundry-Star Iron Works	Hastings Foundry-Star Iron Works	December 31, 1979 (#79001229)	707 E. 1st St. 44°44′44″N 92°50′39″W	Hastings	Rare surviving example—built in 1859—of Minnesota's earliest industrial buildings, which manufactured engines and structural parts for steamboats, grain elevators, construction, and early automobiles.
18	Hastings Methodist Episcopal Church	Hastings Methodist Episcopal Church	June 7, 1978 (#78001531)	719 Vermillion St. 44°44′18″N 92°51′08″W	Hastings	1861 church significant for its eclectic blend of Greek Revival, Gothic Revival, and Italianate architecture and for its status as the oldest surviving church in Hastings.
19	Holz Family Farmstead	Holz Family Farmstead	May 24, 2007 (#07000459)	4665 Manor Dr. 44°47′16″N 93°06′56″W	Eagan	Family farm established in 1893, the last surviving remnant of Eagan's agricultural past, whose 10 contributing properties span the era's peak in the first half of the 20th century. Now a living farm museum.
20	Byron Howes House	Byron Howes House	June 15, 1978 (#78001529)	718 Vermillion St. 44°44′19″N 92°51′12″W	Hastings	House built 1868–70 for influential local banker and public official Byron Howes (1833–1886). Also noted as fine example of a towered style of Italianate architecture popularized by Andrew Jackson Downing.
21	Hudson Manufacturing Company Factory	Hudson Manufacturing Company Factory	January 12, 2021 (#100006002)	200 W. 2nd St. 44°44′41″N 92°51′13″W	Hastings	Factory complex built 1914–1946 by one of the nation's largest farm equipment manufacturers. Further emblematic of Hastings' early-20th-century industrial development.
22	Rudolph Latto House	Rudolph Latto House	May 23, 1978 (#78001530)	620 Ramsey St. 44°44′22″N 92°51′01″W	Hastings	House built 1880–81, noted for its transitional Italianate/Eastlake architecture. Now a bed and breakfast.
23	William G. LeDuc House	William G. LeDuc House	June 22, 1970 (#70000292)	1629 Vermillion St. 44°43′45″N 92°51′07″W	Hastings	Gothic Revival house built 1862–65 for early settler William G. LeDuc (1823–1917), remembered as a community developer, historian, Minnesota promoter, Civil War brigadier general, and prominent farmer. Now a museum and event venue.
24	Luther Memorial Church	Luther Memorial Church	August 4, 2025 (#100012054)	315 15th Ave. N. 44°53′41″N 93°03′12″W	South St. Paul	Church built in two phases 1956 and 1964; noted for its exemplary mid-century modern architecture and stained glass windows.
25	MacDonald-Todd House	MacDonald-Todd House	December 31, 1979 (#79001230)	309 W. 7th St. 44°44′21″N 92°51′21″W	Hastings	House built in Nininger in 1857 and moved to Hastings in 1866, noted for its successive ownership by two prominent local journalists—A.W. MacDonald and Irving Todd, Sr.—and for MacDonald's role in promoting the speculative townsite.
26	Mendota Historic District	Mendota Historic District	June 22, 1970 (#70000293)	Roughly bounded by government lot 2, State Highway 55, Sibley Highway, D St., and Minnesota River; 44°53′13″N 93°10′00″W	Mendota	Fur trading outpost that grew into Minnesota's first civil government seat; home of early leaders like Henry Hastings Sibley (1811–1891). Comprises three early houses and outbuildings constructed 1835–1854 (now the Sibley Historic Site) plus the 1853 Saint Peter's Church.
27	Minneapolis Saint Paul Rochester & Dubuque Electric Traction Company Depot	Minneapolis Saint Paul Rochester & Dubuque Electric Traction Company Depot	December 31, 1979 (#79001222)	County Highway 5 at 155th St. 44°43′22″N 93°17′54″W	Burnsville	Rare surviving example of a flag stop railway station, a simple open-fronted shelter built in 1910 on the Dan Patch Line to serve small produce farmers and early commuters.
28	Emil J. Oberhoffer House	Emil J. Oberhoffer House	December 31, 1979 (#79001232)	17020 Judicial Rd. W. 44°42′10″N 93°19′02″W	Lakeville	Lake home completed in 1918 for Emil Oberhoffer (1867–1933), founder and first conductor of the Minneapolis Symphony Orchestra. Also noted for its Prairie School design by Paul Hagen of Purcell & Elmslie.
29	Oheyawahi-Pilot Knob	Oheyawahi-Pilot Knob	March 14, 2017 (#03001374)	2100 Pilot Knob Rd. 44°52′49″N 93°10′02″W	Mendota Heights	Landmark river bluff significant as a long-serving Dakota gathering place, ceremonial site, and burial ground, signing site of the 1851 Treaty of Mendota, and backdrop to early Euro-American settlement at Fort Snelling.
30	Ramsey Mill and Old Mill Park	Ramsey Mill and Old Mill Park	July 15, 1998 (#98000872)	800 18th St. 44°43′35″N 92°50′29″W	Hastings	One of Minnesota's first commercial flour mills, built 1856–57, whose picturesque ruins left by an 1894 fire became an early tourist destination protected as a city park in 1925.
31	Saint Stefan's Romanian Orthodox Church	Saint Stefan's Romanian Orthodox Church	May 19, 2004 (#04000461)	350 5th Ave. N. 44°53′44″N 93°02′22″W	South St. Paul	1924 church, social and cultural anchor of a Romanian American community attracted by jobs in the local meat packing industry.
32	Serbian Home	Serbian Home	March 26, 1992 (#92000257)	404 3rd Ave. S. 44°53′07″N 93°02′16″W	South St. Paul	Meeting hall built 1923–24, social and cultural anchor of a Serbian American community attracted by jobs in the local meat packing industry.
33	Henry H. Sibley House	Henry H. Sibley House	January 10, 1972 (#72000676)	Willow St. 44°53′16″N 93°09′58″W	Mendota	1836 house of pioneer leader Henry Hastings Sibley (1811–1891), fur trading captain, U.S. Representative, state constitutional convention delegate, first state governor, and general during the Dakota War of 1862. Also a contributing property to the Mendota Historic District, and part of the Sibley Historic Site.
34	Stockyards Exchange	Stockyards Exchange	March 7, 1979 (#79001235)	200 N. Concord St. 44°53′36″N 93°02′06″W	South St. Paul	1887 base of operations for the nation's largest meat packing center at the turn of the 20th century. Also noted as South St. Paul's most architecturally significant building.
35	Thompson-Fasbender House	Thompson-Fasbender House	May 22, 1978 (#78001532)	649 3rd St. W. 44°44′34″N 92°51′45″W	Hastings	Ornate 1880 Second Empire house.
36	VanDyke-Libby House	VanDyke-Libby House	October 2, 1978 (#78001533)	612 Vermillion St. 44°44′22″N 92°51′11″W	Hastings	Leading example of Second Empire architecture, built in 1867.
37	Waterford Bridge	Waterford Bridge	August 26, 2010 (#10000580)	Canada Ave. over Cannon River; 44°29′15″N 93°07′42″W	Waterford Township	Rare surviving example of Minnesota's once-common camelback through truss bridges—built in 1909—and one of the state's oldest bridges with rigid rather than pinned connections.
38	George W. Wentworth House	George W. Wentworth House	December 31, 1979 (#79001237)	1575 Oakdale Ave. 44°53′55″N 93°04′20″W	West St. Paul	1887 Queen Anne house of local civic leader George Wentworth and a symbol of the area's transition from farmland to residential and industrial suburbs.
39	West Second Street Residential Historic District	West Second Street Residential Historic District	July 31, 1978 (#78003072)	W. 2nd St. 44°44′40″N 92°51′21″W	Hastings	Collection of 13 houses depicting each of the major architectural styles popular in Minnesota between 1850 and 1890, including Greek Revival, Italianate, Second Empire, and octagon house, along with several vernacular examples.

== Former listings ==
	Name on the Register	Image	Date listed	Date removed	Location	City or town	Description
1	Chicago, Milwaukee, St. Paul and Pacific Railroad Depot		December 31, 1979 (#79001224)	May 15, 1987	400 2nd St.	Farmington	1894 depot, demolished in 1984 as the Chicago, Milwaukee, St. Paul and Pacific Railroad went into bankruptcy.
2	Good Templars Hall	Good Templars Hall	December 31, 1979 (#79001234)	January 29, 2025	124th Street East (original address); Current coordinates are 44°37′52″N 92°50′16″W	Nininger	1858 meeting hall soon converted to a school, nominated as the only remaining example of the Greek Revival buildings constructed at a notable speculative townsite. Moved to the Little Log House Pioneer Village in 2005.
3	Horticulture Building	Horticulture Building	December 31, 1979 (#79001227)	March 15, 1993	County Highway 74; 44°37′48″N 93°08′45″W	Farmington vicinity	Exemplary 1918 county fair hall. Demolished in 1988 due to structural deficiencies but its octagonal dome has been preserved as a gazebo.
4	Jacob Marthaler House		October 27, 1988 (#88002136)	January 10, 1994	1746 Oakdale Avenue	West St. Paul	1863 Federal house of a founder of West St. Paul. Demolished by owner in 1993.

== See also ==
- List of National Historic Landmarks in Minnesota
- National Register of Historic Places listings in Minnesota
