= Nininger =

Nininger can refer to:

People

- Alexander R. Nininger, recipient of the Medal of Honor
- Harvey H. Nininger, meteorite collector

Place names

In the United States:

- Nininger, Minnesota, a former town
- Nininger Township, Dakota County, Minnesota
