= Horticulture Building =

The Horticulture Building may refer to:

- Horticulture Building (Minnesota), Dakota County Fair, Farmington, Minnesota, U.S.
- Horticulture Building (Toronto) in Exhibition Place, Toronto, Ontario, Canada
- Horticulture Building in Lansdowne Park, Ottawa, Ontario, Canada
