= Waterford Bridge =

- U.S. National Register of Historic Places
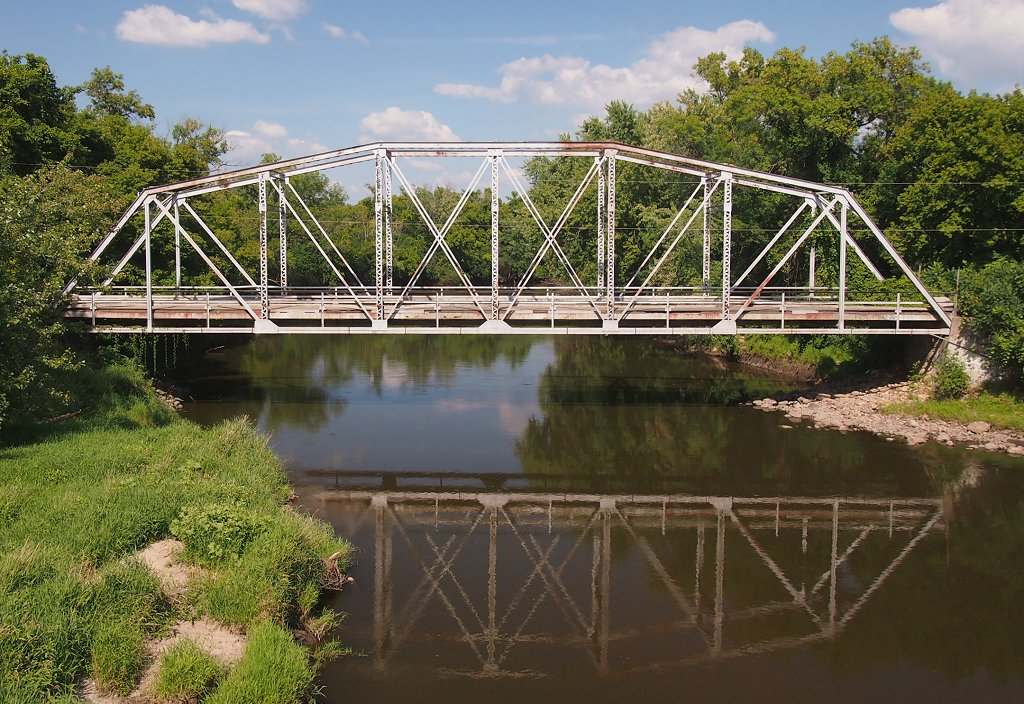
- The Waterford Bridge viewed from the southwest

- Location within Minnesota Location within the United States
- Location: Canada Avenue over the Cannon River, Waterford Township, Minnesota
- Coordinates: 44°29′15″N 93°7′42.5″W
- Area: Less than one acre
- Built: 1909
- Built by: Hennepin Bridge Company
- Architect: Charles A. Forbes
- Architectural style: Camelback through truss
- MPS: Iron and Steel Bridges in Minnesota MPS
- NRHP reference No.: 10000580
- Designated: August 26, 2010

The Waterford Bridge, formerly designated Bridge L0327 and now Bridge L3275, is a historic steel truss bridge over the Cannon River in Waterford Township, Minnesota, United States. It was constructed in 1909 and is one of the state's earliest surviving bridges to use rigid rather than pinned connections. Moreover, it is Minnesota's only known road bridge in which some of the rigid connections are fastened with bolts rather than rivets.

The bridge was listed on the National Register of Historic Places in 2010 for having state-level significance in the theme of engineering. It was nominated for being a rare surviving example of Minnesota's once-common camelback through truss bridges, and for its early and uniquely transitional rigid connections.

== Description ==
The Waterford bridge is a single-span, eight-panel, camelback through truss. It measures 140 feet (43 m) long with a 16-foot-wide (4.9 m) deck. The setting is rural, despite being just two miles (3.2 km) northeast of Northfield, Minnesota.

The Waterford Bridge is one of the few remaining camelback through trusses in Minnesota. The others that are also listed on the National Register of Historic Places are the Gateway Trail Iron Bridge, the Dodd Ford Bridge, and the Long Meadow Bridge.

== History ==
The Waterford Bridge was constructed in 1909. It replaced several fording points, including one just upstream from the bridge (roughly where its 1991 replacement is) The new bridge was designed by Dakota County engineer Charles A. Forbes and built by the Hennepin Bridge Company for $5,000. At the time most truss bridges were still being constructed with the structural members held together by pins. The builders of the Waterford Bridge opted for stronger rigid connections, even though this was not yet legally required except for state-funded projects. Unusually, though, many of these connections were made with bolts, a unique intermediate choice proceeding the transition to fully riveted bridges.

In the early 1980s the bridge was threatened by erosion and local citizens raised $40,000 to effect repairs. However, in 1991 the bridge was sufficiently deteriorated that it was closed to vehicular traffic and the road rerouted over a new bridge built nearby. In 2014 the southeast abutment was rebuilt again with a grant from the National Trust for Historic Preservation. The bridge was closed in 2018 due to safety concerns. All traffic is rerouted to the nearby Dudley Bridge.

== See also ==
- List of bridges on the National Register of Historic Places in Minnesota
- National Register of Historic Places listings in Dakota County, Minnesota
