= George Wentworth =

George Wentworth may refer to:

- George Wentworth (of Woolley) (1599–1660), English MP for Pontefract 1640–1642
- George Wentworth (of Wentworth Woodhouse) (1609–?), English MP for Pontefract 1640–1644
- George A. Wentworth (1835–1906), American teacher and author of textbooks

== See also ==
- George W. Wentworth House, a historic building in the U.S. state of Minnesota
- George Wentworth-FitzWilliam (1817–1874), British politician
- Wentworth (surname)
