= Ignatius Eckert House =

Historic house in Minnesota, United States

- U.S. National Register of Historic Places
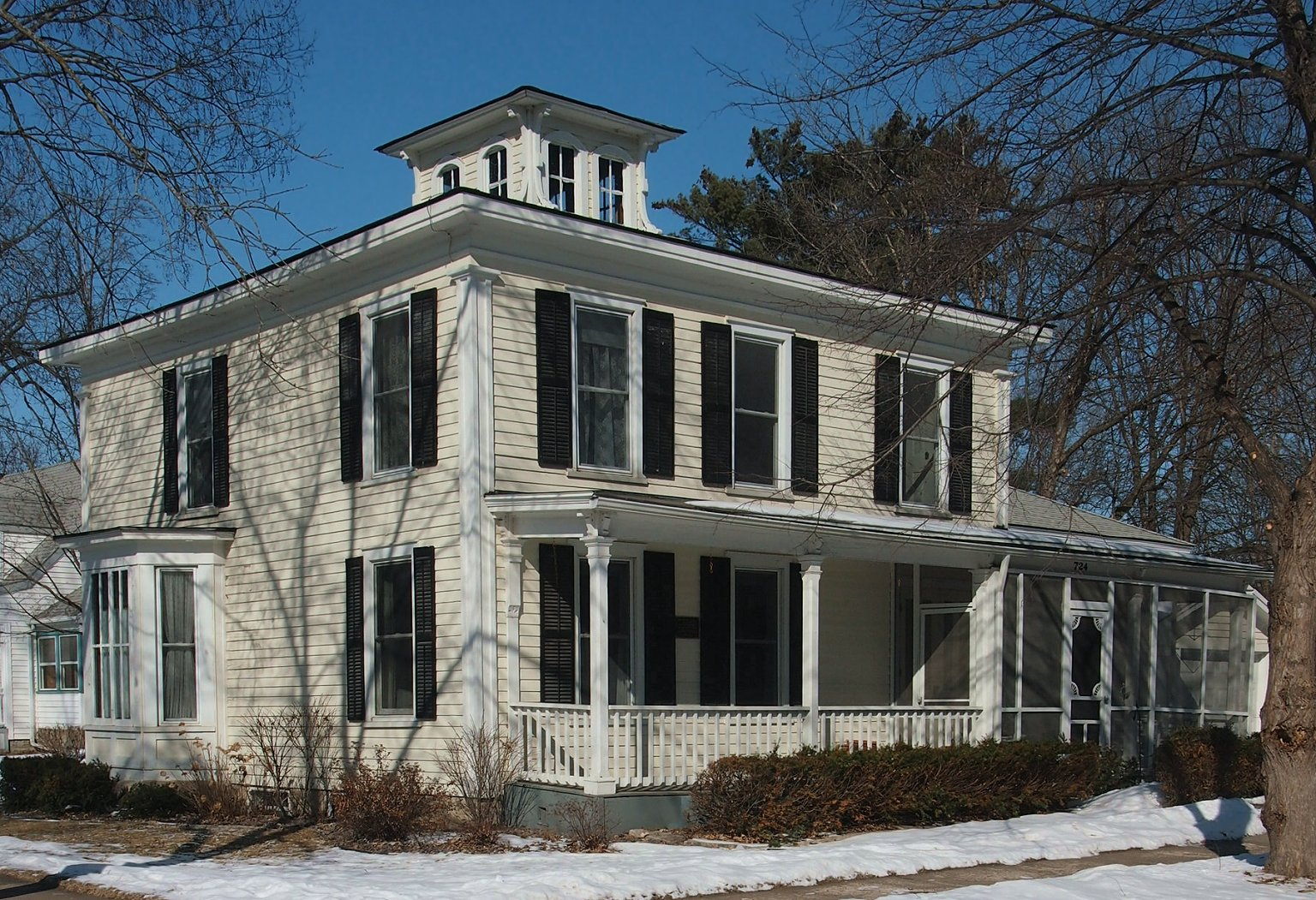
- The Ignatius Eckert House from the southeast

- Location within Minnesota Location within the United States
- Location: 724 Ashland Avenue, Hastings, Minnesota, United States
- Coordinates: 44°44′18.5″N 92°51′24″W
- Area: Less than one acre
- Built: 1850s
- Architectural style: Cupolated Italian Villa
- NRHP reference No.: 78003071
- Added to NRHP: July 21, 1978

The Ignatius Eckert House is historic house in Hastings, Minnesota, United States. It was built in Nininger, Minnesota, in the early 1850s and moved to Hastings in 1857 by then-owner Thomas Reed. The house is listed on the National Register of Historic Places for its local significance in architecture as an exemplary specimen of an Italian Villa-style house with a cupola. It is an example of the "Country Homes" style of Andrew Jackson Downing, a pioneer in American landscape architecture. The original owner, Reverend G. W. T. Wright, was a minister at the nearby Hastings Methodist Episcopal Church. Ignatius Eckert, a retired farmer, bought the home around 1909.

== See also ==
- National Register of Historic Places listings in Dakota County, Minnesota
