= Lawrence Speed =

Alabama politician

Lawrence S. Speed was a farmer and state legislator in Alabama during the Reconstruction era. He was one of five African Americans who represented Bullock County in those years. He was also a Union League organizer in Bullock County.

Speed was enslaved from the time of his birth in Georgia. He was an organizer in the Union League and served in the Alabama House of Representatives from 1868 to 1874. He was also a leader in the state militia.

== See also ==
- List of African-American officeholders during Reconstruction
