= Ignatius House =

Ignatius House may refer to:

- Ignatius Jesuit Centre, Guelph, Canada
- Ignatius House, a Jesuit spirituality centre at De Krijtberg, Amsterdam, Netherlands
- Squire Ignatius Haskell House, Maine, United States
- Ignatius Eckert House, Minnesota, United States
- Villa St Ignatius, Sliema, Malta

== See also ==
- Ignatius of Loyola
- Ignatius of Antioch
