= Rudolph Latto House =

Historic house in Minnesota, United States

- U.S. National Register of Historic Places
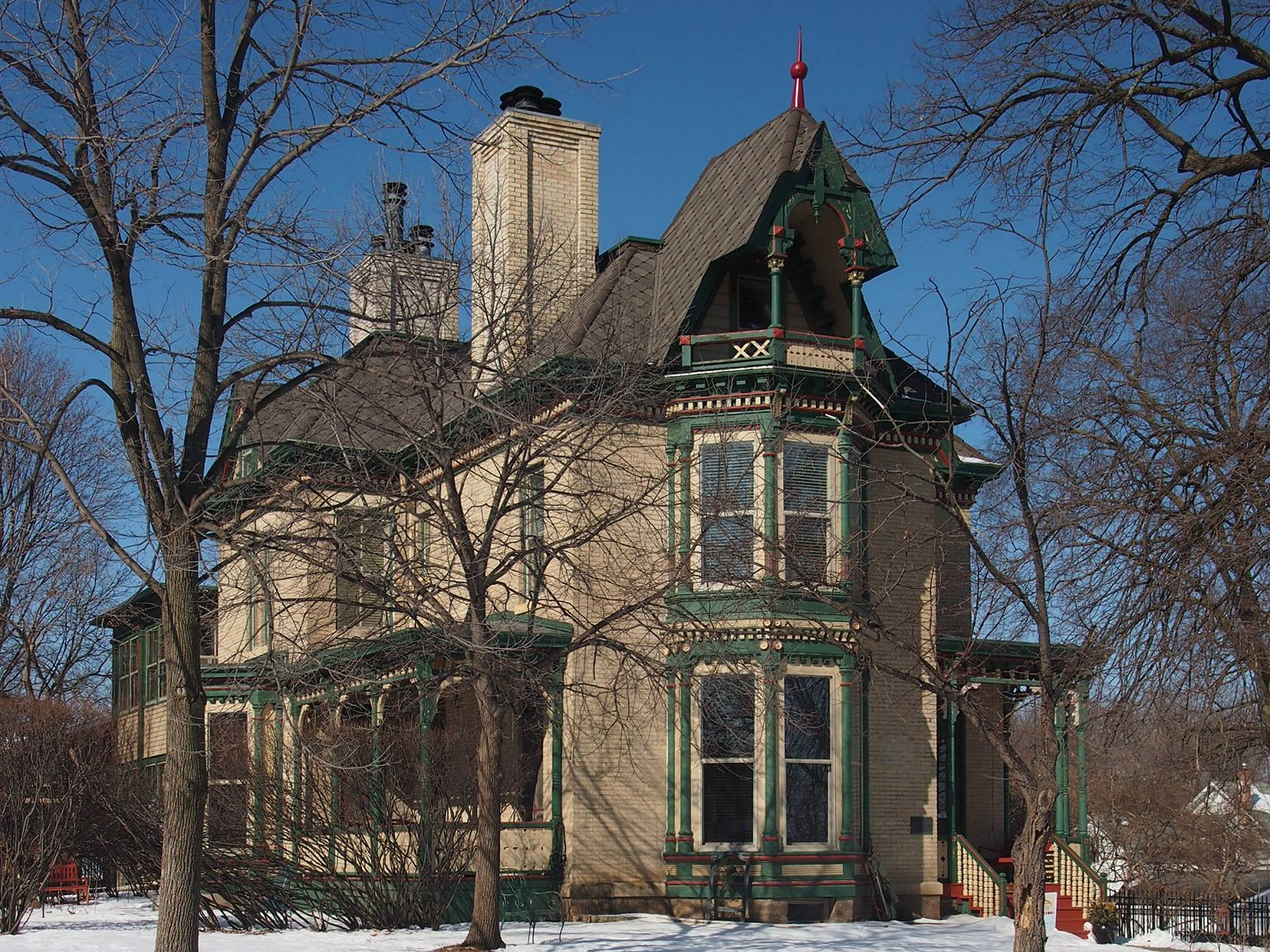
- The Rudolph Latto House from the southeast

- Location within Minnesota Location within the United States
- Interactive map showing the location of Rudolph Latto House
- Location: Hastings, Minnesota
- Coordinates: 44°44′22.3″N 92°51′1.4″W
- Area: Less than 1 acre
- Built: 1880–81
- Architectural style: Italianate/Eastlake
- NRHP reference No.: 78001530
- Added to NRHP: May 23, 1978

The Rudolph Latto House is a historic house in Hastings, Minnesota, United States, built 1880–1881. It is listed on the National Register of Historic Places for local significance in architecture for its transitional Italianate/Eastlake design. It was built in white Chaska brick.

== History ==
Rudolph Latto was a German immigrant who arrived in Hastings in 1856 and rose from poverty to wealth as a brewer, banker, hotelier, and grocer, affording him the means to build his grand home. Upon its completion in 1881 it also served as a gathering place for Germans in the area. When Latto and his wife died without issue, they donated the building to the city for use as a hospital. It served as such 1914–1949, then was used as a nursing home from 1949 to 1985. With the building by then in need of major restoration, the Hastings government approved its sale to a private party. The new owners completed a restoration and reopened the house in 1989 as a bed and breakfast inn. The same owners had previously converted the nearby Thompson-Fasbender House into a bed and breakfast. After an ownership change, the Latto House is now The Historic Inn on Ramsey Street.

== See also ==
- National Register of Historic Places listings in Dakota County, Minnesota
