= MacDonald–Todd House =

Historic house in Minnesota, United States

- MacDonald-Todd House
- U.S. National Register of Historic Places
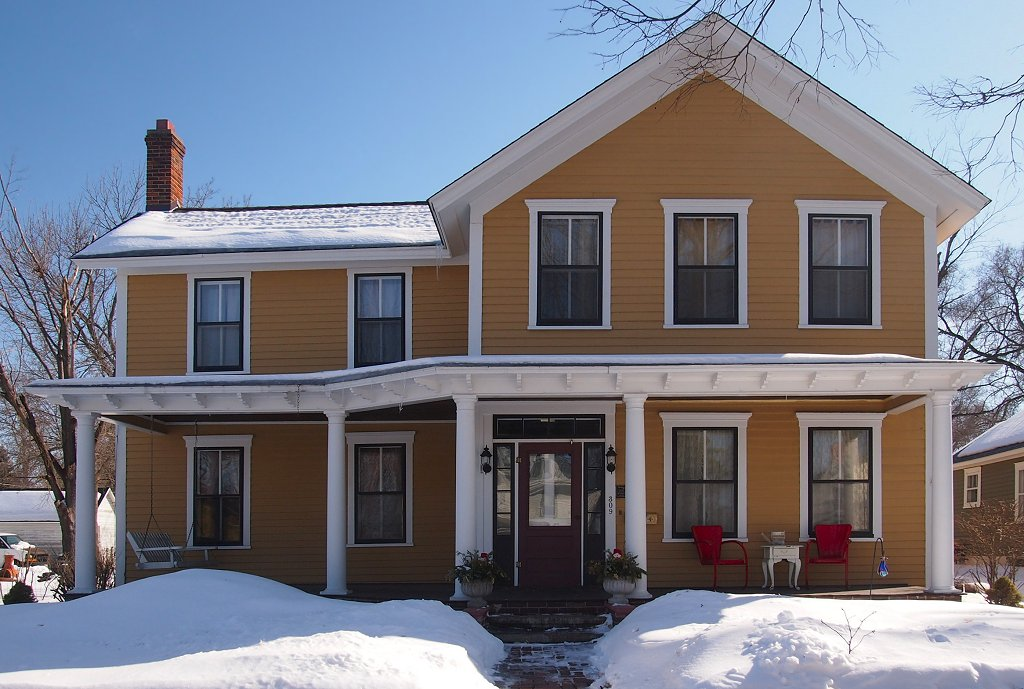
- The MacDonald-Todd House from the north

- Location within Minnesota Location within the United States
- Location: 309 Seventh Street West, Hastings, Minnesota
- Coordinates: 44°44′20.71″N 92°51′20.74″W
- Built: 1866
- Architectural style: Greek Revival
- NRHP reference No.: 79001230
- Added to NRHP: December 31, 1979

The MacDonald–Todd House is an 1857 home in Hastings in the U.S. state of Minnesota. The Greek Revival-style house was built by A.W. MacDonald in the utopian town of Nininger when he relocated to Dakota County from New York. He came to become the managing editor of the Emigrant Aid Journal. The paper was owned by Lieutenant Governor Ignatius Donnelly, who also founded the community of Nininger. In 1866, the home was moved across the ice in the Mississippi River to its present location, by Irving Todd, who had bought it for $385.
