= Serbian Home =

- U.S. National Register of Historic Places
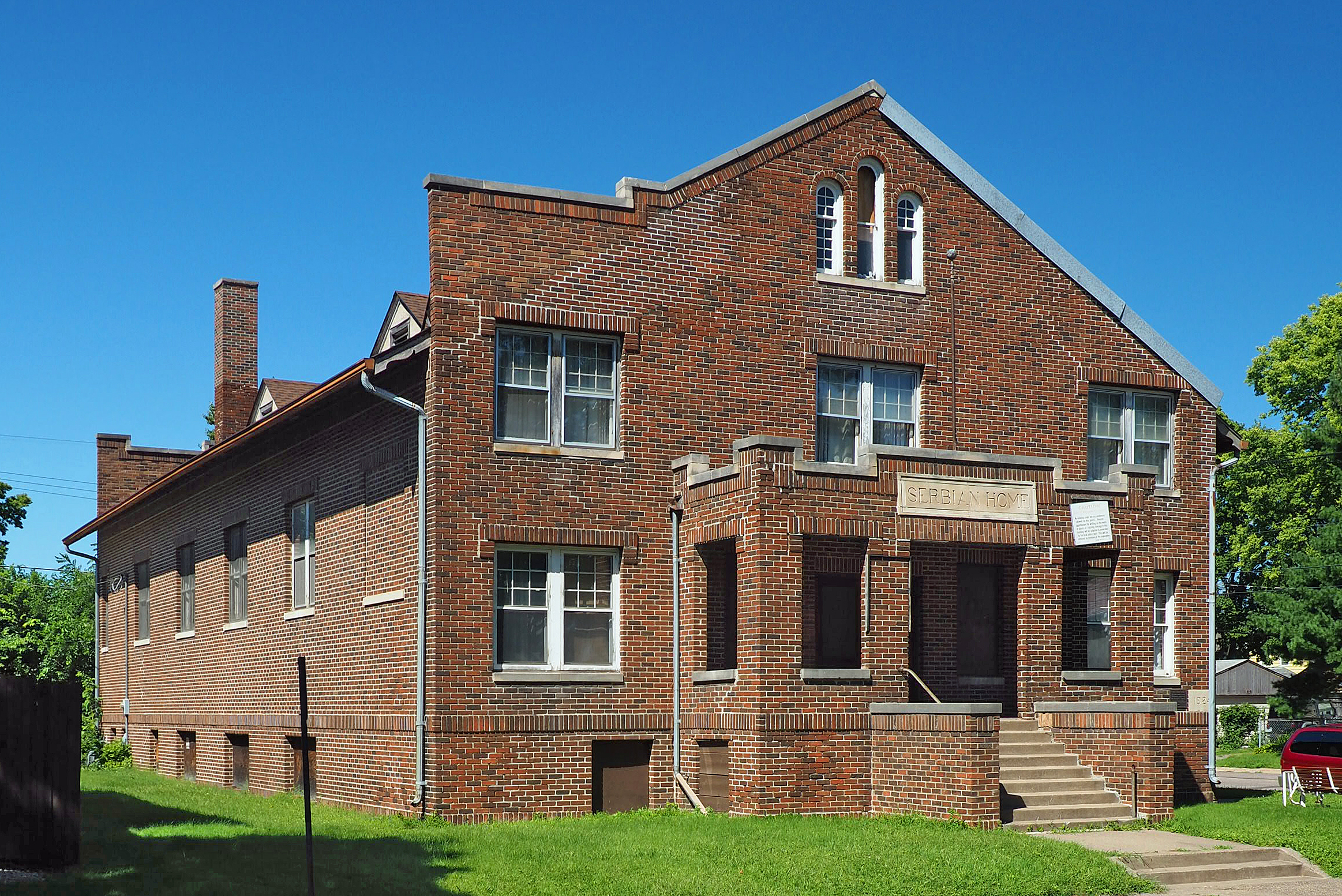
- The Serbian Home from the east-southeast

- Location within Minnesota Location within the United States
- Location: 405 3rd Avenue S., South St. Paul, Minnesota
- Coordinates: 44°53′5″N 93°2′15″W
- Built: 1923–24
- Architect: Anthony Mleczko
- NRHP reference No.: 92000257
- Added to NRHP: March 26, 1992

The Serbian Home is a two-story brick building, cultural and historic center in South Saint Paul, Minnesota. It was built in 1924 and functioned as a meeting place and community center for Serbian immigrants who worked in the meatpacking industry. The building served as a site for weddings, social gatherings, and religious services until a Serbian Orthodox Church opened nearby in 1953.

Over decades, the building hosted social events such as weddings and dances for various ethnic groups who settled in the city, including immigrants from Romania, Croatia, Serbia, and Poland. The Serbian Home eventually lost its liquor license, accumulated debt, and saw a decline in use during the later twentieth century. After periods of vacancy and attempts by a developer to tear it down to build condominiums, a nonprofit acquired the Serbian Home in 1996 and operated it as the Serbian Cultural and History Center, a cultural and history museum with artifacts and documents about Serbian families and other immigrants in South St. Paul. Activity at the center was limited by city ordinances related to parking and event size. Despite efforts, the center did not attract sustained interest from local residents or the wider Serbian community, and it was rarely visited.

In 2018, Aleksandar Stojmenovic, an immigrant from Serbia, purchased the building from the nonprofit. He invested in repairs and received approval from the city to run the Serbian Home as an event venue and cultural center.
