= Hastings City Hall =

- Dakota County Courthouse
- U.S. National Register of Historic Places
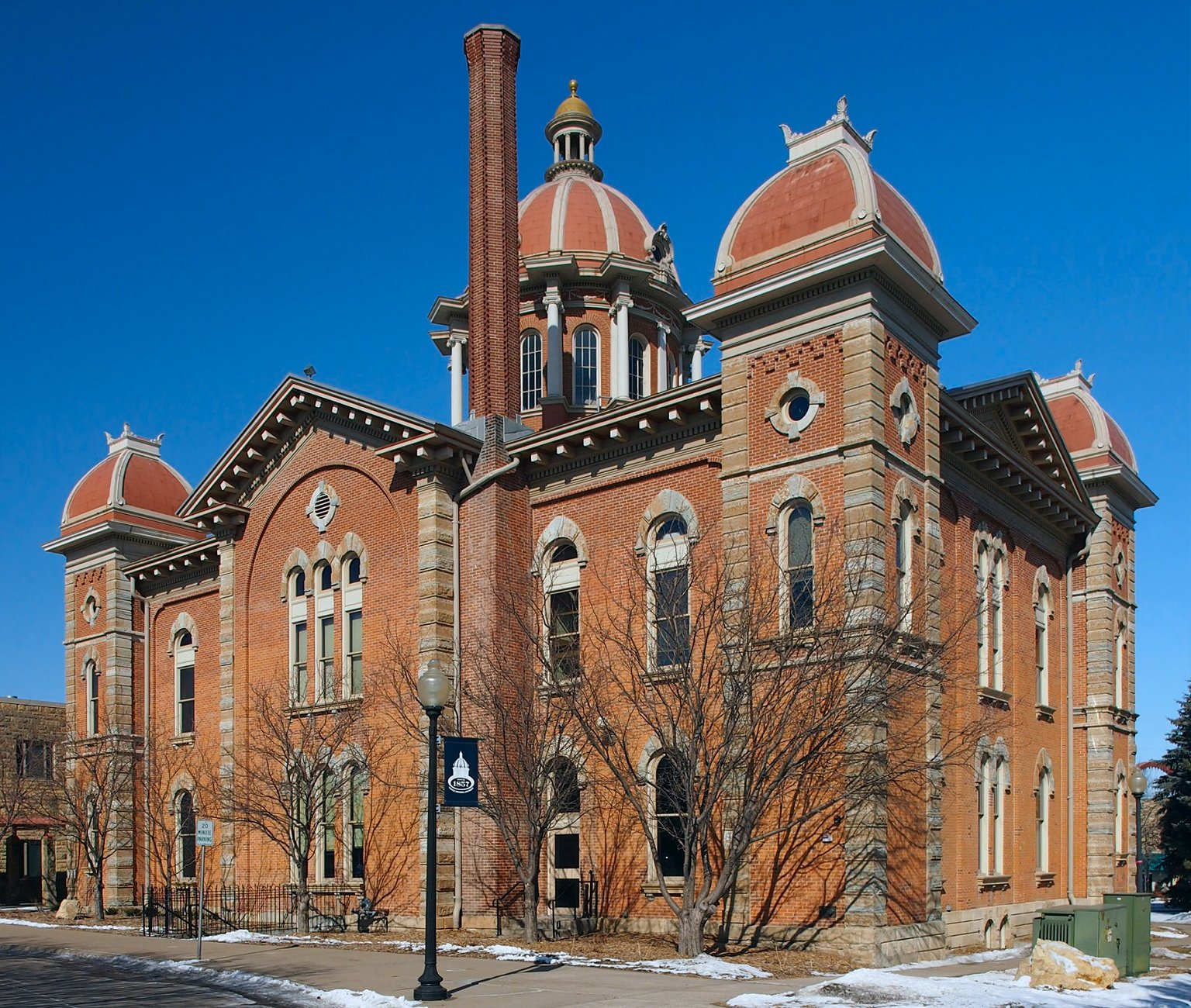
- Hastings City Hall from the southeast

- Location within Minnesota Location within the United States
- Location: 101 4th Street East, Hastings, Minnesota
- Coordinates: 44°44′33.7″N 92°51′6.7″W
- Built: 1869–71
- Architect: A.M. Radcliff
- Architectural style: Italian Villa, Romanesque
- NRHP reference No.: 78003069
- Added to NRHP: July 21, 1978

Hastings City Hall, formerly the Dakota County Courthouse, is a historic government building in Hastings, Minnesota, United States, completed in 1871. It was the original courthouse for Dakota County and now serves as city hall. It was designed by A.M. Radcliff, one of Minnesota's first architects, in an Italian Villa style. Although an addition built in 1955 in an entirely different style damaged the building's integrity, the building remains a prominent structure in downtown Hastings. The courthouse served as the seat of Dakota County government from 1871 until September 1974, when the county commissioners held their last meeting in the building. It became the Hastings City Hall in 1993.

== See also ==
- National Register of Historic Places listings in Dakota County, Minnesota
