= St. Stefan's Romanian Orthodox Church =

Historic church in Minnesota, United States

- U.S. National Register of Historic Places
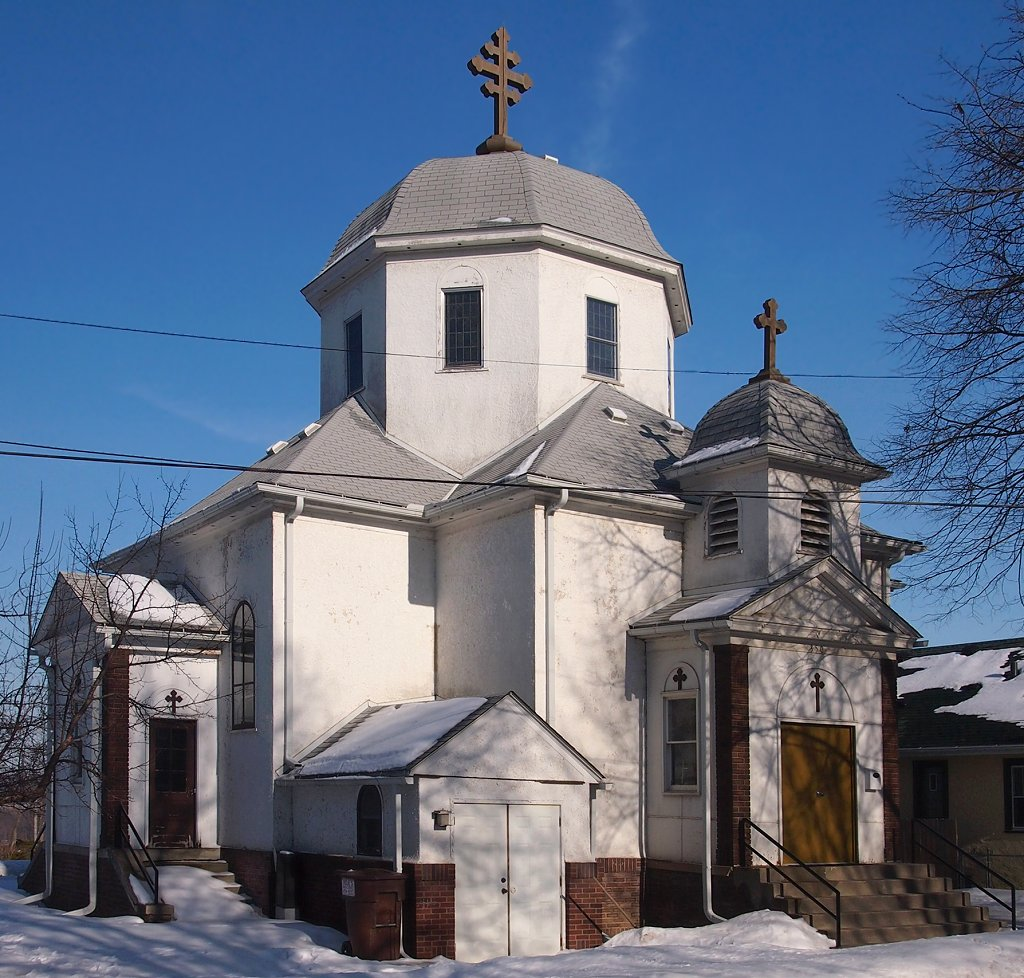
- St. Stefan's Romanian Orthodox Church from the west

- Location within Minnesota Location within the United States
- Location: South St. Paul, Minnesota
- Coordinates: 44°53′44″N 93°2′20″W
- Built: 1924
- Built by: Bartl, John
- Architect: Neagoe, Emil
- Architectural style: Late 19th And 20th Century Revivals
- NRHP reference No.: 04000461
- Added to NRHP: May 19, 2004

St. Stefan's Romanian Orthodox Church is a historic church built in 1924 in South St. Paul, Minnesota, United States. It was built for Romanian American immigrants who worked in the meatpacking industry. It continues to serve as a Romanian Orthodox Church. The patriarchal chair is currently held by Daniel I, Archbishop of Bucharest, Metropolitan of Muntenia and Dobrudja (former Ungro-Wallachia) and Patriarch of All of the Romanian Orthodox Church.
