= Union League of America Hall =

- U.S. National Register of Historic Places
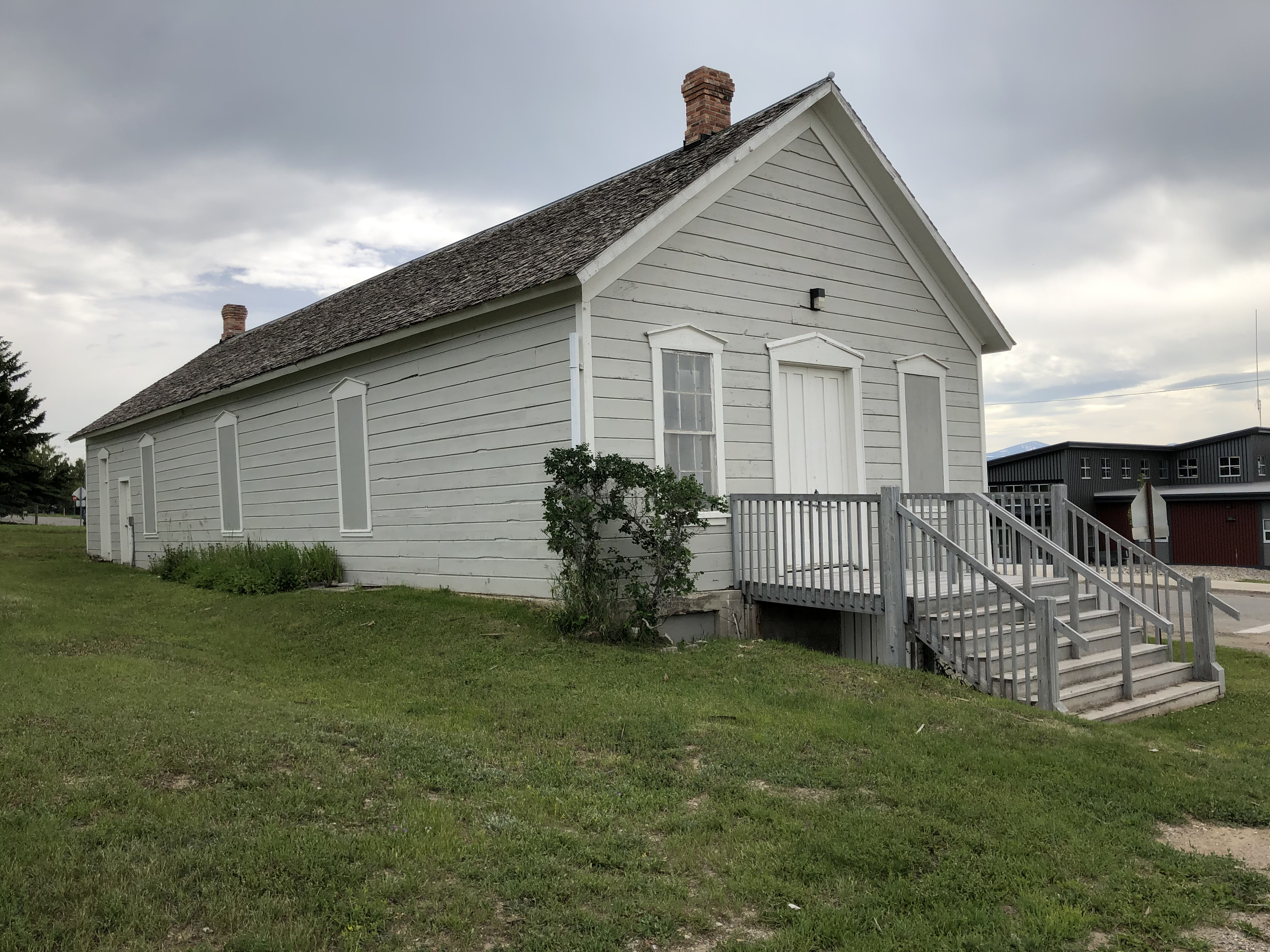

- Location within Montana Location within the United States
- Location: Crawford St. at Central Ave. S., White Sulphur Springs, Montana
- Coordinates: 46°32′42″N 110°54′08″W
- Area: less than one acre
- Built: 1867
- Architectural style: Greek Revival
- NRHP reference No.: 98001084
- Added to NRHP: August 20, 1998

The Union League of America Hall is a site on the National Register of Historic Places located in White Sulphur Springs, Montana. It was added to the Register on August 20, 1998.

In 1998 it was the First Presbyterian Church. It has also been known as Diamond Lodge No. 5 of the Independent Order of Good Templars and as The First Church of White Sulphur Springs.

It was built in 1867 by a Union League and is a 24 by 74 feet (7.3 m × 22.6 m) building, on a concrete basement made in 1935. It is "simple in form and with minimal adornment"; it "is a vernacular version of the Greek Revival Style. The front-gabled form, pedimented door and windows, and six-over-six sash provide links to the style. Additionally, the raised elevation of the front imparts a subtle sense of monumentality to the building."

== See also ==
- Good Templars Hall
- National Register of Historic Places listings in Meagher County, Montana
