= Horticulture Building (Minnesota) =

Former building in Farmington, Minnesota, United States

Coordinates: 44°37′48.2″N 93°8′44.9″W

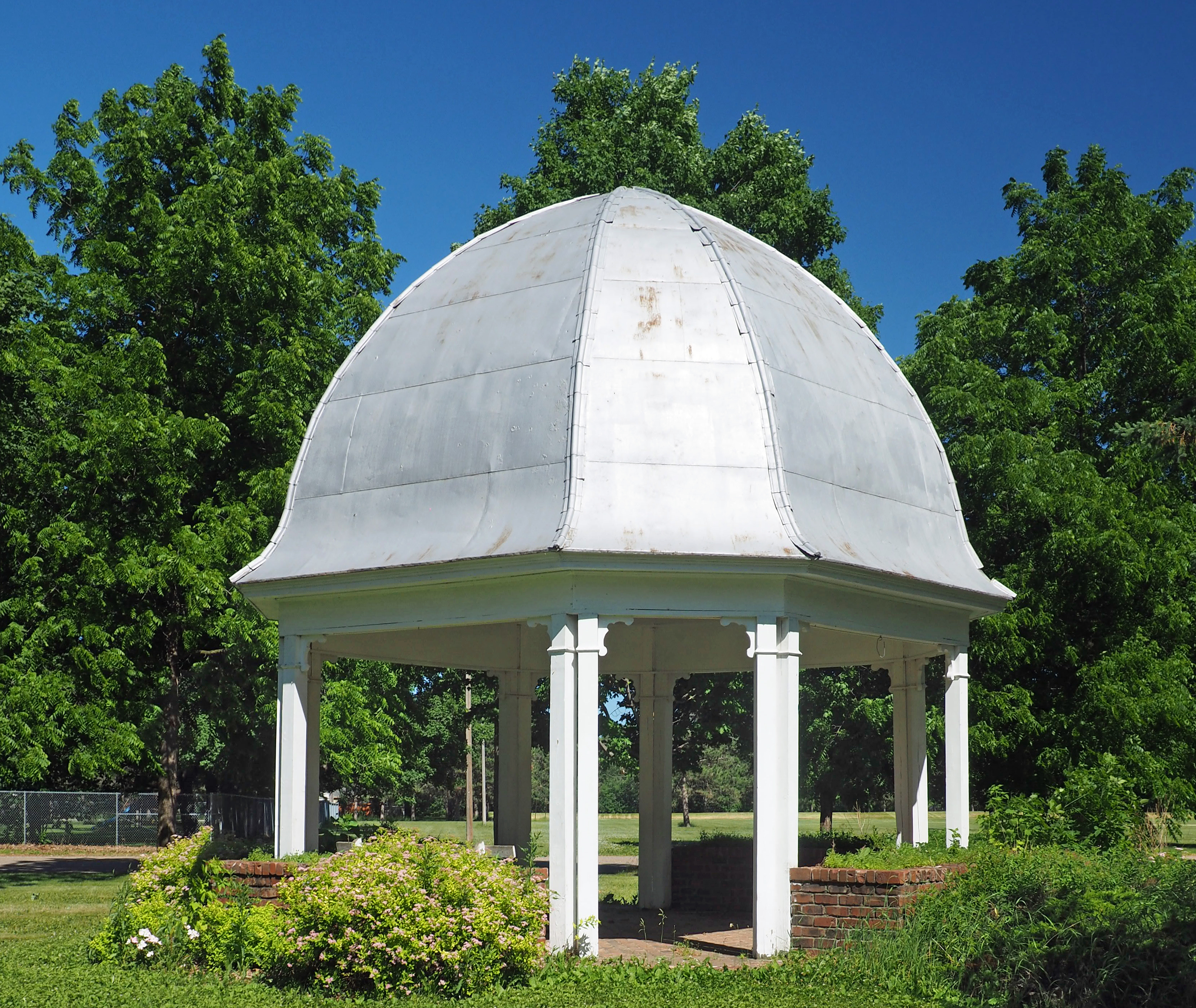
Gazebo on the Dakota County Fairgrounds built from the dome of the Horticulture Building after its demolition in 1988

The Horticulture Building was a building at the Dakota County Fairgrounds in Farmington, Minnesota, United States. It was built in 1918 and demolished in 1988.

== Dakota County Fair ==
The Dakota County Fair began in 1858 when the Dakota County Agricultural Society was organized. Henry H. Sibley, the first governor of the state of Minnesota, was guest speaker at the first fair which was held in Nininger. The fair moved to Hastings, the county seat, and then to its permanent grounds near Farmington in 1918.

== The Horticulture Building ==
When the permanent fairgrounds were established in 1918, one of the first structures built was the Horticulture Building. The building had a central section flanked by two 40-foot wings. The central section was topped by a wooden octagonal dome which was painted silver. The building was constructed of wood and red clay tiles, and was considered an example of early twentieth-century fairgrounds architecture. In 1980, the Horticulture Building was added to the National Register of Historic Places.

By 1984, the dome had begun to lean to one side and it was feared that it could blow over in a storm. County fair officials decided that the cost of restoration would be too high and the building was razed in 1988. A replacement building was constructed and the old dome was turned into a gazebo on the fairgrounds.

In 1993, the Exhibition Hall was removed from the National Register of Historic Places.

== See also ==
- National Register of Historic Places listings in Dakota County, Minnesota
