= VanDyke–Libby House =

Historic house in Minnesota, United States

- VanDyke-Libby House
- U.S. National Register of Historic Places
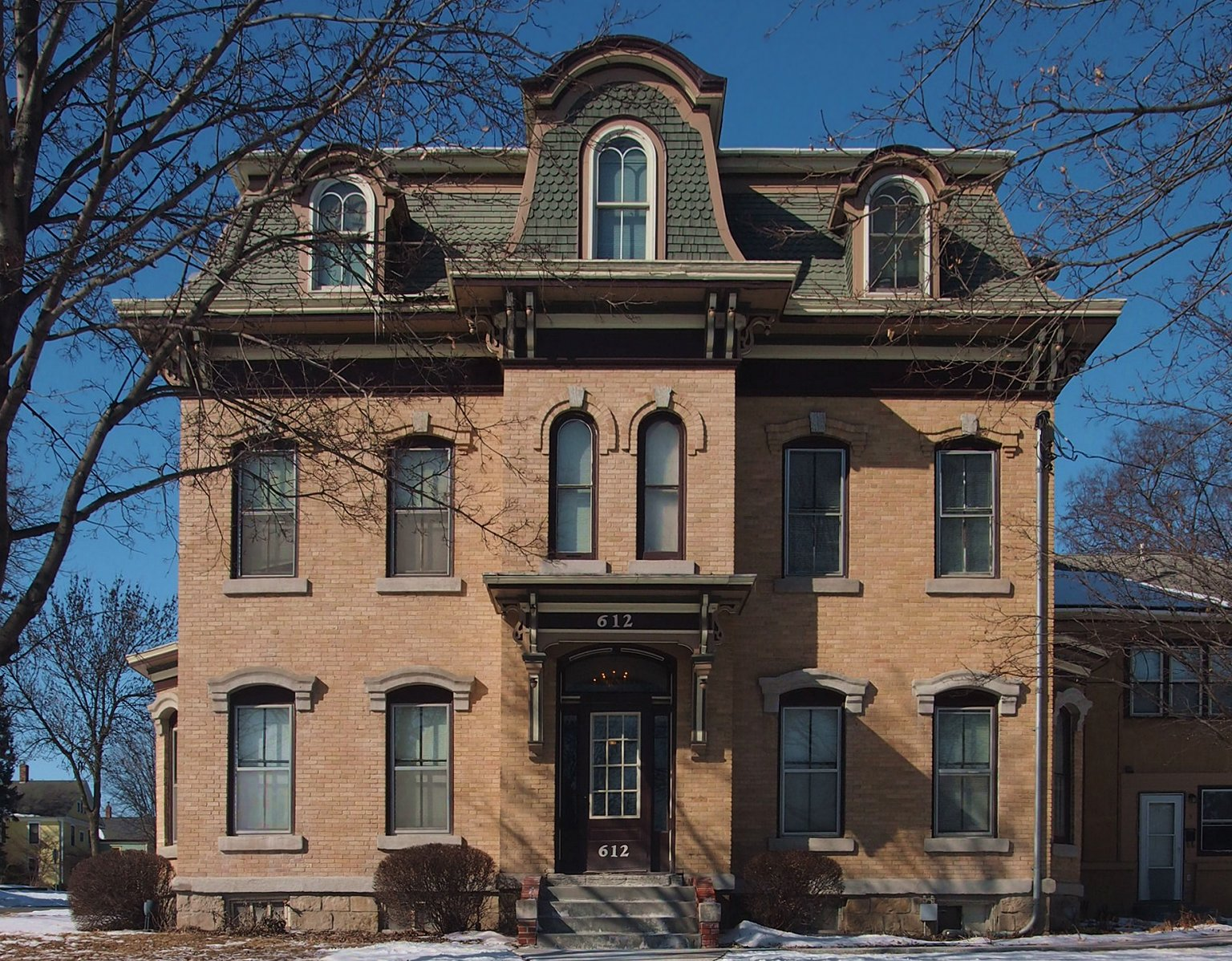
- The VanDyke-Libby House from the east

- Location within Minnesota Location within the United States
- Location: Hastings, Minnesota
- Coordinates: 44°44′22.2″N 92°51′11.3″W
- Built: 1868
- Architect: William J. Van Dyke
- Architectural style: Second Empire
- NRHP reference No.: 78001533
- Added to NRHP: October 2, 1978

The VanDyke–Libby House, located at 612 Vermillion Street in Hastings, Minnesota is listed on the National Register of Historic Places. It was built in 1868 by William J. Van Dyke, a banker and merchant. In 1880 the home was bought by Rowland C. Libby who was part-owner of a saw mill and door and sash factory. He lived there until 1911; in 1914 the building was converted to a sanitarium. Originally known as Hope Sanitarium, its name was later changed to St. Raphael's Hospital, which in 1929 moved to the Thompson-Fasbender House.

The building's Second Empire architecture is reflected in its mansard roof and imposing size. The original cost to build the house was an exorbitant $25,000.

== See also ==
- National Register of Historic Places listings in Dakota County, Minnesota
