= Union League =

Pro-Union club during the American Civil War

Union League of America
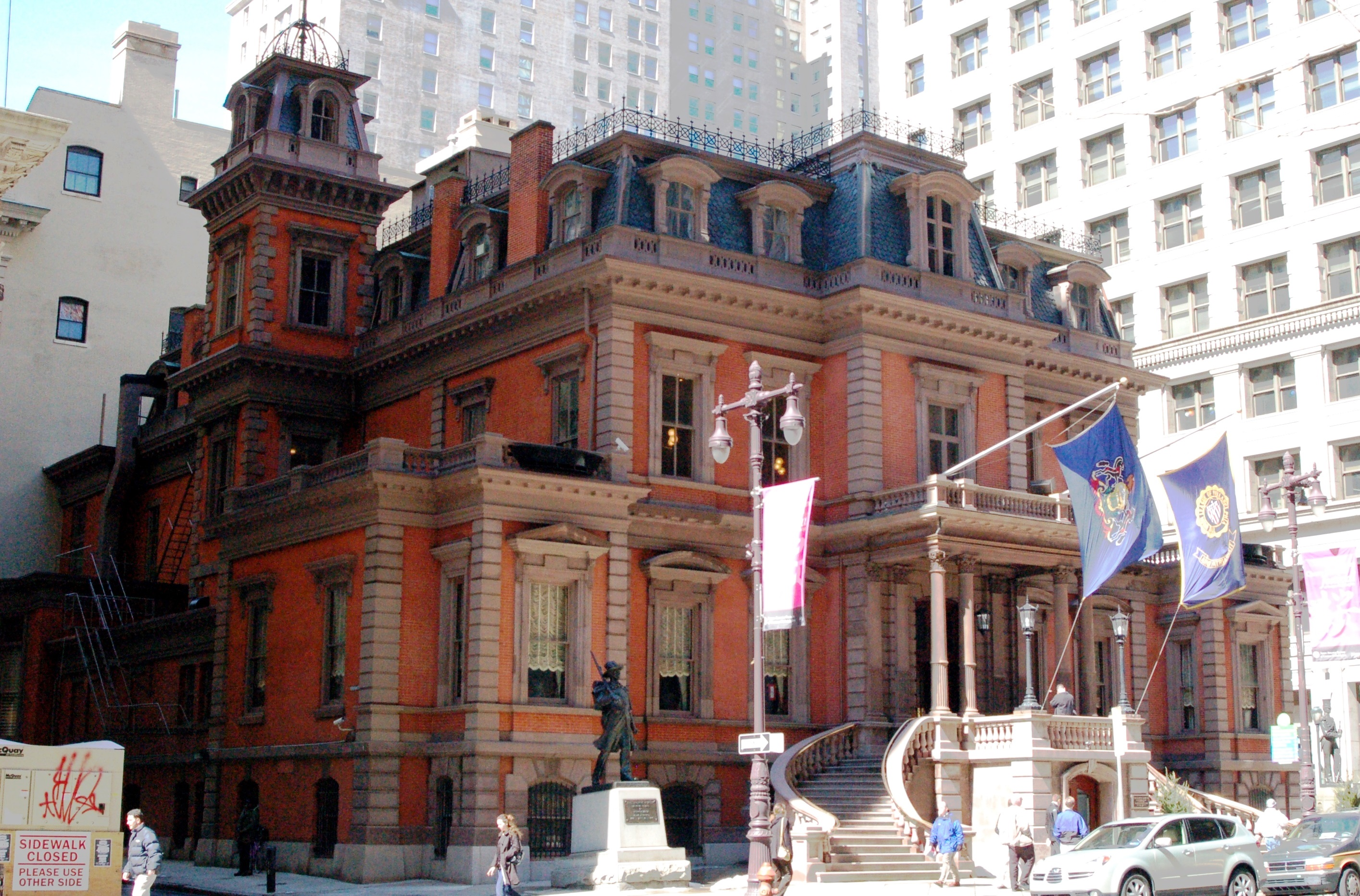
- Union League in Philadelphia
- Formation: 1862; 164 years ago
- Founder: American Unionists during the Civil War
- Founded at: Pekin, Illinois
- Purpose: To promote loyalty to the Union and support the Republican Party
- Location(s): New York Chicago Philadelphia

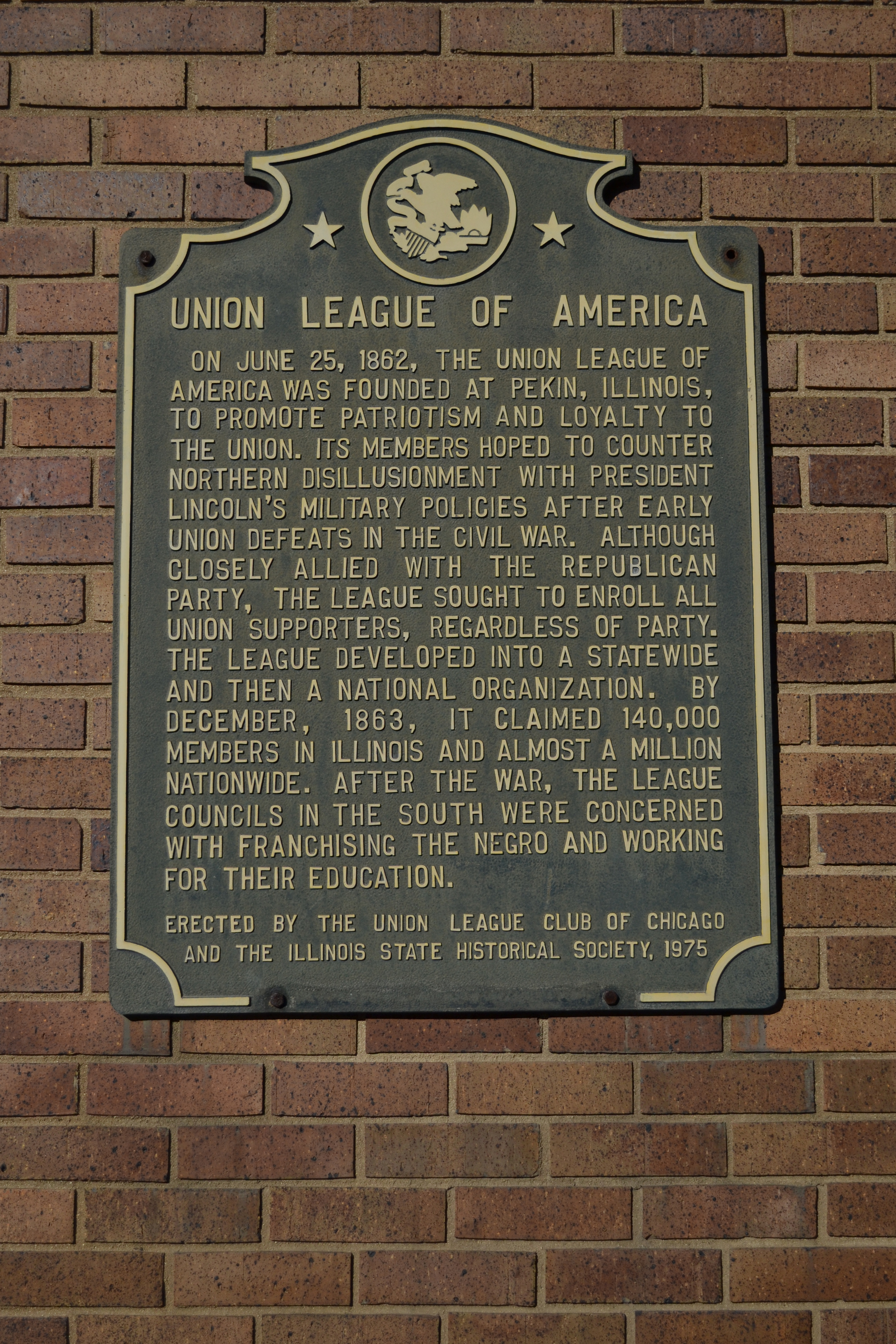
Historical plaque in Pekin, Illinois

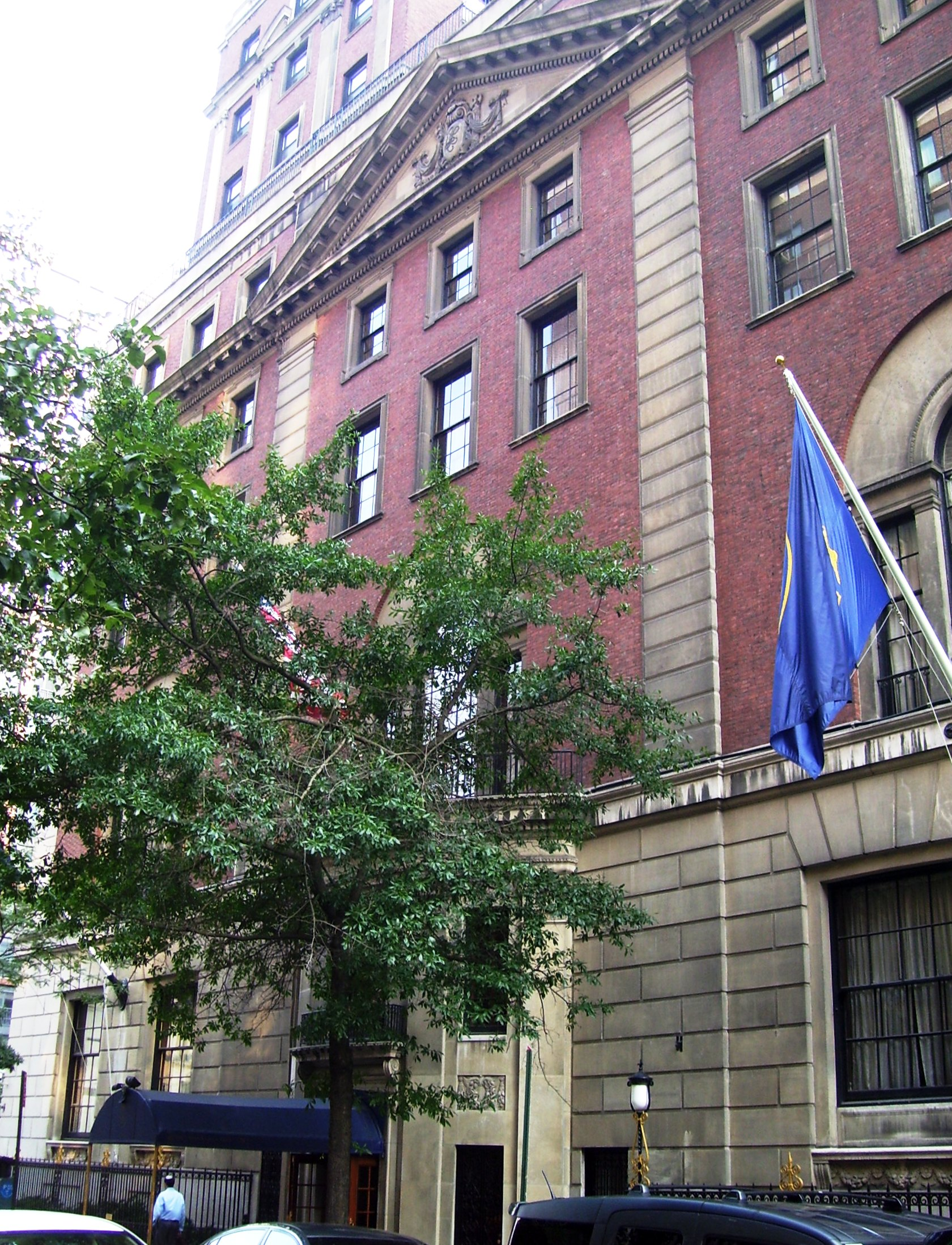
Union League Club of New York, established 1863.

The Union Leagues are quasi-secretive men's clubs established separately, starting in 1862, and continuing throughout the Civil War (1861–1865). The oldest Union League of America council member, an organization originally called "The League of Union Men", was formed in June 1862 in Pekin, Illinois. Four months later, on November 22, 1862, the Union League of Philadelphia, the first of the elite eastern Leagues and the second-oldest ULA council member, was established (and is still active today, as are the Union League Clubs of New York and Chicago). The Philadelphia building was added to the National Register of Historic Places in 1979.

The Union Leagues were established to promote loyalty to the Union of the United States of America, to support the policies of newly elected 16th President Abraham Lincoln (1861–1865) and to assure his reelection in 1864, and to combat what they believed to be the treasonous words and actions of anti-war, anti-black "Copperhead" Democrats. Though initially nonpartisan, by the election year of 1864 they were in open alliance with the Republican Party, supporting the reelection of Abraham Lincoln, but were also supportive of pro-Union Democrats.

The largest and best known of these clubs formed in Philadelphia, New York, and Boston, were composed of prosperous men who raised money for war-related service organizations such as the United States Sanitary Commission, which provided medical care to treat Federal soldiers wounded in battle at a time when the military was ill-prepared for the scale of need.

At the same time as these elite clubs were formed, Union Leagues sprang-up throughout the rest of the North, created primarily by working-class men, while women's organizations known as Ladies Union Leagues appeared in towns across the North. In the spring of 1863 these separate, though (mostly) philosophically aligned groups, were organized under the Union League of America (ULA), headquartered in Washington, D.C.

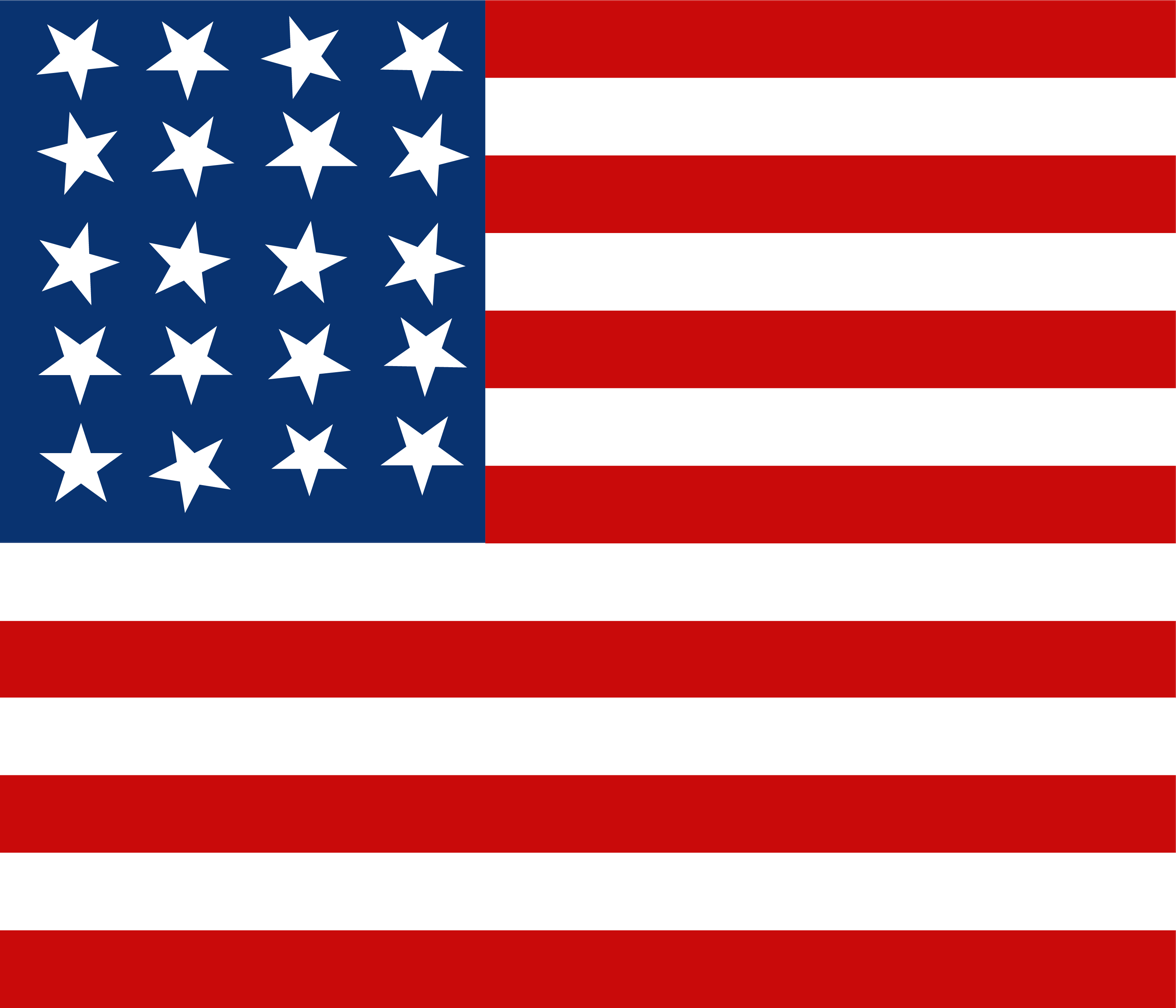
Digital remake of the 20-star United States flag used by Union League in Prairie du Chien from 1862 to 1865

== Postwar ==
During the Reconstruction era, Union Leagues were formed across the South after 1867 as working auxiliaries of the Republican Party, supported entirely by Northern interests. They were secret organizations that mobilized freedmen to register to vote and to vote Republican. They taught freedmen Union views on political issues and which way to vote on them, and promoted civic projects. Eric Foner reports:

By the end of 1867 it seemed that virtually every black voter in the South had enrolled in the Union League, the Loyal League, or some equivalent local political organization. Meetings were generally held in a black church or school.

The Ku Klux Klan; a secret society of white supremacists which opposed civil rights and terrorized black voters, sometimes assassinated leaders of the Union Leagues.

The Union Leagues still do support the Republican Party despite the changes in party ideology over the years. In 2023, there was a controversy in the New York City Union League about whether to put a picture of Donald Trump on the wall of their Union Hall; the NYC Union League had a picture of every previous Republican president. The pro-Trump and anti-Trump Republicans in the NYC Union League ultimately compromised by putting up a picture of Trump that was hidden behind a couch. Many Union Leagues preferred other candidates such as Ron DeSantis to Trump in the 2024 Republican primaries. The Philadelphia Union League bestowed their highest honor on DeSantis, which caused a small protest by NAACP members and other civil rights supporters outside of the Union League building.

== Philanthropic endeavors ==
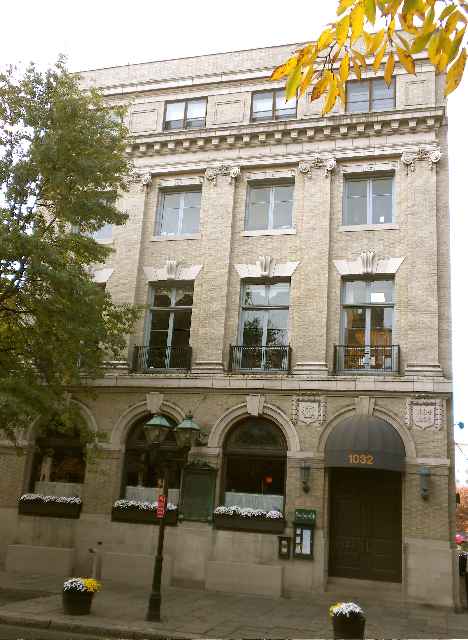
Beaux-Arts building formerly the Union League club of New Haven, Connecticut

After the Civil War, members of the Union League Club of New York broadened their support of other philanthropic purposes. For instance, they helped to found the Metropolitan Museum of Art, and funded construction of the Statue of Liberty's pedestal and Grant's Tomb.

Some former Union League buildings have been adapted for other uses. In Brooklyn, New York, the former Union League Club building now serves as a senior citizens' home. The former Union League building in New Haven, Connecticut, built on the site of Roger Sherman's home is now a restaurant. In 1949, members of the Union League Club of Chicago raised contributions to found the Union League Civic and Arts Foundation as a public, not-for-profit charitable, educational organization, whose mission is community enrichment.

== See also ==
- Union League of Philadelphia
- Union League Club of Chicago
- Union League Club of New York
- Union League of America Hall
- Union League Golf and Country Club
- List of American gentlemen's clubs
