= George W. Wentworth House =

Historic house in Minnesota, United States

- U.S. National Register of Historic Places
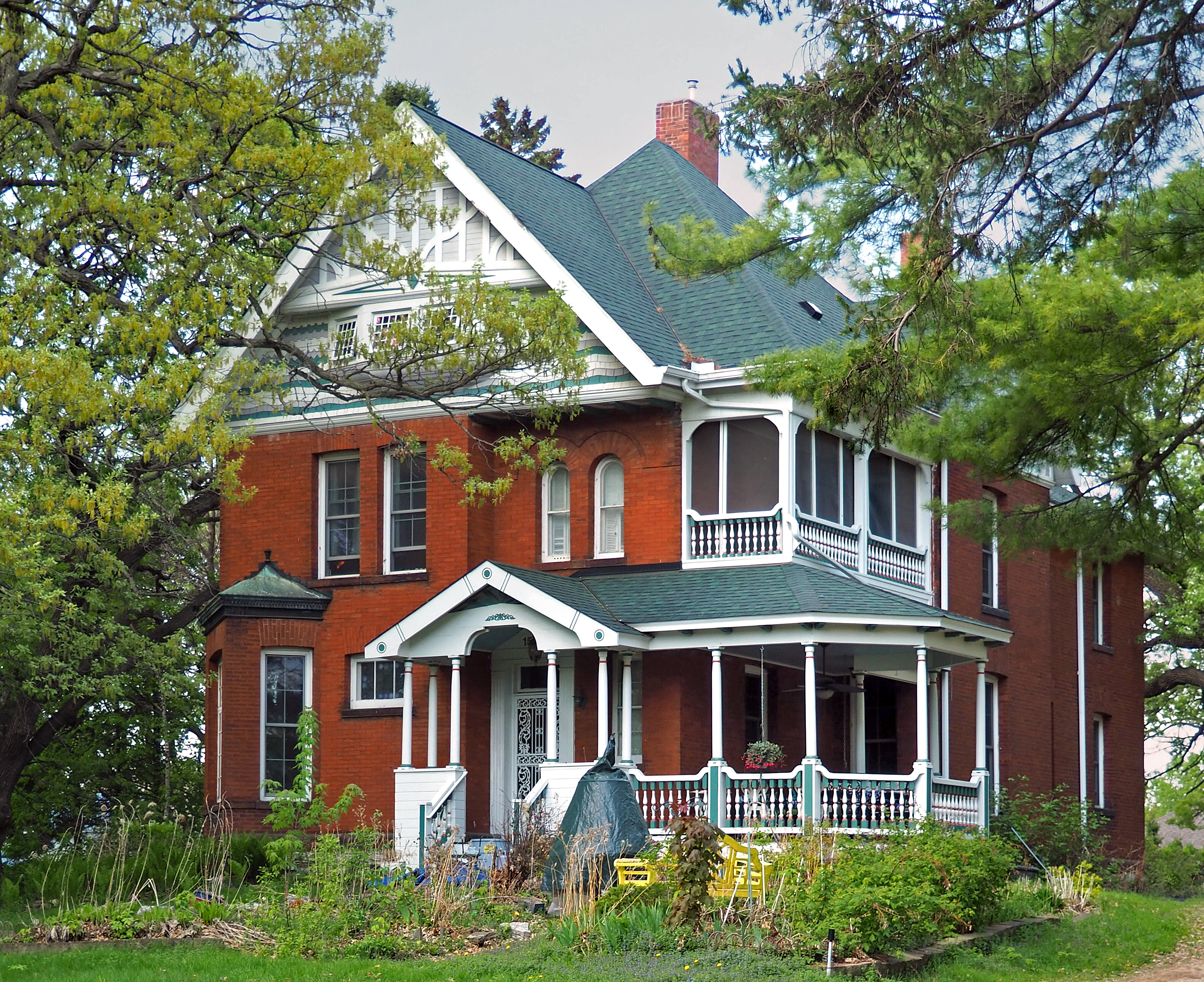
- The George W. Wentworth House viewed from the northeast

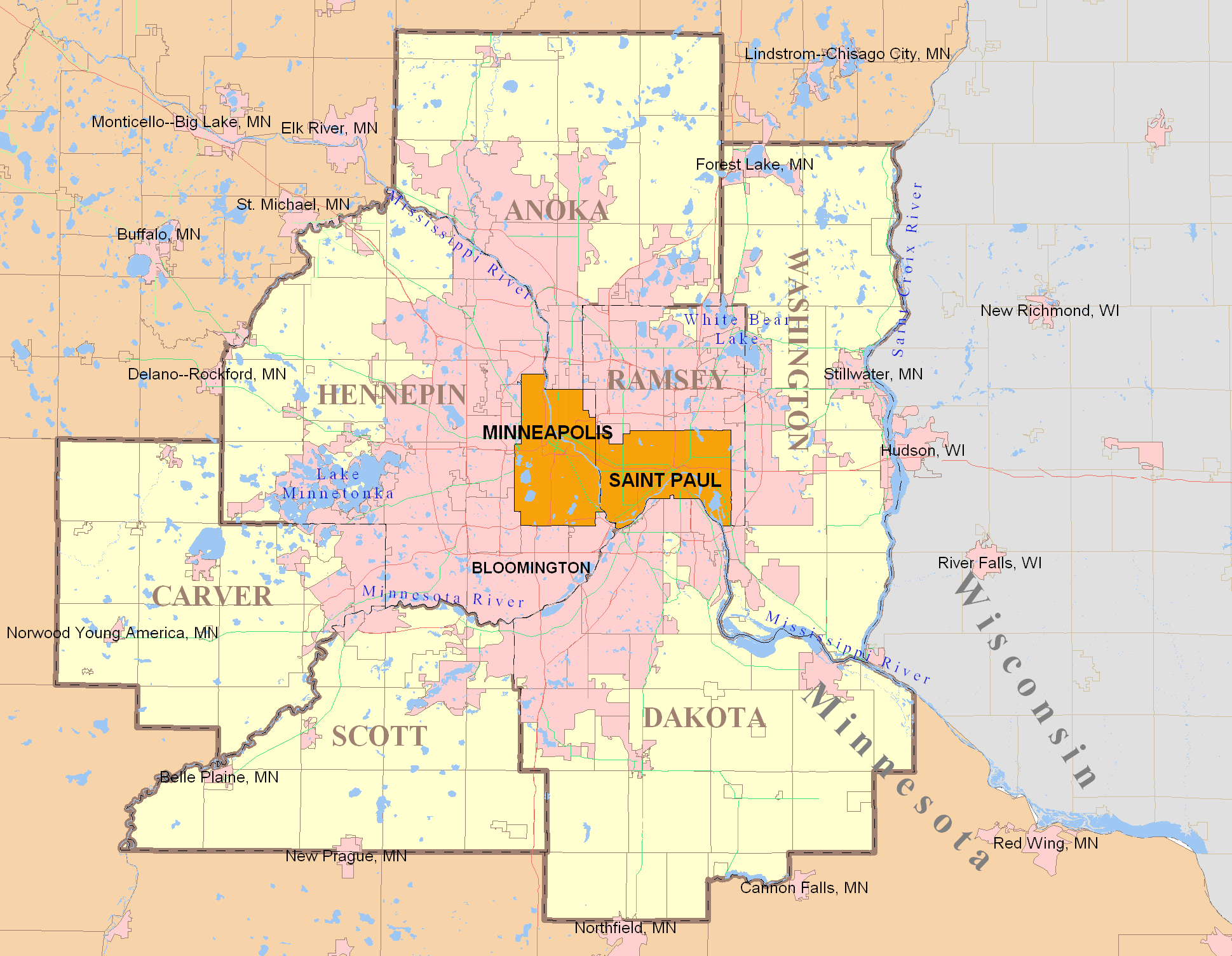
- Location within Minneapolis–Saint Paul Location within Minnesota Location within the United States
- Location: 1575 Oakdale Avenue, West St. Paul, Minnesota
- Coordinates: 44°53′55.5″N 93°4′20″W
- Built: 1887
- Architectural style: Queen Anne
- NRHP reference No.: 79001237
- Added to NRHP: December 31, 1979

The George W. Wentworth House is a large Queen Anne style home, that was built in 1887 in West Saint Paul in the U.S. state of Minnesota. Wentworth was an emigre from England who traded in horses; he was also involved in local politics, working to organize the city of South Saint Paul. In the late 1880s, a dispute arose between the farmers in the western portion of the city, whom Wentworth represented, and the people living around the stockyards in the eastern portion of the city. West Saint Paul disjoined from South Saint Paul in 1889 and Wentworth remained politically active in the new city. After his death in 1908, the house remained vacant for many years before being renovated by subsequent owners.
