= Hastings Foundry-Star Iron Works =

- U.S. National Register of Historic Places
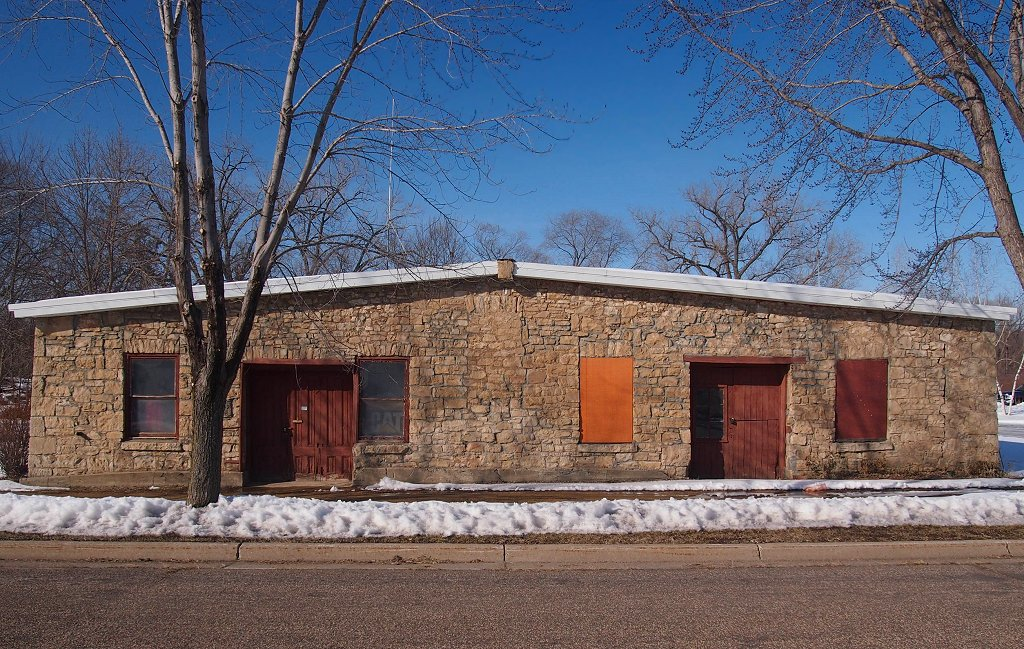
- The Hastings Foundry-Star Iron Works from the south

- Location within Minnesota Location within the United States
- Location: Hastings, Minnesota
- Coordinates: 44°44′44″N 92°50′39″W
- Built: 1859
- Architect: A.R. Morrell
- NRHP reference No.: 79001229
- Added to NRHP: December 31, 1979

The Hastings Foundry-Star Iron Works is a historic foundry building in Hastings, Minnesota, United States. Located at 707 First Street East, it was built by A. R. Morrell, an ironsmith from Vermont, in 1859. The building is historically significant as the location where the first steam engine in Minnesota was built (1860). In 1861 the engine for the Stella Whipple was manufactured there as well. Iron for bridges and engines for railroad elevators, automobiles, and river boats were manufactured in this earliest surviving industrial site in the state.
