= Byron Howes House =

Historic house in Minnesota, United States

- U.S. National Register of Historic Places
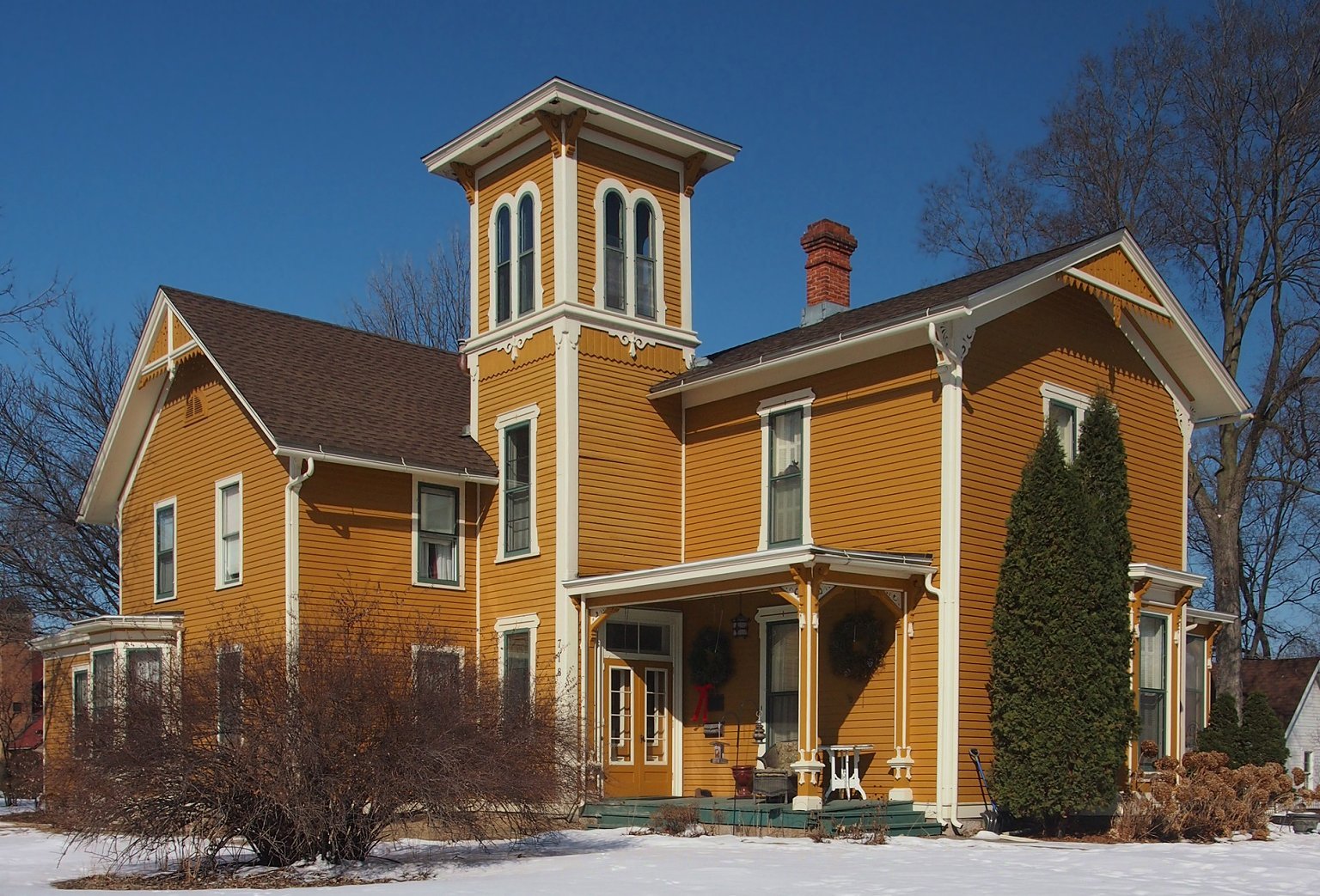
- The Byron Howes House from the southeast

- Location within Minnesota Location within the United States
- Location: 718 Vermillion St., Hastings, Minnesota
- Coordinates: 44°44′18.7″N 92°51′12″W
- Area: less than one acre
- Built: c. 1869
- Architectural style: Italian Villa
- NRHP reference No.: 78001529
- Added to NRHP: June 15, 1978

The Byron Howes House (also known as the Howes-Graus House) is a historic house located at 718 Vermillion Street in Hastings, Minnesota.

== Description and history ==
The house was built in 1868 in the Italianate style by Byron Howes, an early resident of Hastings. The Italianate style was being popularized by Andrew Jackson Downing around the time. Byron Howes helped to establish two banks, one in Hastings and one in St. Paul. He also served as a deputy county treasurer and held other public offices in Hastings.

The house was later purchased by Wendel Graus, a businessman involved in hardware and lumber businesses. The house was listed on the National Register of Historic Places in 1978.
