= District No. 72 School =

- U.S. National Register of Historic Places
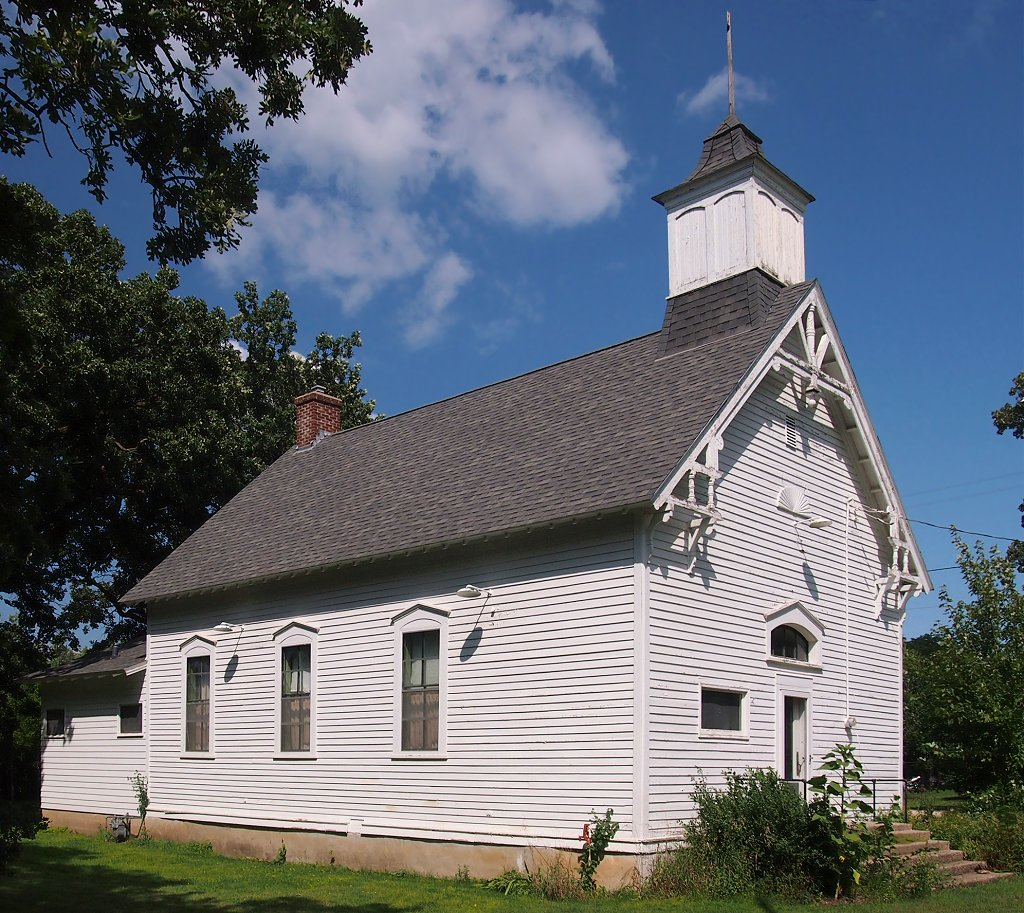
- District No. 72 School from the southwest

- Location within Minnesota Location within the United States
- Location: 3847 321st Street W. Waterford Township, Minnesota
- Nearest city: Northfield, Minnesota
- Coordinates: 44°29′05″N 93°08′41″W
- Built: 1882
- NRHP reference No.: 79001236
- Added to NRHP: December 31, 1979

The District No. 72 School represents small, rural school-houses in Dakota County in the U.S. state of Minnesota. It was built in 1882, with a bell-tower, clapboard siding, a steep gabled roof, and pediments. It was later repurposed as Waterford Township's community center and township hall, serving in that role from 1935 until 2022. In 2022 it was moved six miles (10 km) south to the Rice County Steam and Gas Showgrounds outside Dundas, Minnesota.
