= Minneapolis Saint Paul Rochester & Dubuque Electric Traction Company Depot =

- Minneapolis St. Paul Rochester & Dubuque Electric Traction Company Depot
- U.S. National Register of Historic Places
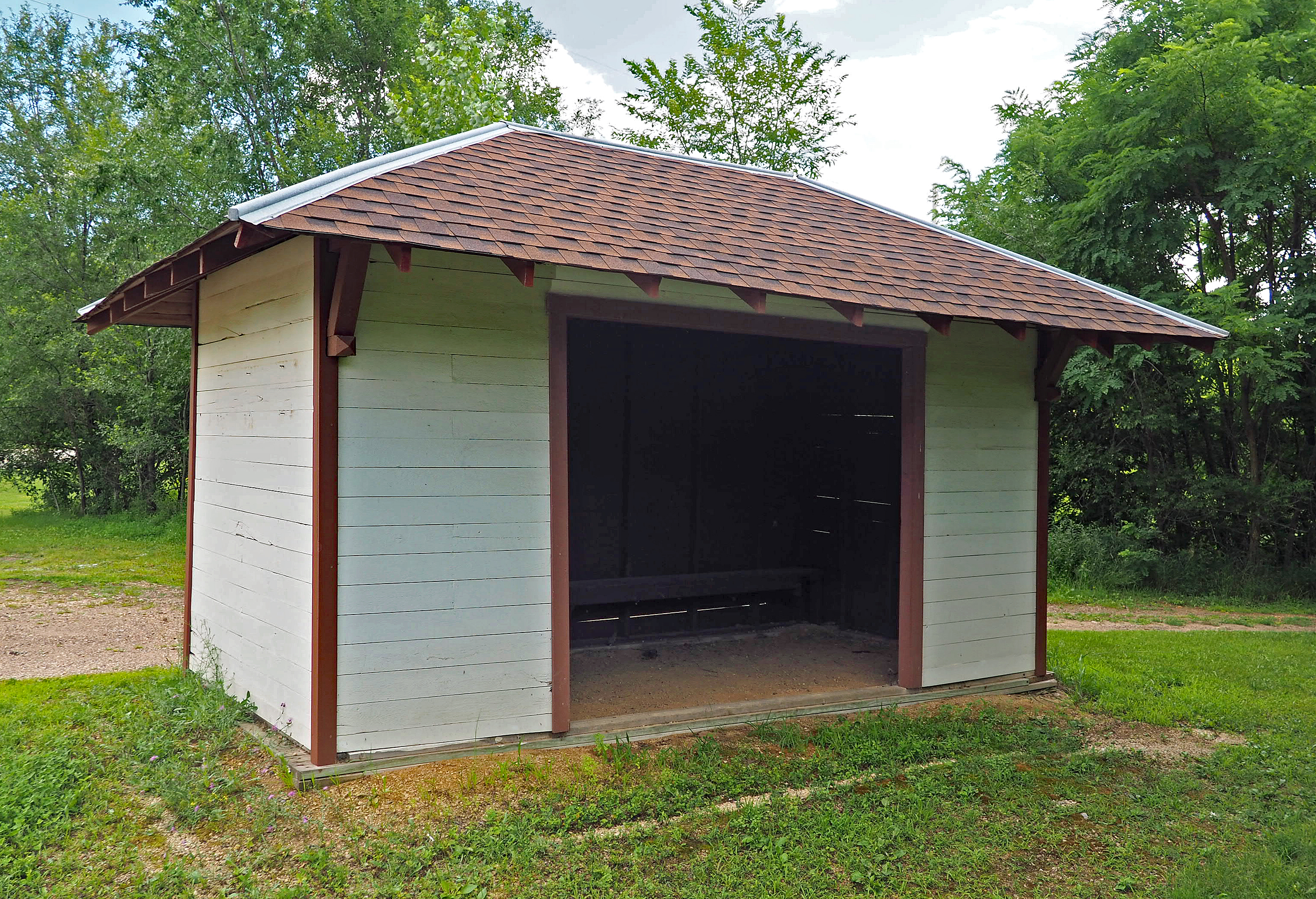
- The Orchard Gardens Depot from the northwest

- Location within Minnesota Location within the United States
- Location: Burnsville, Minnesota
- Coordinates: 44°43′21.9″N 93°17′54.4″W
- Built: 1910
- NRHP reference No.: 79001222
- Added to NRHP: December 31, 1979

The Minneapolis Saint Paul Rochester & Dubuque Electric Traction Company Depot or Orchard Gardens Railway Station, located at County Road 5 and 155th Street in Burnsville in the U.S. state of Minnesota was built in 1910 on the Dan Patch Line, later known as the Minneapolis, Northfield and Southern Railway. Connecting Northfield and Minneapolis, the line carried agricultural produce from rural Dakota County to urban markets. When Orchard Gardens in Burnsville was platted in 1910, this small depot was added for the area's passengers. Orchard Gardens farmers grew onions, apples, and flowers, and produced eggs and milk until the Great Depression caused locals to find employment in Minneapolis. Then the station attracted more commuters than farmers.

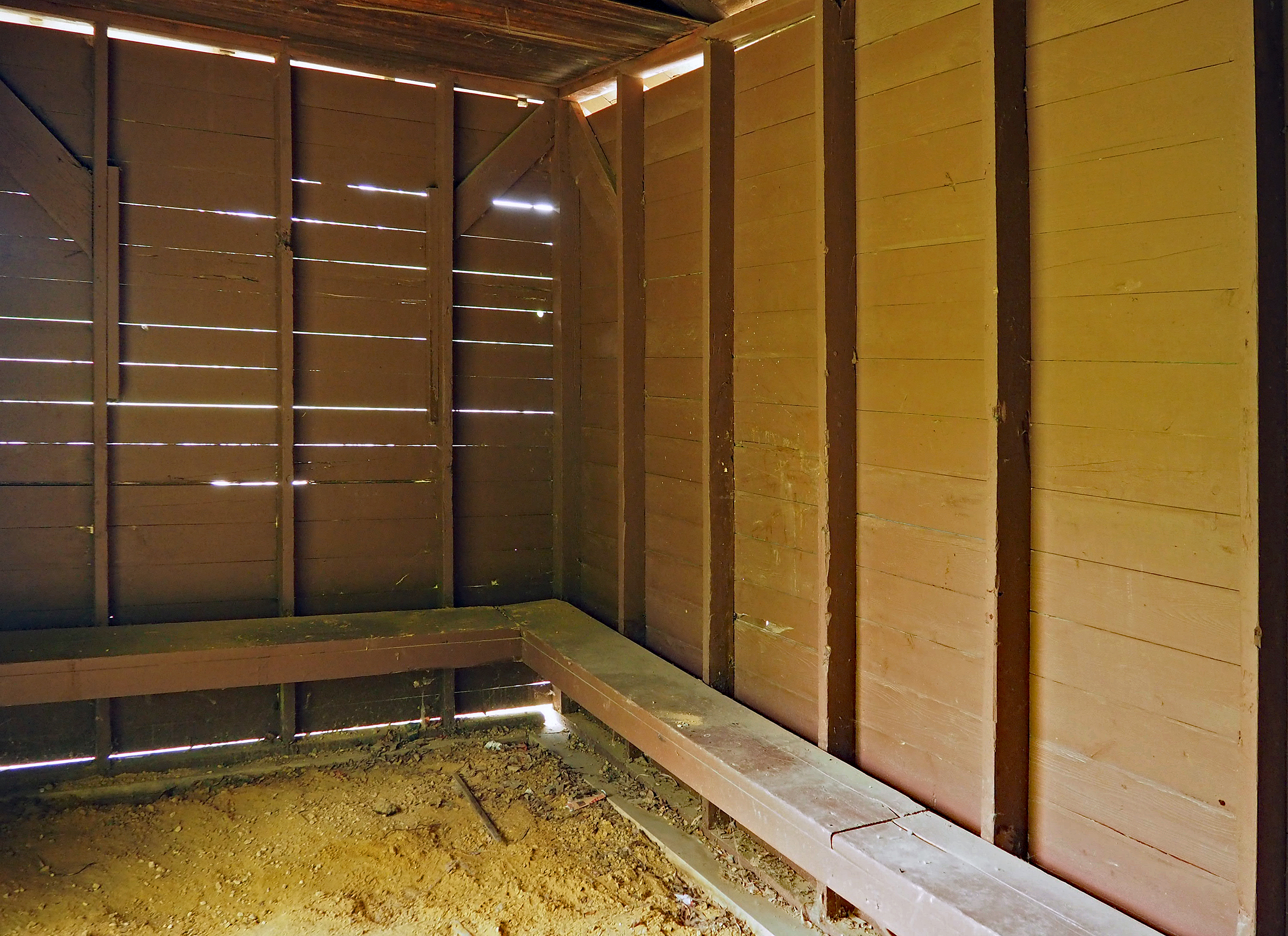
The depot's interior
