= Good Templars Hall =

- Formerly listed on the U.S. National Register of Historic Places
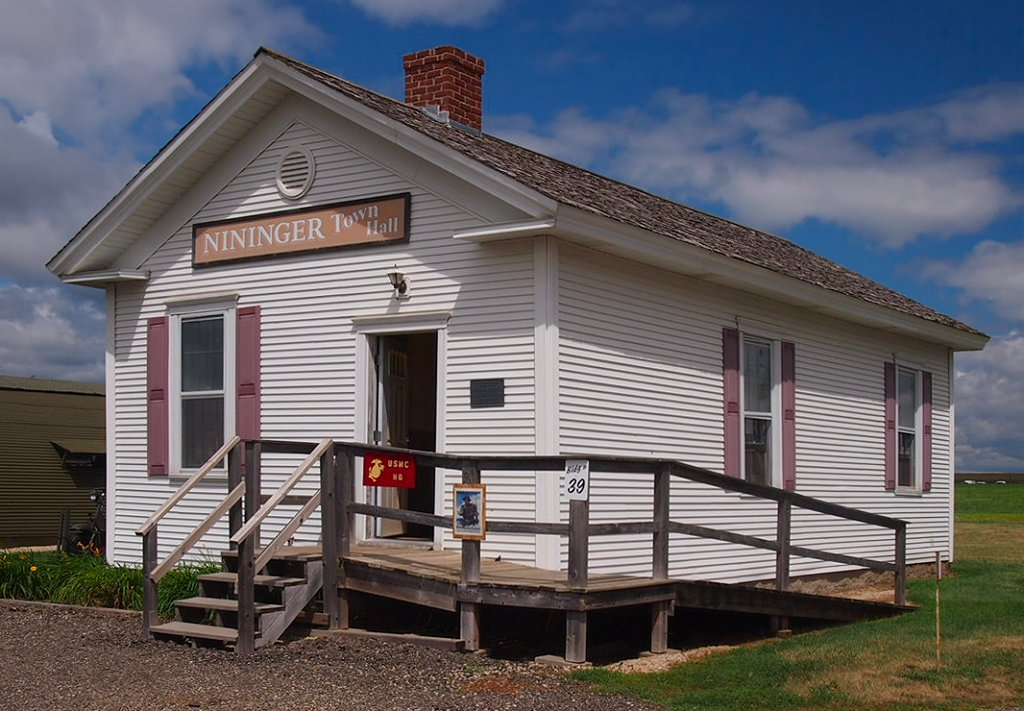
- Good Templars Hall as it now stands in the Little Log House Pioneer Village

- Location within Minnesota Location within the United States
- Nearest city: 9965 124th Street, Hastings, Minnesota
- Coordinates: 44°46′11″N 92°54′15″W
- Built: 1858
- Architectural style: Greek Revival
- NRHP reference No.: 79001234

Significant dates
- Added to NRHP: December 31, 1979
- Removed from NRHP: January 29, 2025

The Good Templars Hall is a Greek Revival style public building that was built in 1858 in Nininger in the U.S. state of Minnesota. The Nininger Chapter of the Independent Order of Good Templars, a temperance group, built the two-story hall to have a place for socializing without alcohol. When the railroad bypassed Nininger in 1859, the town began to fail, and the building was sold to the school district. In the late 1870s the first floor was removed due to decay, and the upper floor and roof were lowered to the ground level. The building was renovated by an historical group and used as a community center until it was moved to the Little Log House Pioneer Village in 2005. A plaque has been erected near its original location.

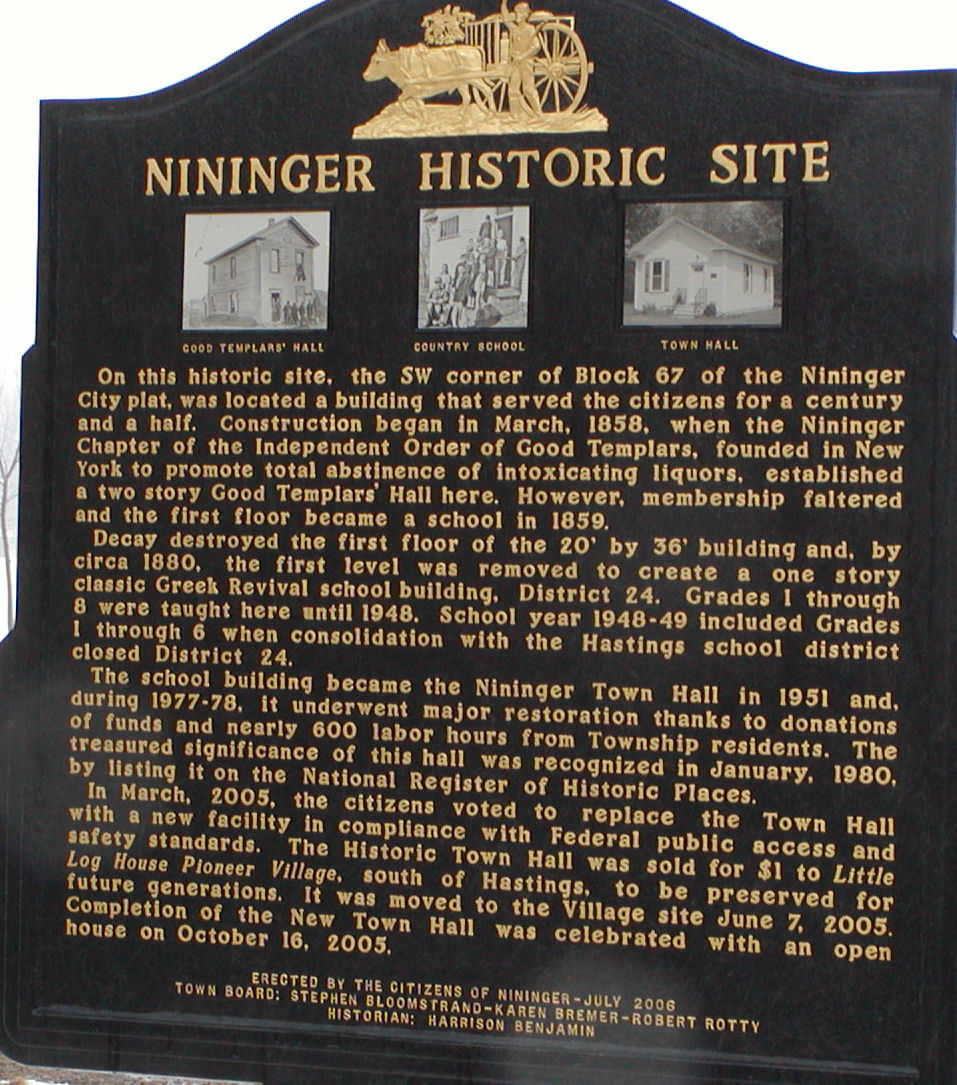
Plaque marking the original location of Good Templar Hall

== See also ==
- Bremen Town House
- Diamond Lodge No. 5
