= Nininger Township, Dakota County, Minnesota =

Township in Minnesota, United States

Nininger Township
- Township
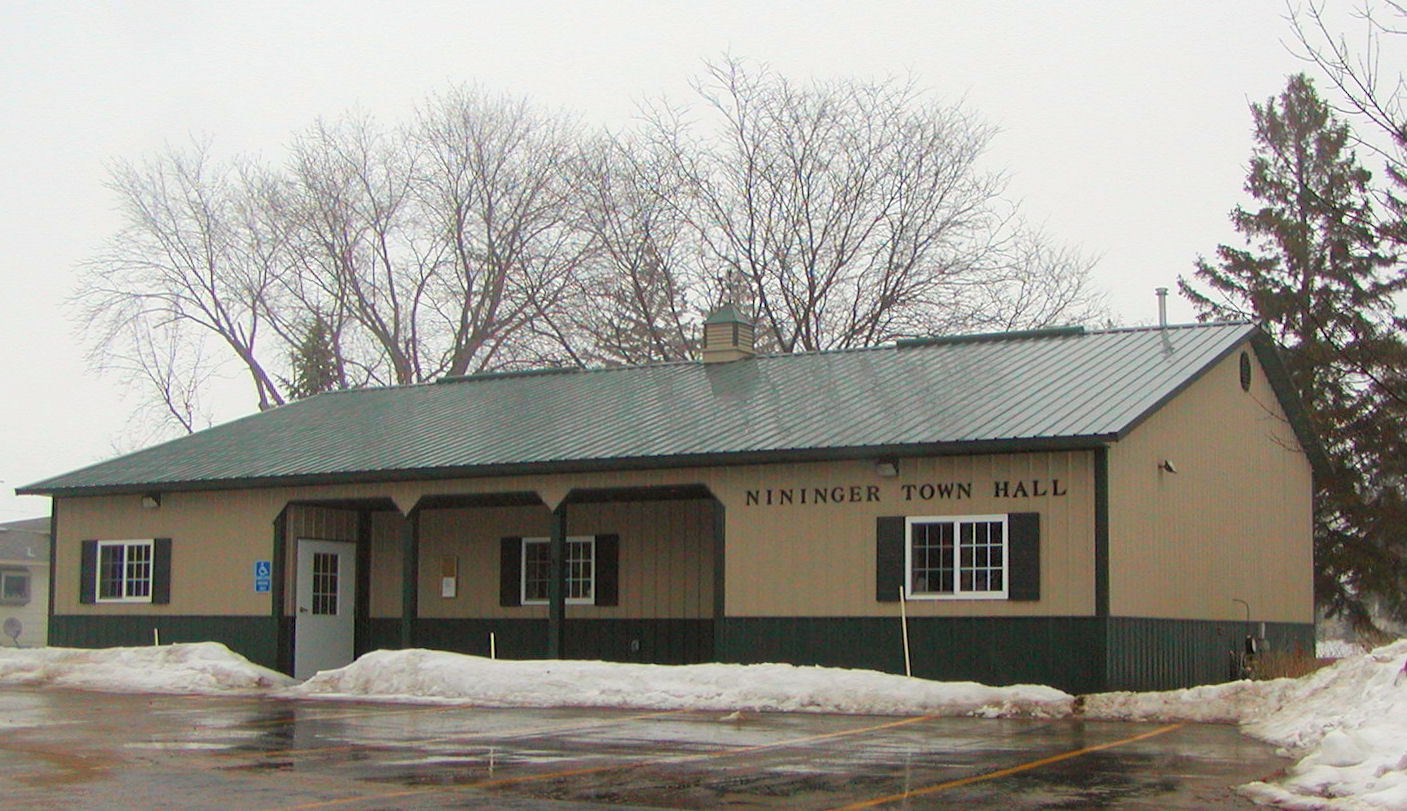
- Town hall

- Location within the state of Minnesota Nininger Township (the United States)
- Coordinates: 44°44′39″N 92°55′23″W
- Country: United States
- State: Minnesota
- County: Dakota

Area
  - Total: 17.2 sq mi (44.6 km^{2})
  - Land: 13.4 sq mi (34.6 km^{2})
  - Water: 3.9 sq mi (10.0 km^{2})
- Elevation: 850 ft (260 m)

Population (2020)
  - Total: 865
  - Density: 65/sq mi (25/km^{2})
- Time zone: UTC-6 (Central (CST))
  - Summer (DST): UTC-5 (CDT)
- FIPS code: 27-46330
- GNIS feature ID: 0665126
- Website: https://niningertownship.com/

Nininger Township is a township in Dakota County, Minnesota, United States. The population was 865 at the 2020 census.

== History ==
Nininger Township was organized in 1858, and named after the village of Nininger. In 1857, Nininger was the site of the first recorded organized baseball club in Minnesota. They proposed extending a challenge to the "whole west" in a game of baseball. All that currently remains of the city of Nininger are a few buildings dedicated to township management and two historical markers.

== Geography ==
According to the United States Census Bureau, the township has a total area of 17.2 square miles (44.6 km^{2}), of which 13.3 square miles (34.6 km^{2}) is land and 3.9 square miles (10.0 km^{2}) (22.49%) is water.

== Demographics ==
Historical population
Census	Pop.	Note	%±
1860	469		—
1870	400		−14.7%
1880	239		−40.2%
1890	276		15.5%
1900	309		12.0%
1910	242		−21.7%
1920	256		5.8%
1930	275		7.4%
1940	255		−7.3%
1950	252		−1.2%
1960	332		31.7%
1970	554		66.9%
1980	774		39.7%
1990	805		4.0%
2000	865		7.5%
2010	950		9.8%
2020	865		−8.9%
U.S. Decennial Census

As of the census of 2000, there were 865 people, 280 households, and 241 families residing in the township. The population density was 64.8 inhabitants per square mile (25.0/km^{2}). There were 285 housing units at an average density of 21.4/sq mi (8.2/km^{2}). The racial makeup of the township was 98.27% White, 0.12% African American, 0.12% Native American, 0.35% Asian, 0.23% from other races, and 0.92% from two or more races. Hispanic or Latino of any race were 0.81% of the population.

There were 280 households, out of which 40.0% had children under the age of 18 living with them, 80.7% were married couples living together, 3.6% had a female householder with no husband present, and 13.6% were non-families. 8.9% of all households were made up of individuals, and 3.6% had someone living alone who was 65 years of age or older. The average household size was 3.09 and the average family size was 3.31.

In the township the population was spread out, with 27.9% under the age of 18, 9.7% from 18 to 24, 28.8% from 25 to 44, 25.4% from 45 to 64, and 8.2% who were 65 years of age or older. The median age was 37 years. For every 100 females, there were 103.1 males. For every 100 females age 18 and over, there were 101.9 males.

The median income for a household in the township was $72,955, and the median income for a family was $75,477. Males had a median income of $46,146 versus $32,500 for females. The per capita income for the township was $27,337. About 1.2% of families and 2.8% of the population were below the poverty line, including 3.7% of those under age 18 and none of those age 65 or over.
