= Hastings Methodist Episcopal Church =

Historic church in Minnesota, United States

- U.S. National Register of Historic Places
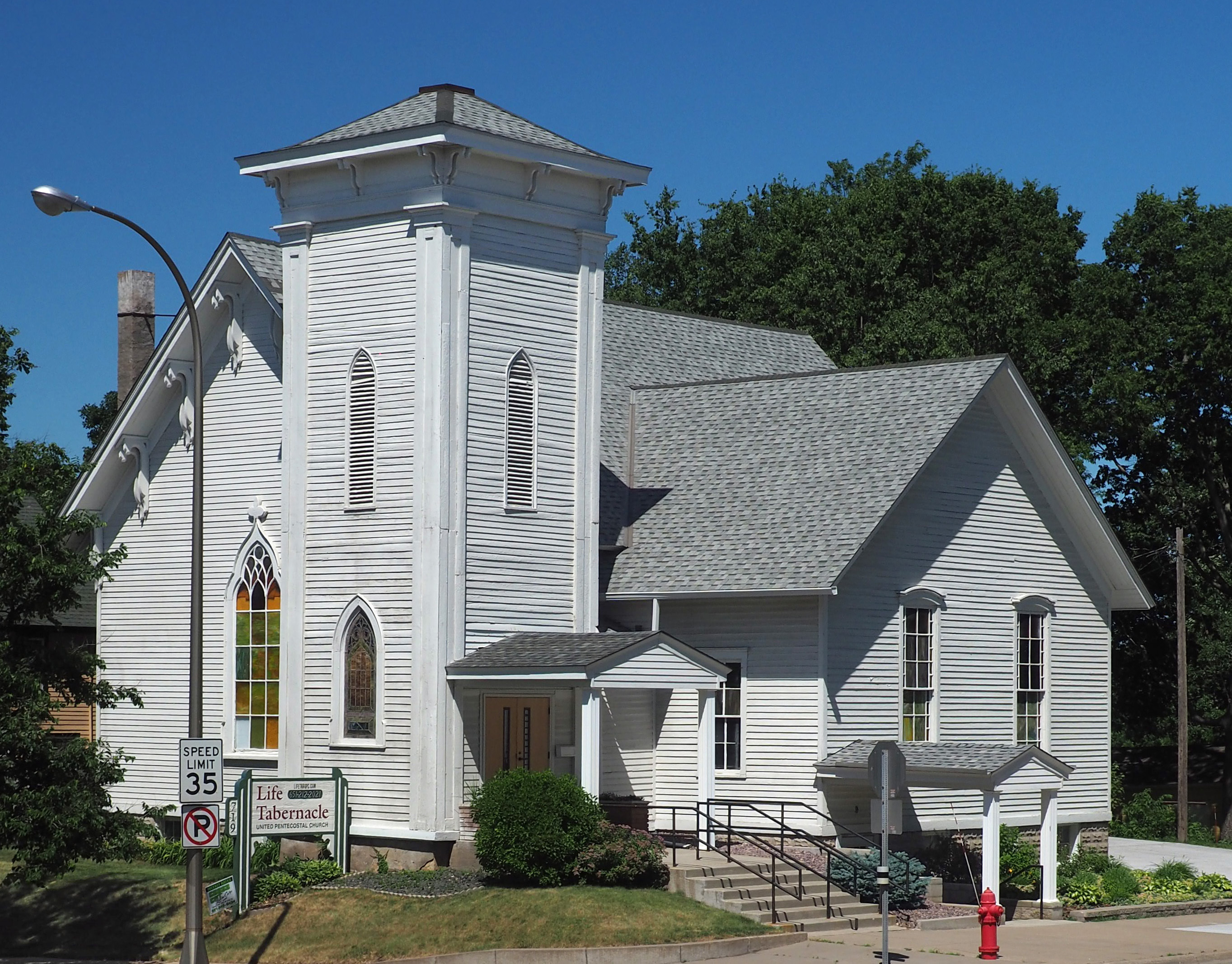
- The Hastings Methodist Episcopal Church from the southwest

- Location within Minnesota Location within the United States
- Location: 719 Vermillion Street, Hastings, Minnesota
- Coordinates: 44°44′18.48″N 92°51′8.11″W
- Built: 1862
- Architectural style: Gothic Revival, Greek Revival, and Italianate
- NRHP reference No.: 78001531
- Added to NRHP: June 7, 1978

Hastings Methodist Episcopal Church is a church building located at 719 Vermillion Street in downtown Hastings, Minnesota, United States, listed on the National Register of Historic Places. It is significant for its Gothic Revival, Greek Revival, and Italianate architecture. The building exterior is clapboard with a characteristic tower including abat-sons and emphatic eaves supported by corbels. It is the oldest church building in Hastings, originally built in 1862 on 5th Street, it was moved to its present location in 1871; at that time the tower was added. The building is currently used by the Life Tabernacle Pentecostal Church.
