= Waterford Township, Dakota County, Minnesota =

Township in Minnesota, United States

Waterford Township
- Township
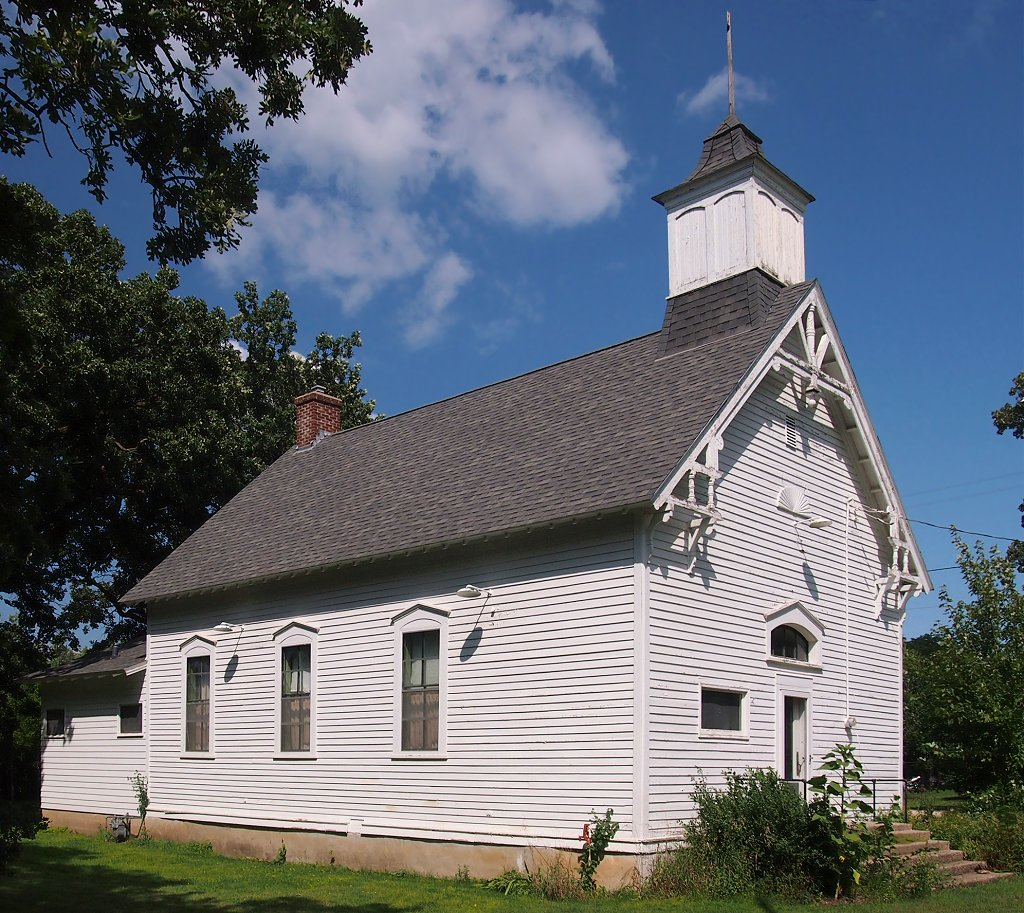
- Waterford Community Center, formerly the District No. 72 School, serves as the town hall.

- Location within the state of Minnesota Waterford Township (the United States)
- Coordinates: 44°30′13″N 93°8′17″W
- Country: United States
- State: Minnesota
- County: Dakota

Area
  - Total: 14.7 sq mi (38.2 km^{2})
  - Land: 14.7 sq mi (38.2 km^{2})
  - Water: 0 sq mi (0.0 km^{2})
- Elevation: 920 ft (280 m)

Population (2020)
  - Total: 538
  - Density: 37/sq mi (14.1/km^{2})
- Time zone: UTC-6 (Central (CST))
  - Summer (DST): UTC-5 (CDT)
- Area code: 507
- FIPS code: 27-68530
- GNIS feature ID: 0665929
- Website: https://waterfordtownshipmn.gov/

Waterford Township is a township in Dakota County, Minnesota, United States. The population was 538 at the 2020 census.

Waterford Township was organized in 1858, and named from a nearby ford crossing the Cannon River.

== Geography ==
According to the United States Census Bureau, the township has a total area of 14.8 square miles (38.2 km^{2}), all land.

== Demographics ==
Historical population
Census	Pop.	Note	%±
1860	263		—
1870	331		25.9%
1880	424		28.1%
1890	352		−17.0%
1900	322		−8.5%
1910	282		−12.4%
1920	288		2.1%
1930	360		25.0%
1940	296		−17.8%
1950	332		12.2%
1960	420		26.5%
1970	521		24.0%
1980	486		−6.7%
1990	485		−0.2%
2000	517		6.6%
2010	497		−3.9%
2020	538		8.2%
U.S. Decennial Census

As of the census of 2000, there were 517 people, 193 households, and 152 families residing in the township. The population density was 35.1 inhabitants per square mile (13.6/km^{2}). There were 196 housing units at an average density of 13.3/sq mi (5.1/km^{2}). The racial makeup of the township was 99.03% White, 0.19% African American, 0.58% from other races, and 0.19% from two or more races. Hispanic or Latino of any race were 0.58% of the population.

There were 193 households, out of which 35.2% had children under the age of 18 living with them, 65.3% were married couples living together, 7.8% had a female householder with no husband present, and 21.2% were non-families. 17.6% of all households were made up of individuals, and 8.8% had someone living alone who was 65 years of age or older. The average household size was 2.68 and the average family size was 3.01.

In the township the population was spread out, with 25.7% under the age of 18, 7.4% from 18 to 24, 28.0% from 25 to 44, 26.7% from 45 to 64, and 12.2% who were 65 years of age or older. The median age was 39 years. For every 100 females, there were 99.6 males. For every 100 females age 18 and over, there were 103.2 males.

The median income for a household in the township was $51,563, and the median income for a family was $56,875. Males had a median income of $42,589 versus $29,318 for females. The per capita income for the township was $22,570. None of the families and 1.4% of the population were living below the poverty line, including no under eighteens and none of those over 64.
