= Thompson–Fasbender House =

Historic house in Minnesota, United States

- Thompson-Fasbender House
- U.S. National Register of Historic Places
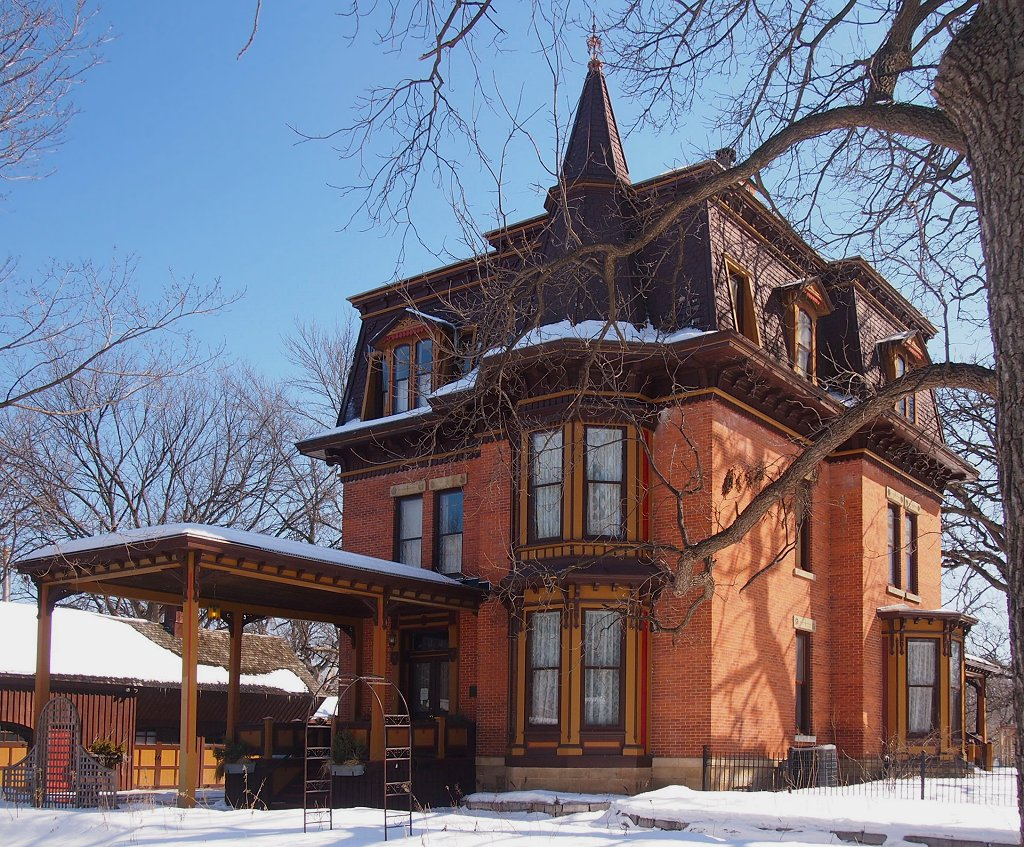
- The Thompson-Fasbender House from the northwest

- Location within Minnesota Location within the United States
- Interactive map showing the location of Thompson-Fasbender House
- Location: Hastings, Minnesota
- Coordinates: 44°44′35.82″N 92°51′41.56″W
- Built: 1880
- Architect: William Thompson
- Architectural style: Second Empire
- NRHP reference No.: 78001532
- Added to NRHP: May 22, 1978

The Thompson–Fasbender House, located at 649 West 4th Street in Hastings, Minnesota is listed on the National Register of Historic Places. It was built in 1880 by William Thompson who came to Minnesota in 1857 from Maine. He was a banker, wheat-buyer, and land-owner who also was part-owner of a saw mill and door and sash factory. His access to woodworkers is reflected in the home's finishing. Its Second Empire architecture is reflected in its mansard roof featuring scalloped wooden shingles and bracketed cornices.

In 1929, Dr. Herman Fasbender, Sr. purchased the home and transformed it into Saint Raphael Hospital, which had been housed in the VanDyke-Libby House. When the Regina Memorial Hospital opened in 1953, Saint Raphael closed and the house was converted into a tenement building; Fasbender then moved his practice to the Fasbender Clinic building. Today the home is a bed and breakfast inn.
