= Stockyards Exchange =

- U.S. National Register of Historic Places
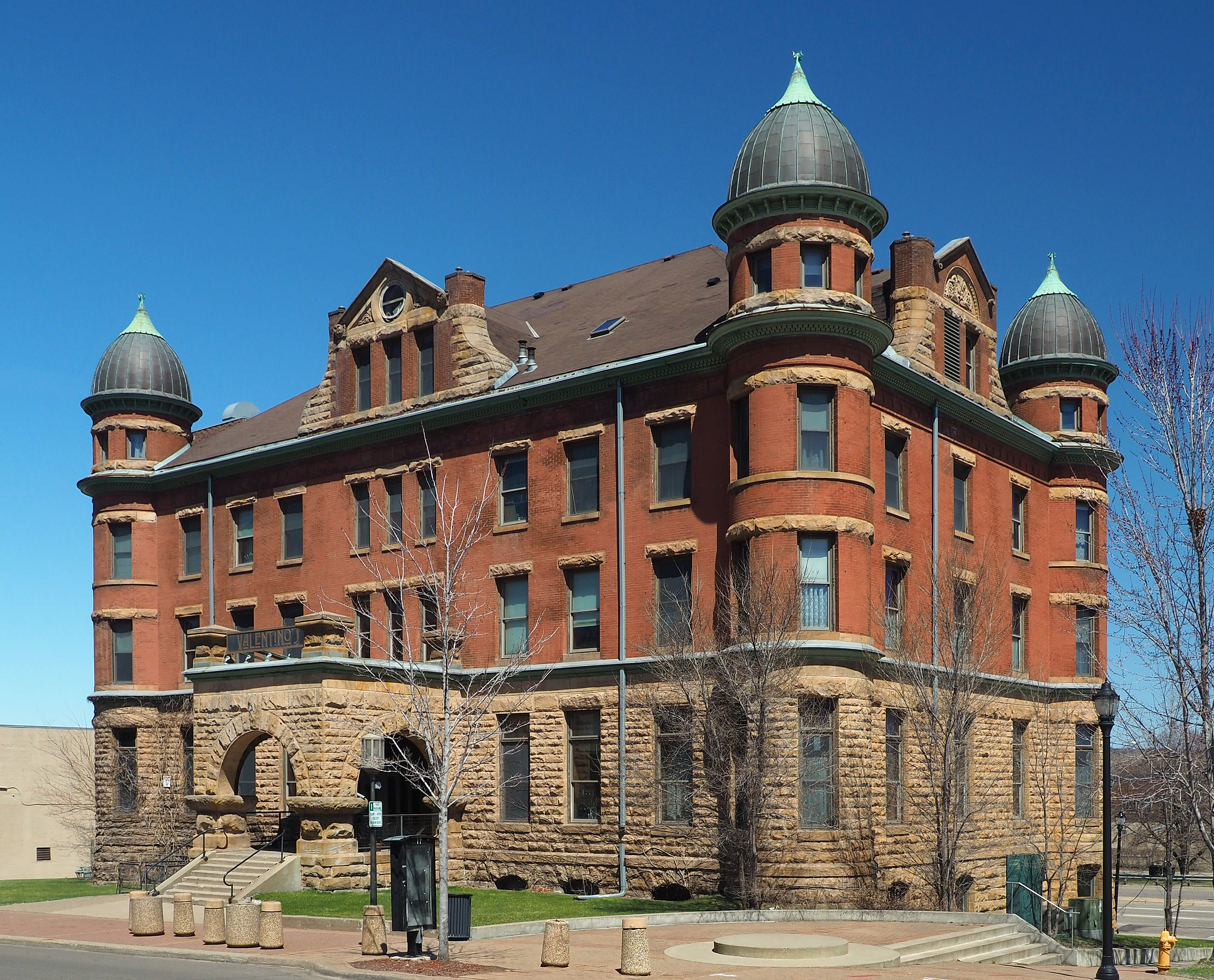
- The Stockyards Exchange viewed from the south
- Location: 200 N. Concord Street, South St. Paul, Minnesota
- Coordinates: 44°53′36″N 93°2′6″W
- Built: 1887
- Architect: Charles A. Reed
- Architectural style: Romanesque
- NRHP reference No.: 79001235
- Added to NRHP: March 7, 1979

The Stockyards Exchange is a building in South St. Paul, Minnesota, United States, built in 1887 by the recently formed Union Stock Yards Company of Omaha. The building housed businesses associated with the nearby stockyards, which later became the largest stockyards in the United States. It also housed a post office, city offices, and the city's first bank, Stockyards National Bank.

The stockyards were organized in 1886 by Alpheus Beede Stickney, who was the president of the Chicago Great Western Railway. The stockyards attracted four major meatpacking plants, including Swift & Company in 1897 and Armour and Company in 1919. During the World War II years, the stockyards operated at their peak. Due to changing market forces and the decentralization of the industry, the stockyards declined during the 1960s and 1970s. Swift closed their plant in 1969, while Armour closed their plant in the 1970s. In 1976, the South St. Paul City Council gave its Housing and Redevelopment Authority permission to buy the building. Colonial Properties bought the build in October 1979, but two months later, vandals caused major damage to the building by flooding it with fire hoses in the attic. The building was later purchased by a private developer, who was unable to raise the money to finish the renovation as scheduled. A couple opened the building in 1998 as the Castle Hotel, but it was only open a year. The building is now able to be reserved for private events.
