= Nininger, Minnesota =

Ghost town in Minnesota, United States

Coordinates: 44°46′09″N 92°54′08″W

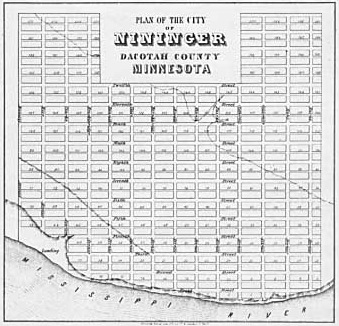
1856 plan for the City of Nininger

Nininger is a ghost town in section 18 of Nininger Township in Dakota County, Minnesota, United States.

== History ==
The city of Nininger was founded and named by John Nininger, brother in-law of territorial and state Governor Alexander Ramsey. Nininger incorporated during the winter of 1857 or 1858. Nininger had high hopes for his namesake city to become state capital, and indeed its population did reach nearly 1,000 by the spring of 1858. The city did not flourish, however, and its post office was discontinued in 1889 after 33 years of operation. Today little trace of the original city remains, although two plaques describe Good Templars Hall and Ignatius L. Donnelly's home.

== Notable person ==
The most famous resident of Nininger was author Ignatius Donnelly, who was sometimes called "The Sage of Nininger."
