= Vermilion (disambiguation) =

Vermilion is a red pigment and color.

Vermilion, Vermillion, or Vermillon may also refer to:

== Places ==
=== Communities ===
- Vermilion, Alberta, Canada, a town
- Vermilion, Illinois, United States, a village in Illinois, United States
- Vermillion, Kansas, United States, a city
- Vermilion, Michigan, an unincorporated community
- Vermillion, Minnesota, United States, a city
- Vermilion, Ohio, United States, a city
- Vermillion, South Dakota, United States, a city

=== Counties, parishes, and townships ===
- Vermilion County, Illinois, United States
- Vermillion County, Indiana, United States
- Vermilion Parish, Louisiana, United States
- Vermilion Township (disambiguation), United States and Canada

=== Bodies of water ===
- Gulf of California, also known as the Vermilion Sea
- Lake Vermilion (disambiguation)
- Little Vermilion River (disambiguation)
- Vermilion Lakes, lakes in Alberta, Canada
- Vermillion River (disambiguation)
- Vermillion Creek, Wyoming, United States

=== Other places ===
- Vermilion Cliffs, Arizona and Utah, United States
- Vermilion Point, the site of a US Life Saving Station in Michigan on the south shore of Lake Superior
- Vermilion Range (disambiguation)

== Media ==
=== Music ===
- Vermillion (The Three O'Clock album), 1988
- Vermillion (Simone Simons album), 2024
- Vermilion (Continental Drifters album), 1999
- Vermilion (Moka Only album), and the title track, 2007
- "Vermilion" (song), a 2004 song by American metal band Slipknot
- "Dakota" (song), a 2005 song by Stereophonics, formerly called "Vermilion"

=== Fictional characters ===
- Noel Vermillion, main heroine of the BlazBlue video game series
- Vermilion, a character in the Battle Arena Toshinden fighting game series
- The Vermillion (Ninjago), characters in Ninjago
- The Vermillion, a group of Androids who speak for Admiral Fukyama in the second season of the television show Legion on FX

=== Other media ===
- Vermillion (Helix), a dark science fantasy comic book series published by DC Comics
- Sword of Vermilion, a 1989 Sega Genesis game known in Japan as Vermilion

== Businesses ==
- Vermilion Energy, a natural gas company

== People ==
- Vermillion (surname), a list of people
- Vermilion tribe, a historic Native American group in Illinois

== Other uses ==
- USS Vermillion, several US Navy vessels
- Vermillion Institute, Hayesville, Ohio, United States, a co-educational school from the 1840s to c. 1929
- Vermilion, an imprint of Ebury Publishing (a division of Random House)
- Vermilion border, the boundary between the lip and the surrounding skin
- Vermilion flycatcher, a bird
- Vermilion (horse), a Japanese thoroughbred racehorse
