= Stanton, Minnesota =

Unincorporated community in Minnesota, United States

Stanton
- Unincorporated community
- Location within Minnesota Location within the United States
- Coordinates: 44°28′19″N 93°01′23″W
- Country: United States
- State: Minnesota
- County: Goodhue
- Township: Stanton
- Elevation: 922 ft (281 m)
- Time zone: UTC-6 (Central (CST))
  - Summer (DST): UTC-5 (CDT)
- ZIP code: 55009
- Area code: 507
- GNIS feature ID: 652546

Stanton is an unincorporated community in Stanton Township, Goodhue County, Minnesota, United States.

The center of Stanton is generally considered near the junction of State Highway 19 (MN 19) and State Highway 56 (MN 56). Nearby places include Northfield, Dennison, Randolph, and Cannon Falls.

Stanton is located seven miles east of Northfield. Stanton is six miles north-northeast of Dennison; and seven miles west-southwest of Cannon Falls.

Stanton is near the northwest corner of Goodhue County, and immediately adjacent to Dakota County. Rice County is also nearby.

== Community ==
Prairie Creek and the Little Cannon River both flow through the community. The Cannon River and Lake Byllesby are nearby.

The community is served by an airport, Stanton Airfield, with two grass-surfaced runways. The runways are plowed in the winter. The airport serves the sport aviation community, with a notable volume of glider, classic aircraft, and Sport Pilot activity. The airport was previously known as Carleton Airport, and still appears with that name on some maps, due to its prior association with Carleton College.

Stanton Airfield is also home of the Minnesota Soaring Club, the largest soaring club in the upper Midwest. Over 25 gliders are based at Stanton Airfield. Soaring takes place primarily on weekends from mid April through November.

Despite its small size, the airport was used by U.S. president Bill Clinton, who arrived there by helicopter for a commencement address at Carleton College in 2000.

Stanton Airfield was designated a historic site in November 2004. It has been in continuous use for flight training since April 1942, when it was used to train pilots during World War II. Stanton Airfield also has a Link Trainer, one of the first flight simulators, used to train World War II pilots.

A post office previously operated in Stanton. The post office closed in the 1970s due to federal budget cuts.
