= Lake Byllesby Dam =

Coordinates: 44°30′42″N 92°56′24″W

Byllesby Dam
- Location within Minnesota
- Country: United States
- Location: Dakota County and Goodhue County, Minnesota
- Status: Operational
- Opening date: 1910
- Owners: Dakota County, Minnesota

Dam and spillways
- Type of dam: Concrete gravity dam
- Impounds: Cannon River
- Height: 75-foot (23 m)

Reservoir
- Creates: Lake Byllesby
- Total capacity: 20,000 acre-feet (25,000,000 m^{3})
- Surface area: 1,432 acres (580 ha)

Lake Byllesby Dam is a concrete gravity dam located in Randolph Township, Dakota County and Stanton Township, Goodhue County, Minnesota, just west of the city of Cannon Falls. It is approximately 30 miles (48 km) southeast of the Twin Cities.

The 75-foot (23 m)-high dam was built in 1910 by H.M. Byllesby & Company to impound the Cannon River for hydroelectric power. Its nameplate capacity is 1.8 MW. Byllesby, a former employee of both Edison and Westinghouse, formed what would become Northern States Power in 1909.

The dam created Lake Byllesby, with a surface area of 1,432 acres (580 ha) and a capacity of 20,000 acre-feet (25,000,000 m^{3}).

The facility is owned and operated by Dakota County.
