= Etter, Minnesota =

Unincorporated community in Minnesota, United States

Etter
- Unincorporated community
- Location within Minnesota Location within the United States
- Coordinates: 44°39′42″N 92°44′38″W
- Country: United States
- State: Minnesota
- County: Dakota County
- Township: Ravenna Township
- Elevation: 699 ft (213 m)
- Time zone: UTC-6 (Central (CST))
  - Summer (DST): UTC-5 (CDT)
- ZIP code: 55033
- Area code: 651
- GNIS feature ID: 656173

Etter is an unincorporated community in Ravenna Township, Dakota County, Minnesota, United States, near Hastings and Welch. It is along 200th Street East (County Road 68) near Ravenna Trail (County Road 54). State Highway 316 (MN 316) is nearby.

A post office called Etter was established in 1871, and remained in operation until it was discontinued in 1927. The community was named for Alexander Etter, a storekeeper.
