= Vermillion (surname) =

Vermillion is a surname. Notable people with the surname include:

- Charles W. Vermillion, a justice of the Iowa Supreme Court from 1923 to 1927
- Iris Vermillion (born 1960), German operatic mezzo-soprano
- Laurel Vermillion, American educator and academic administrator
- Sydney Vermillion (born 1988), American–Armenian footballer
- Texas Jack Vermillion (1842–1911), American Old West gunfighter
- Joseph Vermillion, American lynched in 1889
