= Justice Given =

Justice Given may refer to:

- Josiah Given (1828–1908), associate justice of the Iowa Supreme Court
- Leslie E. Given (1893–1962), associate justice of the Supreme Court of Appeals of West Virginia

== See also ==
- Richard M. Givan (1921–2009), associate justice and chief justice of the Indiana Supreme Court
