= Steven Engler =

Steven Engler may refer to:

- Steven Engler (religion scholar), Canadian scholar of religion
- Steven Engler (politician), member of the Minnesota Senate

== See also ==
- Stefan Engler, Swiss politician
