= Vermillion Township =

Vermillion Township may refer to:

== Canada ==
- Vermillion Township, Kenora District, Ontario

== United States ==
- Vermillion Township, LaSalle County, Illinois
- Vermillion Township, Vermillion County, Indiana
- Vermillion Township, Appanoose County, Iowa
- Vermillion Township, Marshall County, Kansas, in Marshall County, Kansas
- Vermillion Township, Dakota County, Minnesota
- Vermillion Township, Ashland County, Ohio
- Vermillion Township, Clay County, South Dakota, in Clay County, South Dakota

== See also ==
- Vermilion Township, Erie County, Ohio
- Vermillion (disambiguation)
