= Justice Wagner =

Justice Wagner may refer to:

- David Wagner (judge) (1826–1902), associate justice of the Supreme Court of Missouri
- Henry F. Wagner (died 1943), associate justice of the Supreme Court of Iowa
