= Little Vermilion River =

Little Vermilion River may refer to the following rivers in Illinois, U.S.:

- Little Vermilion River (Illinois River tributary)
- Little Vermilion River (Wabash River tributary)

== See also ==
- Vermilion (disambiguation)
- Vermillion River (disambiguation)
