= Dakota County, Minnesota =

County in Minnesota, United States

- County
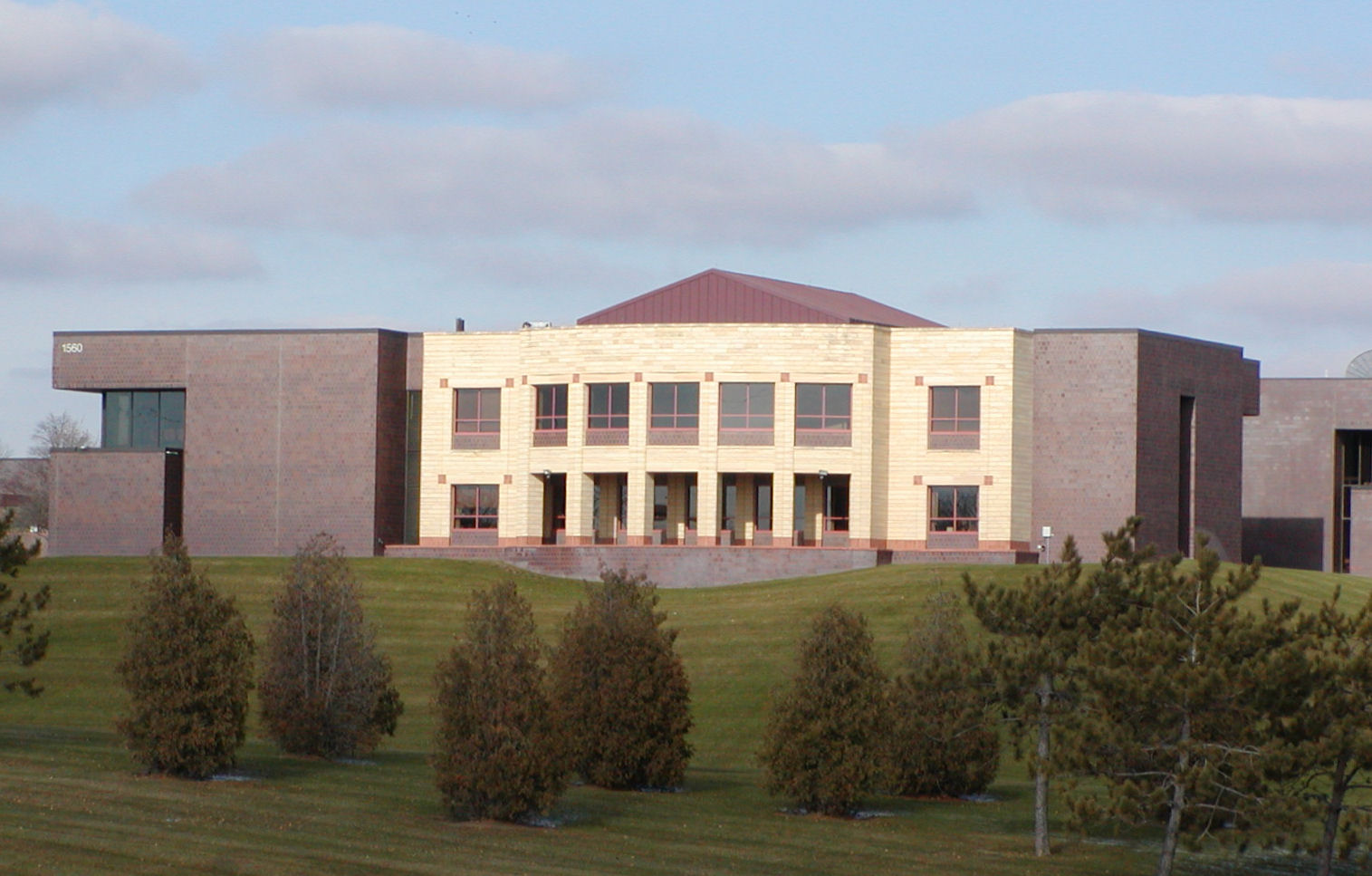
- Dakota County Courthouse

- Location within the U.S. state of Minnesota
- Coordinates: 44°41′N 93°04′W
- Country: United States
- State: Minnesota
- Founded: October 27, 1849
- Named for: the Dakota people
- Seat: Hastings
- Largest city: Lakeville

Area
  - Total: 587 sq mi (1,520 km^{2})
  - Land: 562 sq mi (1,460 km^{2})
  - Water: 25 sq mi (65 km^{2}) 4.2%

Population (2020)
  - Total: 439,882
  - Estimate (2025): 455,710 ▲
  - Density: 783/sq mi (302/km^{2})
- Time zone: UTC−6 (Central)
  - Summer (DST): UTC−5 (CDT)
- Congressional district: 2nd
- Website: www.co.dakota.mn.us/Pages/default.aspx

Dakota County is the third-most populous county in the U.S. state of Minnesota, located in the east central portion of the state. As of the 2020 census, the population was 439,882. The population of Dakota County was estimated to be 455,710 in 2025. The county seat is Hastings. Dakota County is named for the Dakota Sioux tribal bands who inhabited the area. The name is recorded as "Dahkotah" in the United States Census records until 1851. Dakota County is included in the Minneapolis–St. Paul–Bloomington, MN–WI Metropolitan Statistical Area, the sixteenth largest metropolitan area in the United States with about 3.71 million residents. The largest city in Dakota County is the city of Lakeville, the ninth-largest city in Minnesota and fifth-largest Twin Cities suburb. The county is bordered by the Minnesota and Mississippi Rivers on the north, and the state of Wisconsin on the east.

== History ==
The county was the site of historical events at Mendota that defined the state's future, including providing materials for the construction of Fort Snelling across the river and the signing of the Treaty of Mendota which ceded land from the native Dakota nation for the Minnesota Territory. The county's history was initially tied to the confluence of the Mississippi and Minnesota Rivers, both strategically important for United States expansion and as the convergence of the Dakota and Ojibwe nations who regarded the site as sacred. Influence shifted westward during the post-World War II settlement boom when Interstate 35 connected the western half of the county to Minneapolis and Saint Paul and bedroom communities grew. Most work outside the county but like many metro counties, Dakota County continues to absorb industry and jobs from the core cities.

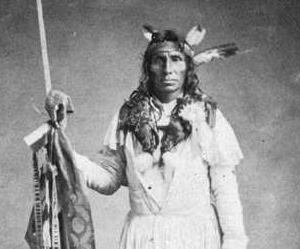
Taoyateduta led the Mendota Mdewakanton in northern Dakota County. He and 121 Sioux leaders ceded much of the present Twin Cities region.

In the 1600s, Mdewakanton Dakota fled their ancestral home of Mille Lacs Lake in northern Minnesota in response to westward expansion of the Ojibwe nation. According to Dakota tradition, their ancestors pushed out the Iowa who were found settled at the mouth of the Minnesota River. In 1680, the Mdewakanton Dakota were contacted by French explorer Daniel Greysolon, Sieur du Lhut, and the Mendota (mdo-TE) band of the Mdewakanton south of the Minnesota River were contacted by Joseph Nicollet in the 18th century. While Taoyateduta (a.k.a. Little Crow) led the Mendota in northern Dakota County, upstream to the southwest, Chief Black Dog established his village of 600 people around 1750 at the isthmus between Black Dog Lake (which is named after him) and the Minnesota River, near the present site of the Black Dog Power Plant.

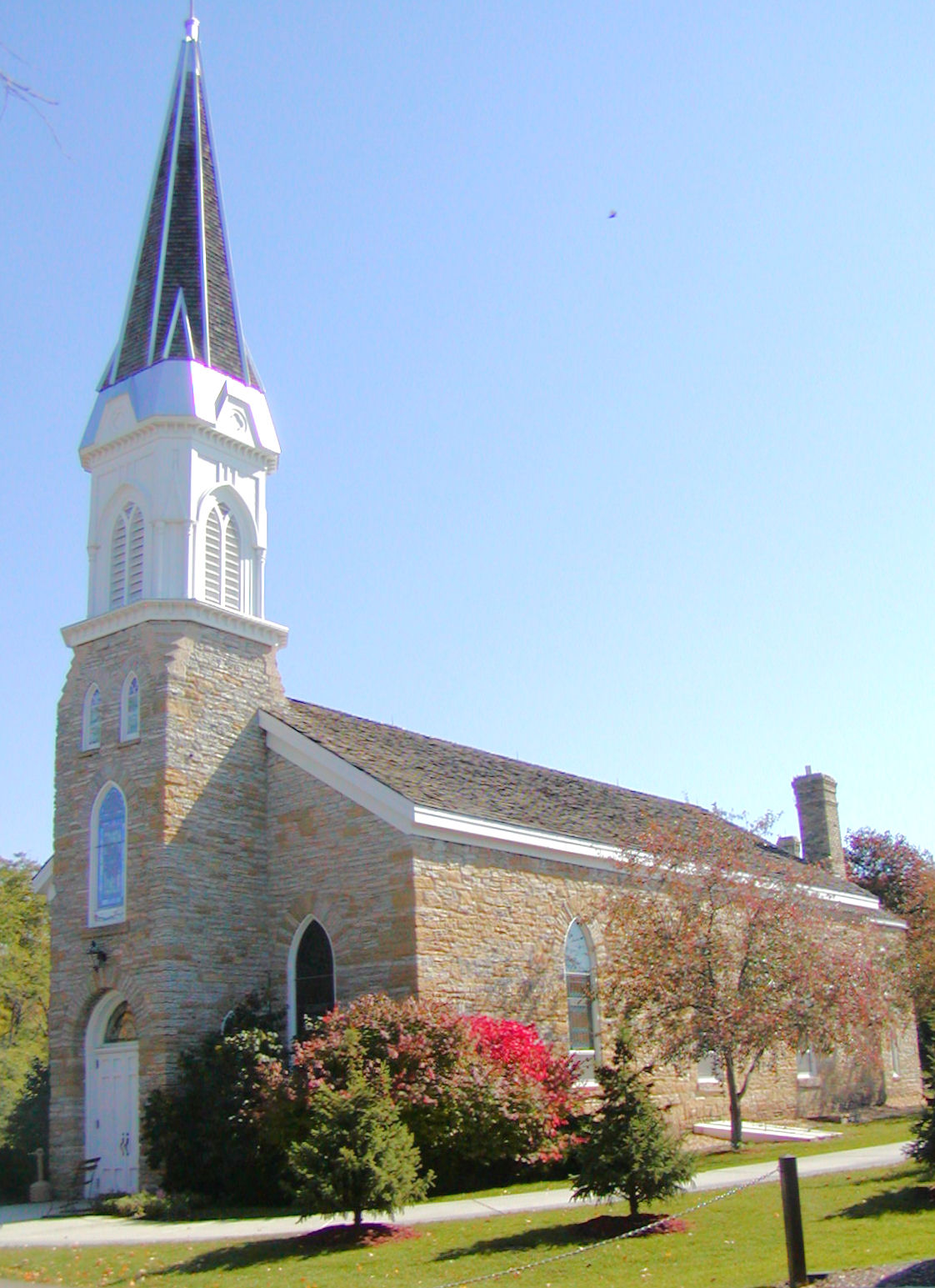
Saint Peter's Church in Mendota is the state's oldest church

Following the published expeditions of explorers, in 1805, Zebulon Pike negotiated for military territory with the Mendota band which included land in Dakota County at the Mississippi River confluences with the Minnesota and St. Croix Rivers. In 1819, on what is now Picnic Island on the south bank of the Minnesota River, Colonel Henry Leavenworth built a stockade fort called "St. Peter's Cantonment" or "New Hope," where materials were assembled for the construction of Fort Snelling to be built on the bluff on the north bank. Permanent settlement on the island was impossible due to annual flooding. Alexis Bailey built some log buildings nearby to trade in furs in 1826. Henry Hastings Sibley later built the first stone house in Minnesota in 1836, overlooking Fort Snelling. Sibley was a partner in the American Fur Company, and considerable fur trade occurred at Mendota due to the accessibility of the confluence.

Ongoing United States expansion into the then "Northwest Territory" led to government purchase of land from the Dakota people (the Mdewakanton, Wahpekute, Wahpeton, and Sisseton bands) via the Treaty of St. Peters, the Treaty of Traverse des Sioux, and the Treaty of Mendota in 1851. After the Minnesota Territory was established in 1849, Dakotah County (later Dakota County) spanned from the Mississippi River to the Missouri River. By the time Minnesota achieved statehood in 1858, power and influence had shifted from Mendota, across the rivers to Saint Paul and Minneapolis.

=== Hastings and South St. Paul ===
By 1900, the hub of activity in the county was in Hastings, the county seat, and a focal point of transportation, communication, and commerce. St. Peter's, now Mendota, had lost out to Fort Snelling. Hastings is located on the Mississippi River at the confluence of the St. Croix River and on the Vermillion River, which provided ample water power. Lumber, milling, and railroads provided good incomes. During this time, the stockyards and meat-packing plants in South St. Paul, Minnesota became the world's largest stockyards. Ranchers in the west shipped their livestock to St. Louis, Memphis, and New Orleans. These plants were worked by immigrants from Romania, Serbia, and other Eastern European countries. The rest of the county remained agricultural during the boom of milling activity north of the Minnesota River due to lack of bridge connections. Rail access came in 1866 via the Chicago, St. Paul, Minneapolis, and Omaha Railroad which shipped grain to millers. The Minneapolis St. Paul Rochester and Dubuque Electric Traction Company line in 1905 (now the Dan Patch Corridor), was primary for passengers going to resorts in Burnsville and Lakeville.

=== Suburban growth ===
By the 1950s, population growth shifted to western Dakota County, which had been predominantly Irish and Scottish extending southward toward the Scandinavians of Southern Minnesota. As population pressures expanded south from Minneapolis and Bloomington, the completion of Interstate 35W and 35E brought about major construction in the post-World War II period, turning villages into cities within 20 years. Burnsville, Apple Valley, Eagan, and Lakeville brought over 200,000 people into the county by the end of the century. The Western and Northern Service Centers were constructed in the early 1990s each with an additional courthouse location. License centers were subsequently set up in Burnsville and Lakeville. Though pressure remained since the postwar boom to move the county seat to a larger community, the Dakota County Board maintained the seat in Hastings, while providing government services across the county.

=== Historic sites ===
The Registered Historic Places in the county include the settlement at Mendota, the homes of well-heeled residents of Hastings, the ethnic gathering places in South Saint Paul, and other sites related to life on the prairie.

== Politics and government ==
=== Local government ===
Dakota County is governed by the Board of Commissioners. The members of the Board as of August 25, 2025, are:

- Mike Slavik, District 1
- Joe Atkins, District 2
- Laurie Halverson, District 3
- William Droste, District 4
- Liz Workman, District 5
- Mary Liz Holberg, District 6
- Mary Hamann-Roland, District 7

Dakota County has an elected Sheriff (Joe Leko) and an elected County Attorney (Kathryn M. Keena). There are appointed boards for the library system, community development agency, and several advisory boards. Dakota County is served by an elected board of the Soil and Water Conservation District.

=== Politics ===
Dakota County voters tend to vote Democratic. Since 1960, the county has selected the Democratic Party candidate in 71% of national elections (as of 2020).

United States presidential election results for Dakota County, Minnesota
Year	Republican		Democratic		Third party(ies)	
Year	No.	%	No.	%	No.	%
1892	1,481	37.95%	1,989	50.97%	432	11.07%
1896	2,147	46.41%	2,310	49.94%	169	3.65%
1900	1,904	47.64%	1,878	46.99%	215	5.38%
1904	2,685	68.69%	1,078	27.58%	146	3.73%
1908	2,481	55.07%	1,778	39.47%	246	5.46%
1912	609	14.20%	1,777	41.42%	1,904	44.38%
1916	1,881	41.73%	2,373	52.64%	254	5.63%
1920	5,373	66.45%	2,190	27.08%	523	6.47%
1924	3,931	42.34%	929	10.01%	4,424	47.65%
1928	6,019	45.18%	7,215	54.15%	89	0.67%
1932	4,439	32.56%	8,958	65.70%	238	1.75%
1936	4,043	26.26%	8,890	57.73%	2,465	16.01%
1940	8,339	47.00%	9,327	52.57%	77	0.43%
1944	7,731	47.13%	8,562	52.20%	110	0.67%
1948	6,819	34.75%	12,487	63.63%	317	1.62%
1952	11,871	49.71%	11,890	49.79%	118	0.49%
1956	13,112	50.74%	12,672	49.04%	55	0.21%
1960	15,032	42.62%	20,150	57.13%	91	0.26%
1964	13,856	32.73%	28,391	67.07%	81	0.19%
1968	19,290	38.65%	28,416	56.94%	2,202	4.41%
1972	34,967	53.96%	28,479	43.95%	1,350	2.08%
1976	37,542	44.65%	44,253	52.63%	2,285	2.72%
1980	40,708	42.96%	43,433	45.84%	10,614	11.20%
1984	55,119	52.54%	49,125	46.83%	667	0.64%
1988	61,606	49.45%	61,942	49.72%	1,032	0.83%
1992	52,312	33.30%	63,660	40.53%	41,108	26.17%
1996	57,244	37.11%	77,297	50.11%	19,725	12.79%
2000	87,250	47.87%	85,446	46.88%	9,553	5.24%
2004	108,959	50.48%	104,635	48.48%	2,252	1.04%
2008	104,364	46.29%	116,778	51.79%	4,330	1.92%
2012	109,516	47.45%	116,255	50.37%	5,050	2.19%
2016	99,864	43.07%	110,592	47.70%	21,404	9.23%
2020	109,638	41.81%	146,155	55.73%	6,466	2.47%
2024	109,995	42.34%	143,267	55.14%	6,543	2.52%

== Geography ==
Soils of Dakota County

The county terrain consists of low rolling hills, sloping to the river valleys. Its highest point is at Buck Hill in Burnsville, at 1,168 feet above sea level. The county has a total area of 587 square miles (1,520 km^{2}), of which 562 square miles (1,460 km^{2}) is land and 25 square miles (65 km^{2}) (4.2%) is water.

=== Rivers ===
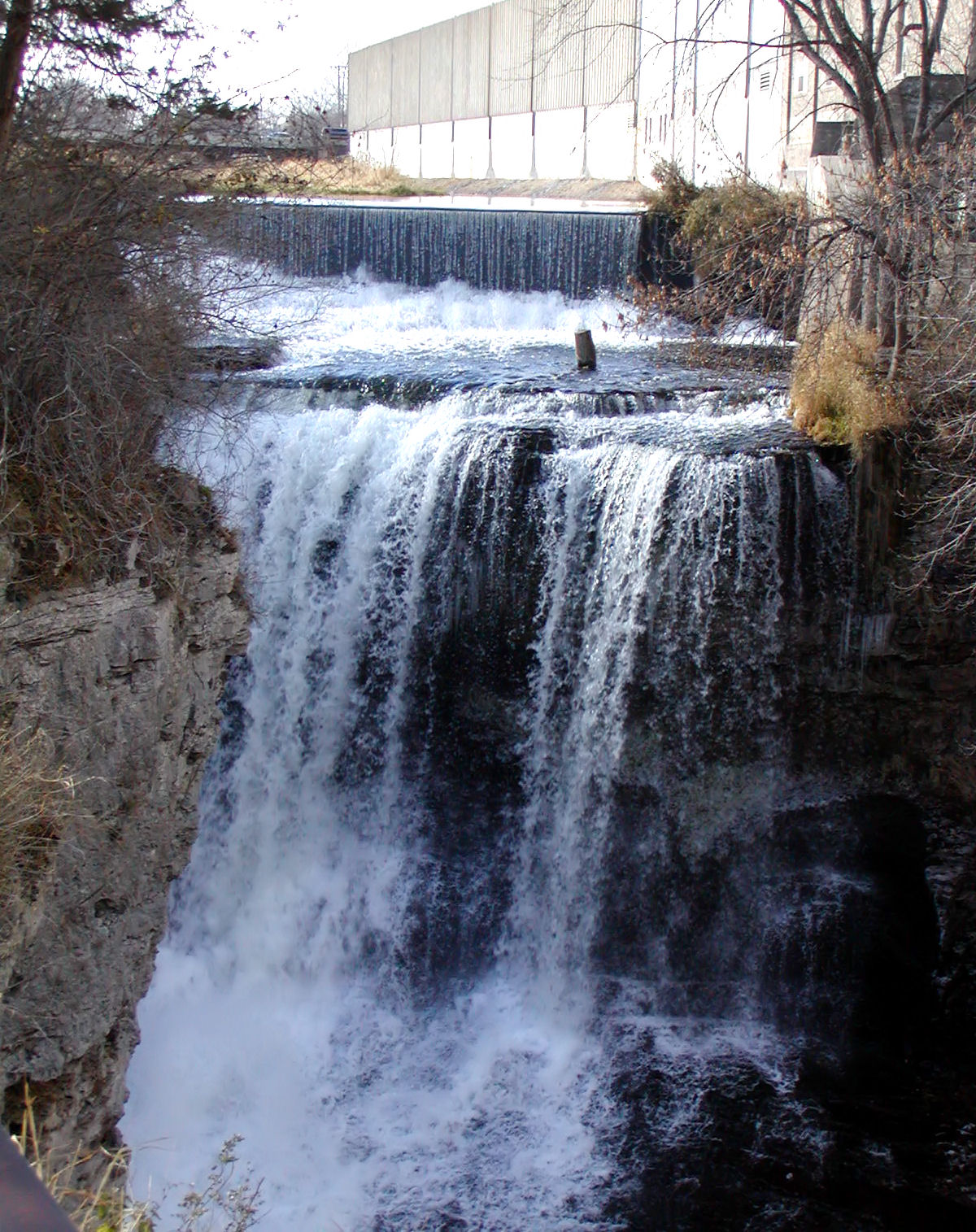
Vermillion Falls in Hastings

The northern and eastern boundaries of Dakota County are marked by the Minnesota and Mississippi Rivers. Management and jurisdiction of the rivers falls into multiple local, State and Federal agencies. Most of the Minnesota River bank is under the Minnesota Valley National Wildlife Refuge with fish, wildlife, and parkland managed collectively by the United States Fish and Wildlife Service and the Minnesota Department of Natural Resources. The Dakota County Soil and Water Conservation District assists the county's six watershed management organizations (WMO) which include the Black Dog WMO, Gun Club Lake WMO, Lower Minnesota River Watershed District, Lower Mississippi WMO, North Cannon River WMO, and the Vermillion River Watershed Joint Powers Organization.

- Mississippi River: Adjacent to Mendota Heights, Lilydale, South St. Paul, Inver Grove Heights, Rosemount, and Hastings.
- Minnesota River: Adjacent to Burnsville, Eagan, Mendota Heights, and Mendota.
- Vermillion River: From Farmington through Empire to Hastings.
- Cannon River: Adjacent to Randolph and through Randolph Township.

=== Lakes ===
Apple Valley
- Alimagenet Lake
- Cobblestone Lake
- Farquar Lake
- Keller Lake
- Long Lake

Burnsville

- Alimagnet Lake
- Crystal Lake
- Earley Lake

Eagan

- Blackhawk Lake
- Fish Lake
- Holland Lake
- Jensen Lake
- Thomas Lake

Eureka Township

- Chub Lake

Hastings

- Lake Rebecca
- Lake Isabelle
- Spring Lake
- Bullfrog Pond

Lakeville

- Lake Marion
- Orchard Lake
- Kingsley Lake
- Valley Lake
- Lee Lake

Lilydale

- Pickerel Lake

Randolph Township

- Lake Byllesby

Ravenna Township

- Mud Hen Lakes

Rosemount

- Keegan Lake

West Saint Paul

- Thompson Lake

South St. Paul

- Siedls Lake

=== Major highways ===
- Interstate 35
- Interstate 35E
- Interstate 35W
- Interstate 494
- US Highway 52
- US Highway 61
- Minnesota State Highway 3
- Minnesota State Highway 13
- Minnesota State Highway 19
- Minnesota State Highway 20
- Minnesota State Highway 50
- Minnesota State Highway 55
- Minnesota State Highway 56
- Minnesota State Highway 62
- Minnesota State Highway 77
- Minnesota State Highway 149
- Minnesota State Highway 316
- County Road 42
- County Road 23
- Other County Roads

=== Adjacent counties ===
- Ramsey County - north
- Washington County - northeast
- Pierce County, Wisconsin - east
- Goodhue County - southeast
- Rice County - southwest
- Scott County - west
- Hennepin County - northwest

=== Protected areas ===
The following protected areas are within or partially within Dakota County:

- Chub Lake Wildlife Management Area
- Fort Snelling State Park (part)
- Hastings Sand Coulee Scientific and Natural Area
- Miesville Ravine Park Reserve (part)
- Minnesota Valley National Wildlife Refuge (part)
- Mississippi National River and Recreation Area (part)
- Murphy-Hanrehan Park Reserve (part)
- National Wildlife Refuge, Bloomington (part)
- Spring Lake Regional Park & Park Reserve
- Vermillion Highlands
- Whitetail Woods Regional Park

=== Parks ===
The following parks are located within Dakota County:

- Big Rivers Regional Trail
- Dakota County Bikeway System
- Dakota Woods Dog Park
- Lake Byllesby Regional Park
- Lebanon Hills Regional Park
- Thompson County Park

== Economy ==
Since the county grew as a bedroom community of Minneapolis and Saint Paul, over half of the residents (54%) work outside the county.

== Demographics ==
Historical population
Census	Pop.	Note	%±
1850	584		—
1860	9,093		1,457.0%
1870	16,312		79.4%
1880	17,391		6.6%
1890	20,240		16.4%
1900	21,733		7.4%
1910	25,171		15.8%
1920	28,967		15.1%
1930	34,592		19.4%
1940	39,660		14.7%
1950	49,019		23.6%
1960	78,303		59.7%
1970	139,808		78.5%
1980	194,279		39.0%
1990	275,227		41.7%
2000	355,904		29.3%
2010	398,552		12.0%
2020	439,882		10.4%
2025 (est.)	457,710	▲	4.1%
U.S. Decennial Census; 1790-1960 1900-1990; 1990-2000 2010-2020

=== 2020 census ===
As of the 2020 census, the county had a population of 439,882. The median age was 38.6 years. 24.4% of residents were under the age of 18 and 14.8% of residents were 65 years of age or older. For every 100 females there were 95.9 males, and for every 100 females age 18 and over there were 93.2 males age 18 and over.

95.0% of residents lived in urban areas, while 5.0% lived in rural areas.

There were 168,008 households in the county, of which 33.0% had children under the age of 18 living in them. Of all households, 53.6% were married-couple households, 15.4% were households with a male householder and no spouse or partner present, and 24.2% were households with a female householder and no spouse or partner present. About 24.7% of all households were made up of individuals and 10.0% had someone living alone who was 65 years of age or older.

There were 173,469 housing units, of which 3.1% were vacant. Among occupied housing units, 74.0% were owner-occupied and 26.0% were renter-occupied. The homeowner vacancy rate was 0.6% and the rental vacancy rate was 4.8%.

=== Racial and ethnic composition ===
Dakota County, Michigan – Racial and ethnic composition Note: the US Census treats Hispanic/Latino as an ethnic category. This table excludes Latinos from the racial categories and assigns them to a separate category. Hispanics/Latinos may be of any race.
Race / Ethnicity (NH = Non-Hispanic)	Pop 1980	Pop 1990	Pop 2000	Pop 2010	Pop 2020	% 1980	% 1990	% 2000	% 2010	% 2020
White alone (NH)	188,815	262,332	320,242	327,962	323,629	97.19%	95.31%	89.98%	82.29%	73.57%
Black or African American alone (NH)	1,137	3,363	7,941	18,235	32,191	0.59%	1.22%	2.23%	4.58%	7.32%
Native American or Alaska Native alone (NH)	451	848	1,203	1,339	1,490	0.23%	0.31%	0.34%	0.34%	0.34%
Asian alone (NH)	1,553	4,531	10,220	17,350	23,932	0.80%	1.65%	2.87%	4.35%	5.44%
Native Hawaiian or Pacific Islander alone (NH)	x	x	138	199	184	x	x	0.04%	0.05%	0.04%
Other race alone (NH)	453	128	500	647	2,144	0.23%	0.05%	0.14%	0.16%	0.49%
Mixed race or Multiracial (NH)	x	x	5,201	8,854	20,007	x	x	1.46%	2.22%	4.55%
Hispanic or Latino (any race)	1,870	4,025	10,459	23,966	36,305	0.96%	1.46%	2.94%	6.01%	8.25%
Total	194,279	275,227	355,904	398,552	439,882	100.00%	100.00%	100.00%	100.00%	100.00%

=== 2010 census ===
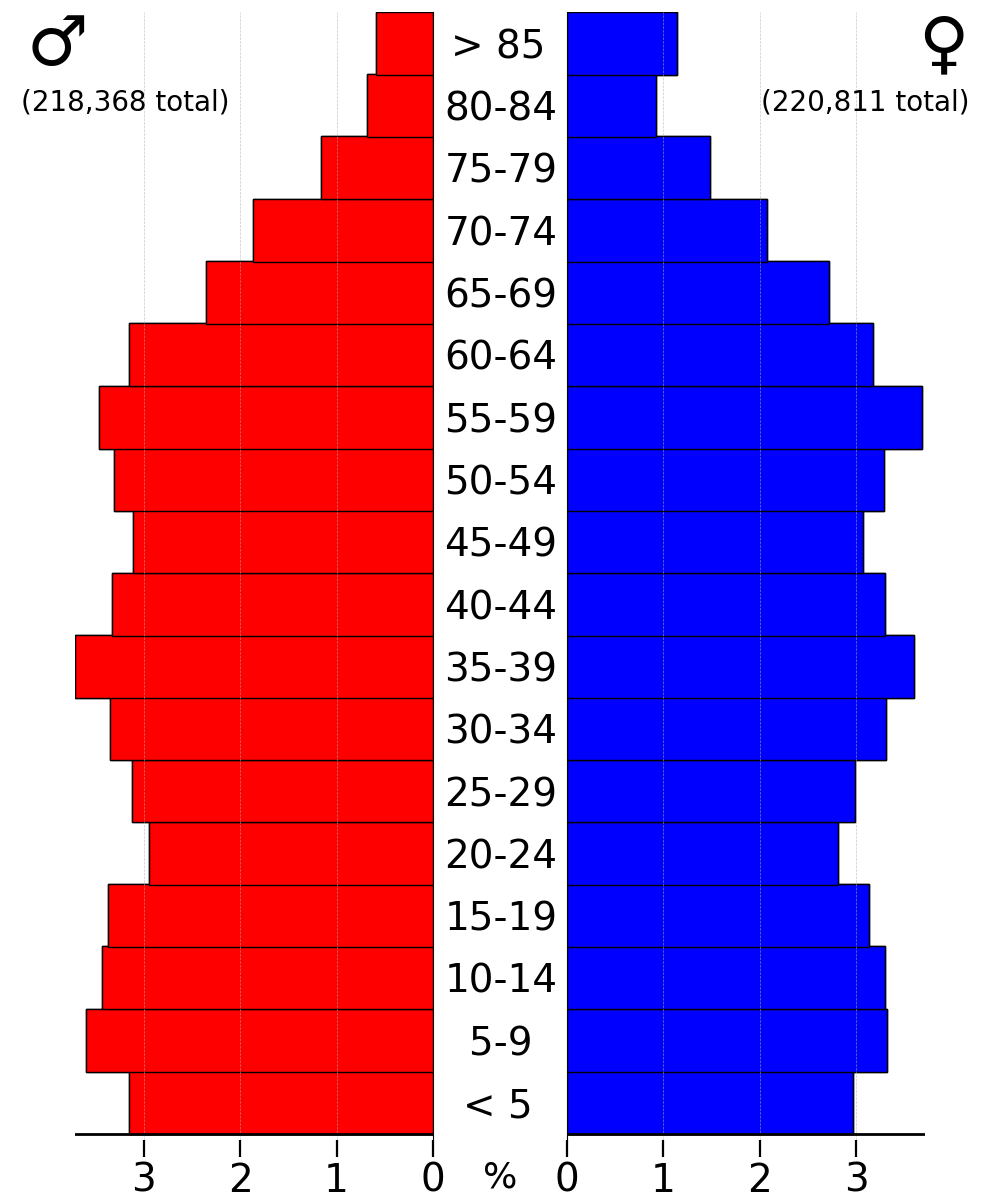
2022 US Census population pyramid for Dakota County, from ACS 5-year estimates

As of the census of 2010, Dakota County had a population of 398,552, of which 195,661 (49.1%) were male and 202,891 (50.9%) were female. In terms of age, 76.7% of the population were 16 years and over, 73.6% were 18 years and over, 70.5% were 21 years and over, 12.8% were 62 years and over, and 10.0% were 65 years and over. The median age was 36.8 years. The median age for males was 35.7; the median age for females was 37.9.

In terms of race and ethnicity, the county was 85.2% White (82.3% Non-Hispanic White), 4.7% Black or African American, 0.4% American Indian and Alaska Native, 4.4% Asian, 0.1% Native Hawaiian and Other Pacific Islander, 2.4% from some other race, and 2.9% from two or more races. Hispanics and Latinos of any race made up 6.0% of the population.

In terms of households, 69.5% were family households and 30.5% were non-family households. Approximately 55.2% were husband-wife family households; 26% had children under 18 years of age. Approximately 36.6% of households had children under 18 years of age living in them; 18.6% had people over the age of 65 living in them. The average household size was 2.60 and the average family size was 3.12. In terms of housing occupancy, 95.3% of households were occupied and 4.7% were vacant. Of the vacant housing units, 2.0% were for rent, 0.1% were rented but not occupied, 1.2% were for sale only, 0.2% were sold but not occupied, 0.5% were for seasonal, recreational, or occasional use, and 0.8% were all other vacants. The homeowner vacancy rate was 1.7% and the rental vacancy rate was 8.1%. Of all occupied housing units, 76.5% were owner-occupied and 23.5% were renter-occupied. The population in owner-occupied units was 314,833; the average household size was 2.71. The population in renter-occupied units was 80,866; the average household size was 2.26.

== Education ==
Dakota County is home to the state's largest school districts and some of the highest paid Superintendents. Independent School District 196 (Rosemount–Apple Valley–Eagan) houses over 29,000 students and is the third-largest school district in the state. Other districts include Independent School District 191 (Burnsville–Eagan–Savage School District), Independent School District 194 (Lakeville–Elko–New Market), Independent School District 197 (West St. Paul–Mendota Heights–Eagan), Independent School District 200 (Hastings), Special School District 6 (South St. Paul).

=== School districts ===
School districts include:

- Burnsville Public School District
- Cannon Falls Public School District
- Farmington Public School District
- Hastings Public School District
- Inver Grove Heights Schools
- Lakeville Public School District
- Northfield Public School District
- Randolph Public School District
- Rosemount-Apple Valley-Eagan School District
- South St. Paul Public School District
- West St. Paul-Mendota Heights-Eagan School District

=== Colleges and universities ===
- Dakota County Technical College
- Inver Hills Community College

=== Libraries ===
- Burnhaven Library in Burnsville
- Farmington Library in Farmington
- Galaxie Library in Apple Valley
- Heritage Library in Lakeville
- Inver Glen Library in Inver Grove Heights
- Pleasant Hill Library in Hastings
- Robert Trail Library in Rosemount
- Kaposia Library in South St. Paul
- Wentworth Library in West St. Paul
- Wescott Library in Eagan

== Communities ==
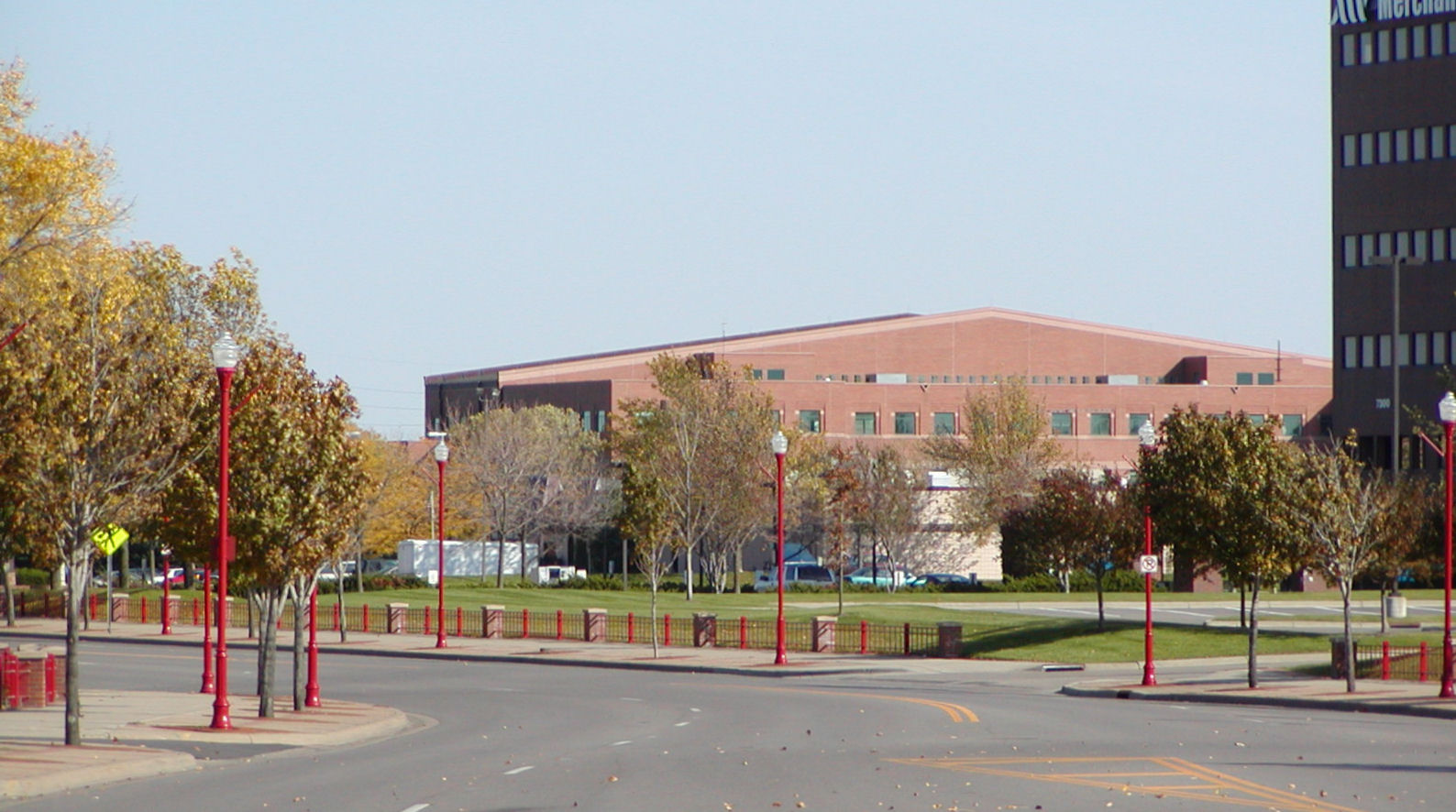
Street in downtown Apple Valley with signature red lamp posts. In the background is the Western Service Center.

Dakota County is home to sites significant in the state's early history. At Mendota, the Treaty of Mendota was signed, opening Southern Minnesota to settlement, and prominent Saint Paul businessmen built their mansions there. Though linked with the state's capital for much of history via rail, Dakota County owes much of its current growth to the expansion of Minneapolis' population which accelerated during the post-World War II boom era of the 1960s. This demand for housing along with two major interstate highways linking Minneapolis (I-35W) and St. Paul (I-35E) to the county, concentrated major growth and demand along the northern end. Today, the cities of Burnsville, Eagan, Apple Valley, Lakeville, Rosemount, Hastings, Inver Grove Heights, Mendota Heights, West St. Paul, and South St. Paul are synonymous with the Twin Cities, as being part of "the Cities." Both Burnsville and Eagan are nearly developed and have become more like independent cities attracting major development than mere residential bedroom suburbs.

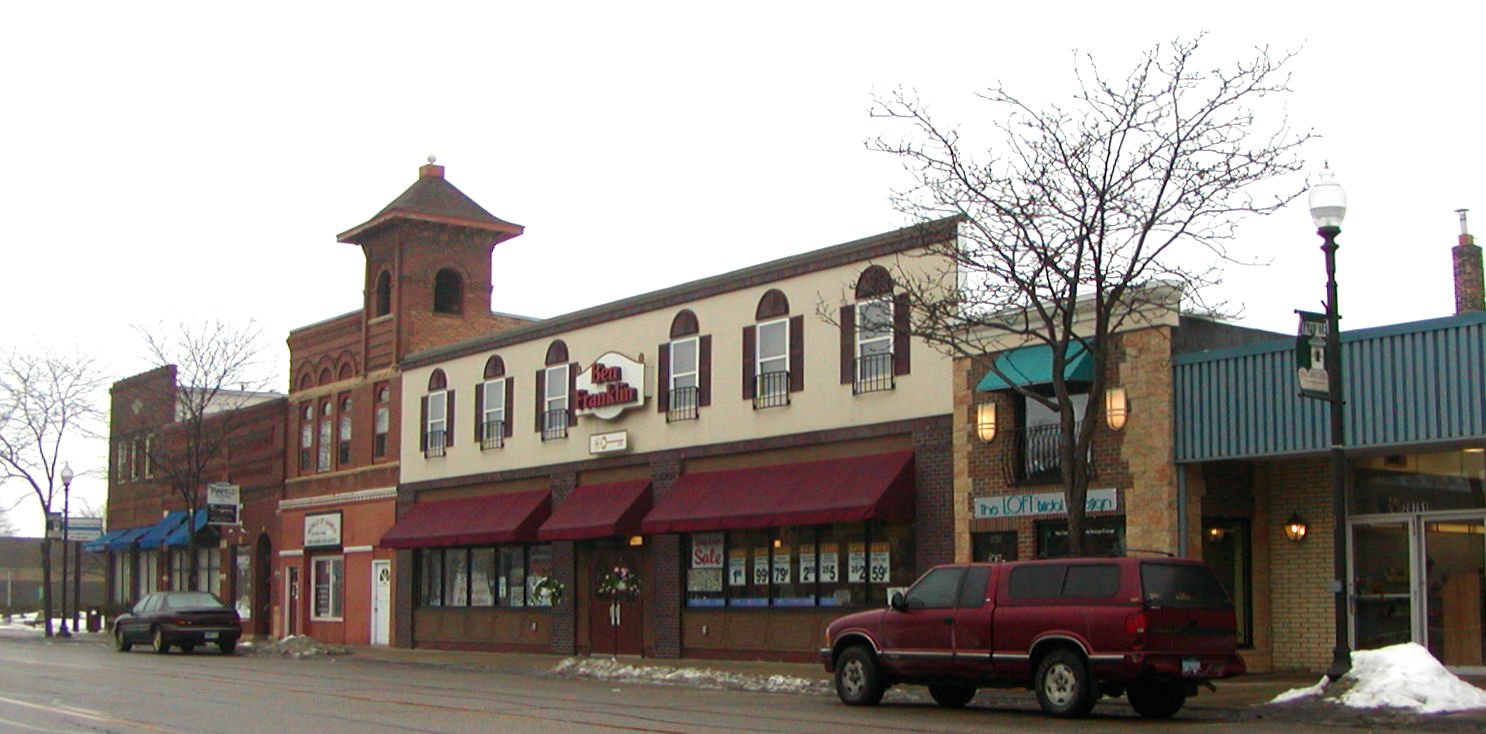
Lakeville's downtown began in the early 20th century, contrasting its modern suburban development.

In contrast, the southern part of Dakota County reflects the rural past with small towns such as Farmington, Coates, Vermillion, Hampton, Randolph, and Miesville where street grids and housing dating from the early 20th century can be found. Much of the county is self-contained except for two examples. The City of Hastings, the county seat, lies on both banks of the Mississippi River and was linked historically and physically by rail to the growing influence of the state's capital, Saint Paul. On the south border, the City of Northfield, technically in Rice County, has expanded north into Dakota however the city itself is allowed into the municipal sewer boundary.

Though all of Dakota County is considered part of the metropolitan area and open to major development, the county government has steadily preserved farmland and continues to acquire new permanent natural lands in the southern townships. This has further defined the boundaries between urbanized and rural which is starkly visible in the outskirts of the developed cities. While the center of population still lies north with more cosmopolitan residents, culturally Dakota County is a rural community and the Dakota County Fair is still a largely agricultural event, held annually in Farmington.

Most of northern Dakota County is referred to as "South of the River" for its location being south of the Minnesota River.

=== Cities (2021 population estimate) ===
- Apple Valley 55,638
- Burnsville 63,943
- Coates 142
- Eagan 68,642
- Empire 2,444
- Farmington 23,534
- Hampton 736
- Hastings (partly in Washington County) 21,925
- Inver Grove Heights 35,541
- Lakeville 72,812
- Lilydale 800
- Mendota 183
- Mendota Heights 11,665
- Miesville 134
- New Trier 83
- Northfield (mostly in Rice County) 20,709
- Randolph 464
- Rosemount 26,642
- South St. Paul 20,536
- Sunfish Lake 523
- Vermillion 439
- West St. Paul 20,822

=== Unincorporated communities ===
- Castle Rock
- Etter
- Eureka Center
- Waterford

=== Ghost towns ===
- Lewiston
- Nininger

=== Townships ===
- Castle Rock Township
- Douglas Township
- Eureka Township
- Greenvale Township
- Hampton Township
- Marshan Township
- Nininger Township
- Randolph Township
- Ravenna Township
- Sciota Township
- Vermillion Township
- Waterford Township

== Infrastructure ==
=== SMART training center ===
Between 2016 and 2017, Dakota County officials began designing a training center for law enforcement. $6.2 million in bonds were approved for the project by the Minnesota Legislature in 2018, along with $6.6 million in bonds from the county. In September 2021, Dakota County opened the 35,000 square foot Safety and Mental Health Alternative Response Training (SMART) center in Inver Grove Heights, along Highway 52. The center serves to train statewide law enforcement officers in crisis response, de-escalation, and other "soft skills", using five training rooms with furniture to simulate real-world situations. The SMART Center also houses the Dakota County Electronic Crimes Unit and the Dakota County Drug Task Force.

Congressperson Angie Craig, as well as other local politicians were present at the project’s ribbon-cutting ceremony.

== Notable people ==
- Pierce Butler, United States Supreme Court justice
- Michael Busch, MLB player with the Chicago Cubs since 2024. Born and raised in Inver Grove Heights
- Ignatius Donnelly, politician
- Steven Engler, politician
- David Knutson, Minnesota State Senator of District 37, 2003-2004
- William Gates LeDuc, pioneer, politician, brevet brigadier general
- Henry Hastings Sibley, first Governor of Minnesota
- Harold Stassen (R), Former Governor of Minnesota, Aide to Adm. Bull Halsey, Aide to President Dwight Eisenhower, Participant/Drafter of the United Nations Charter

== See also ==
- National Register of Historic Places listings in Dakota County, Minnesota
