= Randolph, Minnesota =

City in Minnesota, United States

Randolph
- City
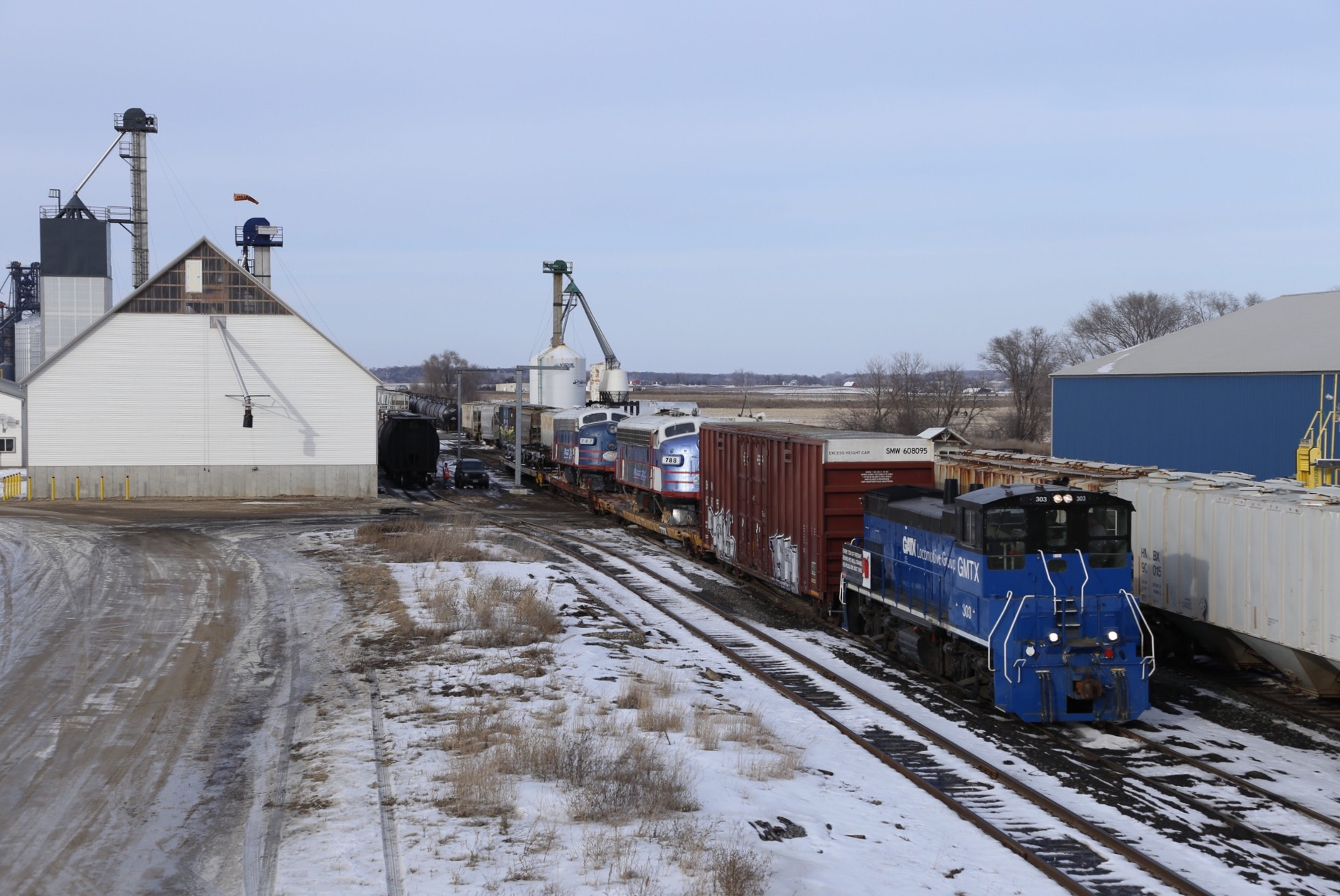
- Rail yard in Randolph

- Location of the city of Randolph within Dakota County, Minnesota
- Coordinates: 44°31′30″N 93°1′10″W
- Country: United States
- State: Minnesota
- County: Dakota

Area
  - Total: 0.98 sq mi (2.54 km^{2})
  - Land: 0.95 sq mi (2.47 km^{2})
  - Water: 0.027 sq mi (0.07 km^{2})
- Elevation: 879 ft (268 m)

Population (2020)
  - Total: 466
  - Density: 489.1/sq mi (188.85/km^{2})
- Time zone: UTC-6 (Central (CST))
  - Summer (DST): UTC-5 (CDT)
- ZIP code: 55065
- Area codes: 507, 651
- FIPS code: 27-53098
- GNIS feature ID: 0649818
- Website: https://www.cityofrandolphmn.com/

Randolph is a city in Dakota County, Minnesota, United States. As of the 2020 census, Randolph had a population of 466.

== History ==
A post office called Randolph has been in operation since 1886. The city took its name from Randolph Township.

== Geography ==
According to the United States Census Bureau, the city has a total area of 1.03 square miles (2.67 km^{2}), of which 0.96 square miles (2.49 km^{2}) is land and 0.07 square miles (0.18 km^{2}) is water.

The city of Randolph is entirely within Randolph Township geographically but is a separate entity.

Lake Byllesby and the Cannon River are both nearby.

Randolph is in the southern part of Dakota County. The boundary line between Dakota, Goodhue, and Rice counties is nearby.

== Demographics ==
Historical population
Census	Pop.	Note	%±
1910	182		—
1920	170		−6.6%
1930	214		25.9%
1940	236		10.3%
1950	259		9.7%
1960	315		21.6%
1970	350		11.1%
1980	351		0.3%
1990	331		−5.7%
2000	318		−3.9%
2010	436		37.1%
2020	466		6.9%
U.S. Decennial Census

=== 2010 census ===
As of the census of 2010, there were 436 people, 168 households, and 118 families living in the city. The population density was 454.2 inhabitants per square mile (175.4/km^{2}). There were 177 housing units at an average density of 184.4 per square mile (71.2/km^{2}). The racial makeup of the city was 98.4% White, 0.2% Asian, and 1.4% from two or more races. Hispanic or Latino of any race were 1.8% of the population.

There were 168 households, of which 37.5% had children under the age of 18 living with them, 53.6% were married couples living together, 11.3% had a female householder with no husband present, 5.4% had a male householder with no wife present, and 29.8% were non-families. 23.2% of all households were made up of individuals, and 7.8% had someone living alone who was 65 years of age or older. The average household size was 2.60 and the average family size was 3.03.

The median age in the city was 36 years. 27.5% of residents were under the age of 18; 7.8% were between the ages of 18 and 24; 27.7% were from 25 to 44; 29.1% were from 45 to 64; and 7.8% were 65 years of age or older. The gender makeup of the city was 51.1% male and 48.9% female.

=== 2000 census ===
As of the census of 2000, there were 318 people, 117 households, and 89 families living in the city. The racial makeup of the city was 98.74% White, 0.63% Asian, and 0.63% from two or more races. Hispanic or Latino of any race were 1.26% of the population.

There were 117 households, out of which 38.5% had children under the age of 18 living with them, 65.0% were married couples living together, 6.0% had a female householder with no husband present, and 23.9% were non-families. 22.2% of all households were made up of individuals, and 4.3% had someone living alone who was 65 years of age or older. The average household size was 2.72 and the average family size was 3.13.

In the city, the population was spread out, with 28.9% under the age of 18, 6.6% from 18 to 24, 33.0% from 25 to 44, 20.4% from 45 to 64, and 11.0% who were 65 years of age or older. The median age was 35 years. For every 100 females, there were 101.3 males. For every 100 females age 18 and over, there were 98.2 males.

The median income for a household in the city was $42,750, and the median income for a family was $48,125. Males had a median income of $35,375 versus $25,000 for females. The per capita income for the city was $16,947. About 3.9% of families and 4.3% of the population were below the poverty line, including none of those under age 18 and 13.5% of those age 65 or over.

== Notable people ==
- Caleb Thielbar, MLB pitcher with the Minnesota Twins and Chicago Cubs

== Transportation ==
=== Roads ===
State Highway 56, County Road 88 / 292nd Street East, and County Road 83 are main routes in the community.

Nearby routes include U.S. Highway 52, State Highway 19, County Road 47 / Northfield Boulevard, and County Road 86.

=== Airport ===
Stanton Airfield is located five miles south of Randolph but is primarily a general aviation airport.
