= Lake Vermilion (disambiguation) =

Lake Vermilion or Vermilion Lake may refer to:

- Canada
  - Vermilion Lakes, a series of lakes in Alberta, Canada
  - Vermilion Lake (Sudbury), a lake near Sudbury, Canada
  - Vermilion Lake (Temagami), a lake near Temagami, Canada
- United States
  - Lake Vermilion (Illinois), a reservoir in Illinois county, United States
  - Lake Vermilion, a lake in St. Louis County, Minnesota
  - Vermilion Lake Township, St. Louis County, Minnesota

== See also ==
- Lake Vermillion (disambiguation)
- Vermilion (disambiguation)
