= Lake Vermillion (disambiguation) =

Lake Vermillion or Vermillion Lake may refer to:

- Minnesota
  - Lake Vermilion, a lake in St. Louis County
  - Lake Vermilion State Park, a Minnesota state park, based around the lake of the same name
- South Dakota
  - Lake Vermillion, a lake in McCook County

== See also ==
Lake Vermilion (disambiguation)
