= Vermillion River =

Vermillion River or Vermilion River or Vermillon River may refer to the following rivers:

== Canada ==
- Vermilion River (Alberta)
- Vermilion River (British Columbia)
- Vermillon River (La Tuque), Quebec
- Vermillon River (Chigoubiche River tributary), Quebec
- Vermilion River (Lac Seul), Ontario
- Vermilion River (Sudbury District), Ontario

== United States ==
- Vermilion River (Wabash River tributary), in Illinois and Indiana
  - Middle Fork Vermilion River
- Vermilion River (Illinois River tributary), in Illinois
- Vermilion River (Louisiana)
- Vermilion River (Minnesota), in northern Minnesota
- Vermillion River (Minnesota), in southern Minnesota
- Vermilion River (Ohio)
- Vermillion River (South Dakota)

== See also ==
- County of Vermilion River, in Alberta, Canada
- Vermilion (disambiguation)
- Little Vermilion River (disambiguation)
- Vermillion Creek, a tributary of the Green River in Colorado, U.S.
- Vermillion River Formation, a geological formation in Manitoba, Canada
