= Vermillion, Minnesota =

City in Minnesota, United States

Vermillion
- City
- Location of the city of Vermillion within Dakota County, Minnesota
- Coordinates: 44°40′28″N 92°58′6″W
- Country: United States
- State: Minnesota
- County: Dakota

Area
  - Total: 0.99 sq mi (2.57 km^{2})
  - Land: 0.98 sq mi (2.55 km^{2})
  - Water: 0.0077 sq mi (0.02 km^{2})
- Elevation: 843 ft (257 m)

Population (2020)
  - Total: 441
  - Density: 447.7/sq mi (172.85/km^{2})
- Time zone: UTC-6 (Central (CST))
  - Summer (DST): UTC-5 (CDT)
- ZIP code: 55085
- Area code: 651
- FIPS code: 27-66802
- GNIS feature ID: 0653633

Vermillion is a city in Dakota County, Minnesota, United States. The population was 441 at the 2020 census.

== Geography ==
According to the United States Census Bureau, the city has a total area of 0.97 square miles (2.51 km^{2}), of which 0.96 square miles (2.49 km^{2}) is land and 0.01 square miles (0.03 km^{2}) is water.

The main routes include Main Street (190th Street East / County 62), Fischer Avenue (County 66), and Goodwin Avenue (County 85).

U.S. Highway 52 and Northfield Boulevard (County 47) are both nearby.

The Vermillion River flows through the community. Nearby places include Hampton, New Trier, Hastings, Rosemount, Coates, Farmington, and Northfield.

Vermillion is located entirely within Vermillion Township geographically but is a separate entity.

== Demographics ==
Historical population
Census	Pop.	Note	%±
1900	100		—
1910	161		61.0%
1920	99		−38.5%
1930	114		15.2%
1940	107		−6.1%
1950	112		4.7%
1960	248		121.4%
1970	359		44.8%
1980	438		22.0%
1990	510		16.4%
2000	437		−14.3%
2010	419		−4.1%
2020	441		5.3%
U.S. Decennial Census

=== 2010 census ===
As of the census of 2010, there were 419 people, 156 households, and 121 families living in the city. The population density was 436.5 inhabitants per square mile (168.5/km^{2}). There were 162 housing units at an average density of 168.8 per square mile (65.2/km^{2}). The racial makeup of the city was 96.4% White, 0.2% African American, 1.4% Asian, and 1.9% from two or more races. Hispanic or Latino of any race were 0.2% of the population.

There were 156 households, of which 32.7% had children under the age of 18 living with them, 67.3% were married couples living together, 5.8% had a female householder with no husband present, 4.5% had a male householder with no wife present, and 22.4% were non-families. 18.6% of all households were made up of individuals, and 10.3% had someone living alone who was 65 years of age or older. The average household size was 2.67 and the average family size was 3.03.

The median age in the city was 40.6 years. 22.2% of residents were under the age of 18; 8.1% were between the ages of 18 and 24; 26.3% were from 25 to 44; 31.8% were from 45 to 64; and 11.7% were 65 years of age or older. The gender makeup of the city was 52.5% male and 47.5% female.

=== 2000 census ===
As of the census of 2000, there were 437 people, 150 households, and 118 families living in the city. The population density was 438.6 inhabitants per square mile (169.3/km^{2}). There were 161 housing units at an average density of 161.6 per square mile (62.4/km^{2}). The racial makeup of the city was 97.03% White, 0.46% African American, 0.23% Pacific Islander, 1.37% from other races, and 0.92% from two or more races. Hispanic or Latino of any race were 2.06% of the population.

There were 160 households, out of which 38.8% had children under the age of 18 living with them, 68.1% were married couples living together, 4.4% had a female householder with no husband present, and 26.3% were non-families. 20.6% of all households were made up of individuals, and 9.4% had someone living alone who was 65 years of age or older. The average household size was 2.73 and the average family size was 3.19.

In the city, the population was spread out, with 25.4% under the age of 18, 9.6% from 18 to 24, 31.6% from 25 to 44, 21.3% from 45 to 64, and 12.1% who were 65 years of age or older. The median age was 36 years. For every 100 females, there were 104.2 males. For every 100 females age 18 and over, there were 98.8 males.

The median income for a household in the city was $61,667, and the median income for a family was $68,036. Males had a median income of $40,521 versus $30,417 for females. The per capita income for the city was $22,552. None of the families and 0.9% of the population were living below the poverty line, including no under eighteens and 7.9% of those over 64.
