= Greenvale Township, Dakota County, Minnesota =

Township in Minnesota, United States

Greenvale Township
- Township
- Location within the state of Minnesota Greenvale Township (the United States)
- Coordinates: 44°30′49″N 93°12′58″W
- Country: United States
- State: Minnesota
- County: Dakota

Area
  - Total: 29.7 sq mi (77.0 km^{2})
  - Land: 29.7 sq mi (77.0 km^{2})
  - Water: 0 sq mi (0.0 km^{2})
- Elevation: 965 ft (294 m)

Population (2020)
  - Total: 796
  - Density: 27/sq mi (10.3/km^{2})
- Time zone: UTC-6 (Central (CST))
  - Summer (DST): UTC-5 (CDT)
- ZIP code: 55057
- Area codes: 507, portions in 952
- FIPS code: 27-25802
- GNIS feature ID: 0664346
- Website: https://www.greenvaletwp.org/

Greenvale Township is a township in Dakota County, Minnesota, United States. The population was 796 at the 2020 census.

Greenvale Township was organized in 1858.

== Geography ==
According to the United States Census Bureau, the township has a total area of 29.7 square miles (77 km^{2}), of which 29.7 square miles (77 km^{2}) is land and 0.03% is water.

== Demographics ==
Historical population
| Census | Pop. | Note | %± |
|---|---|---|---|
| 1860 | 302 | | — |
| 1870 | 725 | | 140.1% |
| 1880 | 836 | | 15.3% |
| 1890 | 705 | | −15.7% |
| 1900 | 746 | | 5.8% |
| 1910 | 591 | | −20.8% |
| 1920 | 620 | | 4.9% |
| 1930 | 652 | | 5.2% |
| 1940 | 651 | | −0.2% |
| 1950 | 637 | | −2.2% |
| 1960 | 594 | | −6.8% |
| 1970 | 624 | | 5.1% |
| 1980 | 641 | | 2.7% |
| 1990 | 685 | | 6.9% |
| 2000 | 684 | | −0.1% |
| 2010 | 803 | | 17.4% |
| 2020 | 796 | | −0.9% |
U.S. Decennial Census

As of the census of 2000, there were 684 people, 227 households, and 185 families residing in the township. The population density was 23.0 inhabitants per square mile (8.9/km^{2}). There were 232 housing units at an average density of 7.8 per square mile (3.0/km^{2}). The racial makeup of the township was 98.25% White, 0.29% African American, 0.58% Native American, 0.58% Asian, and 0.29% from two or more races. Hispanic or Latino of any race were 0.29% of the population.

There were 227 households, out of which 44.1% had children under the age of 18 living with them, 74.0% were married couples living together, 5.3% had a female householder with no husband present, and 18.1% were non-families. 13.7% of all households were made up of individuals, and 4.8% had someone living alone who was 65 years of age or older. The average household size was 3.01 and the average family size was 3.35.

In the township the population was spread out, with 30.4% under the age of 18, 7.2% from 18 to 24, 28.7% from 25 to 44, 26.0% from 45 to 64, and 7.7% who were 65 years of age or older. The median age was 36 years. For every 100 females, there were 110.5 males. For every 100 females age 18 and over, there were 107.0 males.

The median income for a household in the township was $66,818, and the median income for a family was $72,500. Males had a median income of $42,381 versus $28,594 for females. The per capita income for the township was $23,398. About 2.1% of families and 2.9% of the population were below the poverty line, including 2.4% of those under age 18 and 14.7% of those age 65 or over.
