= 74th Ohio Infantry Regiment =

Infantry regiment in the Union Army during the American Civil War

- Active: October 5, 1861, to July 11, 1865
- Country: United States
- Allegiance: Union
- Branch: Infantry
- Engagements: Battle of Stones River; Tullahoma Campaign; Battle of Chickamauga; Siege of Chattanooga; Battle of Missionary Ridge; Atlanta campaign; Battle of Rocky Face Ridge; Battle of Resaca; Battle of Kennesaw Mountain; Battle of Peachtree Creek; Siege of Atlanta; Battle of Jonesboro; Sherman's March to the Sea; Carolinas campaign; Battle of Bentonville

The 74th Ohio Infantry Regiment, sometimes 74th Ohio Volunteer Infantry (or 74th OVI) was an infantry regiment in the Union Army during the American Civil War.

== Service ==
The 74th Ohio Infantry was organized in Xenia, Ohio, beginning October 5, 1861. It was mustered in for three years service on March 27, 1862, under the command of Colonel Granville Moody.

The regiment was attached to Dumont's Independent Brigade, Army of the Ohio, to June 1862. Unattached, Army of the Ohio, to September 1862. 7th Brigade, 8th Division, Army of the Ohio, to November 1862. 3rd Brigade, 2nd Division, Center, XIV Corps, Army of the Cumberland, to January 1863. 3rd Brigade, 2nd Division, XIV Corps, Army of the Cumberland, to October 1863. 3rd Brigade, 1st Division, XIV Corps, to June 1865. 2nd Brigade, 1st Division, XIV Corps, to July 1865.

The 74th Ohio Infantry mustered out of service at Louisville, Kentucky, on July 11, 1865.

== Detailed service ==
Ordered to Camp Chase, Ohio, February 24, 1862, and duty there until April 20. Moved to Nashville, Tenn., April 20–24. Dumont's Expedition over the Cumberland Mountains, Tenn., June 1862. Guard duty along railroad between Nashville and Columbia, Tenn., until September 3. Siege of Nashville September 12-November 7. Fort Riley near Nashville October 5. Gallatin Pike near Nashville October 20. Duty at Nashville until December 26. Advance on Murfreesboro December 26–30. Battle of Stones River December 30–31, 1862 and January 1–3, 1863. Duty at Murfreesboro until June. Tullahoma Campaign June 23-July 7. Occupation of middle Tennessee until August 16. Passage of the Cumberland Mountains and Tennessee River and Chickamauga Campaign August 16-September 22. Davis Cross Roads or Dug Gap September 11. Battle of Chickamauga September 19–21. Rossville Gap September 21. Siege of Chattanooga, Tenn., September 24-November 23. Chattanooga-Ringgold Campaign November 23–27. Orchard Knob November 23–24. Missionary Ridge November 25. Regiment reenlisted January 1, 1864. Veterans on furlough January 25-April 12. Atlanta Campaign May 1-September 8. Demonstration on Rocky Faced Ridge May 8–11. Buzzard's Roost Gap May 8–9. Battle of Resaca May 14–15. Mill Springs Gap May 19. Operations on line of Pumpkin Vine Creek and battles about Dallas, New Hope Church and Allatoona Hills May 25-June 5. Pickett's Mills May 27. Operations about Marietta and against Kennesaw Mountain June 10-July 2. Pine Hill June 11–14. Lost Mountain June 15–17. Assault on Kennesaw June 27. Ruff's Station July 4. Chattahoochie River July 5–17. Peachtree Creek July 19–20. Siege of Atlanta July 22-August 25. Utoy Creek August 5–7. Flank movement on Jonesboro August 25–30. Battle of Jonesboro August 31-September 1. Operations against Hood in northern Georgia and northern Alabama September 29-November 3. March to the sea November 15-December 10. Siege of Savannah December 10–21. Campaign of the Carolinas January to April 1865. Taylor's Hole Creek, Averysboro, N. C., March 16. Battle of Bentonville March 19–21. Occupation of Goldsboro March 24. Advance on Raleigh April 10–14. Occupation of Raleigh April 14. Bennett's House April 26. Surrender of Johnston and his army. March to Washington, D.C., via Richmond, Va., April 29-May 20. Grand Review of the Armies May 24. Moved to Louisville, Ky., June, and duty there until July.

== Casualties ==
The regiment lost a total of 164 men during service; 2 officers and 51 enlisted men killed or mortally wounded, 2 officers and 105 enlisted men died of disease.

== Commanders ==
- Colonel Granville Moody - resigned May 16, 1863
- Colonel Josiah Given - resigned September 29, 1864
- Lieutenant Colonel Robert P. Findley - mustered out with regiment, July 10, 1865
- Captain Joseph Fisher - commanded at Battle of Chickamauga

== See also ==
- List of Ohio Civil War units
- Ohio in the Civil War
