= Earley Lake =

Lake in the state of Minnesota, United States

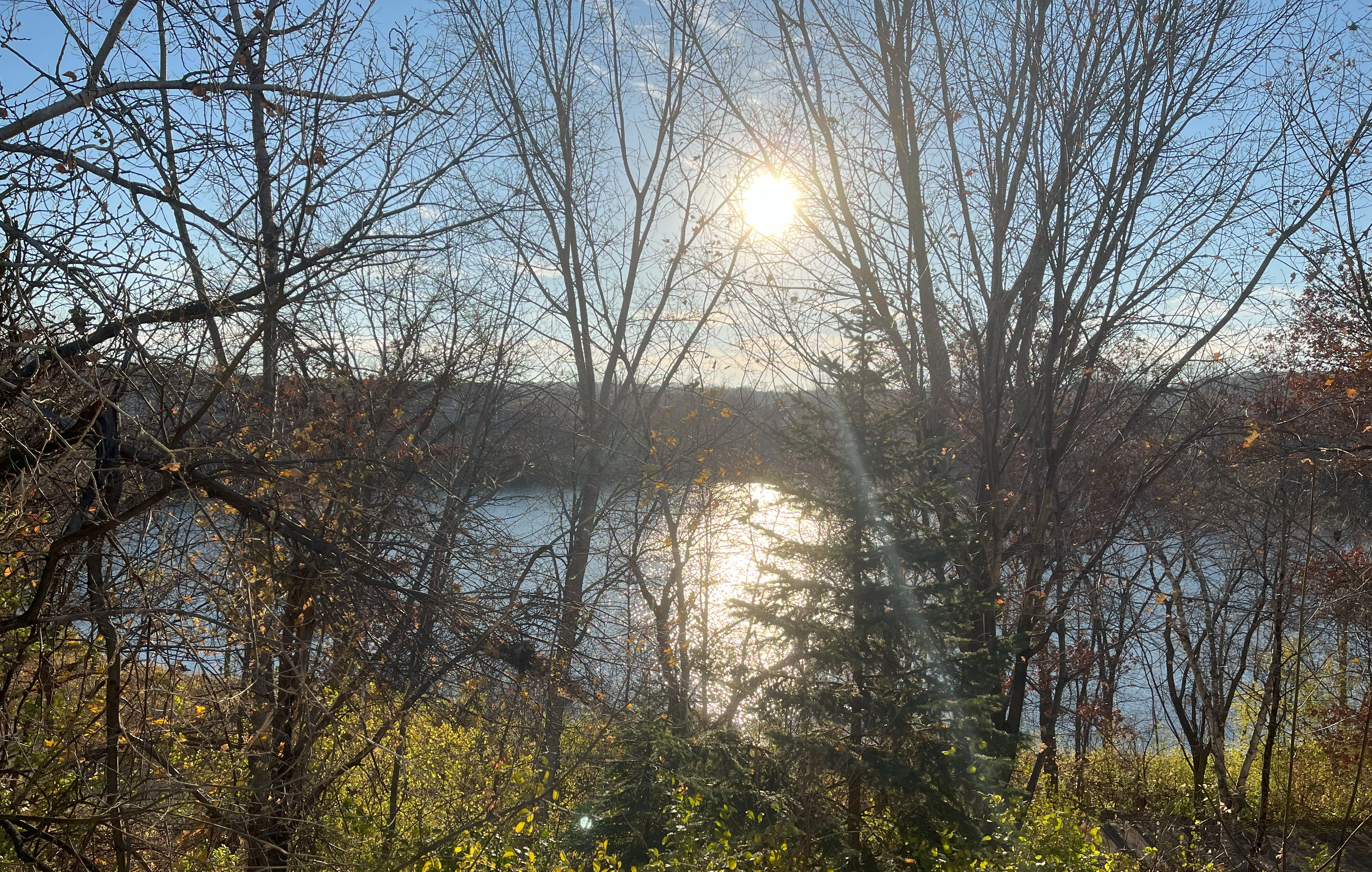

- Location within Minnesota
- Location: Dakota County, Minnesota
- Coordinates: 44°44′22″N 93°17′43″W
- Type: lake

Earley Lake is a 23-acre lake in Dakota County, in the U.S. state of Minnesota.

Earley Lake was named for William Earley, a pioneer who settled there in 1854.

Day Park and Earley Lake Trail are a four-acre park located on the northeast corner of County Road 5 and Southcross Drive. A hard surface 1.2 mile walking path surrounds the lake allowing for a handful of recreation opportunities.

Friends of Earley Lake is a non-profit organization dedicated to the conservation and enjoyment of Earley Lake and its surrounding natural habitat.

== See also ==
- List of lakes in Minnesota
