= Marshan Township, Dakota County, Minnesota =

Township in Minnesota, United States

Marshan Township
- Township
- Location within the state of Minnesota Marshan Township (the United States)
- Coordinates: 44°41′N 92°52′W
- Country: United States
- State: Minnesota
- County: Dakota

Area
  - Total: 34.5 sq mi (89.4 km^{2})
  - Land: 34.5 sq mi (89.4 km^{2})
  - Water: 0 sq mi (0.0 km^{2})
- Elevation: 823 ft (251 m)

Population (2020)
  - Total: 1,153
  - Density: 33/sq mi (12.9/km^{2})
- Time zone: UTC-6 (Central (CST))
  - Summer (DST): UTC-5 (CDT)
- FIPS code: 27-40724
- GNIS feature ID: 0664919
- Website: https://marshantownship.com/

Marshan Township is a township in Dakota County, Minnesota, United States. The population was 1,153 at the 2020 census.

== Geography ==
According to the United States Census Bureau, the township has a total area of 34.5 square miles (89.4 km^{2}), all land.

== History ==
Marshan Township was organized in 1858, and named for the settlers Michael Marsh and his wife Ann. Hastings has annexed portions of the northern part of the township.

== Demographics ==
Historical population
Census	Pop.	Note	%±
1860	275		—
1870	527		91.6%
1880	563		6.8%
1890	499		−11.4%
1900	494		−1.0%
1910	469		−5.1%
1920	495		5.5%
1930	477		−3.6%
1940	451		−5.5%
1950	406		−10.0%
1960	692		70.4%
1970	1,186		71.4%
1980	1,655		39.5%
1990	1,215		−26.6%
2000	1,263		4.0%
2010	1,106		−12.4%
2020	1,153		4.2%
U.S. Decennial Census

As of the census of 2000, there were 1,263 people, 404 households, and 347 families residing in the township. The population density was 36.6 inhabitants per square mile (14.1/km^{2}). There were 409 housing units at an average density of 11.9/sq mi (4.6/km^{2}). The racial makeup of the township was 99.13% White, 0.24% African American, 0.08% Native American, 0.08% from other races, and 0.48% from two or more races. Hispanic or Latino of any race were 0.87% of the population.

There were 404 households, out of which 44.3% had children under the age of 18 living with them, 75.7% were married couples living together, 5.0% had a female householder with no husband present, and 14.1% were non-families. 9.9% of all households were made up of individuals, and 1.7% had someone living alone who was 65 years of age or older. The average household size was 3.11 and the average family size was 3.27.

In the township, the population was spread out, with 29.9% under the age of 18, 7.5% from 18 to 24, 29.8% from 25 to 44, 25.4% from 45 to 64, and 7.4% who were 65 years of age or older. The median age was 36 years. For every 100 females, there were 105.0 males. For every 100 females age 18 and over, there were 107.3 males.

The median income for a household in the township was $62,171, and the median income for a family was $65,278. Males had a median income of $43,580 versus $30,455 for females. The per capita income for the township was $26,278. About 5.0% of families and 6.6% of the population were below the poverty line, including 9.5% of those under age 18 and none of those age 65 or over.
