= Silas M. Weaver =

American judge (1843–1923)

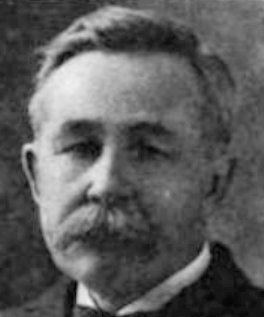

Justice of the Iowa Supreme Court
- In office January 1, 1902 – November 6, 1923

Member of the Iowa House of Representatives
- In office 1884–1886

Personal details
- Born: Silas Matteson Weaver; December 18, 1843 Arkwright, New York
- Died: November 6, 1923 (aged 79)
- Party: Republican
- Education: Fredonia Academy
- Occupation: Newspaper editor, judge, politician

Silas Matteson Weaver (December 18, 1843 – November 6, 1923) was a justice of the Iowa Supreme Court from January 1, 1902, to November 6, 1923, appointed from Hardin County, Iowa.

== Biography ==
Silas M. Weaver was born in Arkwright, New York, on December 18, 1843. He attended Fredonia Academy, read law, and was admitted to the bar in Buffalo on May 4, 1868. The same year, he moved to Iowa Falls, Iowa. There, he practiced law and edited newspapers such as the Sentinel and Hardin County Citizen He also served as the city's mayor for two years.

A Republican, he was a member of the Iowa House of Representatives from 1884 to 1886. He was elected to the state Supreme Court in 1902, and remained on the bench until his death. He was chief justice in 1907 and 1913.

Weaver died at his home in Iowa Falls on November 6, 1923.

Political offices
| Preceded by Josiah Given | Justice of the Iowa Supreme Court; 1902–1923 | Succeeded by Charles W. Vermillion |
