= Lebanon Hills Regional Park =

Public park in Dakota County, Minnesota, United States

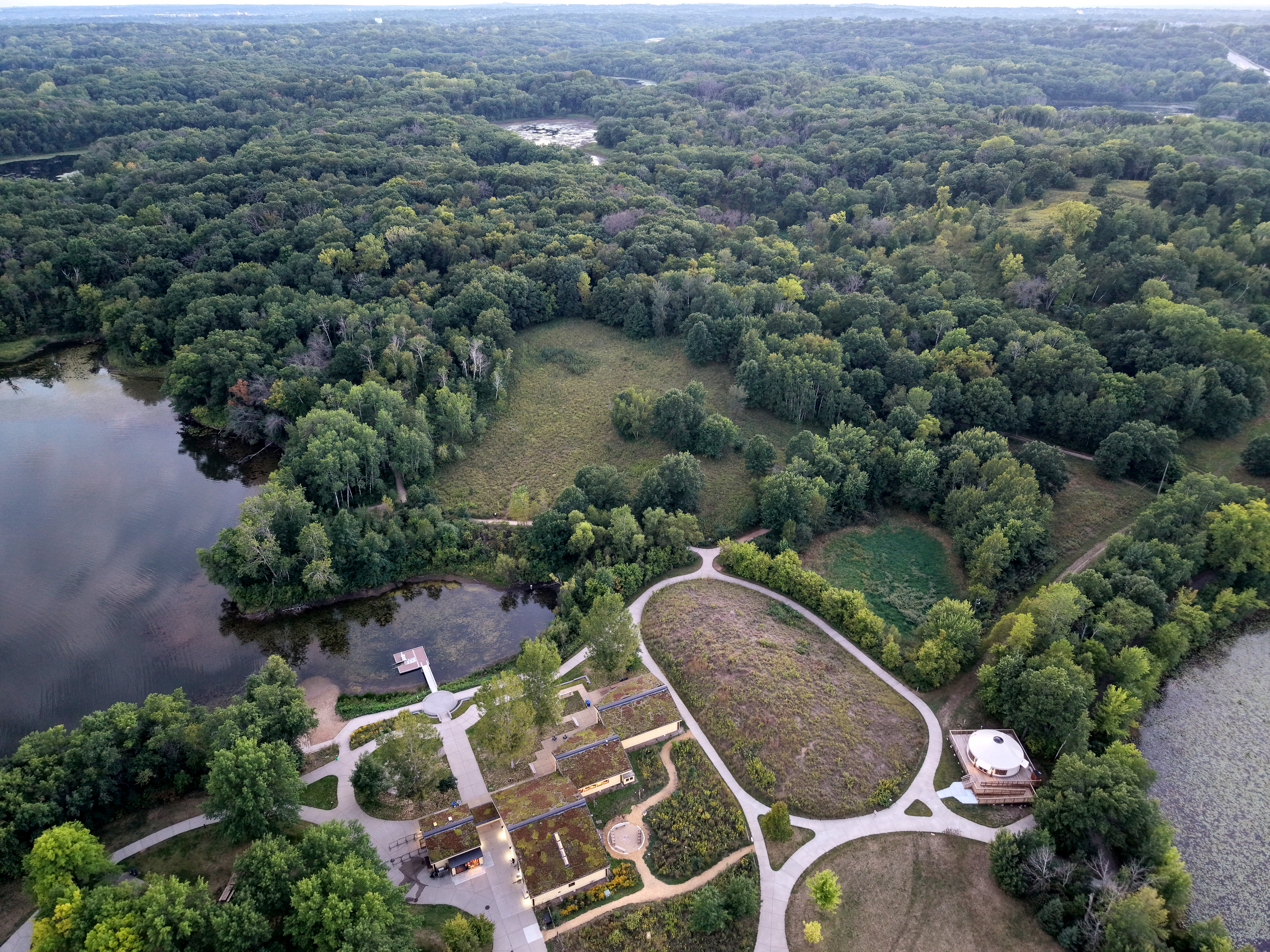
- Visitor center & view of park

- Location within Minnesota Location within the United States
- Location: Dakota, Minnesota, United States
- Coordinates: 44°46′37.9″N 93°10′00.8″W
- Area: 1,869 acres (7.56 km^{2})
- Elevation: 958 ft (292 m)
- Established: 1967
- Governing body: Dakota County Parks

Lebanon Hills Regional Park is a park in Eagan and Apple Valley, Minnesota. The 1,869-acre (7.56 km^{2}) park, the largest in Dakota County, contains forests, grasslands, marshes, and wetlands. Winter activities include skiing, snowshoeing, ice skating, ice fishing, hiking, and winter mountain biking. Summer activities include mountain biking, canoeing, kayaking, swimming, camping, horseback riding, and hiking.

== Park history and information ==
The park began in 1967 with the acquisition of 80 acres (0.32 km^{2}) around one of its largest lakes, Jensen Lake. Forty additional land acquisitions brought the park up to 1,869 acres (7.56 km^{2}) by 2015. The park includes 13 lakes and ponds. Trails in the park allow hiking, biking, skating, skiing, and horseback riding. There is also a campground and a retreat center, Camp Sacajawea.

== Park trailheads ==
The visitor center trailhead is the park's main trailhead and gateway. It has canoe, kayak and paddleboard rentals in the summer, cross-country ski, snowshoe and kicksled rentals in the winter, park naturalist programs, recreational programs, and picnic areas with charcoal grills. Next to the visitor center is Schulze Lake Beach, with swimming and changing/shower facilities. Special events at the visitor center include a family-friendly New Year's Eve party and the Trails by Candlelight event (second Saturday in February).

The equestrian trailhead has horse trailer parking and more than 10 miles of wooded trails. The Holland Lake trailhead has a pier for fishing, a picnic shelter, and trails that connect to the rest of the park trail system. The Jensen Lake trailhead has multiple picnicking areas, a large picnic shelter, a playground, and a 2-mile (3.2 km) hiking loop around the lake.

Overall, the park has more than 14 miles of summer hiking trails and 12 miles of winter trails.

=== West trailhead/mountain bike trails ===
The first trails in the mountain bike trail system were built by an alliance of Dakota County and Minnesota Off-Road Cyclists (MORC). After the success of the original trails, the system was expanded to include nearly 12 miles of beginner, intermediate, expert and double-expert trails. The trails, which MORC grooms and maintains, are mainly hard-pack singletrack and have many obstacles, including roots, rock gardens, log piles, berms, bridges and jumps. A paved parking lot, changing rooms, bathrooms, picnic area, and a mountain bike skills park were added in 2012.

== Paved pathways controversy ==
In 2013, the park released a draft master plan that included a 6.5 miles (10.5 km) paved trail for walking, biking, and skating that would connect separate regions of the park. According to county officials, the trail would be ADA-compliant, allowing use by all ages and abilities. Several groups, including two chapters of Audubon Minnesota, objected to the plan, stating that a paved path would destroy the park's natural beauty and wilderness feel. The plan was modified to decrease the path's width and move it to the park's perimeter for most of its length. Despite continued opposition, the Dakota County Board of Commissioners voted 5-to-2 to approve the modified plan. As of 2018, there are paved trails only around McDonough and Schulze Lakes on the park's east side, near the visitor center trailhead.

== Emerald ash borer ==
In 2014, the emerald ash borer was discovered in the park. The beetle was found during a routine visual survey and confirmed by an entomologist from the Minnesota Department of Agriculture. Before this, forestry staff had been trying to reduce the likelihood of infestation in the park by treating some ash trees with pesticide and removing others. The park is now under a state and federal quarantine to help prevent further spread of the pest.

== Natural gas pipeline ==
In 2016, approval was given for a natural gas pipeline to cross the park in a wetland area. The pipeline, which is a project of Northern Natural Gas, will follow an easement already in place. The project has caused some concern because the pipeline's installation will disrupt an area of high ecological diversity. According to the Dakota County Soil and Water Conservation District, the pipeline is unlikely to disrupt the wetland in the long term, and the plan will proceed pending approval from the Federal Energy Regulatory Commission.

== Gallery ==
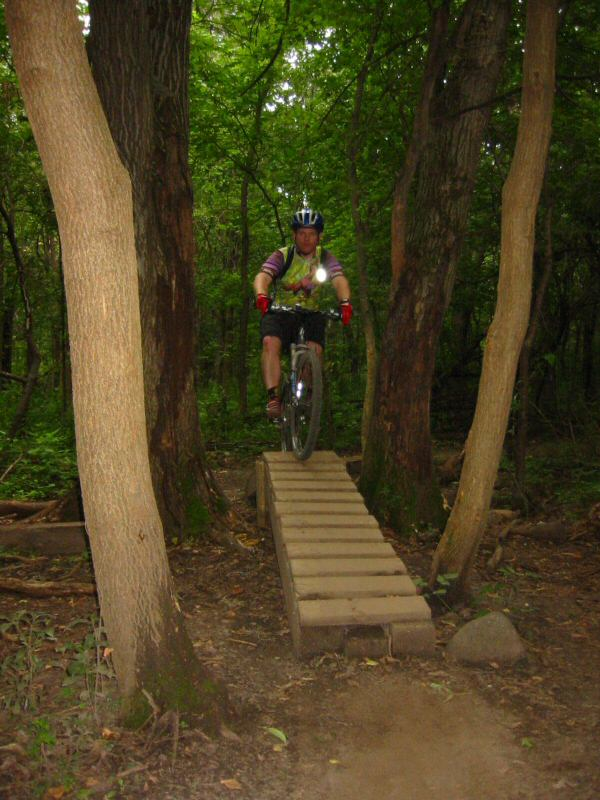
One of the narrow wooden bridges on the advanced loop of the mountain bike trail

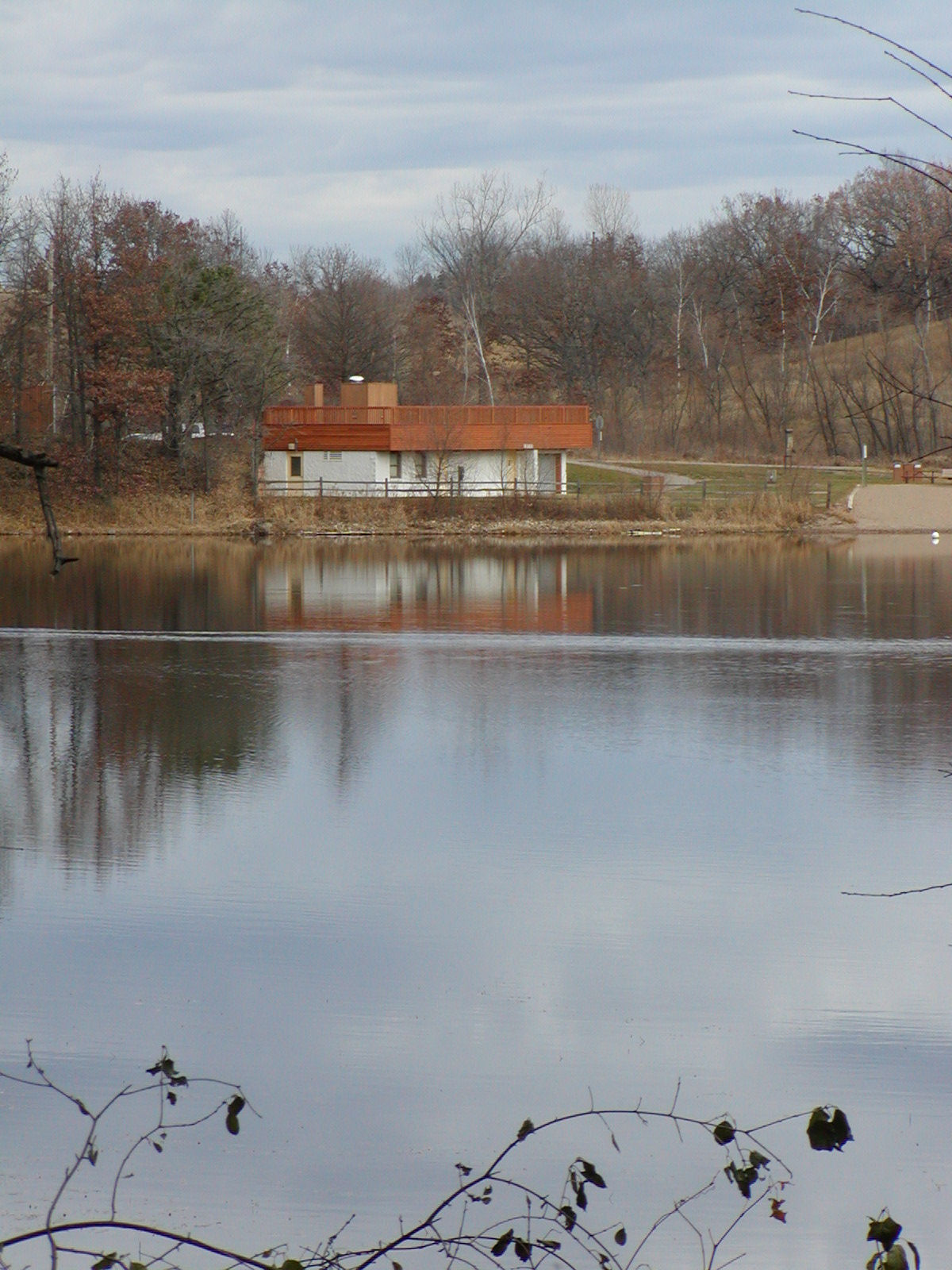
Schulze Lake

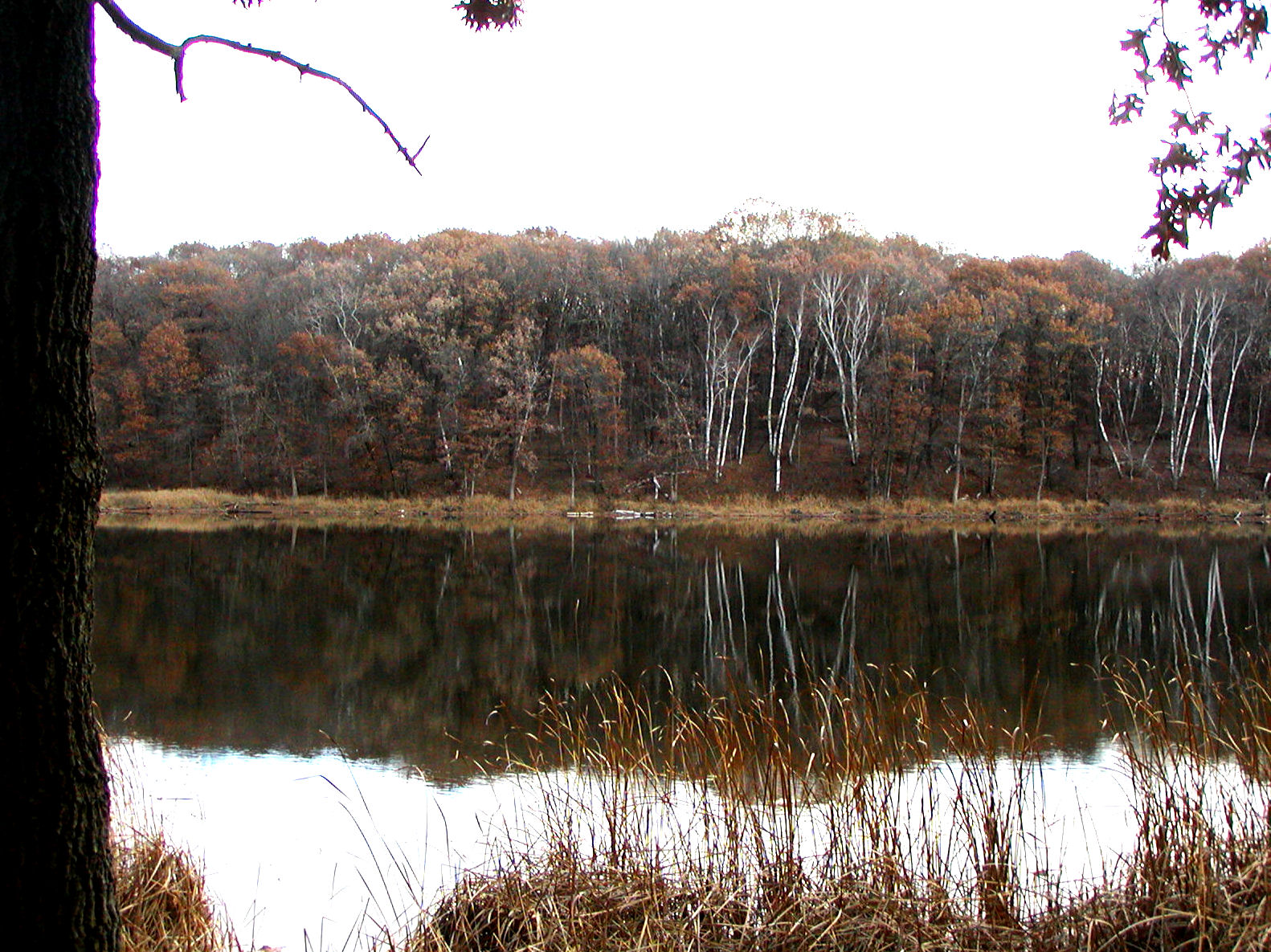
Portage Lake in early November

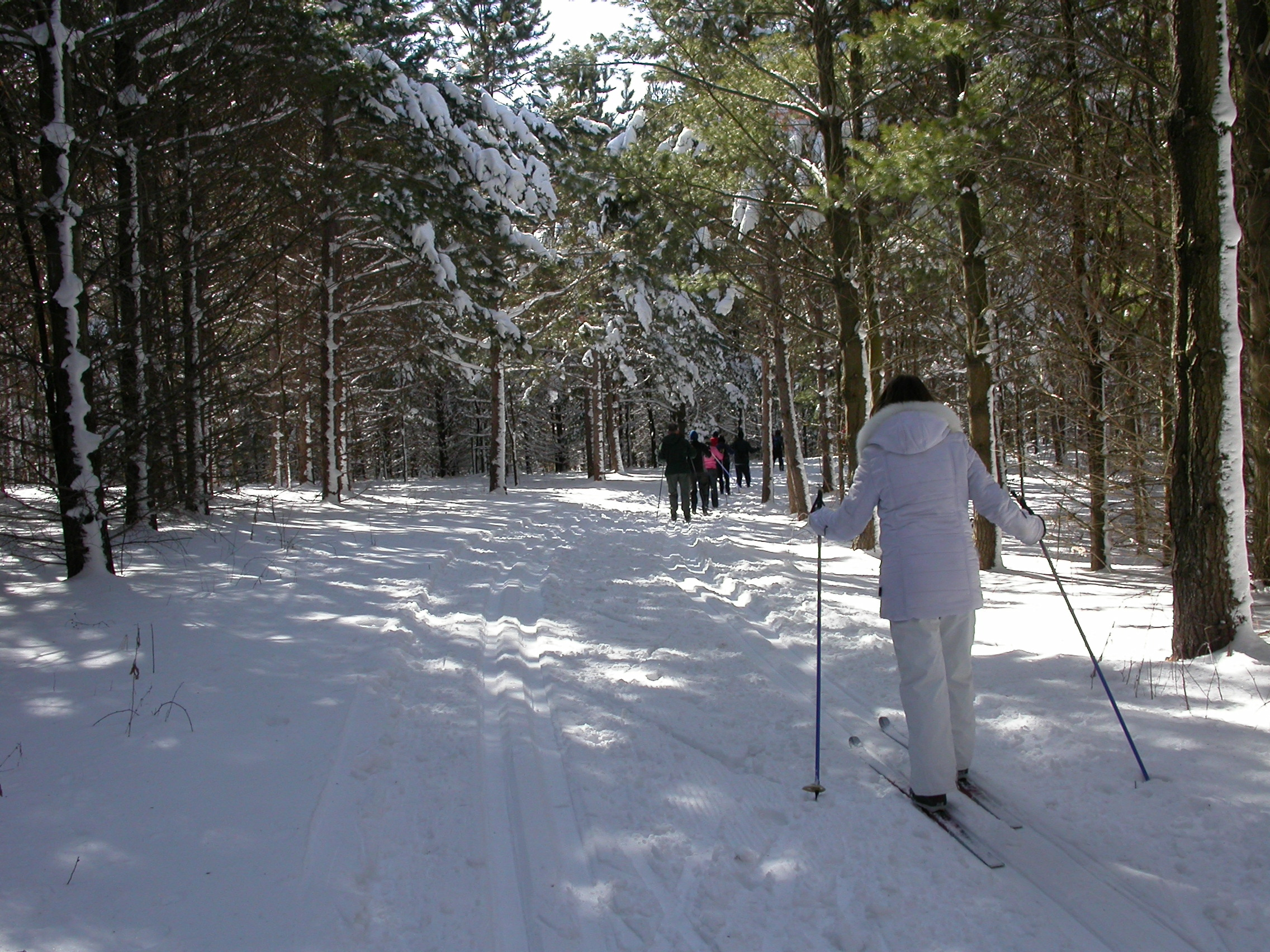
Cross country ski trails

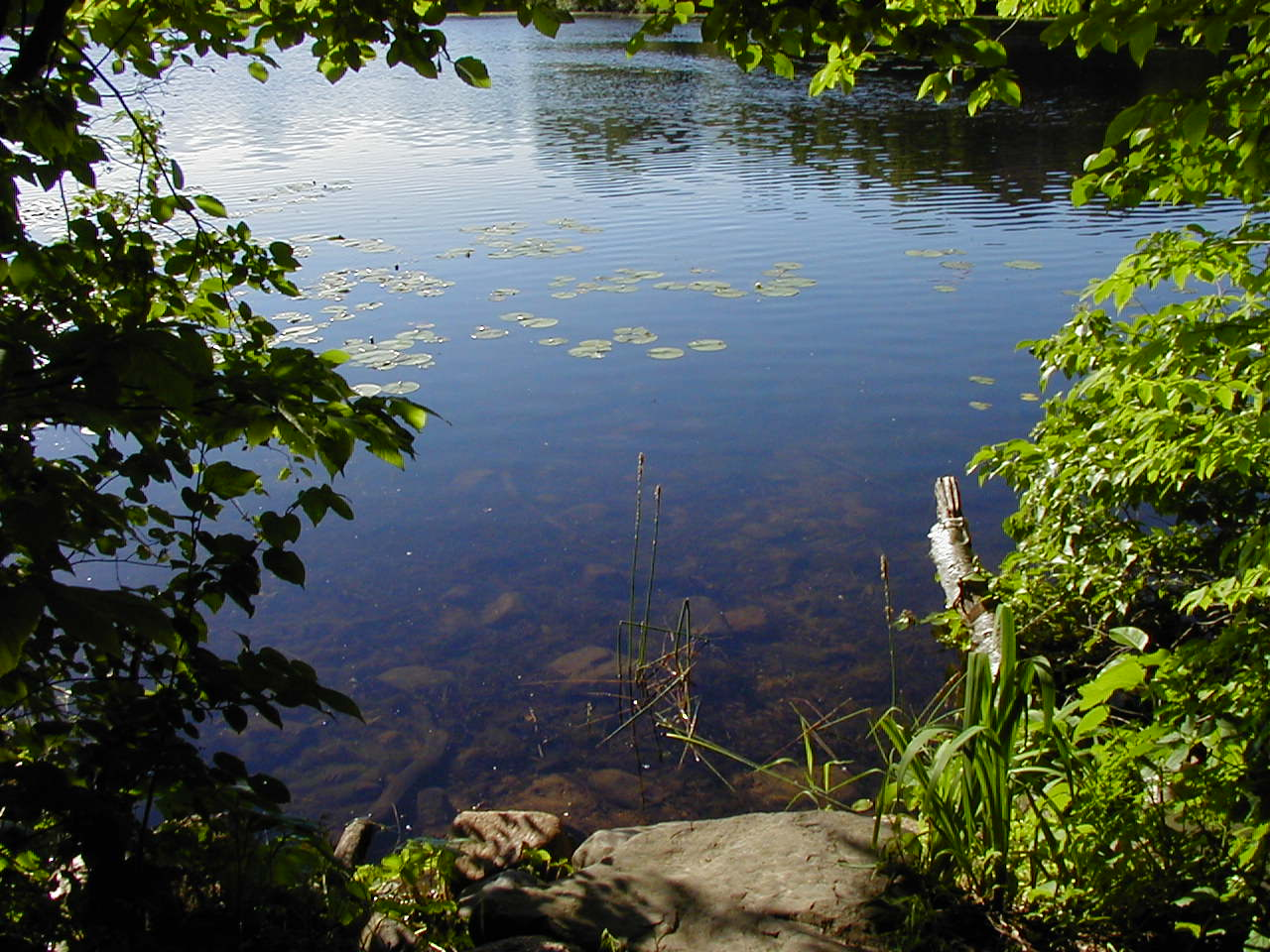
View from the trail around Jensen Lake
