= Alimagnet Lake =

Lake in the state of Minnesota, United States

- Location in Minnesota
- Location: Dakota County, Minnesota
- Coordinates: 44°44′55″N 93°14′58″W
- Type: lake

Alimagnet Lake is a lake in Dakota County, in the U.S. state of Minnesota. The lake stands at the border of Apple Valley and Burnsville within the Minneapolis–Saint Paul metropolitan area. The name Alimagnet is supposedly a portmanteau derived from the first names of Alice McQuillen, Margaret "Maggie" Davis, and Nettie Judd, three young girls who were playing near the yet unnamed lake in the 1860s when surveyors asked their names and subsequently named the lake after them.

== Alimagnet Park ==
The surrounding forestland is a public park. The lake is a popular fishing spot.

== See also ==
- List of lakes in Minnesota
