= Stanton Township, Goodhue County, Minnesota =

Stanton Township, Minnesota
- Township
- Location within the state of Minnesota Stanton Township, Minnesota (the United States)
- Coordinates: 44°29′1″N 92°58′9″W
- Country: United States
- State: Minnesota
- County: Goodhue

Area
  - Total: 23.9 sq mi (61.8 km^{2})
  - Land: 22.7 sq mi (58.9 km^{2})
  - Water: 1.1 sq mi (2.9 km^{2})
- Elevation: 902 ft (275 m)

Population (2010)
  - Total: 1,130
- Time zone: UTC-6 (Central (CST))
  - Summer (DST): UTC-5 (CDT)
- ZIP code: 55018
- Area code: 507
- FIPS code: 27-62428
- GNIS feature ID: 0665695
- FIPS code: 27-62428
- Website: https://www.stantontownship.org/

Stanton Township is a township in Goodhue County, Minnesota, United States. The population was 1,130 at the 2010 census.

Stanton Township was organized in 1858, and named for William Stanton, an early settler.

== Geography ==
Stanton Township is located in the northwest corner of Goodhue County, and immediately adjacent to Dakota County. Rice County is also nearby. The community of Stanton is located within Stanton Township. State Highway 19 (MN 19) and State Highway 56 (MN 56) are two of the main routes in the township.

According to the United States Census Bureau, the township has a total area of 23.9 square miles (61.8 km^{2}), of which 22.7 square miles (58.8 km^{2}) is land and 1.1 square miles (2.9 km^{2}) (4.74%) is water.

== Demographics ==
As of the census of 2010, there were 1,130 people living in the township. The population density was 49.8 inhabitants per square mile (19.2/km^{2}). There were 434 housing units at an average density of 19.1/sq mi (6.5/km^{2}). The racial makeup of the township was 98.05% White, 0.09% Native American, 0.27% Asian, 0.18% African American, 0.44% from other races, and 0.97% from two or more races. Hispanic or Latino of any race were 1.59% of the population.

There were 410 households, out of which 34.6% had children under the age of 18 living with them.

In the township the population was spread out, with 24.8% under the age of 18, 6.7% from 18 to 24, 8.9% from 25 to 34, 23.3% from 35 to 49, 23.9% from 50 to 64, and 12.4% who were 65 years of age or older. For every 100 females, there were 110.0 males.

As of the census of 2000, the median income for a household in the township was $60,972, and the median income for a family was $65,000. Males had a median income of $41,033 versus $27,768 for females. The per capita income for the township was $23,473. About 2.8% of families and 2.8% of the population were below the poverty line, including 2.4% of those under age 18 and 6.8% of those age 65 or over.
