= Ravenna Township, Dakota County, Minnesota =

Township in Minnesota, United States

Ravenna Township
- Township
- Location within the state of Minnesota Ravenna Township (the United States)
- Coordinates: 44°40′41″N 92°45′53″W
- Country: United States
- State: Minnesota
- County: Dakota

Area
  - Total: 21.9 sq mi (56.6 km^{2})
  - Land: 20.6 sq mi (53.4 km^{2})
  - Water: 1.3 sq mi (3.3 km^{2})
- Elevation: 764 ft (233 m)

Population (2020)
  - Total: 2,354
  - Density: 114/sq mi (44.1/km^{2})
- Time zone: UTC-6 (Central (CST))
  - Summer (DST): UTC-5 (CDT)
- FIPS code: 27-53260
- GNIS feature ID: 0665381
- Website: https://ravennatownship.org/

Ravenna Township is a township in Dakota County, Minnesota, United States. The population was 2,354 at the 2020 census.

Ravenna Township was organized in 1860, and named after Ravenna, Ohio.

== Geography ==
According to the United States Census Bureau, the township has a total area of 21.9 square miles (57 km^{2}), of which 20.6 square miles (53 km^{2}) is land and 1.3 square miles (3.4 km^{2}), or 5.76%, is water.

== Demographics ==
Historical population
Census	Pop.	Note	%±
1860	142		—
1870	236		66.2%
1880	283		19.9%
1890	264		−6.7%
1900	259		−1.9%
1910	314		21.2%
1920	258		−17.8%
1930	241		−6.6%
1940	266		10.4%
1950	202		−24.1%
1960	274		35.6%
1970	550		100.7%
1980	1,683		206.0%
1990	1,926		14.4%
2000	2,355		22.3%
2010	2,336		−0.8%
2020	2,354		0.8%
U.S. Decennial Census

As of the census of 2000, there were 2,355 people, 734 households, and 667 families residing in the township. The population density was 114.3 inhabitants per square mile (44.1/km^{2}). There were 741 housing units at an average density of 36.0 per square mile (13.9/km^{2}). The racial makeup of the township was 97.07% White, 0.89% African American, 0.93% Native American, 0.30% Asian, 0.30% from other races, and 0.51% from two or more races. Hispanic or Latino of any race were 0.81% of the population.

There were 734 households, out of which 49.0% had children under the age of 18 living with them, 84.7% were married couples living together, 2.5% had a female householder with no husband present, and 9.1% were non-families. 6.5% of all households were made up of individuals, and 1.0% had someone living alone who was 65 years of age or older. The average household size was 3.21 and the average family size was 3.33.

In the township the population was spread out, with 31.6% under the age of 18, 6.8% from 18 to 24, 30.8% from 25 to 44, 27.2% from 45 to 64, and 3.6% who were 65 years of age or older. The median age was 36 years. For every 100 females, there were 108.0 males. For every 100 females age 18 and over, there were 111.4 males.

The median income for a household in the township was $74,286, and the median income for a family was $74,792. Males had a median income of $48,713 versus $31,940 for females. The per capita income for the township was $23,987. About 1.2% of families and 1.4% of the population were below the poverty line, including 1.1% of those under age 18 and none of those age 65 or over.
