= Vermillion Township, Dakota County, Minnesota =

Township in Minnesota, United States

Vermillion Township
- Township
- Location within the state of Minnesota Vermillion Township (the United States)
- Coordinates: 44°39′40″N 92°59′23″W
- Country: United States
- State: Minnesota
- County: Dakota

Area
  - Total: 34.1 sq mi (88.4 km^{2})
  - Land: 34.1 sq mi (88.4 km^{2})
  - Water: 0 sq mi (0.0 km^{2})
- Elevation: 896 ft (273 m)

Population (2020)
  - Total: 1,290
  - Density: 38/sq mi (14.6/km^{2})
- Time zone: UTC-6 (Central (CST))
  - Summer (DST): UTC-5 (CDT)
- ZIP code: 55085
- Area code: 651
- FIPS code: 27-66820
- GNIS feature ID: 0665860
- Website: https://vermilliontownshipmn.com/

Vermillion Township is a township in Dakota County, Minnesota, United States. The population was 1,290 at the 2020 census.

Vermillion Township was organized in 1858, and took its name from the Vermillion River.

== Geography ==
According to the United States Census Bureau, the township has a total area of 34.1 square miles (88.4 km^{2}), all land.

The city of Vermillion is geographically within Vermillion Township but is a separate entity. The city of Coates is at the northwest corner of Vermillion Township.

== Demographics ==
Historical population
Census	Pop.	Note	%±
1860	205		—
1870	652		218.0%
1880	819		25.6%
1890	780		−4.8%
1900	830		6.4%
1910	909		9.5%
1920	791		−13.0%
1930	741		−6.3%
1940	722		−2.6%
1950	731		1.2%
1960	649		−11.2%
1970	779		20.0%
1980	1,070		37.4%
1990	1,201		12.2%
2000	1,243		3.5%
2010	1,192		−4.1%
2020	1,290		8.2%
U.S. Decennial Census

As of the census of 2000, there were 1,243 people, 395 households, and 325 families residing in the township. The population density was 36.4 inhabitants per square mile (14.1/km^{2}). There were 403 housing units at an average density of 11.8/sq mi (4.6/km^{2}). The racial makeup of the township was 97.51% White, 0.16% African American, 0.32% Native American, 0.16% Asian, 0.08% Pacific Islander, 1.13% from other races, and 0.64% from two or more races. Hispanic or Latino of any race were 1.05% of the population.

There were 395 households, out of which 45.6% had children under the age of 18 living with them, 71.4% were married couples living together, 5.1% had a female householder with no husband present, and 17.7% were non-families. 12.7% of all households were made up of individuals, and 3.3% had someone living alone who was 65 years of age or older. The average household size was 3.15 and the average family size was 3.46.

In the township the population was spread out, with 31.8% under the age of 18, 9.6% from 18 to 24, 29.5% from 25 to 44, 22.8% from 45 to 64, and 6.3% who were 65 years of age or older. The median age was 36 years. For every 100 females, there were 111.0 males. For every 100 females age 18 and over, there were 114.7 males.

The median income for a household in the township was $64,118, and the median income for a family was $69,688. Males had a median income of $46,184 versus $29,750 for females. The per capita income for the township was $24,783. About 2.7% of families and 3.1% of the population were below the poverty line, including 4.0% of those under age 18 and 2.3% of those age 65 or over.
