= Henry F. Wagner =

Iowa Supreme Court justice (1874–1943)

Henry Wagner

Chief Justice of the Iowa Supreme Court
- In office January 1, 1932 – July 1, 1932

Justice of the Iowa Supreme Court
- In office September 6, 1927 – December 31, 1932
- Preceded by: Charles W. Vermillion

Personal details
- Born: February 11, 1874
- Died: November 10, 1943 (aged 69)

Henry F. Wagner (February 11, 1874 – November 10, 1943) was a justice of the Iowa Supreme Court from September 6, 1927, to December 31, 1932, appointed from Keokuk County, Iowa.

Political offices
| Preceded by Charles W. Vermillion | Justice of the Iowa Supreme Court; 1927–1932 | Succeeded by |
