= Lake Byllesby (Cannon River) =

Lake in Minnesota, U.S.

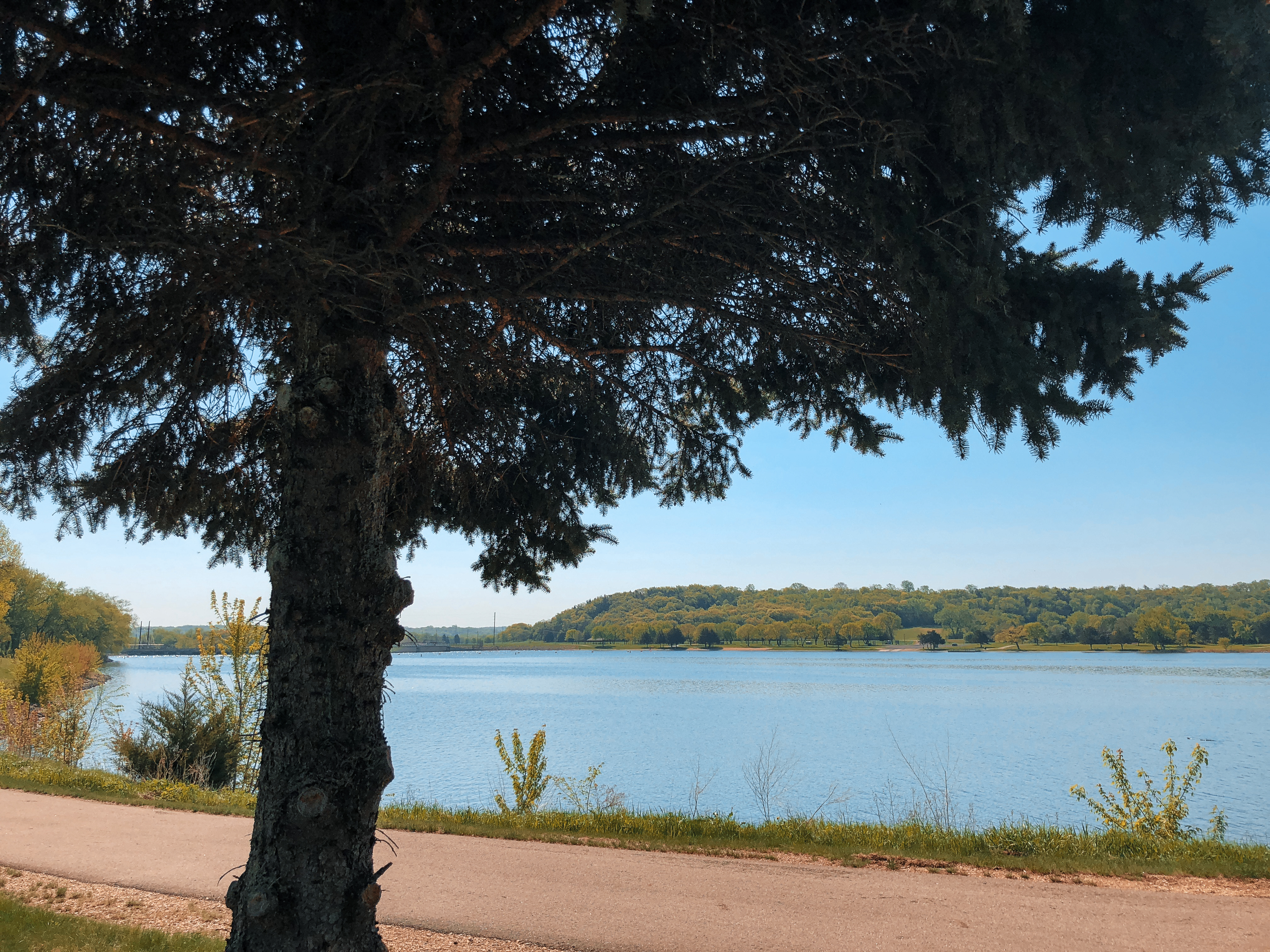

- Location within Minnesota Location within the United States
- Location: Dakota County and Goodhue County, Minnesota
- Coordinates: 44°31′00″N 92°58′05″W
- Type: reservoir
- Primary inflows: Cannon River
- Primary outflows: Cannon River
- Basin countries: United States
- Max. length: 4 miles (6.4 km)
- Max. width: 1 mile (1.6 km)
- Surface area: 1,432 acres (580 ha)
- Average depth: 10–35 ft (3.0–10.7 m) (average)
- Max. depth: 50 ft (15 m)
- Water volume: 20,000 acre⋅ft (0.025 km^{3})

Lake Byllesby is a 1,432 acres (580 ha) artificial lake in northern Minnesota with an associated regional park. It was formed after the construction of Byllesby Dam in 1910. It is designated as an Important Bird Area by the National Audubon Society for its importance for bird habitat in the Cannon River Valley.

== Fishing ==
According to the Minnesota Department of Natural Resources (MN DNR), the lake is home to the following fish species: black bullhead, black crappie, bluegill, channel catfish, crappie, green sunfish, hybrid sunfish, largemouth bass, northern pike, pumpkinseed, smallmouth bass, walleye, white bass, white crappie, yellow bullhead, yellow perch, bigmouth buffalo, bowfin (dogfish), carpsucker, common carp, freshwater drum, golden redhorse, greater redhorse, quillback, shorthead redhorse, silver redhorse, white sucker, bluntnose minnow, emerald shiner, and golden shiner.

== Invasive species ==
According to the Minnesota Department of Natural Resources, Flowering rush is prevalent in the lake and is considered an invasive species. It is illegal under Minnesota State Law to transport this species away from the lake.

== See also ==
- List of lakes in Minnesota
- Byllesby Dam
- List of dams and reservoirs in Minnesota
- Hydroelectric power in the United States
- List of dams and reservoirs in United States
