= Steven Engler (politician) =

American politician

Steve Engler

Member of the Minnesota Senate from the 25th district
- In office 1977–1982

Personal details
- Born: Steven Engler; November 6, 1949 (age 76) Randolph, Minnesota, U.S.
- Party: Republican
- Education: Minnesota State University, Mankato (BA)

Steven "Steve" Engler (born November 6, 1949) is an American politician and farmer.

== Early life and education ==
Engler was born in Randolph, Minnesota and graduated from Randolph High School in 1967. He received his bachelor's degree in history and economics from Minnesota State University, Mankato in 1971.

== Career ==
Engler lived in Randolph, Minnesota, and was a farmer. He served in the Minnesota Senate from 1977 to 1982 and was a Republican.
