= Stanton Airfield =

- The airfield seen from Minnesota State Highway 19 in 2021
- IATA: SYN; ICAO: KSYN; FAA LID: SYN

Summary
- Airport type: Public
- Owner: Stanton Sport Aviation, Inc.
- Serves: Stanton, Minnesota
- Elevation AMSL: 920 ft / 280 m
- Coordinates: 44°28′32″N 093°00′59″W
- Website: StantonAirfield.com

Map
- Location of airport in Minnesota SYN (the United States)

Runways
Direction	Length		Surface
Direction	ft	m	Surface
9/27	1,970	600	Turf
18/36	2,550	777	Turf

Statistics (2007)
- Aircraft operations: 15,000
- Based aircraft: 47
- Sources: Minnesota DOT, FAA

Stanton Airfield (IATA: SYN, ICAO: KSYN, FAA LID: SYN) is a public use airport located one nautical mile (1.85 km) east of the central business district of Stanton, in Goodhue County, Minnesota, United States. The airport is privately owned by Stanton Sport Aviation, Inc.

== History ==
Carleton Airport has been in operation since 1942, when Carleton College bought a farm to use as an airport to train pilots for World War II. In 1944, the college leased the field to Triangle Aviation, operated by Malcolm and Margaret Manuel, which eventually bought the airport in 1955. In 1990, Stanton Sport Aviation was formed to purchase the airport. The airport was added to the National Register of Historic Places in 2004.

== Facilities and aircraft ==
Stanton Airfield covers an area of 158 acres (64 ha) at an elevation of 920 feet (280 m) above mean sea level. It has two runways with turf surfaces: 9/27 is 1,970 by 180 feet (600 x 55 m) and 18/36 is 2,550 by 200 feet (777 x 61 m).

For the 12-month period ending August 31, 2007, the airport had 15,000 general aviation aircraft operations, an average of 41 per day. At that time there were 47 aircraft based at this airport: 36% single-engine and 64% glider.

== See also ==
- List of airports in Minnesota
