= USS Vermillion =

USS Vermillion could be referring to a number of different ships in the United States Navy. All of these vessels are named for a bay located in the Gulf of Mexico off the coast of Louisiana, southeast of Vermilion Parish and southwest of Iberia Parish.

Confusion is caused by the fact that "Vermillion" is frequently spelled "Vermilion" with only one "L".

- USS Vermillion (CVE-52) - as a Prince William-class auxiliary escort carrier assigned to Great Britain on 23 June 1943. In 1944 commissioned in the Royal Navy as HMS Smiter (D55).
- USS Vermilion (AKA-107) (with one "L") - an attack transport, built in 1944 and served until 1971.
- USS Vermillion Bay (CVE-108) - a Commencement Bay-class escort carrier was renamed Kula Gulf on 6 November 1943, prior to the laying of her keel.
