= Coates, Minnesota =

Town in Minnesota

Coates
- Village
- Location of the city of Coates within Dakota County, Minnesota
- Coordinates: 44°42′54″N 93°2′6″W
- Country: United States
- State: Minnesota
- County: Dakota
- Village: 1953

Government
  - Type: City
  - Mayor: Craig Franzmeier
  - Clerk and Treasurer: Sherri Leflay

Area
  - Total: 1.50 sq mi (3.88 km^{2})
  - Land: 1.50 sq mi (3.88 km^{2})
  - Water: 0 sq mi (0.00 km^{2})
- Elevation: 912 ft (278 m)

Population (2020)
  - Total: 147
  - Density: 98.1/sq mi (37.89/km^{2})
- Time zone: UTC-6 (Central (CST))
  - Summer (DST): UTC-5 (CDT)
- Area code: 651
- FIPS code: 27-12376
- GNIS feature ID: 0641366
- Website: Official website

Coates is a town in the U.S. state of Minnesota located west of the Upper Mississippi River on the exurban fringe in central Dakota County.

U.S. Highway 52 connects north to the city of Saint Paul, while County Road 46 draws east–west to nearby suburban cities. As of the 2020 census, Coates had a population of 147. It is named for Civil War Captain Henry C. Coates who served in the 1st Minnesota Volunteer Infantry.

Major employers are in trucking, moving and recycling services. The city is popular among people from the Twin Cities for the House of Coates, a burger restaurant opened in 1962. St. Agatha's Catholic Church serves as city hall.

Originally a rural post office hub in the 1900s, the U.S. Postal Service now designates addresses as part of the larger nearby city of Rosemount. The city of Coates was officially incorporated in 1953 at the northwest corner of Vermillion Township.

== Geography ==
According to the United States Census Bureau, the city has a total area of 1.41 square miles (3.65 km^{2}), all land.

== Demographics ==
Historical population
Census	Pop.	Note	%±
1960	202		—
1970	212		5.0%
1980	207		−2.4%
1990	186		−10.1%
2000	163		−12.4%
2010	161		−1.2%
2020	147		−8.7%
U.S. Decennial Census

=== 2010 census ===
As of the census of 2010, there were 161 people, 66 households, and 41 families living in the city. The population density was 114.2 inhabitants per square mile (44.1/km^{2}). There were 71 housing units at an average density of 50.4 per square mile (19.5/km^{2}). The racial makeup of the city was 96.3% White, 2.5% Asian, and 1.2% from two or more races. Hispanic or Latino of any race were 2.5% of the population.

There were 66 households, of which 30.3% had children under the age of 18 living with them, 47.0% were married couples living together, 10.6% had a female householder with no husband present, 4.5% had a male householder with no wife present, and 37.9% were non-families. 28.8% of all households were made up of individuals, and 1.5% had someone living alone who was 65 years of age or older. The average household size was 2.44 and the average family size was 2.95.

The median age in the city was 36.2 years. 23% of residents were under the age of 18; 9.4% were between the ages of 18 and 24; 29.3% were from 25 to 44; 28.6% were from 45 to 64; and 9.9% were 65 years of age or older. The gender makeup of the city was 56.5% male and 43.5% female.

=== 2000 census ===
As of the census of 2000, there were 163 people, 64 households, and 36 families living in the city. The population density was 116.9 inhabitants per square mile (45.1/km^{2}). There were 66 housing units at an average density of 47.3 per square mile (18.3/km^{2}). The racial makeup of the city was 94.48% White, 0.61% Native American, 4.29% Asian, and 0.61% from two or more races.

There were 64 households, out of which 29.7% had children under the age of 18 living with them, 45.3% were married couples living together, 9.4% had a female householder with no husband present, and 42.2% were non-families. 29.7% of all households were made up of individuals, and 7.8% had someone living alone who was 65 years of age or older. The average household size was 2.55 and the average family size was 3.38.

In the city, the population was spread out, with 26.4% under the age of 18, 13.5% from 18 to 24, 30.7% from 25 to 44, 23.3% from 45 to 64, and 6.1% who were 65 years of age or older. The median age was 33 years. For every 100 females, there were 123.3 males. For every 100 females age 18 and over, there were 126.4 males.

The median income for a household in the city was $48,958, and the median income for a family was $57,500. Males had a median income of $30,000 versus $27,083 for females. The per capita income for the city was $20,348. About 5.3% of families and 7.9% of the population were below the poverty line, including none of those under the age of eighteen or sixty five or over.
