= Randolph Township, Dakota County, Minnesota =

Township in Minnesota, United States

Randolph Township
- Township
- Location within the state of Minnesota Randolph Township (the United States)
- Coordinates: 44°31′17″N 92°57′52″W
- Country: United States
- State: Minnesota
- County: Dakota

Area
  - Total: 10.6 sq mi (27.5 km^{2})
  - Land: 9.4 sq mi (24.4 km^{2})
  - Water: 1.2 sq mi (3.1 km^{2})
- Elevation: 866 ft (264 m)

Population (2020)
  - Total: 760
  - Density: 81/sq mi (31.1/km^{2})
- Time zone: UTC-6 (Central (CST))
  - Summer (DST): UTC-5 (CDT)
- ZIP code: 55065
- Area code: 507
- FIPS code: 27-53116
- GNIS feature ID: 0665377
- Website: https://www.randolph-township.com/

Randolph Township is a township in Dakota County, Minnesota, United States. The population was 760 at the 2020 census.

Randolph Township was organized in 1858, and named for John Randolph of Roanoke.

== Geography ==
According to the United States Census Bureau, the township has a total area of 10.6 square miles (27.5 km^{2}), of which 9.4 square miles (24.4 km^{2}) is land and 1.2 square miles (3.1 km^{2}) (11.39%) is water.

The city of Randolph is geographically within Randolph Township but is a separate entity.

== Demographics ==
Historical population
Census	Pop.	Note	%±
1860	136		—
1870	170		25.0%
1880	235		38.2%
1890	218		−7.2%
1900	292		33.9%
1910	214		−26.7%
1920	138		−35.5%
1930	146		5.8%
1940	145		−0.7%
1950	149		2.8%
1960	178		19.5%
1970	267		50.0%
1980	385		44.2%
1990	448		16.4%
2000	536		19.6%
2010	659		22.9%
2020	760		15.3%
U.S. Decennial Census

As of the census of 2000, there were 536 people, 192 households, and 157 families residing in the township. The population density was 57.0 inhabitants per square mile (22.0/km^{2}). There were 207 housing units at an average density of 22.0/sq mi (8.5/km^{2}). The racial makeup of the township was 99.44% White, 0.19% Native American, 0.19% from other races, and 0.19% from two or more races. Hispanic or Latino of any race were 2.43% of the population.

There were 192 households, out of which 31.8% had children under the age of 18 living with them, 74.5% were married couples living together, 2.1% had a female householder with no husband present, and 18.2% were non-families. 13.0% of all households were made up of individuals, and 6.3% had someone living alone who was 65 years of age or older. The average household size was 2.79 and the average family size was 3.09.

In the township the population was spread out, with 25.2% under the age of 18, 8.2% from 18 to 24, 28.0% from 25 to 44, 27.2% from 45 to 64, and 11.4% who were 65 years of age or older. The median age was 38 years. For every 100 females, there were 101.5 males. For every 100 females age 18 and over, there were 109.9 males.

The median income for a household in the township was $62,222, and the median income for a family was $66,667. Males had a median income of $45,000 versus $26,094 for females. The per capita income for the township was $28,277. About 0.6% of families and 3.1% of the population were below the poverty line, including 4.1% of those under age 18 and 8.2% of those age 65 or over.
