= Charles W. Vermillion =

American judge (1866–1927)

Charles Vermillion

Justice of the Iowa Supreme Court
- In office November 15, 1923 – September 3, 1927
- Preceded by: Silas M. Weaver
- Succeeded by: Henry F. Wagner

Personal details
- Born: November 6, 1866 Centerville, Iowa
- Died: September 2, 1927 (aged 60) Des Moines, Iowa

Charles W. Vermillion (November 6, 1866 – September 2, 1927) was a justice of the Iowa Supreme Court from November 15, 1923, to September 3, 1927, appointed from Appanoose County, Iowa.

Born at Centerville, Iowa, Vermillion received degrees from DePauw University and the University of Michigan.

In 1923, Governor Nathan E. Kendall appointed Vermillion to a seat on the Iowa Supreme Court vacated by the death of Silas M. Weaver. Vermillion took his oath of office on November 15, 1923. Vermillion was then elected to the remainder of the term.

He died at the age of 60 in a Des Moines hospital, ten days after undergoing kidney surgery.

Political offices
Preceded by Silas M. Weaver	Justice of the Iowa Supreme Court; 1923–1927	Succeeded by Henry F. Wagner
