= Josiah Given =

American judge (1828–1908)

Justice of the Iowa Supreme Court
- In office March 12, 1889 – December 31, 1901

Personal details
- Born: August 31, 1828 Murrysville, Pennsylvania on August 31, 1828
- Died: February 3, 1908 (aged 79) Des Moines, Iowa
- Spouse: Elizabeth Armor (m. 1851)

Military service
- Branch: Union Army
- Rank: Brigadier General
- Unit: 74th Ohio Infantry Regiment
- Battles/wars: American Civil War

Josiah Given (August 31, 1828 – February 3, 1908) was a justice of the Iowa Supreme Court from March 12, 1889 to December 31, 1901, appointed from Polk County, Iowa. He also served as colonel of the 74th Ohio Infantry Regiment during the American Civil War, receiving a brevet to brigadier general.

== Biography ==
Given was born in Murrysville, Pennsylvania on August 31, 1828 of John and Jane Clendenning Given, who had immigrated from Ireland. In 1838 his family moved to Holmes County, Ohio. In 1847 he enlisted in an Ohio regiment and served in the Mexican–American War. At the end of the war he returned to Ohio to study law in the office of his older brother William, and was admitted to the bar in Stark County, Ohio in 1850. He married Elizabeth Armor in Millersburg, Ohio on October 6, 1851. Starting in 1856 he had a law practice in Coshocton, Ohio.

When the American Civil War started in 1861 he immediately re-enlisted, and during the war served with the 24th Ohio Infantry as a Captain, the 18th Ohio Infantry as a Lieutenant Colonel and the 74th Ohio Infantry as a colonel. He participated in 22 battles over the course of the war.

After the war, he served as Postmaster of the United States House of Representatives during the 39th Congress, sponsored by James A. Garfield, who was then a representative from Ohio.

He moved to Des Moines, Iowa after that to practice law. He served as District Attorney in Polk County and various judicial positions including circuit judge, district judge, and justice of the Iowa Supreme Court.

He died in Des Moines on February 3, 1908 and was buried in Woodland Cemetery.

Political offices
Preceded by Joseph Rea Reed	Justice of the Iowa Supreme Court; 1889–1901	Succeeded by Silas M. Weaver
