= Sydney Vermillion =

American–Armenian footballer (born 1988)

Sydney Vermillion Սիդնի Վերմիլլիոն (Armenian)
Personal information
- Full name: Sydney Renee Vermillion
- Date of birth: 7 March 1988 (age 38)
- Place of birth: Los Angeles County, California, United States
- Position: Defender

College career
Years	Team	Apps	(Gls)
2006–2009	Cal State Northridge Matadors	76	(?)

International career^{‡}
2021–	Armenia	1	(0)
- ‡ National team caps and goals as of 8 April 2021.

Sydney Renee Vermillion (born 7 March 1988) is a US-born Armenian footballer who plays as a defender for the Armenia women's national team.

== Early life ==
Vermillion was born in Los Angeles County, California. She is of Armenian descent as her mother's maiden name is Fagrian.

== College career ==
Vermillion has attended the California State University, Northridge in Northridge, Los Angeles, California.

== International career ==
Vermillion capped for Armenia at senior level in a 2–0 friendly win over Lebanon on 8 April 2021.

== Other ==
Vermillion expertly guest coached CASC's girls 2014 team on September 29th, 2024, resulting in a 5–2 away win over LA Surf LC.
