= Vermilion people =

The Vermilion were a tribe of the Native American Kickapoo, who migrated from the Great Lakes area and the mouth of the Wisconsin River to settle in Southern Illinois. The Algonquian-speaking Kickapoo (from Kiwǐgapawa, 'he stands about,' Or 'he moves about, standing now here, now there') were part of the Central Algonquians, and closely allied with the Sauk and Meskwaki. They were first noted in French records about 1670.

This division was affiliated with the Illiniwek. After the Illiniwek Confederacy was destroyed by northern tribes about 1765, the Kickapoo moved into their territory. The eastern Kickapoo, who settled near the Vermilion River, a branch of the Wabash River, were called the Vermilion band. They inhabited the area until the early 19th century.

By the mid-18th century, some of the area previously inhabited by the Vermilion was taken over by the Piankashaw.
