= Vermilion Range =

Vermilion Range may refer to:

- Vermilion Range (Alberta), Canada
- Vermilion Range (British Columbia), Canada
- Vermilion Range (Minnesota), United States
- Vermilion Range (SoC), the EP80578 family of Intel processors
