= List of county roads in Yellow Medicine County, Minnesota =

Highway names
- Interstates: Interstate X (I-X)
- US Highways: U.S. Highway X (US X)
- State: Trunk Highway X (MN X or TH X)
- County State-Aid Highways: County State-Aid Highway X (CSAH X)
- County Roads: County Road X (CR X)

System links
- County roads of Minnesota; Yellow Medicine County

The following is a list of county-maintained roads in Yellow Medicine County, Minnesota, United States. Some of the routes included in this list are also county-state-aid-highways (CSAH.)

== Route list ==
Number	Length (mi)	Length (km)	Southern or western terminus	Northern or eastern terminus	Local names	Formed	Removed	Notes
CSAH 1	—	—	Lyon County line (County 10)	Redwood County line (County 9)		—	—	
CSAH 2	—	—	US 59 in Normania Township	Redwood County line (County 27)		—	—	
CSAH 3	—	—	MN 68 in Hammer Township	MN 274 in Minnesota Falls Township		—	—	
CSAH 4	—	—	South Dakota state line	US 75 and MN 67 in Oshkosh Township		—	—	
CSAH 5	—	—	Lac qui Parle County line (County 2)	US 212 in Stony Run Township		—	—	
CSAH 6	—	—	CSAH 46 in Posen Township	CSAH 2 in Wood Lake		—	—	
CSAH 7	—	—	CSAH 5 in Stony Run Township	Chippewa County line (County 20)		—	—	
CSAH 8	—	—	Lyon County line (County 23)	CSAH 19 in Lisbon Township		—	—	
CSAH 9	—	—	Lyon County line (County 17)	Lac qui Parle County line (County 29)		—	—	
CSAH 10	—	—	Lyon County line (County 3)	Lac qui Parle County line (County 27)		—	—	
CSAH 11	—	—	Lyon County line (County 1)	Lac qui Parle County line (County 23)		—	—	
CSAH 12	—	—	CSAH 16 in Porter	CSAH 33 in Oshkosh Township		—	—	
CSAH 13	—	—	MN 68 in Canby	Lac qui Parle County line (County 11)		—	—	
CSAH 14	—	—	MN 68 in Florida Township	Lac qui Parle County line (County 9)		—	—	
CSAH 15	—	—	Lincoln County line (County 1)	Lac qui Parle County line (County 7)		—	—	
CSAH 16	—	—	US 75 in Norman Township	CSAH 12 in Porter		—	—	
CSAH 17	—	—	CSAH 8 in Friendship Township	MN 274 in Minnesota Falls Township		—	—	
CSAH 18	—	—	US 59 in Normania Township	MN 67 in Sioux Agency Township		—	—	
CSAH 19	—	—	CSAH 8 in Lisbon Township	US 212 in Stony Run Township		—	—	
CSAH 20	—	—	MN 67 in Echo	CSAH 1 in Echo		—	—	
CSAH 21	—	—	MN 67 in Sioux Agency Township	Renville County line (County 10)		—	—	
CSAH 22	—	—	US 212, MN 23, and MN 67 in Granite Falls	Chippewa County line (County 5)		—	—	
CSAH 23	—	—	CSAH 26 in Posen Township	CSAH 1 in Echo Township		—	—	
CSAH 24	—	—	US 59 in Friendship Township	MN 67 in Clarkfield		—	—	
CSAH 26	—	—	Lyon County line	CSAH 23 in Posen Township		—	—	
CSAH 27	—	—	CSAH 10 in Burton Township	CSAH 9 in Swede Prairie Township		—	—	
CSAH 28	—	—	CSAH 11 in Burton Township	CSAH 9 in Swede Prairie Township		—	—	
CSAH 29	—	—	MN 68 in Norman Township	CSAH 12 in Wergeland Township		—	—	
CSAH 30	—	—	CSAH 15 in Fortier Township	MN 68 in Canby		—	—	
CSAH 31	—	—	CSAH 12 in Wergeland Township	CSAH 11 in Burton Township		—	—	
CSAH 32	—	—	CSAH 10 in Omro Township	US 59 in Friendship Township		—	—	
CSAH 33	—	—	CSAH 14 in Florida Township	CSAH 11 in Omro Township		—	—	
CSAH 34	—	—	CSAH 8 in Lisbon Township	US 212 in Stony Run Township		—	—	
CSAH 35	—	—	Lyon County line (County 19)	CSAH 3 in Normania Township		—	—	
CSAH 36	—	—	South Dakota state line	US 75 in Norman Township		—	—	
CSAH 37	—	—	MN 67 in Oshkosh Township	Lac qui Parle County line (County 21)		—	—	
CSAH 38	—	—	CSAH 43 in Hanley Falls	CSAH 18 in Hanley Falls		—	—	
CSAH 39	—	—	CSAH 17 in Minnesota Falls Township	MN 23 in Minnesota Falls Township		—	—	
CSAH 40	—	—	Lyon County line (County 9)	CSAH 18 in Sandnes Township		—	—	
CSAH 41	—	—	MN 23 in Sandnes Township	CSAH 18 in Hanley Falls		—	—	
CSAH 43	—	—	CSAH 2 in Sandnes Township	MN 67 in Omro Township		—	—	
CSAH 44	—	—	MN 274 in Minnesota Falls Township	MN 67 in Minnesota Falls Township		—	—	
CSAH 46	—	—	Lyon County line (County 22)	MN 67 in Echo Township		—	—	
CR A1	—	—	MN 19 and MN 67 in Echo Township	CSAH 21 in Sioux Agency Township		—	—	
CR A2	—	—	MN 67 in Echo Township	Redwood County line		—	—	
CR A3	—	—	CSAH 18 in Sioux Agency Township	MN 67 in Sioux Agency Township		—	—	
CR A4	—	—	CR A10 in Echo Township	MN 67 in Echo Township		—	—	
CR A5	—	—	CSAH 1 in Echo Township	CSAH 18 in Sioux Agency Township		—	—	
CR A6	—	—	CSAH 6 in Wood Lake Township	CR A5 in Wood Lake Township		—	—	
CR A7	—	—	CSAH 26 in Posen Township	CSAH 1 in Posen Township		—	—	
CR A8	—	—	CSAH 46 in Posen Township	CSAH 1 in Posen Township		—	—	
CR A9	—	—	CSAH 18 in Wood Lake Township	CSAH 3 in Wood Lake Township		—	—	
CR A10	—	—	CSAH 46 in Echo Township	CSAH 26 in Echo Township		—	—	
CR B1	—	—	MN 274 in Minnesota Falls Township	MN 67 in Minnesota Falls Township		—	—	
CR B2	—	—	CSAH 3 in Minnesota Falls Township	CSAH 17 in Minnesota Falls Township		—	—	
CR B3	—	—	CSAH 3 in Minnesota Falls Township	MN 67 in Minnesota Falls Township		—	—	
CR B4	—	—	CSAH 17 in Hazel Run Township	CSAH 5 in Stony Run Township		—	—	
CR B5	—	—	US 59 in Lisbon Township	CSAH 8 in Lisbon Township		—	—	
CR C1	—	—	Lyon County line	MN 23 in Sandnes Township		—	—	
CR C3	—	—	CSAH 17 in Hazel Run	CSAH 5 in Stony Run Township		—	—	
CR C4	—	—	US 59 in Friendship Township	CSAH 17 in Hazel Run Township		—	—	
CR C5	—	—	CSAH 9 in Swede Prairie Township	US 59 in Normania Township		—	—	
CR D1	—	—	CSAH 9 in Swede Prairie Township	US 59 in Normania Township		—	—	
CR D2	—	—	CSAH 3 in Tyro Township	Lac qui Parle County line		—	—	
CR D3	—	—	Lyon County line (County 57)	Lac qui Parle County line		—	—	
CR D4	—	—	CSAH 11 in Omro Township	CR D3 in Tyro Township		—	—	
CR D5	—	—	CSAH 11 in Burton Township	CSAH 10 in Burton Township		—	—	
CR D6	—	—	CSAH 12 in Wergeland Township	CSAH 11 in Burton Township		—	—	
CR D7	—	—	Lincoln County line	MN 67 in Oshkosh Township		—	—	
CR D8	—	—	CSAH 3 in Oshkosh Township	CSAH 33 in Oshkosh Township		—	—	
CR D9	—	—	US 75 in Norman Township	CSAH 12 in Wergeland Township		—	—	
CR E1	—	—	Lincoln County line	MN 68 in Norman Township		—	—	
CR E2	—	—	MN 68 in Hammer Township	Lac qui Parle County line		—	—	
CR E3	—	—	South Dakota state line	CSAH 14 in Florida Township		—	—	
CR E4	—	—	Lincoln County line	MN 68 in Fortier Township		—	—	
CR E5	—	—	South Dakota state line	CSAH 15 in Fortier Township		—	—	
