= Upper Sioux Indian Reservation =

In Minnesota Falls Township along the Minnesota River

Coordinates: 44°45′38″N 95°30′18″W

Upper Sioux Community
Pejhutazizi Oyate
- Location of Upper Sioux Community

Total population
- 482 enrolled citizens

Regions with significant populations
- United States (Minnesota)

Related ethnic groups
- Other Dakota peoples

The Upper Sioux Indian Reservation, or Pezihutazizi in Dakota, is the reservation of the Upper Sioux Community, a federally recognized tribe of the Dakota people, that includes the Mdewakanton.

The Upper Sioux Indian Reservation is located in Minnesota Falls Township along the Minnesota River in eastern Yellow Medicine County, Minnesota, five miles (8.0 km) south of Granite Falls. It was created in 1938 when 746 acres (3.02 km^{2}) of land were returned to the tribe by the federal government, under the Indian Reorganization Act encouraging tribal self-government.

As of the 2020 census, the reservation recorded a resident population of 120 persons. Its land area is currently 2.3 square miles (5.96 km^{2}; 1,472.00 acres), including off-reservation trust land. The tribe operates the Prairie's Edge Casino Resort. Every August, the Upper Sioux community holds its Pejhutazizi Oyate traditional wacipi (powwow).

== History ==
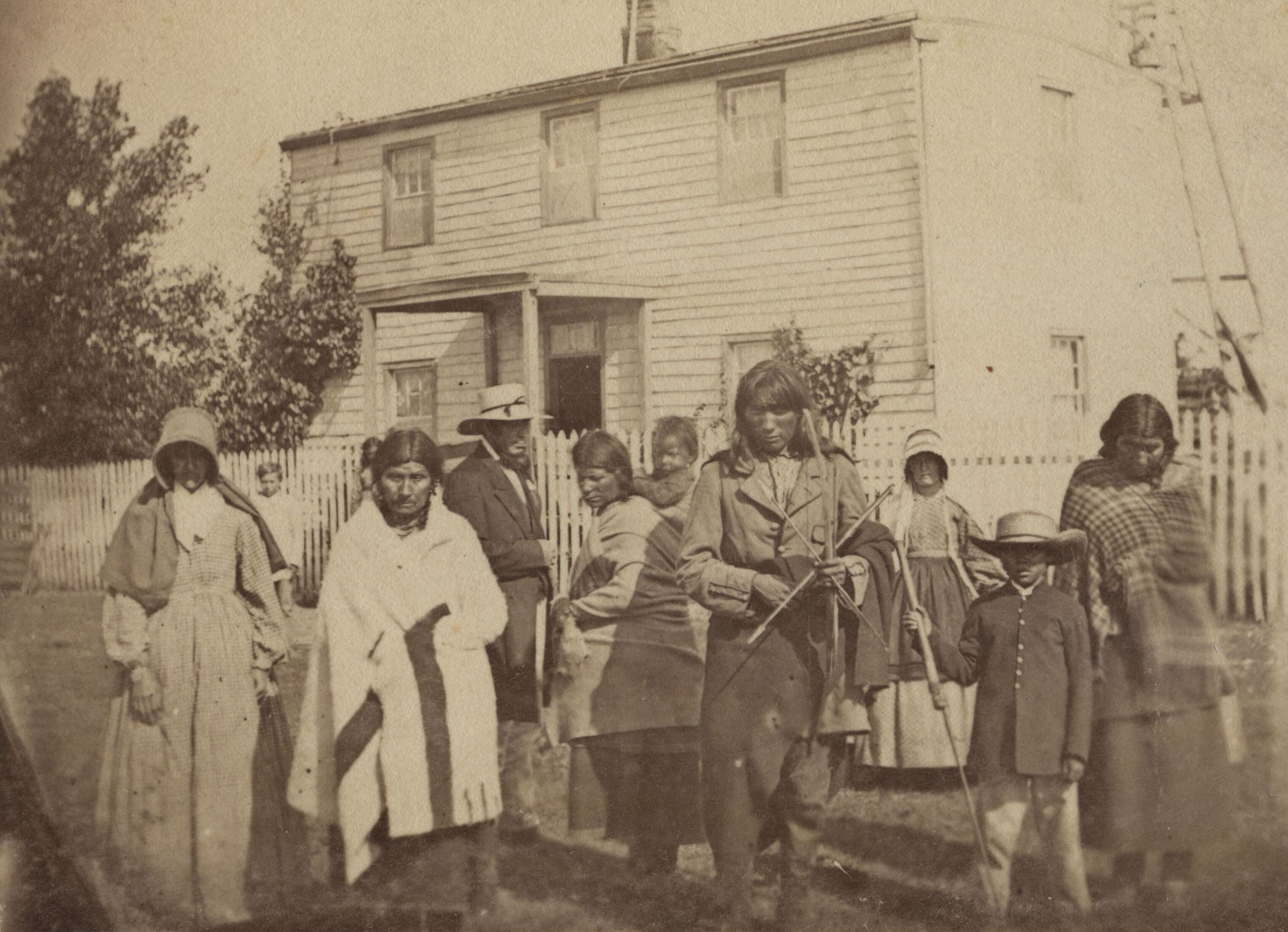
Dakota people with Dr. Thomas Smith Williamson near the Upper Sioux Agency. Photographed by Joel Emmons Whitney

This reservation was originally established for the Wahpeton and Sisseton bands of the Upper Dakota. Under the Treaty of Traverse des Sioux of 1851 with the United States, it encompassed an area about 20 miles (30 km) wide and 70 miles (110 km) long along the Minnesota River. Following the Dakota War of 1862, the federal government punished the Dakota by drastically reducing the sizes of two reservations along the river, in an attempt to force the Dakota out of the area. Many of the people did move westward, and many of their descendants live on reservations in South Dakota.

In 1938 the federal government returned 746 acres (3.02 km^{2}) of land to the tribe, who were mostly landless, under the Indian Reorganization Act of the President Franklin D. Roosevelt administration. It also encouraged tribes to revive their self-government.

In 2024, Minnesota returned around 2 square miles (5.2 km^{2}) from the Upper Sioux Agency State Park to the tribe.

=== Termination efforts ===
A decade later, the federal government began to promote the Indian termination policy, to end recognition of tribes they thought could successfully assimilate to mainstream society. Such termination would allocate their communal lands among individual households and end federal benefits associated with federal recognition. This policy was followed by the US government from the 1940s to the 1960s. The Department of Interior issued a memo dated 19 January 1955 for the Bureau of Indian Affairs (BIA) indicating that terminations were being reviewed in proposed legislation for four Indian communities of southwestern Minnesota, including the Lower Sioux Community in Redwood and Scott counties, the New Upper Sioux Community in Yellow Medicine County, the Prairie Island Community in Goodhue County, and about 15 individuals living on restricted tracts in Yellow Medicine County.

Discussions between the BIA and the Indians in the identified tribes had begun in 1953 and continued throughout 1954. Although the Prairie Island and Lower Sioux communities drafted agreements to divide communal lands into plots with individual land ownership, the Upper Sioux strongly opposed tribal lands being divided under fee-simple title.

On 26 January 1955, US Senator Edward Thye introduced a bill (S704) to provide for termination of the named tribes. In addition to resistance within the tribes, non-Native American residents of the area opposed termination, as they realized state expenditures might increase to accommodate services to those who would be classified as new residents, and they expressed their opposition to the committee reviewing the bill. The Minnesota Governor's Commission on Human Rights also opposed the legislation, indicating that it would "not adequately protect the interests of the Indians..." The bill died in committee, never reaching the Senate floor.

== Geography ==
According to the U.S. Census Bureau, the reservation and associated off-reservation trust land have a combined area of 2.35 square miles (6.1 km^{2}), of which 2.3 square miles (6.0 km^{2}) is land and 0.05 square miles (0.13 km^{2}) is water.

== Demographics ==
As of the census of 2020, the combined population of Upper Sioux Community and Off-Reservation Trust Land was 120. The population density was 52.1 inhabitants per square mile (20.1/km^{2}). There were 49 housing units at an average density of 21.3 per square mile (8.2/km^{2}). The racial makeup of the reservation and off-reservation trust land was 68.3% Native American, 8.3% White, 2.5% Black or African American, 0.8% from other races, and 20.0% from two or more races. Ethnically, the population was 4.2% Hispanic or Latino of any race. The 2020 census results may be inaccurate for locations like the Upper Sioux Community owing to the Census Bureau's implementation of differential privacy protections.

== Notable citizens ==
- Waziyatawin (Angela Wilson), Dakota author, professor and activist from Pezihutazizi Otunwe (Yellow Medicine Village)

== See also ==
- Sioux Agency Township, Minnesota
- Lower Sioux Indian Reservation
- Upper Sioux Agency State Park
- Minnesota Indian Affairs Council
