= Minnesota State Highway 274 =

State highway in Minnesota, United States

Trunk Highway 274
- MN 274 highlighted in red

Route information
- Maintained by MnDOT
- Length: 8.515 mi (13.704 km)
- Existed: July 1, 1949–September 27, 2022

Major junctions
- South end: CSAH 6 at Wood Lake
- North end: MN 23 near Granite Falls

Location
- Country: United States
- State: Minnesota
- Counties: Yellow Medicine

Highway system
- Minnesota Trunk Highway System; Interstate; US; State; Legislative; Scenic
← MN 271	→ MN 275

Minnesota State Highway 274 (MN 274) was a 8.515-mile-long (13.704 km) highway in southwest Minnesota, which ran from Wood Lake and continued north to an intersection with MN 23 near Granite Falls.

== Route description ==
MN 274 served as a north–south highway in southwest Minnesota between Wood Lake and Granite Falls. It was also known as 550th Street in Yellow Medicine County. The highway passed around the west side of Wood Lake near the town of Wood Lake. The roadway crossed the Yellow Medicine River near its intersection with CSAH 3.

== History ==
MN 274 was authorized on July 1, 1949. The route of the highway was paved in 1950.

The highway's original northern terminus was at MN 67 until MN 23 was rerouted between Hanley Falls and Granite Falls circa 1980.

MN 274 became part of MN 67 north of CSAH 2, and the section south of CSAH 2 was turned back on September 27, 2022.

The route was legally defined as Route 274 in the Minnesota Statutes.

== Major intersections ==
The entire route was in Yellow Medicine County.

Location	mi	km	Destinations	Notes
Wood Lake	0.000	0.000	CSAH 6 south	
Wood Lake	0.467	0.752	CSAH 2	
Minnesota Falls Township	8.501	13.681	MN 23	
1.000 mi = 1.609 km; 1.000 km = 0.621 mi
