= Minnesota State Highway 67 =

State highway in Minnesota, United States

Trunk Highway 67
- MN 67 highlighted in red, former alignment in blue

Route information
- Maintained by MnDOT
- Length: 85.076 mi (136.917 km)
- Existed: 1933–present

Major junctions
- West end: US 75 near Canby
- US 59 at Clarkfield; US 212 / MN 23 at Granite Falls; US 71 / MN 19 at Redwood Falls
- East end: MN 68 at Morgan

Location
- Country: United States
- State: Minnesota
- Counties: Yellow Medicine, Redwood

Highway system
- Minnesota Trunk Highway System; Interstate; US; State; Legislative; Scenic
← MN 66	→ MN 68

Minnesota State Highway 67 (MN 67) is an 83.026-mile-long (133.617 km) highway in southwest Minnesota, which runs from its intersection with U.S. Highway 75 in Oshkosh Township near Canby and continues east and southeast to its eastern terminus at its intersection with State Highway 68 in Morgan.

== Route description ==
Highway 67 serves as an east–west and north–south route in southwest Minnesota between Canby, Clarkfield, Granite Falls, Redwood Falls, and Morgan.

The highway is officially marked as an east–west route by its highway shields from beginning to end.

Highway 67 runs together with State Highway 19 for 14 miles (23 km), west of Redwood Falls.

== History ==
Trunk Highway 93
- Location: Redwood Falls to Morgan
- Length: 13 mi (21 km)
- Existed: 1934–1963

Highway 67 was authorized in 1920 from present-day Highway 19 south of Echo to Granite Falls. In 1934, it was extended westward to U.S. 75 at Canby. The route was expanded east to Redwood Falls and southeast to Morgan c. 1963.

Highway 67 was paved from Granite Falls to U.S. Highway 75 by 1940. The route was completely paved by 1953.

In April 2019, the Minnesota Department of Transportation (MN-DOT) closed Highway 67 in both directions approximately 8 miles southeast of the intersection of 67 and State Highway 23 in Granite Falls. The closure was necessary due to unstable ground deep underneath the roadbed, causing large cracks to appear in the road surface and rendering it impassable for traffic. A detour was placed, following (from southeast to northwest) Yellow Medicine County Road 2 and State Highway 274 between Echo and Granite Falls. MN-DOT permanently rerouted Highway 67 along this detour and closed off the failed section on September 27, 2022. The old roadway was redesignated as Minnesota State Highway 167) traveling southeast from Granite Falls. This is open as far as the former Upper Sioux Agency State Park, which was closed on February 16, 2024.

== Major intersections ==
County	Location	mi	km	Destinations	Notes
Yellow Medicine	Oshkosh Township	0.000	0.000	US 75 – Madison, Canby	Western terminus
Yellow Medicine	Clarkfield	19.039	30.640	US 59	
Yellow Medicine	Stony Run Township	31.259	50.306	US 212 west – Montevideo	Northern end of US 212 concurrency
Yellow Medicine	Granite Falls	32.358	52.075	US 212 east / MN 23 east	Eastern end of US 212 concurrency; northern end of MN 23 concurrency
Yellow Medicine	Granite Falls	32.571	52.418	MN 167 east	Formerly MN 67
Yellow Medicine	Minnesota Falls Township	34.738	55.905	MN 23 west – Marshall	Southern end of MN 23 concurrency
Yellow Medicine	Echo Township	56.936	91.630	MN 19 west – Marshall	Western end of MN 19 concurrency
Redwood	Redwood Falls	71.895	115.704	US 71 north / MN 19 east	Eastern end of MN 19 concurrency; northern end of US 71 concurrency
Redwood	Redwood Falls	72.350	116.436	US 71 south	Southern end of US 71 concurrency
Redwood	Morgan	85.076	136.917	MN 68 – Sleepy Eye, Marshall	Eastern terminus; roadway continues as MN 68
1.000 mi = 1.609 km; 1.000 km = 0.621 mi: Concurrency terminus
