= Norman Township, Minnesota =

Norman Township is the name of some places in the U.S. state of Minnesota:

- Norman Township, Pine County, Minnesota
- Norman Township, Yellow Medicine County, Minnesota

== See also ==
- Normania Township, Yellow Medicine County, Minnesota
- Normanna Township, St. Louis County, Minnesota
- Norman (disambiguation)
