= Normania =

Normania may refer to:

== Places ==
- Normania, Minnesota, unincorporated community, United States
- Normania Township, Yellow Medicine County, Minnesota, United States
- Normania Township, Benson County, North Dakota, United States

== Plants ==
- Solanum, a genus of plants which includes the potato and tomato; Normania is a synonym and a proposed section of Solanum

== See also ==
- Normannia (disambiguation)
- Normani (born 1996), American singer, songwriter and dancer
