= Upper Sioux Agency =

- U.S. National Register of Historic Places
- U.S. Historic district
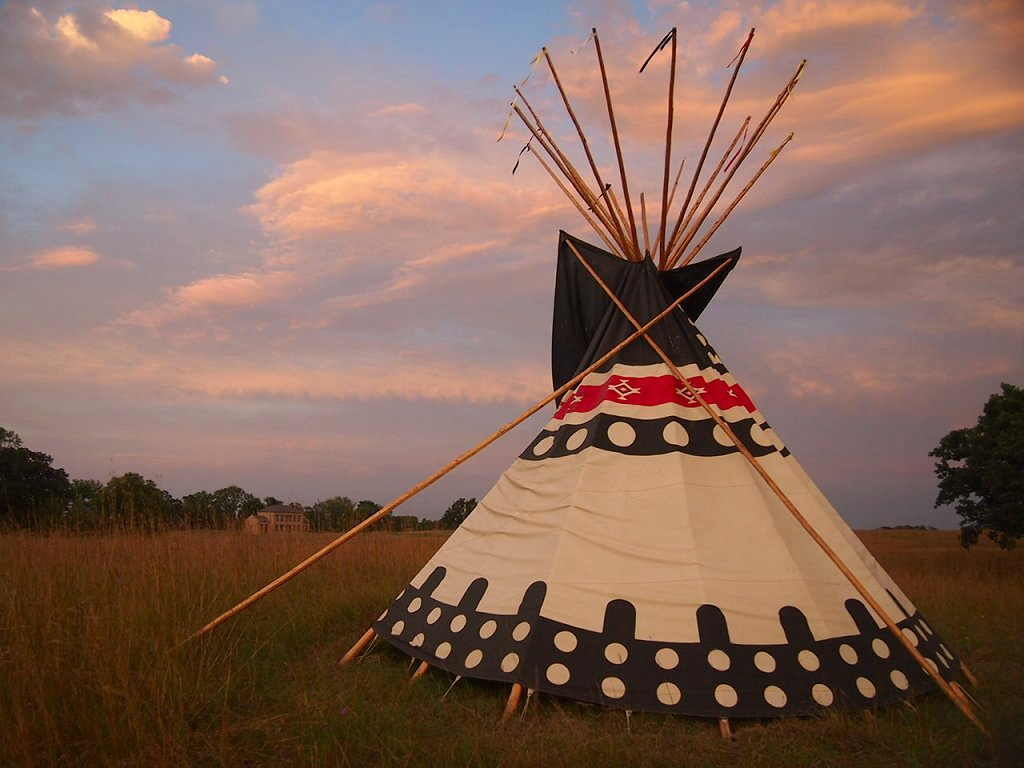

- Location within Minnesota Location within the United States
- Location: 5908 Highway 67, Sioux Agency Township, Minnesota, U.S.
- Nearest city: Granite Falls, Minnesota
- Coordinates: 44°44′5″N 95°27′24.23″W
- Area: 1,300 acres (530 ha)
- Built: 1854
- NRHP reference No.: 70000315
- Added to NRHP: October 15, 1970

Upper Sioux Agency (or Yellow Medicine Agency), was a federal administrative center in Minnesota established in response to treaties with the Dakota people in what became Yellow Medicine County. Located on the Minnesota River south of Granite Falls, Minnesota, the government-run campus of employee housing, warehouses and a manual labor school was destroyed in the Dakota War of 1862. The grave of Chief Walking Iron Mazomani, a leader of the Wahpetonwan (Dwellers in the Leaves) Dakota tribes, who was killed during the 1862 Dakota War's Battle of Wood Lake, is here. The site was listed on the National Register of Historic Places in 1970 for having state-level significance under the themes of archaeology, architecture, education, and social history.

Considered sacred for being a place where their ancestors died of starvation, the Upper Sioux Community has been working to regain the land since the 1860s. A ceremonial transfer was held in March with tribal officials, Governor Tim Walz and Lieutenant Governor Peggy Flanagan. Established as a Minnesota state park in 1963, the park was closed in February 2024 as authorized by the state legislature. State Route 67, which traverses through the park, was closed after unstable ground beneath the road made the highway impassable. The highway would have required expensive repairs along with the bridge over the Yellow Medicine River that has been compressed by the movement so much that it needs to be removed or replaced. State funds will be used to buy land for replacement recreational opportunities and the removal of structures from the site.
