= Norman Township =

Norman Township may refer to:

- Norman Township, Grundy County, Illinois
- Norman Township, Michigan
- Norman Township, Pine County, Minnesota
- Norman Township, Yellow Medicine County, Minnesota
- Norman Township, Dent County, Missouri
- Norman Township, Traill County, North Dakota, in Traill County, North Dakota

== See also ==
- Normania Township, Yellow Medicine County, Minnesota
