= Minnesota State Highway 68 =

State highway in Minnesota, United States

Trunk Highway 68
- MN 68 highlighted in red

Route information
- Maintained by MnDOT
- Length: 141.026 mi (226.959 km)
- Existed: 1920–present
- Tourist routes: Minnesota River Valley Scenic Byway

Major junctions
- West end: SD 22 at Fortier Township, at Minnesota — South Dakota state line
- US 75 at Canby US 59 / MN 23 at Marshall; US 71 at New Avon Township; MN 67 at Morgan; US 14 / MN 4 at Sleepy Eye US 14 / MN 15 at New Ulm
- East end: US 169 / MN 60 near Mankato

Location
- Country: United States
- State: Minnesota
- Counties: Yellow Medicine, Lincoln, Lyon, Redwood, Brown, Blue Earth

Highway system
- Minnesota Trunk Highway System; Interstate; US; State; Legislative; Scenic
← MN 67	→ US 69

Minnesota State Highway 68 (MN 68) is a 141.026-mile-long (226.959 km) highway in southwest and south-central Minnesota, which runs from South Dakota Highway 22 at the South Dakota state line near Canby, and continues east to its eastern terminus at its intersection with U.S. Highway 169 and State Highway 60 in South Bend Township near Mankato.

== Route description ==
State Highway 68 serves as an east–west route in southwest and south-central Minnesota between Canby, Minneota, Marshall, Morgan, Sleepy Eye, New Ulm, and Mankato.

Minneopa State Park is located five miles (8 km) west of Mankato. The park entrance is located on Highway 68 near its intersection with U.S. Highway 169.

Highway 68 has concurrencies with:

- U.S. Highway 59, in Marshall.
- State Highway 19, in and east of Marshall.
- U.S. Highway 71, in Redwood County.
- U.S. Highway 14, west of New Ulm.
- State Highway 15, south of New Ulm.

== History ==
=== Highway ===
Trunk Highway 272
- Location: East of Marshall to Morgan
- Length: 36 mi (58 km)
- Existed: 1949–1963

Trunk Highway 93
- Location: Morgan to North of Sleepy Eye
- Length: 12 mi (19 km)
- Existed: 1934–1963

Trunk Highway 83
- Location: South of New Ulm to Mankato
- Length: 25 mi (40 km)
- Existed: 1934–1963

Highway 68 was authorized in 1920 between Canby and Marshall.

Its western terminus was extended to the South Dakota state line in 1934.

In 1963, Highway 68 was expanded easterly between Marshall and Mankato by consolidating former State Highway 272, State Highway 93, and State Highway 83, and re-numbering them 68.

Highway 68 was paved from Marshall to Canby by 1940. Many remaining sections of the present day Highway 68 were still gravel by 1953. The present day route was completely paved by 1960.

== Major intersections ==
County	Location	mi	km	Destinations	Notes
Yellow Medicine	Fortier Township	0.000	0.000	SD 22 west – Clear Lake	Western terminus; Continuation into South Dakota
Yellow Medicine	Canby	8.926	14.365	US 75	
Lincoln	No major junctions				
Lyon	Marshall	38.653	62.206	US 59 north	Western end of US 59 concurrency
Lyon	Marshall	39.214	63.109	US 59 south / MN 19 west	Eastern end of US 59 concurrency; western end of MN 19 concurrency
Lyon	Marshall			MN 23 – Pipestone, Granite Falls	
Redwood	Westline Township	51.055	82.165	MN 19 east – Redwood Falls	Eastern end of MN 19 concurrency
Redwood	New Avon Township	76.321	122.827	US 71 south – Windom	Western end of US 71 concurrency
Redwood	New Avon Township	76.820	123.630	US 71 north – Redwood Falls	Eastern end of US 71 concurrency
Redwood	Morgan	86.924	139.891	MN 67 west – Redwood Falls	Eastern terminus of MN 67
Brown	Home Township	99.010	159.341	MN 4 north – Fairfax	Western end of MN 4 concurrency
Brown	Sleepy Eye	102.034	164.208	MN 4 south / US 14 west	Eastern end of MN 4 concurrency; western end of US 14 concurrency
Brown	New Ulm	115.842	186.430	US 14 east / MN 15 north / Minnesota River Valley Scenic Byway – Mankato, Winthrop	Eastern end of US 14 concurrency; western end of MN 15 concurrency
Brown	Cottonwood Township	119.708	192.651	MN 15 south – Madelia	Eastern end of MN 15 concurrency
Blue Earth	South Bend Township	141.228	227.284	US 169 / MN 60 / Minnesota River Valley Scenic Byway – Mankato	Eastern terminus
1.000 mi = 1.609 km; 1.000 km = 0.621 mi: Concurrency terminus
