= Lorne, Minnesota =

Unincorporated community in Minnesota, United States

Lorne
- Unincorporated community
- Location within Minnesota Location within the United States
- Coordinates: 44°44′46″N 95°34′28″W
- Country: United States
- State: Minnesota
- County: Yellow Medicine
- Elevation: 1,050 ft (320 m)
- Time zone: UTC-6 (Central (CST))
  - Summer (DST): UTC-5 (CDT)
- Area code: 320
- GNIS feature ID: 654805

Lorne is an unincorporated community in Minnesota Falls Township, Yellow Medicine County, in the U.S. state of Minnesota.

== History ==
Lorne was laid out in 1898, and named for Marquess of Lorne, a Governor General of Canada (1878–1883). A post office was established at Lorne in 1905, and remained in operation until 1935.
