= Oshkosh Township =

Oshkosh Township may refer to the following townships in the United States:

- Oshkosh Township, Yellow Medicine County, Minnesota
- Oshkosh Township, Wells County, North Dakota
