= Echo Township =

Echo Township may refer to one of the following places in the United States:

- Echo Township, Michigan
- Echo Township, Minnesota
