= Spellman Lake =

Lake in the state of Minnesota, United States

- Location within Minnesota Location within the United States
- Location: Normania Township, Yellow Medicine County, Minnesota
- Coordinates: 44.6690°N 95.7725°W
- Basin countries: United States

Spellman Lake is the name for two small lakes (North and South Spellman Lake), located 8 miles south of Clarkfield in Normania Township of Yellow Medicine County, Minnesota. The lakes and much of the surrounding area are designated as federal waterfowl production areas. There are also state owned public hunting grounds near the lakes. Nontoxic shot is required for all shooting in the area. The use of airboats on North and South Spellman Lakes is prohibited by law at all times. A public water access is maintained on the north lake by the Minnesota Department of Natural Resources. Hunters should be careful not to shoot protected birds such as bald eagles and swans that frequent the area.

The Minnesota Department of Natural Resources began a drawdown of the lakes on November 28, 2006. The water level was brought down to eliminate fish such as carp and bullheads. The water was drained through the summer of 2007, and then it was allowed to refill through precipitation after enough vegetation had grown. There were no plans to stock fish into the lakes and for it is managed as a fish-less system. The shallows depths of the lakes makes it unlikely for the survival of game fish.

== See also ==
- "Public Water Access, Lac qui Parle & Yellow Medicine Counties" (PDF). (1.00 MB)
