= Omro =

Omro is the name of several places in the United States:

- Omro Township, Minnesota
- Omro, Wisconsin
- Omro (town), Wisconsin
