= Spring Creek, Minnesota =

Unincorporated community in Minnesota, United States

Spring Creek
- Unincorporated community
- Location within Minnesota Location within the United States
- Coordinates: 44°43′05″N 95°50′55″W
- Country: United States
- State: Minnesota
- County: Yellow Medicine
- Elevation: 1,079 ft (329 m)
- Time zone: UTC-6 (Central (CST))
  - Summer (DST): UTC-5 (CDT)
- Area code: 320
- GNIS feature ID: 654955

Spring Creek is an unincorporated community in Friendship Township, Yellow Medicine County, Minnesota, United States.
