= Oshkosh =

Oshkosh may refer to:

== Places in the United States ==
- Oshkosh, Wisconsin, city and the largest place with the name
- Oshkosh (town), Wisconsin
- Oshkosh Township, Yellow Medicine County, Minnesota
- Oshkosh, Nebraska
- Oshkosh Township, Wells County, North Dakota

== Other ==
- Chief Oshkosh (1795–1858), chief of the Menominee American Indian tribe
- OshKosh B'gosh, a children's apparel company headquartered in Oshkosh, Wisconsin
- Oshkosh Corporation, an American company that designs and builds specialty trucks, military vehicles, truck bodies and access equipment
- EAA AirVenture Oshkosh, an aviation enthusiast gathering held each year at the end of July in Oshkosh, Wisconsin
- University of Wisconsin–Oshkosh
- Glacial Lake Oshkosh, a glacial lake in the Oshkosh, Wisconsin area, ancestral to Lake Winnebago
