= Normania, Minnesota =

Unincorporated community in Minnesota, United States

Normania
- Unincorporated community
- Location within Minnesota Location within the United States
- Coordinates: 44°38′48″N 95°48′31″W
- Country: United States
- State: Minnesota
- County: Yellow Medicine
- Elevation: 1,083 ft (330 m)
- Time zone: UTC-6 (Central (CST))
  - Summer (DST): UTC-5 (CDT)
- Area code: 320
- GNIS feature ID: 654848

Normania is an unincorporated community in Normania Township, Yellow Medicine County, Minnesota, United States.
