= Normannia =

Normannia may refer to:

- A former name of the Normandy region of France
- 1256 Normannia, an asteroid
- USS Normannia, a United States Navy patrol boat in commission from 1917 to 1918
- SS Normannia

== See also ==
- Normania (disambiguation)
