= Minnesota State Highway 23 =

State highway in Minnesota, United States

Trunk Highway 23
- MN 23 highlighted in red

Route information
- Maintained by MnDOT
- Length: 343.723 mi (553.169 km)
- Existed: 1920–present

Major junctions
- West end: I-90 near Beaver Creek
- US 75 at Pipestone; US 59 at Marshall; US 212 at Granite Falls; US 71 / US 12 at Willmar; I-94 / US 52 at St. Cloud; US 10 at St. Cloud; US 169 at Milaca; MN 65 at Mora; I-35 at Hinckley and Sandstone
- East end: I-35 / US 2 at Duluth

Location
- Country: United States
- State: Minnesota
- Counties: Rock, Pipestone, Lincoln, Lyon, Yellow Medicine, Chippewa, Renville, Kandiyohi, Stearns, Benton, Mille Lacs, Kanabec, Pine, Carlton, Douglas (WI), St. Louis

Highway system
- Minnesota Trunk Highway System; Interstate; US; State; Legislative; Scenic
← MN 22	→ MN 24

Minnesota State Highway 23 (MN 23) is a state highway that stretches from southwestern to northeastern Minnesota. At 343.723 miles (553.169 km) in length, it is the second longest state route in Minnesota, after MN 1.

This route, signed east–west, runs roughly diagonally across Minnesota from southwest to northeast. It indirectly connects Duluth to Sioux Falls, South Dakota, and passes through the cities of St. Cloud, Willmar, and Marshall.

MN 23 runs north from its interchange with Interstate 90 (I-90), 1.05 miles (1.69 km) east of the South Dakota line and 13 miles (21 km) east of Sioux Falls and then continues north and east across Minnesota to its terminus at its interchange with I-35 in Duluth.

== Route description ==
MN 23 directly serves Pipestone, Marshall, Granite Falls, Willmar, Paynesville, Cold Spring, St. Cloud, Foley, Milaca, Mora, Hinckley, Sandstone, and Duluth.

Portions of MN 23 that have been upgraded to a four-lane expressway include approximately nine miles (14 km) in the Marshall area in addition to longer stretches between Willmar and New London, and between Richmond and Waite Park (St. Cloud). For a majority of the Willmar area, MN 23 runs concurrently with U.S. Highway 71 (US 71), which includes a freeway bypass of the city. MN 23 crosses the Minnesota River at Granite Falls, and the Mississippi River in St. Cloud, over the Granite City Crossing bridge.

Running over surface streets in certain towns, MN 23 is also known as:

- Division Street in St. Cloud
- 4th Street in downtown Milaca
- Forest Avenue East in Mora, between MN 65 and Oslin Road
- Grand Avenue in Duluth; the section of Grand Avenue that is marked MN 23 is from 59th Avenue West and I-35 (in West Duluth) to Idaho Street (in the Morgan Park neighborhood)
- Commonwealth Avenue in the Gary-New Duluth neighborhood of the city of Duluth
- Evergreen Memorial Highway in the Fond du Lac neighborhood of the city of Duluth

=== Parks and monuments ===
The highway serves:

- Split Rock Creek State Park in Pipestone County at Ihlen
- Pipestone National Monument
- Camden State Park in Lyon County on the banks of the Redwood River
- Banning State Park in Pine County on the banks of the Kettle River

=== Evergreen Memorial Scenic Drive ===
About 50 miles (80 km) of MN 23 that travels through Pine, Carlton, and Saint Louis counties is officially designated the Veterans Evergreen Memorial Scenic Drive. This portion is between I-35 near Askov and the Gary-New Duluth neighborhood of Duluth, near MN 39. The scenic roadway offers views of Banning State Park, the Saint Louis River valley, and nearby Jay Cooke State Park.

The 2005 Minnesota Legislature officially designated the MN 23 Bridge over the Saint Louis River at Duluth (Fond du Lac neighborhood) as the Biauswah Bridge. On June 28, 2008, this bridge was dedicated as such in honor of American Indian veterans.

=== Segment in Wisconsin ===
MN 23 has the rare distinction of being a state highway that passes through another state. At 133rd Avenue West, along the southern edge of Duluth, MN 23 crosses the Saint Louis River into Douglas County, Wisconsin, in the Town of Superior, for one-half mile (800 m) before re-entering Minnesota. On some maps, this section is designated "WISC-23", despite there being another Highway 23 in southern Wisconsin. There is no signage, however, along the highway that indicates the brief route across state lines. Nearby is the junction between MN 23 and MN 210 and Jay Cooke State Park.

=== Transit ===
Intercity bus service along the MN 23 corridor is provided along the southwestern portion of the highway between Willmar and Pipestone by Jefferson Lines.

== History ==
MN 23 was authorized November 2, 1920, from Paynesville to Mission Creek, south of Hinckley. By 1933, the highway was paved between Roscoe and Cold Spring and from St. Cloud to Mission Creek. It was extended west to Benson and east to Duluth in 1934. Various sections of the highway were paved from the 1930s through the 1950s; the entire length was paved by 1961.

The section of present-day MN 23 from its southern terminus to Marshall was originally designated MN 39 until 1940. The section between Marshall and Willmar was originally designated MN 17 until 1940. The MN 23 designation originally extended west from New London to Benson along the modern MN 9; which was also MN 17 from around 1940 to the 1960s. MN 23 originally ran through Sandstone proper to just west of Askov along the route that later became MN 123; this was redesignated c. 1946.

From 1934 to 1963, the northern terminus for MN 23 was its junction with old US 61 and US 2 in West Duluth. From 1963 to 1997, MN 23 continued farther into Duluth proper as a business route using several local arteries including Michigan Street, West 1st Street, East 2nd Street, East 3rd Street, and East Superior Street. The former northern terminus for MN 23 during this time period was at the intersection of US 61 (now MN 61) and 60th Avenue East in Duluth. In 1997, the official northern terminus changed to its junction with I-35 at Grand Avenue in Duluth.

After completion of the I-35 freeway, the state maintained MN 23 through Hinckley and Sandstone; now MN 23 runs concurrently with I-35 from Hinckley to Sandstone.

The four-lane US 71 / MN 23 bypass of Willmar was proposed in the 1960s. However a financial crisis in the early 1980s led to the northbound lanes being unpaved, and the bypass had been scaled down to a two-lane facility by the time it opened in 1985. Construction in 2001 completed the bypass to its original four-lane design.

The MN 23 expressway from Spicer to New London, and the expressway from Richmond to Waite Park (St. Cloud), were both completed by 2005.

In February 2008, a bus crash occurred on MN 23 near Cottonwood when a school bus carrying 28 students from Lakeview Public Schools was struck by a driver who ran through a stop sign which caused the bus to fall onto a pickup killing four students and injuring 17 others.

The DeSoto Bridge across the Mississippi River in St. Cloud was closed on March 20, 2008, after bent gusset plates were found in an inspection; similar to gusset plates that caused the I-35W Bridge in Minneapolis to collapse on August 1, 2007. The DeSoto Bridge was demolished in October 2008, and a new replacement bridge, the Granite City Crossing, was completed on October 29, 2009.

The Paynesville Bypass project began on April 26, 2010. The project consists of constructing a four-lane bypass around Paynesville, running from County Road 6 (CR 6) in Kandiyohi County to CR 123 in Stearns County. The project was completed in July 2012. The length of the new bypass is 7.7 miles (12.4 km). The project includes grading, construction of eight bridges, surfacing and lighting, and it cost $32.2 million (equivalent to $46.5 million in 2024).

Another project expanded MN 23 to four lanes from St. Cloud eastward to Foley, which began July 1, 2011, and finished sometime in late 2012. This project expanded an eight-mile (13 km) segment of the highway. While this section is technically part of the St. Cloud-to-I-35 portion of the corridor (and thus has less overall priority), the increase in traffic along this particular stretch led to a decision to expand the highway, as there have been major safety and mobility issues the last couple decades due to growth in the St. Cloud area.

The "Gaps" project was a multi-stage project to widen MN 23 to four lanes in the two remaining two-lane sections between Willmar and St. Cloud. The nine-mile (14 km) North Gap started expansion in May 2022, and was completed in November 2023. The 7-mile (11 km) South Gap construction began in 2023 and was completed in 2024.

== Future ==
MnDOT has designated MN 23 as a medium-priority Interregional Corridor along the majority of its length. As such, there are long-range plans to expand significant portions of the highway from two to four lanes. This resulted in the creation of the Highway 23 Coalition, and its ultimate vision for MN 23 is a four-lane expressway running from its interchange with I-90 in the southwest corner of Minnesota northeastward to its interchange with I-35 near Hinckley, although severe funding shortages are currently limiting expansion to certain segments.

Currently, the section of highway that has the highest overall priority for expansion is the corridor between Willmar and St. Cloud. This is due in part to the corridor carrying a heavy volume of traffic (higher than what a standard two-lane highway is designed to safely carry), plus a subsequently higher-than-average accident rate. In addition, southwest Minnesota lacks four-lane access to both the Twin Cities (Minneapolis–Saint Paul) and the Interstate Highway System, and a MN 23 expressway from Willmar (which is the largest municipality in west central Minnesota) to St. Cloud would greatly alleviate both these issues.

== Major intersections ==
State	County	Location	mi	km	Exit	Destinations	Notes
Minnesota	Rock	Beaver Creek Township	1.297	2.087		I-90 – Luverne, Sioux Falls; CSAH 17	Southern terminus; exit 1 on I-90; road continues south as CSAH 17
Minnesota	Pipestone	Jasper	18.686	30.072		MN 269 west (Wall Street) – State Line	Eastern terminus of MN 269
Minnesota	Pipestone	Pipestone	29.707	47.809		MN 30 west – Madison, SD	Western end of MN 30 concurrency
Minnesota	Pipestone	Pipestone	29.933	48.172		US 75 south / MN 30 east – Luverne, Slayton	Eastern end of MN 30 concurrency; western end of US 75 concurrency
Minnesota	Pipestone	Pipestone	30.550	49.165		US 75 north – Lake Benton	Eastern end of US 75 concurrency
Minnesota	Lincoln	No major junctions					
Minnesota	Lyon	Shelburne Township	52.549	84.569		US 14 – Tyler, Balaton	Interchange via connector road
Minnesota	Lyon	Coon Creek Township	59.413	95.616		MN 91 south – Lake Wilson	
Minnesota	Lyon	Marshall	73.679	118.575		US 59 – Slayton, Marshall	Access to Avera Marshall Regional Medical Center
Minnesota	Lyon	Marshall	75.057	120.793		MN 19 / MN 68 – Redwood Falls, Marshall	Access to Avera Marshall Regional Medical Center
Minnesota	Yellow Medicine	Minnesota Falls Township	100.984	162.518		MN 67 east – Wood Lake, Echo	Western end of MN 67 concurrency; formerly MN 274
Minnesota	Yellow Medicine	Granite Falls	103.151	166.005		MN 167 east – Upper Sioux Agency State Park	
Minnesota	Yellow Medicine	Granite Falls	103.364	166.348		US 212 west / MN 67 west / Minnesota River Valley Scenic Byway	Western end of US 212 concurrency; eastern end of MN 67 concurrency
Minnesota	Minnesota River	Granite Falls	103.424– 103.500	166.445– 166.567		US 212 Bridge	
Minnesota	Chippewa	Granite Falls Township	111.569	179.553		US 212 east / Minnesota River Valley Scenic Byway – Olivia	Eastern end of US 212 concurrency
Minnesota	Chippewa	Stoneham Township	125.066	201.274		MN 7 – Cosmos, Montevideo	
Minnesota	Kandiyohi	Willmar Township	141.483	227.695	—	CSAH 15 / CSAH 5	Western end of super two
Minnesota	Kandiyohi	Willmar	144.515	232.574	—	US 71 Bus. north (1st Street) / US 71 south – Willmar, Olivia	Western end of US 71 concurrency; eastern end of super two, western end of freeway; 1st St. and US 71 south are signed as separate exits westbound
Minnesota	Kandiyohi	Willmar	141.501	227.724	—	CSAH 23 (Willmar Avenue)	
Minnesota	Kandiyohi	Willmar	142.666– 142.677	229.599– 229.616	—	US 12 – Willmar, Litchfield	
Minnesota	Kandiyohi	Willmar	143.900– 143.960	231.585– 231.681	—	Civic Center Drive	
Minnesota	Kandiyohi	Willmar	144.948	233.271	—	Business 71 south – County Museum	Eastern end of freeway; westbound exit and eastbound entrance; former MN 294; serves Carris Health Rice Memorial Hospital
Minnesota	Kandiyohi	Dovre Township	145.353	233.923		US 71 north / MN 23 east / CSAH 90 east (Glacial Ridge Trail)	U-turn for southbound traffic; northbound access to Glacial Ridge Tr. west via Michigan left
Minnesota	Kandiyohi	Dovre Township	145.607	234.332		US 71 south / MN 23 west to US 71 Bus. south	U-turn for northbound traffic
Minnesota	Kandiyohi	Dovre Township	152.420	245.296		US 71 north – Sauk Centre	Interchange; eastern end of US 71 concurrency; eastbound exit and westbound entrance
Minnesota	Kandiyohi	Green Lake Township	153.253	246.637		CSAH 9	Interchange
Minnesota	Kandiyohi	New London	160.927	258.987		MN 9 west – New London	Future interchange; currently an intersection; eastern terminus of MN 9
Minnesota	Stearns	Paynesville	167.909– 168.077	270.223– 270.494		Veterans Drive	Interchange
Minnesota	Stearns	Paynesville	168.453– 168.841	271.099– 271.723		MN 4 / MN 55 – Belgrade, Paynesville	Interchange
Minnesota	Stearns	Paynesville Township				CR 85 / Business 23	Interchange; westbound exit and eastbound entrance
Minnesota	Stearns	Richmond	186.069	299.449		MN 22 south – Eden Valley	Northern terminus of MN 22
Minnesota	Stearns	St. Joseph Township	199.420	320.935		I-94 (US 52) – Alexandria, Minneapolis, St. Paul	Exits 164A-B on I-94
Minnesota	Stearns	St. Cloud	204.150	328.548		MN 15 south (Alternate route to I-94 east) / CSAH 75 east (2nd Street South east)	Southern end of MN 15/CSAH 75 concurrency
Minnesota	Stearns	St. Cloud	204.401	328.952		MN 15 north (Alternate route to I-94 east) / CSAH 75 west (Division Street west)	Northern end of MN 15/CSAH 75 concurrency; former US 52 west
Minnesota	Stearns	St. Cloud	206.480	332.297		10th Avenue	RIRO interchange; westbound exit and entrance; serves St. Cloud Hospital
Minnesota	Stearns	St. Cloud	206.638	332.552		9th Avenue	RIRO interchange; eastbound exit and entrance
Minnesota	Mississippi River	St. Cloud	207.000– 207.168	333.134– 333.405		Granite City Crossing	
Minnesota	Benton	St. Cloud	207.860	334.518		US 10 – Little Falls, St. Paul	Parclo interchange
Minnesota	Benton	Minden Township	212.403	341.829		MN 95 east – Princeton	Western terminus of MN 95
Minnesota	Benton	Gilmanton Township	220.925	355.544		MN 25 – Pierz	
Minnesota	Mille Lacs	Milaca	236.357– 236.374	380.380– 380.407		US 169 – Princeton, Onamia	Interchange
Minnesota	Kanabec	Ogilvie	247.418	398.181		MN 47 north – Isle	Western end of MN 47 concurrency
Minnesota	Kanabec	Ogilvie	248.481	399.891		MN 47 south – Anoka	Eastern end of MN 47 concurrency
Minnesota	Kanabec	Mora	254.577	409.702		MN 65 south – Cambridge	Western end of MN 65 concurrency
Minnesota	Kanabec	Mora	256.180	412.282		MN 65 north – McGregor	Eastern end of MN 65 concurrency
Minnesota	Pine	Brook Park Township	266.615	429.075		MN 107 – Braham	Northern terminus of MN 107
Minnesota	Pine	Mission Creek Township	273.500	440.156		CSAH 61 north (St. Croix Scenic Byway north) – Hinckley	Western end of CSAH 61/St. Croix Scenic Byway concurrency
Minnesota	Pine	Mission Creek Township	273.737	440.537		I-35 south (34th Infantry [Red Bull] Division Highway south) / CSAH 61 south (St. Croix Scenic Byway south) – St. Paul, Minneapolis	Eastern end of CSAH 61/St. Croix Scenic Byway concurrency; western end of I-35 concurrency; interchange; exit 180 on I-35
Minnesota	Pine	Hinckley	272.459	438.480	183	MN 48 east (Fire Monument Road) to CSAH 61 – Hinckley	Exit number follows I-35; western terminus of MN 48; access to CSAH 61 via CSAH 61 Spur (Fire Monument Road west)
Minnesota	Pine	Sandstone	285.237	459.044		I-35 north (34th Infantry [Red Bull] Division Highway north) / CSAH 61 / Old US 61 (St. Croix Scenic Byway south) – Duluth	Eastern end of I-35 concurrency; western end of St. Croix Scenic Byway concurrency; exit 191 on I-35
Minnesota	Pine	Sandstone	285.641	459.695		MN 123 east – Business District	Western terminus of MN 123
Minnesota	Pine	Finlayson Township	289.708	466.240		MN 18 west – Rutledge, Finlayson	Eastern terminus of MN 18
Minnesota	Pine	Finlayson Township	290.190	467.016		St. Croix Scenic Byway ends I-35 – Duluth, St. Paul, Minneapolis	Exit 195 on I-35; interchange; eastern terminus of St. Croix Scenic Byway; western terminus of Veterans Memorial Evergreen Scenic Byway
Minnesota	Pine	Finlayson Township	293.017	471.565		MN 123 west – Sandstone	Western terminus of MN 123
Minnesota	Carlton	No major junctions					
			335.25	539.53	Minnesota–Wisconsin line		
Wisconsin	Douglas	No major junctions					
St. Louis River			335.665– 335.793	540.200– 540.406	Biauswah Bridge; Wisconsin–Minnesota line		
Minnesota	St. Louis	Duluth	335.948	540.656		MN 210 west – Jay Cooke State Park, Carlton	Eastern terminus of MN 210
Minnesota	St. Louis	Duluth	338.725	545.125		MN 39 east (McCuen Street) – Superior WI	Western terminus of MN 39
Minnesota	St. Louis	Duluth	345.020	555.256		I-35 north (US 2 east)	Northern terminus; exit 251B on I-35
Minnesota	St. Louis	Duluth	345.020	555.256		Grand Avenue northeast to I-35 south (US 2 west)	Continuation beyond I-35 (US 2)
1.000 mi = 1.609 km; 1.000 km = 0.621 mi: Concurrency terminus; Incomplete access; Proposed; Route transition

== See also ==
- Wisconsin State Trunk Highway System
