= Wood Lake Township, Yellow Medicine County, Minnesota =

Wood Lake Township, Minnesota
- Township
- Location within the state of Minnesota Wood Lake Township, Minnesota (the United States)
- Coordinates: 44°40′16″N 95°33′22″W
- Country: United States
- State: Minnesota
- County: Yellow Medicine

Area
  - Total: 35.2 sq mi (91.1 km^{2})
  - Land: 34.3 sq mi (88.9 km^{2})
  - Water: 0.85 sq mi (2.2 km^{2})
- Elevation: 1,030 ft (314 m)

Population (2000)
  - Total: 220
  - Density: 6.5/sq mi (2.5/km^{2})
- Time zone: UTC-6 (Central (CST))
  - Summer (DST): UTC-5 (CDT)
- ZIP code: 56297
- Area code: 507
- FIPS code: 27-71464
- GNIS feature ID: 0666041

Wood Lake Township is a township in Yellow Medicine County, Minnesota, United States. The population was 220 at the 2000 census.

Wood Lake Township was organized in 1873, and named after Wood Lake.

== Geography ==
According to the United States Census Bureau, the township has a total area of 35.2 square miles (91.1 km^{2}), of which 34.3 square miles (88.9 km^{2}) is land and 0.9 square mile (2.3 km^{2}) (2.47%) is water.

== Demographics ==
As of the census of 2000, there were 220 people, 89 households, and 64 families residing in the township. The population density was 6.4 people per square mile (2.5/km^{2}). There were 94 housing units at an average density of 2.7/sq mi (1.1/km^{2}). The racial makeup of the township was 99.09% White, 0.45% Asian, and 0.45% from two or more races.

There were 89 households, out of which 28.1% had children under the age of 18 living with them, 67.4% were married couples living together, 3.4% had a female householder with no husband present, and 27.0% were non-families. 23.6% of all households were made up of individuals, and 13.5% had someone living alone who was 65 years of age or older. The average household size was 2.47 and the average family size was 2.97.

In the township the population was spread out, with 25.9% under the age of 18, 6.8% from 18 to 24, 26.8% from 25 to 44, 22.3% from 45 to 64, and 18.2% who were 65 years of age or older. The median age was 39 years. For every 100 females, there were 111.5 males. For every 100 females age 18 and over, there were 114.5 males.

The median income for a household in the township was $34,250, and the median income for a family was $42,917. Males had a median income of $26,458 versus $21,042 for females. The per capita income for the township was $15,331. About 7.2% of families and 9.5% of the population were below the poverty line, including 13.5% of those under the age of eighteen and 6.7% of those 65 or over.
