= Burr, Minnesota =

Unincorporated community in Minnesota, United States

Burr
- Unincorporated community
- Location within Minnesota Location within the United States
- Coordinates: 44°44′54″N 96°21′33″W
- Country: United States
- State: Minnesota
- County: Yellow Medicine
- Elevation: 1,325 ft (404 m)
- Time zone: UTC-6 (Central (CST))
  - Summer (DST): UTC-5 (CDT)
- Area code: 507
- GNIS feature ID: 640675

Burr is an unincorporated community in Florida Township, Yellow Medicine County, in the U.S. state of Minnesota.

== History ==
Burr was originally called Stanley, and under the latter name was platted by the railroad in 1886. The current name is for Burr Anderson, an early settler.

A post office was established in Burr in 1894; it was closed in 1953.
