= Burton Township, Yellow Medicine County, Minnesota =

Burton Township, Minnesota
- Township
- Location within the state of Minnesota Burton Township, Minnesota (the United States)
- Coordinates: 44°40′35″N 96°2′25″W
- Country: United States
- State: Minnesota
- County: Yellow Medicine

Area
  - Total: 36.0 sq mi (93.2 km^{2})
  - Land: 35.7 sq mi (92.5 km^{2})
  - Water: 0.23 sq mi (0.6 km^{2})
- Elevation: 1,135 ft (346 m)

Population (2000)
  - Total: 174
  - Density: 4.9/sq mi (1.9/km^{2})
- Time zone: UTC-6 (Central (CST))
  - Summer (DST): UTC-5 (CDT)
- FIPS code: 27-08884
- GNIS feature ID: 0663711

Burton Township is a township in Yellow Medicine County, Minnesota, United States. The population was 174 at the 2000 census.

Burton Township was organized in 1879, and named for Burton French, the father of a first settler.

== Geography ==
According to the United States Census Bureau, the township has a total area of 36.0 square miles (93 km^{2}), of which 35.7 square miles (92 km^{2}) is land and 0.2 square miles (0.52 km^{2}) (0.67%) is water.

== Demographics ==
As of the census of 2000, there were 174 people, 65 households, and 46 families residing in the township. The population density was 4.9 inhabitants per square mile (1.9/km^{2}). There were 70 housing units at an average density of 2.0 per square mile (0.77/km^{2}). The racial makeup of the township was 100.00% White.

There were 65 households, out of which 35.4% had children under the age of 18 living with them, 58.5% were married couples living together, 4.6% had a female householder with no husband present, and 29.2% were non-families. 26.2% of all households were made up of individuals, and 6.2% had someone living alone who was 65 years of age or older. The average household size was 2.68 and the average family size was 3.24.

In the township the population was spread out, with 31.6% under the age of 18, 8.6% from 18 to 24, 27.6% from 25 to 44, 16.7% from 45 to 64, and 15.5% who were 65 years of age or older. The median age was 35 years. For every 100 females, there were 126.0 males. For every 100 females age 18 and over, there were 128.8 males.

The median income for a household in the township was $34,500, and the median income for a family was $37,750. Males had a median income of $25,000 versus $20,833 for females. The per capita income for the township was $13,616. About 12.2% of families and 10.7% of the population were below the poverty line, including 10.5% of those under the age of eighteen and 13.0% of those 65 or over.
