= Sandnes Township, Yellow Medicine County, Minnesota =

Sandnes Township, Minnesota
- Township
- Location within the state of Minnesota Sandnes Township, Minnesota (the United States)
- Coordinates: 44°40′26″N 95°38′55″W
- Country: United States
- State: Minnesota
- County: Yellow Medicine

Area
  - Total: 36.1 sq mi (93.4 km^{2})
  - Land: 36.1 sq mi (93.4 km^{2})
  - Water: 0 sq mi (0.0 km^{2})
- Elevation: 1,050 ft (320 m)

Population (2000)
  - Total: 197
  - Density: 5.4/sq mi (2.1/km^{2})
- Time zone: UTC-6 (Central (CST))
  - Summer (DST): UTC-5 (CDT)
- FIPS code: 27-58378
- GNIS feature ID: 0665545

Sandnes Township is a township in Yellow Medicine County, Minnesota, United States. The population was 197 at the 2000 census.

Sandnes Township was organized in 1872, and named after Sandnes, in Norway.

== Geography ==
According to the United States Census Bureau, the township has a total area of 36.1 square miles (93.4 km^{2}), of which 36.1 square miles (93.4 km^{2}) is land and 0.03% is water.

== Demographics ==
As of the census of 2000, there were 197 people, 69 households, and 54 families residing in the township. The population density was 5.5 people per square mile (2.1/km^{2}). There were 75 housing units at an average density of 2.1/sq mi (0.8/km^{2}). The racial makeup of the township was 97.97% White, 0.51% Pacific Islander, 0.51% from other races, and 1.02% from two or more races. Hispanic or Latino of any race were 3.55% of the population.

There were 69 households, out of which 37.7% had children under the age of 18 living with them, 75.4% were married couples living together, 1.4% had a female householder with no husband present, and 21.7% were non-families. 21.7% of all households were made up of individuals, and 8.7% had someone living alone who was 65 years of age or older. The average household size was 2.86 and the average family size was 3.33.

In the township the population was spread out, with 31.5% under the age of 18, 7.1% from 18 to 24, 28.4% from 25 to 44, 22.3% from 45 to 64, and 10.7% who were 65 years of age or older. The median age was 36 years. For every 100 females, there were 111.8 males. For every 100 females age 18 and over, there were 104.5 males.

The median income for a household in the township was $45,000, and the median income for a family was $46,875. Males had a median income of $28,750 versus $20,000 for females. The per capita income for the township was $15,280. None of the families and 2.0% of the population were living below the poverty line, including no under eighteens and 7.7% of those over 64.
