= Hammer Township, Yellow Medicine County, Minnesota =

Hammer Township, Minnesota
- Township
- Location within the state of Minnesota Hammer Township, Minnesota (the United States)
- Coordinates: 44°45′16″N 96°16′14″W
- Country: United States
- State: Minnesota
- County: Yellow Medicine

Area
  - Total: 35.7 sq mi (92.4 km^{2})
  - Land: 35.7 sq mi (92.4 km^{2})
  - Water: 0 sq mi (0.0 km^{2})
- Elevation: 1,211 ft (369 m)

Population (2000)
  - Total: 233
  - Density: 6.5/sq mi (2.5/km^{2})
- Time zone: UTC-6 (Central (CST))
  - Summer (DST): UTC-5 (CDT)
- FIPS code: 27-26792
- GNIS feature ID: 0664381

Hammer Township is a township in Yellow Medicine County, Minnesota, United States. The population was 233 at the 2000 census.

== History ==
Hammer Township was organized in 1877.

== Geography ==
According to the United States Census Bureau, the township has a total area of 35.7 square miles (92 km^{2}), all land.

== Demographics ==
As of the census of 2000, there were 233 people, 86 households, and 71 families residing in the township. The population density was 6.5 inhabitants per square mile (2.5/km^{2}). There were 93 housing units at an average density of 2.6 per square mile (1.0/km^{2}). The racial makeup of the township was 100.00% White.

There were 86 households, out of which 32.6% had children under the age of 18 living with them, 70.9% were married couples living together, 10.5% had a female householder with no husband present, and 16.3% were non-families. 11.6% of all households were made up of individuals, and 7.0% had someone living alone who was 65 years of age or older. The average household size was 2.71 and the average family size was 2.94.

In the township the population was spread out, with 26.2% under the age of 18, 5.6% from 18 to 24, 25.3% from 25 to 44, 27.5% from 45 to 64, and 15.5% who were 65 years of age or older. The median age was 39 years. For every 100 females, there were 95.8 males. For every 100 females age 18 and over, there were 102.4 males.

The median income for a household in the township was $44,167, and the median income for a family was $43,750. Males had a median income of $21,250 versus $29,063 for females. The per capita income for the township was $22,013. About 9.4% of families and 12.4% of the population were below the poverty line, including 23.1% of those under the age of eighteen and 4.7% of those 65 or over.
