= Swede Prairie Township, Yellow Medicine County, Minnesota =

Swede Prairie Township, Minnesota
- Township
- Location within the state of Minnesota Swede Prairie Township, Minnesota (the United States)
- Coordinates: 44°40′54″N 95°54′54″W
- Country: United States
- State: Minnesota
- County: Yellow Medicine

Area
  - Total: 36.3 sq mi (94.1 km^{2})
  - Land: 36.3 sq mi (94.0 km^{2})
  - Water: 0 sq mi (0.0 km^{2})
- Elevation: 1,112 ft (339 m)

Population (2000)
  - Total: 162
  - Density: 4.4/sq mi (1.7/km^{2})
- Time zone: UTC-6 (Central (CST))
  - Summer (DST): UTC-5 (CDT)
- FIPS code: 27-63850
- GNIS feature ID: 0665753

Swede Prairie Township is a township in Yellow Medicine County, Minnesota, United States. The population was 162 at the 2000 census.

== History ==
Swede Prairie Township was originally called Green Prairie Township, and under the latter name was organized in 1878. A few months later, the name Swede Prairie was adopted, for the fact a large share of the early settlers were natives of Sweden.

== Geography ==
According to the United States Census Bureau, the township has a total area of 36.3 square miles (94.1 km^{2}), of which 36.3 square miles (94.0 km^{2}) is land and 0.03% is water.

== Demographics ==
As of the census of 2000, there were 162 people, 57 households, and 47 families residing in the township. The population density was 4.5 people per square mile (1.7/km^{2}). There were 65 housing units at an average density of 1.8/sq mi (0.7/km^{2}). The racial makeup of the township was 100.00% White.

There were 57 households, out of which 38.6% had children under the age of 18 living with them, 82.5% were married couples living together, and 15.8% were non-families. 15.8% of all households were made up of individuals, and 7.0% had someone living alone who was 65 years of age or older. The average household size was 2.84 and the average family size was 3.10.

In the township the population was spread out, with 30.2% under the age of 18, 5.6% from 18 to 24, 28.4% from 25 to 44, 22.2% from 45 to 64, and 13.6% who were 65 years of age or older. The median age was 37 years. For every 100 females, there were 102.5 males. For every 100 females age 18 and over, there were 109.3 males.

The median income for a household in the township was $55,250, and the median income for a family was $56,250. Males had a median income of $25,625 versus $23,125 for females. The per capita income for the township was $18,955. About 7.5% of families and 6.5% of the population were below the poverty line, including 6.5% of those under the age of eighteen and 8.7% of those 65 or over.
