= Hazel Run Township, Yellow Medicine County, Minnesota =

Hazel Run Township, Minnesota
- Township
- Location within the state of Minnesota Hazel Run Township, Minnesota (the United States)
- Coordinates: 44°45′53″N 95°40′33″W
- Country: United States
- State: Minnesota
- County: Yellow Medicine

Area
  - Total: 35.6 sq mi (92.2 km^{2})
  - Land: 35.6 sq mi (92.2 km^{2})
  - Water: 0 sq mi (0.0 km^{2})
- Elevation: 1,050 ft (320 m)

Population (2000)
  - Total: 194
  - Density: 5.4/sq mi (2.1/km^{2})
- Time zone: UTC-6 (Central (CST))
  - Summer (DST): UTC-5 (CDT)
- ZIP code: 56241
- Area code: 320
- FIPS code: 27-28034
- GNIS feature ID: 0664431

Hazel Run Township is a township in Yellow Medicine County, Minnesota, United States. The population was 194 at the 2000 census.

Hazel Run Township was organized in 1877.

== Geography ==
According to the United States Census Bureau, the township has a total area of 35.6 square miles (92 km^{2}), all land.

== Demographics ==
As of the census of 2000, there were 194 people, 72 households, and 55 families residing in the township. The population density was 5.4 inhabitants per square mile (2.1/km^{2}). There were 78 housing units at an average density of 2.2 per square mile (0.85/km^{2}). The racial makeup of the township was 95.36% White, 1.03% Native American, 3.61% from other races. Hispanic or Latino of any race were 4.12% of the population.

There were 72 households, out of which 43.1% had children under the age of 18 living with them, 70.8% were married couples living together, 2.8% had a female householder with no husband present, and 23.6% were non-families. 22.2% of all households were made up of individuals, and 12.5% had someone living alone who was 65 years of age or older. The average household size was 2.69 and the average family size was 3.11.

In the township the population was spread out, with 30.4% under the age of 18, 4.6% from 18 to 24, 29.9% from 25 to 44, 17.5% from 45 to 64, and 17.5% who were 65 years of age or older. The median age was 37 years. For every 100 females, there were 96.0 males. For every 100 females age 18 and over, there were 98.5 males.

The median income for a household in the township was $46,406, and the median income for a family was $47,188. Males had a median income of $28,750 versus $20,625 for females. The per capita income for the township was $20,053. About 6.2% of families and 8.5% of the population were below the poverty line, including 13.6% of those under the age of eighteen and none of those 65 or over.
