= New Avon Township, Redwood County, Minnesota =

New Avon Township, Minnesota
- Township
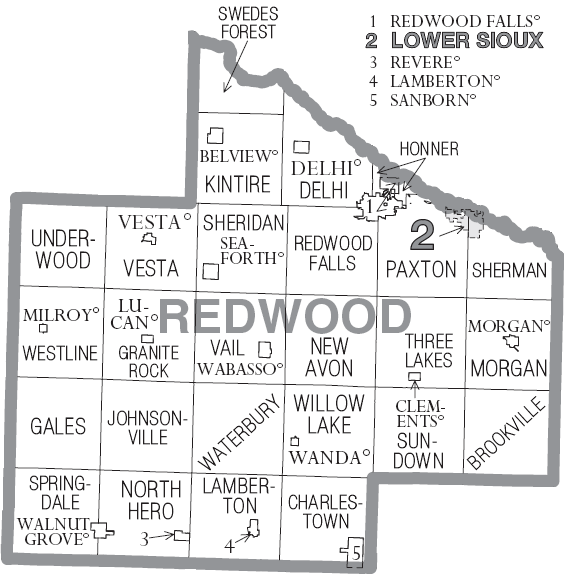
- Cities and townships of Redwood County
- Coordinates: 44°25′0″N 95°9′28″W
- Country: United States
- State: Minnesota
- County: Redwood

Area
  - Total: 36.0 sq mi (93.2 km^{2})
  - Land: 36.0 sq mi (93.2 km^{2})
  - Water: 0 sq mi (0.0 km^{2})
- Elevation: 1,060 ft (323 m)

Population (2000)
  - Total: 242
  - Density: 6.7/sq mi (2.6/km^{2})
- Time zone: UTC-6 (Central (CST))
  - Summer (DST): UTC-5 (CDT)
- FIPS code: 27-45412
- GNIS feature ID: 0665089

New Avon Township is one of the twenty-six townships of Redwood County, Minnesota. The population was 242 at the time of the 2000 census.

New Avon Township was organized in 1872, and named after Avon, Maine.

== Geography ==
According to the United States Census Bureau, the township has a total area of 36.0 square miles (93.2 km^{2}), all land.

No municipalities are located in New Avon Township.

== Demographics ==
As of the census of 2000, there were 242 people, 89 households, and 70 families residing in the township. The population density was 6.7 people per square mile (2.6/km^{2}). There were 96 housing units at an average density of 2.7/sq mi (1.0/km^{2}). The racial makeup of the township was 100.00% White.

There were 89 households, out of which 38.2% had children under the age of 18 living with them, 71.9% were married couples living together, 4.5% had a female householder with no husband present, and 21.3% were non-families. 19.1% of all households were made up of individuals, and 5.6% had someone living alone who was 65 years of age or older. The average household size was 2.72 and the average family size was 3.11.

In the township the population was spread out, with 27.7% under the age of 18, 7.0% from 18 to 24, 27.3% from 25 to 44, 26.0% from 45 to 64, and 12.0% who were 65 years of age or older. The median age was 38 years. For every 100 females, there were 128.3 males. For every 100 females age 18 and over, there were 113.4 males.

The median income for a household in the township was $45,250, and the median income for a family was $51,250. Males had a median income of $31,000 versus $21,023 for females. The per capita income for the township was $17,437. About 5.0% of families and 5.5% of the population were below the poverty line, including 2.5% of those under the age of eighteen and 6.7% of those 65 or over.
