= Tyro Township, Yellow Medicine County, Minnesota =

Tyro Township, Minnesota
- Township
- Location within the state of Minnesota Tyro Township, Minnesota (the United States)
- Coordinates: 44°45′11″N 95°55′2″W
- Country: United States
- State: Minnesota
- County: Yellow Medicine

Area
  - Total: 36.3 sq mi (94.1 km^{2})
  - Land: 36.3 sq mi (94.0 km^{2})
  - Water: 0.039 sq mi (0.1 km^{2})
- Elevation: 1,073 ft (327 m)

Population (2000)
  - Total: 208
  - Density: 5.7/sq mi (2.2/km^{2})
- Time zone: UTC-6 (Central (CST))
  - Summer (DST): UTC-5 (CDT)
- FIPS code: 27-66082
- GNIS feature ID: 0665832

Tyro Township is a township in Yellow Medicine County, Minnesota, United States. The population was 208 at the 2000 census.

== History ==
Tyro Township was founded in 1879. It was named from the English word tyro, which also means "beginner" or "novice".

== Geography ==
According to the United States Census Bureau, the township has a total area of 36.3 square miles (94.1 km^{2}), of which 36.3 square miles (94.0 km^{2}) is land and 0.04 square mile (0.1 km^{2}) (0.06%) is water.

== Demographics ==
As of the census of 2000, there were 208 people, 77 households, and 60 families residing in the township. The population density was 5.7 people per square mile (2.2/km^{2}). There were 84 housing units at an average density of 2.3/sq mi (0.9/km^{2}). The racial makeup of the township was 100.00% White.

There were 77 households, out of which 32.5% had children under the age of 18 living with them, 72.7% were married couples living together, and 20.8% were non-families. 16.9% of all households were made up of individuals, and 2.6% had someone living alone who was 65 years of age or older. The average household size was 2.70 and the average family size was 3.08.

In the township the population was spread out, with 27.9% under the age of 18, 4.3% from 18 to 24, 26.0% from 25 to 44, 24.0% from 45 to 64, and 17.8% who were 65 years of age or older. The median age was 39 years. For every 100 females, there were 114.4 males. For every 100 females age 18 and over, there were 123.9 males.

The median income for a household in the township was $40,909, and the median income for a family was $41,932. Males had a median income of $26,563 versus $16,500 for females. The per capita income for the township was $16,897. None of the families and 3.6% of the population were living below the poverty line, including no under eighteens and 6.9% of those over 64.
