= Posen Township, Yellow Medicine County, Minnesota =

Posen Township, Minnesota
- Township
- Location within the state of Minnesota Posen Township, Minnesota (the United States)
- Coordinates: 44°35′25″N 95°32′2″W
- Country: United States
- State: Minnesota
- County: Yellow Medicine

Area
  - Total: 36.1 sq mi (93.5 km^{2})
  - Land: 35.1 sq mi (91.0 km^{2})
  - Water: 0.97 sq mi (2.5 km^{2})
- Elevation: 1,063 ft (324 m)

Population (2000)
  - Total: 234
  - Density: 6.7/sq mi (2.6/km^{2})
- Time zone: UTC-6 (Central (CST))
  - Summer (DST): UTC-5 (CDT)
- FIPS code: 27-52180
- GNIS feature ID: 0665346

Posen Township is a township in Yellow Medicine County, Minnesota, United States. The population was 234 at the 2000 census.

Posen Township was organized in 1879, and named after Poznań (German: Posen), which was part of Germany at that time, today it is in Poland.

== Geography ==
According to the United States Census Bureau, the township has a total area of 36.1 square miles (93.5 km^{2}), of which 35.1 square miles (91.0 km^{2}) is land and 1.0 square mile (2.5 km^{2}) (2.69%) is water.

== Demographics ==
As of the census of 2000, there were 234 people, 87 households, and 74 families residing in the township. The population density was 6.7 people per square mile (2.6/km^{2}). There were 90 housing units at an average density of 2.6/sq mi (1.0/km^{2}). The racial makeup of the township was 98.72% White, 0.43% Asian, and 0.85% from two or more races.

There were 87 households, out of which 33.3% had children under the age of 18 living with them, 78.2% were married couples living together, 3.4% had a female householder with no husband present, and 14.9% were non-families. 12.6% of all households were made up of individuals, and 4.6% had someone living alone who was 65 years of age or older. The average household size was 2.69 and the average family size was 2.89.

In the township the population was spread out, with 26.5% under the age of 18, 6.0% from 18 to 24, 26.9% from 25 to 44, 23.9% from 45 to 64, and 16.7% who were 65 years of age or older. The median age was 39 years. For every 100 females, there were 96.6 males. For every 100 females age 18 and over, there were 102.4 males.

The median income for a household in the township was $40,313, and the median income for a family was $41,563. Males had a median income of $35,625 versus $20,750 for females. The per capita income for the township was $20,132. About 7.1% of families and 8.7% of the population were below the poverty line, including 15.5% of those under the age of eighteen and none of those 65 or over.
