= Wergeland Township, Yellow Medicine County, Minnesota =

Wergeland Township, Minnesota
- Township
- Location within the state of Minnesota Wergeland Township, Minnesota (the United States)
- Coordinates: 44°40′2″N 96°9′50″W
- Country: United States
- State: Minnesota
- County: Yellow Medicine

Area
  - Total: 33.9 sq mi (87.8 km^{2})
  - Land: 33.9 sq mi (87.8 km^{2})
  - Water: 0 sq mi (0.0 km^{2})
- Elevation: 1,161 ft (354 m)

Population (2000)
  - Total: 201
  - Density: 6.0/sq mi (2.3/km^{2})
- Time zone: UTC-6 (Central (CST))
  - Summer (DST): UTC-5 (CDT)
- FIPS code: 27-69160
- GNIS feature ID: 0665953

Wergeland Township is a township in Yellow Medicine County, Minnesota, United States. The population was 201 at the 2000 census.

== History ==
Wergeland Township was originally called Union Township, and under the latter name was organized in 1879. Less than one month later, the name Wergeland was adopted, after Henrik Wergeland, a Norwegian writer, playwright, historian and linguist.

== Geography ==
According to the United States Census Bureau, the township has a total area of 33.9 square miles (87.8 km^{2}), all land.

== Demographics ==
As of the census of 2000, there were 201 people, 72 households, and 58 families residing in the township. The population density was 5.9 people per square mile (2.3/km^{2}). There were 74 housing units at an average density of 2.2/sq mi (0.8/km^{2}). The racial makeup of the township was 99.50% White, and 0.50% from two or more races.

There were 72 households, out of which 41.7% had children under the age of 18 living with them, 75.0% were married couples living together, 2.8% had a female householder with no husband present, and 19.4% were non-families. 16.7% of all households were made up of individuals, and 4.2% had someone living alone who was 65 years of age or older. The average household size was 2.79 and the average family size was 3.16.

In the township the population was spread out, with 28.4% under the age of 18, 7.0% from 18 to 24, 27.4% from 25 to 44, 26.4% from 45 to 64, and 10.9% who were 65 years of age or older. The median age was 38 years. For every 100 females, there were 113.8 males. For every 100 females age 18 and over, there were 111.8 males.

The median income for a household in the township was $43,250, and the median income for a family was $46,071. Males had a median income of $29,583 versus $18,250 for females. The per capita income for the township was $15,341. About 5.4% of families and 6.8% of the population were below the poverty line, including 8.1% of those under the age of eighteen and none of those 65 or over.
