= Lisbon Township, Yellow Medicine County, Minnesota =

Lisbon Township, Minnesota
- Township
- Location within the state of Minnesota Lisbon Township, Minnesota (the United States)
- Coordinates: 44°51′8″N 95°47′52″W
- Country: United States
- State: Minnesota
- County: Yellow Medicine

Area
  - Total: 35.7 sq mi (92.5 km^{2})
  - Land: 35.7 sq mi (92.5 km^{2})
  - Water: 0.039 sq mi (0.1 km^{2})
- Elevation: 1,040 ft (317 m)

Population (2000)
  - Total: 217
  - Density: 6.0/sq mi (2.3/km^{2})
- Time zone: UTC-6 (Central (CST))
  - Summer (DST): UTC-5 (CDT)
- FIPS code: 27-37394
- GNIS feature ID: 0664794

Lisbon Township is a township in Yellow Medicine County, Minnesota, United States. The population was 217 at the 2000 census.

Lisbon Township was organized in 1873.

== Geography ==
According to the United States Census Bureau, the township has a total area of 35.7 square miles (92.5 km^{2}), of which 35.7 square miles (92.5 km^{2}) is land and 0.04 square mile (0.1 km^{2}) (0.08%) is water.

== Demographics ==
As of the census of 2000, there were 217 people, 82 households, and 61 families residing in the township. The population density was 6.1 inhabitants per square mile (2.4/km^{2}). There were 84 housing units at an average density of 2.4 per square mile (0.93/km^{2}). The racial makeup of the township was 100.00% White.

There were 82 households, out of which 34.1% had children under the age of 18 living with them, 68.3% were married couples living together, 1.2% had a female householder with no husband present, and 25.6% were non-families. 24.4% of all households were made up of individuals, and 6.1% had someone living alone who was 65 years of age or older. The average household size was 2.65 and the average family size was 3.20.

In the township the population was spread out, with 30.0% under the age of 18, 4.6% from 18 to 24, 27.2% from 25 to 44, 27.2% from 45 to 64, and 11.1% who were 65 years of age or older. The median age was 37 years. For every 100 females, there were 130.9 males. For every 100 females age 18 and over, there were 137.5 males.

The median income for a household in the township was $33,500, and the median income for a family was $40,000. Males had a median income of $27,813 versus $23,125 for females. The per capita income for the township was $15,221. About 3.4% of families and 8.5% of the population were below the poverty line, including none of those under the age of eighteen and 12.9% of those 65 or over.
