= Friendship Township, Yellow Medicine County, Minnesota =

Friendship Township, Minnesota
- Township
- Location within the state of Minnesota Friendship Township, Minnesota (the United States)
- Coordinates: 44°45′38″N 95°47′0″W
- Country: United States
- State: Minnesota
- County: Yellow Medicine

Area
  - Total: 35.2 sq mi (91.2 km^{2})
  - Land: 35.1 sq mi (90.9 km^{2})
  - Water: 0.12 sq mi (0.3 km^{2})
- Elevation: 1,053 ft (321 m)

Population (2000)
  - Total: 258
  - Density: 7.3/sq mi (2.8/km^{2})
- Time zone: UTC-6 (Central (CST))
  - Summer (DST): UTC-5 (CDT)
- FIPS code: 27-22832
- GNIS feature ID: 0664234

Friendship Township is a township in Yellow Medicine County, Minnesota, United States. The population was 258 at the 2000 census.

== History ==
Friendship Township was organized in 1879.

== Geography ==
According to the United States Census Bureau, the township has a total area of 35.2 square miles (91 km^{2}), of which 35.1 square miles (91 km^{2}) is land and 0.1 square miles (0.26 km^{2}) (0.31%) is water.

== Demographics ==
As of the census of 2000, there were 258 people, 91 households, and 75 families residing in the township. The population density was 7.4 inhabitants per square mile (2.9/km^{2}). There were 100 housing units at an average density of 2.8 per square mile (1.1/km^{2}). The racial makeup of the township was 97.67% White, and 2.33% from other races. Hispanic or Latino of any race were 2.71% of the population.

There were 91 households, out of which 42.9% had children under the age of 18 living with them, 80.2% were married couples living together, 1.1% had a female householder with no husband present, and 16.5% were non-families. 15.4% of all households were made up of individuals, and 6.6% had someone living alone who was 65 years of age or older. The average household size was 2.84 and the average family size was 3.17.

In the township the population was spread out, with 32.2% under the age of 18, 5.8% from 18 to 24, 22.9% from 25 to 44, 28.3% from 45 to 64, and 10.9% who were 65 years of age or older. The median age was 40 years. For every 100 females, there were 118.6 males. For every 100 females age 18 and over, there were 103.5 males.

The median income for a household in the township was $42,404, and the median income for a family was $46,250. Males had a median income of $32,500 versus $18,393 for females. The per capita income for the township was $18,718. About 2.4% of families and 3.0% of the population were below the poverty line, including none of those under the age of eighteen and 18.2% of those 65 or over.
