= Wood Lake (Yellow Medicine County, Minnesota) =

Lake in the state of Minnesota, United States

- Location within Minnesota Location within the United States
- Location: Yellow Medicine County, Minnesota
- Coordinates: 44°41′11″N 95°31′49″W
- Basin countries: United States

Wood Lake is a lake near the town of Wood Lake, Minnesota in Yellow Medicine County. The lake was named for the dense woods originally bordering the lake.
