= Fortier Township, Yellow Medicine County, Minnesota =

Fortier Township, Minnesota
- Township
- Location within the state of Minnesota Fortier Township, Minnesota (the United States)
- Coordinates: 44°40′24″N 96°23′20″W
- Country: United States
- State: Minnesota
- County: Yellow Medicine

Area
  - Total: 33.5 sq mi (86.7 km^{2})
  - Land: 33.4 sq mi (86.5 km^{2})
  - Water: 0.12 sq mi (0.3 km^{2})
- Elevation: 1,594 ft (486 m)

Population (2000)
  - Total: 116
  - Density: 3.4/sq mi (1.3/km^{2})
- Time zone: UTC-6 (Central (CST))
  - Summer (DST): UTC-5 (CDT)
- FIPS code: 27-21914
- GNIS feature ID: 0664199

Fortier Township is a township in Yellow Medicine County, Minnesota, United States. The population was 116 at the 2000 census.

Fortier Township was established in 1881, and named after Joseph Fortier, a pioneer merchant.

== Geography ==
According to the United States Census Bureau, the township has a total area of 33.5 square miles (87 km^{2}), of which 33.4 square miles (87 km^{2}) is land and 0.1 square miles (0.26 km^{2}) (0.30%) is water.

== Demographics ==
As of the census of 2000, there were 116 people, 45 households, and 34 families residing in the township. The population density was 3.5 people per square mile (1.3/km^{2}). There were 58 housing units at an average density of 1.7/sq mi (0.7/km^{2}). The racial makeup of the township was 100.00% White.

There were 45 households, out of which 35.6% had children under the age of 18 living with them, 66.7% were married couples living together, 2.2% had a female householder with no husband present, and 24.4% were non-families. 17.8% of all households were made up of individuals, and 4.4% had someone living alone who was 65 years of age or older. The average household size was 2.58 and the average family size was 2.94.

In the township, the population had 28.4% under the age of 18, 10.3% from 18 to 24, 19.8% from 25 to 44, 25.9% from 45 to 64, and 15.5% who were 65 years of age or older. The median age was 39 years. For every 100 females, there were 100 males. For every 100 females age 18 and over, there were 112.8 males.

The median income for a household in the township was $32,500, and the median income for a family was $43,750. Males had a median income of $16,250 versus $26,250 for females. The per capita income for the township was $20,984. There were 16.1% of families and 15.8% of the population living below the poverty line, including 28.6% of under eighteens and 10.5% of those over 64.
