= Stony Run Township, Yellow Medicine County, Minnesota =

Stony Run Township, Minnesota
- Township
- Location within the state of Minnesota Stony Run Township, Minnesota (the United States)
- Coordinates: 44°50′30″N 95°39′20″W
- Country: United States
- State: Minnesota
- County: Yellow Medicine

Area
  - Total: 41.2 sq mi (106.7 km^{2})
  - Land: 40.8 sq mi (105.8 km^{2})
  - Water: 0.35 sq mi (0.9 km^{2})
- Elevation: 1,030 ft (314 m)

Population (2000)
  - Total: 544
  - Density: 13/sq mi (5.1/km^{2})
- Time zone: UTC-6 (Central (CST))
  - Summer (DST): UTC-5 (CDT)
- FIPS code: 27-63004
- GNIS feature ID: 0665721

Stony Run Township is a township in Yellow Medicine County, Minnesota, United States. The population was 544 at the 2000 census.

Stony Run Township was organized in 1871, and named after Stony Run Creek.

== Geography ==
According to the United States Census Bureau, the township has a total area of 41.2 square miles (106.8 km^{2}), of which 40.9 square miles (105.8 km^{2}) is land and 0.4 square mile (0.9 km^{2}) (0.87%) is water.

== Demographics ==
As of the census of 2000, there were 544 people, 188 households, and 152 families residing in the township. The population density was 13.3 people per square mile (5.1/km^{2}). There were 204 housing units at an average density of 5.0/sq mi (1.9/km^{2}). The racial makeup of the township was 95.59% White, 0.37% African American, 1.10% Native American, 1.29% Asian, 0.55% from other races, and 1.10% from two or more races. Hispanic or Latino of any race were 2.94% of the population.

There were 188 households, out of which 39.4% had children under the age of 18 living with them, 73.9% were married couples living together, 4.3% had a female householder with no husband present, and 19.1% were non-families. 14.4% of all households were made up of individuals, and 5.9% had someone living alone who was 65 years of age or older. The average household size was 2.79 and the average family size was 3.09.

In the township the population was spread out, with 30.1% under the age of 18, 5.7% from 18 to 24, 23.2% from 25 to 44, 29.4% from 45 to 64, and 11.6% who were 65 years of age or older. The median age was 40 years. For every 100 females, there were 110.0 males. For every 100 females age 18 and over, there were 115.9 males.

The median income for a household in the township was $45,469, and the median income for a family was $48,125. Males had a median income of $32,188 versus $21,250 for females. The per capita income for the township was $19,010. About 2.6% of families and 9.7% of the population were below the poverty line, including 6.6% of those under age 18 and 6.5% of those age 65 or over.
