= Yellow Medicine County, Minnesota =

County in Minnesota, United States

- County
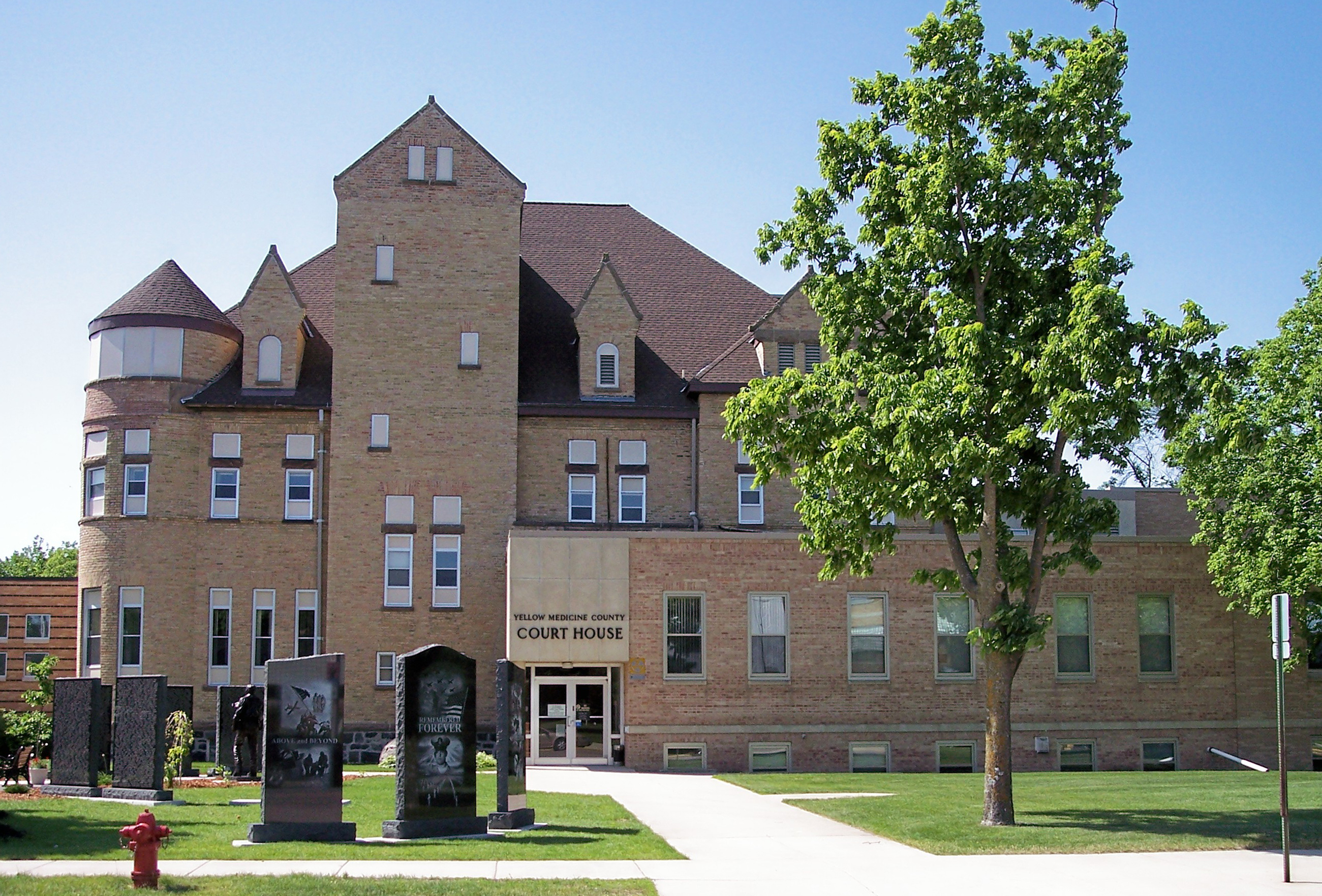
- Yellow Medicine County Courthouse in Granite Falls in 2007

- Location within the U.S. state of Minnesota
- Coordinates: 44°43′N 95°52′W
- Country: United States
- State: Minnesota
- Founded: March 6, 1871
- Named for: Yellow Medicine River
- Seat: Granite Falls
- Largest city: Granite Falls

Area
  - Total: 763 sq mi (1,980 km^{2})
  - Land: 759 sq mi (1,970 km^{2})
  - Water: 4.1 sq mi (11 km^{2}) 0.5%

Population (2020)
  - Total: 9,528
  - Estimate (2025): 9,477 ▼
  - Density: 12.6/sq mi (4.9/km^{2})
- Time zone: UTC−6 (Central)
  - Summer (DST): UTC−5 (CDT)
- Congressional district: 7th
- Website: www.co.ym.mn.gov

Yellow Medicine County is a county in the southwestern part of the U.S. state of Minnesota. Its eastern border is formed by the Minnesota River. As of the 2020 census, the population was 9,528. Its county seat is Granite Falls.

The Upper Sioux Indian Reservation, related to the historical Yellow Medicine Agency that was here, is entirely within the county. It was established under the Treaty of Traverse des Sioux in 1851, by which the Dakota ceded much territory in the region to the United States.

== History ==
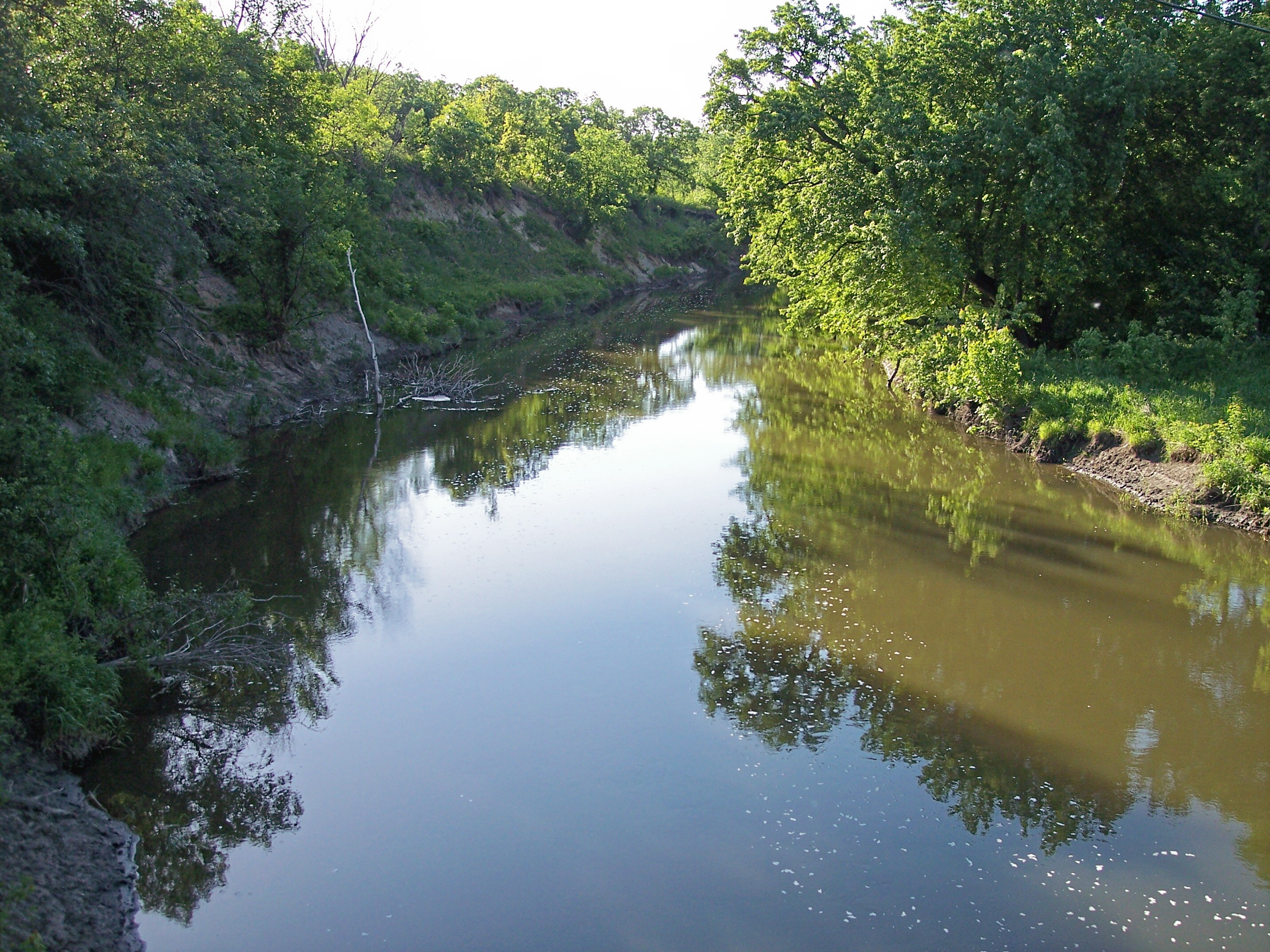
Yellow Medicine River

The county was established by the Minnesota legislature on March 6, 1871, with Granite Falls as the county seat. Its name comes from the Yellow Medicine River, which runs through the eastern part of the county to the Minnesota. The river's name derives from the moonseed plant, Menispermum canadense, whose yellow root the native Dakota people used for medicinal purposes.

It was proposed in 1878 to create a new county, taken from the western portions of Yellow Medicine, Lincoln, and Lac qui Parle counties. The state legislature approved the petition (subject to local voter approval), and Governor Pillsbury signed the act on February 27, 1879, but the proposal failed to garner a combined majority of votes in the three counties, and the proposed Canby County did not come into being.

== Geography ==
Yellow Medicine County lies on the west side of Minnesota. Its west border abuts the state of South Dakota. The Minnesota River flows east-southeast along the county's northeast side on its way to discharge into the Mississippi River. The Yellow Medicine River flows northeast through the eastern part of the county, discharging into the Minnesota near the midpoint of the county's eastern border. The Stony Run Creek flows east through the northeast part of the county; the Florida Creek flows northeast through the west end of the county, and the Lac qui Parle River also flows northeast through the west central part of the county. The county terrain consists of rolling hills, carved by drainages. The area is devoted to agriculture. The terrain slopes to the east and slightly to the north; its highest point is on the west border, near its SW corner, at 1,732 ft (528 m) ASL. The county has an area of 763 square miles (1,980 km^{2}), of which 759 square miles (1,970 km^{2}) is land and 4.1 square miles (11 km^{2}) (0.5%) is water.

Soils of Yellow Medicine County

=== Lakes ===
- Burton Lake
- Culver Lake (part)
- Curtis Lake
- Highbank Lake
- Kvistid Lake
- Lake Louie
- Lone Tree Lake
- Miedd Lake
- Miller Lake
- Mud Lake
- Spellman Lake
- Timm Lake
- Tyson Lake
- Wood Lake

=== Rivers and drainages ===
- Florida Creek
- Lac qui Parle River
- Minnesota River
- Spring Creek
- Stony Run Creek
- Yellow Medicine River

=== Major highways ===
- U.S. Highway 59
- U.S. Highway 75
- U.S. Highway 212
- Minnesota State Highway 23
- Minnesota State Highway 67
- Minnesota State Highway 68
- Minnesota State Highway 167
- Minnesota State Highway 274 (decommissioned in 2022)

=== Adjacent counties ===
- Lac qui Parle County - north
- Chippewa County - northeast
- Renville County - east
- Redwood County - southeast
- Lyon County - south
- Lincoln County - southwest
- Deuel County, South Dakota - west

=== Protected areas ===
- Bigrock State Wildlife Management Area
- Christopherson State Wildlife Management Area
- Clawson State Wildlife Management Area
- Flinks State Wildlife Management Area
- Miller-Richter State Wildlife Management Area
- Mound Springs Prairie Scientific and Natural Area
- Omro State Wildlife Management Area
- Oshkosh State Wildlife Management Area
- Penthole State Wildlife Management Area
- Posen State Wildlife Management Area
- Saint Leo State Wildlife Management Area
- Sioux Nation State Wildlife Management Area
- Stokke State Wildlife Management Area
- Stony Run State Wildlife Management Area
- Swedes Forest Scientific and Natural Area (part)
- Upper Sioux Agency State Park

== Demographics ==
Historical population
Census	Pop.	Note	%±
1880	5,884		—
1890	9,854		67.5%
1900	14,602		48.2%
1910	15,406		5.5%
1920	16,550		7.4%
1930	16,625		0.5%
1940	16,917		1.8%
1950	16,279		−3.8%
1960	15,523		−4.6%
1970	14,418		−7.1%
1980	13,653		−5.3%
1990	11,684		−14.4%
2000	11,080		−5.2%
2010	10,438		−5.8%
2020	9,528		−8.7%
2025 (est.)	9,477	▼	−0.5%
U.S. Decennial Census; 1790-1960 1900-1990; 1990-2000 2010-2020

=== Racial and ethnic composition ===
Yellow Medicine County, Minnesota – Racial and ethnic composition Note: the US Census treats Hispanic/Latino as an ethnic category. This table excludes Latinos from the racial categories and assigns them to a separate category. Hispanics/Latinos may be of any race.
Race / Ethnicity (NH = Non-Hispanic)	Pop 1980	Pop 1990	Pop 2000	Pop 2010	Pop 2020	% 1980	% 1990	% 2000	% 2010	% 2020
White alone (NH)	13,458	11,465	10,569	9,581	8,408	98.57%	98.13%	95.39%	91.79%	88.25%
Black or African American alone (NH)	0	3	9	15	48	0.00%	0.03%	0.08%	0.14%	0.50%
Native American or Alaska Native alone (NH)	96	114	224	301	276	0.70%	0.98%	2.02%	2.88%	2.90%
Asian alone (NH)	30	19	18	30	28	0.22%	0.16%	0.16%	0.29%	0.29%
Native Hawaiian or Pacific Islander alone (NH)	x	x	1	2	1	x	x	0.01%	0.02%	0.01%
Other race alone (NH)	5	1	2	8	4	0.04%	0.01%	0.02%	0.08%	0.04%
Mixed race or Multiracial (NH)	x	x	62	104	315	x	x	0.56%	1.00%	3.31%
Hispanic or Latino (any race)	64	82	195	397	448	0.47%	0.70%	1.76%	3.80%	4.70%
Total	13,653	11,684	11,080	10,438	9,528	100.00%	100.00%	100.00%	100.00%	100.00%

=== 2020 census ===
As of the 2020 census, the county had a population of 9,528. The median age was 42.9 years. 22.9% of residents were under the age of 18 and 21.3% of residents were 65 years of age or older. For every 100 females there were 101.1 males, and for every 100 females age 18 and over there were 101.5 males age 18 and over.

The racial makeup of the county was 89.5% White, 0.6% Black or African American, 3.1% American Indian and Alaska Native, 0.3% Asian, <0.1% Native Hawaiian and Pacific Islander, 2.1% from some other race, and 4.5% from two or more races. Hispanic or Latino residents of any race comprised 4.7% of the population.

<0.1% of residents lived in urban areas, while 100.0% lived in rural areas.

There were 4,040 households in the county, of which 26.8% had children under the age of 18 living in them. Of all households, 51.8% were married-couple households, 19.9% were households with a male householder and no spouse or partner present, and 21.0% were households with a female householder and no spouse or partner present. About 30.4% of all households were made up of individuals and 14.3% had someone living alone who was 65 years of age or older.

There were 4,513 housing units, of which 10.5% were vacant. Among occupied housing units, 80.7% were owner-occupied and 19.3% were renter-occupied. The homeowner vacancy rate was 1.8% and the rental vacancy rate was 13.3%.

=== 2000 census ===
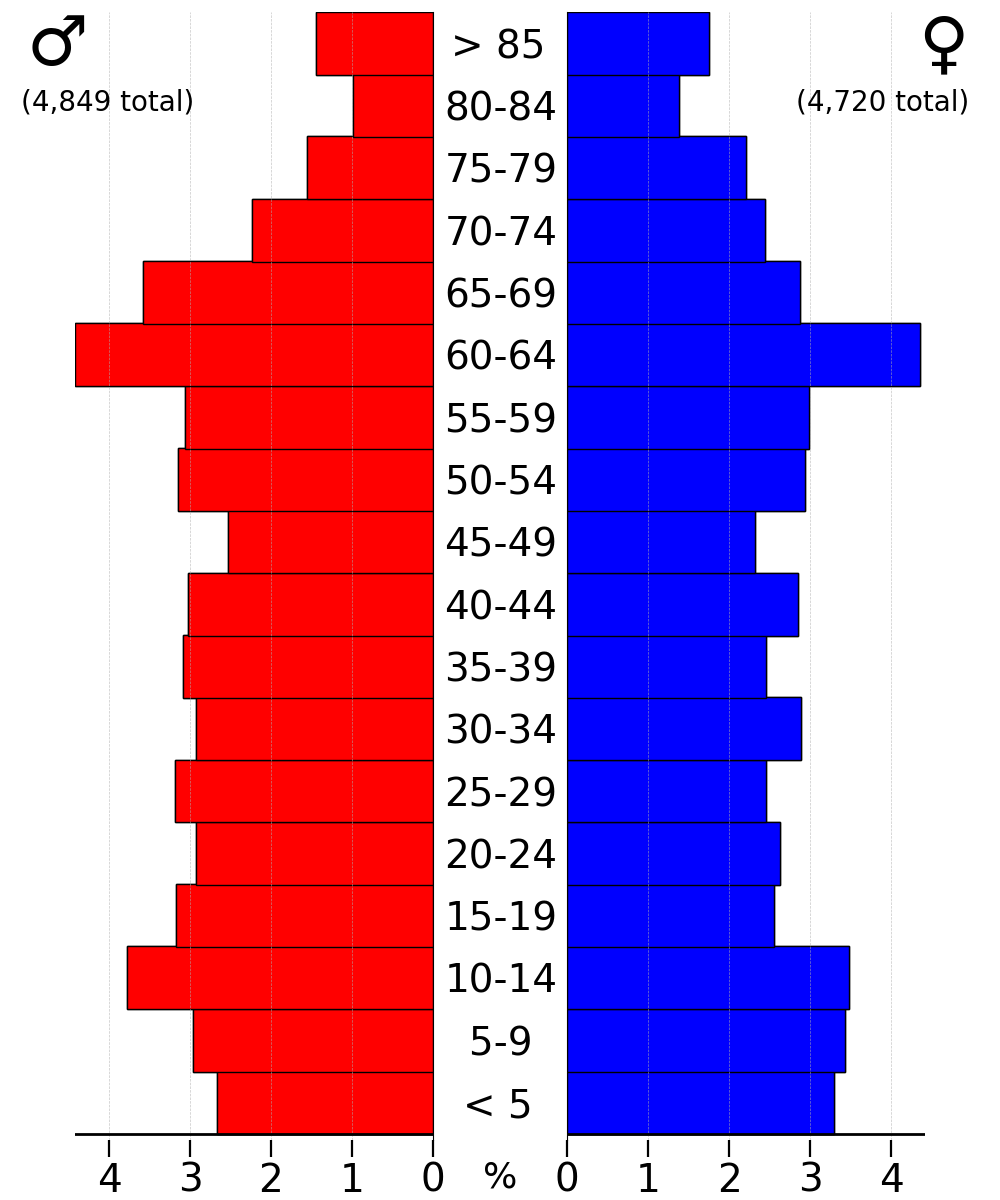
2022 US Census population pyramid for Yellow Medicine County, from ACS 5-year estimates

As of the census of 2000, there were 11,080 people, 4,439 households, and 2,974 families in the county. The population density was 14.6 per square mile (5.6/km^{2}). There were 4,873 housing units at an average density of 6.42 per square mile (2.48/km^{2}). The racial makeup of the county was 96.09% White, 0.11% Black or African American, 2.04% Native American, 0.17% Asian, 0.01% Pacific Islander, 0.92% from other races, and 0.66% from two or more races. 1.76% of the population were Hispanic or Latino of any race. 36.5% were of Norwegian and 34.6% German ancestry.

There were 4,439 households, out of which 30.30% had children under the age of 18 living with them, 58.60% were married couples living together, 5.70% had a female householder with no husband present, and 33.00% were non-families. 29.30% of all households were made up of individuals, and 15.20% had someone living alone who was 65 years of age or older. The average household size was 2.42 and the average family size was 3.01.

The county population contained 25.80% under the age of 18, 7.40% from 18 to 24, 24.20% from 25 to 44, 22.20% from 45 to 64, and 20.50% who were 65 years of age or older. The median age was 40 years. For every 100 females there were 98.20 males. For every 100 females age 18 and over, there were 94.90 males age 18 and over.

The median income for a household in the county was $34,393, and the median income for a family was $42,002. Males had a median income of $27,770 versus $20,870 for females. The per capita income for the county was $17,120. About 7.10% of families and 10.40% of the population were below the poverty line, including 10.40% of those under age 18 and 10.60% of those age 65 or over.

== Communities ==
=== Cities ===
- Canby
- Clarkfield
- Echo
- Granite Falls (county seat; partly in Chippewa County)
- Hanley Falls
- Hazel Run
- Porter
- St. Leo
- Wood Lake

=== Unincorporated communities ===
- Burr (original name Stanley)
- Lorne
- Normania
- Spring Creek

=== Townships ===
- Burton Township
- Echo Township
- Florida Township
- Fortier Township
- Friendship Township
- Hammer Township
- Hazel Run Township
- Lisbon Township
- Minnesota Falls Township
- Norman Township
- Normania Township
- Omro Township
- Oshkosh Township
- Posen Township
- Sandnes Township
- Sioux Agency Township
- Stony Run Township
- Swede Prairie Township
- Tyro Township
- Wergeland Township
- Wood Lake Township

== Government and politics ==
Yellow Medicine County has recently been a swing county in national elections. Since 1980, the county has selected the Republican Party candidate in 56% of national elections (as of 2020). The county gave a majority to Barack Obama in 2008, but has trended more Republican in recent cycles.

United States presidential election results for Yellow Medicine County, Minnesota
Year	Republican		Democratic		Third party(ies)	
Year	No.	%	No.	%	No.	%
1892	911	49.11%	364	19.62%	580	31.27%
1896	1,578	58.92%	1,015	37.90%	85	3.17%
1900	1,743	65.95%	763	28.87%	137	5.18%
1904	1,947	83.42%	258	11.05%	129	5.53%
1908	1,745	65.06%	786	29.31%	151	5.63%
1912	352	14.24%	737	29.81%	1,383	55.95%
1916	1,501	50.08%	1,238	41.31%	258	8.61%
1920	4,225	72.48%	814	13.96%	790	13.55%
1924	2,278	38.70%	151	2.56%	3,458	58.74%
1928	3,302	52.96%	2,861	45.89%	72	1.15%
1932	1,739	27.01%	4,580	71.14%	119	1.85%
1936	2,029	30.38%	3,921	58.71%	729	10.91%
1940	3,964	50.89%	3,786	48.61%	39	0.50%
1944	3,337	50.68%	3,214	48.81%	34	0.52%
1948	2,693	38.41%	4,164	59.38%	155	2.21%
1952	4,322	57.73%	3,143	41.99%	21	0.28%
1956	3,594	51.21%	3,416	48.67%	8	0.11%
1960	3,800	50.84%	3,649	48.82%	26	0.35%
1964	2,751	36.86%	4,707	63.06%	6	0.08%
1968	3,060	43.34%	3,587	50.81%	413	5.85%
1972	3,683	50.32%	3,462	47.30%	174	2.38%
1976	2,946	39.48%	4,337	58.12%	179	2.40%
1980	4,004	53.95%	2,833	38.18%	584	7.87%
1984	3,819	55.22%	3,018	43.64%	79	1.14%
1988	2,925	46.59%	3,282	52.28%	71	1.13%
1992	1,909	30.83%	2,593	41.87%	1,691	27.31%
1996	2,006	35.67%	2,741	48.74%	877	15.59%
2000	2,598	47.11%	2,528	45.84%	389	7.05%
2004	2,878	49.98%	2,799	48.61%	81	1.41%
2008	2,579	46.31%	2,816	50.57%	174	3.12%
2012	2,806	51.83%	2,465	45.53%	143	2.64%
2016	3,382	64.10%	1,524	28.89%	370	7.01%
2020	3,734	67.55%	1,688	30.54%	106	1.92%
2024	3,738	69.09%	1,548	28.61%	124	2.29%

County Board of Commissioners
Position	Name	District
Commissioner	Greg Renneke	District 1
Commissioner	John Berends	District 2
Commissioner	Mitch Kling	District 3
Commissioner	Ron Antony	District 4
Commissioner	Glen Kack	District 5

State Legislature (2018-2020)
Position	Name	Affiliation	District
Senate	Gary Dahms	Republican	District 16
House of Representatives	Chris Swedzinski	Republican	District 16A

U.S Congress (2018-2020)
Position	Name	Affiliation	District
House of Representatives	Michelle Fischbach	Republican	7th
Senate	Amy Klobuchar	Democratic	N/A
Senate	Tina Smith	Democratic	N/A

== See also ==
- National Register of Historic Places listings in Yellow Medicine County, Minnesota
