= Omro Township, Yellow Medicine County, Minnesota =

Omro Township, Minnesota
- Township
- Location within the state of Minnesota Omro Township, Minnesota (the United States)
- Coordinates: 44°45′26″N 96°2′11″W
- Country: United States
- State: Minnesota
- County: Yellow Medicine

Area
  - Total: 36.3 sq mi (94.0 km^{2})
  - Land: 36.0 sq mi (93.2 km^{2})
  - Water: 0.35 sq mi (0.9 km^{2})
- Elevation: 1,096 ft (334 m)

Population (2000)
  - Total: 184
  - Density: 5.2/sq mi (2/km^{2})
- Time zone: UTC-6 (Central (CST))
  - Summer (DST): UTC-5 (CDT)
- FIPS code: 27-48292
- GNIS feature ID: 0665208

Omro Township is a township in Yellow Medicine County, Minnesota, United States. The population was 184 at the 2000 census.

Omro Township was organized in 1880, and named after Omro, Wisconsin, the native home of an early settler.

== Geography ==
According to the United States Census Bureau, the township has a total area of 36.3 square miles (94.0 km^{2}), of which 36.0 square miles (93.2 km^{2}) is land and 0.3 square mile (0.9 km^{2}) (0.94%) is water.

== Demographics ==
As of the census of 2000, there were 184 people, 60 households, and 43 families residing in the township. The population density was 5.1 people per square mile (2.0/km^{2}). There were 66 housing units at an average density of 1.8/sq mi (0.7/km^{2}). The racial makeup of the township was 100.00% White. Hispanic or Latino of any race were 0.54% of the population.

There were 60 households, out of which 46.7% had children under the age of 18 living with them, 66.7% were married couples living together, 5.0% had a female householder with no husband present, and 26.7% were non-families. 23.3% of all households were made up of individuals, and 13.3% had someone living alone who was 65 years of age or older. The average household size was 3.07 and the average family size was 3.73.

In the township the population was spread out, with 37.0% under the age of 18, 8.2% from 18 to 24, 28.8% from 25 to 44, 15.8% from 45 to 64, and 10.3% who were 65 years of age or older. The median age was 31 years. For every 100 females, there were 97.8 males. For every 100 females age 18 and over, there were 107.1 males.

The median income for a household in the township was $29,375, and the median income for a family was $32,500. Males had a median income of $15,938 versus $16,250 for females. The per capita income for the township was $11,647. About 17.3% of families and 15.8% of the population were below the poverty line, including 19.7% of those under the age of eighteen and none of those 65 or over.
