= Norman Township, Yellow Medicine County, Minnesota =

Norman Township, Minnesota
- Township
- Location within the state of Minnesota Norman Township, Minnesota (the United States)
- Coordinates: 44°41′N 96°17′W
- Country: United States
- State: Minnesota
- County: Yellow Medicine

Area
  - Total: 34.9 sq mi (90.5 km^{2})
  - Land: 34.9 sq mi (90.4 km^{2})
  - Water: 0.039 sq mi (0.1 km^{2})
- Elevation: 1,342 ft (409 m)

Population (2000)
  - Total: 291
  - Density: 8.3/sq mi (3.2/km^{2})
- Time zone: UTC-6 (Central (CST))
  - Summer (DST): UTC-5 (CDT)
- FIPS code: 27-46636
- GNIS feature ID: 0665139

Norman Township is a township (T114N R45W) in Yellow Medicine County, Minnesota, United States. The population was 291 at the 2000 census.

Norman Township was organized in 1874, and named for the Norwegians, or Normans, who settled in this area.

== Geography ==
According to the United States Census Bureau, the township has a total area of 35.0 square miles (90.5 km^{2}), of which 34.9 square miles (90.4 km^{2}) is land and 0.04 square mile (0.1 km^{2}) (0.11%) is water. Norman Township includes most of the city of Canby.

== Demographics ==
As of the census of 2000, there were 291 people, 105 households, and 84 families residing in the township. The population density was 8.3 people per square mile (3.2/km^{2}). There were 113 housing units at an average density of 3.2/sq mi (1.3/km^{2}). The racial makeup of the township was 97.94% White, 2.06% from other races. Hispanic or Latino of any race were 2.06% of the population.

There were 105 households, out of which 37.1% had children under the age of 18 living with them, 74.3% were married couples living together, 1.0% had a female householder with no husband present, and 20.0% were non-families. 20.0% of all households were made up of individuals, and 8.6% had someone living alone who was 65 years of age or older. The average household size was 2.77 and the average family size was 3.19.

In the township the population was spread out, with 29.6% under the age of 18, 5.8% from 18 to 24, 27.5% from 25 to 44, 24.1% from 45 to 64, and 13.1% who were 65 years of age or older. The median age was 39 years. For every 100 females, there were 103.5 males. For every 100 females age 18 and over, there were 113.5 males.

The median income for a household in the township was $43,333, and the median income for a family was $45,000. Males had a median income of $31,071 versus $21,500 for females. The per capita income for the township was $16,936. About 2.3% of families and 2.1% of the population were below the poverty line, including none of those under the age of eighteen and 9.1% of those 65 or over.
