= Sioux Agency Township, Yellow Medicine County, Minnesota =

Sioux Agency Township, Minnesota
- Township
- Location within the state of Minnesota Sioux Agency Township, Minnesota (the United States)
- Coordinates: 44°40′47″N 95°25′56″W
- Country: United States
- State: Minnesota
- County: Yellow Medicine

Area
  - Total: 42.1 sq mi (109.1 km^{2})
  - Land: 41.5 sq mi (107.6 km^{2})
  - Water: 0.58 sq mi (1.5 km^{2})
- Elevation: 1,040 ft (317 m)

Population (2000)
  - Total: 237
  - Density: 5.7/sq mi (2.2/km^{2})
- Time zone: UTC-6 (Central (CST))
  - Summer (DST): UTC-5 (CDT)
- FIPS code: 27-60538
- GNIS feature ID: 0665621

Sioux Agency Township is a township in Yellow Medicine County, Minnesota, United States. The population was 237 at the 2000 census.

== History ==
Sioux Agency Township was originally called Yellow Medicine Township, and under the latter name was organized in 1866. The present name, adopted in 1877, was given on account of the Sioux Indian agency being located there.

== Geography ==
According to the United States Census Bureau, the township has a total area of 42.1 square miles (109.1 km^{2}), of which 41.5 square miles (107.6 km^{2}) is land and 0.6 square mile (1.5 km^{2}) (1.35%) is water.

== Demographics ==
As of the census of 2000, there were 237 people, 95 households, and 70 families residing in the township. The population density was 5.7 people per square mile (2.2/km^{2}). There were 112 housing units at an average density of 2.7/sq mi (1.0/km^{2}). The racial makeup of the township was 93.67% White, 0.84% Native American, 4.22% from other races, and 1.27% from two or more races. Hispanic or Latino of any race were 5.06% of the population.

There were 95 households, out of which 28.4% had children under the age of 18 living with them, 71.6% were married couples living together, 2.1% had a female householder with no husband present, and 25.3% were non-families. 20.0% of all households were made up of individuals, and 12.6% had someone living alone who was 65 years of age or older. The average household size was 2.49 and the average family size was 2.93.

In the township the population was spread out, with 25.3% under the age of 18, 4.6% from 18 to 24, 27.8% from 25 to 44, 26.6% from 45 to 64, and 15.6% who were 65 years of age or older. The median age was 40 years. For every 100 females, there were 121.5 males. For every 100 females age 18 and over, there were 108.2 males.

The median income for a household in the township was $40,139, and the median income for a family was $43,750. Males had a median income of $28,750 versus $19,643 for females. The per capita income for the township was $19,641. About 2.8% of families and 4.7% of the population were below the poverty line, including 12.1% of those under the age of eighteen and none of those 65 or over.
