= Echo Township, Yellow Medicine County, Minnesota =

Echo Township, Minnesota
- Township
- Location within the state of Minnesota Echo Township, Minnesota (the United States)
- Coordinates: 44°34′40″N 95°24′40″W
- Country: United States
- State: Minnesota
- County: Yellow Medicine

Area
  - Total: 35.4 sq mi (91.8 km^{2})
  - Land: 34.9 sq mi (90.3 km^{2})
  - Water: 0.58 sq mi (1.5 km^{2})
- Elevation: 1,066 ft (325 m)

Population (2000)
  - Total: 179
  - Density: 5.2/sq mi (2/km^{2})
- Time zone: UTC-6 (Central (CST))
  - Summer (DST): UTC-5 (CDT)
- ZIP code: 56237
- Area code: 507
- FIPS code: 27-17918
- GNIS feature ID: 0664037

Echo Township is a township in Yellow Medicine County, Minnesota, United States. The population was 179 at the 2000 census.

== History ==
Echo Township was originally called Empire Township, and under the latter name was organized in 1874. That same year, the name was changed to Rose Township, and in 1874, the name was changed again to Echo Township.

== Geography ==
According to the United States Census Bureau, the township has a total area of 35.4 square miles (92 km^{2}), of which 34.9 square miles (90 km^{2}) is land and 0.6 square miles (1.6 km^{2}) (1.61%) is water.

== Demographics ==
As of the census of 2000, there were 179 people, 69 households, and 56 families residing in the township. The population density was 5.1 inhabitants per square mile (2.0/km^{2}). There were 78 housing units at an average density of 2.2 per square mile (0.85/km^{2}). The racial makeup of the township was 97.77% White, 1.68% Native American, and 0.56% from two or more races.

There were 69 households, out of which 33.3% had children under the age of 18 living with them, 72.5% were married couples living together, 2.9% had a female householder with no husband present, and 17.4% were non-families. 14.5% of all households were made up of individuals, and 4.3% had someone living alone who was 65 years of age or older. The average household size was 2.59 and the average family size was 2.84.

In the township the population was spread out, with 26.8% under the age of 18, 2.8% from 18 to 24, 27.9% from 25 to 44, 30.7% from 45 to 64, and 11.7% who were 65 years of age or older. The median age was 41 years. For every 100 females, there were 115.7 males. For every 100 females age 18 and over, there were 118.3 males.

The median income for a household in the township was $42,750, and the median income for a family was $43,000. Males had a median income of $28,000 versus $22,500 for females. The per capita income for the township was $16,671. About 10.6% of families and 12.2% of the population were below the poverty line, including none of those under the age of eighteen and 11.8% of those 65 or over.
