= Oshkosh Township, Yellow Medicine County, Minnesota =

Oshkosh Township, Minnesota
- Township
- Location within the state of Minnesota Oshkosh Township, Minnesota (the United States)
- Coordinates: 44°46′5″N 96°9′1″W
- Country: United States
- State: Minnesota
- County: Yellow Medicine

Area
  - Total: 36.3 sq mi (94.0 km^{2})
  - Land: 36.3 sq mi (94.0 km^{2})
  - Water: 0 sq mi (0.0 km^{2})
- Elevation: 1,132 ft (345 m)

Population (2000)
  - Total: 249
  - Density: 6.7/sq mi (2.6/km^{2})
- Time zone: UTC-6 (Central (CST))
  - Summer (DST): UTC-5 (CDT)
- FIPS code: 27-48940
- GNIS feature ID: 0665230

Oshkosh Township is a township in Yellow Medicine County, Minnesota, United States. The population was 249 at the 2000 census.

Oshkosh Township was organized in 1879, and named after Oshkosh, Wisconsin.

== Geography ==
According to the United States Census Bureau, the township has a total area of 36.3 square miles (94.0 km^{2}), all land.

== Demographics ==
As of the census of 2000, there were 249 people, 83 households, and 66 families residing in the township. The population density was 6.9 people per square mile (2.6/km^{2}). There were 88 housing units at an average density of 2.4/sq mi (0.9/km^{2}). The racial makeup of the township was 96.39% White, 0.40% African American, 0.80% Asian, 1.20% from other races, and 1.20% from two or more races. Hispanic or Latino of any race were 1.20% of the population.

There were 83 households, out of which 42.2% had children under the age of 18 living with them, 75.9% were married couples living together, 3.6% had a female householder with no husband present, and 19.3% were non-families. 14.5% of all households were made up of individuals, and 6.0% had someone living alone who was 65 years of age or older. The average household size was 3.00 and the average family size was 3.31.

In the township the population was spread out, with 33.7% under the age of 18, 8.4% from 18 to 24, 26.1% from 25 to 44, 20.9% from 45 to 64, and 10.8% who were 65 years of age or older. The median age was 33 years. For every 100 females, there were 126.4 males. For every 100 females age 18 and over, there were 111.5 males.

The median income for a household in the township was $43,750, and the median income for a family was $46,667. Males had a median income of $27,083 versus $20,556 for females. The per capita income for the township was $14,263. About 6.8% of families and 10.4% of the population were below the poverty line, including 16.9% of those under the age of eighteen and none of those 65 or over.
