= Granite Falls, Minnesota =

City in Minnesota, United States

Granite Falls
- City
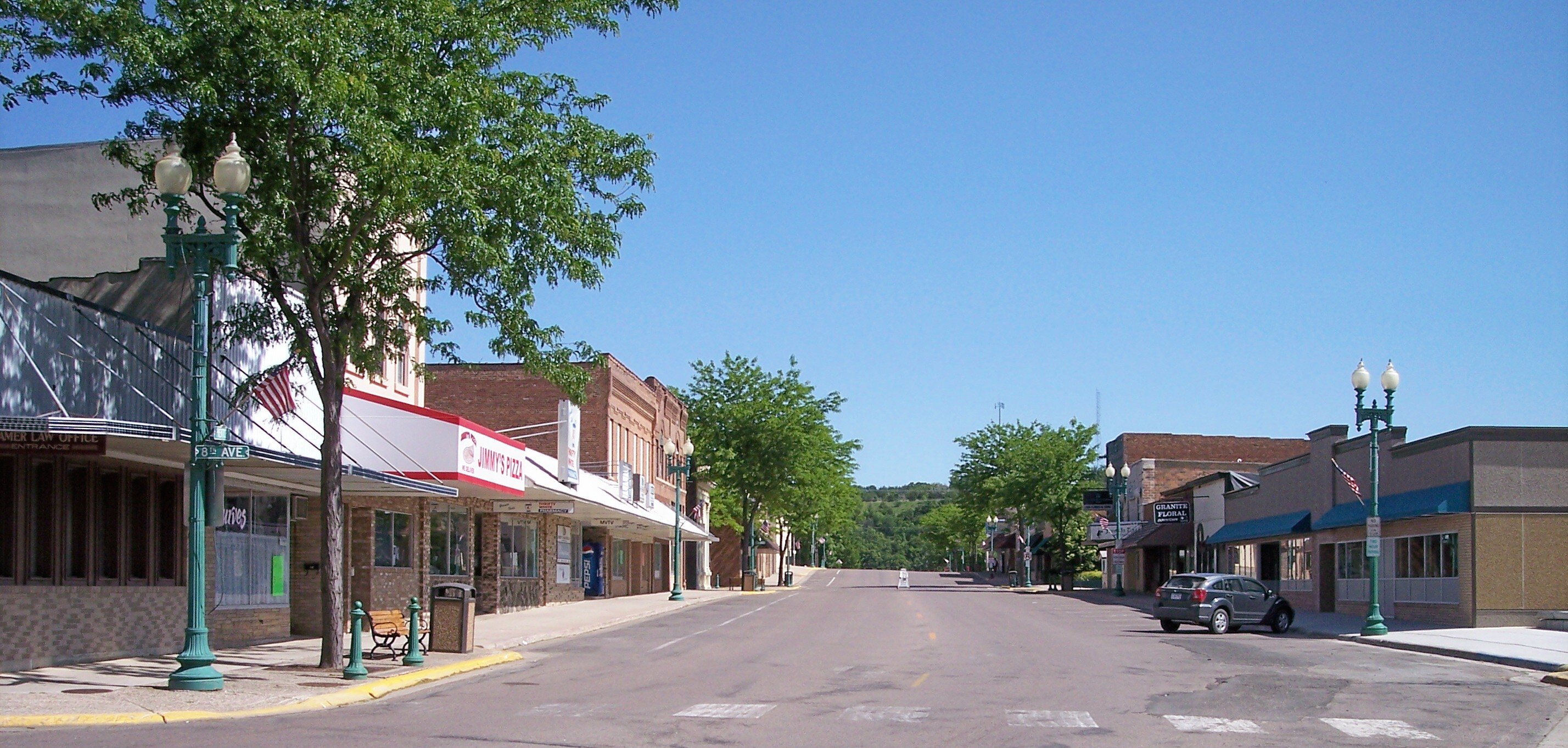
- Prentice Street in downtown Granite Falls

- Location of Granite Falls within Yellow Medicine County, Minnesota
- Coordinates: 44°48′38″N 95°32′17″W
- Country: United States
- State: Minnesota
- Counties: Chippewa, Yellow Medicine
- village: 1879
- incorporated: April 24, 1889

Government
  - Mayor: Steve Nordaune

Area
  - Total: 3.73 sq mi (9.66 km^{2})
  - Land: 3.49 sq mi (9.05 km^{2})
  - Water: 0.24 sq mi (0.61 km^{2})
- Elevation: 906 ft (276 m)

Population (2020)
  - Total: 2,737
  - Estimate (2021): 2,713
  - Density: 783.4/sq mi (302.48/km^{2})
- Time zone: UTC-6 (CST)
  - Summer (DST): UTC-5 (CDT)
- ZIP code: 56241
- Area code: 320
- FIPS code: 27-25280
- GNIS feature ID: 2394962
- Website: granitefalls.com

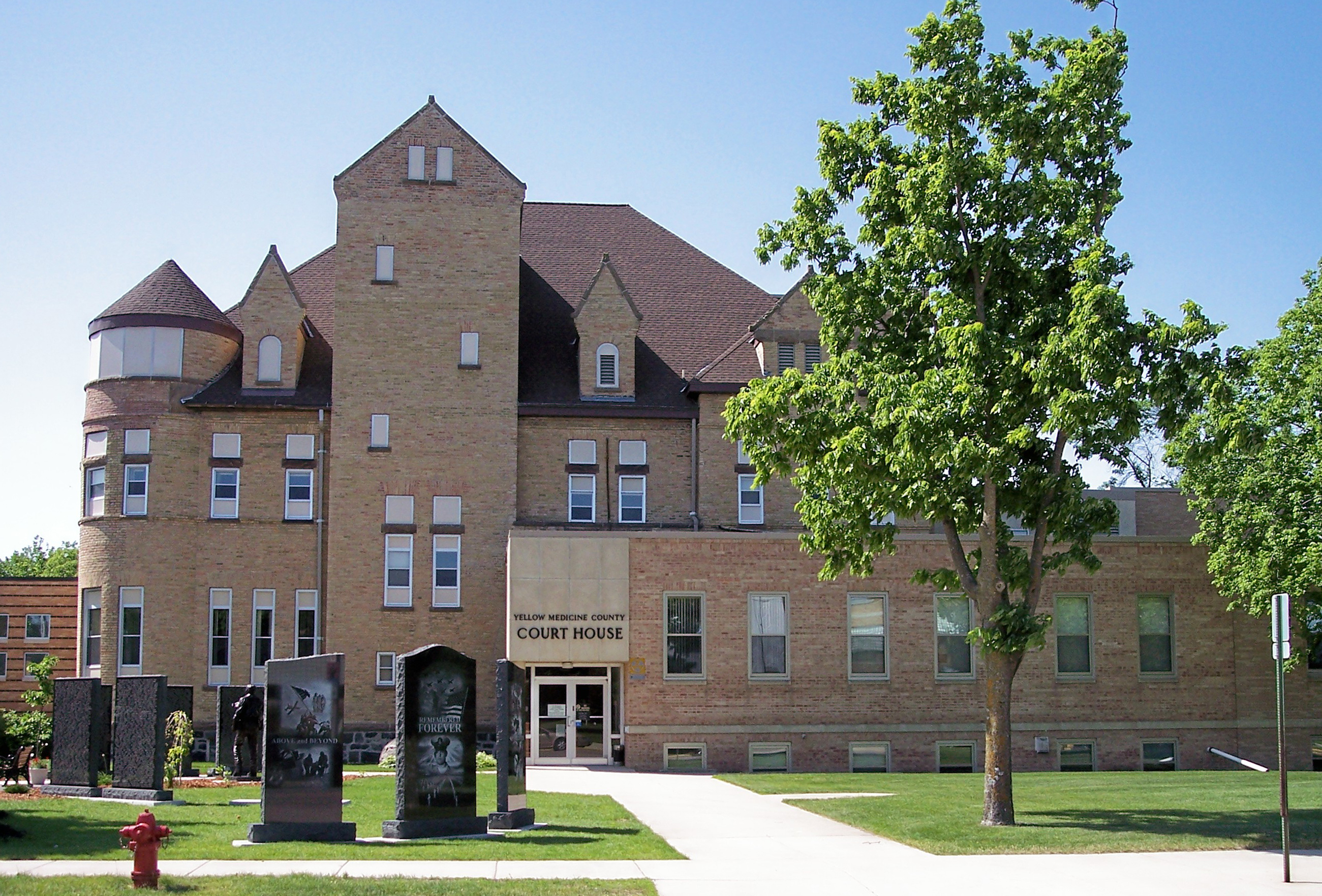
Yellow Medicine County Courthouse

Granite Falls is a city located mostly in Yellow Medicine County, Minnesota, of which it is the county seat with a small portion in Chippewa County, Minnesota. The population was 2,737 at the 2020 census. The Andrew John Volstead House, a National Historic Landmark (NHL), is located in Granite Falls. Another NHL located in Granite Falls is the Julian A. Weaver House.

== History ==
In 1870 a post office began operating at Granite Falls. The town was platted in 1872 and named for deposits of granite rock in the area. In 1874 the county seat was moved to Granite Falls and a small one courtroom courthouse was erected. In 1876 the Norwegian Evangelical Lutheran Congregation was formed and a church was built. Granite Falls was incorporated as a city in 1879 with East Granite Falls joining in 1889. The existing county courthouse was erected in 1880. In 1888 the Chicago, Milwaukee and St. Paul Railroad built the town train station that still stands. The rail line remains active as a short line operated by the Twin Cities and Western Railroad (TC&W).

A grain elevator was built along the rail lines that today exists as the Farmers Co-Op elevator. In 2005 Granite Falls Energy LLC began producing Corn ethanol and extract Corn oil at their newly constructed plant.

=== 2000 tornado ===
On July 25, 2000, the city of Granite Falls and Yellow Medicine County were hit by a powerful tornado. The tornado first touched down in rural parts of the county west-northwest of Granite Falls, hitting the city at 6:10 pm. After tearing through the residential sections of town, the tornado lifted at approximately 6:25PM after being on the ground for over nine miles. One person was killed, more than a dozen were injured, and the town and surrounding area suffered millions of dollars in property damage. Most of the damage in Granite Falls was rated F2 and F3, but the extent of the damage at the corner of 9th Avenue and 14th Street caused the National Weather Service to classify it as an F4 tornado.

== Geography ==
According to the United States Census Bureau, the city has a total area of 3.82 square miles (9.89 km^{2}), of which 3.59 square miles (9.30 km^{2}) is land and 0.23 square miles (0.60 km^{2}) is water.

U.S. Highway 212 and Minnesota State Highways 23 and 67 are three of the main routes in the city.

=== Climate ===
Granite Falls, along with the rest of Minnesota, has a humid continental climate with significant differences between seasons. With a July mean temperature of 22.2 °C (72.0 °F) Granite Falls just falls into the hot-summer zone of the Köppen classification of the humid continental climate regime. Winters are cold and dry influenced by arctic air masses affecting it through its continental position, while summers are influenced by humid subtropical air masses bringing hot temperatures and significant rainfall. Transitional periods are very short, since only April and October are between 0 °C (32 °F) and 10 °C (50 °F) in daily mean temperatures, with May–September being clearly above and November–March averaging below freezing. The middle three months in each of those cycles are also clearly warmer and colder, respectively, than the months at the beginning or at the end of transitional periods. That is in turn a typical feature of continental climates.

Climate data for Granite Falls, Minnesota, 1991–2020 normals, extremes 1893–present
Month	Jan	Feb	Mar	Apr	May	Jun	Jul	Aug	Sep	Oct	Nov	Dec	Year
Record high °F (°C)	62 (17)	66 (19)	83 (28)	94 (34)	99 (37)	104 (40)	104 (40)	102 (39)	105 (41)	97 (36)	84 (29)	59 (15)	105 (41)
Mean maximum °F (°C)	45.3 (7.4)	46.7 (8.2)	66.9 (19.4)	82.6 (28.1)	92.8 (33.8)	94.2 (34.6)	95.4 (35.2)	93.4 (34.1)	91.4 (33.0)	82.6 (28.1)	66.6 (19.2)	48.2 (9.0)	98.2 (36.8)
Mean daily maximum °F (°C)	24.1 (−4.4)	29.0 (−1.7)	42.0 (5.6)	57.4 (14.1)	70.9 (21.6)	80.2 (26.8)	85.0 (29.4)	81.9 (27.7)	75.1 (23.9)	59.7 (15.4)	42.8 (6.0)	28.6 (−1.9)	56.4 (13.5)
Daily mean °F (°C)	13.4 (−10.3)	17.8 (−7.9)	30.8 (−0.7)	45.2 (7.3)	58.0 (14.4)	67.8 (19.9)	72.4 (22.4)	69.7 (20.9)	61.6 (16.4)	47.5 (8.6)	32.5 (0.3)	19.2 (−7.1)	44.7 (7.0)
Mean daily minimum °F (°C)	2.7 (−16.3)	6.6 (−14.1)	19.7 (−6.8)	32.9 (0.5)	45.1 (7.3)	55.3 (12.9)	59.8 (15.4)	57.5 (14.2)	48.0 (8.9)	35.4 (1.9)	22.3 (−5.4)	9.7 (−12.4)	32.9 (0.5)
Mean minimum °F (°C)	−22.9 (−30.5)	−16.6 (−27.0)	−8.2 (−22.3)	16.2 (−8.8)	30.3 (−0.9)	43.6 (6.4)	49.0 (9.4)	45.6 (7.6)	33.5 (0.8)	19.3 (−7.1)	2.9 (−16.2)	−15.4 (−26.3)	−25.1 (−31.7)
Record low °F (°C)	−36 (−38)	−33 (−36)	−22 (−30)	−1 (−18)	25 (−4)	34 (1)	36 (2)	34 (1)	20 (−7)	6 (−14)	−16 (−27)	−32 (−36)	−36 (−38)
Average precipitation inches (mm)	0.81 (21)	0.83 (21)	1.47 (37)	2.41 (61)	3.50 (89)	4.56 (116)	3.27 (83)	3.81 (97)	3.18 (81)	2.35 (60)	1.37 (35)	1.08 (27)	28.64 (728)
Average snowfall inches (cm)	9.4 (24)	11.7 (30)	7.9 (20)	3.9 (9.9)	0.1 (0.25)	0.0 (0.0)	0.0 (0.0)	0.0 (0.0)	0.0 (0.0)	0.8 (2.0)	6.6 (17)	11.1 (28)	51.5 (131.15)
Average precipitation days (≥ 0.01 in)	5.9	5.3	5.9	7.3	9.4	10.4	7.9	7.7	7.3	7.3	4.6	5.5	84.5
Average snowy days (≥ 0.1 in)	6.0	4.7	3.4	1.4	0.1	0.0	0.0	0.0	0.0	0.5	2.8	5.3	24.2
Source 1: NOAA
Source 2: National Weather Service

== Demographics ==
Historical population
Census	Pop.	Note	%±
1880	578		—
1890	800		38.4%
1900	1,214		51.8%
1910	1,454		19.8%
1920	1,611		10.8%
1930	1,791		11.2%
1940	2,388		33.3%
1950	2,511		5.2%
1960	2,728		8.6%
1970	3,225		18.2%
1980	3,451		7.0%
1990	3,083		−10.7%
2000	3,070		−0.4%
2010	2,897		−5.6%
2020	2,737		−5.5%
2021 (est.)	2,713		−0.9%
U.S. Decennial Census; 2020 Census

Historical population
Census	Pop.	Note	%±
1880	174		—
2020	2,737		—
U.S. Census for East Granite Falls

=== 2020 census ===
As of the 2020 census, Granite Falls had a population of 2,737. The median age was 44.4 years. 19.8% of residents were under the age of 18 and 23.2% of residents were 65 years of age or older. For every 100 females there were 92.9 males, and for every 100 females age 18 and over there were 92.0 males age 18 and over.

0.0% of residents lived in urban areas, while 100.0% lived in rural areas.

There were 1,262 households in Granite Falls, of which 21.6% had children under the age of 18 living in them. Of all households, 38.7% were married-couple households, 21.9% were households with a male householder and no spouse or partner present, and 30.5% were households with a female householder and no spouse or partner present. About 39.7% of all households were made up of individuals and 17.8% had someone living alone who was 65 years of age or older.

There were 1,392 housing units, of which 9.3% were vacant. The homeowner vacancy rate was 2.1% and the rental vacancy rate was 11.8%.

Racial composition as of the 2020 census
Race	Number	Percent
White	2,259	82.5%
Black or African American	38	1.4%
American Indian and Alaska Native	207	7.6%
Asian	4	0.1%
Native Hawaiian and Other Pacific Islander	0	0.0%
Some other race	58	2.1%
Two or more races	171	6.2%
Hispanic or Latino (of any race)	157	5.7%

=== 2010 census ===
As of the census of 2010, there were 2,897 people in 1,282 households, including 747 families, in the city. The population density was 807.0 inhabitants per square mile (311.6/km^{2}). There were 1,417 housing units at an average density of 394.7 per square mile (152.4/km^{2}). The racial makup of the city was 89.9% White, 0.6% African American, 5.2% Native American, 0.4% Asian, 1.8% from other races, and 2.1% from two or more races. Hispanic or Latino of any race were 4.7%.

Of the 1,282 households 25.7% had children under the age of 18 living with them, 44.1% were married couples living together, 10.1% had a female householder with no husband present, 4.1% had a male householder with no wife present, and 41.7% were non-families. 37.2% of households were one person and 17.2% were one person aged 65 or older. The average household size was 2.17 and the average family size was 2.82.

The median age was 43 years. 21.5% of residents were under the age of 18; 8.8% were between the ages of 18 and 24; 22.3% were from 25 to 44; 26.9% were from 45 to 64; and 20.7% were 65 or older. The gender makeup of the city was 48.4% male and 51.6% female.

=== 2000 census ===
As of the census of 2000, there were 3,070 people in 1,344 households, including 806 families, in the city. The population density was 890.5 inhabitants per square mile (343.8/km^{2}). There were 1,472 housing units at an average density of 427.0 per square mile (164.9/km^{2}). The racial makup of the city was 92.35% White, 0.07% African American, 5.70% Native American, 0.16% Asian, 0.42% from other races, and 1.30% from two or more races. Hispanic or Latino of any race were 2.15%.

Of the 1,344 households 27.7% had children under the age of 18 living with them, 50.5% were married couples living together, 7.7% had a female householder with no husband present, and 40.0% were non-families. 35.0% of households were one person and 18.5% were one person aged 65 or older. The average household size was 2.24 and the average family size was 2.91.

The age distribution was 24.1% under the age of 18, 7.9% from 18 to 24, 24.1% from 25 to 44, 22.0% from 45 to 64, and 21.8% 65 or older. The median age was 41 years. For every 100 females, there were 86.1 males. For every 100 females age 18 and over, there were 81.2 males.

The median household income was $32,031 and the median family income was $45,536. Males had a median income of $32,905 versus $22,957 for females. The per capita income for the city was $18,356. About 6.6% of families and 9.7% of the population were below the poverty line, including 6.8% of those under age 18 and 10.6% of those age 65 or over.

== Government ==
Presidential election results 1960–2020

Precinct General Election Results
Year	Republican	Democratic	Third parties
2020	52.8% 524	45.2% 420	2.0% 30
2016	50.0% 706	41.7% 589	8.3% 117
2012	40.6% 605	57.4% 856	2.0% 30
2008	38.1% 590	59.7% 926	2.2% 34
2004	38.4% 606	60.4% 953	1.2% 20
2000	37.1% 556	55.9% 838	7.0% 104
1996	25.5% 360	62.3% 880	12.2% 173
1992	24.9% 392	51.7% 815	23.4% 370
1988	45.9% 693	54.1% 817	0.0% 0
1984	52.6% 870	47.4% 783	0.0% 0
1980	48.9% 878	41.8% 750	9.3% 166
1976	40.6% 732	57.4% 1,036	2.0% 36
1972	54.6% 934	43.5% 744	1.9% 33
1968	41.5% 647	52.8% 923	5.7% 89
1964	42.7% 713	57.2% 955	0.1% 3
1960	56.6% 776	43.0% 590	0.4% 6

== Media ==
KWCM is a PBS television station located in Granite Falls.

== Infrastructure ==
=== Transportation ===
- United States Highway 212
- Minnesota State Highway 23
- Minnesota State Highway 67
