= Normania Township, Yellow Medicine County, Minnesota =

Normania Township, Minnesota
- Township
- Location within the state of Minnesota
- Coordinates: 44°49′N 95°48′W
- Country: United States
- State: Minnesota
- County: Yellow Medicine

Area
  - Total: 36.3 sq mi (93.9 km^{2})
  - Land: 35.5 sq mi (92.0 km^{2})
  - Water: 0.77 sq mi (2.0 km^{2})
- Elevation: 1,073 ft (327 m)

Population (2000)
  - Total: 188
  - Density: 5.2/sq mi (2/km^{2})
- Time zone: UTC-6 (Central (CST))
  - Summer (DST): UTC-5 (CDT)
- FIPS code: 27-46690
- GNIS feature ID: 0665140

Normania Township is a township (T114N R41W) in Yellow Medicine County, Minnesota, United States. The population was 188 at the 2000 census.

== History ==
Normania Township was originally called Ree Township, and under the latter name was organized in 1872. The present name, adopted in 1874, is supposedly after a place in Norway.

== Geography ==
According to the United States Census Bureau, the township has a total area of 36.3 square miles (93.9 km^{2}), of which 35.5 square miles (92.0 km^{2}) is land and 0.8 square mile (1.9 km^{2}) (2.07%) is water.

== Demographics ==
As of the census of 2000, there were 188 people, 74 households, and 54 families residing in the township. The population density was 5.3 inhabitants per square mile (2.0/km^{2}). There were 82 housing units at an average density of 2.3 per square mile (0.89/km^{2}). The racial makeup of the township was 100.00% White.

There were 74 households, out of which 31.1% had children under the age of 18 living with them, 66.2% were married couples living together, 4.1% had a female householder with no husband present, and 25.7% were non-families. 23.0% of all households were made up of individuals, and 8.1% had someone living alone who was 65 years of age or older. The average household size was 2.54 and the average family size was 2.98.

In the township the population was spread out, with 30.9% under the age of 18, 4.3% from 18 to 24, 27.7% from 25 to 44, 22.9% from 45 to 64, and 14.4% who were 65 years of age or older. The median age was 38 years. For every 100 females there were 111.2 males. For every 100 females age 18 and over, there were 113.1 males.

The median income for a household in the township was $36,750, and the median income for a family was $39,688. Males had a median income of $31,250 versus $27,083 for females. The per capita income for the township was $19,067. About 1.8% of families and 6.1% of the population were below the poverty line, including 7.5% of those under the age of eighteen and 14.3% of those 65 or over.
