= Minnesota Falls Township, Yellow Medicine County, Minnesota =

Minnesota Falls Township, Minnesota
- Township
- Location within the state of Minnesota Minnesota Falls Township, Minnesota (the United States)
- Coordinates: 44°45′42″N 95°33′8″W
- Country: United States
- State: Minnesota
- County: Yellow Medicine

Area
  - Total: 31.4 sq mi (81.3 km^{2})
  - Land: 31.1 sq mi (80.6 km^{2})
  - Water: 0.27 sq mi (0.7 km^{2})
- Elevation: 1,030 ft (314 m)

Population (2000)
  - Total: 361
  - Density: 12/sq mi (4.5/km^{2})
- Time zone: UTC-6 (Central (CST))
  - Summer (DST): UTC-5 (CDT)
- FIPS code: 27-43180
- GNIS feature ID: 0664993

Minnesota Falls Township is a township in Yellow Medicine County, Minnesota, United States. The population was 361 at the 2000 census.

Minnesota Falls Township was organized in 1873, and named for the falls on the Minnesota River.

== Geography ==
According to the United States Census Bureau, the township has a total area of 31.4 square miles (81.3 km^{2}), of which 31.1 square miles (80.6 km^{2}) is land and 0.3 square mile (0.7 km^{2}) (0.86%) is water.

== Demographics ==
As of the census of 2000, there were 361 people, 140 households, and 106 families residing in the township. The population density was 11.6 people per square mile (4.5/km^{2}). There were 157 housing units at an average density of 5.0/sq mi (1.9/km^{2}). The racial makeup of the township was 70.08% White, 28.81% Native American, 0.55% Asian, and 0.55% from two or more races. Hispanic or Latino of any race were 0.55% of the population.

There were 140 households, out of which 36.4% had children under the age of 18 living with them, 63.6% were married couples living together, 8.6% had a female householder with no husband present, and 23.6% were non-families. 20.0% of all households were made up of individuals, and 8.6% had someone living alone who was 65 years of age or older. The average household size was 2.58 and the average family size was 3.00.

In the township the population was spread out, with 28.3% under the age of 18, 3.9% from 18 to 24, 25.8% from 25 to 44, 27.4% from 45 to 64, and 14.7% who were 65 years of age or older. The median age was 40 years. For every 100 females, there were 104.0 males. For every 100 females age 18 and over, there were 99.2 males.

The median income for a household in the township was $41,667, and the median income for a family was $51,429. Males had a median income of $27,083 versus $20,250 for females. The per capita income for the township was $17,521. About 8.5% of families and 15.9% of the population were below the poverty line, including 24.7% of those under age 18 and 7.0% of those age 65 or over.
