= Minnesota State Highway 127 =

State highway in Minnesota, United States

Trunk Highway 127
- MN 127 highlighted in red

Route information
- Maintained by MnDOT
- Length: 2.531 mi (4.073 km)
- Existed: 1967–2013

Major junctions
- South end: I-94 at Orange Township
- North end: MN 27 at Osakis

Location
- Country: United States
- State: Minnesota
- Counties: Douglas

Highway system
- Minnesota Trunk Highway System; Interstate; US; State; Legislative; Scenic
← MN 123	→ MN 135

Minnesota State Highway 127 was a short 2.531-mile-long (4.073 km) connector highway in west-central Minnesota, which ran from its interchange with Interstate 94 in Orange Township northward to its intersection with State Highway 27 in Osakis. The highway was decommissioned when Highway 27 was moved to its alignment.

State Highway 127 passed through Orange Township, Osakis Township, and the city of Osakis.

== Route description ==
Highway 127 served as a short north–south connector route between Interstate 94 and State Highway 27 at Osakis.

== History ==
Highway 127 was added to the state highway system in 1967 when I-94 was completed. I-94 replaced U.S. Highway 52 in west-central Minnesota which had previously run through Osakis and Alexandria in this area.

Concrete paving was done when it became a state highway. Part of the road had previously been County Road 3. The route was part of Minnesota Constitutional Route 3 to (along with Highway 27) maintain the legal definition of that route through Alexandria, although it was not part of that original highway. Highway 127 was numbered as a spur of State Highway 27.

When Highway 27 was moved to overlap I-94 and the previous roadway turned over to Douglas County maintenance in November 2012, Highway 127 was removed, with its signage replaced by 2013. Highway 27 now follows this route.

== Major intersections ==
The entire route was in Douglas County.

Location	mi	km	Destinations	Notes
Orange Township	0.000– 0.161	0.000– 0.259	I-94 – St. Cloud, Alexandria CR 3 south – Westport	Interchange
Osakis	1.969	3.169	CR 3 (1st Avenue)	
Osakis	2.562	4.123	MN 27 (Nokomis Street)	
1.000 mi = 1.609 km; 1.000 km = 0.621 mi
