= Minnesota State Highway 121 =

State highway in Minnesota, United States

Trunk Highway 121
- MN 121 highlighted in red

Route information
- Maintained by MnDOT
- Length: 0.937 mi (1,508 m)
- Existed: 1935, 1979–present

Major junctions
- South end: I-35W in Richfield
- MN 62 in Minneapolis
- North end: CSAH 22 in Minneapolis

Location
- Country: United States
- State: Minnesota
- Counties: Hennepin

Highway system
- Minnesota Trunk Highway System; Interstate; US; State; Legislative; Scenic
← MN 120	→ MN 123

Minnesota State Highway 121 (MN 121) is a short freeway stub in Minnesota. It is less than one mile (1.6 km) in length.

MN 121 runs between Interstate Highway 35W in Richfield and Lyndale Avenue South (CSAH 22) in Minneapolis where it intersects West 58th Street. There was one interchange leading to westbound MN 62, but this has been reconfigured from a freeway-to-freeway configuration into a half-trumpet configuration with signals on MN 121.

== Route description ==
MN 121 serves as a freeway connector stub on the Minneapolis / Richfield boundary line. The short route connects I-35W, MN 62, and Lyndale Avenue in South Minneapolis.

The route is located in Hennepin County.

When traveling on I-35W northbound in Richfield, MN 121 is accessed by the "Highway 62 west / 58th Street" exit. 58th Street is then followed.

== History ==
Before I-35W was completed to downtown Minneapolis, old U.S. Highway 65 briefly took this stub (present day MN 121) to rejoin its old alignment on Lyndale Avenue South. A 1961 road map shows I-35W separating from Lyndale Avenue South at about 58th Street, then continuing south along its present alignment in Richfield and south into Bloomington. MN 121 was designated on its current alignment in 1979 after I-35W was built along the Crosstown (MN 62) and along 2nd Avenue South going into downtown.

=== Early history ===
Prior to 1979, MN 121 was routed on different alignments on various surface streets in South Minneapolis. The first alignment of MN 121 on France Avenue South was signed in 1935 between 50th Street northbound to Excelsior Boulevard. The route alignment of MN 121 was changed in 1957, 1969, 1979, and 1988. The surface streets that MN 121 had followed throughout these years included France Avenue South, 50th Street, Lyndale Avenue South, and 46th Street. All are now county-marked routes.

== Major intersections ==
The entire route is in Hennepin County.

Location	mi	km	Destinations	Notes
Richfield	0.000	0.000	I-35W	Southern terminus; I-35W exit 11
Richfield–Minneapolis line	0.259– 0.376	0.417– 0.605	MN 62	Interchange
Minneapolis	0.937	1.508	CSAH 22 north (S. Lyndale Avenue) / W. 58th Street	Northern terminus; old US 65
1.000 mi = 1.609 km; 1.000 km = 0.621 mi
