= Minnesota State Highway 123 =

State highway in Minnesota, United States

Trunk Highway 123
- MN 123 highlighted in red

Route information
- Maintained by MnDOT
- Length: 8.037 mi (12.934 km)
- Existed: 1946–present

Major junctions
- South end: MN 23 near Sandstone
- North end: MN 23 near Askov

Location
- Country: United States
- State: Minnesota
- Counties: Pine

Highway system
- Minnesota Trunk Highway System; Interstate; US; State; Legislative; Scenic
← MN 121	→ MN 127

Minnesota State Highway 123 (MN 123) is a 8.037-mile-long (12.934 km) highway in east-central Minnesota, which runs from its first intersection with State Highway 23 at Sandstone and continues east and then north to its northern terminus at its second intersection with State Highway 23 near Askov. The route passes through the city of Sandstone, Sandstone Township, and Finlayson Township.

== Route description ==
Highway 123 serves as an east–west and north–south route between Sandstone and Askov in east-central Minnesota.

The route changes direction to north–south in Sandstone Township and continues as north–south to its northern terminus in Finlayson Township near Askov.

Highway 123 passes briefly through Banning State Park. The park entrance is located on nearby Highway 23, east of Interstate 35 near Askov.

The route is legally defined as Route 185 in the Minnesota Statutes. It is not marked with this number.

== History ==
Highway 123 was originally part of State Highway 23 from 1934 to 1946. Highway 23 originally ran through the center of Sandstone on Main Street and Third Street. Highway 123 now follows this route and was signed in 1946.

Highway 123 was numbered as a derivative of Highway 23.

The east-west portion of the highway was paved when it was marked. The north-south segment was paved in 1949.

== Major intersections ==
The entire route is in Pine County.

Location	mi	km	Destinations	Notes
Sandstone Township	0.000	0.000	MN 23	Southern terminus
Sandstone	0.923	1.485	CR 64 (Main Street)	
Sandstone	1.450– 1.526	2.334– 2.456	Kettle River	
Sandstone Township	2.022	3.254	CR 29	
Sandstone Township	4.018	6.466	CR 30	
Finlayson–Partridge township line	8.054	12.962	MN 23	Northern terminus
1.000 mi = 1.609 km; 1.000 km = 0.621 mi
