= Minnesota State Highway 167 =

State highway in Minnesota

Trunk Highway 167
- MN 167 highlighted in red

Route information
- Maintained by MnDOT
- Length: 7.304 mi (11.755 km)
- Existed: September, 27 2022–present
- Tourist routes: Minnesota River Valley Scenic Byway

Major junctions
- West end: MN 23 / MN 67 at Granite Falls
- East end: Upper Sioux Agency State Park

Location
- Country: United States
- State: Minnesota
- Counties: Yellow Medicine

Highway system
- Minnesota Trunk Highway System; Interstate; US; State; Legislative; Scenic
← MN 165	→ US 169

Trunk Highway 167 (MN 167) is a state highway in Yellow Medicine County, Minnesota. It was created in 2022 from a portion of MN 67 that closed after the roadbed began to collapse. MN 67 was rerouted around the closure at the same time MN 167 was established.

== Route description ==
MN 167 begins at an intersection with MN 23 and MN 67 in Granite Falls, Minnesota near a sharp bend in the Minnesota River. It heads to the southeast and curves around meanders in the river's course. It passes through the Upper Sioux Community before reaching the former Upper Sioux Agency State Park, which was closed on February 16, 2024. The route ends where the entrance was to the state park.

The route is legally defined as Route 340 in the Minnesota Statutes. It is not marked with this number.

== History ==
In April 2019, the Minnesota Department of Transportation (MnDOT) closed MN 67 in both directions approximately 8 miles (13 km) southeast of the intersection of MN 67 and MN 23 in Granite Falls. The closure was necessary due to unstable ground deep underneath the roadbed, causing large cracks to appear in the road surface and rendering it impassable for traffic. A detour was put into place that followed State Highway 274 and County Road 2 and between Granite Falls and Echo. MnDOT permanently rerouted MN 67 along this detour and announced the creation of MN 167 on September 27, 2022.

== Major intersections ==
The entire route is in Yellow Medicine County.

Location	mi	km	Destinations	Notes
Sioux Agency Township	0.000	0.000	Upper Sioux Agency State Park entrance road	
Granite Falls	7.304	11.755	MN 23 / MN 67 – Granite Falls, Echo, Marshall	
1.000 mi = 1.609 km; 1.000 km = 0.621 mi
