= Interstate 335 (Minnesota) =

Canceled Highway in Minnesota

Interstate 335
- Proposed I-335 corridor highlighted in red

Route information
- Auxiliary route of I-35
- Maintained by MnDOT
- Length: 2.74 mi (4.41 km)
- Existed: 1964–1978 (never built)
- NHS: Entire route

Location
- Country: United States
- State: Minnesota
- County: Hennepin

Highway system
- Interstate Highway System; Main; Auxiliary; Suffixed; Business; Future; Minnesota Trunk Highway System; Interstate; US; State; Legislative; Scenic

Interstate 335 (I-335) is a canceled auxiliary Interstate route in Minneapolis, Minnesota. It was planned to cross Northeast Minneapolis from I-35W south of Broadway to I-94 in North Minneapolis. Land was acquired and some demolition had proceeded when the road was defeated by local opposition.

== Route description ==
I-335, also called the North Ring, was planned as part of a loop around central Minneapolis. It would have connected I-35W north of downtown Minneapolis westward to I-94 to provide better access to the city's central business district and later to ease congestion on the Lowry Hill Tunnel on I-94. The eastern terminus of I-335 was to be on I-35W northeast of downtown Minneapolis, between the Hennepin Avenue and Broadway Street bridges.

== History ==
The federal government granted approval for I-335 in October 1964. In spite of opposition from local residents, the Minneapolis City Council approved plans for the freeway in July 1970 and began purchasing right-of-way. However, increasing protest from residents prompted the council to withdraw its support in 1972. Senator Walter Mondale and Representative Donald M. Fraser began working to stop the highway, successfully getting funding for I-335 withheld. Support for the freeway continued to drop, and the US Department of Transportation removed it from the Interstate Highway System in 1978.

Although I-335 was never built, evidence of its planning still exists. Until 2014, unused pavement was present at the New Brighton Boulevard and Johnson Street exits from I-35W, and to this day an unused entry lane can be seen directly below East Hennepin Avenue on the west side of the freeway.

Additionally, a strip of housing in the area is of 1970s vintage, which is much newer than the surrounding houses in the neighborhood. These houses were built once the I-335 project was canceled, on land where the older housing stock had been demolished in preparation for the freeway. For many years, blank lines on exit signage also existed on I-35W in the area until the original signs and roadway were redone many years later.

I-335 was listed in the 1978 Federal Highway Administration route log with a length of 2.74 miles (4.41 km).
