= Minnesota State Highway 224 =

State highway in Minnesota, United States

Trunk Highway 224
- MN 224 highlighted in red

Route information
- Maintained by MnDOT
- Length: 4.408 mi (7.094 km)
- Existed: 1949–2005

Major junctions
- West end: US 59 in Ogema
- East end: CSAH 34 in White Earth Township

Location
- Country: United States
- State: Minnesota
- Counties: Becker

Highway system
- Minnesota Trunk Highway System; Interstate; US; State; Legislative; Scenic
← MN 223	→ MN 225

Minnesota State Highway 224 was a short 4.408-mile-long (7.094 km) state highway connecting the unincorporated town of White Earth with U.S. Highway 59 at Ogema. The route was turned back to Becker County maintenance in 2005.

== Route description ==
Highway 224 is 4.4 miles (7.1 km) in length and serves the communities of Ogema, White Earth Township, and White Earth.

The route was legally defined as Legislative Route 224 in the Minnesota Statutes § 161.115(155).

== History ==
Highway 224 was authorized on July 1, 1949 and paved by 1953. It was turned back to Becker County in 2005, and as part of the turnback agreement the roadway is slated to be reconstructed in 2013.

== Major intersections ==
The entire highway was in Becker County.

Location	mi	km	Destinations	Notes
Ogema	0.000	0.000	US 59	
Ogema	0.029	0.047	2nd Street (County 85)	
Ogema	0.165	0.266	Sunnyside Avenue (County 86)	
White Earth Township	2.046	3.293	CR 109 south	
White Earth Township	3.027	4.871	CR 111 north	
White Earth Township	4.087	6.577	CSAH 21 south	
White Earth	4.408	7.094	CSAH 21 north / CSAH 34 east / CR 133 south	Road continued as County 34
1.000 mi = 1.609 km; 1.000 km = 0.621 mi
