= Minnesota State Highway 12 =

Minnesota State Highway 12 may refer to:

- U.S. Route 12 in Minnesota
- Minnesota State Highway 12 (1920), a trunk highway in Minnesota
