= River Road Fellowship =

Minnesota group

- Type: Christian cult
- Founder and leader: Victor Barnard
- Senior membership: David A. Larsen Randal Roark Pamela Roark Craig Emblad Susan Emblad Stephanie Barnard
- Headquarters: "Shepherd's Camp", Finlayson Township, Pine County, Minnesota
- Origin: Early 1990s
- Branched from: The Way
- Defunct: ca. 2014
- Members: ca. 150 at peak

River Road Fellowship was a Christian messianic sect that operated from the early 1990s to approximately 2014 in a remote area of Pine County, Minnesota, United States. Founded by Victor Barnard, the group identified itself as a Christian community but diverged significantly from mainstream Christian teachings. The group dispersed following Barnard's conviction for sexually assaulting two children.

== History and formation ==
Barnard had previously been affiliated with The Way, a Christian sect founded in the 1940s. In the early 1990s, he broke away and gathered several followers to form his own group. He encouraged members to sell their homes and move with him to a rural compound called "Shepherd's Camp," located in Finlayson Township, Minnesota, about 90 miles north of Minneapolis.

The group's teachings emphasized strict adherence to biblical literalism and the expectation of Christ's imminent return. Barnard positioned himself as a divinely anointed leader with unique authority and spiritual insight.

== "Maidens" and abuse allegations ==
In 2000, Barnard announced a new teaching in which he asked families to "sacrifice" their first-born daughters to God. Barnard chose ten girls and young women, referred to as "Maidens," to live in a secluded area of the compound, where they were subjected to Barnard's complete control. Barnard allegedly told the girls that he represented Christ on earth and that sexual contact with him was a divine act of love.

Two of the victims later reported that Barnard began sexually assaulting them when they were 12 and 13 years old. The abuse continued for several years.

== Investigation and prosecution ==
Although reports of misconduct were made in 2012, criminal charges were not filed until 2014, when prosecutors in Pine County charged Barnard with 59 counts of criminal sexual conduct. Barnard fled the United States and was added to the United States Marshals Service "Most Wanted" list.

In March 2015, Brazilian authorities arrested Barnard in the resort town of Pipa, and he was extradited to Minnesota later that year. In October 2016, Barnard pleaded guilty to sexually assaulting two girls and was sentenced to 30 years in prison. The case centered on the testimony of survivors Lindsay Tornambe and Jess Schlinsky. On appeal, his sentence was reduced to 24 years in 2017.

== Decline and relocation ==
By 2008, the group began to fracture after revelations that Barnard was having sexual relationships with married women within the Fellowship. Several elders and families relocated to Spokane, Washington, and in 2009 the compound was sold to the Salvation Army. After Barnard's arrest, remaining members distanced themselves from the group, and River Road Fellowship ceased to exist by around 2014.

== Civil litigation ==
In 2017, Lindsay Tornambe filed a civil lawsuit in Pine County against 15 former leaders of River Road Fellowship. The lawsuit alleged that the elders negligently exposed minors to Barnard's sexual abuse and failed to intervene or report it to authorities.

== Media coverage ==
The group and Barnard's crimes have been the subject of extensive media coverage, including a 2023 podcast series titled The Turning: River Road by Rococo Punch, featuring testimony from survivors and law enforcement officials. The case has also been discussed in investigative news specials by CBS Minnesota and Fox 9, examining the dynamics of coercive control and spiritual abuse within isolated religious movements. In 2025, former member Luke Allen published a memoir about growing up in the cult titled, Cult Life: Tales of a Radical Christian Boyhood.
