= Interstate 35W (Minnesota) =

Interstate Highway in Minnesota, United States

Interstate 35W
- I-35W highlighted in red

Route information
- Maintained by MnDOT
- Length: 41.778 mi (67.235 km)
- NHS: Entire route

Major junctions
- South end: I-35 / I-35E in Burnsville
- MN 13 in Burnsville; I-494 / MN 5 in Richfield—Bloomington; MN 62 in Richfield and Minneapolis; I-94 / US 12 / US 52 / MN 55 in Minneapolis; MN 36 / MN 280 in Roseville; I-694 from New Brighton to Arden Hills; US 10 in Mounds View
- North end: I-35 / I-35E in Columbus

Location
- Country: United States
- State: Minnesota
- Counties: Dakota, Hennepin, Ramsey, Anoka

Highway system
- Interstate Highway System; Main; Auxiliary; Suffixed; Business; Future; Minnesota Trunk Highway System; Interstate; US; State; Legislative; Scenic
← I-35E	→ MN 36

Interstate 35W (I-35W) is an Interstate Highway in the US state of Minnesota, passing through downtown Minneapolis. It is one of two through routes for I-35 through the Twin Cities of Minneapolis and Saint Paul, the other being I-35E through downtown Saint Paul.

Traveling north, I-35 splits at Burnsville, and the I-35W route runs north for 41 miles (66 km), carrying its own separate sequence of exit numbers. It runs through the city of Minneapolis before rejoining with I-35E to reform I-35 in Columbus near Forest Lake. I-35W supplanted sections of old U.S. Highway 8 (US 8) northeast of Minneapolis and old US 65 south of Minneapolis that have since been removed from the United States Numbered Highway System.

During the early years of the Interstate Highway System, branching Interstates with directional suffixes, such as N, S, E, and W, were common nationwide. On every other Interstate nationwide, these directional suffixes have been phased out by redesignating the suffixed route numbers with a loop or spur route number designation (such as I-270 in Maryland, which was once I-70S) or, in some cases, were assigned a different route number (such as I-76, which was once I-80S). In the case of I-35 in the Twin Cities area, since neither branch is clearly the main route and both branches return to a unified Interstate beyond the cities of Minneapolis and Saint Paul, officials at the American Association of State Highway and Transportation Officials (AASHTO) have allowed the suffixes of E and W in Minnesota to remain in the present day. I-35 also splits into I-35E and I-35W in Dallas–Fort Worth, Texas, for similar reasons as the I-35 split in the Minneapolis–Saint Paul area.

== Route description ==
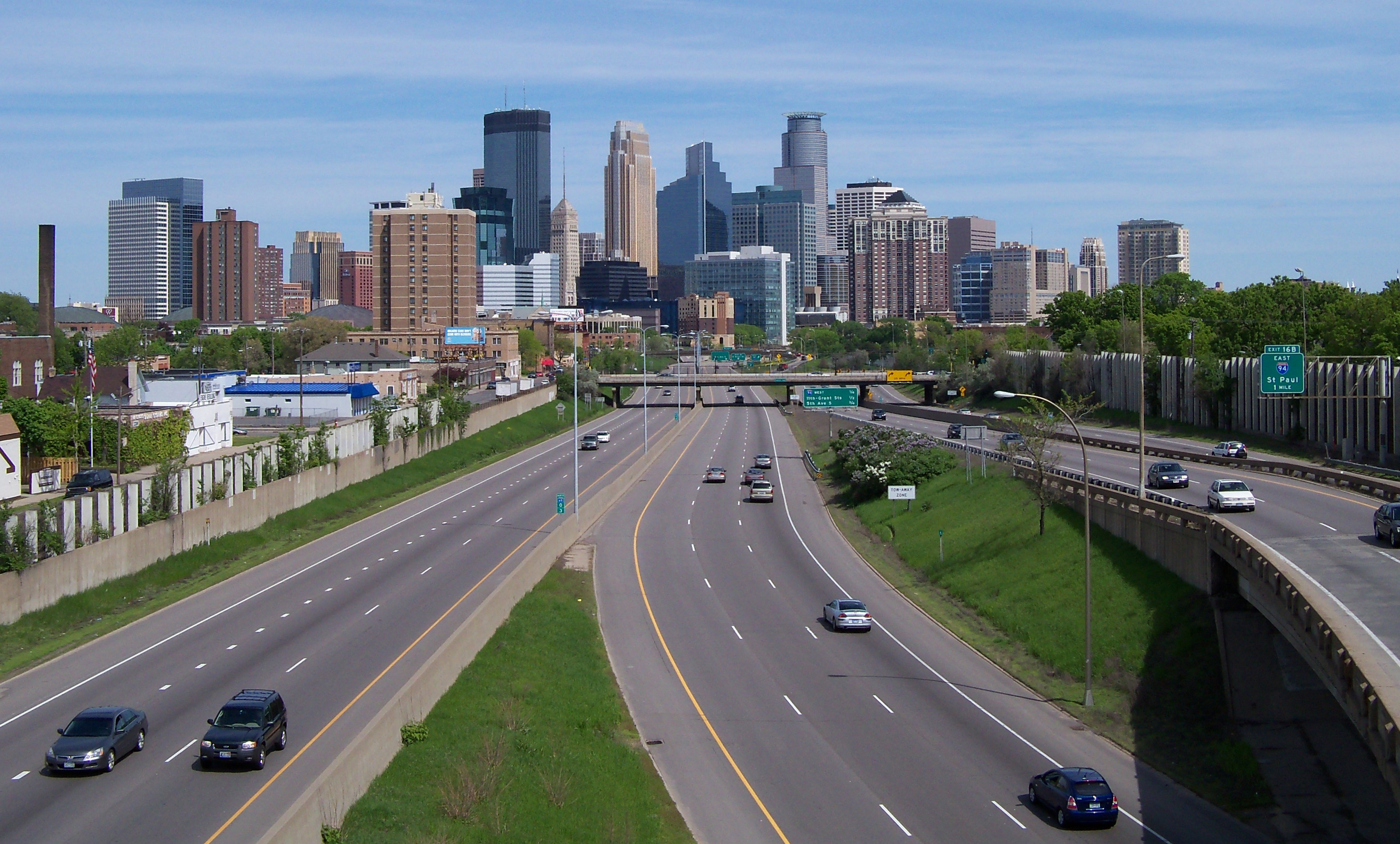
I-35W approaching downtown Minneapolis from the south

The southern terminus of I-35W is at Burnsville, where I-35 splits into I-35E and I-35W. While I-35E takes a northeasterly path into Saint Paul, I-35W heads north into Minneapolis. I-35W maintains a northbound direction in Burnsville with two lanes and adds a third lane at Burnsville Parkway. It then crosses the Minnesota River into Bloomington. At the Bloomington–Richfield city boundary, I-35W has a cloverleaf interchange with I-494 at exits 9A and 9B. I-35W continues northbound into Richfield, where it turns east and joins with Minnesota State Highway 62 (MN 62) for about 0.25 miles (0.40 km) in what is locally known as the Crosstown Commons. I-35W and MN 62 split as two lanes of I-35W turn northbound toward downtown Minneapolis, where it adds back a third lane and then later a fourth and a fifth lane at the 46th Street onramp.

I-35W swerves slightly northeast immediately south of downtown to avoid the Washburn-Fair Oaks Mansion District. Three lanes then split north onto MN 65 (Old US 65), which exits into downtown. The two righthand lanes of I-35W curve a sharp right east where it runs side by side with I-94 and US 52 for less than one mile (1.6 km), allowing drivers to exchange highways. Here, the interchange with I-94/US 52 does not have direct access for southbound I-35W to eastbound I-94/southbound US 52 or westbound I-94/northbound US 52 to northbound I-35W. Drivers must use the Cedar and Washington avenue exits to make these connections. Alternatively, MN 280 provides an expressway link for motorists needing to make these connections.

I-35W completes its eastern loop around downtown, and then crosses the Mississippi River on the St. Anthony Falls Bridge and winds northeast out of Northeast Minneapolis. Here, I-35W passes through industrial areas near the suburbs of St. Anthony, Lauderdale, Roseville, New Brighton, and Arden Hills.

I-35W then meets I-694 in New Brighton and Arden Hills at a cloverleaf interchange at exits 26B and 26C. US 10 joins I-35W one mile (1.6 km) north of the I-35W/I-694 interchange at exit 28A. I-35W and US 10 run concurrently for another one mile (1.6 km) before the latter turns westward in Mounds View and Shoreview at exit 30. I-35W passes next to the former site of the Twin Cities Ordnance Plant and again turns northeastward through the suburbs of Blaine and Lino Lakes. The communities of Lexington and Circle Pines are also nearby throughout this stretch. I-35W then merges with I-35E to reform I-35 at Columbus near Forest Lake.

I-35W carries its own set of exit numbers in the Twin Cities area, while I-35E continues the I-35 exit numbering scheme, which goes between the Iowa state line and the city of Duluth. (The same setup also applies to the other I-35E/I-35W splits in Dallas–Fort Worth, Texas.)

Legally, the route of I-35W is defined as part of unmarked Legislative Route 394 in the Minnesota Statutes § 161.12(2); I-35W is not marked with this legislative number along the actual highway.

== History ==
Driving north on I-35W from 35th St. to Downtown Minneapolis prior to its initial opening

=== Flooding ===
I-35W is prone to heavy-rain event flooding in several areas, intersecting both natural habitats, including the Minnesota Valley National Wildlife Refuge between Burnsville and Bloomington, and the dense urban areas through the city of Minneapolis. In the great 1965 Minnesota River flood, the highway was underwater in the floodplain wetlands south of the Minnesota River bridge at Burnsville. Dikes have been constructed, and the highway has been raised since then. The storm sewer system under I-35W in the urban core of south Minneapolis has also been cited as a place prone to flashfloods during rain events. Improvements continue to be made to this area as part of future projects.

=== Minnesota River crossing ===
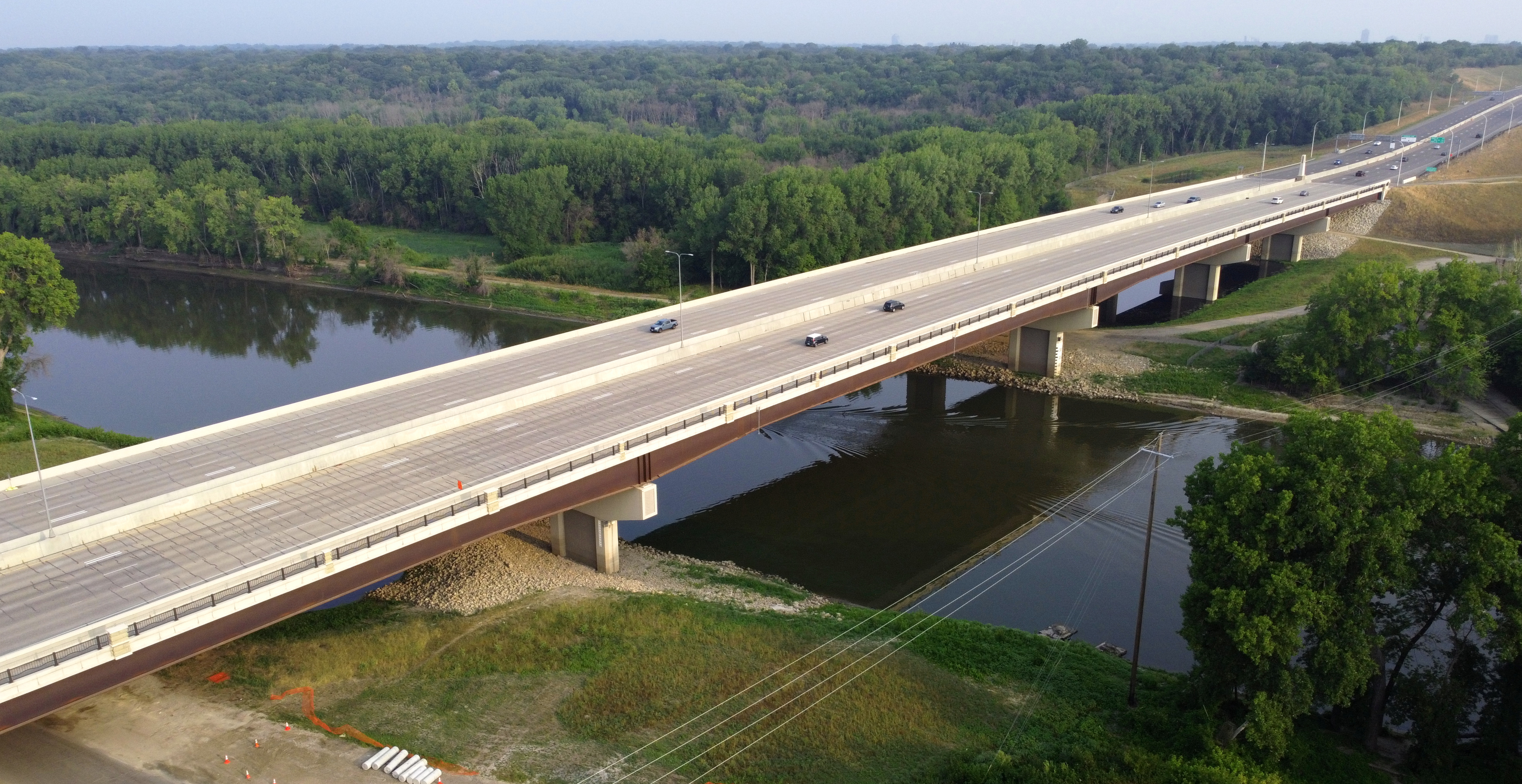
I-35W Bridge over Minnesota River

When the Minnesota River bridge between Burnsville and Bloomington was completed in 1960, it was two lanes in each direction. I-35W, at the time, only extended as far south as MN 13 in Burnsville. Improvements were made in 1984 to redeck and widen the bridge, but subsoil problems found at the north end resulted in the new lanes being temporarily closed. In 1989, the lanes were opened as high-occupancy vehicle lanes when the Minnesota Department of Transportation (MnDOT) expanded the north approach to carry the additional traffic.

=== Mississippi River crossing ===
On August 1, 2007, the I-35W Mississippi River bridge in Minneapolis collapsed into the Mississippi River around 6:05 pm CDT, killing 13 people and injuring 145. The metal arch bridge had a length of approximately 1,900 feet (580 m) and a roadway height of over 100 feet (30 m) above the river. The bridge connected Minneapolis southwest of the Mississippi River to the Northeast Minneapolis neighborhood and served residents in the northern suburbs of the metro area. Because of the collapse of the bridge, I-35W traffic was temporarily detoured through eastbound I-94 to northbound MN 280 where it meets up with I-35W in Roseville.

The replacement I-35W Saint Anthony Falls Bridge was built in less than a year and opened to traffic on September 18, 2008, at 5:00 am CDT, three months ahead of schedule.

=== I-35W and Highway 62 Crosstown Commons reconstruction project ===
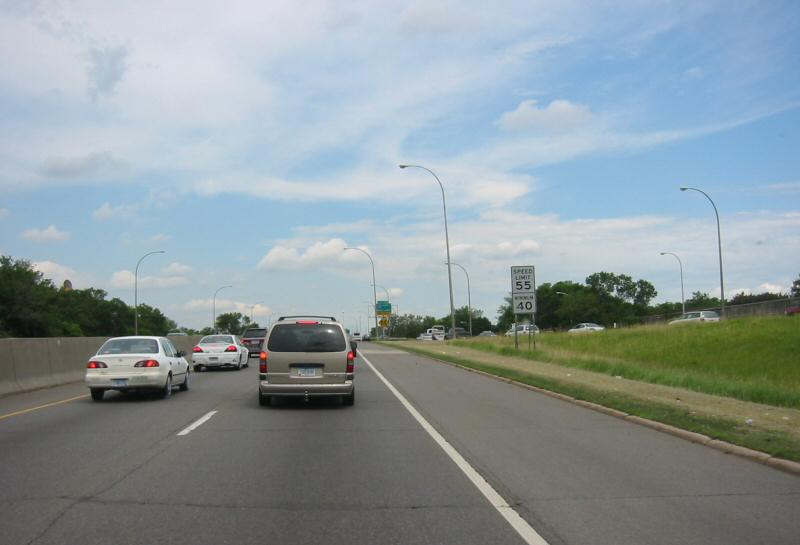
A preconstruction photo of the Crosstown Commons junction. The two left lanes are I-35W northbound, while MN 62 enters via the ramp on the right.

The Crosstown Commons was one of the most congested traffic interchanges in Minnesota. While it is sometimes referred to as an intersection, it is a one-mile (1.6 km) merger or concurrency of I-35W and MN 62. The layout is not a typical intersection: there is only a single level of roadbed and it creates a dogleg in I-35W. This shared right-of-way intersection for I-35W and MN 62 has been a topic of political debate for many years. As originally built, there were only six lanes on the commons, and all drivers merging from one highway to the other are required to change at least one lane as they merge and then diverge again. The name comes from the fact that MN 62 is also known locally as the Crosstown Highway.

The project to improve the interchange began in May 2007 after bids were received in April 2007. The new interchange features three throughlanes for I-35W in both directions, ending at 42nd Street, and two separate throughlanes for MN 62 in each direction, eliminating the need to weave across traffic. The cost of correcting the deficiencies in that short stretch of highway was estimated to be $285 million (equivalent to $426 million in 2025).

In 2004, the City of Minneapolis threatened to withhold municipal consent for the project unless new bus lanes and bus stations were included. Lake Street currently has a bus station at grade with I-35W on both sides. Eventually, the project was altered to include the desired additional bus access. The bid was won by the Ames, Lunda, and Schafer consortium for the 2007 cost of $288 million (equivalent to $430 million in 2025). The project included 25 new bridges, 63 lane miles (101 km) of highway, and expanded the total roadway width from six lanes to 12 lanes at Lyndale Avenue. The bridges were cast in Coates and trucked in for onsite erection. The new design includes transit/HOV lanes and was completed in November 2010.

=== 35W@94: Downtown to Crosstown ===
The 35W@94 Downtown to Crosstown Project was a construction project to repave and reconfigure I-35W and I-94. The work took place from 15th Street to 43rd Street on I-35W, and I-94 from Portland Avenue to 3rd Avenue in Minneapolis. The project added a southbound entrance at County Road 3 (Lake Street), added a northbound exit to 28th Street, reconstructing and widening frontage roads to accommodate new ramps. HOV lanes using E-ZPass replaced the dynamic shoulder lanes in the center of the freeway. Retaining walls, noise barriers, and bridges being replaced throughout the entirety of the project. The METRO Orange Line uses a new station at Lake Street, and a bus-only transit ramp on 12th Street connecting I-35W to downtown. The entire project was completed in September 2021.

== Transit ==
The METRO Orange Line bus rapid transitway runs from the southern suburb of Burnsville to downtown Minneapolis on I-35W, passing through Bloomington, and Richfield. It uses HOV lanes and a transit ramp into downtown Minneapolis.

== Exit list ==
County	Location	mi	km	Exit	Destinations	Notes
Dakota	Burnsville	0.000	0.000		I-35 south / I-35E	I-35W south and I-35E south merge into I-35; no access to I-35E from I-35W; I-35 north exit 88A
Dakota	Burnsville	0.603	0.970	1	CSAH 42 / Crystal Lake Road	Southbound exit and northbound entrance; access to Fairview Ridges Hospital
Dakota	Burnsville	2.328	3.747	2	Burnsville Parkway	
Dakota	Burnsville	2.693– 2.707	4.334– 4.356	3	MN 13 – Shakopee	Signed as exits 3A (north) and 3B (south); access to Burnsville Heart of the City station
Dakota	Burnsville	3.166– 3.196	5.095– 5.143	4A	CSAH 5 / CSAH 32 (Cliff Road)	
Dakota	Burnsville	4.153– 4.427	6.684– 7.125	4B	Black Dog Road	
Hennepin	Bloomington	5.225– 5.251	8.409– 8.451	5	106th Street	
Hennepin	Bloomington	6.236	10.036	6	CSAH 1 (98th Street)	
Hennepin	Bloomington	6.766	10.889	7A	94th Street	
Hennepin	Bloomington	7.299	11.747	7B	90th Street	
Hennepin	Bloomington	8.294	13.348	8A	82nd Street	Previously exit 8 before major updates in 2026
Hennepin	Bloomington–Richfield line	8.747– 8.758	14.077– 14.095	8B–C	I-494 / MN 5 – MSP Airport	Segment was converted from cloverleaf to a turbine interchange and is signed as exits 8B (east) and 8C (west); I-494 exit 5; previously exits 9A and 9B before the major update in 2026
Hennepin	Richfield	9.008	14.497	9	76th Street	Southbound exit and northbound entrance
Hennepin	Richfield	10.248– 10.276	16.493– 16.538	10	CSAH 53 (66th Street)	
Hennepin	Richfield–Minneapolis line	10.417– 12.4	16.765– 20.0	11	MN 62 (Crosstown Highway) / CSAH 35 (Portland Avenue) / 58th Street / 60th Street	58th Street not signed southbound; 60th Street and CSAH 35 (Portland Avenue) not signed northbound; access to 58th Street via MN 121
Hennepin	Richfield–Minneapolis line	10.995– 11.019	17.695– 17.733	11A	Lyndale Avenue	Closed, now part of reconstructed MN 62 (Crosstown Highway) interchange; was southbound exit and northbound entrance
Hennepin	Minneapolis	11.867– 11.891	19.098– 19.137	12A	60th Street	Closed, now part of exit 11 SB; was southbound exit and northbound entrance
Hennepin	Minneapolis	12.518	20.146	12	Diamond Lake Road	No southbound entrance
Hennepin	Minneapolis	13.133– 13.632	21.136– 21.939	–	I-35W & 46th Street station	Buses only; left exits
Hennepin	Minneapolis	13.632	21.939	13	CSAH 46 (46th Street)	
Hennepin	Minneapolis	14.880– 15.005	23.947– 24.148	14	36th Street, 35th Street	
Hennepin	Minneapolis	15.484– 15.627	24.919– 25.149	15A	CSAH 3 (Lake Street) / 31st Street	No northbound entrance
Hennepin	Minneapolis	15.576– 15.647	25.067– 25.181	–	I-35W & Lake Street station	Buses only; left exits
Hennepin	Minneapolis			15B	28th Street	Northbound exit only
Hennepin	Minneapolis	16.194– 16.892	26.062– 27.185	16A	I-94 west / US 12 west / US 52 north / MN 55 west – Downtown exits	Northbound exit and southbound entrance; downtown exits via old MN 65; provides access to 5th Avenue South, 11th Street, and East Grant Street
Hennepin	Minneapolis				5th Avenue	Northbound entrance only
Hennepin	Minneapolis	17.400	28.003	16B	I-94 east / US 12 west / US 52 south – Saint Paul	Northbound exit and southbound entrance
Hennepin	Minneapolis	17.652– 17.697	28.408– 28.481	17A	MN 55 east (Hiawatha Avenue)	Southbound exit and northbound entrance
Hennepin	Minneapolis	17.378	27.967	17B	I-94 west / US 12 west / US 52 north / MN 55 east / 11th Avenue	Southbound exit and northbound entrance
Hennepin	Minneapolis	17.968– 18.134	28.917– 29.184	17C	CSAH 122 (3rd Street) / CSAH 152 (Washington Avenue) – University of Minnesota	Signed as "3rd St – U of M" northbound and "Washington Ave" southbound
Hennepin	Minneapolis	18.374– 18.736	29.570– 30.153	St. Anthony Falls Bridge over the Mississippi River		
Hennepin	Minneapolis	18.804– 18.881	30.262– 30.386	18	CSAH 36 (University Avenue) / 4th Street SE	
Hennepin	Minneapolis	19.282– 19.388	31.031– 31.202	19	CSAH 52 (East Hennepin Avenue)	Northbound exit and southbound entrance
Hennepin	Minneapolis	19.564– 20.779	31.485– 33.441	–	I-335	Canceled in 1978; former stub ramps
Hennepin	Minneapolis	20.535– 20.779	33.048– 33.441	20	CSAH 27 (Stinson Boulevard) / CSAH 88 (New Brighton Boulevard)	
Hennepin	Minneapolis	21.518– 21.552	34.630– 34.685	21	To MN 280 / Industrial Boulevard / St. Anthony Boulevard	
Ramsey	Roseville	21.955– 22.298	35.333– 35.885	22A	MN 280	Southbound exit and northbound entrance
Ramsey	Roseville	22.619– 23.100	36.402– 37.176	22B	MN 36 / Cleveland Avenue	
Ramsey	Roseville	23.513– 23.547	37.841– 37.895	23	CSAH 23 (County Road C) / CSAH 46 (Cleveland Avenue)	
Ramsey	Roseville–New Brighton line	24.578	39.554	24A	CSAH 19 (County Road D)	
Ramsey	New Brighton	24.920	40.105	24B	CSAH 88	Southbound exit and northbound entrance
Ramsey	Arden Hills–New Brighton line	26.090	41.988	26A	CSAH 46 (County Road E2) / CSAH 73	
Ramsey	Arden Hills–New Brighton line	26.760– 26.776	43.066– 43.092	26	I-694	Signed as exits 26B (east) and 26C (west); I-694 exit 41
Ramsey	Arden Hills–New Brighton line	27.594	44.408	27	CSAH 96	Diverging diamond interchange
Ramsey	Arden Hills–Mounds View line	28.250– 28.481	45.464– 45.836	28A	US 10 east – Saint Paul	Southern end of US 10 concurrency; southbound exit and northbound entrance
Ramsey	Arden Hills–Mounds View line	28.250– 25.481	45.464– 41.008	28B	CSAH 10	Northbound exit and southbound entrance
Ramsey	Arden Hills–Mounds View line	28.734	46.243	28C	To CSAH 10 / CSAH 9 (County Road H)	No southbound entrance
Ramsey	Arden Hills–Mounds View– Shoreview tripoint	29.588– 29.608	47.617– 47.649	29	CSAH 3 (County Road I)	No northbound entrance
Ramsey	Shoreview–Mounds View line	30.134	48.496	30	US 10 west – Anoka	Northern end of US 10 concurrency
Ramsey–Anoka county line	Shoreview–Mounds View– Blaine tripoint	30.733	49.460	31A	CSAH 32 (85th Avenue NE)	Northbound exit and southbound entrance
Anoka	Blaine	31.006	49.899	31B	CSAH 23 (Lake Drive)	Northbound exit and southbound entrance
Anoka	Blaine	32.014	51.522	32	CSAH 52 (95th Avenue NE)	
Anoka	Blaine	33.602	54.077	33	CSAH 17 (Lexington Avenue)	
Anoka	Lino Lakes	36.512	58.760	36	CSAH 23 (Lake Drive)	
Anoka	Columbus	41.778	67.235		I-35 north / I-35E	I-35W north and I-35E north merge into I-35; no access to I-35E from I-35W; I-35 south exit 127
1.000 mi = 1.609 km; 1.000 km = 0.621 mi: Closed/former; Concurrency terminus; HOV only; Incomplete access
