= I-35W Saint Anthony Falls Bridge =

Bridge in Minneapolis, Minnesota

Saint Anthony Falls Bridge
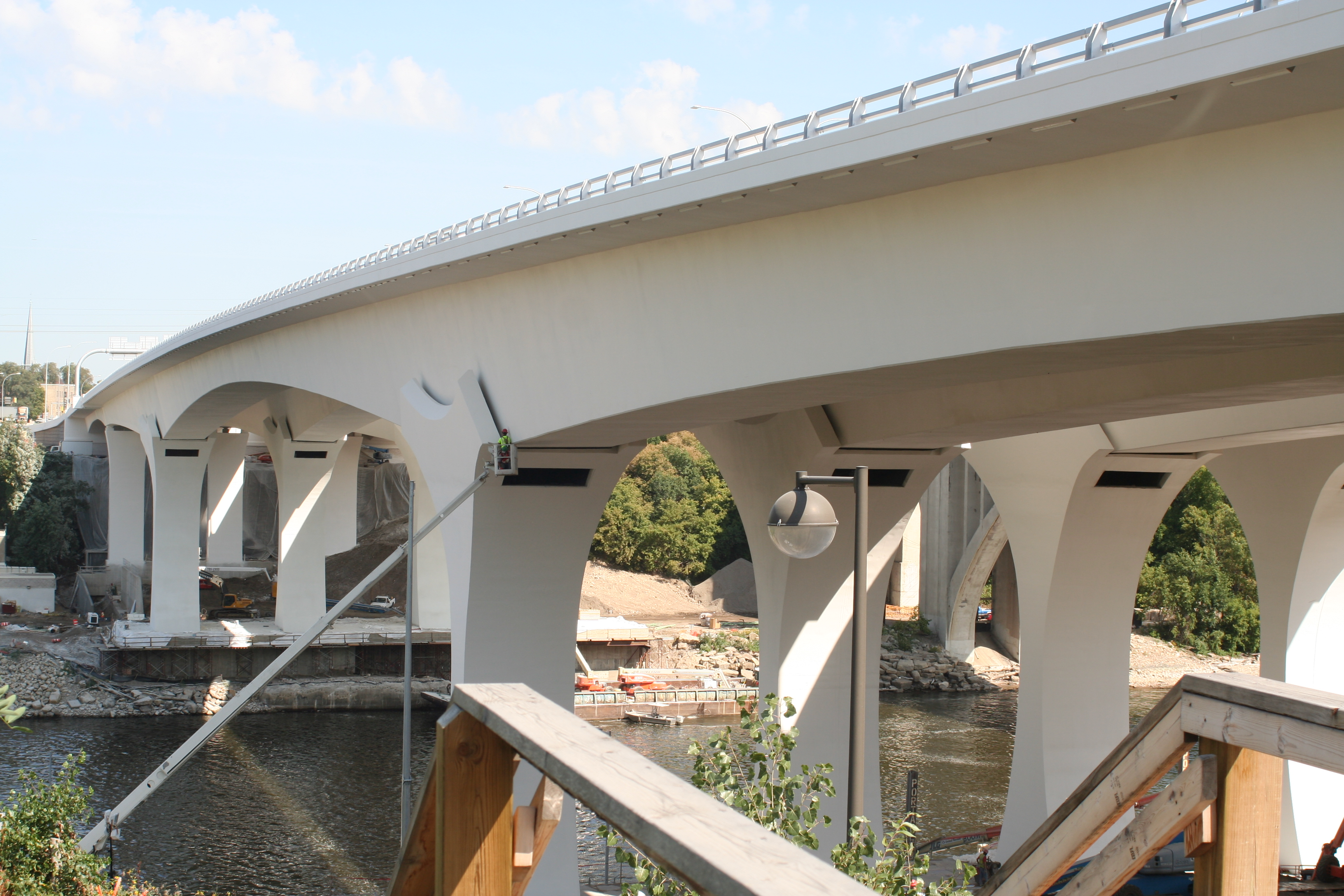
- Opening day, September 18, 2008, from south end.
- Coordinates: 44°58′44″N 93°14′42″W
- Carries: 10 Lanes of I-35W; light-rail or bus-way-ready
- Crosses: Mississippi River
- Locale: Minneapolis, Minnesota, U.S.
- Official name: I-35W Saint Anthony Falls Bridge
- Maintained by: Minnesota Department of Transportation (Mn/DOT)
- ID number: NBI 27410 (Northbound), 27409 (Southbound)

Characteristics
- Design: Post-tensioned precast box girder bridge
- Total length: 1,216 feet (371 m)
- Width: 180 feet (55 m)
- Height: 120 feet (37 m) (estimated)
- Longest span: 504 feet (154 m)
- Clearance below: 70 feet (21 m)

History
- Construction start: October 30, 2007
- Opened: September 18, 2008

Statistics
- Daily traffic: 168,000

Location
- Interactive map of Saint Anthony Falls Bridge

The I-35W Saint Anthony Falls Bridge crosses the Mississippi River one-half mile (875 m) downstream from the Saint Anthony Falls in Minneapolis, Minnesota in the U.S., carrying north–south traffic on Interstate 35W. The ten-lane bridge replaced the I-35W Mississippi River bridge, which collapsed on August 1, 2007. It was planned and is maintained by the Minnesota Department of Transportation (MnDOT). The planning, design, and construction processes were completed more quickly than normal because Interstate 35W is a critical artery for commuters and truck freight. The bridge opened September 18, 2008, well ahead of the original goal of December 24.

== Collapse of the previous bridge ==
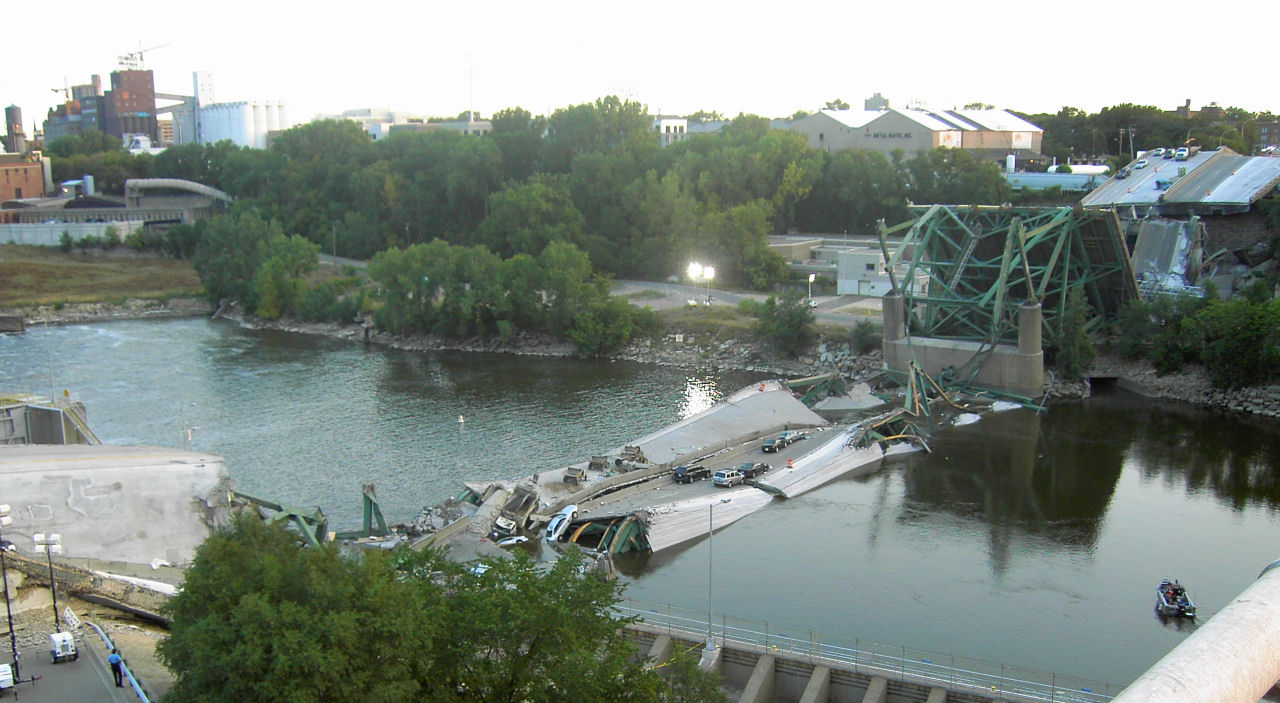
The previous 9340 Bridge, post-collapse

During the evening rush hour at 6:05 pm on August 1, 2007, the main spans of the I-35W Mississippi River bridge in Minneapolis collapsed and fell into the river and onto its banks, killing 13 people and injuring 145. The bridge opened in 1967, and was expected to carry 66,000 vehicles per day. Though intended to last fifty years, it collapsed after forty – approximately ten years short of the end of its useful life.

Originally, the bridge was striped for two lanes in each direction. In 1988, the four shoulders were converted to traffic lanes, accommodating four lanes in each direction. This allowed an increase in traffic flow. By 2004, an estimated 141,000 vehicles crossed the bridge each day.

== Funding ==
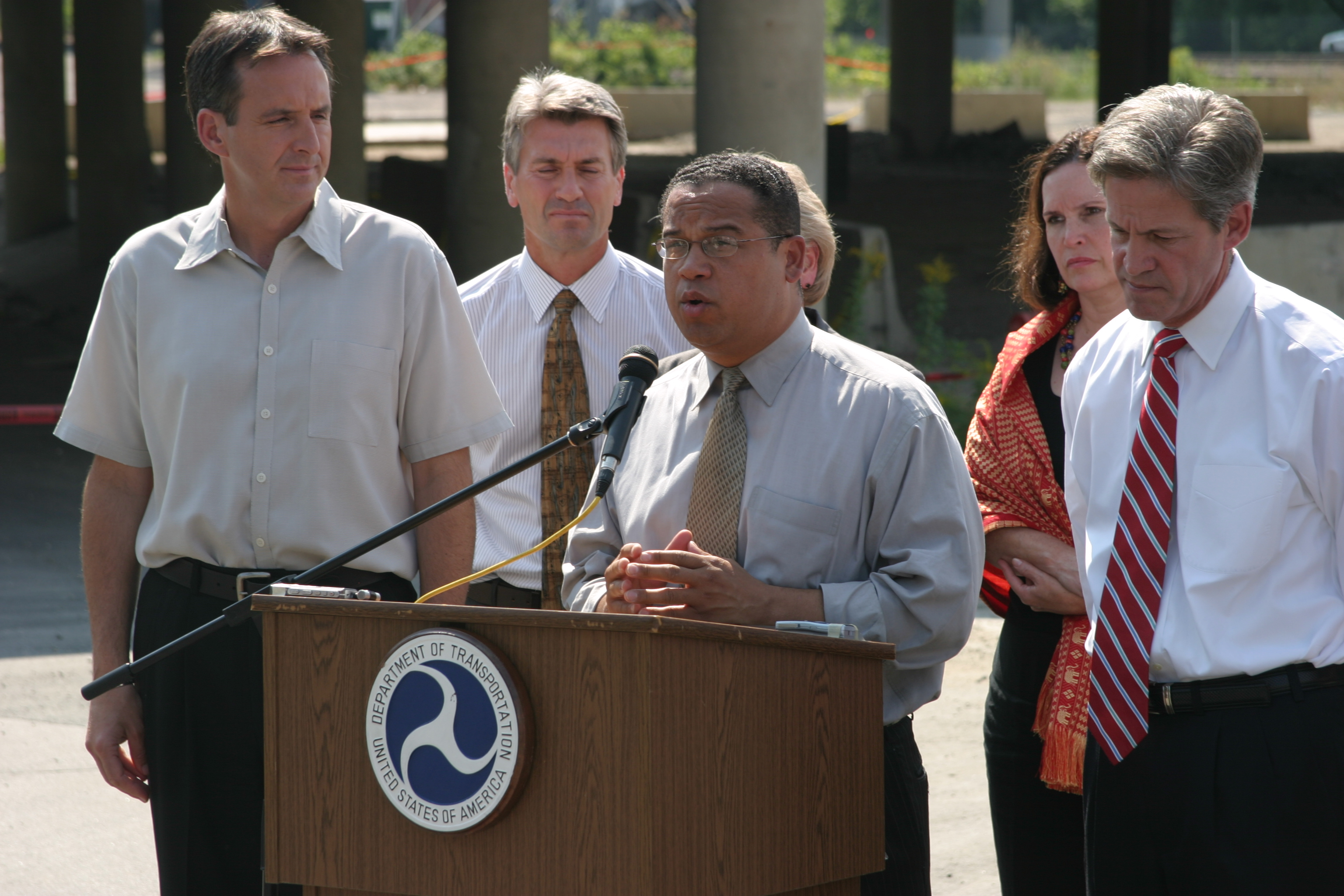
Minnesotans at a US DOT press conference. Left to right: Gov. Tim Pawlenty, Mayor R. T. Rybak, Secretary Mary Peters behind Rep. Keith Ellison (speaking), Rep. Betty McCollum and Sen. Norm Coleman.

Within hours of the previous bridge's demise, politicians pledged to rebuild the bridge at an accelerated pace. Federal transportation officials pledged US$5 million for the cleanup and recovery. U.S. Representative Jim Oberstar, who represented Minnesota's 8th congressional district and chaired the House Transportation Committee, introduced an earmark to direct a minimum of US$250 million to help replace the bridge; the bill passed the House unanimously on August 3 as Republican Senator Norm Coleman and Democratic–Farmer–Labor (DFL) Senator Amy Klobuchar introduced companion legislation in the Senate. President George W. Bush signed the legislation on August 6, 2007, after visiting the site on August 4. After months of wrangling with Congress over spending proposals, President Bush signed the spending bill that included funding for the bridge on December 26, 2007.

== Design debate ==
Minneapolis Mayor R. T. Rybak (DFL) said that future needs and policy considerations shouldn't be ignored in the rush to build a replacement and sought a new bridge able to handle increased traffic as well as mass transit. Meetings between state transportation officials (MnDOT), Rybak, State Transportation Commissioner Carol Molnau, and Governor Tim Pawlenty yielded a desire to build a 10 lane bridge that will last 100 years, with the possibility of bus rapid transit or light rail lines. Rybak said, "Transit needs to play some role in this or otherwise we would need to build a much wider bridge in the future." At a public forum in Roseville, hundreds of Twin Cities residents participated in a discussion about the bridge design. The overriding theme of the crowd was a desire to plan for the bridge's use of mass transit. Commissioner Molnau, in conjunction with Metropolitan Council Chairman Peter Bell, recommended that light rail not be incorporated in the new bridge design. But Pawlenty, responding to constituents and the mayor, directed MnDOT to design the bridge to be light rail-ready. He said the estimated additional US$20 to US$35 million would be paid for by the state.

== Award of contract ==
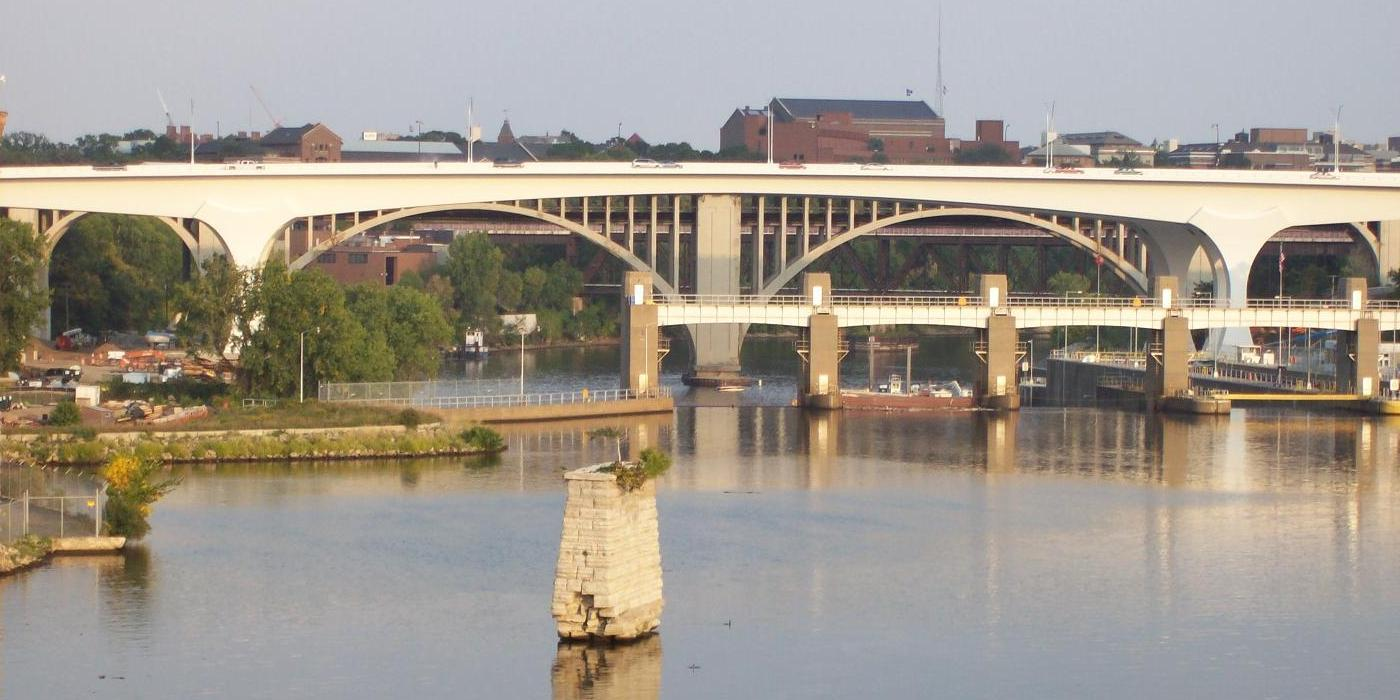
Bridge on September 20, 2008.

After the collapse of the bridge's predecessor, MnDOT announced to potential contractors that they should express their intention to bid on the project by August 8, 2007. A typical bridge project of this scale in Minnesota would be expected to take three years to complete, but state transportation officials hoped to open this replacement bridge in 15 months by using a design/build contract that allowed design and construction of the bridge to proceed concurrently. MnDOT announced on August 9 that five companies/consortia had been approved to bid on the project and requested that the bids be submitted by September 18, 2007.

Flatiron Construction, Inc. and Manson Construction Co. were awarded the contract on September 19, 2007; Flatiron's was the highest-priced and longest schedule of the bids submitted. The lead designer was Figg Engineering, with Ayres Associates providing hydraulic and scour analyses. TKDA of Saint Paul was the engineer of record for the approach highways, second street bridges, retaining walls, lighting, and water resource engineering services on the project. While the total cost was expected to be between US$300 million and US$350 million for the 1,900-foot (579 m) multi-span bridge, including financial incentives for accelerating the schedule, the winning bid was for US$234 million. Disincentives for missing the completion date of December 24, 2008 included a US$200,000 per day penalty, while incentives to finish early could have been as much as US$27 million.

== Construction ==
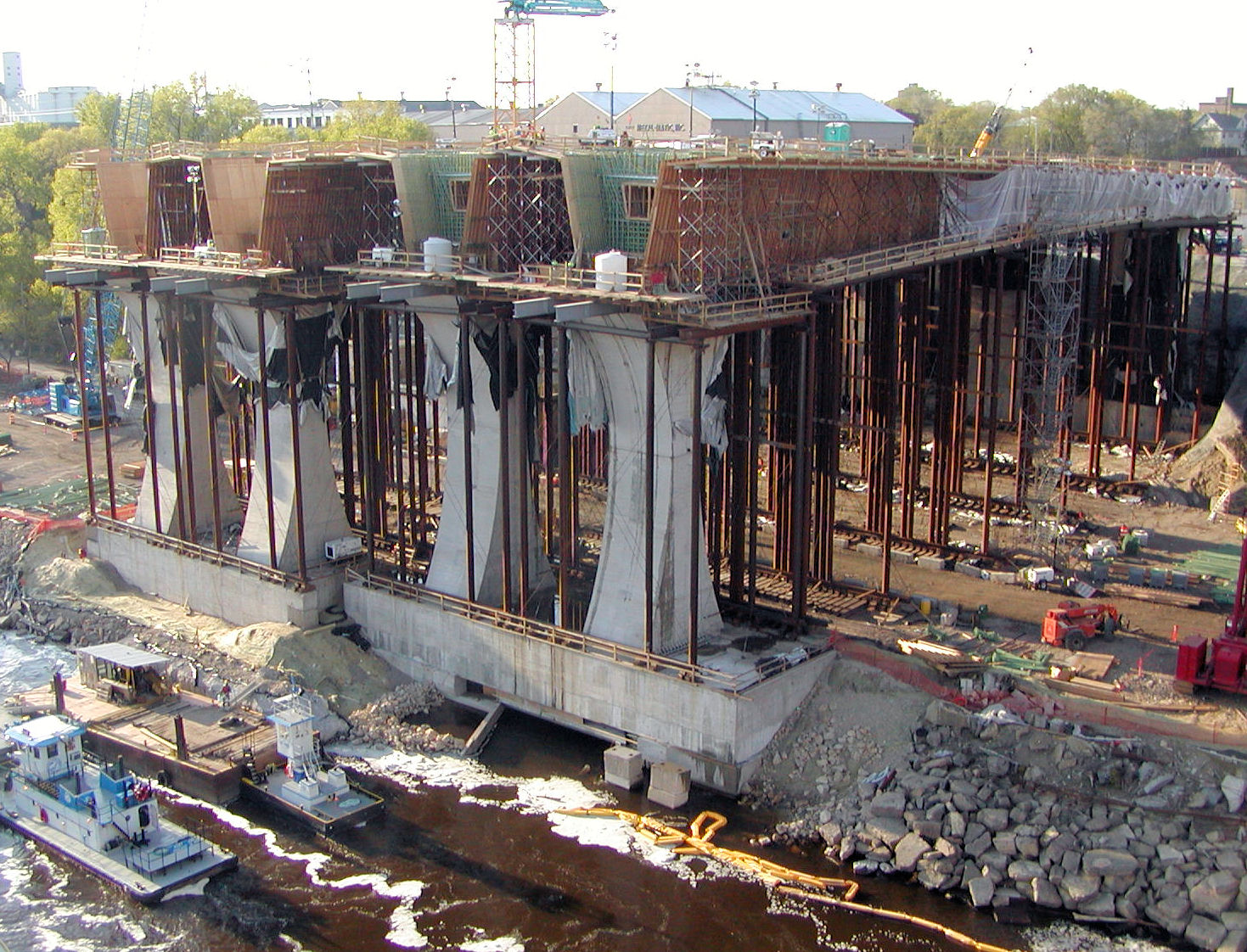
Piers take shape on north shore in May 2008

MnDOT maintained a project page that tracked all activities associated with the construction of the bridge including weekly updates, traffic impacts, construction photos, animations, and virtual walk tours. On December 17, 2007, the first slab of concrete, 200 feet (61 m) long, 13.5 feet (4.1 m) wide, and 4.5 feet (1.4 m) thick, was poured off-site, which began to shape the bridge. Pilings sunk 100 feet (30.5 m) into the earth support the ends of the bridge, which contains 50,000 cubic yards (38,000 m^{3}) of concrete.

The bridge construction progressed more quickly than expected. Construction work was performed in shifts with as many as 400 workers during the day, and 200 at night. On April 8, 2008 MnDOT announced the halfway point of construction had been reached, and predicted that completion might be ahead of schedule by as much as three months.

This prediction was borne out by events, as the Minnesota Department of Transportation opened the bridge to traffic at 5:00 in the morning on September 18, 2008. Minnesota State Patrol cars had been positioned at both the north and south ends, and allowed rush hour traffic to build up behind them. Once the construction barricades were removed at 5:00, first responders, state troopers, and MnDOT trucks slowly crossed the bridge, followed by the rush hour traffic, officially opening the bridge. The US$234 million bridge was completed three months ahead of schedule and on budget, with no lost time due to safety accidents. Flatiron-Manson was expected to earn US$27 million in bonuses for accelerated performance.

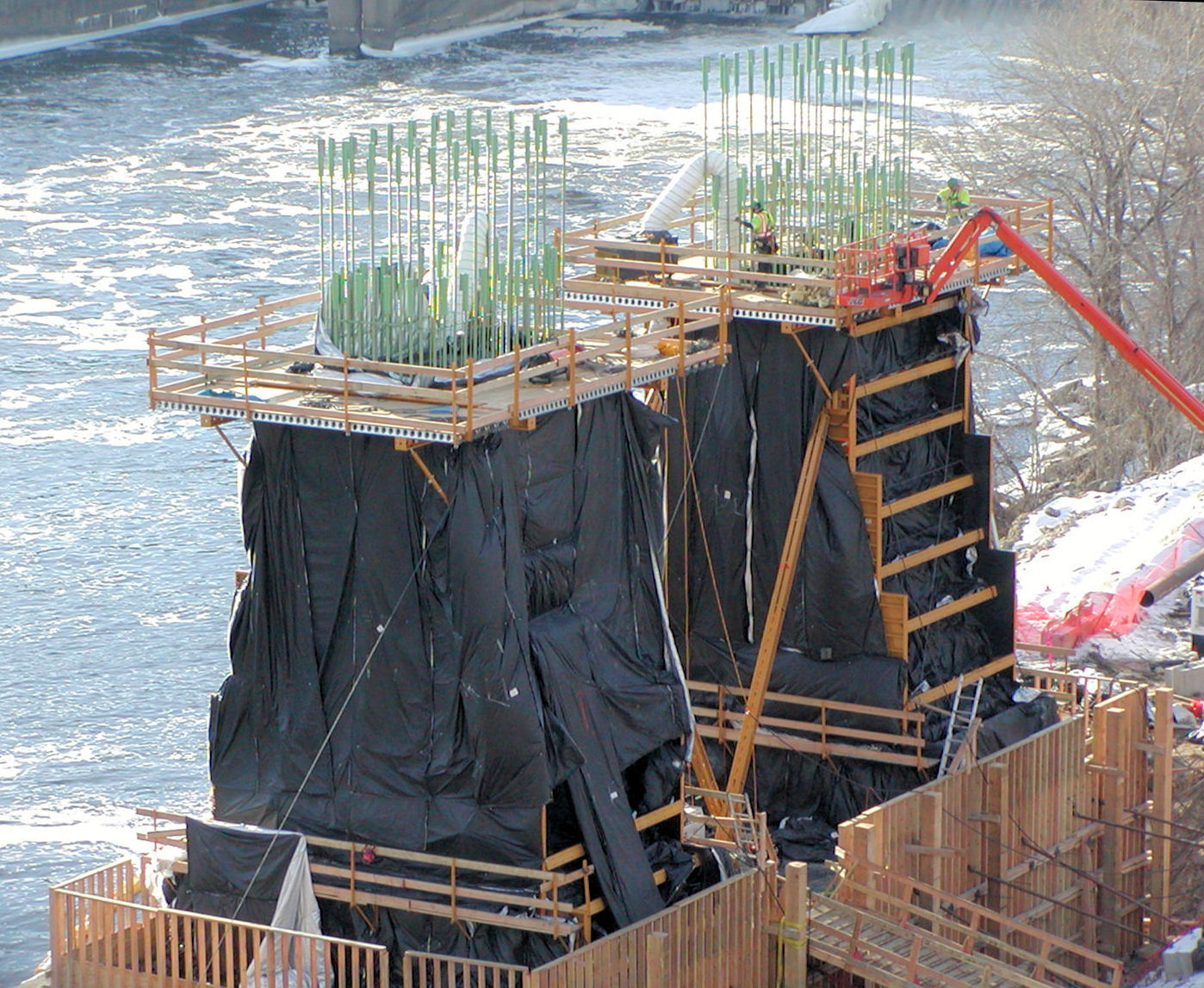
Support posts in construction on the north bank in January 2008

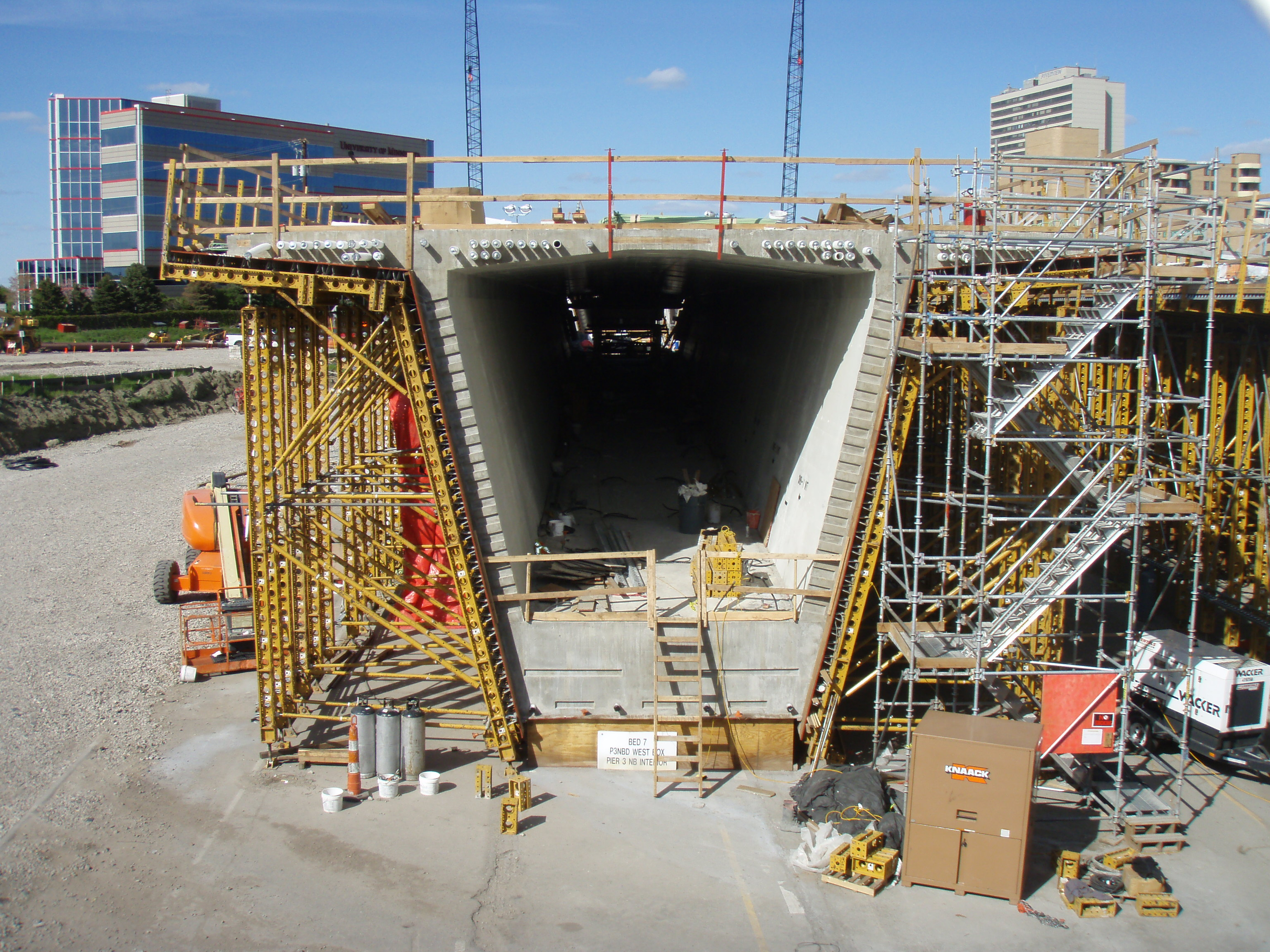
Box girder sections formed in the casting yard (a closed section of the Interstate roadway) in May 2008

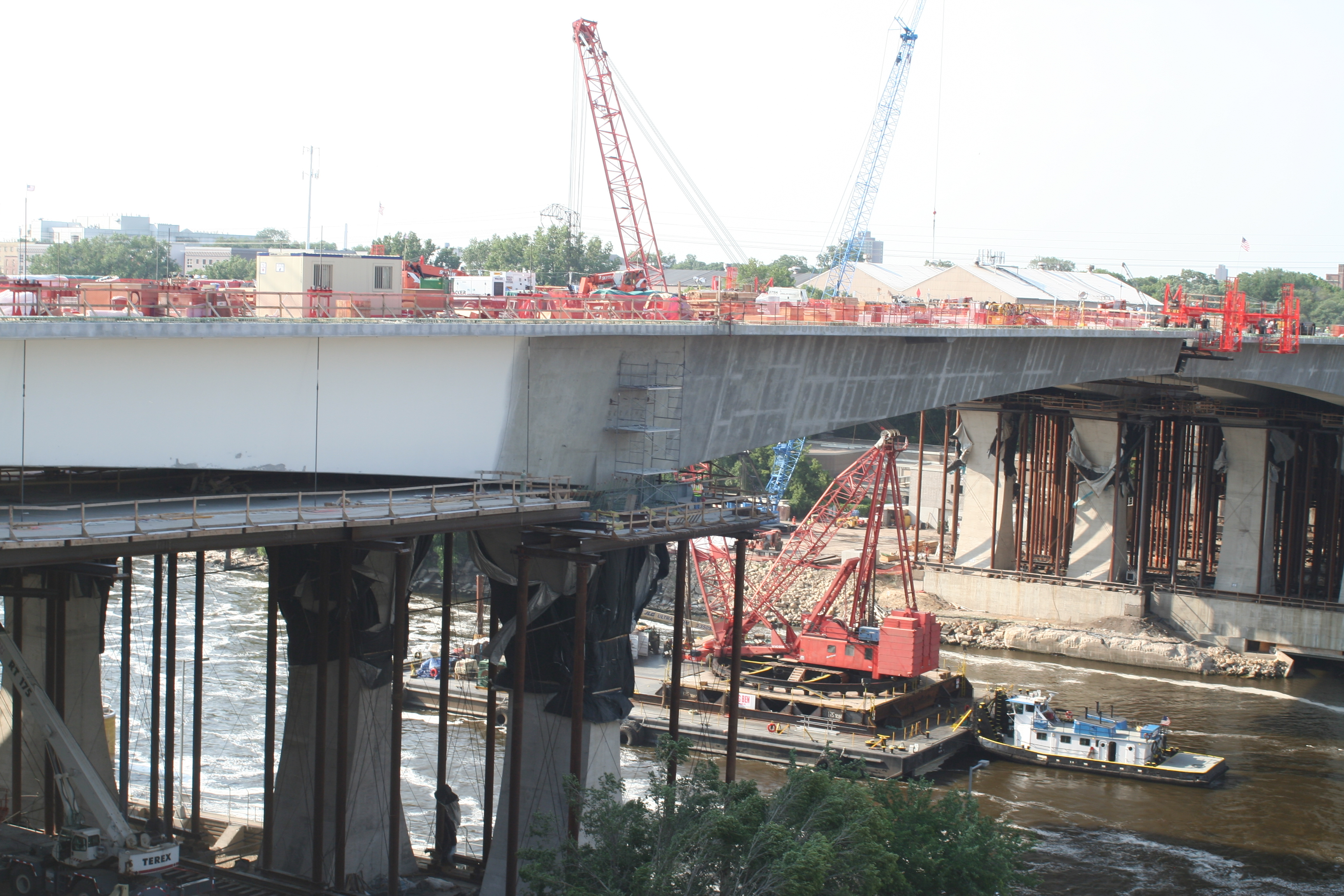
Last segment of northbound lanes in place July 5, 2008.

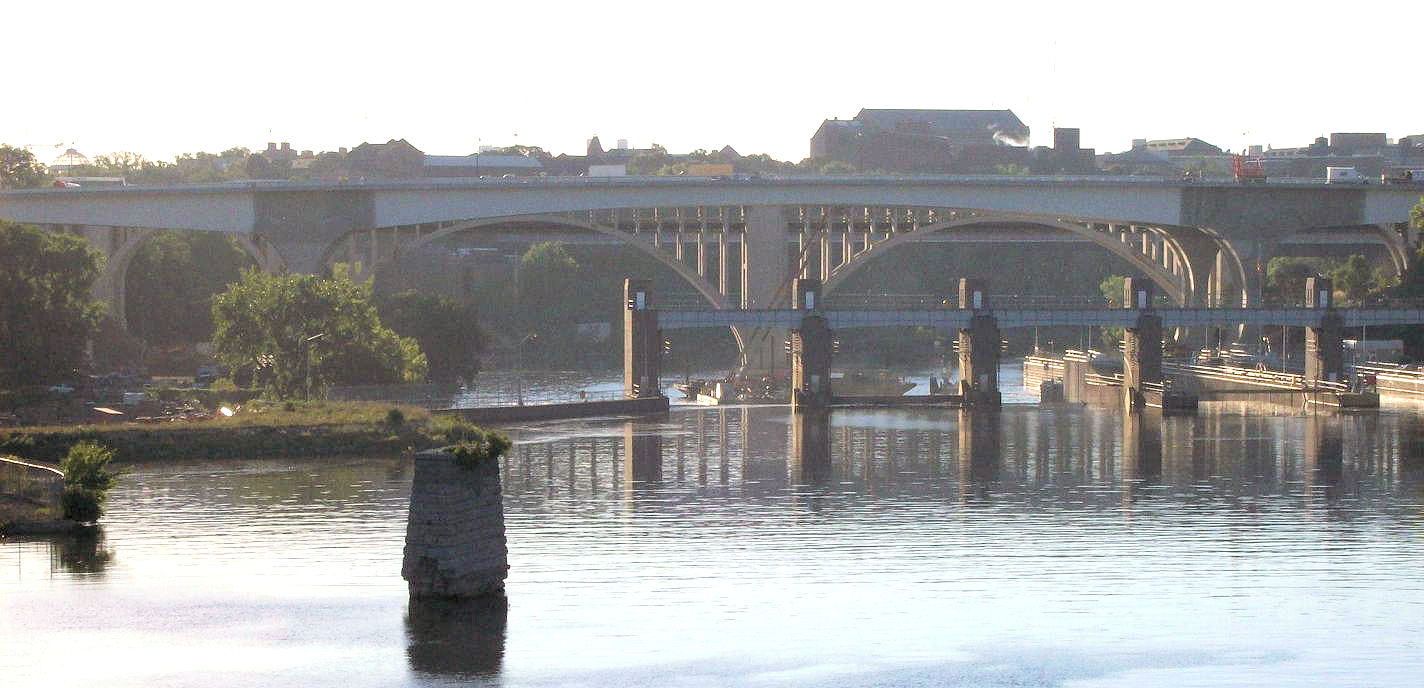
Bridge nearing completion, August 30, 2008.

== Technology ==
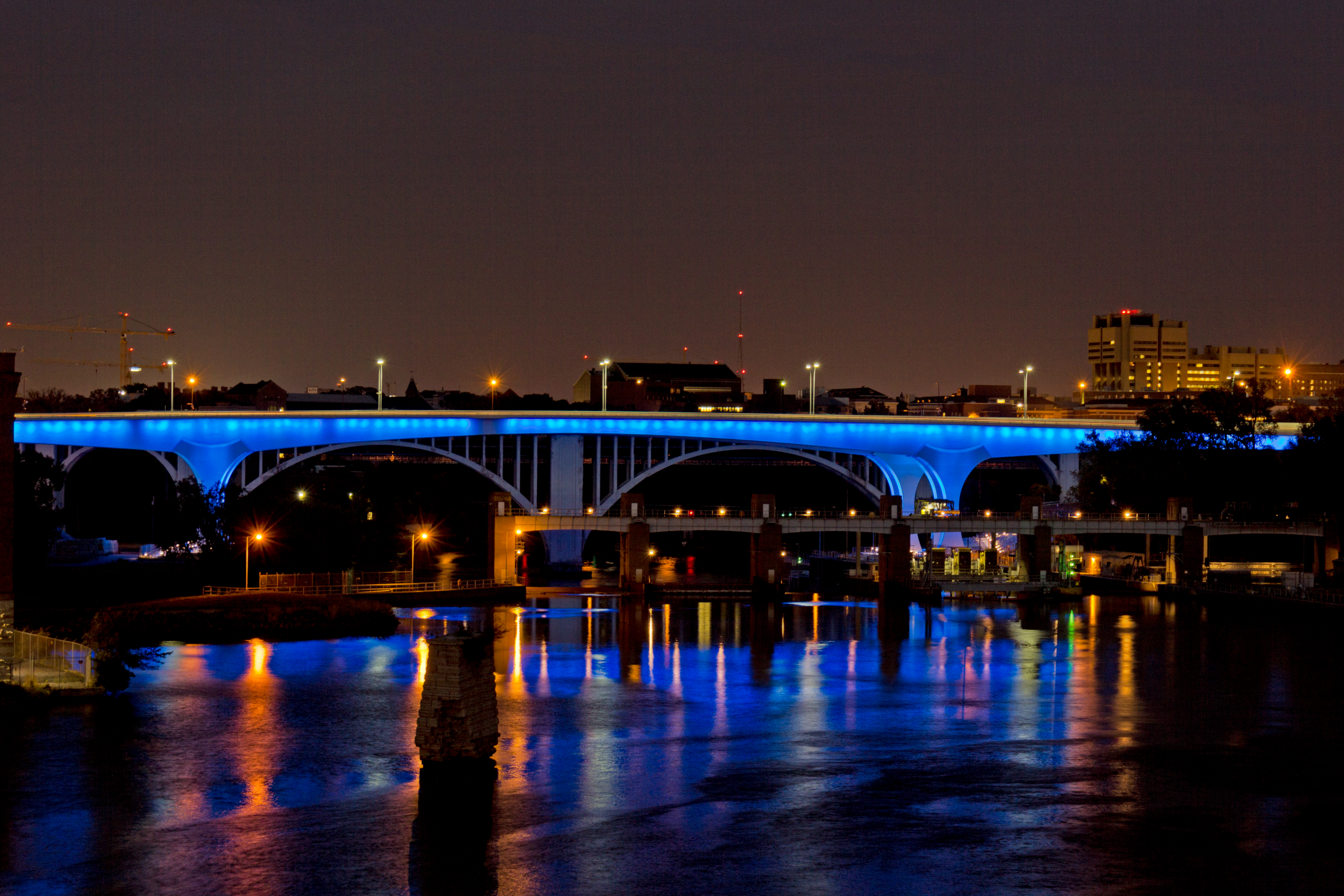

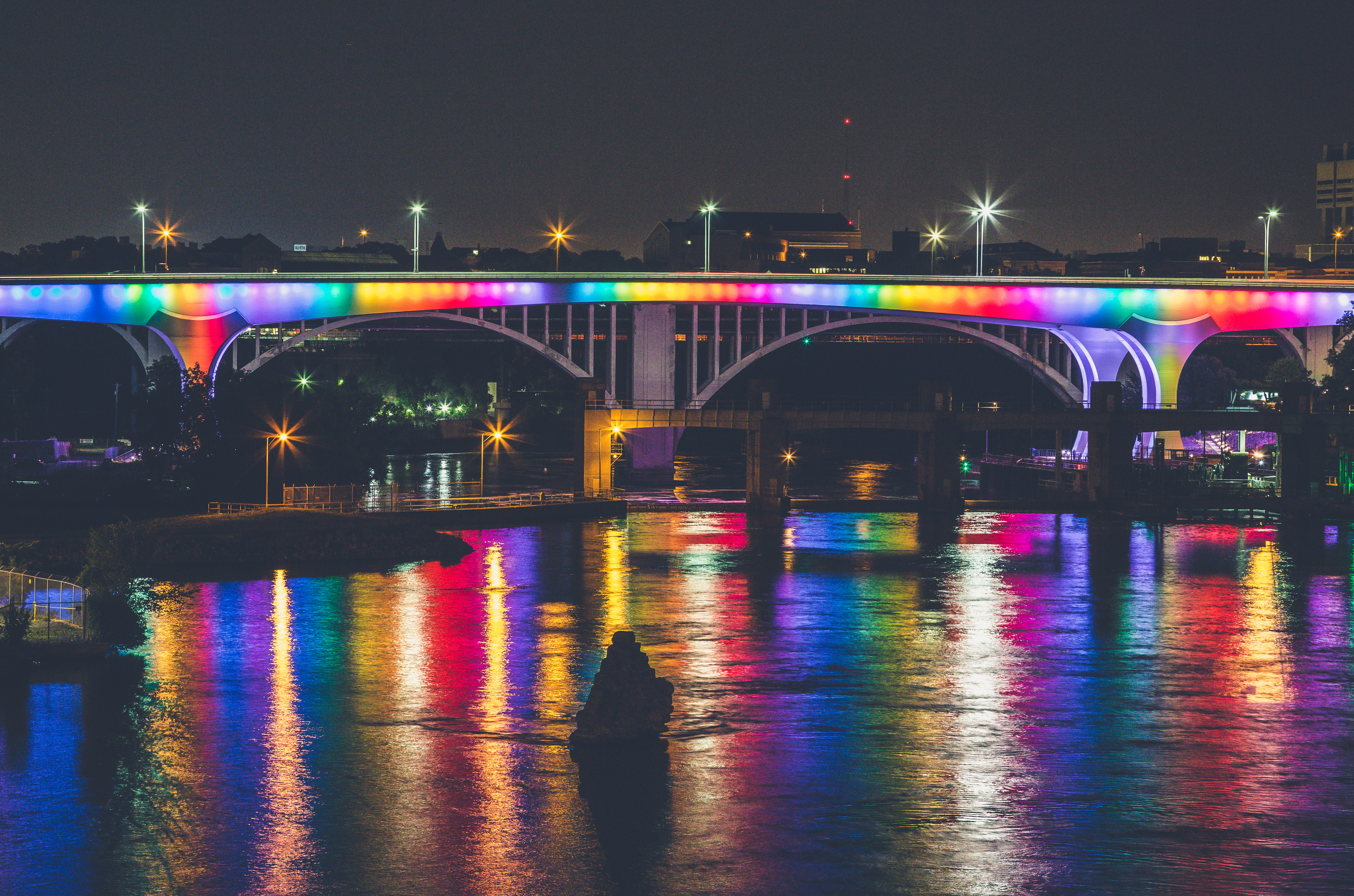
The bridge at night, in its standard blue lighting, and in rainbow colors in honor of Twin Cities Pride.

The bridge is equipped with anti-icing sprayers and was constructed with high-strength concrete. There are 323 sensors that regularly measure bridge conditions such as deck movement, stress, and temperature. The data will be compiled and analyzed by University of Minnesota personnel. The bridge is illuminated with LED lights. Although LED lighting is not generally approved for such highways, this bridge roadway illumination is a test project. The bridge also incorporates multichromatic decorative lighting, which is used to illuminate the structure at night.

The bridge includes two decorative sculptures resembling the symbol for water used on maps, which are built using a special photocatalytic concrete called TX Active. This material reacts with ultraviolet light and pulls pollutant particles of carbon monoxide, sulfur dioxide, and nitrous oxide out of the air and converts them to less harmful substances. The sculptures contain a compound that makes them self-cleaning, so they should stay white for as long as they stand.

In the concrete comprising the drilled shafts, piers and footings, a significant proportion of the Portland cement was replaced with slag, fly ash and other pozzolans. These materials reduce the embodied energy of the structure and allow the concrete to resist the ingress of water and dissolved solids such as chloride ions. This allowed the structure to be designed to resist deterioration for much longer than structures made with conventional concrete.

== Awards ==
The project has won over 20 awards for excellence, including the Federal Highway Administration's Award of Excellence, the FIATECH Celebration of Engineering and Technology Innovation Award, the 2010 Award of Excellence from the Portland Cement Association, and the National Council of Structural Engineers Association's Excellence in Structural Engineering Award. The bridge has been named a project of the year by the American Public Works Association.

The bridge won the 2009 America's Transportation Awards, a prize sponsored by AASHTO, for "representing the best in innovative management, accountability and timeliness".

== See also ==
- List of crossings of the Upper Mississippi River
