= Orange Township, Douglas County, Minnesota =

Orange Township, Minnesota
- Township
- Location within the state of Minnesota Orange Township, Minnesota (the United States)
- Coordinates: 45°48′28″N 95°11′30″W
- Country: United States
- State: Minnesota
- County: Douglas

Area
  - Total: 92.9 km^{2} (35.9 sq mi)
  - Land: 89.2 km^{2} (34.4 sq mi)
  - Water: 3.7 km^{2} (1.4 sq mi)
- Elevation: 414 m (1,358 ft)

Population (2000)
  - Total: 324
  - Density: 3.6/km^{2} (9.3/sq mi)
- Time zone: UTC-6 (Central (CST))
  - Summer (DST): UTC-5 (CDT)
- FIPS code: 27-48472
- GNIS feature ID: 0665212

Orange Township is a township in Douglas County, Minnesota, United States. The population was 351 at the 2020 census.

Orange Township was organized in 1868.

== Geography ==
According to the United States Census Bureau, the township has a total area of 35.9 square miles (92.9 km^{2}), of which 34.5 square miles (89.3 km^{2}) is land and 1.4 square miles (3.7 km^{2}) (3.93%) is water.

== Demographics ==
As of the census of 2000, there were 324 people, 105 households, and 93 families residing in the township. The population density was 9.4 people per square mile (3.6/km^{2}). There were 121 housing units at an average density of 3.5/sq mi (1.4/km^{2}). The racial makeup of the township was 97.84% White, 0.62% African American, 1.23% Native American and 0.31% Asian.

There were 105 households, out of which 40.0% had children under the age of 18 living with them, 80.0% were married couples living together, 3.8% had a female householder with no husband present, and 10.5% were non-families. 8.6% of all households were made up of individuals, and 4.8% had someone living alone who was 65 years of age or older. The average household size was 3.09 and the average family size was 3.22.

In the township the population was spread out, with 29.3% under the age of 18, 7.4% from 18 to 24, 25.9% from 25 to 44, 22.8% from 45 to 64, and 14.5% who were 65 years of age or older. The median age was 37 years. For every 100 females, there were 105.1 males. For every 100 females age 18 and over, there were 110.1 males.

The median income for a household in the township was $46,250, and the median income for a family was $48,750. Males had a median income of $30,625 versus $17,250 for females. The per capita income for the township was $15,837. About 6.9% of families and 7.4% of the population were below the poverty line, including 11.8% of those under age 18 and 13.5% of those age 65 or over.
