= List of state highways in Minnesota =

- Minnesota state highway markers for MN 44 (1920), MN 39 (1934), MN 93 (1948), MN 61 (1969–present)

System information
- Notes: Minnesota's Trunk Highways are state-maintained

Highway names
- Interstates: Interstate X (I-X)
- US Highways: U.S. Highway X (US X)
- State: Trunk Highway X (MN X or TH X)

System links
- Minnesota Trunk Highway System; Interstate; US; State; Legislative; Scenic

The organized system of Minnesota State Highways (typically abbreviated as MN or TH, and called Trunk Highways), the state highway system for the US state of Minnesota, was created in 1920 under the "Babcock Amendment" to the state constitution. No real pattern exists for the numbering of highways. Route commissioning beyond these routes was by legislative action, thus the term legislative route. This included additions and revisions that took place when US and Interstate Highway Systems were commissioned.

Minnesota state highway markers use Type D FHWA font for all route numbers and type C for three-digit route markers only if type D font cannot be used. All routes except interstates use 24-by-24-inch (610 mm × 610 mm) or 36-by-36-inch (910 mm × 910 mm) markers. Interstate markers for three-digit routes are wider shields, 24 by 30 inches (610 mm × 760 mm) and 36 by 45 inches (910 mm × 1,140 mm) respectively.

Although Minnesota state highways do not follow a distinctive pattern in numbering, they are numbered to avoid conflicting with Interstate Highways and US Highways. Any instance of a state number that matches one is often a continuation of the particular route (e.g., U.S. Route 169 and Trunk Highway 169). The Minnesota Department of Transportation (MnDOT) does not consider this a violation of the rule.

== List of highways ==
Number	Length (mi)	Length (km)	Southern or western terminus	Northern or eastern terminus	Formed	Removed	Notes
MN 1	345.954	556.759	ND 54 towards Ardoch, ND	MN 61 at Illgen City	1934	current	
TH 1	—	—	US 65 towards Northwood, IA	Scott Highway towards Thunder Bay, ON	1920	1934	
TH 2	—	—	US 10 towards Fargo, ND	US 61/TH 1 in Duluth	1920	1934	
MN 3	43.749	70.407	MN 21 in Faribault	MN 5 in Saint Paul	1965	current	
MN 3	—	—	ND 13 towards Wahpeton, ND	US 10 in Staples	1920	c. 1955	Became part of MN 210
MN 4	167.136	268.979	Iowa 4 towards Estherville, IA	I-94 southeast of Sauk Centre	1920	current	
TH 5	—	—	US 169 towards Ledyard, IA	US 2/TH 8 in Swan River	1920	1934	
MN 5	76.347	122.869	MN 19/MN 22 in Gaylord	MN 120 at the Maplewood-Oakdale border	1934	current	
MN 6	147.775	237.821	MN 18 northwest of Garrison	US 71 in Big Falls	1934	current	
TH 6	—	—	US 75 towards Rock Rapids, IA	PTH 14 towards Emerson, MB	1920	1934	Became US 75
MN 7	194.174	312.493	MN 28 east of Beardsley	MN 100 in St. Louis Park	1934	current	
TH 7	—	—	US 14 towards Elkton, SD	US 61/TH 3 in Winona	1920	1934	Became US 14
TH 8	—	—	US 2 towards Grand Forks, ND	US 61/TH 1 in Duluth	1920	1934	
MN 9	225.945	363.623	MN 23 in New London	US 2 east of Crookston	1934	current	
TH 9	—	—	US 16 towards Brandon, SD	TH 3 in La Crescent	1920	1934	Became US 16
TH 10	—	—	US 75/TH 6 in Wheaton	US 10/TH 3 in Minneapolis	1920	1934	
MN 11	209.975	337.922	ND 66 towards Drayton, ND	Near Island View	1920	current	
TH 12	—	—	TH 6 near Madison	WIS 12 towards Hudson, WI	1920	1934	
MN 13	111.664	179.706	US 65 in Albert Lea	MN 149 in St. Paul	1920	current	
TH 14	—	—	US 75/TH 6 in Ivanhoe	TH 22 in Gaylord	1920	1934	Renumbered MN 19
MN 15	154.322	248.357	Iowa 15 towards Armstrong, IA	US 10 north of Sauk Rapids	1920	current	
MN 16	87.635	141.035	I-90 in Dexter	US 14/US 61 in La Crescent	1979	current	
TH 16	—	—	US 16/TH 9 in Worthington	US 169/TH 5 near Mankato	1920	1934	
TH 17	—	—	TH 19 near Marshall	US 71 in Willmar	1920	c. 1940	
MN 17	—	—	US 12 in Benson	US 71 west of New London	c. 1940	1962	
MN 17	9.025	14.524	I-90 in Beaver Creek	US 75 in Luverne	1970	1980	
MN 18	78.206	125.860	MN 25 in Brainerd	MN 23 north of Sandstone	1920	current	
MN 19	207.877	334.546	SD 30 towards White, SD	US 61 in Red Wing	1934	current	
TH 19	—	—	US 210/TH 2 near Brainerd	US 2/TH 8 in Cass Lake	1920	1934	Became part of US 371
MN 20	7.471	12.023	MN 19 in Cannon Falls	MN 50 west of Miesville	1920	current	
MN 21	38.370	61.751	MN 60 in Faribault	US 169 in Jordan	1920	current	
MN 22	166.325	267.674	CR R50 (Winnebago County, Iowa) towards Forest City, IA	MN 23 in Richmond	1920	current	
MN 23	339.805	546.863	I-90 west of Beaver Creek	I-35/US 2 in Duluth	1920	current	The highway crosses through Wisconsin for a short distance near Fond du Lac south of Duluth.
MN 24	47.832	76.978	US 12/MN 22 in Litchfield	US 10 in Clear Lake	1920	current	
MN 25	156.066	251.164	US 169 in Belle Plaine	MN 210 in Brainerd	1920	current	
MN 26	21.121	33.991	Iowa 26 in New Albin, IA	MN 16 south of La Crescent	1934	current	
TH 26	—	—	US 75/TH 6 in Ortonville	TH 10 in Benson	1920	1934	Became part of US 12
MN 27	247.623	398.511	MN 28 in Browns Valley	I-35 east of Moose Lake	1934	current	
TH 27	—	—	US 10/TH 3 in St. Cloud	US 210/TH 2 in Brainerd	1920	1934	
MN 28	142.324	229.048	SD 10 towards Sisseton, SD	MN 27 in Little Falls	1920	current	
MN 29	126.592	203.730	US 59/US 212 in Montevideo	US 71 in Wadena	1920	current	
MN 30	265.634	427.496	SD 34 towards Flandreau, SD	MN 43 in Rushford	1934	current	
TH 30	—	—	US 10S/TH 3 in Fergus Falls	US 2/TH 8 east of Erskine	1920	1934	Renumbered MN 73
MN 31	—	—	ND 7 towards Hillsboro, ND	US 371 north of Walker	1920	1969	Became part of MN 200
MN 32	144.845	233.105	MN 34 east of Barnesville	MN 11 in Greenbush	1920	current	
MN 33	19.748	31.781	I-35 in Cloquet	US 53 at Independence	1934	current	
TH 33	—	—	US 75/TH 6 in Warren	TH 32 in Thief River Falls	1920	1934	Renumbered MN 1
MN 34	103.163	166.025	MN 9 in Barnesville	MN 200/MN 371 in Walker	1920	current	
MN 35	36.160	58.194	US 53 in Virginia	MN 1/MN 169 in Tower	1920	1958	
MN 36	21.718	34.952	I-35W in Roseville	WIS 64 towards Somerset, WI	1934	current	
TH 36	—	—	US 10S/TH 3 in Fergus Falls	TH 29 near Henning	1920	1934	Renumbered MN 3
MN 37	28.325	45.585	US 169/MN 73 in Hibbing	MN 135 in Gilbert	1934	current	
TH 37	—	—	TH 27 in Little Falls	US 210/TH 2 in Motley	1920	1934	Became part of US 10
MN 38	46.766	75.263	US 2/US 169 in Grand Rapids	MN 1 in Effie	1934	current	
TH 38	55	89	TH 12 in Montevideo	TH 28 in Starbuck	1920	1934	Renumbered MN 29
MN 39	1.080	1.738	MN 23 in Duluth	WIS 105 in Superior, WI	1943	current	
TH 39	—	—	—	—	1934	c. 1940	
TH 39	—	—	US 16/TH 9 east of Brush Creek	US 14/TH 7 in Mankato	1920	1934	Renumbered MN 22
MN 40	73.874	118.889	SD 20 towards Revillo, SD	CR 5 in Willmar	1934	current	
TH 40	—	—	US 218 towards St. Ansgar, IA	US 14/TH 7 in Owatonna	1920	1934	Became US 218
MN 41	9.382	15.099	US 169 southwest of Shakopee	MN 7 in Shorewood	1934	current	
TH 41	—	—	US 218/TH 40 in Blooming Prairie	TH 56 near Hayfield	1920	1934	Renumbered MN 30
MN 42	30.717	49.434	I-90 south of Eyota	US 61 in Kellogg	1920	current	
MN 43	44.952	72.343	MN 44 in Mabel	WIS 54 towards Galesville, WI	1920	current	
MN 44	35.978	57.901	US 52 southeast of Canton	MN 16 in Hokah	1920	current	
MN 45	2.628	4.229	MN 210 in Carlton	I-35 in Scanlon	1934	current	
TH 45	—	—	US 61/TH 1 in St. Paul	WIS 64 towards Houlton, WI	1920	1934	Became part of US 212
MN 46	46.377	74.637	US 2 west of Deer River	MN 1 in Northome	1934	current	
TH 46	—	—	US 61/TH 1 in Wyoming	US 8 towards St. Croix Falls, WI	1920	1934	Became part of US 8
MN 47	124.186	199.858	MN 65 in Minneapolis	US 169 in Aitkin	1961	current	
MN 47	—	—	SD 34 towards Flandreau, SD	MN 4 north of St. James	1920	1961	Became part of MN 30
MN 48	23.527	37.863	I-35 in Hinckley	WIS 77 towards Minong, WI	1934	current	
TH 48	—	—	US 75/TH 6 north of Canby	TH 17 west of Granite Falls	1920	1934	Renumbered MN 19
MN 49	—	—	—	—	1934	1999	
TH 49	—	—	TH 12 in Montevideo	US 71/TH 4 south of Willmar	1920	1934	
MN 50	15.082	24.272	MN 3 in Farmington	US 61 west of Miesville	1920	current	
MN 51	11.274	18.144	MN 5 in St. Paul	I-694/US 10 in Arden Hills	1934	current	
TH 51	—	—	TH 12 in Chaska	US 169/TH 5 north of Shakopee	1920	1934	Became part of US 212
TH 52	—	—	US 169/TH 5 in Eden Prairie	TH 1 in St. Paul	1920	1934	
TH 53	—	—	US 61/TH 3 in Hastings	TH 12 in St. Paul	1920	1934	
MN 54	10.851	17.463	MN 27 east of Herman	US 59/MN 55 in Elbow Lake	1920	2020	Became Grant CSAH 54
MN 55	218.418	351.510	ND 11 towards Fairmount, ND I-35W/I-94 in Minneapolis	I-94 in Minneapolis US 61 in Hastings	1934	current	
TH 55	—	—	US 61/TH 1 in Scanlon	Cloquet	1920	1934	Renumbered MN 45
MN 56	99.121	159.520	US 63 east of Le Roy	US 52/MN 50 in Hampton	1920	current	
MN 57	25.578	41.164	US 14 in Kasson	US 52 northwest of Zumbrota	1920	current	
MN 58	23.538	37.881	US 52 in Zumbrota	US 61/US 63 in Red Wing	1920	current	
TH 59	—	—	Iowa 59 towards Chester, IA	US 61/TH 3 in Lake City	1920	1934	became US 63
MN 60	221.578	356.595	Iowa 60 towards Sibley, IA	WIS 25 towards Nelson, WI	1920	current	
MN 61	150.321	241.918	I-35 in Duluth	Hwy. 61 towards Thunder Bay, ON	c. 1990	current	formerly US 61
TH 61	—	—	US 2/TH 8 in Deer River	US 71/TH 4 in Big Falls	1920	1934	Renumbered MN 6
MN 62	23.992	38.611	US 59 in Fulda	US 71/MN 60 in Windom	1934	current	Western segment
MN 62	17.595	28.316	I-494 in Eden Prairie	I-494 in Inver Grove Heights	1988	current	Eastern segment
TH 62	—	—	US 10/TH 3 in St. Paul	US 10/TH 3 in Anoka	1920	1934	Became part of US 10
TH 63	—	—	TH 27 south of Kettle River	US 53 south of Gheen	1934	1935	Renumbered MN 73
TH 63	—	—	US 10/TH 3 in Minneapolis	US 61/TH 1 south of Forest Lake	1920	1934	Became part of US 8
MN 64	64.817	104.313	MN 210 northeast of Motley	MN 200 west of Laporte	1934	current	
TH 64	—	—	TH 30 north of Fergus Falls	US 75/TH 6 south of Moorhead	1920	1934	Became part of US 52
MN 65	270.775	435.770	Minneapolis	US 71 in Littlefork	1934	current	
TH 65	—	—	TH 32 south of Red Lake Falls	US 2/TH 8 in Bagley	1920	1934	Renumbered MN 92
MN 66	12.059	19.407	Good Thunder	US 169/MN 60 in Mankato	1961	2016	Became Blue Earth CSAH 1
MN 66	—	—	MN 56 east of Isle	US 61 east of Finlayson	1934	1961	
TH 66	—	—	TH 12 in Montevideo	TH 26 north of Appleton	1920	1934	Renumbered MN 7
MN 67	83.026	133.617	US 75 northeast of Canby	MN 68 in Morgan	1920	current	
MN 68	141.026	226.959	SD 22 towards Clear Lake, SD	US 169/MN 60 southwest of Mankato	1920	current	
TH 69	—	—	US 2 west of Hermantown	US 61 in Duluth	1934	1935	Renumbered MN 94
TH 69	—	—	TH 4 in Paynesville	TH 25 in Buffalo	1920	1934	Renumbered MN 55
MN 70	29.333	47.207	MN 65 south of Mora	WIS 70 towards Grantsburg, WI	1934	current	
TH 70	—	—	US 14/TH 7 in Sleepy Eye	TH 12 in Hector	1920	1934	Renumbered MN 4
TH 71	—	—	TH 27 in Little Falls	TH 5 in McGrath	1923	1924	Found unconstitutional; reinstated as in 1934 as part of MN 27
MN 72	76.810	123.614	US 71 in Blackduck	Hwy 11 towards Rainy River, ON	1923	current	
MN 73	119.697	192.634	I-35 southeast of Moose Lake	US 53 south of Gheen	1935	current	
TH 73	—	—	Iowa 73 towards Allendorf, IA	Red River of the North at St. Vincent	1934	1935	Renumbered US 59
MN 74	34.956	56.256	US 52/MN 30 in Chatfield	US 61 at Weaver	1934	current	
MN 76	36.767	59.171	Iowa 76 towards Waukon, IA	I-90 west of Dakota	1934	current	
MN 77	10.495	16.890	Apple Valley	MN 62 in Minneapolis	1980	current	
MN 78	46.694	75.147	MN 79 near Erdahl	US 10 in Perham	1934	current	
MN 79	12.128	19.518	US 59/MN 55 in Elbow Lake	I-94 west of Evansville	1934	current	
MN 80	8.431	13.568	MN 16 south of Wykoff	US 52 in Fountain	1945	current	
TH 80	—	—	US 16 in Wykoff	US 52 in Preston	1934	1945	Became part of US 16 (now MN 16)
MN 81	—	—	US 75 north of Hendrum	US 2 in Crookston	1934	1955	Became part of US 75
MN 81	—	—	I-94 in Minneapolis	MN 100 in Crystal	1985	1988	
MN 82	—	—	MN 3 in Breckenridge	US 75 in Ada	1934	1955	Became part of MN 9
MN 83	23.760	38.238	MN 30 south of Waldorf	MN 22 in Mankato	1934	current	
MN 84	29.865	48.063	MN 371 in Pine River	MN 200 north of Longville	1934	current	
MN 85	—	—	US 371 near Leech Lake	US 71 east of Lake George	1934	c. 1949	
MN 86	22.850	36.774	Iowa 86 towards Spirit Lake, IA	MN 60 east of Wilder	1934	current	
MN 87	83.211	133.915	US 10 southwest of Frazee	MN 84 east of Backus	1934	current	
MN 88	—	—	MN 218 in Eagan	MN 5 in St. Paul	1934	c. 1950	
MN 88	—	—	I-35W in Minneapolis	I-35W in New Brighton	c. 1980	1996	
MN 89	143.627	231.145	US 2 northeast of Wilton	Hwy. 89 towards Piney, MB	1934	current	
MN 90	—	—	MN 121 in Minneapolis	MN 36 in Minneapolis	1934	1958	Renumbered MN 190
MN 91	61.456	98.904	CR L14 towards George, IA	MN 23 in Russell	1934	current	
MN 92	71.526	115.110	MN 32 south of Red Lake Falls	MN 200 south of Bagley	1934	current	
MN 93	5.599	9.011	MN 112 in Le Sueur	MN 19 in Henderson	1961	current	
MN 93	—	—	US 71 in Redwood Falls	MN 4 north of Sleepy Eye	1934	1961	
TH 94	—	—	US 61 north of Hastings	WIS 34 towards Prescott, WI	1934	1935	Became part of US 10
MN 94	17.392	27.990	US 2 in Solway Township	MN 281 in Duluth	1935	1958	Renumbered MN 194
MN 95	126.842	204.132	MN 23 east of Sauk Rapids	US 10/US 61 in Cottage Grove	1934	current	
MN 96	1.225	1.971	US 61 in White Bear Lake	MN 244 in Dellwood	1934	current	
MN 97	13.173	21.200	I-35 in Columbus	MN 95 north of Marine on St. Croix	1934	current	
MN 98	—	—	US 61 in Forest Lake	US 8 in Chisago City	1934	1955	Became part of US 8
MN 98	—	—	US 61 in Wyoming	US 8 in Chisago City	1955	1996	
MN 99	40.827	65.705	US 14 west of Nicollet	MN 21 northwest of Faribault	1934	current	
MN 100	16.178	26.036	I-494/MN 5 in Bloomington	I-694 in Brooklyn Center	1934	current	
MN 101	14.061	22.629	Chanhassen I-94 in Rogers	Eden Prairie US 10/US 169 in Elk River	1934	current	
MN 102	19.297	31.056	MN 32 north of Fertile	MN 9 southeast of Crookston	1934	current	
MN 103	—	—	US 75 in Ortonville	MN 28 in Beardsley	1934	1955	
MN 103	—	—	—	—	c. 1990	1995	
MN 104	27.320	43.967	MN 9 in Sunburg	MN 28/MN 29 in Glenwood	1934	current	
MN 105	13.645	21.959	CR S70 towards St. Ansgar, IA	I-90 in Austin	1934	current	
MN 106	7.365	11.853	MN 29 in Deer Creek	US 10 southeast of New York Mills	1934	current	
MN 107	17.571	28.278	MN 65 southwest of Braham	MN 23 southwest of Brook Park	1934	current	
MN 108	61.371	98.767	I-94 northwest of Rothsay	MN 210 in Henning	1934	current	
MN 109	32.833	52.840	US 169 in Winnebago	I-90 in Alden	1934	current	
MN 110	5.245	8.441	MN 55 in Mendota Heights	I-494 in Inver Grove Heights	1965	2018	Renumbered as a part of MN 62
MN 110	—	—	MN 7 in St. Bonifacius	US 12 in Maple Plain	1934	1955	
MN 111	9.789	15.754	US 14 in Nicollet	MN 22 northwest of St. Peter	1934	current	
MN 112	15.012	24.159	US 169 in Le Sueur	MN 99 west of Le Center	1934	2019	Became Le Sueur CSAH 22
MN 113	54.592	87.857	MN 32 at Syre	US 71 north of Park Rapids	1934	current	
MN 114	19.955	32.114	MN 28/MN 29 in Starbuck	I-94 west of Alexandria	1934	current	
MN 115	8.736	14.059	US 10 in Randall	MN 371 north of Little Falls	1934	current	
MN 116	—	—	ND 7 towards Hillsboro, ND	MN 81 in Halstad	1934	1955	
MN 116	—	—	—	—	1965	1976	
MN 117	1.797	2.892	SD 19 towards Sisseton, SD	MN 27 southwest of Wheaton	1934	current	
TH 118	18.25	29.37	MN 95 in Cambridge	MN 65 west of Brunswick	1934	1943	
MN 118	—	—	—	—	1975	1999	
MN 119	15.108	24.314	US 212 in Dawson	US 12 north of Appleton	1934	current	
MN 120	7.341	11.814	I-94 in Maplewood	MN 244 in White Bear Lake	1965	current	Removed by the legislature in 2001, so proposed to be eliminated
MN 121	0.937	1.508	I-35W/MN 62 in Richfield	Minneapolis	1934	current	
MN 122	0.69	1.11	I-35W in Minneapolis	US 52 in Minneapolis	1988	1998	
MN 123	8.037	12.934	MN 23 in Sandstone	MN 23 west of Askov	1945	current	
MN 124	—	—	—	—	1965	2002	
MN 127	2.531	4.073	I-94 south of Osakis	MN 27 in Osakis	1965	2013	
MN 135	36.160	58.194	US 53 in Virginia	MN 1/MN 169 in Tower	1958	current	
MN 139	3.913	6.297	Iowa 139 towards Cresco, IA	US 52 in Harmony	1934	current	
MN 149	9.924	15.971	MN 3 in Inver Grove Heights	MN 5 in St. Paul	c. 1980	current	
MN 152	—	—	US 52 in Minneapolis	US 10 in Sauk Rapids	1934	1988	
MN 156	4.201	6.761	I-494 in South St. Paul	US 52 in St. Paul	1993	current	
MN 165	—	—	—	—	1934	1955	
MN 167	7.304	11.755	MN 23 in Granite Falls	Upper Sioux Agency State Park	2022	current	
MN 169	48.884	78.671	US 53 north of Virginia	Near Section Thirty	1934	current	
MN 171	1.886	3.035	ND 59 towards Pembina, ND	US 75 east of St. Vincent	1936	current	
MN 172	11.515	18.532	MN 11 west of Baudette	Near Hackett	1961	current	
MN 175	21.200	34.118	ND 5 towards Hamilton, ND	US 59 northwest of Lake Bronson	1965	current	
MN 190	—	—	—	—	1955	c. 1980	
MN 194	17.392	27.990	US 2 in Solway Township	I-35 in Duluth	1958	current	
MN 197	6.997	11.261	US 2/US 71 south of Bemidji	US 2 in Bemidji	1985	current	
MN 200	201.203	323.805	ND 200 towards Hillsboro, ND	US 2 northwest of Floodwood	1965	current	
MN 201	—	—	—	—	1961	1987	
MN 202	—	—	—	—	1965	1965	
MN 210	227.993	366.919	ND 210 in Wahpeton, ND	MN 23 in Duluth	1975	current	
MN 212	—	—	—	—	1935	1985	
MN 216	—	—	—	—	1949	1965	
MN 217	17.342	27.909	MN 65 in Littlefork	US 53 southeast of International Falls	1949	current	
MN 218	—	—	—	—	1934	1961	
MN 219	15.331	24.673	MN 1 south of Goodridge	MN 89 west of Grygla	1949	current	
MN 220	78.536	126.391	US 75 in Climax	MN 11 east of Robbin	1949	current	
MN 221	—	—	—	—	1949	1955	
MN 222	1.474	2.372	MN 92 south of Oklee	Oklee	1949	2023	
MN 223	7.643	12.300	MN 92 south of Clearbrook	Leonard	1949	current	
MN 224	—	—	—	—	1949	2005	
MN 225	8.809	14.177	Ponsford	MN 34 at Osage	1949	2017	
MN 226	1.494	2.404	MN 34 east of Park Rapids	Dorset	1949	current	
MN 227	10.680	17.188	US 71 in Sebeka	Nimrod	1949	2012	
MN 228	7.785	12.529	Vergas	US 10 northwest of Perham	1949	2015	
MN 231	—	—	US 10	I-94	c. 1960	1985	now BL I-94
MN 232	9.540	15.353	Palisade	MN 65 north of McGregor	1949	2012	
MN 235	10.027	16.137	Urbank	MN 29 in Parkers Prairie	1949	2013	
MN 236	—	—	—	—	1949	1987	
MN 237	2.754	4.432	New Munich	I-94 east of Melrose	1949	2025	
MN 238	34.709	55.859	I-94 in Albany	MN 27/MN 28 west of Little Falls	1949	current	
MN 240	17.1	27.5	MN 55 in Annandale	US 10 in Clear Lake	1949	1961	Became part of MN 24
MN 241	3.531	5.683	St. Michael	I-94 in St. Michael	1955	current	
MN 242	5.2	8.4	US 10/MN 47 in Coon Rapids	MN 65 in Blaine	1949	2007	
MN 243	1.233	1.984	MN 95 southwest of Taylors Falls	WIS 243 in Osceola, WI	1949	current	
MN 244	4.705	7.572	MN 120 in White Bear Lake	MN 96 in Dellwood	1949	current	Removed by the legislature in 2001, so proposed to be eliminated
MN 246	18.221	29.324	MN 3 in Northfield	MN 56 north of Kenyon	1949	current	
MN 247	12.604	20.284	US 63 north of Rochester	MN 42 in Plainview	1949	current	
MN 248	11.219	18.055	Altura	US 61 northwest of Minnesota City	1949	current	
MN 249	—	—	—	—	1949	1989	
MN 250	9.479	15.255	MN 16 in Lanesboro	MN 30 west of Rushford	1949	current	
MN 251	16.374	26.351	I-35 east of Clarks Grove	US 218 north of Austin	1949	current	
MN 252	4.353	7.005	I-94/I-694 in Brooklyn Center	MN 610 in Brooklyn Park	1985	current	
MN 252	—	—	—	—	1965	1967	
MN 253	6.472	10.416	Bricelyn	I-90 east of Blue Earth	1949	2019	Became Faribault CSAH 23
MN 254	4.796	7.718	Frost	I-90 east of Blue Earth	1949	2019	Became Faribault CSAH 17
MN 256	—	—	—	—	1949	1965	
MN 257	3.991	6.423	Hanska	MN 15 east of Hanska	1949	current	
MN 258	10.811	17.399	Comfrey	US 14 northeast of Springfield	1949	2013	
MN 259	—	—	—	—	1949	1965	
MN 261	—	—	—	—	1949	1997	
MN 262	2.050	3.299	I-90 east of Fairmont	Granada	1949	2007	
MN 263	11.226	18.066	Ceylon	I-90 north of Welcome	1949	2025	
MN 264	7.394	11.899	Round Lake	I-90 east of Worthington	1949	current	
MN 266	—	—	—	—	1949	2004	Became Nobles CSAH 25
MN 267	5.353	8.615	Iona	MN 30 west of Slayton	1949	current	
MN 268	—	—	US 75	Edgerton	1949	2005	Became Pipestone CSAH 9
MN 269	2.653	4.270	SD 11 towards Garretson, SD	MN 23 in Jasper	1949	current	
MN 270	7.659	12.326	Hills	US 75 south of Luverne	1949	current	
MN 271	8.591	13.826	MN 19 west of Ivanhoe	SD 28 towards Astoria, SD	1949	current	
MN 272	—	—	MN 19 east of Marshall	MN 93 in Morgan	1949	1963	Became part of MN 68
MN 273	—	—	MN 19 west of Redwood Falls	Belview	1949	2004	Became Redwood CSAH 7
MN 274	8.515	13.704	Wood Lake	MN 23 south of Granite Falls	1949	2022	Mostly became part of MN 67; rest turned back
MN 275	6.519	10.491	Boyd	US 212 east of Dawson	1949	2017	Became Lac qui Parle CSAH 29
MN 277	11.025	17.743	MN 7 west of Clara City	MN 40 east of Milan	1949	2019	Became Chippewa CSAH 4
MN 278	—	—	MN 100 in Robbinsdale	MN 152 in Minneapolis	1949	1982	
MN 280	3.710	5.971	I-94 in St. Paul	I-35W in Roseville	1955	current	
MN 281	—	—	—	—	1949	1965	
MN 282	7.655	12.320	US 169 in Jordan	MN 13 southwest of Prior Lake	1949	current	
MN 284	5.651	9.094	US 212 south of Cologne	MN 5 in Waconia	1949	current	
MN 286	4.302	6.923	MN 6 at Talmoon	MN 38 at Marcell	1949	current	
MN 287	14.423	23.212	MN 28 in Grey Eagle	US 71 in Long Prairie	1949	current	
MN 288	—	—	—	—	1951	1999	
MN 289	0.512	0.824	MN 73 in Moose Lake	Minnesota Correctional Facility - Moose Lake	1951	current	
MN 290	0.400	0.644	Ah-Gwah-Ching Center	MN 200/MN 371 southeast of Walker	1951	2009	
MN 291	1.318	2.121	US 61 in Hastings	Minnesota Veterans Home - Hastings	1951	c. 2014	
MN 292	1.307	2.103	Minnesota Correctional Facility - Red Wing	US 61/US 63 in Red Wing	1951	current	
MN 293	1.683	2.709	Cambridge	MN 95 in Cambridge	1951	2009	
MN 294	1.646	2.649	Willmar State Hospital	US 71/MN 23	1951	2006	
MN 295	1.160	1.867	Minnesota Security Hospital	US 169 in St. Peter	1951	c. 2010	
MN 296	—	—	—	—	1951	1989	
MN 297	0.475	0.764	Fergus Falls	Fergus Falls State Hospital	1951	2010	
MN 298	1.092	1.757	Minnesota Correctional Facility - Faribault and Minnesota State Academy for the Blind	MN 60/MN 299 in Faribault	1951	current	
MN 299	0.674	1.085	MN 60/MN 298 in Faribault	Minnesota State Academy for the Deaf	1951	current	
MN 300	—	—	—	—	1951	1998	
MN 301	1.059	1.704	Minnesota Correctional Facility - St. Cloud	US 10 in St. Cloud	1951	current	
MN 302	—	—	—	—	1951	2003	
MN 303	—	—	—	—	1951	1973	
MN 308	1.277	2.055	MN 11 northeast of Badger	MN 89 west of Roseau	1955	current	
MN 309	0.274	0.441	MN 18 southeast of Brainerd	MN 18 southeast of Brainerd	1955	2014	
MN 310	10.495	16.890	MN 11/MN 89 in Roseau	Hwy. 310 towards South Junction, MB	1959	current	
MN 312	—	—	—	—	2002	2008	
MN 313	6.267	10.086	MN 11 in Warroad	Hwy. 12 towards Winnipeg, MB	1959	current	
MN 316	9.809	15.786	US 61 west of Red Wing	US 61 in Hastings	1959	current	
MN 317	1.444	2.324	ND 17 towards Grafton, ND	MN 220 north of Oslo	1959	current	
MN 318	—	—	—	—	1959	1986	
MN 322	—	—	—	—	1955	c. 2000	
MN 323	—	—	—	—	2009	2010	
MN 324	—	—	—	—	1965	2003	
MN 326	—	—	—	—	1963	1969	
MN 329	1.112	1.790	US 59 in Morris	West Central Experiment Station	c. 1970	current	
MN 330	2.020	3.251	US 14	University of Minnesota Southwest Research and Outreach Center	1971	current	
MN 332	7.220	11.619	US 71/MN 11 south of International Falls	MN 11 in International Falls	1976	2011	
MN 333	0.492	0.792	Minnesota Security Hospital	MN 99 in St. Peter	1985	c. 2010	
MN 336	2.249	3.619	I-94 east of Moorhead	US 10 east of Dilworth	1995	current	
MN 361	7.177	11.550	I-35 in Rush City	MN 70 in Rock Creek	1965	2011	
MN 371	107.411	172.861	US 10 in Little Falls	US 2 in Cass Lake	1975	current	Former US 371
MN 610	9.828	15.817	I-94 in Maple Grove	US 10/MN 47 in Coon Rapids	1975	current	
Former

== Other state highways ==
Special routes

Number	Length (mi)	Length (km)	Southern or western terminus	Northern or eastern terminus	Formed	Removed	Notes
Bus. MN 23	4.65	7.48	—	—	—	—	Serves Willmar
Bus. MN 371	6.526	10.503	MN 371 southwest of Brainerd	MN 210 in Brainerd	2000	current	Only state-maintained business route

There are also routes officially numbered in the 805 and 905, but they do not have signage. Examples include part of the Sibley Memorial Highway that was bypassed in Mendota in the mid 1995 (MN 913A, numbered for former designation MN 13), and Robert Street between I-494 and University Avenue in St. Paul and West St. Paul (MN 952, numbered for former designation US 52).

Other roads under Minnesota jurisdiction include the MN 371 Business Route, which follows the former route of MN 371 through Brainerd. MN 23 also has a designated business route through the city of Willmar (as MN 23 is bypassed around the city), but unlike Business MN 371, Business MN 23 is under local jurisdiction.

Legislative routes defined in the Minnesota Constitution were signed until 1934, when many were renumbered. Several routes, like US Highway 208, were planned in the 1934 renumbering but eliminated before the final plan.
