= Columbus, Minnesota =

City in Minnesota, United States

Columbus
- City
- Motto: "Rural Nature. Urban Access."
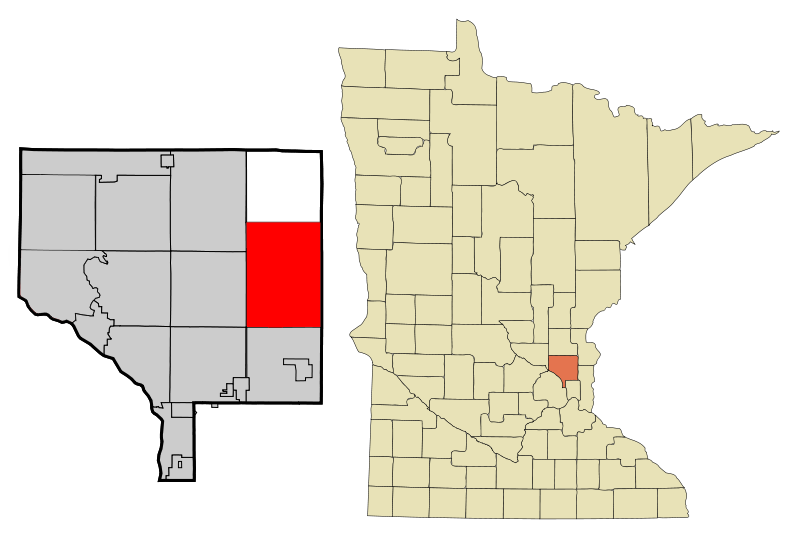
- Location of the city of Columbus within Anoka County, Minnesota
- Coordinates: 45°16′06″N 93°04′51″W
- Country: United States
- State: Minnesota
- County: Anoka
- Incorporated: September 21, 2006

Area
  - Total: 47.69 sq mi (123.51 km^{2})
  - Land: 44.85 sq mi (116.16 km^{2})
  - Water: 2.84 sq mi (7.35 km^{2})
- Elevation: 906 ft (276 m)

Population (2020)
  - Total: 4,159
  - Density: 93/sq mi (35.8/km^{2})
- Time zone: UTC-6 (Central (CST))
  - Summer (DST): UTC-5 (CDT)
- ZIP code: 55025
- Area code: 651
- FIPS code: 27-12718
- GNIS feature ID: 2393610
- Website: https://columbusmn.gov/

Columbus is a city in Anoka County, Minnesota, United States. The population was 4,159 at the 2020 census.

== History ==
The city was known as Columbus Township until September 21, 2006, when it was incorporated as the city of Columbus, in response to concerns that the adjacent city of Forest Lake was planning to annex portions of the township.

Mel Mettler, the first mayor of Columbus, was reelected in 2008. Ron Hanegraaf was elected mayor in 2024.

Running Aces Harness Park, a 5/8 mile harness horse racing track, opened in Columbus in April 2008.

== Geography ==
According to the United States Census Bureau, the city has an area of 47.76 square miles (123.70 km^{2}), of which 44.92 square miles (116.34 km^{2}) is land and 2.84 square miles (7.36 km^{2}) is water.

Anoka County Roads 18, 19, 23, 54, and 62 are the main routes in the community. Interstate 35 splits into Interstates 35E and 35W within the southeast corner of Columbus. The junction is commonly known as the Forest Lake Split, after the city to the immediate east.

Rice Creek flows through Columbus. Carlos Avery Wildlife Area is in the north-central and west-central parts of the city.

Nearby places include Forest Lake, Lino Lakes, Ham Lake, East Bethel, and Wyoming.

== Demographics ==
Historical population
Census	Pop.	Note	%±
1860	119		—
1870	71		−40.3%
1880	92		29.6%
1890	262		184.8%
1900	484		84.7%
1910	585		20.9%
1920	569		−2.7%
1930	597		4.9%
1940	658		10.2%
1950	748		13.7%
1960	908		21.4%
1970	1,999		120.2%
1980	3,232		61.7%
1990	3,690		14.2%
2000	3,957		7.2%
2010	3,914		−1.1%
2020	4,159		6.3%
U.S. Decennial Census

=== 2020 census ===
As of the 2020 census, Columbus had a population of 4,159. The median age was 46.6 years. 19.6% of residents were under the age of 18 and 19.8% of residents were 65 years of age or older. For every 100 females there were 105.2 males, and for every 100 females age 18 and over there were 105.4 males age 18 and over.

3.7% of residents lived in urban areas, while 96.3% lived in rural areas.

There were 1,553 households in Columbus, of which 27.1% had children under the age of 18 living in them. Of all households, 66.5% were married-couple households, 14.3% were households with a male householder and no spouse or partner present, and 12.6% were households with a female householder and no spouse or partner present. About 17.0% of all households were made up of individuals and 8.3% had someone living alone who was 65 years of age or older.

There were 1,594 housing units, of which 2.6% were vacant. The homeowner vacancy rate was 0.7% and the rental vacancy rate was 1.9%.

Racial composition as of the 2020 census
Race	Number	Percent
White	3,703	89.0%
Black or African American	20	0.5%
American Indian and Alaska Native	29	0.7%
Asian	220	5.3%
Native Hawaiian and Other Pacific Islander	0	0.0%
Some other race	21	0.5%
Two or more races	166	4.0%
Hispanic or Latino (of any race)	49	1.2%

=== 2010 census ===
As of the census of 2010, there were 3,914 people, 1,416 households, and 1,119 families residing in the city. The population density was 87.1 inhabitants per square mile (33.6/km^{2}). There were 1,464 housing units at an average density of 32.6 per square mile (12.6/km^{2}). The racial makeup of the city was 93.6% White, 0.7% African American, 0.6% Native American, 3.6% Asian, 0.1% Pacific Islander, 0.2% from other races, and 1.2% from two or more races. Hispanic or Latino of any race were 1.6% of the population.

There were 1,416 households, of which 31.3% had children under the age of 18 living with them, 69.1% were married couples living together, 5.2% had a female householder with no husband present, 4.8% had a male householder with no wife present, and 21.0% were non-families. 15.5% of all households were made up of individuals, and 5.9% had someone living alone who was 65 years of age or older. The average household size was 2.76 and the average family size was 3.08.

The median age in the city was 45.3 years. 22.3% of residents were under the age of 18; 7.5% were between the ages of 18 and 24; 19.5% were from 25 to 44; 39.6% were from 45 to 64; and 11.2% were 65 years of age or older. The gender makeup of the city was 51.9% male and 48.1% female.

=== 2000 census ===
As of the census of 2000, there were 3,957 people, 1,328 households, and 1,120 families residing in the township. The population density was 88.2 inhabitants per square mile (34.1/km^{2}). There were 1,358 housing units at an average density of 30.3 per square mile (11.7/km^{2}). The racial makeup of the township was 97.60% White, 0.18% African American, 0.56% Native American, 0.56% Asian, 0.08% from other races, and 1.04% from two or more races. Hispanic or Latino of any race were 0.58% of the population.

There were 1,328 households, out of which 39.3% had children under the age of 18 living with them, 74.9% were married couples living together, 5.3% had a female householder with no husband present, and 15.6% were non-families. 11.1% of all households were made up of individuals, and 2.8% had someone living alone who was 65 years of age or older. The average household size was 2.97 and the average family size was 3.22.

In the township the population was spread out, with 27.8% under the age of 18, 7.5% from 18 to 24, 29.5% from 25 to 44, 28.9% from 45 to 64, and 6.2% who were 65 years of age or older. The median age 38. For every 100 females, there were 106.5 males. For every 100 females age 18 and over, there were 106.2 males.

The median income for a household in the township was $67,500, and the median income for a family was $71,809. Males had a median income of $42,948 versus $31,417 for females. The per capita income for the township was $24,479. About 2.2% of families and 3.8% of the population were below the poverty line, including 3.2% of those under age 18 and 2.8% of those age 65 or over.
