= U.S. Route 65 in Minnesota =

Segment of American highway

U.S. Highway 65
- US 65 highlighted in red

Route information
- Maintained by MnDOT
- Length: 15.465 mi (24.889 km)
- Existed: November 11, 1926–present

Major junctions
- South end: US 65 at the Iowa state line in Gordonsville
- I-35 in Albert Lea; MN 13 in Albert Lea
- North end: I-35 in Albert Lea

Location
- Country: United States
- State: Minnesota
- Counties: Freeborn

Highway system
- United States Numbered Highway System; List; Special; Divided; Minnesota Trunk Highway System; Interstate; US; State; Legislative; Scenic
← MN 64	→ MN 65

U.S. Highway 65 (US 65) is a north–south United States Numbered Highway running from Clayton, Louisiana to Albert Lea, Minnesota. In the state of Minnesota, US 65 travels for 15 miles from the Iowa border to a partial interchange with Interstate 35 in Albert Lea. The length of US 65 in Minnesota is the shortest of the five states the route travels through.

Historically, US 65 was a prominent route in southern Minnesota. From 1926 to 1935, the route reached Saint Paul. It was then realigned to end in Minneapolis, where the endpoint remained until the route was truncated to Albert Lea in 1980.

== Route description ==
US 65 enters Minnesota just south of the community of Gordonsville. Parallel to a Union Pacific rail line through farmland, the route travels northwest and passes east of Gordonsville and west of downtown Glenville towards its first interchange with I-35. At the interchange, the road enters the city of Albert Lea, expands to a four-lane divided highway and a business loop of I-35 begins, a route co-signed along US 65. The route curves to a true north–south direction north of 7th street in Albert Lea and narrows to a two-lane urban street known as Broadway Avenue. At a junction with MN 13, the route turns onto a four-lane divided highway known as Main Street and begins traveling east towards I-35. Near the end of the route, it splits from Main Street at a partial interchange with CSAH 46, which continues east and provides access to southbound I-35 via a diamond interchange. US 65 then travels northeast and merges onto northbound I-35 at a partial interchange, where it and business loop 35 end.

The entirety of US 65 in Minnesota is defined as part of Route 1 in Minnesota Statutes § 161.114(2). The route was marked with this number until 1934.

== History ==
US 65 was an original US Highway commissioned in 1926. The original routing corresponded to Minnesota's southernmost portion of the Jefferson Highway and Legislative Route 1 from the Iowa state line to Saint Paul. In 1935, this routing was changed to follow US 55's former route from Farmington to Minneapolis. The official 1934 State Highway map showed US 65 extending further north of Minneapolis along MN 65 to McGregor, but this routing was never approved by the American Association of State Highway and Transportation Officials, and this portion of the route was taken over by MN 65.

A portion of US 65 was re-routed to follow the first completed section of I-35 in 1958. As sections of I-35 and I-35W were completed in the 1960s and 1970s, more of the route shifted to follow the freeways. After the freeways were completed, US 65 was truncated to its current endpoint in Albert Lea in 1980.

=== Jefferson Highway ===
Jefferson Highway
- Location: Gordonsville to Noyes
- Existed: 1917–1931

The original route of US 65 from the Iowa state line to Saint Paul had previously been established as a portion of the Jefferson Highway, an auto trail which ran from New Orleans to Winnipeg. The Minnesota section of the highway was authorized by the Minnesota Highway Department on September 7, 1917, and followed Legislative Route 1 from the Iowa state line to Saint Paul, before traveling northwest through the cities of Minneapolis, Anoka, Elk River, St. Cloud, Little Falls, Staples, Wadena, Park Rapids, Bemidji, Red Lake Falls, Thief River Falls, Lake Bronson, Hallock, and St. Vincent. The route continued north from the Noyes–Emerson East Border Crossing to end in Winnipeg.

=== Highway 165 ===
Trunk Highway 165
- Location: Faribault to Lakeville
- Existed: 1935–1957

When US 65 was rerouted to end in Minneapolis in 1935, the Minnesota Legislature authorized Trunk Highway 165, which provided a direct connection from Faribault to Lakeville, bypassing the cities of Dundas, Northfield, and Farmington. Initially unpaved, the route was completely paved in 1950. In 1957, US 65 was re-routed onto the highway, and highway 165 was subsequently decommissioned.

Browse numbered routes
← MN 156	MN 165	→ US 169

== Major intersections ==
Mileage for the highway begins at 300. The entire highway is in Freeborn County.

Location	mi	km	Destinations	Notes
Shell Rock Township	300.000	482.803	US 65 south / Jefferson Highway Heritage Byway	Continuation into Iowa
Albert Lea	309.288– 309.638	497.751– 498.314	I-35 / I-35 BL begins	Exit 8 on I-35; southern terminus of BL 35
Albert Lea	312.505	502.928	MN 13 (Main Street)	Formerly US 16
Albert Lea	314.480– 314.493	506.107– 506.127	CSAH 46 to I-35 south	Northbound exit, southbound entrance; formerly US 16
Albert Lea	315.465	507.692	I-35 north / I-35 BL ends	National northern terminus of US 65; northern terminus of BL 35; southbound entrance, northbound exit from I-35
1.000 mi = 1.609 km; 1.000 km = 0.621 mi: Concurrency terminus; Incomplete access

== See also ==
- Minnesota State Highway 218
- Minnesota State Highway 3

U.S. Route 65
Previous state: Iowa	Minnesota	Next state: Terminus
