= Finlayson Township, Pine County, Minnesota =

Finlayson Township, Minnesota
- Township
- Location within the state of Minnesota Finlayson Township, Minnesota (the United States)
- Coordinates: 46°12′17″N 92°52′18″W
- Country: United States
- State: Minnesota
- County: Pine

Area
  - Total: 34.1 sq mi (88.2 km^{2})
  - Land: 33.7 sq mi (87.4 km^{2})
  - Water: 0.31 sq mi (0.8 km^{2})
- Elevation: 1,096 ft (334 m)

Population (2000)
  - Total: 506
  - Density: 15/sq mi (5.8/km^{2})
- Time zone: UTC-6 (Central (CST))
  - Summer (DST): UTC-5 (CDT)
- ZIP code: 55735
- Area code: 320
- FIPS code: 27-21140
- GNIS feature ID: 0664169

Finlayson Township is a township in Pine County, Minnesota, United States. The population was 506 at the 2000 census. The township's original extent was reduced when the city of Finlayson was incorporated and separated from it.

Finlayson Township was named for David Finlayson, the owner of a local sawmill.

Interstate 35 and Minnesota State Highways 18 and 23 are three of the main routes in the area.

== Geography ==
According to the United States Census Bureau, the township has a total area of 34.1 square miles (88 km^{2}), of which 33.7 square miles (87 km^{2}) is land and 0.3 square miles (0.78 km^{2}) (0.94%) is water.

== Demographics ==
As of the census of 2000, there were 506 people, 196 households, and 141 families residing in the township. The population density was 15.0 inhabitants per square mile (5.8/km^{2}). There were 244 housing units at an average density of 7.2 per square mile (2.8/km^{2}). The racial makeup of the township was 96.84% White, 1.98% Native American, 0.40% Asian, and 0.79% from two or more races. Hispanic or Latino of any race were 0.99% of the population.

There were 196 households, out of which 30.6% had children under the age of 18 living with them, 60.7% were married couples living together, 7.1% had a female householder with no husband present, and 27.6% were non-families. 21.4% of all households were made up of individuals, and 5.1% had someone living alone who was 65 years of age or older. The average household size was 2.58 and the average family size was 3.01.

In the township the population was spread out, with 26.9% under the age of 18, 7.9% from 18 to 24, 27.5% from 25 to 44, 27.3% from 45 to 64, and 10.5% who were 65 years of age or older. The median age was 38 years. For every 100 females, there were 104.9 males. For every 100 females age 18 and over, there were 109.0 males.

The median income for a household in the township was $30,357, and the median income for a family was $34,167. Males had a median income of $22,159 versus $20,938 for females. The per capita income for the township was $15,070. About 10.6% of families and 12.4% of the population were below the poverty line, including 14.4% of those under age 18 and 8.6% of those age 65 or over.
