= List of Interstate Highways in Minnesota =

Interstate Highways of the Trunk Highway System
- Highway markers for I-90, I-494 and I-35 Bus.

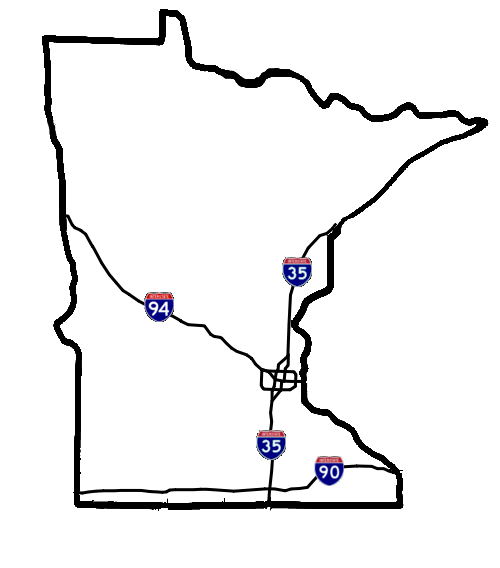
- Minnesota Interstates

System information
- Length: 921.621 mi (1,483.205 km)
- Formed: August 14, 1957

Highway names
- Interstates: Interstate X (I-X)
- Business Loops and Spurs: Interstate X Business (I-X Bus.)

System links
- Minnesota Trunk Highway System; Interstate; US; State; Legislative; Scenic

The Interstate Highways in Minnesota are all owned and operated by the US State of Minnesota. The Minnesota Department of Transportation (MnDOT) provides primary maintenance for all 921.621 miles of highway. There are no tolled miles on the Minnesota Interstate, with the exception of HOV lanes governed by the E-ZPass program. The system is made up of three primary routes, four auxiliary sections, including two spurs and two loop sections, as well as one of three split sections remaining in the United States, I-35E and I-35W.

== Primary Interstate Highways ==
Number	Length (mi)	Length (km)	Southern or western terminus	Northern or eastern terminus	Formed	Removed	Notes
I-35	220.299	354.537	I-35 / Iowa 27 towards Mason City, Iowa I-35E / I-35W in Columbus	I-35E / I-35W in Burnsville MN 61 in Duluth	1958	current	
I-35E	39.340	63.312	I-35 in Burnsville	I-35 in Columbus	1970	current	Serves St. Paul
I-35W	41.778	67.235	I-35 in Burnsville	I-35 in Columbus	—	—	Serves Minneapolis
I-90	275.701	443.698	I-90 towards Sioux Falls, S.D.	I-90 towards La Crosse, Wis.	1961	current	
I-94	259.566	417.731	I-94 / US 52 in Fargo, N.D.	I-94 / US 12 in Hudson, Wis.	—	—	

== Auxiliary Interstate Highways ==
Number	Length (mi)	Length (km)	Southern or western terminus	Northern or eastern terminus	Formed	Removed	Notes
I-335	2.74	4.41	I-94 in Minneapolis	I-35W in Minneapolis	1964	1979	Cancelled
I-394	9.735	15.667	I-494 in Minnetonka	Minneapolis	1991	current	
I-494	42.856	68.970	I-94 / I-694 in Maple Grove	I-94 / I-694 in Woodbury	1985	current	
I-535	1.571	2.528	I-535 / US 53 in Superior, Wis.	I-35 / US 53 in Duluth	1971	current	
I-694	30.767	49.515	I-94 / I-694 in Maple Grove	I-94 / I-694 in Woodbury	1970	current	
Former

== Business Interstate Highways ==
Number	Length (mi)	Length (km)	Southern or western terminus	Northern or eastern terminus	Formed	Removed	Notes
I-35 BL	6.5	10.5	I-35 / US 65 in Albert Lea	I-35 / US 65 in Albert Lea	—	—	Northern terminus of US 65
I-35 BL	3.3	5.3	I-35 / CSAH 48 in Faribault	I-35 / MN 21 in Faribault	2006	current	
I-35 BL	2.8	4.5	I-35 / CSAH 7 in Pine City	I-35 / CSAH 11 in Pine City	2013	current	
I-90 BL	3.2	5.1	I-90 / CSAH 25 in Worthington	I-90 / MN 60 in Worthington	—	—	
I-90 BL	6.1	9.8	I-90 / CSAH 39 in Fairmont	I-90 / MN 15 in Fairmont	—	—	
I-90 BL	4.2	6.8	I-90 / CSAH 45 in Austin	I-90 / MN 105 in Austin	—	—	
I-94 BL	12.6	20.3	I-94 / US 52 in Fargo, ND	I-94 / CSAH 52 Moorhead	—	—	
