= List of U.S. Highways in Minnesota =

United States Numbered Highways of the Trunk Highway System
- Highway markers from different years for former US Highway 10N (1926), former US 210 (1961) and current US Highway 61 (1971)
- U.S. Highways in Minnesota highlighted in red

System information
- Formed: November 11, 1926

Highway names
- US Highways: US Highway nn (US nn)

System links
- Minnesota Trunk Highway System; Interstate; US; State; Legislative; Scenic

== Mainline highways ==
| Number | Length (mi) | Length (km) | Southern or western terminus | Northern or eastern terminus | Formed | Removed | Notes |
|---|---|---|---|---|---|---|---|
| US 2 | 264.070 | 424.979 | US 2 in Grand Forks, ND | US 2 in Superior, WI | 1926 | current | |
| US 8 | 22.129 | 35.613 | I-35 in Forest Lake | US 8 in St. Croix Falls, WI | 1926 | current | |
| US 10 | 275.408 | 443.226 | US 10 in Fargo, ND | US 10 in Prescott, WI | 1926 | current | |
| US 10N | — | — | US 10 in Moorhead | US 10 in St. Cloud | 1926 | 1934 | Became US 10 |
| US 10S | — | — | US 10 in Moorhead | US 10 in St. Cloud | 1926 | 1934 | Became US 52 |
| US 12 | 192.997 | 310.599 | US 12 in Big Stone City, SD | I-94/US 12 in Hudson, WI | 1926 | current | |
| US 14 | 288.319 | 464.004 | US 14 towards Brookings, SD | US 14/US 61/WIS 16 in La Crosse, WI | 1926 | current | |
| US 16 | 286 | 460 | US 16 towards Sioux Falls, SD | US 61/US 14/US 16 towards La Crosse, WI | 1926 | c. 1980 | |
| US 52 | 374.703 | 603.026 | US 52 towards Decorah, IA | I-94/US 52 in Fargo, ND | 1934 | current | Unsigned from I-94 to North Dakota |
| US 53 | 164.399 | 264.575 | I-535/US 53 in Superior, WI | Hwy 71 in Fort Frances, ON | 1934 | current | |
| US 55 | 145 | 233 | US 55 towards Decorah, IA | US 12 in Minneapolis | 1926 | 1934 | Became US 52 |
| US 59 | 426.766 | 686.813 | US 59 towards Sanborn, IA | PTH-59 towards Winnipeg, MB | c. 1930 | current | |
| US 61 | 165.213 | 265.885 | US 14/US 61/WIS 16 in La Crosse, WI | I-35 in Wyoming | 1926 | current | Used to run to the Canadian Border at Grand Portage along present-day I-35 and MN 61 |
| US 63 | 91.881 | 147.868 | US 63 towards New Hampton, IA | US 63 towards Ellsworth, WI | c. 1930 | current | |
| US 65 | 15.465 | 24.889 | US 65 towards Northwood, IA | I-35 in Albert Lea | 1926 | current | |
| US 69 | 12.495 | 20.109 | US 69 towards Lake Mills, IA | MN 13 in Albert Lea | c. 1930 | current | |
| US 71 | 425.778 | 685.223 | US 71 towards Spirit Lake, IA | Hwy. 71 in Fort Frances, ON | 1926 | current | |
| US 75 | 412.300 | 663.533 | US 75 towards Rock Rapids, IA | Dead end at Noyes, MN | 1926 | current | Continued northerly on PTH-75 at Emerson, MB until the Noyes–Emerson East Border Crossing was closed in 2006 |
| US 77 | 1.350 | 2.173 | US 12/US 77 towards Milbank, SD | US 75 in Ortonville | c. 1930 | c. 1960 | |
| US 169 | 359.626 | 578.762 | US 169 towards Lakota, IA | US 53 in Virginia | c. 1930 | current | |
| US 210 | 117.851 | 189.663 | US 10 in Motley | US 61 in Carlton | 1926 | 1970 | |
| US 212 | 162.177 | 260.999 | US 212 towards Watertown, SD | US 169/MN 62 in Edina | 1926 | current | |
| US 218 | 46.739 | 75.219 | US 218 towards Osage, IA | I-35/US 14 southwest of Owatonna | 1926 | current | |
| US 371 | 131 | 211 | US 10 in Little Falls | US 71 in Bemidji | c. 1930 | 1973 | |
Former

== Special routes ==
| Number | Length (mi) | Length (km) | Southern or western terminus | Northern or eastern terminus | Formed | Removed | Notes |
|---|---|---|---|---|---|---|---|
| US 2 Bus. | 2.818 | 4.535 | US 2 Bus. in Grand Forks, ND | US 2 in East Grand Forks | c. 1960 | current | |
| US 14 Bus. | 5.83 | 9.38 | — | — | — | — | Serves Dodge Center |
| US 53 Bus. | 3.72 | 5.99 | — | — | — | — | Serves Virginia |
| US 71 Bus. | 4.65 | 7.48 | — | — | — | — | Serves Willmar |
| US 71 Byp. | 5.96 | 9.59 | — | — | — | — | Serves Willmar |
| US 169 Bus. | 2.87 | 4.62 | — | — | — | — | Serves Hibbing |
| US 169 Bus. | 2.39 | 3.85 | — | — | — | — | Serves Chisholm |
