= List of Minnesota state highways serving state institutions =

Minnesota Trunk Highways serving state institutions

Highway names
- Interstates: Interstate X (I-X)
- US Highways: U.S. Highway X (US X)
- State: Trunk Highway X (MN X or TH X)

System links
- Minnesota Trunk Highway System; Interstate; US; State; Legislative; Scenic

In 1951, the state of Minnesota commissioned a number of short state highways to serve state institutions such as hospitals and penitentiaries.

== List of highways ==
Number	Length (mi)	Length (km)	Southern or western terminus	Northern or eastern terminus	Formed	Removed
MN 288	—	—	US 10 in Anoka	Anoka State Hospital	1951	1998
MN 289	0.512	0.824	MN 73 at Moose Lake	Minnesota Correctional Facility at Moose Lake	1951	current
MN 290	0.400	0.644	Ah-gwah-ching State Health Care Facility	MN 200/MN 371 near Walker	1951	2009
MN 291	1.318	2.121	US 61 in Hastings	Ravenna Trail (CSAH 54) in Hastings	1951	c. 2014
MN 292	0.807	1.299	US 61/US 63 at Red Wing	US 61/US 63 at Red Wing	1951	current
MN 293	1.683	2.709	MN 65 in Cambridge	MN 95 in Cambridge	1951	2009
MN 294	1.6	2.6	US 71 Bus. in Willmar	—	1951	2006
MN 295	1.160	1.867	Minnesota Security Hospital in St. Peter	US 169 in St. Peter	1951	c. 2010
MN 296	—	—	US 63 in Rochester	Rochester State Hospital	1951	1990
MN 297	0.475	0.764	Fir Avenue in Fergus Falls	Fir Avenue in Fergus Falls	1951	2010
MN 298	1.092	1.757	Minnesota Correctional Facility at Faribault	MN 60/MN 299 in Faribault	1951	2026
MN 299	0.674	1.085	MN 60/MN 298 in Faribault	Minnesota State Academy for the Deaf	1951	2026
MN 300	—	—	US 169 at Shakopee	Minnesota Correctional Facility in Shakopee	1951	1996
MN 301	1.059	1.704	CSAH 8 in St. Cloud	US 10 at St. Cloud	1951	current
MN 302	—	—	US 71 at Sauk Centre	State Home for Girls at Sauk Centre	1951	2003
MN 303	—	—	US 14 in Owatonna	US 14 in Owatonna	1951	1973
MN 309	0.274	0.441	MN 18 at Brainerd	MN 18 at Brainerd	c. 1959	2014
MN 323	0.20	0.32	MN 298 at Faribault	MN 298 at Faribault	1970	c. 2010
MN 329	1.112	1.790	MN 329 in Morris	West Central Research and Outreach Center at Morris	c. 1970	current
MN 330	2.020	3.251	US 14 in Lamberton Township	US 14 near Lamberton	c. 1975	current
MN 333	0.492	0.792	Minnesota Security Hospital in St. Peter	MN 99 in St. Peter	c. 1983	2010
Former

== State Highway 288 ==
Trunk Highway 288
- Location: Anoka State Hospital
- Existed: 1951–1998

State Highway 288 (MN 288) was a highway which ran from U.S. Highway 10 (US 10) to the Anoka State Hospital in the city of Anoka.

The route was authorized in 1951 and removed in 1998. Part of the route is now Anoka County Road 7; the rest is a city street.

== State Highway 289 ==
Trunk Highway 289
- Location: Minnesota Correctional Facility at Moose Lake
- Length: 0.512 mi (824 m)
- Existed: 1951–present

State Highway 289 (MN 289) is a short highway in northeast Minnesota, which runs from its intersection with MN 73 on the south side of Moose Lake and continues eastbound for 0.5 miles (0.80 km) past the Minnesota Correctional Facility at Moose Lake, formerly known as the Moose Lake Treatment Center. The roadway is located in Carlton County. Interstate 35 is nearby.

The route was authorized in 1951. MN 289 has been rerouted from its original routing to a more direct route farther south.

== State Highway 290 ==
Trunk Highway 290
- Location: Ah-gwah-ching State Health Care Facility
- Length: 0.4 mi (640 m)
- Existed: 1951–2009

State Highway 290 (MN 290) was a short highway in north–central Minnesota, which ran from the State Health Care Facility and continued north to its northern terminus at its intersection with MN 200/MN 371 two miles (3.2 km) south of Walker in Cass County on the west side of Walker Bay of Leech Lake.

The roadway was an unmarked state route from 1951 to 2009. The route was, and still is, also known as Ah-gwah-ching Road NW. MN 290 was 0.4 miles (0.64 km) in length. The roadway was removed from the state highway system by the 2009 Legislature.

== State Highway 291 ==
Trunk Highway 291
- Location: Hastings Veterans Home
- Length: 1.318 mi (2.121 km)
- Existed: 1951–c. 2014

State Highway 291 (MN 291) was a short highway in southeast Minnesota, which ran from its intersection with U.S. Highway 61 (USS 61) in Hastings and continued eastbound for 1.3 miles (2.1 km) past the Hastings Veterans Home to its eastern terminus at its intersection with Dakota County Road 54 (Ravenna Trail) in Hastings. The roadway is located in Dakota County.

MN 291 is also known as East 18th Street and Le Duc Drive in Hastings. The roadway crosses the Vermillion River.

The route was authorized in 1951. MN 291 originally ran off 10th Street and into the Veterans Home from the north rather than from the west at 18th Street as it did until cancellation. The roadway was removed from the state highway system by the 2012 Legislature.

== State Highway 292 ==
Trunk Highway 292
- Location: Minnesota Correctional Facility in Red Wing
- Length: 1.3 mi (2.1 km)
- Existed: 1951–present

State Highway 292 (MN 292) is a short highway in southeast Minnesota, which runs from its first intersection with U.S. Highway 61 (US 61) and US 63 at the Minnesota Correctional Facility in Red Wing and continues for 1.3 miles (2.1 km) past the facility to its terminus at its second intersection with US 61/US 63 in Red Wing. The roadway is located in Goodhue County.

The route was authorized in 1951. MN 292 will eventually be given to the city of Hastings.

== State Highway 293 ==
Trunk Highway 293
- Location: Cambridge State Hospital
- Length: 1.7 mi (2.7 km)
- Existed: 1951–2009

State Highway 293 (MN 293) was a short highway in east central Minnesota, which ran from its intersection with old MN 65 (Main Street) in Cambridge and continued west and then north to its northern terminus at its intersection with State MN 95 (1st Avenue) in Cambridge. The route was located in Isanti County.

The roadway was a state marked route from 1951 to 2009. The route had followed 18th Avenue SW and Dellwood Street in Cambridge. MN 293 had linked MN 95 and the former route of MN 65.

MN 293 was 1.7 miles (2.7 km) in length and had served the now-closed Cambridge State Hospital. The roadway was removed from the state highway system by the 2009 Legislature, several years after the closure of the Cambridge State Hospital.

== State Highway 294 ==
Trunk Highway 294
- Location: Willmar Regional Treatment Center
- Length: 1.6 mi (2.6 km)
- Existed: 1951–2006

State Highway 294 (MN 294) was a short highway in west–central Minnesota, which ran from its first intersection with Business MN 71 in Willmar and continued briefly east and then north to its northern terminus at its second intersection with Business MN 71 in Willmar near the U.S. Highway 71 (US 71) and MN 23 interchange on the north side of Willmar. The route was located in Kandiyohi County.

The roadway was a state route from 1951 to 2006. The route had followed Technology Drive NE in Willmar and then briefly followed Civic Center Drive. MN 294 was 1.6 miles (2.6 km) in length and had serviced the Willmar Regional Treatment Center.

MN 294 was removed from the state highway system by the 2006 Legislature. The roadway had always been marked from Business 71 at the interchange off-ramps with US 71/MN 23 on the north side of Willmar. The off-ramps as far as the first intersection at County Road 24 (26th Avenue) are officially designated unsigned Route 994A.

== State Highway 295 ==
Trunk Highway 295
- Location: St. Peter Regional Treatment Center
- Length: 1.1 mi (1.8 km)
- Existed: 1951–c. 2010

State Highway 295 (MN 295) was a short highway in south–central Minnesota, which runs from the St. Peter Regional Treatment Center in St. Peter; and continues for 1.1 miles (1.8 km) past the facility to its eastern terminus at its intersection with U.S. Highway 169 in St. Peter. The roadway is located in Nicollet County.

The route was authorized in 1951. MN 295 was removed by the 2008 Legislature, but was still listed in the trunk highway log as of 2009 and not eliminated until 2010. Part of the roadway was obliterated.

== State Highway 296 ==
Trunk Highway 296
- Location: Rochester State Hospital
- Existed: 1951–1990

State Highway 296 (MN 296) was a highway about two miles in length which ran from U.S. Highway 63 in Rochester to the Rochester State Hospital.

The route was authorized in 1951 and removed from the highway system in 1990, when the state hospital closed. The route is now a city street, Fourth Street, SE. The campus was later converted to the Federal Medical Center, Rochester.

== State Highway 297 ==
Trunk Highway 297
- Location: Fergus Falls Regional Treatment Center
- Length: 0.5 mi (800 m)
- Existed: 1951–2010

State Highway 297 (MN 297) was a short highway in west–central Minnesota, which ran from its first intersection with West Fir Avenue in Fergus Falls and continued for 0.5 miles (0.80 km) past the Fergus Falls Regional Treatment Center facility to its eastern terminus at its second intersection with West Fir Avenue in Fergus Falls. The roadway was located in Otter Tail County. The route was authorized in 1951. The route was removed from the state highway system in 2010.

The short route of MN 297 did not intersect any other state trunk highway; however it formerly intersected U.S. Highway 59 before that highway was re-routed to the south of Fergus Falls.

== State Highway 298 ==
Trunk Highway 298
- Location: Minnesota Correctional Facility in Faribault
- Length: 1.092 mi (1.757 km)
- Existed: 1951–2026

State Highway 298 (MN 298) was a short highway in southeast Minnesota, which ran from two state facilities in Faribault and continued for 1.1 miles (1.8 km) past the facilities to its northern terminus at its intersection with MN 60 and MN 299 in Faribault. MN 298 served the Minnesota State Academy for the Blind and the Minnesota Correctional Facility at Faribault. The route followed 6th Avenue SE. The roadway was located in Rice County.

At its northern terminus intersection, MN 298 adjoined MN 299, which served the Minnesota State Academy for the Deaf facility.

The route was authorized in 1951. The additional loop of MN 298 was authorized c. 1970. This added loop, into the Minnesota State Academy for the Blind, was authorized under legislative route 323; and in 2009 was given that number as its trunk highway designation, as a separate route. The southern terminus of Highway 298, which used to loop around and return north to join itself, was terminated in 2009 at the entrance of the Minnesota Correctional Facility — Faribault. As of 2026, MN 298 has been removed and given to the city of Faribault.

== State Highway 299 ==
Trunk Highway 299
- Location: State Academy for the Deaf
- Length: 0.674 mi (1,085 m)
- Existed: 1951–2026

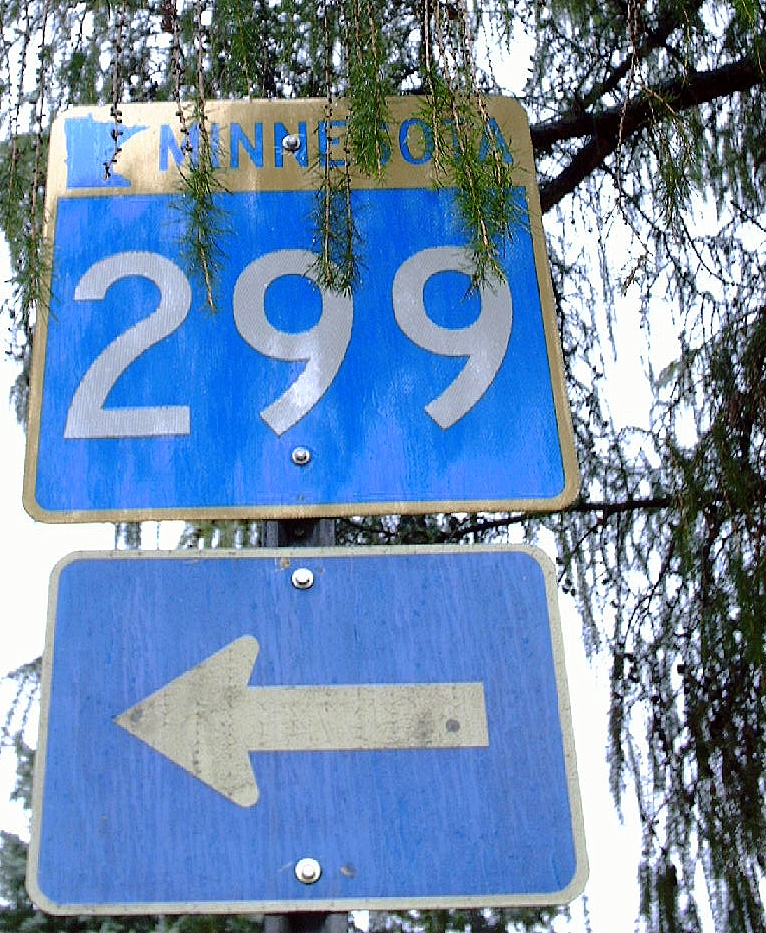
Minnesota State Highway 299.

State Highway 299 (MN 299) was a short highway in southeast Minnesota, which ran from its intersection with MN 60 and MN 298 in Faribault and continued for 0.7 miles (1.1 km) to its northern terminus at the Minnesota State Academy for the Deaf facility in Faribault. MN 299 followed 6th Avenue NE and Olof Hansen Drive. Like most other special Minnesota state highways serving state facilities, it ended in a circle. The roadway was located in Rice County.

At its southern terminus intersection, MN 299 adjoined MN 298, which served the nearby Minnesota State Academy for the Blind and the Minnesota Correctional Facility at Faribault. MN 299 intersected MN 60 at the same intersection as MN 298.

The route was authorized in 1951. As of 2026, MN 299 signs have been removed and the road has been given back to the city of Faribault.

== State Highway 300 ==
Trunk Highway 300
- Location: Women's Correctional Facility in Shakopee
- Existed: 1951–1996

State Highway 300 (MN 300) was a highway which ran from former U.S. Highway 169 (now CSAH 69) in Shakopee to the Women's Correctional Facility. The route was authorized in 1951 and removed in 1996. It is now an extension of Scott County Road 16.

== State Highway 301 ==
Trunk Highway 301
- Location: Minnesota Correctional Facility in St. Cloud
- Length: 1.059 mi (1.704 km)
- Existed: 1951–present

State Highway 301 (MN 301) is a short highway in Minnesota, which runs from its intersection with Sherburne County Road 8 (15th Avenue SE) in St. Cloud and continues for one mile to its eastern terminus at its intersection with U.S. Highway 10 in St. Cloud. MN 301 serves the Minnesota Correctional Facility at St. Cloud. The route follows Minnesota Boulevard SE. The roadway is located in the Sherburne County portion of St. Cloud.

The route was authorized in 1951. The route is facing a turnback to the city of St. Cloud, as the legislative route is being removed.

== State Highway 302 ==
Trunk Highway 302
- Location: State Home for Girls in Sauk Centre
- Existed: 1951–2003

State Highway 302 (MN 302) was a highway which ran from U.S. Highway 71 east to the State Home for Girls in Sauk Centre. It was authorized in 1951 and decommissioned in 2003. The property has since been redeveloped, and the roadway itself has been removed.

== State Highway 303 ==
Trunk Highway 303
- Location: State School in Owatonna
- Existed: 1951–1973

State Highway 303 (MN 303) was a highway which ran from U.S. Highway 14 (US 14_, through a state school in the northwest part of the city of Owatonna, and then returned to US 14. The route was authorized in 1951 and removed in 1973.

== State Highway 309 ==
Trunk Highway 309
- Location: Brainerd State Hospital
- Length: 0.274 mi (441 m)
- Existed: c. 1959–2014

State Highway 309 (MN 309) was a short highway in north–central Minnesota, which ran from its first intersection with MN 18 in Brainerd and continued for 0.3 miles (0.48 km) to its eastern terminus at its second intersection with MN 18 in Brainerd. The roadway was located in Crow Wing County.

MN 309 served the Brainerd State Hospital, also known as the Brainerd Regional Human Services Center. The roadway forms a U-shape with two junctions on MN 18. The western terminus of MN 18 in Brainerd is nearby at its intersection with MN 25.

The route was authorized c. 1959.

== State Highway 323 ==
Trunk Highway 323
- Location: State Academy for the Blind in Faribault
- Length: 0.2 mi (320 m)
- Existed: 1970–c. 2010

State Highway 323 (MN 323) was a highway which formed a loop off of MN 298 to serve the State Academy for the Blind in Faribault. It was authorized in 1970 as Legislative Route 323 but was treated as an extension of MN 298 until 2009. As of 2026, MN 323 has been removed and given to the city of Faribault.

== State Highway 329 ==
Trunk Highway 329
- Location: West Central Research and Outreach Center in Morris
- Length: 1.112 mi (1.790 km)
- Existed: c. 1970–present

State Highway 329 (MN 329) is a short highway in west–central Minnesota, which runs from its intersection with U.S. Highway 59 (US 59) in the city of Morris, and continues eastbound for 1.1 miles (1.8 km) to its eastern terminus in Framnas Township at the West Central Research and Outreach Center. The roadway is located in Stevens County.

MN 329 serves the University of Minnesota - West Central Research and Outreach Center at Morris, a division of the greater University of Minnesota's College of Food, Agricultural and Natural Resource Sciences. The Morris facility researches crop production, animal sciences, horticulture, water quality, organic dairy, and renewable energy. The route was authorized c. 1970.

MN 329 crosses the Pomme de Terre River.

The University of Minnesota at Morris campus is located immediately west of the junction of US 59, MN 329, and Prairie Lane.

== State Highway 330 ==
Trunk Highway 330
- Location: University of Minnesota - Southwest Research and Outreach Center
- Length: 2.020 mi (3.251 km)
- Existed: c. 1975–present

State Highway 330 (MN 330) is a short highway in southwest Minnesota, which runs from its first intersection with U.S. Highway 14 (US 14) in Lamberton Township, and continues for two miles (3.2 km) to its eastern terminus at its second intersection with US 14 near the city of Lamberton. The roadway is located in Redwood County.

MN 330 serves the University of Minnesota - Southwest Research and Outreach Center at Lamberton, an agricultural research and education station. The roadway forms a U-shape with two junctions on US 14.

The route was authorized c. 1975.

== State Highway 333 ==
Trunk Highway 333
- Location: St. Peter State Hospital
- Length: 0.492 mi (792 m)
- Existed: ca. 1983–c. 2010

State Highway 333 (MN 333) was a short highway in south–central Minnesota, which runs from the St. Peter Regional Treatment Center facility in St. Peter and continues for 0.5 miles (0.80 km) past the facility to its northern terminus at its intersection with MN 99 in St. Peter. The roadway is located in Nicollet County.

The route was authorized c. 1983. MN 333 was removed by the 2008 Legislature, but the route was still listed in the trunk highway log as of 2009 and was not eliminated until 2010.
