= Miesville, Minnesota =

City in Minnesota, United States

Miesville
- City
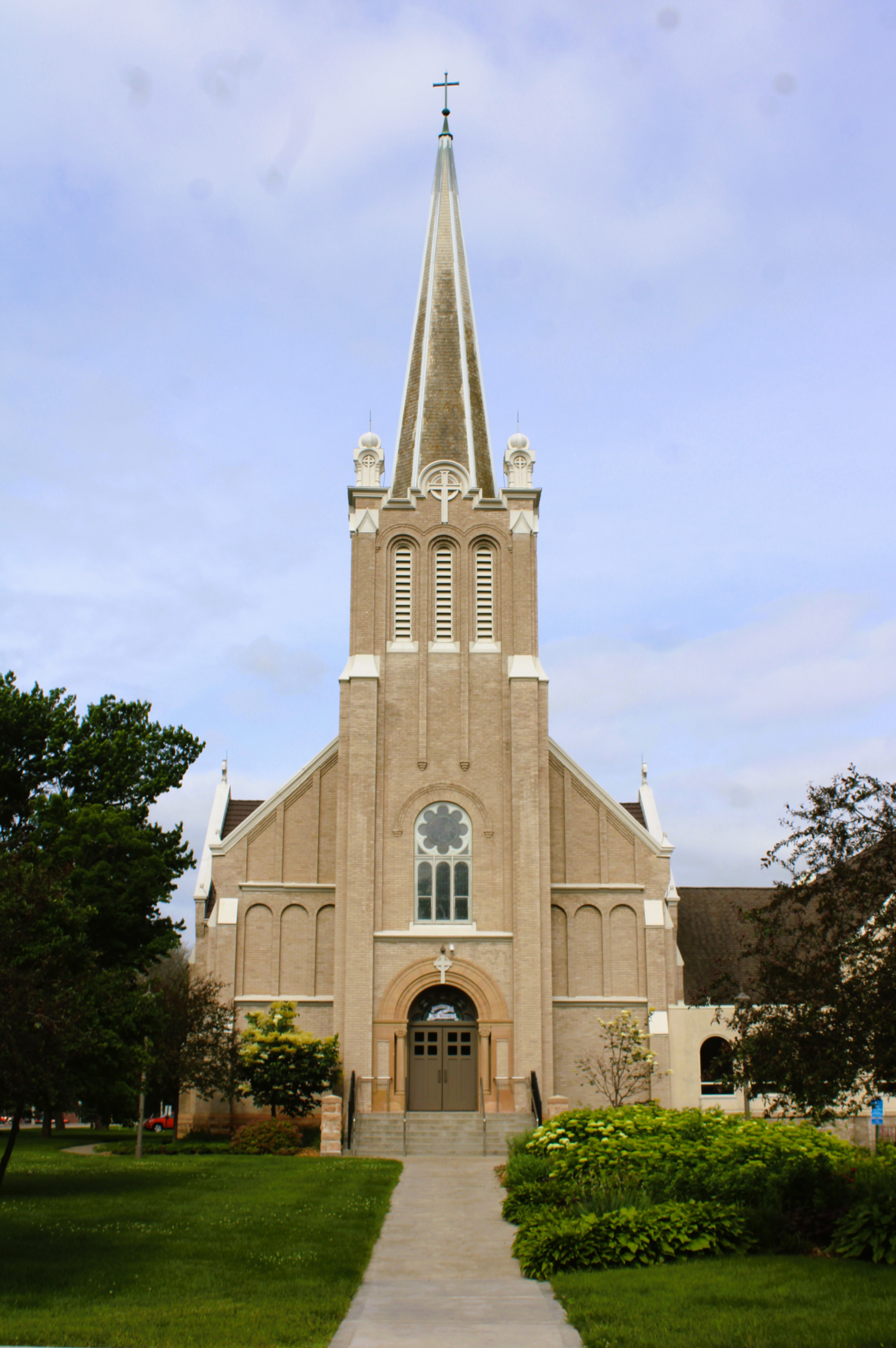
- St. Joseph Catholic Church

- Location of the city of Miesville within Dakota County, Minnesota
- Coordinates: 44°35′55″N 92°48′27″W
- Country: United States
- State: Minnesota
- County: Dakota

Area
  - Total: 1.75 sq mi (4.52 km^{2})
  - Land: 1.75 sq mi (4.52 km^{2})
  - Water: 0 sq mi (0.00 km^{2})
- Elevation: 935 ft (285 m)

Population (2020)
  - Total: 138
  - Density: 79/sq mi (30.5/km^{2})
- Time zone: UTC-6 (Central (CST))
  - Summer (DST): UTC-5 (CDT)
- Area code: 651
- FIPS code: 27-42092
- GNIS feature ID: 0647830

Miesville (/ˈmiːzvɪl/ MEEZ-vil) is a city in Dakota County, Minnesota, United States. As of the 2020 census, Miesville had a population of 138.

U.S. Highway 61 serves as a main route in the community. Minnesota Highways 20, 50, and 316 are nearby.

Miesville is home to an amateur baseball team, the Miesville Mudhens, which participate in Town Team Baseball.

== History ==
Miesville was founded in 1874 by John Mies, and named for him. A post office called Miesville was established in 1884, and remained in operation until 1903.

John Mies built a saloon, restaurant and boarding house in Miesville in 1874. The building became a grocery store, saloon and post office in 1888 and became the Kings Restaurant in the 1980s.

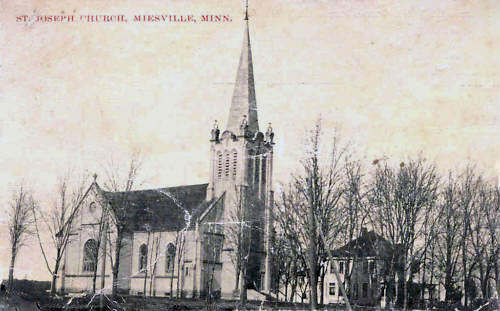
St. Joseph Catholic Church, Miesville, Dakota County, Minnesota in 1910

The Saint Joseph Catholic Church of Douglas was founded in the Spring of 1873 in what became Miesville. The first Saint Joseph Catholic Church building was erected in 1907 but struck by lightning on August 27, 1913. The church was rebuilt and dedicated on October 15, 1914. The congregation has been historically a mixture of Irish and German with an occasional Scandinavian convert allowed in.

Baseball has been played in Miesville since the 1920s. The name of the team has been the Mudhens since 1948.

== Geography ==
According to the United States Census Bureau, the city has a total area of 1.80 square miles (4.66 km^{2}), all land.

Miesville is located in the southeast part of Douglas Township.

The Miesville Ravine Park Reserve is located near Miesville at the confluence of Trout Brook and the Cannon River.

== Demographics ==
The population of Miesville was 23 in 1923 with three business establishments. In 2009 the population was 135.

Historical population
Census	Pop.	Note	%±
1960	126		—
1970	192		52.4%
1980	179		−6.8%
1990	135		−24.6%
2000	135		0.0%
2010	125		−7.4%
2020	138		10.4%
U.S. Decennial Census

=== 2010 census ===
As of the census of 2010, there were 125 people, 52 households, and 33 families living in the city. The population density was 69.4 inhabitants per square mile (26.8/km^{2}). There were 57 housing units at an average density of 31.7 per square mile (12.2/km^{2}). The racial makeup of the city was 100.0% White.

There were 52 households, of which 21.2% had children under the age of 18 living with them, 53.8% were married couples living together, 7.7% had a female householder with no husband present, 1.9% had a male householder with no wife present, and 36.5% were non-families. 30.8% of all households were made up of individuals, and 23.1% had someone living alone who was 65 years of age or older. The average household size was 2.40 and the average family size was 3.03.

The median age in the city was 48.8 years. 20% of residents were under the age of 18; 6.4% were between the ages of 18 and 24; 20% were from 25 to 44; 28.8% were from 45 to 64; and 24.8% were 65 years of age or older. The gender makeup of the city was 44.0% male and 56.0% female.

=== 2000 census ===
As of the census of 2000, there were 135 people, 52 households, and 35 families living in the city. The population density was 74.8 inhabitants per square mile (28.9/km^{2}). There were 54 housing units at an average density of 29.9 per square mile (11.5/km^{2}). The racial makeup of the city was 100.00% White.

There were 52 households, out of which 25.0% had children under the age of 18 living with them, 61.5% were married couples living together, 5.8% had a female householder with no husband present, and 30.8% were non-families. 19.2% of all households were made up of individuals, and 11.5% had someone living alone who was 65 years of age or older. The average household size was 2.52 and the average family size was 2.97.

In the city, the population was spread out, with 20.7% under the age of 18, 6.7% from 18 to 24, 24.4% from 25 to 44, 26.7% from 45 to 64, and 21.5% who were 65 years of age or older. The median age was 42 years. For every 100 females, there were 104.5 males. For every 100 females age 18 and over, there were 122.9 males.

The median income for a household in the city was $53,750, and the median income for a family was $53,125. Males had a median income of $31,786 versus $31,875 for females. The per capita income for the city was $19,931. There were 10.3% of families and 9.9% of the population living below the poverty line, including 21.9% of under eighteens and none of those over 64.
