= U.S. Route 61 in Minnesota =

Segment of American highway

U.S. Highway 61
- US 61 highlighted in red

Route information
- Maintained by MnDOT
- Length: 164.93 mi (265.43 km)
- Existed: November 26, 1926–present
- Tourist routes: Great River Road

Major junctions
- South end: US 61 / US 14 / WIS 16 at La Crescent
- I-90 at Dakota, near La Crescent; US 14 at Winona; US 63 at Lake City; US 63 at Red Wing; MN 55 at Hastings; US 10 at Denmark Township; I-494 at Newport; I-94 / US 10 at Saint Paul; I-694 at Maplewood; US 8 at Forest Lake
- North end: I-35 at Wyoming

Location
- Country: United States
- State: Minnesota
- Counties: Houston, Winona, Wabasha, Goodhue, Dakota, Washington, Ramsey, Chisago

Highway system
- United States Numbered Highway System; List; Special; Divided; Minnesota Trunk Highway System; Interstate; US; State; Legislative; Scenic
← MN 60	→ MN 61

U.S. Highway 61 (US 61) is a U.S. Highway in southeastern and east-central Minnesota, which runs from the Mississippi River Bridge at La Crescent and continues north to its northern terminus at its junction with Interstate 35 (I-35) at the city of Wyoming.

US 61 in Minnesota is 165 miles (266 km) long. It connects the cities of La Crescent, Winona, Wabasha, Lake City, Red Wing, Hastings, Cottage Grove, Saint Paul, Forest Lake, and Wyoming.

== Route description ==
US 61 enters Minnesota at La Crescent on the River Bridge over the Mississippi River between La Crescent and La Crosse. US 61 runs concurrently with US 14 and State Highway 16 (MN 16) as it enters the state. The four-lane divided highway continues north through La Crescent. US 61 follows the Mississippi River in southeast Minnesota through the cities of Winona, Wabasha, Lake City, and Red Wing.

US 61 is a two-lane roadway between Wabasha and Red Wing. It crosses the Mississippi River at Hastings over the Hastings Bridge and joins US 10 at Cottage Grove. US 61 and US 10 run concurrently as a freeway between Cottage Grove and Saint Paul. In Saint Paul, US 61 follows I-94 for a short distance, then Mounds Boulevard, East 7th Street, and Arcade Street. It then proceeds north to Maplewood, where it becomes a four-lane highway named Maplewood Drive to White Bear Lake. Between I-694 and the central business district of White Bear Lake, the road serves one of the Twin Cities region's major car dealership areas. After leaving White Bear Lake, US 61 is a two-lane roadway again to Forest Lake and then to its northern terminus in Wyoming. US 61 closely parallels I-35E and I-35 from Saint Paul to Wyoming.

About 120 miles (190 km) of US 61 from La Crescent to Cottage Grove is officially designated the Disabled American Veterans Highway. The Minnesota section of US 61 is defined as unmarked legislative routes 3, 104, 102 and 1, in the Minnesota Statutes, but it is not marked with these numbers.

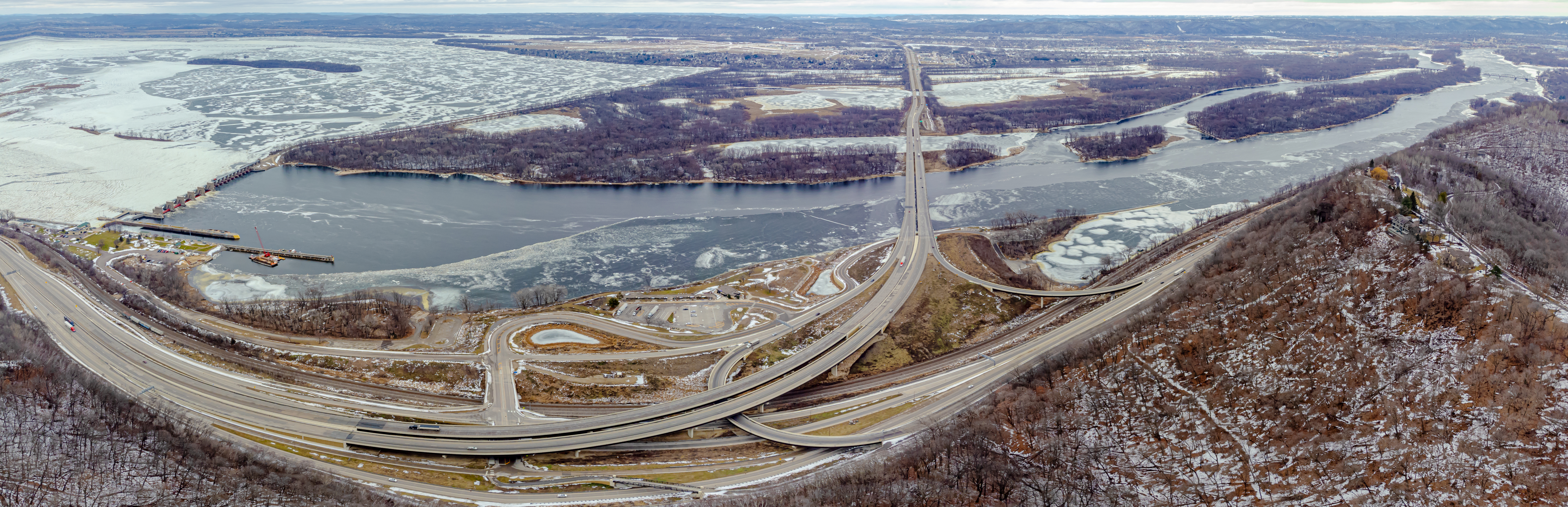
US 14/US 61 junction with I-90

== History ==
US 61 in Minnesota is an original U.S. Highway, established on November 11, 1926. It originally extended north to the Canadian border at Grand Portage, but it was cut back to its present terminus in 1991. The portion between Duluth and Grand Portage is now MN 61. Segments of the old alignment that parallel MN 61 and I-35 have been designated County Road 61 (CR 61).

In 1929, the only unpaved portions were from Hastings to Wabasha and from Winona to the Wisconsin state line. It was completely paved by 1940.

The expressway sections south of Wabasha were built in the 1960s and the 1970s. The four-lane divided highway section between Red Wing and MN 316 near Miesville was completed in 1997. The freeway section of US 61 between Cottage Grove and I-494 at Newport was completed in 2007.

The US 61 Hastings High Bridge received considerable attention from increased bridge inspections in 2008 after the August 1, 2007, I-35W Bridge collapse in Minneapolis. The Hastings High Bridge, a steel arch structure built in 1951, was structurally deficient and showed considerable deterioration. It was also a notorious traffic bottleneck because it had only one lane each way and discharged southbound US 61 traffic into downtown Hastings. The bridge was replaced in 2013.

== Major intersections ==
County	Location	mi	km	Exit	Destinations	Notes
Mississippi River		0.000	0.000		US 14 east / US 61 south / WIS 16 east / Alt. I-90 east – La Crosse	Wisconsin state line
Mississippi River		0.000	0.000	La Crosse West Channel Bridge		
Houston	La Crescent	1.712	2.755		MN 16 west (Historic Bluff Country Scenic Byway) / Great River Road south / CSAH 6 west to MN 26 – Hokah, Rushford	Northern end of MN 16 concurrency; southern end of Great River Road concurrency
Winona	Dresbach Township	4.074	6.556	276	I-90 east – La Crosse, Tomah, Madison	Northern end of I-90 Alt. concurrency; southern end of I-90 concurrency
Winona	Dresbach	6.636	10.680	273B	Dresbach	No northbound entrance; signed as exits 273B and 273A northbound
Winona	Dresbach	7.087	11.405	273A	Dresbach	Southbound exit and northbound entrance
Winona	Dakota	8.736	14.059	270	I-90 west – Albert Lea	Northern end of I-90 concurrency
Winona	Dakota	8.925	14.363	9	CR 12 / CR 101 – Dakota	Southbound exit and northbound entrance; I-90 exit 271 (northbound)
Winona	Richmond Township	17.438	28.064		CSAH 7 / Great River Road Spur – Pickwick	
Winona	Winona	25.688	41.341		MN 43 – Rushford, Wisconsin, Minnesota State College Southeast Technical	
Winona	Winona	27.159	43.708		CSAH 44 / Great River Road Spur – Winona State University, MN Marine Art Museum	
Winona	Winona	29.522	47.511		US 14 west / Pelzer Street – Rochester, St. Marys University	Northern end of US 14 concurrency
Winona	Rollingstone Township	46.118	74.220		MN 248 west – Rollingstone, Altura, Minnesota City	
Wabasha	Weaver	46.740	75.221		MN 74 south – Whitewater State Park, St. Charles	
Wabasha	Greenfield Township	53.979	86.871		MN 42 south / CSAH 18 – Plainview	
Wabasha	Wabasha	60.172	96.837		MN 60 (Laura Ingalls Wilder Historic Highway) to Great River Road (Wisconsin Route) – Zumbro Falls, Wabasha, Wisconsin, National Eagle Center	
Wabasha	Lake City	74.005	119.100		US 63 south (Lyon Avenue / Laura Ingalls Wilder Historic Highway) – Zumbro Falls, Rochester	Southern end of US 63 concurrency
Goodhue	Red Wing	88.957– 89.424	143.162– 143.914		MN 292 / Great River Road Spur	Both ends of MN 292 loop
Goodhue	Red Wing	91.047	146.526		US 63 north / MN 58 south (Plum Street) – Minnesota State College Southeast Technical, Wisconsin	Northern end of US 63 concurrency
Goodhue	Red Wing	96.561	155.400		MN 19 west – Cannon Falls	
Goodhue	Red Wing	97.701	157.235		CSAH 18 (Prairie Island Boulevard) – Prairie Island Indian Community, Treasure Island Resort & Casino, Lock and Dam No. 3	
Goodhue	Welch Township	101.142	162.772		CSAH 7 (Welch Village Road) – Welch, Welch Village	
Goodhue	Welch Township	104.480	168.144		MN 316 north / Great River Road north – Hastings	Northern end of Great River Road concurrency
Dakota	Douglas Township	107.588	173.146		MN 50 west to MN 20 – Hampton, Cannon Falls	
Dakota	Hastings	115.706	186.211		MN 316 south / Great River Road south	Southern end of Great River Road concurrency
Dakota	Hastings	115.806	186.372		Great River Road Spur (21st Street)	
Dakota	Hastings	116.310	187.183		18th Street East	Former MN 291 east
Dakota	Hastings	116.848	188.049		MN 55 west	
Dakota	Hastings	117.407	188.948		CSAH 42 west (2nd Street) / Great River Road (National Route) north	South ernend of Great River Road (National Route) concurrency; US 61 south of here is an alternate route of the Great River Road
Mississippi River		117.458– 117.810	189.030– 189.597		Hastings Bridge	
Washington	Denmark Township	119.120	191.705		US 10 east / Great River Road (National Route) south / I-94 Alt. east – Prescott	Northern end of Great River Road concurrency; southern end of I-94 Alt./US 10 concurrency
Washington	Cottage Grove	119.966	193.067		MN 95 north (Manning Avenue) – Stillwater	
Washington	Cottage Grove	122.826– 123.270	197.669– 198.384	—	CSAH 19 / CR 19A (Innovation Road)	Interchange; southern end of freeway
Washington	Cottage Grove	124.050– 124.579	199.639– 200.490	—	Jamaica Avenue	Interchange
Washington	Cottage Grove	125.952	202.700	—	Grange Boulevard / 80th Street	Interchange
Washington	St. Paul Park	127.730– 128.236	205.562– 206.376	127	CSAH 22 (70th Street) / Summit Avenue	Interchange
Washington	Newport	129.183– 129.700	207.900– 208.732	129	Glen Road	Interchange
Washington	Newport	130.053– 130.450	209.300– 209.939	130A	I-494 / Great River Road (National Route) south	Southern end of Great River Road concurrency; interchange; I-494 exit 63
Ramsey	St. Paul	130.665	210.285	130B	Maxwell Avenue / Bailey Road	Interchange; northern end of freeway
Ramsey	St. Paul	134.956	217.191		Great River Road (National Route) north (Warner Road / CR 36)	Northern end of Great River Road concurrency
Ramsey	St. Paul	135.550	218.147		I-94 east (US 12) / East 3rd Street	Northern end of I-94 Alt. concurrency; southern end of I-94/US 12 concurrency; US 61 south follows exit 244; no access from US 61 south to 3rd Street or 3rd Street to US 61 north
Ramsey	St. Paul	136.685	219.973		I-94 west / US 10 west (US 12) / Kellogg Boulevard / Mounds Boulevard	Northern end of I-94/US 10/US 12 concurrency; US 61 north follows exit 243
Ramsey	St. Paul	137.424	221.162		MN 5 west (7th Street)	Southern end of MN 5 concurrency
Ramsey	St. Paul	138.014	222.112		MN 5 east (East 7th Street)	Northern end of MN 5 concurrency
Ramsey	Maplewood	141.464– 141.754	227.664– 228.131		MN 36 – Stillwater	Interchange
Ramsey	Vadnais Heights	143.461– 143.586	230.878– 231.079		I-694	Interchange; I-694 exit 48
Ramsey	Vadnais Heights–Gem Lake line	144.467	232.497		CSAH 15 (County E)	Former MN 244 north
Ramsey	White Bear Lake	146.726	236.133		CSAH 96 west	Former MN 96 west
Ramsey	White Bear Lake	147.822	237.896		MN 96 east – Stillwater	
Washington	Forest Lake	159.295	256.360		MN 97 west – Lino Lakes, Twin Cities	Southern end of MN 97 concurrency
Washington	Forest Lake	159.615	256.875		MN 97 east	Northern end of MN 97 concurrency
Washington	Forest Lake	161.567– 161.705	260.017– 260.239		US 8 – Taylors Falls	Interchange
Chisago	Wyoming	164.858	265.313		CSAH 22 (Wyoming Trail)	Southern end of CR 22 concurrency; former MN 98 east
Chisago	Wyoming	165.111	265.720		CSAH 30 north (Forest Boulevard) / Old US 61	Former US 61 north
Chisago	Wyoming	165.487	266.326		I-35 / CSAH 22 west – St. Paul, Minneapolis, Duluth	Northern end of CR 22 concurrency; interchange; I-35 exit 135
1.000 mi = 1.609 km; 1.000 km = 0.621 mi: Concurrency terminus

== See also ==
- "Highway 61 Revisited" (song) and album

U.S. Route 61
Previous state: Wisconsin	Minnesota	Next state: Terminus
