= Minnesota State Highway 316 =

State highway in Minnesota, United States

Trunk Highway 316
- MN 316 highlighted in red

Route information
- Maintained by MnDOT
- Length: 9.809 mi (15.786 km)
- Existed: April 24, 1959–present
- Tourist routes: Great River Road

Major junctions
- South end: US 61 near Miesville
- North end: US 61 in Hastings

Location
- Country: United States
- State: Minnesota
- Counties: Goodhue, Dakota

Highway system
- Minnesota Trunk Highway System; Interstate; US; State; Legislative; Scenic
← MN 313	→ MN 317

State Highway 316 (MN 316) is a highway in southeast Minnesota, which runs from its first intersection with U.S. Highway 61 in Welch Township, near Miesville; and continues north to its second intersection with U.S. Highway 61 in the city of Hastings.

Highway 316 is 10 miles (16 km) in length.

== Route description ==
Highway 316 serves as a north–south route in southeast Minnesota between Welch Township and the city of Hastings. The route is located just west of the Mississippi River. Highway 316 and adjacent U.S. 61 are part of the Great River Road.

It is also known as Red Wing Boulevard and Polk Avenue at various points throughout its route.

The southern end of the route passes through the Richard J. Dorer State Forest.

Highway 316 functions as a shortcut along U.S. 61 between Red Wing and Hastings.

The route is legally defined as Route 316 in the Minnesota Statutes.

Most of the highway has a 60 mph speed limit, which was raised from 55 mph in 2017. Approaching Hastings from the south, the speed limit drops to 45 mph near Michael Avenue, and further drops to 35 mph at Tuttle Drive.

== History ==
Highway 316 was authorized on April 24, 1959.

The route was paved at the time it was marked.

== Major intersections ==
County	Location	mi	km	Destinations	Notes
Goodhue	Welch Township	0.000	0.000	US 61 / Great River Road south – Miesville, Red Wing	
Dakota	Ravenna Township	4.087	6.577	CSAH 68 (200th Street E) – Prairie Island Indian Community, Treasure Island Resort & Casino, Lock and Dam No. 3	
Dakota	Ravenna Township	5.468	8.800	CSAH 62 (190th Street E)	
Dakota	Marshan Township	7.096	11.420	CSAH 91 (Nicolai Avenue)	
Dakota	Hastings	9.814	15.794	US 61 / Great River Road north	
1.000 mi = 1.609 km; 1.000 km = 0.621 mi
