= Laura Ingalls Wilder Historic Highway =

The Laura Ingalls Wilder Historic Highway is a named road connecting historic areas that relate to the life of author Laura Ingalls Wilder, best known for writing Little House on the Prairie. The highway was first designated in 1995 as U.S. Route 14 from Lake Benton in southwest Minnesota to Mankato in the south-central part of the state. Since then, it has been extended into South Dakota, Iowa, and Wisconsin.

Within Minnesota, the highway is primarily made up of US 14 from the South Dakota border eastward to Rochester at U.S. Route 63. A branch extends north on 63 to Lake City, Minnesota where it briefly runs along U.S. Route 61 before following Minnesota State Highway 60 to the Wisconsin border. From Rochester, the highway also runs south along US 63 until the intersection with Minnesota State Highway 16 near Spring Valley. From there, it turns east until meeting U.S. Route 52 near Preston, following that road to the Iowa border.
