= Legislative route (Minnesota) =

Highway type in Minnesota, U.S.

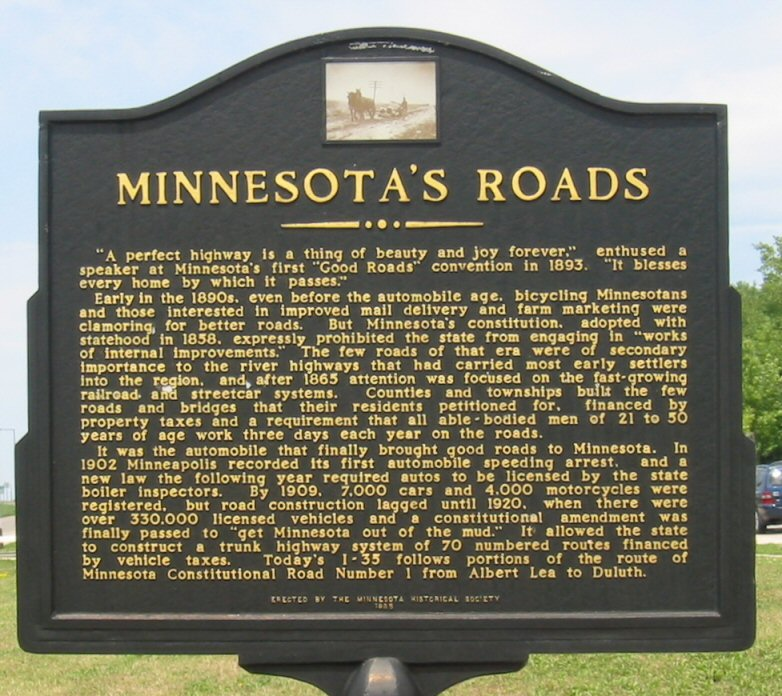
This sign, at a rest area on Interstate 35 just north of the Iowa border, describes the process that went into creating Minnesota's highway system.

In the U.S. state of Minnesota, a legislative route is a highway number defined by the Minnesota State Legislature. The routes from 1 to 70 are constitutional routes, defined as part of the Babcock Amendment to the Minnesota State Constitution, passed November 2, 1920. All of them were listed in the constitution until a 1974 rewrite. Though they are now listed separately in §161.114 of the Minnesota Statutes, the definitions are legally considered to be part of the constitution, and cannot be altered or removed without an amendment. Legislative routes with numbers greater than 70 can be added or deleted by the legislature.

Until 1933 Constitutional Routes corresponded exactly to the number marked on the highways, but this is no longer necessarily the case. In fact, it is common for CR highways to be composed of several different trunk highways. When the U.S. Highway system was created in 1926, many of these roads were made up of one or more U.S. highways. Today, they now use a mix of Minnesota state highways, U.S. highways, and Interstate highways.

Constitutional Route 1 is currently one of the most complex routes, composed of:

- U.S. Highway 65 from the Iowa border to Albert Lea, Minnesota
- Interstate 35 to Faribault
- Minnesota State Highway 3 and MN-149 to Saint Paul
- U.S. Highway 61 to Wyoming
- Interstate 35 to Rush City
- Minnesota State Highway 361 to Rock Creek
- Minnesota State Highway 23 through Hinckley
- the MN-73/27 loop through Moose Lake
- Interstate 35 between Moose Lake and MN-210
- the MN-210/45 loop through Carlton
- Interstate 35 to Duluth
- Minnesota State Highway 61 to the Canadian border

However, the route can be considered to be superseded along almost its entire length by Interstate 35 (and I-35E) and Minnesota State Highway 61. By contrast, Constitutional Route 58 still has the same marked number and extent that it did in 1920.

There is some ambiguity in how literally the Minnesota Department of Transportation must interpret the constitutional routes. In some cases, the routes no longer directly serve communities for which they were once designated, but are routed along nearby highways instead.

== List of routes ==
=== Constitutional Routes 1–70 ===
- Constitutional Route 1: Iowa to Ontario via Albert Lea, Owatonna, Faribault, Northfield, Farmington, St. Paul, White Bear, Forest Lake, Wyoming, Rush City, Pine City, Hinckley, Sandstone, Moose Lake, Carlton, Duluth, Two Harbors, and Grand Marais
- Constitutional Route 2: Duluth to North Dakota via Carlton, McGregor, Aitkin, Brainerd, Motley, Staples, Wadena, Detroit, and Moorhead
- Constitutional Route 3: Wisconsin to North Dakota via La Crescent, Winona, Kellogg, Wabasha, Lake City, Red Wing, Hastings, St. Paul, Minneapolis, Osseo, Champlin, Anoka, Elk River, Big Lake, St. Cloud, Albany, Sauk Centre, Alexandria, Elbow Lake, Fergus Falls, and Breckenridge
- Constitutional Route 4: Iowa to International Falls via Jackson, Windom, Sanborn, Redwood Falls, Morton, Olivia, Willmar, Paynesville, Sauk Centre, Long Prairie, Wadena, Park Rapids, Itasca State Park, and Bemidji
- Constitutional Route 5: Iowa to Swan River via Blue Earth, Winnebago, Mankato, St. Peter, Le Sueur, Jordan, Shakopee, Minneapolis, Cambridge, Mora, and McGregor
- Constitutional Route 6: Iowa to Manitoba via Luverne, Pipestone, Lake Benton, Ivanhoe, Canby, Madison, Bellingham, Odessa, Ortonville, Graceville, Dumont, Wheaton, Breckenridge, Moorhead, Kragnes, Georgetown, Perley, Hendrum, Ada, Crookston, Warren, Donaldson, and Hallock
- Constitutional Route 7: Winona to South Dakota via St. Charles, Rochester, Kasson, Dodge Center, Claremont, Owatonna, Waseca, Mankato, St. Peter, New Ulm, Springfield, Tracy, and Lake Benton
- Constitutional Route 8: Duluth to North Dakota via Floodwood, Swan River, Grand Rapids, Cass Lake, Bemidji, Bagley, Erskine, Crookston, and East Grand Forks
- Constitutional Route 9: La Crescent to South Dakota via Hokah, Houston, Rushford, Lanesboro, Preston, Fountain, Spring Valley, Austin, Albert Lea, Blue Earth, Fairmont, Jackson, Worthington, and Luverne
- Constitutional Route 10: Minneapolis to Wheaton via Montrose, Cokato, Litchfield, Willmar, Benson, Morris, and Herman
- Constitutional Route 11: Duluth to Donaldson via Eveleth, Virginia, Cook, Orr, Cusson, International Falls, Baudette, Warroad, Roseau, and Greenbush
- Constitutional Route 12: Wisconsin to Madison via St. Paul, Minneapolis, Hopkins, Norwood, Glencoe, Olivia, Granite Falls, Montevideo, and Dawson
- Constitutional Route 13: Albert Lea to Jordan via Waseca, Waterville, Montgomery, and New Prague
- Constitutional Route 14: Ivanhoe to Gaylord via Marshall, Redwood Falls, Morton, and Winthrop
- Constitutional Route 15: Iowa to Winthrop via Fairmont, Madelia, and New Ulm
- Constitutional Route 16: southwest of Mankato to Worthington via Madelia, St. James, Windom, and Fulda
- Constitutional Route 17: Fulda to Granite Falls to Slayton, Garvin, and Marshall
- Constitutional Route 18: Elk River to east of Brainerd via Princeton, Milaca, and Onamia
- Constitutional Route 19: Brainerd to Cass Lake via Pine River and Walker
- Constitutional Route 20: Iowa to Douglas via Canton, Harmony, Preston, Fountain, Chatfield, Oronoco, Pine Island, Zumbrota, and Cannon Falls
- Constitutional Route 21: Zumbrota to St. Peter via Kenyon, Faribault, Le Sueur Center, and Cleveland
- Constitutional Route 22: St. Peter to Paynesville via Gaylord, Glencoe, Hutchinson, and Litchfield
- Constitutional Route 23: Paynesville to south of Hinckley via St. Cloud, Foley, Milaca, Ogilvie, and Mora
- Constitutional Route 24: Litchfield to St. Cloud
- Constitutional Route 25: Belle Plaine to Big Lake via Norwood, Watertown, Montrose, Buffalo, and Monticello
- Constitutional Route 26: Benson to Ortonville
- Constitutional Route 27: St. Cloud to Brainerd via Sauk Rapids, Royalton, and Little Falls
- Constitutional Route 28: Little Falls to South Dakota via Sauk Centre, Glenwood, Starbuck, Morris, Graceville, and Browns Valley
- Constitutional Route 29: Glenwood to west of Wadena via Alexandria, Parkers Prairie, and Deer Creek
- Constitutional Route 30: Fergus Falls to Erskine via Pelican Rapids, Detroit Lakes, and Mahnomen
- Constitutional Route 31: Ada to Mahnomen
- Constitutional Route 32: east of Crookston to Greenbush via Red Lake Falls, Thief River Falls, and Middle River
- Constitutional Route 33: Thief River Falls to Warren
- Constitutional Route 34: Detroit to west of Grand Rapids via Park Rapids, Walker, and Remer
- Constitutional Route 35: Mille Lacs Lake to Ely via Aitkin, Grand Rapids, Hibbing, Chisholm, Buhl, Mountain Iron, Virginia, Gilbert, McKinley, Biwabik, Aurora, and Tower
- Constitutional Route 36: Fergus Falls to east of Henning
- Constitutional Route 37: Little Falls to Motley
- Constitutional Route 38: Montevideo to Starbuck via Benson
- Constitutional Route 39: Mankato to west of Albert Lea via Mapleton, Minnesota Lake, and Wells
- Constitutional Route 40: Iowa to Owatonna via Lyle, Austin, and Blooming Prairie
- Constitutional Route 41: Blooming Prairie to Hayfield
- Constitutional Route 42: east of Rochester to Kellogg via Elgin and Plainview
- Constitutional Route 43: Rushford to Winona
- Constitutional Route 44: Hokah to Canton via Caledonia
- Constitutional Route 45: Wisconsin to St. Paul via Stillwater and Lake Elmo
- Constitutional Route 46: Wisconsin to Wyoming via Taylors Falls and Center City
- Constitutional Route 47: Slayton to Pipestone
- Constitutional Route 48: west of Granite Falls to Canby via Clarkfield
- Constitutional Route 49: east of Montevideo to south of Willmar via Clara City
- Constitutional Route 50: Cannon Falls to Minneapolis via Farmington
- Constitutional Route 51: Shakopee to north of Shakopee
- Constitutional Route 52: south of Minneapolis to Fort Snelling towards St. Paul
- Constitutional Route 53: Hastings to South St. Paul
- Constitutional Route 54: Elbow Lake to Herman
- Constitutional Route 55: northwest of Carlton to Cloquet
- Constitutional Route 56: east of Austin to Kenyon via Brownsdale, Hayfield, Dodge Center, and West Concord
- Constitutional Route 57: Mantorville to south of Mantorville
- Constitutional Route 58: Zumbrota to Red Wing
- Constitutional Route 59: Iowa to Lake City via Spring Valley, Stewartville, Rochester, Zumbro Falls
- Constitutional Route 60: Faribault to Madison Lake via Morristown and Waterville
- Constitutional Route 61: Deer River to Big Falls
- Constitutional Route 62: Anoka to St. Paul
- Constitutional Route 63: south of Forest Lake to Minneapolis
- Constitutional Route 64: north of Fergus Falls to south of Moorhead via Rothsay and Barnesville
- Constitutional Route 65: Bagley to south of Red Lake Falls via Clearbrook, Gonvick, Gully, Brooks, and Terrebonne
- Constitutional Route 66: Montevideo to north of Appleton
- Constitutional Route 67: Echo to Granite Falls
- Constitutional Route 68: Marshall to Canby via Minneota
- Constitutional Route 69: Buffalo to Paynesville via Maple Lake, Annandale, and Eden Valley
- Constitutional Route 70: west of New Ulm to Hector via Fort Ridgely and Fairfax

=== Legislative Routes 71–140 ===
- Legislative Route 71: Little Falls, Onamia, Isle, McGrath, and Moose Lake
- Legislative Route 72: Bemidji, Waskish, Baudette
- Legislative Route 73: Zumbrota, Mazeppa, Zumbro Falls, and Wabasha
- Legislative Route 74: Weaver, St. Charles, and Chatfield
- Legislative Route 75: Winona to Wisconsin
- Legislative Route 76: Wilson, Houston, and Caledonia to Iowa
- Legislative Route 77: Rushford, Chatfield, Stewartville, and Hayfield
- Legislative Route 78: Rushford to Mabel
- Legislative Route 79: Harmony to Iowa
- Legislative Route 80: Wykoff to Preston
- Legislative Route 81: Austin to LeRoy
- Legislative Route 82: Blooming Prairie, Ellendale, Mapleton, and St. James
- Legislative Route 83: Mankato to New Ulm
- Legislative Route 84: Sleepy Eye, St. James, and Sherburn to Iowa
- Legislative Route 85: Windom, Worthington, and Bigelow to Iowa
- Legislative Route 86: Iowa to Lakefield, Windom
- Legislative Route 87: Wells, Kiester to Iowa
- Legislative Route 88: South Dakota to Jasper, Pipestone, Marshall, and Montevideo
- Legislative Route 89: Pipestone to South Dakota
- Legislative Route 90: Ivanhoe to South Dakota
- Legislative Route 91: Iowa to Adrian, Lake Wilson, and Russell
- Legislative Route 92: Currie, Jeffers
- Legislative Route 93: Redwood Falls, Sleepy Eye
- Legislative Route 94: Hastings to Wisconsin
- Legislative Route 95: Point Douglas, Bayport, Stillwater, Taylors Falls
- Legislative Route 96: Dellwood, White Bear Lake
- Legislative Route 97: Forest Lake, Taylors Falls
- Legislative Route 98: Forest Lake, Center City
- Legislative Route 99: Le Center, Shields Lake
- Legislative Route 100: Gaylord, Henderson, New Prague, Northfield, Cannon Falls and Red Wing
- Legislative Route 101: Repealed
- Legislative Route 102: Connects Constitutional Route 1 through St. Paul
- Legislative Route 103: Connects Constitutional Route 1 through Duluth
- Legislative Route 104: Connects Constitutional Route 3 through St. Paul
- Legislative Route 105: Connects Washington Avenue with Constitutional Route 5 through Minneapolis
- Legislative Route 106: Connects Constitutional Route 8 through Duluth, via the Richard I. Bong Memorial Bridge.
- Legislative Route 107: Connects Constitutional Route 10 with Washington Avenue in Minneapolis
- Legislative Route 108: St. Paul to Hennepin County.
- Legislative Route 109: St. Paul's eastern city limits to Route 1.
- Legislative Route 110: Minneapolis, Anoka, Ogilvie, Isle, and Aitkin
- Legislative Route 111: Fort Snelling to downtown St. Paul
- Legislative Route 112: St. Paul's southern city limits to St. Paul
- Legislative Route 113: St. Paul's northern city limits to Route 104.
- Legislative Route 114: Discontinued and removed
- Legislative Route 115: Eagan to St. Paul via Robert Street and the Lafayette Freeway
- Legislative Route 116: Kenyon to Minneapolis.
- Legislative Route 117: Prior Lake to White Bear.
- Legislative Route 118: Roseville to Stillwater.
- Legislative Route 119: Clara City to Excelsior.
- Legislative Route 120: Discontinued and removed
- Legislative Route 121: Gaylord to Route 5.
- Legislative Route 122: Mankato and Nicollet to south of Gaylord.
- Legislative Route 123: Repealed
- Legislative Route 124: Wells to Alden
- Legislative Route 125: Snelling Avenue and U.S. 10 from St. Paul to I-35W.
- Legislative Route 126: Repealed
- Legislative Route 127: Discontinued and removed
- Legislative Route 128: Mantorville, Wanamingo, and Hader
- Legislative Route 129: Discontinued and removed
- Legislative Route 130: Minneapolis, and Fort Snelling via Broadway Ave and Hiawatha Ave
- Legislative Route 131: Randall, and Camp Ripley Junction
- Legislative Route 132: St. Cloud, Princeton, Cambridge, and Taylors Falls
- Legislative Route 133: Braham, West Rock, and Rock Creek, to Wisconsin.
- Legislative Route 134: Grasston, and Brook Park
- Legislative Route 135: Little Falls, Long Prairie, and Osakis
- Legislative Route 136: Bemidji, and Roseau
- Legislative Route 137: Garrison, Deerwood, Crosby, and Remer
- Legislative Route 138: Walker, and Kabekona
- Legislative Route 139: Pine River, and Walker
- Legislative Route 140: Baudette, and Wheelers Point

=== Legislative Routes 141–210 ===
- Legislative Route 141: Connects Constitutional Route 4 and Constitutional Route 28 through Sauk Centre
- Legislative Route 142: Paynesville, Glenwood, and Elbow Lake to South Dakota
- Legislative Route 143: Sunburg, and Glenwood
- Legislative Route 144: Madison, Appleton, Morris, and Barrett
- Legislative Route 145: Willmar to Route 144.
- Legislative Route 146: Maynard to Route 12.
- Legislative Route 147: Appleton to Route 6.
- Legislative Route 148: Ortonville to Route 28.
- Legislative Route 149: Ortonville to South Dakota.
- Legislative Route 150: Hector to Paynesville.
- Legislative Route 151: Kimball to Winthrop.
- Legislative Route 152: Herman to Breckenridge.
- Legislative Route 153: Discontinued and removed
- Legislative Route 154: Canby to South Dakota
- Legislative Route 155: South of Madison to South Dakota.
- Legislative Route 156: Route 394 to Route 62.
- Legislative Route 157: Route 35 to Route 110.
- Legislative Route 158: International Falls to Black Bay.
- Legislative Route 159: Swan River, Nashwauk, and Little Fork
- Legislative Route 160: Tower to Red Lake.
- Legislative Route 161: Red Wing to Wisconsin.
- Legislative Route 162: Remer to Route 8.
- Legislative Route 163: Moose Lake to south of Orr.
- Legislative Route 164: Cloquet to Route 11.
- Legislative Route 165: Deer River to Route 4.
- Legislative Route 166: Ely to Route 1.
- Legislative Route 167: Virginia to Tower.
- Legislative Route 168: Itasca State Park to Mahnomen.
- Legislative Route 169: Bagley to Route 168.
- Legislative Route 170: Thief River Falls to Route 136.
- Legislative Route 171: St. Vincent to North Dakota.
- Legislative Route 172: Donaldson to North Dakota.
- Legislative Route 173: Warren to North Dakota.
- Legislative Route 174: Erskine to the Canadian border.
- Legislative Route 175: Crookston to Hendrum.
- Legislative Route 176: Halstad to North Dakota.
- Legislative Route 177: Route 32 to Route 182.
- Legislative Route 178: Crookston to Fertile.
- Legislative Route 179: Ada to Barnesville.
- Legislative Route 180: Erdahl to Ottertail.
- Legislative Route 181: Henning to Perham.
- Legislative Route 182: Route 30 to Barnesville
- Legislative Route 183: Henning to Staples.
- Legislative Route 184: Deer Creek to Route 2.
- Legislative Route 185: Sandstone to Duluth.
- Legislative Route 186: Route 110 to Askov.
- Legislative Route 187: Elk River to Route 117.
- Legislative Route 188: Buffalo to Route 110.
- Legislative Route 189: Mora to Route 132.
- Legislative Route 190: Wheaton to Browns Valley.
- Legislative Route 191: Route 190 to South Dakota.
- Legislative Route 192: Hinckley to Wisconsin.
- Legislative Route 193: Motley to Route 34, west of Walker (present-day Akeley).
- Legislative Route 194: Mendota to Route 102.
- Legislative Route 195: Albert Lea to Iowa.
- Legislative Route 196: Grand Rapids to Bigfork.
- Legislative Route 197: Park Rapids to Backus.
- Legislative Route 198: La Crescent to Iowa.
- Legislative Route 199: Austin to Iowa.
- Legislative Route 200: Route 4 near Itasca State Park to Waubun.
- Legislative Route 201: Waldorf to Mankato.
- Legislative Route 202: Eveleth to Gilbert.
- Legislative Route 203: Proctor and Duluth.
- Legislative Route 204: Connecting Route 11 to Route 103 in Duluth.
- Legislative Route 205: Herman to Alexandria.
- Legislative Route 206: Pelican Rapids to south of Perham.
- Legislative Route 207: Frazee to Menahga.
- Legislative Route 208: Starbuck to Garfield.
- Legislative Route 209: Becker, Foley, Gilman, Pierz, and Brainerd.
- Legislative Route 210: Benson to New London.

=== Legislative Routes 211–280 ===
- Legislative Route 211: Barnesville to Breckenridge.
- Legislative Route 212: Robbinsdale to New Brighton.
- Legislative Route 213: Duluth to Wisconsin.
- Legislative Route 214: Wabasha to Wisconsin.
- Legislative Route 215: Carlton to Route 185.
- Legislative Route 216: Hibbing to Eveleth.
- Legislative Route 217: Littlefork to Route 11.
- Legislative Route 218: West of Roseau to Canada.
- Legislative Route 219: Route 170 to Grygla.
- Legislative Route 220: Climax to west of Donaldson.
- Legislative Route 221: Ely to northeast of Ely.
- Legislative Route 222: Repealed
- Legislative Route 223: Leonard to Route 65.
- Legislative Route 224: Repealed
- Legislative Route 225: Repealed
- Legislative Route 226: South of Dorset to Route 34.
- Legislative Route 227: Repealed
- Legislative Route 228: Repealed
- Legislative Route 229: South of Barnesville to Pelican Rapids.
- Legislative Route 230: Route 6 near Moorhead to North Dakota.
- Legislative Route 231: Discontinued and removed
- Legislative Route 232: Repealed
- Legislative Route 233: Repealed
- Legislative Route 234: West of Laporte to Akeley.
- Legislative Route 235: Repealed
- Legislative Route 236: Discontinued and removed
- Legislative Route 237: Repealed
- Legislative Route 238: Albany, Upsala, and Little Falls.
- Legislative Route 239: Sauk Rapids to Saint Cloud.
- Legislative Route 240: Annandale to Route 3
- Legislative Route 241: St. Michael to Route 392.
- Legislative Route 242: Repealed
- Legislative Route 243: Route 95 to Wisconsin.
- Legislative Route 244: White Bear Lake to Route 96, north of Mahtomedi.
- Legislative Route 245: Route 20 to Route 50.
- Legislative Route 246: Nerstrand to Northfield.
- Legislative Route 247: South of Zumbro Falls to Plainview.
- Legislative Route 248: Altura to Route 3, near Rollingstone.
- Legislative Route 249: Discontinued and removed
- Legislative Route 250: Lanesboro to Route 77.
- Legislative Route 251: Clarks Grove to Route 40.
- Legislative Route 252: Connecting Route 9 and Route 40 through Austin (modern-day I-90/U.S. 218 bypass).
- Legislative Route 253: Repealed
- Legislative Route 254: Repealed
- Legislative Route 255: Winnebago to Wells.
- Legislative Route 256: Repealed
- Legislative Route 257: Hanska to Route 15.
- Legislative Route 258: Repealed
- Legislative Route 259: Henderson to Le Sueur.
- Legislative Route 260: Shakopee to Edina (includes the southern part of MN 41).
- Legislative Route 261: Repealed
- Legislative Route 262: Repealed
- Legislative Route 263: Repealed
- Legislative Route 264: Round Lake to Worthington. (currently being repealed)
- Legislative Route 265: Bigelow to Iowa.
- Legislative Route 266: Repealed
- Legislative Route 267: Iona to Slayton. (currently being repealed)
- Legislative Route 268: Repealed
- Legislative Route 269: Jasper to South Dakota.
- Legislative Route 270: Hills to Route 6.
- Legislative Route 271: South Dakota to Route 90, south of Hendricks.
- Legislative Route 272: North of Milroy to Morgan.
- Legislative Route 273: Repealed
- Legislative Route 274: Repealed
- Legislative Route 275: Repealed
- Legislative Route 276: South Dakota to Route 6, east of Marietta.
- Legislative Route 277: Repealed
- Legislative Route 278: Discontinued and removed
- Legislative Route 279: Cedar Avenue from Minneapolis to Apple Valley.

=== Legislative Routes 281–350 ===
- Legislative Route 280: St. Paul to "at or near" New Brighton.
- Legislative Route 281: An alternate route for Route 103 through Duluth.
- Legislative Route 282: Jordan to Spring Lake.
- Legislative Route 283: Waubun to Route 177.
- Legislative Route 284: Waconia to Route 12.
- Legislative Route 285: Discontinued and removed
- Legislative Route 286: Marcell to Route 61.
- Legislative Route 287: Grey Eagle to Route 4.
- Legislative Route 288: Repealed
- Legislative Route 289: Route 1 to the Moose Lake Treatment Center.
- Legislative Route 290: Repealed
- Legislative Route 291: Repealed
- Legislative Route 292: Route 3 to the Minnesota Training School for Boys in Red Wing.
- Legislative Route 293: Repealed
- Legislative Route 294: Repealed
- Legislative Route 295: Repealed
- Legislative Route 296: Discontinued and removed
- Legislative Route 297: Repealed
- Legislative Route 298: Route 21 to Route 323. (currently being repealed)
- Legislative Route 299: Route 21 to the Minnesota State Academy for the Deaf. (currently being repealed)
- Legislative Route 300: Repealed
- Legislative Route 301: Repealed
- Legislative Route 302: Repealed
- Legislative Route 303: Discontinued and removed
- Legislative Route 304: Montevideo to Route 49.
- Legislative Route 305: Repealed
- Legislative Route 306: Gilbert to Biwabik.
- Legislative Route 307: East Grand Forks to North Dakota.
- Legislative Route 308: Fox to Route 218.
- Legislative Route 309: Repealed
- Legislative Route 310: Roseau to Canada.
- Legislative Route 311: Route 289 to Route 390.
- Legislative Route 312: Discontinued and removed
- Legislative Route 313: Warroad to Canada.
- Legislative Route 314: St. Francis to Forest Lake (not legally authorized).
- Legislative Route 315: International Falls to Canada.
- Legislative Route 316: Hastings to Red Wing.
- Legislative Route 317: Route 220 to North Dakota.
- Legislative Route 318: Discontinued and removed
- Legislative Route 319: Ortonville to Route 148.
- Legislative Route 320: Route 116 to Nerstrand.
- Legislative Route 321: Eden Valley to Richmond.
- Legislative Route 322: Repealed
- Legislative Route 323: Barron Road in Faribault to Legislative Route 298. (currently being repealed)
- Legislative Route 324A: Hallock to North Dakota.
- Legislative Route 325: Baudette to Canada.
- Legislative Route 326: Repealed
- Legislative Route 327. Discontinued and removed
- Legislative Route 328: Hallock to north of Lake Bronson.
- Legislative Route 329: Morris to the University of Minnesota West Central School and Experiment Station.
- Legislative Route 330: Lamberton to the University of Minnesota Southwest Experiment Station.
- Legislative Route 331: Repealed
- Legislative Route 332: Repealed
- Legislative Route 333: I-94 to U.S. 10.
- Legislative Route 334: Inver Grove Heights to Kellogg Boulevard in St. Paul.
- Legislative Route 335: Repealed
- Legislative Route 336: Dilworth to Route 392 via Clay CSAH 11.
- Legislative Route 337: Brainerd to Highway 371 (Constitutional Route 27).
- Legislative Route 338: East of Rochester to Route 391.
- Legislative Route 339: Route 45 to Wisconsin.
- Legislative Route 340: Upper Sioux Agency State Park to Granite Falls.
- Legislative Route 341: Sandstone to the Kettle River.

=== Legislative Routes 351–396 ===
Routes 380 to 385 were defined in and after 1975, and "may be added by order of the commissioner of transportation to the trunk highway system"; only 383, 384, and 385 have been added, and 385 no longer exists.

- Legislative Route 380: Shepard Road in St. Paul
- Legislative Route 381: deleted from the statutes (was a planned extension of the Lafayette Freeway northwest to I-35E)
- Legislative Route 382: part of I-35E in St. Paul (actually covered by Route 390)
- Legislative Route 383: Bloomington to Brooklyn Park
- Legislative Route 384: Eden Prairie to southeast of Minneapolis
- Legislative Route 385: deleted from the statutes (was Washington Avenue in Minneapolis)

Routes 390 to 396 were defined in and after the 1950s as portions of the Interstate Highway System "to take advantage of federal aid made available by the United States to the state of Minnesota for highway purposes".

- Legislative Route 390: Iowa to Wisconsin (I-35, I-35E, and I-535)
- Legislative Route 391: South Dakota to Wisconsin (I-90)
- Legislative Route 392: North Dakota to Wisconsin (I-94)
- Legislative Route 393: loop around the Twin Cities (I-494 and I-694)
- Legislative Route 394: alternate to Route 390 through Minneapolis (I-35W)
- Legislative Route 395: Duluth (part of I-35)
- Legislative Route 396: Duluth (extension of I-35)

Interstate 394 is not a separate legislative route, instead being parts of Route 10 and Route 107, which carried U.S. Highway 12 along the same alignment before I-394 was built.

== See also ==
- County state aid highway (CSAH)
