= Minnesota State Highway 50 =

State highway in Minnesota, United States

Trunk Highway 50
- MN 50 highlighted in red

Route information
- Maintained by MnDOT
- Length: 15.082 mi (24.272 km)
- Existed: 1920–present

Major junctions
- West end: MN 3 at Farmington
- US 52 / MN 56 at Hampton; MN 20 at Douglas Township
- East end: US 61 at Douglas Township, near Miesville

Location
- Country: United States
- State: Minnesota
- Counties: Dakota

Highway system
- Minnesota Trunk Highway System; Interstate; US; State; Legislative; Scenic
← MN 48	→ MN 51

Minnesota State Highway 50 (MN 50) is a 15.082-mile-long (24.272 km) highway in Minnesota, which runs from its intersection with State Highway 3 and Dakota County Road 74 in Farmington and continues east to its eastern terminus at its intersection with U.S. 61 and State Highway 20 near Miesville.

State Highway 50 passes through the communities of Farmington, Empire Township, Castle Rock Township, Hampton, Hampton Township, New Trier, and Douglas Township.

== Route description ==
State Highway 50 serves as an east–west route between Farmington, Hampton, New Trier, and Miesville.

The route is located in Dakota County.

State Highway 50 is also known as:

- 220th Street between Farmington and Hampton
- 240th Street East between Hampton and Miesville
- Hampton Boulevard in Hampton

State Highway 50 and adjoining County Road 74 are also known as Ash Street in the city of Farmington.

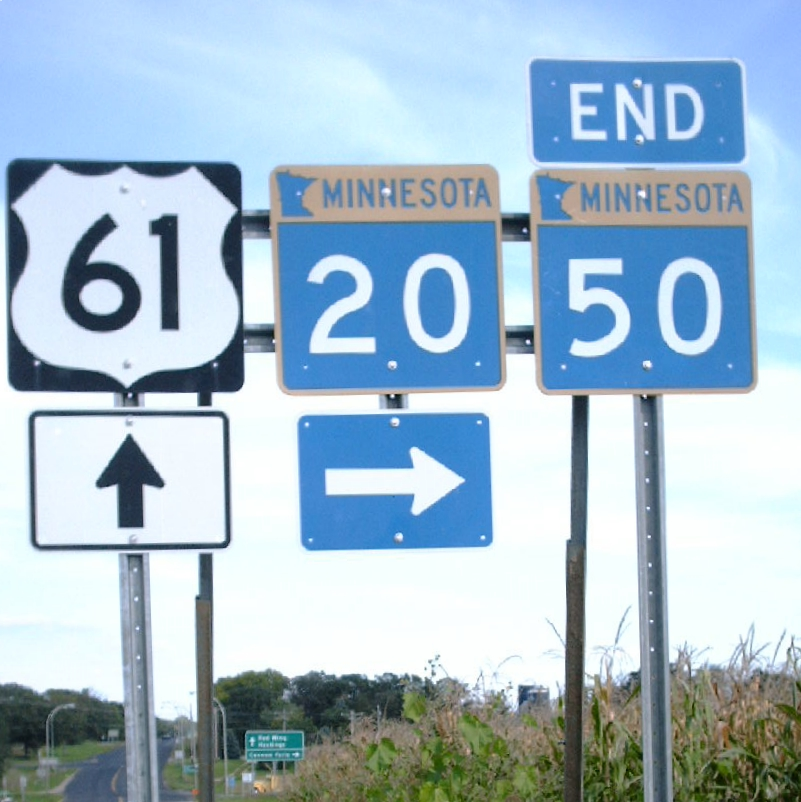
Signs at the east end of MN 50 near Miesville

== History ==
State Highway 50 was authorized in 1920 between Cannon Falls and Minneapolis. U.S. Highway 55 was routed along this highway in 1926. 55 was removed in 1934, and much of the road was replaced by U.S. Highways 52 and 65.

The route was paved between Hampton and Farmington as early as 1929.

In 1949, State Highway 50 was extended east of Hampton to U.S. 61 near Miesville along 240th Street East.

At one time, State Highway 50 had continued farther west. From 1957 to 1994, the route had continued west of Farmington on present day Dakota County Highway 50 between State Highway 3 in Farmington and Interstate 35 in Lakeville. This section had also previously been part of old U.S. Highway 65 from 1934 to 1957.

The section of Highway 50 between Hampton and Miesville was paved by 1961.

== Major intersections ==
The entire route is in Dakota County.

Location	mi	km	Destinations	Notes
Lakeville	0.000	0.000	I-35 / CSAH 5	Programmed mile 0; former western terminus
Lakeville	6.163	9.918	CSAH 23 (Cedar Avenue)	
Farmington	10.161	16.353	MN 3 north	Former west end of MN 3 overlap; current east end of CSAH 50
Farmington	10.725	17.260	MN 3 / CSAH 74 – Northfield, St. Paul	Current western terminus
Hampton	18.936– 19.029	30.475– 30.624	US 52 / MN 56 south – Randolph, Kenyon, St. Paul	Access to southbound US 52 from MN 56
Douglas Township	25.700	41.360	MN 20 south – Cannon Falls	
Douglas Township	25.775	41.481	US 61 – Hastings, Red Wing	
1.000 mi = 1.609 km; 1.000 km = 0.621 mi: Closed/former
