= Hastings Bridge =

Bridge in Minnesota, US

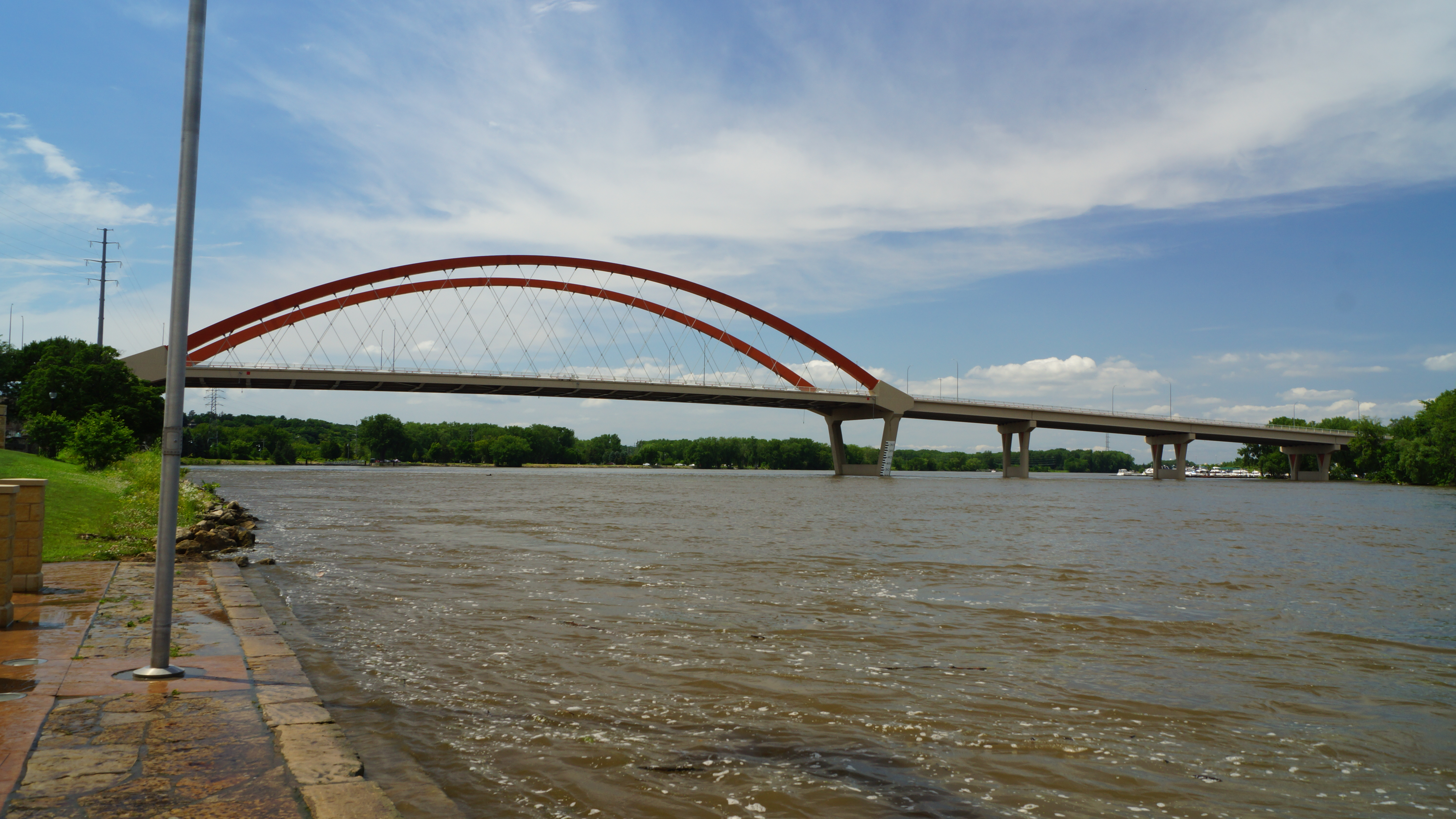
- Coordinates: 44°44′48.48″N 92°51′10.7994″W
- Carries: Four lanes of US 61
- Crosses: Mississippi River
- Locale: Hastings, Minnesota, U.S.
- Maintained by: Minnesota Department of Transportation
- ID number: 19004

Characteristics
- Design: Free standing tied-arch bridge
- Total length: 1,938 ft (591 m)
- Width: 71.9 ft (21.9 m)
- Longest span: 545 ft (166 m)
- Clearance below: 62.3 ft (19.0 m)

History
- Opened: June 2013

Statistics
- Daily traffic: 32,500

Location
- Interactive map of Hastings Bridge

The Hastings Bridge is a free standing tied-arch bridge that spans the Mississippi River in Hastings, Minnesota, United States. It was designed by Parsons and was built in 2013 by Lunda Construction Company for $119,830,000. The Hastings Bridge replaces the former Hastings High Bridge, which was built in 1951 and demolished in 2013 when the replacement bridge was completed. The Hastings High Bridge had been scheduled to be torn down and replaced in 2019, but after the I-35W bridge collapse in Minneapolis, the MNDOT re-prioritized the replacement and construction of the new bridge started in 2010.

Following the August 1, 2007 collapse of the I-35W Mississippi River bridge, the Hastings High Bridge was inspected between August 20 and August 31, 2007. An executive summary of the inspection report was released on January 15, 2008, questioning whether the bridge was capable of sustaining its 40-ton posted capacity, and calling for a load analysis to be performed immediately. Because the existing bridge was obsolete and average daily traffic exceeded 30,000 vehicles, MNDOT accelerated the new bridge project to begin in 2010. Three design-build teams submitted proposals on June 30, 2010, and the contract was awarded to the joint venture Lunda/Ames.

In June 2013, two of the four lanes of the new bridge were open for traffic, and in November 2013 all four lanes opened. The new bridge cost $130 million and is the longest free-standing tied-arch bridge in North America, at a length of 545 feet. The main span is composed of arches, girders, beams, stringers, and roadway, offering four lanes of traffic plus twelve feet of mixed use pedestrian and bike path. The new bridge has an anti-icing system. Other features include: a public art mural on the south abutment wall, a scenic overlook incorporated near Levee Park, additional parking beneath the bridge, and lighting. The new bridge is expected to have a 100-year lifespan.
