= Minnesota State Highway 58 =

State highway in Minnesota, United States

Trunk Highway 58
- MN 58 highlighted in red

Route information
- Maintained by MnDOT
- Length: 23.538 mi (37.881 km)
- Existed: 1920–present

Major junctions
- South end: US 52 / MN 60 at Zumbrota
- North end: US 61 / US 63 at Red Wing

Location
- Country: United States
- State: Minnesota
- Counties: Goodhue

Highway system
- Minnesota Trunk Highway System; Interstate; US; State; Legislative; Scenic
← MN 57	→ US 59

Minnesota State Highway 58 (MN 58) is a 23.538-mile-long (37.881 km) highway in southeast Minnesota, which runs from its interchange with U.S. 52 / State Highway 60 (co-signed) in Zumbrota and continues north to its northern terminus at its intersection with U.S. Highway 61 in Red Wing.

== Route description ==
Highway 58 serves as a northeast–southwest route in southeast Minnesota between Zumbrota and Red Wing.

The roadway passes through the Richard J. Dorer State Forest between Red Wing and Hay Creek.

In the city of Red Wing, Highway 58 follows Plum Street and Bush Street.

The route is also known as Main Street in Zumbrota.

U.S. Highway 63 is concurrent with Highway 58 for one block between 3rd Street and Main Street (U.S. Highway 61) in Red Wing.

The route has one climbing lane for slow vehicles in the southbound direction, between County State Aid Highway 3 and County State Aid Highway 4.

The route is legally defined as Constitutional Route 58 in the Minnesota Statutes.

== History ==
Highway 58 was authorized in 1920.

The route was completely paved by 1940.

== Major intersections ==
The entire route is in Goodhue County.

Location	mi	km	Destinations	Notes
Zumbrota	0.000	0.000	US 52 / MN 60 / CSAH 10 – Rochester, Cannon Falls	Interchange
Red Wing	23.446	37.733	3rd Street	Former US 63 north
Red Wing	23.538	37.881	US 61 to US 63 – Lake City, Hastings	
1.000 mi = 1.609 km; 1.000 km = 0.621 mi
