= Minnesota State Highway 20 =

State highway in Minnesota, United States

Trunk Highway 20
- MN 20 highlighted in red

Route information
- Maintained by MnDOT
- Length: 7.471 mi (12.023 km)
- Existed: 1920–present

Major junctions
- South end: MN 19 at Cannon Falls
- North end: MN 50 at Douglas Township

Location
- Country: United States
- State: Minnesota
- Counties: Goodhue, Dakota

Highway system
- Minnesota Trunk Highway System; Interstate; US; State; Legislative; Scenic
← MN 19	→ MN 21

Minnesota State Highway 20 (MN 20) is a short 7.471-mile-long (12.023 km) highway in southeast Minnesota, which runs from its intersection with State Highway 19 in Cannon Falls (near U.S. 52) and continues north to its northern terminus at its intersection with State Highway 50 near Miesville, 400 feet west of U.S. 61.

Highway 20 passes through the city of Cannon Falls and Douglas Township.

== Route description ==
Highway 20 serves as a north–south route between Cannon Falls and State Highway 50 near Miesville. Its northern terminus is 400 feet west of Highway 50's junction with U.S. 61.

Highway 20 is also known as:

- 4th Street N and 5th Street N in Cannon Falls
- Cannon Falls Boulevard in southeast Dakota County

The route crosses the Cannon River in the city of Cannon Falls.

There are no signs at the Highway 19 exit from U.S. 52 at Cannon Falls that indicate the short connection via Highway 19 to Highway 20, though at the end of the offramps the connection is indicated.

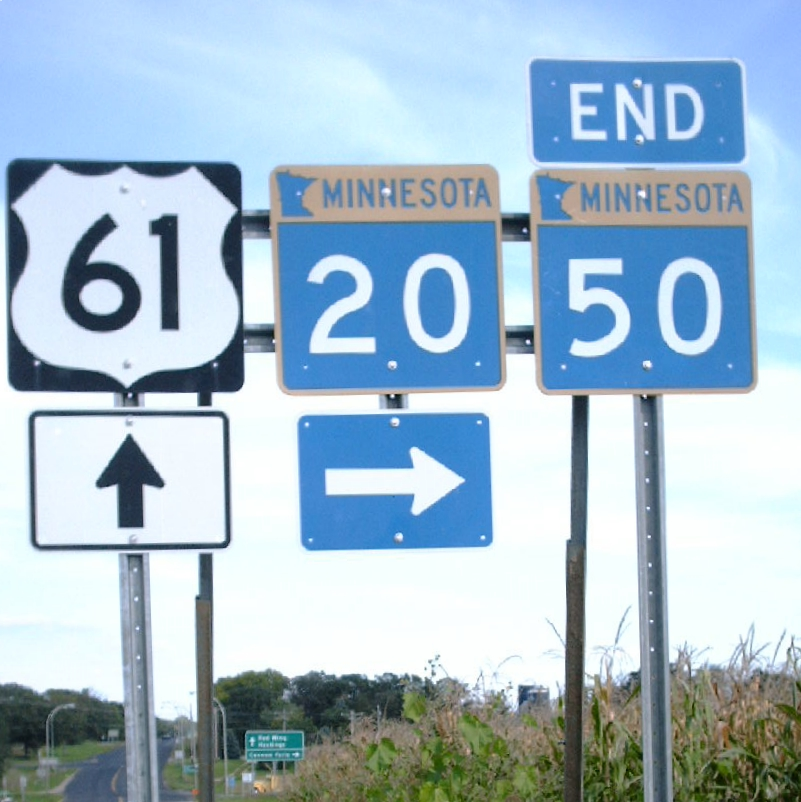
Signs at the north end of MN 20 near Miesville

== History ==
Highway 20 was designated and signed in 1920 from the Iowa border near Canton to its current northern terminus. U.S. Route 55 was established in 1927 along this road from the Iowa border to Cannon Falls. When U.S. Route 52 was extended into Minnesota in 1934 to replace U.S. 55, the Highway 20 designation was removed from this portion of the highway, leaving only the section that remains today.

The route was paved by 1940.

== Major intersections ==
County	Location	mi	km	Destinations	Notes
Goodhue	Cannon Falls	0.000	0.000	MN 19 / CSAH 20	
Goodhue	Cannon Falls	1.272	2.047	CSAH 29 to US 52	
Dakota	Douglas Township	7.488	12.051	MN 50 to US 61 – Hampton, Hastings, Red Wing	
1.000 mi = 1.609 km; 1.000 km = 0.621 mi
