= Hastings High Bridge =

Bridge in Minnesota, US

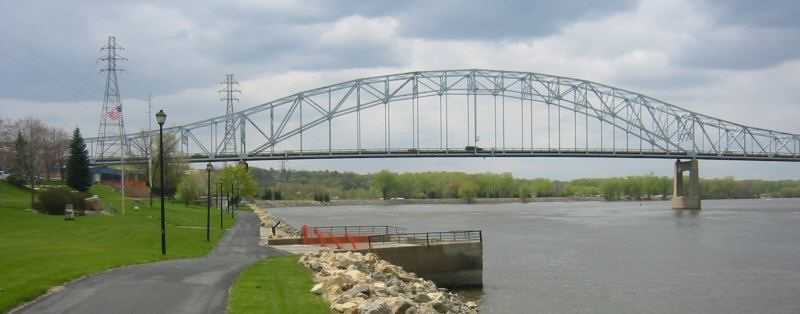
- The old Hastings High Bridge viewed from the east.
- Coordinates: 44°44′47″N 92°51′10″W
- Carries: Two lanes of US 61
- Crosses: Mississippi River
- Locale: Hastings, Minnesota, U.S.
- Maintained by: Minnesota Department of Transportation
- ID number: 5895

Characteristics
- Design: continuous arch shaped truss bridge
- Total length: 1857 feet
- Width: 32 feet
- Longest span: 502 feet
- Clearance below: 63.8 feet

History
- Opened: 1951
- Closed: June 2013

Location
- Interactive map of Hastings High Bridge

The Hastings High Bridge was a continuous steel through truss bridge that spanned the Mississippi River in Hastings, Minnesota, United States. It was designed by Sverdrup and Parcel and was built in 1951 by Graus Construction Company of Hasting for $356,000. It was demolished in late 2013 when the current Hastings Bridge opened. It had been scheduled to be torn down and replaced by the Minnesota Department of Transportation (MNDot) in 2019, but after the I-35W bridge collapse in Minneapolis, it was re-prioritized and construction started in 2010.

== Condition ==
Following the August 1, 2007 collapse of the I-35W Mississippi River bridge, the Hastings High Bridge was inspected between August 20 and August 31, 2007. An executive summary of the inspection report was released on January 15, 2008, questioning whether the bridge was capable of sustaining its 40-ton posted capacity, and calling for a load analysis to be performed immediately. Because the existing bridge was obsolete and average daily traffic exceeded 30,000 vehicles, MnDOT accelerated the new bridge project to begin in 2010. Three design-build teams submitted proposals on June 30, 2010, and the contract was awarded to the joint venture Lunda/Ames.

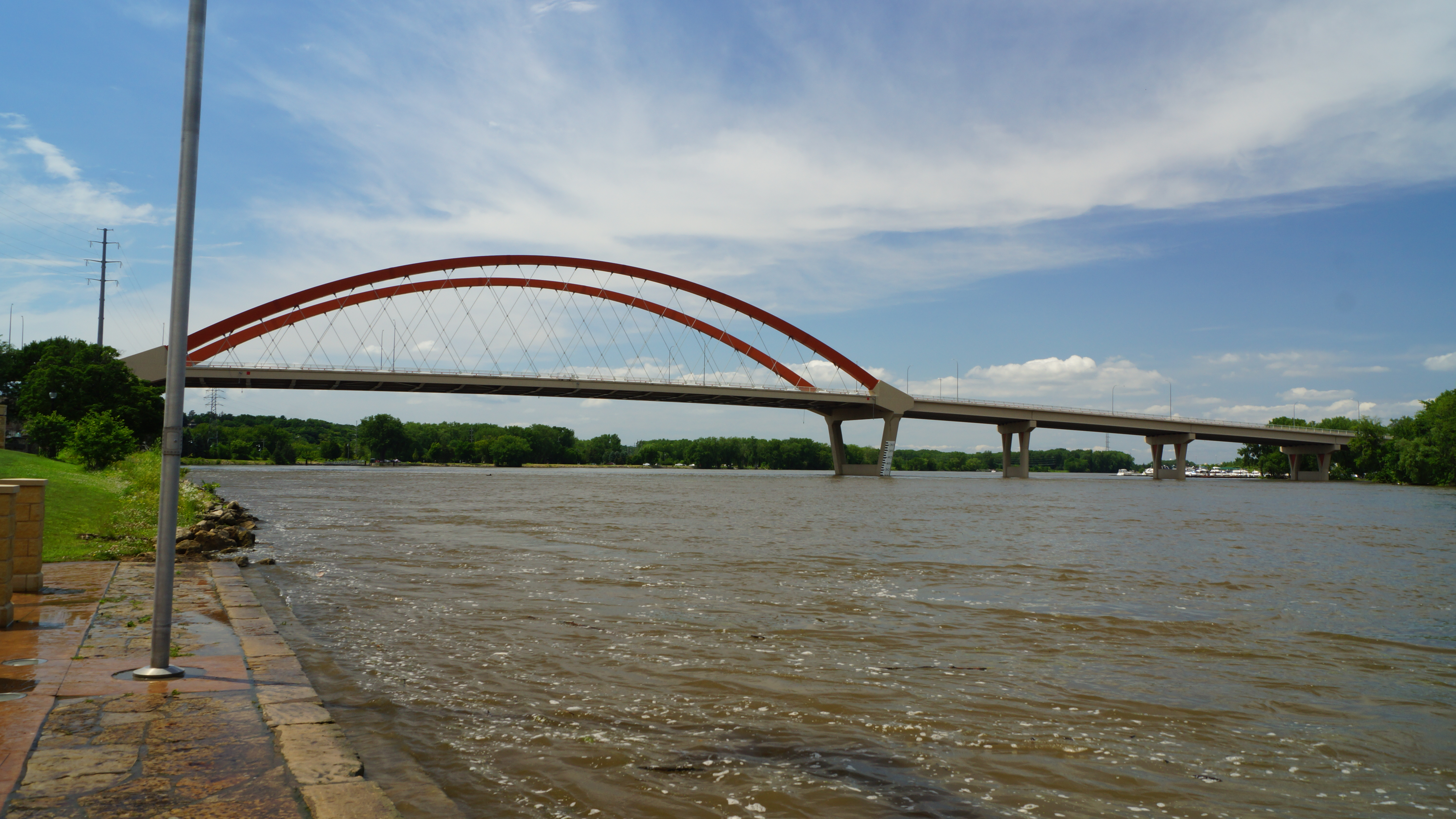
The replacement for the 1951 bridge as seen in June 2018.

In June 2013, two of the four lanes of the new bridge were open for traffic, and in November 2013 all four lanes opened. The new bridge cost $130 million and is the longest free-standing tied-arch bridge in North America, at a length of 545 feet. The main span is composed of arches, girders, beams, stringers, and roadway, offering four lanes of traffic plus twelve feet of mixed use pedestrian and bike path. The new bridge has an anti-icing system. Other features include: a public art mural on the south abutment wall, a scenic overlook incorporated near Levee Park, additional parking beneath the bridge, and lighting. The new bridge is expected to have a 100-year lifespan.

== The spiral bridge ==
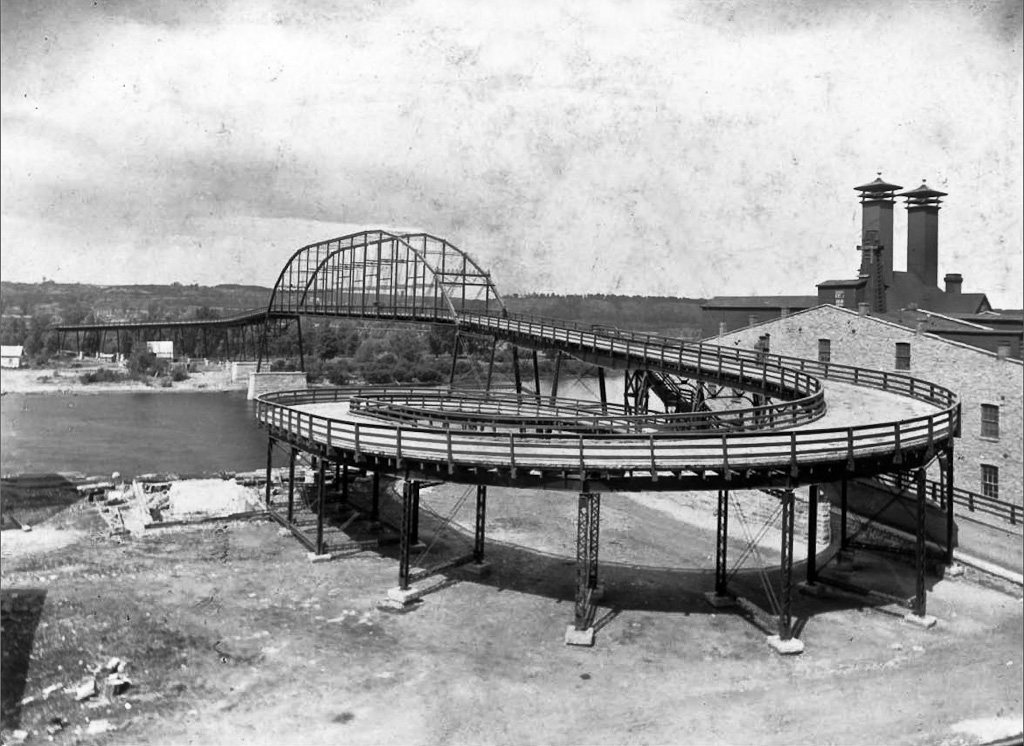
Spiral bridge circa 1895

When it was completed in 1951, the Hastings High Bridge replaced a spiral bridge that had been built in 1895. A spiral bridge was selected because local residents wanted the bridge to end in the downtown business district, rather than bypass it. Wagon drivers would get onto the bridge in downtown Hastings, make one complete circle on the spiral, and then cross the river. This bridge served the community well for many years, but towards the end of its lifespan it was rusted and could only support a 4-ton load. School buses filled with children were too heavy to make the trip, so the children had to walk across the bridge while the driver drove the empty bus across.

There is some dispute over who originally conceived the idea of a spiral ramp to the bridge. The subject was debated in local newspapers in the 1940's. Engineer Oscar Claussen, grain elevator owner John C. Meloy, legislator Lawrence H. Johnson, and local inventor B.D Caldwell were all claimed to have conceived the idea.

The main span of the bridge was 380 feet long and had a vertical clearance of 55-feet above the high-water mark of the river. The south approach, connecting Silby street to the crossing, consisted of the 385-foot long spiral ramp and a straight 120-foot set of spans. The north approach included a single 120-foot span adjacent to the main span, and then twenty-one spans of 33 feet each. The bridge was built at a cost of $39,050.

A ferry operated by William Felton carried traffic across the river from 1854 until the spiral bridge opened. After the new bridge was built, the spiral bridge was given to the city, but they could not raise the necessary funds to maintain it. The old bridge was torn down, to the dismay of local residents who felt they had lost a city symbol.

A granite monument to the spiral bridge is displayed in Hastings near location of the old bridge. A replica of the bridge has been built and can be seen at the Little Log House Pioneer Village south of Hastings.

== See also ==
- List of crossings of the Upper Mississippi River
