= Minnesota State Sanatorium for Consumptives =

- Formerly listed on the U.S. National Register of Historic Places
- U.S. Historic district
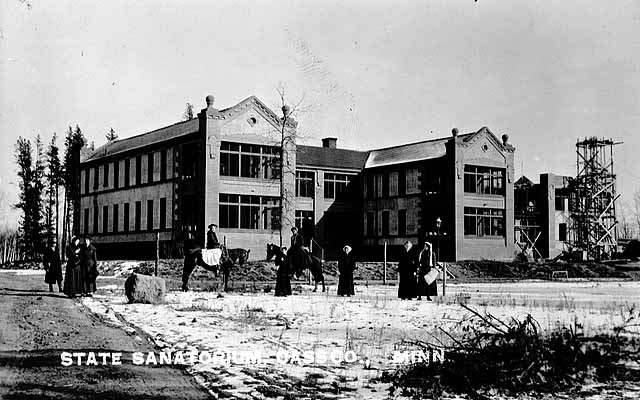
- Part of the Minnesota State Sanatorium for Consumptives under construction c. 1910

- Location within Minnesota Location within the United States
- Nearest city: Walker, Minnesota
- Coordinates: 47°4′14″N 94°34′18″W
- Area: 176.2 acres (71.3 ha)
- Built: 1906
- Architect: Clarence H. Johnston, Sr.; et al.
- Architectural style: Colonial Revival, Tudor Revival, et al.
- NRHP reference No.: 01000766

Significant dates
- Added to NRHP: July 25, 2001
- Removed from NRHP: May 28, 2019

The Minnesota State Sanatorium for Consumptives, also known as the Ah-Gwah-Ching Center, was opened in 1907 to treat tuberculosis patients. The name "Ah-Gwah-Ching" means "out-of-doors" in the Ojibwe language. The center remained a treatment center for tuberculosis until January 1, 1962. During that time, it treated nearly 14,000 patients. In 1962, it became a state nursing home known as the Ah-Gwah-Ching Nursing Home, serving geriatric patients with various mental and physical illnesses. At its peak in the 1970s, the nursing home had as many as 462 patients.

== History ==
In Minnesota more than 20,000 people died of tuberculosis between 1887 and 1899. At the time the only widely accepted treatment was fresh air and a healthy environment, which stimulated the body's immune system. The therapy did not always work but, lacking a suitable alternative, officials across the country erected sanatoria to quarantine and treat patients.

In 1906 construction began for the Minnesota State Sanatorium for Consumptives about 3 miles (4.8 km) south of the city of Walker. Overlooking Shingobee Bay on the south shore of Leech Lake, the hospital evolved into a massive complex of distinctive buildings exhibiting Colonial Revival, Tudor Revival, and Spanish Colonial Revival styles.

The sanatorium adopted new procedures as they arose. Artificial pneumothorax, for example, involved collapsing a diseased lung, which inhibited growth of tubercle bacilli. Patients survived on one lung while the damaged one healed. Then, in the 1940s, came antibiotics, which were so successful at killing the bacterium that tuberculosis was almost eradicated in the U.S. by the 1960s.

As cases plummeted, tuberculosis hospitals began closing. After serving nearly 14,000 patients, the Minnesota Sanatorium was shuttered in 1962, eventually reopening as a nursing home. The facility was added to the National Register of Historic Places in 2001, and was delisted in 2019, after the facility's demolition.

It closed in 2008, and the state divided the land, giving fifty acres to the Minnesota Department of Natural Resources for a wildlife management area, selling sixty acres to Cass County at a low price for its use, and offering the remainder for public sale. All buildings at the site, with the exception of a small gazebo, have been torn down, and the site has been made ready for future development.

By 1990, it was down to about 300 patients, and by 2003, it was down to about 150 patients. Various Minnesota governors, from Arne Carlson to Jesse Ventura, supported closing the center after 1990. The center closed in 2008. Despite a reuse study, a viable use for the complex was not found, and it was demolished in 2010. Of the 250,000 square feet (23,000 m^{2}) of buildings on the site, the only remaining structure was a small gazebo. The Cass County government acquired 60 acres (24 ha) of the property for redevelopment, and the remaining 50 acres (20 ha) was given to the Minnesota Department of Natural Resources for a wildlife management area.
