= U.S. Route 63 in Minnesota =

Segment of American highway

U.S. Highway 63
- U.S. 63 highlighted in red

Route information
- Maintained by MnDOT
- Length: 96.483 mi (155.274 km)
- Existed: 1934–present

Major junctions
- South end: US 63 at the Iowa state line near Chester, IA
- I-90 near Stewartville; US 52 in Rochester; US 14 in Rochester; US 61 in Lake City and Red Wing
- North end: US 63 at the Mississippi River in Red Wing

Location
- Country: United States
- State: Minnesota
- Counties: Fillmore, Mower, Olmsted, Wabasha, Goodhue

Highway system
- United States Numbered Highway System; List; Special; Divided; Minnesota Trunk Highway System; Interstate; US; State; Legislative; Scenic
← MN 62	→ MN 64

U.S. Route 63 (US 63) is a highway in southeastern Minnesota that runs from the Minnesota-Iowa border south of Spring Valley to the Mississippi River at Red Wing. It connects the cities of Spring Valley, Stewartville, Rochester, and Lake City.

The route in Minnesota is 96 miles (154 km) in length.

== Route description ==
U.S. 63 enters the state in Fillmore County, just north of Chester, Iowa. It travels north to Spring Valley where it becomes concurrent with State Highway 16, following it west for five miles entering Mower County. It continues north through Racine, then into Stewartville, after passing into Olmsted County, where it becomes a divided highway. Immediately after Stewartville, it intersects Interstate 90, near Rochester International Airport. The highway then enters Rochester 1 mile after the I-90 junction, where it is an expressway south of U.S. 52 (slowly becoming a freeway). It then follows U.S. 52 west of downtown Rochester to 75th Street NW, where it departs from U.S. 52. It follows 75th Street eastward to Olmsted County 33, where it continues north from a roundabout.

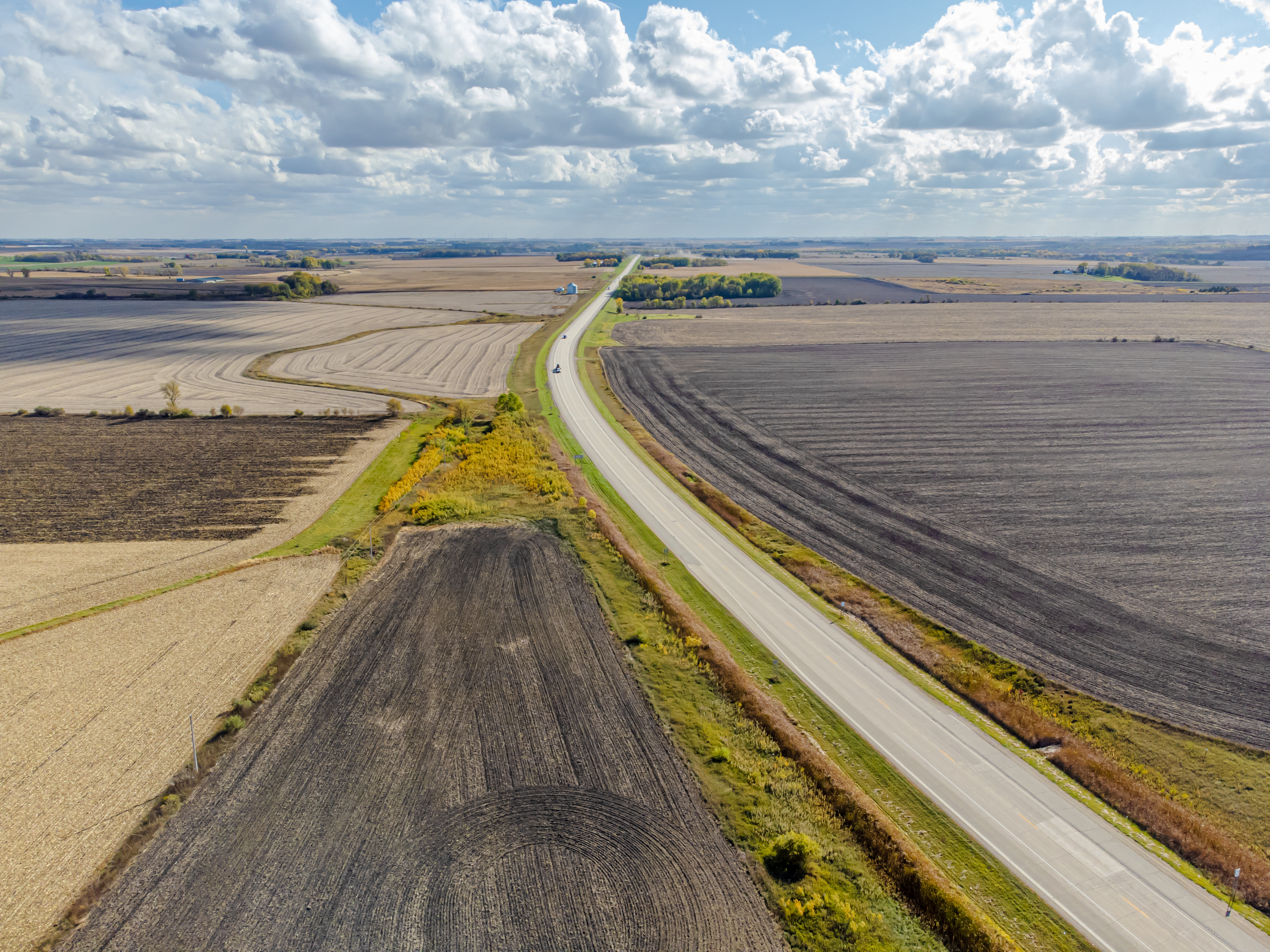
US-63 in southern Minnesota

It continues north through Olmsted and Wabasha counties. A short segment of the highway is built to four-lane expressway standards just north of Zumbro Falls. It meets U.S. Highway 61 at Lake City and overlaps it into the city of Red Wing. U.S. 63 turns off from U.S. 61 and then curves back northwest to cross over 61, and then reaches the Red Wing Bridge where it crosses the Mississippi River and enters the state of Wisconsin.

Nearly all of the route is legally defined as Constitutional Route 59 in the Minnesota Statutes, except for the part between Red Wing and the Mississippi River, which is Legislative Route 161.

== History ==
U.S. 63 was extended into Minnesota in 1934. The route had previously been marked the year before as U.S. 59, except for the segment running from U.S. 61 to the river crossing, which had been State Highway 58. U.S. 63 was an original 1926 U.S. Route and terminated in Des Moines, Iowa until it was extended north. The U.S. 59 designation was simultaneously reassigned to a new highway running from Laredo, Texas to Pembina, North Dakota. The 32-mile (51 km) leg north of Rochester was originally blazed as the Lake City and Rochester Stage Road in 1858.

The route was paved when it was marked.

In the spring of 2014, it was rerouted to follow U.S. Highway 52 west of downtown Rochester. This makes the route longer, but reduces transit time due to higher speed limits and fewer traffic lights. The segment of the old route 63 between 37th Street NE and 75th Street NE was turned over to Olmsted County, and renamed County route 33. Plans for the change were announced in April, 2012.

== Major intersections ==
County	Location	mi	km	Destinations	Notes
Fillmore	Beaver Township	0.000	0.000	US 63 south – New Hampton, Waterloo	Continuation into Iowa
Fillmore	Beaver Township	0.503	0.810	MN 56 north (Shooting Star Scenic Byway) – Le Roy	
Fillmore	Beaver Township	2.965	4.772	CSAH 26 / CSAH 44 – Harmony	Formerly MN 44
Fillmore	Spring Valley	13.569	21.837	MN 16 east (Historic Bluff Country Scenic Byway / Laura Ingalls Wilder Historic Highway) / CSAH 1 – Preston	Eastern end of MN 16 overlap; CSAH 1 formerly MN 74
Mower	Frankford Township	18.649	30.013	MN 16 west (Historic Bluff Country Scenic Byway) – Grand Meadow, Dexter	Western end of MN 16 overlap
Olmsted	Stewartville	28.756	46.278	MN 30 east – Chatfield	Southern end of MN 30 overlap
Olmsted	High Forest Township	30.794	49.558	I-90 – Albert Lea, La Crosse	I-90 exits 209A-B; interchange.
Olmsted	Rochester	33.076	53.231	MN 30 west / CSAH 16	Northern end of MN 30 overlap; interchange; access to Rochester International Airport
Olmsted	Rochester	35.727	57.497	48th Street South	Interchange
Olmsted	Rochester	36.512	58.760	40th Street South	Interchange
Olmsted	Rochester	37.405	60.198	US 52 south to I-90 east – Preston	Interchange; southern end of US 52 overlap
Olmsted	Rochester	39.571	63.683	CR 25 (16th Street SW)	
Olmsted	Rochester	39.981	64.343	US 14 east (12th Street SW) – Winona	No access northbound, southern end of US 14 overlap
Olmsted	Rochester	40.755	65.589	6th Street SW	No southbound access
Olmsted	Rochester	41.065	66.088	2nd Street SW	Access to Mayo Clinic, Saint Marys Hospital
Olmsted	Rochester	41.692	67.097	US 14 west (Laura Ingalls Wilder Historic Highway) / Civic Center Drive NW – Owatonna	Partial cloverleaf, northern end of US 14 overlap
Olmsted	Rochester	42.570	68.510	19th Street NW, Elton Hills Drive NW	Single point urban interchange
Olmsted	Rochester	43.924	70.689	CR 22 east (37th Street NW/41st Street NW)	
Olmsted	Rochester	45.273	72.860	55th Street NW	
Olmsted	Rochester	46.282	74.484	65th Street NW	
Olmsted	Rochester	47.285	76.098	US 52 north / 75th Street NW – St. Paul	Northern end of US 52 overlap
Olmsted	Farmington Township	55.709	89.655	MN 247 east – Plainview	
Wabasha	Zumbro Falls	64.343	103.550	MN 60 – Zumbrota, Wabasha	
Wabasha	Lake City	79.180	127.428	US 61 south (Lake Shore Drive / Laura Ingalls Wilder Historic Highway) – Wabasha, Winona	Southern end of US 61 overlap
Goodhue	Red Wing	95.987	154.476	US 61 north (Main Street) / MN 58 ends (Plum Street) – Hastings	Northern end of US 61 overlap; northern end of MN 58
Goodhue	Red Wing	96.059	154.592	MN 58 south (Plum Street) – Zumbrota	Southern end of MN 58 overlap
Mississippi River		96.483	155.274	Red Wing Bridge (Minnesota–Wisconsin state line)	
Pierce	Hager City			US 63 north – Ellsworth	Continuation into Wisconsin
1.000 mi = 1.609 km; 1.000 km = 0.621 mi: Concurrency terminus; Incomplete access

== Future ==
The Minnesota Department of Transportation also has plans to turn Highway 63 into a controlled-access freeway between U.S. 52 and Interstate 90.

U.S. Route 63
Previous state: Iowa	Minnesota	Next state: Wisconsin
