= Minnesota State Highway 60 =

State highway in Minnesota, United States

Trunk Highway 60
- MN 60 highlighted in red

Route information
- Maintained by MnDOT
- Length: 221.532 mi (356.521 km)
- Existed: 1934–present

Major junctions
- West end: Iowa 60 near Bigelow
- US 59 at Worthington; I-90 at Worthington; US 71 at Windom; US 169 between Mankato and North Mankato; US 14 between North Mankato and Eagle Lake; I-35 at Faribault; US 52 at Zumbrota; US 63 at Zumbro Falls; US 61 at Wabasha
- East end: WIS 25 near Nelson, WI

Location
- Country: United States
- State: Minnesota
- Counties: Nobles, Jackson, Cottonwood, Watonwan, Blue Earth, Nicollet, Le Sueur, Waseca, Rice, Goodhue, Wabasha

Highway system
- Minnesota Trunk Highway System; Interstate; US; State; Legislative; Scenic
← US 59	→ US 61

Trunk Highway 60 (MN 60) is a 221.532-mile-long (356.521 km) highway in southern Minnesota, which runs from Iowa Highway 60 at the Iowa state line (at Bigelow) and continues east-northeast to its eastern terminus at the Wisconsin state line (at Wabasha), where the route becomes Wisconsin Highway 25 upon crossing the Mississippi River.

Highway 60 is the only state highway in Minnesota which runs from one border to another. The route runs in a general southwest-to-northeast direction.

Its western half forms a large portion of the four-lane expressway connecting Sioux City and the Twin Cities.

== Route description ==
State Highway 60 serves as an east–west marked route in southern Minnesota between Worthington, Windom, St. James, Mankato, Faribault, Zumbrota, and Wabasha.

Highway 60 runs concurrently with U.S. Highway 59 south of and into Worthington; with U.S. Highway 71 in Windom; with State Highway 4 and State Highway 30 near St. James; with State Highway 15 near Madelia; and with U.S. Highway 169 in the Mankato area.

In North Mankato, Highway 60 moves from a concurrency with U.S. 169 to another one with U.S. Highway 14, continuing east on a four lane expressway until just past Eagle Lake, where the route leaves U.S. 14 and continues briefly north to Madison Lake then northeast towards the city of Faribault. Highway 60 is a two lane highway at this point and for most of the rest of its way to Faribault and Wabasha. The route has a junction with Interstate 35 in Faribault.

From Faribault, Highway 60 continues east towards Zumbrota, where it intersects U.S. Highway 52. The route briefly runs concurrently with U.S. 52 around Zumbrota on a four lane expressway. Highway 60 then leaves U.S. 52 and continues east-northeast towards Wabasha. The route has junction with U.S. Highway 63 in Zumbro Falls and a junction with U.S. Highway 61 in Wabasha. Highway 60 crosses the Mississippi River at Wabasha on the Wabasha-Nelson Bridge. The route becomes Wisconsin Highway 25 upon crossing the river into Wisconsin.

== History ==
State Highway 60 was formed in 1934 by connecting three Minnesota constitutional route segments together. This formed a nearly border-to-border state highway, with its original termini at current U.S. 59 in Worthington and U.S. 61 at Wabasha. The route was extended to the Iowa state line in 1937, and was authorized onto the bridge to Wisconsin in 1943. The last gravel segment on this route was paved by 1960. Expressway segments were completed from St. James to Lake Crystal in 1980, from Worthington to Windom in 2003, from Bigelow to Worthington in 2013, from Butterfield to St. James in 2014, and from Mountain Lake to Butterfield in 2015. The final four-lane expansion from Windom to Mountain Lake was completed in 2018.

== Major intersections ==
County	Location	mi	km	Destinations	Notes
Nobles	Bigelow Township	0.000	0.000	Iowa 60 south / CSAH 2 west – Sioux City	Continuation into Iowa
Nobles	Bigelow Township	4.659	7.498	US 59 south – Cherokee	Western end of US 59 concurrency
Nobles	Worthington	10.707	17.231	CSAH 35 (Kragness Avenue)	Formerly US 16 east
Nobles	Worthington	11.249	18.104	US 59 north (Oxford Street west) / CSAH 33 east / I-90 BL west	Eastern end of US 59 concurrency; western end of I-90 BL concurrency; formerly US 16 west
Nobles	Worthington	12.097– 12.120	19.468– 19.505	I-90 – Albert Lea, Sioux Falls	Interchange; I-90 exit 45; eastern end of I-90 BL
Jackson	Delafield Township	36.290	58.403	MN 86 south (450th Avenue) – Lakefield	
Cottonwood	Windom	40.022	64.409	US 71 south – Jackson	Western end of US 71 concurrency
Cottonwood	Windom	40.554	65.265	MN 62 west (6th Street) – Fulda	
Cottonwood	Windom	41.505	66.796	US 71 north	Eastern end of US 71 concurrency
Watonwan	St. James Township	65.594	105.563	MN 4 south / CSAH 57 / Bus. MN 60 east – St. James, Sherburn	Western end of MN 4 concurrency; western end of expressway section
Watonwan	St. James	68.105	109.604	MN 4 north / MN 30 west / Bus. MN 60 west – St. James	Eastern end of MN 4 concurrency, western end of MN 30 concurrency
Watonwan	Rosendale Township	69.844	112.403	CSAH 12 – St. James	Eastern end of expressway section
Watonwan	Fieldon Township	77.789	125.189	MN 15 south / MN 30 east – Fairmont	Eastern end of MN 30 concurrency, western end of MN 15 concurrency; interchange
Watonwan	Madelia	81.780– 81.826	131.612– 131.686	CSAH 9 – Madelia	Western end of expressway section
Watonwan	Madelia	83.043	133.645	CSAH 3 west – Madelia	
Watonwan	Madelia	83.468	134.329	MN 15 – New Ulm	Eastern end of MN 15 concurrency; eastern end of expressway section
Blue Earth	Lake Crystal	93.667	150.742	CSAH 20 south / CSAH 6 – Industrial park	Partial interchange; westbound exit and entrance; eastbound access via 510th Avenue
Blue Earth	South Bend Township	99.183	159.620	US 169 south – Blue Earth	Western end of US 169 concurrency
Blue Earth	South Bend Township	100.863– 100.921	162.323– 162.417	CSAH 90 east	Partial interchange; entrances and eastbound exit; westbound exit via at-grade left turn
Blue Earth	South Bend Township	102.095	164.306	MN 68 west / Minnesota River Valley Scenic Byway – New Ulm, Campground	
Blue Earth	Mankato	103.494	166.557	Frontage Road	Eastbound exit and westbound entrance; western end of expressway section
Blue Earth	Mankato	104.378	167.980	Riverfront Drive	Former MN 66
Nicollet	North Mankato	104.356	167.945	Lookout Drive, Center Street	Center Street not signed westbound
Nicollet	North Mankato	105.005	168.989	North Mankato, Mankato, Downtown	Eastern end of expressway section
Nicollet	North Mankato–Mankato line	107.096	172.354	US 14 west / US 169 north – New Ulm, Minneapolis	Eastern end of US 169 concurrency, western end of US 14 concurrency; interchange; western end of freeway section
Blue Earth	Mankato	108.228	174.176	CSAH 5 (3rd Avenue) / Minnesota River Valley Scenic Byway	
Blue Earth	Mankato	108.836	175.155	Riverfront Drive	
Blue Earth	Mankato	109.881– 109.913	176.836– 176.888	CSAH 3 (Victory Drive)	
Blue Earth	Mankato	110.846	178.389	MN 22 – Mankato	
Blue Earth	Mankato	113.713	183.003	CSAH 12	Eastern end of freeway section
Blue Earth	Le Ray Township	117.454	189.024	US 14 east – Waseca	Eastern end of US 14 concurrency
Waseca	No major junctions				
Le Sueur	Waterville	134.590	216.602	MN 13 – New Prague, Waseca	
Rice	Warsaw Township	145.834	234.697	CSAH 17 / I-35 Alt. south – Cannon Lake	Western end of Alt. I-35 concurrency
Rice	Faribault	148.856	239.561	I-35 – Minneapolis, Saint Paul, Albert Lea	I-35 exit 56
Rice	Faribault	149.828	241.125	MN 21 north (Lyndale Avenue) / I-35 BL / CSAH 48 / I-35 Alt. north – Saint Paul, Owatonna	Eastern end of Alt. I-35 concurrency
Rice	Faribault	148.965	239.736	Central Avenue	Formerly MN 3; previously US 65 / MN 218
Rice	Faribault	151.659	244.072	MN 299 north (6th Avenue NE) / MN 298 south (6th Avenue SE) – Minnesota State Academy for the Deaf, Minnesota State Academy for the Blind	
Goodhue	Kenyon	165.464	266.288	MN 56 south / CSAH 12 – Dodge Center	Western end of MN 56 concurrency
Goodhue	Kenyon	166.018	267.180	MN 56 north – Hampton	Eastern end of MN 56 concurrency
Goodhue	Wanamingo	175.922	283.119	MN 57 – Wanamingo, Mantorville	
Goodhue	Zumbrota	181.266	291.719	US 52 north – Cannon Falls	Western end of US 52 concurrency; interchange; western end of freeway section
Goodhue	Zumbrota	182.655	293.955	MN 58 north / CSAH 10 – Zumbrota, Red Wing	
Goodhue	Zumbrota	183.703	295.641	US 52 south – Rochester	Eastern end of US 52 concurrency; interchange; eastern end of freeway section
Wabasha	Zumbro Falls	196.051	315.514	US 63 – Lake City, Rochester	
Wabasha	Wabasha	220.051	354.138	US 61 / Great River Road – Lake City, Winona	
Mississippi River		221.532	356.521	Michael Duane Clickner Memorial Bridge	
Mississippi River				WIS 25 north – Nelson	Continuation into Wisconsin
1.000 mi = 1.609 km; 1.000 km = 0.621 mi: Concurrency terminus; Incomplete access
