= Treasure Island Resort & Casino =

Native American casino in Red Wing, Minnesota

- Interactive map of Treasure Island Resort & Casino
- Location: 5734 Sturgeon Lake Road Welch, Minnesota 55089; 44.63215°N 92.64992°W
- Opened: 1984; 42 years ago
- Theme: Tropical
- No. of rooms: 788 (2nd-largest hotel in Minnesota)
- Gaming space: 200,000 Square Feet
- Signature attractions: Treasure Island Amphitheater (16,000 capacity), Island Event Center (2,800 capacity), The Lagoon (indoor waterpark), Wave Spa, Spirit of the Water, Marina, RV Park, Island Xtreme Bowl, Cyber Quest arcade
- Notable restaurants: Tado Steakhouse, Currents Restaurant
- Casino type: Privately Held
- Renovated in: 1989, 1991, 1992, 1993, 1996, 2015
- Website: www.ticasino.com

Treasure Island Resort & Casino is a tribal casino hotel owned and operated by the Prairie Island Indian Community (PIIC) in Red Wing, Minnesota. It is the only casino resort in southern Minnesota located on the Mississippi River. The casino’s gaming options include slot machines; video roulette, blackjack and keno; live dealer blackjack, poker and other table games; and bingo. Additional amenities to the property include a 788-room hotel (2nd-largest in Minnesota), the Treasure Island Amphitheater (outdoors - 16,000 capacity), the Island Event Center (indoors - 2,800 capacity), a marina, RV-park, a cruise yacht, an indoor waterpark, a spa, a 24-lane bowling center and arcade, and several restaurants. Employing nearly 1,500 people, Treasure Island Resort & Casino is the largest employer in Goodhue County.

== History ==
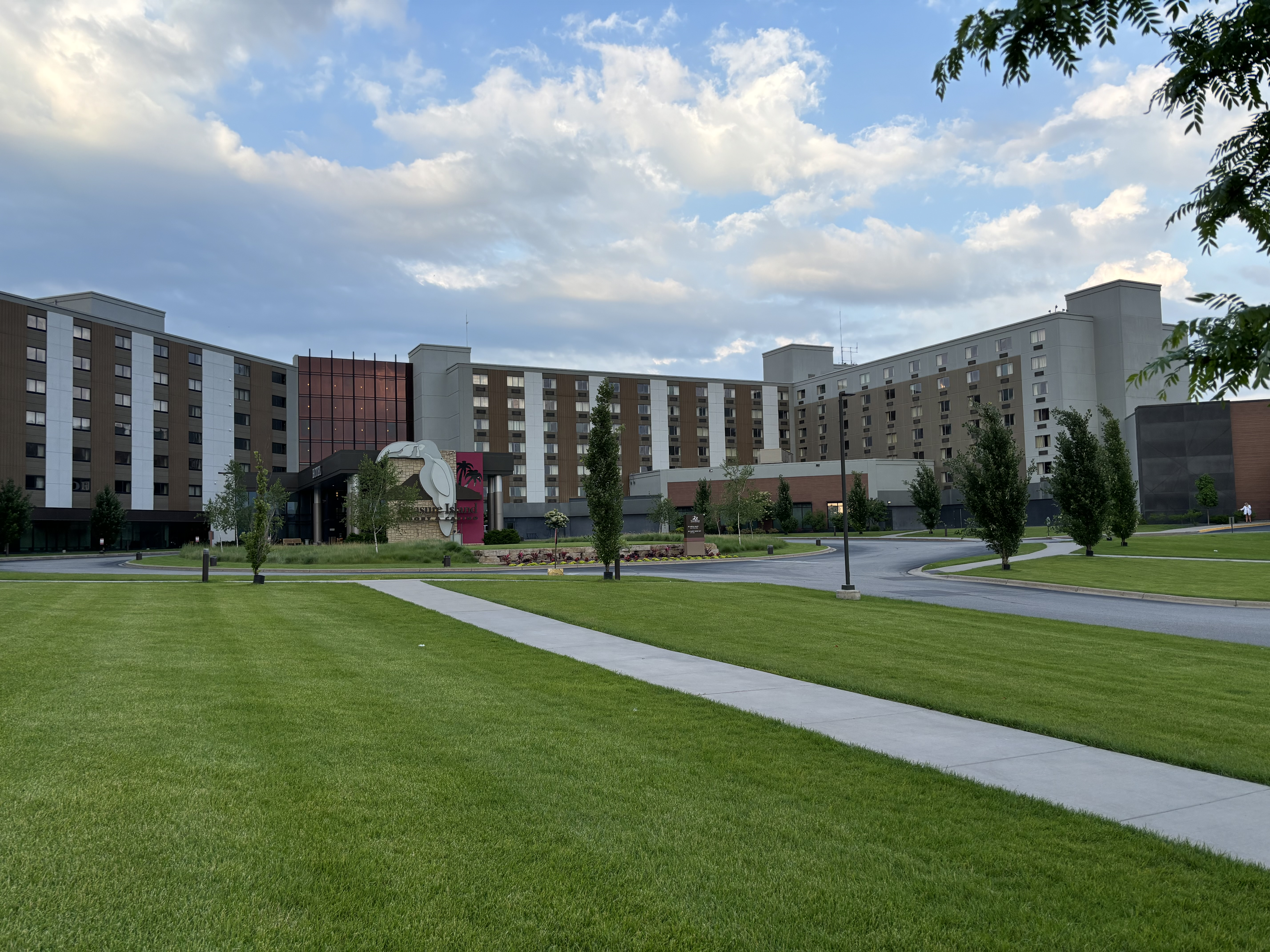
Treasure Island Resort & Casino

Treasure Island Resort & Casino began as a bingo hall in 1984 called Island Bingo. This building started as a 30,000-square-foot space that seated 1,400 people.

Through its time of success, it began to grow further after Congress passed the Indian Gaming Regulatory Act of 1988. This act required states to negotiate gaming compacts with tribes as a way to strengthen tribal governments and improve the quality of life on reservations. This act contributed to much tribal success for the Prairie Island Indian Community. Shortly after 1989, Prairie Island Indian Community signed a compact with the State of Minnesota which allowed it to expand its gaming operation.

In 1991, the 30,000-square-foot building was expanded with a 25,000-square-foot addition that created room for additional games. Not long after, in 1992, the casino was expanded by an additional 25,000 square feet. Growth in the Prairie Island Indian Community was shown with the opening of a community center and a health care facility, as well as improvement to tribal water and sewer systems. In 1993, a 78,000-square-foot expansion was added which created three new restaurants, valet parking, state-of-the-art kitchen, a gift shop, players club, ballroom and a new entertainment area. In the following year, a 137-slip marina and 95-site RV park opened. Growth continued as 9,854 square-foot addition for business offices was established in 1995. In 1996, Treasure Island made a big step with a $20 million addition and redesign.

A strategic marketing shift changed the name to Treasure Island Resort & Casino, with the addition of new theming and a 250-room hotel which transformed Treasure Island into a destination resort. The total square footage was 350,000 with 25,000 square feet designed for meeting space. In 2001, an additional 200,000 feet were added to the casino, which included a new great entry, higher ceilings to improve air quality, additional games, 70,000-square-foot office space and 60,000-square-foot warehouse.

An expansion that was completed in fall 2008 included 230 new hotel rooms, 30,000-square-foot event center and a bowling center complete with an arcade area. In 2015, Tado Steakhouse was constructed, and the Tradewinds Buffet was remodeled and the water park & spa construction began. The Lagoon and Wave Spa opened February 9, 2016.

== Prairie Island Indian Community ==
In 1936, the Prairie Island Indian Community was recognized by the federal government and had established acreage as the reservation. Prairie Island Indian Community has grown into a successful and flourishing tribe with tremendous help from Treasure Island Resort & Casino. Because of the Regulatory Act of 1988, they have established Treasure Island Resort & Casino and through this have established several services. The services on Prairie Island that didn’t exist prior to gaming include educational programs and scholarships, social services, financial planning services, improved water and sewer systems, water treatment facility, health care facility, community center, tribal government center, tribal courtroom, tribal police chief and exercise facilities. Tribal gaming is now among the top 14 employers in Minnesota. In Goodhue County, gaming has helped create more than 1,600 new tax-paying jobs and is credited with dramatically reducing the number of residents on welfare by 67%. As the largest employer in Goodhue County, Prairie Island provides for nearly $14 million in state and federal taxes annually. Prairie Island Indian Community also owns Dakota Station (gas station and convenience store) and Mount Frontenac (golf course). Since 1994, the community has donated nearly $17.5 million to many Indian and non-Indian causes. Organizations that have benefited since gaming was established on Prairie Island include: March of Dimes, Spare Key, American Diabetes, Muscular Dystrophy Association, Special Olympics, veterans organizations, Toys for Tots, Salvation Army, area hospitals and schools, United Way, environmental and wildlife preservation groups and many others.

== See also ==
- List of integrated resorts
