= Douglas Township, Minnesota =

Township in Minnesota, United States

Douglas Township
- Township
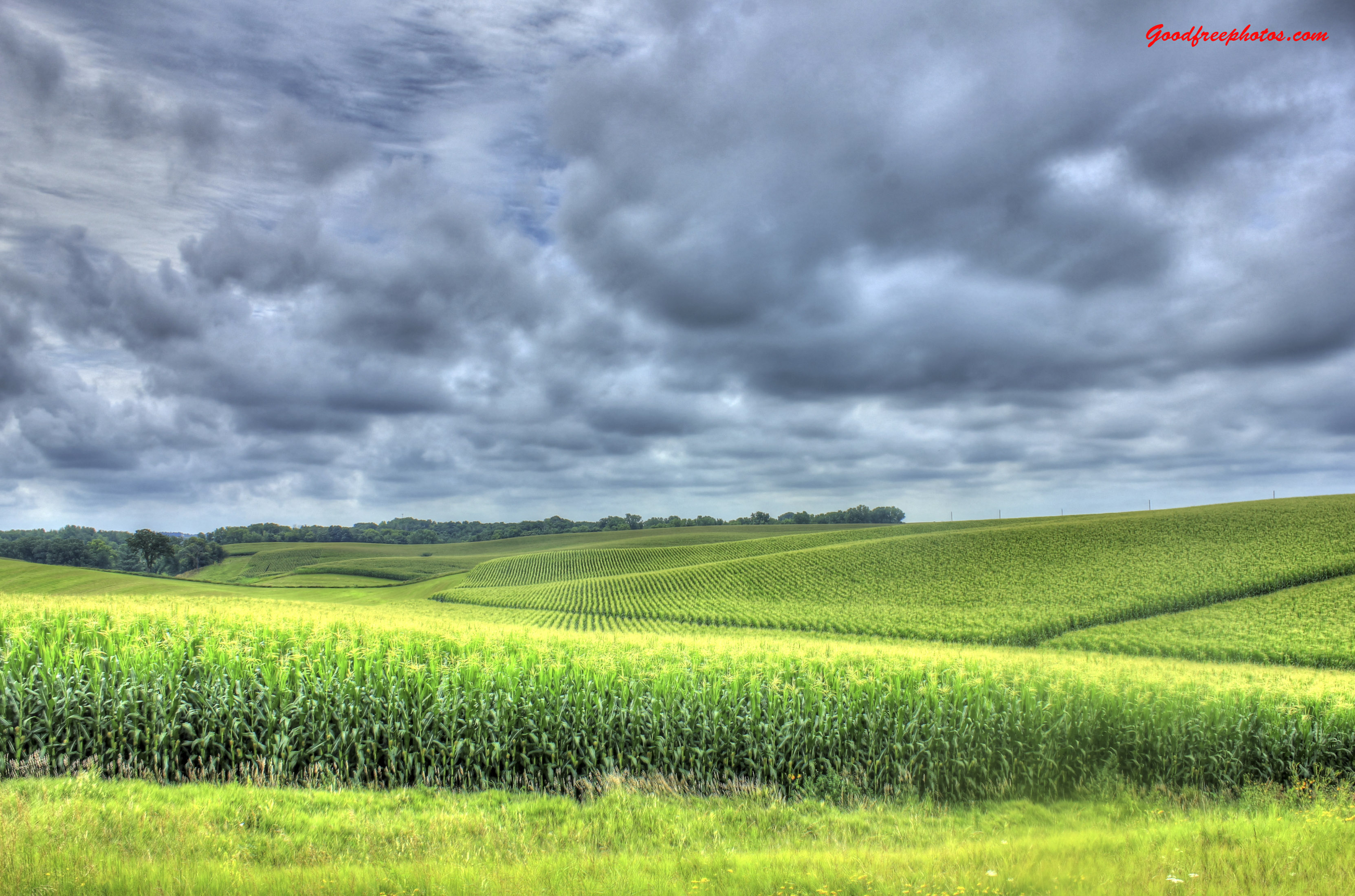

- Location within the state of Minnesota Douglas Township (the United States)
- Coordinates: 44°35′28″N 92°50′52″W
- Country: United States
- State: Minnesota
- County: Dakota

Area
  - Total: 33.9 sq mi (87.8 km^{2})
  - Land: 33.9 sq mi (87.8 km^{2})
  - Water: 0 sq mi (0.0 km^{2})
- Elevation: 945 ft (288 m)

Population (2020)
  - Total: 748
  - Density: 22/sq mi (8.5/km^{2})
- Time zone: UTC-6 (Central (CST))
  - Summer (DST): UTC-5 (CDT)
- Area codes: 651 and 507
- FIPS code: 27-16228
- GNIS feature ID: 0663994
- Website: https://douglastownshipmn.com/

Douglas Township is a township in Dakota County, Minnesota, United States. The population was 748 at the 2020 census. Douglas Township was organized in 1858, and named for Stephen A. Douglas, a United States Senator from Illinois. Its town hall is located at the intersection of U.S. Route 61 and state highways 20 and 50.

== History ==
On April 6, 1858, the Dakota County board of commissioners made township 117, range 17 Douglas Township. Hugh McKay made the first claim to land within the township in the spring of 1854. The first elections were held on May 11, 1858. The elected officials included: Harvey Van Auken, John Borrill and John McLaughlin as judges of election; Hugh Larimer, clerk of court; Harvey Van Autken, Daniel W. Twichell and John Borrill, as supervisors; A. J. Patch, clerk: Hugh Larimer, as assessor; James Keetley, as collector; Richard Powers as constable; Harvey Van Auken as justice of the peace; John Holmes as overseer of highways.

== Geography ==
According to the United States Census Bureau, the township has a total area of 33.9 square miles (88 km^{2}), all land. There are no lakes in the township. There is one small stream, Trout Brook, which flows into the Cannon River that touches the southeastern corner of the township. The town of Miesville, established in 1874, is a town completely within Douglas Township. The township is divided into 36 sections.

== Demographics ==
Historical population
Census	Pop.	Note	%±
1860	120		—
1870	707		489.2%
1880	801		13.3%
1890	666		−16.9%
1900	601		−9.8%
1910	616		2.5%
1920	581		−5.7%
1930	599		3.1%
1940	603		0.7%
1950	586		−2.8%
1960	537		−8.4%
1970	552		2.8%
1980	614		11.2%
1990	670		9.1%
2000	760		13.4%
2010	716		−5.8%
2020	748		4.5%
U.S. Decennial Census

As of the census of 2000, there were 760 people, 235 households, and 195 families residing in the township. The population density was 22.4 inhabitants per square mile (8.6/km^{2}). There were 237 housing units at an average density of 7.0 per square mile (2.7/km^{2}). The racial makeup of the township was 96.97% White, 0.13% African American, 1.05% Native American, 0.53% Asian, and 1.32% from two or more races. Hispanic or Latino of any race were 0.79% of the population.

There were 235 households, out of which 48.1% had children under the age of 18 living with them, 76.6% were married couples living together, 4.3% had a female householder with no husband present, and 16.6% were non-families. 11.1% of all households were made up of individuals, and 4.3% had someone living alone who was 65 years of age or older. The average household size was 3.23 and the average family size was 3.56.

In the township the population was spread out, with 33.8% under the age of 18, 7.2% from 18 to 24, 28.9% from 25 to 44, 21.4% from 45 to 64, and 8.6% who were 65 years of age or older. The median age was 35 years. For every 100 females, there were 106.0 males. For every 100 females age 18 and over, there were 103.6 males.

The median income for a household in the township was $60,536, and the median income for a family was $68,068. Males had a median income of $41,389 versus $29,375 for females. The per capita income for the township was $22,319. About 3.6% of families and 3.7% of the population were below the poverty line, including 2.8% of those under age 18 and 10.4% of those age 65 or over.
