= Great River Road =

Scenic roadway from Louisiana to Minnesota, U.S.

Great River Road

Route information
- Length: 2,069 mi (3,330 km)
- History: Formerly extended north into Ontario and Manitoba in Canada.

Major junctions
- North end: Lake Itasca, Minnesota
- South end: Venice, Louisiana

Location
- Country: United States
- States: Minnesota, Wisconsin, Iowa, Illinois, Missouri, Kentucky, Tennessee, Arkansas, Mississippi, Louisiana

Highway system
- Scenic Byways; National; National Forest; BLM; NPS

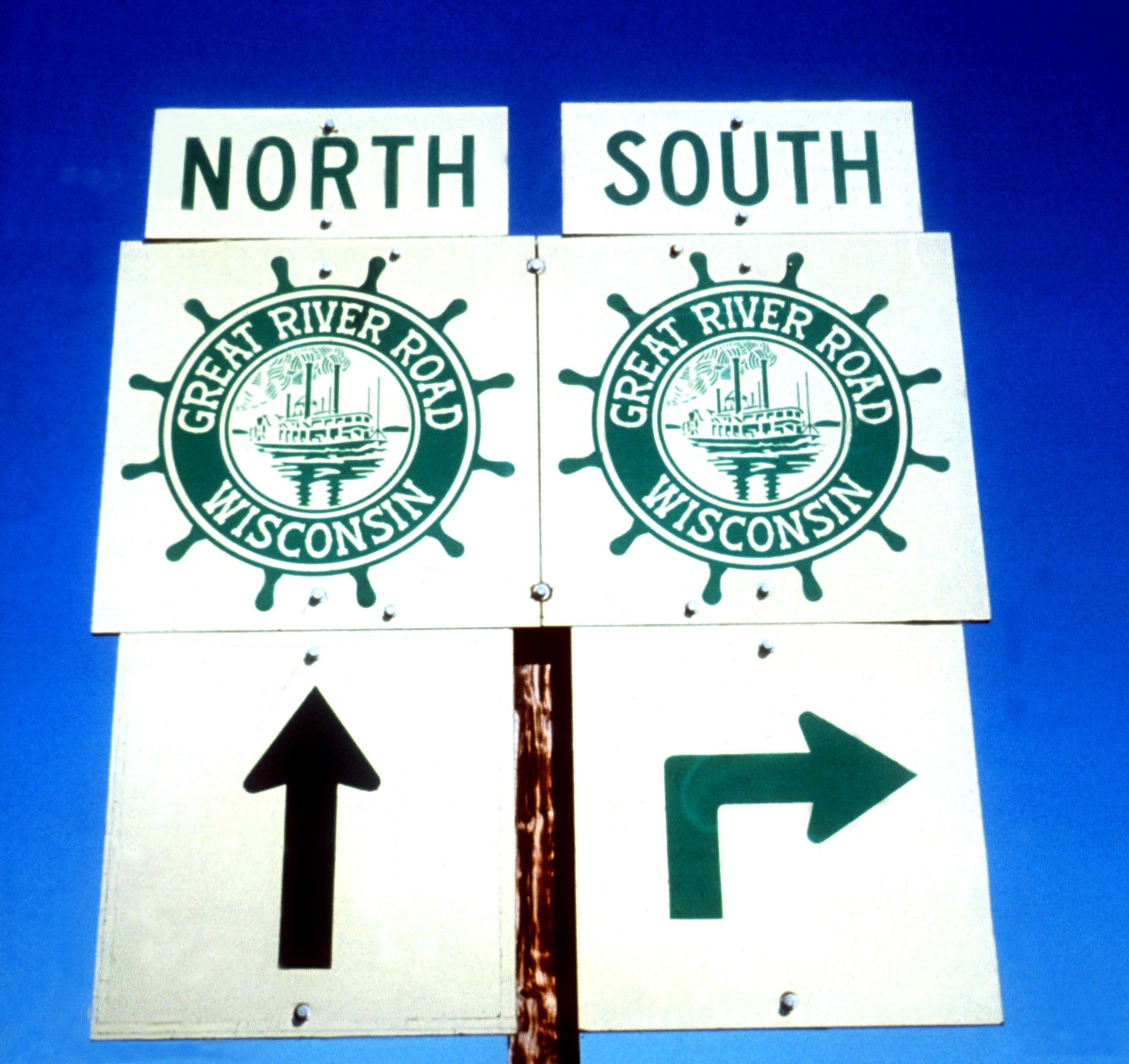
The distinctive route marker displayed along the entire 10-state routing of the Great River Road

The Great River Road is a collection of state and local roads that follow the course of the Mississippi River. It begins at Lake Itasca, Minnesota, and passes through Wisconsin, Iowa, Illinois, Missouri, Kentucky, Tennessee, Arkansas, and Mississippi, before terminating in Venice, Louisiana. It formerly extended north into Canada, serving the provinces of Ontario and Manitoba. The road is designated as both a National Scenic Byway and an All-American Road in several states along the route.

The term "Great River Road" refers both to a series of roadways and to a larger region inside the US and in each state, used for tourism and historic purposes. Some states have designated or identified regions of state interest along the road and use the roads to encompass those regions.

It is divided into two main sections: the Great River Road and the National Scenic Byway Route. The eponymous segment runs on both sides of the river from Louisiana through the state borders of Kentucky/Illinois and Missouri/Iowa, excepting the full length of the road in Arkansas. A five-state section of the road has been designated a National Scenic Byway, running through Arkansas, Illinois, Iowa, Wisconsin, and Minnesota. In 2021, eight of the 10 state routes were designated All-American Roads by the Federal Highway Administration, highlighting their national significance and one-of-a-kind features.

Developed in 1938, the road took 30 years of planning until it was built. It has a separate commission in each state. These in turn cooperate through the Mississippi River Parkway Commission (MRPC). The 2,340 miles (3,765 km) are designated with a green-and-white sign showing a river steamboat inside a pilotwheel with the name of the state or province. The over-all logo reads "Canada to Gulf" where the local name would be, and most MRPC publications denote the route as beginning at Lake Itasca in Minnesota and ending in Louisiana.

== Route description ==
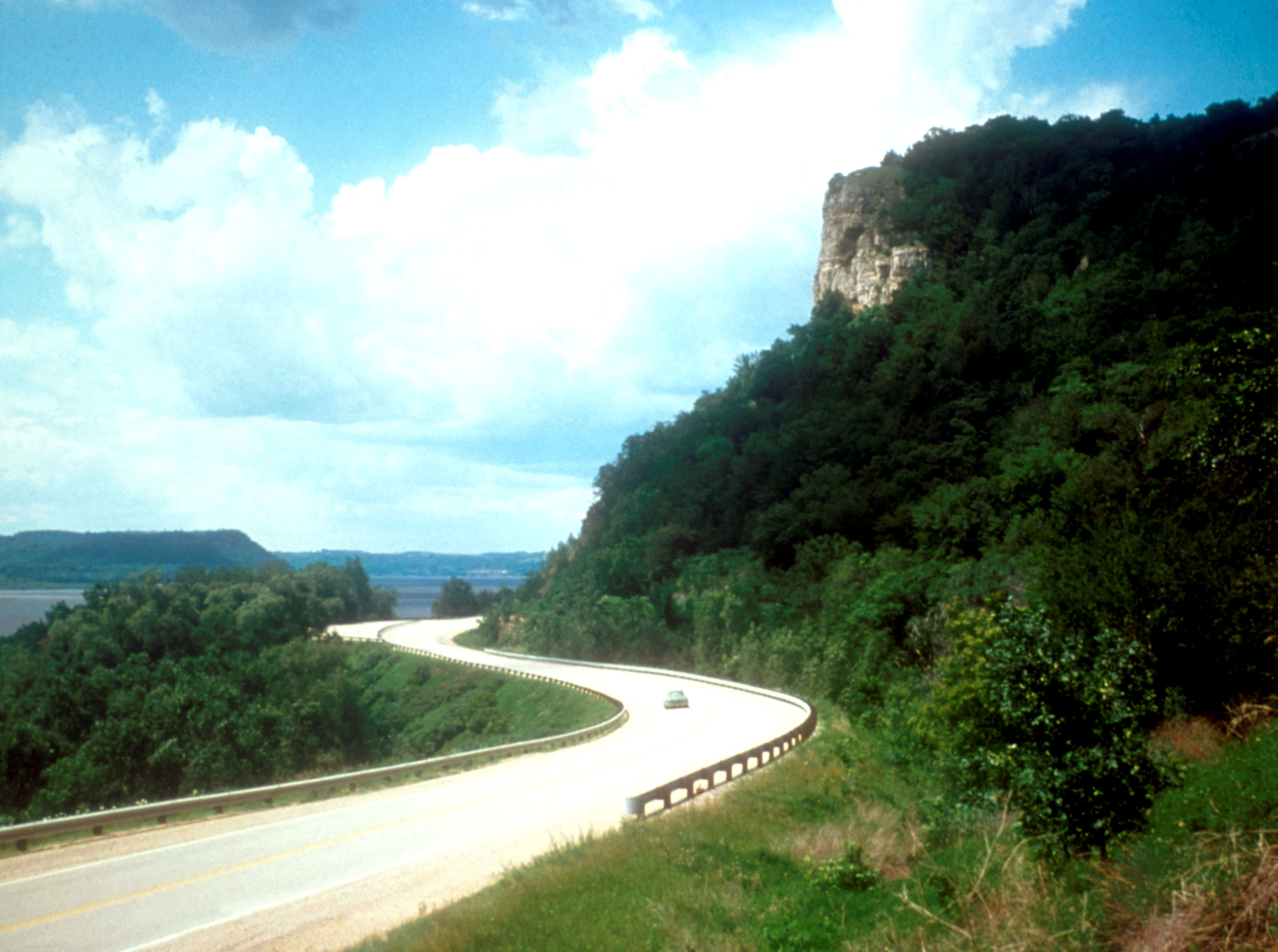
Looking north along the Great River Road in Wisconsin, with Minnesota in the distance on the west side of the Mississippi River

The Great River Road is not a single road but a designated route along connected segments of named and numbered highways and streets maintained by state, county, or local jurisdictions.

=== National and other routes ===
Until the early 1980s, a single Canada-to-Gulf alignment of the Great River Road, serving all ten states, was eligible for special federal funding. The states posted "National Route" plates above the markers on this route and marked their own alternate routes across the river, creating two alignments between New Orleans and Hastings-Point Douglas. Signs marking the National Route are now used only in Illinois and Minnesota. The National Route followed the following segments:

- Venice to Port Allen, Louisiana on the west bank
- Huey P. Long Bridge
- Baton Rouge, Louisiana to Greenville, Mississippi on the east bank
- Benjamin G. Humphreys Bridge (replaced by the Greenville Bridge in 2010)
- Lake Village to West Memphis, Arkansas on the west bank
- Memphis & Arkansas Bridge
- Memphis, Tennessee through Kentucky to Chester, Illinois on the east bank
- Chester Bridge
- McBride to Hannibal, Missouri on the west bank
- Mark Twain Memorial Bridge (replaced by the modern Mark Twain Memorial Bridge in 2000)
- East Hannibal to Niota, Illinois on the east bank
- Fort Madison Toll Bridge
- Fort Madison to Muscatine, Iowa on the west bank
- Muscatine High Bridge (replaced by the Norbert F. Beckey Bridge in 1972)
- Illinois City to East Dubuque, Illinois on the east bank
- Julien Dubuque Bridge
- Dubuque to Lansing, Iowa on the west bank
- Black Hawk Bridge
- De Soto, Wisconsin to Point Douglas, Minnesota on the east bank
- single route from Point Douglas to Lake Itasca

More recently, much of the Great River Road, including a portion in every state, has been designated a National Scenic Byway.

=== Western route ===
Louisiana

Few if any signs are present in Louisiana, but the route has been defined by state law. It begins at Venice on the west bank, following LA 23 into Gretna, where the eastern route splits. The western route, historically part of the National Route here, turns west on LA 18, which it follows all the way to Donaldsonville except for a detour on LA 541 from Harvey to Bridge City. A short piece of LA 1 connects the Great River Road to LA 405, which hugs the river to another junction with LA 1 in Plaquemine. LA 988 loops off LA 1 from northern Plaquemine back to yet another junction south of Port Allen, where the route leaves LA 1 again on Oaks Avenue, which becomes LA 987-5 and turns north along the river on River Road. LA 987-4 (Court Street) leads back west to Jefferson Avenue, which the Great River Road follows north to LA 986 along the river and under the Huey P. Long Bridge (US 190), which carries the National Route to the east bank (with access via LA 987-1).

A state alternate route begins along LA 986, becoming LA 415 near Lobdell and continuing along the river to Hermitage. LA 416 takes the route inland along the False River, an oxbow lake, to LA 1 near Knapp. LA 1 is followed through New Roads to Keller, where LA 15 splits to continue along the river to southwest of Vidalia. LA 131 leads northeast to Vidalia, from which US 425 and US 65 take the Great River Road to Arkansas.

Arkansas

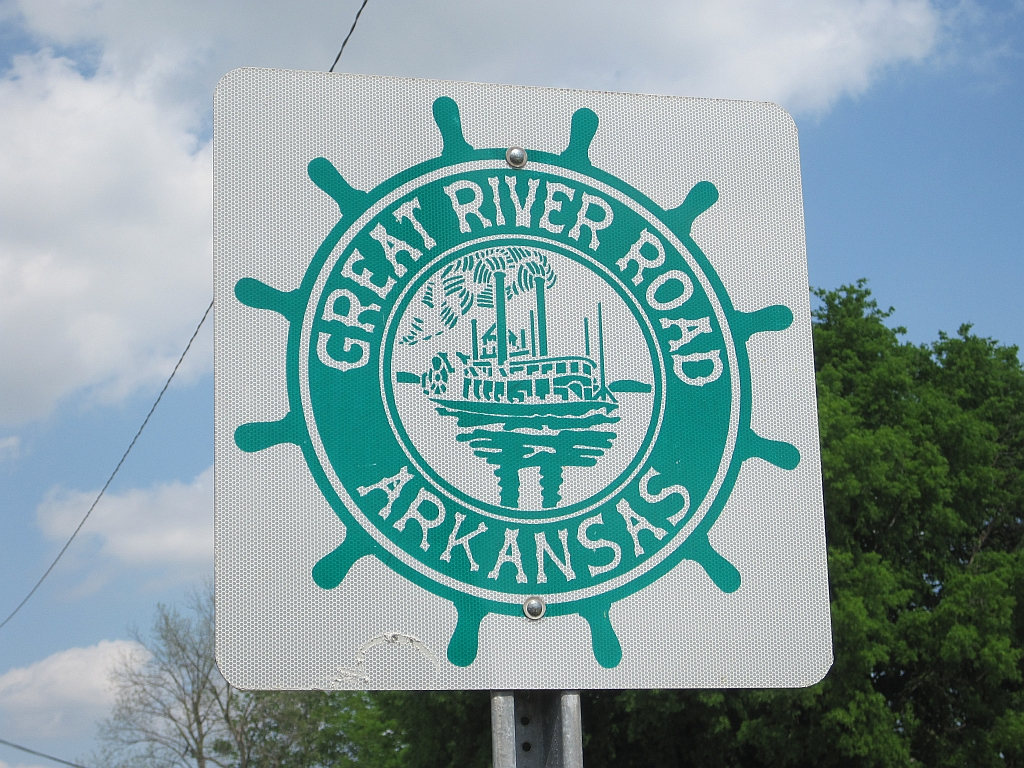
Great River Road sign in Arkansas

The Great River Road enters Arkansas from Louisiana on US 65, which it follows to Dumas. The National Route enters the state on the Greenville Bridge (originally the Benjamin G. Humphreys Bridge from 1940 to its replacement in 2010 by the current bridge), following US 82 to join US 65 near Lake Village. There it turns northeast on US 165, splitting onto Highway 1 in DeWitt until an intersection near Turner. The route follows a sequence of minor state highways: Highway 316 east, Highway 318 south, and Highway 20 east to Elaine, and Highway 44 northeast to Helena. It then uses short segments of Highway 20 and US 49 to reach US 49B into downtown Helena, where it leaves the state highway system, following Columbia, McDonough, and Holly Streets through a residential area. Between Helena and Bear Creek Lake, the Great River Road runs along County Road 239, a partially unpaved roadway hugging the east side of Crowley's Ridge through the St. Francis National Forest. Highway 44 begins again at Bear Creek Lake and takes the route northwest across Crowley's Ridge into Marianna, where it turns north on Poplar Street, west on Chestnut Street, and north on US 79. At Hughes, the Great River Road leaves US 79 and turns east on Highway 38, then north on Highway 147 around the north shore of Horseshoe Lake and on to US 70 at Lehi. US 70 leads east into West Memphis, where the National Route historically crossed the Memphis & Arkansas Bridge. The final leg of Arkansas's Great River Road turns north at West Memphis and uses Highway 77 and US 61 north into Missouri.

Missouri

The Great River Road is marked entirely along state-maintained highways in Missouri, with more than half along US 61. Although plates for the National Route are not used in the state, it can be identified based on signage in Illinois.

A state alternate route enters the state from Arkansas and follows US 61, including two overlaps with I-55, all the way to Perryville. The National Route crosses the Mississippi from Illinois on the Chester Bridge, following Route 51 south to Perryville and then turning north along US 61. At exit 170 south of Festus, the Great River Road joins I-55, following that highway into St. Louis and using I-44 and I-70 to exit 220 on the St. Peters-O'Fallon border. From there the National Route follows the entire length of Route 79 to I-72 in Hannibal, where it crosses the Mark Twain Memorial Bridge back to Illinois. A second state alternate begins in Hannibal by running west on I-72 to its end at US 61, then turning north on US 61. It follows Route 168 to Palmyra, rejoining US 61 for the rest of its path to Iowa, except for the portion through La Grange and Canton, where the Great River Road uses the former alignment of US 61, now Route B.

Iowa

As with Missouri, the National Route in Iowa can mostly be inferred by Illinois signage. On the other hand, the Great River Road uses a number of county and local roads in Iowa.

A state alternate route crosses the Des Moines River from Missouri into Keokuk, following US 136 into downtown. It follows a convoluted alignment, turning southeast on Main Street (still US 136), northeast on 4th Street, northwest on Orleans Avenue, northeast on 7th Street, northwest on Grand Avenue, and northeast on Rand Park Terrace, curving northwest onto the river-hugging Mississippi River Road (CR X28 and CR X21) through Montrose to US 61. US 61 and US 61 Business lead through Fort Madison to the Fort Madison Bridge and the entrance of the National Route into Iowa.

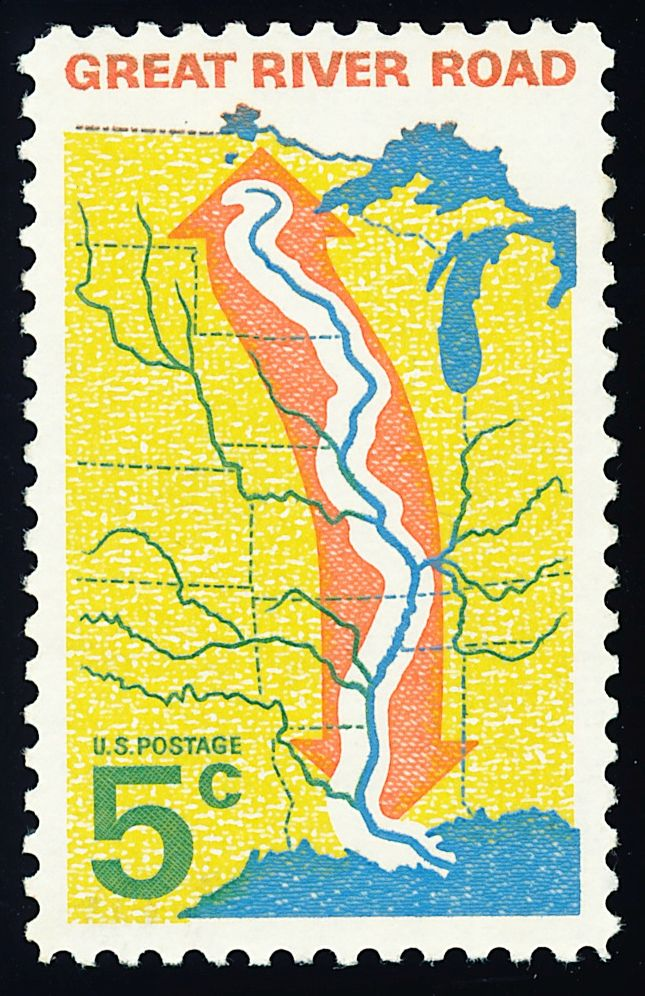
US Post Office stamp issued in 1966.

The National Route returns to US 61 via US 61 Business, splitting to follow CR X62 and Madison Avenue into Burlington. It turns east onto Main Drive through Crapo Park and curves back north on Main Street, which leads to CR X99 (former Iowa 99) to north of Toolesboro and CR X61 into Muscatine. After turning onto US 61 Business, the National Route leaves the state on the Norbert F. Beckey Bridge (Iowa 92).

A second state alternate route continues on US 61 Business, turning east to follow Iowa 22 along the river to Davenport. It follows another US 61 Business through that city and US 67 through Bettendorf, remaining on that highway until Sabula where it then follows US 52 north. After passing over the Great River Road Bridge in Bellevue the route reaches US 20 in Dubuque.

The National Route reenters Iowa on the Julien Dubuque Bridge (US 20), turning north onto Iowa 946 to reach US 52. In northern Sageville, the Great River Road turns north on CR C9Y, soon splitting onto Mud Lake Road, which, along with Circle Ridge Road, forms a loop back to CR C9Y in Sherrill. In Millville, the county road returns to US 52, which is followed into Guttenberg. As of 2012, the route through that city leaves US 52 east on Koerner Street, turning north on River Park Drive, west on Broadway Street, north on 2nd Street, west on Kosciusko Street, north on 3rd Street and through the municipal marina to CR X56. The Great River Road follows the entire length of CR X56 (including former Iowa 340) to McGregor, and then continues north on Iowa 76 and CR X52 (partly former Iowa 364) to Lansing, where the National Route crosses the Black Hawk Bridge (Iowa 9) to Wisconsin.

Finally, Iowa 26 carries a state alternate from Lansing north to the Minnesota state line at New Albin.

Minnesota

The Great River Road enters Minnesota on MN 26, connecting to US 61 in La Crescent via a short piece of MN 16. Except for a detour onto MN 316, US 61 carries this state alternate route to its junction with the National Route in Hastings.

=== Eastern route ===
Louisiana

A state alternate route begins in Gretna and crosses the Crescent City Connection (US 90 Business) into New Orleans. Tchoupitoulas Street leads along the river to Audubon Park, with Magazine Street, Leake Avenue, and Oak Street continuing from the other side of the park to the city line. In Jefferson Parish, the road becomes River Road (partly LA 611-1), from which the Great River Road jogs northwest on Hickory Street to LA 48. LA 48 hugs the river to Norco, where US 61 crosses the Bonnet Carre Spillway to LA 628, connecting in LaPlace to LA 636-3 and LA 44. Another river-hugging highway, LA 44 leads to Burnside, where LA 942 continues to Darrow; the route then follows LA 75, LA 991, and LA 327 around the curves of the river to Baton Rouge. Through that city, the Great River Road uses LA 30, Government Street, River Road (partly US 61 Business), State Capitol Drive, Third Street, Spanish Town Road, Fifth Street, and Capitol Access Road (LA 3045) to I-110. At the Airline Highway interchange on I-110, the National Route comes over the Huey P. Long Bridge (US 190) and turns north to follow I-110 and US 61 into Mississippi.

In January 1811, there was a rebellion of several hundred enslaved and free black people referred to as the 1811 German Coast uprising, beginning in St. John the Baptist Parish and continuing on a 26-mile (42 km) route through lower Louisiana toward New Orleans. A Louisiana militia countered the rebellion, the largest revolt of enslaved persons in United States history. Afterward, there were trials on the plantations and executions of the majority involved in the revolt. The heads of many of those executed were placed on spikes along the Great River Road.

Some sources show the Great River Road continuing south from New Orleans along the east bank on LA 46 and LA 39 to Pointe à la Hache or even further down to Venice.

Mississippi

In Mississippi, much of the Great River Road follows US 61. Between Onward and west of Lula, it runs nearer to the river on MS 1. The routing in the vicinity of Lula is not marked; the only state-maintained road connecting to US 61 is US 49. Historically, the National Route turned off MS 1 at Greenville and followed US 82 to the Benjamin G. Humphreys Bridge (replaced by the Greenville Bridge in 2010).

Tennessee

The Great River Road enters Tennessee on US 61, following that highway along 3rd Street into Downtown Memphis. The National Route historically crossed the Memphis & Arkansas Bridge, meeting 3rd Street at Crump Boulevard. The route follows a number of city streets along the riverfront: G.E. Patterson Avenue, Main Street, Beale Street, Riverside Drive, Jefferson Avenue, Front Street (passing the Pyramid), the A.W. Willis Bridge, Island Drive, Mud Island Drive, Second Street, and Whitney Avenue, joining US 51 in northern Memphis. It soon turns off on SR 388, and then follows a sequence of local roads past Meeman-Shelby Forest State Park: Locke Cuba Road, Bluff Road, Riverbluff Road, Herring Hill Road (which is partly unpaved), Pryor Road, and Richardson Landing Road. At Richardsons the route turns east with SR 59 to Covington, then runs north on US 51.

After crossing the Hatchie River on its westernmost bridge, the Great River Road again leaves US 51 at Henning, looping west on SR 87, north on partly unpaved Crutcher Lake Road (past Fort Pillow State Park) and Four Mile Lane, and east on SR 19 to rejoin US 51 at Ripley. It leaves US 51 for the last time at Halls, following SR 88 west to near Hales Point, turning north on SR 181 atop a levee to SR 79 near Cottonwood Grove. The route continues north, slightly east of the levee, along Hoecake Road, Robison Bayou Road, Bingham Road, Mooring Road, and SR 21 into Tiptonville. The Great River Road ends its Tennessee stretch by following SR 78 to the state line.

Kentucky

The Great River Road's National Route enters Kentucky from Tennessee on KY 94 and runs northeast and east through Hickman. At Cayce it turns north to follow KY 239, continuing on KY 123 from west of Clinton through Columbus to the Bardwell area. There two routes are signed, one following KY 123 to Bardwell and the other bypassing the city to the west on KY 1203. The last leg in Kentucky takes US 51 to the bridge across the Ohio River to Cairo, Illinois.

Signs are present for an alternate route that runs inland through Fulton, Clinton, and Arlington along KY 125, KY 166, KY 1648, US 51, and KY 80. It leaves the main route at Hickman and ends north of Columbus.

Illinois

Portions of the Great River Road in Illinois are signed as the National Route, while other portions lack this banner. National Route signs continue to Mississippi River bridges, with the unbannered alternate routes spurring from these before the crossings. A number of spurs are also signed to parks and other points of interest off the main route.

The initial segment in Illinois is part of the National Route, entering from Kentucky at Cairo and leaving at Chester. It follows US 51 off the Cairo Ohio River Bridge through Cairo, and then IL 3 paralleling the river to near Chester. Before entering Chester city limits, the route turns west onto a signed truck bypass that runs closer to the river. It ends by turning southwest onto the Chester Bridge (IL 150) to Missouri.

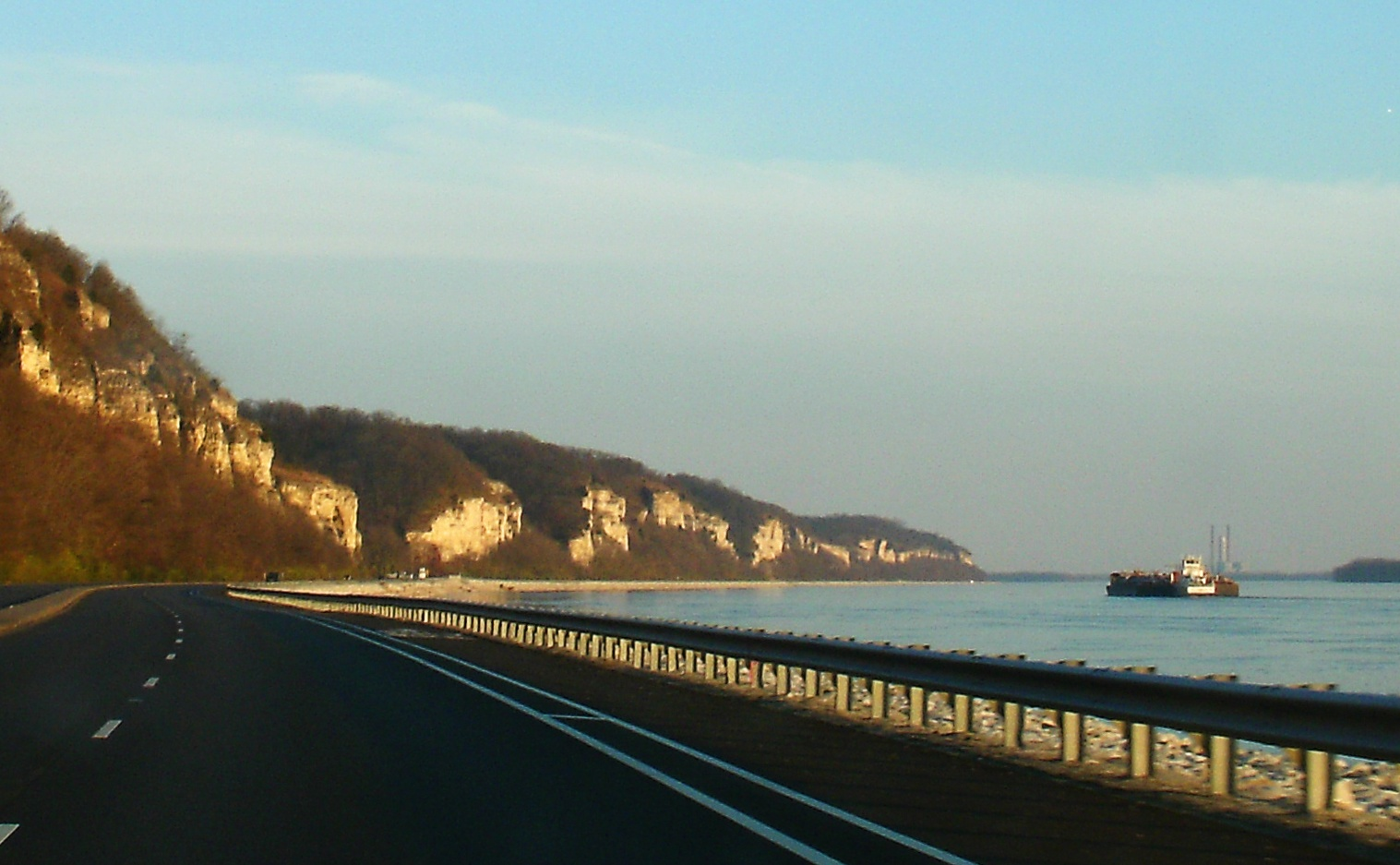
Illinois Route 100 14 mi (23 km) upstream of Alton

The first section of unbannered route stretches from Chester to near Fall Creek. It begins at the approach to the Chester Bridge, following IL 150 and the remainder of the truck bypass back to IL 3, which carries the Great River Road all the way to East St. Louis. But instead of continuing along IL 3 through the riverside industrial areas, the route turns east on I-55 / I-70, north on IL 111, and back west on I-270 to rejoin IL 3 in Granite City. It soon leaves IL 3 for the last time to follow IL 143 into downtown Alton and then a short piece of US 67 to reach IL 100, which runs directly along the river for a significant distance before turning inland at Grafton. Rather than cross the Illinois River on the Brussels Ferry, the Great River Road remains with IL 100 alongside the Illinois River, first on the east side to the Hardin Bridge and then on the west side to Kampsville. There it turns west to rejoin the Mississippi River, following IL 96 to north of Hull and former IL 57 to the I-172 interchange near Fall Creek.

The National Route reenters Illinois on the Mark Twain Memorial Bridge (I-72) from Hannibal, Missouri and follows I-172 north to the IL 57 interchange, where the unbannered route from Chester ends. It follows extant IL 57 into Quincy and then US 24 and IL 96 to a point east of Warsaw, turning west onto that city's Main Street and leaving to the northeast on 6th Street. A short jog east on US 136 in Hamilton returns the Great River Road to IL 96, which it follows, mostly right along the river, through Nauvoo to Niota. The National Route turns northwest there on IL 9 to the Fort Madison Bridge into Fort Madison, Iowa.

IL 96 continues to carry the unbannered route beyond Niota to Lomax, where IL 96 turns inland and the Great River Road follows Carman Road to US 34 near Gulfport. After following US 34 east to near Gladstone, it again turns north onto IL 164 through Oquawka, turning north just east of that village onto a county road that becomes 10th Street in Keithsburg. Main Street leads west to 4th Street and another county road, ending up on IL 17 west of Joy. Finally, after 2.5 miles (4 km) of travel west on IL 17 to a point north of New Boston, a third north–south county road (designated as CR A in Rock Island County) takes Great River Road traffic to IL 92 opposite Muscatine, Iowa.

The National Route reenters from Muscatine, following IL 92 east through the Quad Cities except for a detour onto County Road TT east of Illinois City. On the East Moline-Silvis border, the Great River Road turns back north along IL 84, which stays near the river most of the way to a point southeast of Galena. US 20 carries the route through Galena to East Dubuque, where the National Route crosses the river one last time into Dubuque, Iowa on the Julien Dubuque Bridge. No route is signed on the Illinois side of the Mississippi north of East Dubuque, although Wisconsin Highway 35 has Great River Road markers all the way to the state line (at IL 35).

Wisconsin

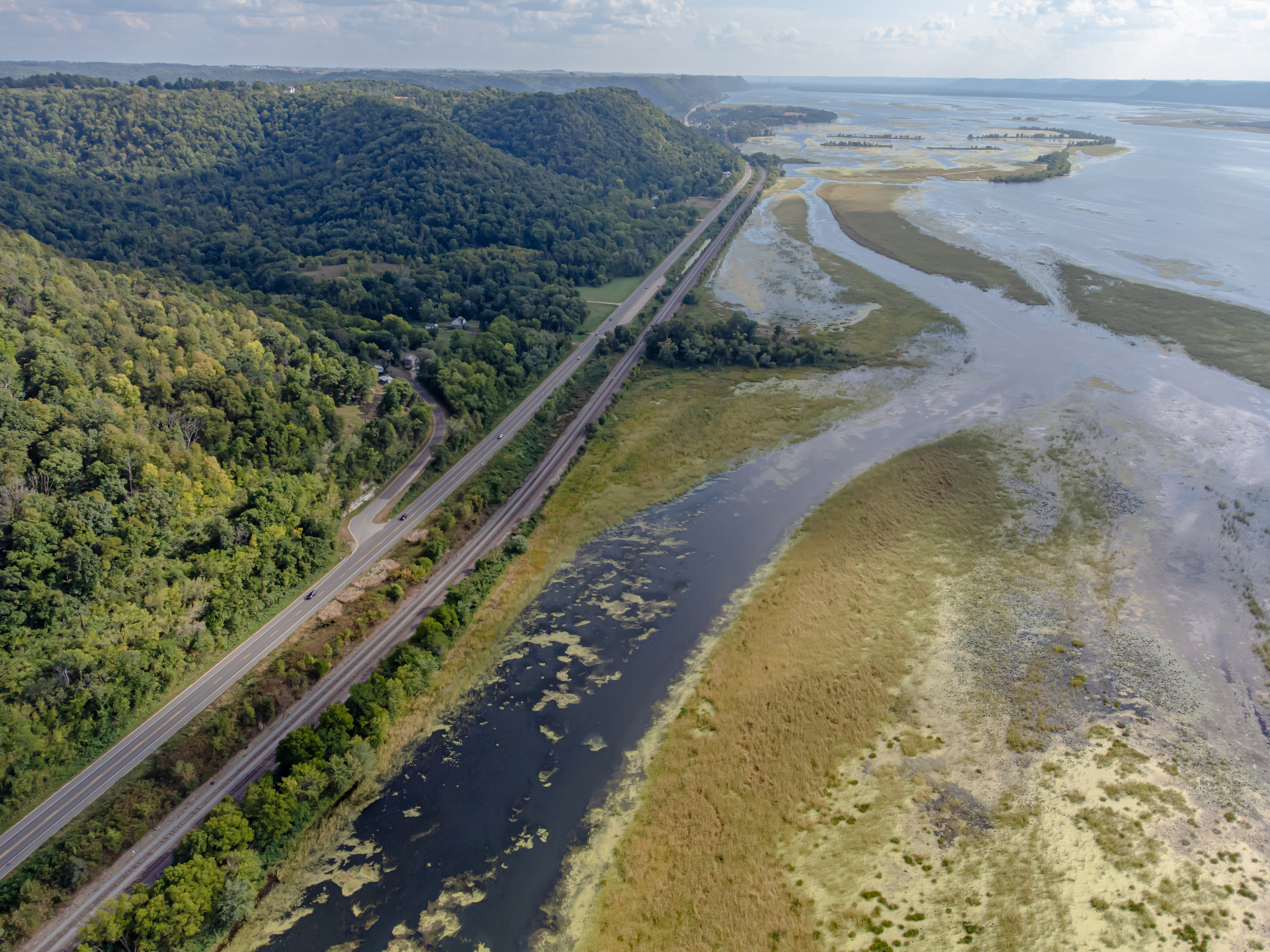
WIS 35 south of La Crosse looking south

WIS 35, which hugs Wisconsin's western border, carries most of the Great River Road in that state from its entrance near East Dubuque, Illinois. The longest separation from WIS 35 is between Tennyson and a point south of Bridgeport, where WIS 35 heads inland through Lancaster and the Great River Road follows WIS 133 to Cassville, County VV and County A to Bagley, and County X and County C to return to WIS 35. The historic National Route entered Wisconsin on the Black Hawk Bridge (WIS 82), turning north on WIS 35 near De Soto. US 61 and US 53 take the route through downtown La Crosse, which WIS 35 bypasses to the east, and it follows WIS 35 Business in Holmen. Finally, at Prescott, the Great River Road turns west on US 10 across the St. Croix River on the Prescott Drawbridge into Minnesota.

Minnesota

On entering Minnesota, the east-side alignment of the Great River Road (here signed as the National Route) follows US 10 west and US 61 south across the Mississippi on the Hastings Bridge into Hastings, where it joins with the west-side alignment.

The two sides of the Great River Road combine at the south end of the Hastings Bridge (US 61) in Hastings, Minnesota, with a single route (marked as the National Route) continuing to the headwaters at Lake Itasca. The route leaves Hastings to the west by following County 42, which begins along 2nd Street, west to the junction with MN 55. MN 55 turns north as it merges with US 52, and the Great River Road soon splits onto County 56 (former MN 56) into South St. Paul. There it follows I-494 east across the Mississippi on the Wakota Bridge and again turns north on US 10 / US 61, soon entering St. Paul. Shepard Road/Warner Road (mostly County 36 and 37) takes the route west along the St. Paul riverfront to I-35E, where it turns back south and recrosses the Mississippi on the Lexington Bridge. MN 13 takes it to Mendota, at which point it crosses the Minnesota River near its mouth on the Mendota Bridge (MN 55) and passes Fort Snelling. After MN 55 enters Minneapolis, the Great River Road turns east on 46th Street (County 46), south on Minnehaha Avenue, and east on Godfrey Parkway to reach the south end of the West River Parkway, a segment of the Grand Rounds National Scenic Byway. This scenic drive parallels the west bank of the Mississippi through downtown Minneapolis, becoming West River Road at the Plymouth Avenue Bridge and ending at the Broadway Avenue Bridge (County 66). After crossing the Mississippi again, the Great River Road turns north on Marshall Street (County 23) and East River Road (County 1), then turns back west to cross the Mississippi one last time in the Twin Cities area on the I-694 Bridge. From there to Champlin (opposite Anoka), it sticks to the old pre-freeway route of US 169 as much as possible, taking MN 252 north to Brookdale Drive and jogging east to West River Road, which leads to County 12 into Champlin.

County 12 continues along the Mississippi, becoming County 42 in Wright County. The route jogs north on MN 101 and then turns west on County 39 along the river to Monticello. There it picks up former MN 152 (which has been supplanted by I-94), now known as County 75 to St. Cloud. Through that city, the Great River Road follows Clearwater Road and 9th Avenue, crossing the Mississippi into Sauk Rapids on the Sauk Rapids Regional Bridge. County 33 (Benton Drive) leads to Sartell and another river crossing, the Sartell Bridge (County 29 / County 133), from which it uses the short County 78 to reach County 1. This road and its continuations in Morrison County - County 21, 25, and 52 - follow the west bank of the Mississippi to Little Falls, where it jogs east on MN 27 to County 213, which ends at MN 115 at the Camp Ripley entrance. The Camp Ripley Bridge takes MN 115 east to its terminus at MN 371, which the Great River Road follows north to Baxter, crossing the Mississippi at the south city limits.

As of 2010, the route through Baxter left MN 371 at College Drive, heading east back over the Mississippi on the College Drive Bridge into Brainerd. There it turned north on East River Road, east on Laurel Street, north on 6th Street (MN 371 Business), east on MN 210, and north on 8th Avenue (County 3). However, the left turn from College Drive onto East River Road is no longer permitted due to a reconstruction project.

The Great River Road leaves Brainerd to the north on County 3 (former MN 25), crossing the Mississippi again at the city limits. North of Merrifield it turns east on County 19, which leads to County 11 and then MN 6 south across the Mississippi and into Crosby. MN 210 leads east to Aitkin, where the route turns back to the north on County 1 and crosses the river yet again, then follows the unpaved County 21 and County 10 (separated by a bit of US 169) to Palisade. County 10 continues as a paved road from that city, north across MN 200 near Jacobson and northwest to Grand Rapids (becoming County 3 in Itasca County). The Great River Road does not cross the river in the Grand Rapids area, turning south on 7th Avenue, west on 10th Street and County 23, north on County 76, and west on County 63. At MN 6 the route jogs south to County 28, where it turns west and soon enters Cass County as County 65. Several more turns—north on County 74, west on County 3, and north to remain on County 3—take it to another Mississippi crossing onto County 18, from which it turns west on US 2 into Ball Club. County 39 and a bit of MN 46 lead to County 9, which runs southwest across the river at the Lake Winnibigoshish outlet and back to US 2, where it turns west to and beyond Bena.

From Bena to Bemidji, the Great River Road follows a large number of county roads that approximate the winding course of the Mississippi. These are, in order, 91, 54, 91, 10, 39 (bridge across the Mississippi near the Cass Lake outlet), 12, 33 (bridge between Allens Bay and Andrusia Lake), 8 (bridge between Andrusia Lake and Wolf Lake), 27, and 12 (yet another bridge). The route turns west onto 1st Street to reach MN 197, which crosses the river again into downtown Bemidji, where it turns west on 5th Street. That road continues west and south as County 7 (with yet another bridge), County 3, and County 10, from which the Great River Road again turns west on County 9, which becomes County 40 in Clearwater County and crosses the river yet again. Turning south on County 2, the route crosses the Mississippi River one last time before it crosses MN 200 and enters Itasca State Park on County 122.

=== Canadian extensions ===
The Great River Road formerly continued north into Canada. There were two routes, one from Bemidji into Ontario and the other from Lake Itasca into Manitoba. The former followed US 71 to the Fort Frances–International Falls International Bridge, then Highway 71 to Longbow Corners on the Trans-Canada Highway (Highway 17) east of Kenora. Some sources indicate that it continued east on Highway 17 to Dryden or north on Highway 596 to Minaki. The other route followed MN 200 west from Lake Itasca to Zerkel, then ran north on MN 92 to Clearbrook, County 5 and BIA 3 to the shore of Lower Red Lake, MN 89 to Roseau, and east on MN 11 to Warroad. Crossing into Manitoba on MN 313, the Great River Road then followed Highway 12 north to near Ste. Anne, Highway 1 (Trans-Canada Highway) to Winnipeg, and Highway 59 to near Victoria Beach, where it turned southeast on Highway 11 to near Seven Sisters Falls, Provincial Road 307 to near Rennie, Highway 44 to near West Hawk Lake, and finally east on the Trans-Canada Highway (Highways 1 and 17) to join the Ontario branch at Kenora.

== History ==
The Mississippi River Parkway Planning Commission was formed in 1938 to develop plans for what was to become the Great River Road. Secretary of the Interior Harold Ickes urged the governors of the 10 states along the Mississippi River to form the commission. State planning officials had been developing the concept of a Mississippi River Parkway as an extension of an idea for a recreational river road that had been first put forward by the Missouri Planning Board in 1936.

The commission was instrumental not only in the early planning and development of the parkway but also in its construction, promotion, marketing, and development. (Now known as the Mississippi River Parkway Commission and headquartered in Minneapolis, the commission continues to promote, preserve, and enhance the resources of the Mississippi River Valley and the Great River Road. Representatives of the 10 states and two Canadian provinces serve on the commission's board of directors, and they serve as chairpersons of their state Mississippi River Parkway commissions.)

The U.S. House of Representatives' Committee on Public Lands held hearings in 1939 and 1940 to discuss a bill that would have authorized a feasibility study of the Mississippi River Parkway concept. While popular, the parkway idea was soon overshadowed by World War II.

It wasn't until 1949 that Congress approved funding for a feasibility study. The study, "Parkway for the Mississippi River", was completed by the Bureau of Public Roads (BPR) (predecessor agency to the Federal Highway Administration) in 1951.

The study concluded that a parkway for the Mississippi River would benefit the nation as a whole. However, the report made an important distinction. Because it would be too expensive to build an entirely new parkway, BPR recommended instead that the project be designated a scenic route.

The scenic route would consist of existing riverside roads, and new construction would be limited to connecting the existing roads so that a continuous route could be developed. The existing roads would be upgraded to parkway quality. The modified approach would save a great deal of land acquisition and new construction costs. Another consideration was that some of the most scenic locations along the river had already been preempted by existing highways, railroads, and towns and cities.

The concept of a scenic route rather than a national parkway was adopted. As a result, the Great River Road is not owned by the National Park Service, as is the case with true national parkways, such as the Blue Ridge and Natchez Trace Parkways. Instead, the states have developed the Great River Road through a nationally coordinated program. BPR recommended "that the selected route shall be improved in a superior manner and that it should be dedicated to recreational purposes as well as to moving traffic". The needed construction and improvements "can be done with regular apportionments under the federal highway act or by the states on their own..."

With the Federal Highway Act of 1954, Congress responded to the recommendations of BPR by appropriating planning funds. BPR was authorized to work with each of the states to develop specific criteria for the parkway and to determine one specific route within each state for the Mississippi River Parkway. By the late 1950s, the familiar green-and-white pilot's wheel marker began to spring up on various sections of the designated route. Planning continued through the 1960s. The 1961 Iowa highway map was the first map in that state to highlight the route.

With the completion of all the planning reports in early 1970, actual development of the Great River Road was ready to begin. Although a number of states put up Great River Road highway signs and used available state funds for scenic bluff protection and road improvements, full-scale development funds were not yet available. Legislation to fund the development of the Great River Road was included for the first time as part of the Federal-Aid Highway Act of 1973. From 1973 to 1982, Congress authorized a total of $314 million for the Great River Road. Most of those funds ($251 million) were allocated directly to the states.

With funds available, development could begin in earnest. In 1976, the Federal Highway Administration (FHWA) issued program guidelines setting criteria for the Great River Road. The states then set up their own procedures for selecting the route of the Great River Road within their state boundaries.

"The Great River Road should be located within designated segments to take advantage of scenic views and provide the traveler with the opportunity to enjoy the unique features of the Mississippi River and its recreational opportunities", the guidelines said. The criteria also specified that the Great River Road should provide for a variety of experiences or themes, including history, geology, and culture, and that the road should provide convenient access to larger population centers. Protection of the Mississippi River corridor was required by "appropriate route selection, effective control and development, and scenic easement acquisition".

The route of the federal Great River Road consists of sections that conform to the FHWA guidelines and that were eligible for the Great River Road funds in the 1970s and early 1980s. The states have designated alternative routes that include sections with significant scenic, historic, and recreational interest. While the federal Great River Road crisscrosses the river within each state, the alternative routes provide Great River Road routes on both sides of the river from the headwaters to the gulf. The Mississippi River Parkway Commission makes no distinction between the federal and state routes in its promotional efforts. However, some states do use highway signs that distinguish between a federal and state route.

In 2021, eight of the 10 state Great River Road National Scenic Byways were named All-American Roads by the Federal Highway Administration.

== See also ==
- List of Ontario Tourist Routes
