= Illinois Route 92 =

State highway in northwestern Illinois, US

Illinois Route 92
- IL 92 highlighted in red

Route information
- Maintained by IDOT
- Length: 106.41 mi (171.25 km) Length includes portions of route that are run on one-way streets, resulting in a double-counting of this mileage.
- Existed: 1939–present

Major junctions
- West end: Iowa 92 in Illinois City
- I-280 in Rock Island; US 67 in Rock Island; I-74 / US 6 in Moline I-80 / I-88 / IL 5 / IL 110 (CKC) in East Moline I-88 / IL 110 (CKC) in Joslin
- East end: US 34 in LaMoille

Location
- Country: United States
- State: Illinois
- Counties: Rock Island, Henry, Bureau

Highway system
- Illinois State Highway System; Interstate; US; State; Tollways; Scenic
← IL 91	→ IL 93

Illinois Route 92 (IL 92 or Route 92) is an east–west state highway in northwest Illinois. It runs from the Norbert F. Beckey Bridge across the Mississippi River where it meets the eastern end of Iowa Highway 92, east to U.S. Route 34 in La Moille. This is a distance of 106.41 miles (171.25 km). It is part of a continuous 886-mile (1,426 km) four-state "Highway 92" which begins in Torrington, Wyoming, goes through Nebraska and Iowa and before terminating in Illinois.

== Route description ==
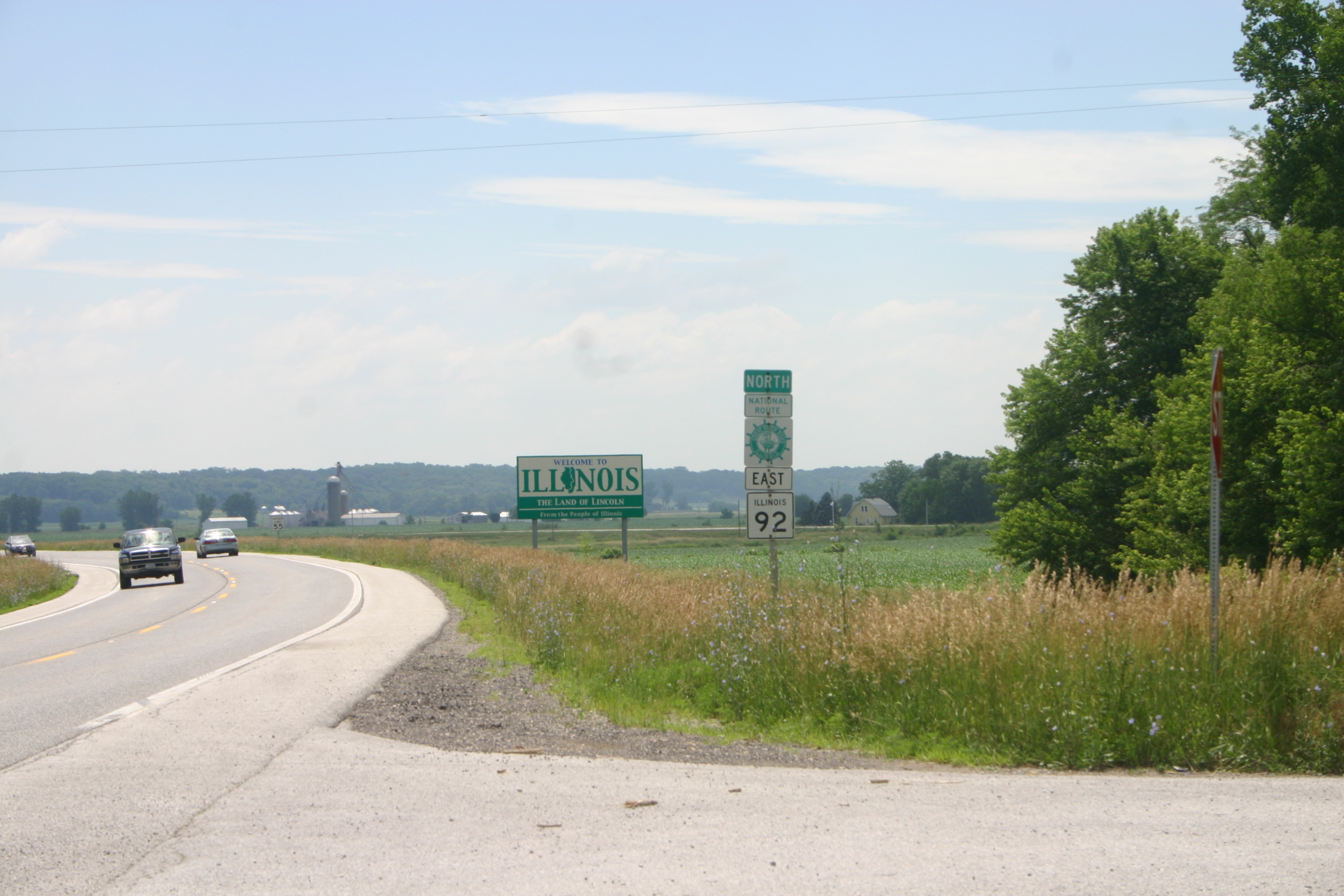
Illinois Route 92 enters the state from Iowa.

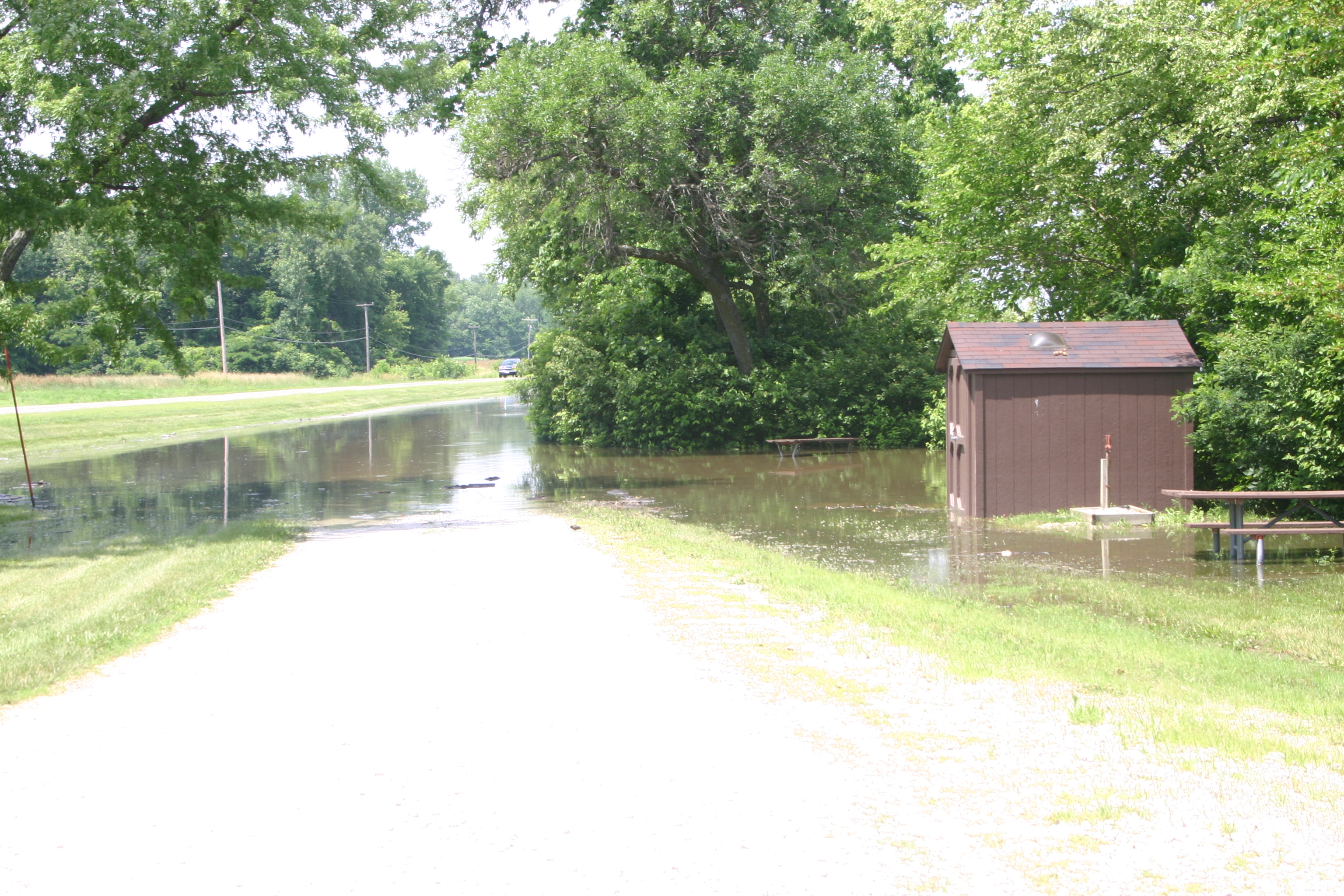
Roadside park along flooded Mississippi River, on Illinois Route 92 at Andalusia, Illinois

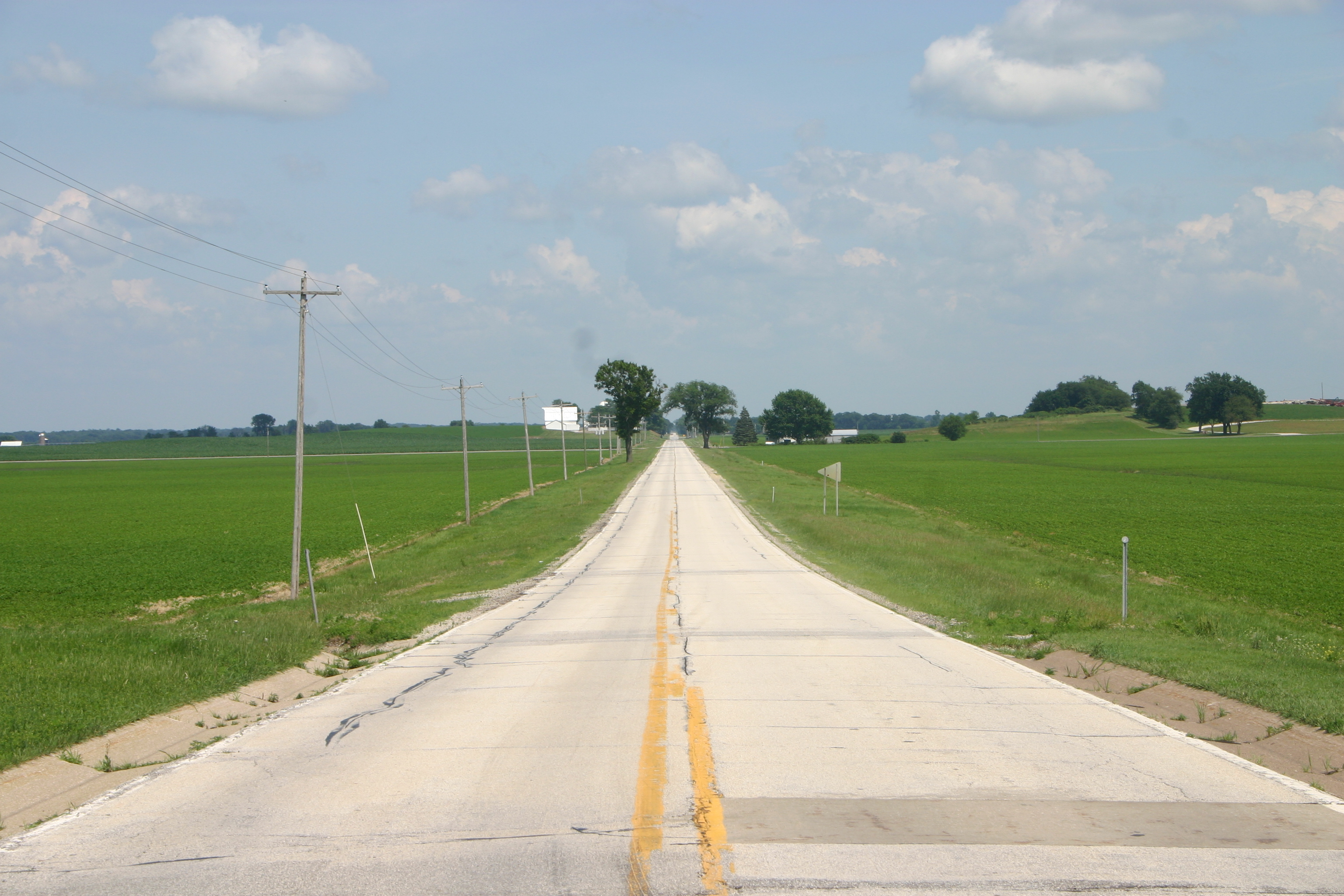
Illinois Route 92 in the fertile farmland of western Illinois

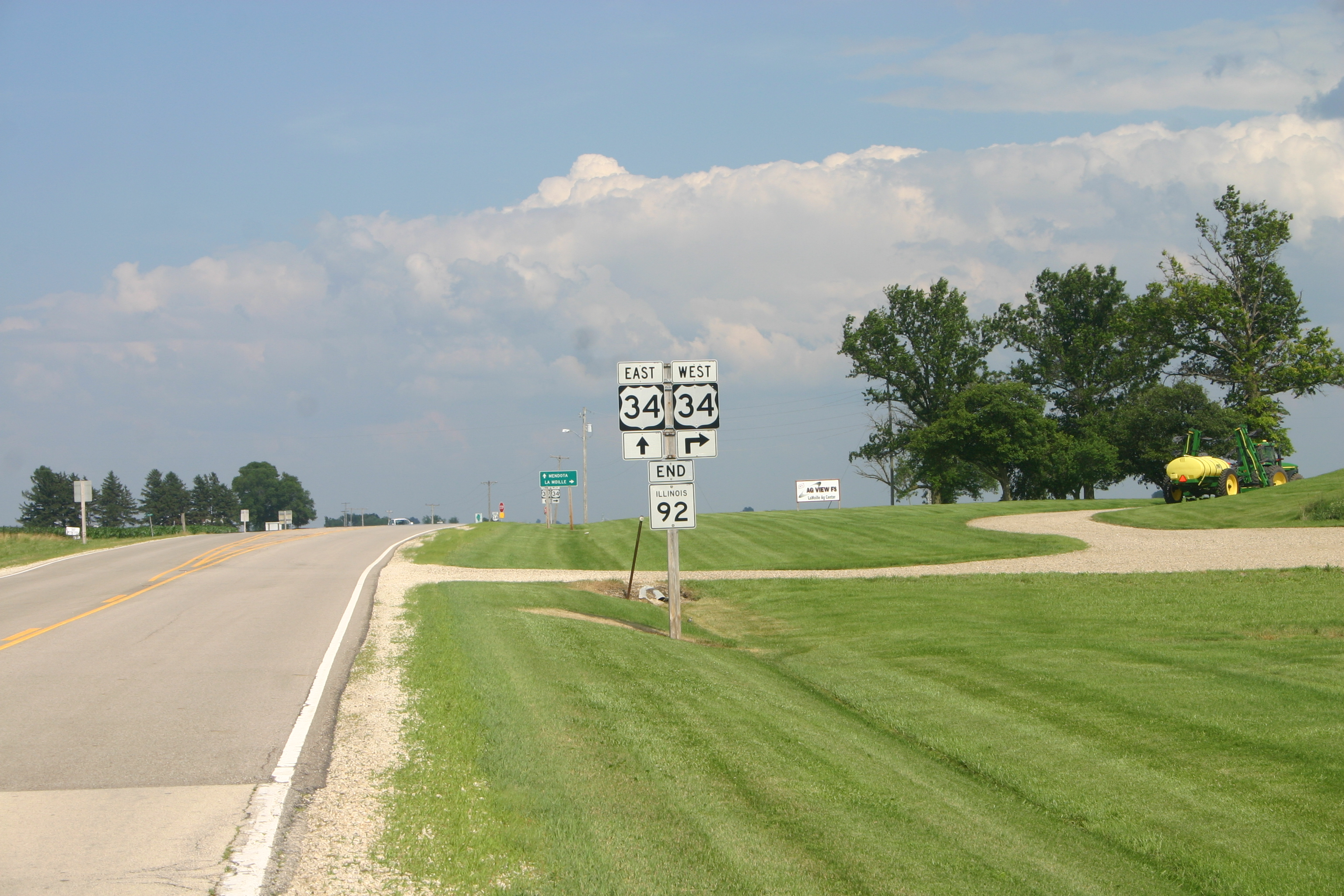
Sign marking the eastern end of IL-92, and of the 4-state Route 92, at US 34 in La Moille, Illinois

Illinois Route 92 begins on the Norbert F. Beckey Bridge over the Mississippi River, and first heads eastward across farmland, before intersecting Illinois Route 192, which was a former alignment of Route 92. At the IL 192 junction, IL 92 turns northward and then follows the east bank of the Mississippi through Andalusia; this section is frequently flooded, during which IL 192 is used as a detour. At Andalusia, it serves the Ski Snowstar winter sports park. After Andalusia, it turns northward, becoming the Centennial Expressway, intersecting Interstate 280 and entering Downtown Rock Island.

In Rock Island, the Centennial Expressway ends at a junction with U.S. Route 67, at the east bank end of the Rock Island Centennial Bridge. Route 92 continues eastward on surface streets, paralleling the river, through Downtown Rock Island, Moline, and East Moline, with several parts routed on a pair of one-way streets. In Downtown Moline, it intersects concurrent Interstate 74 and U.S. Route 6 at the east bank end of the I-74 Bridge over the Mississippi. At the border between East Moline and Silvis it intersects Illinois Route 84, with which it is concurrent through Silvis. At a partial cloverleaf interchange with Illinois Route 5 and Illinois Route 84 in Carbon Cliff, Route 92 turns northeast, concurrent with Route 5, as an expressway. At a cloverleaf interchange with Interstate 80, Route 5 ends, and Route 92 continues as a freeway, beginning a concurrency with Interstate 88 and Illinois Route 110 (Chicago–Kansas City Expressway).

After running concurrently with I-88 and IL 110 for 6 miles (9.7 km), IL 92 separates at I-88 Exit 6 and heads east on its own. It traverses the rich Illinois farmland, crossing the Rock River and the historic Hennepin Canal. It jogs north briefly, concurrent with Illinois Route 78, and passes through the small towns of Walnut and Ohio before ending at a junction with U.S. Route 34 in La Moille.

== Major intersections ==
County	Location	mi	km	Exit	Destinations	Notes
Mississippi River		0.00	0.00		Iowa 92 west / Great River Road (National Route) south – Muscatine	Continuation into Iowa
Mississippi River		0.00	0.00	Norbert F. Beckey Bridge; Illinois–Iowa line		
Rock Island	Drury Township	0.3	0.48		Great River Road Spur – Lock and Dam No. 16	
Rock Island	Drury Township	1.8	2.9		Great River Road south (322nd Street West / CR A) – New Boston, Blanchard Island Recreation Area	
Rock Island	Illinois City	7.6	12.2		CR TT east / Great River Road (National Route) north (238th Street West)	Western end of Great River Road overlap
Rock Island	Buffalo Prairie Township	12.2	19.6		IL 192 east to IL 94 – Taylor Ridge	
Rock Island	Buffalo Prairie Township	14.4	23.2		CR TT west / Great River Road (National Route) south (Loud Thunder Road) – Loud Thunder Forest Preserve	Eastern end of Great River Road overlap
Rock Island	Andalusia	19.6	31.5		Great River Road Spur (1st Street) – River Access, Business District	
Rock Island	Rock Island	24.7	39.8		Centennial Expressway south – Golf Course	At-grade intersection
Rock Island	Rock Island	26.2	42.2	—	I-280 – Des Moines, Chicago	I-280 exit 11; southern end of limited-access section of Centennial Expressway
Rock Island	Rock Island	27.7	44.6	—	31st Avenue	
Rock Island	Rock Island	28.6	46.0	—	Great River Road Spur / 18th Avenue – Sunset Park Scenic Overlook	
Rock Island	Rock Island	29.2	47.0	—	7th Avenue	
Rock Island	Rock Island	29.8	48.0	—	11th Street	Westbound exit and eastbound entrance; northern end of Centennial Expressway
Rock Island	Rock Island	30.1	48.4		US 67 north (Centennial Bridge) – Business District	Interchange; no direct access to US 67 south
Rock Island	Moline				Rock Island Arsenal	Interchange; westbound entrance only
Rock Island	Moline	34.4	55.4		23rd Street to I-74 (US 6)	I-74 exit 2
Rock Island	East Moline–Silvis line	43.1	69.4		IL 84 north / Great River Road (National Route) north (19th Street) – Savanna	Eastern end of Great River Road overlap; western end of IL 84 overlap
Rock Island	Carbon Cliff	44.5	71.6		IL 5 west (John Deere Road) / IL 84 south (2nd Avenue) – Carbon Cliff	interchange; eastern end of IL 84 overlap; western end of IL 5 overlap
Rock Island	Hampton Township	48.9	78.7		IL 5 ends / I-88 begins	Eastern end of IL 5 overlap; western end of I-88 overlap
Rock Island	East Moline	48.9	78.7	1A-B	I-80 / IL 110 (CKC) west to I-74 – Des Moines, Peoria	Exit numbers follow I-88; western end of IL 110 (CKC) overlap; I-80 exit 4
Rock Island	East Moline	49.6	79.8	2	Old IL 2	
Rock Island	Zuma Township	54.5	87.7		I-88 east / IL 110 (CKC) east – Dixon	Eastern end of I-88 / IL 110 (CKC) overlap; I-88 exit 6
Rock River				Bridge		
Henry	Phenix Township	58.9	94.8		IL 82 south – Geneseo	
Henry	Yorktown Township	70.3	113.1		IL 78 south – Kewanee	Western end of IL 78 overlap
Henry	Yorktown Township	71.2	114.6		IL 78 north (Bishop Road) – Prophetstown	Eastern end of IL 78 overlap
Bureau	Fairfield Township	79.0	127.1		IL 172 north (Tampico Road) – Tampico, Birthplace of President Ronald Reagan	
Bureau	Greenville Township	84.4	135.8		IL 40 (900E Street) – Sterling, Peoria	
Bureau	Ohio	96.2	154.8		IL 26 (Main Street) – Dixon, Princeton	
Bureau	La Moille	106.41	171.25		3000E Street / US 34 (Main Street) to IL 89 – Mendota, La Moille	Eastern terminus; highway continues as US 34 east
1.000 mi = 1.609 km; 1.000 km = 0.621 mi: Concurrency terminus; Incomplete access; Route transition
