= Illinois Route 84 =

State highway in northwestern Illinois, US

Illinois Route 84
- IL 84 highlighted in red

Route information
- Maintained by IDOT
- Length: 93.93 mi (151.17 km)
- Existed: 1955–present
- Tourist routes: Great River Road

Major junctions
- South end: US 6 in Colona
- I-80 in East Moline; US 30 in Fulton; US 52 / IL 64 in Savanna; US 20 in Elizabeth; US 20 in Galena
- North end: WIS 80 in Galena

Location
- Country: United States
- State: Illinois
- Counties: Henry, Rock Island, Whiteside, Carroll, Jo Daviess

Highway system
- Illinois State Highway System; Interstate; US; State; Tollways; Scenic
| ← IL 83 | → I-88 |
| ← I-80 | → IL 81 |

Illinois Route 84 (Route 84 or IL 84) is a long state highway that runs along the Mississippi River in northwestern Illinois. Illinois 84 runs from south of Green Rock (now Colona) at U.S. Route 6 to the Wisconsin state line at Highway 80 by Hazel Green, Wisconsin. Illinois 84 is 93.93 miles (151.17 km) long.

== Route description ==
Illinois Route 84 begins at an intersection with U.S. Route 6 (US 6) south of Colona in Henry County. From US 6, it heads north into the Green Rock neighborhood of Colona, crossing the Hennepin Canal on the south side of town. Colona and Green Rock were separate communities, but in 1997, became the first communities in Illinois to merge. Route 84 curves to the west, becomes a four-lane road, and crosses the Rock River into Rock Island County.

Near the TPC at Deere Run golf course, the route turns to the north towards Carbon Cliff. It curves gently to the northwest where it meets the Route 5 and Route 92 expressway at a partial cloverleaf interchange. Route 92 joins Route 84 and they travel together through Silvis for 1 1/2 miles (2.4 km) before Route 84 splits off to the north in East Moline.

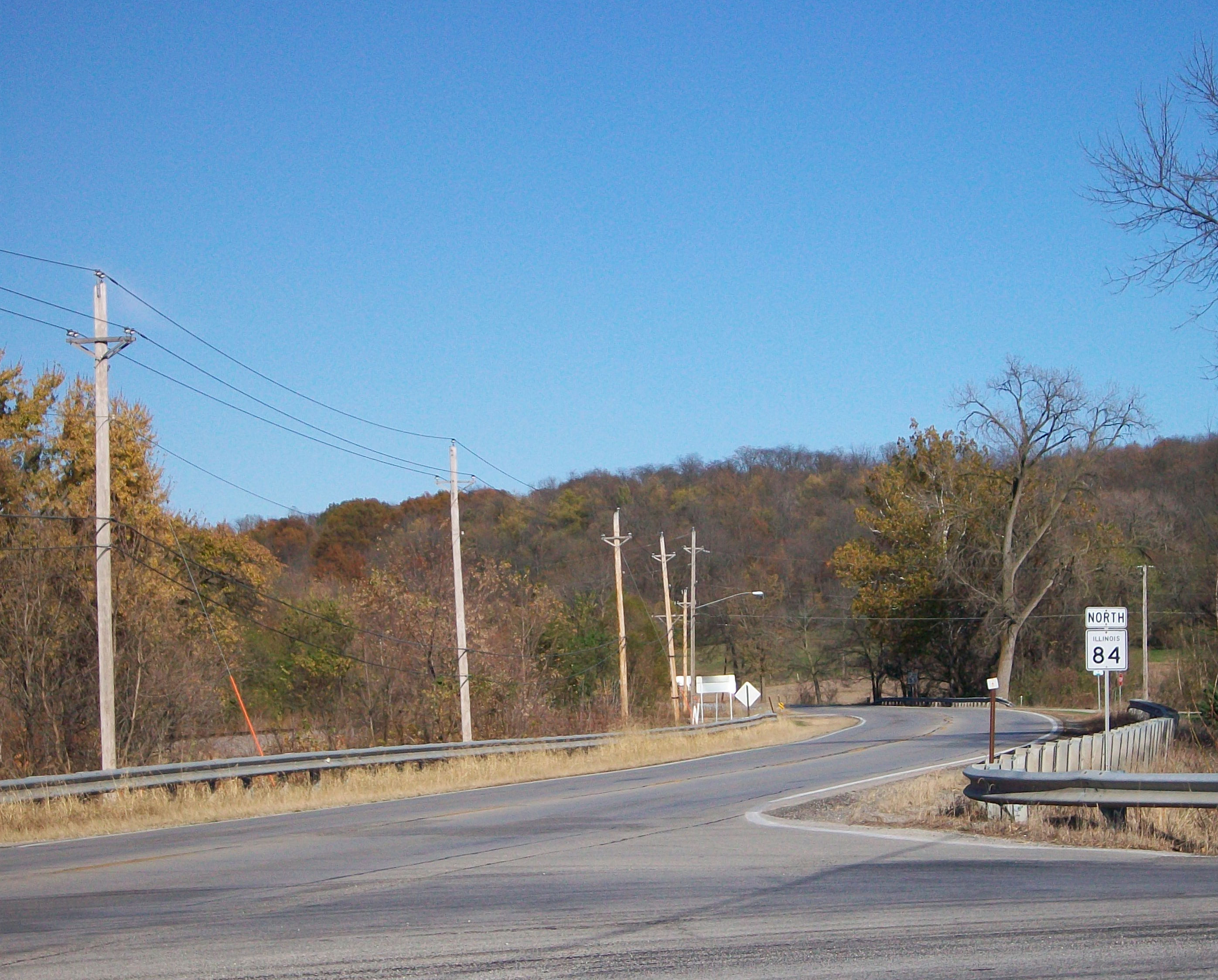
Route 84 near Rapids City

Continuing north, IL 84 is now following the Great River Road. It passes Campbell's Island and passes through Hampton. Southeast of Rapids City is the interchange with Interstate 80. Due to the proximity of the Mississippi River, the interchange is a partial cloverleaf, as a diamond interchange would extend over the river. The route follows the bend in the river north through Rapids City and Port Byron.

North of Port Byron, IL 84 travels to the north-northeast towards Cordova. Three miles (4.8 km) north of Cordova, the highway separates the Cordova Dragway Park to the east and the Quad Cities Nuclear Generating Station, operated by Constellation Energy, to the west. Between the nuclear plant and Albany lies a small industrial area bordered by the Mississippi River. Across the road lies irrigated crop land of Rock Island and Whiteside Counties.

== History ==
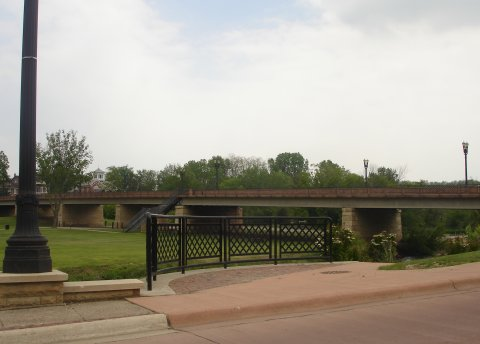
The bridge over the Galena River in Galena. This bridge is part of the Illinois Route 84 / U.S. Highway 20 route.

In 1924, SBI Route 84 was originally what is now Illinois Route 92, Illinois Route 192 and Illinois Route 94 from near Muscatine, Iowa to U.S. Route 67. This was dropped in 1939.

In 1955, Illinois 84 was applied on a former alignment of U.S. Route 6. In 1964, Illinois 84 arrived at its current terminus, replacing then Illinois Route 80 north to Galena due to construction of Interstate 80 through the Quad Cities.

== Major intersections ==
| County | Location | mi | km | Destinations | Notes |
|---|---|---|---|---|---|
| Henry | Colona Township | 0.0 | 0.0 | US 6 (Grand Army of the Republican Highway) – Geneseo, Moline | |
| Rock Island | Carbon Cliff | 5.3 | 8.5 | IL 5 / IL 92 east to I-80 / I-88 (Ronald Reagan Memorial Highway) – Sterling, Rock Falls | Interchange; southern end of IL 92 overlap |
| Rock Island | East Moline | 6.7 | 10.8 | IL 92 west / Great River Road (National Route) south (18th Avenue) – Moline, Rock Island | Northern end of IL 92 overlap; southern end of Great River Road overlap |
| Rock Island | Hampton Township | 12.6 | 20.3 | I-80 – Des Moines, Joliet | I-80 exit 1 |
| Whiteside | Fulton | 35.9 | 57.8 | US 30 – Clinton, IA, Morrison | |
| Whiteside | Fulton | 37.3 | 60.0 | Lincoln Highway west (16th Avenue) | Southern end of Lincoln Highway overlap |
| Whiteside | Fulton | 37.4 | 60.2 | IL 136 / Lincoln Highway east – Fulton, Clinton, IA | Northern end of Lincoln Highway overlap |
| Carroll | Savanna | 54.1 | 87.1 | US 52 east / IL 64 east | Southern end of US 52 / IL 64 overlap |
| Carroll | Savanna | 56.1 | 90.3 | US 52 west / IL 64 west (Savanna-Sabula Bridge) – Sabula | Northern end of US 52 / IL 64 overlap |
| Jo Daviess | Elizabeth Township | 74.4 | 119.7 | US 20 east (Ulysses S. Grant Memorial Highway) – Elizabeth, Stockton | Southern end of US 20 overlap |
| Jo Daviess | Rawlins Township | 89.7 | 144.4 | US 20 west (Ulysses S. Grant Memorial Highway) / Great River Road (National Route) north – Dubuque | Northern end of US 20 / Great River Road overlap |
| Jo Daviess | Vinegar Hill Township | 93.8 | 151.0 | WIS 80 north – Hazel Green | |
1.000 mi = 1.609 km; 1.000 km = 0.621 mi: Concurrency terminus
