= Illinois Route 5 =

State highway in Rock Island County, Illinois, United States

Illinois Route 5
- John Deere Road
- IL 5 highlighted in red

Route information
- Maintained by IDOT
- Length: 15.78 mi (25.40 km)
- Existed: 1972–present

Major junctions
- West end: US 67 in Rock Island
- I-74 / US 6 in Moline
- East end: I-80 / I-88 / IL 92 / IL 110 (CKC) in East Moline

Location
- Country: United States
- State: Illinois
- Counties: Rock Island

Highway system
- Illinois State Highway System; Interstate; US; State; Tollways; Scenic
← IL 4	→ US 6

Illinois Route 5 (IL 5) is a four to six lane state highway in Rock Island County, Illinois, United States, that runs from U.S. Route 67 (US 67) in Rock Island to the interchange of Interstate 80 (I-80) and the toll-free portion of I-88, a distance of 15.78 miles (25.40 km). IL 92 also continues eastbound on I-88.

== Route description ==
IL 5 is the main road on the north bank of the Rock River, serving the cities of Rock Island, Moline, Silvis, and Carbon Cliff.

IL 5 begins at US 67 (11th Street) in Rock Island, traveling eastward towards the Milan Beltway. At this point, it travels along the limited-access road and becomes John Deere Road. Continuing eastward in Moline, it then meets I-74/US 6 at a cloverleaf interchange. After leaving Moline, it serves the Black Hawk College and the John Deere World Headquarters. After this, the route begins to curve northward, and is known as John Deere Expressway for the rest of the route (although most signage along the rest of the route reads Illinois 5). In Carbon Cliff, the route meets IL 84 and IL 92 at a parclo. At this point, IL 92 follows along the rest of IL 5. Also, the road curves northeastward, and then eastward. Continuing east, they then meet I-80/IL 110 at a cloverleaf interchange. At this point, IL 5 transitions into I-88, effectively ending IL 5, while IL 92/IL 110 travels along I-88.

== History ==
SBI Route 5 originally ran from East Dubuque to Chicago, mostly along the current US 20. The portion that ran from Belvidere through Rockford is now known as Charles Street in Rockford, and was superseded by what is now the expressway extension of the US 20 Rockford Bypass to Belvidere.

In 1972, IL 5 was applied on former IL 190 (part of US 30 Toll before 1965). By 1975, IL 5 was extended to Rock Falls. By 1977, it extended towards IL 2 in Hillsdale. By 1979, IL 5 was extended all the way to US 67 in Rock Island, replacing part of IL 2 west of Sterling in the process. By 1989, the freeway/tollway portion of IL 5 was changed to I-88, while the rest of IL 5 in the Quad Cities remained.

== Major intersections ==
The entire route is in Rock Island County.

Location	mi	km	Destinations	Notes
Rock Island	0.00	0.00	Great River Road Spur west / US 67 (11th Street)	Western terminus; western end of Great River Road Spur concurrency; road continues as 46th Avenue
Rock Island	0.3	0.48	Great River Road Spur east (15th Street)	Eastern end of Great River Road Spur concurrency
Moline	2.5– 2.8	4.0– 4.5	Milan (Milan Beltway)	Interchange; counterclockwise terminus of Milan Bltwy.; state maintained
Moline	5.1	8.2	I-74 / US 6 – Davenport, Galesburg	Cloverleaf interchange; I-74 exit 4
Moline	5.6	9.0	38th Street	Right-in/right-out interchange; eastbound exit and entrance only for 38th St. south, westbound exit and entrance only for 38th St. north
Carbon Cliff	10.4	16.7	Colona Road to I-80	State maintained
Carbon Cliff	12.2	19.6	IL 84 / IL 92 west – Silvis, Carbon Cliff	Interchange; western end of IL 92 concurrency
Hampton Township	15.78	25.40	I-88 begins (Ronald Reagan Memorial Highway) / IL 92 east – Sterling, Rock Falls	Continuation beyond eastern terminus; eastern end of IL 92 concurrency
1.000 mi = 1.609 km; 1.000 km = 0.621 mi: Concurrency terminus; Incomplete access; Route transition
