= Interstate 494 Bridge =

Interstate 494 Bridge may refer to:

- I-494 Minnesota River Bridge, a bridge spanning the Minnesota River, built in 1982
- Wakota Bridge, a bridge spanning the Mississippi River, built in 2006
