= IL-5 =

IL 5 or IL-5 may refer to:

- Interleukin 5
- Illinois's 5th congressional district
- Illinois Route 5
