= Rock Island Swing Bridge =

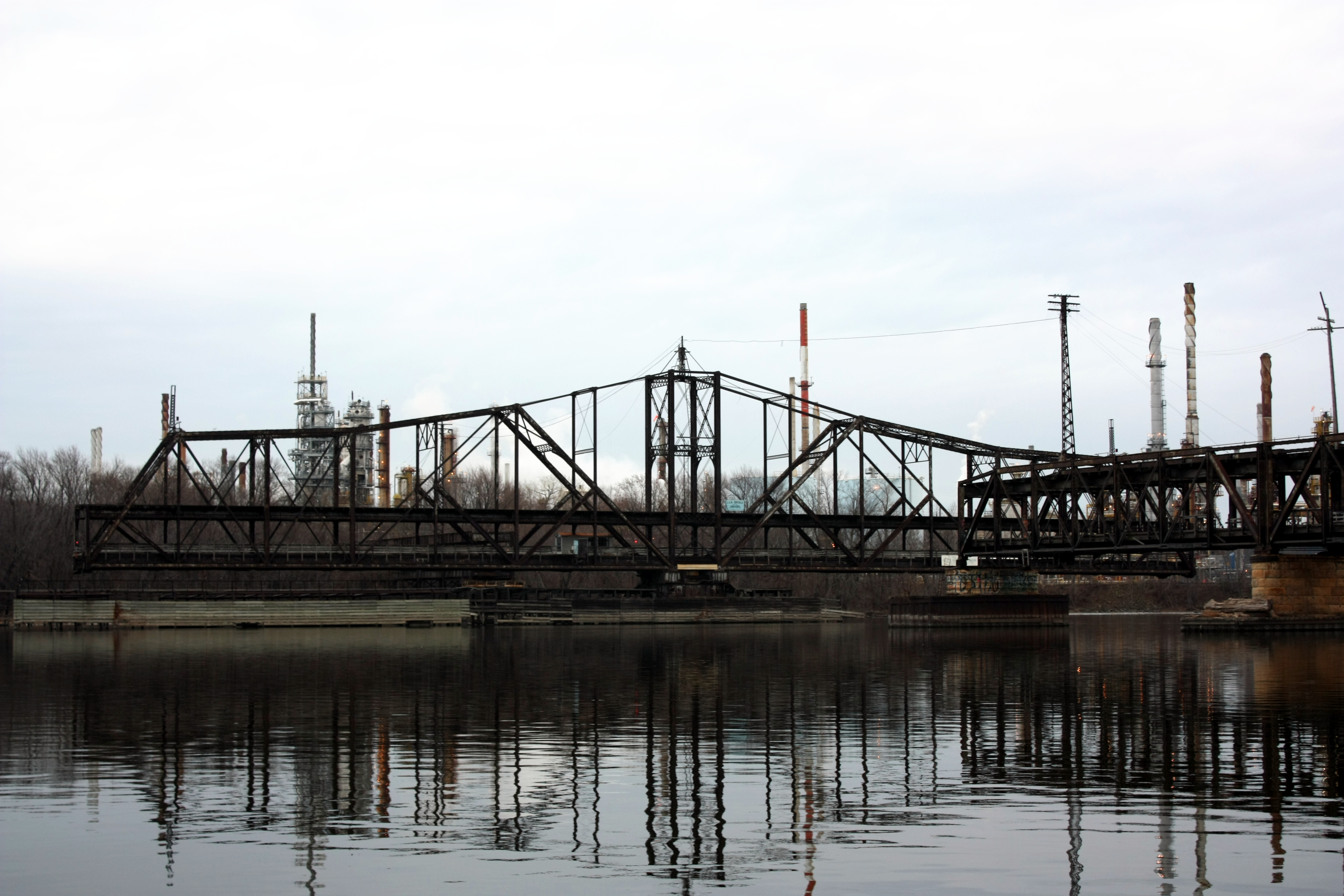
- The bridge in the open position, taken from the marina directly north of bridge.
- Coordinates: 44°51′12″N 93°00′32″W
- Carries: One and a half lanes of Washington CSAH 22, CSAH 38, and Dakota CSAH 24 and one railroad track
- Crosses: Mississippi River
- Locale: Inver Grove Heights, Minnesota, St. Paul Park, Minnesota
- Maintained by: Washington County, Minnesota, Dakota County, Minnesota
- ID number: 5600

Characteristics
- Design: Double-deck through-truss swing span
- Total length: 1,661 feet (506 m)
- Width: 18 feet (5.5 m)
- Longest span: 442 feet (135 m)
- Clearance below: 19 feet (5.8 m)

History
- Opened: 1895
- Closed: Closed to rail traffic in 1980; Closed to auto traffic in 1999; Partial Demolition in March–April 2009; Converted into a recreational pier (opening June 11, 2011)

Statistics
- Daily traffic: 3900 (in 1998 before closure)
- Toll: 75 cents (time of closure)

Location
- Interactive map of Rock Island Swing Bridge

The Rock Island Swing Bridge was a swing bridge that spanned the Mississippi River between Inver Grove Heights, Minnesota, and St. Paul Park, Minnesota. It was also known as the Newport Rail Bridge, as it had a spur to Newport, Minnesota, and J.A.R. bridge, after previous owners Joan and Al Roman of Chicago. It was one of the few double-decker bridges on the Mississippi, with the top level formerly used for railroad traffic and the bottom level formerly used as a road crossing. It also was one of a few toll bridges in Minnesota, and one of the last remaining ones. It closed to rail traffic in 1980, and road traffic in 1999, when the toll was 75 cents. After closing, the bridge sat dormant in the open position for 10 years before being partially demolished in 2009. It was converted into a recreational pier, which was open to the public on June 11, 2011.

== History ==
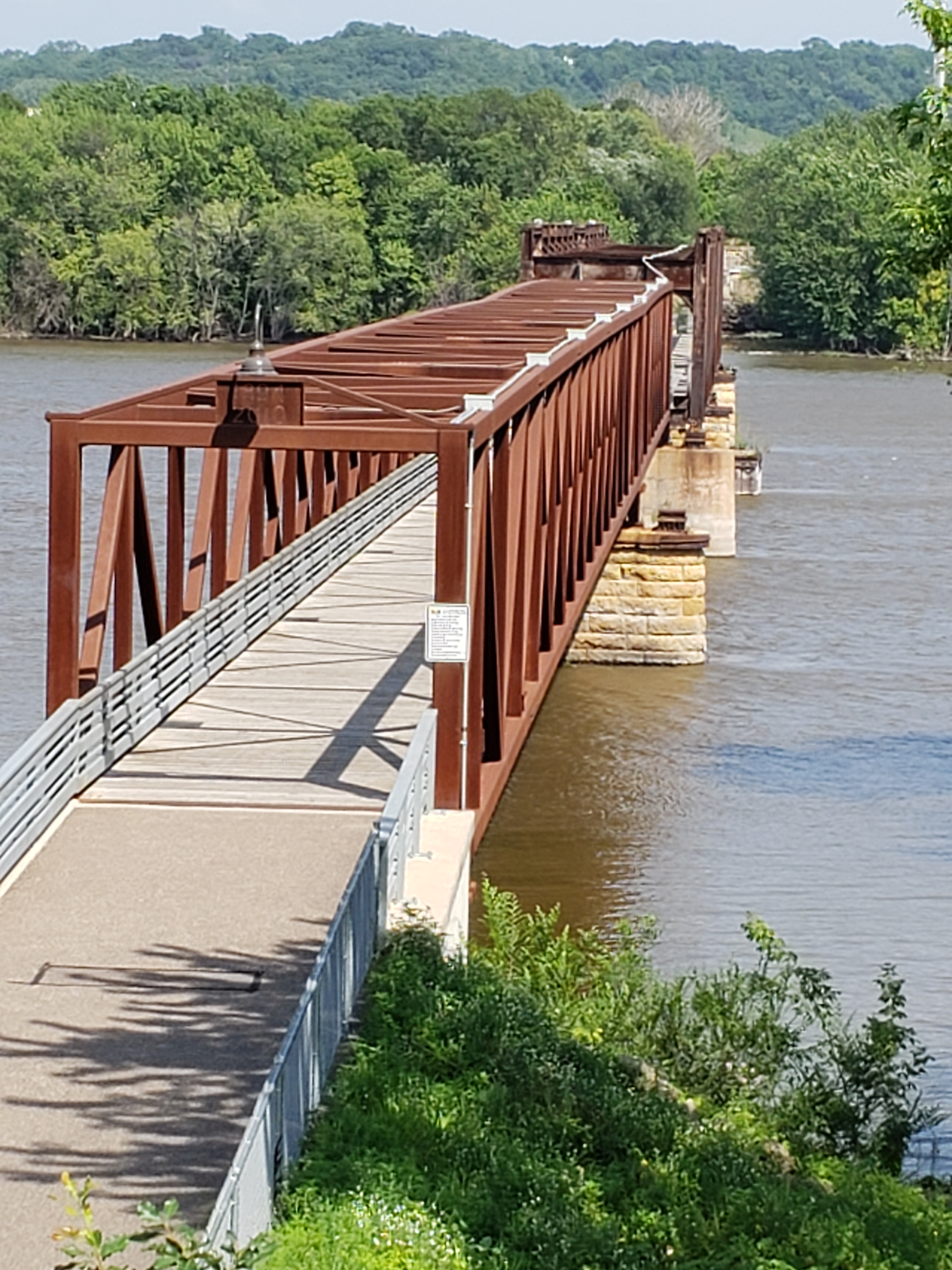
Swing Bridge Park in 2019

The bridge was built in 1895 for the South St. Paul Beltline Railroad by the Pittsburgh Bridge Company. Originally, it connected stockyards in nearby South St. Paul, Minnesota, to the mail rail lines of the Chicago, Burlington, and Quincy, and Milwaukee Road that ran on the east bank of the Mississippi River in Washington County, Minnesota.

The bridge was formerly owned by the Chicago, Rock Island and Pacific Railroad until that line went bankrupt in 1980, first as a toll bridge until 1938, then as a free bridge. After that, local automotive traffic had to detour 7.5 miles (12.1 km) north to the Wakota Bridge or 18 miles (29 km) south to the Hastings High Bridge. Until the first Wakota Bridge was built in 1959, it was the only Mississippi crossing between Downtown St. Paul and Hastings, Minnesota.

There is some evidence that gangster John Dillinger fled across the bridge into Inver Grove Heights after a running gun battle with Dakota County deputies in Newport and St. Paul Park.

Al Roman of Chicago bought the bridge and reopened it in 1982. This required special legislation for an individual to own a bridge, and it became one of the few toll bridges in Minnesota. In 1999, an inspection revealed that the bridge had a bad beam, and it was permanently closed to automobile traffic. The estimated replacement cost was at least $11 million. J.A.R Bridge, Inc., eventually requested that Washington County help fund a thorough inspection, in hopes that a buyer could be found. Washington County was not receptive to the idea, however, feeling that the bridge was so old that there was no point putting any more money into it — if there was a need for a crossing in the area, they should look at building a new one. At that point, Roman owed $6500 in back taxes; with no prospect of being able to reopen, he stopped paying taxes altogether and the bridge was seized. Washington County was given management of the bridge in 2003.

As of June 2006, Washington County, Minnesota, officials had contemplated the removal of the bridge. County engineer Don Theisen called the bridge "a rusty bucket of bolts" and said that it had been impeding barge traffic. Estimated removal costs were said to be $5 million.

The eastern span was adjacent to a large Marathon Oil refinery in Saint Paul Park. Washington County turned the eastern approach road over to the refinery, and it was soon blocked off. With the local construction of the Wakota Bridge project in Saint Paul Park and Newport, Washington County Roads 22 and 38 had their paths changed and now no longer approach the bridge. The local roads have also been changed, and gates now block the former streets leading to the area. There was the possibility of using part of the western fixed span as a pedestrian outlook of the river as it is near a proposed park, and public tours of the western span were held on October 25, 2008, to bring awareness to this issue.

The bridge was set for demolition in Winter 2009/2010. However, on November 24, 2008, all access to the bridge was prohibited, after a 200-foot segment of the eastern span collapsed onto the riverbank.

Within two months of the collapse on the eastern span, a contractor was quickly found to demolish it. Demolition of the bridge began on March 3, 2009. As it had already collapsed and in order to end the refinery's hassle of dealing with trespassers, the eastern span was quickly removed. Following the demolition of the eastern span, the swing span of the bridge was briefly closed for a few days, marking the first time in 10 years it was closed. During the months of March and April, the swing span was slowly demolished, then most of the western span, leaving only the bridge-closing mechanism in the river. By the end of April, only two sections of the western span near the center of the river remained.

Last-ditch efforts began to save as much of the bridge as possible. In May 2009 a moratorium was put into effect prohibiting further demolition until May 2011.

After numerous fundraiser activities and other efforts to save the bridge, the remaining sections were to be turned into a recreational pier and the land around the bridge into a park. The completed project was planned to open in November 2010, but flooding halted work on the project.

Work was again put on hold on November 4, 2010 when the remaining two spans of the original bridge caught on fire, destroying the wood on the bridge. It took three and a half hours to put the fire out due to windy conditions. It was later revealed that sparks from welding caused the old railroad ties on the bridge to ignite and start a fire. The deck of the bridge was heavily damaged, but according to a few news reports the original steel structure was said to still be structurally sound.

Restoration work on the bridge resumed on November 8, 2010. The old decks of the bridge were removed and replaced with new ones. Despite the obstacles, a ribbon cutting ceremony was held on June 8, 2011 and the new pier and park opened to the public on June 11, 2011.

== See also ==
- List of crossings of the Upper Mississippi River
