= Plymouth Avenue Bridge =

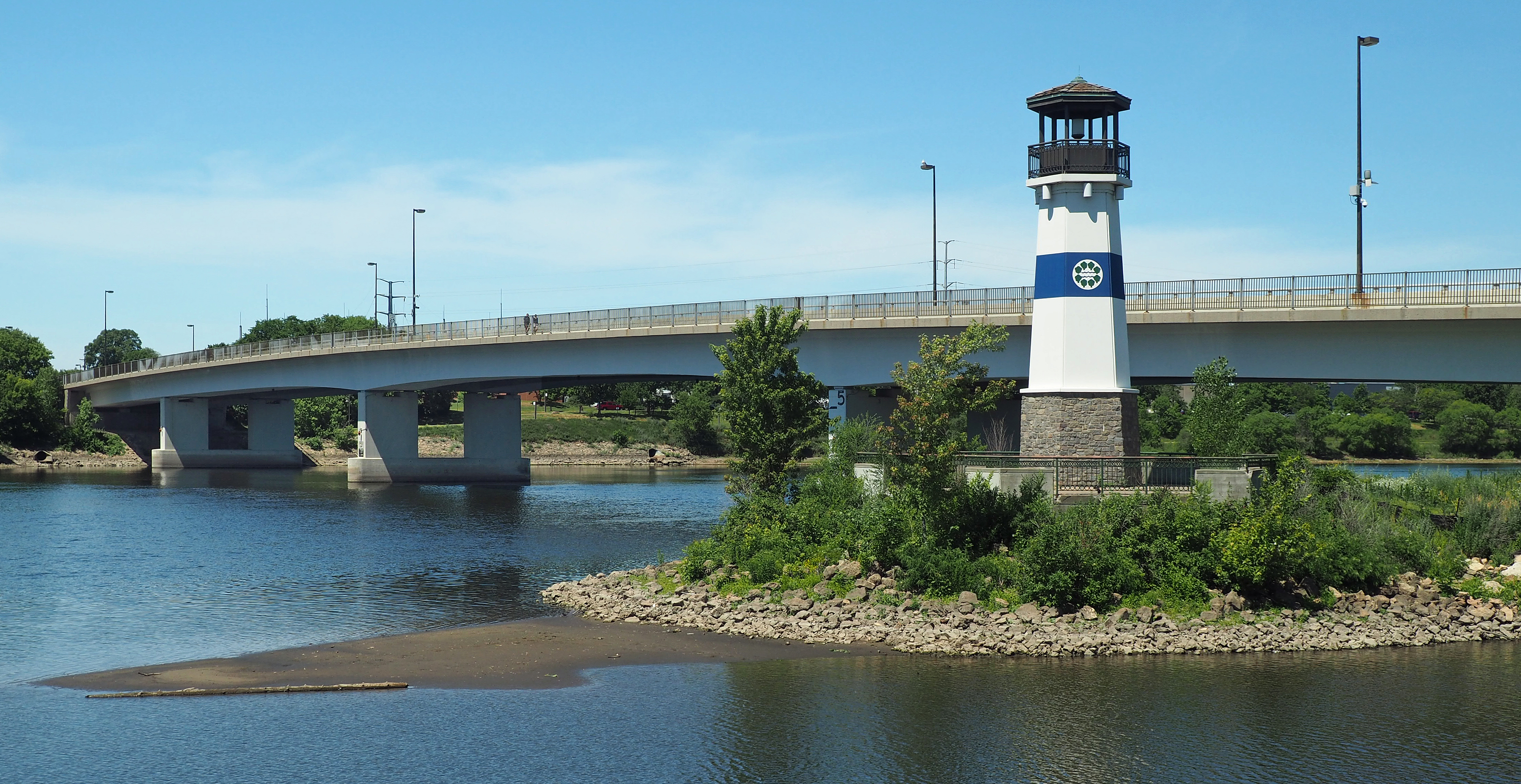
- Plymouth Avenue Bridge and the Boom Island Lighthouse
- Coordinates: 44°59′35″N 93°16′23″W
- Carries: Two lanes of Plymouth Avenue and two buffered bike lanes
- Crosses: Mississippi River
- Locale: Minneapolis, Minnesota
- Maintained by: City of Minneapolis
- ID number: 27611

Characteristics
- Design: Four-span segmental bridge
- Total length: 943 feet
- Width: 55 feet
- Longest span: 140 feet
- Clearance below: 25 feet

History
- Opened: 1983

The Plymouth Avenue Bridge is a segmental bridge that spans the Mississippi River in Minneapolis. It was built in 1983 and was designed by Van Doren-Hazard-Stallings. The construction of this bridge was unique, for it was the first segmental concrete girder bridge built in Minnesota. This method of design uses a "form traveler" that shapes the concrete as it is built out from the piers. This avoided the use of falsework and avoided impeding river traffic. The concrete is also engineered to be salt-resistant by the use of post-tensioning. Tubes run through the concrete structure carrying strands of cable. With tension on the cables, the structure is designed to be under compression. This prevents cracks and hinders the intrusion of salt water. Since then, other bridges in Minnesota have used this construction method, including the I-35W Saint Anthony Falls Bridge in Minneapolis, the Wabasha Street Bridge in downtown St. Paul, and the Wakota Bridge in South St. Paul.

The original bridge at this location was a wooden Howe truss design, built in 1873. It was built when Minneapolis, then only on the west side of the river, consolidated with the city of St. Anthony, on the east side of the river. As part of the merger, Minneapolis agreed to build two bridges, one upstream of the Hennepin Avenue Bridge and one downstream. That bridge was replaced in 1886 with an iron truss bridge. It was remodeled in 1913 and then raised in 1953 for more clearance. The bridge was closed in 1981 because the floor beams were deteriorated by corrosion over the years. The current bridge was constructed two years later.

On Friday, October 22, 2010, the Plymouth Avenue Bridge was closed indefinitely "as a precaution, pending further investigation after a routine inspection discovered corrosion on cables that run through the bridge." The bridge was reopened to foot traffic on Thursday, January 6, 2011, after engineers determined that the bridge was safe for pedestrian and bicycle use. Use by vehicular traffic was not allowed until corroded cables could be replaced, a project that, following several delays, was completed as of August 9, 2013.
