= Great River Road Bridge =

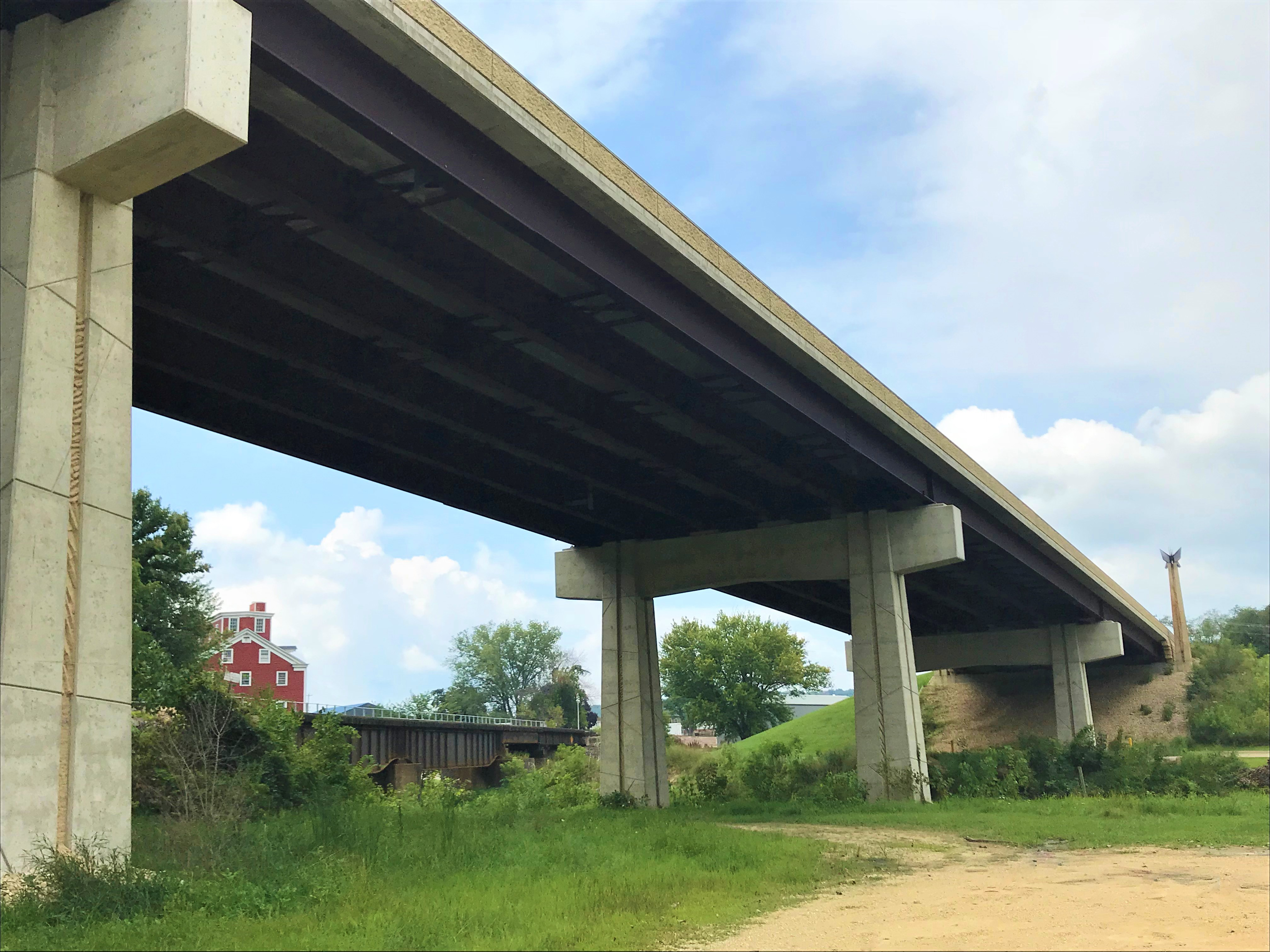
- The Great River Road Bridge from below in August 2018 (Note historic Potter's Mill in the background)
- Coordinates: 42°15′2″N 90°25′8.3″W
- Carries: 2 lanes of US 52
- Crosses: Mill Creek (near the confluence of the Mississippi River) and a Canadian Pacific rail line
- Locale: Southern limit of Bellevue, Iowa

Characteristics
- Design: Steel girder bridge
- Total length: 657 feet (200 m)
- Width: 52 feet (16 m)
- Longest span: 115 feet (35 m)
- No. of spans: 6
- No. of lanes: 2 (with additional 12 foot pedestrian lane)

History
- Opened: 2009

Statistics
- Daily traffic: 2,430 (2017)

The Great River Road Bridge, officially known as US 52 over CP RR/Mill Creek, and often called Mill Creek Overpass, or the South Bellevue Bridge, is steel girder bridge that carries U.S. Highway 52 (US 52) across Mill Creek (near its confluence with the Mississippi River and connects Bellevue and southern Jackson County, Iowa, (including the city of Sabula on US 52). It is located near the southern city limit of Bellevue.

Built as a replacement for an aging and no longer sufficient former bridge built in 1941, the new bridge started construction in late 2007. With the completion of the Great River Road Bridge in late 2009, the existing bridge was demolished. The modern structure is applauded for its sensitivity in design for its scenic natural surroundings (including the Mississippi River, Bellevue State Park, and the high limestone bluffs that tower above). Built with a two-lane 40-foot driving deck, it also provides a 12-foot bike and pedestrian lane on its western side. The bridge also crosses a Canadian Pacific rail line that travels through Bellevue parallel to US 52. In 2017, its average daily traffic was 2,430 vehicles, with 7% of that being truck traffic.
