= Norbert F. Beckey Bridge =

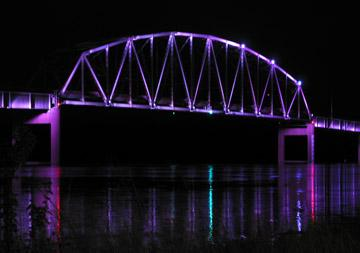
- Coordinates: 41°25′21″N 91°02′01″W
- Carries: Iowa 92 / IL 92
- Crosses: Mississippi River
- Locale: Muscatine, Iowa and Illinois, U.S. River Mile 455.90
- Other name(s): Beckey Bridge, High Bridge
- Maintained by: Iowa Department of Transportation
- ID number: NBI 000000000038201

Characteristics
- Design: Steel girder with single truss through deck
- Total length: 3,018 ft (920 m)
- Width: 32 ft (9.8 m); 2 lanes
- Clearance below: 500 Feet Navigable channel

History
- Opened: December 2, 1972; 53 years ago

Statistics
- Daily traffic: 4,150

Location
- Interactive map of Norbert F. Beckey Bridge

The Norbert F. Beckey Bridge carries Iowa Highway 92 and Illinois Route 92 across the Mississippi River between Muscatine, Iowa and Rock Island County, Illinois, United States.

== History ==
Muscatine High Bridge (1891-1972) collapsed twice in its 65-year history. The wooden bridge was originally built in 1891. The $150,000 construction cost was provided by private funds who charged a toll for crossing the bridge.

In 1899, the bridge inexplicably collapsed. A crew of men and a team of horses pulling a load of logs heading from Illinois to Iowa fell with the bridge down 40 feet into the frigid waters of the Mississippi. It is not clear from historical records if there were any survivors.

The second collapse occurred around 1 a.m. on June 1, 1956 after a 22-year-old Muscatine man, Duane Allen Chelf, crashed his vehicle into the bridge at high speed in his efforts to elude police. The damage caused a support truss failure and collapse.

"[Duane Allen Chelf] hit a wooden bridge railing, knocking it loose and then smashed into a girder, forcing his car to land on its side. Traffic was stopped from both directions and a wrecker came to remove the car. As traffic began to move again about 2:25 a.m., the second span from the Illinois side of the bridge gave way and fell into the water below. The scene fell to total blackness in the dead of the night because the span collapse severed the bridge lighting. At the sight, rescuers initially could not figure out what had happened to the truck because it could not be seen." The High Bridge was repaired but was severely weight restricted for the rest of is life and closed with the opening of the new bridge.

The Norbert F. Beckey Bridge replaced the Muscatine High Bridge (1891-1972). Construction on the bridge was completed in December 1972. A pillar from the old High Bridge still stands at Riverside Park in Muscatine.

In 1956 the newly established Muscatine Bridge Commission was able to purchase the High Bridge for just over $880,000.

Muscatine Bridge Commission member, Norbert Beckey (1921–81), worked tirelessly to ensure that a new, safer bridge could be constructed to replace the wooden High Bridge.

The new bridge was built a mile upstream from its predecessor, and the first construct in Iowa under the Iowa Interstate Bridge Act.

The new bridge, which cost $5.2 million to construct, was opened on December 8, 1972. It was rededicated and named after Beckey on September 15, 1980. Beckey (1921-1981) was the last Chairman of the MBC.

In 2012, 43 light-emitting diode (LED) fixtures built by Musco Sports Lighting were attached to the bridge. The system is believed to be the first of its kind to be installed on a bridge over the Mississippi river. The computer controlled lights can generate 16.7 million color combinations. Muscatine Power & Water maintains the fixtures and manages the light shows.

== Gallery ==
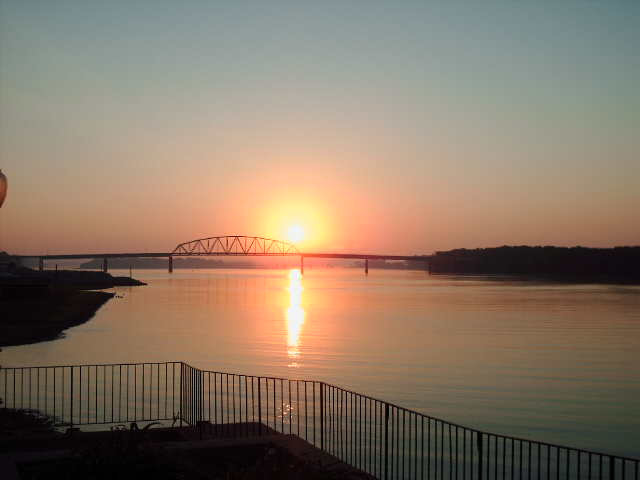
Sunrise over the Mississippi River

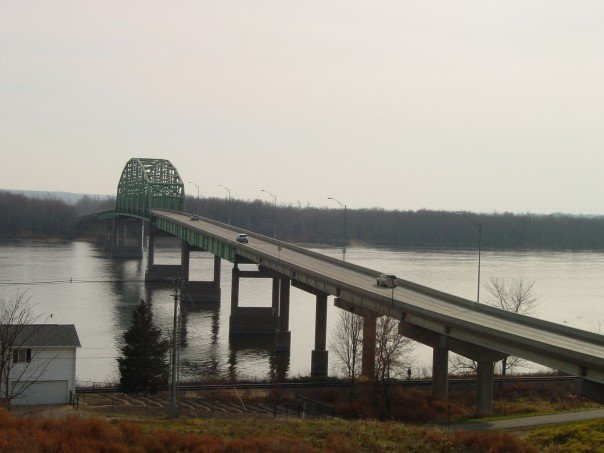

== See also ==
- List of crossings of the Upper Mississippi River
