= Andrusia Lake =

Lake in the state of Minnesota, United States

- Location within Minnesota
- Location: Beltrami County, Minnesota
- Coordinates: 47°27′21″N 94°39′27″W
- Type: lake

Andrusia Lake is a lake in Beltrami County, Minnesota, in the United States.

Andrusia Lake was named for Andrew Jackson, 7th President of the United States.

Andrusia Lake hosts multiple resorts and a public boat launch on the north end, some of these resorts include: Joe's Lodge, Fin 'n Feather, Morning Star, and Birchwood Estates.

The Lake is known for its fishing, which includes Walleye, northern pike, and yellow perch.

== See also ==
- List of lakes in Minnesota
