= Carbon Cliff, Illinois =

Carbon Cliff
- Village
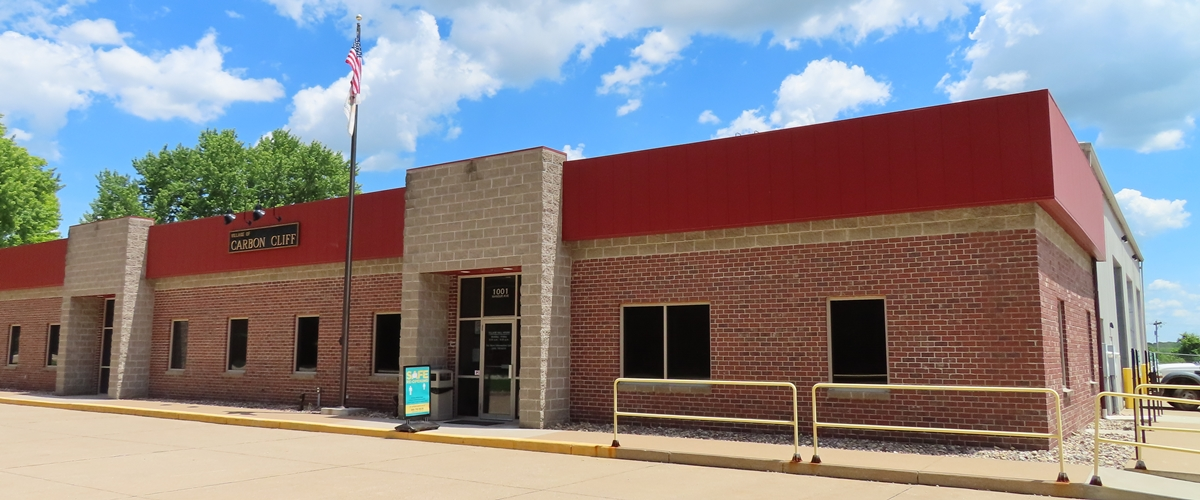
- Village hall

- Location of Carbon Cliff in Rock Island County, Illinois.

- Location of Illinois in the United States
- Coordinates: 41°29′50″N 90°23′12″W
- Country: United States
- State: Illinois
- County: Rock Island

Area
  - Total: 2.10 sq mi (5.43 km^{2})
  - Land: 2.10 sq mi (5.43 km^{2})
  - Water: 0 sq mi (0.00 km^{2})
- Elevation: 620 ft (190 m)

Population (2020)
  - Total: 1,846
  - Density: 881.0/sq mi (340.16/km^{2})
- Time zone: UTC-6 (CST)
  - Summer (DST): UTC-5 (CDT)
- ZIP code: 61239
- Area code: 309
- FIPS code: 17-11150
- GNIS feature ID: 2397550
- Website: carboncliff.gov

Carbon Cliff is a village in Rock Island County, Illinois, United States. The population was 1,846 at the 2020 census, down from 2,134 at the 2010 census. It lies in the south part of Hampton Township.

== History ==
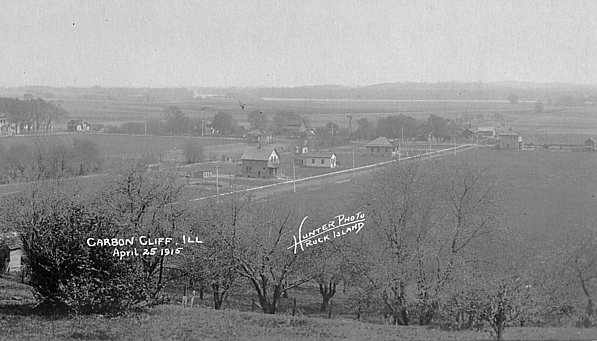
Carbon Cliff, 1915

The Chicago and Rock Island railroad (later the Chicago, Rock Island & Pacific) reached Carbon Cliff in 1854. By the mid-19th century, Carbon Cliff had become a coal mining center, and was named for the many coal mines that dotted the bluff west of town. The Carbon Cliff mines were the earliest worked on the west side of the Rock River. Stoehr & Schadt Coal Co and others mined extensively for many years, but by the beginning of the 20th century the limited supply of coal was nearly exhausted and mining there was discontinued.

On November 13, 1906, voters of Hampton Township petitioned the county court for permission to incorporate as a village. The citizens voted and with 55 to 28 in favor, Carbon Cliff was incorporated on December 8, 1906.

The Carbon Cliff bluffs were also known as an excellent source of clay. The Argillo Works was formed in 1865 to produce fire brick and farm-drain tile. Argillo's products were sold throughout the country and was one of the leading industries of Rock Island County. In the 1930s, fire destroyed the plant's offices and buildings and the firm went out of business.

From Economical Geology of Illinois, a geological survey by Illinois State Geologist A. H. Worthen, published 1882:

The best [pottery establishment] perhaps, in this part of the state, is located at Carbon Cliff, within a few yards of the railroad station of the same name. Many years ago a company was formed for the purpose of mining coal in the Carbon Cliff bluffs. The company operated the mines, with varying success, until the coal practically became exhausted. The fine strata of potter's clay outcropping all along the exhausted coal seam then attracted attention. A pottery was started... the buildings are of brick, the principal one is similar to a large railroad round house, with a towering smoke stack in the center. Around this has sprung up a little village, dependant for existence upon this single manufactory."

== Geography ==
According to the 2010 census, Carbon Cliff has a total area of 2.05 square miles (5.31 km^{2}), all land.

== Demographics ==
Historical population
Census	Pop.	Note	%±
1880	170		—
1910	366		—
1920	400		9.3%
1930	494		23.5%
1940	575		16.4%
1950	676		17.6%
1960	1,268		87.6%
1970	1,369		8.0%
1980	1,578		15.3%
1990	1,492		−5.4%
2000	1,689		13.2%
2010	2,134		26.3%
2020	1,846		−13.5%
Decemial US Census

=== Racial and ethnic composition ===
Carbon Cliff village, Illinois – Racial and ethnic composition Note: the US Census treats Hispanic/Latino as an ethnic category. This table excludes Latinos from the racial categories and assigns them to a separate category. Hispanics/Latinos may be of any race.
Race / Ethnicity (NH = Non-Hispanic)	Pop 2000	Pop 2010	Pop 2020	% 2000	% 2010	% 2020
White alone (NH)	1,468	1,579	1,204	86.92%	73.99%	65.22%
Black or African American alone (NH)	75	254	299	4.44%	11.90%	16.20%
Native American or Alaska Native alone (NH)	5	6	6	0.30%	0.28%	0.33%
Asian alone (NH)	8	13	11	0.47%	0.61%	0.60%
Native Hawaiian or Pacific Islander alone (NH)	0	1	2	0.00%	0.05%	0.11%
Other race alone (NH)	0	1	7	0.00%	0.05%	0.38%
Mixed race or Multiracial (NH)	35	66	92	2.07%	3.09%	4.98%
Hispanic or Latino (any race)	98	214	225	5.80%	10.03%	12.19%
Total	1,689	2,134	1,846	100.00%	100.00%	100.00%

=== 2020 census ===
As of the 2020 census, Carbon Cliff had a population of 1,846. The median age was 33.9 years. 28.3% of residents were under the age of 18 and 15.0% of residents were 65 years of age or older. For every 100 females there were 93.5 males, and for every 100 females age 18 and over there were 90.6 males age 18 and over.

93.3% of residents lived in urban areas, while 6.7% lived in rural areas.

There were 771 households in Carbon Cliff, of which 34.0% had children under the age of 18 living in them. Of all households, 39.2% were married-couple households, 20.1% were households with a male householder and no spouse or partner present, and 33.2% were households with a female householder and no spouse or partner present. About 30.9% of all households were made up of individuals and 13.3% had someone living alone who was 65 years of age or older.

There were 856 housing units, of which 9.9% were vacant. The homeowner vacancy rate was 2.4% and the rental vacancy rate was 13.3%.

=== 2000 census ===
As of the census of 2000, there were 1,689 people, 683 households, and 454 families residing in the village. The population density was 827.4 inhabitants per square mile (319.5/km^{2}). There were 723 housing units at an average density of 354.2 per square mile (136.8/km^{2}). The racial makeup of the village was 90.70% White, 4.50% African American, 0.47% Native American, 0.47% Asian, 1.18% from other races, and 2.66% from two or more races. Hispanic or Latino of any race were 5.80% of the population.

There were 683 households, out of which 32.7% had children under the age of 18 living with them, 48.6% were married couples living together, 12.7% had a female householder with no husband present, and 33.5% were non-families. 26.1% of all households were made up of individuals, and 7.8% had someone living alone who was 65 years of age or older. The average household size was 2.43 and the average family size was 2.92.

In the village, the population was spread out, with 26.6% under the age of 18, 10.5% from 18 to 24, 29.1% from 25 to 44, 23.1% from 45 to 64, and 10.8% who were 65 years of age or older. The median age was 35 years. For every 100 females, there were 95.3 males. For every 100 females age 18 and over, there were 91.1 males.

The median income for a household in the village was $35,921, and the median income for a family was $41,429. Males had a median income of $33,750 versus $22,083 for females. The per capita income for the village was $16,998. About 10.2% of families and 12.0% of the population were below the poverty line, including 16.3% of those under age 18 and 0.6% of those age 65 or over.

== Transportation ==
Quad Cities MetroLINK provides bus service on multiple routes connecting Carbon Cliff to destinations across the Quad Cities.

== Education ==
Portions of Carbon Cliff are divided between three elementary school districts: Carbon Cliff-Barstow School District 36, Silvis School District 34, and East Moline School District 37. All of it is in the United Township High School District 30.

== Notable people ==
- Jude Cole, singer-songwriter, record producer and manager
