= Wakota Bridge =

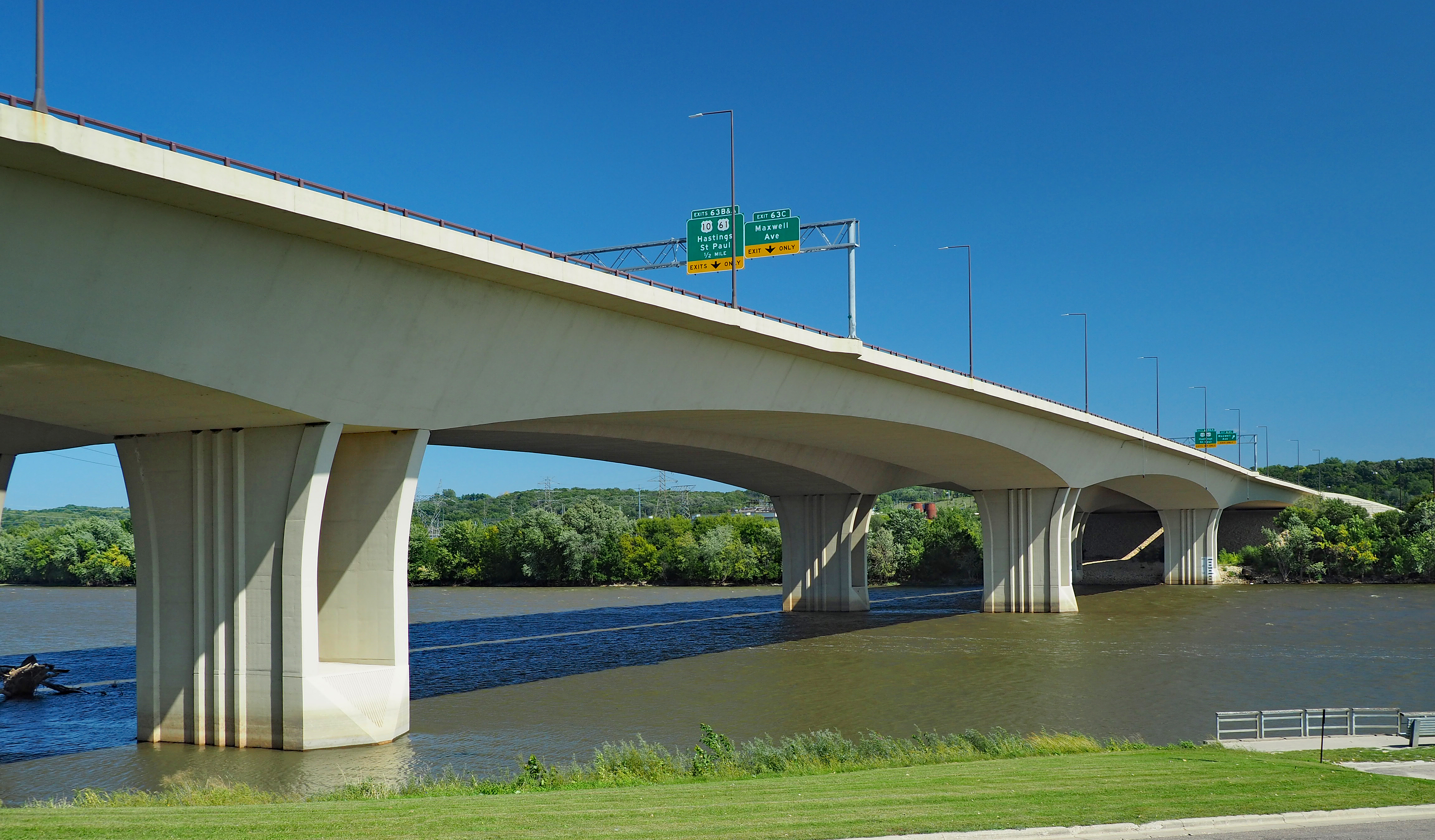
- The Wakota Bridge viewed from the southwest
- Coordinates: 44°52′59″N 93°00′54″W
- Carries: Five lanes in each direction of I-494.
- Crosses: Mississippi River
- Locale: South St. Paul, Minnesota-Newport, Minnesota
- Maintained by: Minnesota Department of Transportation

Characteristics
- Design: segmental bridge
- Total length: 1889 feet
- Longest span: 466 feet
- Clearance below: 64 feet

History
- Opened: 2006 (westbound); 2010 (eastbound)

Location
- Interactive map of Wakota Bridge

The Wakota Bridge is a ten-lane bridge carrying Interstate 494 over the Mississippi River between South St. Paul and Newport, Minnesota, United States. It was completed in 2010, replacing a four-lane span built in 1959. The name was given to the previous span in the early 1960s, and is derived from the two counties it connects, Washington and Dakota. Lunda Construction Company won the bid to build a new five-lane west-bound span, remove the existing bridge, and build a new five-lane east-bound span, which was completed in 2010. It is the widest bridge in Minnesota in number of lanes, along with the I-35W Saint Anthony Falls Bridge in Minneapolis.

== Planning for the new bridge ==
With two lanes in each direction, the old bridge was originally designed as a part of the Minnesota State Highway 100 beltway around the Twin Cities, and did not meet interstate highway standards. The lack of a third lane in each direction or shoulders on the bridge, as well as a lack of acceleration lanes from entrances on either side of the bridge, created traffic bottlenecks exacerbated by heavy truck traffic on the ramps leading to the bridge. Traffic was so bad that there was a market for an alternative, the toll Rock Island Swing Bridge a few miles to the south. Planning for a new structure began in the early 1990s. In 1994, the Minnesota Legislature passed a law mandating that toll financing be considered for projects above $10 million, and July 1995 solicited proposals for privately financed toll facilities. There was general lack of enthusiasm among the municipalities for getting stuck with a toll bridge just to get the project done a few years earlier, and ultimately Mn/DOT chose the Minnesota State Highway 312 project to consider as a toll facility instead. The original plans were to build a pair of four lane bridges, but a fifth lane in each direction was added early in the design process. Besides the actual Wakota Bridge, the project included rebuilding and converting to freeway a section of US Highway 10 / US Highway 61, and rebuilding a section of Interstate 494. Construction began in 2003.

== Construction difficulties ==
The discovery of hairline fractures by a third-party inspector in mid-2005 delayed the west-bound span's opening by a year. The fractures were not believed to be a safety hazard, however it was thought that the degraded quality would diminish the expected 100-year effective life of the bridge by allowing salt and water to seep in. Investigation revealed that at the time the bridge was designed, there were no published standards for how much load the concrete components could support. Assumptions were made that turned out to be incorrect. The existing bridge was retrofitted by adding post-tensioned steel cables to transfer more of the load to the piers. The design firm took responsibility for the $14.8 million cost to fix the problem and redesigned the future eastbound span. The new westbound span bridge was finished and opened to two-way traffic in the summer of 2006. Originally there were 3 eastbound lanes (to allow traffic room to decelerate for a 20 mph (32 km/h) curve on an exit ramp) and two westbound lanes, but due to traffic backups it was soon modified to add a third westbound lane. With all traffic using the new bridge, the demolition of the old Wakota bridge could begin as at the end of the barge shipping season. Meanwhile, negotiations began with the contractor about costs and scheduling related to the changes to the future eastbound span.

On December 29, 2006 the Lunda Construction Company was discharged from its contract to complete the new eastbound span, due to disagreements between the company and Mn/DOT about delays and cost overruns due to poor design and construction quality. Mn/DOT announced the eastbound span would be repackaged and rebid, and it was ultimately awarded back to Lunda Construction.

== Completion ==
The bid for the eastbound bridge was let on January 25, 2008. The winner was Lunda Construction, with a bid in excess of a million dollars over what their original offer was to Mn/DOT. On July 1, 2010, the eastbound span of the new Wakota Bridge opened. All five lanes are open on each bridge.

== The old Wakota Bridge ==
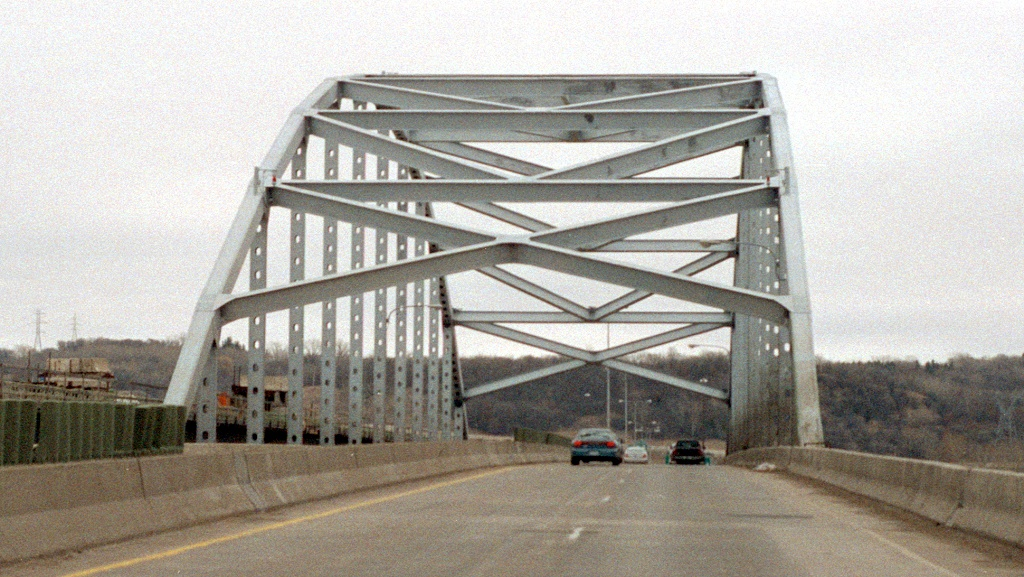
The 1959 bridge, looking east

The previous bridge at this location was the first of only three major tied-arch bridges to be constructed in Minnesota (the others were Cedar Avenue Bridge and the Bong Bridge, both built in the early 1980s.) The old Wakota Bridge was built using material fabricated by the United States Steel Corporation as one of the first segments of Interstate 494 by Ashbach Construction. Overseen by the company's General Superintendent Frank Kath, the bridge was constructed with one of the first known vibrating concrete slip forms built by him (during the paving of Highway 1 from Tower to Ely, MN) and used to construct a multitude of bridges throughout Minnesota. The bridge was dismantled in the fall of 2006 in order to make way for the future eastbound bridge. Temporary piers were built, then the old bridge was cut into manageable pieces which were lowered to waiting barges and hauled away.

== See also ==
- List of crossings of the Upper Mississippi River
