= Hampton Township, Rock Island County, Illinois =

Coordinates: 41°31′47″N 90°22′43″W

Hampton Township
- Township
- Location in Rock Island County

- Rock Island County's location in Illinois
- Country: United States
- State: Illinois
- County: Rock Island
- Established: November 4, 1856

Area
  - Total: 36.48 sq mi (94.5 km^{2})
  - Land: 34.14 sq mi (88.4 km^{2})
  - Water: 2.34 sq mi (6.1 km^{2}) 6.41%

Population (2010)
  - Estimate (2016): 21,463
  - Density: 636/sq mi (246/km^{2})
- Time zone: UTC-6 (CST)
  - Summer (DST): UTC-5 (CDT)
- FIPS code: 17-161-32577

Hampton Township is located in Rock Island County, Illinois. As of the 2010 census, its population was 21,711 and it contained 9,119 housing units. It contains the census-designated place of Campbell's Island.

== Early history ==
The first recorded birth in Hampton Township was Mary Ann McNeal, daughter of Mr. and Mrs. Henry McNeal, born Oct. 5, 1832.

The first recorded death occurred in 1829 on board the steamer Josephine. A woman from England was on her way to Galena to visit her son, and died just as the boat was landing. She was buried in Hampton.

In 1833 the first school in the township was established in a log cabin which had previously been used as a dwelling.

== Geography ==
According to the 2010 census, the township has a total area of 36.48 square miles (94.5 km^{2}), of which 34.14 square miles (88.4 km^{2}) (or 93.59%) is land and 2.34 square miles (6.1 km^{2}) (or 6.41%) is water.

== Demographics ==
Historical population
Census	Pop.	Note	%±
2016 (est.)	21,463
U.S. Decennial Census
