= 2018 Minnesota elections =

2018 Minnesota general election
- November 6, 2018
- Turnout: 64.25%

A general election was held in the U.S. state of Minnesota on November 6, 2018. All of Minnesota's executive officers were up for election as well as all the seats in the Minnesota House of Representatives, several judicial seats, two United States Senate seats, Minnesota's eight seats in the United States House of Representatives, and several seats for local offices. Special elections were also held for a Minnesota Senate seat and Minnesota's Class 2 U.S. Senate seat. A primary election to nominate Republican and Democratic–Farmer–Labor (DFL) candidates and several judicial and local primary elections were held on August 14, 2018.

== Background ==
The DFL had held all of Minnesota's executive offices since 2011 after Mark Dayton was elected governor in the 2010 gubernatorial election. They have held the office of attorney general since 1971 and the offices of secretary of state and state auditor since 2007. The Republicans have controlled the Minnesota House of Representatives since 2015 and the Minnesota Senate since 2017.

The DFL had held both of Minnesota's U.S. Senate seats since 2009 when Al Franken defeated Republican incumbent Norm Coleman after a protracted recount following the 2008 election. Lieutenant Governor Tina Smith was appointed in January 2018 to replace Franken after he resigned following sexual harassment allegations. The DFL had held Minnesota's other U.S. Senate seat since 2001, when Mark Dayton defeated Republican incumbent Rod Grams in 2000. Dayton did not seek re-election in the 2006 election and was succeeded by Amy Klobuchar in 2007.

The Republican and DFL parties held caucuses on February 6, 2018, in which eligible voters elected delegates that subsequently endorsed candidates at conventions held later in the year. Both parties also held a nonbinding preference ballot for governor.

== Electoral system ==
Elections for state and federal offices were held via first-past-the-post voting, each producing a single winner. Nominations for parties with major party status, the Republican and DFL parties, were determined by an open primary election. The candidate that won the most votes in each party became their party's nominee in the general election. If only a single candidate sought the nomination for each party, those candidates were automatically nominated and a primary election for that office was not held. Candidates for major parties had automatic ballot access. Candidates for other parties and independents were nominated by petition.

Judicial and local elections were held via the nonpartisan blanket primary. The top-two candidates that won the most votes in the primary election advanced to the general election. If not more than two candidates sought election to the same office, a primary election was not held. In multiple-winner elections, the top number of candidates that won the most votes in the primary election that were twice the number of candidates to be elected advanced to the general election. If not more than twice the number of candidates to be elected sought election, a primary election was not held. Some cities, school districts, and all townships and hospital districts did not hold a primary election, regardless of the number of candidates. Judicial and local elections were nonpartisan.

The candidate filing period was from May 22 through June 5, 2018. The filing period for cities, townships, school districts, and hospital districts that do not hold a primary election was from July 31 through August 14, 2018.

== Federal elections ==
=== United States Senate ===
==== Class 1 ====
Incumbent DFL Senator Amy Klobuchar sought re-election. State Representative Jim Newberger was the Republican nominee. Other candidates included Green Party candidate Paula Overby and Legal Marijuana Now Party candidate Dennis Schuller. Candidates who lost the primary election for the Republican nomination include Merrill Anderson, Rae Hart Anderson, and Rocky De La Fuente. Candidates who lost the primary election for the DFL nomination include Steve Carlson, Stephen Emery, David Robert Groves, and Leonard Richards. Klobuchar won re-election to a third term.

==== Class 2 (special election) ====
On December 7, 2017, incumbent DFL Senator Al Franken announced that he would resign. On December 13, DFL Governor Mark Dayton announced that he would appoint Lieutenant Governor Tina Smith to replace Franken, assuming office on January 3, 2018.

Smith sought election to the seat in the special election held alongside the general election to serve the remainder of Franken's term, expiring on January 3, 2021. State Senator Karin Housley was the Republican nominee. Other candidates included Legal Marijuana Now Party candidate Sarah Wellington and independent candidate Jerry Trooien. Candidates who lost the primary election for the Republican nomination include Bob Anderson and Nikolay Bey. Candidates who lost the primary election for the DFL nomination include Richard Painter, Ali Chehem Ali, Gregg Iverson, Nick Leonard, and Christopher Seymore. Smith won election to the remaining two years of Franken's original six-year term.

=== United States House of Representatives ===
Minnesota's eight seats in the United States House of Representatives were up for election. The DFL held five seats and the Republicans held three seats prior to the election. Both parties gained and lost two seats, resulting in no net change in the number of seats held by each party.

== State elections ==
=== Executive elections ===
==== Governor ====
Incumbent DFL Governor Mark Dayton did not seek re-election, but was eligible to do so.

Hennepin County Commissioner Jeff Johnson was the Republican nominee and U.S. Representative Tim Walz was the DFL nominee. Other candidates included Grassroots–Legalize Cannabis Party candidate Chris Wright and Libertarian Party candidate Josh Welter. Candidates who lost the primary election for the Republican nomination include former governor Tim Pawlenty and Matt Kruse. Candidates who lost the primary election for the DFL nomination include State Representative Erin Murphy, Minnesota Attorney General Lori Swanson, Tim Holden, and Olé Savior. Walz won the election.

==== Secretary of state ====
Incumbent DFL secretary of state Steve Simon announced on January 23, 2018, that he would seek re-election. Former state senator John Howe was the Republican nominee. William Denney sought election as an Independence Party candidate. Simon won re-election to a second term.

==== State auditor ====
Incumbent DFL state auditor Rebecca Otto announced on January 9, 2017, that she would not seek re-election and would instead run for governor.

Former state representative Pam Myhra was the Republican nominee. Julie Blaha was the DFL nominee. Other candidates included Legal Marijuana Now Party candidate Michael Ford and Libertarian Party candidate Chris Dock. Blaha won the election.

==== Attorney general ====
Incumbent DFL attorney general Lori Swanson announced on January 28, 2018, that she would seek re-election. On June 4, 2018, Swanson announced that she would not seek re-election and instead run for governor.

Former state representative Doug Wardlow was the Republican nominee and U.S. Representative Keith Ellison was the DFL nominee. Noah Johnson sought election as a Grassroots–Legalize Cannabis Party candidate. Candidates who lost the primary election for the Republican nomination include Sharon Anderson and former state senator Bob Lessard. Candidates who lost the primary election for the DFL nomination include State Representative Debra Hilstrom, former Ramsey County attorney Tom Foley, Matt Pelikan, and former commissioner of the Minnesota Department of Commerce Mike Rothman. Ellison won the election.

=== Legislative elections ===
==== Minnesota Senate (special election) ====
A special election was held for District 13 in the Minnesota Senate. The special election determined which political party would control the Senate as the vacancy to be filled left the Senate equally divided between the Republicans and the DFL. Jeff Howe, the Republican nominee, won the special election, preserving a one-seat Republican majority.

==== Minnesota House of Representatives ====
All 134 seats in the Minnesota House of Representatives were up for election in 2018. The Republicans held a majority of 77 seats and the DFL held 57 seats prior to the election. The DFL won a majority of 75 seats and the Republicans won 59 seats, ending a four-year Republican majority.

=== Judicial elections ===
Four seats on the Minnesota Supreme Court were up for election. Chief Justice Lorie Skjerven Gildea and Justice Barry Anderson both won re-election unopposed. Justices Margaret Chutich and Anne McKeig were both elected in their first election following their appointments. Six seats on the Minnesota Court of Appeals and several seats on the Minnesota District Courts were also up for election.

Justice Chutich faced a challenge from conservative Michelle MacDonald, whom she beat 55.9% to 43.7%. Court of Appeals Justice Lucinda Ellen Jesson faced a challenge from human-rights lawyer Anthony L. Brown, whom she defeated 62.7% to 37.0%.

County results for Chutich v. MacDonald
Chutich: 40–50% 50–60% 60–70%
MacDonald: 40–50% 50–60%

Congressional district results for Chutich v. MacDonald
Chutich: 50–60% 60–70%
MacDonald: 50–60%

County results for Jesson v. Brown
Jesson: 50–60% 60–70% 70–80%

Congressional district results for Jesson v. Brown
Jesson: 50–60% 60–70% 70–80%

== Local elections ==
Elections for several subdivisions were held—including elections for counties, municipalities, school districts, and hospital districts.

=== Counties ===
All 87 counties held regular elections. 54 counties held primary elections. Seven counties also held special elections on the day of the general election.

All counties held elections for:

- Half of the members of the county board of commissioners (including 1 special election)
- Sheriff
- County attorney

Some counties held elections for one or more of the following:

- County auditor-treasurer (51 counties)
- County auditor (8 counties)
- County treasurer (9 counties)
- County recorder (52 counties)
- County surveyor (3 counties)
- Coroner (Pipestone County)
- Half of the members of the soil and water conservation district board of supervisors (All counties except Hennepin and Ramsey, including 7 special elections)
- Half of the members of the Three Rivers Park District board of commissioners (Hennepin County excluding Minneapolis)

List of counties holding primary elections
- Aitkin
- Anoka
- Beltrami
- Big Stone
- Blue Earth
- Brown
- Carlton
- Carver
- Chippewa
- Chisago
- Clay
- Clearwater
- Cook
- Cottonwood
- Crow Wing
- Douglas
- Fillmore
- Goodhue
- Grant
- Hennepin
- Houston
- Isanti
- Itasca
- Jackson
- Kanabec
- Kandiyohi
- Kittson
- Lac qui Parle
- Lake of the Woods
- Le Sueur
- Lincoln
- Lyon
- Mahnomen
- Martin
- Mille Lacs
- Morrison
- Mower
- Murray
- Nicollet
- Otter Tail
- Ramsey
- Roseau
- St. Louis
- Scott
- Sherburne
- Sibley
- Stearns
- Stevens
- Todd
- Wadena
- Waseca
- Washington
- Winona
- Wright

=== Municipalities ===
826 cities and 638 townships held regular elections. 29 cities held primary elections. 118 cities and 49 townships held special elections. Oakdale and Red Wing held special elections on both days of the primary election and general election. Benson and Saint Paul did not have regularly scheduled elections, but each held a special election on the day of the primary election. All other special elections were held on the day of the general election. Minnetonka Beach and Motley each had a ballot question on the day of the primary election. 47 cities and 23 townships had ballot questions on the day of the general election.

Cities held elections for one or more of the following:

- Mayor (717 cities, including 7 special elections)
- Half of the members of the city council (825 cities and 115 special elections in 112 cities)
- Clerk-treasurer (10 cities, including 1 special election)
- Clerk (42 cities, including 3 special elections)
- Treasurer (34 cities, including 2 special elections)
- Half of the members of the public works/utilities/sanitary district board of directors (4 cities)
- Ballot questions (49 cities)

Townships held elections for one or more of the following:

- Half of the members of the town board of supervisors (637 townships and 30 special elections in 28 townships)
- Clerk-treasurer (18 townships)
- Clerk (212 townships, including 17 special elections)
- Treasurer (343 townships, including 8 special elections)
- Ballot questions (23 townships)

List of cities and townships holding elections
- Acoma Township
- Ada
- Adams
- Adrian
- Adrian Township
- Afton
- Agassiz Township
- Agder Township
- Aitkin^{1}
- Aitkin Township^{2}
- Akeley
- Akeley Township^{1}
- Akron Township, Big Stone County
- Albany
- Albert Lea^{3}
- Alberta
- Albertville
- Alborn Township
- Alden
- Alden Township, Freeborn County
- Aldrich
- Alexandria
- Alfsborg Township
- Alma Township
- Almond Township
- Alpha
- Altura
- Alvarado
- Alvwood Township
- Amboy
- Amboy Township
- Amiret Township
- Amo Township
- Andover
- Ann Township
- Annandale
- Anoka^{1, 3}
- Ansel Township
- Apple Valley
- Appleton
- Appleton Township
- Arago Township^{1}
- Arbo Township
- Arco
- Arden Hills
- Ardenhurst Township^{1}
- Arena Township
- Argyle
- Arlington
- Arlington Township
- Arthur Township, Traverse County
- Artichoke Township
- Arveson Township
- Ashby
- Askov^{1}
- Athens Township
- Atkinson Township
- Atwater
- Audubon
- Augsburg Township
- Augusta Township
- Austin^{3}
- Automba Township
- Avoca
- Avon^{2}
- Babbitt^{2}
- Backus
- Badger^{1}
- Badger Township
- Badoura Township
- Bagley
- Balaton
- Ball Bluff Township
- Barber Township
- Barclay Township
- Barnum
- Barnum Township
- Barrett
- Barry
- Barto Township
- Battle Lake
- Battle Plain Township^{2}
- Baudette
- Baxter
- Bayport
- Baytown Township
- Bear Park Township
- Beardsley
- Bearville Township^{1}
- Beauford Township
- Beaver Township, Aitkin County
- Beaver Township, Roseau County
- Beaver Bay
- Beaver Bay Township
- Beaver Creek^{2}
- Becker
- Becker Township, Cass County
- Bejou
- Belgrade
- Belgrade Township
- Belle Plaine
- Belle Plaine Township^{1}
- Bellechester^{1}
- Bellingham
- Beltrami
- Belview
- Bemidji^{3}
- Bena
- Bennington Township
- Benson^{4, 5}
- Benton Township
- Bergen Township
- Bernadotte Township
- Bertha^{1}
- Beseman Township
- Bethel
- Beulah Township
- Big Bend Township
- Big Falls
- Big Lake
- Big Stone Township
- Big Woods Township
- Bigelow
- Bigfork^{1}
- Bigfork Township
- Bingham Lake
- Birch Lake Township^{2}
- Birchwood Village^{1}
- Bird Island
- Bird Island Township
- Biscay
- Bismarck Township
- Biwabik^{1}
- Black River Township
- Blackberry Township
- Blackduck^{1, 2}
- Blackhoof Township
- Blaine^{3}
- Blakeley Township^{2}
- Blind Lake Township
- Blomkest
- Bloom Township
- Bloomer Township
- Blooming Prairie
- Blue Earth^{2}
- Blue Earth City Township
- Bluffton
- Bock
- Boon Lake Township
- Borup
- Bovey
- Bowlus^{1}
- Bowstring Township
- Boxville Township
- Boy Lake Township
- Boy River Township
- Boyd
- Bradbury Township
- Braham
- Brainerd
- Brandon
- Brandon Township
- Bray Township
- Breckenridge
- Breezy Point
- Brevator Township
- Brewster
- Bricelyn
- Brighton Township
- Brislet Township
- Brook Park
- Brooklyn Center
- Brooklyn Park^{2, 3}
- Brooks
- Brookston^{1}
- Brooten
- Browerville
- Browns Valley
- Browns Valley Township
- Brownsdale^{1}
- Brownsville
- Brownton^{1}
- Bruce Township^{2}
- Bruno
- Brunswick Township^{1}
- Buckman^{1}
- Buffalo
- Buffalo Lake
- Buhl
- Bull Moose Township^{1}
- Bungo Township
- Burnstown Township^{2}
- Burnsville^{3}
- Burtrum
- Buse Township
- Butler Township
- Butterfield
- Butterfield Township
- Butternut Valley Township
- Byron
- Byron Township, Cass County^{1}
- Caledonia
- Callaway^{1}
- Calumet^{2}
- Cambria Township
- Cambridge^{2, 3}
- Camden Township
- Camp Release Township
- Campbell
- Canby
- Cannon Township
- Cannon Falls^{1}
- Canton
- Caribou Township
- Carlos
- Carlston Township
- Carlton
- Carpenter Township
- Carver
- Cashel Township
- Cass Lake
- Cedar Township, Marshall County
- Cedar Mills
- Cedarbend Township
- Center City
- Centerville
- Ceresco Township
- Ceylon
- Champlin
- Chandler
- Chanhassen
- Chaska
- Chatfield
- Cherry Grove Township
- Chickamaw Beach
- Chisago City
- Chisholm^{1, 3}
- Chokio
- Clara City^{2}
- Claremont^{1}
- Clarissa
- Clark Township, Aitkin County^{1}
- Clarkfield
- Clarks Grove^{1, 2}
- Clay Township
- Clear Lake
- Clearbrook
- Clearwater
- Clearwater Township
- Clements
- Cleveland
- Cleveland Township
- Clifton Township, Traverse County
- Climax
- Clinton
- Clitherall
- Clontarf^{1}
- Clontarf Township
- Cloquet^{1, 3}
- Clover Township, Hubbard County^{1}
- Clover Township, Mahnomen County
- Clow Township
- Coates
- Cobden
- Cohasset
- Cokato
- Cold Spring
- Coleraine
- Cologne^{1}
- Columbia Heights^{2, 3}
- Columbus
- Comfort Township
- Comfrey
- Como Township
- Comstock
- Comstock Township
- Conger
- Cook
- Coon Rapids
- Corcoran
- Cordova Township
- Cornish Township, Aitkin County
- Cornish Township, Sibley County
- Correll
- Cosmos
- Cosmos Township
- Cottage Grove
- Cottonwood
- Cottonwood Township
- Courtland
- Courtland Township
- Crane Lake Township
- Crate Township
- Croke Township
- Cromwell
- Crooked Lake Township
- Crookston
- Crookston Township
- Crosby
- Crosslake
- Crow Lake Township
- Crow River Township
- Crystal
- Crystal Bay Township
- Culver Township
- Currie^{1}
- Cuyuna
- Cyrus
- Dahlgren Township
- Dakota
- Dalbo Township
- Dale Township
- Dalton
- Dane Prairie Township
- Danielson Township
- Danube
- Danvers
- Danville Township
- Darfur
- Darwin
- Darwin Township^{1}
- Dassel^{1}
- Davis Township
- Dawson
- Dayton^{3}
- De Graff
- Decoria Township^{1}
- Deephaven
- Deer Township
- Deer Creek
- Deer River
- Deer River Township
- Deerfield Township, Cass County
- Deerwood^{1}
- Deerwood Township, Crow Wing County
- Deerwood Township, Kittson County
- Delano
- Delavan
- Delhi
- Dell Grove Township^{2}
- Dellwood^{1}
- Denham
- Denmark Township
- Dennison
- Dent
- Denver Township
- Detroit Lakes^{2}
- Dexter
- Dodge Center
- Dollymount Township
- Donaldson
- Donnelly
- Donnelly Township, Marshall County
- Doran
- Dover
- Dovray
- Dovre Township
- Dresbach Township
- Dryden Township
- Dublin Township
- Dumont^{1}
- Dundas^{2}
- Dundee
- Dunn Township
- Dunnell
- Eagan
- Eagle Township
- Eagle Bend
- Eagle Lake
- Eagle Point Township
- Eagle View Township
- Eagles Nest Township
- East Bethel
- East Grand Forks
- East Gull Lake
- East Park Township
- East Side Township
- East Valley Township
- Easton
- Echo
- Eckvoll Township
- Eddy Township
- Eden Prairie
- Eden Valley
- Edgerton
- Edina
- Edison Township
- Effie
- Eidsvold Township
- Eitzen
- Elba
- Elbow Lake
- Elbow Lake Township
- Elgin
- Elizabeth
- Elk Lake Township
- Elk River^{2}
- Elko New Market^{1}
- Elkton
- Ellendale^{2}
- Ellsworth
- Elmdale
- Elmdale Township
- Elmore
- Elrosa
- Ely
- Elysian
- Embarrass Township^{1}
- Emily
- Emmons
- Enstrom Township
- Equality Township
- Erdahl Township
- Erhard
- Erskine
- Evan
- Evansville
- Eveleth
- Evergreen Township
- Excel Township
- Excelsior
- Eyota
- Fairfax^{1}
- Fairfield Township, Swift County
- Fairmont
- Fairview Township, Cass County
- Fairview Township, Lyon County
- Falk Township
- Farden Township
- Faribault
- Farmington
- Farwell
- Faxon Township
- Fayal Township
- Federal Dam^{1}
- Feeley Township
- Felton
- Fergus Falls
- Fertile
- Fifty Lakes
- Finlayson^{1}
- Fisher
- Fisher Township
- Flensburg
- Floodwood
- Florence
- Folden Township
- Foley^{1}
- Folsom Township
- Forada^{1}
- Ford Township
- Forest Township, Becker County
- Forest Lake
- Foreston
- Fork Township
- Fort Ripley
- Fosston
- Foster Township, Big Stone County
- Fountain
- Foxhome
- Foxhome Township
- Framnas Township
- Frankford Township
- Franklin
- Frazee
- Fredenberg Township
- Freeborn
- Freeland Township
- Freeport
- Fridley
- Frost
- Fulda
- Funkley
- Gail Lake Township
- Garden City Township
- Garfield
- Garrison
- Garrison Township
- Garvin
- Gary
- Gaylord
- Gem Lake
- Geneva^{1}
- Geneva Township^{1}
- Genola
- Georgetown^{1}
- Germania Township
- Germantown Township
- Ghent
- Gibbon
- Gilbert^{1, 2, 3}
- Gilman^{2}
- Glen Township
- Glencoe
- Glencoe Township
- Glenville
- Glenwood^{2}
- Glyndon
- Gonvick
- Good Hope Township, Itasca County
- Good Thunder
- Goodhue
- Goodridge^{1}
- Goodview
- Gould Township
- Graceville^{2}
- Graceville Township
- Grafton Township
- Graham Lakes Township
- Granada
- Granby Township
- Grand Lake Township
- Grand Marais
- Grand Meadow^{1}
- Grand Meadow Township
- Grand Plain Township
- Grand Rapids^{2}
- Grandview Township
- Granite Falls
- Grant
- Granville Township
- Grasston
- Grattan Township
- Gray Township
- Great Bend Township
- Green Isle
- Greenbush
- Greenfield^{1}
- Greenfield Township
- Greenwald
- Greenwood
- Greenwood Township, Clearwater County
- Gregory Township
- Grey Cloud Island Township
- Grey Eagle
- Grey Eagle Township
- Grove City^{1}
- Grove Park-Tilden Township
- Grygla
- Gully
- Guthrie Township^{1, 2}
- Hackensack
- Hadley
- Hallock^{1}
- Hallock Township
- Halma
- Halstad
- Ham Lake
- Hamburg
- Hammond
- Hampden Township
- Hampton
- Hancock
- Hancock Township
- Hangaard Township
- Hanley Falls
- Hanover
- Hanska^{1}
- Hantho Township
- Harding
- Hardwick
- Harmony
- Harris
- Harris Township^{2}
- Hartland
- Hartland Township
- Harvey Township
- Hastings^{3}
- Hatfield
- Haugen Township
- Haven Township
- Hawley
- Hayfield
- Hayward
- Hayward Township
- Hazel Run
- Hazelton Township, Kittson County
- Hector^{1}
- Hector Township
- Hegbert Township
- Heidelberg
- Helen Township^{1}
- Helena Township
- Helga Township
- Helgeland Township
- Henderson
- Henderson Township
- Hendricks
- Hendrickson Township
- Hendrum
- Henning^{1}
- Henrietta Township
- Henriette^{1}
- Hereim Township^{1}
- Herman
- Hermantown
- Heron Lake
- Heron Lake Township
- Hewitt^{1}
- Hibbing
- Hickory Township
- Higdem Township
- Highwater Township
- Hill Township
- Hill City
- Hillman
- Hillman Township, Kanabec County
- Hillman Township, Morrison County
- Hills
- Hilltop
- Hinckley^{1}
- Hines Township
- Hiram Township
- Hitterdal
- Hoffman
- Hokah^{1}
- Holden Township
- Holdingford^{1}
- Holland
- Hollandale^{1}
- Holloway^{1}
- Holly Township
- Hollywood Township
- Holst Township
- Holt
- Holyoke Township
- Home Brook Township
- Honner Township^{1}
- Hope Township
- Horton Township
- Houston
- Howard Lake
- Hoyt Lakes
- Hubbard Township, Hubbard County
- Hubbard Township, Polk County
- Hugo
- Humboldt
- Hunter Township
- Huntly Township
- Hutchinson^{3}
- Hyde Park Township
- Ihlen^{1}
- Industrial Township
- Inguadona Township^{1}
- International Falls^{2}
- Inver Grove Heights^{3}
- Iona
- Iron Junction
- Irondale Township^{1}
- Ironton^{1}
- Isanti^{3}
- Isle
- Itasca Township^{1}
- Ivanhoe
- Jackson
- Jadis Township
- Jamestown Township
- Janesville
- Jasper
- Jeffers
- Jenkins
- Jenkins Township
- Jessenland Township^{2}
- Johnson
- Jones Township
- Jordan
- Judson Township
- Jupiter Township
- Kalevala Township^{1}
- Kandiyohi
- Karlstad
- Kasota^{1}
- Kasota Township
- Kasson
- Keewatin
- Kelliher
- Kellogg
- Kelso Township^{1}
- Kennedy
- Kenneth
- Kensington^{1}
- Kent
- Kenyon
- Kenyon Township
- Kerkhoven
- Kerkhoven Township
- Kerrick^{1}
- Kettle River^{1}
- Kiester
- Kiester Township^{1}
- Kildare Township
- Kilkenny
- Kimball
- Kinbrae
- Kinghurst Township
- Kingston^{1}
- Kinney
- Kragero Township
- Kroschel Township^{1}
- Kugler Township
- La Crescent
- La Prairie^{1}
- La Prairie Township
- La Salle
- Lafayette
- Lafayette Township
- Lake Alice Township^{1}
- Lake Benton
- Lake Bronson^{1}
- Lake City^{3}
- Lake Crystal
- Lake Edward Township
- Lake Elmo
- Lake Emma Township
- Lake George Township, Hubbard County
- Lake George Township, Stearns County
- Lake Henry^{1}
- Lake Jessie Township
- Lake Lillian
- Lake Park^{1}
- Lake Pleasant Township
- Lake Prairie Township
- Lake Shore^{2}
- Lake Shore Township
- Lake St. Croix Beach
- Lake Valley Township
- Lake Wilson
- Lakefield
- Lakeland
- Lakeland Shores
- Lakeport Township^{2}
- Lakeside Township, Cottonwood County
- Laketown Township
- Lakeville
- Lamberton^{1}
- Lancaster
- Land Township
- Landfall
- Lanesboro
- Lanesburgh Township^{1}
- Laporte
- Lastrup^{1}
- Lauderdale
- Lawrence Township, Grant County
- Lawrence Township, Itasca County
- Le Center
- Le Roy
- Le Sauk Township
- Le Sueur
- Leech Lake Township
- Lengby^{1}
- Lent Township
- Leonard^{2}
- Leonardsville Township
- Leonidas
- Leslie Township
- Lester Prairie
- Lewiston
- Lewisville^{1}
- Lexington
- Lexington Township
- Libby Township
- Lien Township
- Lilydale^{1}
- Lima Township
- Lime Township
- Lincoln Township, Blue Earth County
- Lincoln Township, Marshall County
- Lind Township
- Linden Township
- Lindstrom
- Linsell Township
- Linwood Township
- Lismore
- Litchfield
- Little Canada
- Little Elbow Township^{2}
- Little Elk Township^{1}
- Little Falls^{2}
- Little Pine Township^{1}
- Littlefork
- Logan Township, Aitkin County
- London Township
- Long Beach
- Long Lake
- Long Lake Township, Crow Wing County
- Long Lake Township, Watonwan County
- Long Lost Lake Township
- Long Prairie
- Longville
- Loon Lake Township^{1}
- Loretto
- Louisburg
- Louisville Township, Red Lake County
- Louisville Township, Scott County
- Lowry^{1}
- Lucan
- Luverne
- Lyle
- Lynd^{1}
- Lynd Township
- Lyra Township
- Mabel
- Macville Township
- Madelia
- Madison
- Madison Township^{2, 5}
- Madison Lake
- Magnolia
- Mahnomen
- Mahtowa Township
- Malta Township
- Manchester
- Manchester Township
- Manhattan Beach
- Mankato^{3}
- Mankato Township
- Mansfield Township
- Mantorville
- Mantrap Township
- Maple Township
- Maple Grove
- Maple Grove Township, Becker County
- Maple Lake
- Maple Plain
- Mapleton
- Mapleton Township
- Mapleview
- Maplewood^{3}
- Marble
- Marcell Township^{1}
- Marietta
- Marine on St. Croix
- Marsh Creek Township
- Marsh Grove Township
- Marshall
- Marshfield Township
- Martin Township^{2}
- Marysland Township
- Mason Township
- Max Township
- Maxwell Township
- May Township, Cass County
- Mayer
- Maynard
- Mazeppa
- McCrea Township
- McGrath^{1}
- McGregor^{1}
- McIntosh
- McKinley
- McKinley Township
- McPherson Township
- Meadow Brook Township
- Meadowlands
- Medford
- Medicine Lake
- Medina
- Medo Township
- Meire Grove
- Melrose
- Menahga^{1, 2}
- Mendota
- Mendota Heights
- Mentor
- Middle River
- Middle River Township
- Midway Township, Cottonwood County
- Miesville
- Milaca
- Milan
- Millerville
- Millville
- Millward Township
- Milroy
- Miltona
- Miltona Township^{2}
- Minneapolis^{2, 5}
- Minneiska
- Minneiska Township^{1, 2}
- Minneota
- Minnesota City
- Minnesota Lake
- Minnetonka Beach^{6}
- Minnetrista
- Mission Township
- Mizpah
- Moltke Township
- Monroe Township
- Monson Township
- Montevideo
- Montgomery
- Monticello
- Montrose
- Moonshine Township
- Moore Township
- Moorhead
- Moose Township
- Moose Creek Township
- Moose Lake^{2}
- Moose Lake Township, Carlton County^{1}
- Moose Lake Township, Cass County
- Mora
- Morgan
- Morrill Township
- Morris
- Morristown
- Morse Township, Itasca County
- Morton
- Motley^{1, 6}
- Mound
- Mounds View
- Mount Morris Township
- Mountain Iron
- Mountain Lake
- Mountain Lake Township
- Moyer Township
- Mudgett Township
- Mulligan Township
- Murdock
- Myrtle^{1}
- Nashua
- Nashwauk
- Nashwauk Township
- Nassau
- Nelson
- Nelson Park Township
- Nerstrand^{2}
- Nesbit Township
- Nessel Township
- Nevis^{1}
- Nevis Township
- New Auburn
- New Auburn Township
- New Brighton^{2, 5}
- New Folden Township
- New Germany
- New Hope
- New Independence Township
- New London
- New Maine Township
- New Munich^{1}
- New Prague^{1}
- New Richland
- New Solum Township
- New Sweden Township
- New Trier
- New Ulm
- New York Mills
- Newfolden
- Newport
- Newry Township
- Newton Township
- Nicollet
- Nicollet Township
- Nielsville
- Nimrod
- Nisswa
- Nokay Lake Township
- Nora Township, Clearwater County
- Norcross
- Nordland Township, Aitkin County
- Nordland Township, Lyon County
- Nore Township
- North Branch^{2}
- North Fork Township
- North Mankato
- North Oaks
- North Ottawa Township
- North St. Paul
- North Star Township, Brown County
- Northern Township
- Northfield^{2}
- Northome^{1}
- Northrop
- Norway Township, Kittson County
- Norwood Young America
- Nowthen
- Numedal Township
- Nunda Township
- Oak Grove
- Oak Lawn Township^{1}
- Oak Park Township
- Oak Park Heights
- Oakdale^{1, 4}
- Oakwood Township
- Odessa
- Odessa Township
- Odin
- Odin Township
- Ogema^{1, 2}
- Ogilvie
- Okabena
- Oklee
- Olivia
- Onamia
- Ormsby
- Orono
- Oronoco
- Orr
- Orrock Township
- Ortonville
- Ortonville Township
- Osakis
- Osborne Township
- Oscar Township
- Oshawa Township
- Oslo
- Osseo
- Ostrander
- Oteneagen Township
- Otrey Township^{1}
- Otsego
- Ottawa Township
- Otter Tail Peninsula Township
- Ottertail^{1}
- Owatonna
- Owens Township
- Oxford Township
- Palisade^{2}
- Palmville Township
- Park Rapids
- Parker Township, Marshall County
- Parkers Prairie
- Parnell Township, Traverse County
- Paynesville
- Paynesville Township^{2}
- Pease
- Pelan Township^{1}
- Pelican Township, Crow Wing County
- Pelican Township, Otter Tail County
- Pelican Lake Township
- Pelican Rapids
- Pemberton
- Pennock
- Pequot Lakes
- Perch Lake Township
- Percy Township
- Perham^{2}
- Perham Township
- Perley
- Perry Lake Township
- Peterson
- Pierz
- Pierz Township
- Pike Township
- Pike Bay Township^{1}
- Pillager^{1}
- Pillsbury Township
- Pine City
- Pine City Township
- Pine Island
- Pine Lake Township, Cass County
- Pine River
- Pine River Township
- Pine Springs
- Pipestone
- Plainview^{1}
- Plato
- Platte Lake Township
- Pleasant Mound Township
- Pliny Township
- Plummer
- Plymouth
- Pohlitz Township
- Polk Centre Township
- Polonia Township
- Pomme de Terre Township
- Pomroy Township, Itasca County
- Ponto Lake Township
- Poplar Township
- Popple Township
- Poppleton Township
- Portage Township
- Porter
- Posen Township
- Powers Township
- Prairie Lake Township^{2}
- Preston
- Princeton
- Prinsburg
- Prior Township
- Prior Lake
- Proctor
- Pulaski Township
- Quamba^{1}
- Racine^{1}
- Ramsey^{1, 3}
- Randall
- Randolph^{2}
- Ranier
- Raymond
- Red Lake Falls
- Red Lake Falls Township
- Red Wing^{1, 3, 4}
- Redpath Township
- Redwood Falls
- Regal
- Reine Township
- Remer^{1}
- Remer Township^{2}
- Renville
- Revere
- Rice
- Rice Township
- Rice Lake
- Rich Valley Township
- Richardson Township
- Richardville Township
- Richfield
- Richmond^{1}
- Richville^{1}
- Ridgely Township
- River Township
- River Falls Township
- Riverdale Township
- Riverton
- Robbinsdale
- Rochester^{3}
- Rock Creek
- Rock Lake Township
- Rockford^{1}
- Rockville
- Rockwood Township, Hubbard County^{1}
- Rogers^{2}
- Rogers Township
- Rollingstone
- Rollis Township
- Roome Township
- Roosevelt^{1}
- Roscoe
- Rose Creek
- Rose Dell Township
- Roseau
- Rosemount
- Rosendale Township
- Roseville^{3}
- Roseville Township, Grant County
- Rosing Township
- Ross Township
- Ross Lake Township
- Rothsay^{1}
- Round Lake
- Round Lake Township, Becker County^{1}
- Royalton
- Rush City
- Rush Lake Township
- Rushford Village
- Rushmore
- Russell
- Ruthton
- Rutledge
- Sabin
- Sago Township
- Saint Paul^{4, 5}
- Salem Township, Cass County
- San Francisco Township
- Sanborn
- Sand Creek Township
- Sand Lake Township
- Sandstone^{1}
- Sanford Township
- Sargeant
- Sargeant Township
- Sartell
- Sauk Centre^{2}
- Sauk Rapids
- Scandia
- Scandia Valley Township
- Scanlon^{2}
- Schoolcraft Township
- Seaforth^{1}
- Sebeka^{2}
- Sedan
- Severance Township
- Seward Township
- Shafer
- Shakopee
- Sharon Township
- Shelburne Township
- Shelby Township
- Shell Rock Township
- Shelly
- Sherburn
- Sheridan Township
- Shevlin
- Shevlin Township
- Shible Township
- Shingobee Township
- Shoreview
- Shorewood
- Sibley Township
- Sigel Township
- Silver Township^{1}
- Silver Bay
- Silver Brook Township
- Silver Creek Township, Wright County^{2}
- Silver Lake
- Sinclair Township
- Sinnott Township
- Skagen Township
- Skane Township
- Skelton Township
- Skyline
- Slater Township^{1}
- Slayton
- Sleepy Eye
- Smoky Hollow Township
- Sobieski
- Sodus Township
- Solway
- South Bend Township
- South Branch Township
- South Haven^{1}
- South Red River Township
- South St. Paul^{3}
- Southbrook Township
- Southside Township
- Spang Township^{1}
- Spicer
- Split Rock Township
- Splithand Township
- Spring Brook Township
- Spring Grove
- Spring Hill
- Spring Lake Township
- Spring Lake Park
- Spring Park
- Spring Valley
- Springfield
- Springfield Township
- Springvale Township
- Spruce Township
- Spruce Valley Township
- Squaw Lake
- St. Anthony
- St. Augusta
- St. Bonifacius
- St. Charles
- St. Clair
- St. Cloud^{3}
- St. Francis
- St. Hilaire
- St. James
- St. James Township
- St. Joseph
- St. Joseph Township, Kittson County
- St. Lawrence Township
- St. Leo
- St. Martin
- St. Marys Point
- St. Mathias Township
- St. Michael^{1}
- Saint Paul^{4, 5}
- St. Rosa
- St. Stephen^{1}
- St. Vincent
- St. Vincent Township
- Stacy
- Stafford Township
- Stanchfield Township
- Staples
- Starbuck
- Stately Township
- Steamboat River Township
- Steen
- Stephen
- Sterling Township
- Stevens Township
- Stewart
- Stewartville
- Stillwater
- Stillwater Township
- Stockton
- Stokes Township, Itasca County
- Stokes Township, Roseau County
- Stony Brook Township
- Storden
- Storden Township
- Strandquist
- Strathcona
- Sturgeon Lake^{1}
- Sturgeon Lake Township
- Sumter Township
- Sunburg
- Sunfish Lake^{1}
- Svea Township
- Swanville^{1}
- Sylvan Township
- Taconite
- Tamarac Township
- Tamarack
- Taopi
- Tara Township, Traverse County
- Taunton
- Taylor Township, Traverse County
- Taylors Falls
- Tegner Township
- Teien Township
- Tenstrike
- Thief Lake Township
- Thief River Falls
- Third River Township
- Thompson Township
- Thomson Township
- Thorpe Township
- Thunder Lake Township
- Timothy Township
- Tintah
- Tintah Township
- Todd Township
- Tonka Bay
- Toqua Township
- Torrey Township
- Tower
- Tracy^{1, 2}
- Trail
- Transit Township
- Traverse Township
- Trelipe Township
- Trimont
- Trommald^{1}
- Trondhjem Township
- Trosky
- Trout Lake Township
- Troy Township, Renville County
- Truman
- Turtle Lake Township, Cass County^{1}
- Turtle River
- Twin Lakes^{1}
- Twin Lakes Township, Carlton County
- Twin Lakes Township, Mahnomen County
- Twin Valley
- Two Harbors^{2, 3}
- Tyler
- Ulen^{1}
- Underwood^{1}
- Underwood Township
- Upsala
- Urbank
- Utica
- Vadnais Heights
- Valley Township
- Vega Township
- Veldt Township
- Verdon Township
- Vergas
- Vermillion
- Verndale
- Vernon Center
- Vernon Center Township
- Verona Township
- Vesta
- Vesta Township
- Victoria
- Vienna Township
- Viking
- Viking Township
- Villard^{2}
- Villard Township^{1}
- Vining
- Virginia^{2}
- Waasa Township
- Wabana Township
- Wabasha^{1}
- Wabasso
- Wabedo Township^{1, 2}
- Waconia
- Wadena
- Wagner Township
- Wahkon
- Waite Park
- Walden Township, Cass County^{1, 2}
- Waldorf
- Walker
- Walls Township
- Walnut Grove
- Walters
- Waltham^{1}
- Wanamingo
- Wanda^{1}
- Wanger Township
- Warba
- Ward Township
- Warren^{2}
- Warrenton Township
- Warroad
- Waseca
- Washington Township
- Washington Lake Township
- Watertown
- Watertown Township
- Waterville
- Watkins
- Watson
- Waubun
- Waukenabo Township^{1}
- Waverly
- Wawina Township
- Wayzata
- Welcome
- Wells
- Wendell
- West Concord^{1}
- West Newton Township
- West St. Paul^{2, 3}
- West Union
- West Valley Township
- Westbrook
- Westbrook Township
- Westerheim Township
- Westport
- Whalan
- Wheaton
- White Township
- White Bear Township
- White Oak Township
- Whiteford Township
- Whitewater Township
- Wilder
- Wildwood Township
- Wilkinson Township
- Willernie
- Williams
- Williams Township
- Willmar^{2, 3}
- Willow River
- Willow Valley Township
- Wilmont
- Wilson Township, Cass County
- Wilton
- Windom
- Windsor Township
- Winfield Township
- Winger^{1}
- Winnebago
- Winona
- Winsor Township
- Winsted
- Winsted Township
- Winthrop
- Winton^{1}
- Wirt Township
- Wolf Lake
- Wolford Township^{1}
- Wolverton
- Wood Lake
- Wood Lake Township
- Woodbury
- Woodland
- Woodrow Township, Cass County^{1}
- Woodstock
- Woodville Township
- Workman Township
- Worthington^{2}
- Worthington Township
- Wrenshall
- Wrenshall Township
- Wright^{1}
- Wright Township
- Wykoff
- Wylie Township
- Wyoming
- Yellow Bank Township
- Young America Township^{2}
- Zemple
- Zimmerman^{1}
- Zumbro Township
- Zumbro Falls^{1}
- Zumbrota
- ^{1}One or more special elections were held on the day of the general election.
- ^{2}Had one or more ballot questions on the day of the general election.
- ^{3}A primary election was held.
- ^{4}One or more special elections were held on the day of the primary election.
- ^{5}Did not have regularly scheduled elections.
- ^{6}Had a ballot question on the day of the primary election.

=== School districts ===
284 school districts held regular elections to elect half of the members of their board of directors. Six school districts held primary elections. Braham, Eden Prairie, and Holdingford did not have regularly scheduled elections, but each held a special election on the day of the general election. 24 other school districts also held special elections on the day of the general election. Five school districts had ballot questions on the day of the primary election. 56 school districts had ballot questions on the day of the general election.

List of school districts holding elections
- Ada-Borup^{1}
- Adrian^{2}
- Aitkin
- Albany
- Albert Lea
- Alden^{2}
- Alexandria
- Annandale
- Ashby
- Atwater-Cosmos-Grove City^{2}
- Austin
- Badger
- Bagley
- Barnesville^{2, 4}
- Barnum
- Battle Lake
- Becker
- Belgrade-Brooten-Elrosa^{2}
- Bemidji
- Benson^{1, 3}
- Bertha-Hewitt
- Big Lake
- Blackduck
- Blue Earth Area
- BOLD
- Braham^{1, 2, 4}
- Brainerd
- Brandon-Evansville
- Breckenridge
- Brooklyn Center
- Browerville
- Browns Valley
- Buffalo Lake-Hector
- Buffalo-Hanover-Montrose^{2, 4}
- Burnsville
- Butterfield
- Byron
- Caledonia
- Cambridge-Isanti
- Campbell-Tintah
- Cannon Falls
- Carlton
- Cass Lake-Bena
- Cedar Mountain^{2}
- Centennial^{2}
- Chatfield
- Chisago Lakes
- Chisholm
- Chokio-Alberta
- Clearbrook-Gonvick^{2}
- Cleveland^{3}
- Climax
- Clinton-Graceville-Beardsley
- Cloquet
- Columbia Heights^{2, 5}
- Comfrey
- Cook County
- Cromwell-Wright
- Crookston
- Crosby-Ironton
- Dassel-Cokato^{1, 2}
- Dawson-Boyd
- Deer River
- Delano
- Detroit Lakes^{2}
- Dilworth-Glyndon-Felton
- Dover-Eyota
- Duluth^{2, 4}
- East Grand Forks
- Eastern Carver County
- Eden Prairie^{1, 4}
- Eden Valley-Watkins^{2}
- Edgerton^{2}
- Elk River
- Ellsworth
- Ely
- Esko
- Eveleth-Gilbert
- Fairmont Area Schools
- Faribault
- Farmington
- Fergus Falls
- Fertile-Beltrami
- Fillmore Central
- Fisher
- Floodwood^{2}
- Foley^{1}
- Forest Lake^{2}
- Fosston^{2}
- Frazee-Vergas^{2}
- Fulda
- Gibbon-Fairfax-Winthrop^{1}
- Glencoe-Silver Lake^{2}
- Glenville-Emmons^{2}
- Goodhue^{2, 4}
- Goodridge
- Granada Huntley-East Chain
- Grand Meadow
- Grand Rapids
- Greenbush-Middle River
- Greenway
- Grygla
- Hancock^{2}
- Hawley
- Hayfield
- Hendricks
- Henning
- Herman-Norcross
- Hermantown
- Heron Lake-Okabena^{2}
- Hibbing^{1}
- Hill City
- Hills-Beaver Creek
- Holdingford^{1, 2, 4}
- Houston
- Howard Lake-Waverly-Winsted
- Hutchinson
- International Falls
- Isle
- Ivanhoe
- Jackson County Central^{1}
- Janesville-Waldorf-Pemberton^{2}
- Jordan^{1}
- Kasson-Mantorville
- Kelliher
- Kenyon-Wanamingo
- Kerkhoven-Murdock-Sunburg
- Kimball^{1}
- Kingsland^{2}
- Kittson Central
- La Crescent-Hokah
- Lac qui Parle Valley
- Lake Benton
- Lake City
- Lake Crystal-Wellcome Memorial
- Lake of the Woods
- Lake Park-Audubon^{1}
- Lake Superior
- Lakeview
- Lakeville
- Lancaster^{1}
- Lanesboro^{1, 2}
- Laporte^{1}
- Le Sueur-Henderson
- LeRoy-Ostrander^{2}
- Lester Prairie
- Lewiston-Altura
- Litchfield
- Little Falls
- Littlefork-Big Falls
- Long Prairie-Grey Eagle
- Luverne
- Lyle
- Mabel-Canton
- MACCRAY^{2}
- Madelia^{1}
- Mahnomen
- Mahtomedi^{2}
- Maple Lake
- Maple River
- Marshall
- Marshall County Central
- Martin County West
- McGregor
- Medford^{1}
- Melrose
- Menahga
- Mesabi East
- Milaca^{2}
- Milroy
- Minneapolis^{2, 5}
- Minneota
- Minnewaska^{1}
- Montevideo
- Moorhead
- Moose Lake
- Mora
- Morris Area
- Mountain Iron-Buhl^{1}
- Mountain Lake^{3, 4}
- Murray County Central
- N.R.H.E.G.
- Nashwauk-Keewatin
- Nett Lake
- Nevis
- New London-Spicer
- New Prague Area
- New Ulm
- New York Mills
- Nicollet
- Norman County East
- Norman County West
- North Branch^{1}
- North St. Paul-Maplewood
- Northfield^{2}
- Northland Community
- Ogilvie^{3, 4}
- Onamia
- Ortonville
- Osakis
- Osseo^{1}
- Owatonna
- Park Rapids
- Parkers Prairie^{2}
- Paynesville
- Pelican Rapids
- Pequot Lakes
- Perham
- Pierz
- Pillager
- Pine City
- Pine Island
- Pine River-Backus
- Pipestone Area
- Plainview-Elgin-Millville^{2}
- Princeton
- Prior Lake
- Proctor
- Randolph^{2}
- Red Lake County Central^{1}
- Red Lake Falls
- Red Lake^{2, 5}
- Red Rock Central^{2}
- Red Wing^{2}
- Redwood Falls Area
- Renville County West
- Robbinsdale^{2}
- Rochester^{5}
- Rockford^{2}
- Rocori
- Roseau
- Round Lake-Brewster
- Royalton
- Rush City^{2, 4}
- Rushford-Peterson^{1, 2}
- Saint Paul^{2, 4}
- Sartell^{2}
- Sauk Centre
- Sauk Rapids
- Sebeka
- Shakopee
- Sibley East
- Sleepy Eye
- South Koochiching
- South St. Paul
- Southland^{2}
- Spring Grove
- Springfield
- St. Charles
- St. Clair
- St. Cloud Area^{5}
- St. Francis
- St. James
- St. Louis County
- St. Michael-Albertville
- Staples-Motley
- Stephen-Argyle Central
- Stewartville
- Stillwater
- Swanville
- Thief River Falls
- Tracy Area School District
- Tri-City United
- Tri-County^{1}
- Triton^{2}
- Truman
- Ulen-Hitterdal
- Underwood
- United South Central
- Upsala
- Verndale
- Virginia^{2}
- Wabasha-Kellogg
- Wabasso
- Waconia^{2}
- Wadena-Deer Creek
- Walker-Hackensack-Akeley
- Warren-Alvarado-Oslo
- Warroad
- Waseca
- Watertown-Mayer^{1}
- Waterville-Elysian-Morristown^{1, 2}
- Waubun
- West Central Area^{2}
- Westbrook-Walnut Grove
- Wheaton Area
- Willmar^{2}
- Willow River
- Windom
- Win-E-Mac
- Winona Area^{2, 5}
- Worthington^{3}
- Wrenshall^{2}
- Yellow Medicine East
- Zumbrota-Mazeppa
- ^{1}A special election was held on the day of the general election.
- ^{2}Had one or more ballot questions on the day of the general election.
- ^{3}Had one or more ballot questions on the day of the primary election.
- ^{4}Did not have regularly scheduled elections.
- ^{5}A primary election was held.

=== Hospital districts ===
16 hospital districts held regular elections to elect half of the members of their board of directors. Six hospital districts also held special elections on the day of the general election.

List of hospital districts holding elections
- Canby Community
- Cook County
- Cook-Orr
- Cuyuna Range^{1}
- Dawson Area
- Glacial Ridge
- Monticello-Big Lake Community^{1}
- Moose Lake Community
- North Pine Area^{1}
- North Suburban
- Northern Itasca^{1}
- Paynesville Area
- Pelican Valley^{1}
- Perham^{1}
- Staples Area
- United
- ^{1}One or more special elections were held on the day of the general election.
