= List of school districts in Minnesota =

Map of Minnesota School Districts

This is a complete list of school districts in the State of Minnesota.

All school districts in the state are counted as independent governments by the U.S. Census Bureau. No school districts in the state are dependent on any county government or municipal government.

== Aitkin County ==
- Aitkin Public School District (ISD #1)
- Hill City Public School District (ISD #2)
- McGregor School District (ISD #4)

== Anoka County ==
- Anoka-Hennepin Public School District (ISD #11)
- Centennial Public School District (ISD #12)
- Columbia Heights Public School District (ISD #13)
- Fridley Public School District (ISD #14)
- Saint Francis School District (ISD #15)
- Spring Lake Park School District (ISD #16)

== Becker County ==
- Detroit Lakes Public School District (ISD #22)
- Frazee-Vergas Public School District (ISD #23)
- Lake Park-Audubon School District (ISD #24)
- Pine Point School District (ISD #25)

== Beltrami County ==
- Bemidji Area Schools (ISD #31)
- Blackduck Public School District (ISD #32)
- Kelliher Public School District (ISD #36)
- Red Lake School District (ISD #38)

== Benton County ==
- Foley Public School District (ISD #51)
- Sauk Rapids School District (ISD #47)

== Big Stone County ==
- Clinton-Graceville-Beardsley School District (ISD #2888)
- Ortonville School District (ISD #2903)

== Blue Earth County ==
- Lake Crystal-Wellcome Memorial School District (ISD #2071)
- Mankato School District (ISD #77)
- Maple River School District (ISD #2135)
- Saint Clair School District (ISD #75)

== Brown County ==
- Comfrey Public School District (ISD #81)
- New Ulm School District (ISD #88)
- Sleepy Eye School District (ISD #84)
- Springfield School District (ISD #85)

== Carlton County ==
- Barnum Public School District (ISD #91)
- Carlton-Wrenshall Public School District (ISD #2918)
- Cloquet Public School District (ISD #94)
- Cromwell-Wright School District (ISD #95)
- Esko Public School District (ISD #99)
- Moose Lake School District (ISD #97)

== Carver County ==
- Central Public Schools (ISD #108)
- Eastern Carver County Schools (ISD #112)
- Waconia Public Schools (ISD #110)
- Watertown-Mayer School District (ISD #111)

== Cass County ==
- Cass Lake-Bena School District (ISD #115)
- Northland Community School District (ISD #118)
- Pillager School District (ISD #116)
- Pine River-Backus School District (ISD #2174)
- Walker-Hackensack-Akeley School District (ISD #113)

== Chippewa County ==
- MACCRAY Public Schools (ISD #2180)
- Montevideo School District (ISD #129)

== Chisago County ==
- Chisago Lakes School District (ISD #2144)
- North Branch School District (ISD #138)
- Rush City School District (ISD #139)

== Clay County ==
- Barnesville Public School District (ISD #146)
- Dilworth-Glyndon-Felton School District (ISD #2164)
- Hawley Public School District (ISD #150)
- Moorhead School District (ISD #152)
- Ulen-Hitterdal School District (ISD #914)

== Clearwater County ==
- Bagley Public School District (ISD #162)
- Clearbrook-Gonvick School District (ISD #2311)

== Cook County ==
- Cook County School District (ISD #166)

== Cottonwood County ==
- Mountain Lake School District (ISD #173)
- Westbrook-Walnut Grove School District (ISD #2898)
- Windom School District (ISD #177)

== Crow Wing County ==
- Brainerd Public School District (ISD #181)
- Crosby-Ironton Public School District (ISD #182)
- Pequot Lakes School District (ISD #186)

== Dakota County ==
- Burnsville-Eagan-Savage School District (ISD #191)
- Farmington Area Public Schools (ISD #192)
- Hastings Public School District (ISD 200)
- Intermediate School District 917
- Inver Grove Heights School District (ISD 199)
- Lakeville Independent School District 194
- Randolph School District (ISD 195)
- Rosemount-Apple Valley-Eagan School District (ISD #196)
- South Saint Paul School District (Special School District #6)
- West Saint Paul-Mendota Heights-Eagan School District (ISD #197)

== Dodge County ==
- Hayfield Public School District (ISD #203)
- Kasson-Mantorville School District (ISD #204)
- Triton School District (ISD #2125)

== Douglas County ==
- Alexandria Public School District (ISD #206)
- Brandon-Evansville School District (ISD #2908)
- Osakis School District (ISD #213)

== Faribault County ==
- Blue Earth Area Public School District (ISD #2860)
- United South Central School District (ISD #2134)

== Fillmore County ==
- Fillmore Central School District (ISD #2198)
- Kingsland School District (ISD #2137)
- Lanesboro School District (ISD #229)
- Mabel-Canton School District (ISD #238)
- Rushford-Peterson School District (ISD #239)

== Freeborn County ==
- Albert Lea Public School District (ISD #241)
- Alden-Conger Public School District (ISD #242)
- Glenville-Emmons School District (ISD #2886)

== Goodhue County ==
- Cannon Falls Area Schools (ISD #252)
- Goodhue School District (ISD #253)
- Kenyon-Wanamingo School District (ISD #2172)
- Pine Island School District (ISD #255)
- Red Wing Public Schools (ISD #256)

== Grant County ==
- Ashby Public School District (ISD #261)
- Herman-Norcross Public School District (ISD #264)
- West Central Area Schools (ISD #2342)

== Hennepin County ==
- Bloomington Public School District (ISD #271)
- Brooklyn Center School District (ISD #286)
- Eden Prairie Public School District (ISD #272)
- Edina Public Schools (ISD #273)
- Hopkins Public Schools (ISD #270)
- Intermediate School District 287
- Minneapolis Public Schools (Special School District #1)
- Minnetonka School District (ISD #276)
- Orono School District (ISD #278)
- Osseo School District (ISD #279)
- Richfield Public Schools (ISD #280)
- Robbinsdale Area Schools (ISD #281)
- St. Anthony-New Brighton School District (ISD #282)
- Saint Louis Park School District (ISD #283)
- Wayzata Public Schools (ISD #284)
- Westonka School District (ISD #277)

== Houston County ==
- Caledonia Public School District (ISD #299)
- Houston Public Schools (ISD #294)
- La Crescent-Hokah School District (ISD #300)
- Spring Grove School District (ISD #297)

== Hubbard County ==
- Laporte School District (ISD #306)
- Nevis School District (ISD #308)
- Park Rapids School District (ISD #309)

== Isanti County ==
- Braham Public School District (ISD #314)
- Cambridge-Isanti Public School District (ISD #911)

== Itasca County ==
- Deer River Public School District (ISD #317)
- Grand Rapids School District - Independent School District 318
- Greenway School District (ISD #316)
- Nashwauk-Keewatin School District (ISD #319)

== Jackson County ==
- Heron Lake-Okabena Public School District (ISD #330)
- Jackson County Central School District (ISD #2895)

== Kanabec County ==
- Mora School District (ISD #332)
- Ogilvie School District (ISD #333)

== Kandiyohi County ==
- New London-Spicer School District (ISD #345)
- Willmar School District (ISD #347)

== Kittson County ==
- Kittson Central School District (ISD #2171)
- Lancaster School District (ISD #356)
- Tri-County School District (ISD #2358)

== Koochiching County ==
- International Falls School District (ISD #361)
- Littlefork-Big Falls School District (ISD #362)
- South Koochiching School District (ISD #363)

== Lac qui Parle County ==
- Dawson-Boyd Public School District (ISD #378)
- Lac qui Parle Valley School District (ISD #2853)

== Lake County ==
- Lake Superior School District (ISD #381)

== Lake of the Woods County ==
- Lake of the Woods School District (ISD #390)

== Le Sueur County ==
- Cleveland Public School District (ISD #391)
- Le Sueur-Henderson School District (ISD #397)
- Tri-City United School District (ISD #2905)
- Waterville-Elysian-Morristown School District (ISD #2143)

== Lincoln County ==
- Hendricks Public School District (ISD #402)
- Ivanhoe Public School District (ISD #403)
- Lake Benton School District (ISD #404)
- Russell Tyler Ruthton School District (ISD #2902)

== Lyon County ==
- Lakeview School District (ISD #2167)
- Lynd School District (ISD #415)
- Marshall School District (ISD #413)
- Minneota School District (ISD #414)
- Tracy School District (ISD #2913)

== Mahnomen County ==
- Mahnomen School District (ISD #432)
- Waubun-Ogema-White Earth School District (ISD #435)

== Marshall County ==
- Grygla School District (ISD #447)
- Marshall County Central School District (ISD #441)
- Stephen-Argyle School District (ISD #2856)
- Warren-Alvarado-Oslo School District (ISD #2176)

== Martin County ==
- Fairmont Area School District (ISD #2752)
- Granada Huntley-East Chain School District (ISD #2536)
- Martin County West School District (ISD #2448)
- Truman School District (ISD #458)

== McLeod County ==
- Glencoe-Silver Lake School District (ISD #2859)
- Hutchinson Public School District (ISD #423)
- Lester Prairie School District (ISD #424)

== Meeker County ==
- Atwater-Cosmos-Grove-City School District (ISD #2396)
- Eden Valley-Watkins School District (ISD #463)
- Litchfield School District (ISD #465)

== Mille Lacs County ==
- Isle Public School District (ISD #473)
- Milaca School District (ISD #912)
- Onamia School District (ISD #480)
- Princeton School District (ISD #477)

== Morrison County ==
- Little Falls School District (ISD #482)
- Pierz School District (ISD #484)
- Royalton School District (ISD #485)
- Swanville School District (ISD #486)
- Upsala School District (ISD #487)

== Mower County ==
- Austin Public School District (ISD #492)
- Grand Meadow School District (ISD #495)
- Leroy-Ostrander School District (ISD #499)
- Lyle School District (ISD #497)
- Southland School District (ISD #500)

== Murray County ==
- Fulda Public School District (ISD #505)
- Murray County Central School District (ISD #2169)

== Nicollet County ==
- Nicollet School District (ISD #507)
- Saint Peter School District (ISD #508)

== Nobles County ==
- Adrian Public School District (ISD #511)
- Ellsworth Public School District (ISD #514)
- Round Lake-Brewster School District (ISD #2907)
- Worthington School District (ISD #518)

== Norman County ==
- Ada-Borup-West Public School District (ISD #2910)
- Norman County East School District (ISD #2215)

== Olmsted County ==
- Byron Public School District (ISD #531)
- Chatfield School District (ISD #227)
- Dover-Eyota Public School District (ISD #533)
- Rochester School District (ISD #535)
- Stewartville School District (ISD #534)

== Otter Tail County ==
- Battle Lake Public School District (ISD #542)
- Fergus Falls Public School District (ISD #544)
- Henning Public School District (ISD #545)
- New York Mills School District (ISD #553)
- Parkers Prairie School District (ISD #547)
- Pelican Rapids School District (ISD #548)
- Perham-Dent School District (ISD #549)
- Underwood School District (ISD #550)

== Pennington County ==
- Goodridge School District (ISD #561)
- Thief River Falls School District (ISD #564)

== Pine County ==
- East Central School District (ISD #2580)
- Hinckley-Finlayson Public School District (ISD #2165)
- Pine City School District (ISD #578)
- Willow River School District (ISD #577)

== Pipestone County ==
- Edgerton Public School District (ISD #581)
- Pipestone Area School District (ISD #2689)

== Polk County ==
- Climax-Shelly Public School (ISD #592)
- Crookston Public School District (ISD #593)
- East Grand Forks Public School District (ISD #595)
- Fertile-Beltrami School District (ISD #599)
- Fisher Public School District (ISD #600)
- Fosston Public School District (ISD #601)
- Win-E-Mac School District (ISD #2609)

== Pope County ==
- Minnewaska School District (ISD #2149)

== Ramsey County ==
- Mounds View School District (ISD #621)
- North Saint Paul-Maplewood Oakdale School District (ISD #622)
- Northeast Metro 916 Intermediate School District
- Roseville Area Schools (ISD #623)
- Saint Paul Public Schools (ISD #625)
- White Bear Lake Area School District (ISD #624)

== Red Lake County ==
- Red Lake County Central School District (ISD #2906)
- Red Lake Falls School District (ISD #630)

== Redwood County ==
- Cedar Mountain School District (ISD #2754)
- Red Rock Central School District (ISD #2884)
- Redwood Valley Area School District (ISD #2897)
- Wabasso School District (ISD #640)

== Renville County ==
- Bird Island-Olivia-Lake Lillian Public School District (ISD #2534)
- Buffalo Lake-Hector-Stewart Public School District (ISD #2159)
- Renville County West School District (ISD #2890)

== Rice County ==
- Faribault Public School District (ISD #656)
- Northfield School District (ISD #659)

== Rock County ==
- Hills-Beaver Creek Public School District (ISD #671)
- Luverne School District (ISD #2184)

== Roseau County ==
- Badger Public School District (ISD #676)
- Greenbush-Middle River School District (ISD #2683)
- Roseau School District (ISD #682)
- Warroad School District (ISD #690)

== Saint Louis County ==
- Chisholm Public School District (ISD #695)
- Duluth Public Schools (ISD #709)
- Ely Public School District (ISD #696)
- Floodwood Public School District (ISD #698)
- Hermantown Public School District (ISD #700)
- Hibbing Public School District (ISD #701)
- Lake Superior School District (ISD #381)
- Mesabi East School District (ISD #2711)
- Mountain Iron-Buhl School District (ISD #712)
- Proctor School District (ISD #704)
- Rock Ridge Public Schools (ISD #2909)
- Saint Louis County School District (ISD #2142)

== Scott County ==
- Belle Plaine Public School District (ISD #716)
- Jordan School District (ISD #717)
- New Prague Area School District (ISD #721)
- Prior Lake-Savage School District (ISD #719)
- Shakopee School District (ISD #720)
- SouthWest Metro Intermediate District#288

== Sherburne County ==
- Becker Public School District (ISD #726)
- Big Lake Public School District (ISD #727)
- Independent School District 728

== Sibley County ==
- Gibbon Fairfax Winthrop School District (ISD #2365)
- Sibley East Public Schools (ISD #2310)

== Stearns County ==
- Albany Public School District (ISD #745)
- Belgrade-Brooten-Elrosa Public School District (ISD #2364)
- Holdingford Public School District (ISD #738)
- Kimball Public School District (ISD #739)
- Melrose School District (ISD #740)
- Paynesville School District (ISD #741)
- Rocori School District (ISD #750)
- Saint Cloud School District (ISD #742)
- Sartell-St. Stephen School District (ISD #748)
- Sauk Centre School District (ISD #743)

== Steele County ==
- Blooming Prairie Public School District (ISD #756)
- Medford School District (ISD #763)
- Owatonna School District (ISD #761)

== Stevens County ==
- Chokio-Alberta Public School District (ISD #771)
- Hancock Public School District (ISD #768)
- Morris School District (ISD #2769)

== Swift County ==
- Benson Public School District (ISD #777)
- Kerkhoven-Murdock-Sunburg School District (ISD #775)

== Todd County ==
- Bertha-Hewitt Public School District (ISD #786)
- Browerville Public School District (ISD #787)
- Long Prairie-Grey Eagle School District (ISD #2753)
- Staples-Motley School District (ISD #2170)

== Traverse County ==
- Browns Valley Public School District (ISD #801)
- Wheaton Area School School District (ISD #803)

== Wabasha County ==
- Lake City School District (ISD #813)
- Plainview Elgin Millville School District (ISD #2899)
- Wabasha-Kellogg School District (ISD #811)
- Zumbrota-Mazeppa School District (ISD #2805)

== Wadena County ==
- Menahga School District (ISD #821)
- Sebeka School District (ISD #820)
- Verndale School District (ISD #818)
- Wadena-Deer Creek School District (ISD #2155)

== Waseca County ==
- Janesville-Waldorf-Pemberton School District (ISD #2835)
- New Richland Hartland Ellendale Geneva School District (ISD #2168)
- Waseca School District (ISD #829)

== Washington County ==
- Forest Lake Public School District (ISD #831)
- Mahtomedi School District (ISD #832)
- South Washington County School District (ISD #833)
- Stillwater School District (ISD (#834)

== Watonwan County ==
- Butterfield Public School District (ISD #836)
- Madelia School District (ISD #837)
- Saint James School District (ISD #840)

== Wilkin County ==
- Breckenridge Public School District (ISD #846)
- Campbell-Tintah Public School District (ISD #852)
- Rothsay School District (ISD #850)

== Winona County ==
- Lewiston-Altura School District (ISD #857)
- Saint Charles School District (ISD #858)
- Winona Independent School District (ISD #861)

== Wright County ==
- Annandale Public School District (ISD #876)
- Buffalo-Hanover-Montrose Schools (ISD #877)
- Dassel-Cokato Public School District (ISD #466)
- Delano Public School District (ISD #879)
- Howard Lake-Waverly-Winsted Public School District (ISD #2687)
- Maple Lake School District (ISD #881)
- Monticello School District (ISD #882)
- Rockford Area Schools (ISD #883)
- Saint Michael-Albertville School District (ISD #885)

== Yellow Medicine County ==
- Canby Public School District (ISD #891)
- Yellow Medicine East School District (ISD #2190)
