= Pipestone Area School District =

School district in Minnesota, United States

Pipestone Area School District, Independent School District 2689 serves the communities of Pipestone, Woodstock, Hatfield, Trosky, Holland, Ihlen and Jasper. As of 2015 the district superintendent is Jim Lentz.

== District schools ==
- Pipestone Area High School/Middle School
- Alexander Hugh Brown Elementary
- Dolson Hill Elementary

== See also ==
- List of school districts in Minnesota
