= Westbrook High School =

Westbrook High School may refer to:

- Westbrook High School (Connecticut), in Westbrook, Connecticut
- Westbrook High School (Maine), in Westbrook, Maine
- Westbrook-Walnut Grove Senior School, in Westbrook, Minnesota, part of the Westbrook-Walnut Grove School district
- Westbrook High School (Texas), in Westbrook, Texas
- West Brook Senior High School, in Beaumont, Texas
