= Karlstad, Minnesota =

City in Minnesota, United States

Karlstad
- City
- Location of Karlstad, Minnesota
- Coordinates: 48°34′34″N 96°31′8″W
- Country: United States
- State: Minnesota
- County: Kittson

Government
  - Mayor: Dale Nelson

Area
  - Total: 1.51 sq mi (3.90 km^{2})
  - Land: 1.50 sq mi (3.89 km^{2})
  - Water: 0 sq mi (0.00 km^{2})
- Elevation: 1,050 ft (320 m)

Population (2020)
  - Total: 710
  - Density: 472.3/sq mi (182.35/km^{2})
- Time zone: UTC-6 (CST)
  - Summer (DST): UTC-5 (CDT)
- ZIP code: 56732
- Area code: 218
- FIPS code: 27-32444
- GNIS feature ID: 0646041
- Website: cityofkarlstad.com

Karlstad (/ˈkɑːrlstæd/ KARL-stad) is a city in Kittson County, Minnesota, United States. The population was 710 at the 2020 census.

U.S. Route 59 and Minnesota State Highway 11 are two of the main arterial routes in the city. The city's slogan is "The Moose Capital of the North".

== History ==
A post office called Karlstad has been in operation since 1905. The city was named after Karlstad, Sweden.

== Enterprise ==
Karlstad's largest employers are Wikstrom Telephone Company (Wiktel) and Mattracks. Wiktel provides internet and phone services for much of northwestern Minnesota, including the regional telephone directory. The company has a long history in Karlstad, dating to the early 1900s. It was founded by the Wikstrom family. Mattracks manufactures and markets track conversion systems. Mattracks Innovation Center is housed in the location of the former Germundson's Home Furnishings. Other businesses include stores, restaurants, bars, and insurance and accounting services. The local economy is primarily agricultural.

From 1951 through 1995, the town had its own hospital.

== Events ==
Karlstad holds an annual Kick'n Up Kountry Music Festival and Moosefest.

== Education ==
Karlstad has two schools: Tri-County Public Schools and Heritage Christian School. Both serve grades K-12. Tri-County combines with Marshall County Central Schools of Newfolden, Minnesota, 17 miles south, for its athletic programs. The name of the consolidated team is the Northern Freeze. Girls' and boys' track are also combined with Badger School and Greenbush Middle River School. Baseball and softball have included Stephen-Argyle School District in their sports coops. The Northern Freeze, since the coop, have advanced to the State Tournament three times: in volleyball (2006, sixth place), baseball (2009) and girls' basketball (2010, fourth place).

== Geography ==
According to the United States Census Bureau, the city has an area of 1.53 square miles (3.96 km^{2}), all land.

== Demographics ==
Historical population
Census	Pop.	Note	%±
1910	138		—
1920	286		107.2%
1930	304		6.3%
1940	501		64.8%
1950	804		60.5%
1960	720		−10.4%
1970	727		1.0%
1980	934		28.5%
1990	881		−5.7%
2000	794		−9.9%
2010	760		−4.3%
2020	710		−6.6%
U.S. Decennial Census; 2020 Census

=== 2010 census ===
As of the census of 2010, there were 760 people, 331 households, and 189 families residing in the city. The population density was 496.7 inhabitants per square mile (191.8/km^{2}). There were 399 housing units at an average density of 260.8 per square mile (100.7/km^{2}). The racial makeup of the city was 99.1% White, 0.3% African American, 0.1% Native American, 0.3% Asian, and 0.3% from two or more races. Hispanic or Latino of any race were 0.4% of the population.

There were 331 households, of which 24.2% had children under the age of 18 living with them, 44.4% were married couples living together, 8.5% had a female householder with no husband present, 4.2% had a male householder with no wife present, and 42.9% were non-families. 39.6% of all households were made up of individuals, and 23.6% had someone living alone who was 65 years of age or older. The average household size was 2.16 and the average family size was 2.92.

The median age in the city was 47.5 years. 22.5% of residents were under the age of 18; 5.1% were between the ages of 18 and 24; 20% were from 25 to 44; 24.8% were from 45 to 64; and 27.6% were 65 years of age or older. The gender makeup of the city was 45.4% male and 54.6% female.

=== 2000 census ===
As of the census of 2000, there were 794 people, 340 households, and 199 families residing in the city. The population density was 522.3 inhabitants per square mile (201.7/km^{2}). There were 394 housing units at an average density of 259.2 per square mile (100.1/km^{2}). The racial makeup of the city was 97.86% White, 0.63% Native American, 0.13% from other races, and 1.39% from two or more races. Hispanic or Latino of any race were 0.38% of the population. 47.5% were of Norwegian, 19.9% Swedish and 9.9% German ancestry.

There were 340 households, out of which 24.1% had children under the age of 18 living with them, 44.7% were married couples living together, 10.6% had a female householder with no husband present, and 41.2% were non-families. 36.5% of all households were made up of individuals, and 23.2% had someone living alone who was 65 years of age or older. The average household size was 2.15 and the average family size was 2.81.

In the city, the population was spread out, with 21.9% under the age of 18, 7.1% from 18 to 24, 21.4% from 25 to 44, 22.0% from 45 to 64, and 27.6% who were 65 years of age or older. The median age was 45. For every 100 females, there were 85.9 males. For every 100 females age 18 and over, there were 83.4 males.

The median income for a household in the city was $25,208, and the median income for a family was $35,469. Males had a median income of $29,444 versus $20,893 for females. The per capita income for the city was $13,274. About 9.2% of families and 13.4% of the population were below the poverty line, including 14.4% of those under age 18 and 15.3% of those age 65 or over.

== Notable person ==
- Ned Beatty - American actor
