= Bowstring Township, Itasca County, Minnesota =

Bowstring Township, Minnesota
- Township
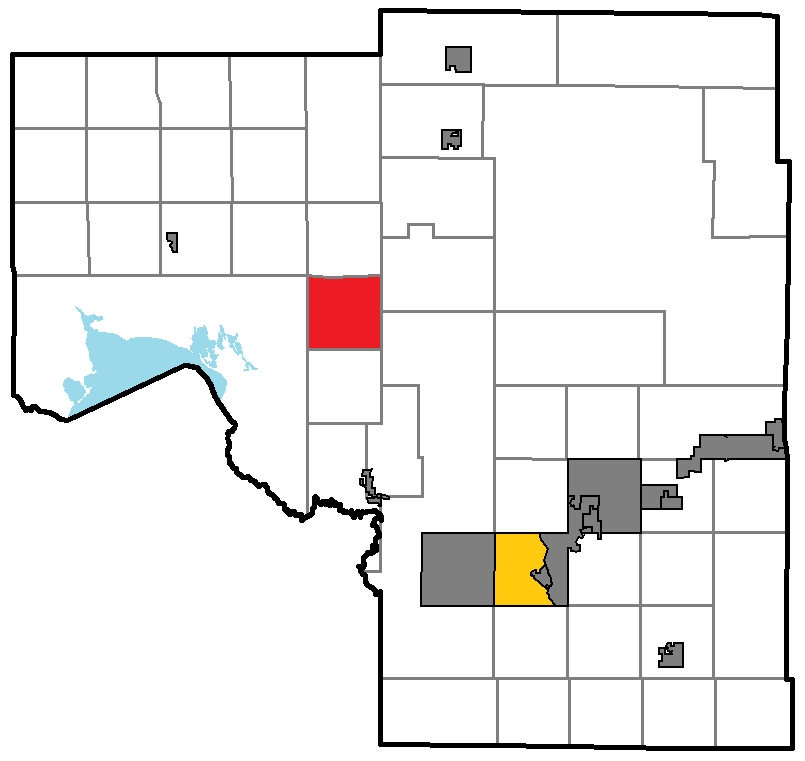
- Location of Bowstring Township, within Itasca County, Minnesota
- Coordinates: 47°33′48″N 93°50′3″W
- Country: United States
- State: Minnesota
- County: Itasca

Area
  - Total: 35.9 sq mi (93.1 km^{2})
  - Land: 26.6 sq mi (68.8 km^{2})
  - Water: 9.4 sq mi (24.3 km^{2})
- Elevation: 1,322 ft (403 m)

Population (2020)
  - Total: 212
  - Density: 7.98/sq mi (3.08/km^{2})
- Time zone: UTC-6 (Central (CST))
  - Summer (DST): UTC-5 (CDT)
- ZIP code: 56631
- Area code: 218
- FIPS code: 27-07102
- GNIS feature ID: 0663638

Bowstring Township is a township in Itasca County, Minnesota, United States. The population was 212 at the 2020 census.

Bowstring Township took its name from Bowstring Lake.

== Geography ==
According to the United States Census Bureau, the township has a total area of 36.0 square miles (93 km^{2}), of which 26.6 square miles (69 km^{2}) is land and 9.4 square miles (24 km^{2}), or 26.12%, is water.

== Demographics ==
As of the census of 2000, there were 242 people, 101 households, and 77 families living in the township. The population density was 9.1 inhabitants per square mile (3.5/km^{2}). There were 259 housing units at an average density of 9.8 per square mile (3.8/km^{2}). The racial makeup of the township was 95.87% White, 0.83% African American, 2.07% Native American, and 1.24% from two or more races.

There were 101 households, out of which 25.7% had children under the age of 18 living with them, 65.3% were married couples living together, 5.0% had a female householder with no husband present, and 22.8% were non-families. 20.8% of all households were made up of individuals, and 12.9% had someone living alone who was 65 years of age or older. The average household size was 2.40 and the average family size was 2.67.

In the township the population was spread out, with 21.1% under the age of 18, 8.3% from 18 to 24, 21.5% from 25 to 44, 29.8% from 45 to 64, and 19.4% who were 65 years of age or older. The median age was 45 years. For every 100 females, there were 106.8 males. For every 100 females age 18 and over, there were 114.6 males.

The median income for a household in the township was $31,000, and the median income for a family was $38,750. Males had a median income of $30,417 versus $17,083 for females. The per capita income for the township was $18,006. About 20.0% of families and 24.3% of the population were below the poverty line, including 48.0% of those under the age of eighteen and 9.1% of those 65 or over.
