= Grattan Township, Itasca County, Minnesota =

Grattan Township, Minnesota
- Township
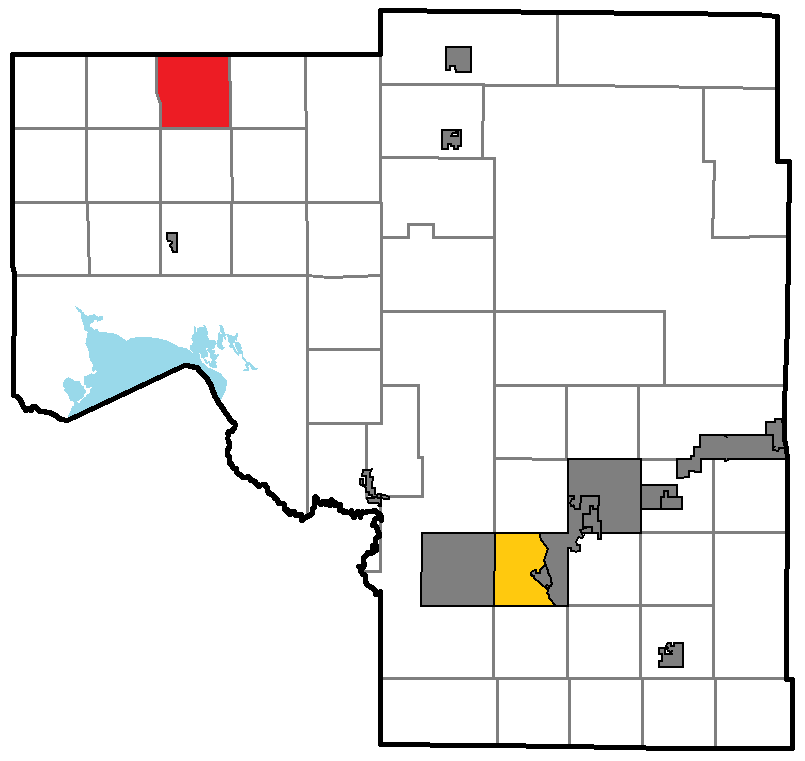
- Location of Grattan Township, within Itasca County, Minnesota
- Coordinates: 47°49′3″N 94°6′7″W
- Country: United States
- State: Minnesota
- County: Itasca

Area
  - Total: 35.6 sq mi (92.3 km^{2})
  - Land: 34.7 sq mi (90.0 km^{2})
  - Water: 0.89 sq mi (2.3 km^{2})
- Elevation: 1,335 ft (407 m)

Population (2020)
  - Total: 44
  - Density: 1.3/sq mi (0.49/km^{2})
- Time zone: UTC-6 (Central (CST))
  - Summer (DST): UTC-5 (CDT)
- FIPS code: 27-25460
- GNIS feature ID: 0664332

Grattan Township is a township in Itasca County, Minnesota, United States. The population was 44 at the 2020 census.

Grattan Township was named for Henry Grattan, an Irish politician.

== Geography ==
According to the United States Census Bureau, the township has a total area of 35.6 square miles (92 km^{2}), of which 34.8 square miles (90 km^{2}) is land and 0.9 square miles (2.3 km^{2}), or 2.44%, is water.

== Demographics ==
As of the census of 2000, there were 44 people, 16 households, and 13 families living in the township. The population density was 1.3 inhabitants per square mile (0.50/km^{2}). There were 30 housing units at an average density of 0.9 per square mile (0.35/km^{2}). The racial makeup of the township was 97.73% White, 2.27% from other races. Hispanic or Latino of any race were 2.27% of the population.

There were 16 households, out of which 43.8% had children under the age of 18 living with them, 62.5% were married couples living together, 6.3% had a female householder with no husband present, and 18.8% were non-families. 18.8% of all households were made up of individuals, and 18.8% had someone living alone who was 65 years of age or older. The average household size was 2.75 and the average family size was 3.15.

In the township the population was spread out, with 27.3% under the age of 18, 9.1% from 18 to 24, 22.7% from 25 to 44, 20.5% from 45 to 64, and 20.5% who were 65 years of age or older. The median age was 40 years. For every 100 females, there were 131.6 males. For every 100 females age 18 and over, there were 128.6 males.

The median income for a household in the township was $36,250, and the median income for a family was $40,625. Males had a median income of $6,875 versus $3,750 for females. The per capita income for the township was $21,404. There were 15.4% of families and 13.5% of the population living below the poverty line, including no under eighteens and 40.0% of those over 64.
