= Moose Township, Roseau County, Minnesota =

Township in Minnesota, United States

Moose Township
- Township
- Location of Moose Township, within Roseau County, Minnesota
- Coordinates: 48°50′45″N 96°5′6″W
- Country: United States
- State: Minnesota
- County: Roseau

Area
  - Total: 36.4 sq mi (94.4 km^{2})
  - Land: 36.4 sq mi (94.4 km^{2})
  - Water: 0 sq mi (0.0 km^{2})
- Elevation: 1,030 ft (314 m)

Population (2020)
  - Total: 103
  - Density: 2.83/sq mi (1.09/km^{2})
- Time zone: UTC-6 (Central (CST))
  - Summer (DST): UTC-5 (CDT)
- FIPS code: 27-43900
- GNIS feature ID: 665021

Moose Township is a township in Roseau County, Minnesota, United States. The population was 103 at the 2020 census.

Moose Township was named for the moose which were once abundant there.

== Geography ==
According to the United States Census Bureau, the township has a total area of 36.4 square miles (94.4 km^{2}), all land.

== Demographics ==
As of the census of 2000, there were 134 people, 48 households, and 38 families residing in the township. The population density was 3.7 people per square mile (1.4/km^{2}). There were 53 housing units at an average density of 1.5/sq mi (0.6/km^{2}). The racial makeup of the township was 100.00% White.

There were 48 households, out of which 39.6% had children under the age of 18 living with them, 70.8% were married couples living together, 2.1% had a female householder with no husband present, and 20.8% were non-families. 16.7% of all households were made up of individuals, and 10.4% had someone living alone who was 65 years of age or older. The average household size was 2.79 and the average family size was 3.18.

In the township the population was spread out, with 33.6% under the age of 18, 4.5% from 18 to 24, 28.4% from 25 to 44, 20.9% from 45 to 64, and 12.7% who were 65 years of age or older. The median age was 33 years. For every 100 females, there were 119.7 males. For every 100 females age 18 and over, there were 134.2 males.

The median income for a household in the township was $28,750, and the median income for a family was $33,125. Males had a median income of $28,750 versus $30,625 for females. The per capita income for the township was $13,419. There were 20.0% of families and 18.5% of the population living below the poverty line, including 23.1% of under eighteens and 41.2% of those over 64.
