= Reine Township, Roseau County, Minnesota =

Township in Minnesota, United States

Reine Township, Minnesota
- Township
- Location of Reine Township, within Roseau County, Minnesota
- Coordinates: 48°33′41″N 95°31′39″W
- Country: United States
- State: Minnesota
- County: Roseau

Area
  - Total: 36.2 sq mi (93.7 km^{2})
  - Land: 36.1 sq mi (93.5 km^{2})
  - Water: 0.077 sq mi (0.2 km^{2})
- Elevation: 1,207 ft (368 m)

Population (2020)
  - Total: 94
  - Density: 2.6/sq mi (1.0/km^{2})
- Time zone: UTC-6 (Central (CST))
  - Summer (DST): UTC-5 (CDT)
- FIPS code: 27-53728
- GNIS feature ID: 0665393

Reine Township is a township in Roseau County, Minnesota, United States. The population was 94 at the 2020 census.

== Geography ==
According to the United States Census Bureau, the township has a total area of 36.2 square miles (93.7 km^{2}); 36.1 square miles (93.5 km^{2}) is land and 0.1 square mile (0.2 km^{2}) (0.22%) is water.

== Demographics ==
As of the census of 2000, there were 115 people, 46 households, and 32 families residing in the township. The population density was 3.2 people per square mile (1.2/km^{2}). There were 69 housing units at an average density of 1.9/sq mi (0.7/km^{2}). The racial makeup of the township was 100.00% White. Hispanic or Latino of any race were 0.87% of the population.

There were 46 households, out of which 39.1% had children under the age of 18 living with them, 56.5% were married couples living together, and 30.4% were non-families. 26.1% of all households were made up of individuals, and 13.0% had someone living alone who was 65 years of age or older. The average household size was 2.50 and the average family size was 3.03.

In the township the population was spread out, with 27.0% under the age of 18, 6.1% from 18 to 24, 35.7% from 25 to 44, 19.1% from 45 to 64, and 12.2% who were 65 years of age or older. The median age was 38 years. For every 100 females, there were 121.2 males. For every 100 females age 18 and over, there were 121.1 males.

The median income for a household in the township was $47,188, and the median income for a family was $49,464. Males had a median income of $28,750 versus $23,250 for females. The per capita income for the township was $17,283. There were no families and 5.1% of the population living below the poverty line, including no under eighteens and none of those over 64.
