= Blackberry Township, Itasca County, Minnesota =

Blackberry Township, Minnesota
- Township
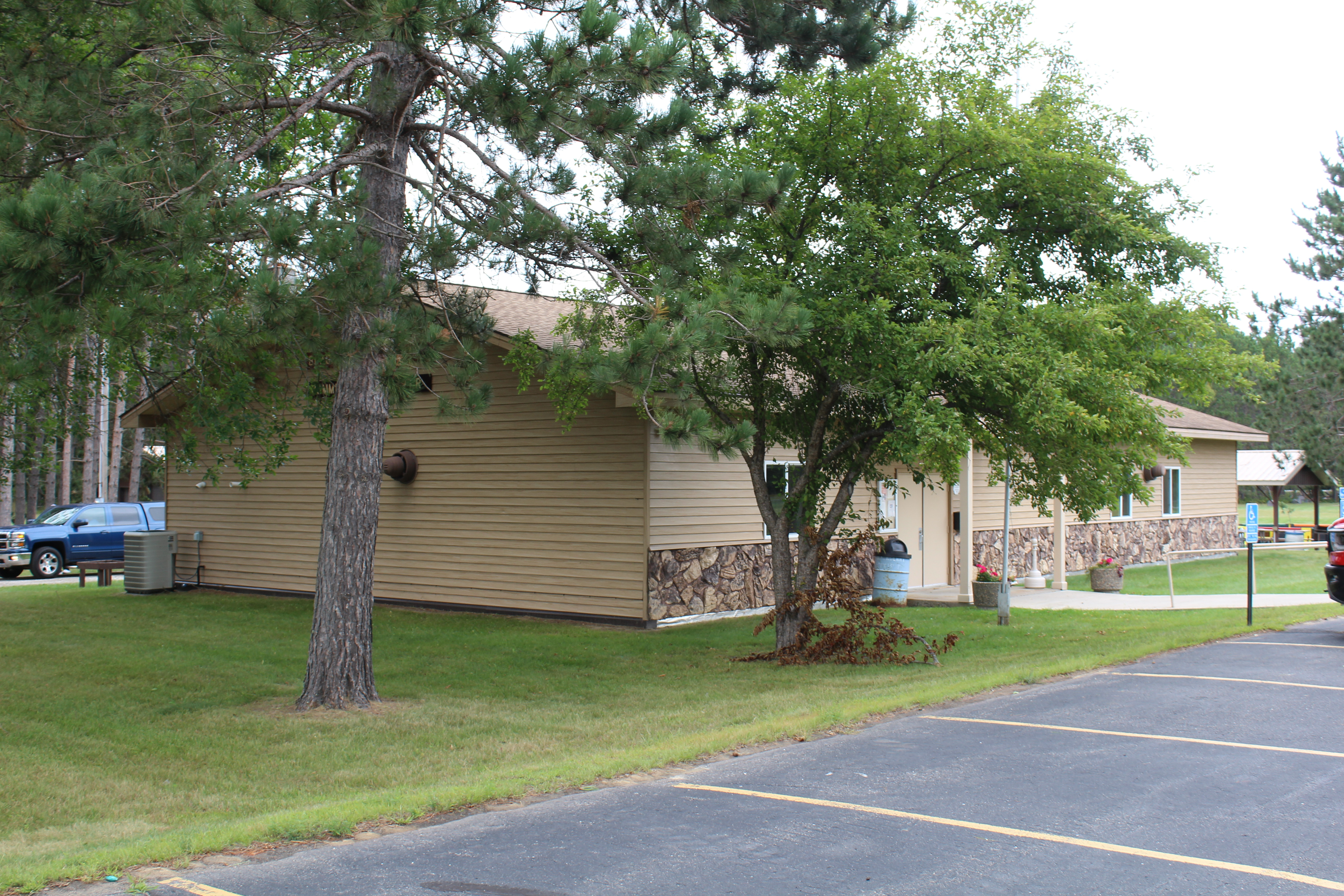
- Town hall and Community Center

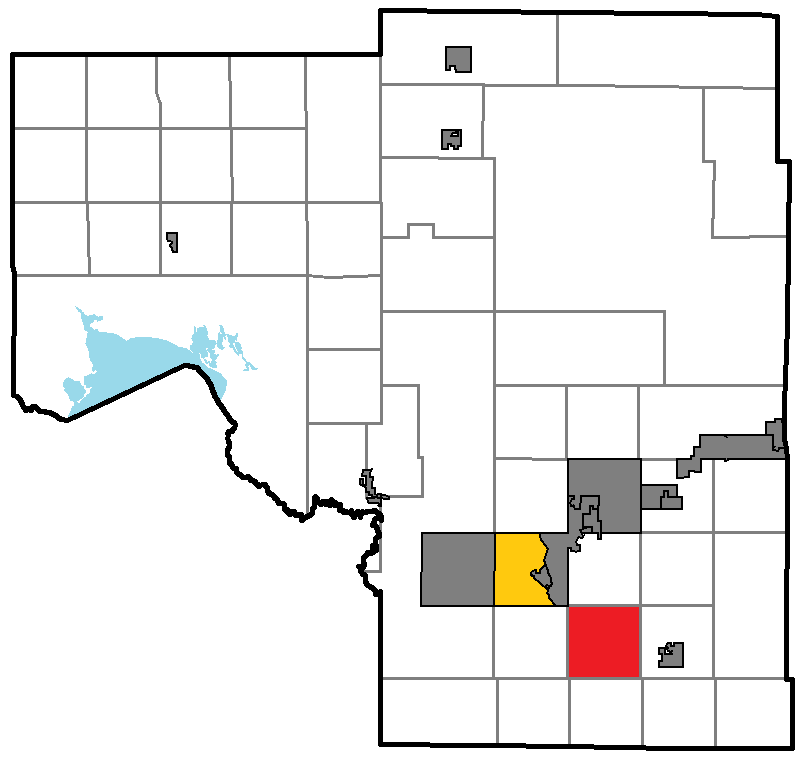
- Location of Blackberry Township, within Itasca County, Minnesota
- Coordinates: 47°10′28″N 93°24′28″W
- Country: United States
- State: Minnesota
- County: Itasca

Area
  - Total: 36.1 sq mi (93.5 km^{2})
  - Land: 35.1 sq mi (90.9 km^{2})
  - Water: 1.0 sq mi (2.7 km^{2})
- Elevation: 1,296 ft (395 m)

Population (2020)
  - Total: 827
  - Density: 23.6/sq mi (9.10/km^{2})
- Time zone: UTC-6 (Central (CST))
  - Summer (DST): UTC-5 (CDT)
- FIPS code: 27-06220
- GNIS feature ID: 0663606
- Website: https://www.blackberrytownship.com/

Blackberry Township is a township in Itasca County, Minnesota, United States. The population was 827 at the 2020 census.

== Geography ==
According to the United States Census Bureau, the township has a total area of 36.1 square miles (93 km^{2}), of which 35.1 square miles (91 km^{2}) is land and 1.0 square mile (2.6 km^{2}), or 2.85%, is water.

== Demographics ==
As of the census of 2000, there were 717 people, 273 households, and 214 families living in the township. The population density was 20.4 inhabitants per square mile (7.9/km^{2}). There were 295 housing units at an average density of 8.4 per square mile (3.2/km^{2}). The racial makeup of the township was 97.63% White, 0.42% African American, 0.84% Native American, and 1.12% from two or more races. Hispanic or Latino of any race were 0.70% of the population.

There were 273 households, out of which 32.2% had children under the age of 18 living with them, 71.4% were married couples living together, 3.3% had a female householder with no husband present, and 21.6% were non-families. 16.8% of all households were made up of individuals, and 6.6% had someone living alone who was 65 years of age or older. The average household size was 2.63 and the average family size was 2.98.

In the township the population was spread out, with 26.4% under the age of 18, 5.7% from 18 to 24, 27.9% from 25 to 44, 29.8% from 45 to 64, and 10.2% who were 65 years of age or older. The median age was 40 years. For every 100 females, there were 109.6 males. For every 100 females age 18 and over, there were 113.8 males.

The median income for a household in the township was $41,667, and the median income for a family was $46,607. Males had a median income of $38,088 versus $20,833 for females. The per capita income for the township was $15,776. About 7.8% of families and 9.9% of the population were below the poverty line, including 11.1% of those under age 18 and 12.3% of those age 65 or over.
