= Kinghurst Township, Itasca County, Minnesota =

Kinghurst Township, Minnesota
- Township
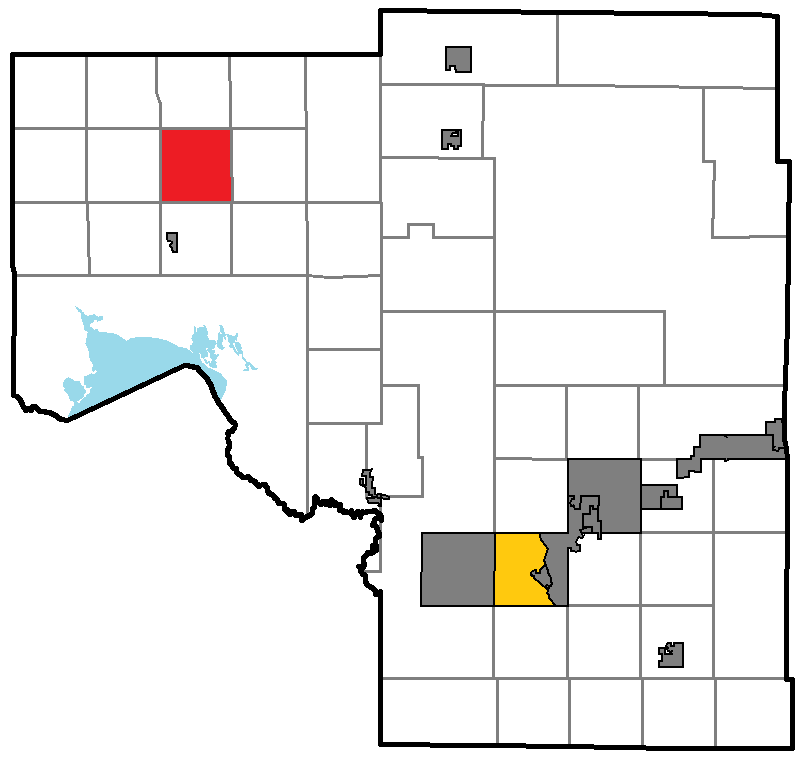
- Location of Kinghurst Township, within Itasca County, Minnesota
- Coordinates: 47°43′35″N 94°5′42″W
- Country: United States
- State: Minnesota
- County: Itasca

Area
  - Total: 35.3 sq mi (91.5 km^{2})
  - Land: 33.2 sq mi (86.0 km^{2})
  - Water: 2.1 sq mi (5.5 km^{2})
- Elevation: 1,319 ft (402 m)

Population (2020)
  - Total: 116
  - Density: 3.49/sq mi (1.35/km^{2})
- Time zone: UTC-6 (Central (CST))
  - Summer (DST): UTC-5 (CDT)
- FIPS code: 27-33272
- GNIS feature ID: 0664636

Kinghurst Township is a township in Itasca County, Minnesota, United States. The population was 116 at the 2020 census.

Kinghurst Township was named for Cyrus M. King, a county commissioner.

== Geography ==
According to the United States Census Bureau, the township has a total area of 35.3 square miles (91 km^{2}), of which 33.2 square miles (86 km^{2}) is land and 2.1 square miles (5.4 km^{2}), or 5.98%, is water.

== Demographics ==
At the 2000 census there were 131 people, 57 households, and 44 families living in the township. The population density was 3.9 people per square mile (1.5/km^{2}). There were 131 housing units at an average density of 3.9/sq mi (1.5/km^{2}). The racial makeup of the township was 93.89% White, 0.76% Native American, 1.53% from other races, and 3.82% from two or more races. Hispanic or Latino of any race were 2.29%.

There were 57 households, out of which 17.5% had children under the age of 18 living with them, 68.4% were married couples living together, 3.5% had a female householder with no husband present, and 22.8% were non-families. 19.3% of households were one person, and 7.0% were one person aged 65 or older. The average household size was 2.30 and the average family size was 2.57.

The age distribution was 16.8% under the age of 18, 3.1% from 18 to 24, 16.0% from 25 to 44, 43.5% from 45 to 64, and 20.6% 65 or older. The median age was 53 years. For every 100 females, there were 104.7 males. For every 100 females age 18 and over, there were 98.2 males.

The median household income was $25,938 and the median family income was $37,500. Males had a median income of $36,250 versus $0 for females. The per capita income for the township was $12,691. There were 6.5% of families and 7.1% of the population living below the poverty line, including no under eighteens and 3.1% of those over 64.
