= Virginia Public Schools =

School district in Minnesota, United States

Virginia School District 706 is the district that covers all Virginia, Minnesota Schools.

== Elementary School (K-3) ==
- Parkview Learning Center

== Middle School (4-6) ==
- Roosevelt Elementary School

== High School (7-12) ==
- Virginia High School
