= Strathcona, Minnesota =

City in Minnesota, United States

Strathcona
- City
- Location of Strathcona, Minnesota
- Coordinates: 48°33′13″N 96°10′5″W
- Country: United States
- State: Minnesota
- County: Roseau

Area
  - Total: 0.49 sq mi (1.28 km^{2})
  - Land: 0.49 sq mi (1.28 km^{2})
  - Water: 0 sq mi (0.00 km^{2})
- Elevation: 1,125 ft (343 m)

Population (2020)
  - Total: 25
  - Density: 50.4/sq mi (19.46/km^{2})
- Time zone: UTC-6 (Central (CST))
  - Summer (DST): UTC-5 (CDT)
- ZIP code: 56759
- Area code: 218
- FIPS code: 27-63130
- GNIS feature ID: 0652719

Strathcona is a city in Roseau County, Minnesota, United States. As of the 2020 census, Strathcona had a population of 25.

== History ==
A post office called Strathcona has been in operation since 1905. The city was named for Donald Smith, 1st Baron Strathcona and Mount Royal.

== Geography ==
According to the United States Census Bureau, the city has a total area of 0.49 square miles (1.27 km^{2}), all land.

Strathcona is located along Minnesota State Highway 32.

== Demographics ==
Historical population
Census	Pop.	Note	%±
1930	112		—
1940	114		1.8%
1950	143		25.4%
1960	64		−55.2%
1970	31		−51.6%
1980	47		51.6%
1990	40		−14.9%
2000	29		−27.5%
2010	44		51.7%
2020	25		−43.2%
U.S. Decennial Census

=== 2010 census ===
As of the census of 2010, there were 44 people, 16 households, and 10 families living in the city. The population density was 89.8 inhabitants per square mile (34.7/km^{2}). There were 18 housing units at an average density of 36.7 per square mile (14.2/km^{2}). The racial makeup of the city was 88.6% White and 11.4% from two or more races.

There were 16 households, of which 25.0% had children under the age of 18 living with them, 56.3% were married couples living together, 6.3% had a female householder with no husband present, and 37.5% were non-families. 31.3% of all households were made up of individuals, and 6.3% had someone living alone who was 65 years of age or older. The average household size was 2.75 and the average family size was 3.70.

The median age in the city was 33 years. 36.4% of residents were under the age of 18; 2.2% were between the ages of 18 and 24; 27.2% were from 25 to 44; 27.3% were from 45 to 64; and 6.8% were 65 years of age or older. The gender makeup of the city was 54.5% male and 45.5% female.

=== 2000 census ===
As of the census of 2000, there were 29 people, 16 households, and 7 families living in the city. The population density was 59.4 inhabitants per square mile (22.9/km^{2}). There were 18 housing units at an average density of 36.9 per square mile (14.2/km^{2}). The racial makeup of the city was 100.00% White.

There were 16 households, out of which 12.5% had children under the age of 18 living with them, 37.5% were married couples living together, and 56.3% were non-families. 56.3% of all households were made up of individuals, and 25.0% had someone living alone who was 65 years of age or older. The average household size was 1.81 and the average family size was 2.86.

In the city, the population was spread out, with 13.8% under the age of 18, 6.9% from 18 to 24, 37.9% from 25 to 44, 20.7% from 45 to 64, and 20.7% who were 65 years of age or older. The median age was 40 years. For every 100 females, there were 93.3 males. For every 100 females age 18 and over, there were 92.3 males.

The median income for a household in the city was $23,750, and the median income for a family was $32,500. Males had a median income of $25,000 versus $0 for females. The per capita income for the city was $12,670. None of the population and none of the families were below the poverty line.
