= Pelican Township, Otter Tail County, Minnesota =

Pelican Township, Minnesota
- Township
- Location of Pelican Township, within Otter Tail County, Minnesota

- Location within the state of Minnesota Pelican Township, Minnesota (the United States)
- Coordinates: 46°35′9″N 96°5′2″W
- Country: United States
- State: Minnesota
- County: Otter Tail

Area
  - Total: 33.2 sq mi (85.9 km^{2})
  - Land: 31.2 sq mi (80.8 km^{2})
  - Water: 1.9 sq mi (5.0 km^{2})
- Elevation: 1,352 ft (412 m)

Population (2020)
  - Total: 574
  - Density: 18.4/sq mi (7.10/km^{2})
- Time zone: UTC-6 (Central (CST))
  - Summer (DST): UTC-5 (CDT)
- FIPS code: 27-50110
- GNIS feature ID: 0665271
- Website: https://pelicanottertailmn.gov/

Pelican Township is a township in Otter Tail County, Minnesota, United States. The population was 574 at the 2020 census.

Pelican Township was organized in 1870, and named for the Pelican River.

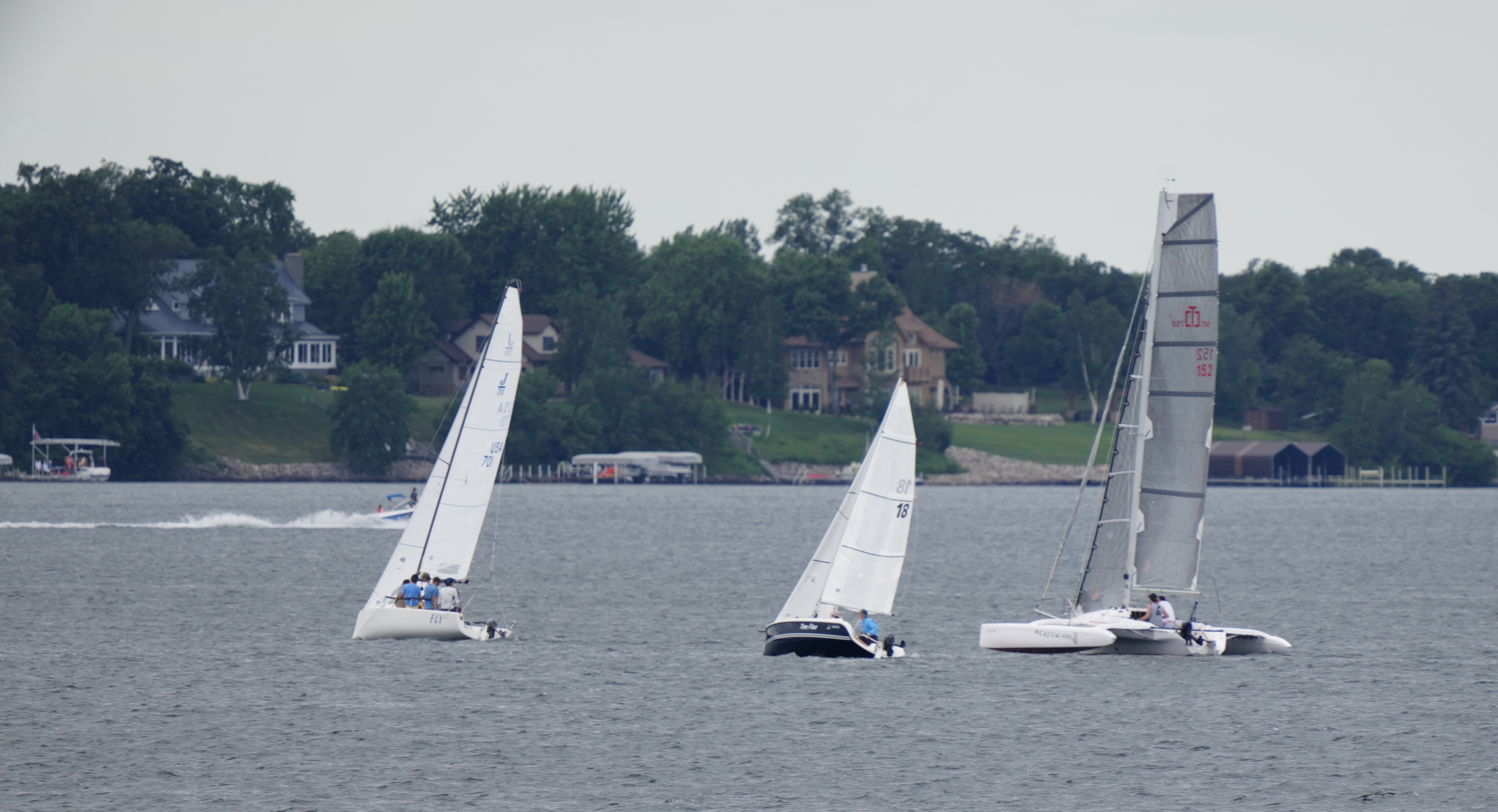
Pelican Lake, Minnesota July 3, 2022

== Geography ==
According to the United States Census Bureau, the township has a total area of 33.2 square miles (85.9 km^{2}), of which 31.2 square miles (80.9 km^{2}) is land and 2.0 square miles (5.1 km^{2}) (5.88%) is water.

== Demographics ==
As of the census of 2000, there were 831 people, 270 households, and 225 families living in the township. The population density was 26.6 inhabitants per square mile (10.3/km^{2}). There were 331 housing units at an average density of 10.6/sq mi (4.1/km^{2}). The racial makeup of the township was 85.32% White, 1.93% Native American, 0.12% Asian, 11.19% from other races, and 1.44% from two or more races. Hispanic or Latino of any race were 14.08% of the population.

There were 270 households, out of which 45.9% had children under the age of 18 living with them, 72.6% were married couples living together, 5.9% had a female householder with no husband present, and 16.3% were non-families. 13.7% of all households were made up of individuals, and 5.9% had someone living alone who was 65 years of age or older. The average household size was 3.08 and the average family size was 3.38.

In the township the population was spread out, with 34.3% under the age of 18, 6.7% from 18 to 24, 26.8% from 25 to 44, 20.6% from 45 to 64, and 11.6% who were 65 years of age or older. The median age was 35 years. For every 100 females, there were 108.3 males. For every 100 females age 18 and over, there were 107.6 males.

The median income for a household in the township was $46,058, and the median income for a family was $47,857. Males had a median income of $31,750 versus $22,250 for females. The per capita income for the township was $15,649. About 7.8% of families and 11.6% of the population were below the poverty line, including 19.9% of those under age 18 and 4.8% of those age 65 or over.
