= Red Wing Public Schools =

School district in Minnesota, United States

Location
- Red Wing, Minnesota United States

District information
- Type: Public
- Grades: Pre-K through 12
- Established: 1864
- Superintendent: Martina Wagner
- Schools: Red Wing High School Twin Bluff Middle School; Burnside Elementary; Sunnyside Elementary; Colvill Family Center; River Bluff Education Center Tower View ALC
- Budget: $35 million (2010-11)

Students and staff
- Students: 2,781
- Teachers: 165.86
- Staff: 359.46
- Student–teacher ratio: 18:1
- Athletic conference: Big 9
- District mascot: Winger Bird
- Colors: Purple and White

Other information
- Notes: 2010-2011 Fact Sheet
- Website: www.redwing.k12.mn.us

Red Wing School District #256 is a pre-K through grade 12 district located in Red Wing, Minnesota (population 16,000). Red Wing is located in the Mississippi River Valley, fifty miles southeast of the Minneapolis–Saint Paul metropolitan area.

== History ==
=== Early days (1835–1915) ===
- 1835 – Formal teaching began in Red Wing, Minnesota, at a mission house.
- 1854 – First school house building was erected at Fourth Street and East Avenue.
- 1864 – Red Wing became Special School District No. 1 of Goodhue Country, governed by a special charter granted by the legislature. This charter was amended in 1891.

The early history included the following school buildings:

South End School, 1854–1891 and 1893–1937, replaced by Hancock School Central Building, 1865–1917, replaced by Central High School West End School, 1869–1917, replaced by Jefferson School East End School, 1869–1937, replaced by Colvill School

- 1866 – Central Building was opened. Central Building offered the first year of high school in Red Wing. Central Building housed the high school from 1866 to 1917.
- 1872 – Central Building offered a four-year high school course.
- 1886 – Red Wing High School was built adjacent to Central Building.

=== Expansion and annexation (1916–1968) ===
- 1916 – Central High School was built, with additions in 1953 and 1961. In addition, Washington Elementary (adjacent to Central High) was used for additional high school space, as needed.

Jefferson Elementary School was built with additions in 1948 and 1966. Extensive remodeling was done in 1996.

- 1916 – The Class of 1923 was the first class to complete all secondary education at Central High.
- 1924-25 – The three grade schools (East End, West End and South End) were renamed: Colvill for the Civil war hero; Jefferson the president; and Hancock for Rev. W. Hancock.
- 1931 – Burnside Elementary School was built - additions in 1952, 1958 and 1967. Portable classrooms were added in 1968.
- 1937 – Colvill Elementary School was built (cost $93,000), with addition in 1966.

Hancock Elementary School was built in 1937 (cost $88,000), with extensive remodeling in 1996.

- 1955 – The school board voted to make the school district an independent district allowing them to consolidate with the 12 common school districts of Goodhue County. The new district was known as Red Wing Independent School District No. 1.
- 1957 – By order of the state commissioner of education, the Red Wing School District became Independent School district No. 256.
- 1958 – Common School District No. 551 (Wacouta formerly No. 26) was added by dissolution and annexation.
- 1960 – The Burnside District was added by consolidation.

=== Vocational Campus and Twin Bluff Middle School (1969–1991) ===
- 1969 – The Red Wing Area Vocational Technical Institute was officially designated.
- 1970 – Welch was annexed to the Red Wing School District by action of the Goodhue County Commissioners.
- 1971 – Twin Bluff Junior High was built. A pool addition was added in 1974.

Forty-five percent of the Vasa area was ordered to the Red Wing School District.
The Vocational Technical Institute was renamed Red Wing Technical College.

- 1973 – The Red Wing Technical College was built. A second campus for Red Wing Technical College was temporarily located at the former A.P. Anderson home and was known as the Tower View Campus.
- 1977 – In May, the school board approved a plan to establish a comprehensive Energy Education Center and in June, Tower View was designed as the site for the energy center.
- 1978 – The Nature Conservancy deeded 343 acres to the school district for the development of the Red Wing Energy Education Center.
- 1983 – The George A. Bergwall Arena was built adjacent to the Red Wing Technical College, utilizing private contributions. The ice arena was given to the school district.
- 1988 – The Energy Education Center was phased out and the site became known as the Red Wing Technical College and Tower View Opportunity School.
- 1989 – Twin Bluff was changed to a middle school, housing 6th, 7th and 8th grades and the name was changed to Twin Bluff Middle School. The building was updated in 1997.

=== Red Wing High School and continued growth (1992–present) ===
- 1992 – The passing of the referendum on December 8 proclaimed that the residents of Red Wing voted to build a new Burnside Elementary School and a new Red Wing High School. It featured the largest bond amount ($34.7 million: $8.1 million to Burnside and $26.6 million the Red Wing High) and drew the largest voter turnout in the history of the school district (5,803 votes were cast).
- 1993 – Technical colleges were removed from K-12 responsibility and became part of the state college governance system. Red Wing and Winona Technical Colleges were consolidated to form Red Wing/ Winona Technical College. In July 1995, the state technical, community college and state college systems merged.

At the end of the 1993-1994 school year, the old Burnside School closed and was sold to a private business, which remodeled the building.
The Wall of Honor was created at Red Wing High School to recognize accomplishments of past Red Wing graduates.

- 1994 – Colvill Elementary closed for remodeling.

The new Burnside Elementary School opened in September 1994.
Central High was vacated by the school district at the end of the 1994-1995 school year.

- 1995 – The new Red Wing High School opened in September 1995. This beautiful, state-of-the-art building featured high tech, with functionality. At the opening, the new high school housed approximately 1,200 students in grades 9–12. It is located on 222 acres about two miles south of downtown.

Colvill reopened in September 1995, and was renamed the Colvill Family Center. Colvill Family Center is a collaborative partnership between Red Wing Public Schools, Red Wing Housing and Redevelopment Authority, Three Rivers Community Action/ Head Start, Goodhue County Public Health Services, Goodhue County Social Services and Hiawatha Valley ABE.
The Technical College became part of the state college and university system.

- 1997 – The Central High School and Washington School sites were sold to Goodhue County for the building of the county Justice Center. Washington and most of Central High were demolished in 1997. The 1916 section of Central High was preserved.
- 1998 – The ownership of the Tower View Campus was transferred from the school district to a non-profit corporation known as the Anderson Center.
- 1999 – Hancock School closed in June 1999 and the building was sold to St. Joseph's Catholic Church.
- 2001 – Prairie Island Arena opened adjacent to the high school.
- 2002 – Eighteen school days were missed because of a teacher's strike.
- 2003 – Jefferson Elementary School closed after the remaining elementary schools became grade-level centers. Grades K-2 were consolidated at Sunnyside School and grades 3-5 were consolidated at Burnside School.
- 2008 – On September 9, the Red Wing community approved two referendums, which increased funding by $1,111 per student for five years. These referendums in part, replace funds that had been approved in a 2003 referendum expiring after the 2008–2009 school year.
- 2009 – Through funding sources from the Jones Family Foundation, Red Wing Public School district opened Riverbend Montessori School on Buchanan Street for children ages 3 to 6 in September. After only two years into the pilot project the program closed due to restrictions in funding and space limitations.
- 2010 – In February the School Board approved a plan to move the 8th grade from Twin Bluff Middle School to Red Wing High, and the 5th grade from Burnside Elementary to Twin Bluff. The board also approved a modified-block system for the high school consisting of eight eighty-minute periods, spread over a two-day (A day, B day) rotation, as well as eliminating study halls.

== Buildings, facilities and district programs ==
Approximately 2,500 students K-12 are educated with over 450 staff members; 200 are full or part-time teachers. Approximately 90% of the district graduates continue their education beyond high school.

=== Colvill Family Center ===
Colvill Family Center is a partnership between the school district and other county agencies. Services are offered in one location for preschool children and their families.

=== Sunnyside Elementary (grades K-1) ===
Kindergarten through 1st grade students attend classes at Sunnyside Elementary, the primary grade level center. Kindergarten is offered all day, every day.

=== Burnside Elementary (grades 2-4) ===
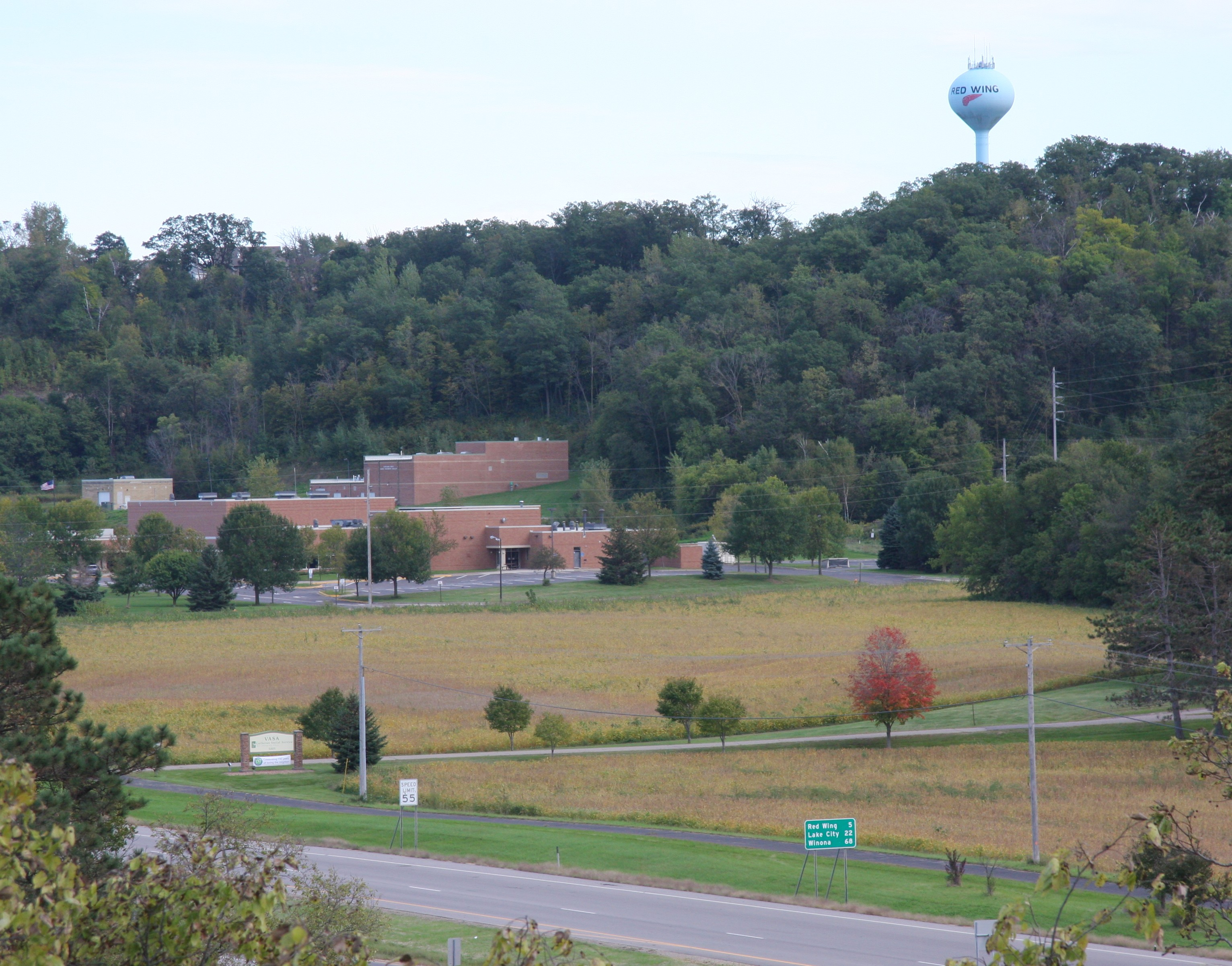
Burnside School

Burnside Elementary serves children grades two through four.

=== Twin Bluff Middle School (grades 5-7) ===
Twin Bluff Middle School uses an "instructional team" approach, dividing the student body into smaller groups to help students more easily make the transition from elementary to middle school settings. Several co-curricular activities are offered: Mathcounts, speech, yearbook and the school musical, as well as a variety of sports programs.

=== Red Wing High School (grades 8-12) ===
Red Wing High School is a comprehensive, liberal arts, public high school located on the edge of town in the Mississippi River Valley, fifty miles southeast of the Minneapolis/St. Paul metropolitan area. The school serves as the high school for Red Wing, Minnesota and surrounding communities.

As of the 2010–11 academic year, the school had an enrollment of approximately 1,200 students and 55 classroom teachers (on an FTE basis), for a student-teacher ratio of roughly 20:1. Approximately 90% of the district graduates continue their education beyond high school.

Red Wing High School is well known for its hockey team, as well as its accomplished band and chorus programs, active student council - including council regional and state-elected representatives - and the school's award-winning, nationally recognized FFA chapter. The school offers a wide variety of co-curricular, academic, arts, music and athletic programs designed to challenge the interests and abilities of all students.

=== Tower View Alternative High School (ALC) ===
Tower View Alternative Center offers programs for students between the ages of 16 and 21 who are experiencing difficulty in the traditional high school setting or have dropped out of school.

=== Community education ===
Community education programs serve people of all ages from infants through senior citizens. Community education focuses on connecting the community, schools and businesses. Programs and activities are designed to link the community and educational systems which enhance personal growth and community development.

== Students ==
=== Ethnicity ===
Students during the 2009–2010 school year:

- Total: 2,781 (100.0%)
- White: 2,335 (84%)
- Hispanic: 139 (5%)
- African American: 111 (4%)
- Asian/Pacific Islander: 55 (2%)
- Native American: 141 (5%)

=== Grade level ===
Students during the 2009–2010 school year:

- Early childhood education and pre-kindergarten: N/A
- Elementary (K-5): 1,121 (40.3%) | 619 - Burnside, 502 - Sunnyside
- Middle school (6–8): 724 (26.0%) | 724 - Twin Bluff
- High school (9–12): 936 (33.7%) | 879 - RWHS, 56 - Tower View
- Class of 2010 graduates: 202
- Total enrollment: 2,781

== See also ==
- List of school districts in Minnesota
