= Bemidji Area Schools =

School district in Minnesota, United States

Location
- Bemidji, Minnesota North Central Minnesota United States

District information
- Type: Public
- Grades: PreK–12
- Schools: 15

Students and staff
- Students: 6,200
- Teachers: 317
- District mascot: Lumberjacks
- Colors: Blue & white

Other information
- Website: Official website

Bemidji Area Schools are the schools in Independent School District 31, serving the city of Bemidji in the State of Minnesota and other communities and rural areas near Bemidji. Students from the cities of Solway, Tenstrike, Becida, Turtle River, Wilton, Puposky and portions of Cass Lake attend this school district.

The school district is one of the largest in the state, in terms of land area.

== Early Education Centers ==
- Paul Bunyan Center

== Elementary schools ==
- Lincoln Elementary- K-3
- J.W. Smith Elementary- PK-3
- Solway Elementary- K-3
- Northern Elementary- K-3
- Horace May Elementary- K-3
- Gene Dillon Elementary- 4-5

== Middle school ==
- Bemidji Middle School, Grades 6-8

== High school ==
- Bemidji High School
- Lumberjack High School
