= Trosky, Minnesota =

City in Minnesota, United States

- City
- Location of Trosky, Minnesota
- Coordinates: 43°53′16″N 96°15′03″W
- Country: United States
- State: Minnesota
- County: Pipestone
- Platted: September 1884
- Incorporated: June 10, 1893

Government
  - Type: Mayor – Council
  - Mayor: Ronald Klumper

Area
  - Total: 1.409 sq mi (3.650 km^{2})
  - Land: 1.409 sq mi (3.650 km^{2})
  - Water: 0.097 sq mi (0.251 km^{2})
- Elevation: 1,657 ft (505 m)

Population (2020)
  - Total: 98
  - Estimate (2022): 103
  - Density: 69.5/sq mi (26.85/km^{2})
- Time zone: UTC−6 (Central (CST))
  - Summer (DST): UTC−5 (CDT)
- ZIP Code: 56144
- Area code: 507
- FIPS code: 27-65542
- GNIS feature ID: 2397058
- Sales tax: 6.875%

Trosky is a city in Pipestone County, Minnesota, United States. The population was 98 at the 2020 census.

== History ==
Trosky was platted in 1884. The origin of the name Trosky is obscure. A post office has been in operation at Trosky since 1884. Trosky was incorporated on June 10, 1893.

The saloon of Trosky, one of the only places to serve alcohol in southwestern Minnesota, was criticized in the 1910s by temperance advocates in the area. In 1917, over objections from the Trosky mayor and police department, the Minnesota Commission on Public Safety placed severe restrictions on the sale of alcohol there until the commission was disbanded in 1919.

== Geography ==
According to the United States Census Bureau, the city has a total area of 1.409 square miles (3.65 km^{2}), all land.

== Demographics ==
Historical population
Census	Pop.	Note	%±
1900	215		—
1910	181		−15.8%
1920	177		−2.2%
1930	130		−26.6%
1940	167		28.5%
1950	140		−16.2%
1960	122		−12.9%
1970	109		−10.7%
1980	113		3.7%
1990	120		6.2%
2000	116		−3.3%
2010	86		−25.9%
2020	98		14.0%
2022 (est.)	103		5.1%
U.S. Decennial Census; 2020 Census

=== 2010 census ===
As of the 2010 census, there were 86 people, 39 households, and 29 families residing in the city. The population density was 52.1 inhabitants per square mile (20.1/km^{2}). There were 42 housing units at an average density of 25.5 per square mile (9.8/km^{2}). The racial makeup of the city was 95.3% White, 1.2% Native American, and 3.5% Asian.

There were 39 households, of which 25.6% had children under the age of 18 living with them, 64.1% were married couples living together, 7.7% had a female householder with no husband present, 2.6% had a male householder with no wife present, and 25.6% were non-families. 25.6% of all households were made up of individuals, and 10.3% had someone living alone who was 65 years of age or older. The average household size was 2.21 and the average family size was 2.55.

The median age in the city was 46.5 years. 20.9% of residents were under the age of 18; 2.4% were between the ages of 18 and 24; 25.6% were from 25 to 44; 36% were from 45 to 64; and 15.1% were 65 years of age or older. The gender makeup of the city was 47.7% male and 52.3% female.

=== 2000 census ===
As of the 2000 census, there were 116 people, 46 households, and 36 families residing in the city. The population density was 69.8 inhabitants per square mile (26.9/km^{2}). There were 48 housing units at an average density of 28.9 per square mile (11.2/km^{2}). The racial makeup of the city was 97.41% White and 2.59% Asian.

There were 46 households, out of which 34.8% had children under the age of 18 living with them, 67.4% were married couples living together, and 21.7% were non-families. 21.7% of all households were made up of individuals, and 13.0% had someone living alone who was 65 years of age or older. The average household size was 2.52 and the average family size was 2.92.

In the city, the population was spread out, with 28.4% under the age of 18, 2.6% from 18 to 24, 31.0% from 25 to 44, 22.4% from 45 to 64, and 15.5% who were 65 years of age or older. The median age was 42 years. For every 100 females, there were 110.9 males. For every 100 females age 18 and over, there were 102.4 males.

The median income for a household in the city was $36,250, and the median income for a family was $38,750. Males had a median income of $28,750 versus $31,250 for females. The per capita income for the city was $16,741. None of the population or the families were below the poverty line.

== Politics ==
Trosky is located in Minnesota's 7th congressional district, represented by Collin Peterson, a Democrat. At the state level, Trosky is located in Senate District 22, represented by Republican Bill Weber, and in House District 22A, represented by Republican Joe Schomacker.
