= Rockford Area Schools (Minnesota) =

School district in Minnesota, United States

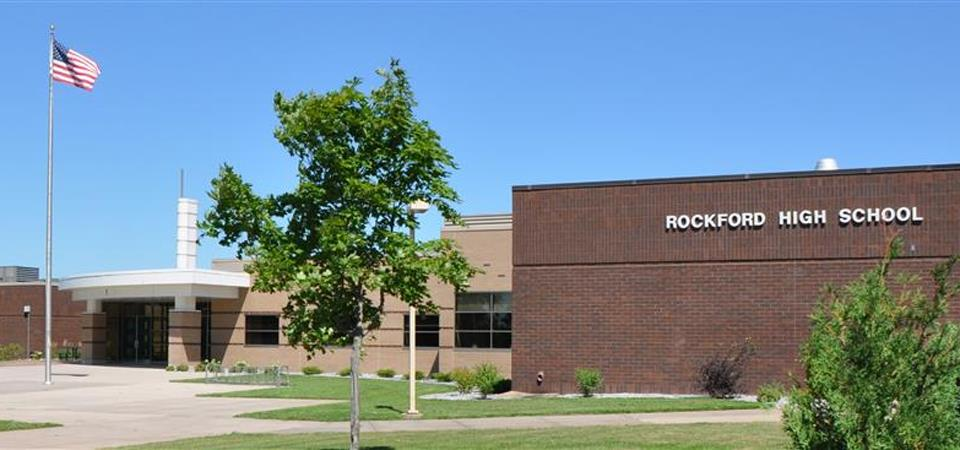
Rockford High School in 2021

Rockford School District is a school district located in Rockford, Minnesota. The district comprises three schools, Rockford Elementary Arts Magnet School, Rockford Middle School, and Rockford High School.

The district mascot is the Rockets.
