= Houston Public Schools =

School district headquartered in Houston, Minnesota, U.S.

Houston Public Schools is a school district headquartered in Houston, Minnesota, United States.

The district serves Houston and some unincorporated areas in Houston County.

== Schools ==
The district has two schools named Houston Elementary School and Houston High School; both are in Houston.
