= Southland School District =

School district in Minnesota, United States

The Southland School District, Independent School District 500, is a comprehensive community public school district in Mower County of southeastern Minnesota, United States, covering an area of approximately 200 square miles (520 km^{2}).

The district was established in 1971 by the consolidation of three previously separate school districts in Adams, Elkton and Rose Creek. Each one of the original districts operated their own elementary and high schools until 1973, when responsibilities were divided to serve grades 1–6 in Rose Creek, grades 7 and 8 in Elkton and grades 9–12 in Adams.
