= Pine Island Public Schools =

School district in Minnesota, United States

Coordinates: 44.2014°N 92.6449°W

Location
- Pine Island, Minnesota United States

District information
- Superintendent: Tamara Berg-Beniak

Students and staff
- Students: ~1200

Other information
- Website: pineisland.k12.mn.us

Pine Island Public Schools is a public school district in Pine Island, Minnesota, United States, located in the heart of the town. This school first started out in an old cabin in 1857 but was moved to its current location in 1864. All three schools, elementary, middle and high school, are located in one building with extra portable classrooms.

== History ==
This land that the school stands on was donated by Moses Jewell. A brick building was put up, costing $3000. There was an addition later that was known as the high school. The first graduation took place in 1887.

Sports included football, baseball, boys' and girls' basketball. The team was known as the Young Tigers and wore green and white uniforms. Since 1925 they are known as the Panthers, and wear maroon and gold.

In 1903 the state decided a new high school should be built. There stands in the same spot a three-story brick building. In the new gym the ceilings were too low to play basketball, so games were played at the local opera house, and later on the second floor of city hall.

In 1922 there were 93 students enrolled in the high school, but it only had a seating capacity of 72.

A year later, physical education was required by state law.

The kindergarten class was declared illegal because there was no normal department.

In 1932 the first junior-senior prom was held in city hall, which was decorated with a lot of paper and sweet peas.

The school had then become overcrowded again, so they went to rebuild. Just as they were about to start it was struck by lightning and was burned to the ground. A new building was donated as a way to thank the taxpayers.

In 1935 the band started up with just eight instruments being used by 25 members.

Hot lunch was introduced in 1938.

In 1940 the athletic fields were purchased for $1000 and new buses would take athletes around to games.

The school underwent much construction to accommodate the increasing number of students. Finally in 1971 the school was basically finished.

== Schools ==
- Pine Island High School
- Pine Island Middle School
- Pine Island Elementary

All the 3 schools of the district are located on one shared campus but each of them are still individual schools on their own.

== Athletics ==
- Hiawatha Valley League
- Minnesota State High School League
- Baseball
- Basketball
- Cross country
- Football
- Golf
- Gymnastics
- Soccer
- Softball
- Track
- Volleyball
- Wrestling

== Extracurricular activities ==
- All School Play
- Art Scream
- Culture Club
- Deca
- Environmental Club
- FCCLA
- FFA
- HVL Honor Music
- Knowledge Bowl
- Math League
- Mock Trail
- Music Listening
- National Honor Society
- One Act Play
- Panther Crew
- Peer Helpers
- Pep Band
- SADD
- Speech Team
- Student Council
- Robotics
