= Sibley East Public Schools =

School district in Minnesota, United States

Coordinates: 44°36′31″N 94°4′47″W

Sibley East Public Schools is a school district in South Central Minnesota, serving the communities of Arlington, Gaylord and Green Isle in Sibley County.

Sibley East High School and Middle School are located in Arlington. The senior high serves students in grades nine through twelve and the middle school serves students in grades six through eight. The elementary school, serving students in PreK through fifth grade, is located in Gaylord. Child care services are also available on site.

The classrooms are networked for computers to the internet as well as having communication capabilities between classrooms and school sites. This allows parents access to their child's academic progress. Every teacher has a classroom telephone so that parents are able to contact them directly.
