= Tri-County School District (Minnesota) =

School district in Minnesota, United States

Location
- Karlstad, Kittson County, Minnesota, 56732; United States
- Coordinates: 48°34′26″N 96°31′28″W

District information
- Type: Public
- Grades: PreK-12
- Established: 1905; 121 years ago
- Schools: Tri-County Secondary, Karlstad Elementary
- Budget: $3.73 million
- District ID: 2358

Students and staff
- Teachers: 19
- Staff: 41
- District mascot: Northern Freeze
- Colors: Blue and White

Other information
- Website: www.tricounty.k12.mn.us

Tri-County School District #2358 (commonly shortened to TCS) is a public school district located in northwest Minnesota, United States. The school district consists of an elementary and high school consolidated into one building located in the town of Karlstad. Tri-County School District #2358 was the result of the consolidation of three school districts: Lake Bronson School District, Karlstad School District, and Strandquist School District.

The district covers parts of Kittson, Marshall, and Roseau counties.

The enrollment for the 2021-2022 school year was 170 students, with 95 students at the elementary school level, and 75 at the high school level.

== Athletics ==
Sports teams fielded by Tri-County Schools include Football and Volleyball in the fall, Boys and Girls Basketball in winter, and Baseball, Track, and Golf in the spring. The school does not charge a fee for participating in sports, as the fee is covered by the sports boosters group. Tri-County is consolidated with Marshall County Central High School of Newfolden, Minnesota for all sports. The consolidated nickname is Northern Freeze. In the fall of 2007, the girls volleyball team, Northern Freeze, won the Section 8A Championship and participated in the Minnesota State Volleyball Tournament. The Northern Freeze lost the consolation championship game to Wheaton.
