= Holland, Minnesota =

City in Minnesota, United States

Holland
- City
- The location of Holland, Minnesota
- Coordinates: 44°05′23″N 96°11′40″W
- Country: United States
- State: Minnesota
- County: Pipestone

Government
  - Type: Mayor – Council
  - Mayor: Bernard Hubner

Area
  - Total: 0.91 sq mi (2.35 km^{2})
  - Land: 0.91 sq mi (2.35 km^{2})
  - Water: 0 sq mi (0.00 km^{2})
- Elevation: 1,772 ft (540 m)

Population (2020)
  - Total: 178
  - Density: 196.4/sq mi (75.82/km^{2})
- Time zone: UTC-6 (Central (CST))
  - Summer (DST): UTC-5 (CDT)
- ZIP code: 56139
- Area code: 507
- FIPS code: 27-29618
- GNIS feature ID: 2394400

Holland is a city located along the Rock River in Pipestone County in the U.S. state of Minnesota. Located in Pipestone County, it lies approximately eight miles from the city of Pipestone. The population was 178 at the 2020 census.

== History ==
Holland was laid out in 1888. A large share of the early settlers being natives of Holland caused the name to be selected. A post office has been in operation at Holland since 1889. Holland was incorporated in 1898.

== Geography ==
According to the United States Census Bureau, the city has a total area of 0.93 square miles (2.41 km^{2}), all land.

Minnesota State Highway 23 serves as a main route in the community.

== Demographics ==
Historical population
| Census | Pop. | Note | %± |
|---|---|---|---|
| 1900 | 255 | | — |
| 1910 | 293 | | 14.9% |
| 1920 | 318 | | 8.5% |
| 1930 | 275 | | −13.5% |
| 1940 | 303 | | 10.2% |
| 1950 | 263 | | −13.2% |
| 1960 | 264 | | 0.4% |
| 1970 | 263 | | −0.4% |
| 1980 | 234 | | −11.0% |
| 1990 | 216 | | −7.7% |
| 2000 | 215 | | −0.5% |
| 2010 | 187 | | −13.0% |
| 2020 | 178 | | −4.8% |
U.S. Decennial Census

=== 2010 census ===
As of the census of 2010, there were 187 people, 94 households, and 50 families residing in the city. The population density was 201.1 inhabitants per square mile (77.6/km^{2}). There were 110 housing units at an average density of 118.3 per square mile (45.7/km^{2}). The racial makeup of the city was 95.2% White, 0.5% Asian, 1.1% from other races, and 3.2% from two or more races. Hispanic or Latino of any race were 5.9% of the population.

There were 94 households, of which 20.2% had children under the age of 18 living with them, 39.4% were married couples living together, 10.6% had a female householder with no husband present, 3.2% had a male householder with no wife present, and 46.8% were non-families. 39.4% of all households were made up of individuals, and 16% had someone living alone who was 65 years of age or older. The average household size was 1.99 and the average family size was 2.52.

The median age in the city was 48.1 years. 17.1% of residents were under the age of 18; 4.3% were between the ages of 18 and 24; 26.2% were from 25 to 44; 26.7% were from 45 to 64; and 25.7% were 65 years of age or older. The gender makeup of the city was 52.4% male and 47.6% female.

=== 2000 census ===
As of the census of 2000, there were 215 people, 103 households, and 67 families residing in the city. The population density was 233.9 inhabitants per square mile (90.3/km^{2}). There were 112 housing units at an average density of 121.8 per square mile (47.0/km^{2}). The racial makeup of the city was 98.60% White, 0.93% Native American, and 0.47% from two or more races. Hispanic or Latino of any race were 1.40% of the population.

There were 103 households, out of which 29.1% had children under the age of 18 living with them, 50.5% were married couples living together, 8.7% had a female householder with no husband present, and 34.0% were non-families. 34.0% of all households were made up of individuals, and 18.4% had someone living alone who was 65 years of age or older. The average household size was 2.09 and the average family size was 2.62.

In the city, the population was spread out, with 22.8% under the age of 18, 3.3% from 18 to 24, 26.0% from 25 to 44, 18.1% from 45 to 64, and 29.8% who were 65 years of age or older. The median age was 44 years. For every 100 females, there were 115.0 males. For every 100 females age 18 and over, there were 104.9 males.

The median income for a household in the city was $21,058, and the median income for a family was $26,875. Males had a median income of $31,563 versus $20,313 for females. The per capita income for the city was $12,982. About 15.3% of families and 18.4% of the population were below the poverty line, including 29.5% of those under the age of eighteen and 13.2% of those 65 or over.

== Politics ==
Holland is located in Minnesota's 7th congressional district for the U.S. House of Representatives. Michelle Fischbach, a Republican, won in 2020 over longtime incumbent Collin Peterson, a member of the Democratic-Farmer-Labor.

At the state level, Holland is located in Senate District 21, represented by Republican Bill Weber, and in House District 22A, represented by Republican Joe Schomacker.
