= Hatfield, Minnesota =

City in Minnesota, United States

Hatfield
- City
- Location of Hatfield, Minnesota
- Coordinates: 43°57′17″N 96°11′26″W
- Country: United States
- State: Minnesota
- County: Pipestone

Government
  - Type: Mayor – Council
  - Mayor: Zoe Velde

Area
  - Total: 2.79 sq mi (7.23 km^{2})
  - Land: 2.79 sq mi (7.23 km^{2})
  - Water: 0 sq mi (0.00 km^{2})
- Elevation: 1,680 ft (510 m)

Population (2020)
  - Total: 53
  - Density: 19.0/sq mi (7.33/km^{2})
- Time zone: UTC-6 (Central (CST))
  - Summer (DST): UTC-5 (CDT)
- ZIP code: 56164
- Area code: 507
- FIPS code: 27-27566
- GNIS feature ID: 2394322

Hatfield is a city in Pipestone County, Minnesota, United States. As of the 2020 census, Hatfield had a population of 53.

== History ==
Hatfield was laid out in 1880. A post office was established at Hatfield in 1880, and remained in operation until 1992.

== Geography ==
According to the United States Census Bureau, the city has a total area of 2.76 square miles (7.15 km^{2}), all land.

== Demographics ==
Historical population
Census	Pop.	Note	%±
1920	99		—
1930	112		13.1%
1940	73		−34.8%
1950	110		50.7%
1960	95		−13.6%
1970	96		1.1%
1980	87		−9.4%
1990	66		−24.1%
2000	47		−28.8%
2010	54		14.9%
2020	53		−1.9%
U.S. Decennial Census

=== 2010 census ===
As of the census of 2010, there were 54 people, 20 households, and 12 families living in the city. The population density was 19.6 inhabitants per square mile (7.6/km^{2}). There were 23 housing units at an average density of 8.3 per square mile (3.2/km^{2}). The racial makeup of the city was 100.0% White.

There were 20 households, of which 40.0% had children under the age of 18 living with them, 60.0% were married couples living together, and 40.0% were non-families. 35.0% of all households were made up of individuals, and 20% had someone living alone who was 65 years of age or older. The average household size was 2.70 and the average family size was 3.67.

The median age in the city was 30.5 years. 37% of residents were under the age of 18; 7.5% were between the ages of 18 and 24; 26% were from 25 to 44; 13.1% were from 45 to 64; and 16.7% were 65 years of age or older. The gender makeup of the city was 48.1% male and 51.9% female.

=== 2000 census ===
As of the census of 2000, there were 47 people, 22 households, and 11 families living in the city. The population density was 17.0 inhabitants per square mile (6.6/km^{2}). There were 25 housing units at an average density of 9.1 per square mile (3.5/km^{2}). The racial makeup of the city was 100.00% White.

There were 22 households, out of which 18.2% had children under the age of 18 living with them, 50.0% were married couples living together, and 50.0% were non-families. 36.4% of all households were made up of individuals, and 13.6% had someone living alone who was 65 years of age or older. The average household size was 2.14 and the average family size was 3.00.

In the city, the population was spread out, with 21.3% under the age of 18, 8.5% from 18 to 24, 27.7% from 25 to 44, 34.0% from 45 to 64, and 8.5% who were 65 years of age or older. The median age was 34 years. For every 100 females, there were 88.0 males. For every 100 females age 18 and over, there were 105.6 males.

The median income for a household in the city was $25,938, and the median income for a family was $36,250. Males had a median income of $31,250 versus $16,607 for females. The per capita income for the city was $11,796. There were 28.6% of families and 26.5% of the population living below the poverty line, including 43.8% of under eighteens and none of those over 64.

== Politics ==
Hatfield is located in Minnesota's 7th congressional district, represented by Collin Peterson, a Democrat. At the state level, Hatfield is located in Senate District 22, represented by Republican Bill Weber, and in House District 22A, represented by Republican Joe Schomacker.
