= Duluth Public Schools =

School district in Minnesota, United States

Address
- 4316 Rice Lake Road Duluth, Minnesota, 55802; United States

District information
- Type: Public
- Grades: PreK–12
- NCES District ID: 2711040

Students and staff
- Students: 8,358
- Teachers: 503.51
- Staff: 580.93
- Student–teacher ratio: 16.6

Other information
- Website: www.isd709.org

Duluth Public Schools is a school district based in Duluth, Minnesota. It is also known as Independent School District (ISD) #709.

The district covers the majority of the municipality of Duluth. It also covers the majority of Rice Lake, as well as Gnesen, Lakewood, Normanna, and North Star townships.

== Schools ==
=== High schools ===
- Denfeld High School
- Duluth East High School

=== Middle schools ===
- Lincoln Park Middle School
- Ordean East Middle School

=== Elementary schools ===
- Congdon Park Elementary School
- Homecroft Elementary School
- Lakewood Elementary School
- Laura MacArthur Elementary School
- Lester Park Elementary School
- Lowell Elementary School
- Myers–Wilkins Elementary School
- Piedmont Elementary School
- Stowe Elementary School
