= Woodstock, Minnesota =

City in Minnesota, United States

- City
- Location of Woodstock, Minnesota
- Coordinates: 44°00′40″N 96°05′48″W
- Country: United States
- State: Minnesota
- County: Pipestone
- Platted: September 1879
- Incorporated: July 11, 1892

Government
  - Mayor: Austin Kruisselbrink

Area
  - Total: 0.539 sq mi (1.397 km^{2})
  - Land: 0.539 sq mi (1.397 km^{2})
  - Water: 0 sq mi (0.000 km^{2})
- Elevation: 1,821 ft (555 m)

Population (2020)
  - Total: 110
  - Estimate (2022): 110
  - Density: 203.9/sq mi (78.73/km^{2})
- Time zone: UTC−6 (Central (CST))
  - Summer (DST): UTC−5 (CDT)
- ZIP Code: 56186
- Area code: 507
- FIPS code: 27-71680
- GNIS feature ID: 2397373
- Sales tax: 6.875%

Woodstock is a city in Pipestone County, Minnesota, United States. The population was 110 at the 2020 census.

== History ==
Woodstock was platted in September 1879. The city was named after Woodstock, Illinois. A post office has been in operation at Woodstock since 1879. Woodstock was incorporated on July 11, 1892.

== Geography ==
According to the United States Census Bureau, the city has a total area of 0.539 square miles (1.40 km^{2}), all land.

== Demographics ==
Historical population
Census	Pop.	Note	%±
1900	211		—
1910	226		7.1%
1920	277		22.6%
1930	235		−15.2%
1940	253		7.7%
1950	277		9.5%
1960	213		−23.1%
1970	217		1.9%
1980	180		−17.1%
1990	159		−11.7%
2000	132		−17.0%
2010	124		−6.1%
2020	110		−11.3%
2022 (est.)	110		0.0%
U.S. Decennial Census; 2020 Census

=== 2010 census ===
As of the 2010 census, there were 124 people, 55 households, and 30 families living in the city. The population density was 238.5 inhabitants per square mile (92.1/km^{2}). There were 70 housing units at an average density of 134.6 per square mile (52.0/km^{2}). The racial makeup of the city was 98.4% White, 0.8% Native American, and 0.8% Asian.

There were 55 households, of which 27.3% had children under the age of 18 living with them, 49.1% were married couples living together, 3.6% had a female householder with no husband present, 1.8% had a male householder with no wife present, and 45.5% were non-families. 36.4% of all households were made up of individuals, and 20% had someone living alone who was 65 years of age or older. The average household size was 2.25 and the average family size was 2.90.

The median age in the city was 45 years. 20.2% of residents were under the age of 18; 8% were between the ages of 18 and 24; 21.8% were from 25 to 44; 31.5% were from 45 to 64; and 18.5% were 65 years of age or older. The gender makeup of the city was 50.0% male and 50.0% female.

=== 2000 census ===
As of the 2000 census, there were 132 people, 63 households, and 28 families living in the city. The population density was 238.3 inhabitants per square mile (92.0/km^{2}). There were 72 housing units at an average density of 130.0 per square mile (50.2/km^{2}). The racial makeup of the city was 99.24% White and 0.76% Native American.

There were 63 households, out of which 23.8% had children under the age of 18 living with them, 42.9% were married couples living together, 1.6% had a female householder with no husband present, and 54.0% were non-families. 50.8% of all households were made up of individuals, and 31.7% had someone living alone who was 65 years of age or older. The average household size was 2.08 and the average family size was 3.24.

In the city, the population was spread out, with 25.0% under the age of 18, 2.3% from 18 to 24, 31.1% from 25 to 44, 14.4% from 45 to 64, and 27.3% who were 65 years of age or older. The median age was 40 years. For every 100 females, there were 85.9 males. For every 100 females age 18 and over, there were 80.0 males.

The median income for a household in the city was $17,500, and the median income for a family was $42,500. Males had a median income of $22,083 versus $19,250 for females. The per capita income for the city was $13,269. There were no families and 5.5% of the population living below the poverty line, including no under eighteens and 9.1% of those over 64.

== Politics ==
Woodstock is located in Minnesota's 7th congressional district, represented by Collin Peterson, a Democrat. At the state level, Woodstock is located in Senate District 22, represented by Republican Bill Weber, and in House District 22A, represented by Republican Joe Schomacker.
