= Stephen-Argyle School District =

School district in Minnesota

Stephen-Argyle Central School District

Location
- Stephen and Argyle, Marshall County, Minnesota, 56757 and 56713; United States
- Coordinates: 48°27′2″N 96°52′43″W

District information
- Type: Public School
- Grades: Pre-K through 12
- Established: 1996; 29 years ago
- Superintendent: Drew Kjono

Students and staff
- Staff: 66
- Student–teacher ratio: 18.75
- Colors: Navy and Gold

Other information
- Website: www.sac.k12.mn.us

Stephen-Argyle Central School District #2856 (commonly shortened to Stephen-Argyle or SAC) is a school district located in northwest Minnesota, United States. The school district consists of the elementary located in Argyle and the high school, which is located in Stephen. Stephen-Argyle is well known for its athletics, particularly football.

== Early history ==
Before the schools of Argyle and Stephen consolidated in 1996, the schools shared faculty beginning in the early 1980s. Positions such as counselor, learning disabled instructor, and speech therapist were the first to be shared. In 1990, the elementary principal and librarian were shared. Sharing health and physical education teachers began in 1991. Plans for consolidation began during the period of 1989 to 1995 when the school boards met and public meetings were held in both cities. In 1996, the two school districts joined under the name Stephen-Argyle Central.

== Academics ==
Stephen-Argyle is notable for its outstanding scores on standardized tests. Average class sizes are 14.38 per section for kindergarten through third grade and 18.75 per section for seventh through twelfth grade. College-in-the-high-school courses are offered. The school also has its own newspaper, the Storm Watch'.

== Athletics ==
Athletics are a major part of Stephen-Argyle. In the fall, football and Volleyball is offered. Boys' and Girls' Basketball is available in winter, and Baseball, Track, and Golf in the spring. The school does not charge a fee for participating in sports. The fee is covered by the sports boosters group. The football team set a state record for most consecutive wins.
