= Westbrook-Walnut Grove School district =

School district in Minnesota, United States

Westbrook-Walnut Grove Schools

Location
- 56183 Westbrook and Walnut Grove, Minnesota United States
- Coordinates: 44.0438°N 95.4342°W

District information
- Motto: "Treat others how you want to be treated."
- Grades: PreK–12
- Established: 1989
- Superintendent: Loy Woelber
- Schools: 2
- NCES District ID: 2700183

Students and staff
- Students: 469
- Teachers: 41.25 (on FTE basis)
- Student–teacher ratio: 11.37:1
- District mascot: Chargers
- Colors: Red and Silver

Other information
- Website: www.wwgschools.org

Westbrook-Walnut Grove Public School district was formed in the early 1990s when the Westbrook Wildcats and the Walnut Grove Loggers merged to become one school district. The new mascot is the Chargers.

== Basic information ==
- Schools = One elementary school (K–6 grades) and one high school (7–12 grades)
- Elementary School is in Walnut Grove and High School is in Westbrook
- Mascot = Chargers
- School Colors = Red and Silver
- ISD No. = 2898

=== People ===
- Derrick Jenniges, Current Principal of Walnut Grove's Elementary School
- Sam Woitalewicz, Current Principal of Westbrook's High School
- Loy Woelber, Current Superintendent of WWG

== Extracurricular teams ==
All of Westbrook-Walnut Grove's Sports Teams are known as the WWG Chargers. WWG's sports/academic teams include football, baseball, softball, wrestling, knowledge bowl, robotics, track, volleyball, and basketball. WWG also has band available for grades 5–12. Chorus is required K-8 and encouraged 9–12.

== School transfer ==
Prior to 2009, there were grades K–4 held in each town. Grades 5–8 were held in Walnut Grove and grades 9–12 were held in Westbrook. Starting at the beginning of the 2009–2010 school year, grades K–6 were all being held in Walnut Grove and grades 7–12 were all being held in Westbrook.
