= Artichoke (disambiguation) =

The globe artichoke (Cynara cardunculus var. scolymus) is a species of thistle cultivated as a food. Artichoke may also refer to:

== Plants ==
- Artichoke cactus, a species of cactus
- Jerusalem artichoke, a species of sunflower with an edible tuber
- Stachys affinis, also known as Chinese artichoke or Artichoke betony, an herbaceous perennial plant of the family Lamiaceae
- Artichoke Garlic

== Places ==
- Artichoke, Minnesota, an unincorporated community in the United States
- Artichoke Lake, a lake in Minnesota
- Artichoke River, a river of Minnesota, United States
- Artichoke Township, Minnesota, a civil township in the United States

== Other uses ==
- Artichoke (band), an indie pop band in Los Angeles
- Artichoke (company), a creative company specialising in arts events
- Artichoke Creek (disambiguation)
- PH Artichoke, a designer light fixture manufactured by Louis Poulsen
- Project ARTICHOKE, a CIA operation
- Artichoke gall, a growth caused by a wasp on oak trees
