= Akron Township, Big Stone County, Minnesota =

Township in Minnesota, United States

Akron Township
- Township
- Location within the state of Minnesota Akron Township (the United States)
- Coordinates: 45°15′49″N 96°10′11″W
- Country: United States
- State: Minnesota
- County: Big Stone

Area
  - Total: 53.3 sq mi (138.0 km^{2})
  - Land: 48.6 sq mi (125.9 km^{2})
  - Water: 4.7 sq mi (12.1 km^{2})
- Elevation: 1,014 ft (309 m)

Population (2000)
  - Total: 196
  - Density: 4.1/sq mi (1.6/km^{2})
- Time zone: UTC-6 (Central (CST))
  - Summer (DST): UTC-5 (CDT)
- FIPS code: 27-00532
- GNIS feature ID: 0663392

Akron Township (/ˈækrən/ AK-rən) is a township in Big Stone County, Minnesota, United States. The population was 196 as of the 2000 census.

== History ==
Akron Township was organized in 1881. It was named after Akron, Ohio, the former hometown of first settlers.

== Geography ==
According to the United States Census Bureau, the township has a total area of 53.3 square miles (138 km^{2}), of which 48.6 square miles (126 km^{2}) is land and 4.7 square miles (12 km^{2}) (8.78%) is water.

The city of Correll is entirely within this township geographically but is a separate entity.

=== Major highways ===
- U.S. Route 12
- Minnesota State Highway 7

=== Lakes ===
- Artichoke Lake (south edge)
- Marsh Lake

=== Adjacent townships ===
- Artichoke Township (north)
- Hegbert Township, Swift County (northeast)
- Shible Township, Swift County (east)
- Appleton Township, Swift County (southeast)
- Hantho Township, Lac qui Parle County (southeast)
- Lake Shore Township, Lac qui Parle County (south)
- Agassiz Township, Lac qui Parle County (southwest)
- Odessa Township (west)

=== Cemeteries ===
The township contains Akron Cemetery.

== Demographics ==
As of the census of 2000, there were 196 people, 79 households, and 60 families residing in the township. The population density was 4.0 inhabitants per square mile (1.5/km^{2}). There were 98 housing units at an average density of 2.0 per square mile (0.77/km^{2}). The racial makeup of the township was 98.98% White, and 1.02% from two or more races.

There were 79 households, out of which 27.8% had children under the age of 18 living with them, 74.7% were married couples living together, 2.5% had a female householder with no husband present, and 22.8% were non-families. 20.3% of all households were made up of individuals, and 11.4% had someone living alone who was 65 years of age or older. The average household size was 2.48 and the average family size was 2.87.

In the township the population was spread out, with 22.4% under the age of 18, 6.1% from 18 to 24, 25.0% from 25 to 44, 23.0% from 45 to 64, and 23.5% who were 65 years of age or older. The median age was 42 years. For every 100 females, there were 115.4 males. For every 100 females age 18 and over, there were 114.1 males.

The median income for a household in the township was $29,750, and the median income for a family was $37,500. Males had a median income of $23,250 versus $20,417 for females. The per capita income for the township was $15,473. About 16.7% of families and 18.7% of the population were below the poverty line, including 34.0% of those under the age of eighteen and 11.9% of those 65 or over.
