= Moonshine Township, Big Stone County, Minnesota =

Township in Minnesota, United States

Moonshine Township
- Township
- Location within the state of Minnesota Moonshine Township (the United States)
- Coordinates: 45°32′57″N 96°17′32″W
- Country: United States
- State: Minnesota
- County: Big Stone

Area
  - Total: 37.6 sq mi (97.3 km^{2})
  - Land: 37.5 sq mi (97.2 km^{2})
  - Water: 0.039 sq mi (0.1 km^{2})
- Elevation: 1,155 ft (352 m)

Population (2000)
  - Total: 150
  - Density: 3.9/sq mi (1.5/km^{2})
- Time zone: UTC-6 (Central (CST))
  - Summer (DST): UTC-5 (CDT)
- FIPS code: 27-43828
- GNIS feature ID: 0665017

Moonshine Township is a township in Big Stone County, Minnesota, United States. The population was 150 as of the 2000 census. Moonshine Township took its name from Moonshine Lake, a lake which was so named on a night when the Moon shone brightly.

== Geography ==
According to the United States Census Bureau, the township has a total area of 37.6 square miles (97.3 km^{2}), of which 37.5 square miles (97.2 km^{2}) is land and 0.04 square miles (0.1 km^{2}) (0.08%) is water.

=== Cities, towns, villages ===
- Johnson

=== Major highway ===
- Minnesota State Highway 28

=== Lakes ===
- Moonshine Lake

=== Adjacent townships ===
- Leonardsville Township, Traverse County (north)
- Everglade Township, Stevens County (northeast)
- Baker Township, Stevens County (east)
- Malta Township (south)
- Almond Township (southwest)
- Graceville Township (west)

== Demographics ==
As of the census of 2000, there were 150 people, 55 households, and 43 families residing in the township. The population density was 4.0 people per square mile (1.5/km^{2}). There were 58 housing units at an average density of 1.5/sq mi (0.6/km^{2}). The racial makeup of the township was 92.67% White, 2.67% Native American and 4.67% Asian.

There were 55 households, out of which 34.5% had children under the age of 18 living with them, 69.1% were married couples living together, 3.6% had a female householder with no husband present, and 21.8% were non-families. 20.0% of all households were made up of individuals, and 5.5% had someone living alone who was 65 years of age or older. The average household size was 2.73 and the average family size was 3.07.

In the township the population was spread out, with 26.7% under the age of 18, 3.3% from 18 to 24, 24.7% from 25 to 44, 29.3% from 45 to 64, and 16.0% who were 65 years of age or older. The median age was 40 years. For every 100 females, there were 127.3 males. For every 100 females age 18 and over, there were 124.5 males.

The median income for a household in the township was $37,500, and the median income for a family was $39,688. Males had a median income of $26,563 versus $11,875 for females. The per capita income for the township was $15,313. There were 3.6% of families and 10.9% of the population living below the poverty line, including 13.5% of under eighteens and none of those over 64.
