= Browns Valley Township, Big Stone County, Minnesota =

Township in Minnesota, United States

Browns Valley Township
- Township
- Location within the state of Minnesota Browns Valley Township (the United States)
- Coordinates: 45°32′55″N 96°42′19″W
- Country: United States
- State: Minnesota
- County: Big Stone

Area
  - Total: 48.9 sq mi (126.6 km^{2})
  - Land: 47.6 sq mi (123.2 km^{2})
  - Water: 1.3 sq mi (3.4 km^{2})
- Elevation: 1,106 ft (337 m)

Population (2000)
  - Total: 438
  - Density: 9.3/sq mi (3.6/km^{2})
- Time zone: UTC-6 (Central (CST))
  - Summer (DST): UTC-5 (CDT)
- FIPS code: 27-08182
- GNIS feature ID: 0663683

Browns Valley Township is a township in Big Stone County, Minnesota, United States. The population was 438 as of the 2000 census.

== History ==
Browns Valley Township was organized in 1880. It was named for Joseph R. Brown.

== Geography ==
According to the United States Census Bureau, the township has a total area of 48.9 square miles (127 km^{2}), of which 47.6 square miles (123 km^{2}) is land and 1.3 square miles (3.4 km^{2}) (2.68%) is water.

=== Cities, towns, villages ===
- Beardsley

=== Major highways ===
- Minnesota State Highway 7
- Minnesota State Highway 28

=== Lakes ===
- Big Stone Lake (northwest edge)

=== Adjacent townships ===
- Arthur Township, Traverse County (north)
- Parnell Township, Traverse County (northeast)
- Toqua Township (east)
- Prior Township (southeast)
- Foster Township (south)
- Folsom Township, Traverse County (northwest)

=== Cemeteries ===
The township contains these three cemeteries: Beardsley, Midway and Saint Mary.

== Demographics ==
As of the census of 2000, there were 438 people, 183 households, and 120 families residing in the township. The population density was 9.2 people per square mile (3.6/km^{2}). There were 215 housing units at an average density of 4.5/sq mi (1.7/km^{2}). The racial makeup of the township was 99.77% White and 0.23% Native American. Hispanic or Latino of any race were 0.68% of the population.

There were 183 households, out of which 32.2% had children under the age of 18 living with them, 56.3% were married couples living together, 6.0% had a female householder with no husband present, and 34.4% were non-families. 32.8% of all households were made up of individuals, and 20.8% had someone living alone who was 65 years of age or older. The average household size was 2.39 and the average family size was 3.07.

In the township the population was spread out, with 28.1% under the age of 18, 3.9% from 18 to 24, 25.1% from 25 to 44, 22.6% from 45 to 64, and 20.3% who were 65 years of age or older. The median age was 40 years. For every 100 females, there were 90.4 males. For every 100 females age 18 and over, there were 95.7 males.

The median income for a household in the township was $28,571, and the median income for a family was $35,000. Males had a median income of $25,781 versus $18,750 for females. The per capita income for the township was $15,312. About 10.2% of families and 14.7% of the population were below the poverty line, including 22.7% of those under age 18 and 11.0% of those age 65 or over.
