= Odessa Township, Big Stone County, Minnesota =

Township in Minnesota, United States

Odessa Township
- Township
- Location within the state of Minnesota Odessa Township (the United States)
- Coordinates: 45°17′1″N 96°18′11″W
- Country: United States
- State: Minnesota
- County: Big Stone

Area
  - Total: 36.3 sq mi (94.1 km^{2})
  - Land: 35.6 sq mi (92.1 km^{2})
  - Water: 0.77 sq mi (2.0 km^{2})
- Elevation: 1,079 ft (329 m)

Population (2000)
  - Total: 147
  - Density: 4.1/sq mi (1.6/km^{2})
- Time zone: UTC-6 (Central (CST))
  - Summer (DST): UTC-5 (CDT)
- ZIP code: 56276
- Area code: 320
- FIPS code: 27-48076
- GNIS feature ID: 0665198

Odessa Township is a township in Big Stone County, Minnesota, United States. The population was 147 as of the 2000 census. Odessa Township was named after Odesa, Ukraine.

== Geography ==
According to the United States Census Bureau, the township has a total area of 36.3 square miles (94.1 km^{2}), of which 35.5 square miles (92.1 km^{2}) is land and 0.8 square miles (2.0 km^{2}) (2.12%) is water.

The city of Odessa is entirely within this township geographically but is a separate entity.

=== Major highways ===
- U.S. Route 12
- U.S. Route 75
- Minnesota State Highway 7

=== Lakes ===
- Horseshoe Lake
- Long Tom Lake (vast majority)
- Peterson Lake

=== Adjacent townships ===
- Otrey Township (north)
- Artichoke Township (northeast)
- Akron Township (east)
- Lake Shore Township, Lac qui Parle County (southeast)
- Agassiz Township, Lac qui Parle County (south)
- Yellow Bank Township, Lac qui Parle County (southwest)
- Ortonville Township (west)
- Big Stone Township (northwest)

=== Cemeteries ===
The township contains these three cemeteries: Odessa Immanuel Lutheran, Odessa Trinity Lutheran and Rest.

== Demographics ==
As of the census of 2000, there were 147 people, 61 households, and 48 families residing in the township. The population density was 4.1 people per square mile (1.6/km^{2}). There were 78 housing units at an average density of 2.2/sq mi (0.8/km^{2}). The racial makeup of the township was 100.00% White. Hispanic or Latino of any race were 0.68% of the population.

There were 61 households, out of which 26.2% had children under the age of 18 living with them, 77.0% were married couples living together, and 21.3% were non-families. 19.7% of all households were made up of individuals, and 8.2% had someone living alone who was 65 years of age or older. The average household size was 2.41 and the average family size was 2.77.

In the township the population was spread out, with 21.8% under the age of 18, 4.1% from 18 to 24, 27.2% from 25 to 44, 23.8% from 45 to 64, and 23.1% who were 65 years of age or older. The median age was 42 years. For every 100 females, there were 107.0 males. For every 100 females age 18 and over, there were 105.4 males.

The median income for a household in the township was $36,429, and the median income for a family was $38,333. Males had a median income of $32,188 versus $20,500 for females. The per capita income for the township was $17,174. There were none of the families and 2.6% of the population living below the poverty line, including no under eighteens and none of those over 64.
