= Malta Township, Big Stone County, Minnesota =

Township in Minnesota, United States

Malta Township
- Township
- Location within the state of Minnesota Malta Township (the United States)
- Coordinates: 45°26′38″N 96°18′48″W
- Country: United States
- State: Minnesota
- County: Big Stone

Area
  - Total: 37.1 sq mi (96.2 km^{2})
  - Land: 36.3 sq mi (94.0 km^{2})
  - Water: 0.85 sq mi (2.2 km^{2})
- Elevation: 1,142 ft (348 m)

Population (2000)
  - Total: 90
  - Density: 2.6/sq mi (1/km^{2})
- Time zone: UTC-6 (Central (CST))
  - Summer (DST): UTC-5 (CDT)
- FIPS code: 27-39608
- GNIS feature ID: 0664881

Malta Township is a township in Big Stone County, Minnesota, United States. The population was 90 at the 2000 census.

== History ==
Malta Township was organized in 1880. It was named directly or indirectly after the island of Malta.

== Geography ==
According to the United States Census Bureau, the township has a total area of 37.2 square miles (96.2 km^{2}), of which 36.3 square miles (94.0 km^{2}) is land and 0.9 square miles (2.2 km^{2}) (2.31%) is water.

=== Lakes ===
- Lone Tree Lake (east three-quarters)

=== Adjacent townships ===
- Moonshine Township (north)
- Baker Township, Stevens County (northeast)
- Stevens Township, Stevens County (east)
- Artichoke Township (southeast)
- Otrey Township (south)
- Big Stone Township (southwest)
- Almond Township (west)
- Graceville Township (northwest)

== Demographics ==
As of the census of 2000, there were 90 people, 29 households, and 24 families residing in the township. The population density was 2.5 people per square mile (1.0/km^{2}). There were 33 housing units at an average density of 0.9/sq mi (0.4/km^{2}). The racial makeup of the township was 100.00% White.

There were 29 households, out of which 51.7% had children under the age of 18 living with them, 79.3% were married couples living together, and 13.8% were non-families. 10.3% of all households were made up of individuals, and 6.9% had someone living alone who was 65 years of age or older. The average household size was 3.10 and the average family size was 3.40.

In the township the population was spread out, with 40.0% under the age of 18, 3.3% from 18 to 24, 31.1% from 25 to 44, 14.4% from 45 to 64, and 11.1% who were 65 years of age or older. The median age was 33 years. For every 100 females, there were 100.0 males. For every 100 females age 18 and over, there were 125.0 males.

The median income for a household in the township was $43,750, and the median income for a family was $46,000. Males had a median income of $22,500 versus $21,875 for females. The per capita income for the township was $11,949. There were 2.2% of the population living below the poverty line; within this group there were no families, no under eighteens and none over 64.
