= Artichoke Township, Big Stone County, Minnesota =

Township in Minnesota, United States

Artichoke Township
- Township
- Location within the state of Minnesota Artichoke Township (the United States)
- Coordinates: 45°22′47″N 96°10′43″W
- Country: United States
- State: Minnesota
- County: Big Stone

Area
  - Total: 35.6 sq mi (92.1 km^{2})
  - Land: 32.2 sq mi (83.5 km^{2})
  - Water: 3.3 sq mi (8.6 km^{2})
- Elevation: 1,080 ft (330 m)

Population (2000)
  - Total: 84
  - Density: 2.6/sq mi (1/km^{2})
- Time zone: UTC-6 (Central (CST))
  - Summer (DST): UTC-5 (CDT)
- FIPS code: 27-02350
- GNIS feature ID: 0663463

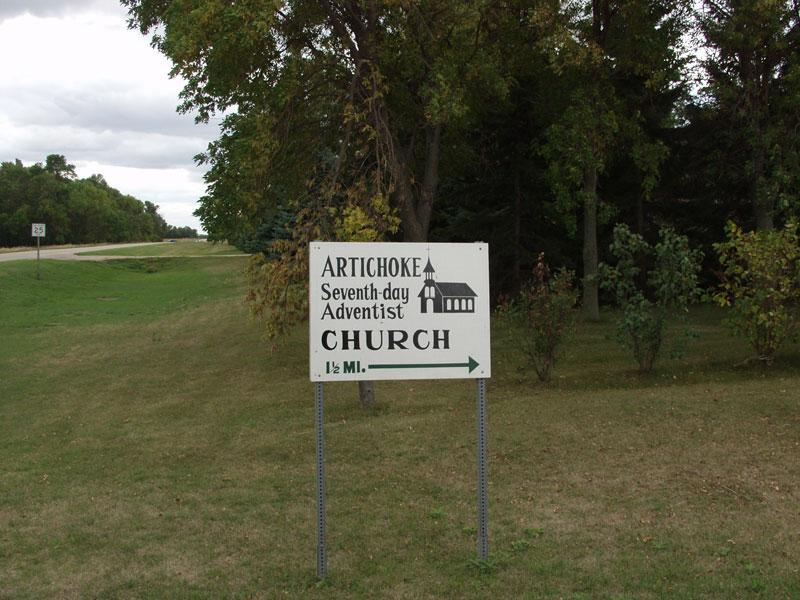
The only sign bearing the name of Artichoke, Minnesota

Artichoke Township is a township in Big Stone County, Minnesota, United States. The population was 84 as of the 2000 census. Artichoke is also the name of an unincorporated hamlet within Artichoke Township.

== History ==
The first white settlement was made at Artichoke Township in 1869. Artichoke Township took its name from Artichoke Lake.

== Geography ==
According to the United States Census Bureau, the township has a total area of 35.6 square miles (92 km^{2}), of which 32.2 square miles (83 km^{2}) is land and 3.3 square miles (8.5 km^{2}) (9.39%) is water.

=== Unincorporated town ===
- Artichoke at 45.39913°N 96.157553°W

(This list is based on USGS data and may include former settlements.)

=== Lakes ===
- Artichoke Lake (vast majority)
- Long Lake

=== Adjacent townships ===
- Stevens Township, Stevens County (north)
- Synnes Township, Stevens County (northeast)
- Hegbert Township, Swift County (east)
- Shible Township, Swift County (southeast)
- Akron Township (south)
- Odessa Township (southwest)
- Otrey Township (west)
- Malta Township (northwest)

=== Cemeteries ===
The township contains these three cemeteries: Artichoke Baptist, Artichoke Lake and Johnson Family.

== Demographics ==
As of the census of 2000, there were 84 people, 31 households, and 23 families residing in the township. The population density was 2.6 people per square mile (1.0/km^{2}). There were 54 housing units at an average density of 1.7/sq mi (0.6/km^{2}). The racial makeup of the township was 100.00% White.

There were 31 households, out of which 35.5% had children under the age of 18 living with them, 74.2% were married couples living together, and 22.6% were non-families. 19.4% of all households were made up of individuals, and 9.7% had someone living alone who was 65 years of age or older. The average household size was 2.71 and the average family size was 3.17.

In the township the population was spread out, with 32.1% under the age of 18, 2.4% from 18 to 24, 31.0% from 25 to 44, 22.6% from 45 to 64, and 11.9% who were 65 years of age or older. The median age was 38 years. For every 100 females, there were 115.4 males. For every 100 females age 18 and over, there were 111.1 males.

The median income for a household in the township was $27,500, and the median income for a family was $27,813. Males had a median income of $20,893 versus $13,750 for females. The per capita income for the township was $12,471. There were 5.3% of families and 13.2% of the population living below the poverty line, including 36.8% of under eighteens and none of those over 64.
