= Toqua =

Toqua may refer to:

- Toqua Township, Big Stone County, Minnesota
- Toqua (Tennessee), a prehistoric and historic Native American site in Monroe County, Tennessee, home to a substantial pre-Cherokee town and later an Overhill Cherokee village, now submerged by Tellico Lake
