= Ortonville Township, Big Stone County, Minnesota =

Township in Minnesota, United States

Ortonville Township
- Township
- Location within the state of Minnesota
- Coordinates: 45°18′12″N 96°26′25″W
- Country: United States
- State: Minnesota
- County: Big Stone

Area
  - Total: 18.6 sq mi (48.3 km^{2})
  - Land: 17.6 sq mi (45.5 km^{2})
  - Water: 1.1 sq mi (2.8 km^{2})
- Elevation: 1,066 ft (325 m)

Population (2010)
  - Total: 2,011
  - Density: 114/sq mi (44.2/km^{2})
- Time zone: UTC-6 (Central (CST))
  - Summer (DST): UTC-5 (CDT)
- ZIP code: 56278
- Area code: 320
- FIPS code: 27-48724
- GNIS feature ID: 0665221

Ortonville Township is a township in Big Stone County, Minnesota, United States. The population was 2,011 as of the 2010 census.

== History ==
The first white settlement at Ortonville Township was made in the early 1870s. It was named for Cornelius Knute Orton, an early settler.

== Geography ==
According to the United States Census Bureau, the township has a total area of 18.6 square miles (48.3 km^{2}), of which 17.6 square miles (45.5 km^{2}) is land and 1.1 square miles (2.8 km^{2}), or 5.73%, is water.

=== Cities, towns, villages ===
- Ortonville (vast majority)

=== Unincorporated towns ===
- Cashtown at 45.298576°N 96.439223°W

(This list is based on USGS data and may include former settlements.)

=== Major highways ===
- U.S. Route 12
- U.S. Route 75
- Minnesota State Highway 7

=== Lakes ===
- Big Stone Lake (east edge)
- Lindgren Lake
- Munnwyler Lake
- Walter Lake

=== Adjacent townships ===
- Big Stone Township (north)
- Otrey Township (northeast)
- Odessa Township (east)
- Yellow Bank Township, Lac qui Parle County (south)

=== Cemeteries ===
The township contains Mound Cemetery.

== Demographics ==
As of the census of 2000, there were 2,287 people, 977 households, and 635 families residing in the township. The population density was 131.1 inhabitants per square mile (50.6/km^{2}). There were 1,189 housing units at an average density of 68.2 per square mile (26.3/km^{2}). The racial makeup of the township was 97.77% White, 0.39% African American, 0.83% Native American, 0.09% Asian, 0.31% from other races, and 0.61% from two or more races. Hispanic or Latino of any race were 0.57% of the population.

There were 977 households, out of which 28.0% had children under the age of 18 living with them, 54.7% were married couples living together, 7.7% had a female householder with no husband present, and 35.0% were non-families. 33.1% of all households were made up of individuals, and 20.0% had someone living alone who was 65 years of age or older. The average household size was 2.26 and the average family size was 2.87.

In the township the population was spread out, with 23.8% under the age of 18, 5.1% from 18 to 24, 20.1% from 25 to 44, 24.8% from 45 to 64, and 26.2% who were 65 years of age or older. The median age was 46 years. For every 100 females, there were 85.9 males. For every 100 females age 18 and over, there were 81.6 males.

The median income for a household in the township was $30,000, and the median income for a family was $38,486. Males had a median income of $30,250 versus $20,101 for females. The per capita income for the township was $16,873. About 6.8% of families and 9.3% of the population were below the poverty line, including 9.2% of those under age 18 and 9.1% of those age 65 or over.
