= Otrey Township, Big Stone County, Minnesota =

Township in Minnesota, United States

Otrey Township
- Township
- Location within the state of Minnesota Otrey Township (the United States)
- Coordinates: 45°21′54″N 96°19′2″W
- Country: United States
- State: Minnesota
- County: Big Stone

Area
  - Total: 37.1 sq mi (96.2 km^{2})
  - Land: 34.1 sq mi (88.3 km^{2})
  - Water: 3.1 sq mi (7.9 km^{2})
- Elevation: 1,086 ft (331 m)

Population (2000)
  - Total: 104
  - Density: 3.1/sq mi (1.2/km^{2})
- Time zone: UTC-6 (Central (CST))
  - Summer (DST): UTC-5 (CDT)
- FIPS code: 27-49120
- GNIS feature ID: 0665236

Otrey Township is a township in Big Stone County, Minnesota, United States. The population was 104 as of the 2000 census.

== History ==
Otrey Township was organized in 1880. It was named for brothers Thomas and William Otrey, early settlers.

== Geography ==
According to the United States Census Bureau, the township has a total area of 37.1 square miles (96.2 km^{2}), of which 34.1 square miles (88.3 km^{2}) is land and 3.0 square miles (7.9 km^{2}) (8.21%) is water.

=== Lakes ===
- Bentsen Lake (east half)
- Long Tom Lake (northeast edge)
- Olson Lake
- Otrey Lake

=== Adjacent townships ===
- Malta Township (north)
- Stevens Township, Stevens County (northeast)
- Artichoke Township (east)
- Odessa Township (south)
- Ortonville Township (southwest)
- Big Stone Township (west)
- Almond Township (northwest)

=== Cemeteries ===
The township contains these three cemeteries: Eids, Eidskog and Maple.

== Demographics ==
As of the census of 2000, there were 104 people, 35 households, and 29 families residing in the township. The population density was 3.1 people per square mile (1.2/km^{2}). There were 42 housing units at an average density of 1.2/sq mi (0.5/km^{2}). The racial makeup of the township was 100.00% White.

There were 35 households, out of which 40.0% had children under the age of 18 living with them, 80.0% were married couples living together, and 17.1% were non-families. 14.3% of all households were made up of individuals, and 8.6% had someone living alone who was 65 years of age or older. The average household size was 2.97 and the average family size was 3.31.

In the township the population was spread out, with 31.7% under the age of 18, 5.8% from 18 to 24, 22.1% from 25 to 44, 24.0% from 45 to 64, and 16.3% who were 65 years of age or older. The median age was 41 years. For every 100 females, there were 121.3 males. For every 100 females age 18 and over, there were 115.2 males.

The median income for a household in the township was $32,143, and the median income for a family was $31,667. Males had a median income of $26,250 versus $20,000 for females. The per capita income for the township was $11,589. There were no families and 3.7% of the population living below the poverty line, including no under eighteens and none of those over 64.

History of Otrey Township As Told By Nellie Otrey McLane 1873–1958

William Otrey was born in Somerset, England, coming to America when he was four years old. He and his brother Thomas enlisted in the army during the Civil War. After the war, they took their mustering out pay coming to Chicago where they invested in trappers outfits. Setting out from there they trapped their way to Kandiyohi where they spent the winter with an English family named Hart trapping and working for their board.

They arrived in Big Stone County just two days after the Ole Bolsta family and found a location to their liking on the shores of the lake that still bears their name. Long Tom Lake was named by William for his brother, Tom. They continued their trapping operations very successfully taking their furs to the Green Leaf store east of Litchfield, MN for it was there they received the best prices. Their supplies were also hauled from this store.

The next year Mrs. Otrey came to live here. Mr. Otrey helped new settlers set traps and taught them the ways of living on the prairie. Some said that had it not been for Mr. Otrey they might have starved.

A group of friendly God-fearing Indians lived in the grove near the Otreys during the winters. They were peaceful and good neighbors. Once they invited the white family to one of their services. It was not customary for them to invite white people to take part in their activities, but they spoke of Mr. Otrey as God's man and asked him to sing for them. He was glad to comply and sang the hymn “O Happy Day.”

The Otreys were not particularly anxious that the township be named for them. At first it was called Trenton because one of the settlers had come from a town named Trenton. However, William Campbell felt that it should be named for the Otreys because they had settled their first and it was through his efforts that the name was changed.
