= Big Stone Township, Big Stone County, Minnesota =

Township in Minnesota, United States

Big Stone Township
- Township
- Location within the state of Minnesota Big Stone Township (the United States)
- Coordinates: 45°22′42″N 96°26′30″W
- Country: United States
- State: Minnesota
- County: Big Stone

Area
  - Total: 34.4 sq mi (89.1 km^{2})
  - Land: 30.3 sq mi (78.4 km^{2})
  - Water: 4.1 sq mi (10.7 km^{2})
- Elevation: 1,129 ft (344 m)

Population (2000)
  - Total: 253
  - Density: 8.3/sq mi (3.2/km^{2})
- Time zone: UTC-6 (Central (CST))
  - Summer (DST): UTC-5 (CDT)
- FIPS code: 27-05788
- GNIS feature ID: 0663590

Big Stone Township is a township in Big Stone County, Minnesota, United States. The population was 253 at the 2000 census.

== History ==
Big Stone Township was organized in 1879. It took its name from Big Stone Lake.

== Geography ==
According to the United States Census Bureau, the township has a total area of 34.4 square miles (89 km^{2}), of which 30.3 square miles (78 km^{2}) is land and 4.1 square miles (11 km^{2}) (12.03%) is water.

=== Cities, towns, villages ===
- Ortonville (north edge)

=== Unincorporated town ===
- Lagoona Beach at 45.3663534°N 96.4856139°W

(This list is based on USGS data and may include former settlements.)

=== Major highways ===
- U.S. Route 75
- Minnesota State Highway 7

=== Lakes ===
- Bentsen Lake (west half)
- Big Stone Lake (east quarter)
- Deep Lake
- Lysing Lake (south edge)
- Moulton Lake
- Mundwiler Lake
- Olson Lake
- Swenson Lake
- Twin Lakes

=== Adjacent townships ===
- Almond Township (north)
- Malta Township (northeast)
- Otrey Township (east)
- Odessa Township (southeast)
- Ortonville Township (south)
- Prior Township (northwest)

=== Cemeteries ===
The township contains Big Stone Baptist Cemetery.

== Demographics ==
As of the census of 2000, there were 253 people, 105 households, and 82 families residing in the township. The population density was 8.4 people per square mile (3.2/km^{2}). There were 183 housing units at an average density of 6.0/sq mi (2.3/km^{2}). The racial makeup of the township was 99.60% White and 0.40% African American.

There were 105 households, out of which 23.8% had children under the age of 18 living with them, 70.5% were married couples living together, 1.9% had a female householder with no husband present, and 21.9% were non-families. 21.0% of all households were made up of individuals, and 10.5% had someone living alone who was 65 years of age or older. The average household size was 2.41 and the average family size was 2.76.

In the township the population was spread out, with 20.2% under the age of 18, 4.7% from 18 to 24, 21.7% from 25 to 44, 26.5% from 45 to 64, and 26.9% who were 65 years of age or older. The median age was 49 years. For every 100 females, there were 105.7 males. For every 100 females age 18 and over, there were 108.2 males.

The median income for a household in the township was $38,750, and the median income for a family was $42,083. Males had a median income of $28,438 versus $23,125 for females. The per capita income for the township was $17,856. About 3.4% of families and 5.5% of the population were below the poverty line, including 7.1% of those under the age of eighteen and 3.8% of those 65 or over.
