= Artichoke Creek =

Artichoke Creek may refer to:

- Artichoke Creek (Minnesota)
- Artichoke Creek (South Dakota)
