= Toqua Township, Big Stone County, Minnesota =

Township in Minnesota, United States

Toqua Township
- Township
- Location within the state of Minnesota Toqua Township (the United States)
- Coordinates: 45°33′3″N 96°34′33″W
- Country: United States
- State: Minnesota
- County: Big Stone

Area
  - Total: 35.1 sq mi (90.9 km^{2})
  - Land: 33.7 sq mi (87.4 km^{2})
  - Water: 1.4 sq mi (3.5 km^{2})
- Elevation: 1,109 ft (338 m)

Population (2000)
  - Total: 87
  - Density: 2.6/sq mi (1/km^{2})
- Time zone: UTC-6 (Central (CST))
  - Summer (DST): UTC-5 (CDT)
- FIPS code: 27-65200
- GNIS feature ID: 0665797

Toqua Township is a township in Big Stone County, Minnesota, United States. The population was 87 as of the 2000 census.

== History ==
Toqua Township was organized in 1880. It took its name from the nearby Toqua lakes.

== Geography ==
According to the United States Census Bureau, the township has a total area of 35.1 square miles (90.9 km^{2}), of which 33.8 square miles (87.4 km^{2}) is land and 1.4 square miles (3.5 km^{2}) (3.85%) is water.

The city of Barry is entirely within this township geographically but is a separate entity.

=== Major highway ===
- Minnesota State Highway 28

=== Lakes ===
- Barry Lake
- Clear Lake
- Fogarty Lake

=== Adjacent townships ===
- Parnell Township, Traverse County (north)
- Tara Township, Traverse County (northeast)
- Graceville Township (east)
- Almond Township (southeast)
- Prior Township (south)
- Foster Township (southwest)
- Browns Valley Township (west)

== Demographics ==
As of the census of 2000, there were 87 people, 29 households, and 22 families residing in the township. The population density was 2.6 people per square mile (1.0/km^{2}). There were 32 housing units at an average density of 0.9/sq mi (0.4/km^{2}). The racial makeup of the township was 98.85% White, and 1.15% from two or more races.

There were 29 households, out of which 41.4% had children under the age of 18 living with them, 58.6% were married couples living together, 10.3% had a female householder with no husband present, and 20.7% were non-families. 20.7% of all households were made up of individuals, and 10.3% had someone living alone who was 65 years of age or older. The average household size was 3.00 and the average family size was 3.52.

In the township the population was spread out, with 35.6% under the age of 18, 3.4% from 18 to 24, 21.8% from 25 to 44, 19.5% from 45 to 64, and 19.5% who were 65 years of age or older. The median age was 40 years. For every 100 females, there were 97.7 males. For every 100 females age 18 and over, there were 107.4 males.

The median income for a household in the township was $38,333, and the median income for a family was $53,750. Males had a median income of $45,625 versus $28,750 for females. The per capita income for the township was $16,155. There were 10.5% of families and 17.9% of the population living below the poverty line, including 21.9% of under eighteens and 16.7% of those over 64.
