= Prior Township, Big Stone County, Minnesota =

Township in Minnesota, United States

Prior Township
- Township
- Location within the state of Minnesota Prior Township (the United States)
- Coordinates: 45°26′25″N 96°32′43″W
- Country: United States
- State: Minnesota
- County: Big Stone

Area
  - Total: 47.9 sq mi (124.1 km^{2})
  - Land: 44.5 sq mi (115.3 km^{2})
  - Water: 3.4 sq mi (8.8 km^{2})
- Elevation: 1,150 ft (350 m)

Population (2000)
  - Total: 223
  - Density: 4.9/sq mi (1.9/km^{2})
- Time zone: UTC-6 (Central (CST))
  - Summer (DST): UTC-5 (CDT)
- FIPS code: 27-52576
- GNIS feature ID: 0665360

Prior Township is a township in Big Stone County, Minnesota, United States. The population was 223 as of the 2000 census.

== History ==
Prior Township was organized in 1879. It was named for Charles H. Prior, a railroad official.

== Geography ==
According to the United States Census Bureau, the township has a total area of 47.9 square miles (124.1 km^{2}), of which 44.5 square miles (115.3 km^{2}) is land and 3.4 square miles (8.8 km^{2}) (7.08%) is water.

=== Major highway ===
- Minnesota State Highway 7

=== Lakes ===
- Big Stone Lake (east quarter)

=== Adjacent townships ===
- Toqua Township (north)
- Graceville Township (northeast)
- Almond Township (east)
- Big Stone Township (southeast)
- Foster Township (west)
- Browns Valley Township (northwest)

=== Cemeteries ===
The township contains these five cemeteries: Bailey, Elim, Lakeside, Mills and West Saint Paul.

== Demographics ==
As of the census of 2000, there were 223 people, 79 households, and 62 families residing in the township. The population density was 5.0 people per square mile (1.9/km^{2}). There were 265 housing units at an average density of 6.0/sq mi (2.3/km^{2}). The racial makeup of the township was 95.96% White, 3.59% Asian, and 0.45% from two or more races.

There were 79 households, out of which 32.9% had children under the age of 18 living with them, 73.4% were married couples living together, 1.3% had a female householder with no husband present, and 20.3% were non-families. 17.7% of all households were made up of individuals, and 10.1% had someone living alone who was 65 years of age or older. The average household size was 2.82 and the average family size was 3.21.

In the township the population was spread out, with 26.5% under the age of 18, 5.8% from 18 to 24, 20.6% from 25 to 44, 28.7% from 45 to 64, and 18.4% who were 65 years of age or older. The median age was 43 years. For every 100 females, there were 118.6 males. For every 100 females age 18 and over, there were 107.6 males.

The median income for a household in the township was $31,667, and the median income for a family was $32,500. Males had a median income of $26,250 versus $15,833 for females. The per capita income for the township was $11,741. About 11.1% of families and 21.5% of the population were below the poverty line, including 37.7% of those under the age of eighteen and none of those 65 or over.
