= Foster Township, Big Stone County, Minnesota =

Township in Minnesota, United States

Foster Township
- Township
- Location within the state of Minnesota Foster Township (the United States)
- Coordinates: 45°27′54″N 96°40′13″W
- Country: United States
- State: Minnesota
- County: Big Stone

Area
  - Total: 33.2 sq mi (86.0 km^{2})
  - Land: 30.0 sq mi (77.8 km^{2})
  - Water: 3.1 sq mi (8.1 km^{2})
- Elevation: 1,102 ft (336 m)

Population (2000)
  - Total: 123
  - Density: 4.1/sq mi (1.6/km^{2})
- Time zone: UTC-6 (Central (CST))
  - Summer (DST): UTC-5 (CDT)
- FIPS code: 27-22058
- GNIS feature ID: 0664205

Foster Township is a township in Big Stone County, Minnesota, United States. The population was estimated at 110 in the 2020 census. Situated in the southwest region of the county, the township has a western boundary with South Dakota. Big Stone Lake and the Little Minnesota River drain it.

== Geography ==
According to the United States Census Bureau, the township has a total area of 33.2 square miles (86 km^{2}), of which 30.1 square miles (78 km^{2}) is land and 3.1 square miles (8.0 km^{2}) (9.43%) is water.

=== Unincorporated towns ===
- Bonanza Grove at 45.445518°N 96.709511°W
- Foster at 45.416352°N 96.675899°W
- Yankeetown at 45.491073°N 96.740068°W

(This list is based on USGS data and may include former settlements.)

=== Major highway ===
- Minnesota State Highway 7

=== Lakes ===
- Big Stone Lake (northwest quarter)

=== Adjacent townships ===
- Browns Valley Township (north)
- Toqua Township (northeast)
- Prior Township (east)

=== Cemeteries ===
The township contains two cemeteries, Holden and Lakeside.

== Demographics ==
At the 2000 census, there were 123 people, 57 households and 42 families residing in the township. The population density was 4.1 per square mile (1.6/km^{2}). There were 169 housing units at an average density of 5.6/sq mi (2.2/km^{2}). The racial makeup of the township was 98.37% White and 1.63% Asian.

There were 57 households, of which 15.8% had children under the age of 18 living with them, 70.2% were married couples living together, and 26.3% were non-families. 24.6% of all households were made up of individuals, and 7.0% had someone living alone who was 65 years of age or older. The average household size was 2.16, and the average family size was 2.50.

15.4% of the population were under the age of 18, 5.7% from 18 to 24, 15.4% from 25 to 44, 40.7% from 45 to 64, and 22.8% were 65 years of age or older. The median age was 52 years. For every 100 females, there were 141.2 males. For every 100 females age 18 and over, there were 126.1 males.

The median household income was $31,875 and the median family income was $41,250. Males had a median income of $22,500 and females $22,083. The per capita income was $16,178. There were 17.5% of families and 18.4% of the population living below the poverty line, including 19.0% of those under eighteen and none of those over 64.
