= Graceville Township, Big Stone County, Minnesota =

Township in Minnesota, United States

Graceville Township
- Township
- Location within the state of Minnesota Graceville Township (the United States)
- Coordinates: 45°32′46″N 96°25′18″W
- Country: United States
- State: Minnesota
- County: Big Stone

Area
  - Total: 34.9 sq mi (90.5 km^{2})
  - Land: 32.9 sq mi (85.2 km^{2})
  - Water: 2.0 sq mi (5.3 km^{2})
- Elevation: 1,122 ft (342 m)

Population (2000)
  - Total: 205
  - Density: 6.2/sq mi (2.4/km^{2})
- Time zone: UTC-6 (Central (CST))
  - Summer (DST): UTC-5 (CDT)
- ZIP code: 56240
- Area code: 320
- FIPS code: 27-24776
- GNIS feature ID: 0664305

Graceville Township is a township in Big Stone County, Minnesota, United States. The population was 205 as of the 2000 census. Graceville Township took its name from the city of Graceville, which was named for Thomas Langdon Grace, second Roman Catholic Bishop of Saint Paul, Minnesota.

== Geography ==
According to the United States Census Bureau, the township has a total area of 34.9 square miles (90 km^{2}), of which 32.9 square miles (85 km^{2}) is land and 2.0 square miles (5.2 km^{2}) (5.87%) is water.

The city of Graceville is entirely within this township geographically but is a separate entity.

=== Unincorporated town ===
- Big Stone Colony at 45.529130°N 96.474227°W

(This list is based on USGS data and may include former settlements.)

=== Major highways ===
- U.S. Route 75
- Minnesota State Highway 28

=== Lakes ===
- E Toqua Lake
- Lannon Lake
- Lake Leo
- S Rothwell Lake (north edge)
- Smithwicks Lake
- W Toqua Lake

=== Adjacent townships ===
- Tara Township, Traverse County (north)
- Leonardsville Township, Traverse County (northeast)
- Moonshine Township (east)
- Malta Township (southeast)
- Almond Township (south)
- Prior Township (southwest)
- Toqua Township (west)

=== Cemeteries ===
The township contains these two cemeteries: Big Stone Hutterite Colony and Graceville.

== Demographics ==
As of the census of 2000, there were 205 people, 54 households, and 48 families residing in the township. The population density was 6.2 people per square mile (2.4/km^{2}). There were 62 housing units at an average density of 1.9/sq mi (0.7/km^{2}). The racial makeup of the township was 100.00% White.

There were 54 households, out of which 48.1% had children under the age of 18 living with them, 88.9% were married couples living together, and 9.3% were non-families. 9.3% of all households were made up of individuals, and 7.4% had someone living alone who was 65 years of age or older. The average household size was 3.80 and the average family size was 4.08.

In the township the population was spread out, with 39.5% under the age of 18, 8.8% from 18 to 24, 22.4% from 25 to 44, 19.0% from 45 to 64, and 10.2% who were 65 years of age or older. The median age was 26 years. For every 100 females, there were 89.8 males. For every 100 females age 18 and over, there were 103.3 males.

The median income for a household in the township was $25,833, and the median income for a family was $24,750. Males had a median income of $25,625 versus $23,750 for females. The per capita income for the township was $7,826. About 36.4% of families and 43.9% of the population were below the poverty line, including 50.6% of those under the age of eighteen and none of those 65 or over.
