= Lagoona Beach, Minnesota =

Unincorporated community in Minnesota, US

Lagoona Beach
- Unincorporated community
- Location within Minnesota Location within the United States
- Coordinates: 45°21′59″N 96°29′08″W
- Country: United States
- State: Minnesota
- County: Big Stone
- Elevation: 971 ft (296 m)
- Time zone: UTC-6 (Central (CST))
  - Summer (DST): UTC-5 (CDT)
- Area code: 320
- GNIS feature ID: 646320

Lagoona Beach is an unincorporated community in Big Stone Township, Big Stone County, Minnesota, United States.
