= Ortonville Public School =

School district in Minnesota, United States

Ortonville School District #2903, operating as Ortonville Public School or Ortonville Public Schools, is a school district headquartered in Ortonville, Minnesota. The district is subdivided into Knoll Elementary School and Ortonville High School.

In Big Stone County it serves Ortonville and Odessa. In Lac qui Parle County it serves Bellingham.

== History ==
In 2009 the Bellingham School District merged into the Ortonville district. Under Minnesota law it was a consolidation.
