= Big Stone Colony, Minnesota =

Unincorporated community in Minnesota, US

Big Stone Colony
- Unincorporated community
- Location within Minnesota Location within the United States
- Coordinates: 45°31′45″N 96°28′27″W
- Country: United States
- State: Minnesota
- County: Big Stone
- Elevation: 1,125 ft (343 m)
- Time zone: UTC-6 (Central (CST))
  - Summer (DST): UTC-5 (CDT)
- Area code: 320
- GNIS feature ID: 640133

Big Stone Colony is an unincorporated community in Graceville Township, Big Stone County, Minnesota, United States,
