= Johnson, Minnesota =

City in Minnesota, United States

- City
- Location of Johnson, Minnesota
- Coordinates: 45°34′20″N 96°17′39″W
- Country: United States
- State: Minnesota
- County: Big Stone
- Incorporated: 1903

Government
  - Mayor: Donald E. Johnsrud

Area
  - Total: 0.310 sq mi (0.804 km^{2})
  - Land: 0.310 sq mi (0.804 km^{2})
  - Water: 0 sq mi (0.000 km^{2})
- Elevation: 1,129 ft (344 m)

Population (2020)
  - Total: 24
  - Estimate (2023): 23
  - Density: 77.3/sq mi (29.85/km^{2})
- Time zone: UTC−6 (Central (CST))
  - Summer (DST): UTC−5 (CDT)
- ZIP Code: 56236
- Area code: 320
- FIPS code: 27-32012
- GNIS feature ID: 2395472
- Sales tax: 8.125%

Johnson is a city in Big Stone County, Minnesota, United States. The population was 24 at the 2020 census.

== Geography ==
According to the United States Census Bureau, the city has a total area of 0.310 square miles (0.80 km^{2}), all land.

Minnesota State Highway 28 serves as a main route in the community.

== Demographics ==
Historical population
| Census | Pop. | Note | %± |
|---|---|---|---|
| 1910 | 192 | | — |
| 1920 | 100 | | −47.9% |
| 1930 | 96 | | −4.0% |
| 1940 | 101 | | 5.2% |
| 1950 | 54 | | −46.5% |
| 1960 | 64 | | 18.5% |
| 1970 | 53 | | −17.2% |
| 1980 | 57 | | 7.5% |
| 1990 | 46 | | −19.3% |
| 2000 | 32 | | −30.4% |
| 2010 | 29 | | −9.4% |
| 2020 | 24 | | −17.2% |
| 2023 (est.) | 23 | | −4.2% |
U.S. Decennial Census; 2020 Census

=== 2010 census ===
As of the 2010 census, there were 29 people, 15 households, and 9 families living in the city. The population density was 96.7 inhabitants per square mile (37.3/km^{2}). There were 17 housing units at an average density of 56.7 per square mile (21.9/km^{2}). The racial makeup of the city was 100.0% White. Hispanic or Latino of any race were 3.4% of the population.

There were 15 households, of which 13.3% had children under the age of 18 living with them, 60.0% were married couples living together, and 40.0% were non-families. 33.3% of all households were made up of individuals, and 13.4% had someone living alone who was 65 years of age or older. The average household size was 1.93 and the average family size was 2.44.

The median age in the city was 57.3 years. 13.8% of residents were under the age of 18; 0.0% were between the ages of 18 and 24; 13.7% were from 25 to 44; 55.1% were from 45 to 64; and 17.2% were 65 years of age or older. The gender makeup of the city was 44.8% male and 55.2% female.

=== 2000 census ===
As of the 2000 census, there were 32 people, 16 households, and 9 families living in the city. The population density was 103.7 inhabitants per square mile (40.0/km^{2}). There were 16 housing units at an average density of 51.9 per square mile (20.0/km^{2}). The racial makeup of the city was 100.00% White.

There were 16 households, out of which 18.8% had children under the age of 18 living with them, 50.0% were married couples living together, 6.3% had a female householder with no husband present, and 43.8% were non-families. 37.5% of all households were made up of individuals, and 6.3% had someone living alone who was 65 years of age or older. The average household size was 2.00 and the average family size was 2.67.

In the city, the population was spread out, with 9.4% under the age of 18, 9.4% from 18 to 24, 15.6% from 25 to 44, 53.1% from 45 to 64, and 12.5% who were 65 years of age or older. The median age was 49 years. For every 100 females, there were 146.2 males. For every 100 females age 18 and over, there were 141.7 males.

The median income for a household in the city was $38,125, and the median income for a family was $39,375. Males had a median income of $28,750 versus $9,375 for females. The per capita income for the city was $20,759. There were no families and 5.4% of the population living below the poverty line, including no under eighteens and none of those over 64.
