= Bonanza Grove, Minnesota =

Unincorporated community in Minnesota, US

Bonanza Grove
- Unincorporated community
- Location within Minnesota Location within the United States
- Coordinates: 45°26′44″N 96°42′34″W
- Country: United States
- State: Minnesota
- County: Big Stone
- Elevation: 1,053 ft (321 m)
- Time zone: UTC-6 (Central (CST))
  - Summer (DST): UTC-5 (CDT)
- Area code: 320
- GNIS feature ID: 640358

Bonanza Grove is an unincorporated community in Foster Township, Big Stone County, Minnesota, United States.
