= Almond Township, Big Stone County, Minnesota =

Township in Minnesota, United States

Almond Township
- Township
- Location within the state of Minnesota Almond Township (the United States)
- Coordinates: 45°27′20″N 96°26′12″W
- Country: United States
- State: Minnesota
- County: Big Stone

Area
  - Total: 34.8 sq mi (90.1 km^{2})
  - Land: 33.2 sq mi (86.0 km^{2})
  - Water: 1.6 sq mi (4.2 km^{2})
- Elevation: 1,138 ft (347 m)

Population (2000)
  - Total: 190
  - Density: 5.7/sq mi (2.2/km^{2})
- Time zone: UTC-6 (Central (CST))
  - Summer (DST): UTC-5 (CDT)
- FIPS code: 27-01126
- GNIS feature ID: 0663417

Almond Township is a township in Big Stone County, Minnesota, United States. The population was 190 as of the 2000 census. Almond Township was organized in 1880.

== Geography ==
According to the United States Census Bureau, the township has a total area of 34.8 square miles (90 km^{2}), of which 33.2 square miles (86 km^{2}) is land and 1.6 square miles (4.1 km^{2}) (4.63%) is water.

The city of Clinton is entirely within this township geographically but is a separate entity.

=== Major highway ===
- U.S. Route 75

=== Lakes ===
- Cup Lake
- Eli Lake (south three-quarters)
- Lone Tree Lake (west quarter)
- Lysing Lake (vast majority)
- S Rothwell Lake (vast majority)

=== Adjacent townships ===
- Graceville Township (north)
- Moonshine Township (northeast)
- Malta Township (east)
- Otrey Township (southeast)
- Big Stone Township (south)
- Prior Township (west)
- Toqua Township (northwest)

=== Cemeteries ===
The township contains these three cemeteries: Clinton, Long Island and Saint Pauli.

== Demographics ==
As of the census of 2000, there were 190 people, 61 households, and 42 families residing in the township. The population density was 5.7 people per square mile (2.2/km^{2}). There were 67 housing units at an average density of 2.0/sq mi (0.8/km^{2}). The racial makeup of the township was 100.00% White. Hispanic or Latino of any race were 1.05% of the population.

There were 61 households, out of which 34.4% had children under the age of 18 living with them, 63.9% were married couples living together, 1.6% had a female householder with no husband present, and 31.1% were non-families. 29.5% of all households were made up of individuals, and 16.4% had someone living alone who was 65 years of age or older. The average household size was 2.61 and the average family size was 3.29.

In the township the population was spread out, with 25.3% under the age of 18, 3.7% from 18 to 24, 20.5% from 25 to 44, 20.5% from 45 to 64, and 30.0% who were 65 years of age or older. The median age was 46 years. For every 100 females, there were 86.3 males. For every 100 females age 18 and over, there were 86.8 males.

The median income for a household in the township was $43,750, and the median income for a family was $48,438. Males had a median income of $31,042 versus $18,125 for females. The per capita income for the township was $16,141. None of the families and 8.0% of the population were living below the poverty line, including no under eighteens and 28.6% of those over 64.
