= Barry, Minnesota =

City in Minnesota, United States

- City
- Location of Barry, Minnesota
- Coordinates: 45°33′30″N 96°33′37″W
- Country: United States
- State: Minnesota
- County: Big Stone
- Incorporated: 1900

Government
  - Mayor: Danika Gary

Area
  - Total: 0.253 sq mi (0.656 km^{2})
  - Land: 0.253 sq mi (0.656 km^{2})
  - Water: 0 sq mi (0.000 km^{2})
- Elevation: 1,106 ft (337 m)

Population (2020)
  - Total: 16
  - Estimate (2023): 15
  - Density: 63/sq mi (24.4/km^{2})
- Time zone: UTC−6 (Central (CST))
  - Summer (DST): UTC−5 (CDT)
- ZIP Code: 56210
- Area code: 320
- FIPS code: 27-03718
- GNIS feature ID: 2394071
- Sales tax: 6.875%

Barry is a city in northern Big Stone County, Minnesota, United States. The population was 16 at the 2020 census.

Minnesota State Highway 28 serves as a main route in the community.

== History ==
Barry was named for the Barry brothers, early settlers.

== Geography ==
According to the United States Census Bureau, the city has a total area of 0.253 square miles (0.66 km^{2}), all land.

== Demographics ==
Historical population
Census	Pop.	Note	%±
1910	105		—
1920	107		1.9%
1930	74		−30.8%
1940	116		56.8%
1950	74		−36.2%
1960	60		−18.9%
1970	52		−13.3%
1980	43		−17.3%
1990	40		−7.0%
2000	25		−37.5%
2010	16		−36.0%
2020	16		0.0%
2023 (est.)	15		−6.2%
U.S. Decennial Census; 2020 Census

=== 2010 census ===
As of the 2010 census, there were 16 people, 6 households, and 6 families living in the city. The population density was 64.0 inhabitants per square mile (24.7/km^{2}). There were 15 housing units at an average density of 60.0 per square mile (23.2/km^{2}). The racial makeup of the city was 100.0% White.

There were 6 households, of which 33.3% had children under the age of 18 living with them, 83.3% were married couples living together, and 16.7% had a male householder with no wife present. 0.0% of all households were made up of individuals. The average household size was 2.67 and the average family size was 2.50.

The median age in the city was 50.5 years. 12.5% of residents were under the age of 18; 12.6% were between the ages of 18 and 24; 18.9% were from 25 to 44; 37.5% were from 45 to 64; and 18.8% were 65 years of age or older. The gender makeup of the city was 50.1% male and 49.9% female.

=== 2000 census ===
As of the 2000 census, there were 25 people, 12 households, and 6 families living in the city. The population density was 101.3 inhabitants per square mile (39.1/km^{2}). There were 17 housing units at an average density of 68.9 per square mile (26.6/km^{2}). The racial makeup of the city was 100.00% White.

There were 12 households, out of which 16.7% had children under the age of 18 living with them, 50.0% were married couples living together, and 41.7% were non-families. 41.7% of all households were made up of individuals, and none had someone living alone who was 65 years of age or older. The average household size was 2.08 and the average family size was 2.86.

In the city, the population was spread out, with 20.0% under the age of 18, 16.0% from 18 to 24, 4.0% from 25 to 44, 48.0% from 45 to 64, and 12.0% who were 65 years of age or older. The median age was 51 years. For every 100 females, there were 127.3 males. For every 100 females age 18 and over, there were 100.0 males.

The median income for a household in the city was $18,250, and the median income for a family was $19,250. Males had a median income of $0 versus $0 for females. The per capita income for the city was $7,124. There were no families and 19.0% of the population living below the poverty line, including no under eighteens and none of those over 64.
