= Artichoke (band) =

American indie pop band

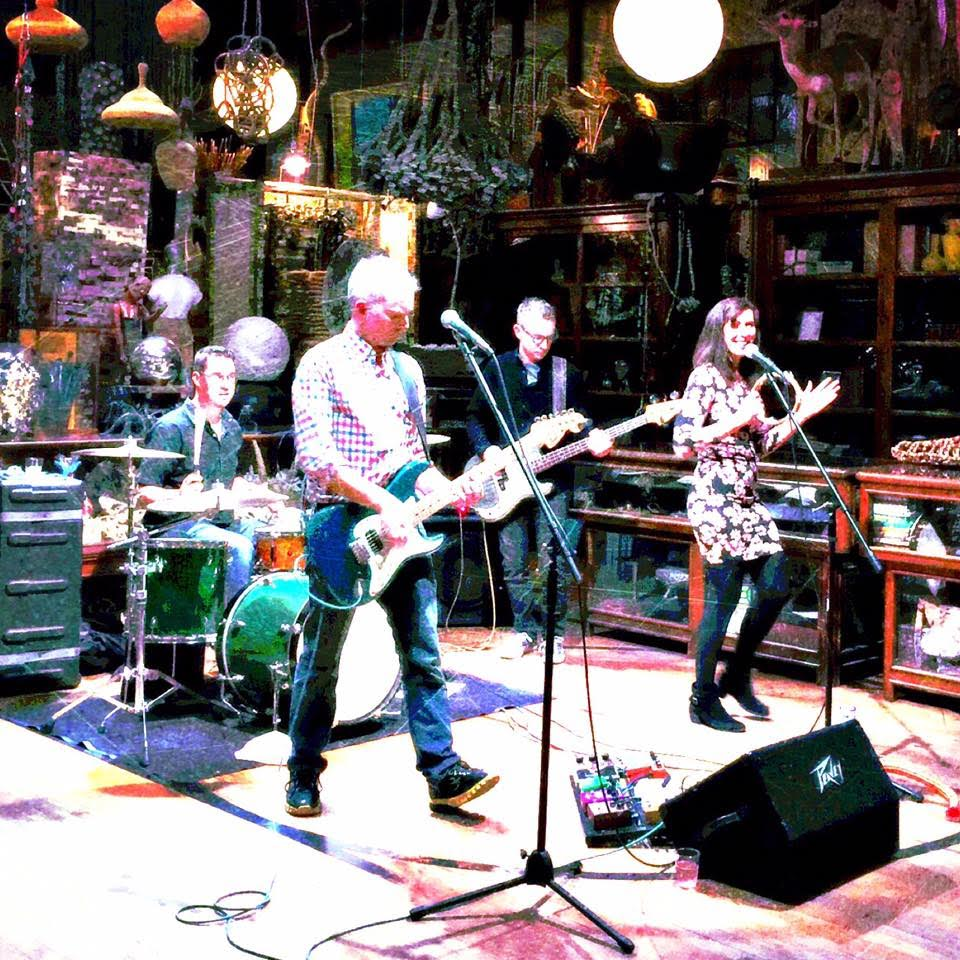

Artichoke is an indie pop band in Los Angeles. Formed in 1999 by Timothy Sellers, the band is best known for their concept albums.

In 2005, Artichoke’s “26 Scientists: Volume One Anning - Malthus” was featured in the science section of the “New York Times” in an article about the emerging songs-of-science micro-niche, as spearheaded by such artists as They Might Be Giants and Tom Lehrer.

In 2010, Lisa Carver of the “LA Weekly” wrote about Artichoke’s family album “26 Animals” and described their sound as “music for kids and drunks.”

In 2011 Sellers was the songwriter in residence for NIMBioS, National Institute for Mathematical and Biological Synthesis.

In March 2018, “Echoes”, an album including ten stylistically tweaked cover songs, reached #71 on north American college radio.

== Discography ==
- Artichoke (2025)
- Highland Park 2 (2021)
- Echoes (2018)
- Etchy Sketchy Skies (2012)
- Bees (2010)
- 26 Animals (2009)
- Historic Highland Park (2009)
- 26 Scientists, Volume Two: Newton - Zeno (2009)
- Nevermind the Bollocks here’s Artichoke (2006)
- 26 Scientists, Volume One: Anning - Malthus (2005)
- 20 Grit (2004)
- Evaporation (2002)
- Sing in Traffic (2001)
- Golden Eyelids (2000)
