= Artichoke Creek (South Dakota) =

Stream in South Dakota, U.S.

Coordinates: 44°53′10″N 100°21′43″W

Artichoke Creek is a stream in the U.S. state of South Dakota.

Artichoke Creek was named on account of the wild artichokes along its course.

== See also ==
- List of rivers of South Dakota
