= Odessa, Minnesota =

City in Minnesota, United States

- City
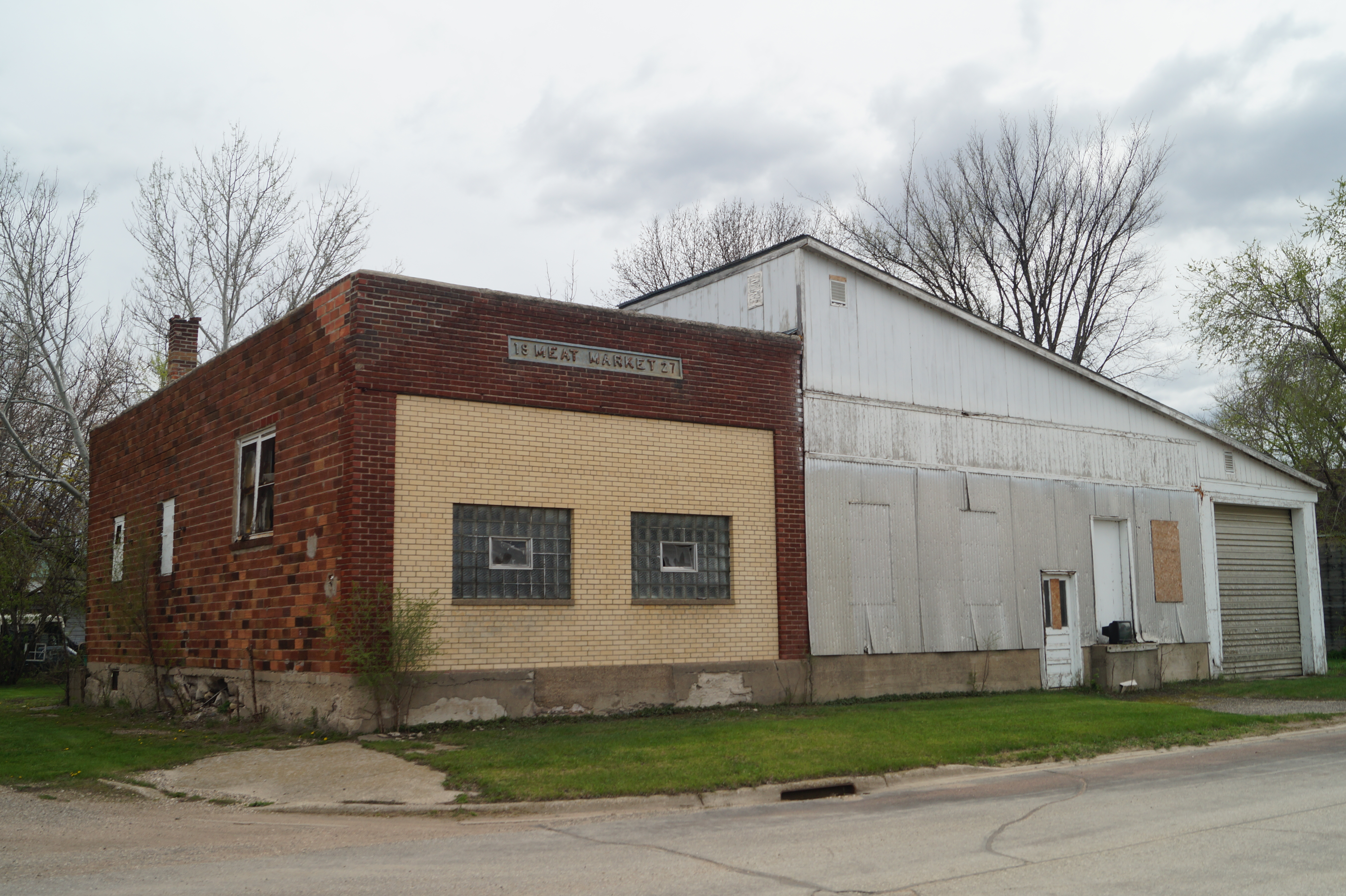
- Meat Market

- Location of Odessa, Minnesota
- Coordinates: 45°15′44″N 96°20′01″W
- Country: United States
- State: Minnesota
- County: Big Stone
- Settled: June 1870
- Platted: 1879

Government
  - Mayor: Catherine Teske

Area
  - Total: 0.965 sq mi (2.499 km^{2})
  - Land: 0.965 sq mi (2.499 km^{2})
  - Water: 0 sq mi (0.000 km^{2})
- Elevation: 955 ft (291 m)

Population (2020)
  - Total: 103
  - Estimate (2022): 104
  - Density: 106.7/sq mi (41.21/km^{2})
- Time zone: UTC−6 (Central (CST))
  - Summer (DST): UTC−5 (CDT)
- ZIP Code: 56276
- Area code: 320
- FIPS code: 27-48058
- GNIS feature ID: 2395298
- Sales tax: 6.875%

Odessa (/oʊˈdɛsə/ oh-DESS-ə) is a city in Big Stone County, Minnesota, United States. The population was 103 at the 2020 census.

== History ==
Odessa was platted in 1879 when the railroad was extended to that point. It was named after Odesa, Ukraine.

== Geography ==
According to the United States Census Bureau, the city has a total area of 2.499 square miles (6.47 km^{2}), all land.

U.S. Route 75 and Minnesota State Highway 7 (co-signed) serves as a main route in the community.

== Demographics ==
Historical population
Census	Pop.	Note	%±
1900	204		—
1910	235		15.2%
1920	271		15.3%
1930	284		4.8%
1940	316		11.3%
1950	283		−10.4%
1960	234		−17.3%
1970	194		−17.1%
1980	177		−8.8%
1990	155		−12.4%
2000	113		−27.1%
2010	135		19.5%
2020	103		−23.7%
2022 (est.)	104		1.0%
U.S. Decennial Census; 2020 Census

=== 2010 census ===
As of the census of 2010, there were 135 people, 58 households, and 39 families living in the city. The population density was 180.0 inhabitants per square mile (69.5/km^{2}). There were 68 housing units at an average density of 90.7 per square mile (35.0/km^{2}). The racial makeup of the city was 100.0% White. Hispanic or Latino of any race were 3.0% of the population.

There were 58 households, of which 20.7% had children under the age of 18 living with them, 56.9% were married couples living together, 5.2% had a female householder with no husband present, 5.2% had a male householder with no wife present, and 32.8% were non-families. 24.1% of all households were made up of individuals, and 10.3% had someone living alone who was 65 years of age or older. The average household size was 2.33 and the average family size was 2.79.

The median age in the city was 48.1 years. 18.5% of residents were under the age of 18; 3% were between the ages of 18 and 24; 25.1% were from 25 to 44; 31.1% were from 45 to 64; and 22.2% were 65 years of age or older. The gender makeup of the city was 54.8% male and 45.2% female.

=== 2000 census ===
As of the census of 2000, there were 113 people, 55 households, and 34 families living in the city. The population density was 149.4 inhabitants per square mile (57.7/km^{2}). There were 66 housing units at an average density of 87.3 per square mile (33.7/km^{2}). The racial makeup of the city was 100% White.

There were 55 households, out of which 14.5% had children under the age of 18 living with them, 54.5% were married couples living together, 5.5% had a female householder with no husband present, and 36.4% were non-families. 32.7% of all households were made up of individuals, and 16.4% had someone living alone who was 65 years of age or older. The average household size was 2.05 and the average family size was 2.57.

In the city, the population was spread out, with 12.4% under the age of 18, 6.2% from 18 to 24, 22.1% from 25 to 44, 32.7% from 45 to 64, and 26.5% who were 65 years of age or older. The median age was 50 years. For every 100 females, there were 101.8 males. For every 100 females age 18 and over, there were 98.0 males.

The median income for a household in the city was $23,125, and the median income for a family was $28,750. Males had a median income of $21,250 versus $25,625 for females. The per capita income for the city was $13,905. There were 11.4% of families and 11.0% of the population living below the poverty line, including 20.0% of under eighteens and 6.8% of those over 64.

== Education ==
It is in the Ortonville School District.
