= Artichoke Lake =

Lake in the state of Minnesota, United States

- Location within Minnesota
- Location: Big Stone and Swift counties, Minnesota
- Coordinates: 45°21′45″N 96°8′21″W
- Type: lake

Artichoke Lake is a lake in Big Stone and Swift counties, Minnesota, in the United States.

Artichoke Lake is likely a translation of P̣aƞġí Ok’á Bde, the traditional name of the lake in the Dakota language. This name refers to the Jerusalem artichokes harvested there for food.

== See also ==
- List of lakes in Minnesota
