= Foster, Minnesota =

Unincorporated community in Minnesota, US

Foster
- Unincorporated community
- Location within Minnesota Location within the United States
- Coordinates: 45°24′59″N 96°40′33″W
- Country: United States
- State: Minnesota
- County: Big Stone
- Elevation: 997 ft (304 m)
- Time zone: UTC-6 (Central (CST))
  - Summer (DST): UTC-5 (CDT)
- Area code: 320
- GNIS feature ID: 643834

Foster is an unincorporated community in Foster Township, Big Stone, Minnesota, United States.

== History ==
Foster was platted in 1880. It was named for Foster L. Balch.
