= Correll, Minnesota =

City in Minnesota, United States

- City
- Location of Correll, Minnesota
- Coordinates: 45°13′55″N 96°09′43″W
- Country: United States
- State: Minnesota
- County: Big Stone
- Platted: 1879

Government
  - Mayor: Diane Koepp

Area
  - Total: 0.382 sq mi (0.989 km^{2})
  - Land: 0.382 sq mi (0.989 km^{2})
  - Water: 0 sq mi (0.000 km^{2})
- Elevation: 981 ft (299 m)

Population (2020)
  - Total: 26
  - Estimate (2022): 28
  - Density: 68.1/sq mi (26.29/km^{2})
- Time zone: UTC−6 (Central (CST))
  - Summer (DST): UTC−5 (CDT)
- ZIP Code: 56227
- Area code: 320
- FIPS code: 27-13384
- GNIS feature ID: 2393639
- Sales tax: 6.875%

Correll is a city in Big Stone County, Minnesota, United States. The population was 26 at the 2020 census. Correll was named for David N Correll, a railroad official who founded the city in 1881.

== Geography ==
According to the United States Census Bureau, the city has a total area of 0.36 square miles (0.93 km^{2}), all land.

Minnesota State Highway 7 and County Highway 25 are two of the main routes in the community.

== Demographics ==
Historical population
Census	Pop.	Note	%±
1910	102		—
1920	176		72.5%
1930	143		−18.7%
1940	151		5.6%
1950	130		−13.9%
1960	101		−22.3%
1970	95		−5.9%
1980	83		−12.6%
1990	60		−27.7%
2000	47		−21.7%
2010	34		−27.7%
2020	26		−23.5%
2022 (est.)	28		7.7%
U.S. Decennial Census; 2020 Census

=== 2010 census ===
As of the 2010 census, there were 34 people, 18 households, and 10 families living in the city. The population density was 94.4 inhabitants per square mile (36.4/km^{2}). There were 27 housing units at an average density of 75.0 per square mile (29.0/km^{2}). The racial makeup of the city was 94.1% White, 2.9% African American, and 2.9% Native American. Hispanic or Latino of any race were 2.9% of the population.

There were 18 households, of which 16.7% had children under the age of 18 living with them, 33.3% were married couples living together, 16.7% had a female householder with no husband present, 5.6% had a male householder with no wife present, and 44.4% were non-families. 27.8% of all households were made up of individuals, and 11.1% had someone living alone who was 65 years of age or older. The average household size was 1.89 and the average family size was 2.10.

The median age in the city was 48.5 years. 8.8% of residents were under the age of 18; 5.8% were between the ages of 18 and 24; 26.3% were from 25 to 44; 32.4% were from 45 to 64; and 26.5% were 65 years of age or older. The gender makeup of the city was 52.9% male and 47.1% female.

=== 2000 census ===
As of the 2000 census, there were 47 people, 23 households, and 14 families living in the city. The population density was 128.2 inhabitants per square mile (49.5/km^{2}). There were 30 housing units at an average density of 81.8 per square mile (31.6/km^{2}). The racial makeup of the city was 100.00% White.

There were 23 households, out of which 21.7% had children under the age of 18 living with them, 56.5% were married couples living together, 8.7% had a female householder with no husband present, and 34.8% were non-families. 30.4% of all households were made up of individuals, and 8.7% had someone living alone who was 65 years of age or older. The average household size was 2.04 and the average family size was 2.47.

In the city, the population was spread out, with 17.0% under the age of 18, 4.3% from 18 to 24, 31.9% from 25 to 44, 27.7% from 45 to 64, and 19.1% who were 65 years of age or older. The median age was 43 years. For every 100 females, there were 147.4 males. For every 100 females age 18 and over, there were 116.7 males.

The median income for a household in the city was $19,375, and the median income for a family was $23,250. Males had a median income of $27,500 versus $11,250 for females. The per capita income for the city was $12,920. There were 15.8% of families and 15.7% of the population living below the poverty line, including no under eighteens and 50.0% of those over 64.
