= Artichoke Creek (Minnesota) =

River in the United States of America

Coordinates: 45°24′4.83″N 96°6′8.63″W

Artichoke Creek is a stream in Swift County, in the U.S. state of Minnesota.

Artichoke Creek was named for the Jerusalem artichokes harvested by Ojibwe Indians as a food source.

== See also ==
- List of rivers of Minnesota
