= Artichoke, Minnesota =

Unincorporated community in Minnesota, US

Artichoke
- Unincorporated community
- Location within Minnesota Location within the United States
- Coordinates: 45°23′57″N 96°09′27″W
- Country: United States
- State: Minnesota
- County: Big Stone
- Elevation: 1,093 ft (333 m)
- Time zone: UTC-6 (Central (CST))
  - Summer (DST): UTC-5 (CDT)
- Area code: 320
- GNIS feature ID: 654575

Artichoke is an unincorporated community in Artichoke Township, Big Stone County, Minnesota, United States.

Artichoke is located at the intersection between 600th ave and Big stone county Rd 8.
