= Blomkest, Minnesota =

City in Minnesota, United States

Blomkest
- City
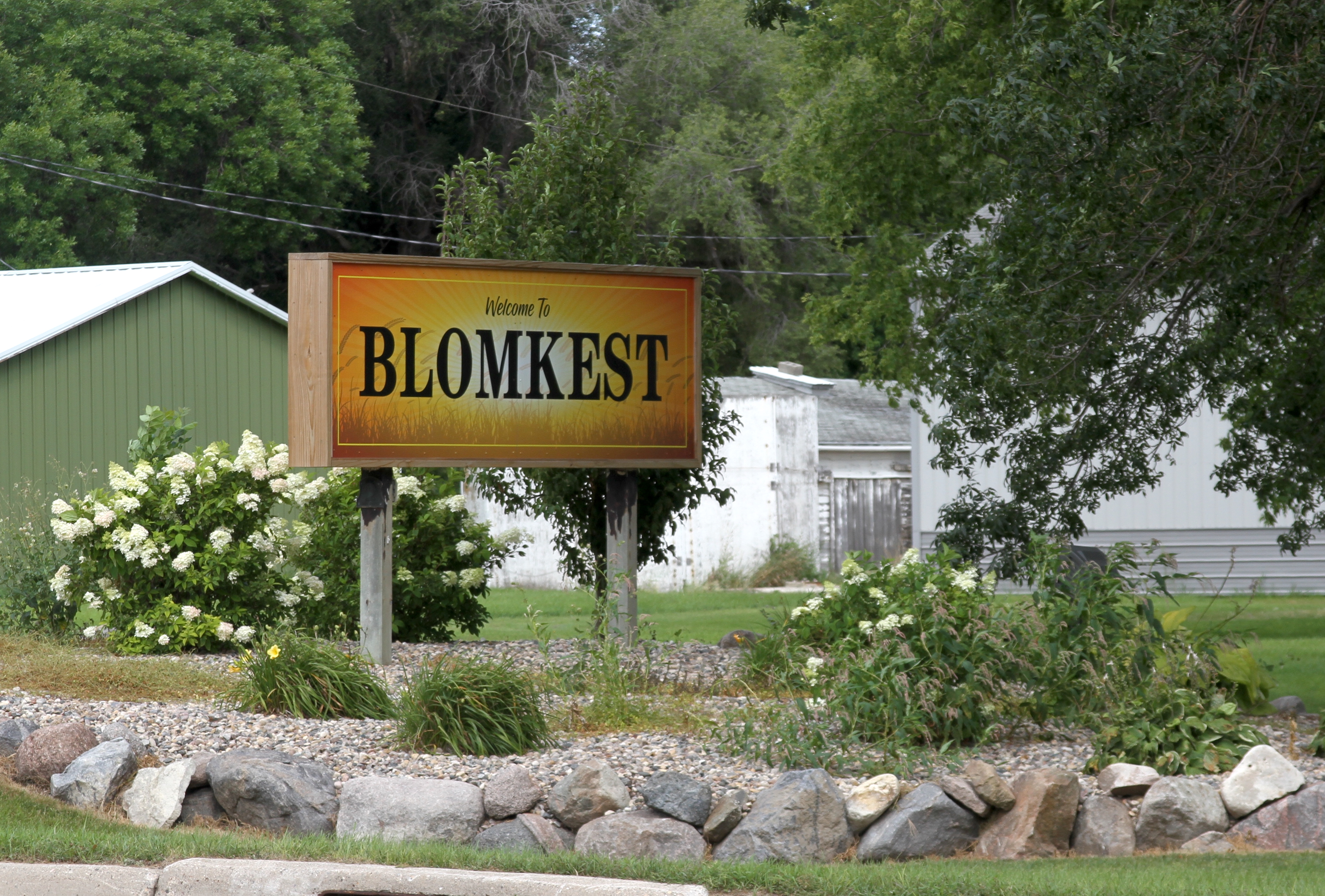

- Location of Blomkest, Minnesota
- Coordinates: 44°56′34″N 95°01′24″W
- Country: United States
- State: Minnesota
- County: Kandiyohi

Area
  - Total: 1.02 sq mi (2.64 km^{2})
  - Land: 1.02 sq mi (2.64 km^{2})
  - Water: 0 sq mi (0.00 km^{2})
- Elevation: 1,135 ft (346 m)

Population (2020)
  - Total: 145
  - Density: 142.5/sq mi (55.01/km^{2})
- Time zone: UTC-6 (Central (CST))
  - Summer (DST): UTC-5 (CDT)
- ZIP code: 56216
- Area code: 320
- FIPS code: 27-06490
- GNIS feature ID: 2394193

Blomkest (/ˈblʌmkɛst/ BLUM-kest) is a city in Kandiyohi County, Minnesota, United States. The population was 145 at the 2020 census.

== Demographics ==
Historical population
Census	Pop.	Note	%±
1960	171		—
1970	172		0.6%
1980	200		16.3%
1990	183		−8.5%
2000	186		1.6%
2010	157		−15.6%
2020	145		−7.6%
U.S. Decennial Census

=== 2010 census ===
As of the census of 2010, there were 157 people, 68 households, and 53 families living in the city. The population density was 152.4 inhabitants per square mile (58.8/km^{2}). There were 72 housing units at an average density of 69.9 per square mile (27.0/km^{2}). The racial makeup of the city was 95.5% White, 0.6% Asian, 0.6% from other races, and 3.2% from two or more races. Hispanic or Latino of any race were 6.4% of the population.

There were 68 households, of which 25.0% had children under the age of 18 living with them, 73.5% were married couples living together, 1.5% had a female householder with no husband present, 2.9% had a male householder with no wife present, and 22.1% were non-families. 17.6% of all households were made up of individuals, and 10.3% had someone living alone who was 65 years of age or older. The average household size was 2.31 and the average family size was 2.60.

The median age in the city was 49.9 years. 17.2% of residents were under the age of 18; 3.7% were between the ages of 18 and 24; 17.3% were from 25 to 44; 40.1% were from 45 to 64; and 21.7% were 65 years of age or older. The gender makeup of the city was 53.5% male and 46.5% female.

=== 2000 census ===
As of the census of 2000, there were 186 people, 66 households, and 53 families living in the city. The population density was 179.8 inhabitants per square mile (69.4/km^{2}). There were 70 housing units at an average density of 67.7 per square mile (26.1/km^{2}). The racial makeup of the city was 96.77% White, 3.23% from other races. Hispanic or Latino of any race were 4.84% of the population.

There were 66 households, out of which 43.9% had children under the age of 18 living with them, 71.2% were married couples living together, 7.6% had a female householder with no husband present, and 18.2% were non-families. 18.2% of all households were made up of individuals, and 7.6% had someone living alone who was 65 years of age or older. The average household size was 2.82 and the average family size was 3.20.

In the city, the population was spread out, with 31.7% under the age of 18, 5.4% from 18 to 24, 32.3% from 25 to 44, 18.8% from 45 to 64, and 11.8% who were 65 years of age or older. The median age was 36 years. For every 100 females, there were 93.8 males. For every 100 females age 18 and over, there were 98.4 males.

The median income for a household in the city was $34,583, and the median income for a family was $40,833. Males had a median income of $27,500 versus $26,000 for females. The per capita income for the city was $16,072. About 3.7% of families and 4.0% of the population were below the poverty line, including 2.0% of those under the age of eighteen and none of those 65 or over.
