= Big Stone County, Minnesota =

County in Minnesota, United States

- County
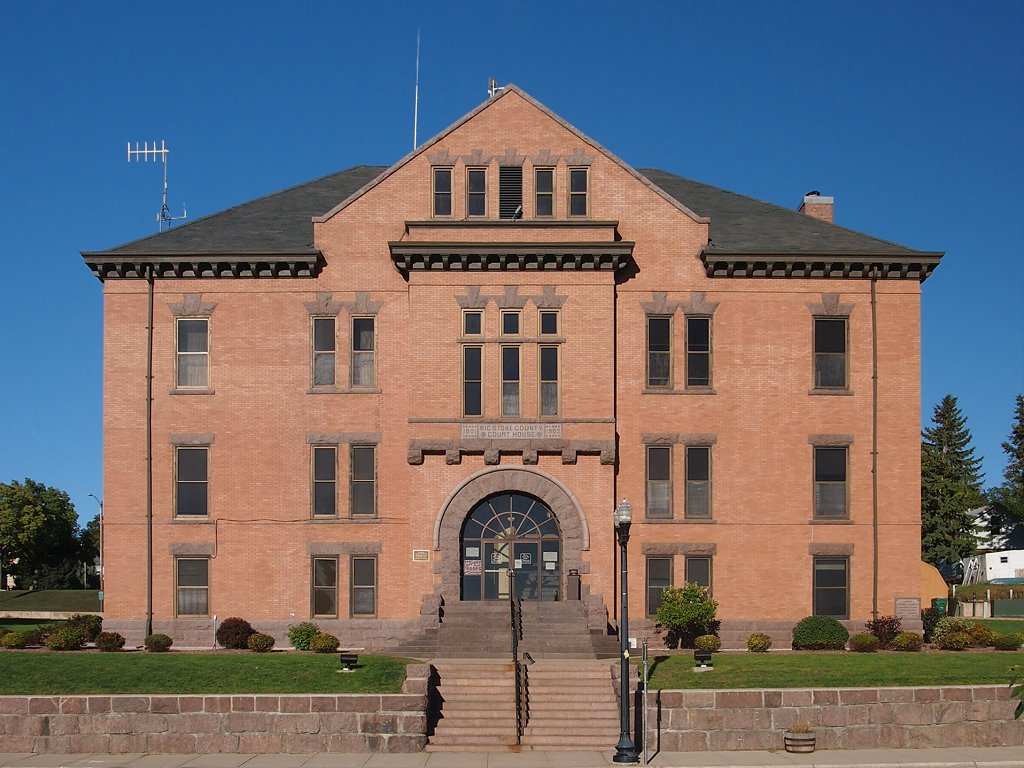
- Big Stone County Courthouse in Ortonville, Minnesota.

- Location within the U.S. state of Minnesota
- Coordinates: 45°26′N 96°25′W
- Country: United States
- State: Minnesota
- Founded: February 20, 1862 (created); 1874 (organized)
- Named for: Big Stone Lake
- Seat: Ortonville
- Largest city: Ortonville

Area
  - Total: 528 sq mi (1,370 km^{2})
  - Land: 499 sq mi (1,290 km^{2})
  - Water: 29 sq mi (75 km^{2}) 5.5%

Population (2020)
  - Total: 5,166
  - Estimate (2025): 5,054 ▼
  - Density: 10.1/sq mi (3.9/km^{2})
- Time zone: UTC−6 (Central)
  - Summer (DST): UTC−5 (CDT)
- Congressional district: 7th
- Website: bigstonecounty.gov

Big Stone County is a county in the U.S. state of Minnesota. As of the 2020 census, the population was 5,166. Its county seat is Ortonville.

== History ==
The county was formed in 1862, and was organized in 1874. It is named for Big Stone Lake.

== Geography ==
Big Stone County lies on the western side of Minnesota. Its southwest boundary line abuts the east boundary line of the state of South Dakota. The Little Minnesota River flows along the county's southwestern boundary. Since 1937, a dam (Big Stone Lake Dam) has impounded the river's waters, increasing the size of Big Stone Lake. Water flowing out from this lake flows along the south boundary line of the county, and is known as the Minnesota River from that point. Fish Creek flows southwesterly through the northwestern part of the county, discharging into Big Stone Lake at the county's southwestern boundary.

The terrain of Big Stone County is low rolling hills, wooded or devoted to agriculture. The terrain generally slopes to the south and east, although its southwestern portion slopes to the river valley. Its highest point is on its north line near the northwestern corner, 2.9 miles (4.7 km) east of Lagoona Beach, at 1,201 ft (366 m) ASL. The county has a total area of 528 square miles (1,370 km^{2}), of which 499 square miles (1,290 km^{2}) is land and 29 square miles (75 km^{2}) (5.5%) is water.

Soils of Big Stone County

=== Lakes ===
- Artichoke Lake - south edge in Akron Township, vast majority in Artichoke Township
- Barry Lake - Toqua Township
- Bentsen Lake - east half in Otrey Township, west half in Big Stone Township
- Big Stone Lake - Ortonville Township, Browns Valley Township, Foster Township, Prior Township, Big Stone Township
- Clear Lake - Toqua Township
- Cup Lake - Almond Township
- Deep Lake - Big Stone Township
- East Toqua Lake - Graceville Township
- Eli Lake - south three-quarters in Almond Township, west quarter in Clinton
- Fogarty Lake - Toqua Township
- Horseshoe Lake - Odessa Township
- Lannon Lake - Graceville Township
- Lindgren Lake - Ortonville Township
- Lake Leo - Graceville Township
- Lone Tree Lake - east three-quarters in Malta Township, west quarter in Almond Township
- Long Lake - Artichoke Township
- Long Tom Lake - northeast edge in Otrey Township, vast majority in Odessa Township
- Lysing Lake - vast majority in Almond Township, south edge in Big Stone Township
- Marsh Lake - Akron Township
- Moonshine Lake - Moonshine Township
- Moulton Lake - Big Stone Township
- Mundweiler Lake - Big Stone Township
- Munnwyler Lake - Ortonville Township
- Olson Lake - Big Stone Township
- Olson Lake - Otrey Township
- Otrey Lake - Otrey Township
- Peterson Lake - Odessa Township
- South Rothwell Lake - north edge in Graceville Township, vast majority in Almond Township
- Smithwicks Lake - Graceville Township
- Swenson Lake - Big Stone Township
- Twin Lakes - Big Stone Township
- West Toqua Lake - Graceville Township
- Walter Lake - Ortonville Township

Source: United States Census Bureau 2007 TIGER/Line Shapefiles

=== Major highways ===
- U.S. Highway 12
- U.S. Highway 75
- Minnesota State Highway 7
- Minnesota State Highway 28

=== Adjacent counties ===
- Traverse County - north
- Stevens County - northeast
- Swift County - southeast
- Lac qui Parle County - south
- Grant County, South Dakota - southwest
- Roberts County, South Dakota - northwest

=== Protected areas ===
- Big Stone Lake State Park
- Big Stone National Wildlife Refuge (part)
- Big Stone Wildlife Management Preserve (part)
- Bonanza Prairie Scientific and Natural Area
- Clinton Prairie Scientific and Natural Area
- Dismal Swamp State Wildlife Management Area
- Freed State Wildlife Management Area
- Lac qui Parle State Wildlife Management Area
- Otrey State Wildlife Management Area
- Reisdorph State Wildlife Management Area
- Victor State Wildlife Management Area

== Climate and weather ==
Ortonville, Minnesota

Climate chart (precipitation, max. and min. temperature)
J	F	M	A	M	J	J	A	S	O	N	D
0.6 23 1	0.6 27 7	1.4 39 19	2.6 56 32	2.5 69 45	3.6 78 56	3.9 84 60	2.7 82 58	2.6 73 47	2.2 59 34	1 41 21	0.4 25 7
- █ Average max. and min. temperatures in °F
- █ Precipitation totals in inches
- Source: The Weather Channel
Metric conversion
J	F	M	A	M	J	J	A	S	O	N	D
15 −5 −17	14 −3 −14	35 4 −7	67 13 0	64 21 7	90 26 13	98 29 16	69 28 14	66 23 8	57 15 1	25 5 −6	11 −4 −14
- █ Average max. and min. temperatures in °C
- █ Precipitation totals in mm

In recent years, average temperatures in the county seat of Ortonville have ranged from a low of 1 °F (−17 °C) in January to a high of 84 °F (29 °C) in July, although a record low of −44 °F (−42 °C) was recorded in February 1994 and a record high of 108 °F (42 °C) was recorded in July 1966. Average monthly precipitation ranged from 0.43 inches (11 mm) in December to 3.85 inches (98 mm) in July.

== Demographics ==
Historical population
Census	Pop.	Note	%±
1870	24		—
1880	3,688		15,266.7%
1890	5,722		55.2%
1900	8,731		52.6%
1910	9,367		7.3%
1920	9,766		4.3%
1930	9,838		0.7%
1940	10,447		6.2%
1950	9,607		−8.0%
1960	8,954		−6.8%
1970	7,941		−11.3%
1980	7,716		−2.8%
1990	6,285		−18.5%
2000	5,820		−7.4%
2010	5,269		−9.5%
2020	5,166		−2.0%
2025 (est.)	5,054	▼	−2.2%
U.S. Decennial Census:

=== Racial and ethnic composition ===
Big Stone County, Minnesota – Racial and ethnic composition Note: the US Census treats Hispanic/Latino as an ethnic category. This table excludes Latinos from the racial categories and assigns them to a separate category. Hispanics/Latinos may be of any race.
Race / Ethnicity (NH = Non-Hispanic)	Pop 1980	Pop 1990	Pop 2000	Pop 2010	Pop 2020	% 1980	% 1990	% 2000	% 2010	% 2020
White alone (NH)	7,637	6,217	5,719	5,150	4,809	98.98%	98.92%	98.26%	97.74%	93.09%
Black or African American alone (NH)	0	4	10	10	19	0.00%	0.06%	0.17%	0.19%	0.37%
Native American or Alaska Native alone (NH)	17	25	28	22	34	0.22%	0.40%	0.48%	0.42%	0.66%
Asian alone (NH)	29	15	24	4	12	0.38%	0.24%	0.41%	0.08%	0.23%
Native Hawaiian or Pacific Islander alone (NH)	x	x	0	0	4	x	x	0.00%	0.00%	0.08%
Other race alone (NH)	5	1	2	5	34	0.06%	0.02%	0.03%	0.09%	0.66%
Mixed race or Multiracial (NH)	x	x	17	37	114	x	x	0.29%	0.70%	2.21%
Hispanic or Latino (any race)	28	23	20	41	140	0.36%	0.37%	0.34%	0.78%	2.71%
Total	7,716	6,285	5,820	5,269	5,166	100.00%	100.00%	100.00%	100.00%	100.00%

=== 2020 census ===
As of the 2020 census, the county had a population of 5,166. The median age was 48.3 years. 21.1% of residents were under the age of 18 and 27.0% of residents were 65 years of age or older. For every 100 females there were 97.0 males, and for every 100 females age 18 and over there were 94.0 males age 18 and over.

The racial makeup of the county was 93.5% White, 0.6% Black or African American, 0.9% American Indian and Alaska Native, 0.3% Asian, 0.1% Native Hawaiian and Pacific Islander, 1.5% from some other race, and 3.1% from two or more races. Hispanic or Latino residents of any race comprised 2.7% of the population.

<0.1% of residents lived in urban areas, while 100.0% lived in rural areas.

There were 2,224 households in the county, of which 23.7% had children under the age of 18 living in them. Of all households, 52.2% were married-couple households, 19.3% were households with a male householder and no spouse or partner present, and 22.8% were households with a female householder and no spouse or partner present. About 32.2% of all households were made up of individuals and 17.2% had someone living alone who was 65 years of age or older.

There were 2,982 housing units, of which 25.4% were vacant. Among occupied housing units, 77.3% were owner-occupied and 22.7% were renter-occupied. The homeowner vacancy rate was 2.9% and the rental vacancy rate was 13.9%.

=== 2000 census ===
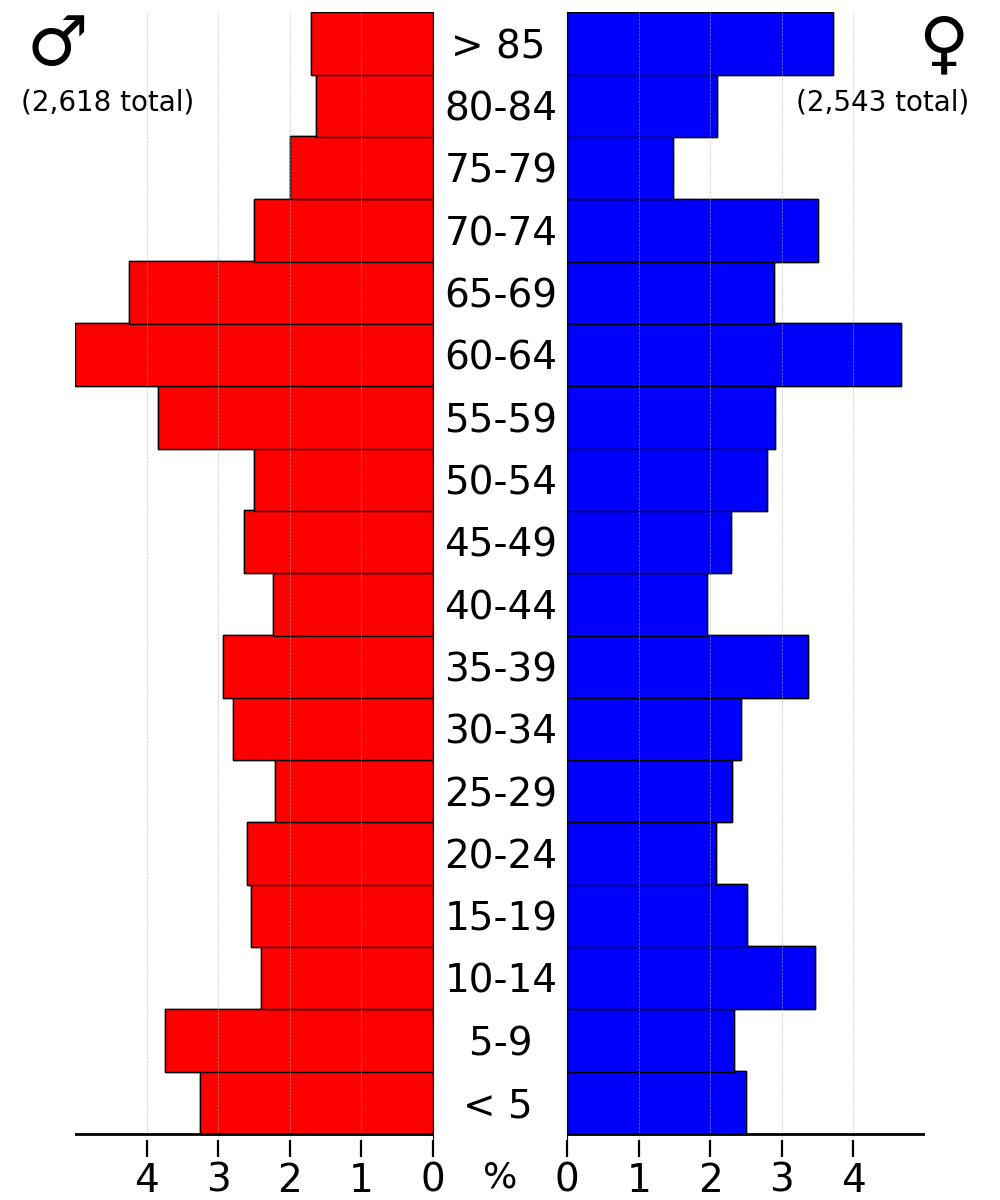
2022 US Census population pyramid for Becker County, from ACS 5-year estimates

As of the census of 2000, there were 5,820 people, 2,377 households, and 1,611 families in the county. The population density was 11.7 per square mile (4.5/km^{2}). There were 3,171 housing units at an average density of 6.35 per square mile (2.45/km^{2}). The racial makeup of the county was 98.44% White, 0.17% Black or African American, 0.52% Native American, 0.41% Asian, 0.12% from other races, and 0.34% from two or more races. 0.34% of the population were Hispanic or Latino of any race. 45.7% were of German, 21.0% Norwegian, 8.0% Swedish and 6.3% Irish ancestry.

There were 2,377 households, out of which 29.00% had children under the age of 18 living with them, 59.60% were married couples living together, 5.30% had a female householder with no husband present, and 32.20% were non-families. 30.20% of all households were made up of individuals, and 16.90% had someone living alone who was 65 years of age or older. The average household size was 2.38 and the average family size was 2.97.

The county population contained 24.80% under the age of 18, 5.30% from 18 to 24, 21.90% from 25 to 44, 24.00% from 45 to 64, and 24.00% who were 65 years of age or older. The median age was 44 years. For every 100 females there were 94.30 males. For every 100 females age 18 and over, there were 91.10 males.

The median income for a household in the county was $30,721, and the median income for a family was $37,354. Males had a median income of $27,857 versus $20,123 for females. The per capita income for the county was $15,708. About 7.80% of families and 12.00% of the population were below the poverty line, including 14.50% of those under age 18 and 8.80% of those age 65 or over.

== Communities ==
=== Cities ===
- Barry
- Beardsley
- Clinton
- Correll
- Graceville
- Johnson
- Odessa
- Ortonville

=== Unincorporated communities ===
- Artichoke
- Big Stone Colony
- Bonanza Grove
- Foster
- Lagoona Beach
- Yankeetown

=== Townships ===
- Akron Township
- Almond Township
- Artichoke Township
- Big Stone Township
- Browns Valley Township
- Foster Township
- Graceville Township
- Malta Township
- Moonshine Township
- Odessa Township
- Ortonville Township
- Otrey Township
- Prior Township
- Toqua Township

== Government and politics ==
Between 1928 and 2008, Big Stone County voted Democratic in every election except for two nationwide Republican landslides in 1952 and 1980. The only other time between 1928 and 2000 that the Republican candidate lost by less than 10% was Ronald Reagan during his 1984 landslide reelection. Beginning in 2000, the Democratic margins began to shrink, with George W. Bush losing by about 2% in both 2000 and 2004, and by a margin of no more than 60 votes. Despite favoring Barack Obama by over 6% in 2008, this would prove to be the most recent time Big Stone County would vote Democratic. Mitt Romney narrowly carried the county by 40 votes and less than 1.5% in 2012. But in 2016, Donald Trump greatly expanded the thin margin Romney won the county by as Democratic candidate Hillary Clinton lost by nearly 25%, the first time a Republican won by more than 5% in the county since 1924. Trump further increased his margin of victory in 2020 to over 27%, and improved even more in 2024 to over a 29% margin of victory.

United States presidential election results for Big Stone County, Minnesota
Year	Republican		Democratic		Third party(ies)	
Year	No.	%	No.	%	No.	%
1892	576	41.68%	498	36.03%	308	22.29%
1896	1,048	55.72%	742	39.45%	91	4.84%
1900	1,081	59.27%	644	35.31%	99	5.43%
1904	1,234	73.10%	318	18.84%	136	8.06%
1908	965	57.78%	565	33.83%	140	8.38%
1912	244	14.56%	677	40.39%	755	45.05%
1916	810	44.88%	869	48.14%	126	6.98%
1920	2,415	78.16%	451	14.60%	224	7.25%
1924	1,524	46.14%	260	7.87%	1,519	45.99%
1928	1,641	43.20%	2,133	56.15%	25	0.66%
1932	868	20.99%	3,200	77.37%	68	1.64%
1936	1,116	27.91%	2,648	66.22%	235	5.88%
1940	1,925	42.95%	2,517	56.16%	40	0.89%
1944	1,608	42.86%	2,120	56.50%	24	0.64%
1948	1,321	33.99%	2,466	63.46%	99	2.55%
1952	2,260	51.46%	2,107	47.97%	25	0.57%
1956	1,737	44.25%	2,180	55.54%	8	0.20%
1960	1,834	42.83%	2,437	56.91%	11	0.26%
1964	1,331	31.90%	2,831	67.86%	10	0.24%
1968	1,645	41.69%	2,119	53.70%	182	4.61%
1972	1,748	43.52%	2,185	54.39%	84	2.09%
1976	1,332	33.24%	2,581	64.41%	94	2.35%
1980	1,950	47.67%	1,814	44.34%	327	7.99%
1984	1,821	47.34%	1,994	51.83%	32	0.83%
1988	1,469	41.66%	2,026	57.46%	31	0.88%
1992	1,052	30.76%	1,610	47.08%	758	22.16%
1996	990	32.99%	1,619	53.95%	392	13.06%
2000	1,370	45.97%	1,430	47.99%	180	6.04%
2004	1,483	48.35%	1,536	50.08%	48	1.57%
2008	1,362	45.55%	1,552	51.91%	76	2.54%
2012	1,385	49.66%	1,345	48.23%	59	2.12%
2016	1,608	58.37%	921	33.43%	226	8.20%
2020	1,863	62.64%	1,053	35.41%	58	1.95%
2024	1,796	63.60%	964	34.14%	64	2.27%

County Board of Commissioners
Position	Name	District
Commissioner	Chad Zimmel	District 1
Commissioner	Wade Athey	District 2
Commissioner and Chairperson	Brent Olson	District 3
Commissioner	Roger Sandberg	District 4
Commissioner	Jeff Klages	District 5

State Legislature (2018–2020)
Position	Name	Affiliation	District
Senate	Torrey Westrom	Republican	District 12
House of Representatives	Jeff Backer	Republican	District 12A

U.S Congress (2021–2023)
Position	Name	Affiliation	District
House of Representatives	Michelle Fischbach	Republican	7th
Senate	Amy Klobuchar	Democrat	N/A
Senate	Tina Smith	Democrat	N/A

== Education ==
School districts include:

- Chokio-Alberta Public School District
- Clinton-Graceville-Beardsley School District
- Lac qui Parle Valley School District
- Ortonville Public Schools

== See also ==
- National Register of Historic Places listings in Big Stone County, Minnesota
- List of Minnesota placenames of Native American origin
