= Baker Township, Stevens County, Minnesota =

Baker Township, Minnesota
- Township
- Location within the state of Minnesota Baker Township, Minnesota (the United States)
- Coordinates: 45°32′29″N 96°10′26″W
- Country: United States
- State: Minnesota
- County: Stevens

Area
  - Total: 35.6 sq mi (92.2 km^{2})
  - Land: 35.4 sq mi (91.7 km^{2})
  - Water: 0.15 sq mi (0.4 km^{2})
- Elevation: 1,122 ft (342 m)

Population (2000)
  - Total: 265
  - Density: 7.5/sq mi (2.9/km^{2})
- Time zone: UTC-6 (Central (CST))
  - Summer (DST): UTC-5 (CDT)
- FIPS code: 27-03232
- GNIS feature ID: 0663494

Baker Township is a township in Stevens County, Minnesota, United States. The population was 103 at the 2020 census.

== History ==
Baker Township originally had the name Potsdam Township.

== Geography ==
According to the United States Census Bureau, the township has a total area of 35.6 square miles (92 km^{2}), of which 35.4 square miles (92 km^{2}) is land and 0.2 square miles (0.52 km^{2}) (0.45%) is water.

== Demographics ==
As of the census of 2000, there were 265 people, 61 households, and 43 families residing in the township. The population density was 7.5 people per square mile (2.9 people/km^{2}). There were 68 housing units at an average density of 1.9 per square mile (0.73/km^{2}). The racial makeup of the township was 99.62% White and 0.38% Asian.

There were 61 households, out of which 29.5% had children under the age of 18 living with them, 67.2% were married couples living together, 1.6% had a female householder with no husband present, and 29.5% were non-families. 26.2% of all households were made up of individuals, and 18.0% had someone living alone who was 65 years of age or older. The average household size was 2.62 and the average family size was 3.26.

In the township the population was spread out, with 17.0% under the age of 18, 4.9% from 18 to 24, 13.6% from 25 to 44, 14.3% from 45 to 64, and 50.2% who were 65 years of age or older. The median age was 66 years. For every 100 females, there were 68.8 males. For every 100 females age 18 and over, there were 66.7 males.

The median income for a household in the township was $23,125, and the median income for a family was $31,875. Males had a median income of $35,833 versus $26,250 for females. The per capita income for the township was $14,426. About 24.2% of families and 24.8% of the population were below the poverty line, including 12.9% of those under the age of eighteen and 30.6% of those 65 or over.
