= Folsom Township, Traverse County, Minnesota =

Township in Minnesota, United States

Folsom Township, Minnesota
- Township
- Location within the state of Minnesota Folsom Township, Minnesota (the United States)
- Coordinates: 45°37′20″N 96°48′48″W
- Country: United States
- State: Minnesota
- County: Traverse

Area
  - Total: 21.7 sq mi (56.2 km^{2})
  - Land: 19.9 sq mi (51.5 km^{2})
  - Water: 1.8 sq mi (4.7 km^{2})
- Elevation: 1,152 ft (351 m)

Population (2000)
  - Total: 149
  - Density: 7.5/sq mi (2.9/km^{2})
- Time zone: UTC-6 (Central (CST))
  - Summer (DST): UTC-5 (CDT)
- FIPS code: 27-21554
- GNIS feature ID: 0664187

Folsom Township is a township in Traverse County, Minnesota, United States. The population was 149 at the 2000 census.

Folsom Township was organized in 1880, and named for George P. Folsom, a pioneer merchant.

== Geography ==
According to the United States Census Bureau, the township has a total area of 21.7 square miles (56 km^{2}), of which 19.9 square miles (52 km^{2}) is land and 1.8 square miles (4.7 km^{2}) (8.39%) is water.

== Demographics ==
As of the census of 2000, there were 149 people, 59 households, and 45 families residing in the township. The population density was 7.5 inhabitants per square mile (2.9/km^{2}). There were 135 housing units at an average density of 6.8 per square mile (2.6/km^{2}). The racial makeup of the township was 99.33% White and 0.67% Native American.

There were 59 households, out of which 27.1% had children under the age of 18 living with them, 74.6% were married couples living together, and 23.7% were non-families. 23.7% of all households were made up of individuals, and 10.2% had someone living alone who was 65 years of age or older. The average household size was 2.53 and the average family size was 2.96.

In the township the population was spread out, with 26.8% under the age of 18, 2.7% from 18 to 24, 20.8% from 25 to 44, 25.5% from 45 to 64, and 24.2% who were 65 years of age or older. The median age was 44 years. For every 100 females, there were 129.2 males. For every 100 females age 18 and over, there were 109.6 males.

The median income for a household in the township was $22,321, and the median income for a family was $32,500. Males had a median income of $27,500 versus $18,750 for females. The per capita income for the township was $11,613. There were 15.2% of families and 23.8% of the population living below the poverty line, including 32.7% of under eighteens and none of those over 64.
