= Hegbert Township, Swift County, Minnesota =

Hegbert Township, Minnesota
- Township
- Location within the state of Minnesota Hegbert Township, Minnesota (the United States)
- Coordinates: 45°21′52″N 96°3′59″W
- Country: United States
- State: Minnesota
- County: Swift

Area
  - Total: 35.6 sq mi (92.2 km^{2})
  - Land: 33.3 sq mi (86.3 km^{2})
  - Water: 2.3 sq mi (5.9 km^{2})
- Elevation: 1,089 ft (332 m)

Population (2000)
  - Total: 118
  - Density: 3.6/sq mi (1.4/km^{2})
- Time zone: UTC-6 (Central (CST))
  - Summer (DST): UTC-5 (CDT)
- FIPS code: 27-28160
- GNIS feature ID: 0664436

Hegbert Township is a township in Swift County, Minnesota, United States. The population was 118 at the 2000 census.

Hegbert Township was organized in 1876 by Ole Hegstad and others.

== Geography ==
According to the United States Census Bureau, the township has a total area of 35.6 square miles (92 km^{2}), of which 33.3 square miles (86 km^{2}) is land and 2.3 square miles (6.0 km^{2}) is water. The total area is 6.43% water.

== Demographics ==
As of the census of 2000, there were 118 people, 45 households, and 36 families residing in the township. The population density was 3.5 inhabitants per square mile (1.4/km^{2}). There were 56 housing units at an average density of 1.7 per square mile (0.66/km^{2}). The racial makeup of the township was 100.00% White. Hispanic or Latino of any race were 2.54% of the population.

There were 45 households, out of which 26.7% had children under the age of 18 living with them, 73.3% were married couples living together, 6.7% had a female householder with no husband present, and 17.8% were non-families. 13.3% of all households were made up of individuals, and 8.9% had someone living alone who was 65 years of age or older. The average household size was 2.62 and the average family size was 2.86.

In the township the population was spread out, with 24.6% under the age of 18, 0.8% from 18 to 24, 28.8% from 25 to 44, 30.5% from 45 to 64, and 15.3% who were 65 years of age or older. The median age was 44 years. For every 100 females, there were 122.6 males. For every 100 females age 18 and over, there were 111.9 males.

The median income for a household in the township was $36,250, and the median income for a family was $34,688. Males had a median income of $20,417 versus $14,375 for females. The per capita income for the township was $14,562. There were 17.1% of families and 30.6% of the population living below the poverty line, including 60.0% of under eighteens and 18.2% of those over 64.
