= Lake Shore Township, Lac qui Parle County, Minnesota =

Lake Shore Township, Minnesota
- Township
- Location within the state of Minnesota Lake Shore Township, Minnesota (the United States)
- Coordinates: 45°8′25″N 96°9′56″W
- Country: United States
- State: Minnesota
- County: Lac qui Parle

Area
  - Total: 53.9 sq mi (139.6 km^{2})
  - Land: 51.7 sq mi (133.8 km^{2})
  - Water: 2.2 sq mi (5.8 km^{2})
- Elevation: 1,040 ft (317 m)

Population (2000)
  - Total: 239
  - Density: 4.7/sq mi (1.8/km^{2})
- Time zone: UTC-6 (Central (CST))
  - Summer (DST): UTC-5 (CDT)
- FIPS code: 27-34946
- GNIS feature ID: 0664700

Lake Shore Township is a township in Lac qui Parle County, Minnesota, United States. The population was 239 at the 2000 census.

Lake Shore Township was organized in 1879, and named for its location near a marshy lake.

== Geography ==
According to the United States Census Bureau, the township has a total area of 53.9 square miles (140 km^{2}), of which 51.7 square miles (134 km^{2}) is land and 2.2 square miles (5.7 km^{2}) (4.16%) is water.

== Demographics ==
As of the census of 2000, there were 239 people, 90 households, and 73 families residing in the township. The population density was 4.6 inhabitants per square mile (1.8/km^{2}). There were 103 housing units at an average density of 2.0 per square mile (0.77/km^{2}). The racial makeup of the township was 97.49% White, 1.67% African American, 0.42% Asian, and 0.42% from two or more races.

There were 90 households, out of which 35.6% had children under the age of 18 living with them, 70.0% were married couples living together, 5.6% had a female householder with no husband present, and 17.8% were non-families. 16.7% of all households were made up of individuals, and 4.4% had someone living alone who was 65 years of age or older. The average household size was 2.66 and the average family size was 2.99.

In the township the population was spread out, with 27.2% under the age of 18, 5.0% from 18 to 24, 30.1% from 25 to 44, 23.8% from 45 to 64, and 13.8% who were 65 years of age or older. The median age was 39 years. For every 100 females, there were 111.5 males. For every 100 females age 18 and over, there were 117.5 males.

The median income for a household in the township was $37,250, and the median income for a family was $40,694. Males had a median income of $25,625 versus $18,750 for females. The per capita income for the township was $15,992. About 2.6% of families and 4.0% of the population were below the poverty line, including 2.8% of those under the age of eighteen and none of those 65 or over.
