= Minnesota State Highway 7 =

Highway in Minnesota

Trunk Highway 7
- MN 7 highlighted in red

Route information
- Maintained by MnDOT
- Length: 194.174 mi (312.493 km)
- Existed: c. 1933–present
- Tourist routes: Minnesota River Valley Scenic Byway

Major junctions
- West end: MN 28 near Beardsley
- US 12 / US 75 at Ortonville; US 59 / MN 119 at Appleton; US 59 / MN 29 at Montevideo; MN 23 at Clara City; US 71 near Blomkest; I-494 at Minnetonka; US 169 at Hopkins
- East end: MN 100 at St. Louis Park

Location
- Country: United States
- State: Minnesota
- Counties: Big Stone, Swift, Chippewa, Kandiyohi, Meeker, McLeod, Carver, Hennepin

Highway system
- Minnesota Trunk Highway System; Interstate; US; State; Legislative; Scenic
← MN 6	→ US 8

Minnesota State Highway 7, or Trunk Highway 7, (MN 7, TH 7) is a state highway in Minnesota, which runs from its intersection with MN 28 near Beardsley and continues east to its terminus with MN 100 and County Road 25 (CR 25) in St. Louis Park. The highway runs east–west for approximately 194.2 miles (312.5 km) through mostly rural farmland in the central part of the state. On its western end, it is part of the Minnesota River Valley Scenic Byway where it runs northwest–southeast along the Minnesota River and associated lakes near the border with the adjoining state of South Dakota. For roughly 24 miles (39 km) of its route, it runs concurrently with U.S. Highway 59 (US 59) between Appleton and Montevideo. In Montevideo, the highway turns to the east cutting across the state. It passes through several small towns before entering the Twin Cities metropolitan area. In the metro area, MN 7 follows an expressway through several suburbs before terminating in St. Louis Park. Two different segments have been listed on the National Highway System, system of roads considered important to the country.

The highway was first designated along a series of roads between Appleton and Minneapolis around 1933. At first these roads were a mixture of gravel and bitumen surfaces, the latter a forerunner of today's asphalt. Within the first year or so, the western end was extended to terminate MN 7 in the Ortonville area. In 1958, the highway was extended to its modern western terminus at Beardsley by replacing another trunk highway. The section that is now an expressway in the Twin Cities was expanded by the 1950s, and the whole highway was paved in a hard-surface by the end of that decade. The highway was truncated in the Twin Cities to its current eastern terminus in the 1980s. The scenic byways designations were applied at the state and federal levels in 1995 and 2002, respectively.

== Route description ==
Legally, MN 7 is defined as several different constitutional and legislative routes in state law. The highway follows roadways defined as parts of constitutional routes 12 and 40 in Minnesota Statutes § 161.114. The remainder of the highway follows all, or part, of legislative routes 119, 147, 148, 304, and 319 in the Minnesota Statutes § 161.115. The highway is not marked with these routes number along the actual highway. The route of MN 7 between Ortonville and Montevideo along with the segment between I-494 and MN 100 in the Twin Cities have been listed on the National Highway System, a system of roads important to the nation's economy, defense, and mobility. Like other trunk highways in the state, MN 7 is maintained by the Minnesota Department of Transportation (MnDOT). According to the department, up 12,000 vehicles a day used the highway outside of the Twin Cities, and up to 55,000 vehicles traveled the highway daily in the metro area in 2010.

=== Beardsley to Montevideo ===
The highway starts at an intersection with MN 28 on the eastern edge of Beardsley and heads south. From here, MN 7 passes through farm fields before turning southeasterly along the shore of Big Stone Lake. The lake is the source of the Minnesota River and forms the Minnesota–South Dakota state line in Big Stone County. The highway in this area is also a part of the Minnesota River Valley Scenic Byway, a National Scenic Byway and a Minnesota State Scenic Byway. The road turns eastward along a bend in the lake near the community of Foster before running further inland around Big Stone Lake State Park. Past the park, MN 7 curves to the south along the shore and continues to Ortonville. The highway follows 2nd Street through town along the lake shore and through residential neighborhoods. South of the end of the lake, MN 7 merges with US 12, and the two highways run concurrently for about a couple blocks. South of town, MN 7 merges onto US 75 and the combined highway runs along the Minnesota River. The roadway also runs parallel to a line of the BNSF Railway used by the Twin Cities and Western Railroad in the area. East of the Big Stone National Wildlife Refuge and the town of Odessa, US 75 and the scenic byway turn south to cross the river, separating from MN 7 which continues along the northern banks of the river.

Near the town of Correll, MN 7 follows the northern shore of Marsh Lake to Appleton. The highway turns due east along Logan Avenue to enter town. MN 7 follows both US 59 and MN 119 in a triple concurrency on along Munsterman Street through town. At the intersection with Minnesota Street near the Swift County Fairgrounds, US 59/MN 7 turns southeasterly separating from MN 119. The highway then continues southeasterly running inland from Lac qui Parle through farm country to the town of Milan. There it crosses to the south side of the railroad before intersecting MN 40 and exiting town. In Watson, the scenic byway route rejoins MN 7 and follows it south to Montevideo. On the southern edge of the city, MN 7 turns northward, separating from US 59 and joining MN 29.

=== Montevideo to Hutchinson ===
Continuing northward in Montevideo, the highway turns back to the east between J. Harley Smith and Lagoon parks. MN 29 separates at the intersection between Washington Avenue and 8th Street, and MN 7 continues eastward on Washington through residential areas. The avenue passes the hospital before leaving town. The street name attached to the highway in rural Chippewa County is 50th Street as MN 7 runs due east through farm country. The highway crosses another line of the BNSF Railway and MN 23 in Clara City before meandering southwesterly to follow 60th Street near Bunde. East of this unincorporated community, the highway crosses into Kandiyohi County. The highway follows 195th Avenue through the southern part of the county, passing through the communities of Prinsburg and Lake Lillian. In between, it passes south of Blomkest where it intersects US 71.

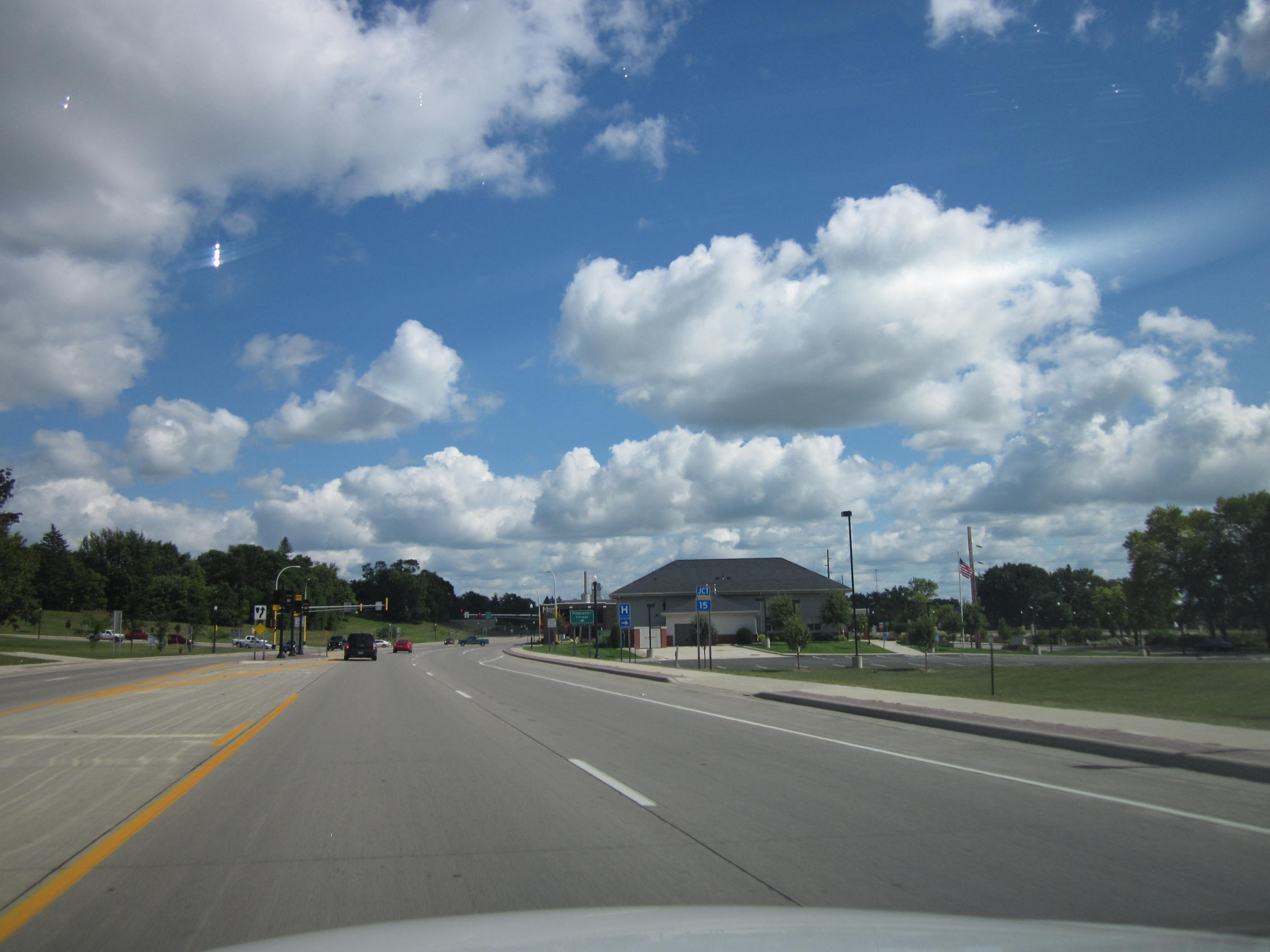
Intersection with MN 15 in Hutchinson

The next county along the course of MN 7 is Meeker County. Running due east through farmlands in the southern area of that county, the highway intersects MN 4 in Cosmos and passes through Cedar Mills. Just east of Cedar Mills, MN 7 crosses into McLeod County and merges with MN 22. The combined highway turns southeasterly toward Hutchinson. On the west side of town, the roadway crosses Campbell Lake and follows an arm of the lake through the downtown area. The highway passes several parks before coming to an intersection with MN 15 and exiting the business district for residential neighborhoods. MN 22 separates from MN 7 east of Hutchinson, and the latter highway continues eastward.

=== Hutchinson to St. Louis Park ===
In rural eastern McLeod County, MN 7 jogs to the north around Silver Lake in the city of the same name. Northeast of Lester Prairie, the highway crosses into Carver County. This area is also rural farm country as the roadway bypasses New Germany and Mayer to the north. Near the latter community, MN 7 intersects MN 25 which provides a connection to both Mayer and the city of Watertown. North of Waconia, the roadway begins to meander southeasterly through an area dotted with several lakes and crosses into the western edge of the Twin Cities metropolitan area.

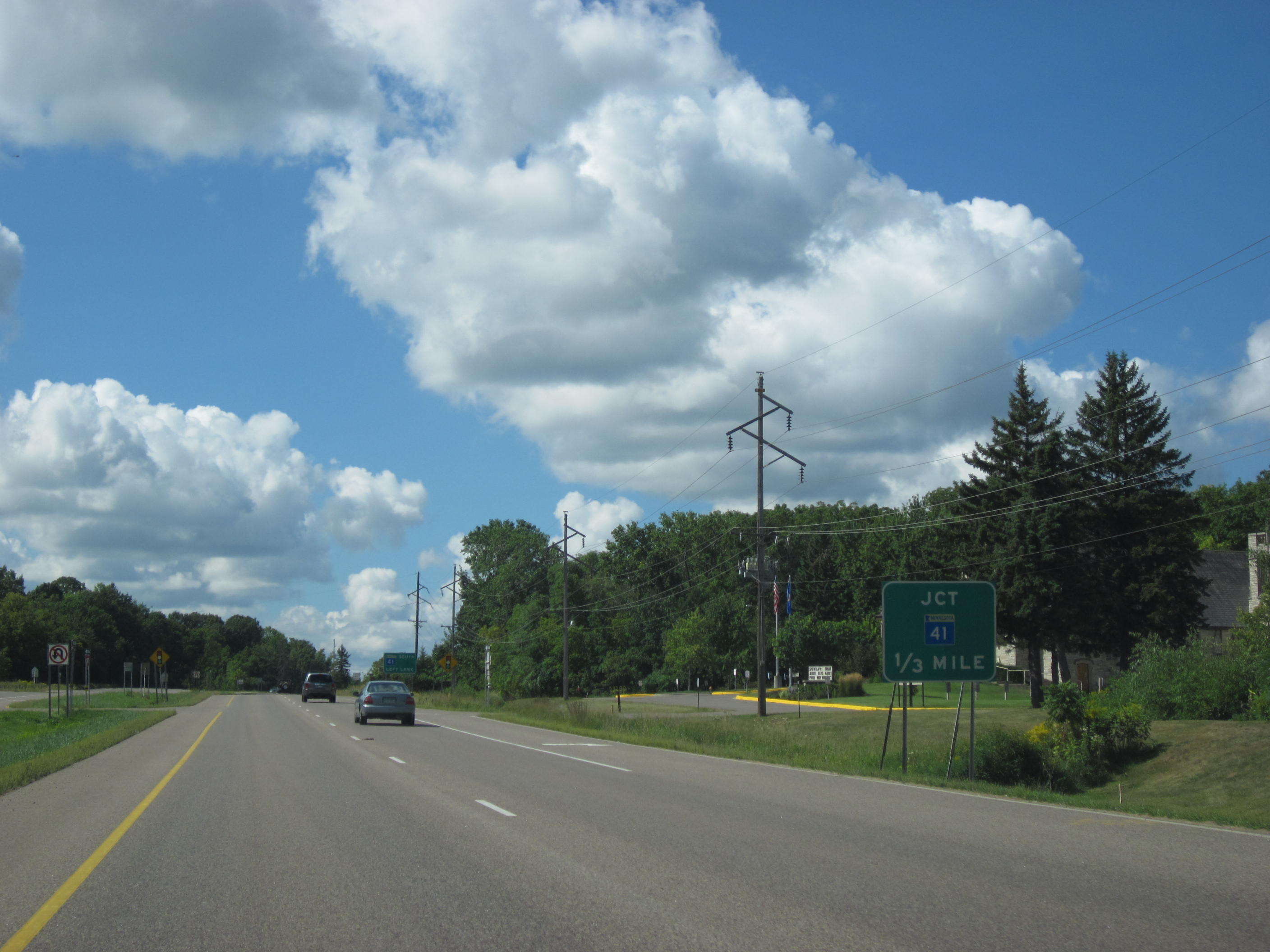
Approaching the MN 41 intersection in Shorewood

After briefly passing through Hennepin County in the communities of St. Bonifacius and Minnetrista, MN 7 crosses back into Carver County. In the city of Victoria the highway rounds the southern end of Lake Minnetonka. As MN 7 begins to turn back northeasterly, it crosses into western Hennepin County at Shorewood. The highway widens out to a four-lane divided highway near the intersection with MN 41. This divided highway has a partial interchange with Mill Street in Excelsior near the St. Albans Bay of Lake Minnetonka. This area transitions into a full suburban residential area by the time the highway crosses into Minnetonka. The highway passes north of the campus for Minnetonka High School near the intersection with County Road 101 (CR 101). Access to MN 7 through the area is restricted to major intersections only for the most part, making the highway an expressway rather than a true freeway. While still in Minnetonka, MN 7 passes through a cloverleaf interchange with Interstate 494 (I-494) which is one half of the Twin Cities' beltway. Immediately adjacent to the cloverleaf is another interchange for CR 60 (Baker Road). The expressway continues northeasterly through the suburb of Hopkins before crossing into St. Louis Park.

The western edge of St. Louis Park is marked by the interchange with US 169. The area immediately adjacent to MN 7 in this suburb is filled with commercial properties on either side of access roads. East of Texas Ave S, MN 7 becomes a freeway with three interchanges. The first is a dumbbell interchange with Louisiana Ave. East of Louisiana Avenue, the highway is parallel to a line of the Twin Cities and Western Railroad. There is another interchange for Wooddale Avenue before MN 7 meets, and terminates at, the interchange for MN 100 near the Peavey–Haglin Experimental Concrete Grain Elevator, the country's first concrete grain elevator. The expressway continues east for approximately another mile (1.6 km) as CR 25.

== History ==
First authorized in 1933–34, MN 7 ran between Appleton and the Twin Cities. At the time, the highway was under construction between Ortonville and Appleton. From its junction with MN 119, MN 7 was a gravel road southeasterly to Montevideo before turn east on a bituminous surface to Clara City. From there east to the Waconia area, the highway was gravel, and the remainder was bituminous. No sections at the time were paved in asphalt. The segment from Appleton northwesterly to Odessa was completed by the early part of 1935 connecting the highway to US 75. By 1952, the highway had been expanded to four lanes between Excelsior and the Twin Cities. In 1958, the highway was extended northwesterly along US 75 from Odessa to Ortonville and continuing on to Beardsley. The highway between Beardsley and Ortonville had been MN 103 since the 1930s.

The route was completely paved by 1959, the last section to be paved with at least bitumen was along the former MN 103 northwest of Ortonville. MN 7 used to extend into downtown Minneapolis until 1965, where it terminated at its intersection with Washington Avenue (old US 52). From 1965 to either 1987 or 1988, the eastern terminus was located at the intersection of Lake Street and France Avenue in Minneapolis; the part, about one mile (1.6 km) long, between the interchange with MN 100 and the intersection of Lake Street and France Avenue is now called County State-Aid Highway 25. In 1995, the section between MN 28 and the southern US 75 junction was named a Minnesota State Scenic Byway; it was also made a National Scenic Byway on June 13, 2002.

== Major intersections ==
County	Location	mi	km	Destinations	Notes
Big Stone	Browns Valley Township	0.000	0.000	MN 28 / Minnesota River Valley Scenic Byway – Beardsley, Morris	Western terminus
Big Stone	Ortonville	26.138	42.065	US 12 west – Milbank SD	West end of US 12 concurrency
Big Stone	Ortonville	26.267	42.273	US 12 east / Minnesota River Valley Scenic Byway – Benson	East end of US 12 concurrency
Big Stone	Ortonville	27.028	43.497	US 75 north / Minnesota River Valley Scenic Byway	West end of US 75 concurrency
Big Stone	Odessa Township	34.336	55.258	US 75 south – Madison	East end of US 75 concurrency
Swift	Appleton	48.266	77.677	US 59 north / MN 119 north – Morris	West end of US 59 and MN 119 concurrencies
Swift	Appleton	49.084	78.993	MN 119 south – MN 40	East end of MN 119 concurrency
Chippewa	Milan	57.529	92.584	MN 40 – Madison, Willmar	
Chippewa	Montevideo	72.553	116.763	US 59 south / MN 29 south / Minnesota River Valley Scenic Byway – Granite Falls, Marshall	East end of US 59 concurrency; west end of MN 29 concurrency
Chippewa	Montevideo	73.838	118.831	MN 29 north – Benson	East end of MN 29 concurrency
Chippewa	Stoneham Township	85.850	138.162	CSAH 4 – Maynard, Gluek	Formerly MN 277 north
Chippewa	Stoneham Township	90.719	145.998	MN 23	
Kandiyohi	Roseland Township	107.279	172.649	US 71 – Willmar, Redwood Falls	
Meeker	Cosmos	124.332	200.093	MN 4 – Sauk Centre, St. James	
McLeod	Melrose Township	134.125	215.853	MN 22 north – Litchfield	West end of MN 22 concurrency
McLeod	Hutchinson	141.951	228.448	MN 15 – St. Cloud, Fairmont	
McLeod	Hutchinson Township	143.747	231.338	MN 22 south – Mankato	East end of MN 22 concurrency
McLeod	Winsted Township	157.894	254.106	CSAH 1 – Lester Prairie, Winsted	Formerly MN 261
Carver	Watertown Township	166.929– 166.975	268.646– 268.720	MN 25 – Mayer, Watertown	Roundabout
Hennepin	No major junctions				
Carver	No major junctions				
Hennepin	Saint Bonifacius	173.070	278.529	CSAH 92 (Main Street)	
Hennepin	Shorewood	181.884	292.714	MN 41 south – Chaska	Northern terminus of MN 41
Hennepin	Excelsior	182.671	293.980	CSAH 19 north (Oak Street)	
Hennepin	Excelsior	182.991	294.495	CSAH 82 (Mill Street)	Eastbound entrance only
Hennepin	Excelsior	183.327	295.036	To CSAH 82 (Mill Street) / 2nd Street / Old Log Way	Westbound exit only, CSAH 82/Mill Street not signed
Hennepin	Minnetonka	186.128	299.544	CSAH 101	Formerly MN 101
Hennepin	Minnetonka	188.807	303.855	I-494	Exit 16 on I-494
Hennepin	Minnetonka	189.014	304.189	CSAH 60 (Baker Road)	No westbound entrance
Hennepin	Minnetonka	189.550	305.051	Lake Street Extension	Westbound entrance only
Hennepin	Hopkins	189.980	305.743	CSAH 61 (Shady Oak Road)	
Hennepin	Hopkins	190.435	306.475	CSAH 73 north (Hopkins Crossroad) / 17th Avenue	
Hennepin	Hopkins	191.632	308.402	US 169	
Hennepin	St. Louis Park	192.991	310.589	Louisiana Avenue	Dumbbell interchange
Hennepin	St. Louis Park	193.646	311.643	Wooddale Avenue	
Hennepin	St. Louis Park	194.174	312.493	MN 100 / CSAH 25	Eastern terminus
1.000 mi = 1.609 km; 1.000 km = 0.621 mi: Concurrency terminus; Incomplete access
