= Stevens Township, Stevens County, Minnesota =

Stevens Township, Minnesota
- Township
- Location within the state of Minnesota Stevens Township, Minnesota (the United States)
- Coordinates: 45°26′54″N 96°11′24″W
- Country: United States
- State: Minnesota
- County: Stevens

Area
  - Total: 36.0 sq mi (93.2 km^{2})
  - Land: 35.8 sq mi (92.6 km^{2})
  - Water: 0.19 sq mi (0.5 km^{2})
- Elevation: 1,119 ft (341 m)

Population (2000)
  - Total: 82
  - Density: 2.3/sq mi (0.9/km^{2})
- Time zone: UTC-6 (Central (CST))
  - Summer (DST): UTC-5 (CDT)
- FIPS code: 27-62752
- GNIS feature ID: 0665708

Stevens Township is a township in Stevens County, Minnesota, United States. The population was 67 at the 2020 census.

Stevens Township took its name from Stevens County.

== Geography ==
According to the United States Census Bureau, the township has a total area of 36.0 square miles (93.2 km^{2}), of which 35.8 square miles (92.6 km^{2}) is land and 0.2 square mile (0.5 km^{2}) (0.58%) is water.

== Demographics ==
As of the census of 2000, there were 82 people, 32 households, and 23 families residing in the township. The population density was 2.3 people per square mile (0.9/km^{2}). There were 37 housing units at an average density of 1.0/sq mi (0.4/km^{2}). The racial makeup of the township was 91.46% White, and 8.54% from two or more races.

There were 32 households, out of which 25.0% had children under the age of 18 living with them, 62.5% were married couples living together, 3.1% had a female householder with no husband present, and 28.1% were non-families. 18.8% of all households were made up of individuals, and 9.4% had someone living alone who was 65 years of age or older. The average household size was 2.56 and the average family size was 3.04.

In the township the population was spread out, with 24.4% under the age of 18, 3.7% from 18 to 24, 24.4% from 25 to 44, 36.6% from 45 to 64, and 11.0% who were 65 years of age or older. The median age was 43 years. For every 100 females, there were 134.3 males. For every 100 females age 18 and over, there were 113.8 males.

The median income for a household in the township was $35,938, and the median income for a family was $37,188. Males had a median income of $17,750 versus $13,750 for females. The per capita income for the township was $14,798. There were 21.1% of families and 40.0% of the population living below the poverty line, including 100.0% of under eighteens and none of those over 64.
