= Minnesota State Highway 28 =

State highway in Minnesota, United States

Trunk Highway 28
- MN 28 highlighted in red

Route information
- Maintained by MnDOT
- Length: 142.324 mi (229.048 km)
- Existed: 1920–present

Major junctions
- West end: SD 10 at the South Dakota state line near Browns Valley
- MN 27 near Browns Valley; MN 7 near Beardsley; US 75 in Graceville; US 59 / MN 9 in Morris; MN 29 / MN 55 in Glenwood; I-94 / US 71 / US 52 in Sauk Centre; MN 287 in Grey Eagle
- East end: MN 27 / CR 52 in Little Falls

Location
- Country: United States
- State: Minnesota
- Counties: Traverse, Big Stone, Stevens, Pope, Stearns, Todd, Morrison

Highway system
- Minnesota Trunk Highway System; Interstate; US; State; Legislative; Scenic
← MN 27	→ MN 29

Minnesota State Highway 28 (MN 28) is a 142.324-mile-long (229.048 km) state highway in west-central and central Minnesota, which travels from South Dakota Highway 10 at the South Dakota state line near Browns Valley and continues east to its intersection with the former route of U.S. Highway 10 (US 10) in Little Falls.

== Route description ==
MN 28 serves as an east–west route between Browns Valley, Morris, Glenwood, Sauk Centre, and Little Falls.

The western terminus for MN 28 is at the South Dakota state line in Browns Valley, at the Little Minnesota River, where MN 28 becomes South Dakota Highway 10 upon crossing the state line.

MN 28 parallels MN 27 throughout its route until MN 27 enters Wheaton, Minnesota and then follows Mud Lake and Lake Traverse, heading South/Southwest to Browns Valley, Minnesota where it connects with MN 28.

The Sam Brown Memorial State Wayside Park is located on MN 28 in Traverse County at Browns Valley.

The highway overlaps MN 27 for the last 14 miles (23 km) of its route, until its terminus in Little Falls at the former alignment of US 10, which is now a city street.

MN 28 is legally defined as Constitutional Route 28 in the Minnesota Statutes.

== History ==
State Highway 28 was established November 2, 1920, traveling from the South Dakota border at Browns Valley to Little Falls.

By 1923, the road was mostly graveled except at its extreme western and eastern ends. The remainder was graveled by 1929.

The roadway was paved throughout the 1930s and was paved in full by 1940.

In 1934, the newly-marked State Highway 27 was overlapped with the eastern end of the route. The eastern terminus of Highway 28 remained at U.S. 10; however, when the bypass of 10 around Little Falls was built in the mid-1970s, 28 was not extended across the river and its terminus remains at Lindbergh Drive.

== Major intersections ==
County	Location	mi	km	Destinations	Notes
Traverse	Folsom Township	0.000	0.000	SD 10 west – Sisseton	Continuation into South Dakota
Traverse	Folsom Township	0.874	1.407	MN 27 east – Wheaton	Western terminus of MN 27
Big Stone	Browns Valley Township	9.251	14.888	MN 7 east / Minnesota River Valley Scenic Byway – Ortonville	Western terminus of MN 7
Big Stone	Graceville	22.606	36.381	US 75 – Wheaton, Ortonville	
Stevens	Morris	48.053	77.334	MN 9 south – Benson	Western end of MN 9 concurrency
Stevens	Morris	48.561	78.151	MN 9 north – Breckenridge	Eastern end of MN 9 concurrency
Stevens	Morris Township	50.601	81.434	US 59 – Appleton, Elbow Lake	
Pope	Starbuck	67.768	109.062	MN 29 south (Main Street south) / MN 114 north (Main Street north)	Western end of MN 29 concurrency
Pope	Long Beach	74.486	119.874	CSAH 24 / Glacial Ridge Trail	
Pope	Long Beach	74.834	120.434	Golf Course Road / Glacial Ridge Trail	
Pope	Glenwood	76.276	122.754	MN 29 north (Franklin Street North) / MN 104 south (Franklin Street South)	Eastern end of MN 29 concurrency
Pope	Glenwood	77.429– 77.550	124.610– 124.805	MN 55 – Elbow Lake, Belgrade	Interchange
Stearns	Sauk Centre Township	101.723	163.707	US 71 south – Willmar	Southern end of US 71 concurrency
Stearns	Sauk Centre	104.505– 104.669	168.184– 168.448	I-94 (US 52) – Alexandria, St. Cloud	Interchange; I-94 exit 127
Stearns	Sauk Centre	104.539	168.239	CSAH 72 / CR 186	Former US 52
Stearns	Sauk Centre Township	104.713	168.519	US 71 north – Long Prairie	Northern end of US 71 concurrency
Todd	Grey Eagle	116.338	187.228	MN 287	
Morrison	Culdrum Township	130.513	210.040	MN 27 west – Long Prairie	Western end of MN 27 concurrency
Morrison	Pike Creek Township	142.422	229.206	MN 238 south – Albany	Northern terminus of MN 238
Morrison	Little Falls	144.429	232.436	MN 27 east / Great River Road (National Route) – Lindbergh State Park, Lindbergh Historic Site, Weyerhaeuser Museum	Eastern terminus; eastern end of MN 27 concurrency; GRR north is former US 10 (Lindbergh Drive)
1.000 mi = 1.609 km; 1.000 km = 0.621 mi: Concurrency terminus
