= Clarence C. Mitchell =

American lawyer and politician

- Born: March 4, 1897; Amiret, Minnesota, U.S.
- Died: June 25, 1986 (aged 89); Hillcrest Retirement Center
- Education: University of Minnesota Law School
- Occupations: Lawyer; Minnesota Senator
- Years active: 1947-1966
- Political party: Nonpartisan Election-Conservative Caucus

Clarence C. Mitchell (March 4, 1897 – June 25, 1986) was an American lawyer and politician.

Mitchell was born on a farm in Arimet, Lyon County, Minnesota, and graduated from Tracy High School in Tracy, Minnesota. He received his law degree from University of Minnesota Law School in 1923 and was admitted to the Minnesota bar. He lived in Princeton, Minnesota, with his wife and family. Mitchell served as the Mille Lacs County Attorney on the Princeton School Board from 1942 to 1946. He served in the Minnesota Senate from 1947 to 1966. Michell died at the Hillcrest Retirement Center in Minnetonka, Minnesota.
