= Clifton Township, Minnesota =

Clifton Township is the name of some places in the U.S. state of Minnesota:

- Clifton Township, Lyon County, Minnesota
- Clifton Township, Traverse County, Minnesota

== See also ==
- Clifton Township (disambiguation)
