= Clifton Township =

Clifton Township may refer to:

== Arkansas ==
- Clifton Township, Faulkner County, Arkansas, in Faulkner County, Arkansas

== Kansas ==
- Clifton Township, Washington County, Kansas, in Washington County, Kansas
- Clifton Township, Wilson County, Kansas

== Minnesota ==
- Clifton Township, Lyon County, Minnesota
- Clifton Township, Traverse County, Minnesota

== Missouri ==
- Clifton Township, Randolph County, Missouri

== North Carolina ==
- Clifton Township, Ashe County, North Carolina

== North Dakota ==
- Clifton Township, North Dakota, in Cass County

== Pennsylvania ==
- Clifton Township, Lackawanna County, Pennsylvania

== South Dakota ==
- Clifton Township, Beadle County, South Dakota, in Beadle County, South Dakota
- Clifton Township, Spink County, South Dakota, in Spink County, South Dakota
