= Green Valley, Minnesota =

- Unincorporated community
- Location within Minnesota Location within the United States
- Coordinates: 44°31′37″N 95°45′26″W
- Country: United States
- State: Minnesota
- County: Lyon
- Township: Fairview
- Elevation: 1,099 ft (335 m)
- Time zone: UTC-6 (Central (CST))
  - Summer (DST): UTC-5 (CDT)
- ZIP code: 56258
- Area code: 507
- GNIS feature ID: 644426

Green Valley is an unincorporated community in Fairview Township, Lyon County, Minnesota, United States.

The community is located between the cities of Marshall and Cottonwood near the junction of Minnesota State Highway 23 (MN 23) and Lyon County State-Aid Highway 8.

== History ==
Green Valley was platted in 1888, and named for its location in the green valley of the Redwood River. A post office was established in Green Valley in 1889, and remained in operation until 1964.
