= Will Newton Nelson =

American politician (1897–1953)

Will Newton Nelson (April 7, 1897 – July 25, 1953) was an American farmer and politician.

Nelson was born in Amiret Township, Lyon County, Minnesota. He graduated from Tracy High School in Tracy, Minnesota. Nelson lived in Tracy, Minnesota with his wife and family and was a farmer and was involved with cattle bred. Nelson served in the Minnesota House of Representatives from 1939 until his death in 1953 while still in office.
