= Clifton Township, Kansas =

Clifton Township, Kansas may refer to the following places:

- Clifton Township, Washington County, Kansas
- Clifton Township, Wilson County, Kansas

== See also ==
- List of Kansas townships
- Clifton Township (disambiguation)
