= Lake Marshall =

Lake Marshall or Marshall Lake may refer to:

== Cities, towns, townships etc. ==
- Lake Marshall Township, a township in Lyon County, Minnesota

== Lakes ==
- Marshall Lake (Idaho), a glacial lake in Custer County, Idaho
- Lake Marshall (Lyon County, Minnesota)
- Marshall Lake (Montana), in Missoula County, Montana
