= Minnesota State Highway 91 =

State highway in Minnesota, United States

Trunk Highway 91
- MN 91 highlighted in red

Route information
- Maintained by MnDOT
- Length: 61.456 mi (98.904 km)
- Existed: 1933–present

Major junctions
- South end: CR L14 at the Iowa state line near Ellsworth
- I-90 at Adrian; MN 30 at Lake Wilson; US 14 at Rock Lake–Shelburne townships
- North end: MN 23 at Russell

Location
- Country: United States
- State: Minnesota
- Counties: Nobles, Murray, Lyon

Highway system
- Minnesota Trunk Highway System; Interstate; US; State; Legislative; Scenic
← I-90	→ MN 92

Minnesota State Highway 91 (MN 91) is a 61.456-mile-long (98.904 km) highway in southwest Minnesota. It runs from Lyon County Road L14 at the Iowa state line near Ellsworth northward to State Highway 23 at Russell.

== Route description ==
Highway 91 serves as a north–south route in southwest Minnesota between Russell, Lake Wilson, Adrian, Ellsworth, and the Iowa state line. It is an important corridor for north–south truck traffic in the region.

Highway 91 is also known as Broadway Street in Ellsworth. The route follows Maine Avenue in Adrian. It follows College Avenue and Minnesota Avenue in Lake Wilson.

Highway 91 has an interchange with Interstate 90 at Adrian.

The route is legally defined as Legislative Route 91 in the Minnesota Statutes.

== History ==
Highway 91 was authorized in 1933. Previously, Ellsworth and Lismore in Nobles County had been connected via a gravel road constructed c. 1915 – c. 1920.

In July 1938, a bridge near Chandler was washed out by floods and was replaced with a 3-mile (4.8 km) detour.

In 1942, only a portion of Highway 91 north of Adrian was paved. Highway 91 was paved between Adrian and the Iowa state line by 1953. The remainder of the route was paved by 1960.

A 45-mile (72 km) section of the route underwent extensive rehabilitation from 2019 to 2020. The project included repaving of the roadway, along with bridge and box culvert replacement and an upgrade of the sidewalks in Lake Wilson. The cost of the project was reduced by bundling the separate projects, which spanned the three counties through which the route travels, into a single bid.

The bridge over Interstate 90 in Adrian was replaced in 2021.

== Major intersections ==
County	Location	mi	km	Destinations	Notes
Nobles	Grand Prairie Township	0.000	0.000	CR L14 south	Continuation into Iowa; former Iowa 91
Nobles	Adrian	13.400	21.565	CSAH 35 (Pearl Street)	Former US 16
Nobles	Adrian	13.807	22.220	I-90 – Luverne, Worthington	Interchange
Murray	Lake Wilson	38.402	61.802	MN 30 east – Slayton	Eastern end of MN 30 overlap
Murray	Lake Wilson	38.707	62.293	MN 30 west – Pipestone	Western end of MN 30 overlap
Lyon	Shelburne–Rock Lake township line	56.446	90.841	US 14 – Balaton, Florence	
Lyon	Russell	61.456	98.904	MN 23 – Marshall	
1.000 mi = 1.609 km; 1.000 km = 0.621 mi: Concurrency terminus
