= Sodus =

There are a few places named Sodus in the United States:

- Sodus, New York
- Sodus (village), New York
- Sodus Point, New York
- Sodus Township (disambiguation)
- Sodus Bay, a bay on the south shore of Lake Ontario, Wayne County, New York

== Other ==
Sodus, a taxonomic synonym for a genus of beetles, Similosodus
