= Dudley, Minnesota =

- Unincorporated community
- Location within Minnesota Location within the United States
- Coordinates: 44°25′30″N 95°41′29″W
- Country: United States
- State: Minnesota
- County: Lyon
- Township: Clifton
- Elevation: 1,148 ft (350 m)
- Time zone: UTC-6 (Central (CST))
  - Summer (DST): UTC-5 (CDT)
- Area code: 507
- GNIS feature ID: 654678

Dudley is an unincorporated community in Lyon County, in the U.S. state of Minnesota.

== History ==
Dudley was platted in 1902. It was named after Dudley, Massachusetts. A post office was established at Dudley in 1903, and closed in 1907.
