= Iowa Highway 91 =

State highway in Iowa, United States

Iowa Highway 91
- Iowa 91 highlighted in red

Route information
- Length: 4.643 mi (7.472 km)
- Existed: 1980–2003

Major junctions
- South end: Iowa 9 east of Rock Rapids
- North end: MN 91 south of Ellsworth, Minn.

Location
- Country: United States
- State: Iowa
- Counties: Lyon

Highway system
- Iowa Primary Highway System; Interstate; US; State; Secondary; Scenic
← Iowa 86	→ Iowa 92

Iowa Highway 91 (Iowa 91) was a short state highway in northwestern Iowa. It began at Iowa 9 between Rock Rapids and Little Rock and ended at the Minnesota state line. It continued north as Minnesota State Highway 91. The highway was part of the primary highway system for 23 years; it was designated in 1980 and removed in 2003. After it was turned over, it became County Road L14.

== Route description ==
Iowa 91 began in rural Lyon County at an intersection with Iowa 9 at a point nearly equidistant to Rock Rapids in the west, Little Rock east, and George south. It headed north over flat terrain with farmland on both sides of the highway. Near the midpoint of the route, it crossed a branch of Tom Creek, which itself is a branch of the Rock River. The highway ended at the Minnesota state line south of Ellsworth. It continued north as Minnesota State Highway 91.

== History ==
Iowa 91 was designated in late 1980 when the Iowa Department of Transportation took over control of County Road K64 (CR K64) in Lyon County; however, it did not show up on the state map until the 1983 edition. The route was paved when it was added to the primary highway system. In 2002, more than 700 miles (1,100 km) of low-traffic state highways, including Iowa 91, were identified by the Iowa DOT because they primarily served local traffic. Typically, when the DOT wished to transfer a road to a county or locality, both parties had to agree to terms and the DOT would have to either improve the road or give money to the other party to maintain the road. However, with the significant mileage the DOT wished to turn over, the Iowa General Assembly passed a law which granted the DOT a one-time exemption from the transfer rules effective July 1, 2003. Iowa 91 was replaced by CR L14.

== Major intersections ==
The entire route was in Midland Township, Lyon County.

mi	km	Destinations	Notes
0.000	0.000	Iowa 9 – Rock Rapids, Spirit Lake	
4.643	7.472	MN 91 north – Ellsworth	
1.000 mi = 1.609 km; 1.000 km = 0.621 mi
