= Nordland Township, Minnesota =

Nordland Township is the name of the following places in the U.S. state of Minnesota:

- Nordland Township, Aitkin County, Minnesota
- Nordland Township, Lyon County, Minnesota
