= Burchard, Minnesota =

- Unincorporated community
- Location within Minnesota Location within the United States
- Coordinates: 44°15′22″N 95°59′25″W
- Country: United States
- State: Minnesota
- County: Lyon
- Township: Shelburne
- Elevation: 1,673 ft (510 m)
- Time zone: UTC-6 (Central (CST))
  - Summer (DST): UTC-5 (CDT)
- Area code: 507
- GNIS feature ID: 640651

Burchard is an unincorporated community in Lyon County, in the U.S. state of Minnesota.

== History ==
Burchard was laid out in 1886 by the railroad. It was named for H. M. Burchard, a railroad official.

A post office was established in Burchard in 1886, and remained in operation until it was discontinued in 1945.
