= Stanley Township =

Stanley Township may refer to:

== Canada ==
- Stanley Township, a historic township in Huron County, Ontario

== United States ==
- Stanley Township, Arkansas County, Arkansas
- Stanley Township, Lyon County, Minnesota
- Stanley Township, Cass County, North Dakota

== See also ==
- Stanley (disambiguation)
