= Similosodus torui =

Scientific classification
- Kingdom: Animalia
- Phylum: Arthropoda
- Class: Insecta
- Order: Coleoptera
- Suborder: Polyphaga
- Infraorder: Cucujiformia
- Family: Cerambycidae
- Genus: Similosodus
- Species: S. torui

Binomial name
- Similosodus torui Holzschuh, 1989

Species of beetle

Similosodus torui is a species of beetle in the family Cerambycidae. It was described by Holzschuh in 1989.
