= Similosodus verticalis =

Scientific classification
- Kingdom: Animalia
- Phylum: Arthropoda
- Clade: Pancrustacea
- Class: Insecta
- Order: Coleoptera
- Suborder: Polyphaga
- Infraorder: Cucujiformia
- Family: Cerambycidae
- Genus: Similosodus
- Species: S. verticalis

Binomial name
- Similosodus verticalis (Pascoe, 1865)

Synonyms
- Sodus verticalis Pascoe, 1865

Species of beetle

Similosodus verticalis is a species of beetle in the family Cerambycidae. It was described by Francis Polkinghorne Pascoe in 1865, originally under the genus Sodus. It is known from Malaysia, Java, and Singapore.
