= Lake Marshall Township, Lyon County, Minnesota =

Lake Marshall Township, Minnesota
- Township
- Location within the state of Minnesota Lake Marshall Township, Minnesota (the United States)
- Coordinates: 44°25′15″N 95°48′5″W
- Country: United States
- State: Minnesota
- County: Lyon

Area
  - Total: 30.0 sq mi (77.6 km^{2})
  - Land: 29.6 sq mi (76.6 km^{2})
  - Water: 0.39 sq mi (1.0 km^{2})
- Elevation: 1,152 ft (351 m)

Population (2000)
  - Total: 517
  - Density: 17/sq mi (6.7/km^{2})
- Time zone: UTC-6 (Central (CST))
  - Summer (DST): UTC-5 (CDT)
- FIPS code: 27-34712
- GNIS feature ID: 0664689

Lake Marshall Township is a township in Lyon County, Minnesota, United States. The population was 517 at the 2000 census.

Lake Marshall Township was organized in 1872, and named for Lake Marshall.

== Geography ==
According to the United States Census Bureau, the township has a total area of 30.0 square miles (78 km^{2}), of which 29.6 square miles (77 km^{2}) is land and 0.4 square miles (1.0 km^{2}) (1.30%) is water.

== Demographics ==
As of the census of 2000, there were 517 people, 183 households, and 144 families residing in the township. The population density was 17.5 inhabitants per square mile (6.8/km^{2}). There were 193 housing units at an average density of 6.5 per square mile (2.5/km^{2}). The racial makeup of the township was 98.45% White, 0.19% African American, 0.77% Asian, 0.58% from other races. Hispanic or Latino of any race were 0.58% of the population.

There were 183 households, out of which 40.4% had children under the age of 18 living with them, 71.0% were married couples living together, 2.7% had a female householder with no husband present, and 20.8% were non-families. 15.3% of all households were made up of individuals, and 6.0% had someone living alone who was 65 years of age or older. The average household size was 2.83 and the average family size was 3.17.

In the township the population was spread out, with 30.6% under the age of 18, 6.6% from 18 to 24, 28.4% from 25 to 44, 28.2% from 45 to 64, and 6.2% who were 65 years of age or older. The median age was 36 years. For every 100 females, there were 104.3 males. For every 100 females age 18 and over, there were 108.7 males.

The median income for a household in the township was $56,607, and the median income for a family was $62,344. Males had a median income of $38,333 versus $25,769 for females. The per capita income for the township was $21,461. About 1.4% of families and 4.1% of the population were below the poverty line, including 1.8% of those under age 18 and 12.1% of those age 65 or over.
