= Monroe Township, Lyon County, Minnesota =

Monroe Township, Minnesota
- Township
- Location within the state of Minnesota Monroe Township, Minnesota (the United States)
- Coordinates: 44°13′54″N 95°38′56″W
- Country: United States
- State: Minnesota
- County: Lyon

Area
  - Total: 34.2 sq mi (88.5 km^{2})
  - Land: 33.9 sq mi (87.8 km^{2})
  - Water: 0.31 sq mi (0.8 km^{2})
- Elevation: 1,410 ft (430 m)

Population (2000)
  - Total: 242
  - Density: 7.3/sq mi (2.8/km^{2})
- Time zone: UTC-6 (Central (CST))
  - Summer (DST): UTC-5 (CDT)
- FIPS code: 27-43666
- GNIS feature ID: 0665009

Monroe Township is a township in Lyon County, Minnesota, United States. The population was 242 at the 2000 census.

Monroe Township was organized in 1874, and named after Monroe, Wisconsin, the native home of some first settlers.

== Geography ==
According to the United States Census Bureau, the township has a total area of 34.2 square miles (88.6 km^{2}), of which 33.9 square miles (87.8 km^{2}) is land and 0.3 square mile (0.8 km^{2}) (0.85%) is water.

== Demographics ==
As of the census of 2000, there were 242 people, 89 households, and 64 families residing in the township. The population density was 7.1 people per square mile (2.8/km^{2}). There were 97 housing units at an average density of 2.9/sq mi (1.1/km^{2}). The racial makeup of the township was 98.35% White, 0.41% Asian, 1.24% from other races. Hispanic or Latino of any race were 4.13% of the population.

There were 89 households, out of which 38.2% had children under the age of 18 living with them, 71.9% were married couples living together, and 27.0% were non-families. 21.3% of all households were made up of individuals, and 4.5% had someone living alone who was 65 years of age or older. The average household size was 2.72 and the average family size was 3.25.

In the township the population was spread out, with 29.8% under the age of 18, 7.4% from 18 to 24, 29.8% from 25 to 44, 19.0% from 45 to 64, and 14.0% who were 65 years of age or older. The median age was 37 years. For every 100 females, there were 118.0 males. For every 100 females age 18 and over, there were 123.7 males.

The median income for a household in the township was $43,542, and the median income for a family was $45,568. Males had a median income of $31,125 versus $25,208 for females. The per capita income for the township was $18,952. About 2.7% of families and 3.1% of the population were below the poverty line, including none of those under the age of eighteen and 14.7% of those 65 or over.
