= Similosodus samaranus =

Scientific classification
- Kingdom: Animalia
- Phylum: Arthropoda
- Class: Insecta
- Order: Coleoptera
- Suborder: Polyphaga
- Infraorder: Cucujiformia
- Family: Cerambycidae
- Genus: Similosodus
- Species: S. samaranus

Binomial name
- Similosodus samaranus (Heller, 1926)

Synonyms
- Similosodus (Transversesodus) samaranus (Heller, 1926)

Species of beetle

Similosodus samaranus is a species of beetle in the family Cerambycidae. It was described by Heller in 1926.
