= Grandview Township, Lyon County, Minnesota =

Grandview Township, Minnesota
- Township
- Location within the state of Minnesota Grandview Township, Minnesota (the United States)
- Coordinates: 44°30′23″N 95°53′42″W
- Country: United States
- State: Minnesota
- County: Lyon

Area
  - Total: 35.2 sq mi (91.1 km^{2})
  - Land: 35.2 sq mi (91.1 km^{2})
  - Water: 0 sq mi (0.0 km^{2})
- Elevation: 1,168 ft (356 m)

Population (2000)
  - Total: 317
  - Density: 9.1/sq mi (3.5/km^{2})
- Time zone: UTC-6 (Central (CST))
  - Summer (DST): UTC-5 (CDT)
- FIPS code: 27-25154
- GNIS feature ID: 0664320

Grandview Township is a township in Lyon County, Minnesota, United States. The population was 317 at the 2000 census.

Grandview Township was organized in the 1870s, and named for the scenic views from the Coteau des Prairies.

== Geography ==
According to the United States Census Bureau, the township has a total area of 35.2 square miles (91 km^{2}), of which 35.2 square miles (91 km^{2}) is land and 0.03% is water.

== Demographics ==
As of the census of 2000, there were 317 people, 100 households, and 80 families residing in the township. The population density was 9.0 inhabitants per square mile (3.5/km^{2}). There were 104 housing units at an average density of 3.0 per square mile (1.2/km^{2}). The racial makeup of the township was 98.42% White, and 1.58% from two or more races. Hispanic or Latino of any race were 0.63% of the population.

There were 100 households, out of which 40.0% had children under the age of 18 living with them, 69.0% were married couples living together, 5.0% had a female householder with no husband present, and 20.0% were non-families. 19.0% of all households were made up of individuals, and 5.0% had someone living alone who was 65 years of age or older. The average household size was 3.17 and the average family size was 3.60.

In the township the population was spread out, with 34.7% under the age of 18, 9.8% from 18 to 24, 26.2% from 25 to 44, 20.8% from 45 to 64, and 8.5% who were 65 years of age or older. The median age was 30 years. For every 100 females, there were 111.3 males. For every 100 females age 18 and over, there were 109.1 males.

The median income for a household in the township was $46,000, and the median income for a family was $51,875. Males had a median income of $33,125 versus $25,536 for females. The per capita income for the township was $16,470. About 2.4% of families and 3.3% of the population were below the poverty line, including none of those under the age of 18 and 7.4% of those 65 and older.
