= Eidsvold Township, Lyon County, Minnesota =

Eidsvold Township, Minnesota
- Township
- Location within the state of Minnesota Eidsvold Township, Minnesota (the United States)
- Coordinates: 44°36′N 96°1′W
- Country: United States
- State: Minnesota
- County: Lyon

Area
  - Total: 33.6 sq mi (87.0 km^{2})
  - Land: 33.5 sq mi (86.8 km^{2})
  - Water: 0.077 sq mi (0.2 km^{2})
- Elevation: 1,175 ft (358 m)

Population (2000)
  - Total: 223
  - Density: 6.7/sq mi (2.6/km^{2})
- Time zone: UTC-6 (Central (CST))
  - Summer (DST): UTC-5 (CDT)
- FIPS code: 27-18332
- GNIS feature ID: 0664056

Eidsvold Township is a township in Lyon County, Minnesota, United States. It was organized in 1873, and named for Ejdsvold (Eidsvoll), Akershus, Norway, whence many of its early settlers came. The population was 223 at the 2000 census.

== Geography ==
According to the United States Census Bureau, the township has a total area of 33.6 square miles (87 km^{2}), of which 33.5 square miles (87 km^{2}) is land and 0.1 square miles (0.26 km^{2}) (0.21%) is water.

== Demographics ==
As of the census of 2000, there were 223 people, 81 households, and 58 families residing in the township. The population density was 6.7 people per square mile (2.6 people/km^{2}). There were 88 housing units at an average density of 2.6 per square mile (1.0/km^{2}). The racial makeup of the township was 96.86% White, 1.35% from other races, and 1.79% from two or more races. Hispanic or Latino of any race were 3.14% of the population.

There were 81 households, out of which 43.2% had children under the age of 18 living with them, 66.7% were married couples living together, 3.7% had a female householder with no husband present, and 27.2% were non-families. 23.5% of all households were made up of individuals, and 11.1% had someone living alone who was 65 years of age or older. The average household size was 2.75 and the average family size was 3.36.

In the township the population was spread out, with 33.2% under the age of 18, 8.1% from 18 to 24, 23.3% from 25 to 44, 19.3% from 45 to 64, and 16.1% who were 65 years of age or older. The median age was 34 years. For every 100 females, there were 114.4 males. For every 100 females age 18 and over, there were 109.9 males.

The median income for a household in the township was $43,125, and the median income for a family was $47,813. Males had a median income of $31,250 versus $18,125 for females. The per capita income for the township was $13,896. About 12.7% of families and 12.3% of the population were below the poverty line, including 12.5% of those under the age of eighteen and 32.5% of those 65 or over.
