= Similosodus burckhardti =

Scientific classification
- Kingdom: Animalia
- Phylum: Arthropoda
- Class: Insecta
- Order: Coleoptera
- Suborder: Polyphaga
- Infraorder: Cucujiformia
- Family: Cerambycidae
- Genus: Similosodus
- Species: S. burckhardti

Binomial name
- Similosodus burckhardti Hüdepohl, 1996

Synonyms
- Similosodus (Transversesodus) burckhardti Hüdepohl, 1996

Species of beetle

Similosodus burckhardti is a species of beetle in the family Cerambycidae. It was described by Karl-Ernst Hüdepohl in 1996. It is known from Borneo.
