= Similosodus fuscosignatus =

Scientific classification
- Kingdom: Animalia
- Phylum: Arthropoda
- Clade: Pancrustacea
- Class: Insecta
- Order: Coleoptera
- Suborder: Polyphaga
- Infraorder: Cucujiformia
- Family: Cerambycidae
- Genus: Similosodus
- Species: S. fuscosignatus

Binomial name
- Similosodus fuscosignatus (Breuning, 1939)

Synonyms
- Sodus fuscosignatus Breuning, 1939

Species of beetle

Similosodus fuscosignatus is a species of beetle in the family Cerambycidae. It was described by Stephan von Breuning in 1939, originally under the genus Sodus. It is known from Java, Borneo, and Malaysia.
