= Lynd Township, Lyon County, Minnesota =

Lynd Township, Minnesota
- Township
- Location within the state of Minnesota Lynd Township, Minnesota (the United States)
- Coordinates: 44°24′12″N 95°53′14″W
- Country: United States
- State: Minnesota
- County: Lyon

Area
  - Total: 35.9 sq mi (93.0 km^{2})
  - Land: 35.9 sq mi (92.9 km^{2})
  - Water: 0.039 sq mi (0.1 km^{2})
- Elevation: 1,319 ft (402 m)

Population (2000)
  - Total: 471
  - Density: 13/sq mi (5.1/km^{2})
- Time zone: UTC-6 (Central (CST))
  - Summer (DST): UTC-5 (CDT)
- ZIP code: 56157
- Area code: 507
- FIPS code: 27-38726
- GNIS feature ID: 0664846

Lynd Township is a township in Lyon County, Minnesota, United States. The population was 471 at the 2000 census.

== History ==
Lynd Township was organized in 1873, and named for James W. Lynd, a state senator who was killed in the Dakota War of 1862.

== Geography ==
According to the United States Census Bureau, the township has a total area of 35.9 square miles (93.0 km^{2}), of which 35.9 square miles (92.9 km^{2}) is land and 0.04 square mile (0.1 km^{2}) (0.11%) is water.

== Demographics ==
As of the census of 2000, there were 471 people, 155 households, and 135 families residing in the township. The population density was 13.1 inhabitants per square mile (5.1/km^{2}). There were 163 housing units at an average density of 4.5 per square mile (1.7/km^{2}). The racial makeup of the township was 98.51% White, 0.21% Asian, and 1.27% from two or more races. Hispanic or Latino of any race were 0.85% of the population.

There were 155 households, out of which 51.6% had children under the age of 18 living with them, 78.7% were married couples living together, 4.5% had a female householder with no husband present, and 12.3% were non-families. 8.4% of all households were made up of individuals, and 3.2% had someone living alone who was 65 years of age or older. The average household size was 3.04 and the average family size was 3.23.

In the township the population was spread out, with 29.7% under the age of 18, 8.1% from 18 to 24, 27.4% from 25 to 44, 27.4% from 45 to 64, and 7.4% who were 65 years of age or older. The median age was 36 years. For every 100 females, there were 124.3 males. For every 100 females age 18 and over, there were 122.1 males.

The median income for a household in the township was $57,083, and the median income for a family was $63,750. Males had a median income of $34,583 versus $25,000 for females. The per capita income for the township was $21,921. None of the families and 0.8% of the population were living below the poverty line, including no under eighteens and none of those over 64.
