= Vallers Township, Lyon County, Minnesota =

Vallers Township, Minnesota
- Township
- Location within the state of Minnesota Vallers Township, Minnesota (the United States)
- Coordinates: 44°34′38″N 95°46′55″W
- Country: United States
- State: Minnesota
- County: Lyon

Area
  - Total: 36.3 sq mi (94.1 km^{2})
  - Land: 36.3 sq mi (94.1 km^{2})
  - Water: 0 sq mi (0.0 km^{2})
- Elevation: 1,106 ft (337 m)

Population (2000)
  - Total: 243
  - Density: 6.7/sq mi (2.6/km^{2})
- Time zone: UTC-6 (Central (CST))
  - Summer (DST): UTC-5 (CDT)
- FIPS code: 27-66496
- GNIS feature ID: 0665849

Vallers Township is a township in Lyon County, Minnesota, United States. The population was 243 at the 2000 census.

Vallers Township was organized in 1876. Vallers is a corruption of valla, a word derived from the Norwegian language meaning "valley".

== Geography ==
According to the United States Census Bureau, the township has a total area of 36.3 square miles (94.1 km^{2}), all land.

== Demographics ==
As of the census of 2000, there were 243 people, 83 households, and 64 families residing in the township. The population density was 6.7 people per square mile (2.6/km^{2}). There were 87 housing units at an average density of 2.4/sq mi (0.9/km^{2}). The racial makeup of the township was 100.00% White. Hispanic or Latino of any race were 0.41% of the population.

There were 83 households, out of which 47.0% had children under the age of 18 living with them, 71.1% were married couples living together, 3.6% had a female householder with no husband present, and 21.7% were non-families. 18.1% of all households were made up of individuals, and 4.8% had someone living alone who was 65 years of age or older. The average household size was 2.93 and the average family size was 3.37.

In the township the population was spread out, with 30.9% under the age of 18, 11.1% from 18 to 24, 24.3% from 25 to 44, 27.2% from 45 to 64, and 6.6% who were 65 years of age or older. The median age was 35 years. For every 100 females, there were 127.1 males. For every 100 females age 18 and over, there were 107.4 males.

The median income for a household in the township was $46,250, and the median income for a family was $51,250. Males had a median income of $32,500 versus $22,500 for females. The per capita income for the township was $17,218. About 2.9% of families and 4.0% of the population were below the poverty line, including 8.3% of those under the age of eighteen and none of those 65 or over.
