= Grand Prairie Township, Nobles County, Minnesota =

Grand Prairie Township, Minnesota
- Township
- Location within the state of Minnesota
- Coordinates: 43°33′3″N 96°0′3″W
- Country: United States
- State: Minnesota
- County: Nobles

Area
  - Total: 35.4 sq mi (91.6 km^{2})
  - Land: 35.4 sq mi (91.6 km^{2})
  - Water: 0 sq mi (0.0 km^{2})
- Elevation: 1,470 ft (448 m)

Population (2000)
  - Total: 9,925
  - Density: 6.5/sq mi (2.5/km^{2})
- Time zone: UTC-6 (Central (CST))
  - Summer (DST): UTC-5 (CDT)
- FIPS code: 27-25100
- GNIS feature ID: 0664318

Grand Prairie Township is a township in Nobles County, Minnesota, United States. The population was 9,925 at the 2000 census.

== Geography ==
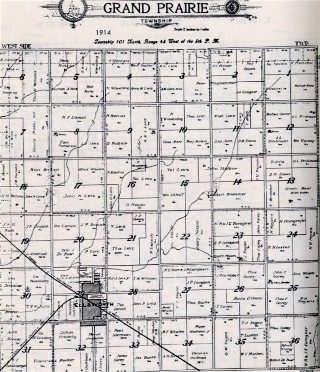
Map of Grand Prairie Township - 1914

Homestead Certificate for Grand Prairie Township signed by President Chester Arthur

According to the United States Census Bureau, the township has a total area of 35.4 square miles (92 km^{2}), all land. The main geographic features of Grand Prairie Township include the numerous branches of the Norwegian Creek that extend throughout much of the township. The main branch of the Kanaranzi Creek also flows through the northwest corner Grand Prairie Township.

Main highways include:

- Minnesota State Highway 91
- Nobles County Road 6
- Nobles County Road 8

== History ==
Organization of Grand Prairie Township was approved by the Nobles County Board on September 22, 1873, though settlers has taken up root in the township as early as 1871. The first township meeting was held on October 30, 1873. There were originally three names proposed for the new township: Colfax, Grand Prairie, and Union Township. The Nobles County Board liked Grand Prairie Township best, and that is why the name was chosen. Grand Prairie Township is in the extreme southwestern corner of Nobles County. One of the first settlers of Grand Prairie Township is known in history only as "Uncle" Stillwell. Mr Stillwell made a claim in section 29 where the town of Ellsworth now stands. He established a small store on his farmstead, supplying the needs of local farmers. He also operated a peddler's wagon in the vicinity. Mr. Stillwell had great confidence in the future of the region. However, Stillwell packed up and left the area in 1882, two years before the town of Ellsworth was established.

The picture above is a homestead certificate issued to Alphonso Hall in 1882 and signed by President Chester A Arthur. This Homestead certificate is for a 160-acre (0.65 km^{2}) parcel of land in the southwest quarter of Section 34. In December 1871, the state of Minnesota granted all odd numbered sections of land extending along the proposed right-of-way of the St. Paul & Sioux City Railway Company to that company. This was the so-called "ten-mile limit" extending for five miles (8.0 km) on either side of any rail line planned by a railroad company. Even-numbered sections had been retained by the government for homestead or for sale to actual settlers. Alphonso Hall and his family are listed on the 1880 Federal Census roster for Grand Prairie township, though not on the 1875 census.

== Demographics ==
As of the census of 2000, there were 227 people, 82 households, and 61 families residing in the township. The population density was 6.4 inhabitants per square mile (2.5/km^{2}). There were 90 housing units at an average density of 2.5 per square mile (0.97/km^{2}). The racial makeup of the township was 97.80% White, 2.20% from other races. Hispanic or Latino of any race were 2.64% of the population.

There were 82 households, out of which 34.1% had children under the age of 18 living with them, 69.5% were married couples living together, 4.9% had a female householder with no husband present, and 24.4% were non-families. 23.2% of all households were made up of individuals, and 8.5% had someone living alone who was 65 years of age or older. The average household size was 2.77 and the average family size was 3.24.

In the township the population was spread out, with 29.1% under the age of 18, 7.9% from 18 to 24, 22.9% from 25 to 44, 25.6% from 45 to 64, and 14.5% who were 65 years of age or older. The median age was 39 years. For every 100 females, there were 100.9 males. For every 100 females age 18 and over, there were 111.8 males.

The median income for a household in the township was $34,500, and the median income for a family was $45,833. Males had a median income of $14,375 versus $13,750 for females. The per capita income for the township was $16,192. About 3.3% of families and 6.8% of the population were below the poverty line, including 8.1% of those under the age of eighteen and 5.7% of those 65 or over.

== Politics ==
Grand Prairie Township is located in Minnesota's 1st congressional district, represented by Mankato educator Tim Walz, a Democrat. At the state level, Grand Prairie Township is located in Senate District 22, represented by Republican Doug Magnus, and in House District 22A, represented by Republican Joe Schomacker.

== Local politics ==
Grand Prairie Township is represented by Nobles County Commissioner Gene Metz.
