= Similosodus ursulus =

Scientific classification
- Kingdom: Animalia
- Phylum: Arthropoda
- Class: Insecta
- Order: Coleoptera
- Suborder: Polyphaga
- Infraorder: Cucujiformia
- Family: Cerambycidae
- Genus: Similosodus
- Species: S. ursulus

Binomial name
- Similosodus ursulus (Pascoe, 1866)

Synonyms
- Sodus ursulus Pascoe, 1866

Species of beetle

Similosodus ursulus is a species of beetle in the family Cerambycidae. It was described by Francis Polkinghorne Pascoe in 1866, originally under the genus Sodus. It is known from Malaysia.
