= Similosodus flavicornis =

Scientific classification
- Kingdom: Animalia
- Phylum: Arthropoda
- Class: Insecta
- Order: Coleoptera
- Suborder: Polyphaga
- Infraorder: Cucujiformia
- Family: Cerambycidae
- Genus: Similosodus
- Species: S. flavicornis

Binomial name
- Similosodus flavicornis Breuning, 1961

Species of beetle

Similosodus flavicornis is a species of beetle in the family Cerambycidae. It was described by Stephan von Breuning in 1961. It is known from Malaysia, Borneo and Sumatra.
