= Amiret, Minnesota =

- Unincorporated community
- Location within Minnesota Location within the United States
- Coordinates: 44°19′00″N 95°41′49″W
- Country: United States
- State: Minnesota
- County: Lyon
- Township: Amiret
- Elevation: 1,273 ft (388 m)
- Time zone: UTC-6 (Central (CST))
  - Summer (DST): UTC-5 (CDT)
- Area code: 507
- GNIS feature ID: 639330

Amiret is an unincorporated community in Lyon County, in the U.S. state of Minnesota.

== History ==
Amiret was originally called Saratoga, after Saratoga, New York, and under the latter name was platted in 1874. The present name, adopted in 1879, is for Amiretta Sykes, the wife of a railroad official.

The town's post office first opened under the name Coburg in 1873. The name of the post office was changed to Amiret in 1878, and remained in operation until 1992.

Historical population
Census	Pop.	Note	%±
1880	46		—
U.S. Decennial Census
