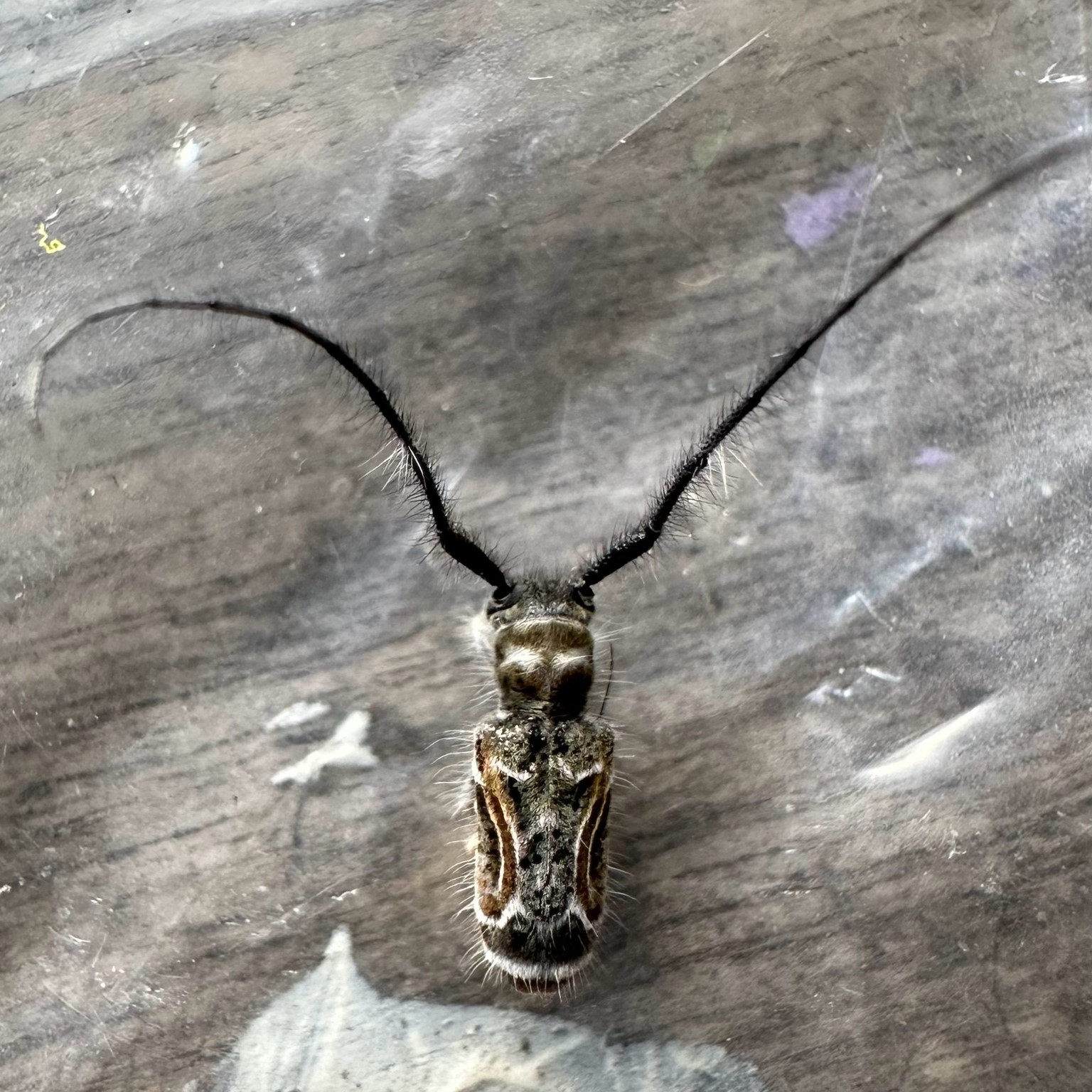

Scientific classification
- Kingdom: Animalia
- Phylum: Arthropoda
- Class: Insecta
- Order: Coleoptera
- Suborder: Polyphaga
- Infraorder: Cucujiformia
- Family: Cerambycidae
- Genus: Similosodus
- Species: S. venosus

Binomial name
- Similosodus venosus (Pascoe, 1867)

Synonyms
- Sodus venosus Pascoe, 1867; Enispia bella Gahan, 1893; Similosodus (Venosodus) venosus (Pascoe, 1867); Similisodus venosus Pascoe, 1867

= Similosodus venosus =

Species of beetle

Similosodus venosus is a species of beetle in the family Cerambycidae. It was first described by Francis Polkinghorne Pascoe in 1867, originally under the genus Sodus. It is known from Australia.
