= Similosodus transversefasciatus =

Scientific classification
- Kingdom: Animalia
- Phylum: Arthropoda
- Class: Insecta
- Order: Coleoptera
- Suborder: Polyphaga
- Infraorder: Cucujiformia
- Family: Cerambycidae
- Genus: Similosodus
- Species: S. transversefasciatus

Binomial name
- Similosodus transversefasciatus (Breuning, 1938)

Synonyms
- Sodus transversefasciatus Breuning, 1938; Similosodus (Transversesodus) transversefasciatus (Breuning, 1938)

Species of beetle

Similosodus transversefasciatus is a species of beetle in the family Cerambycidae. It was described by Stephan von Breuning in 1938, originally under the genus Sodus.
