= Westerheim Township, Lyon County, Minnesota =

Westerheim Township, Minnesota
- Township
- Location within the state of Minnesota Westerheim Township, Minnesota (the United States)
- Coordinates: 44°35′26″N 95°54′1″W
- Country: United States
- State: Minnesota
- County: Lyon

Area
  - Total: 36.3 sq mi (94.1 km^{2})
  - Land: 36.3 sq mi (94.1 km^{2})
  - Water: 0 sq mi (0.0 km^{2})
- Elevation: 1,129 ft (344 m)

Population (2000)
  - Total: 286
  - Density: 7.8/sq mi (3/km^{2})
- Time zone: UTC-6 (Central (CST))
  - Summer (DST): UTC-5 (CDT)
- FIPS code: 27-69412
- GNIS feature ID: 0665961

Westerheim Township is a township in Lyon County, Minnesota, United States. The population was 286 at the 2000 census.

== History ==
Westerheim Township was organized in 1876, and derives its name from a Norwegian-language word meaning "western home".

== Geography ==
According to the United States Census Bureau, the township has a total area of 36.3 square miles (94.1 km^{2}), of which 36.3 square miles (94.1 km^{2}) is land and 0.03% is water.

== Demographics ==
As of the census of 2000, there were 286 people, 97 households, and 78 families residing in the township. The population density was 7.9 people per square mile (3.0/km^{2}). There were 100 housing units at an average density of 2.8/sq mi (1.1/km^{2}). The racial makeup of the township was 100.00% White.

There were 97 households, out of which 43.3% had children under the age of 18 living with them, 74.2% were married couples living together, 3.1% had a female householder with no husband present, and 18.6% were non-families. 17.5% of all households were made up of individuals, and 5.2% had someone living alone who was 65 years of age or older. The average household size was 2.95 and the average family size was 3.35.

In the township the population was spread out, with 31.5% under the age of 18, 6.6% from 18 to 24, 28.3% from 25 to 44, 25.2% from 45 to 64, and 8.4% who were 65 years of age or older. The median age was 35 years. For every 100 females, there were 116.7 males. For every 100 females age 18 and over, there were 122.7 males.

The median income for a household in the township was $48,393, and the median income for a family was $50,156. Males had a median income of $30,156 versus $19,063 for females. The per capita income for the township was $15,288. About 3.7% of families and 9.0% of the population were below the poverty line, including 12.4% of those under the age of eighteen and none of those 65 or over.
