= Similosodus birmanicus =

Scientific classification
- Kingdom: Animalia
- Phylum: Arthropoda
- Class: Insecta
- Order: Coleoptera
- Suborder: Polyphaga
- Infraorder: Cucujiformia
- Family: Cerambycidae
- Genus: Similosodus
- Species: S. birmanicus

Binomial name
- Similosodus birmanicus (Breuning, 1938)

Synonyms
- Sodus birmanicus Breuning, 1938

Species of beetle

Similosodus birmanicus is a species of beetle in the family Cerambycidae. It was described by Stephan von Breuning in 1938, originally under the genus Sodus.
