= Custer Township, Lyon County, Minnesota =

Custer Township, Minnesota
- Township
- Location within the state of Minnesota Custer Township, Minnesota (the United States)
- Coordinates: 44°13′58″N 95°46′49″W
- Country: United States
- State: Minnesota
- County: Lyon

Area
  - Total: 35.9 sq mi (93.0 km^{2})
  - Land: 35.4 sq mi (91.8 km^{2})
  - Water: 0.46 sq mi (1.2 km^{2})
- Elevation: 1,490 ft (454 m)

Population (2000)
  - Total: 220
  - Density: 6.2/sq mi (2.4/km^{2})
- Time zone: UTC-6 (Central (CST))
  - Summer (DST): UTC-5 (CDT)
- FIPS code: 27-14392
- GNIS feature ID: 0663909

Custer Township is a township in Lyon County, Minnesota, United States. The population was 220 at the 2000 census.

Custer Township was organized in 1876, and named for George Armstrong Custer (1839–1876), a Civil War general and Indian fighter.

== Geography ==
According to the United States Census Bureau, the township has a total area of 35.9 square miles (93 km^{2}), of which 35.5 square miles (92 km^{2}) is land and 0.4 square miles (1.0 km^{2}) (1.23%) is water.

== Demographics ==
At the 2000 census, there were 220 people, 88 households and 68 families residing in the township. The population density was 6.2 per square mile (2.4/km^{2}). There were 92 housing units at an average density of 2.6/sq mi (1.0/km^{2}). The racial makeup of the township was 99.09% White, 0.45% Native American and 0.45% Asian. Hispanic or Latino of any race were 0.45% of the population.

There were 88 households, of which 29.5% had children under the age of 18 living with them, 75.0% were married couples living together, 1.1% had a female householder with no husband present, and 22.7% were non-families. 18.2% of all households were made up of individuals, and 6.8% had someone living alone who was 65 years of age or older. The average household size was 2.50 and the average family size was 2.78.

22.3% of the population were under the age of 18, 5.0% from 18 to 24, 27.7% from 25 to 44, 30.9% from 45 to 64, and 14.1% who were 65 years of age or older. The median age was 43 years. For every 100 females, there were 103.7 males. For every 100 females age 18 and over, there were 108.5 males.

The median household income was $41,250 and the median family income was $48,750. Males had a median income of $25,781 and females $25,833. The per capita income for the township was $19,334. About 9.7% of families and 11.1% of the population were below the poverty line, including 11.1% of those under the age of eighteen and 15.4% of those 65 or over.
