= Similosodus signatus =

Scientific classification
- Kingdom: Animalia
- Phylum: Arthropoda
- Class: Insecta
- Order: Coleoptera
- Suborder: Polyphaga
- Infraorder: Cucujiformia
- Family: Cerambycidae
- Genus: Similosodus
- Species: S. signatus

Binomial name
- Similosodus signatus (Breuning, 1939)

Synonyms
- Similosodus (Transversesodus) signatus (Breuning, 1939)

Species of beetle

Similosodus signatus is a species of beetle in the family Cerambycidae. It was described by Stephan von Breuning in 1939.
