= Sodus Township =

Sodus Township may refer to:

- Sodus Township, Michigan
- Sodus Township, Lyon County, Minnesota
