= Similosodus strandi =

Scientific classification
- Kingdom: Animalia
- Phylum: Arthropoda
- Class: Insecta
- Order: Coleoptera
- Suborder: Polyphaga
- Infraorder: Cucujiformia
- Family: Cerambycidae
- Genus: Similosodus
- Species: S. strandi

Binomial name
- Similosodus strandi (Breuning, 1938)

Synonyms
- Similosodus (Transversesodus) strandi (Breuning, 1938)

Species of beetle

Similosodus strandi is a species of beetle in the family Cerambycidae. It was described by Stephan von Breuning in 1938.
