= Curt Brasket =

American chess player (1932–2014)

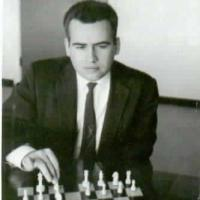

Personal information
- Born: Curt Justin Brasket; December 7, 1932 Tracy, Minnesota, US
- Died: January 24, 2014 (aged 81) Minneapolis, Minnesota, US

Chess career
- Country: United States
- Title: FIDE Master (1983)
- Peak rating: 2375 (January 1978)

Curt Justin Brasket (December 7, 1932 – January 24, 2014) was an American chess player and US National Junior Chess Champion. He was also a sixteen-time state champion for his home state of Minnesota, and a FIDE Master. In 2013 he was granted the Outstanding Career Achievement Award by the US Chess Federation.

== Biography ==
Brasket was born in Tracy, Minnesota in December 1932. The sixth of eight children, he became interested in chess at age 13 after finding a book on the game – though he had at the time been looking for a book on checkers. He attended the University of Minnesota and Saint John's University, graduating with degrees in French and mathematics. Upon graduation, Brasket enlisted in the US Army and was sent to Japan for a two-year tour. He returned and was given an honorable discharge, after which he started a career as computer programmer for Unisys.

Brasket married Rita Bronk in 1963 and moved to Bloomington, Minnesota. Together they had three daughters: Monica (Charles Wedin), Barbara (Daniel Romanelli), and Rebecca (Joseph Leahy). In the late 1970s he was diagnosed with Parkinson's disease.

=== Chess career ===
In 1952 at age 20, Brasket entered and won the US Junior Chess Championship held in Omaha. During the 1970s he competed in a number of Lone Pine International tournaments, occasionally defeating grandmasters such as Walter Browne, Arnold Denker and Larry Evans. His peak FIDE rating was 2375 in January 1978, and in 1983 he was awarded the FIDE Master title.

Between 1991 and his final tournament in 2011, Brasket competed in 583 tournaments. He won the Minnesota State Championship a record 16 times, and in 2013 he received the US Chess Federation Outstanding Career Achievement Award.

=== Death ===
After three years in a VA Home in Minneapolis, Brasket died in his sleep on January 24, 2014, after just celebrating his 50th wedding anniversary. Four of his siblings had previously died, and he was survived by his wife. He was described by Sean Nagle, the incumbent Minnesota State Champion at the time of his death, as "a truly towering figure in Minnesota chess".

== Notable games ==
Position: a8 black rook, d8 black queen, e8 black knight, f8 black rook, g8 black king, a7 black pawn, c7 black pawn, d7 black pawn, f7 black pawn, g7 black pawn, b6 black pawn, e6 black pawn, a5 black knight, e5 white pawn, g5 white knight, h5 white queen, d4 white pawn, f4 white pawn, a3 white pawn, c3 white pawn, d3 black bishop, g2 white pawn, h2 white pawn, a1 white rook, c1 white bishop, e1 white king, h1 white rook

Position before 15.f5

Brasket vs. GM Arthur Bisguier, Puerto Rico 1968
1.d4 Nf6 2.c4 e6 3.Nc3 Bb4 4.a3 Bxc3+ 5.bxc3 0-0 6.f3 Ne8 7.e4 b6 8.Bd3 Ba6 9.f4 Nc6 10.Nf3 Na5 11.e5 Bxc4 12.Bxh7+ Kxh7 13.Ng5+ Kg8 14.Qh5 Bd3 (diagram) 15.f5 Bxf5 16.0-0 Bg6 17.Qh4 f6 18.Rf3 fxg5 19.Rxf8+ Kxf8 20.Bxg5 Qxg5 21.Qxg5 Bf7 22.Rf1 Nc6 23.Qh5 Nd8 24.g4 Kg8 25.Qh4 Nc6 26.Qf2 Nd8 27.h4 c5 28.h5 Nc7 29.Qf3 cxd4 30.cxd4 Nd5 31.g5 Rc8 32.g6 Rc3 33.gxf7+ Kf8 34.Qg2 Ne3 35.Qxg7+ Kxg7 36.f8=Q+ Kh7 37.h6 Nf5 38.Rxf5 Rg3+ 39.Kf2 1–0
