= Lucas Township, Lyon County, Minnesota =

Lucas Township, Minnesota
- Township
- Location within the state of Minnesota Lucas Township, Minnesota (the United States)
- Coordinates: 44°35′47″N 95°40′43″W
- Country: United States
- State: Minnesota
- County: Lyon

Area
  - Total: 35.6 sq mi (92.3 km^{2})
  - Land: 33.8 sq mi (87.5 km^{2})
  - Water: 1.9 sq mi (4.8 km^{2})
- Elevation: 1,089 ft (332 m)

Population (2000)
  - Total: 260
  - Density: 7.8/sq mi (3/km^{2})
- Time zone: UTC-6 (Central (CST))
  - Summer (DST): UTC-5 (CDT)
- FIPS code: 27-38438
- GNIS feature ID: 0664836

Lucas Township is a township in Lyon County, Minnesota, United States. The population was 260 at the 2000 census.

Lucas Township was organized in 1873. In 1888, Edward P. Elmer was proprietor of the Cottonwood Dairy located in Lucas Township, Lyon County, Minnesota (Rose, 1912, p. 372).

== Geography ==
According to the United States Census Bureau, the township has a total area of 35.7 square miles (92.3 km^{2}), of which 33.8 square miles (87.5 km^{2}) is land and 1.9 square miles (4.8 km^{2}) (5.19%) is water. Lakes in Lucas Township include: Cottonwood Lake, Lady Slipper Lake, Lone Tree Lake, School Grove Lake, and Sham Lake (Lyon County, MN GeoMoose, 2020).

== Demographics ==
As of the census of 2000, there were 260 people, 85 households, and 70 families residing in the township. The population density was 7.7 inhabitants per square mile (3.0/km^{2}). There were 89 housing units at an average density of 2.6 per square mile (1.0/km^{2}). The racial makeup of the township was 95.00% White, 1.54% Asian, 2.69% from other races, and 0.77% from two or more races.

There were 85 households, out of which 45.9% had children under the age of 18 living with them, 81.2% were married couples living together, and 16.5% were non-families. 15.3% of all households were made up of individuals, and 3.5% had someone living alone who was 65 years of age or older. The average household size was 3.06 and the average family size was 3.42.

In the township the population was spread out, with 35.4% under the age of 18, 3.8% from 18 to 24, 29.2% from 25 to 44, 25.0% from 45 to 64, and 6.5% who were 65 years of age or older. The median age was 33 years. For every 100 females, there were 113.1 males. For every 100 females age 18 and over, there were 118.2 males.

The median income for a household in the township was $55,313, and the median income for a family was $62,917. Males had a median income of $30,000 versus $22,045 for females. The per capita income for the township was $24,564. None of the population or families were below the poverty line.
