= Similosodus atrofasciatus =

Scientific classification
- Kingdom: Animalia
- Phylum: Arthropoda
- Class: Insecta
- Order: Coleoptera
- Suborder: Polyphaga
- Infraorder: Cucujiformia
- Family: Cerambycidae
- Genus: Similosodus
- Species: S. atrofasciatus

Binomial name
- Similosodus atrofasciatus (Pic, 1934)

Synonyms
- Sodus atrofasciatus Pic, 1934

Species of beetle

Similosodus atrofasciatus is a species of beetle in the family Cerambycidae. It was described by Maurice Pic in 1934, originally under the genus Sodus.
