= Russell, Minnesota =

City in Minnesota, United States

- City
- Location of Russell, Minnesota
- Coordinates: 44°19′12″N 95°56′51″W
- Country: United States
- State: Minnesota
- County: Lyon

Government
  - Type: Mayor – Council
  - Mayor: Roger Hook

Area
  - Total: 0.97 sq mi (2.52 km^{2})
  - Land: 0.92 sq mi (2.38 km^{2})
  - Water: 0.054 sq mi (0.14 km^{2})
- Elevation: 1,519 ft (463 m)

Population (2020)
  - Total: 348
  - Density: 379.3/sq mi (146.43/km^{2})
- Time zone: UTC-6 (Central (CST))
  - Summer (DST): UTC-5 (CDT)
- ZIP code: 56169
- Area code: 507
- FIPS code: 27-56428
- GNIS feature ID: 2396455
- Website: https://russellmn.gov/

Russell is a city in Lyon County, Minnesota, United States. The population was 348 at the 2020 census.

== History ==
Russell was platted in 1888, and named for Russell Spicer, the son of the settler credited with bringing the railroad to the community. A post office has been in operation at Russell since 1889. Russell was incorporated in 1898.

== Geography ==
According to the United States Census Bureau, the city has a total area of 0.97 square miles (2.51 km^{2}), of which 0.91 square miles (2.36 km^{2}) is land and 0.06 square miles (0.16 km^{2}) is water.

The Redwood River flows through the city.

Minnesota State Highways 23 and 91 are two of the main routes in the community.

== Education ==
Russell is served by the combined Russell-Tyler-Ruthton school district, commonly known as RTR.

== Demographics ==
Historical population
Census	Pop.	Note	%±
1910	262		—
1920	375		43.1%
1930	358		−4.5%
1940	464		29.6%
1950	508		9.5%
1960	449		−11.6%
1970	398		−11.4%
1980	412		3.5%
1990	394		−4.4%
2000	371		−5.8%
2010	338		−8.9%
2020	348		3.0%
U.S. Decennial Census

=== 2010 census ===
As of the census of 2010, there were 338 people, 157 households, and 86 families residing in the city. The population density was 371.4 inhabitants per square mile (143.4/km^{2}). There were 175 housing units at an average density of 192.3 per square mile (74.2/km^{2}). The racial makeup of the city was 98.5% White, 1.2% African American, and 0.3% Native American. Hispanic or Latino of any race were 0.6% of the population.

There were 157 households, of which 27.4% had children under the age of 18 living with them, 48.4% were married couples living together, 5.1% had a female householder with no husband present, 1.3% had a male householder with no wife present, and 45.2% were non-families. 38.2% of all households were made up of individuals, and 17.9% had someone living alone who was 65 years of age or older. The average household size was 2.15 and the average family size was 2.94.

The median age in the city was 37.7 years. 24.9% of residents were under the age of 18; 4% were between the ages of 18 and 24; 29.6% were from 25 to 44; 22.4% were from 45 to 64; and 18.9% were 65 years of age or older. The gender makeup of the city was 48.5% male and 51.5% female.

=== 2000 census ===
As of the census of 2000, there were 371 people, 157 households, and 105 families residing in the city. The population density was 415.0 inhabitants per square mile (160.2/km^{2}). There were 170 housing units at an average density of 190.2 per square mile (73.4/km^{2}). The racial makeup of the city was 99.19% White, 0.27% African American, 0.54% from other races. Hispanic or Latino of any race were 3.50% of the population.

There were 157 households, out of which 33.8% had children under the age of 18 living with them, 56.1% were married couples living together, 5.7% had a female householder with no husband present, and 33.1% were non-families. 25.5% of all households were made up of individuals, and 14.0% had someone living alone who was 65 years of age or older. The average household size was 2.36 and the average family size was 2.90.

In the city, the population was spread out, with 25.1% under the age of 18, 9.2% from 18 to 24, 29.4% from 25 to 44, 16.2% from 45 to 64, and 20.2% who were 65 years of age or older. The median age was 35 years. For every 100 females, there were 103.8 males. For every 100 females age 18 and over, there were 95.8 males.

The median income for a household in the city was $32,045, and the median income for a family was $39,000. Males had a median income of $32,188 versus $21,406 for females. The per capita income for the city was $14,767. About 6.1% of families and 9.8% of the population were below the poverty line, including 5.3% of those under age 18 and 14.9% of those age 65 or over.
