= Similosodus castaneus =

Scientific classification
- Kingdom: Animalia
- Phylum: Arthropoda
- Class: Insecta
- Order: Coleoptera
- Suborder: Polyphaga
- Infraorder: Cucujiformia
- Family: Cerambycidae
- Genus: Similosodus
- Species: S. castaneus

Binomial name
- Similosodus castaneus (Aurivillius, 1911)

Synonyms
- Sodus castaneus Aurivillius, 1911

Species of beetle

Similosodus castaneus is a species of beetle in the family Cerambycidae. It was described by Per Olof Christopher Aurivillius in 1911, originally under the genus Sodus. It is known from Borneo and Malaysia.
