= School Grove Lake =

Lake in the state of Minnesota, United States

- Location within Minnesota
- Location: Yellow Medicine County, Minnesota
- Coordinates: 44°33′7″N 95°36′52″W
- Type: lake

School Grove Lake is a lake in the U.S. state of Minnesota.

School Grove Lake was named on account of it being located in school section 36.
