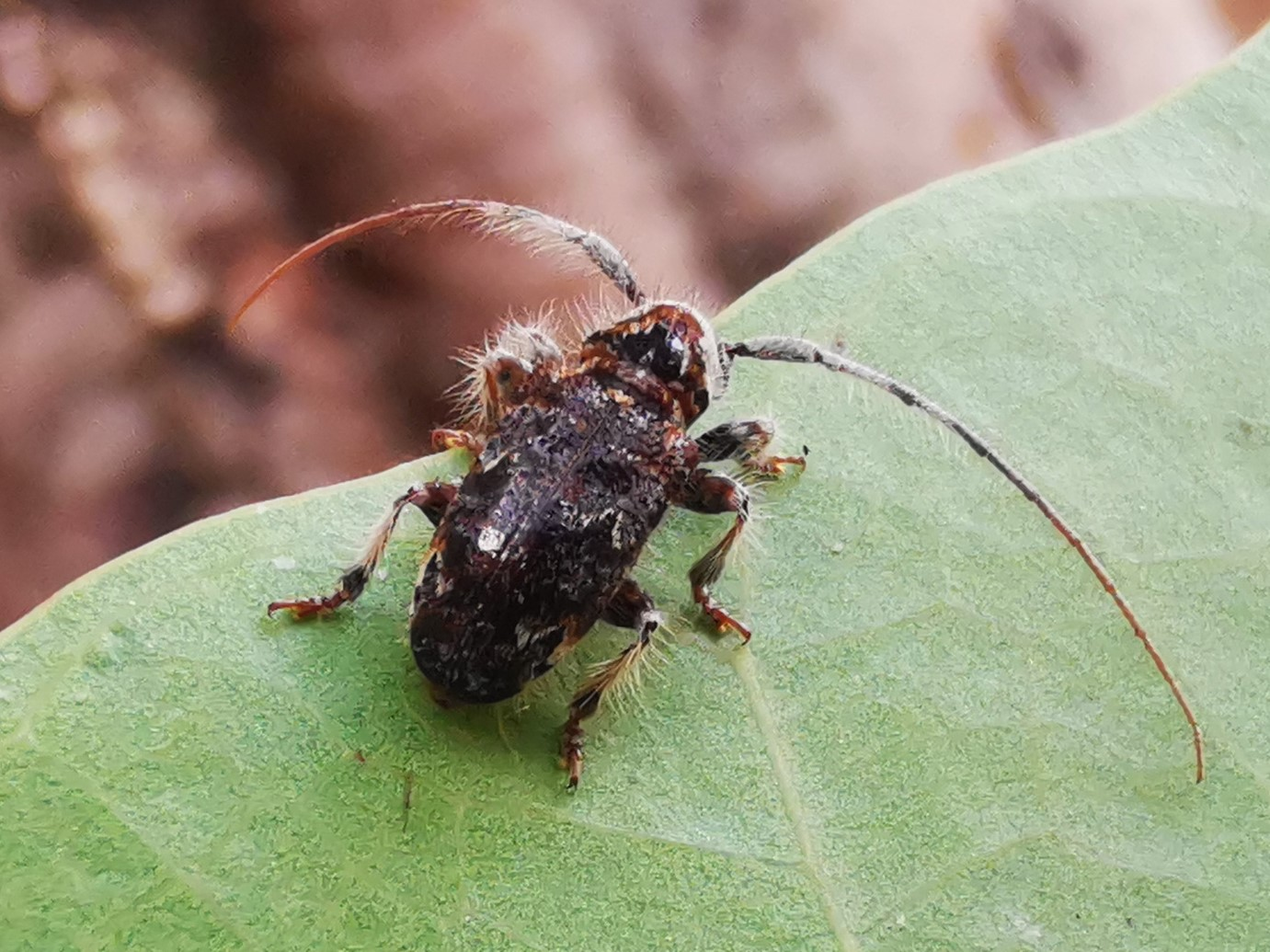
- Similosodus choumi

Scientific classification
- Kingdom: Animalia
- Phylum: Arthropoda
- Class: Insecta
- Order: Coleoptera
- Suborder: Polyphaga
- Infraorder: Cucujiformia
- Family: Cerambycidae
- Subfamily: Lamiinae
- Genus: Similosodus; McKeown, 1945

Synonyms
- Sodus Pascoe, 1865

= Similosodus =

Genus of beetles

Similosodus is a genus of longhorn beetles of the subfamily Lamiinae, containing the following species:

subgenus Similosodus

- Similosodus atrofasciatus (Pic, 1934)
- Similosodus birmanicus (Breuning, 1938)
- Similosodus castaneus (Aurivillius, 1911)
- Similosodus chinensis Gressitt 1951
- Similosodus chujoi Breuning, 1982
- Similosodus flavicornis Breuning, 1961
- Similosodus fuscosignatus (Breuning, 1939)
- Similosodus papuanus (Breuning, 1940)
- Similosodus punctiscapus Breuning, 1963
- Similosodus taiwanus Hayashi, 1966
- Similosodus torui Holzschuh, 1989
- Similosodus unifasciatus (Pic, 1934)
- Similosodus ursuloides Breuning, 1968
- Similosodus ursulus (Pascoe, 1866)
- Similosodus verticalis (Pascoe, 1865)

subgenus Transverseosodus

- Similosodus bedoci (Pic, 1926)
- Similosodus burckhardti Hüdepohl, 1996
- Similosodus choumi Breuning, 1963
- Similosodus coomani (Pic, 1926)
- Similosodus palavanicus (Breuning, 1939)
- Similosodus persimilis (Breuning, 1942)
- Similosodus samaranus (Heller, 1926)
- Similosodus signatus (Breuning, 1939)
- Similosodus strandi (Breuning, 1938)
- Similosodus transversefasciatus (Breuning, 1938)

subgenus Venosodus

- Similosodus variolosus (Breuning, 1938)
- Similosodus venosus (Pascoe, 1867)
