= Fairview Township, Lyon County, Minnesota =

Fairview Township, Minnesota
- Township
- Location within the state of Minnesota Fairview Township, Minnesota (the United States)
- Coordinates: 44°30′2″N 95°46′2″W
- Country: United States
- State: Minnesota
- County: Lyon

Area
  - Total: 33.2 sq mi (86.0 km^{2})
  - Land: 33.2 sq mi (86.0 km^{2})
  - Water: 0 sq mi (0.0 km^{2})
- Elevation: 1,125 ft (343 m)

Population (2000)
  - Total: 485
  - Density: 15/sq mi (5.6/km^{2})
- Time zone: UTC-6 (Central (CST))
  - Summer (DST): UTC-5 (CDT)
- FIPS code: 27-20384
- GNIS feature ID: 0664136

Fairview Township is a township in Lyon County, Minnesota, United States. The population was 485 at the 2000 census.

== History ==
Fairview Township was organized in 1873, and named for the scenic landscapes of the township.

== Geography ==
According to the United States Census Bureau, the township has a total area of 33.2 square miles (86 km^{2}), all land.

== Demographics ==
As of the census of 2000, there were 485 people, 159 households, and 131 families residing in the township. The population density was 14.6 inhabitants per square mile (5.6/km^{2}). There were 162 housing units at an average density of 4.9 per square mile (1.9/km^{2}). The racial makeup of the township was 99.59% White and 0.41% Asian. Hispanic or Latino of any race were 0.41% of the population.

There were 159 households, out of which 48.4% had children under the age of 18 living with them, 77.4% were married couples living together, 2.5% had a female householder with no husband present, and 17.6% were non-families. 15.1% of all households were made up of individuals, and 5.7% had someone living alone who was 65 years of age or older. The average household size was 3.05 and the average family size was 3.39.

In the township the population was spread out, with 32.2% under the age of 18, 8.2% from 18 to 24, 29.1% from 25 to 44, 22.1% from 45 to 64, and 8.5% who were 65 years of age or older. The median age was 35 years. For every 100 females, there were 103.8 males. For every 100 females age 18 and over, there were 105.6 males.

The median income for a household in the township was $48,875, and the median income for a family was $51,563. Males had a median income of $36,458 versus $22,031 for females. The per capita income for the township was $21,641. None of the families and 2.2% of the population were living below the poverty line, including no under eighteens and 13.3% of those over 64.
