= Clifton Township, Randolph County, Missouri =

Inactive township in Missouri, U.S.

Coordinates: 39.4608°N 92.6597°W

Clifton Township is an inactive township in Randolph County, in the U.S. state of Missouri.

Clifton Township has the name of David Clifton, a pioneer citizen.
