= Florence, Minnesota =

City in Minnesota, United States

- City
- Location of Florence, Minnesota
- Coordinates: 44°14′14″N 96°03′07″W
- Country: United States
- State: Minnesota
- County: Lyon
- Platted: October 9, 1888
- Incorporated: February 16, 1920

Government
  - Type: Mayor – Council
  - Mayor: Susan Johnson

Area
  - Total: 0.108 sq mi (0.279 km^{2})
  - Land: 0.108 sq mi (0.279 km^{2})
  - Water: 0 sq mi (0.000 km^{2})
- Elevation: 1,732 ft (528 m)

Population (2020)
  - Total: 28
  - Estimate (2022): 26
  - Density: 260.4/sq mi (100.54/km^{2})
- Time zone: UTC−6 (Central (CST))
  - Summer (DST): UTC−5 (CDT)
- ZIP Code: 56170
- Area code: 507
- FIPS code: 27-21410
- GNIS feature ID: 2394775
- Sales tax: 6.875%

Florence is a city in Lyon County, Minnesota, United States. The population was 28 at the 2020 census.

== History ==
Florence was platted in 1888, and named for Florence Sherman, the daughter of a first settler. A post office was in operation at Florence in 1889.

== Geography ==
According to the United States Census Bureau, the city has a total area of 0.279 square miles (0.72 km^{2}), all land.

U.S. Route 14 and Minnesota State Highway 23 are two of the main routes in the community.

== Demographics ==
Historical population
| Census | Pop. | Note | %± |
|---|---|---|---|
| 1930 | 108 | | — |
| 1940 | 149 | | 38.0% |
| 1950 | 137 | | −8.1% |
| 1960 | 87 | | −36.5% |
| 1970 | 58 | | −33.3% |
| 1980 | 55 | | −5.2% |
| 1990 | 53 | | −3.6% |
| 2000 | 61 | | 15.1% |
| 2010 | 39 | | −36.1% |
| 2020 | 28 | | −28.2% |
| 2022 (est.) | 26 | | −7.1% |
U.S. Decennial Census; 2020 Census

=== 2010 census ===
As of the 2010 census, there were 39 people, 14 households, and 11 families living in the city. The population density was 144.4 inhabitants per square mile (55.8/km^{2}). There were 20 housing units at an average density of 74.1 per square mile (28.6/km^{2}). The racial makeup of the city was 74.4% White, 23.1% from other races, and 2.6% from two or more races. Hispanic or Latino of any race were 23.1% of the population.

There were 14 households, of which 35.7% had children under the age of 18 living with them, 71.4% were married couples living together, 7.1% had a female householder with no husband present, and 21.4% were non-families. 21.4% of all households were made up of individuals. The average household size was 2.79 and the average family size was 3.27.

The median age in the city was 39.3 years. 30.8% of residents were under the age of 18; 7.8% were between the ages of 18 and 24; 20.5% were from 25 to 44; 36% were from 45 to 64; and 5.1% were 65 years of age or older. The gender makeup of the city was 46.2% male and 53.8% female.

=== 2000 census ===
As of the 2000 census, there were 61 people, 21 households, and 17 families living in the city. The population density was 245.5 inhabitants per square mile (94.8/km^{2}). There were 27 housing units at an average density of 108.6 per square mile (41.9/km^{2}). The racial makeup of the city was 86.89% White, 13.11% from other races. Hispanic or Latino of any race were 13.11% of the population.

There were 21 households, out of which 42.9% had children under the age of 18 living with them, 71.4% were married couples living together, 4.8% had a female householder with no husband present, and 19.0% were non-families. 14.3% of all households were made up of individuals, and 4.8% had someone living alone who was 65 years of age or older. The average household size was 2.90 and the average family size was 3.24.

In the city, the population was spread out, with 34.4% under the age of 18, 6.6% from 18 to 24, 29.5% from 25 to 44, 23.0% from 45 to 64, and 6.6% who were 65 years of age or older. The median age was 30 years. For every 100 females, there were 96.8 males. For every 100 females age 18 and over, there were 122.2 males.

The median income for a household in the city was $43,125, and the median income for a family was $58,125. Males had a median income of $13,750 versus $31,250 for females. The per capita income for the city was $16,312. None of the population and none of the families were below the poverty line.
