= Tracy, Minnesota =

City in Minnesota, United States

- Motto: "Come Along for the Ride"
- Location of Tracy, Minnesota
- Coordinates: 44°14′20″N 95°36′55″W
- Country: United States
- State: Minnesota
- County: Lyon

Government
  - Type: Mayor – Council
  - Mayor: Pamela Cooreman https://tracymn.org/mayor-council

Area
  - Total: 2.44 sq mi (6.33 km^{2})
  - Land: 2.39 sq mi (6.20 km^{2})
  - Water: 0.046 sq mi (0.12 km^{2})
- Elevation: 1,375 ft (419 m)

Population (2020)
  - Total: 2,076
  - Density: 866.5/sq mi (334.57/km^{2})
- Time zone: UTC-6 (Central (CST))
  - Summer (DST): UTC-5 (CDT)
- ZIP code: 56175
- Area code: 507
- FIPS code: 27-65308
- GNIS feature ID: 2397044
- Website: tracymn.gov

Tracy is a city in Lyon County, Minnesota, United States. The population was 2,076 based on the 2020 census.

U.S. Route 14 serves as a main arterial route in the community.

== History ==
Tracy was platted in 1875. It was named for John F. Tracy, a railroad official. A post office called Tracy has been in operation since 1877. The city was incorporated in 1893.

On June 13, 1968, Tracy was hit by an F5 tornado, killing nine people and injuring 150. Until the 1960s, Tracy was a highly active railroad town on the Chicago & Northwestern Railway as a concentration point for numerous branch lines in the area serving heavy agriculture. Today, Tracy holds an annual late summer festival called "Boxcar Days," which takes place Labor Day weekend as a sign of the railroad's influence on the town. Tracy is a division point on the Canadian Pacific Railway (formerly the Dakota, Minnesota and Eastern Railroad), where railroad crews from both east and west exchange trains.

== Geography ==
According to the United States Census Bureau, the city has a total area of 2.23 square miles (5.78 km^{2}), of which 2.18 square miles (5.65 km^{2}) is land and 0.05 square miles (0.13 km^{2}) is water.

=== Climate ===
Climate data for Tracy, Minnesota (1991−2020 normals, extremes 1912−present)
Month	Jan	Feb	Mar	Apr	May	Jun	Jul	Aug	Sep	Oct	Nov	Dec	Year
Record high °F (°C)	65 (18)	65 (18)	83 (28)	94 (34)	107 (42)	105 (41)	108 (42)	105 (41)	105 (41)	93 (34)	79 (26)	69 (21)	108 (42)
Mean maximum °F (°C)	43.5 (6.4)	49.2 (9.6)	65.0 (18.3)	79.0 (26.1)	88.9 (31.6)	93.6 (34.2)	93.2 (34.0)	91.5 (33.1)	88.1 (31.2)	81.8 (27.7)	63.7 (17.6)	47.5 (8.6)	96.1 (35.6)
Mean daily maximum °F (°C)	22.8 (−5.1)	27.3 (−2.6)	39.0 (3.9)	54.4 (12.4)	68.1 (20.1)	78.9 (26.1)	82.2 (27.9)	79.6 (26.4)	72.9 (22.7)	58.4 (14.7)	41.4 (5.2)	27.8 (−2.3)	54.4 (12.4)
Daily mean °F (°C)	14.1 (−9.9)	18.3 (−7.6)	30.3 (−0.9)	44.0 (6.7)	57.6 (14.2)	68.4 (20.2)	71.9 (22.2)	69.3 (20.7)	61.7 (16.5)	47.6 (8.7)	32.7 (0.4)	19.8 (−6.8)	44.6 (7.0)
Mean daily minimum °F (°C)	5.3 (−14.8)	9.3 (−12.6)	21.5 (−5.8)	33.6 (0.9)	47.1 (8.4)	58.0 (14.4)	61.6 (16.4)	59.1 (15.1)	50.6 (10.3)	36.9 (2.7)	23.9 (−4.5)	11.8 (−11.2)	34.9 (1.6)
Mean minimum °F (°C)	−15.8 (−26.6)	−11.0 (−23.9)	−0.9 (−18.3)	18.4 (−7.6)	32.5 (0.3)	46.2 (7.9)	51.3 (10.7)	48.0 (8.9)	34.3 (1.3)	20.5 (−6.4)	5.5 (−14.7)	−9.8 (−23.2)	−19.0 (−28.3)
Record low °F (°C)	−33 (−36)	−30 (−34)	−22 (−30)	2 (−17)	18 (−8)	33 (1)	40 (4)	36 (2)	18 (−8)	2 (−17)	−16 (−27)	−30 (−34)	−33 (−36)
Average precipitation inches (mm)	0.64 (16)	0.74 (19)	1.44 (37)	2.86 (73)	3.96 (101)	4.48 (114)	3.54 (90)	3.43 (87)	3.80 (97)	2.26 (57)	1.32 (34)	0.74 (19)	29.21 (742)
Average snowfall inches (cm)	8.4 (21)	8.4 (21)	8.5 (22)	6.1 (15)	0.4 (1.0)	0.0 (0.0)	0.0 (0.0)	0.0 (0.0)	0.0 (0.0)	1.0 (2.5)	5.9 (15)	10.6 (27)	49.3 (125)
Average precipitation days (≥ 0.01 in)	3.8	3.9	5.3	8.9	11.7	11.9	9.2	8.8	8.2	7.1	4.4	4.2	87.4
Average snowy days (≥ 0.1 in)	3.7	3.9	2.6	1.2	0.1	0.0	0.0	0.0	0.0	0.5	2.2	4.1	18.3
Source: NOAA

== Demographics ==
Historical population
Census	Pop.	Note	%±
1880	322		—
1890	1,400		334.8%
1900	1,911		36.5%
1910	1,876		−1.8%
1920	2,463		31.3%
1930	2,570		4.3%
1940	3,085		20.0%
1950	3,020		−2.1%
1960	2,862		−5.2%
1970	2,516		−12.1%
1980	2,478		−1.5%
1990	2,059		−16.9%
2000	2,268		10.2%
2010	2,163		−4.6%
2020	2,076		−4.0%
U.S. Decennial Census

=== 2020 census ===
As of the 2020 census, Tracy had a population of 2,076. The median age was 38.7 years. 26.1% of residents were under the age of 18 and 22.2% of residents were 65 years of age or older. For every 100 females there were 98.3 males, and for every 100 females age 18 and over there were 90.6 males age 18 and over.

0.0% of residents lived in urban areas, while 100.0% lived in rural areas.

There were 844 households in Tracy, of which 28.7% had children under the age of 18 living in them. Of all households, 41.8% were married-couple households, 20.0% were households with a male householder and no spouse or partner present, and 30.1% were households with a female householder and no spouse or partner present. About 36.3% of all households were made up of individuals and 18.8% had someone living alone who was 65 years of age or older.

There were 981 housing units, of which 14.0% were vacant. The homeowner vacancy rate was 3.9% and the rental vacancy rate was 16.5%.

Racial composition as of the 2020 census
Race	Number	Percent
White	1,642	79.1%
Black or African American	3	0.1%
American Indian and Alaska Native	12	0.6%
Asian	252	12.1%
Native Hawaiian and Other Pacific Islander	0	0.0%
Some other race	57	2.7%
Two or more races	110	5.3%
Hispanic or Latino (of any race)	120	5.8%

=== 2010 census ===
As of the census of 2010, there were 2,163 people, 876 households, and 549 families living in the city. The population density was 992.2 inhabitants per square mile (383.1/km^{2}). There were 1,032 housing units at an average density of 473.4 per square mile (182.8/km^{2}). The racial makeup of the city was 86.5% White, 0.1% African American, 0.3% Native American, 9.7% Asian, 0.1% Pacific Islander, 1.5% from other races, and 1.7% from two or more races. Hispanic or Latino people of any race were 5.4% of the population.

There were 876 households, of which 30.4% had children under the age of 18 living with them, 48.5% were married couples living together, 9.9% had a female householder with no husband present, 4.2% had a male householder with no wife present, and 37.3% were non-families. 34.7% of all households were made up of individuals, and 18.3% had someone living alone who was 65 years of age or older. The average household size was 2.39 and the average family size was 3.10.

The median age in the city was 38.7 years. 26.4% of residents were under the age of 18; 7.9% were between the ages of 18 and 24; 22.5% were from 25 to 44; 23% were from 45 to 64; and 20.2% were 65 years of age or older. The gender makeup of the city was 48.2% male and 51.8% female.

=== 2000 census ===
As of the census of 2000, there were 2,268 people, 922 households, and 533 families living in the city. The population density was 1,045.2 inhabitants per square mile (403.6/km^{2}). There were 1,013 housing units at an average density of 466.8 per square mile (180.2/km^{2}). The racial makeup of the city was 87.8% White, 0.3% African American, 0.5% Native American, 8.1% Asian, 0.04% Pacific Islander, 1.7% from other races, and 1.5% from two or more races. Hispanic or Latino people of any race were 2.3% of the population.

There were 922 households, out of which 28.2% had children under the age of 18 living with them, 49.2% were married couples living together, 6.8% had a female householder with no husband present, and 42.1% were non-families. 38.5% of all households were made up of individuals, and 23.2% had someone living alone who was 65 years of age or older. The average household size was 2.35 and the average family size was 3.20.

In the city, the population was spread out, with 27.6% under the age of 18, 6.4% from 18 to 24, 21.2% from 25 to 44, 19.0% from 45 to 64, and 25.9% who were 65 years of age or older. The median age was 41 years. For every 100 females, there were 82.9 males. For every 100 females age 18 and over, there were 75.5 males.

The median income for a household in the city was $31,356, and the median income for a family was $41,108. Males had a median income of $30,221 versus $19,281 for females. The per capita income for the city was $15,574. About 6.6% of families and 13.6% of the population were below the poverty line, including 23.9% of those under age 18 and 10.4% of those age 65 or over.

== Notable people ==
- Curt Brasket, chess player
- Cal Ludeman, Minnesota state representative
- Dennis Morgan, songwriter
- Will Newton Nelson, Minnesota state representative
- Barbara Vickerman, Minnesota state representative
- Jim Vickerman, Minnesota state senator
