= Lake Marshall (Lyon County, Minnesota) =

Lake in the state of Minnesota, United States

- Location within Minnesota
- Location: Lyon County, Minnesota
- Coordinates: 44°23′18″N 95°44′12″W
- Type: lake

Lake Marshall is a lake in Lyon County, in the U.S. state of Minnesota.

Lake Marshall was named for William Rainey Marshall, 5th Governor of Minnesota.

== See also ==
- List of lakes in Minnesota
