= Cottonwood, Minnesota =

City in Minnesota, United States

- City
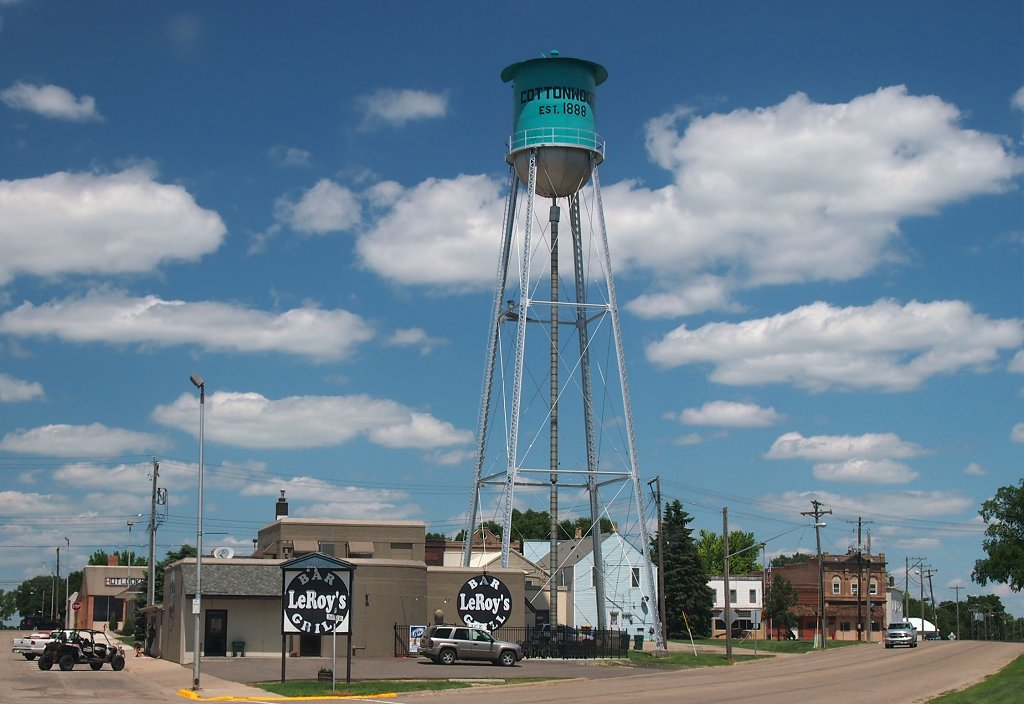
- Cottonwood from County Highway 9

- Location of Cottonwood, Minnesota
- Coordinates: 44°36′38″N 95°40′19″W
- Country: United States
- State: Minnesota
- County: Lyon

Government
  - Type: Mayor – Council
  - Mayor: Corey Moseng

Area
  - Total: 1.00 sq mi (2.58 km^{2})
  - Land: 1.00 sq mi (2.58 km^{2})
  - Water: 0 sq mi (0.00 km^{2})
- Elevation: 1,073 ft (327 m)

Population (2020)
  - Total: 1,149
  - Density: 1,153.6/sq mi (445.39/km^{2})
- Time zone: UTC-6 (Central (CST))
  - Summer (DST): UTC-5 (CDT)
- ZIP code: 56229
- Area code: 507
- FIPS code: 27-13564
- GNIS feature ID: 2393647
- Website: www.cityofcottonwoodmn.gov

Cottonwood is a city in Lyon County, Minnesota, United States. The population was 1,149 at the 2020 census.

== Geography ==
According to the United States Census Bureau, the city has an area of 1.04 square miles (2.69 km^{2}), all land. It is on the eastern shore of Cottonwood Lake.

Minnesota State Highway 23 serves as a main route in the city.

== Demographics ==
Historical population
| Census | Pop. | Note | %± |
|---|---|---|---|
| 1900 | 549 | | — |
| 1910 | 770 | | 40.3% |
| 1920 | 813 | | 5.6% |
| 1930 | 615 | | −24.4% |
| 1940 | 690 | | 12.2% |
| 1950 | 709 | | 2.8% |
| 1960 | 717 | | 1.1% |
| 1970 | 794 | | 10.7% |
| 1980 | 924 | | 16.4% |
| 1990 | 982 | | 6.3% |
| 2000 | 1,148 | | 16.9% |
| 2010 | 1,212 | | 5.6% |
| 2020 | 1,149 | | −5.2% |
U.S. Decennial Census

=== 2020 census ===
As of the 2020 census and the 2022 American Community Survey, there were 1,149 people and 492 households in the city. The population density was 1,153.5 inhabitants per square mile (445.4/km^{2}). There were 543 housing units at an average density of 522.1 per square mile (201.6/km^{2}). The racial makeup of the city was 95.8% White, 1.2% African American, 0.7% Native American, 0.3% Asian, 2.1% from other races, and 2.6% from two or more races. Hispanic or Latino of any race were 3.4% of the population.

There were 492 households, of which 28.5% had children under the age of 18 living with them, 48.2% were married couples living together, 28.7% had a female householder with no spouse present, and 13.2% had a male householder with no spouse present. 22.0% of all households had someone living alone who was 65 years of age or older. The average household size was 2.33 and the average family size was 2.98.

The median age in the city was 38.1 years. 24.6% of residents were under the age of 18; 6.9% were between the ages of 18 and 24; 25.8% were from 25 to 44; 28.7% were from 45 to 64; and 14.1% were 65 years of age or older. The gender makeup of the city was 51.0% male and 49.0% female.

=== 2010 census ===
As of the 2010 census, there were 1,212 people, 504 households, and 331 families living in the city. The population density was 1,104.8 inhabitants per square mile (426.6/km^{2}). There were 545 housing units at an average density of 524.0 per square mile (202.3/km^{2}). The racial makeup of the city was 95.8% White, 0.3% African American, 0.5% Native American, 0.1% Asian, 2.5% from other races, and 0.8% from two or more races. Hispanic or Latino of any race were 4.7% of the population.

There were 504 households, of which 31.0% had children under the age of 18 living with them, 55.2% were married couples living together, 7.3% had a female householder with no husband present, 3.2% had a male householder with no wife present, and 34.3% were non-families. 29.0% of all households were made up of individuals, and 10.7% had someone living alone who was 65 years of age or older. The average household size was 2.39 and the average family size was 2.94.

The median age in the city was 38.8 years. 25.2% of residents were under the age of 18; 7.1% were between the ages of 18 and 24; 25.7% were from 25 to 44; 27% were from 45 to 64; and 15% were 65 years of age or older. The gender makeup of the city was 49.3% male and 50.7% female.

=== 2000 census ===
As of the 2000 census, there were 1,148 people, 452 households, and 319 families living in the city. The population density was 1,339.0 inhabitants per square mile (517.0/km^{2}). There were 481 housing units at an average density of 561.0 per square mile (216.6/km^{2}). The racial makeup of the city was 96.34% White, 0.09% African American, 0.26% Native American, 0.44% Asian, 2.53% from other races, and 0.35% from two or more races. Hispanic or Latino of any race were 2.26% of the population.

There were 452 households, out of which 38.5% had children under the age of 18 living with them, 60.2% were married couples living together, 7.3% had a female householder with no husband present, and 29.4% were non-families. 26.1% of all households were made up of individuals, and 11.1% had someone living alone who was 65 years of age or older. The average household size was 2.50 and the average family size was 3.03.

In the city, the population was spread out, with 29.2% under the age of 18, 8.1% from 18 to 24, 28.9% from 25 to 44, 18.1% from 45 to 64, and 15.7% who were 65 years of age or older. The median age was 35. For every 100 females, there were 107.2 males. For every 100 females age 18 and over, there were 92.7 males.

The median income for a household in the city was $39,792, and the median income for a family was $49,375. Males had a median income of $31,298 versus $20,795 for females. The city's per capita income was $19,847. About 2.8% of families and 4.5% of the population were below the poverty line, including 4.6% of those under age 18 and 6.9% of those age 65 or over.

== Cottonwood bus crash ==
On February 19, 2008, a minivan ran through a stop sign in Cottonwood and struck a bus carrying students from Lakeview Public Schools, causing the bus to fall onto a pickup truck, killing four students and injuring 17 others. It was the deadliest school-bus related crash to occur in the state since 1997. The driver, Olga Franco del Cid, was later convicted of a total of 24 charges related to the crash and sentenced to 12 years in prison. The crash also fueled the immigration debate in the US, due to Franco del Cid's illegal immigration status.
