= Ellsworth, Minnesota =

City in Minnesota, United States

Ellsworth
- City
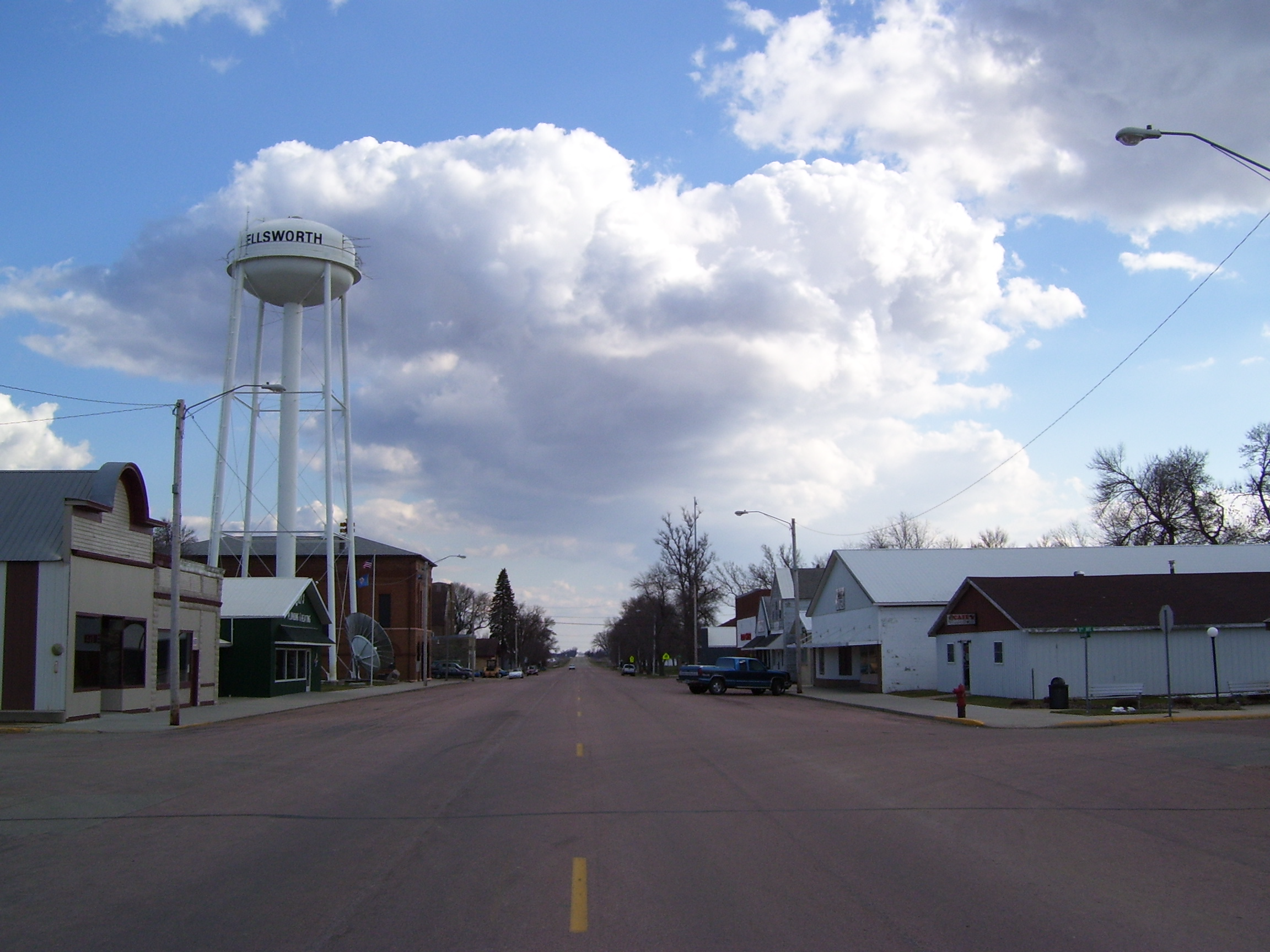
- Along Broadway Street, Ellsworth's main avenue

- Location of Ellsworth, Minnesota
- Coordinates: 43°31′14″N 96°01′07″W
- Country: United States
- State: Minnesota
- County: Nobles

Government
  - Type: Mayor - Council
  - Mayor: Colette Smythe

Area
  - Total: 0.66 sq mi (1.71 km^{2})
  - Land: 0.66 sq mi (1.71 km^{2})
  - Water: 0 sq mi (0.00 km^{2})
- Elevation: 1,450 ft (440 m)

Population (2020)
  - Total: 497
  - Density: 753.8/sq mi (291.05/km^{2})
- Time zone: UTC-6 (Central (CST))
  - Summer (DST): UTC-5 (CDT)
- ZIP code: 56129
- Area code: 507
- FIPS code: 27-18836
- GNIS feature ID: 2394667
- Website: http://www.ellsworth.mn.citygovt.org/

Ellsworth is a city in Nobles County, Minnesota, United States. The population was 497 at the 2020 census. The local school district is the Ellsworth Public School.

== Geography ==
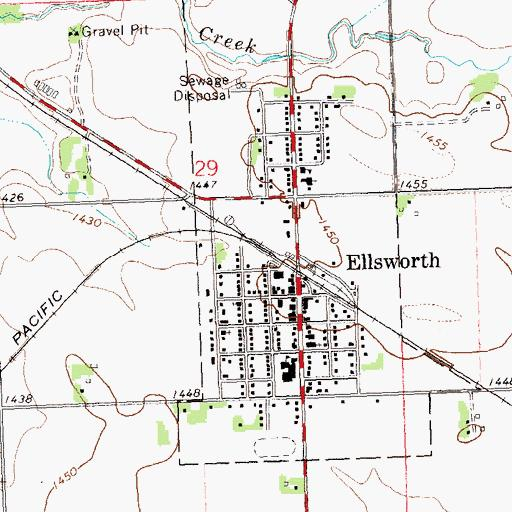
Topographic map of Ellsworth, MN

According to the United States Census Bureau, the city has a total area of 0.63 square miles (1.63 km^{2}), all land. It is located in Grand Prairie Township in the far southwestern corner of Nobles County.

Main highways include:

- Minnesota State Highway 91
- Nobles County Road 6

== History ==
Ellsworth Catholic School and Church, 1908

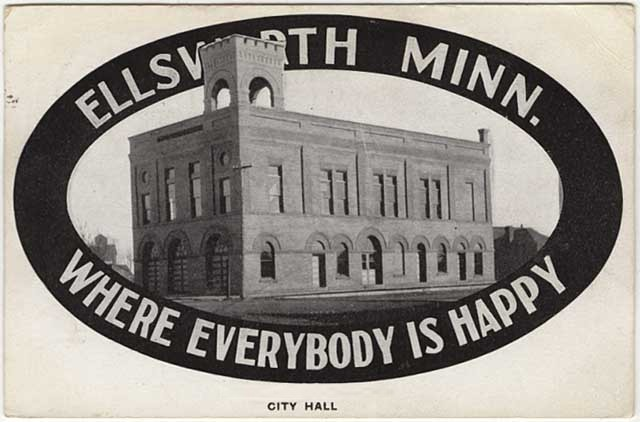
Postcard of Ellsworth Town Hall, postmarked 1910

Early history: Ellsworth is located in Grand Prairie Township in the extreme southwestern corner of Nobles County. The township was organized in 1873, though settlers had taken up residence in the township as early as 1871. One of these early settlers is known in history only as "Uncle" Stillwell. Mr Stillwell made a claim to the land where Ellsworth now stands, and he established a small store on his farmstead, supplying the needs of local farmers. He also operated a peddler's wagon in the vicinity. Mr. Stillwell had great confidence in the future of the region, and often remarked that a town would one day be located on his property, or very near to it. However, Stillwell packed up and left the area two years before the town of Ellsworth was eventually established in 1884. Ellsworth sits on Stillwell's former claim, and the business district of the town is located less than 1/2 mile west of Stillwell's cabin.

A new railroad town: The town of Ellsworth was named in honor of Eugene Ellsworth of Cedar Falls, Iowa, and came into existence as a result of construction of the Burlington Railroad in the summer of 1884. The site was selected by agents of the Cedar Rapids, Iowa & Northwestern Land & Town Lot Company. The site was surveyed by F. D. Randall, and dedication of the plat was made on September 29, 1884, by S. L. Dows and James B. Close, president and secretary, respectively, of the town lot company. When the rail line was completed, a box car was set off to the side, and this served as a depot until a more substantial structure could be built. The first structure in town was a saloon completed by Sam Stevens and Phil Lattenberger in September 1884. Construction of a dozen or more buildings were started at this same time, and before the close of the year, the booming town had about 150 inhabitants. During the winter of 1884–85, the Ellsworth postoffice was established with B. F. Garmer as postmaster.

In the early fall of 1886, the town was selected as a division point of the Burlington railroad. The company built a five-stall roundhouse, put in a turntable, erected a substantial depot, and built a branch line from Ellsworth to Rock Rapids, Iowa.

Incorporation: The necessary steps were taken to bring about incorporation at a county board meeting held in Worthington on December 10, 1886. An election was held on January 13, 1887, and municipal government began in February. The census of 1890 gave Ellsworth a population of 258. The population in 2000 was 540.

== Demographics ==
Historical population
Census	Pop.	Note	%±
1890	258		—
1900	454		76.0%
1910	536		18.1%
1920	667		24.4%
1930	644		−3.4%
1940	660		2.5%
1950	630		−4.5%
1960	634		0.6%
1970	588		−7.3%
1980	629		7.0%
1990	580		−7.8%
2000	540		−6.9%
2010	463		−14.3%
2020	497		7.3%
U.S. Decennial Census

=== 2010 census ===
As of the census of 2010, there were 463 people, 210 households, and 120 families residing in the city. The population density was 734.9 inhabitants per square mile (283.7/km^{2}). There were 233 housing units at an average density of 369.8 per square mile (142.8/km^{2}). The racial makeup of the city was 97.6% White, 0.4% African American, 0.4% Native American, 0.4% from other races, and 1.1% from two or more races. Hispanic or Latino of any race were 3.0% of the population.

There were 210 households, of which 21.0% had children under the age of 18 living with them, 48.1% were married couples living together, 7.1% had a female householder with no husband present, 1.9% had a male householder with no wife present, and 42.9% were non-families. 40.0% of all households were made up of individuals, and 19% had someone living alone who was 65 years of age or older. The average household size was 2.02 and the average family size was 2.70.

The median age in the city was 51.7 years. 17.9% of residents were under the age of 18; 6.4% were between the ages of 18 and 24; 19% were from 25 to 44; 28.6% were from 45 to 64; and 28.1% were 65 years of age or older. The gender makeup of the city was 45.6% male and 54.4% female.

=== 2000 census ===
As of the census of 2000, there were 540 people, 227 households, and 138 families residing in the city. The population density was 842.8 inhabitants per square mile (325.4/km^{2}). There were 246 housing units at an average density of 383.9 per square mile (148.2/km^{2}). The racial makeup of the city was 98.89% White, 0.19% African American, and 0.93% from two or more races.

There were 227 households, out of which 24.7% had children under the age of 18 living with them, 49.8% were married couples living together, 6.6% had a female householder with no husband present, and 39.2% were non-families. 37.9% of all households were made up of individuals, and 18.9% had someone living alone who was 65 years of age or older. The average household size was 2.19 and the average family size was 2.91.

In the city, the population was spread out, with 22.2% under the age of 18, 6.9% from 18 to 24, 22.2% from 25 to 44, 18.5% from 45 to 64, and 30.2% who were 65 years of age or older. The median age was 44 years. For every 100 females, there were 86.9 males. For every 100 females age 18 and over, there were 83.4 males.

The median income for a household in the city was $28,417, and the median income for a family was $33,438. Males had a median income of $23,875 versus $18,625 for females. The per capita income for the city was $16,098. About 4.5% of families and 6.1% of the population were below the poverty line, including 7.8% of those under age 18 and 6.7% of those age 65 or over.

== Politics ==
Ellsworth is located in Minnesota's 1st congressional district. At the state level, Ellsworth is located in Senate District 22, represented by Republican Bill Weber, and in House District 22A, represented by Republican Joe Schomacker.

== Local politics ==
The mayor of Ellsworth is Tasha Domeyer. City council members are Larry DeBeer, Glen Meester, Richard Gaul, and Spencer Swanson. Ellsworth is located in Grand Prairie Township is represented by Nobles County Commissioner Matt Widboom.
