= Nordland Township, Lyon County, Minnesota =

Nordland Township, Minnesota
- Township
- Location within the state of Minnesota Nordland Township, Minnesota (the United States)
- Coordinates: 44°30′8″N 96°0′56″W
- Country: United States
- State: Minnesota
- County: Lyon

Area
  - Total: 35.1 sq mi (90.9 km^{2})
  - Land: 35.1 sq mi (90.9 km^{2})
  - Water: 0 sq mi (0.0 km^{2})
- Elevation: 1,293 ft (394 m)

Population (2000)
  - Total: 251
  - Density: 7.3/sq mi (2.8/km^{2})
- Time zone: UTC-6 (Central (CST))
  - Summer (DST): UTC-5 (CDT)
- FIPS code: 27-46564
- GNIS feature ID: 0665135

Nordland Township is a township in Lyon County, Minnesota, United States. As of the 2000 census, the township's population was 251.

Nordland Township was organized in 1873, and named after Nordland, in Norway, the native country of a large share of the early settlers.

== Geography ==
According to the United States Census Bureau, the township has a total area of 35.1 square miles (90.9 km^{2}), all land.

== Demographics ==
As of the census of 2000, 251 people, 80 households, and 67 families resided in the township. The population density was 7.1 people per square mile (2.8/km^{2}). Housing units numbers 85, at an average density of 2.4/sq mi (0.9/km^{2}). The racial makeup of the township was 98.80% White, 1.20% from other races. Hispanic or Latino of any race were 0.40% of the population.

In 80 households, 43.8% had children under the age of 18 living with them, 76.3% were married couples living together, 2.5% had a female householder with no spouse, and 16.3% were non-families. 16.3% of all households were made up of individuals, and 6.3% had someone living alone who was at least 65 years old. The average household size was 3.14 and the average family size was 3.54.

In the township the population was spread out, with 34.7% under the age of 18, 8.8% from 18 to 24, 26.3% from 25 to 44, 22.3% from 45 to 64, and 8.0% who were 65 years of age or older. The median age was 30 years. The overall female to male ratio was100 to 130.3, while the ratio of females at least 18 years old to males was 100 to 121.6.

The median income for a household in the township was $41,071, and the median income for a family was $41,750. Males had a median income of $27,813 versus $19,722 for females. The per capita income for the township was $14,435. About 8.7% of families and 10.7% of the population were below the poverty line, including 16.9% of those under the age of 18 and none of those 65 or over.
