= Clifton Township, Wilson County, Kansas =

Township in Wilson County, Kansas, U.S.

Coordinates: 37.6914°N 95.7225°W

Clifton Township is a township in Wilson County, Kansas, United States.

== History ==
Clifton Township was named after Clifton, Bristol, England.
