= Lyon County, Minnesota =

County in Minnesota, United States

- County
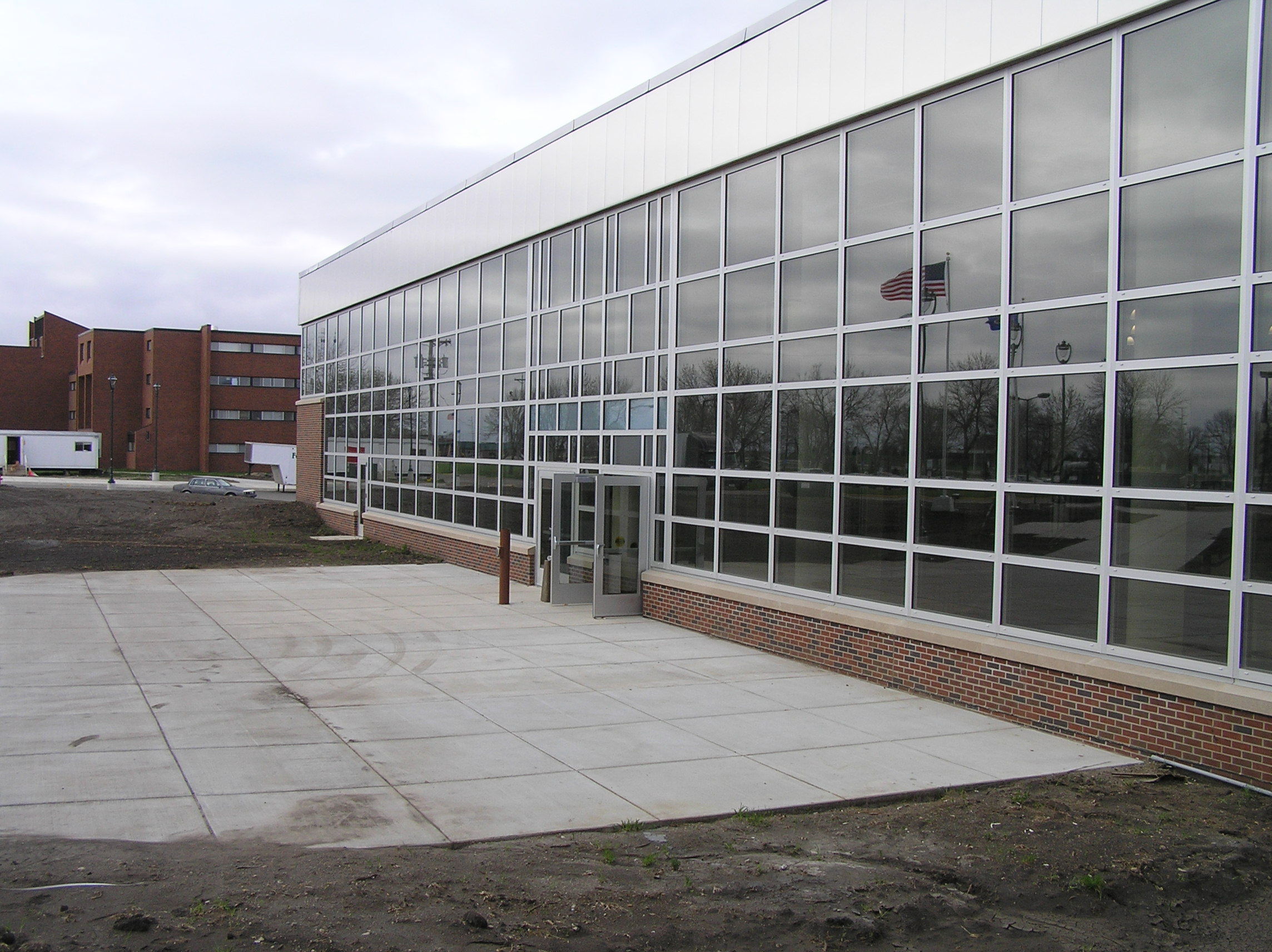
- Student Center at Southwest Minnesota State University.

- Location within the U.S. state of Minnesota
- Coordinates: 44°25′N 95°50′W
- Country: United States
- State: Minnesota
- Founded: March 6, 1868; March 2, 1869
- Named for: Nathaniel Lyon
- Seat: Marshall
- Largest city: Marshall

Area
  - Total: 722 sq mi (1,870 km^{2})
  - Land: 715 sq mi (1,850 km^{2})
  - Water: 7.1 sq mi (18 km^{2}) 1.0%

Population (2020)
  - Total: 25,269
  - Estimate (2025): 25,684 ▲
  - Density: 35.3/sq mi (13.6/km^{2})
- Time zone: UTC−6 (Central)
  - Summer (DST): UTC−5 (CDT)
- Congressional district: 7th
- Website: www.lyonco.org

Lyon County is a county in the U.S. state of Minnesota. As of the 2020 census, the population was 25,269. Its county seat is Marshall.

Lyon County comprises the Marshall Micropolitan Statistical Area.

== History ==
The county was established by two acts of the Minnesota state legislature, dated March 6, 1868, and March 2, 1869. The county seat was designated as Marshall. The county was named for Nathaniel Lyon, an Army officer who served in the Dakota and Minnesota territories before being killed in the Civil War in 1861. He had achieved the rank of general by his death. The county was much larger until an act passed on March 6, 1873, made the western 43% the new Lincoln County.

== Geography ==
The Yellow Medicine River flows northeast through the upper portion of the county, the Redwood River flows northeast through the central part, and the Cottonwood River flows northeast through the lower part. The county's terrain consists of low rolling hills, etched by drainages and gullies. It slopes to the north and east, with its highest point near its southwest corner, at 1,729 ft (527 m) ASL. The county has a total area of 722 square miles (1,870 km^{2}), of which 715 square miles (1,850 km^{2}) is land and 7.1 square miles (18 km^{2}) (1.0%) is water.

Soils of Lyon County

=== Lakes ===
- Clear Lake
- Cottonwood Lake
- East Twin Lake
- Goose Lake
- Island Lake
- Lady Slipper Lake
- Lake Marshall
- Lake of the Hill
- Lake Yankton
- Lone Tree Lake (part)
- Long Lake (part)
- McKay Lake
- North Twin Lake
- Rock Lake
- School Grove Lake (part)
- Sham Lake
- South Twin Lake
- Swift Lake
- West Twin Lake
- Wood Lake

=== Major highways ===
- U.S. Highway 14
- U.S. Highway 59
- Minnesota State Highway 19
- Minnesota State Highway 23
- Minnesota State Highway 68
- Minnesota State Highway 91

=== Airports ===
- Southwest Minnesota Regional Airport (MML)
- Tracy Municipal Airport (TKC)

=== Adjacent counties ===
- Yellow Medicine County - north
- Redwood County - east
- Murray County - south
- Pipestone County - southwest
- Lincoln County - west

=== Protected areas ===
- Camden State Park
- Gadwall State Wildlife Management Area
- Garvin State Park
- Grandview State Wildlife Management Area
- Greenhead State Wildlife Management Area
- Glynn Prairie Scientific and Natural Area
- Shelburne State Wildlife Management Area
- Vallers State Wildlife Management Area

== Demographics ==
Historical population
Census	Pop.	Note	%±
1880	6,257		—
1890	9,501		51.8%
1900	14,591		53.6%
1910	15,722		7.8%
1920	18,837		19.8%
1930	19,328		2.6%
1940	21,569		11.6%
1950	22,253		3.2%
1960	22,655		1.8%
1970	24,273		7.1%
1980	25,207		3.8%
1990	24,789		−1.7%
2000	25,425		2.6%
2010	25,857		1.7%
2020	25,269		−2.3%
2025 (est.)	25,684	▲	1.6%
U.S. Decennial Census; 1790-1960 1900-1990; 1990-2000

=== Racial and ethnic composition ===
Lyon County, Minnesota – Racial and ethnic composition Note: the US Census treats Hispanic/Latino as an ethnic category. This table excludes Latinos from the racial categories and assigns them to a separate category. Hispanics/Latinos may be of any race.
Race / Ethnicity (NH = Non-Hispanic)	Pop 1980	Pop 1990	Pop 2000	Pop 2010	Pop 2020	% 1980	% 1990	% 2000	% 2010	% 2020
White alone (NH)	24,841	24,328	23,338	22,637	20,535	98.55%	98.14%	91.79%	87.55%	81.27%
Black or African American alone (NH)	26	59	364	575	906	0.10%	0.24%	1.43%	2.22%	3.59%
Native American or Alaska Native alone (NH)	49	63	75	82	84	0.19%	0.25%	0.29%	0.32%	0.33%
Asian alone (NH)	132	121	423	677	1,263	0.52%	0.49%	1.66%	2.62%	5.00%
Native Hawaiian or Pacific Islander alone (NH)	x	x	5	6	3	x	x	0.02%	0.02%	0.01%
Other race alone (NH)	34	4	18	25	41	0.13%	0.02%	0.07%	0.10%	0.16%
Mixed race or Multiracial (NH)	x	x	193	314	693	x	x	0.76%	1.21%	2.74%
Hispanic or Latino (any race)	125	214	1,009	1,541	1,744	0.50%	0.86%	3.97%	5.96%	6.90%
Total	25,207	24,789	25,425	25,857	25,269	100.00%	100.00%	100.00%	100.00%	100.00%

=== 2020 census ===
As of the 2020 census, the county had a population of 25,269. The median age was 37.5. 25.4% of residents were under the age of 18 and 17.5% of residents were 65 years of age or older. For every 100 females there were 99.7 males, and for every 100 females age 18 and over there were 96.8 males age 18 and over.

The racial makeup of the county was 82.9% White, 3.6% Black or African American, 0.5% American Indian and Alaska Native, 5.0% Asian, <0.1% Native Hawaiian and Pacific Islander, 3.2% from some other race, and 4.7% from two or more races. Hispanic or Latino residents of any race comprised 6.9% of the population.

53.5% of residents lived in urban areas, while 46.5% lived in rural areas.

There were 10,137 households in the county, of which 29.8% had children under the age of 18 living in them. Of all households, 49.0% were married-couple households, 19.6% were households with a male householder and no spouse or partner present, and 25.2% were households with a female householder and no spouse or partner present. About 30.9% of all households were made up of individuals and 12.5% had someone living alone who was 65 years of age or older.

There were 11,180 housing units, of which 9.3% were vacant. Among occupied housing units, 66.4% were owner-occupied and 33.6% were renter-occupied. The homeowner vacancy rate was 2.0% and the rental vacancy rate was 12.5%.

=== 2000 census ===
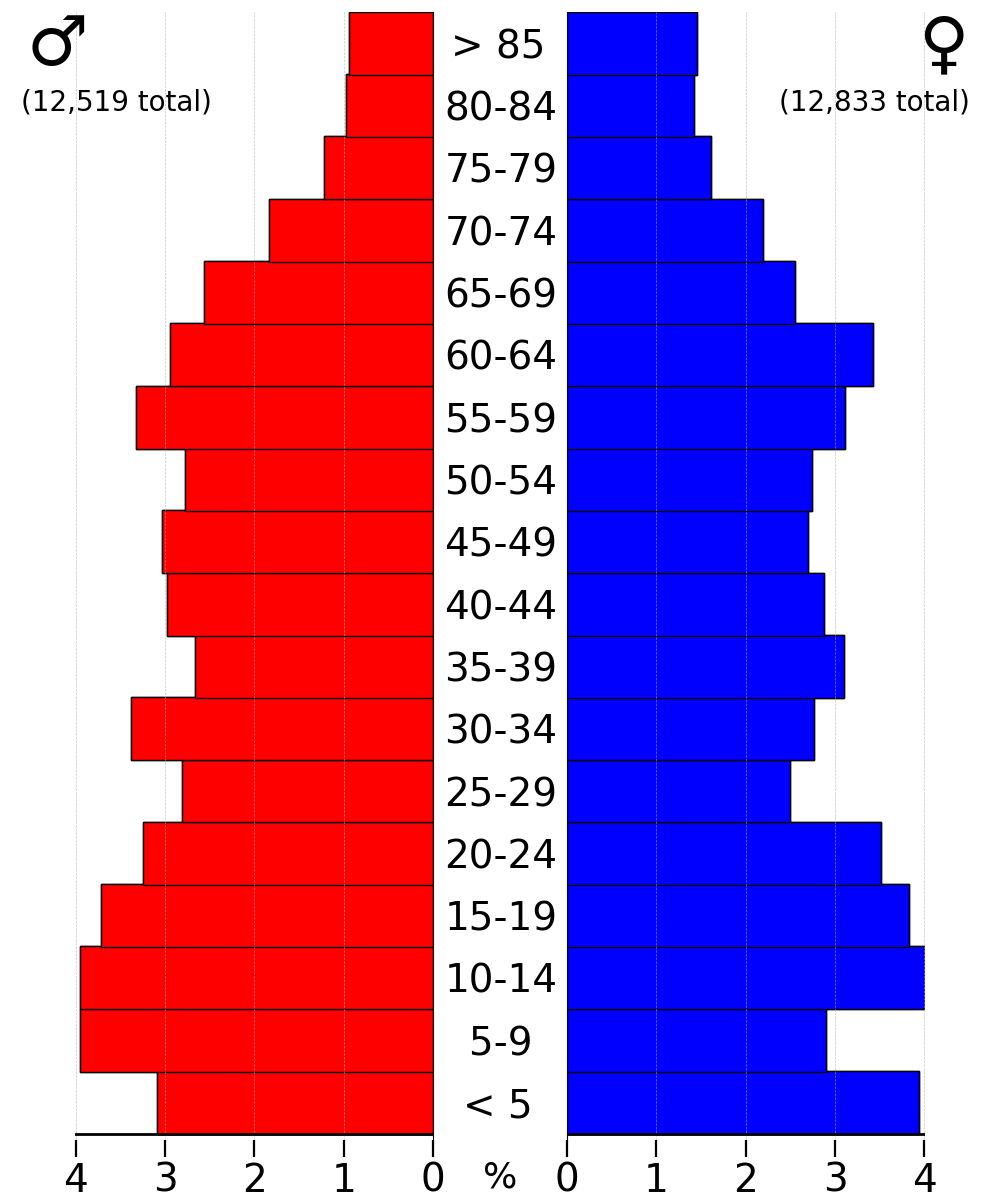
2022 US Census population pyramid for Lyon County, from ACS 5-year estimates

As of the 2000 census, there were 25,425 people, 9,715 households, and 6,334 families in the county. The population density was 35.6 per square mile (13.7/km^{2}). There were 10,298 housing units at an average density of 14.4 per square mile (5.6/km^{2}). The racial makeup of the county was 93.58% White, 1.49% Black or African American, 0.31% Native American, 1.67% Asian, 0.02% Pacific Islander, 1.89% from other races, and 1.04% from two or more races. 3.97% of the population were Hispanic or Latino of any race. 33.9% were of German, 15.5% Norwegian and 10.5% Belgian ancestry.

There were 9,715 households, of which 33.0% had children under 18 living with them, 55.1% were married couples living together, 7.1% had a female householder with no husband present, and 34.8% were non-families. 27.9% of all households were made up of individuals, and 12.4% had someone living alone who was 65 or older. The average household size was 2.49 and the average family size was 3.09.

The county population contained 26.2% under the age of 18, 13.3% from 18 to 24, 26.5% from 25 to 44, 19.5% from 45 to 64, and 14.6% who were 65 or older. The median age was 34. For every 100 females there were 95.7 males. For every 100 females 18 and older, there were 93.2 males.

The median income for a household in the county was $38,996, and the median income for a family was $48,512. Males had a median income of $32,102 versus $21,445 for females. The per capita income was $18,013. About 6.3% of families and 10.1% of the population was below the poverty line, including 10.0% of those under 18 and 12.7% of those 65 and older.

== Communities ==
=== Cities ===
- Balaton
- Cottonwood
- Florence
- Garvin
- Ghent
- Lynd
- Marshall (county seat)
- Minneota
- Russell
- Taunton
- Tracy

=== Unincorporated communities ===
- Amiret
- Burchard
- Dudley
- Green Valley

=== Townships ===
- Amiret Township
- Clifton Township
- Coon Creek Township
- Custer Township
- Eidsvold Township
- Fairview Township
- Grandview Township
- Island Lake Township
- Lake Marshall Township
- Lucas Township
- Lynd Township
- Lyons Township
- Monroe Township
- Nordland Township
- Rock Lake Township
- Shelburne Township
- Sodus Township
- Stanley Township
- Vallers Township
- Westerheim Township

== Politics ==
Lyon County is a Republican stronghold. In only one national election since 1980 has it selected the Democratic nominee (as of 2024).

United States presidential election results for Lyon County, Minnesota
Year	Republican		Democratic		Third party(ies)	
Year	No.	%	No.	%	No.	%
1892	1,068	50.88%	486	23.15%	545	25.96%
1896	1,623	52.83%	1,351	43.98%	98	3.19%
1900	1,844	64.61%	879	30.80%	131	4.59%
1904	2,394	81.82%	330	11.28%	202	6.90%
1908	1,618	56.69%	1,043	36.55%	193	6.76%
1912	460	15.65%	1,068	36.34%	1,411	48.01%
1916	1,389	38.97%	1,893	53.11%	282	7.91%
1920	4,557	73.16%	1,232	19.78%	440	7.06%
1924	3,519	53.70%	334	5.10%	2,700	41.20%
1928	4,058	54.93%	3,274	44.32%	56	0.76%
1932	2,264	30.67%	4,989	67.57%	130	1.76%
1936	2,551	30.28%	5,163	61.29%	710	8.43%
1940	4,305	44.96%	5,234	54.66%	36	0.38%
1944	3,617	43.60%	4,640	55.94%	38	0.46%
1948	3,054	32.89%	6,144	66.16%	88	0.95%
1952	6,015	59.74%	4,030	40.02%	24	0.24%
1956	5,188	55.27%	4,190	44.64%	8	0.09%
1960	4,740	46.00%	5,550	53.86%	15	0.15%
1964	3,165	32.22%	6,649	67.69%	8	0.08%
1968	4,331	43.46%	5,317	53.35%	318	3.19%
1972	5,820	50.04%	5,614	48.27%	196	1.69%
1976	5,036	40.42%	7,122	57.17%	300	2.41%
1980	5,852	45.33%	5,626	43.58%	1,433	11.10%
1984	7,170	56.64%	5,389	42.57%	100	0.79%
1988	5,969	50.86%	5,657	48.20%	110	0.94%
1992	4,591	37.25%	4,481	36.36%	3,252	26.39%
1996	4,932	42.97%	5,062	44.11%	1,483	12.92%
2000	6,087	52.98%	4,737	41.23%	665	5.79%
2004	7,203	56.84%	5,292	41.76%	178	1.40%
2008	6,315	49.69%	6,110	48.08%	283	2.23%
2012	6,594	53.23%	5,465	44.12%	329	2.66%
2016	7,256	59.40%	3,825	31.31%	1,134	9.28%
2020	7,979	61.89%	4,634	35.94%	280	2.17%
2024	8,400	64.67%	4,284	32.98%	306	2.36%

== See also ==
- National Register of Historic Places listings in Lyon County, Minnesota
