= Shelburne Township, Lyon County, Minnesota =

Shelburne Township, Minnesota
- Township
- Location within the state of Minnesota Shelburne Township, Minnesota (the United States)
- Coordinates: 44°14′16″N 96°1′39″W
- Country: United States
- State: Minnesota
- County: Lyon

Area
  - Total: 35.9 sq mi (93.1 km^{2})
  - Land: 34.9 sq mi (90.4 km^{2})
  - Water: 1.0 sq mi (2.7 km^{2})
- Elevation: 1,654 ft (504 m)

Population (2000)
  - Total: 180
  - Density: 5.2/sq mi (2/km^{2})
- Time zone: UTC-6 (Central (CST))
  - Summer (DST): UTC-5 (CDT)
- FIPS code: 27-59440
- GNIS feature ID: 0665585

Shelburne Township is a township in Lyon County, Minnesota, United States. The population was 180 at the 2000 census.

== History ==
Shelburne Township was organized in 1879.

== Geography ==
According to the United States Census Bureau, the township has a total area of 35.9 square miles (93.1 km^{2}), of which 34.9 square miles (90.4 km^{2}) is land and 1.0 square mile (2.7 km^{2}) (2.92%) is water.

== Demographics ==
As of the census of 2000, there were 180 people, 73 households, and 54 families residing in the township. The population density was 5.2 people per square mile (2.0/km^{2}). There were 84 housing units at an average density of 2.4/sq mi (0.9/km^{2}). The racial makeup of the township was 99.44% White and 0.56% Native American.

There were 73 households, out of which 30.1% had children under the age of 18 living with them, 68.5% were married couples living together, 1.4% had a female householder with no husband present, and 24.7% were non-families. 21.9% of all households were made up of individuals, and 9.6% had someone living alone who was 65 years of age or older. The average household size was 2.47 and the average family size was 2.91.

In the township the population was spread out, with 22.8% under the age of 18, 7.8% from 18 to 24, 26.7% from 25 to 44, 23.3% from 45 to 64, and 19.4% who were 65 years of age or older. The median age was 43 years. For every 100 females, there were 114.3 males. For every 100 females age 18 and over, there were 113.8 males.

The median income for a household in the township was $32,917, and the median income for a family was $39,375. Males had a median income of $25,938 versus $30,417 for females. The per capita income for the township was $16,171. About 1.9% of families and 4.3% of the population were below the poverty line, including none of those under the age of eighteen or sixty five or over.
