= Amiret Township, Lyon County, Minnesota =

Amiret Township, Minnesota
- Township
- Location within the state of Minnesota Amiret Township, Minnesota (the United States)
- Coordinates: 44°19′50″N 95°40′0″W
- Country: United States
- State: Minnesota
- County: Lyon

Area
  - Total: 36.3 sq mi (94.0 km^{2})
  - Land: 36.3 sq mi (94.0 km^{2})
  - Water: 0 sq mi (0.0 km^{2})
- Elevation: 1,207 ft (368 m)

Population (2000)
  - Total: 230
  - Density: 6.2/sq mi (2.4/km^{2})
- Time zone: UTC-6 (Central (CST))
  - Summer (DST): UTC-5 (CDT)
- ZIP code: 56175
- Area code: 507
- FIPS code: 27-01432
- GNIS feature ID: 0663429

Amiret Township is a township in Lyon County, Minnesota, United States. The population was 230 at the 2000 census.

== History ==
Historically the Native American tribe that inhabited the area were the Dakota people, specifically the Wahpekute Dakota. The Wahpekute Dakota resided primarily along the Minnesota River Valley and its tributaries, including areas within Lyon County.

The first white settlers arrived in Amiret Township in 1868, with Charles and Lafayette Grover staking their claims. James Mitchell followed suit in 1869, establishing a presence in the area. The township was officially organized on March 19, 1874, initially named "Madison Township." The name, however, proved short-lived. In 1879, it was renamed "Amiret Township" in honor of Amiretta Sykes, the wife of a prominent railroad official, M.L. Sykes.

The construction of the Chicago and Northwestern Railway (later known as the Chicago and North Western Transportation Company) through the county in 1872 played a pivotal role in Amiret Township's development. A village sprang up around the railroad station, initially called "Saratoga" (located about three miles southwest of present-day Amiret). The post office, established in 1873, was first named "Coburg" after William Coburn, a pioneer merchant and the first postmaster. The village and township continued to grow throughout the late 19th and early 20th centuries, primarily centered around agriculture.

== Geography ==
According to the United States Census Bureau, the township has a total area of 36.3 square miles (94 km^{2}), all land.

Lyon County itself falls within the Dissected Till Plains ecoregion. This region is characterized by rolling hills that were formed by glaciers during the last ice age. Melting glaciers left behind numerous lakes and wetlands dotting the landscape. The Minnesota River and its tributaries carve through the region, shaping the terrain and providing water sources.

== Demographics ==
As of the census of 2000, there were 230 people, 85 households, and 71 families residing in the township. The population density was 6.3 inhabitants per square mile (2.4/km^{2}). There were 95 housing units at an average density of 2.6 per square mile (1.0/km^{2}). The racial makeup of the township was 100.00% White.

There were 85 households, out of which 30.6% had children under the age of 18 living with them, 83.5% were married couples living together, and 15.3% were non-families. 11.8% of all households were made up of individuals, and 5.9% had someone living alone who was 65 years of age or older. The average household size was 2.71 and the average family size was 2.96.

In the township the population was spread out, with 25.2% under the age of 18, 7.0% from 18 to 24, 23.9% from 25 to 44, 30.4% from 45 to 64, and 13.5% who were 65 years of age or older. The median age was 43 years. For every 100 females, there were 96.6 males. For every 100 females age 18 and over, there were 104.8 males.

The median income for a household in the township was $49,375, and the median income for a family was $55,250. Males had a median income of $29,583 versus $21,875 for females. The per capita income for the township was $16,683. About 9.5% of families and 13.2% of the population were below the poverty line, including 19.4% of those under the age of eighteen and none of those 65 or over.
