= Clifton Township, Traverse County, Minnesota =

Township in Minnesota, United States

Clifton Township, Minnesota
- Township
- Location within the state of Minnesota Clifton Township, Minnesota (the United States)
- Coordinates: 45°48′37″N 96°18′22″W
- Country: United States
- State: Minnesota
- County: Traverse

Area
  - Total: 38.3 sq mi (99.3 km^{2})
  - Land: 38.3 sq mi (99.3 km^{2})
  - Water: 0 sq mi (0.0 km^{2})
- Elevation: 1,024 ft (312 m)

Population (2000)
  - Total: 92
  - Density: 2.3/sq mi (0.9/km^{2})
- Time zone: UTC-6 (Central (CST))
  - Summer (DST): UTC-5 (CDT)
- FIPS code: 27-11944
- GNIS feature ID: 0663823

Clifton Township is a township in Traverse County, Minnesota, United States. The population was 92 at the 2000 census.

Clifton Township was named after Clifton, Monroe County, Wisconsin.

== Geography ==
According to the United States Census Bureau, the township has a total area of 38.3 square miles (99 km^{2}), all land.

== Demographics ==
As of the census of 2000, there were 92 people, 32 households, and 28 families residing in the township. The population density was 2.4 inhabitants per square mile (0.93/km^{2}). There were 37 housing units at an average density of 1.0 per square mile (0.39/km^{2}). The racial makeup of the township was 100.00% White.

There were 32 households, out of which 40.6% had children under the age of 18 living with them, 81.3% were married couples living together, 6.3% had a female householder with no husband present, and 9.4% were non-families. 9.4% of all households were made up of individuals, and 6.3% had someone living alone who was 65 years of age or older. The average household size was 2.88 and the average family size was 2.97.

In the township the population was spread out, with 30.4% under the age of 18, 2.2% from 18 to 24, 22.8% from 25 to 44, 21.7% from 45 to 64, and 22.8% who were 65 years of age or older. The median age was 37 years. For every 100 females, there were 91.7 males. For every 100 females age 18 and over, there were 100.0 males.

The median income for a household in the township was $60,714, and the median income for a family was $60,714. Males had a median income of $30,417 versus $28,125 for females. The per capita income for the township was $14,879. There were 6.3% of families and 3.4% of the population living below the poverty line, including no under eighteens and 21.1% of those over 64.
