= Clifton Township, Lyon County, Minnesota =

Clifton Township, Minnesota
- Township
- Location within the state of Minnesota Clifton Township, Minnesota (the United States)
- Coordinates: 44°24′25″N 95°38′41″W
- Country: United States
- State: Minnesota
- County: Lyon

Area
  - Total: 36.1 sq mi (93.6 km^{2})
  - Land: 36.1 sq mi (93.4 km^{2})
  - Water: 0.077 sq mi (0.2 km^{2})
- Elevation: 1,125 ft (343 m)

Population (2000)
  - Total: 288
  - Density: 8.0/sq mi (3.1/km^{2})
- Time zone: UTC-6 (Central (CST))
  - Summer (DST): UTC-5 (CDT)
- FIPS code: 27-11926
- GNIS feature ID: 0663822

Clifton Township is a township in Lyon County, Minnesota, United States. The population was 288 at the 2000 census. The unincorporated community of Dudley is located within the township.

Clifton Township was organized in 1876.

== Geography ==
According to the United States Census Bureau, the township has a total area of 36.2 square miles (94 km^{2}), of which 36.1 square miles (93 km^{2}) is land and 0.1 square miles (0.26 km^{2}) (0.19%) is water.

== Demographics ==
As of the census of 2000, there were 288 people, 94 households, and 78 families residing in the township. The population density was 8.0 inhabitants per square mile (3.1/km^{2}). There were 101 housing units at an average density of 2.8 per square mile (1.1/km^{2}). The racial makeup of the township was 94.44% White, 1.04% African American, 1.04% Native American and 3.47% Asian.

There were 94 households, out of which 45.7% had children under the age of 18 living with them, 73.4% were married couples living together, 6.4% had a female householder with no husband present, and 16.0% were non-families. 10.6% of all households were made up of individuals, and 4.3% had someone living alone who was 65 years of age or older. The average household size was 3.06 and the average family size was 3.34.

In the township the population was spread out, with 35.4% under the age of 18, 4.9% from 18 to 24, 30.2% from 25 to 44, 18.1% from 45 to 64, and 11.5% who were 65 years of age or older. The median age was 34 years. For every 100 females, there were 111.8 males. For every 100 females age 18 and over, there were 116.3 males.

The median income for a household in the township was $48,750, and the median income for a family was $51,250. Males had a median income of $35,750 versus $25,179 for females. The per capita income for the township was $19,237. About 5.0% of families and 6.8% of the population were below the poverty line, including 7.5% of those under the age of eighteen and 16.7% of those 65 or over.
