= Minnesota State Highway 277 =

State highway in Minnesota, United States

Trunk Highway 277
- MN 277 highlighted in red

Route information
- Maintained by MnDOT
- Length: 11.025 mi (17.743 km)
- Existed: July 1, 1949–September 16, 2019

Major junctions
- South end: MN 7 near Clara City
- North end: MN 40 at Louriston Township

Location
- Country: United States
- State: Minnesota
- Counties: Chippewa

Highway system
- Minnesota Trunk Highway System; Interstate; US; State; Legislative; Scenic
| ← MN 275 | → MN 280 |

Minnesota State Highway 277 (MN 277) was a 11.025-mile-long (17.743 km) highway in west-central Minnesota. It ran from its intersection with State Highway 7 in Stoneham Township near Clara City and Maynard; and continued to its northern terminus at its intersection with State Highway 40 in Louriston Township, 20 miles west of Willmar.

In 2019, the route was marked as Chippewa County State-Aid Highway 4.

== Route description ==
Highway 277 served as a north–south connector route in west-central Minnesota between State Highways 7 and 40. It passed through the unincorporated town of Gluek.

The roadway followed 60th Avenue SE and 60th Avenue NE in Chippewa County.

The route was legally defined as Route 277 in the Minnesota Statutes.

== History ==
Highway 277 was authorized on July 1, 1949.

The route was paved in 1956.

On September 16, 2019, the state transferred ownership to Chippewa County and the road is no longer part of the state highway system.

== Major intersections ==
The entire route is in Chippewa County.

| Location | mi | km | Destinations | Notes |
|---|---|---|---|---|
| Stoneham Township | 0.000 | 0.000 | MN 7 (50th Street SE) – Clara City, Montevideo CSAH 4 south (60th Avenue SE) – Maynard | Southern terminus |
| Crate Township | 3.010 | 4.844 | CR 36 west (20th Street SE) | |
| Crate Township | 5.018 | 8.076 | CSAH 13 (1st Street E) | |
| Crate–Louriston township line | 8.009 | 12.889 | CSAH 12 (30th Street NE) | |
| Louriston Township | 11.023 | 17.740 | MN 40 (60th Street NE) – Willmar, Milan CSAH 4 north (60th Avenue NE) – De Graff | Northern terminus |
1.000 mi = 1.609 km; 1.000 km = 0.621 mi
