= Minnesota State Highway 40 =

State highway in Minnesota, United States

Trunk Highway 40
- MN 40 highlighted in red

Route information
- Maintained by MnDOT
- Length: 72.723 mi (117.036 km)
- Existed: 1933–present

Major junctions
- West end: SD 20 near Marietta, MN, and Revillo, SD
- US 75 at Madison; US 59 / MN 7 at Milan
- East end: CSAH 5 in Willmar

Location
- Country: United States
- State: Minnesota
- Counties: Lac qui Parle, Chippewa, Kandiyohi

Highway system
- Minnesota Trunk Highway System; Interstate; US; State; Legislative; Scenic
← MN 39	→ MN 41

Minnesota State Highway 40 (MN 40) is a 72.723-mile-long (117.036 km) state highway in west-central Minnesota, which travels from South Dakota Highway 20 (SD 20) at the South Dakota state line near Marietta and continues east to its eastern terminus at its intersection with County State-Aid Highway 5 (CSAH 5) in Willmar.

== Route description ==
MN 40 serves as an east–west route between Madison and Willmar in west-central Minnesota.

The route is also known as:

- 1st Street in Madison
- Lac qui Parle Avenue in Milan
- 60th Street throughout Chippewa County

MN 40 crosses Lac qui Parle Lake west of Milan.

Lac qui Parle State Park is located seven miles (11 km) south of the junction of MN 40 and US Highway 59 (US 59) at Milan. The park entrance is located on CSAH 13 near US 59 at Watson.

MN 40 parallels US 12 and US 212 throughout its route in west-central Minnesota.

== History ==
Most of MN 40 was authorized in 1933.

The section of the route between US 75 at Madison and the South Dakota state line was authorized c. 1950.

MN 40 was still gravel in 1940. The route was mostly paved by 1953, except for just west of Willmar. MN 40 was completely paved by 1958.

In 2009, its eastern terminus was moved from US 12 in Willmar to CSAH 5 (30th Street SW).

== Major intersections ==
County	Location	mi	km	Destinations	Notes
Lac qui Parle	Augusta Township	0.000	0.000	SD 20 west – Revillo	Western terminus; continuation into South Dakota
Lac qui Parle	Madison	12.600	20.278	US 75 south	Southern end of US 75 concurrency
Lac qui Parle	Madison	12.679	20.405	US 75 north	Northern end of US 75 concurrency
Lac qui Parle	Hantho Township	24.057	38.716	MN 119 – Appleton	
Minnesota River/Lac qui Parle		28.573– 28.615	45.984– 46.051	Milan Bridge	
Chippewa	Milan	32.413	52.164	US 59 / MN 7 – Montevideo, Appleton	
Chippewa	Mandt Township	41.737	67.169	MN 29 south – Montevideo	Western end of MN 29 concurrency
Chippewa	Grace Township	47.725	76.806	MN 29 north – Benson	Eastern end of MN 29 concurrency
Chippewa	Louriston Township	53.699	86.420	CSAH 4 – Gluek, De Graff	Former MN 277 south
Kandiyohi	Willmar	72.723	117.036	CSAH 5 (30th Street SW)	Eastern terminus
1.000 mi = 1.609 km; 1.000 km = 0.621 mi: Concurrency terminus
