= Minnesota State Highway 119 =

State highway in Minnesota, United States

Trunk Highway 119
- MN 119 highlighted in red

Route information
- Maintained by MnDOT
- Length: 25.1 mi (40.4 km)
- Existed: April 22, 1933–present

Major junctions
- South end: US 212 in Dawson
- MN 40 in Hantho Township; US 59 / MN 7 in Appleton
- North end: US 12 in Shible Township

Location
- Country: United States
- State: Minnesota
- Counties: Lac qui Parle, Swift

Highway system
- Minnesota Trunk Highway System; Interstate; US; State; Legislative; Scenic
← MN 117	→ MN 120

Minnesota State Highway 119 (MN 119) is a 15.108-mile-long (24.314 km) state highway in west-central Minnesota, which runs from its intersection with U.S. Highway 212 (US 212) in Dawson and continues north to its northern terminus at its intersection with U.S. Highway 12 (US 12) in Shible Township. The route passes through the city of Appleton.

== Route description ==
MN 119 serves as a north–south route in west-central Minnesota between US 12 and U.S. Highway 212.

MN 119 crosses the Minnesota River and Lac qui Parle Lake at the county line.

The route runs concurrently with US 59 and MN 7 on Munsterman Street through the city of Appleton for 14 blocks.

MN 119 parallels US 75 throughout its route.

The route is legally defined as Route 144 in the Minnesota Statutes. It is not marked with this number.

The highway is also designated Theodore Christianson Memorial Drive.

== History ==
MN 119 was authorized in 1933.

The route was mostly paved by 1940 and completely paved by 1953.

The route was extended south from MN 40 to US 212 in 2017 as part of a road exchange, replacing Lac qui Parle County State-Aid Highway 25. At the same time, Minnesota State Highway 275 was turned back to county control.

== Major intersections ==
County	Location	mi	km	Destinations	Notes
Lac qui Parle	Hantho Township	0.000	0.000	MN 40 / Minnesota River Valley Scenic Byway – Madison, Milan	Southern terminus; roadway continues south as MN 40
Lac qui Parle	Hantho Township	4.977	8.010	CSAH 34 west / Minnesota River Valley Scenic Byway – Louisburg	
Minnesota River/Lac qui Parle		5.387– 5.415	8.670– 8.715	Twin Bridge (south span)	
Minnesota River/Lac qui Parle		5.545– 5.575	8.924– 8.972	Twin Bridge (north span)	
Swift	Appleton	9.003	14.489	US 59 south / MN 7 east – Montevideo	Southern end of US 59/MN 7 concurrency
Swift	Appleton	9.805	15.780	US 59 north / MN 7 west – Morris, Ortonville	Northern end of US 59/MN 7 concurrency
Swift	Shible Township	15.124	24.340	US 12 / CSAH 5 north – Benson, Ortonville	Northern terminus; roadway continues north as CSAH 5
1.000 mi = 1.609 km; 1.000 km = 0.621 mi: Concurrency terminus
