= Asbury =

Asbury may refer to:

== People ==
- Cory Asbury (born 1985), American Christian musician and worship pastor
- Francis Asbury (1745–1816), Methodist bishop and key figure in the development of religion in the United States
- Herbert Asbury (1889–1963), American journalist and writer
- Shawn Asbury II, American football player
- Willie Asbury (born 1943), American football player

== Places in the United States ==
- Asbury, Alabama
- Asbury, Dale County, Alabama
- Asbury, Iowa
- Asbury, Kentucky
- Asbury, Minnesota
- Asbury, Missouri
- Asbury, New Jersey
- Asbury Park, New Jersey
- Asbury, Stokes County, North Carolina
- Asbury, Wake County, North Carolina, in Wake County, North Carolina
- Asbury, West Virginia

== Other ==
- Asbury (CTA station)
- Asbury Automotive Group
- Asbury College (disambiguation)
- Asbury Park (disambiguation)
- Asbury Theological Seminary, a Kentucky seminary that came out of Asbury College
- Asbury University, a Kentucky educational institution named after Bishop Francis Asbury
