= Louriston, Minnesota =

Unincorporated community in Minnesota, US

Louriston
- Unincorporated community
- Location within Minnesota Location within the United States
- Coordinates: 45°05′40″N 95°27′07″W
- Country: United States
- State: Minnesota
- County: Chippewa
- Elevation: 1,047 ft (319 m)
- Time zone: UTC-6 (Central (CST))
  - Summer (DST): UTC-5 (CDT)
- Area code: 320
- GNIS feature ID: 654528

Louriston (also Lorriston) is an unincorporated community in Louriston Township, Chippewa County, Minnesota, United States.
