= Mary Fitzbutler Waring =

American physician

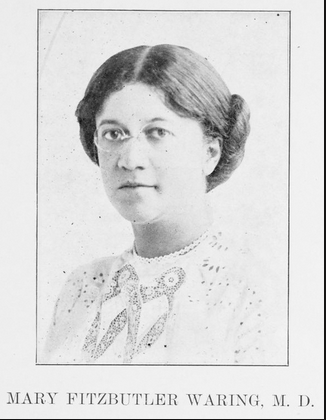
Mary Fitzbutler Waring, in a 1922 publication.

Dr. Mary Fitzbutler Waring, [ca. 1890].

Mary Fitzbutler Waring (1870–1958) was an American physician who succeeded Mary McLeod Bethune as president of the National Association of Colored Women's Clubs (NACWC) from 1933 to 1937.

== Early life ==
Mary R. Fitzbutler was born in Amherstburg, Ontario and raised in Louisville, Kentucky, the daughter of William Henry Fitzbutler and Sarah Helen McCurdy Fitzbutler. Both of her parents were physicians; her mother was the first black woman to earn a medical degree in Kentucky, and her father was the first black graduate of the University of Michigan's medical school. Mary R. Fitzbutler studied at the Louisville National Medical College (which her father owned and operated); she graduated from the National Medical College of Chicago in 1923.

== Career ==
Mary Fitzbutler taught for several years as a young woman. She was an officer in the Illinois Federation of Women's Clubs in 1913. During World War I, Waring was chair of Red Cross Work for the National Association of Colored Women's Clubs; she was also chair of the organization's Department of Health and Hygiene for many years. She organized a canteen, and nurses' training classes in Chicago for African-American women, during the war. After the war, she attended the 1920 International Council of Women meeting in Christiania, Norway. She was appointed to the advisory board of the Frederick Douglass Home in 1923. She regularly wrote columns on public health topics for women's publications, including National Notes.

In 1933, she was elected president of the National Association of Colored Women's Clubs. During her presidency, one of her policy initiatives was a drive to destroy toy guns.

== Personal life ==
Mary R. Fitzbutler married educator Frank B. Waring in 1901. She was widowed when he died in 1923. She married again, to Charles F. Cantrell, in 1930. She died in 1958, aged 88 years, in Chicago.
