= Tunsberg =

Tunsberg may refer to:

- the old name of Tønsberg, Norway
- Tunsberg Township in Minnesota, most likely named after the Norwegian town
- Diocese of Tunsberg, a diocese in Norway
- Jørn Inge Tunsberg, Norwegian metal musician
