= Bunde, Minnesota =

Unincorporated community in Minnesota, US

Bunde
- Unincorporated community
- Location within Minnesota Location within the United States
- Coordinates: 44°56′05″N 95°18′37″W
- Country: United States
- State: Minnesota
- County: Chippewa
- Elevation: 1,073 ft (327 m)
- Time zone: UTC-6 (Central (CST))
  - Summer (DST): UTC-5 (CDT)
- Area code: 320
- GNIS feature ID: 640642

Bunde is an unincorporated community located in Chippewa County, Minnesota, United States, and can be found approximately 100 miles due west of Minneapolis.

== History ==
Bunde was founded by W.D. Ammermann. In 1887, W.D. moved to Minnesota from Bunde, Germany, which was in the Rheiderland District. He originally wanted to name the township in which he settled after Bunde, Germany, but it didn't stick. So he instead named the township after the district in Germany where he was from. He then built a church and named it Bunde Christian Reformed Church.

== Geography ==
Bunde is located 100 miles west of Minneapolis. The closest town, Clara City is located 2.6 miles away, with a population of approximately 1,300. The town of Willmar is the closest town with a larger population, located 20 minutes northeast of Bunde. Willmar has a population of about 20,000 people.

== Population ==
At the 1990 US Census, the population was estimated to be approximately 50 people. Today, there are estimated to be only 25 people living in the town. The town had eight houses, but one was razed. Some people live in the town, and others live in the country surrounding the area.
