= Gracelock, Minnesota =

Unincorporated community in Minnesota, US

Gracelock
- Unincorporated community
- Location within Minnesota Location within the United States
- Coordinates: 45°03′02″N 95°34′50″W
- Country: United States
- State: Minnesota
- County: Chippewa
- Elevation: 1,033 ft (315 m)
- Time zone: UTC-6 (Central (CST))
  - Summer (DST): UTC-5 (CDT)
- Area code: 320
- GNIS feature ID: 654730

Gracelock (also Havelock) is an unincorporated community in Havelock Township, Chippewa County, Minnesota, United States.

It is not governed by a local municipal corporation.
