= Horace Signor Brannon =

American physician (1884 – 1970)

- Born: January 19, 1884; Louisville, Kentucky, U.S.
- Died: October 20, 1970 (aged 86); Louisville, Kentucky, U.S.
- Education: Louisville National Medical College (1907)
- Occupation: physician
- Title: First Lieutenant
- Spouse(s): Octavia Brannon (d. approx 1930); Estella Shannon (d. 1960); Clysta B. Brannon
- Children: Lloyd Brannon
- Parent(s): Charles H. Brannon; Lottie Thurston
- Relatives: Hattie Brannon (sister); Susan Brannon (sister); Charles Brannon (brother)

Horace Signor Brannon (January 19, 1884 – October 20, 1970) was an American physician based in Louisville, Kentucky. He served in the 92nd Division during World War I, under the 365th Ambulance Company.

== Early life ==
Horace Signor Brannon was the oldest child of Charles H. Brannon and Lottie Thurston. He had two younger sisters, Susan and Hattie, and one younger brother, Charles. The family was situated in Louisville, Kentucky. Horace decided to remain home as he had entered Louisville National Medical College in 1903. The school had been founded in 1888 on the basis of training African Americans in the Medical Profession. However, due to financial difficulties the school closed in 1912 for financial reasons. Horace graduated in 1907 and opened a practice in his hometown.

== Military service ==
In 1917, the United States joined World War I and the entire nation was in a buzz to join the effort. After the declaration of war with Germany, many African-Americans were turned away from the local recruiting stations. Unprepared for a large scale conflict, the United States Army had only four black regiments, and many commanders would not allow mixing of blacks and whites in their units. Also, the black regiments themselves were not trusted to be sent to Europe, as many of the higher ups possessed a lack of confidence in black soldiers as fighters. Fort Des Moines Provisional Army Officer Training School had been opened for training African-American men as there had been a huge influx of African-American volunteers and a petition was erected by the students of Howard University. However, there was still some discontent at the facility as many soldiers found that he had been unfairly assessed for merely being black.

When Dr. Brannon answered the military's call for physicians he was immediately given the rank, First Lieutenant in the Army Medical Reserve Corps. Like all the African-American recruits, Brannon was sent to Fort Des Moines for medical training at the Medical Officers Training Camp. He was 33 years old and had been a practicing physician for 10 years. After completing his training, Brannon was ordered to the 92nd division at Camp Funston in Kansas and was assigned the 366th Field Hospital of the divisions 317th Sanitary Train.

When arriving at France, Bradfield was reassigned to work in the 365th Ambulance Company where he remained throughout the war. During World War I, Ambulance companies were responsible for conducted first aid stations to treat immediate wounds and find best manners in evacuating injured soldiers. When the United States entered the World War I effort, the army organized ambulance units to serve at the front with the French. The War Department Orders NO. 75 established the U.S. Army Ambulance Service (USAAS) and the Sanitary Corps followed a week later. Both were part of the evolution of the Medical Reserve Corps. This allowed the Medical Department to commission individuals in specialities if need be. Brannon also would have had his hands full with treating ill and influenza stricken soldiers as life in the trenches was hard.

Upon the 92nd Division's entry into French soil, it was moved to the St. Dre Sector to relief the 5th Regular U.S. Army Division (composed of white soldiers). Only a few days later had the 5th Regular Division captured the village of Frapelle. Immediately, these fresh African American recruits were submerged into the harsh terrain of the trenches where the Germans had been sending aggressive assaults, such as frequent released of gassing shells to Allied troops. In mid September Frapelle face a heavy German bombardment as an airplane duel came into the mixture. With aerial and artillery fire coming from many sides, Brannon was on full deck. At some point during the attack, the Germans learned that the opposing force that faced them, the 92nd Division, was composed entirely of African Americans. The Germans decided to change tactics and went into the trenches. The U.S. troops believed that the Germans were sending another surge of gassing shells, however, when nothing emitted from the shells they went to investigate. Within the shells was a printed propaganda written in English. It was titled "To the Colored Soldiers of the American Army". The text continued saying:

Hello, boys, what are you doing over here? Fighting the Germans? Why? Have they ever done you any harm? Of course some white folks and the lying English-American papers told you that the Germans ought to be wiped out for the sake of Humanity and Democracy. What is Democracy? Personal freedom, all citizens enjoying the same rights socially and before the law. Do you enjoy the same rights as the white people do in America, the land of Freedom and Democracy, or are you rather not treated over there as second-class citizens? Can you go into a restaurant where white people dine? Can you get a seat in the theater where white people sit? Can you get a seat or a berth in the railroad car, or can you even ride, in the South, in the same street car with white people? And how about the law? Is lynching and the most horrible crimes connected therewith a lawful proceeding in a democratic country? Now, this is all different in Germany, where they do like colored people, where they treat them as gentlemen and as white people, and quite a number of colored people have fine positions in business in Berlin and other German cities. Why, then, fight the Germans only for the benefit of the Wall street robbers and to protect the millions they have loaned to the British, French, and Italians? You have been made the tool of the egotistic and rapacious rich in England and in America, and there is nothing in the whole game for you but broken bones, horrible wounds, spoiled health, or death. No satisfaction whatever will you get out of this unjust war. You have never seen Germany. So you are fools if you allow people to make you hate us. Come over and see for yourself. Let those do the fighting who make the profit out of this war. Don't allow them to use you as cannon fodder. To carry a gun in this war is not an honor, but a shame. Throw it away and come over into the German lines. You will find friends who will help you along.

Brannon and his fellow soldiers did not fall for the bait and continued fighting to their "honor and credit", according to Emmett J. Scott. The fighting continued with more aerial fire coming from the Germans, however, the French anti-aircraft guns got rid of the assault and the division moved from St. Die Sector to Ste. Menehold. The 92nd Division became a reserve corps for the Mseu-Argonne campaign in October. In November, Brannon and his unit faced another aggressive assault from the Germans in Metz.

Brannon was honorably discharged in July 1919 and went home.

== Career ==
After the war, Dr. Brannon returned to Louisville to resume in his medical practice, as he was listed in the American Medical Directory. He didn't remain there for long, however. With his wife, Dr. Brannon moved to several cities in Kentucky to open different practices in the early 1920s. He finally returned to his hometown in 1930.

He spent the majority of his remaining life moving between Kentucky and Ohio while practicing medicine.

== Personal life ==
Before he had join World War I effort, Brannon married a woman named Octavia who had been a public school teacher. She died around 1930 when Brannon returned to Louisville. He married a second time to another widower named Estella Shannon who died in 1960. In the mid-1960s, while living in Cincinnati, Brannon married Clysta B. Brannon who survived him when he died (she had also been a school teacher). Brannon had one child, a son named Lloyd.

== Death ==
Dr. Brannon died at the age of 87 in 1970. He was survived by his sister, Hattie, his third wife, and son.
