= Wegdahl, Minnesota =

Unincorporated community in Minnesota, US

Wegdahl
- Unincorporated community
- Location within Minnesota Location within the United States
- Coordinates: 44°53′24″N 95°38′43″W
- Country: United States
- State: Minnesota
- County: Chippewa
- Elevation: 945 ft (288 m)
- Time zone: UTC-6 (Central (CST))
  - Summer (DST): UTC-5 (CDT)
- Area code: 320
- GNIS feature ID: 653890

Wegdahl is an unincorporated community in Chippewa County, in the U.S. state of Minnesota.

Brafees Creek flows into the Minnesota River in the area.

== History ==
A post office called Wegdahl was established in 1871, and remained in operation until it was discontinued in 1957. The community was named for Hemming Arntzen Wegdahl, the original owner of the town site and first postmaster.
