= United Brothers of Friendship =

United Brothers of Friendship (UBF) was a benevolent organization for African American men established in 1861 in Louisville, Kentucky. It grew to have about 60,000 members.

It met at the Centre-Street Baptist Church and later at the Quinn Chapel Baptist Church. In 1866 a lodge at Shelbyville, Kentucky, was established. Chapters were added and the benevolent society grew to 29 chapters. A branch for females called the Sisters of the Mysterious Ten (SMT) was established.

Several members managed the Ohio Falls Express newspaper in Louisville, Kentucky including William Henry Fitzbutler.

A lodge in Asbury, Kentucky, was established in 1865. F. D. Morton and Charles L. Asbury served as national grand master of the group.

A "ritual and degree" book was published for the group. W. H. Gibson Sr. had a history of the organization published in 1897. Lodge buildings included one in Paris, Kentucky.

The organizations declined from the late 1940s into the 1960s.

== See also ==
- Elijah Preston Marrs
