= Swensson Farm Museum =

Historic Farmstead in Chippewa County, Minnesota, United States

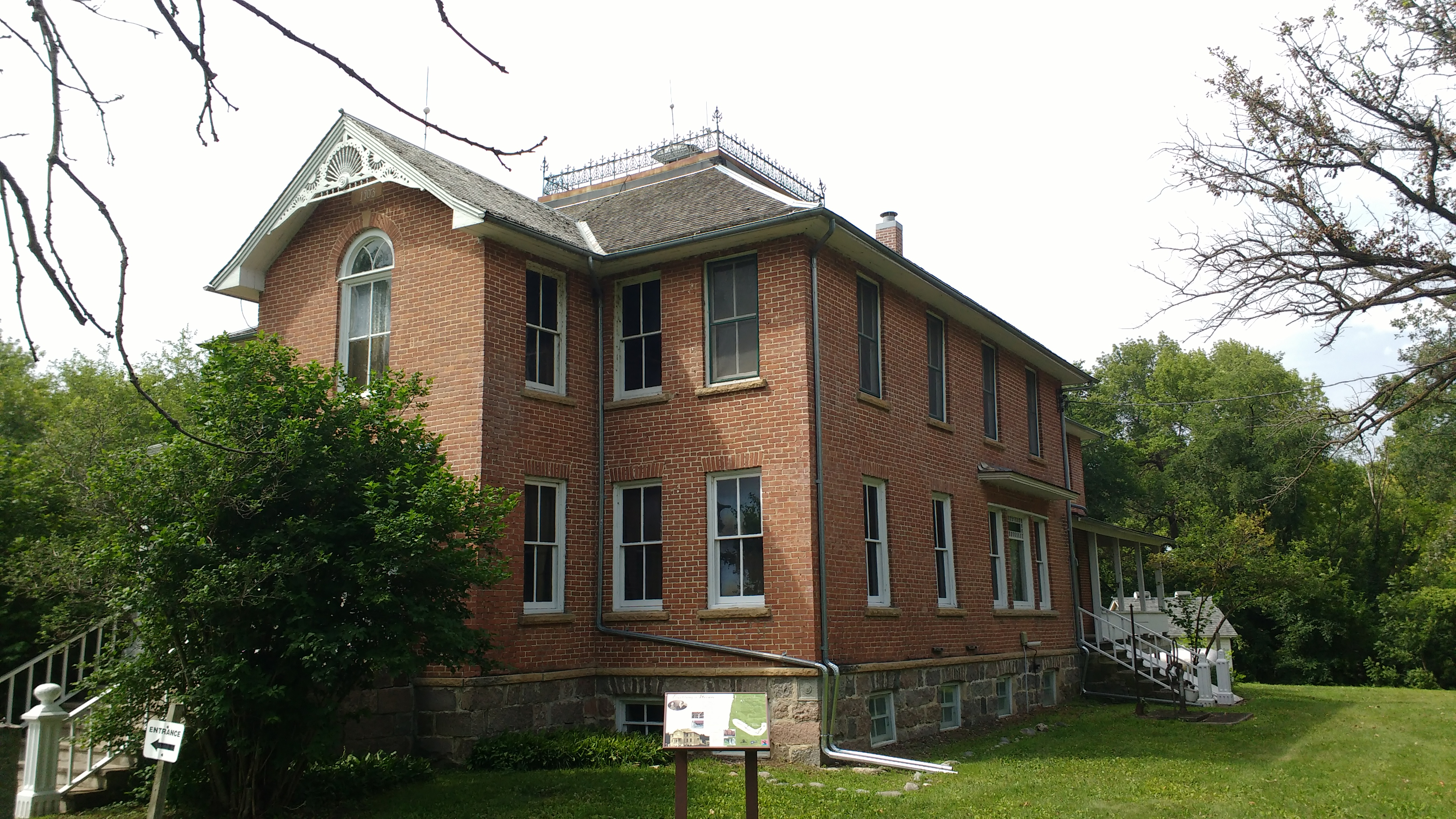
- Swensson farm house
- Established: 1967
- Location: 115 100th Street SE, Granite Falls, Minnesota 56241
- Type: Local History
- Executive director: Celeste Suter
- Website: chippewacohistory.org

- Olof Swensson Farm
- U.S. National Register of Historic Places
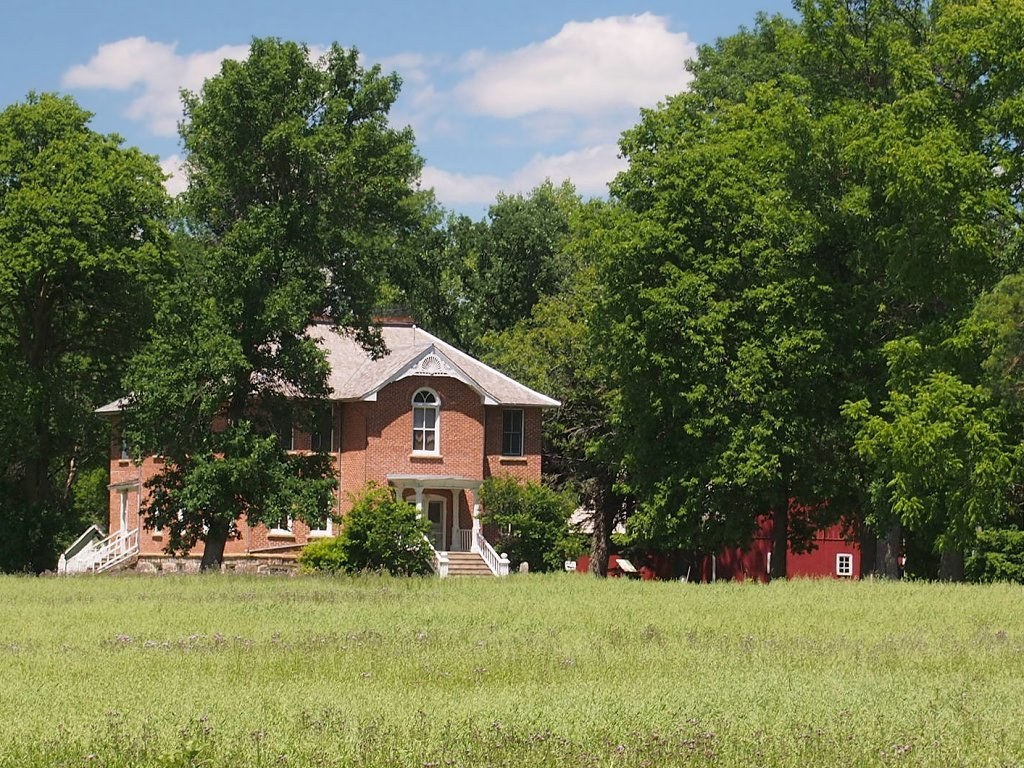
- Olof Swensson Farmstead

- Location within Minnesota Location within the United States
- Location: 115 100th Street SE, Granite Falls, Minnesota 56241
- Coordinates: 44.878568°N 95.592478°W
- Area: 17 acres (6.9 ha)
- Built: 1901-1903
- Architect: Olof Swensson
- Architectural style: Italianate, Georgian
- NRHP reference No.: 74001010
- Added to NRHP: December 30, 1974

The Swensson Farm Museum is a historic farmstead located in Chippewa County, Minnesota, six miles (10 km) east of Montevideo. Established by Norwegian immigrants Olof and Ingeborg Swensson in the 1880s, the farmstead today serves as open-air museum operated by the Chippewa County Historical Society showcasing pioneer life and Swedish-American heritage.

== The farmstead ==
The centerpiece of the museum is a grand 22-room brick farmhouse built around the turn of the 20th century. Many original furnishings are retained in the interior of the house. The farmhouse also contains a 38x38 foot chapel on the second floor, where Swensson delivered his own sermons. In the basement, the house contains designated areas were allocated for metalworking, woodworking, harness and blacksmithing, along with a room for agriculture and a fruit cellar.

Elsewhere on the grounds, there stand an 1880s wooden barn and a grist mill that was originally animal-powered, then steam-powered.

The Swensson Farm Museum is listed on the National Register of Historic Places, for its architecture and its contributions to the social history of Minnesota.

== See also ==
- List of museums in Minnesota
