= Woods Township, Chippewa County, Minnesota =

Woods Township, Minnesota
- Township
- Location within the state of Minnesota Woods Township, Minnesota (the United States)
- Coordinates: 45°6′50″N 95°19′8″W
- Country: United States
- State: Minnesota
- County: Chippewa

Area
  - Total: 36.2 sq mi (93.7 km^{2})
  - Land: 36.2 sq mi (93.7 km^{2})
  - Water: 0 sq mi (0.0 km^{2})
- Elevation: 1,089 ft (332 m)

Population (2000)
  - Total: 242
  - Density: 6.7/sq mi (2.6/km^{2})
- Time zone: UTC-6 (Central (CST))
  - Summer (DST): UTC-5 (CDT)
- FIPS code: 27-71626
- GNIS feature ID: 0666046

Woods Township is a township in Chippewa County, Minnesota, United States. The population was 242 at the 2000 census.

== History ==
Woods Township was organized in 1879, and named for Judge William W. Woods.

== Geography ==
According to the United States Census Bureau, the township has a total area of 36.2 square miles (93.7 km^{2}), of which 36.2 square miles (93.7 km^{2}) is land and 0.04 square mile (0.1 km^{2}) (0.06%) is water.

== Demographics ==
As of the census of 2000, there were 242 people, 81 households, and 72 families residing in the township. The population density was 6.7 people per square mile (2.6/km^{2}). There were 88 housing units at an average density of 2.4/sq mi (0.9/km^{2}). The racial makeup of the township was 96.69% White, 2.48% African American, 0.41% Asian, 0.41% from other races. Hispanic or Latino of any race were 0.41% of the population.

There were 81 households, out of which 43.2% had children under the age of 18 living with them, 80.2% were married couples living together, 6.2% had a female householder with no husband present, and 11.1% were non-families. 9.9% of all households were made up of individuals, and 3.7% had someone living alone who was 65 years of age or older. The average household size was 2.99 and the average family size was 3.19.

In the township the population was spread out, with 31.8% under the age of 18, 5.4% from 18 to 24, 29.3% from 25 to 44, 22.3% from 45 to 64, and 11.2% who were 65 years of age or older. The median age was 37 years. For every 100 females, there were 95.2 males. For every 100 females age 18 and over, there were 98.8 males.

The median income for a household in the township was $44,375, and the median income for a family was $46,250. Males had a median income of $27,750 versus $21,000 for females. The per capita income for the township was $39,374. About 5.7% of families and 6.8% of the population were below the poverty line, including 6.8% of those under the age of eighteen and 14.3% of those 65 or over.
