= Rheiderland Township, Chippewa County, Minnesota =

Rheiderland Township, Minnesota
- Township
- Location within the state of Minnesota Rheiderland Township, Minnesota (the United States)
- Coordinates: 44°56′21″N 95°19′13″W
- Country: United States
- State: Minnesota
- County: Chippewa

Area
  - Total: 34.7 sq mi (90.0 km^{2})
  - Land: 34.7 sq mi (90.0 km^{2})
  - Water: 0 sq mi (0.0 km^{2})
- Elevation: 1,073 ft (327 m)

Population (2000)
  - Total: 328
  - Density: 9.3/sq mi (3.6/km^{2})
- Time zone: UTC-6 (Central (CST))
  - Summer (DST): UTC-5 (CDT)
- FIPS code: 27-53962
- GNIS feature ID: 0665403

Rheiderland Township is a township in Chippewa County, Minnesota, United States. The population was 328 at the 2000 census.

== History ==
Rheiderland Township was organized in 1887.

== Geography ==
According to the United States Census Bureau, the township has a total area of 34.8 square miles (90.0 km^{2}), all land.

== Demographics ==
As of the census of 2000, there were 328 people, 104 households, and 89 families residing in the township. The population density was 9.4 people per square mile (3.6/km^{2}). There were 115 housing units at an average density of 3.3/sq mi (1.3/km^{2}). The racial makeup of the township was 98.17% White, 0.91% African American, 0.30% Asian, and 0.61% from two or more races.

There were 104 households, out of which 51.9% had children under the age of 18 living with them, 80.8% were married couples living together, 2.9% had a female householder with no husband present, and 13.5% were non-families. 12.5% of all households were made up of individuals, and 4.8% had someone living alone who was 65 years of age or older. The average household size was 3.15 and the average family size was 3.48.

In the township the population was spread out, with 37.2% under the age of 18, 5.5% from 18 to 24, 26.8% from 25 to 44, 21.3% from 45 to 64, and 9.1% who were 65 years of age or older. The median age was 32 years. For every 100 females, there were 107.6 males. For every 100 females age 18 and over, there were 108.1 males.

The median income for a household in the township was $36,250, and the median income for a family was $40,000. Males had a median income of $28,250 versus $21,667 for females. The per capita income for the township was $11,951. About 3.9% of families and 6.1% of the population were below the poverty line, including 11.0% of those under age 18 and none of those age 65 or over.
