= Asbury Park (disambiguation) =

Asbury Park is a city in Monmouth County, New Jersey, United States.

Asbury Park may also refer to:

- Asbury Park station, a NJ Transit station in Asbury Park
- SS Asbury Park, a 1903 coastal steamship and ferry
- "Asbury Park", a song by King Crimson from the 1975 album USA

== See also ==
- Asbury (disambiguation)
