= Churchill, Chippewa County, Minnesota =

Unincorporated community in Minnesota, US

Churchill
- Unincorporated community
- Location within Minnesota Location within the United States
- Coordinates: 45°01′19″N 95°52′01″W
- Country: United States
- State: Minnesota
- County: Chippewa
- Elevation: 955 ft (291 m)
- Time zone: UTC-6 (Central (CST))
  - Summer (DST): UTC-5 (CDT)
- Area code: 320
- GNIS feature ID: 654644

Churchill is an unincorporated community in Chippewa County, Minnesota, United States.
