= Gluek, Minnesota =

Unincorporated community in Minnesota, US

Gluek
- Unincorporated community
- Location within Minnesota Location within the United States
- Coordinates: 44°59′07″N 95°28′24″W
- Country: United States
- State: Minnesota
- County: Chippewa
- Elevation: 1,040 ft (320 m)
- Time zone: UTC-6 (Central (CST))
  - Summer (DST): UTC-5 (CDT)
- Area code: 320
- GNIS feature ID: 644191

Gluek (/ɡlɪk/ GLIK) is an unincorporated community in Crate Township, Chippewa County, Minnesota, United States. There was a terminus point on the Minnesota Western Railroad in the community until the railroad was abandoned. The primary route to Gluek, Chippewa County Road 4, was formerly Minnesota State Highway 277.
