= Lone Tree Township, Chippewa County, Minnesota =

Lone Tree Township, Minnesota
- Township
- Location within the state of Minnesota Lone Tree Township, Minnesota (the United States)
- Coordinates: 45°1′27″N 95°18′40″W
- Country: United States
- State: Minnesota
- County: Chippewa

Area
  - Total: 36.2 sq mi (93.8 km^{2})
  - Land: 36.2 sq mi (93.8 km^{2})
  - Water: 0 sq mi (0.0 km^{2})
- Elevation: 1,079 ft (329 m)

Population (2000)
  - Total: 256
  - Density: 7.0/sq mi (2.7/km^{2})
- Time zone: UTC-6 (Central (CST))
  - Summer (DST): UTC-5 (CDT)
- FIPS code: 27-37952
- GNIS feature ID: 0664815

Lone Tree Township is a township in Chippewa County, Minnesota, United States. The population was 256 at the 2000 census. According to 2023 census data, the population of Lone Tree Township decreased to 167.

== History ==
Lone Tree Township was organized in 1878, and named from an individual cottonwood tree which stood as a landmark for the first settlers.

== Geography ==
According to the United States Census Bureau, the township has a total area of 36.2 square miles (93.8 km^{2}), all land.

== Demographics ==
As 2023, there were 167 people and 61 households in the township. The population density was 4.6 inhabitants per square mile (1.8/km^{2}). There were approximately 78 housing units. The racial makeup of the township was approximately 83% White, 1% mixed race, and 16% Hispanic or Latino.

Approximately 68% of the population was composed of married couples. The average household size was 2.7 persons.

In the township the population was spread out, with 32% under the age of 18, 53% between the age of 18 and 64, and 15% over the age of 64. The median age was 32.5 years old.

The median income for a household in the township was $91,875, meaningfully greater than the county median of $69,192 and the state median of $87,556. The per capita income for the township was $49,674. About 2.4% of the population was below the poverty line.
