= Marietta, Minnesota =

City in Minnesota, United States

Marietta
- City
- Location of Marietta, Minnesota
- Coordinates: 45°00′38″N 96°25′08″W
- Country: United States
- State: Minnesota
- County: Lac qui Parle
- Named for: Marietta, Ohio

Area
  - Total: 0.37 sq mi (0.95 km^{2})
  - Land: 0.37 sq mi (0.95 km^{2})
  - Water: 0 sq mi (0.00 km^{2})
- Elevation: 1,116 ft (340 m)

Population (2020)
  - Total: 116
  - Density: 316.2/sq mi (122.07/km^{2})
- Time zone: UTC-6 (Central (CST))
  - Summer (DST): UTC-5 (CDT)
- ZIP code: 56257
- Area code: 320
- FIPS code: 27-40526
- GNIS feature ID: 2395006

Marietta is a city in Lac qui Parle County, Minnesota, United States on Minnesota State Highway 40 near the South Dakota border. The population was 116 at the 2020 census.

== History ==
Marietta was platted in 1884. A post office has been in operation at Marietta since 1884. A share of the early settlers were natives of Marietta, Ohio. The city was incorporated in 1899.

== Geography ==
According to the United States Census Bureau, the city has a total area of 0.38 square miles (0.98 km^{2}), all land.

== Demographics ==
Historical population
Census	Pop.	Note	%±
1900	144		—
1910	338		134.7%
1920	413		22.2%
1930	344		−16.7%
1940	400		16.3%
1950	380		−5.0%
1960	327		−13.9%
1970	264		−19.3%
1980	279		5.7%
1990	211		−24.4%
2000	174		−17.5%
2010	162		−6.9%
2020	116		−28.4%
U.S. Decennial Census

=== 2010 census ===
As of the census of 2010, there were 162 people, 82 households, and 46 families living in the city. The population density was 426.3 inhabitants per square mile (164.6/km^{2}). There were 101 housing units at an average density of 265.8 per square mile (102.6/km^{2}). The racial makeup of the city was 98.8% White and 1.2% from two or more races.

There were 82 households, of which 18.3% had children under the age of 18 living with them, 36.6% were married couples living together, 11.0% had a female householder with no husband present, 8.5% had a male householder with no wife present, and 43.9% were non-families. 39.0% of all households were made up of individuals, and 18.3% had someone living alone who was 65 years of age or older. The average household size was 1.98 and the average family size was 2.52.

The median age in the city was 49.8 years. 14.8% of residents were under the age of 18; 8% were between the ages of 18 and 24; 16.1% were from 25 to 44; 36.4% were from 45 to 64; and 24.7% were 65 years of age or older. The gender makeup of the city was 50.0% male and 50.0% female.

=== 2000 census ===
As of the census of 2000, there were 174 people, 86 households, and 47 families living in the city. The population density was 445.2 inhabitants per square mile (171.9/km^{2}). There were 109 housing units at an average density of 278.9 per square mile (107.7/km^{2}). The racial makeup of the city was 100.00% White.

There were 86 households, out of which 19.8% had children under the age of 18 living with them, 45.3% were married couples living together, 8.1% had a female householder with no husband present, and 45.3% were non-families. 44.2% of all households were made up of individuals, and 25.6% had someone living alone who was 65 years of age or older. The average household size was 2.02 and the average family size was 2.83.

In the city, the population was spread out, with 20.7% under the age of 18, 6.3% from 18 to 24, 21.8% from 25 to 44, 21.8% from 45 to 64, and 29.3% who were 65 years of age or older. The median age was 46 years. For every 100 females, there were 97.7 males. For every 100 females age 18 and over, there were 89.0 males.

The median income for a household in the city was $16,923, and the median income for a family was $26,875. Males had a median income of $21,875 versus $15,625 for females. The per capita income for the city was $12,688. About 14.6% of families and 21.6% of the population were below the poverty line, including 33.3% of those under the age of eighteen and 18.4% of those 65 or over.
