= Brafees Creek =

Stream in Chippewa County, Minnesota, U.S.

Coordinates: 44°53′29″N 95°39′02″W

Brafees Creek is a stream in Chippewa County, Minnesota, in the United States.

Brafees Creek (or Brofee's Creek) was named for a pioneer settler.

== See also ==
- List of rivers of Minnesota
