= Kragero Township, Chippewa County, Minnesota =

Kragero Township, Minnesota
- Township
- Location within the state of Minnesota Kragero Township, Minnesota (the United States)
- Coordinates: 45°5′55″N 95°54′23″W
- Country: United States
- State: Minnesota
- County: Chippewa

Area
  - Total: 44.7 sq mi (115.8 km^{2})
  - Land: 41.5 sq mi (107.4 km^{2})
  - Water: 3.2 sq mi (8.4 km^{2})
- Elevation: 1,030 ft (314 m)

Population (2000)
  - Total: 164
  - Density: 3.9/sq mi (1.5/km^{2})
- Time zone: UTC-6 (Central (CST))
  - Summer (DST): UTC-5 (CDT)
- FIPS code: 27-33668
- GNIS feature ID: 0664643

Kragero Township is a township in Chippewa County, Minnesota, United States. The population was 164 at the 2000 census.

== History ==
Kragero Township was organized in 1873, with permanent settlement beginning in 1868. It was named for Hans H. Kragero, a Norwegian immigrant and early settler. The trading post of Joseph Renville was located in the southern part of the township as was a Presbyterian mission station which educated early settlers to the area.

== Geography ==
According to the United States Census Bureau, the township has a total area of 44.7 square miles (116 km^{2}), of which 41.5 square miles (107 km^{2}) is land and 3.2 square miles (8.3 km^{2}) (7.22%) is water.

== Demographics ==
As of the census of 2000, there were 164 people, 64 households, and 49 families residing in the township. The population density was 4.0 inhabitants per square mile (1.5/km^{2}). There were 79 housing units at an average density of 1.9 per square mile (0.73/km^{2}). The racial makeup of the township was 99.39% White and 0.61% Asian, or 163 Whites and 1 Asian.

There were 64 households, out of which 31.3% had children under the age of 18 living with them, 70.3% were married couples living together, 3.1% had a female householder with no husband present, and 21.9% were non-families. 18.8% of all households were made up of individuals, and 12.5% had someone living alone who was 65 years of age or older. The average household size was 2.56 and the average family size was 2.88.

In the township the population was spread out, with 24.4% under the age of 18, 7.9% from 18 to 24, 23.2% from 25 to 44, 29.3% from 45 to 64, and 15.2% who were 65 years of age or older. The median age was 41 years. For every 100 females, there were 100.0 males. For every 100 females age 18 and over, there were 103.3 males.

The median income for a household in the township was $42,292, and the median income for a family was $48,125. Males had a median income of $26,250 versus $21,607 for females. The per capita income for the township was $17,119. None of the families and 2.5% of the population were living below the poverty line.
