= Hagan, Minnesota =

Unincorporated community in Minnesota, US

Hagan
- Unincorporated community
- Location within Minnesota Location within the United States
- Coordinates: 45°08′55″N 95°46′34″W
- Country: United States
- State: Minnesota
- County: Chippewa
- Elevation: 1,020 ft (310 m)
- Time zone: UTC-6 (Central (CST))
  - Summer (DST): UTC-5 (CDT)
- Area code: 320
- GNIS feature ID: 644561

Hagan (also Hagen) is an unincorporated community in Big Bend Township, Chippewa County, Minnesota, United States.
