= Rosewood Township, Chippewa County, Minnesota =

Rosewood Township, Minnesota
- Township
- Location within the state of Minnesota Rosewood Township, Minnesota (the United States)
- Coordinates: 45°2′7″N 95°40′37″W
- Country: United States
- State: Minnesota
- County: Chippewa

Area
  - Total: 35.8 sq mi (92.6 km^{2})
  - Land: 35.7 sq mi (92.4 km^{2})
  - Water: 0.077 sq mi (0.2 km^{2})
- Elevation: 1,020 ft (311 m)

Population (2000)
  - Total: 303
  - Density: 8.5/sq mi (3.3/km^{2})
- Time zone: UTC-6 (Central (CST))
  - Summer (DST): UTC-5 (CDT)
- FIPS code: 27-55870
- GNIS feature ID: 0665471

Rosewood Township is a township in Chippewa County, Minnesota, United States. The population was 303 at the year 2000 census.

== History ==
Rosewood Township was organized in 1871, and named after Rosewood, Ohio, the former home of a share of early settlers.

== Geography ==
According to the United States Census Bureau, the township has a total area of 35.8 square miles (92.6 km^{2}), of which 35.7 square miles (92.4 km^{2}) is land and 0.1 square mile (0.2 km^{2}) (0.22%) is water.

== Demographics ==
As of the census of 2000, there were 303 people, 115 households, and 92 families residing in the township. The population density was 8.5 people per square mile (3.3/km^{2}). There were 123 housing units at an average density of 3.4/sq mi (1.3/km^{2}). The racial makeup of the township was 98.68% White, 0.66% African American, 0.33% Asian, 0.33% from other races. Hispanic or Latino of any race were 0.33% of the population.

There were 115 households, out of which 34.8% had children under the age of 18 living with them, 73.9% were married couples living together, 1.7% had a female householder with no husband present, and 20.0% were non-families. 19.1% of all households were made up of individuals, and 6.1% had someone living alone who was 65 years of age or older. The average household size was 2.63 and the average family size was 2.99.

In the township the population was spread out, with 24.4% under the age of 18, 10.6% from 18 to 24, 26.1% from 25 to 44, 24.4% from 45 to 64, and 14.5% who were 65 years of age or older. The median age was 39 years. For every 100 females, there were 109.0 males. For every 100 females age 18 and over, there were 114.0 males.

The median income for a household in the township was $36,250, and the median income for a family was $39,500. Males had a median income of $31,786 versus $18,125 for females. The per capita income for the township was $15,811. About 4.4% of families and 8.2% of the population were below the poverty line, including 8.7% of those under the age of eighteen and 9.1% of those 65 or over.
