= William Henry Fitzbutler =

American doctor (1842–1901)

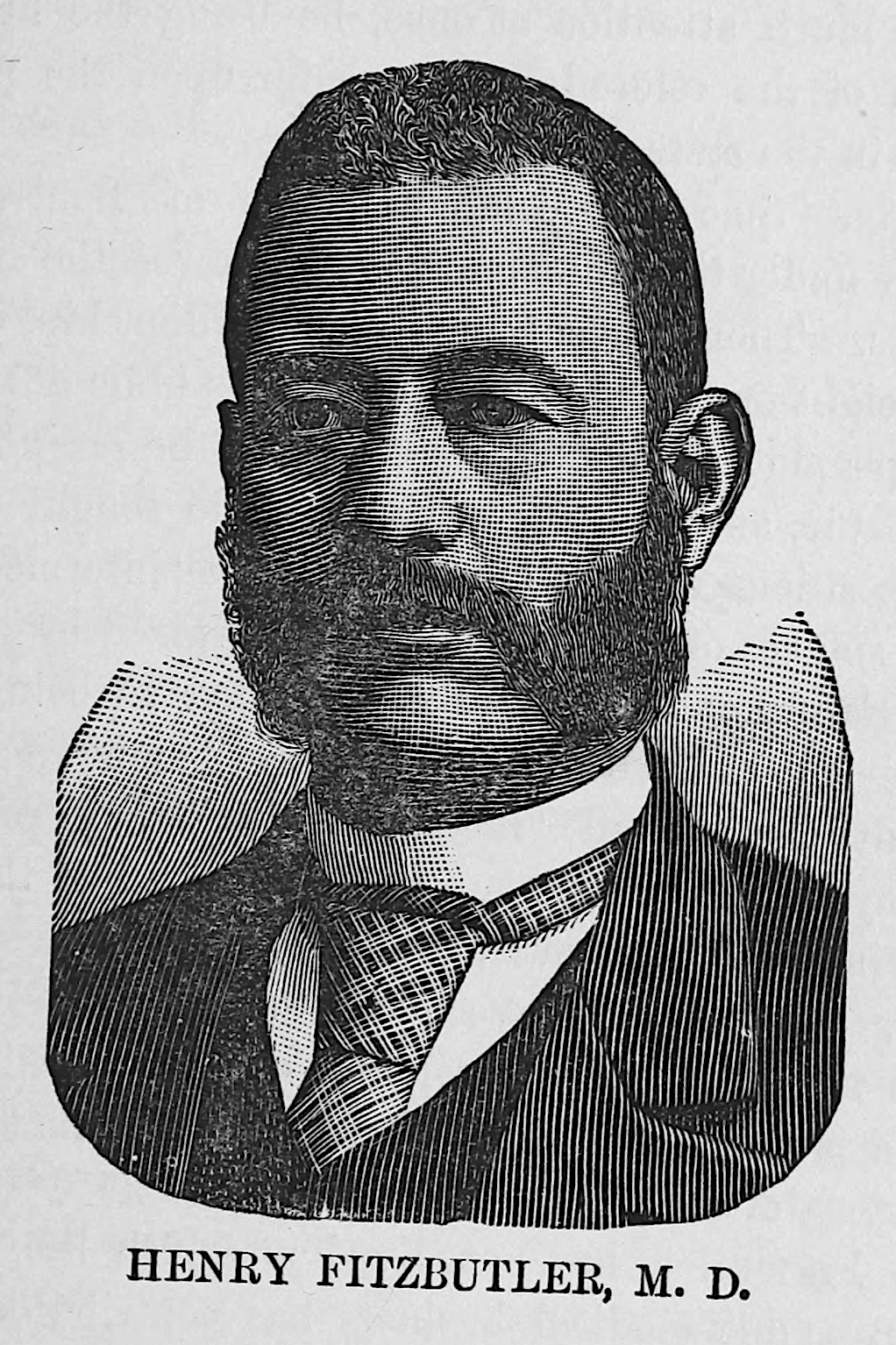
- Born: December 22, 1842; Virginia, U.S.
- Died: December 28, 1901 (aged 59); Louisville, Kentucky, U.S.
- Other name: Henry Fitzbutler
- Occupations: Educator, physician, medical school founder, newspaper editor, civil rights leader
- Known for: First African American to graduate from University of Michigan Medical School
- Spouse: Sarah Helen McCurdy
- Children: 6, including Mary Fitzbutler

William Henry Fitzbutler (1842–1901), also known as Henry Fitzbutler, was an American educator, doctor, medical school founder, newspaper editor, and civil rights leader. He was the first African American to graduate from University of Michigan's medical school in 1872. Fitzbutler was also the first African American to practice medicine in the state of Michigan. He founded Louisville National Medical College and helped establish Louisville Hospital.

== Biography ==
Fitzbutler was born on December 22, 1842, in Virginia, to a father who was enslaved. Their family escaped to Canada though the Underground Railroad, settling in Amherstburg, Essex County, Ontario. He apprenticed with Daniel Pearson, an African American doctor in Canada. He then studied at Adrian College and graduated from Detroit Medical School, followed by the University of Michigan Medical School.

He moved to Louisville, Kentucky where he worked with his wife, Sarah Helen McCurdy (1847–1922), providing medical care. He also published the Ohio Falls Express newspaper. One of his six children was physician Mary Fitzbutler Waring, born as Mary R. Fitzbutler.

He published the Ohio Falls Express from 1878 until 1904. It was Republican Party aligned. In 1882 T. Baxter was the paper's president, F. D. Morton its business manager, E. W. Marshall city manager, and Fitzbutler editor. They were members of the United Brothers of Friendship fraterbal organization.

He died on December 28, 1901, in Louisville. The Fitzbutler House at the University of Michigan is named for him.
