= Leenthrop Township, Chippewa County, Minnesota =

Leenthrop Township, Minnesota
- Township
- Location within the state of Minnesota Leenthrop Township, Minnesota (the United States)
- Coordinates: 44°55′38″N 95°32′40″W
- Country: United States
- State: Minnesota
- County: Chippewa

Area
  - Total: 35.7 sq mi (92.5 km^{2})
  - Land: 35.7 sq mi (92.5 km^{2})
  - Water: 0 sq mi (0.0 km^{2})
- Elevation: 1,027 ft (313 m)

Population (2000)
  - Total: 396
  - Density: 11/sq mi (4.3/km^{2})
- Time zone: UTC-6 (Central (CST))
  - Summer (DST): UTC-5 (CDT)
- FIPS code: 27-36278
- GNIS feature ID: 0664748

Leenthrop Township is a township in Chippewa County, Minnesota, United States. The population was 396 at the 2000 census.

== History ==
Leenthrop Township was organized in 1872. According to Warren Upham, the origin of the name Leenthrop is uncertain but probably Swedish.

== Geography ==
According to the United States Census Bureau, the township has a total area of 35.7 square miles (92 km^{2}), of which 35.7 square miles (92 km^{2}) is land and 99.93% is water.

== Demographics ==
As of the census of 2000, there were 396 people, 99 households, and 79 families residing in the township. The population density was 11.1 inhabitants per square mile (4.3/km^{2}). There were 104 housing units at an average density of 2.9 per square mile (1.1/km^{2}). The racial makeup of the township was 98.48% White, 0.76% from other races, and 0.76% from two or more races. Hispanic or Latino of any race were 0.76% of the population.

There were 99 households, out of which 41.4% had children under the age of 18 living with them, 69.7% were married couples living together, 4.0% had a female householder with no husband present, and 20.2% were non-families. 19.2% of all households were made up of individuals, and 8.1% had someone living alone who was 65 years of age or older. The average household size was 2.83 and the average family size was 3.22.

In the township the population was spread out, with 21.2% under the age of 18, 5.1% from 18 to 24, 22.2% from 25 to 44, 14.4% from 45 to 64, and 37.1% who were 65 years of age or older. The median age was 46 years. For every 100 females, there were 74.4 males. For every 100 females age 18 and over, there were 64.2 males.

The median income for a household in the township was $46,250, and the median income for a family was $46,563. Males had a median income of $32,917 versus $21,964 for females. The per capita income for the township was $13,738. About 6.0% of families and 4.3% of the population were below the poverty line, including none of those under age 18 and 10.0% of those age 65 or over.
