= Watson, Minnesota =

City in Minnesota, United States

Watson
- City
- Location of Watson, Minnesota
- Coordinates: 45°00′36″N 95°47′59″W
- Country: United States
- State: Minnesota
- County: Chippewa

Area
  - Total: 0.17 sq mi (0.45 km^{2})
  - Land: 0.17 sq mi (0.45 km^{2})
  - Water: 0 sq mi (0.00 km^{2})
- Elevation: 1,030 ft (310 m)

Population (2020)
  - Total: 182
  - Density: 1,039.8/sq mi (401.47/km^{2})
- Time zone: UTC-6 (Central (CST))
  - Summer (DST): UTC-5 (CDT)
- ZIP code: 56295
- Area code: 320
- FIPS code: 27-68656
- GNIS feature ID: 2397218
- Website: https://www.cityofwatson.com/

Watson is a city in Chippewa County, Minnesota, United States. As of the 2020 census, Watson had a population of 182. Lac qui Parle State Park is nearby.

== History ==
Watson was platted in 1879 when the railroad was extended to that point. The city took its name from the Watson Farmers Elevator, a local grain elevator. A post office has been in operation in Watson since 1879.

In 2024, a Watson man named Joseph M. Rongstad was arrested for threatening to kill University of Minnesota students. Rongstad, who had previously served as mayor of Watson, said he only made the threats because he wanted to talk to the Secret Service.

== Geography ==
According to the United States Census Bureau, the city has a total area of 0.18 square miles (0.47 km^{2}), all land.

U.S. Route 59 and Minnesota State Highway 7 (co-signed) serves as a main route in the community.

Watson is known as "The Goose Capitol of the USA" due to the large number of Canada geese which migrate through and inhabit nearby Lac Qui Parle every fall.

== Demographics ==
Historical population
Census	Pop.	Note	%±
1900	167		—
1910	152		−9.0%
1920	215		41.4%
1930	246		14.4%
1940	290		17.9%
1950	284		−2.1%
1960	267		−6.0%
1970	228		−14.6%
1980	238		4.4%
1990	211		−11.3%
2000	209		−0.9%
2010	205		−1.9%
2020	182		−11.2%
U.S. Decennial Census

=== 2010 census ===
As of the census of 2010, there were 205 people, 90 households, and 50 families residing in the city. The population density was 1,138.9 inhabitants per square mile (439.7/km^{2}). There were 102 housing units at an average density of 566.7 per square mile (218.8/km^{2}). The racial makeup of the city was 98.5% White, 1.0% from other races, and 0.5% from two or more races. Hispanic or Latino of any race were 1.5% of the population.

There were 90 households, of which 31.1% had children under the age of 18 living with them, 43.3% were married couples living together, 5.6% had a female householder with no husband present, 6.7% had a male householder with no wife present, and 44.4% were non-families. 37.8% of all households were made up of individuals, and 12.2% had someone living alone who was 65 years of age or older. The average household size was 2.28 and the average family size was 3.08.

The median age in the city was 41.2 years. 28.3% of residents were under the age of 18; 6.9% were between the ages of 18 and 24; 21.5% were from 25 to 44; 30.8% were from 45 to 64; and 12.7% were 65 years of age or older. The gender makeup of the city was 56.1% male and 43.9% female.

=== 2000 census ===
As of the census of 2000, there were 209 people, 86 households, and 52 families residing in the city. The population density was 1,186.3 inhabitants per square mile (458.0/km^{2}). There were 98 housing units at an average density of 556.3 per square mile (214.8/km^{2}). The racial makeup of the city was 95.69% White, 0.96% Asian, 3.35% from other races. Hispanic or Latino of any race were 3.35% of the population.

There were 86 households, out of which 31.4% had children under the age of 18 living with them, 45.3% were married couples living together, 7.0% had a female householder with no husband present, and 39.5% were non-families. 32.6% of all households were made up of individuals, and 16.3% had someone living alone who was 65 years of age or older. The average household size was 2.43 and the average family size was 3.00.

In the city, the population was spread out, with 28.7% under the age of 18, 7.7% from 18 to 24, 29.2% from 25 to 44, 19.6% from 45 to 64, and 14.8% who were 65 years of age or older. The median age was 37 years. For every 100 females, there were 113.3 males. For every 100 females age 18 and over, there were 109.9 males.

The median income for a household in the city was $34,688, and the median income for a family was $45,000. Males had a median income of $25,781 versus $21,250 for females. The per capita income for the city was $14,617. About 7.1% of families and 13.0% of the population were below the poverty line, including 8.3% of those under the age of eighteen and 32.0% of those 65 or over.
