= Mandt Township, Chippewa County, Minnesota =

Mandt Township, Minnesota
- Township
- Location within the state of Minnesota Mandt Township, Minnesota (the United States)
- Coordinates: 45°6′4″N 95°41′10″W
- Country: United States
- State: Minnesota
- County: Chippewa

Area
  - Total: 35.5 sq mi (92.0 km^{2})
  - Land: 35.5 sq mi (91.9 km^{2})
  - Water: 0.039 sq mi (0.1 km^{2})
- Elevation: 1,030 ft (314 m)

Population (2000)
  - Total: 175
  - Density: 4.9/sq mi (1.9/km^{2})
- Time zone: UTC-6 (Central (CST))
  - Summer (DST): UTC-5 (CDT)
- FIPS code: 27-39752
- GNIS feature ID: 0664887

Mandt Township is a township in Chippewa County, Minnesota, United States. The population was 175 at the 2000 census.

== History ==
Mandt Township was organized in 1876, and named for Engelbreth T. Mandt, a pioneer settler and at whose house the first meeting of the township was held. The original petition requested that the new township be named Moland or Mandt.

== Geography ==
According to the United States Census Bureau, the township has a total area of 35.5 square miles (92.0 km^{2}), of which 35.5 square miles (91.9 km^{2}) is land and 0.04 square mile (0.1 km^{2}) (0.08%) is water.

== Demographics ==
As of the census of 2000, there were 175 people, 74 households, and 58 families residing in the township. The population density was 4.9 inhabitants per square mile (1.9/km^{2}). There were 83 housing units at an average density of 2.3 per square mile (0.89/km^{2}). The racial makeup of the township was 100.00% White.

There were 74 households, out of which 27.0% had children under the age of 18 living with them, 68.9% were married couples living together, 4.1% had a female householder with no husband present, and 21.6% were non-families. 18.9% of all households were made up of individuals, and 10.8% had someone living alone who was 65 years of age or older. The average household size was 2.36 and the average family size was 2.67.

In the township the population was spread out, with 20.6% under the age of 18, 6.9% from 18 to 24, 20.0% from 25 to 44, 25.7% from 45 to 64, and 26.9% who were 65 years of age or older. The median age was 47 years. For every 100 females, there were 124.4 males. For every 100 females age 18 and over, there were 113.8 males.

The median income for a household in the township was $33,125, and the median income for a family was $38,333. Males had a median income of $30,000 versus $18,864 for females. The per capita income for the township was $17,376. About 3.2% of families and 7.3% of the population were below the poverty line, including 20.5% of those under the age of eighteen and 4.3% of those 65 or over.
