= Havelock Township, Chippewa County, Minnesota =

Havelock Township, Minnesota
- Township
- Location within the state of Minnesota Havelock Township, Minnesota (the United States)
- Coordinates: 45°1′42″N 95°32′37″W
- Country: United States
- State: Minnesota
- County: Chippewa

Area
  - Total: 35.8 sq mi (92.6 km^{2})
  - Land: 35.8 sq mi (92.6 km^{2})
  - Water: 0 sq mi (0.0 km^{2})
- Elevation: 1,063 ft (324 m)

Population (2000)
  - Total: 189
  - Density: 5.2/sq mi (2/km^{2})
- Time zone: UTC-6 (Central (CST))
  - Summer (DST): UTC-5 (CDT)
- FIPS code: 27-27656
- GNIS feature ID: 0664415

Havelock Township is a township in Chippewa County, Minnesota, United States. The population was 189 at the 2000 census.

== History ==
Havelock Township was organized in November 10, 1873, and named for Henry Havelock, a British officer. Originally in September 20, 1873, the county board approved a petition to organize it as the Greenfield Township but the order was lost before beginning recorded. The first school in the county was a sod structure built in 1874 and staffed by teacher Mary Nason.

== Geography, ==
According to the United States Census Bureau, the township has a total area of 35.8 square miles (93 km^{2}), all land.

== Demographics ==
As of the census of 2000, there were 189 people, 71 households, and 57 families residing in the township. The population density was 5.3 inhabitants per square mile (2.0/km^{2}). There were 76 housing units at an average density of 2.1 per square mile (0.81/km^{2}). The racial makeup of the township was 98.41% White, 1.59% from other races. Hispanic or Latino of any race were 1.59% of the population.

There were 71 households, out of which 40.8% had children under the age of 18 living with them, 77.5% were married couples living together, 1.4% had a female householder with no husband present, and 19.7% were non-families. 16.9% of all households were made up of individuals, and 7.0% had someone living alone who was 65 years of age or older. The average household size was 2.66 and the average family size was 3.02.

In the township the population was spread out, with 25.4% under the age of 18, 5.3% from 18 to 24, 26.5% from 25 to 44, 26.5% from 45 to 64, and 16.4% who were 65 years of age or older. The median age was 43 years. For every 100 females, there were 98.9 males. For every 100 females age 18 and over, there were 98.6 males.

The median income for a household in the township was $42,500, and the median income for a family was $47,083. Males had a median income of $26,250 versus $20,000 for females. The per capita income for the township was $17,012. About 4.9% of families and 7.5% of the population were below the poverty line, including 11.4% of those under the age of eighteen and none of those 65 or over.
