= Stoneham Township, Chippewa County, Minnesota =

Stoneham Township, Minnesota
- Township
- Location within the state of Minnesota Stoneham Township, Minnesota (the United States)
- Coordinates: 44°55′19″N 95°26′11″W
- Country: United States
- State: Minnesota
- County: Chippewa

Area
  - Total: 34.8 sq mi (90.1 km^{2})
  - Land: 34.7 sq mi (90.0 km^{2})
  - Water: 0.039 sq mi (0.1 km^{2})
- Elevation: 1,050 ft (320 m)

Population (2000)
  - Total: 260
  - Density: 7.5/sq mi (2.9/km^{2})
- Time zone: UTC-6 (Central (CST))
  - Summer (DST): UTC-5 (CDT)
- FIPS code: 27-62950
- GNIS feature ID: 0665717

Stoneham Township is a township in Chippewa County, Minnesota, United States. The population was 260 at the 2000 census.

== History ==
Stoneham Township was organized in 1880, and was so named from the fact one settler hailed from Stoneham, Massachusetts, and another settler had the surname Stone.

== Geography ==
According to the United States Census Bureau, the township has a total area of 34.8 square miles (90.1 km^{2}), of which 34.7 square miles (90.0 km^{2}) is land and 0.04 square miles (0.1 km^{2}) (0.12%) is water.

== Demographics ==
At the 2000 census, there were 260 people, 86 households and 74 families residing in the township. The population density was 7.5 per square mile (2.9/km^{2}). There were 96 housing units at an average density of 2.8/sq mi (1.1/km^{2}). The racial makeup of the township was 99.23% White, 0.77% from other races. Hispanic or Latino of any race were 1.92% of the population.

There were 86 households, of which 41.9% had children under the age of 18 living with them, 80.2% were married couples living together, 3.5% had a female householder with no husband present, and 12.8% were non-families. 8.1% of all households were made up of individuals, and 3.5% had someone living alone who was 65 years of age or older. The average household size was 3.02 and the average family size was 3.27.

28.5% of the population were under the age of 18, 7.7% from 18 to 24, 26.9% from 25 to 44, 23.8% from 45 to 64, and 13.1% who were 65 years of age or older. The median age was 38 years. For every 100 females, there were 116.7 males. For every 100 females age 18 and over, there were 111.4 males.

The median household income was $38,500 and the median family income was $43,750. Males had a median income of $26,250 versus $25,313 for females. The per capita income for the township was $16,581. About 5.6% of families and 6.7% of the population were below the poverty line, including 7.7% of those under the age of eighteen and 18.6% of those 65 or over.
