= Tunsberg Township, Chippewa County, Minnesota =

Tunsberg Township, Minnesota
- Township
- Location within the state of Minnesota Tunsberg Township, Minnesota (the United States)
- Coordinates: 45°1′56″N 95°47′22″W
- Country: United States
- State: Minnesota
- County: Chippewa

Area
  - Total: 33.3 sq mi (86.2 km^{2})
  - Land: 33.0 sq mi (85.5 km^{2})
  - Water: 0.27 sq mi (0.7 km^{2})
- Elevation: 948 ft (289 m)

Population (2000)
  - Total: 183
  - Density: 5.4/sq mi (2.1/km^{2})
- Time zone: UTC-6 (Central (CST))
  - Summer (DST): UTC-5 (CDT)
- FIPS code: 27-65704
- GNIS feature ID: 0665816

Tunsberg Township is a township in Chippewa County, Minnesota, United States. The population was 183 at the 2000 census.

== History ==
Tunsberg Township was organized in 1870. According to Warren Upham, the name is probably Norwegian in origin.

== Geography ==
According to the United States Census Bureau, the township has a total area of 33.3 square miles (86.2 km^{2}), of which 33.0 square miles (85.5 km^{2}) is land and 0.3 square mile (0.7 km^{2}) (0.84%) is water.

== Demographics ==
As of the census of 2000, there were 183 people, 68 households, and 59 families residing in the township. The population density was 5.5 people per square mile (2.1/km^{2}). There were 75 housing units at an average density of 2.3/sq mi (0.9/km^{2}). The racial makeup of the township was 98.91% White, 0.55% Asian, and 0.55% from two or more races.

There were 68 households, out of which 36.8% had children under the age of 18 living with them, 82.4% were married couples living together, 4.4% had a female householder with no husband present, and 11.8% were non-families. 10.3% of all households were made up of individuals, and 1.5% had someone living alone who was 65 years of age or older. The average household size was 2.69 and the average family size was 2.87.

In the township the population was spread out, with 25.1% under the age of 18, 6.0% from 18 to 24, 20.8% from 25 to 44, 33.9% from 45 to 64, and 14.2% who were 65 years of age or older. The median age was 44 years. For every 100 females, there were 105.6 males. For every 100 females age 18 and over, there were 98.6 males.

The median income for a household in the township was $55,417, and the median income for a family was $52,222. Males had a median income of $36,250 versus $21,563 for females. The per capita income for the township was $24,303. None of the population or families were below the poverty line.
