= Asbury College =

Asbury College may refer to:

- Asbury College (Maryland), a former Methodist college in Baltimore, Maryland
- Asbury University, a liberal arts school in Wilmore, Kentucky, formerly known as Asbury College
- DePauw University, a liberal arts college in Greencastle, Indiana, formerly known as Indiana Asbury College or Asbury College

== See also ==
- Ashbury College, Ottawa, Ontario, Canada
