= Shible Township, Swift County, Minnesota =

Shible Township, Minnesota
- Township
- Location within the state of Minnesota Shible Township, Minnesota (the United States)
- Coordinates: 45°17′16″N 96°3′43″W
- Country: United States
- State: Minnesota
- County: Swift

Area
  - Total: 36.0 sq mi (93.2 km^{2})
  - Land: 34.9 sq mi (90.5 km^{2})
  - Water: 1.0 sq mi (2.7 km^{2})
- Elevation: 1,037 ft (316 m)

Population (2000)
  - Total: 115
  - Density: 3.4/sq mi (1.3/km^{2})
- Time zone: UTC-6 (Central (CST))
  - Summer (DST): UTC-5 (CDT)
- FIPS code: 27-59818
- GNIS feature ID: 0665599

Shible Township is a township in Swift County, Minnesota, United States. The population was 115 at the 2000 census.

Shible Township was organized in 1876, and named for Albert Shible, a pioneer settler.

== Geography ==
According to the United States Census Bureau, the township has a total area of 36.0 square miles (93.2 km^{2}), of which 34.9 square miles (90.5 km^{2}) is land and 1.0 square mile (2.7 km^{2}) (2.86%) is water.

== Demographics ==
As of the census of 2000, there were 115 people, 54 households, and 38 families residing in the township. The population density was 3.3 people per square mile (1.3/km^{2}). There were 67 housing units at an average density of 1.9/sq mi (0.7/km^{2}). The racial makeup of the township was 99.13% White, 0.87% from other races. Hispanic or Latino of any race were 0.87% of the population.

There were 54 households, out of which 20.4% had children under the age of 18 living with them, 61.1% were married couples living together, 3.7% had a female householder with no husband present, and 27.8% were non-families. 25.9% of all households were made up of individuals, and 7.4% had someone living alone who was 65 years of age or older. The average household size was 2.13 and the average family size was 2.51.

In the township the population was spread out, with 17.4% under the age of 18, 3.5% from 18 to 24, 21.7% from 25 to 44, 40.0% from 45 to 64, and 17.4% who were 65 years of age or older. The median age was 49 years. For every 100 females, there were 134.7 males. For every 100 females age 18 and over, there were 126.2 males.

The median income for a household in the township was $35,625, and the median income for a family was $35,938. Males had a median income of $34,375 versus $16,875 for females. The per capita income for the township was $17,639. There were no families and 3.0% of the population living below the poverty line, including no under eighteens and none of those over 64.
