= Asbury, Minnesota =

Unincorporated community in Minnesota, US

Asbury
- Unincorporated community
- Location within Minnesota Location within the United States
- Coordinates: 44°52′44″N 95°32′02″W
- Country: United States
- State: Minnesota
- County: Chippewa
- Elevation: 1,047 ft (319 m)
- Time zone: UTC-6 (Central (CST))
  - Summer (DST): UTC-5 (CDT)
- Area code: 320
- GNIS feature ID: 654576

Asbury is an unincorporated community in Chippewa County, in the U.S. state of Minnesota.

== History ==
The community was named for Francis Asbury, a religious leader in the Second Great Awakening.
