= Grace Township, Chippewa County, Minnesota =

Grace Township, Minnesota
- Township
- Location within the state of Minnesota Grace Township, Minnesota (the United States)
- Coordinates: 45°6′55″N 95°32′37″W
- Country: United States
- State: Minnesota
- County: Chippewa

Area
  - Total: 35.9 sq mi (92.9 km^{2})
  - Land: 35.9 sq mi (92.9 km^{2})
  - Water: 0.039 sq mi (0.1 km^{2})
- Elevation: 1,043 ft (318 m)

Population (2000)
  - Total: 134
  - Density: 3.6/sq mi (1.4/km^{2})
- Time zone: UTC-6 (Central (CST))
  - Summer (DST): UTC-5 (CDT)
- FIPS code: 27-24722
- GNIS feature ID: 0664303

Grace Township is a township in Chippewa County, Minnesota, United States. The population was 134 at the 2000 census.

== History ==
Grace Township was organized in 1880, and named for Grace Whittemore, the daughter of an early settler.

== Geography ==
According to the United States Census Bureau, the township has a total area of 35.9 square miles (93 km^{2}), of which 35.8 square miles (93 km^{2}) is land and 0.04 square miles (0.10 km^{2}) (0.06%) is water.

== Demographics ==
As of the census of 2000, there were 134 people, 50 households, and 39 families residing in the township. The population density was 3.7 inhabitants per square mile (1.4/km^{2}). There were 55 housing units at an average density of 1.5 per square mile (0.58/km^{2}). The racial makeup of the township was 93.28% White, 0.75% Native American, 0.75% Asian, 2.99% from other races, and 2.24% from two or more races. Hispanic or Latino of any race were 3.73% of the population.

There were 50 households, out of which 34.0% had children under the age of 18 living with them, 68.0% were married couples living together, and 22.0% were non-families. 20.0% of all households were made up of individuals, and 12.0% had someone living alone who was 65 years of age or older. The average household size was 2.68 and the average family size was 3.13.

In the township the population was spread out, with 24.6% under the age of 18, 7.5% from 18 to 24, 25.4% from 25 to 44, 29.1% from 45 to 64, and 13.4% who were 65 years of age or older. The median age was 40 years. For every 100 females, there were 123.3 males. For every 100 females age 18 and over, there were 140.5 males.

The median income for a household in the township was $61,667, and the median income for a family was $66,250. Males had a median income of $42,500 versus $31,250 for females. The per capita income for the township was $19,552. There were 3.1% of families and 8.5% of the population living below the poverty line, including 14.7% of under eighteens and 8.3% of those over 64.
