= Louisville National Medical College =

Black medical school in the United States

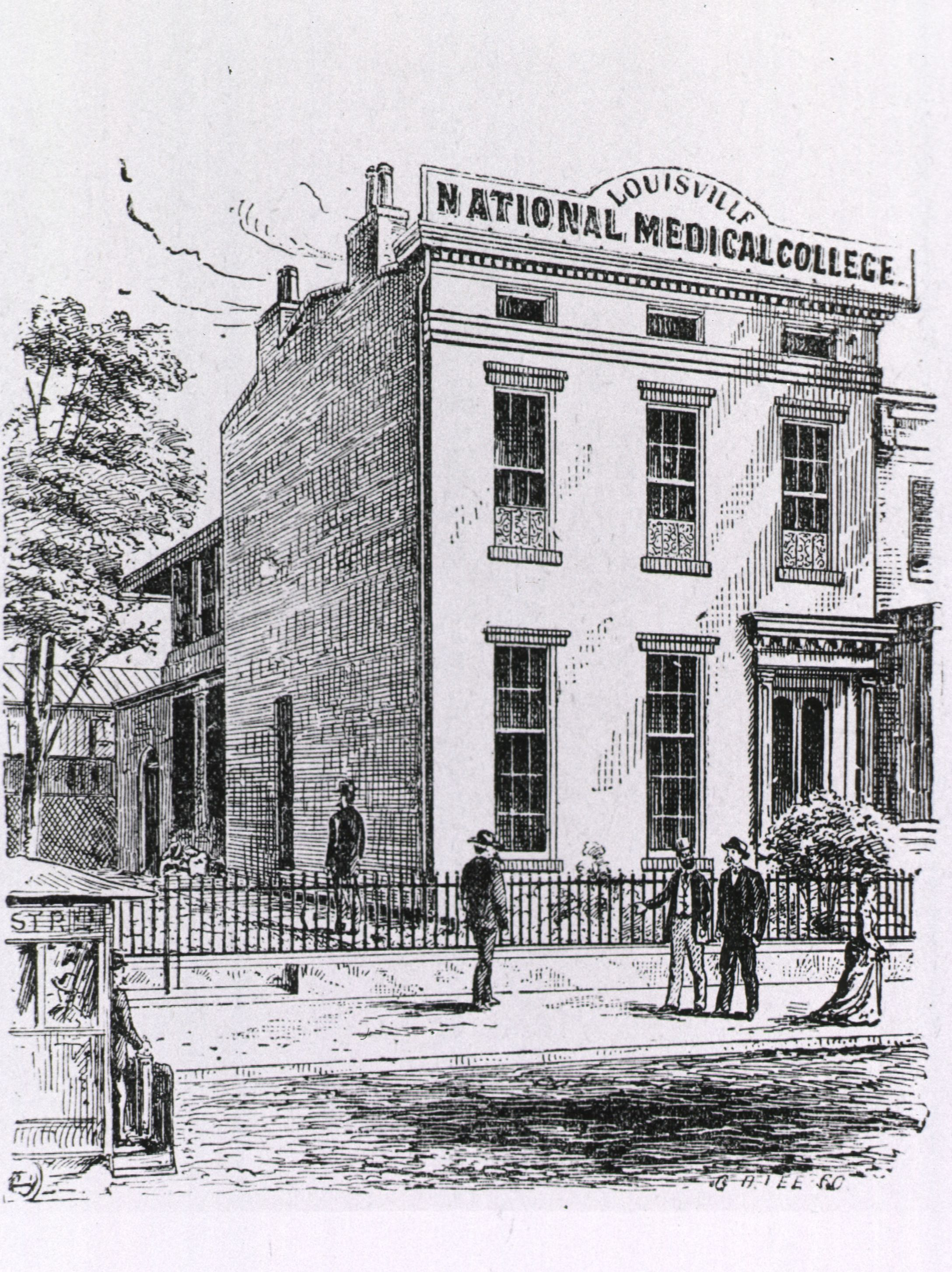
- Type: Historically Black medical school
- Active: 1888–1912
- Founders: William Henry Fitzbutler, Sarah McCurdy Fitzbutler
- Affiliations: Simmons University
- Location: Louisville, Kentucky, U.S. 38°15′22″N 85°45′05″W

Louisville National Medical College (1888–1912), was a historically Black medical school in the United States, located in Louisville, Kentucky. At the time it was founded, there were four other medical schools in Louisville. The first graduate of the medical school was a woman.

== History ==
Louisville National Medical College obtained a charter from the Kentucky state legislature in 1888 because none of the other four medical schools located in Louisville accepted Black students. The medical school was founded by Dr. William Henry Fitzbutler (1842–1901), the first African American medical school graduate from the University of Michigan School of Medicine and the Detroit Medical College (today the Wayne State University School of Medicine). Fitzbutler's wife, Sarah Helen McCurdy, was the medical school's first woman graduate. Fitzbutler was the medical college's Dean, Chair of Surgery, and Chair of Materia Medica. The medical college was co-founded by W. A. Burney. Rufus Conrad operated the medical college after Fitzbutler died in 1901.

According to the Flexner Report, the medical school was the cleanest and best run in the country; however, the same report also described it as "ineffectual", and wrote that "the negro must be educated not just for his sake, but ours".

Initially, lectures were held at the United Brothers of Friendship Hall on Ninth and Magazine Streets (building no longer exists), later moving to Green Street (later renamed Liberty Street).

The medical school operated its own hospital, Louisville Hospital, located next to the school on Madison Street in Louisville, Kentucky. The medical school graduated 175 African American medical students. Conflicting reports are that 150 graduated.

The medical school merged with Simmons University in 1907 and closed in 1912. The Louisville Hospital did not close in 1912 but was renamed Simmons Nursing Department.

== Founders ==
The medical college was founded by William Henry Fitzbutler and his wife Sarah McCurdy Fitzbutler. At a young age, Fitzbutler excelled at academics and was intrigued in medicine. He gained inspiration from different books about medicine and after marrying Sarah McCurdy, became the first African-American graduate of the Detroit Medical College. He continued at the University of Michigan School of Medicine. Afterwards, he moved to Louisville with his wife and children.

Louisville had no African-American physicians but there were lots of African-Americans that could not be served. Therefore, he thrived as the first African-American physician at Louisville. Advocating for equality in many other aspects of his life, Fitzbutler secured approval to organize a medical school which would accept African-Americans, the Louisville National Medical College. It became the best African-American medical college and was also entirely owned and operated only by African Americans. His wife, Sarah, attended this school and became the first graduate. After Henry died, she continued leadership in the Louisville National Medical College until its closure in 1912. Although they left a legacy in the medicine field for African-Americans, they still endured many hardships many of which stemmed from racism. Nonetheless, both partners became crucial in creating an influential and creative community that forces for progress, education, human rights, and medical care for all. They left a legacy in the medicine field for African-Americans.

== Outcome ==
The medical college was beneficial in accelerating progress toward the achievement of healthcare for African Americans. It served as the catalyst for the other medical colleges that opened up for African-Americans in Louisville.
