= Crate Township, Chippewa County, Minnesota =

Crate Township, Minnesota
- Township
- Location within the state of Minnesota Crate Township, Minnesota (the United States)
- Coordinates: 45°1′0″N 95°26′13″W
- Country: United States
- State: Minnesota
- County: Chippewa

Area
  - Total: 35.9 sq mi (92.9 km^{2})
  - Land: 35.9 sq mi (92.9 km^{2})
  - Water: 0 sq mi (0.0 km^{2})
- Elevation: 1,050 ft (320 m)

Population (2000)
  - Total: 247
  - Density: 7.0/sq mi (2.7/km^{2})
- Time zone: UTC-6 (Central (CST))
  - Summer (DST): UTC-5 (CDT)
- FIPS code: 27-13672
- GNIS feature ID: 0663885

Crate Township is a township in Chippewa County, Minnesota, United States. The population was 247 at the 2000 census. Crate Township was named for Francis Lucretius "Crate" Beasley, an early settler.

== Geography ==
According to the United States Census Bureau, the township has a total area of 35.9 square miles (93 km^{2}), of which 35.8 square miles (93 km^{2}) is land and 0.03% is water.

== Demographics ==
As of the census of 2000, there were 247 people, 84 households, and 67 families residing in the township. The population density was 6.9 inhabitants per square mile (2.7/km^{2}). There were 102 housing units at an average density of 2.8 per square mile (1.1/km^{2}). The racial makeup of the township was 98.38% White, 1.21% Native American, and 0.40% from two or more races.

There were 84 households, out of which 45.2% had children under the age of 18 living with them, 73.8% were married couples living together, 4.8% had a female householder with no husband present, and 20.2% were non-families. 19.0% of all households were made up of individuals, and 6.0% had someone living alone who was 65 years of age or older. The average household size was 2.94 and the average family size was 3.39.

In the township the population was spread out, with 33.2% under the age of 18, 5.7% from 18 to 24, 30.8% from 25 to 44, 19.8% from 45 to 64, and 10.5% who were 65 years of age or older. The median age was 35 years. For every 100 females, there were 100.8 males. For every 100 females age 18 and over, there were 114.3 males.

The median income for a household in the township was $40,000, and the median income for a family was $42,386. Males had a median income of $21,607 versus $25,313 for females. The per capita income for the township was $16,532. About 1.4% of families and 3.1% of the population were below the poverty line, including 7.9% of those under the age of eighteen and none of those 65 or over.
