= Lac qui Parle =

Lake in Minnesota, U.S.

- Bde Iyedaƞ (Dakota)
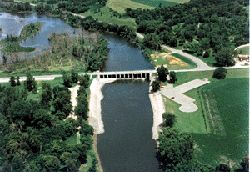
- Dam located on the southern tip. Source: US Army Corps of Engineers

- Location within Minnesota Location within the United States
- Location: Chippewa County, Lac qui Parle County and Swift County, Minnesota United States
- Coordinates: 45°6′N 95°59′W
- Type: reservoir
- Primary inflows: Minnesota River
- Primary outflows: Minnesota River
- Basin countries: United States

Lac qui Parle is a lake located in western Minnesota, United States, which was widened by the damming of the Minnesota River. The dam was built by the Works Progress Administration (WPA) in 1939. It was reconstructed in 1996. "Lac qui Parle" is a French translation of the native Dakota name, Bde Iyedaƞ, meaning "lake which speaks".

The northernmost point of the lake is about 3 miles southeast of the city of Appleton. The lake flows 10 miles southeast to the dam, which is about 4 miles to the west of the town of Watson.

Lac qui Parle State Park is located on the southern portion of the lake. Lac qui Parle serves as a temporary home of thousands of migratory Canada geese and other waterfowl.

== See also ==
- List of Minnesota place names of Native American origin
