= Chippewa County, Minnesota =

County in Minnesota, United States

- County
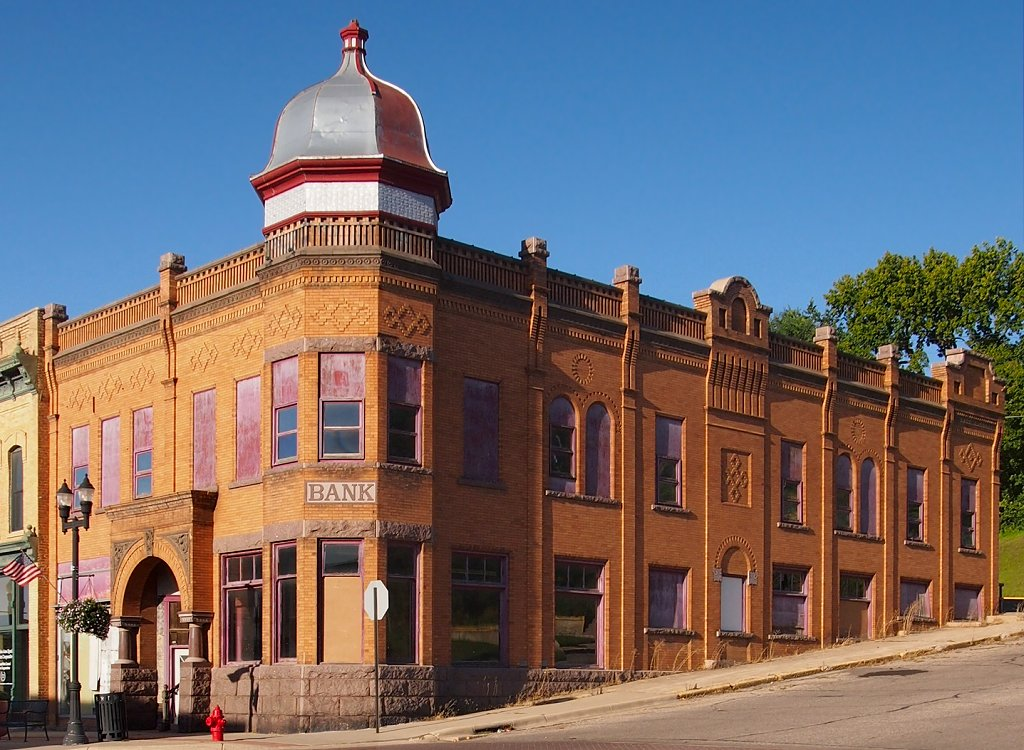
- Chippewa County Bank in Montevideo.

- Location within the U.S. state of Minnesota
- Coordinates: 45°02′N 95°34′W
- Country: United States
- State: Minnesota
- Created: February 20, 1862
- Organized: 1868
- Named for: Chippewa River
- Seat: Montevideo
- Largest city: Montevideo

Area
  - Total: 588 sq mi (1,520 km^{2})
  - Land: 581 sq mi (1,500 km^{2})
  - Water: 6.7 sq mi (17 km^{2}) 1.1%

Population (2020)
  - Total: 12,598
  - Estimate (2025): 12,406 ▼
  - Density: 21.7/sq mi (8.4/km^{2})
- Time zone: UTC−6 (Central)
  - Summer (DST): UTC−5 (CDT)
- Congressional district: 7th
- Website: www.chippewacountymn.gov

Chippewa County (/ˈtʃɪpəˌwɑː/ CHIP-ə-WAH) is a county in the U.S. state of Minnesota. As of the 2020 census, the population was 12,598. Its county seat is Montevideo. The county was formed in 1862, and was organized in 1868.

== History ==
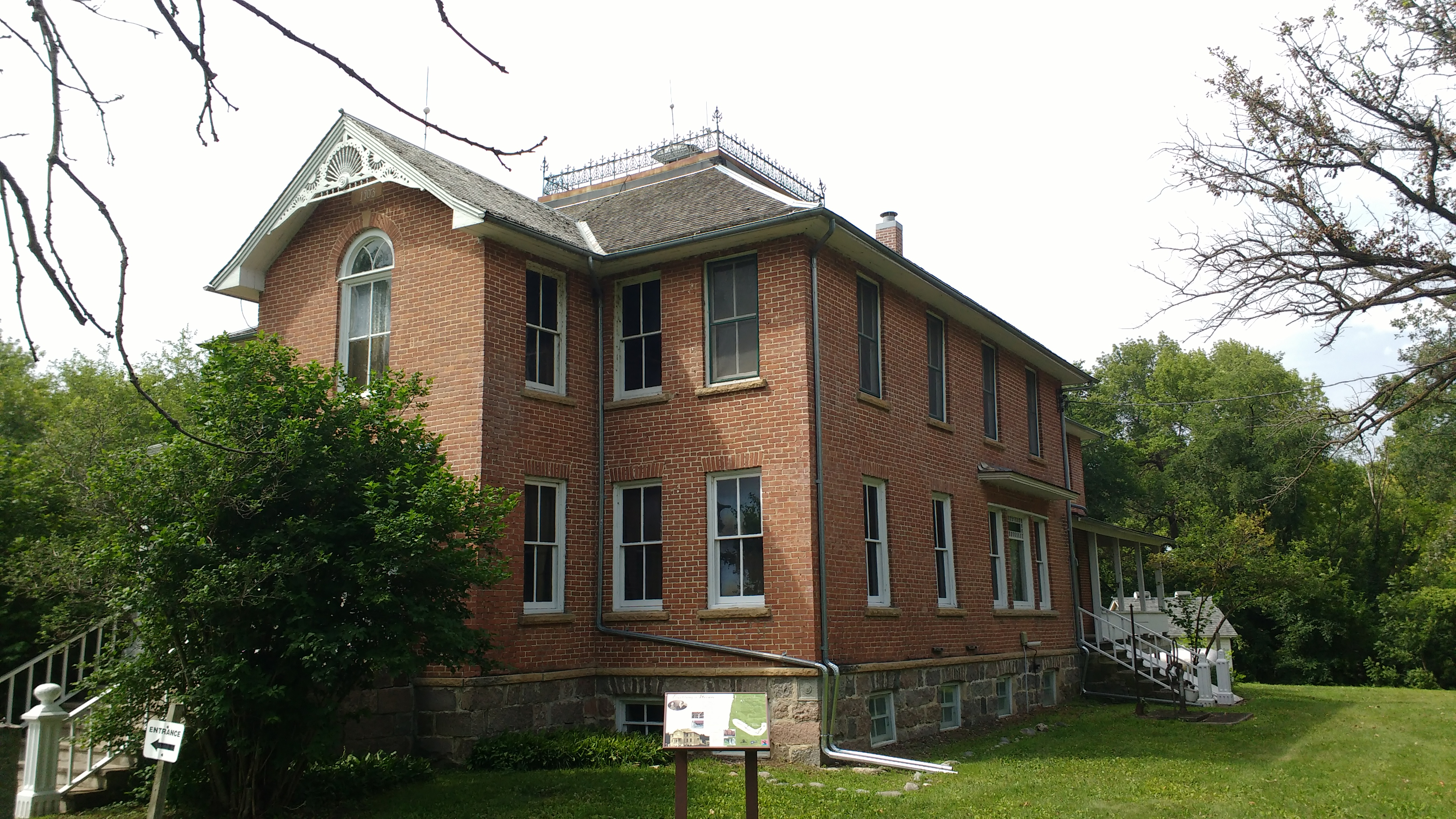
Swensson Farm Museum

Chippewa County was organized on March 5, 1868, after having been part of Renville County. The northern boundary change separating it from Swift County led to reorganization on February 18, 1870. The first three county commissioners, appointed by the governor, were Daniel S. Wilkins, Ole Thorson and M. Davidson. The county commissioners first met at Wilkins's cabin on January 9, 1869. Wilkins was appointed chairman of the board. The first officers appointed were J.D. Baker as auditor; J.C. Eldred as register of deeds; Samuel J. Sargant as treasurer; George W. Daniels as judge of probate; Edward Alcorn as sheriff; J.D. Baker as superintendent of schools; Horace W. Griggs as coroner; George W. Frink as justice of the peace; and F.W. Palmer and M. Morris as constables.

=== County seat ===
Chippewa City was the first village to be laid out in Chippewa County. It was on the west side of the Chippewa River, just north of the confluence with the Minnesota River. Daniel S. Wilkins was the first settler to arrive in 1865, and he laid out Chippewa City in autumn 1868. Wilkins's cabin there was the location of the first county commissioners' meeting.

George W. Frink arrived in Chippewa County in 1867 and made claim to land on the east side of the Chippewa River, where he built a log house in Montevideo. With towns on both sides of the river, there was debate over which should be the county seat. L. R. Moyer reported that some men from Montevideo went to Chippewa City and took the county records, "lock, stock and barrel". They also stole the post office, and G. W. Fink was named postmaster. The state of Minnesota legalized the move and Montevideo remains the county seat.

== Geography ==
Soils of Chippewa County

The upper part of the county's western boundary is formed by the outline of Lac qui Parle reservoir, which was formed when the Minnesota River was dammed in 1939. The Minnesota River flows southeast from the lake, along the county's southwestern border, while the Chippewa River flows south through the western part of the county to discharge into the Minnesota at the county's southern border. The Dry Weather Creek drains the west-central part of the county into the Chippewa, while the Palmer Creek drains the lower central part of the county into the Minnesota near the county's southernmost point. The county terrain consists of low rolling hills, devoted to agriculture. The terrain generally slopes to the south, and locally to the river valleys. The county's highest point is near its southeastern corner, section 23 of Rheiderland Township, at 1,142 ft (348 m) The county has a total area of 588 square miles (1,520 km^{2}), of which 581 square miles (1,500 km^{2}) is land and 6.7 square miles (17 km^{2}) (1.1%) is water.

=== Lakes ===
- Carlton Lake
- Long Lake
- Norboro Lake
- Round Lake
- Shakopee Lake
- Watson Sag

=== Major highways ===
- U.S. Highway 59
- U.S. Highway 212
- Minnesota State Highway 7
- Minnesota State Highway 23
- Minnesota State Highway 29
- Minnesota State Highway 40

=== Adjacent counties ===
- Swift County - north
- Kandiyohi County - northeast
- Renville County - southeast
- Yellow Medicine County - southwest
- Lac qui Parle County - west

=== Protected areas ===
- Boike State Wildlife Management Area
- Franko State Wildlife Management Area
- Gneiss Outcrops Scientific and Natural Area
- Minnesota River Valley Overlook
- Spartan State Wildlife Management Area

== Climate and weather ==
Montevideo, Minnesota

Climate chart (precipitation, max. and min. temperature)
J	F	M	A	M	J	J	A	S	O	N	D
0.9 22 2	1 27 7	1.8 39 19	2.5 56 33	3 69 46	4.2 78 56	3.7 83 61	3.4 81 58	3.3 72 48	2.3 59 35	1.7 41 21	0.9 25 7
- █ Average max. and min. temperatures in °F
- █ Precipitation totals in inches
- Source: The Weather Channel
Metric conversion
J	F	M	A	M	J	J	A	S	O	N	D
22 −6 −17	26 −3 −14	46 4 −7	64 13 1	77 21 8	108 26 13	93 28 16	86 27 14	83 22 9	59 15 2	43 5 −6	22 −4 −14
- █ Average max. and min. temperatures in °C
- █ Precipitation totals in mm

In recent years, average temperatures in the county seat of Montevideo have ranged from a low of 2 °F (−17 °C) in January to a high of 83 °F (28 °C) in July, although a record low of −37 °F (−38 °C) was recorded in January 1970 and a record high of 110 °F (43 °C) was recorded in July 1988. Average monthly precipitation ranged from 0.86 inches (22 mm) in December to 4.24 inches (108 mm) in June.

== Demographics ==
Historical population
Census	Pop.	Note	%±
1870	1,467		—
1880	5,408		268.6%
1890	8,555		58.2%
1900	12,499		46.1%
1910	13,458		7.7%
1920	15,720		16.8%
1930	15,762		0.3%
1940	16,927		7.4%
1950	16,739		−1.1%
1960	16,320		−2.5%
1970	15,109		−7.4%
1980	14,941		−1.1%
1990	13,228		−11.5%
2000	13,088		−1.1%
2010	12,441		−4.9%
2020	12,598		1.3%
2025 (est.)	12,406	▼	−1.5%
U.S. Decennial Census; 1790-1960 1900-1990; 1990-2000 2010-2020

=== 2020 census ===
As of the 2020 census, the county had a population of 12,598. The median age was 41.1 years. 23.9% of residents were under the age of 18 and 21.8% of residents were 65 years of age or older. For every 100 females there were 99.8 males, and for every 100 females age 18 and over there were 99.3 males age 18 and over.

The racial makeup of the county was 84.6% White, 0.6% Black or African American, 1.0% American Indian and Alaska Native, 0.4% Asian, 2.3% Native Hawaiian and Pacific Islander, 6.2% from some other race, and 4.9% from two or more races. Hispanic or Latino residents of any race comprised 9.9% of the population.

42.8% of residents lived in urban areas, while 57.2% lived in rural areas.

There were 5,150 households in the county, of which 28.8% had children under the age of 18 living in them. Of all households, 50.0% were married-couple households, 19.2% were households with a male householder and no spouse or partner present, and 23.2% were households with a female householder and no spouse or partner present. About 30.1% of all households were made up of individuals and 14.8% had someone living alone who was 65 years of age or older.

There were 5,627 housing units, of which 8.5% were vacant. Among occupied housing units, 72.3% were owner-occupied and 27.7% were renter-occupied. The homeowner vacancy rate was 2.0% and the rental vacancy rate was 6.9%.

=== Racial and ethnic composition ===
Chippewa County, Minnesota – Racial and ethnic composition Note: the US Census treats Hispanic/Latino as an ethnic category. This table excludes Latinos from the racial categories and assigns them to a separate category. Hispanics/Latinos may be of any race.
Race / Ethnicity (NH = Non-Hispanic)	Pop 1980	Pop 1990	Pop 2000	Pop 2010	Pop 2020	% 1980	% 1990	% 2000	% 2010	% 2020
White alone (NH)	14,742	13,063	12,550	11,370	10,473	98.67%	98.75%	95.89%	91.39%	83.13%
Black or African American alone (NH)	3	5	21	65	75	0.02%	0.04%	0.16%	0.52%	0.60%
Native American or Alaska Native alone (NH)	25	23	124	116	102	0.17%	0.17%	0.95%	0.93%	0.81%
Asian alone (NH)	73	43	39	57	44	0.49%	0.33%	0.30%	0.46%	0.35%
Native Hawaiian or Pacific Islander alone (NH)	x	x	3	97	296	x	x	0.02%	0.78%	2.35%
Other race alone (NH)	7	0	7	2	49	0.05%	0.00%	0.05%	0.02%	0.39%
Mixed race or Multiracial (NH)	x	x	93	123	316	x	x	0.71%	0.99%	2.51%
Hispanic or Latino (any race)	91	94	251	611	1,243	0.61%	0.71%	1.92%	4.91%	9.87%
Total	14,941	13,228	13,088	12,441	12,598	100.00%	100.00%	100.00%	100.00%	100.00%

=== 2000 census ===
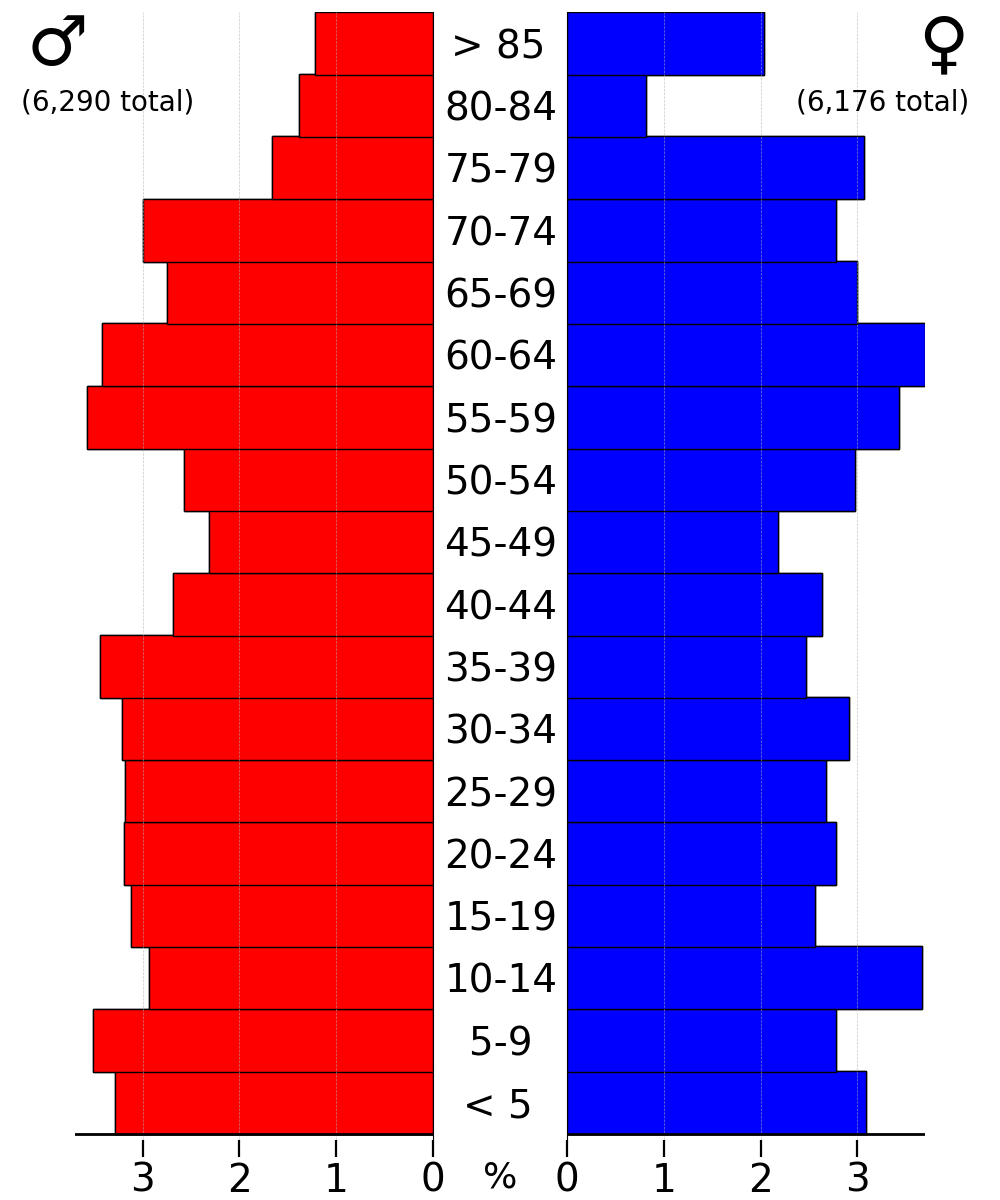
2022 US Census population pyramid for Chippewa County, from ACS 5-year estimates

As of the census of 2000, there were 13,088 people, 5,361 households, and 3,597 families in the county. The population density was 22.5 per square mile (8.7/km^{2}). There were 5,855 housing units at an average density of 10.1 per square mile (3.9/km^{2}). The racial makeup of the county was 96.78% White, 0.18% Black or African American, 1.00% Native American, 0.30% Asian, 0.02% Pacific Islander, 0.94% from other races, and 0.79% from two or more races. 1.92% of the population were Hispanic or Latino of any race. 37.8% were of Norwegian and 36.8% German ancestry.

There were 5,361 households, out of which 31.20% had children under the age of 18 living with them, 57.00% were married couples living together, 6.60% had a female householder with no husband present, and 32.90% were non-families. 29.50% of all households were made up of individuals, and 15.70% had someone living alone who was 65 years of age or older. The average household size was 2.39 and the average family size was 2.96.

The county population contained 25.40% under the age of 18, 7.10% from 18 to 24, 24.50% from 25 to 44, 23.00% from 45 to 64, and 20.00% who were 65 years of age or older. The median age was 40 years. For every 100 females there were 94.80 males. For every 100 females age 18 and over, there were 91.30 males.

The median income for a household in the county was $35,582, and the median income for a family was $45,160. Males had a median income of $30,556 versus $20,384 for females. The per capita income for the county was $18,039. About 4.80% of families and 8.60% of the population were below the poverty line, including 9.80% of those under age 18 and 9.30% of those age 65 or over.

== Communities ==
=== Cities ===
- Clara City
- Granite Falls (partial)
- Maynard
- Milan
- Montevideo (county seat)
- Watson

=== Unincorporated communities ===
- Asbury
- Big Bend City
- Bunde
- Churchill
- Gluek
- Gracelock
- Hagan
- Louriston
- Wegdahl

=== Townships ===
- Big Bend Township
- Crate Township
- Grace Township
- Granite Falls Township
- Havelock Township
- Kragero Township
- Leenthrop Township
- Lone Tree Township
- Louriston Township
- Mandt Township
- Rheiderland Township
- Rosewood Township
- Sparta Township
- Stoneham Township
- Tunsberg Township
- Woods Township

== Government and politics ==
Chippewa County voters have been fairly split in recent decades. As of 2024 the county has selected both the Democratic and Republican nominee in 6 of 12 presidential elections since 1980. Donald Trump was the first Republican nominee to win the county since George W. Bush in 2000, receiving 60.5% of the vote. He increased his share in both 2020 and 2024, the best Republican performances in the county since 1920.

United States presidential election results for Chippewa County, Minnesota
Year	Republican		Democratic		Third party(ies)	
Year	No.	%	No.	%	No.	%
1892	730	44.51%	507	30.91%	403	24.57%
1896	1,310	54.61%	1,037	43.23%	52	2.17%
1900	1,432	63.70%	707	31.45%	109	4.85%
1904	1,830	79.60%	338	14.70%	131	5.70%
1908	1,409	58.98%	799	33.44%	181	7.58%
1912	412	15.48%	870	32.68%	1,380	51.84%
1916	1,311	46.79%	1,134	40.47%	357	12.74%
1920	3,532	69.75%	960	18.96%	572	11.30%
1924	2,140	42.29%	140	2.77%	2,780	54.94%
1928	3,547	62.77%	2,032	35.96%	72	1.27%
1932	1,940	32.41%	3,888	64.95%	158	2.64%
1936	2,223	33.89%	4,027	61.40%	309	4.71%
1940	3,307	45.05%	3,969	54.07%	64	0.87%
1944	2,967	47.25%	3,264	51.98%	48	0.76%
1948	2,569	38.65%	3,888	58.50%	189	2.84%
1952	4,411	57.90%	3,171	41.63%	36	0.47%
1956	3,623	51.32%	3,434	48.64%	3	0.04%
1960	3,915	51.69%	3,643	48.10%	16	0.21%
1964	2,806	38.10%	4,550	61.78%	9	0.12%
1968	3,195	44.70%	3,701	51.78%	251	3.51%
1972	3,787	50.18%	3,630	48.10%	130	1.72%
1976	3,254	40.44%	4,648	57.77%	144	1.79%
1980	4,252	52.51%	3,164	39.08%	681	8.41%
1984	3,964	55.95%	3,047	43.01%	74	1.04%
1988	3,190	48.97%	3,238	49.71%	86	1.32%
1992	2,143	32.39%	2,929	44.26%	1,545	23.35%
1996	2,119	34.60%	3,178	51.89%	827	13.50%
2000	2,977	46.87%	2,952	46.47%	423	6.66%
2004	3,089	46.76%	3,424	51.83%	93	1.41%
2008	2,907	45.74%	3,280	51.60%	169	2.66%
2012	2,967	47.85%	3,083	49.72%	151	2.44%
2016	3,764	60.50%	1,978	31.79%	480	7.71%
2020	4,250	64.29%	2,226	33.67%	135	2.04%
2024	4,175	66.08%	2,026	32.07%	117	1.85%

presidential County Board of Commissioners
Position	Name	District
Commissioner	Matt Gilbertson	District 1
Commissioner	Candice Jaenisch	District 2
Commissioner	David Nordaune	District 3
Commissioner	Bill Pauling	District 4
Commissioner	David Lieser	District 5

State Legislature (2021-2023)
Position	Name	Affiliation	District
Senate	Andrew Lang	Republican	District 17
House of Representatives	Tim Miller	Republican	District 17A

U.S Congress (2021-2023)
Position	Name	Affiliation	District
House of Representatives	Michelle Fischbach	Republican	7th
Senate	Amy Klobuchar	Democrat	N/A
Senate	Tina Smith	Democrat	N/A

== See also ==
- National Register of Historic Places listings in Chippewa County, Minnesota
- List of Minnesota placenames of Native American origin
