= Clara City, Minnesota =

City in Minnesota, United States

Clara City
- City
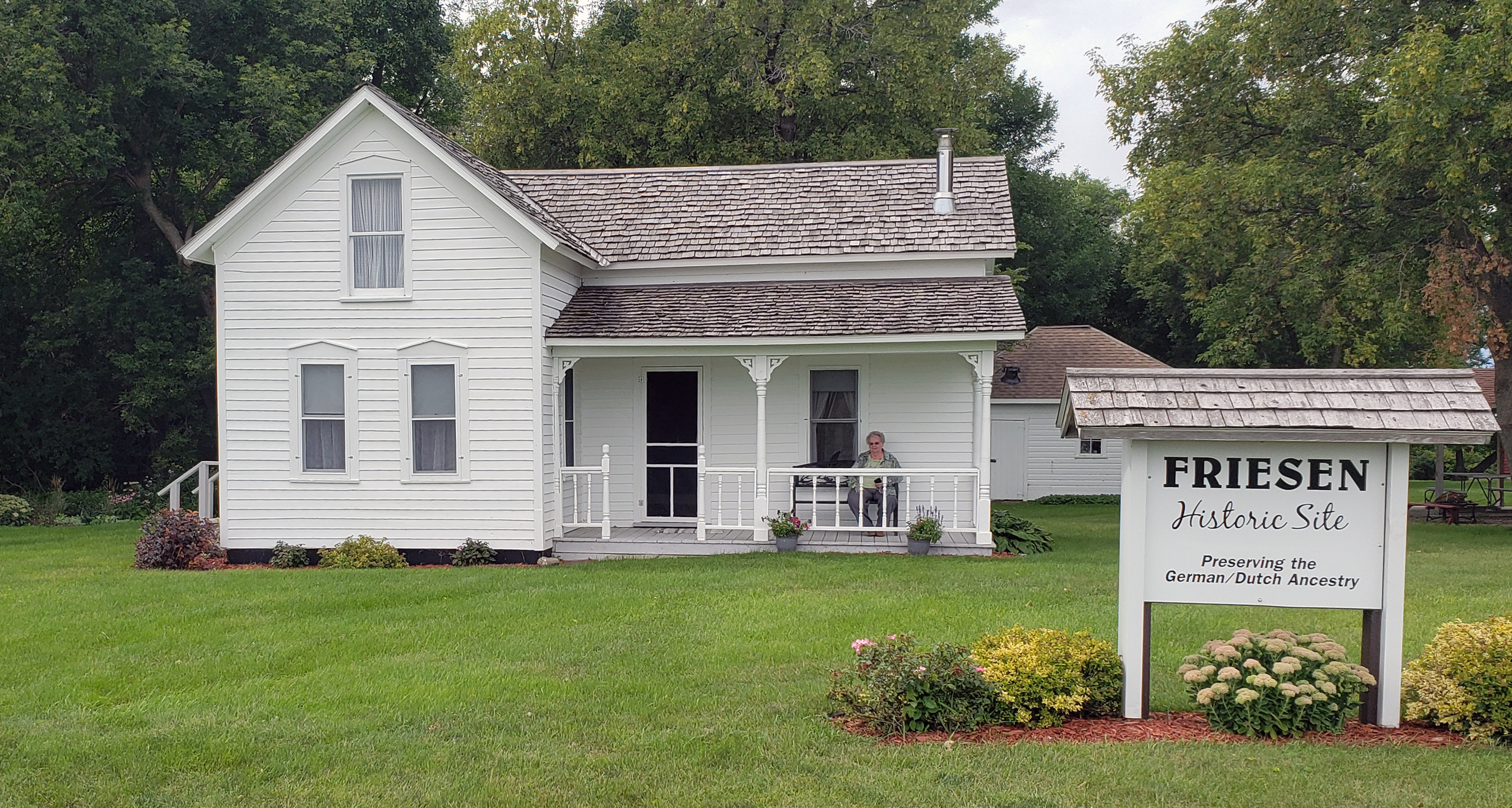
- Friesen Historic Site, a museum in Clara City
- Motto: "Crossroads of the Prairie"
- Location of Clara City, Minnesota
- Coordinates: 44°57′28″N 95°22′02″W
- Country: United States
- State: Minnesota
- County: Chippewa

Area
  - Total: 1.88 sq mi (4.87 km^{2})
  - Land: 1.88 sq mi (4.87 km^{2})
  - Water: 0 sq mi (0.00 km^{2})
- Elevation: 1,063 ft (324 m)

Population (2020)
  - Total: 1,423
  - Density: 757.0/sq mi (292.27/km^{2})
- Time zone: UTC-6 (Central (CST))
  - Summer (DST): UTC-5 (CDT)
- ZIP code: 56222
- Area code: 320
- FIPS code: 27-11548
- GNIS feature ID: 663803
- Website: www.claracity.org

Clara City is a city in Chippewa County, Minnesota. The population was 1,423 at the 2020 census.

== History ==
Clara City developed as a railroad station for the Willmar & Sioux Falls Railway. Clara City was founded in 1887. It is named after Clara Koch, the wife of one of the town founders. The city was incorporated in September 1891.

== Geography ==
According to the United States Census Bureau, the city has a total area of 1.74 square miles (4.51 km^{2}), all land.

Minnesota State Highways 7 and 23 are two of the main routes in the city.

== Churches ==
Clara City has five churches. Bethany Reformed Church (RCA), Immanuel Lutheran Church (ELCA), St. Clara's Catholic Church, and Faith Lutheran Church are in town, and Bunde Christian Reformed Church is three miles outside of town on Highway 7.

== Demographics ==
Historical population
Census	Pop.	Note	%±
1900	465		—
1910	587		26.2%
1920	750		27.8%
1930	730		−2.7%
1940	845		15.8%
1950	1,106		30.9%
1960	1,358		22.8%
1970	1,491		9.8%
1980	1,574		5.6%
1990	1,307		−17.0%
2000	1,393		6.6%
2010	1,360		−2.4%
2020	1,423		4.6%
U.S. Decennial Census

=== 2010 census ===
As of the census of 2010, there were 1,360 people, 584 households, and 360 families living in the city. The population density was 781.6 inhabitants per square mile (301.8/km^{2}). There were 625 housing units at an average density of 359.2 units per square mile (138.7 units/km^{2}). The racial makeup of the city was 96.9% White, 0.5% African American, 0.1% Native American, 0.1% Asian, 1.4% from other races, and 1.0% from two or more races. Hispanic or Latino of any race were 3.8% of the population.

There were 584 households, of which 26.5% had children under the age of 18 living with them, 48.8% were married couples living together, 9.1% had a female householder with no husband present, 3.8% had a male householder with no wife present, and 38.4% were non-families. 35.3% of all households were made up of individuals, and 22.3% had someone living alone who was 65 years of age or older. The average household size was 2.21 and the average family size was 2.83.

The median age in the city was 44.8 years. 22.9% of residents were under the age of 18; 6.4% were between the ages of 18 and 24; 20.8% were from 25 to 44; 23.1% were from 45 to 64; and 26.8% were 65 years of age or older. The gender makeup of the city was 47.6% male and 52.4% female.

=== 2000 census ===
As of the census of 2000, there were 1,393 people, 591 households, and 372 families living in the city. The population density was 729.0 inhabitants per square mile (281.5/km^{2}). There were 629 housing units at an average density of 329.2 units per square mile (127.1 units/km^{2}). The racial makeup of the city was 98.13% White, 0.14% African American, 0.07% Native American, 0.14% Asian, 1.29% from other races, and 0.22% from two or more races. Hispanic or Latino of any race were 2.15% of the population.

There were 591 households, out of which 25.7% had children under the age of 18 living with them, 55.3% were married couples living together, 5.4% had a female householder with no husband present, and 36.9% were non-families. 34.0% of all households were made up of individuals, and 23.2% had someone living alone who was 65 years of age or older. The average household size was 2.19 and the average family size was 2.81.

In the city, the population was spread out, with 20.2% under the age of 18, 5.4% from 18 to 24, 20.7% from 25 to 44, 22.0% from 45 to 64, and 31.7% who were 65 years of age or older. The median age was 48 years. For every 100 females, there were 90.3 males. For every 100 females age 18 and over, there were 81.4 males.

The median income for a household in the city was $34,306, and the median income for a family was $45,189. Males had a median income of $28,839 versus $23,304 for females. The per capita income for the city was $17,639. About 3.0% of families and 7.3% of the population were below the poverty line, including 4.6% of those under age 18 and 12.9% of those age 2 or over.
