= Asbury, Kentucky =

Unincorporated community in Kentucky, United States

Asbury
- Unincorporated community
- Location within the state of Kentucky Asbury (the United States)
- Coordinates: 38°39′55″N 84°2′45″W
- Country: United States
- State: Kentucky
- County: Bracken
- Elevation: 942 ft (287 m)
- Time zone: UTC-5 (Eastern (EST))
  - Summer (DST): UTC-4 (EDT)
- GNIS feature ID: 2362792

Asbury is an unincorporated community located in Bracken County, Kentucky, United States.
