= Hantho Township, Lac qui Parle County, Minnesota =

Hantho Township, Minnesota
- Township
- Location within the state of Minnesota Hantho Township, Minnesota (the United States)
- Coordinates: 45°6′17″N 96°3′9″W
- Country: United States
- State: Minnesota
- County: Lac qui Parle

Area
  - Total: 33.2 sq mi (86.1 km^{2})
  - Land: 30.1 sq mi (78.0 km^{2})
  - Water: 3.1 sq mi (8.1 km^{2})
- Elevation: 1,004 ft (306 m)

Population (2000)
  - Total: 154
  - Density: 5.2/sq mi (2/km^{2})
- Time zone: UTC-6 (Central (CST))
  - Summer (DST): UTC-5 (CDT)
- FIPS code: 27-27044
- GNIS feature ID: 0664395

Hantho Township is a township in Lac qui Parle County, Minnesota, United States. The population was 154 at the 2000 census.

Hantho Township was organized in 1878, and named for Halvor H. Hantho, a Norwegian settler.

== Geography ==
According to the United States Census Bureau, the township has a total area of 33.2 square miles (86 km^{2}), of which 30.1 square miles (78 km^{2}) is land and 3.1 square miles (8.0 km^{2}) (9.36%) is water.

== Demographics ==
As of the census of 2000, there were 154 people, 54 households, and 38 families residing in the township. The population density was 5.1 inhabitants per square mile (2.0/km^{2}). There were 63 housing units at an average density of 2.1 per square mile (0.81/km^{2}). The racial makeup of the township was 96.75% White and 3.25% Native American. Hispanic or Latino of any race were 0.65% of the population.

There were 54 households, out of which 35.2% had children under the age of 18 living with them, 68.5% were married couples living together, and 27.8% were non-families. 24.1% of all households were made up of individuals, and 13.0% had someone living alone who was 65 years of age or older. The average household size was 2.85 and the average family size was 3.46.

In the township the population was spread out, with 36.4% under the age of 18, 4.5% from 18 to 24, 26.0% from 25 to 44, 20.1% from 45 to 64, and 13.0% who were 65 years of age or older. The median age was 32 years. For every 100 females, there were 113.9 males. For every 100 females age 18 and over, there were 122.7 males.

The median income for a household in the township was $37,083, and the median income for a family was $51,250. Males had a median income of $30,469 versus $33,125 for females. The per capita income for the township was $12,854. None of the families and 2.3% of the population were living below the poverty line, including no under eighteens and 10.0% of those over 64.
