= Milan, Minnesota =

City in Minnesota, United States

Milan
- City
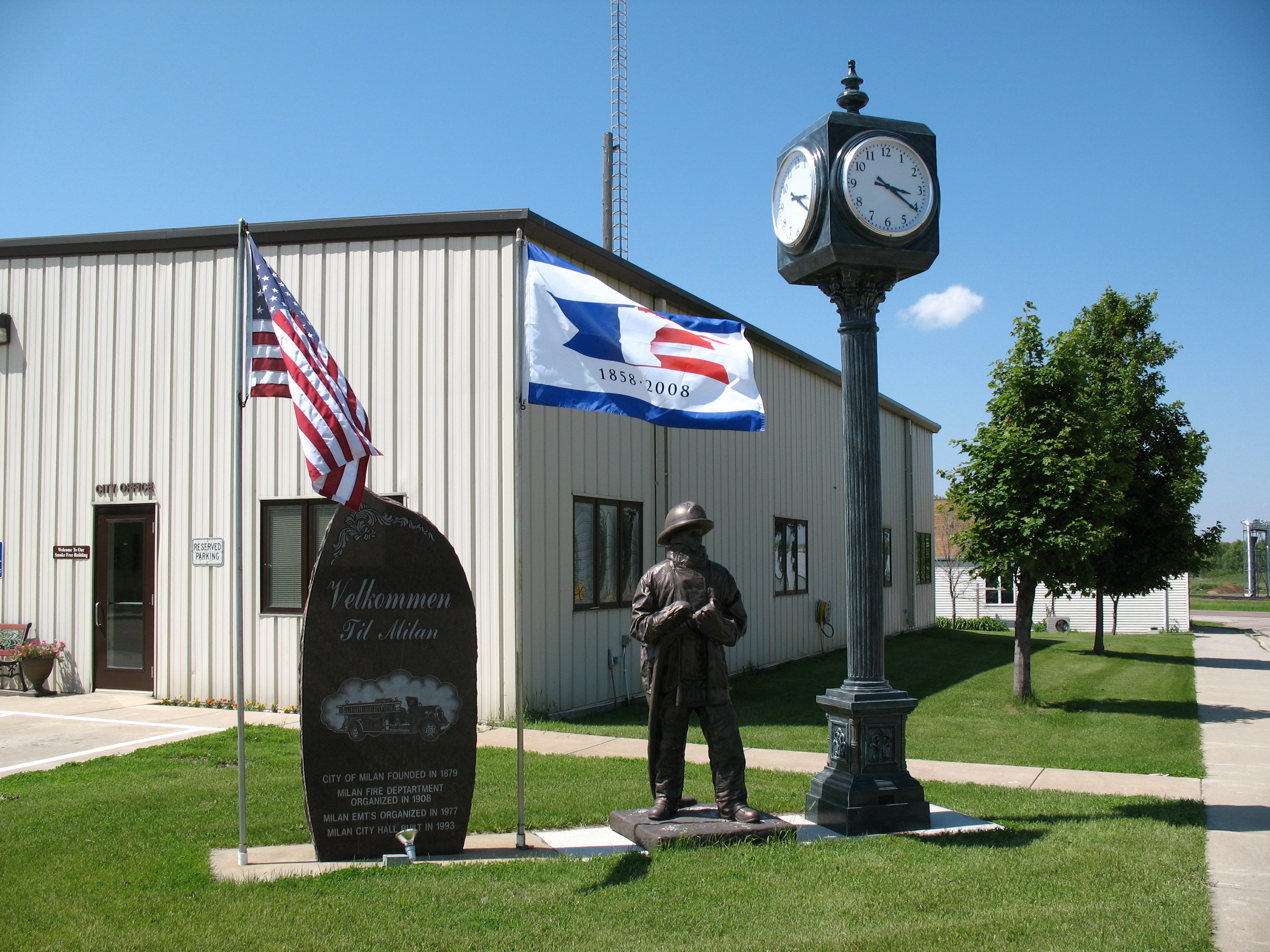
- Milan's City Hall
- Motto: "Norwegian Capital U.S.A."
- Location of Milan, Minnesota
- Coordinates: 45°06′46″N 95°54′42″W
- Country: United States
- State: Minnesota
- County: Chippewa

Area
  - Total: 0.69 sq mi (1.80 km^{2})
  - Land: 0.68 sq mi (1.77 km^{2})
  - Water: 0.012 sq mi (0.03 km^{2})
- Elevation: 1,004 ft (306 m)

Population (2020)
  - Total: 428
  - Density: 627.9/sq mi (242.42/km^{2})
- Time zone: UTC-6 (Central (CST))
  - Summer (DST): UTC-5 (CDT)
- ZIP code: 56262
- Area code: 320
- FIPS code: 27-42146
- GNIS feature ID: 2395319
- Website: City website

Milan (/ˈmaɪlən/ MY-lən) is a city in northwest Chippewa County, Minnesota, United States. The population was 428 at the 2020 census.

== History ==
Milan was platted in 1880, and incorporated in 1893. The city was named after Milan, Italy. A post office called Milan has been in operation since 1879.

== Geography ==
According to the United States Census Bureau, the city has a total area of 1.23 square miles (3.19 km^{2}), of which 1.22 square miles (3.16 km^{2}) is land and 0.01 square miles (0.03 km^{2}) is water.

U.S. Route 59 and Minnesota State Highway 7 (co-signed); and Minnesota State Highway 40 are two of the main routes in the community.

=== Climate ===
Climate data for Milan, Minnesota (1991–2020 normals, extremes 1893–present)
Month	Jan	Feb	Mar	Apr	May	Jun	Jul	Aug	Sep	Oct	Nov	Dec	Year
Record high °F (°C)	66 (19)	64 (18)	85 (29)	97 (36)	106 (41)	106 (41)	113 (45)	107 (42)	108 (42)	95 (35)	82 (28)	73 (23)	113 (45)
Mean daily maximum °F (°C)	23.9 (−4.5)	28.9 (−1.7)	42.1 (5.6)	58.7 (14.8)	72.4 (22.4)	81.4 (27.4)	84.9 (29.4)	82.4 (28.0)	76.0 (24.4)	60.8 (16.0)	43.0 (6.1)	29.0 (−1.7)	57.0 (13.9)
Daily mean °F (°C)	14.1 (−9.9)	18.8 (−7.3)	32.1 (0.1)	46.7 (8.2)	59.9 (15.5)	69.7 (20.9)	73.0 (22.8)	70.5 (21.4)	63.2 (17.3)	49.2 (9.6)	33.5 (0.8)	20.0 (−6.7)	45.9 (7.7)
Mean daily minimum °F (°C)	4.4 (−15.3)	8.7 (−12.9)	22.1 (−5.5)	34.7 (1.5)	47.4 (8.6)	58.0 (14.4)	61.2 (16.2)	58.7 (14.8)	50.3 (10.2)	37.5 (3.1)	24.0 (−4.4)	10.9 (−11.7)	34.8 (1.6)
Record low °F (°C)	−38 (−39)	−42 (−41)	−32 (−36)	−3 (−19)	16 (−9)	23 (−5)	36 (2)	30 (−1)	14 (−10)	−1 (−18)	−21 (−29)	−35 (−37)	−42 (−41)
Average precipitation inches (mm)	0.77 (20)	0.74 (19)	1.44 (37)	2.50 (64)	3.14 (80)	3.89 (99)	4.07 (103)	3.71 (94)	2.77 (70)	2.43 (62)	1.14 (29)	0.77 (20)	27.37 (695)
Average snowfall inches (cm)	9.5 (24)	10.1 (26)	9.2 (23)	6.0 (15)	0.1 (0.25)	0.0 (0.0)	0.0 (0.0)	0.0 (0.0)	0.0 (0.0)	1.2 (3.0)	6.3 (16)	8.6 (22)	51.0 (130)
Average precipitation days (≥ 0.01 in)	5.5	5.0	6.1	8.5	10.4	10.7	8.8	8.3	8.4	7.7	4.9	5.3	89.6
Average snowy days (≥ 0.1 in)	5.7	5.1	3.5	1.8	0.0	0.0	0.0	0.0	0.0	0.8	2.9	5.3	25.1
Source: NOAA

== Demographics ==
Historical population
Census	Pop.	Note	%±
1880	28		—
1900	396		—
1910	468		18.2%
1920	590		26.1%
1930	548		−7.1%
1940	624		13.9%
1950	561		−10.1%
1960	482		−14.1%
1970	427		−11.4%
1980	417		−2.3%
1990	353		−15.3%
2000	326		−7.6%
2010	369		13.2%
2020	428		16.0%
U.S. Decennial Census

Since the mid-2000s Milan has been a destination for many Micronesian immigrants, who are allowed to move freely to the United States due to the Compact of Free Association between the two countries, but have few legal pathways to citizenship and permanent residency. A third to a half of Milan's population is estimated to be Micronesian, most of them ethnic Chuukese.

=== 2010 census ===
As of the census of 2010, there were 369 people, 150 households, and 90 families living in the city. The population density was 302.5 inhabitants per square mile (116.8/km^{2}). There were 178 housing units at an average density of 145.9 per square mile (56.3/km^{2}). The racial makeup of the city was 72.1% White, 1.1% Native American, 1.1% Asian, 20.6% Pacific Islander, 3.0% from other races, and 2.2% from two or more races. Hispanic or Latino of any race were 4.3% of the population.

There were 150 households, of which 29.3% had children under the age of 18 living with them, 47.3% were married couples living together, 8.0% had a female householder with no husband present, 4.7% had a male householder with no wife present, and 40.0% were non-families. 34.0% of all households were made up of individuals, and 13.3% had someone living alone who was 65 years of age or older. The average household size was 2.46 and the average family size was 3.22.

The median age in the city was 37.5 years. 24.1% of residents were under the age of 18; 9.7% were between the ages of 18 and 24; 22.2% were from 25 to 44; 25.5% were from 45 to 64; and 18.4% were 65 years of age or older. The gender makeup of the city was 53.1% male and 46.9% female.

=== 2000 census ===
As of the census of 2000, there were 326 people, 150 households, and 88 families living in the city. The population density was 333.0 inhabitants per square mile (128.6/km^{2}). There were 176 housing units at an average density of 179.8 per square mile (69.4/km^{2}). The racial makeup of the city was 91.72% White, 0.92% Native American, 0.31% Asian, 7.06% from other races. Hispanic or Latino of any race were 7.36% of the population.

There were 150 households, out of which 26.0% had children under the age of 18 living with them, 48.7% were married couples living together, 6.7% had a female householder with no husband present, and 41.3% were non-families. 38.7% of all households were made up of individuals, and 19.3% had someone living alone who was 65 years of age or older. The average household size was 2.17 and the average family size was 2.91.

In the city, the population was spread out, with 25.8% under the age of 18, 6.1% from 18 to 24, 23.9% from 25 to 44, 17.8% from 45 to 64, and 26.4% who were 65 years of age or older. The median age was 42 years. For every 100 females, there were 111.7 males. For every 100 females age 18 and over, there were 93.6 males.

The median income for a household in the city was $31,000, and the median income for a family was $37,813. Males had a median income of $31,667 versus $19,000 for females. The per capita income for the city was $17,338. About 11.6% of families and 12.8% of the population were below the poverty line, including 23.2% of those under age 18 and 10.0% of those age 65 or over.

== In media ==
"Driving Toward the Lac qui Parle River", a poem by Robert Bly, describes a person driving from Willmar to Milan.
