= Louriston Township, Chippewa County, Minnesota =

Louriston Township, Minnesota
- Township
- Location within the state of Minnesota Louriston Township, Minnesota (the United States)
- Coordinates: 45°6′54″N 95°26′30″W
- Country: United States
- State: Minnesota
- County: Chippewa

Area
  - Total: 36.1 sq mi (93.5 km^{2})
  - Land: 35.6 sq mi (92.2 km^{2})
  - Water: 0.46 sq mi (1.2 km^{2})
- Elevation: 1,050 ft (320 m)

Population (2000)
  - Total: 211
  - Density: 6.0/sq mi (2.3/km^{2})
- Time zone: UTC-6 (Central (CST))
  - Summer (DST): UTC-5 (CDT)
- FIPS code: 27-38312
- GNIS feature ID: 0664830

Louriston Township is a township in Chippewa County, Minnesota, United States. The population was 211 at the 2000 census.

== History ==
Louriston Township was organized in 1877, and named for Laura Armstrong, the daughter of an early settler.

== Geography ==
According to the United States Census Bureau, the township has a total area of 36.1 square miles (93.5 km^{2}), of which 35.6 square miles (92.3 km^{2}) is land and 0.5 square mile (1.2 km^{2}) (1.33%) is water.

== Demographics ==
As of the census of 2000, there were 211 people, 68 households, and 59 families residing in the township. The population density was 5.9 inhabitants per square mile (2.3/km^{2}). There were 71 housing units at an average density of 2.0 per square mile (0.77/km^{2}). The racial makeup of the township was 97.63% White, and 2.37% from two or more races.

There were 68 households, out of which 45.6% had children under the age of 18 living with them, 77.9% were married couples living together, 4.4% had a female householder with no husband present, and 13.2% were non-families. 8.8% of all households were made up of individuals, and 7.4% had someone living alone who was 65 years of age or older. The average household size was 3.10 and the average family size was 3.34.

In the township the population was spread out, with 35.5% under the age of 18, 5.7% from 18 to 24, 26.1% from 25 to 44, 18.5% from 45 to 64, and 14.2% who were 65 years of age or older. The median age was 32 years. For every 100 females, there were 95.4 males. For every 100 females age 18 and over, there were 94.3 males.

The median income for a household in the township was $41,250, and the median income for a family was $43,750. Males had a median income of $32,500 versus $14,375 for females. The per capita income for the township was $20,876. About 7.1% of families and 10.4% of the population were below the poverty line, including 15.6% of those under the age of eighteen and 6.7% of those 65 or over.
