= List of county roads in Scott County, Minnesota =

- Standard county road marker

Highway names
- Interstates: Interstate X (I-X)
- US Highways: U.S. Highway X (US X)
- State: Trunk Highway X (MN X or TH X)
- County State-Aid Highways: County State-Aid Highway X (CSAH X)
- County Roads: County Road X (CR X)

System links
- County roads of Minnesota; Scott County

The following is a list of county-maintained roads in Scott County, Minnesota, United States. Many routes in this list are also county-state-aid-highways (CSAH.)

== Route list ==
Number	Length (mi)	Length (km)	Southern or western terminus	Northern or eastern terminus	Formed	Removed	Notes
CSAH 1	2.790	4.490	Sibley County line (County 5)	US 169 in Blakeley Township	—	—	
CSAH 2	—	—	County 61 in Helena Township	Dakota County line (County 9)	—	—	Non-CSAH west of County Road 11.
CSAH 3	5.669	9.123	Le Sueur County line (County 11)	MN 25 in Belle Plaine	—	—	
CSAH 4	—	—	County 7 in Belle Plaine Township	Saint Benedict Road in Helena Township	—	—	Non-CSAH east of County Road 11.
CSAH 5	—	—	Kittson Boulevard in Belle Plaine	US 169 / MN 25 in Belle Plaine	—	—	
CSAH 5	6.383	10.272	Le Sueur County line (County 32)	County 5A in Belle Plaine Township	—	—	
CR 5A	—	—	County 5 in Belle Plaine Township	County 7A in Belle Plaine	—	—	
CSAH 6	4.550	7.323	County 1 / County 60 in Blakeley Township	MN 25 in Belle Plaine	—	—	
CSAH 7	—	—	Le Sueur County line (County 31)	County 5 / County 7A in Belle Plaine	—	—	
CR 7A	—	—	County 5A in Belle Plaine	County 5 / County 7 in Belle Plaine	—	—	
CSAH 8	—	—	MN 21 in Helena Township	Dakota County line (County 60)	—	—	
CSAH 9	—	—	US 169 / MN 282 in Jordan	Carver County line (County 11)	—	—	
CSAH 10	—	—	MN 282 in Sand Creek Township	County 23 in Spring Lake Township	—	—	
CSAH 11	—	—	Le Sueur County line (County 30)	MN 21 in Helena Township	—	—	
CSAH 12	—	—	County 17 in Spring Lake Township	MN 13 in Prior Lake	—	—	
CSAH 14	—	—	US 169 in Louisville Township	County 17 in Shakopee	—	—	
CSAH 15	—	—	Le Sueur County line (County 60)	6th Avenue West in Shakopee	—	—	
CSAH 16	—	—	County 15 in Shakopee	Dakota County line	—	—	
CSAH 17	—	—	MN 282 in Spring Lake Township	County 101 in Shakopee	—	—	
CSAH 18	—	—	County 42 in Prior Lake	County 21 in Shakopee	—	—	
CSAH 21	11.722	18.865	Dakota County line (County 60)	US 169 in Shakopee	—	—	Part of the National Highway System from County Road 42 to US 169.
CSAH 23	—	—	MN 19 / County 86 in Cedar Lake Township	MN 13 in Prior Lake	—	—	
CSAH 27	—	—	Rice County line (County 3)	County 16 in Savage	—	—	
CR 29	—	—	County 91 in New Market Township	Dakota County line	—	—	
CSAH 37	—	—	MN 21 in Helena Township	MN 19 / MN 13 in New Prague	—	—	
CSAH 42	8.447	13.594	County 17 in Shakopee	Dakota County line (County 42)	—	—	Part of the National Highway System from County Road 21 to the Dakota County line.
CSAH 44	—	—	MN 13 in Prior Lake	County 27 in Savage	—	—	
CSAH 46	—	—	County 86 in New Market Township	Dakota County line (County 5S)	—	—	
CSAH 47	—	—	County 86 in New Market Township	Dakota County line (County 5)	—	—	
CR 51	—	—	Le Sueur County line	County 1 in Blakeley Township	—	—	
CR 53	—	—	MN 19 in Blakeley Township	US 169 in Blakeley Township	—	—	
CR 56	—	—	MN 13 in Cedar Lake Township	County 87 in Cedar Lake Township	—	—	
CSAH 59	—	—	County 7 in Belle Plaine Township	US 169 in Saint Lawrence Township	—	—	
CR 60	—	—	County 1 in Blakeley Township	US 169 in Blakeley Township	—	—	
CR 61	—	—	MN 19 in Helena Township, Belle Plaine Township	County 66 in Jordan	—	—	
CR 62	—	—	County 87 in Cedar Lake Township	Dakota County line	—	—	
CR 64	—	—	County 5 in Belle Plaine	County 61 in Belle Plaine Township, Helena Township	—	—	
CR 66	—	—	US 169 in Saint Lawrence Township	MN 21 in Jordan	—	—	
CSAH 68	—	—	County 23 in Spring Lake Township	Dakota County line (County 64)	—	—	
CSAH 69	—	—	County 14 in Louisville Township	County 101 in Shakopee	—	—	Non-CSAH south of US 169.
CR 70	—	—	County 15 in Sand Creek Township	County 79 in Sand Creek Township, Spring Lake Township	—	—	
CR 73	—	—	Zumbro Avenue in Jackson Township, Louisville Township	County 78 in Jackson Township	—	—	
CR 76	—	—	County 66 in Saint Lawrence Township	County 59 in St. Lawrence Township	—	—	
CR 77	—	—	County 78 in Jackson Township	US 169 in Shakopee	—	—	No access to US 169; overpass
CSAH 78	—	—	US 169 / MN 41 in Jackson Township	County 17 in Shakopee	—	—	
CR 79	—	—	County 10 in Spring Lake Township	10th Avenue East in Shakopee	—	—	
CR 81	—	—	County 8 in Spring Lake Township, Cedar Lake Township	MN 13 in Spring Lake Township, Prior Lake	—	—	
CR 81	—	—	Spring Lake Regional Park in Prior Lake	County 82 in Prior Lake	—	—	
CSAH 82	—	—	County 17 in Prior Lake, Shakopee	County 21 in Prior Lake	—	—	
CSAH 83	—	—	County 82 in Prior Lake	County 101 in Shakopee	—	—	
CR 85	—	—	County 86 in Cedar Lake Township	County 2 in Cedar Lake Township	—	—	
CSAH 86	—	—	MN 19 / County 23 in Cedar Lake Township	Dakota County line (County 86)	—	—	Runs concurrent with Rice County Road 86 along its entire length.
CR 87	—	—	County 56 in Cedar Lake Township	County 21 in Credit River	—	—	
CR 89	—	—	MN 19 / MN 13 in Helena Township	County 8 in Helena Township, Sand Creek Township	—	—	
CSAH 91	—	—	County 86 in New Market Township	County 21 in Credit River	—	—	
CSAH 101	—	—	Carver County line (County 101)	US 169, MN 101 (unmarked MN 901B), MN 13 in Shakopee	1988	current	Originally part of MN 101 until 1988.
