= Helena, Minnesota =

Helena
- Unincorporated community
- Location within Minnesota Location within the United States
- Coordinates: 44°37′52″N 93°35′21″W
- Country: United States
- State: Minnesota
- County: Scott
- Township: Helena Township and Sand Creek Township
- Elevation: 860 ft (260 m)
- Time zone: UTC-6 (Central (CST))
  - Summer (DST): UTC-5 (CDT)
- ZIP code: 55352
- Area code: 952
- GNIS feature ID: 1817706

Helena is an unincorporated community in Scott County, Minnesota, United States.

The community is located south-southeast of Jordan along Scott County Road 8 (220th Street West) near Camber Avenue.

Helena Boulevard (Highway 21) is also in the immediate area.

Helena is located within Helena Township and Sand Creek Township. Nearby places include Jordan and New Prague.

Raven Stream, Sand Creek, and Porter Creek meet at Helena.
