= St. Patrick, Minnesota =

St. Patrick
- Unincorporated community
- Location within Minnesota Location within the United States
- Coordinates: 44°35′41″N 93°30′08″W
- Country: United States
- State: Minnesota
- County: Scott
- Township: Cedar Lake Township
- Elevation: 991 ft (302 m)
- Time zone: UTC-6 (Central (CST))
  - Summer (DST): UTC-5 (CDT)
- ZIP code: 56071 and 55352
- Area code: 952
- GNIS feature ID: 650935

St. Patrick is an unincorporated community in Cedar Lake Township, Scott County, Minnesota, United States.

The community is located along Langford Avenue (Highway 13) at Scott County Road 56 near New Prague and Jordan.
