= Robert J. Schmitz (politician) =

American politician (1921–1999)

Member of the Minnesota Senate from the 36th district
- In office January 7, 1975 – January 7, 1991

Personal details
- Born: April 23, 1921 St. Lawrence Township, Scott County, Minnesota, U.S.
- Died: October 10, 1999 (aged 78) Jordan, Minnesota, U.S.
- Resting place: Calvary Cemetery, Jordan, Minnesota, U.S.
- Party: Democratic (DFL)
- Spouse: Grace Savage
- Children: 5
- Occupation: Politician, farmer, businessman

Robert J. Schmitz (April 23, 1921 – October 10, 1999) was an American farmer, businessman, and politician.

Schmitz was born in St. Lawrence Township, Scott County, Minnesota. Schmitz lived on a farm near Jordan, Minnesota with his wife and family. He was a farmer and the owner of the Schmitz Farmer Equipment Company. Schmitz served on the Scott County Soil and Conservation District Board. He served in the Minnesota Senate from 1975 to 1990 and was a Democrat. He died from Alzheimer's disease at the Valley View Nursing Home in Jordan, Minnesota.
