= Shakopee High School =

Location
- 100 17th Avenue West; Shakopee, Minnesota; United States; 44.7703°N 93.5271°W

Information
- Type: Public
- School district: Shakopee Public Schools #720
- Superintendent: Mike Redmond
- Principal: Jeff Pawlicki
- Grades: 9–12
- Enrollment: 2,823 (2023–2024)
- Colors: Red, white, and black
- Song: Shako Fight
- Mascot: Sammy the Saber
- Website: www.shakopee.k12.mn.us

Shakopee High School is a four-year public high school as of fall 2018 located in Shakopee, Minnesota, United States. The school district serves nearly 8,380 students in Shakopee, Savage, Prior Lake, and the Jackson, Louisville, and Sand Creek Townships. It is also Minnesota's largest secondary school by size, with an interior of 665,000 square feet. The district is located in one of the fastest-growing suburbs in the Twin Cities. The high school received a major expansion and was reopened after a summer of construction in the fall of 2018.

== School facilities ==
Shakopee High School was located at 200 10th Avenue East until the fall of 2007, when the current high school opened two miles away at 100 17th Avenue West. The building that previously served as the high school is now Shakopee West Middle School. The high school began expansion in 2016. The newly expanded building is 700,000 square feet, which is double to the original 335,000 square feet, and adds to 1,600 students to the original 1,600 students capacity. The expansion included new southwest and northern wings, a new athletics wing, a turf practice field, and an auditorium with 800 seats.

== The Academy System ==
Founded in 2018, Shakopee High School is one of the two high schools in Minnesota that utilizes this model.The Academies of Shakopee is an interest and career-central model that organizes students into smaller learning communities into student interest and coursework that connect students to real-world learning experiences.

At the beginning of the Freshman year, each students explores begins in Freshman Academy By Sophomore year they choose what academy they will study in for the remainder of High School. Each Academy has a designated space within the high school. The Academies are Human Services, Science and Technology, Art and Communication, Business and Entrepreneurship, Engineering and Manufacturing, and Health Science.

== Athletics ==
Shakopee High School has won a total of eight state championships, including five championships sponsored by the Minnesota State High School League. The school's volleyball team won three straight Class 3A state titles in 2007, 2008 and 2009. The boys' basketball team won the Class 3A state championship in 2005. The school also won the 2015 Adaptive Softball state title as part of a co-op with Chaska, Chanhassen and Prior Lake. Additionally, the school won the boys' track and field true team state title in 1995 and the girls' track and field true team state title in both 1995 and 1996.

== Demographics ==
As of 2024-2025, approximately 48.4% of students are white, 16.5% are Hispanic or Latino, 11.1% of students are Asian, and 15.6% are black or African-American. 35% of students are reported to be on the free or reduced-price meal plan offered by the school.

== Notable people and alumni ==
- Jamal Abu-Shamala, professional basketball player
- Deven Eastern, professional football defensive lineman for the Seattle Seahawks
- Maurice Stans, 19th United States Secretary of Commerce
- Charlie Vig, Chairman of the Shakopee Mdewakanton Sioux Community
