= Union Hill, Minnesota =

Unincorporated community in Minnesota, US

- Unincorporated community
- Union Hill from the west

- Location within Minnesota Location within the United States
- Coordinates: 44°32′37″N 93°40′02″W
- Country: United States
- State: Minnesota
- Counties: Le Sueur; Scott
- Townships: Derrynane; Belle Plaine
- Elevation: 994 ft (303 m)
- Time zone: UTC-6 (Central (CST))
  - Summer (DST): UTC-5 (CDT)
- ZIP code: 56071
- Area code: 952
- GNIS feature ID: 653506

Union Hill is an unincorporated community in Le Sueur and Scott counties in the U.S. state of Minnesota.

The community is located four miles west of New Prague at the junction of State Highway 19 (MN 19), County Road 31 (201st Avenue), and Church Avenue. Nearby places also include Heidelberg, Henderson, and Belle Plaine. The West Branch of Raven Stream flows through the community.

Union Hill is located within Derrynane Township in Le Sueur County; and also located within Belle Plaine Township in Scott County. A post office previously operated in the community from 1876 to 1903. Union Hill is located within ZIP code 56071 based in New Prague.

The community is present primarily due to the 1867 founding of St. John the Evangelist (Roman Catholic) Church.

There is a baseball field located in the community, with an active Townball team.
