= U.S. Route 169 in Minnesota =

Section of U.S. Highway in Minnesota, United States

U.S. Highway 169
- US 169 highlighted in red

Route information
- Maintained by MnDOT
- Length: 359.523 mi (578.596 km)
- Existed: 1931–present
- Tourist routes: Great River Road; Minnesota River Valley Scenic Byway; Lake Mille Lacs Scenic Byway

Major junctions
- South end: US 169 in Elmore at the Minnesota–Iowa state line
- I-90 in Blue Earth; US 14 / MN 60 in Mankato; I-494 / MN 5 in Bloomington; US 212 / MN 62 in Edina; I-394 / US 12 in St. Louis Park; I-94 / I-694 / US 52 in Brooklyn Park; US 10 / MN 47 in Anoka; US 10 / MN 101 in Elk River; US 2 in Grand Rapids; MN 65 near Pengilly
- North end: US 53 in Virginia

Location
- Country: United States
- State: Minnesota
- Counties: Faribault, Blue Earth, Nicollet, Sibley, Le Sueur, Scott, Hennepin, Anoka, Sherburne, Mille Lacs, Crow Wing, Aitkin, Itasca, St. Louis

Highway system
- United States Numbered Highway System; List; Special; Divided; Minnesota Trunk Highway System; Interstate; US; State; Legislative; Scenic
| ← MN 165 | → MN 169 |

U.S. Highway 169 (US 169) is a major north–south United States Numbered Highway in the state of Minnesota, connecting the Minnesota River valley with the Twin Cities and the Iron Range. Much of the route is built to expressway or freeway standards.

== Route description ==
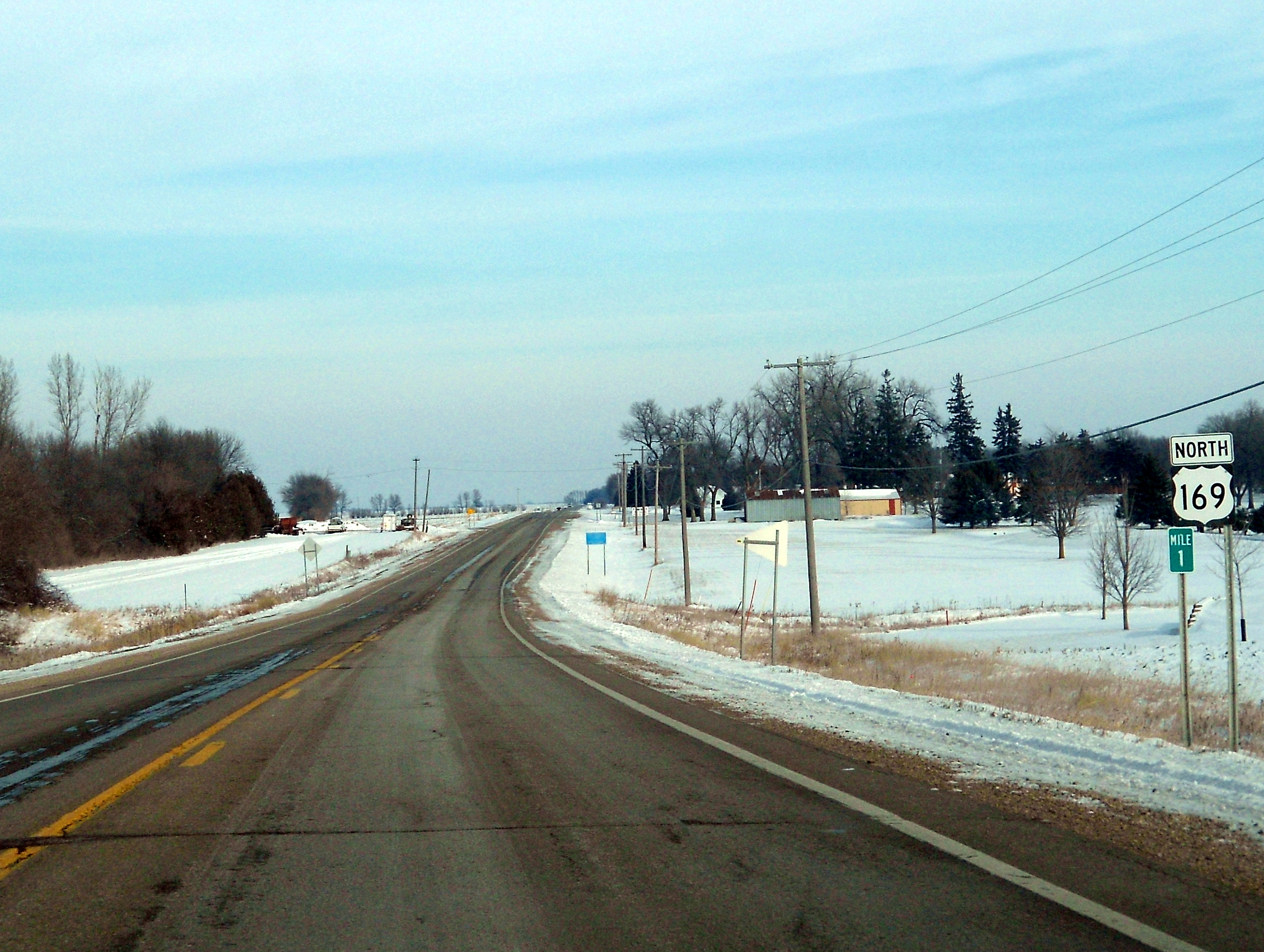
First reassurance marker in Minnesota north of the Iowa state line

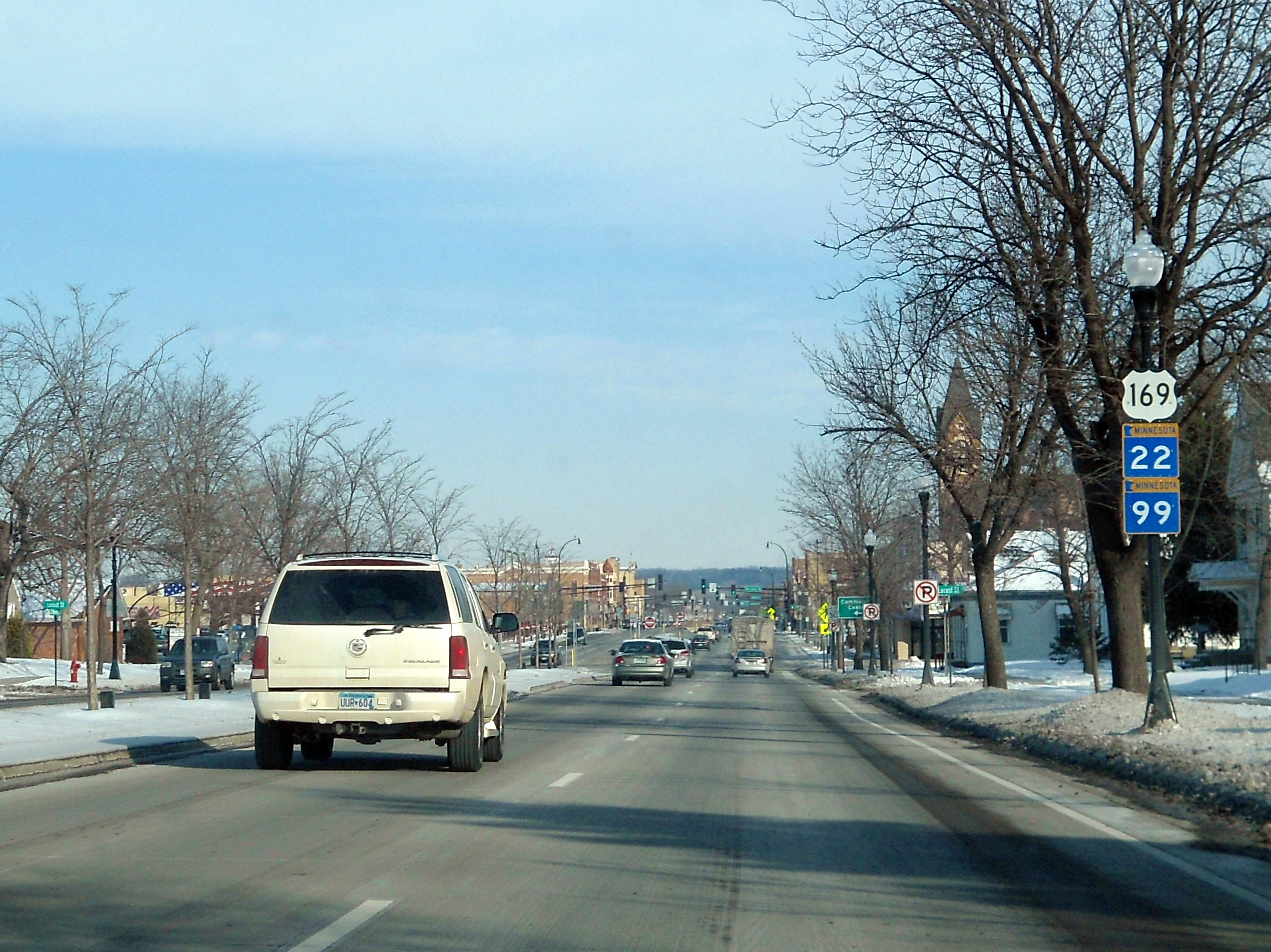
US 169 northbound concurrent with MN 22 and MN 99 in St. Peter

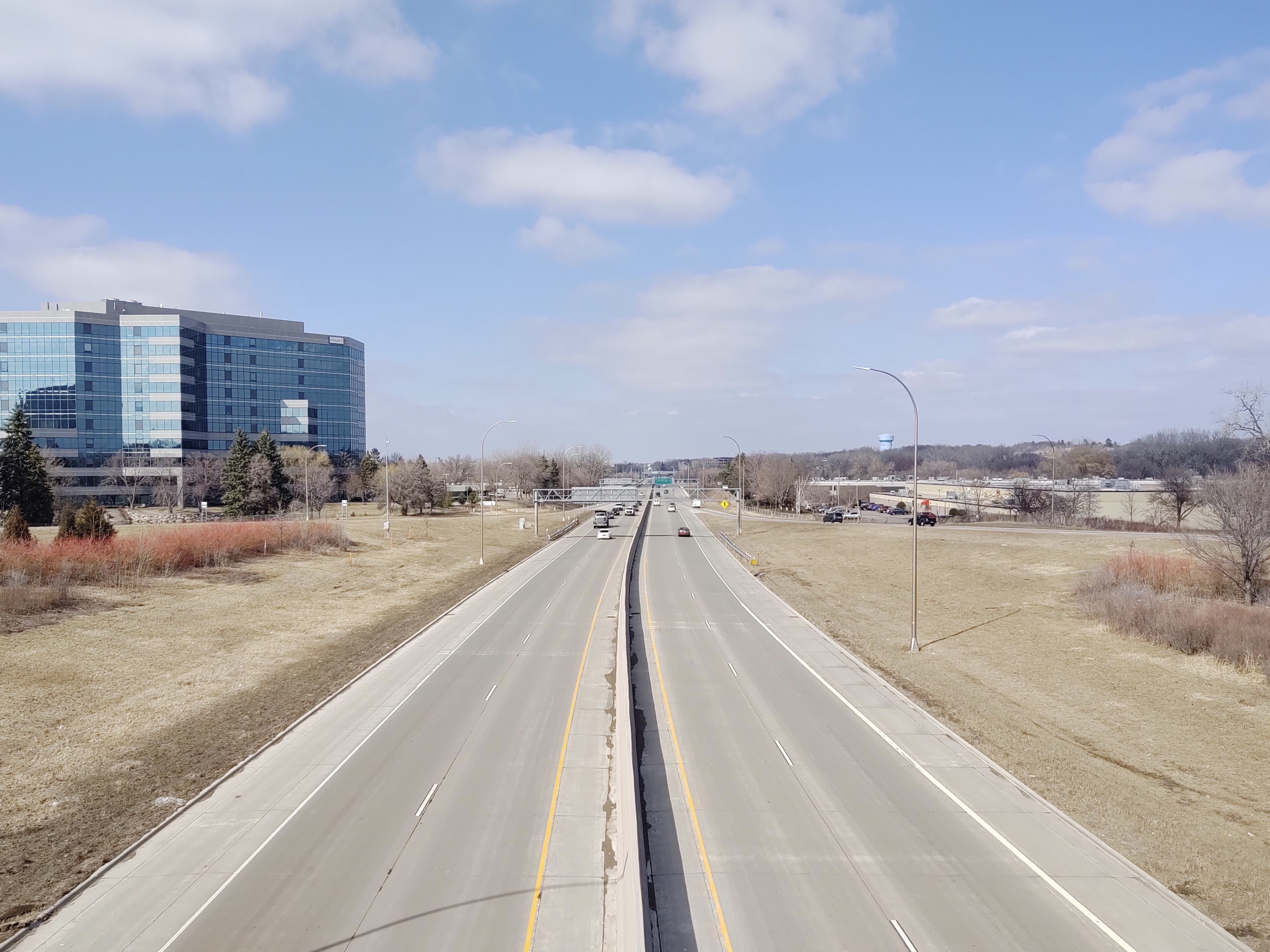
US 169 in Minnetonka, looking north

US 169 enters Minnesota near Elmore as a two-lane, undivided highway, continuing as such through the majority of Blue Earth. Near the northern outskirts of the town, it expands to a four-lane, divided highway, subsequently crossing Interstate 90 (I-90). Soon after, it reverts to its original two-lane size. Roughly five miles (8.0 km) southwest of Mankato, US 169 and State Highway 60 (MN 60) merge to a single expressway through Mankato. In North Mankato, MN 60 moves from a concurrency with US 169 to another one with US 14.

In Mankato and North Mankato, US 169 functions as an arterial highway, passing directly through the cities' downtown area. From Mankato north to Jackson Township, the route remains an expressway, except for the section passing through St. Peter, where US 169 is the main street through town.

The 55 miles (89 km) of US 169 from St. Peter to I-494 in Bloomington is officially designated the John A. Johnson Memorial Highway. This includes the Bloomington Ferry Bridge between Shakopee and Bloomington. This designation is marked as Johnson Memorial Drive on some maps, but not marked as such on directional signs, nor commonly known by this name.

In the Twin Cities area, the route is constructed to freeway standards between MN 41 in Jackson Township and 109th Avenue North in Brooklyn Park. The freeway between I-494 and I-694 was originally built by Hennepin County as County Road 18 (CR 18). In 1988, CR 18 was transferred to the state of Minnesota and became the new alignment for US 169 in the Minneapolis area. In exchange, Hennepin County took over maintenance of two other highways that were formerly state routes. In the Minneapolis area, US 169 is often congested, but the freeway passes close to residential neighborhoods in many locations, so any expansion of the freeway would disrupt housing stock in the surrounding area.

From 109th Avenue North to the Mississippi River, US 169 remains an expressway until Anoka, where it becomes a street. It then joins US 10 west to Elk River. Those highways diverge at Babcock Wayside on the Mississippi River.

North of the Twin Cities metropolitan area, US 169 continues as an expressway to Mille Lacs Lake, an important resort area. The highway skirts the western shore of the lake. The 74 miles (119 km) of US 169 from Elk River to Garrison is officially designated the POW/MIA Memorial Highway. From Mille Lacs Lake, US 169 continues northward to its junction with US 2 at Grand Rapids. Starting in Aitkin, US 169 and MN 210 share eight miles (13 km) of road. In Grand Rapids, US 169 turns northeasterly to reach the cities of the Mesabi Iron Range.

At the eastern end of Grand Rapids, US 169 becomes an expressway and remains such for eight miles (13 km). An additional 1.5 miles (2.4 km), from Taconite to CR 7 was completed in 2016. It passes through the cities of Hibbing, Chisholm, and Mountain Iron before reaching US 53 at the city of Virginia. This four-lane stretch of US 169 is also known as the Highway 169 Cross Range Expressway, with the highway shifted south between Mountain Iron and Virginia to allow for expansion of the U.S. Steel Minntac iron ore mine. The northern terminus of US 169 is at the city of Virginia.

MN 169 begins immediately north of Virginia in Wuori Township and continues northeast for 49 miles (79 km) to the cities of Tower, Ely, and Winton. MN 169 is numbered as an extension of US 169.

US 169 is one of three Minnesota U.S. Numbered highways to carry the same number as an existing state marked highway within the state. The others being Highways US 61 and US 65.

Legally, the Minnesota section of US 169 is defined as all or part of Routes 5, 7, 383, 3, 18, and 35 in the Minnesota Statutes §§161.114(2) and 161.117(4). The route is not marked with those numbers.

== History ==
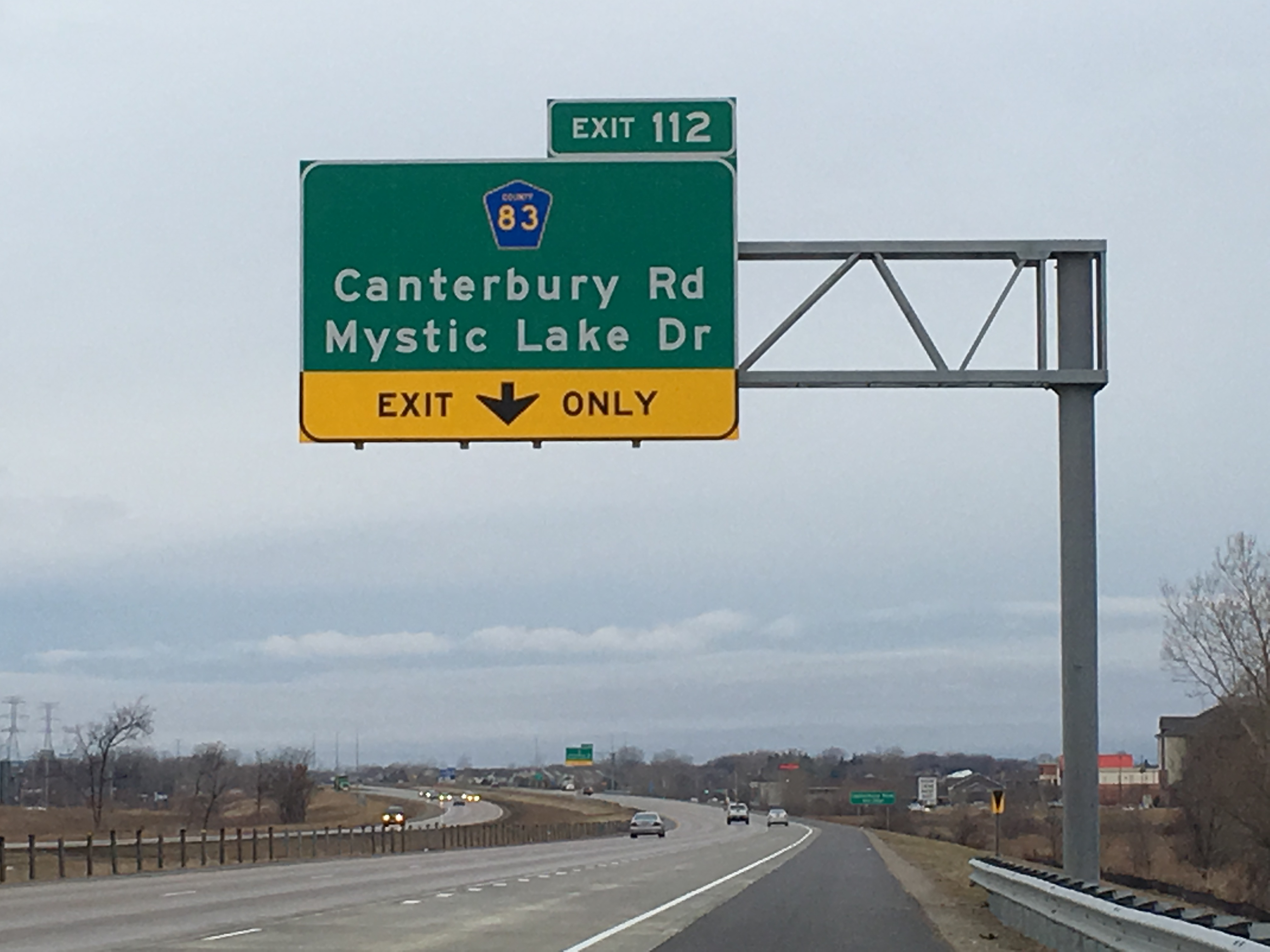
Exit numbers started appearing in Shakopee in 2016

US 169 was extended into Minnesota c. 1931. The route in Minnesota was paved by 1940.

Previously, US 169 served as the northern terminus of US 53 in Virginia. US 169 then continued north into International Falls. Today, US 53 serves as the terminus of US 169 in Virginia.

US 169, between the junction with MN 60 (south of Mankato) and the Twin Cities, was upgraded to at least expressway status over several stages. The freeway section around Mankato and the adjoining expressway sections were completed in the early 1960s, along with bypasses of Le Sueur, Jordan and Belle Plaine.

The US 169 freeway bypass around Shakopee was built in the mid-1990s along a new alignment, which included the newly constructed Bloomington Ferry Bridge. Prior to this realignment, US 169 crossed the Minnesota River from downtown Shakopee where it had been co-signed with MN 101. North of the river crossing, US 169 had previously been co-signed with what was then US 212 (Flying Cloud Drive) through Eden Prairie until 1996.

A new US 169 interchange with MN 19, near Henderson, was completed in 2002.

An expressway section of US 169 through southern Hennepin County was converted to full freeway in 2006, with new interchanges constructed at Pioneer Trail and Anderson Lakes Parkway. At-grade intersections with traffic signals have been removed at the recently constructed I-494 interchange, which was previously a point of frequent congestion.

North of the Twin Cities, US 169 has been upgraded to an expressway between Elk River and the southern end of Mille Lacs Lake, with bypasses of Princeton and Milaca built in the late 1980s.

The expressway section between Pengilly and the city of Virginia was built in the late 1970s and early 1980s.

In 2008, construction began on a new US 169 interchange with CR 81 and 85th Avenue North in Brooklyn Park. This interchange is also known as The Devil's Triangle, or simply as The Triangle, because of the major traffic congestion during rush hour, especially in the afternoon. Construction was completed on August 11, 2011.

During the flooding of September 2010, flood waters destroyed a 150-foot (46 m) section of the northbound lanes of US 169 between St. Peter and Le Sueur. Minnesota Department of Transportation (MnDOT) believes, "when the flood waters rose up it found a weak spot in the slope or the dirt bank and got under the grass and started mining under the pavement. Finally, it just sucked all the dirt out and the pavement just dropped into a hole." Traffic was detoured to the southbound lanes of US 169 for a month, resulting in a temporary two-lane expressway, until the northbound section was repaired.

In November 2010, construction began on a completely redesigned US 169 interchange at I-494, where three traffic signals had existed. The new interchange features six roundabouts, new flyover bridges, and two new bridges over I-494 that will carry West 78th Street and Washington Avenue. Major construction began in March 2011. Construction continued in early 2012 with the completion of reconstructing surrounding roads and remaining ramps. MnDOT completed the entire project in November 2012. The 2010 cost of the construction project was $140 million.

In 2016, exit numbers have started appearing on the Shakopee portion of the freeway section in the Minneapolis-Saint Paul metro area.

Between 2022 and 2024, the section of US 169 between US 10 and 197th Avenue in Elk River was being rebuilt as a freeway, with four new interchanges and a replacement of the northbound bridge over US 10. In 2023, the cloverleaf interchange at Rockford Road in Plymouth was replaced with a folded-diamond interchange and a new, wider bridge to accommodate for both bicyclists and pedestrians.

A study to convert US 169 to a freeway between US 10 in Elk River to 277th Avenue north of Zimmerman was completed in late 2009. A complete review of the project by MnDOT occurred in 2011. A complete construction schedule and timeline were released by MnDOT. Allocation of funds for the project was currently underway and the only thing holding back from starting the project. The project is expected to cost around $178 Million. In the meantime, the 14 miles (23 km) between US 10 in Elk River to 277th Avenue north of Zimmerman were resurfaced during the 2012 construction season. The construction began in May 2012.

== Major intersections ==
| County | Location | mi | km | Exit | Destinations | Notes |
|---|---|---|---|---|---|---|
| Faribault | Elmore | 0.000 | 0.000 | | US 169 south – Algona | Continuation into Iowa |
| Faribault | Blue Earth | 9.599 | 15.448 | | CSAH 16 east / CSAH 53 (7th Street) | Southern end of CSAH 16 concurrency; formerly US 16; access to United Hospital District Hospital |
| Faribault | Blue Earth | 10.189 | 16.398 | | CSAH 16 west (Leland Parkway) / 1st Street | Northern end of CSAH 16 concurrency; formerly US 16 |
| Faribault | Blue Earth | 11.308– 11.365 | 18.198– 18.290 | | I-90 – Fairmont, Albert Lea | I-90 exit 119 |
| Faribault | Winnebago | 19.595 | 31.535 | | MN 109 east – Wells | |
| Blue Earth | Amboy | 28.506 | 45.876 | | MN 30 east – Mapleton | Southern end of MN 30 concurrency |
| Blue Earth | Amboy | 28.852 | 46.433 | | MN 30 west – St. James | Northern end of MN 30 concurrency |
| Blue Earth | South Bend Township | 47.746 | 76.840 | | MN 60 west – Lake Crystal, Sioux City | Southern end of MN 60 concurrency |
| Blue Earth | South Bend Township | 49.426– 49.484 | 79.543– 79.637 | – | CSAH 90 east | Partial interchange; entrances and northbound exit; southbound exit via at-grade left turn |
| Blue Earth | South Bend Township | 50.658 | 81.526 | | MN 68 west / Minnesota River Valley Scenic Byway – New Ulm, Campground | At-grade intersection |
| Blue Earth | Mankato | 52.057 | 83.778 | — | Frontage Road | Northbound exit and southbound entrance; southern end of expressway section |
| Blue Earth | Mankato | 52.941 | 85.200 | — | Riverfront Drive | Former MN 66 |
| Nicollet | North Mankato | 52.919 | 85.165 | — | Lookout Drive, Center Street | Center Street not signed southbound |
| Nicollet | North Mankato | 53.568 | 86.209 | — | North Mankato, Mankato, Downtown | Northern end of expressway section |
| Nicollet | Mankato–North Mankato line | 55.659 | 89.574 | – | MN 60 east / US 14 / Minnesota River Valley Scenic Byway – New Ulm, Waseca | Northern end of MN 60 concurrency; interchange |
| Nicollet | St. Peter | 64.726 | 104.166 | – | MN 295 – St. Peter Regional Treatment Center | Former southbound exit, northbound intersection |
| Nicollet | St. Peter | 64.839 | 104.348 | | MN 99 west – Nicollet | Southern end of MN 99 concurrency; at-grade intersection |
| Nicollet | St. Peter | 64.985 | 104.583 | | MN 22 south / Minnesota River Valley Scenic Byway | Southern end of MN 22 concurrency; at-grade intersection |
| Nicollet | St. Peter | 65.954 | 106.143 | | MN 99 east (Broadway Avenue) / Minnesota River Valley Scenic Byway to CSAH 5 – Le Center | Northern end of MN 99 concurrency; at-grade intersection |
| Nicollet | St. Peter | 67.705 | 108.961 | | MN 22 north – Gaylord | Northern end of MN 22 concurrency; at-grade intersection |
| Sibley | Henderson Township | 76.194 | 122.622 | – | MN 93 south / CSAH 8 west (336th Street) / Minnesota River Valley Scenic Byway – Le Sueur | Southern end of MN 93 concurrency |
| Sibley | Henderson Township | 77.166 | 124.187 | | MN 93 north / Minnesota River Valley Scenic Byway – Henderson | Northern end of MN 93 concurrency; at-grade intersection |
| Le Sueur | Le Sueur | 78.383 | 126.145 | – | CSAH 22 south – Le Sueur | Interchange; formerly MN 112 |
| Le Sueur–Scott county line | Tyrone–Blakeley township line | 83.821 | 134.897 | – | MN 19 – New Prague, Gaylord | |
| Scott | Belle Plaine | 90.714 | 145.990 | – | CSAH 3 (Meridian Street) | Right in/right out interchange |
| Scott | Belle Plaine | 91.855 | 147.826 | – | MN 25 north (Main Street) CSAH 64 east (Main Street) | |
| Scott | Jackson Township | 96.209 | 154.833 | 96 | CSAH 55 (Delaware Avenue) | Interchange |
| Scott | Jordan | 98.201 | 158.039 | – | MN 282 east / CSAH 9 to MN 21 | Replacement with an interchange in progress; incomplete access to CSAH 9 past Syndicate Street |
| Scott | Jordan | 99.100 | 159.486 | – | MN 21 south – Jordan, New Prague | Partial interchange; MN 21 only signed southbound |
| Scott | Jackson Township | 103.614 | 166.751 | — | CSAH 14 north (150th Street) | Right-in/right-out interchange |
| Scott | Jackson Township | 105.963 | 170.531 | 106 | MN 41 north / CSAH 78 south – Chaska | Southern end of freeway section |
| Scott | Shakopee | 107.252 | 172.605 | 107 | CSAH 69 (Old Brick Yard Road) / US 169 Bus. north | US 169 Business only signed northbound |
| Scott | Shakopee | 108.203 | 174.136 | 108 | CSAH 15 (Marystown Road) | |
| Scott | Shakopee | 109.948 | 176.944 | 110 | CSAH 17 (Marschall Road) | Access to St. Francis Regional Medical Center and Marschall Road Transit Station |
| Scott | Shakopee | 111.691 | 179.749 | 112 | CSAH 83 (Canterbury Road) | |
| Scott | Shakopee | 113.689– 113.749 | 182.965– 183.061 | 113 | MN 13 / CSAH 21 – Burnsville | Northbound exit and southbound entrance only; access to Eagle Creek Park and Ride |
| Scott | Shakopee | 114.236– 114.307 | 183.845– 183.959 | 114 | CSAH 21 to CSAH 18 | No northbound exit; northbound entrance includes direct entrance ramp from Stagecoach Road |
| Scott | Shakopee | 114.636– 115.379 | 184.489– 185.685 | 115 | CSAH 101 / US 169 Bus. south to MN 13 – Savage, Shakopee | Southbound exit and northbound entrance only |
| Minnesota River | | 115.698– 116.128 | 186.198– 186.890 | Bloomington Ferry Bridge; Scott–Hennepin county line | | |
| Hennepin | Bloomington | 116.369 | 187.278 | 117 | CSAH 1 east (Old Shakopee Road) / Riverview Road | Southern end of CSAH 1 concurrency |
| Hennepin | Bloomington | 117.121 | 188.488 | — | CSAH 1 west (Pioneer Trail) | Northern end of CSAH 1 concurrency |
| Hennepin | Bloomington | 118.436 | 190.604 | — | Bloomington Ferry Road, Anderson Lakes Parkway | |
| Hennepin | Bloomington | 119.969 | 193.071 | — | Washington Avenue, Marth Road | Northbound exit and southbound entrance |
| Hennepin | Bloomington | 120.023 | 193.158 | — | I-494 / MN 5 | I-494 exit 10 |
| Hennepin | Bloomington–Edina line | 120.801 | 194.410 | — | 78th Street | Southbound exit only |
| Hennepin | Edina | 120.971 | 194.684 | — | Valley View Road | |
| Hennepin | Edina–Eden Prairie line | 122.189– 122.198 | 196.644– 196.659 | — | US 212 west / MN 62 (Crosstown Highway) | |
| Hennepin | Edina–Eden Prairie line | 122.784 | 197.602 | — | Londonderry Road, Bren Road | |
| Hennepin | Hopkins–Edina line | 123.789 | 199.219 | — | 5th Street South, Lincoln Drive | |
| Hennepin | Hopkins | 124.384 | 200.177 | — | CSAH 3 – Downtown Hopkins | |
| Hennepin | Hopkins | 125.289 | 201.633 | — | MN 7 – Minneapolis, Excelsior | |
| Hennepin | St. Louis Park | 125.653 | 202.219 | — | 36th Street | Southbound exit and northbound entrance only |
| Hennepin | Minnetonka–St. Louis Park line | 126.128 | 202.983 | — | CSAH 5 (Minnetonka Boulevard) | |
| Hennepin | Minnetonka–St. Louis Park line | 126.706 | 203.914 | — | Cedar Lake Road | |
| Hennepin | Minnetonka–St. Louis Park line | 127.611 | 205.370 | — | 16th Street | Northbound exit and entrance only |
| Hennepin | St. Louis Park–Golden Valley line | 128.022 | 206.031 | — | I-394 – Minneapolis | I-394 exit 3 |
| Hennepin | Plymouth–Golden Valley line | 128.417 | 206.667 | — | Betty Crocker Drive, Shelard Parkway | |
| Hennepin | Plymouth–Golden Valley line | 128.690 | 207.106 | — | MN 55 – Minneapolis, Buffalo | |
| Hennepin | Plymouth–Golden Valley line | 129.369 | 208.199 | — | 13th Avenue, Plymouth Avenue | |
| Hennepin | Plymouth–Golden Valley– New Hope tripoint | 130.371 | 209.812 | — | CSAH 70 (Medicine Lake Road) | |
| Hennepin | Plymouth–New Hope line | 131.376 | 211.429 | — | 36th Avenue North | |
| Hennepin | Plymouth–New Hope line | 132.158 | 212.688 | — | CSAH 9 (Rockford Road) | |
| Hennepin | Plymouth–New Hope line | 132.891 | 213.867 | — | 49th Avenue North | |
| Hennepin | Maple Grove–Brooklyn Park line | 133.861 | 215.428 | — | CSAH 10 (Bass Lake Road) | |
| Hennepin | Maple Grove–Brooklyn Park line | 134.654 | 216.705 | — | 63rd Avenue North | |
| Hennepin | Maple Grove–Brooklyn Park line | 135.601 | 218.229 | — | I-94 / I-694 / US 52 | I-694 exit 29 |
| Hennepin | Maple Grove–Brooklyn Park line | 136.398 | 219.511 | — | CSAH 130 (Elm Creek Boulevard, Brooklyn Boulevard) | |
| Hennepin | Brooklyn Park | 137.572 | 221.401 | — | CSAH 81 (Bottineau Boulevard) / CSAH 109 (85th Avenue North) | |
| Hennepin | Brooklyn Park | 138.819 | 223.408 | — | CSAH 30 (93rd Avenue North) | Northbound exit and southbound entrance |
| Hennepin | Brooklyn Park | 139.328 | 224.227 | — | MN 610 | |
| Hennepin | Brooklyn Park | 139.808 | 224.999 | — | 101st Avenue North | Northern end of freeway section |
| Hennepin | Champlin | 142.816 | 229.840 | | Great River Road (National Route) south / West River Road / Dean Avenue | Southern end of Great River Road concurency |
| Hennepin | Champlin | 142.900 | 229.975 | | CSAH 12 / Great River Road (National Route) north / Dayton Road / Miller Road | Northern end of Great River Road concurrency |
| Mississippi River | | 143.339– 143.535 | 230.682– 230.997 | Anoka–Champlin Mississippi River Bridge | | |
| Anoka | Anoka | 144.400 | 232.389 | 224B | US 10 east / MN 47 | Southern end of US 10 concurrency; southern end of freeway section |
| Anoka | Anoka | 144.923 | 233.231 | 224A | Main Street, Greenhaven Road | |
| Anoka | Anoka | | | 223 | Cutters Grove Avenue, Thurston Avenue | |
| Anoka | Ramsey | | | 222 | CSAH 57 (Sunfish Lake Boulevard NW) | |
| Anoka | Ramsey | | | 221 | CSAH 56 (Ramsey Boulevard NW) | |
| Anoka | Ramsey | | | 220 | CSAH 83 (Armstrong Boulevard NW) | |
| Sherburne | Elk River | 155.703 | 250.580 | — | US 10 west / MN 101 south – Elk River, Rogers | Northern end of US 10 concurrency |
| Sherburne | Elk River | 156.642 | 252.091 | – | CSAH 12 (Main Street) | Interchange opened in 2024; former at-grade intersection with traffic lights |
| Sherburne | Elk River | 157.261 | 253.087 | – | School Street / Elk Hills Drive | Interchange opened in 2023; former at-grade intersection with traffic lights |
| Sherburne | Elk River | 157.991 | 254.262 | – | Jackson Street / 193rd Avenue | Interchange opened in 2023; former at-grade intersection with traffic lights |
| Sherburne | Elk River | 158.491 | 255.067 | – | 197th Avenue | Southbound exit and northbound entrance opened in 2022; former at-grade intersection with traffic lights |
| Sherburne | Elk River | 159.349 | 256.447 | — | CSAH 33 | Interchange |
| Sherburne | Zimmerman | 165.509 | 266.361 | — | CSAH 4 (Fremont Avenue) | Roundabout interchange under construction |
| Sherburne | Baldwin Township | 170.726 | 274.757 | — | CSAH 9 | Interchange |
| Sherburne | Princeton | 174.343 | 280.578 | — | CSAH 29 north (South Rum River Drive) | Interchange; access to M Health Fairview Northland Medical Center |
| Mille Lacs | Princeton | 176.205 | 283.574 | — | MN 95 – St. Cloud, Princeton | Interchange |
| Mille Lacs | Princeton | 177.423 | 285.535 | — | CSAH 29 south (Rum River Drive) | Interchange |
| Mille Lacs | Milaca | 189.035 | 304.222 | — | MN 23 – Milaca | Interchange |
| Mille Lacs | Onamia | 211.156 | 339.823 | | MN 27 west – Pierz | Southern end of MN 27 concurrency; access to Onamia Hospital |
| Mille Lacs | Cove | 213.745 | 343.989 | | MN 27 east / Lake Mille Lacs Scenic Byway – Wahkon, Isle | Northern end of MN 27 concurrency |
| Crow Wing | Garrison | 231.395 | 372.394 | | MN 18 west to MN 6 – Deerwood, Brainerd | Southern end of MN 18 concurrency |
| Aitkin | Hazelton Township | 236.536 | 380.668 | | MN 18 east / Lake Mille Lacs Scenic Byway – Malmo | Northern end of MN 18 concurrency |
| Aitkin | Aitkin | 249.648 | 401.770 | | MN 47 south – Malmo | Access to Aitkin Hospital |
| Aitkin | Aitkin | 250.159 | 402.592 | | MN 210 west – Crosby, Brainerd | Southern end of MN 210 concurrency |
| Aitkin | Hassman | 258.066 | 415.317 | | MN 210 east – McGregor, Duluth | Northern end of MN 210 concurrency |
| Aitkin | Morrison Township | 261.361 | 420.620 | | CSAH 21 / Great River Road (National Route) south | Southern end of Great River Road concurrency |
| Aitkin | Morrison Township | 262.685 | 422.751 | | CSAH 10 / Great River Road (National Route) north | Northern end of Great River Road concurrency |
| Aitkin | Hill City | 284.599 | 458.018 | | MN 200 – Remer, Jacobson | |
| Itasca | Grand Rapids | 302.803 | 487.314 | | US 2 west (NW 4th Street) – Bemidji | Southern end of US 2 concurrency |
| Itasca | Grand Rapids | 303.234 | 488.008 | | US 2 east – Duluth | Northern end of US 2 concurrency |
| Itasca | Pengilly | 321.160 | 516.857 | | MN 65 south | Southern end of MN 65 concurrency |
| Itasca | Nashwauk | 323.814 | 521.128 | | MN 65 north – Littlefork | Northern end of MN 65 concurrency |
| St. Louis | Hibbing | 334.057 | 537.613 | | MN 73 south – Floodwood | |
| St. Louis | Hibbing | 335.055 | 539.219 | – | 1st Avenue (US 169 Bus.) | |
| St. Louis | Hibbing | 335.763 | 540.358 | | MN 37 east (40th Street) – Eveleth | |
| St. Louis | Hibbing | 337.698 | 543.472 | | Howard Street (US 169 Bus.) | |
| St. Louis | Chisholm | 342.391 | 551.025 | – | MN 73 north – Chisholm | Northern end of MN 73 concurrency; northbound exit and southbound entrance |
| St. Louis | Mountain Iron | 356.922 | 574.410 | – | CR 102 | |
| St. Louis | Virginia | 359.462 | 578.498 | | US 53 – Duluth, International Falls | Interchange; national northern end of US 169; access to Virginia Hospital |
1.000 mi = 1.609 km; 1.000 km = 0.621 mi: Closed/former; Concurrency terminus; Proposed; Incomplete access

== See also ==
U.S. Route 169
| Previous state: Iowa | Minnesota | Next state: Terminus |
