= Cedar Lake, Minnesota =

Cedar Lake
- Unincorporated community
- Location within Minnesota Location within the United States
- Coordinates: 44°35′14″N 93°26′25″W
- Country: United States
- State: Minnesota
- County: Scott
- Township: Cedar Lake Township
- Elevation: 942 ft (287 m)
- Time zone: UTC-6 (Central (CST))
  - Summer (DST): UTC-5 (CDT)
- ZIP code: 56071, 55372, 55088, and 55020
- Area code: 952
- GNIS feature ID: 654637

Cedar Lake is an unincorporated community in Cedar Lake Township, Scott County, Minnesota, United States, near New Prague and Elko New Market. The community is located along Scott County Road 23 near 250th Street East.
