= Sand Creek (Minnesota River tributary) =

- Mouth of the Sand Creek

Location
- Country: United States
- State: Minnesota
- Counties: Le Sueur, Scott

Physical characteristics
- Source
  - location: Montgomery, Minnesota
  - coordinates: 44.4788522°N 93.5571747°W
- Mouth
  - location: Jordan, Minnesota
  - coordinates: 44°44′53″N 93°36′50″W

Basin features
- River system: Minnesota River

Sand Creek is a 36.6-mile-long (58.9 km) tributary of the Minnesota River in Le Sueur and Scott counties, Minnesota, United States. It rises at the outlet of Lake Sanborn, 2 miles (3 km) northeast of the city of Montgomery, and flows north past New Prague, entering the Minnesota River just north of Jordan.

Sand Creek was so named on account of the white sandstone rock formations near the creek.

== See also ==
- List of rivers of Minnesota
- List of longest streams of Minnesota
