= Hanrahan Lake =

Lake in the state of Minnesota, United States

- Location within Minnesota Location within the United States
- Location: Scott County, Minnesota
- Coordinates: 44°43′39″N 93°20′26″W
- Type: lake
- Basin countries: United States
- Surface area: 67 acres (27 ha)
- Max. depth: 7 ft (2.1 m)
- Surface elevation: 879 ft (268 m)<reaf name=gnis/>
- Islands: Dindissi Island

Hanrahan Lake is a lake in Scott County, in the U.S. state of Minnesota.

Hanrahan Lake was named for Edward Hanrahan, a pioneer who settled there.
