= Lydia, Minnesota =

Lydia
- Unincorporated community
- Location within Minnesota Location within the United States
- Coordinates: 44°39′10″N 93°30′04″W
- Country: United States
- State: Minnesota
- County: Scott
- Township: Spring Lake Township
- Elevation: 948 ft (289 m)
- Time zone: UTC-6 (Central (CST))
  - Summer (DST): UTC-5 (CDT)
- ZIP code: 55352
- Area code: 952
- GNIS feature ID: 647314

Lydia is an unincorporated community in Spring Lake Township, Scott County, Minnesota, United States.

The community is located south-southwest of the city of Prior Lake near the junction of Langford Avenue (Highway 13) and Scott County Road 10. Author Cora Sutton Castle (1880-1966) was born at Lydia.

Nearby places include Jordan and Prior Lake.
