= St. Benedict, Minnesota =

St. Benedict
- Unincorporated community
- Location within Minnesota Location within the United States
- Coordinates: 44°35′17″N 93°36′50″W
- Country: United States
- State: Minnesota
- County: Scott
- Township: Helena Township
- Elevation: 919 ft (280 m)
- Time zone: UTC-6 (Central (CST))
  - Summer (DST): UTC-5 (CDT)
- ZIP code: 56071
- Area code: 952
- GNIS feature ID: 654923

St. Benedict is an unincorporated community in Helena Township, Scott County, Minnesota, United States. The community is located along 250th Street West at St. Benedict Road near New Prague.

The West Branch of Raven Stream and the East Branch of Raven Stream meet at St. Benedict.
