= O'Dowd Lake =

Lake in the state of Minnesota, United States

- Location within Minnesota
- Location: Scott County, Minnesota
- Coordinates: 44°44′30″N 93°31′0″W
- Type: lakes

O'Dowd Lake is a lake in Scott County, in the U.S. state of Minnesota.

O'Dowd Lake bears the name of the three O'Dowd brothers, pioneers who settled there.

== See also ==
- List of lakes in Minnesota
