= Belle Plaine Township, Scott County, Minnesota =

Belle Plaine Township, Minnesota
- Township
- Location within the state of Minnesota Belle Plaine Township, Minnesota (the United States)
- Coordinates: 44°34′47″N 93°42′35″W
- Country: United States
- State: Minnesota
- County: Scott

Area
  - Total: 39.2 sq mi (101.6 km^{2})
  - Land: 39.2 sq mi (101.6 km^{2})
  - Water: 0 sq mi (0.0 km^{2})
- Elevation: 991 ft (302 m)

Population (2020)
  - Total: 863
- Time zone: UTC-6 (Central (CST))
  - Summer (DST): UTC-5 (CDT)
- ZIP code: 56011
- Area code: 952
- FIPS code: 27-04852
- GNIS feature ID: 0663556
- Website: https://belleplainetownship.com/

Belle Plaine Township is a township in Scott County, Minnesota, United States. The population was 863 at the 2020 census.

== History ==
Belle Plaine Township was established in the 1850s. Belle Plaine is a name derived from French meaning "beautiful plain".

== Geography ==
According to the United States Census Bureau, the township has a total area of 39.2 square miles (102 km^{2}), all land.

== Demographics ==
As of the census of 2000, there were 806 people, 266 households, and 222 families residing in the township. The population density was 20.6 inhabitants per square mile (8.0/km^{2}). There were 275 housing units at an average density of 7.0 per square mile (2.7/km^{2}). The racial makeup of the township was 98.26% White, 0.37% Native American, 0.50% Asian, 0.25% from other races, and 0.62% from two or more races. Hispanic or Latino of any race were 0.37% of the population.

There were 266 households, out of which 41.7% had children under the age of 18 living with them, 74.4% were married couples living together, 4.1% had a female householder with no husband present, and 16.5% were non-families. 13.5% of all households were made up of individuals, and 4.5% had someone living alone who was 65 years of age or older. The average household size was 3.03 and the average family size was 3.31.

In the township the population was spread out, with 30.1% under the age of 18, 6.5% from 18 to 24, 29.7% from 25 to 44, 21.8% from 45 to 64, and 11.9% who were 65 years of age or older. The median age was 37 years. For every 100 females, there were 101.5 males. For every 100 females age 18 and over, there were 114.1 males.

The median income for a household in the township was $51,000, and the median income for a family was $53,462. Males had a median income of $36,793 versus $29,375 for females. The per capita income for the township was $18,621. About 5.7% of families and 5.3% of the population were below the poverty line, including 5.4% of those under age 18 and 8.8% of those age 65 or over.
