= Jackson Township, Scott County, Minnesota =

Jackson Township, Minnesota
- Township
- Location of Jackson Township within Scott County, Minnesota
- Coordinates: 44°46′12″N 93°33′4″W
- Country: United States of America
- State: Minnesota
- County: Scott

Area
  - Total: 7.2 sq mi (18.6 km^{2})
  - Land: 7.0 sq mi (18.1 km^{2})
  - Water: 0.19 sq mi (0.5 km^{2})
- Elevation: 935 ft (285 m)

Population (2020)
  - Total: 1,616
- Time zone: UTC-6 (Central (CST))
  - Summer (DST): UTC-5 (CDT)
- FIPS code: 27-31580
- GNIS feature ID: 0664569

Jackson Township is a township in Scott County, Minnesota, United States. Organized in 1858, Jackson Township's population was 1,616 at the 2020 census. While the origin of its name is not recorded, it is most likely named after President Andrew Jackson.

== Geography ==
According to the United States Census Bureau, the township had an area of 7.2 square miles (19 km^{2}) in 2000, of which 7.0 square miles (18 km^{2}) was land and 0.2 square miles (0.52 km^{2}) (2.65%) was water. While the township formerly included a large area south of Shakopee, that has since been annexed by the city, and it is reduced to a smaller area to the west of the city. Within Scott County, it borders Shakopee and Louisville Township, and across the Minnesota River in Carver County is Chaska and Chanhassen.

== Demographics ==
As of the census of 2000, the township has 1,361 people, 461 households, and 349 families. The population density was 195.2 inhabitants per square mile (75.4/km^{2}). There were 501 housing units at an average density of 71.9 per square mile (27.8/km^{2}). The township's racial makeup was 85.82% White, 0.22% African American, 1.10% Native American, 1.54% Asian, 10.07% from other races, and 1.25% from two or more races. Hispanic or Latino of any race were 21.90% of the population.

There were 461 households, of which 39.3% had children under the age of 18 living with them, 60.3% were married couples living together, 10.0% had a female householder with no husband present, and 24.1% were non-families. 17.1% of all households were made up of individuals, and 2.4% had someone living alone who was 65 years of age or older. The average household size was 2.95 and the average family size was 3.30.

28.9% of the township's population was under age 18, 9.4% was from age 18 to 24, 34.1% was from age 25 to 44, 21.7% was from age 45 to 64, and 5.9% was age 65 or older. The median age was 33 years. For every 100 females, there were 111.0 males. For every 100 females age 18 and over, there were 114.2 males.

The township's median household income was $50,263, and the median family income was $53,611. Males had a median income of $32,500 versus $26,583 for females. The township's per capita income was $22,802. About 9.9% of families and 12.0% of the population were below the poverty line, including 15.5% of those under age 18 and 2.4% of those age 65 or over.
