= St. Lawrence Township, Scott County, Minnesota =

St. Lawrence Township, Minnesota
- Township
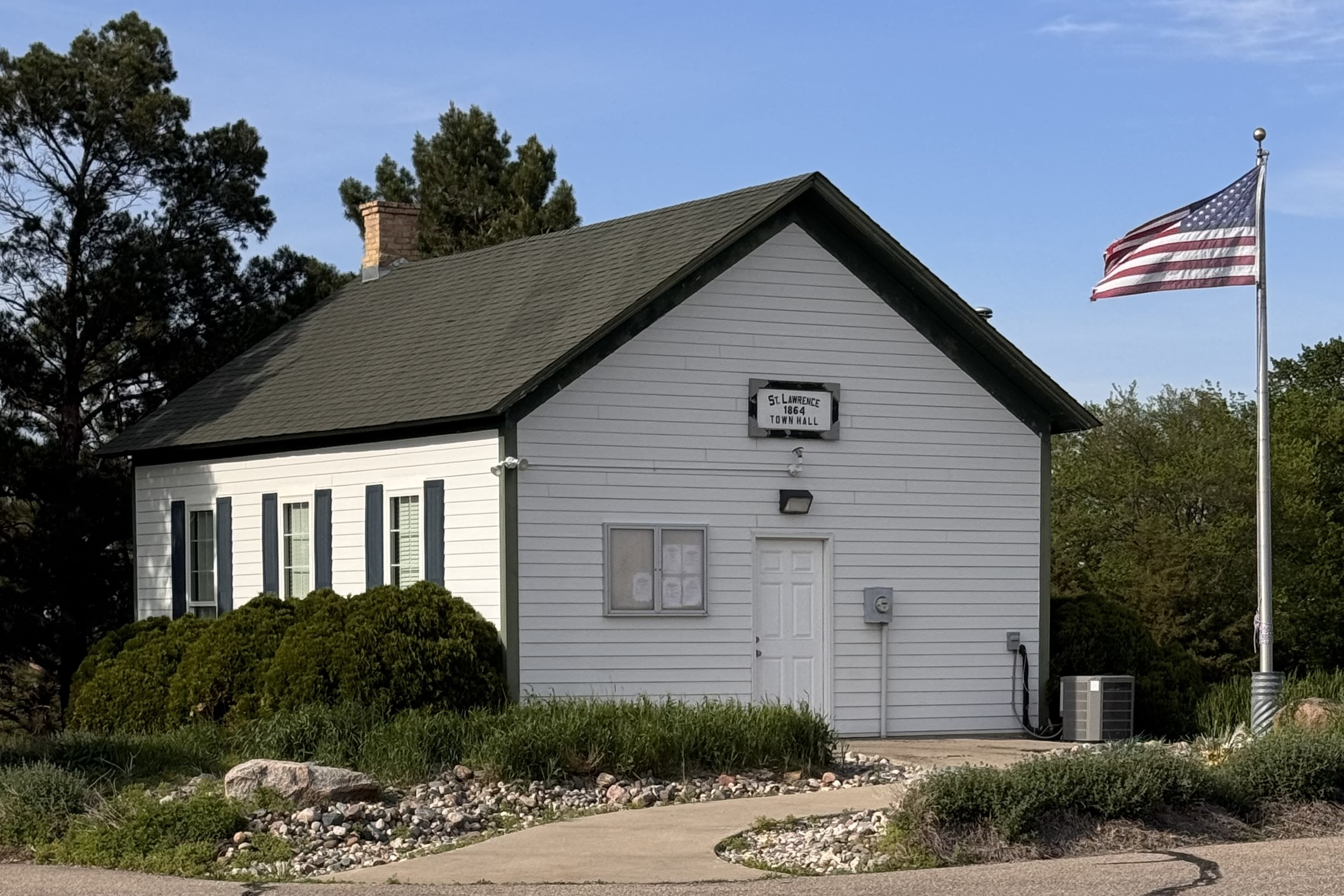
- St. Lawrence Township Hall, built in 1864

- Location within the state of Minnesota St. Lawrence Township, Minnesota (the United States)
- Coordinates: 44°38′50″N 93°40′30″W
- Country: United States
- State: Minnesota
- County: Scott

Area
  - Total: 14.9 sq mi (38.6 km^{2})
  - Land: 14.4 sq mi (37.4 km^{2})
  - Water: 0.46 sq mi (1.2 km^{2})
- Elevation: 790 ft (240 m)

Population (2020)
  - Total: 492
- Time zone: UTC-6 (Central (CST))
  - Summer (DST): UTC-5 (CDT)
- FIPS code: 27-57184
- GNIS feature ID: 0665519
- Website: https://stlawrencetownshipmn.org/

St. Lawrence Township is a township in Scott County, Minnesota, United States. The population was 492 at the 2020 census.

== History ==
St. Lawrence Township was organized in 1858.

== Geography ==
According to the United States Census Bureau, the township has an area of 14.9 square miles (38.6 km^{2}), of which 14.4 square miles (37.3 km^{2}) is land and 0.5 square mile (1.2 km^{2}) (3.16%) is water.

== Demographics ==
As of the census of 2000, the township had 472 people, 144 households, and 128 families. The population density was 32.7 inhabitants per square mile (12.6/km^{2}). There were 147 housing units at an average density of 10.2/sq mi (3.9/km^{2}). The township's racial makeup was 96.61% White, 1.06% Native American, 1.06% Asian, 1.06% from other races, and 0.21% from two or more races. Hispanic or Latino of any race were 1.48% of the population.

There were 144 households, of which 45.1% had children under the age of 18 living with them, 82.6% were married couples living together, 2.1% had a female householder with no husband present, and 11.1% were non-families. 8.3% of all households were made up of individuals, and 1.4% had someone living alone who was 65 years of age or older. The average household size was 3.28 and the average family size was 3.45.

32.6% of the township's population was under age 18, 5.1% was from age 18 to 24, 32.6% was from age 25 to 44, 25.4% was from age 45 to 64, and 4.2% was age 65 or older. The median age was 36 years. For every 100 females, there were 113.6 males. For every 100 females age 18 and over, there were 112.0 males.

The township's median household income was $66,750, and the median family income was $67,375. Males had a median income of $43,625 versus $32,708 for females. The township's per capita income was $23,825. None of the families and 0.8% of the population were living below the poverty line, including no one under age 18 or over age 64.
