= Sand Creek Township, Scott County, Minnesota =

Sand Creek Township, Minnesota
- Township
- Location within the state of Minnesota Sand Creek Township, Minnesota (the United States)
- Coordinates: 44°40′41″N 93°35′15″W
- Country: United States
- State: Minnesota
- County: Scott

Area
  - Total: 32.9 sq mi (85.1 km^{2})
  - Land: 32.4 sq mi (84.0 km^{2})
  - Water: 0.46 sq mi (1.2 km^{2})
- Elevation: 955 ft (291 m)

Population (2020)
  - Total: 1,497
- Time zone: UTC-6 (Central (CST))
  - Summer (DST): UTC-5 (CDT)
- FIPS code: 27-58324
- GNIS feature ID: 0665541
- Website: https://sandcreekmn.gov/

Sand Creek Township is a township in Scott County, Minnesota, United States. The population was 1,497 at the 2020 census.

== History ==
Sand Creek Township was originally called Douglas Township, and under the latter name was organized in 1858. Several months later it was renamed St. Mary Township. The name was again changed in 1859, after the Sand Creek.

== Geography ==
According to the United States Census Bureau, the township has a total area of 32.9 square miles (85.2 km^{2}), of which 32.4 square miles (84.0 km^{2}) is land and 0.5 square mile (1.2 km^{2}) (1.40%) is water.

== Demographics ==
As of the census of 2000, there were 1,551 people, 478 households, and 391 families residing in the township. The population density was 47.8 inhabitants per square mile (18.5/km^{2}). There were 488 housing units at an average density of 15.1/sq mi (5.8/km^{2}). The racial makeup of the township was 97.16% White, 1.42% African American, 0.32% Native American, 0.06% Pacific Islander, 0.58% from other races, and 0.45% from two or more races. Hispanic or Latino of any race were 1.10% of the population.

There were 478 households, out of which 40.6% had children under the age of 18 living with them, 75.1% were married couples living together, 4.0% had a female householder with no husband present, and 18.2% were non-families. 12.8% of all households were made up of individuals, and 4.4% had someone living alone who was 65 years of age or older. The average household size was 3.01 and the average family size was 3.31.

In the township the population was spread out, with 27.3% under the age of 18, 7.2% from 18 to 24, 32.2% from 25 to 44, 24.1% from 45 to 64, and 9.1% who were 65 years of age or older. The median age was 37 years. For every 100 females, there were 121.6 males. For every 100 females age 18 and over, there were 127.2 males.

The median income for a household in the township was $65,370, and the median income for a family was $67,000. Males had a median income of $41,591 versus $27,784 for females. The per capita income for the township was $23,029. About 1.2% of families and 2.0% of the population were below the poverty line, including 2.0% of those under age 18 and 1.8% of those age 65 or over.
