= Scott County, Minnesota =

County in Minnesota, United States

- County
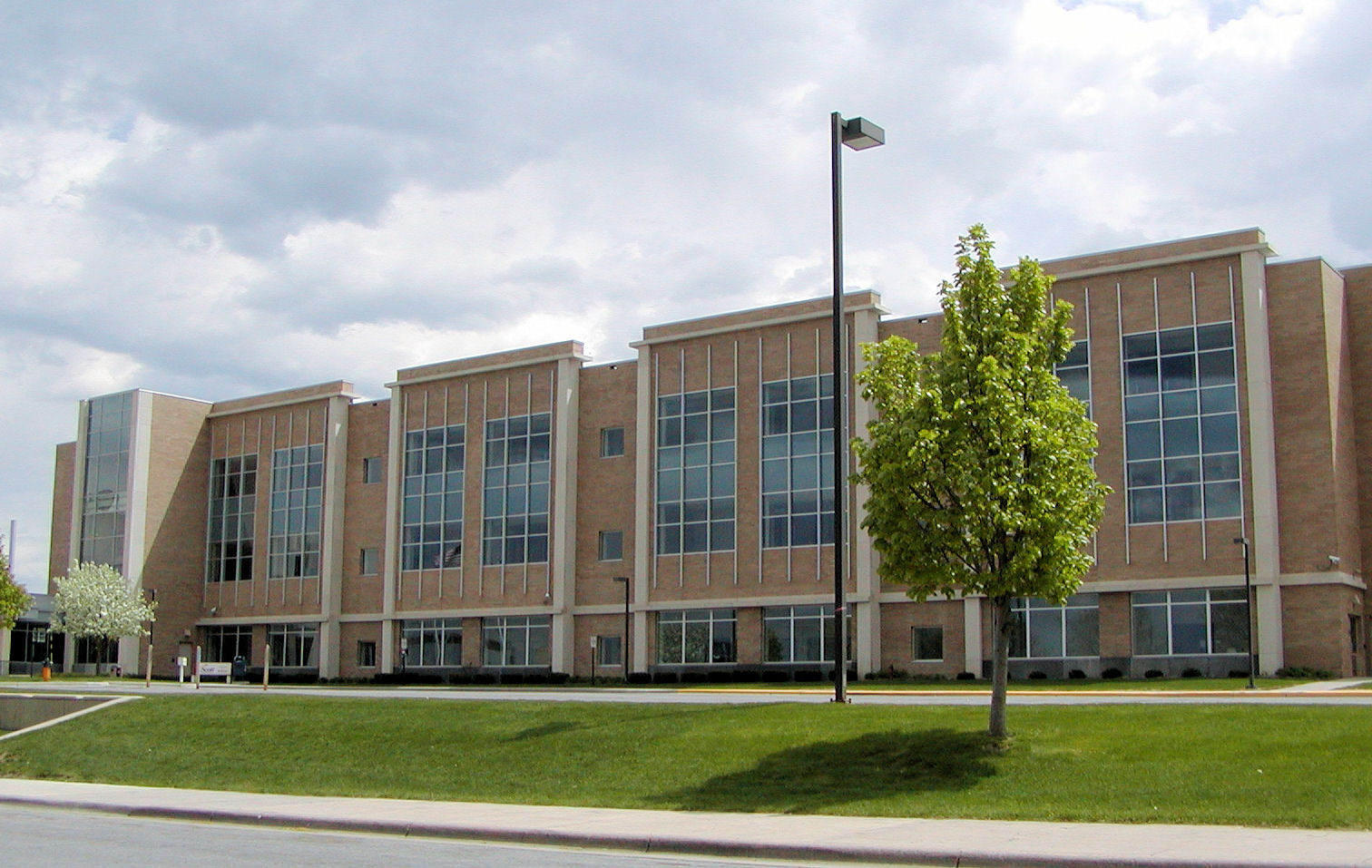
- Scott County Government Center

- Logo

- Location within the U.S. state of Minnesota
- Coordinates: 44°39′N 93°32′W
- Country: United States
- State: Minnesota
- Founded: March 5, 1853
- Named for: Winfield Scott
- Seat: Shakopee
- Largest city: Shakopee

Area
  - Total: 368 sq mi (950 km^{2})
  - Land: 356 sq mi (920 km^{2})
  - Water: 12 sq mi (31 km^{2}) 3.2%

Population (2020)
  - Total: 150,928
  - Estimate (2025): 159,017 ▲
  - Density: 424/sq mi (164/km^{2})
- Time zone: UTC−6 (Central)
  - Summer (DST): UTC−5 (CDT)
- Congressional district: 2nd
- Website: www.scottcountymn.gov

Scott County is a county in the U.S. state of Minnesota. As of the 2020 census, the population was 150,928. Its county seat is Shakopee. The county was organized in 1853 and named in honor of General Winfield Scott. Scott County is part of the Minneapolis-St. Paul-Bloomington, MN-WI Metropolitan Statistical Area. It is a member of the Metropolitan Council, and shares many of the council's concerns about responsible growth management, advocating for progressive development concepts such as clustering, open-space design, and the preservation of open space and rural/agricultural land.

The Shakopee-Mdewakanton Indian Reservation is entirely within the county and within the cities of Prior Lake and Shakopee. Due to its proximity to major cities, the tribe has earned significant revenue at its gaming casinos and hotel; it has used funds to reinvest in economic development for the tribe and other initiatives.

Historically, the Minnesota River supported the county's fur trading, lumbering, and farming industries in the 19th century. Today, Scott County experiences a growing mix of commercial, industrial, and housing development, but is still primarily rural. Scott County is home to several historical, scenic, and entertainment destinations including Canterbury Park, The Landing, Minnesota's Largest Candy Store, Elko Speedway, Mystic Lake Casino run by the Shakopee-Mdewakanton Dakota; the Renaissance Festival, and Valleyfair Amusement Park.

== History ==
Scott County was first inhabited by two bands of the Santee Sioux (Dakota) Indians, the Mdewakanton and Wahpeton. Their semi-nomadic life followed a seasonal cycle. They gathered food, hunted, fished, and planted corn. In the summer the Dakota villages were occupied but in the winter the groups separated for hunting. They had many permanent villages along the Minnesota River. They had many trails leading to these settlements and to the Red River Valley in the North, and the Prairie du Chien to the Southeast. These trails were later used by the fur traders and settlers, and were known as the "ox cart trails." The area of Scott County, as well as much of southern Minnesota, was opened for settlement by two treaties signed at Mendota and Traverse des Sioux, in 1851 and 1853. These treaties removed the Dakota Indians to reservations in upper Minnesota.

Soils of Scott County

Scott County was established and organized by an Act passed in the legislature on March 5, 1853. The 369-square-mile (960 km^{2}) county was named after General Winfield Scott. Settlers started entering the area in the mid-1850s. The Minnesota River and the ox cart trails were the primary transportation routes. The first settlers were Yankees, followed by groups of Germans, Irish, Czechs, and Scandinavians. They each brought their own traditions and religions. Most of these settlers became farmers. Fur trading, lumbering, and farming were Minnesota's major industries all throughout the 19th century. With the fast-growing farms, towns sprang up. Shakopee, the county seat, began in 1851 as a trading post by the Dakota Village of Chief Shakopee (or Shakpay). Other towns were established alongside transportation routes. When the railroads came to Minnesota, they became the primary mode of transportation, and eventually highways were developed along the ox cart trails between the communities.

Due to suburbanization, this once-rural county is changing dramatically. Cities are continually growing, as evidenced by an increase in population from roughly 90,000 in 2000 to more than 150,000 today, making Scott County one of Minnesota's fastest-growing counties.

== Geography ==
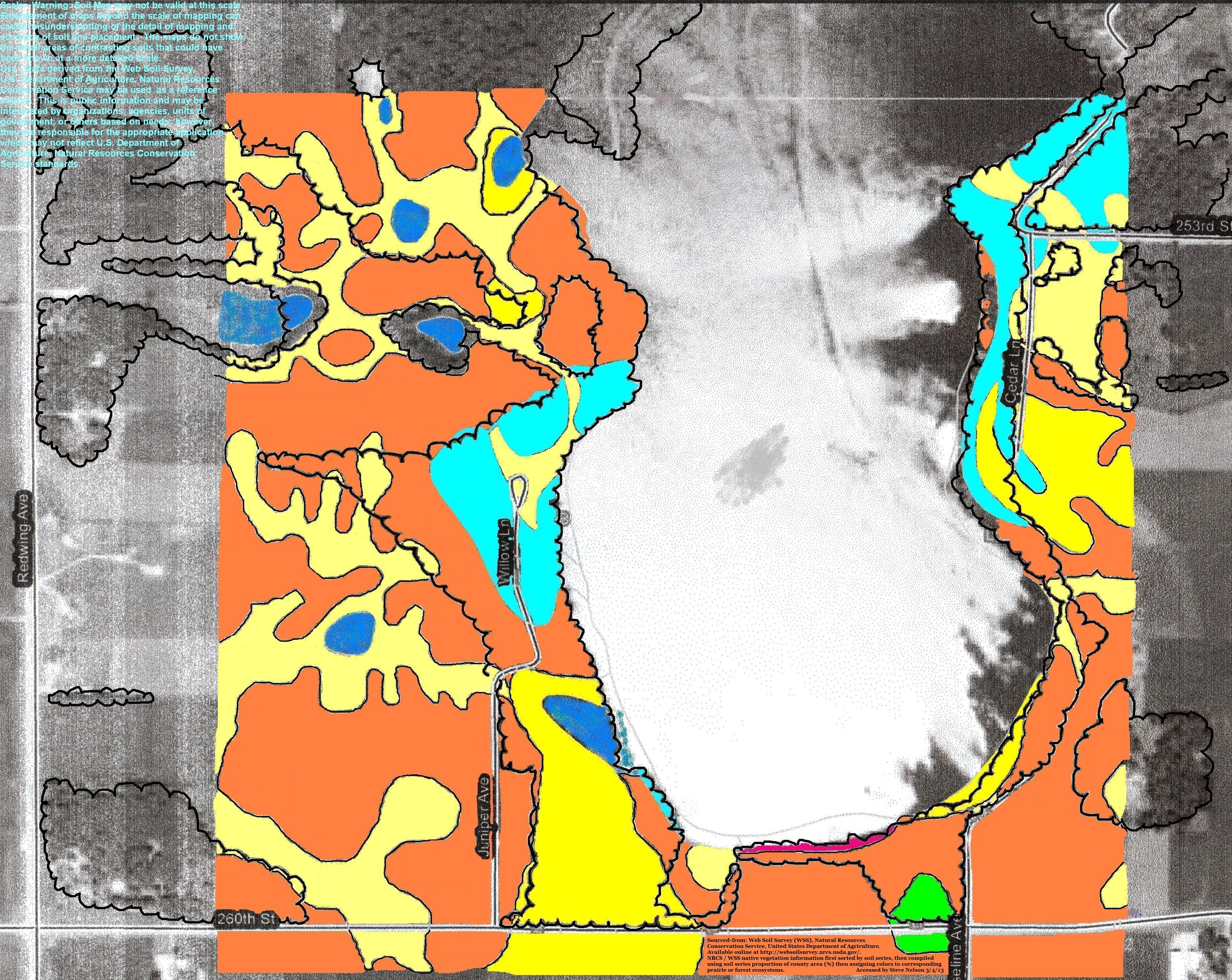
Soils of Cedar Lake Regional Park area

According to the United States Census Bureau, the county has an area of 368 square miles (950 km^{2}), of which 356 square miles (920 km^{2}) is land and 12 square miles (31 km^{2}) (3.2%) is water. It is the third-smallest county in Minnesota by land area and second-smallest by total area.

The Minnesota River is the county's boundary in both the north and the west. The broad river valley juts through glacial sediment into some of the oldest rock known. Now mostly farmland, it was an oak savanna and a mixture of grass and clusters of trees that grew parallel to the river valley. The savanna bordered the "Big Woods," a "closed-forest savanna" that covered most of Minnesota before it was logged in the mid-19th century. Scott is one of 17 Minnesota savanna counties with more savanna soils than either forest or prairie soils. One example of native vegetation in Scott County:

=== Lakes ===
- Ahlswede Lake: in St. Lawrence Township
- Blue Lake: in Jackson Township
- Browns Lake: in St. Lawrence Township
- Campbell Lake: in Spring Lake Township
- Cedar Lake: western two-thirds is in Helena Township; eastern third is in Cedar Lake Township
- Cedar Lake: there is a smaller Cedar Lake in the eastern part of Cedar Lake Township
- Clark Lake: in Blakely Township
- Cleary Lake: mostly in Credit River; the western part stretches into Spring Lake Township
- Crystal Lake: in Spring Lake Township
- Cynthia Lake: northern two thirds is in Spring Lake Township; the rest is in Cedar Township
- Deans Lake: in Jackson Township
- Fish Lake: in Spring Lake Township
- Fisher Lake: in Jackson Township
- Gifford Lake: in Jackson Township
- Hanrahan Lake: in Jackson Township
- Hickey Lake: eastern two thirds is in Helena Township; western third is in Cedar Lake Township
- Horseshoe Lake: in St. Lawrence Township
- Howard Lake: in Jackson Township
- Kane Lake: in Spring Lake Township
- Lennon Lake: in Cedar Lake Township
- Lower Prior Lake: in the city of Prior Lake
- Markley Lake: eastern half is in Credit River; the western half is in Prior Lake
- McMahon Lake: in Spring Lake Township
- Mud Lake: in Cedar Lake Township
- Murphy Lake: in Credit River
- O'Dowd Lake: western third is in Louisville Township; eastern two thirds is in Jackson Township
- Pike Lake: in Jackson Township
- Pleasant Lake: in Helena Township
- Rice Lake: west half is in Cedar Lake Township; east half is in Dakota County
- Rice Lake: there is another Rice Lake in Jackson Township
- Rice Lake: there is a third Rice Lake in Spring Lake Township
- Schneider Lake: in Louisville Township
- Spring Lake: in Spring Lake Township and Prior Lake
- St. Catherine Lake: in Cedar Lake Township
- Thole Lake: in Louisville Township
- Upper Prior Lake: in Prior Lake

=== Major highways ===
- Interstate 35
- U.S. Highway 169
- Minnesota State Highway 13
- Minnesota State Highway 19
- Minnesota State Highway 21
- Minnesota State Highway 25
- Minnesota State Highway 41
- Minnesota State Highway 282
- County Road 42
- County Road 101
- Other County Roads

=== Adjacent counties ===
- Hennepin County (north)
- Dakota County (east)
- Rice County (southeast)
- Le Sueur County (southwest)
- Sibley County (west)
- Carver County (northwest)

=== National protected area ===
- Minnesota Valley National Wildlife Refuge (part)

== Demographics ==
Historical population
Census	Pop.	Note	%±
1860	4,595		—
1870	11,042		140.3%
1880	13,516		22.4%
1890	13,831		2.3%
1900	15,147		9.5%
1910	14,888		−1.7%
1920	14,245		−4.3%
1930	14,116		−0.9%
1940	15,585		10.4%
1950	16,486		5.8%
1960	21,909		32.9%
1970	32,423		48.0%
1980	43,784		35.0%
1990	57,846		32.1%
2000	89,498		54.7%
2010	129,928		45.2%
2020	150,928		16.2%
2025 (est.)	159,017	▲	5.4%
U.S. Decennial Census; 1790-1960 1900-1990; 1990-2000 2010-2020

=== 2020 census ===
As of the 2020 census, the county had a population of 150,928. The median age was 37.5 years. 27.1% of residents were under the age of 18 and 11.7% of residents were 65 years of age or older. For every 100 females there were 98.5 males, and for every 100 females age 18 and over there were 97.0 males age 18 and over.

The racial makeup of the county was 77.7% White, 5.4% Black or African American, 1.1% American Indian and Alaska Native, 6.6% Asian, <0.1% Native Hawaiian and Pacific Islander, 2.9% from some other race, and 6.2% from two or more races. Hispanic or Latino residents of any race comprised 6.0% of the population.

81.9% of residents lived in urban areas, while 18.1% lived in rural areas.

There were 52,645 households in the county, of which 39.7% had children under the age of 18 living in them. Of all households, 60.8% were married-couple households, 14.0% were households with a male householder and no spouse or partner present, and 18.3% were households with a female householder and no spouse or partner present. About 18.7% of all households were made up of individuals and 7.4% had someone living alone who was 65 years of age or older.

There were 54,658 housing units, of which 3.7% were vacant. Among occupied housing units, 81.3% were owner-occupied and 18.7% were renter-occupied. The homeowner vacancy rate was 0.8% and the rental vacancy rate was 6.0%.

=== Racial and ethnic composition ===
Scott County, Minnesota – Racial and ethnic composition Note: the US Census treats Hispanic/Latino as an ethnic category. This table excludes Latinos from the racial categories and assigns them to a separate category. Hispanics/Latinos may be of any race.
Race / Ethnicity (NH = Non-Hispanic)	Pop 1980	Pop 1990	Pop 2000	Pop 2010	Pop 2020	% 1980	% 1990	% 2000	% 2010	% 2020
White alone (NH)	43,138	56,312	82,733	109,816	115,630	98.52%	97.35%	92.44%	84.52%	76.61%
Black or African American alone (NH)	61	259	802	3,298	8,137	0.14%	0.45%	0.90%	2.54%	5.39%
Native American or Alaska Native alone (NH)	194	344	664	969	1,406	0.44%	0.59%	0.74%	0.75%	0.93%
Asian alone (NH)	159	518	1,928	7,303	9,939	0.36%	0.90%	2.15%	5.62%	6.59%
Native Hawaiian or Pacific Islander alone (NH)	x	x	18	94	64	x	x	0.02%	0.07%	0.04%
Other race alone (NH)	29	6	56	243	607	0.07%	0.01%	0.06%	0.19%	0.40%
Mixed race or Multiracial (NH)	x	x	916	2,434	6,137	x	x	1.02%	1.87%	4.07%
Hispanic or Latino (any race)	203	407	2,381	5,771	9,008	0.46%	0.70%	2.66%	4.44%	5.97%
Total	43,784	57,846	89,498	129,928	150,928	100.00%	100.00%	100.00%	100.00%	100.00%

== Communities ==
=== Cities ===
- Belle Plaine
- Credit River
- Elko New Market
- Jordan
- New Prague (partly in Le Sueur County)
- Prior Lake
- Savage
- Shakopee (county seat)

=== Townships ===
- Belle Plaine Township
- Blakeley Township
- Cedar Lake Township
- Helena Township
- Jackson Township
- Louisville Township
- New Market Township
- Sand Creek Township
- Spring Lake Township
- St. Lawrence Township

=== Unincorporated communities ===
- Blakeley
- Cedar Lake
- Helena
- Lydia
- Marystown
- Mudbaden
- Spring Lake
- St. Benedict
- St. Patrick
- Union Hill

== Politics ==
United States presidential election results for Scott County, Minnesota
Year	Republican		Democratic		Third party(ies)	
Year	No.	%	No.	%	No.	%
1892	760	26.86%	1,937	68.47%	132	4.67%
1896	1,126	38.31%	1,706	58.05%	107	3.64%
1900	996	37.70%	1,588	60.11%	58	2.20%
1904	1,138	51.99%	1,021	46.64%	30	1.37%
1908	1,045	39.29%	1,548	58.20%	67	2.52%
1912	462	20.25%	1,172	51.36%	648	28.40%
1916	972	40.86%	1,361	57.21%	46	1.93%
1920	3,015	68.96%	1,253	28.66%	104	2.38%
1924	1,324	29.29%	829	18.34%	2,367	52.37%
1928	1,732	28.11%	4,419	71.71%	11	0.18%
1932	1,134	18.75%	4,878	80.64%	37	0.61%
1936	1,528	23.30%	3,861	58.87%	1,170	17.84%
1940	4,241	59.13%	2,910	40.57%	21	0.29%
1944	3,326	54.08%	2,786	45.30%	38	0.62%
1948	2,583	37.25%	4,278	61.69%	74	1.07%
1952	4,277	56.23%	3,315	43.58%	14	0.18%
1956	4,148	54.59%	3,431	45.16%	19	0.25%
1960	3,671	37.68%	6,061	62.21%	11	0.11%
1964	3,311	31.32%	7,248	68.57%	11	0.10%
1968	4,632	39.13%	6,656	56.23%	549	4.64%
1972	7,310	50.85%	6,745	46.92%	321	2.23%
1976	7,154	40.66%	9,912	56.34%	527	3.00%
1980	9,018	45.00%	9,115	45.49%	1,905	9.51%
1984	12,573	56.81%	9,452	42.71%	108	0.49%
1988	13,050	52.87%	11,405	46.20%	230	0.93%
1992	10,936	33.95%	11,225	34.84%	10,055	31.21%
1996	12,734	38.77%	14,657	44.62%	5,456	16.61%
2000	23,954	54.70%	17,503	39.97%	2,336	5.33%
2004	36,055	59.46%	23,958	39.51%	626	1.03%
2008	36,724	54.70%	29,208	43.51%	1,200	1.79%
2012	40,323	56.28%	29,712	41.47%	1,612	2.25%
2016	39,948	53.24%	28,502	37.99%	6,579	8.77%
2020	45,872	52.15%	40,040	45.52%	2,053	2.33%
2024	47,837	53.07%	40,214	44.61%	2,090	2.32%

In its early history Scott County was heavily Democratic due to being largely German Catholic and opposed to the pietistic Scandinavian Lutheran Republican Party of that era. It would never vote Republican until Theodore Roosevelt swept every Minnesota county in 1904 but anti-Woodrow Wilson feeling from World War I caused the county to shift overwhelmingly to Warren G. Harding in 1920 before swinging to Robert La Follette, coreligionist Al Smith and fellow “wet” Democrat Franklin D. Roosevelt.

In 1936 the county's isolationism gave a powerful vote to William Lemke’s Union Party, and apart from Harry Truman’s Farm Belt appeal in the 1948 election Scott County would turn Republican until another Catholic nominee, John F. Kennedy, returned it to the Democratic ranks. However, since the “Reagan Revolution”, Scott County has become solidly Republican voting, with no Democrat gaining a majority of the county's vote since Jimmy Carter in 1976, although Carter in 1980 and Bill Clinton in 1992 and 1996 won pluralities.

Although a conservative stronghold in modern times, the suburban voters of Scott County, like those elsewhere, tend to be more liberal on social issues. For example, while Mitt Romney handily won Scott County in 2012, voters also rejected a proposed amendment to the Minnesota constitution that would have banned same-sex marriage.

=== Federal government ===
U.S. House

- Angie Craig (D-MN-2)

=== State government ===
MN Senate

- Rich Draheim (R-SD-20)
- Eric Pratt (R-SD-54)
- Lindsey Port (DFL-SD-55)

MN House

- Brian Pfarr (R-HD-20A)
- Brad Tabke (DFL-HD-54A)
- Ben Bakeberg (R-HD-54B)
- Jessica Hanson (DFL-HD-55A)

Scott County is Located in the First Judicial District of Minnesota District Court.

=== County government ===
Executive

- Attorney's Office: Ron Hocevar
- Sheriff's Office: Luke Hennen

Hennepin County, Dakota County, and Scott County share a joint Medical Examiner

Legislative: Scott County Board of Commissioners

- Barb Weckman Brekke (1)
- Tom Wolf (2)
- Jody Brennan (3) -- Vice Chair
- Dave Beer (4)
- Jon Ulrich (5) -- Chair

Judicial

- Scott County's court system is Scott County District Court.

== See also ==
- National Register of Historic Places listings in Scott County, Minnesota
