= Cedar Lake Township, Scott County, Minnesota =

Cedar Lake Township, Minnesota
- Township
- Location within the state of Minnesota Cedar Lake Township, Minnesota (the United States)
- Coordinates: 44°35′14″N 93°28′12″W
- Country: United States
- State: Minnesota
- County: Scott

Area
  - Total: 36.3 sq mi (94.1 km^{2})
  - Land: 35.2 sq mi (91.1 km^{2})
  - Water: 1.2 sq mi (3.0 km^{2})
- Elevation: 981 ft (299 m)

Population (2020)
  - Total: 3,050
- Time zone: UTC-6 (Central (CST))
  - Summer (DST): UTC-5 (CDT)
- FIPS code: 27-10450
- GNIS feature ID: 0663767
- Website: https://www.cedarlaketownship.com/

Cedar Lake Township is a township in Scott County, Minnesota, United States. The population was 3,050 at the 2020 census.

Cedar Lake Township was organized in 1858, and named after Cedar Lake.

== Geography ==
According to the United States Census Bureau, the township has a total area of 36.3 square miles (94 km^{2}), of which 35.2 square miles (91 km^{2}) is land and 1.1 square miles (2.8 km^{2}) (3.16%) is water.

== Demographics ==
As of the census of 2000, there were 2,197 people, 719 households, and 611 families residing in the township. The population density was 62.4 inhabitants per square mile (24.1/km^{2}). There were 737 housing units at an average density of 20.9 per square mile (8.1/km^{2}). The racial makeup of the township was 98.45% White, 0.09% African American, 0.14% Native American, 0.50% Asian, 0.23% from other races, and 0.59% from two or more races. Hispanic or Latino of any race were 0.73% of the population.

There were 719 households, out of which 45.1% had children under the age of 18 living with them, 77.9% were married couples living together, 3.1% had a female householder with no husband present, and 15.0% were non-families. 10.8% of all households were made up of individuals, and 2.1% had someone living alone who was 65 years of age or older. The average household size was 3.06 and the average family size was 3.31.

In the township the population was spread out, with 31.5% under the age of 18, 5.3% from 18 to 24, 32.9% from 25 to 44, 23.8% from 45 to 64, and 6.5% who were 65 years of age or older. The median age was 36 years. For every 100 females, there were 103.6 males. For every 100 females age 18 and over, there were 106.0 males.

The median income for a household in the township was $75,926, and the median income for a family was $81,008. Males had a median income of $45,568 versus $31,161 for females. The per capita income for the township was $28,404. About 0.8% of families and 2.1% of the population were below the poverty line, including 1.8% of those under age 18 and 3.6% of those age 65 or over.
