= Louisville Township, Scott County, Minnesota =

Louisville Township, Minnesota
- Township
- Location within the state of Minnesota Louisville Township, Minnesota (the United States)
- Coordinates: 44°44′44″N 93°34′29″W
- Country: United States
- State: Minnesota
- County: Scott

Area
  - Total: 14.6 sq mi (37.7 km^{2})
  - Land: 13.9 sq mi (36.0 km^{2})
  - Water: 0.66 sq mi (1.7 km^{2})
- Elevation: 912 ft (278 m)

Population (2020)
  - Total: 1,342
- Time zone: UTC-6 (Central (CST))
  - Summer (DST): UTC-5 (CDT)
- FIPS code: 27-38294
- GNIS feature ID: 0664829
- Website: louisvilletownship.com

Louisville Township is a township in Scott County, Minnesota, United States. The population was 1,342 at the 2020 census.

== Geography ==
According to the United States Census Bureau, the township has a total area of 14.6 square miles (37.7 km^{2}), of which 13.9 square miles (36.0 km^{2}) is land and 0.7 square mile (1.7 km^{2}) (4.54%) is water.

== History ==
Louisville Township was organized in 1858, and named after Louisville, Kentucky.

A town of Louisville was planned during the land boom of the 1850s; however, the Panic of 1857 caused the finances of the planned town to collapse. As a result, many of the buildings were moved to Carver, directly across the Minnesota River in Carver County.

== Demographics ==
As of the census of 2000, there were 1,359 people, 410 households, and 359 families residing in the township. The population density was 97.8 inhabitants per square mile (37.8/km^{2}). There were 417 housing units at an average density of 30.0 per square mile (11.6/km^{2}). The racial makeup of the township was 86.68% White, 0.74% African American, 0.29% Native American, 1.10% Asian, 10.74% from other races, and 0.44% from two or more races. Hispanic or Latino of any race were 12.80% of the population.

There were 410 households, out of which 47.6% had children under the age of 18 living with them, 78.0% were married couples living together, 4.9% had a female householder with no husband present, and 12.4% were non-families. 7.8% of all households were made up of individuals, and 1.0% had someone living alone who was 65 years of age or older. The average household size was 3.31 and the average family size was 3.44.

In the township the population was spread out, with 32.7% under the age of 18, 7.1% from 18 to 24, 34.2% from 25 to 44, 21.7% from 45 to 64, and 4.2% who were 65 years of age or older. The median age was 34 years. For every 100 females, there were 107.8 males. For every 100 females age 18 and over, there were 110.6 males.

The median income for a household in the township was $79,242, and the median income for a family was $82,911. Males had a median income of $54,583 versus $40,000 for females. The per capita income for the township was $27,069. About 2.6% of families and 4.3% of the population were below the poverty line, including 5.3% of those under age 18 and 9.8% of those age 65 or over.
