= Helena Township, Scott County, Minnesota =

Helena Township, Minnesota
- Township
- Location within the state of Minnesota Helena Township, Minnesota (the United States)
- Coordinates: 44°35′7″N 93°34′56″W
- Country: United States
- State: Minnesota
- County: Scott

Area
  - Total: 34.7 sq mi (89.9 km^{2})
  - Land: 33.5 sq mi (86.7 km^{2})
  - Water: 1.2 sq mi (3.2 km^{2})
- Elevation: 915 ft (279 m)

Population (2020)
  - Total: 1,795
- Time zone: UTC-6 (Central (CST))
  - Summer (DST): UTC-5 (CDT)
- FIPS code: 27-28322
- GNIS feature ID: 0664443
- Website: https://helenatownshipmn.gov/

Helena Township is a township in Scott County, Minnesota, United States. The population was 1,795 at the 2020 census.

== History ==
Helena Township was organized in 1858, and named for the famed Helen of Troy.

=== Connection with Helena, Montana ===
On October 30, 1864, a group of at least seven self-appointed men met to, among other things, name the town now called Helena, Montana. Eventually, a Scotsman, John Summerville, proposed Helena, which he pronounced /həˈliːnə/ hə-LEE-nə, in honor of Helena Township. But this immediately caused an uproar from the former Confederates in the room, who insisted upon the pronunciation /ˈhɛlɪnə/ HEL-i-nə, after Helena, Arkansas. While the name "Helena" won, the pronunciation varied until approximately 1882 when the /ˈhɛlɪnə/ HEL-i-nə pronunciation became dominant.

== Geography ==
According to the United States Census Bureau, the township has a total area of 34.7 square miles (90 km^{2}), of which 33.5 square miles (87 km^{2}) is land and 1.2 square miles (3.1 km^{2}) (3.54%) is water.

== Demographics ==
As of the census of 2000, there were 1,440 people, 450 households, and 391 families residing in the township. The population density was 43.0 inhabitants per square mile (16.6/km^{2}). There were 463 housing units at an average density of 13.8 per square mile (5.3/km^{2}). The racial makeup of the township was 98.33% White, 0.35% Native American, 0.35% Asian, 0.49% from other races, and 0.49% from two or more races. Hispanic or Latino of any race were 1.39% of the population.

There were 450 households, out of which 48.7% had children under the age of 18 living with them, 80.4% were married couples living together, 3.8% had a female householder with no husband present, and 12.9% were non-families. 10.4% of all households were made up of individuals, and 4.0% had someone living alone who was 65 years of age or older. The average household size was 3.16 and the average family size was 3.41.

In the township the population was spread out, with 34.7% under the age of 18, 5.4% from 18 to 24, 29.2% from 25 to 44, 21.7% from 45 to 64, and 9.0% who were 65 years of age or older. The median age was 36 years. For every 100 females, there were 101.4 males. For every 100 females age 18 and over, there were 106.4 males.

The median income for a household in the township was $64,250, and the median income for a family was $66,591. Males had a median income of $43,235 versus $30,000 for females. The per capita income for the township was $23,059. About 2.9% of families and 3.8% of the population were below the poverty line, including 1.5% of those under age 18 and 9.1% of those age 65 or over.
