= Jordan, Minnesota =

City in Minnesota, United States

Jordan
- City
- Aerial view (2026)

- Location within Minnesota and Scott County
- Coordinates: 44°39′53″N 93°38′07″W
- Country: United States
- State: Minnesota
- County: Scott
- Founded: 1853
- Established: 1872
- Incorporated: 1891

Government
  - Mayor: Travis Fremming

Area
  - Total: 3.29 sq mi (8.53 km^{2})
  - Land: 3.27 sq mi (8.47 km^{2})
  - Water: 0.023 sq mi (0.06 km^{2})
- Elevation: 853 ft (260 m)

Population (2020)
  - Total: 6,656
  - Estimate (2021): 6,777
  - Density: 2,035/sq mi (785.9/km^{2})
- Time zone: UTC−6 (CST)
  - Summer (DST): UTC−5 (CDT)
- ZIP Code: 55352
- Area code: 952
- FIPS code: 27-32174
- GNIS feature ID: 2395483
- Website: jordanmn.gov

Jordan is a city in Scott County, Minnesota, United States. The population was 6,656 at the 2020 census.

== History ==
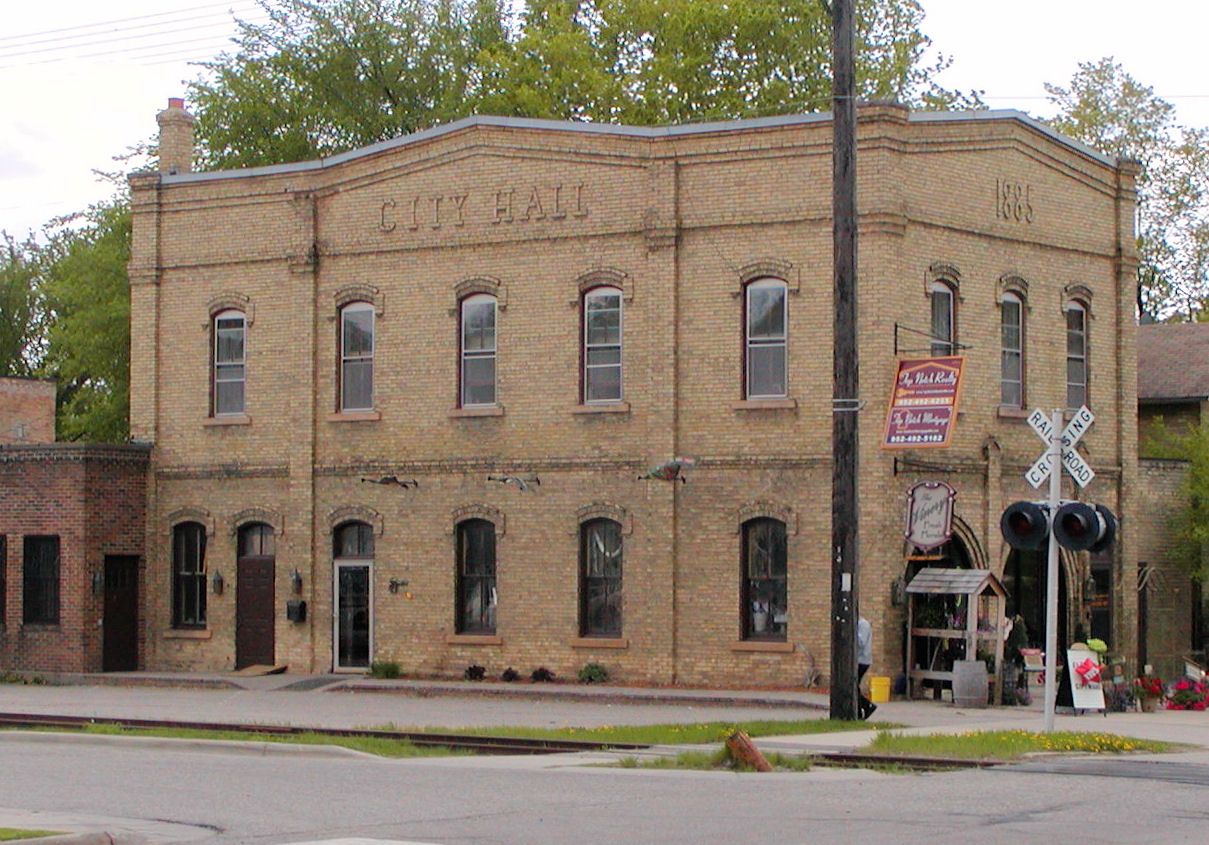
Old City Hall (2008)

The community began on November 27, 1853, when Thomas A. Holmes ordered the construction of a sawmill. This establishment gave Jordan its first name, Holmes Mill.

A year after the mill's founding, Thomas's brother William Holmes moved to the site and began platting a settlement. By 1855, he surveyed and recorded his settlement as Jordan City, after the Jordan River in Palestine. Jordan City accumulated some success in 1855 and 1856 with the addition of a post office and a handful of businesses.

In 1860, the neighboring settlement of Brentwood was surveyed by S. A. Hooper, J. H. Gardner and R. W. Thomas. The two settlements competed until a legislative action consolidated them into the village of Jordan in 1872. The consolidation only helped the settlement and by 1880 the population had boomed to 915 along with a boom in businesses in the village. A few of these businesses were breweries, which became especially successful until prohibition in 1919 temporarily caused their closure.

Jordan was incorporated as a city in 1891.

== Geography ==
According to the United States Census Bureau, the city has an area of 3.31 square miles (8.57 km^{2}); 3.29 square miles (8.52 km^{2}) is land and 0.02 square miles (0.05 km^{2}) is water.

U.S. Highway 169 and State Highways 21 and 282 are three of the main routes in the community.

The architects and civil engineers known for designing the layout of Jordan's streets also founded the neighboring town of Belle Plaine.

=== Climate ===
Climate data for Jordan, Minnesota (1991–2020 normals, extremes 1943–present)
Month	Jan	Feb	Mar	Apr	May	Jun	Jul	Aug	Sep	Oct	Nov	Dec	Year
Record high °F (°C)	59 (15)	65 (18)	82 (28)	93 (34)	99 (37)	102 (39)	105 (41)	101 (38)	95 (35)	90 (32)	77 (25)	67 (19)	105 (41)
Mean daily maximum °F (°C)	21.9 (−5.6)	26.5 (−3.1)	39.5 (4.2)	54.8 (12.7)	67.2 (19.6)	77.2 (25.1)	80.7 (27.1)	78.2 (25.7)	71.5 (21.9)	57.9 (14.4)	41.1 (5.1)	27.4 (−2.6)	53.7 (12.1)
Daily mean °F (°C)	13.6 (−10.2)	17.8 (−7.9)	30.4 (−0.9)	44.3 (6.8)	56.7 (13.7)	67.3 (19.6)	70.9 (21.6)	68.3 (20.2)	60.9 (16.1)	47.7 (8.7)	33.0 (0.6)	19.8 (−6.8)	44.2 (6.8)
Mean daily minimum °F (°C)	5.3 (−14.8)	9.2 (−12.7)	21.4 (−5.9)	33.9 (1.1)	46.2 (7.9)	57.4 (14.1)	61.1 (16.2)	58.4 (14.7)	50.3 (10.2)	37.5 (3.1)	25.0 (−3.9)	12.3 (−10.9)	34.8 (1.6)
Record low °F (°C)	−41 (−41)	−36 (−38)	−34 (−37)	3 (−16)	18 (−8)	30 (−1)	39 (4)	33 (1)	14 (−10)	3 (−16)	−20 (−29)	−41 (−41)	−41 (−41)
Average precipitation inches (mm)	0.81 (21)	0.89 (23)	1.76 (45)	2.81 (71)	4.47 (114)	5.06 (129)	3.76 (96)	5.19 (132)	3.20 (81)	2.66 (68)	1.55 (39)	1.16 (29)	33.32 (846)
Average snowfall inches (cm)	6.4 (16)	10.2 (26)	5.2 (13)	3.6 (9.1)	0.0 (0.0)	0.0 (0.0)	0.0 (0.0)	0.0 (0.0)	0.0 (0.0)	0.4 (1.0)	3.0 (7.6)	11.0 (28)	39.8 (101)
Average precipitation days (≥ 0.01 in)	4.7	3.8	5.9	8.2	10.6	10.3	9.9	8.6	7.8	7.2	5.2	5.4	87.6
Average snowy days (≥ 0.1 in)	4.0	3.0	1.7	0.9	0.0	0.0	0.0	0.0	0.0	0.1	1.3	3.5	14.5
Source: NOAA

== Demographics ==
Historical population
Census	Pop.	Note	%±
1880	915		—
1890	1,233		34.8%
1900	1,270		3.0%
1910	1,151		−9.4%
1920	1,106		−3.9%
1930	1,119		1.2%
1940	1,422		27.1%
1950	1,494		5.1%
1960	1,479		−1.0%
1970	1,836		24.1%
1980	2,663		45.0%
1990	2,909		9.2%
2000	3,833		31.8%
2010	5,470		42.7%
2020	6,656		21.7%
2021 (est.)	6,777		1.8%
U.S. Decennial Census; 2020 Census

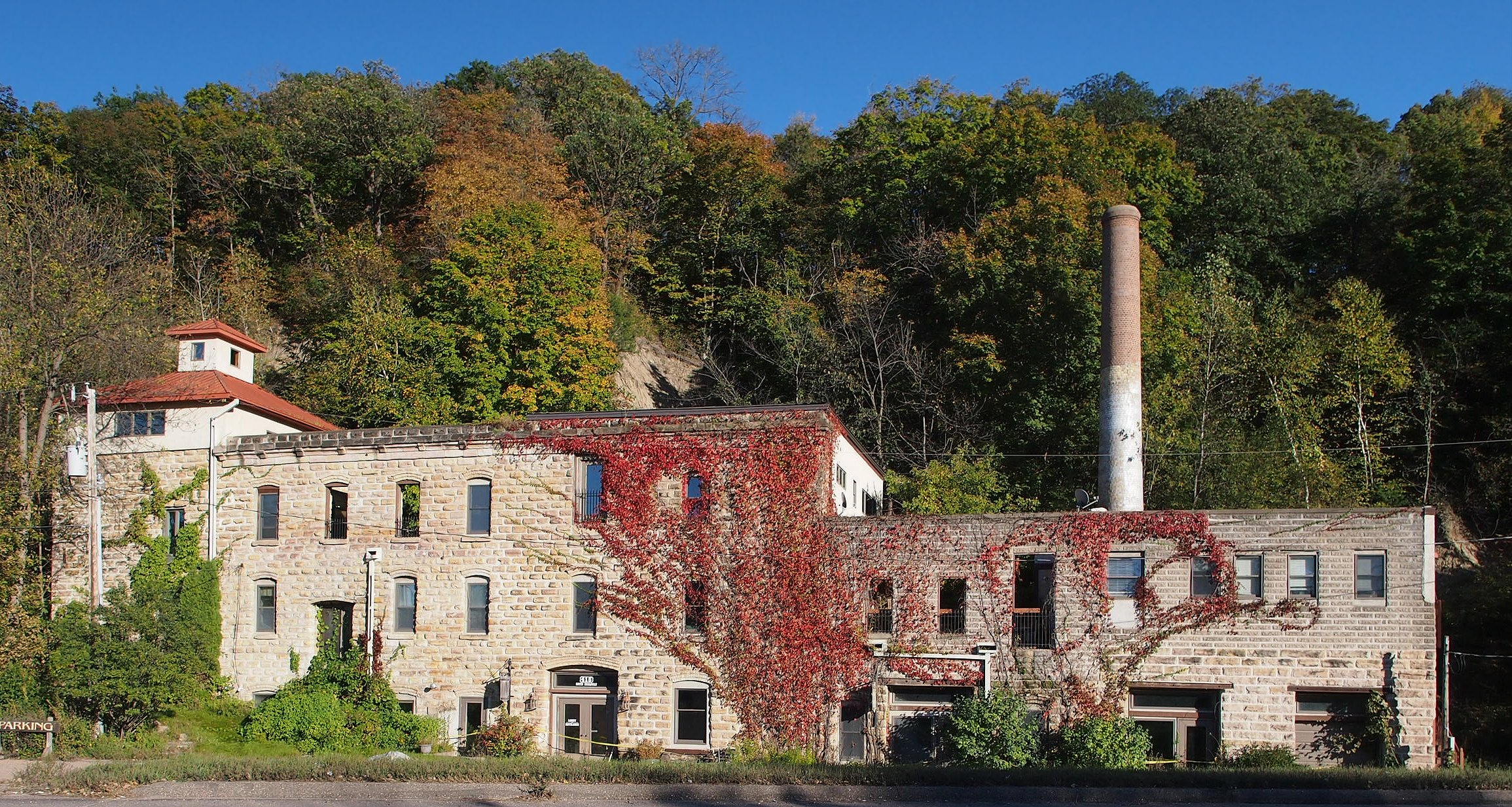
Jordan Brewery Ruins (2015)

=== 2020 census ===
As of the 2020 census, Jordan had a population of 6,656. The median age was 34.1 years. 31.9% of residents were under the age of 18 and 9.0% of residents were 65 years of age or older. For every 100 females there were 98.1 males, and for every 100 females age 18 and over there were 96.4 males age 18 and over.

99.8% of residents lived in urban areas, while 0.2% lived in rural areas.

There were 2,279 households in Jordan, of which 44.6% had children under the age of 18 living in them. Of all households, 56.3% were married-couple households, 14.4% were households with a male householder and no spouse or partner present, and 20.7% were households with a female householder and no spouse or partner present. About 20.7% of all households were made up of individuals and 8.7% had someone living alone who was 65 years of age or older.

There were 2,355 housing units, of which 3.2% were vacant. The homeowner vacancy rate was 0.9% and the rental vacancy rate was 4.0%.

Racial composition as of the 2020 census
Race	Number	Percent
White	5,541	83.2%
Black or African American	147	2.2%
American Indian and Alaska Native	63	0.9%
Asian	98	1.5%
Native Hawaiian and Other Pacific Islander	6	0.1%
Some other race	349	5.2%
Two or more races	452	6.8%
Hispanic or Latino (of any race)	651	9.8%

=== 2010 census ===
As of the census of 2010, there were 5,470 people, 1,871 households, and 1,428 families living in the city. The population density was 1,662.6 inhabitants per square mile (641.9/km^{2}). There were 1,961 housing units at an average density of 596.0 per square mile (230.1/km^{2}). The racial makeup of the city was 92.4% White, 0.6% African American, 0.8% Native American, 1.3% Asian, 2.4% from other races, and 2.4% from two or more races. Hispanic or Latino of any race were 6.5% of the population.

There were 1,871 households, of which 48.5% had children under the age of 18 living with them, 59.9% were married couples living together, 9.8% had a female householder with no husband present, 6.6% had a male householder with no wife present, and 23.7% were non-families. Of all households, 18.4% were made up of individuals, and 6.5% had someone living alone who was 65 years of age or older. The average household size was 2.92 and the average family size was 3.35.

The median age in the city was 31.8 years. 34% of residents were under the age of 18; 6.1% were between the ages of 18 and 24; 32.9% were from 25 to 44; 20.8% were from 45 to 64; and 6.1% were 65 years of age or older. The gender makeup of the city was 50.0% male and 50.0% female.

=== 2000 census ===
As of the census of 2000, there were 3,833 people, 1,349 households, and 980 families living in the city. The population density was 1,466.5 inhabitants per square mile (566.2/km^{2}). There were 1,423 housing units at an average density of 544.4 per square mile (210.2/km^{2}). The racial makeup of the city was 94.08% White, 0.50% African American, 0.60% Native American, 0.18% Asian, 3.10% from other races, and 1.54% from two or more races. Hispanic or Latino of any race were 6.60% of the population.

== Recreation ==
Jordan has a tradition of baseball. It is home to the Jordan Brewers amateur baseball team, state champions in 1986, 1994, 2004, and 2019. Brewer Tournament MVPs include Ron Beckman (1986), John Dolan (1994), Trent Bohnsack (2004), and Joe Lucas (2019).

Jordan is also home to the Post #3 Jordan Legion Baseball Team, which won the State Tournament four straight years from 2005 to 2008. It took 2nd place in 2010 and 3rd place in 2004 and 2009. It won the National/Regional Tournament three straight years from 2005 to 2007 and was runner-up in 2008.

Jordan High School athletic teams have different mascots for men (Hubmen), women (Jaguars) and cooperative sports (Panthers) with neighboring Belle Plaine. Jordan's High School football team won the Minnesota State championship in 1983.

Jordan is also home to Minnesota's Largest Candy Store.

=== Places of Worship ===
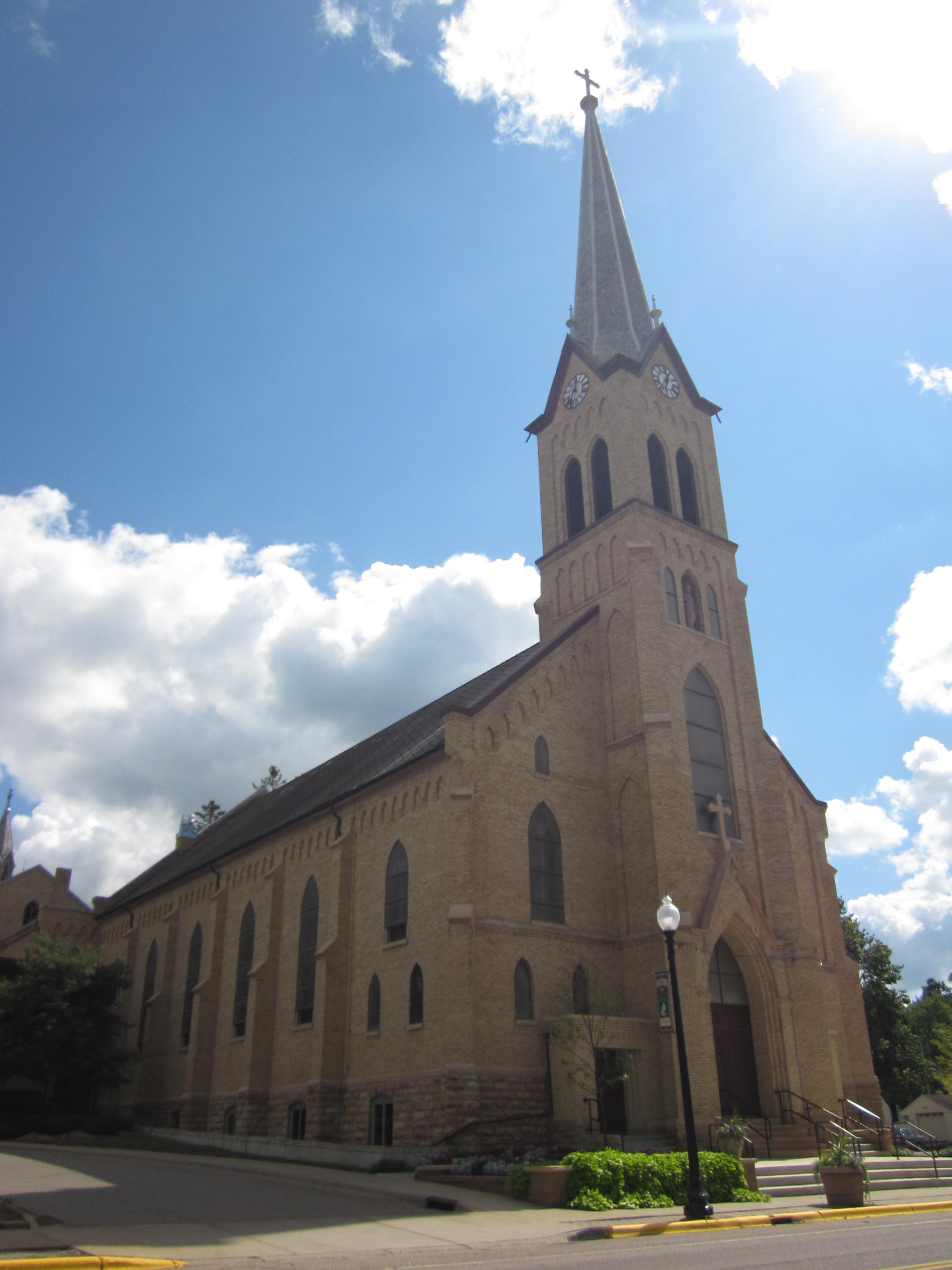
St John the Baptist Catholic Church

St. John the Baptist Catholic Church was formed in 1858 from an influx of Catholics unsatisfied with the distance between a nearby church built that year and Holmes' Mill. The first church building was built on a plot donated by Thomas Holmes (see History). In 1889, the church building was rebuilt at its current location.

Sand Creek Baptist Church was established in 2006 as a church plant of the Prior Lake Baptist Church. They adopted the former Immanual United Methodist Church building in 2017, its current residence.

Hope Lutheran Church was founded in 1973 under the Evangelical Lutheran Church in America from a congregation of locals.

St. Paul Evangelical Lutheran Church was founded in 1867 under the Wisconsin Evangelical Lutheran Synod from a congregation of locals.

=== City parks ===
- Brentwood Park
- Pekarna Park
- Lions Park
- Log Cabin
- Lagoon Park
- Timberline Park
- Holzer Park
- Jordan Skateboard Park (designed by Jared Hunt and John Beckius)
- Mini-Met Ball Park (directly adjacent to the Skateboard Park)

=== State parks and reserves ===
- Metropolitan Regional Park System
- Minnesota Valley National Wildlife Refuge
- Minnesota Valley State Recreation Area

== Sexual abuse scandal ==
In 1985, several adults in Scott County were accused of sexually abusing children, although only one, James Rud, was convicted. The case was the subject of the song titled "Jordan, Minnesota", by Chicago-based noise rock band Big Black, which appears on the 1986 album Atomizer.

== Explanatory notes ==
1.See Report on Scott County Investigations, Hubert H. Humphrey III, Attorney General (Feb. 12, 1985).
