= New Prague, Minnesota =

City in Minnesota, United States

- City
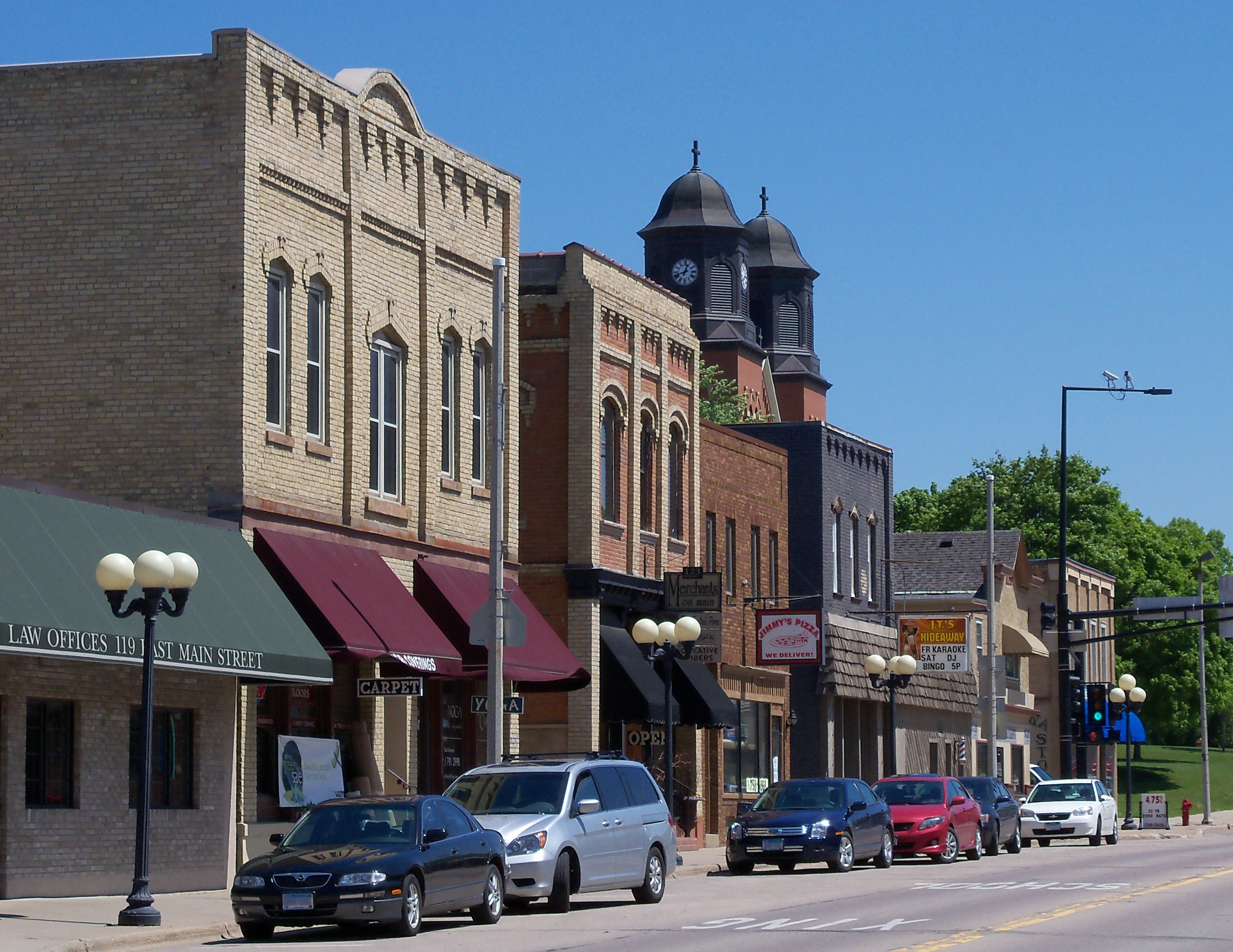
- Buildings in downtown New Prague
- Motto: "A Tradition Of Progress"
- Location of the city of New Prague within Scott and Le Sueur Counties in the state of Minnesota
- Coordinates: 44°32′45″N 93°34′32″W
- Country: United States
- State: Minnesota
- Counties: Scott, Le Sueur

Government
  - Mayor: Sophia Bruder

Area
  - Total: 3.87 sq mi (10.02 km^{2})
  - Land: 3.87 sq mi (10.02 km^{2})
  - Water: 0 sq mi (0.00 km^{2})
- Elevation: 1,001 ft (305 m)

Population (2020)
  - Total: 8,162
  - Density: 2,108.9/sq mi (814.24/km^{2})
- Time zone: UTC-6 (Central (CST))
  - Summer (DST): UTC-5 (CDT)
- ZIP code: 56071
- Area code: 952
- FIPS code: 27-45808
- GNIS feature ID: 2395211
- Website: newpraguemn.gov

New Prague (/ˈpreɪɡ/ PRAYG) is a city in Scott and Le Sueur counties in the state of Minnesota. The population was 8,162 at the 2020 census. Although the northern portion of the city is located within the Metropolitan Council geographic area, the City of New Prague, through special legislation (M.S. 473.121, Subd. 2), is outside the Metropolitan Council review area/approval jurisdiction.

== History ==
=== Origin ===
New Prague was laid out in 1856, and named after Prague, the capital of Bohemia (now the Czech Republic). The immigrants from Bohemia built the town of New Prague, and many of them identified as Czechs.

At the advice of Catholic Bishop Rev. Joseph Cretin, Anton Philipp, a native German, first settled within the present limits of New Prague. In 1856 Philipp purchased 160 acres in Helena Township, Scott County. Philipp did not make an official plat of the town but began selling lots that same year, marking the beginning of New Prague. Several Bohemian families came to the area shortly after Philipp arrived.

=== Late 19th century ===
New Prague's early development was not spectacular for a variety of reasons. First, during the Civil War years, 1861–1865, European immigration almost stopped as European immigrants were naturally wary of the American Civil War. Second, located in the middle of the Big Woods, the enormous challenge of clearing fields proceeded at a slow pace.

The town was known as Praha from 1872 to 1879. On March 1, 1877, state of Minnesota approved the incorporation of Praha as a village. In 1879 the name was changed to Prague.

One of the most important developments in the new village occurred in 1877 when the Minneapolis & St. Louis Railway (M & St. L) reached New Prague. The arrival of the railroad era expedited agriculture as New Prague's most important industry. A link with the outside world enabled farmers to send their commodities to markets and created a conduit to bring inventory to the village's businesses. Just four years after the M & St. L reached New Prague, the first grain elevator and flour mill were completed, marking the beginning of New Prague earning its nickname, the “Flour City.”

Czech immigration to the United States reached its peak during the 1880s with 62,000 coming to the United States during this decade. Along with Montgomery, which is approximately eight miles south of New Prague, New Prague was becoming the center of “The Bohemian Triangle” of Minnesota covering parts of Scott, Le Sueur and Rice counties, which are neighboring counties. Through the decades since 1856, Le Sueur County has had more Bohemians than any other county in the state.

Construction was booming in the 1880s. The town's first bank opened in 1883, the Czech-Slovak Protective Society (C. S. P. S.) Opera Hall was built, the New Prague Foundry started business, the second public school was built, and two hotels were constructed.

The village's name was changed from Prague to New Prague on February 25, 1884.

The 1890s were New Prague's heyday decade. The town was becoming a major market for farm produce and was providing goods and services for growing numbers of farmers and villagers for miles around. Streets were being graded and wooden sidewalks built along the streets. New Prague was incorporated as a city on April 4, 1891. New Prague Flouring Milling Company completed its mill in 1895. Electric lights were installed in the city in 1895, and telephone lines were installed in 1898.

Similar to the rest of the state, the 1880s and 1890s were two decades with the greatest growth in population. New Prague's population more than tripled during that 20-year period going from 384 residents to 1228, while the state's population more than doubled during that same period.

Original businesses outgrew their original log and wood-frame storefronts. A large commercial district filled with solid brick, stone, and wood-frame commercial structures developed along Main Street.

New Prague had one of the largest earthquakes in Minnesota history. On December 11, 1860, there was a 4.7 magnitude earthquake with a Mercalli intensity of VI.

== Geography ==
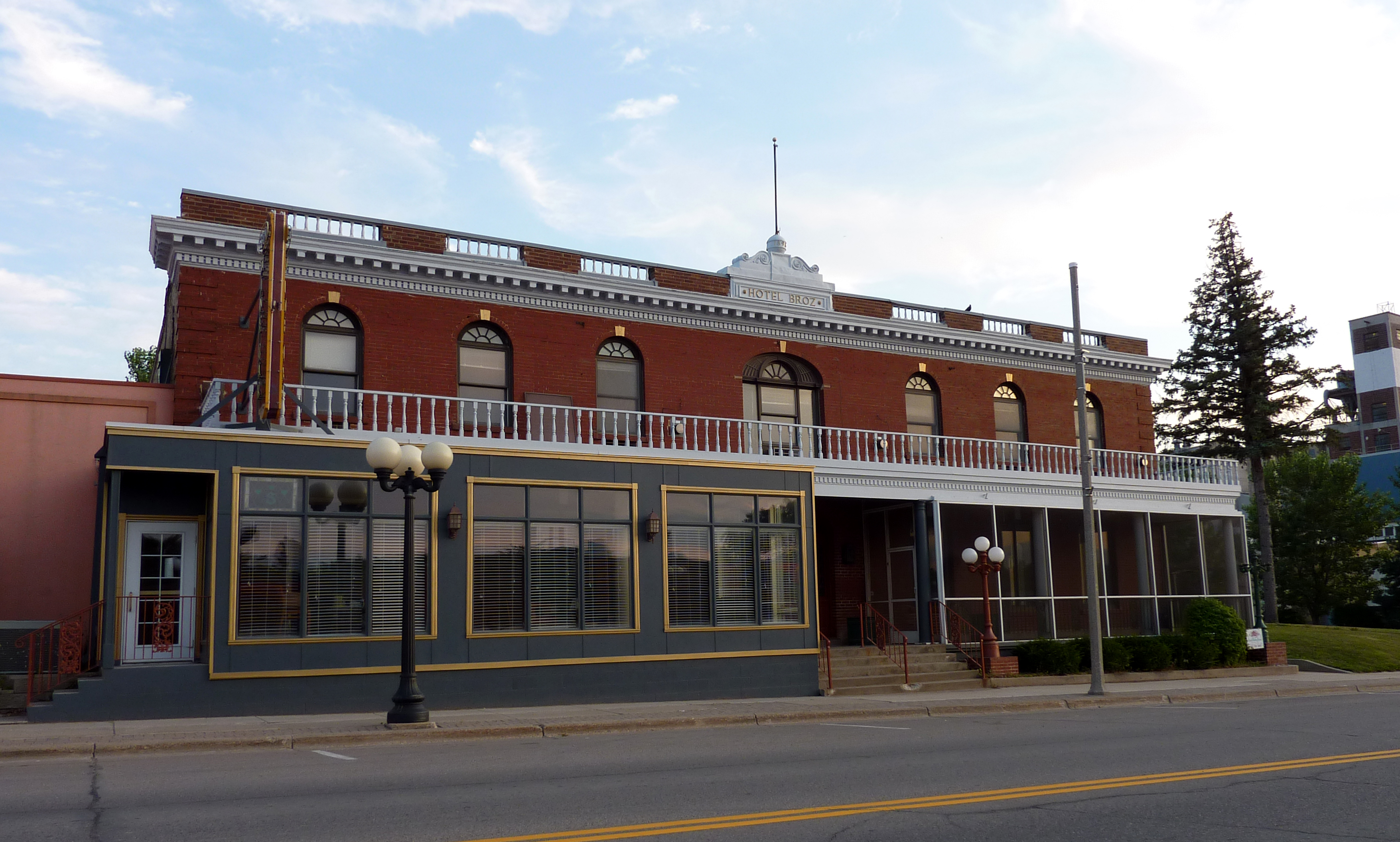
The Hotel Broz is listed on the NRHP.

According to the United States Census Bureau, the city has a total area of 3.81 square miles (9.87 km^{2}), all land. The land around the area varies from flat to hilly.

The city of New Prague is located in two counties, Scott and Le Sueur. North of Main Street (Highway 13/19) is Scott County; and on the south side is Le Sueur County.

Minnesota State Highways 13, 19, and 21 are three of the main routes in New Prague.

There is one lake in the New Prague area, Cedar Lake (Scott County). The lake is a popular destination for fishing, ice fishing, water skiing, and jet skiing. A snowmobile trail runs through the lake during the winter season. An aerated area is located in the eastern part of the lake. The lake is 779.5 acres (3.155 km^{2}), has a maximum depth of 13 feet (4.0 m) and has a 3.1-foot (0.94 m) water clarity. There are numerous developments in the area, including a new development located on County Road 89 on the west side of the lake (which is located outside of the New Prague City Limits).

=== Climate ===
The climate of New Prague is classified as warm-summer humid continental with features of a hot-summer humid continental (Köppen Dfa).

Climate data for New Prague
Month	Jan	Feb	Mar	Apr	May	Jun	Jul	Aug	Sep	Oct	Nov	Dec	Year
Mean daily maximum °C (°F)	−6.3 (20.7)	−2.8 (27.0)	4 (39)	13.4 (56.1)	20.8 (69.4)	26 (79)	28.2 (82.8)	26.6 (79.9)	21.4 (70.5)	15.3 (59.5)	4.8 (40.6)	−3.7 (25.3)	12.3 (54.1)
Daily mean °C (°F)	−12.2 (10.0)	−8.8 (16.2)	−1.5 (29.3)	7.1 (44.8)	14.1 (57.4)	19.4 (66.9)	21.7 (71.1)	20.2 (68.4)	14.9 (58.8)	8.8 (47.8)	−0.3 (31.5)	−8.8 (16.2)	6.2 (43.2)
Mean daily minimum °C (°F)	−18.0 (−0.4)	−14.8 (5.4)	−7 (19)	0.9 (33.6)	7.5 (45.5)	12.9 (55.2)	15.3 (59.5)	13.8 (56.8)	8.5 (47.3)	2.4 (36.3)	−5.3 (22.5)	−15.8 (3.6)	−9.6 (14.7)
Average rainfall mm (inches)	20 (0.8)	18 (0.7)	45 (1.8)	64 (2.5)	89 (3.5)	105 (4.1)	105 (4.1)	102 (4.0)	80 (3.1)	56 (2.2)	37 (1.5)	24 (0.9)	745 (29.3)
Average snowfall cm (inches)	24 (9.6)	21 (8.1)	22 (8.5)	7.4 (2.9)	0 (0)	0 (0)	0 (0)	0 (0)	0 (0)	0.51 (0.2)	15 (6.1)	27 (10.7)	117 (46.2)
Average rainy days	4.8	4.7	6.7	8.5	11	10.9	8.9	9.2	8.4	8.1	6	6.1	93.4
Average snowy days	6.8	5	4.2	1.4	0	0	0	0	0	0.3	3.2	6.7	27.6
Average relative humidity (%)	55.3	82	90.9	78.3	78.9	91.8	82.4	78.5	74.1	87.7	80.8	68.4	79.1
Source: climate-data.org, bestplaces.net, and usa.com

== Demographics ==
Historical population
Census	Pop.	Note	%±
1880	384		—
1890	955		148.7%
1900	1,228		28.6%
1910	1,554		26.5%
1920	1,540		−0.9%
1930	1,548		0.5%
1940	1,645		6.3%
1950	1,915		16.4%
1960	2,533		32.3%
1970	2,680		5.8%
1980	2,952		10.1%
1990	3,569		20.9%
2000	4,559		27.7%
2010	7,321		60.6%
2020	8,162		11.5%
U.S. Decennial Census; 2018 Estimate

=== 2020 census ===
As of the 2020 census, New Prague had a population of 8,162. The median age was 36.8 years. 27.9% of residents were under the age of 18 and 15.2% of residents were 65 years of age or older. For every 100 females there were 96.2 males, and for every 100 females age 18 and over there were 92.3 males age 18 and over.

99.3% of residents lived in urban areas, while 0.7% lived in rural areas.

There were 3,027 households in New Prague, of which 37.1% had children under the age of 18 living in them. Of all households, 55.3% were married-couple households, 14.4% were households with a male householder and no spouse or partner present, and 23.0% were households with a female householder and no spouse or partner present. About 24.5% of all households were made up of individuals and 12.7% had someone living alone who was 65 years of age or older.

There were 3,191 housing units, of which 5.1% were vacant. The homeowner vacancy rate was 0.5% and the rental vacancy rate was 11.2%.

Racial composition as of the 2020 census
Race	Number	Percent
White	7,576	92.8%
Black or African American	56	0.7%
American Indian and Alaska Native	46	0.6%
Asian	84	1.0%
Native Hawaiian and Other Pacific Islander	2	0.0%
Some other race	78	1.0%
Two or more races	320	3.9%
Hispanic or Latino (of any race)	226	2.8%

=== 2010 census ===
As of the census of 2010, there were 7,321 people, 2,711 households, and 1,910 families residing in the city. The population density was 1,921.5 inhabitants per square mile (741.9/km^{2}). There were 2,862 housing units at an average density of 751.2 units per square mile (290.0 units/km^{2}). The racial makeup of the city was 96.5% White, 0.5% African American, 0.3% Native American, 0.6% Asian, 0.6% from other races, and 1.5% from two or more races. Hispanic or Latino of any race were 1.9% of the population.

There were 2,711 households, of which 42.5% had children under the age of 18 living with them, 55.7% were married couples living together, 9.7% had a female householder with no husband present, 5.0% had a male householder with no wife present, and 29.5% were non-families. 24.6% of all households were made up of individuals, and 11.7% had someone living alone who was 65 years of age or older. The average household size was 2.67 and the average family size was 3.22.

The median age in the city was 32.7 years. 31.5% of residents were under the age of 18; 6.6% were between the ages of 18 and 24; 29.1% were from 25 to 44; 20.4% were from 45 to 64; and 12.4% were 65 years of age or older. The gender makeup of the city was 48.1% male and 51.9% female.

=== 2000 census ===
According to the 2000 census, 38.1% were of German, 20.9% Czech, 8.8% Norwegian, 8.0% Irish and 5.4% Czech/Slovak ancestry. Also, 99.6% spoke English, 0.3% Czech and 0.1% German as their first language.

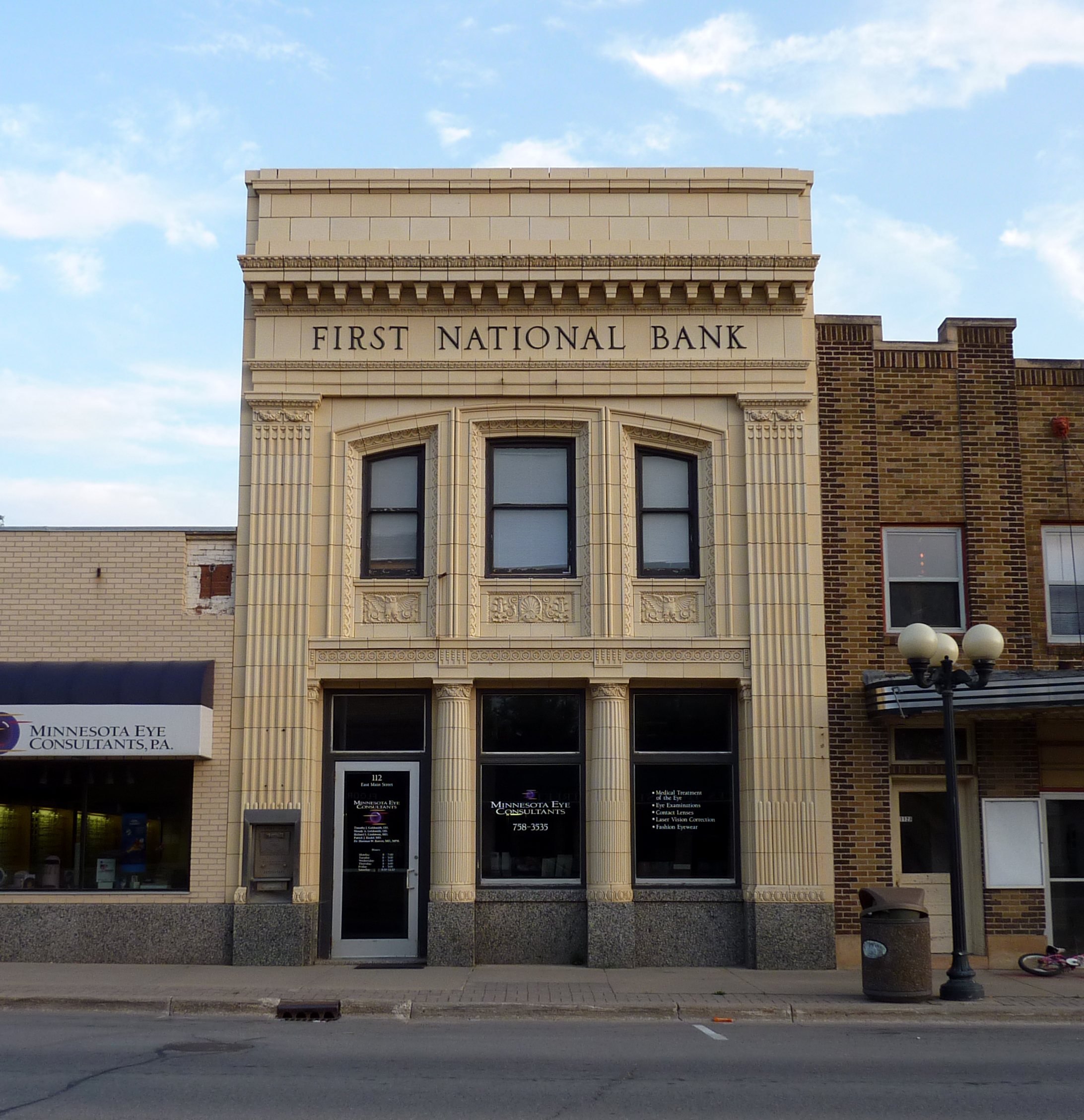
The First National Bank building (1922) has an intricate glazed terra cotta exterior and is listed on the NRHP.

The following Demographic Data is a result of the 2000 Census: There were 1,694 households, out of which 39.0% had children under the age of 18 living with them, 56.7% were married couples living together, 10.0% had a female householder with no husband present, and 30.3% were non-families. 25.4% of all households were made up of individuals, and 13.8% had someone living alone who was 65 years of age or older. The average household size was 2.63 and the average family size was 3.20.

In the city, the population was spread out, with 30.6% under the age of 18, 7.1% from 18 to 24, 28.7% from 25 to 44, 17.1% from 45 to 64, and 16.6% who were 65 years of age or older. The median age was 34 years. For every 100 females, there were 91.7 males. For every 100 females age 18 and over, there were 86.4 males.

The median income for a household in the city was $41,750, and the median income for a family was $50,341. Males had a median income of $37,393 versus $25,164 for females. The per capita income for the city was $17,732. About 2.6% of families and 6.5% of the population were below the poverty line, including 4.9% of those under age 18 and 13.7% of those age 65 or over.

== Schools ==
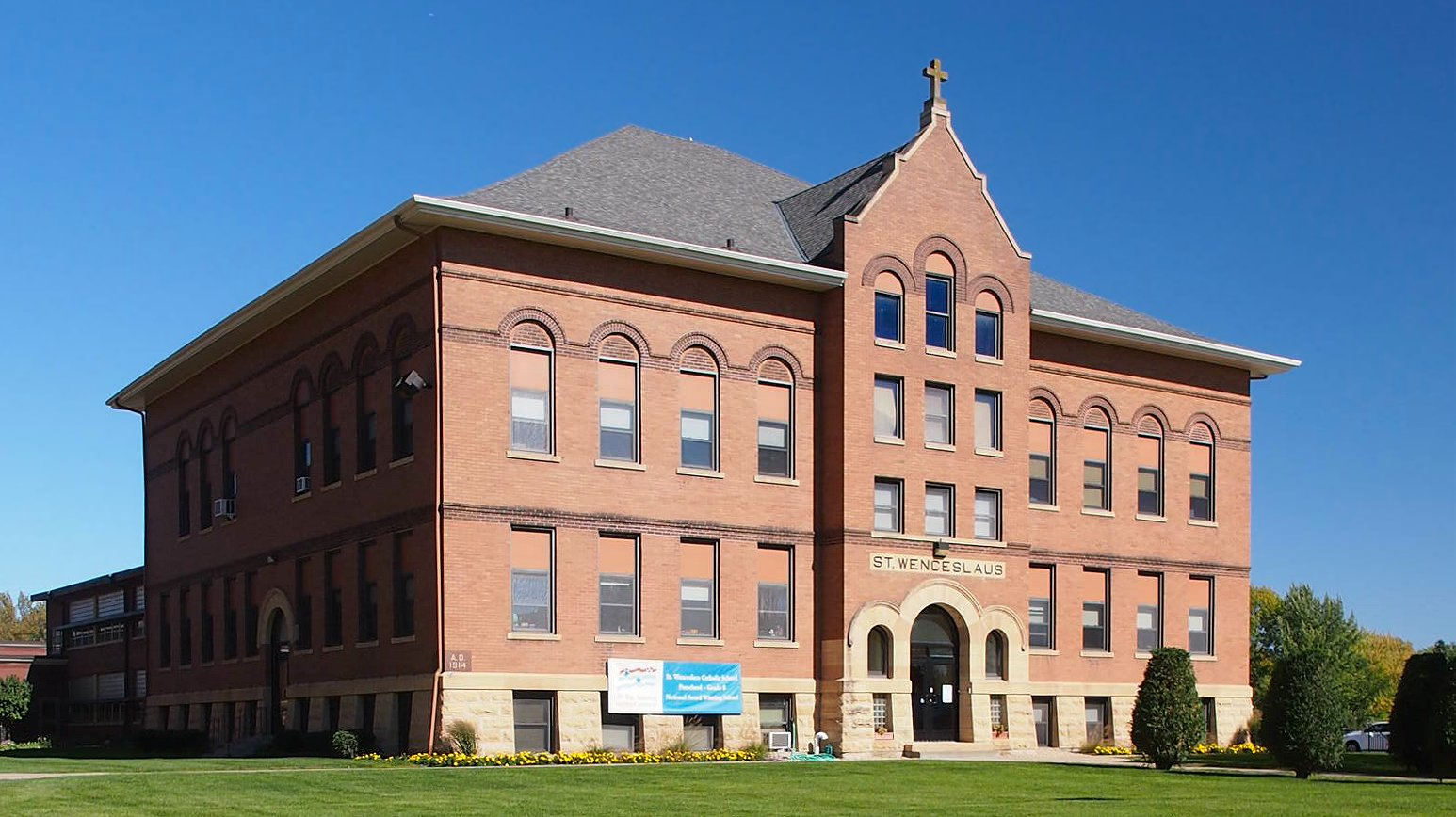
St. Wenceslaus Catholic School

There are five schools in the New Prague Area Schools (District 721): New Prague High School (9–12), New Prague Middle School (6–8), Falcon Ridge Elementary in New Prague (K–5), Raven Stream Elementary in New Prague (K–5), and Eagle View Elementary in nearby Elko New Market (K–5). The total enrollment in the district for the 2005–2006 school year was 3,205 students. New Prague High School's nickname is the Trojans. The Trojans are members of the Wright County Conference, previously members of the Missota Conference prior to the 2014 season. The sports the Trojans participate in include baseball, softball, boys' and girls' basketball, boys' and girls' cross country, boys' and girls' hockey, boys' and girls' tennis, track, swimming, football, cheerleading, wrestling, golf, volleyball, adapted floor hockey, and adapted softball. New in the fall of 2007 is boys' and girls' soccer, and new in the winter of 2009–2010 is the New Prague Trojan Dance Team. New Prague Middle School has been ranked in the top 3 results in MN state standards test (MCA).

There is also a private K–8 school located in New Prague known as St. Wenceslaus Catholic School. Their athletic symbol is the Saints. They offer multiple sports for grade 4–8. The emphasis at St. Wenceslaus Catholic School is Christian Values and Academic Excellence.

Holy Cross Catholic Schools serves part of the New Prague District, representing three Catholic Parishes in Lonsdale, Elko New Market and Veseli. The school opened a new building near Webster in 2005.

== Arts and culture ==
Dožínky is a Czech Harvest Festival patterned after the "Old Country" original. The Dožínky Festival in the Czech Republic is celebrated annually to give thanks for the bountiful harvest.

== Media ==
=== Radio ===
- KCHK (1350 AM; 95.5 FM)

== Religion ==
- Pillar of Grace Church (New Prague, Minnesota) (Christian & Missionary Alliance)
- Church of St. Wenceslaus (Roman Catholic)
- Spirit of Life Church (New Prague, Minnesota) (Assemblies of God)
