= Early Shakopee Houses =

Historic houses in Minnesota, United States

- U.S. National Register of Historic Places
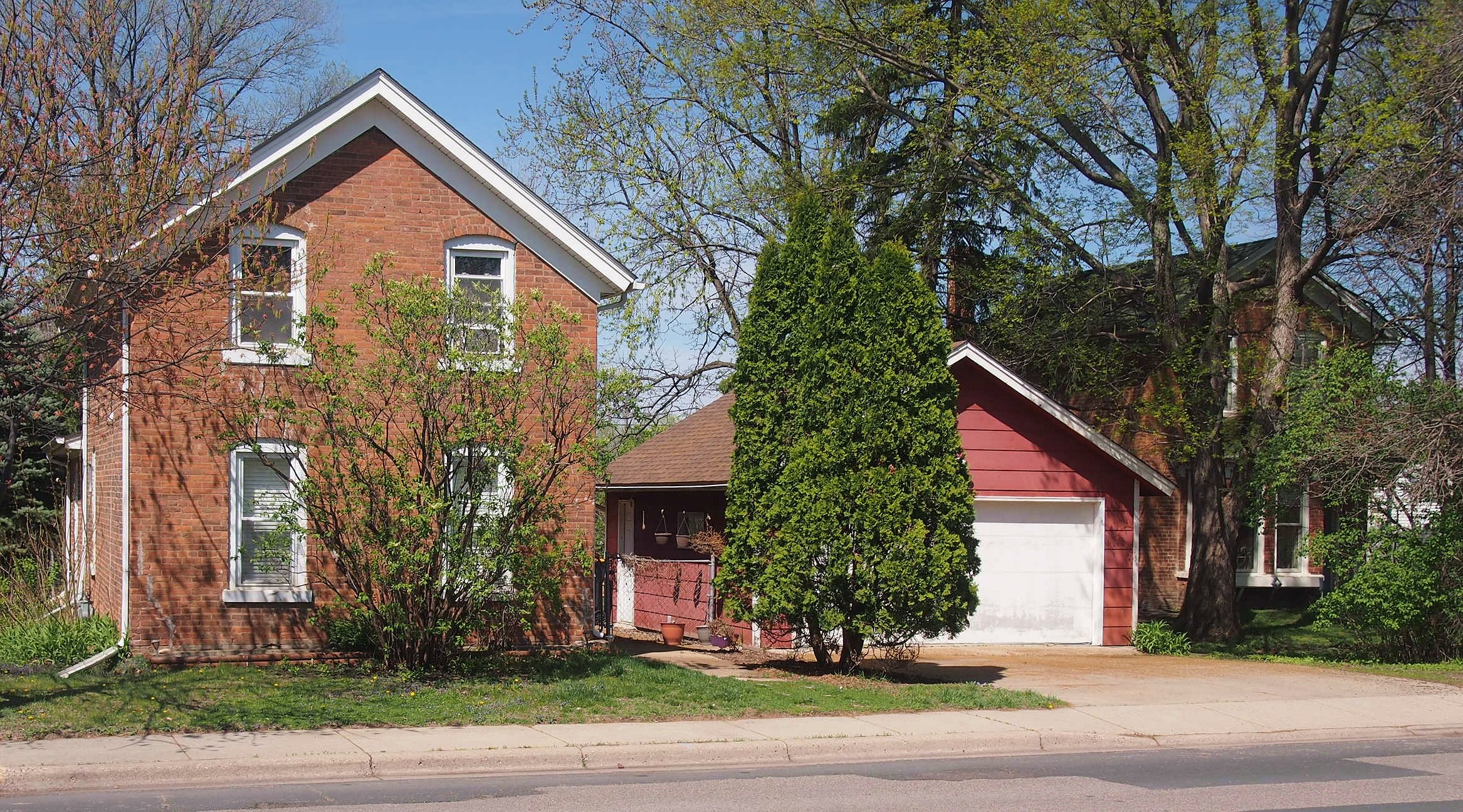
- The Early Shakopee Houses from the south, with a modern garage between

- Location within Minnesota Location within the United States
- Location: 411 and 419 E. 2nd Avenue, Shakopee, Minnesota
- Coordinates: 44°47′54″N 93°31′18″W
- Area: Less than 1 acre (0.40 ha)
- Built: c. 1865
- MPS: Scott County MRA
- NRHP reference No.: 80002169
- Added to NRHP: April 17, 1980

The Early Shakopee Houses are a pair of houses at 411 and 419 East 2nd Avenue in Shakopee, Minnesota, United States. They were built around 1865 using the vernacular architecture, modest dimensions, and red brick common to Shakopee's early homes. The houses were listed together on the National Register of Historic Places in 1980 for their significance in the themes of architecture and exploration/settlement. They were nominated for being the city's most representative surviving examples of its characteristic early residential stock.

== History ==
The houses are built mainly of brick, which was quite common in Scott County, even for modest residential dwellings. These two houses, as with other structures in Scott County, were designed by local builders, not by well-known architects, but they show the influence of major architectural styles as interpreted by area residents and builders. The houses date back to about 1865, when the county was experiencing a phase of growth associated with the construction of railroads. The Minnesota Valley Railroad, later part of the Chicago, St. Paul, Minneapolis and Omaha Railway, built its line through Shakopee in 1865. Shakopee had been established as a river town in 1854, but the growth of railroad lines in the county accelerated Shakopee's growth. The Merchants Hotel and these two houses in Shakopee, along with the Hooper–Bowler–Hillstrom House and the Episcopal Church of the Transfiguration in Belle Plaine and several buildings in the Jordan Historic District in Jordan, were nominated to the National Register as examples of the development in the railroad boom era in Scott County.

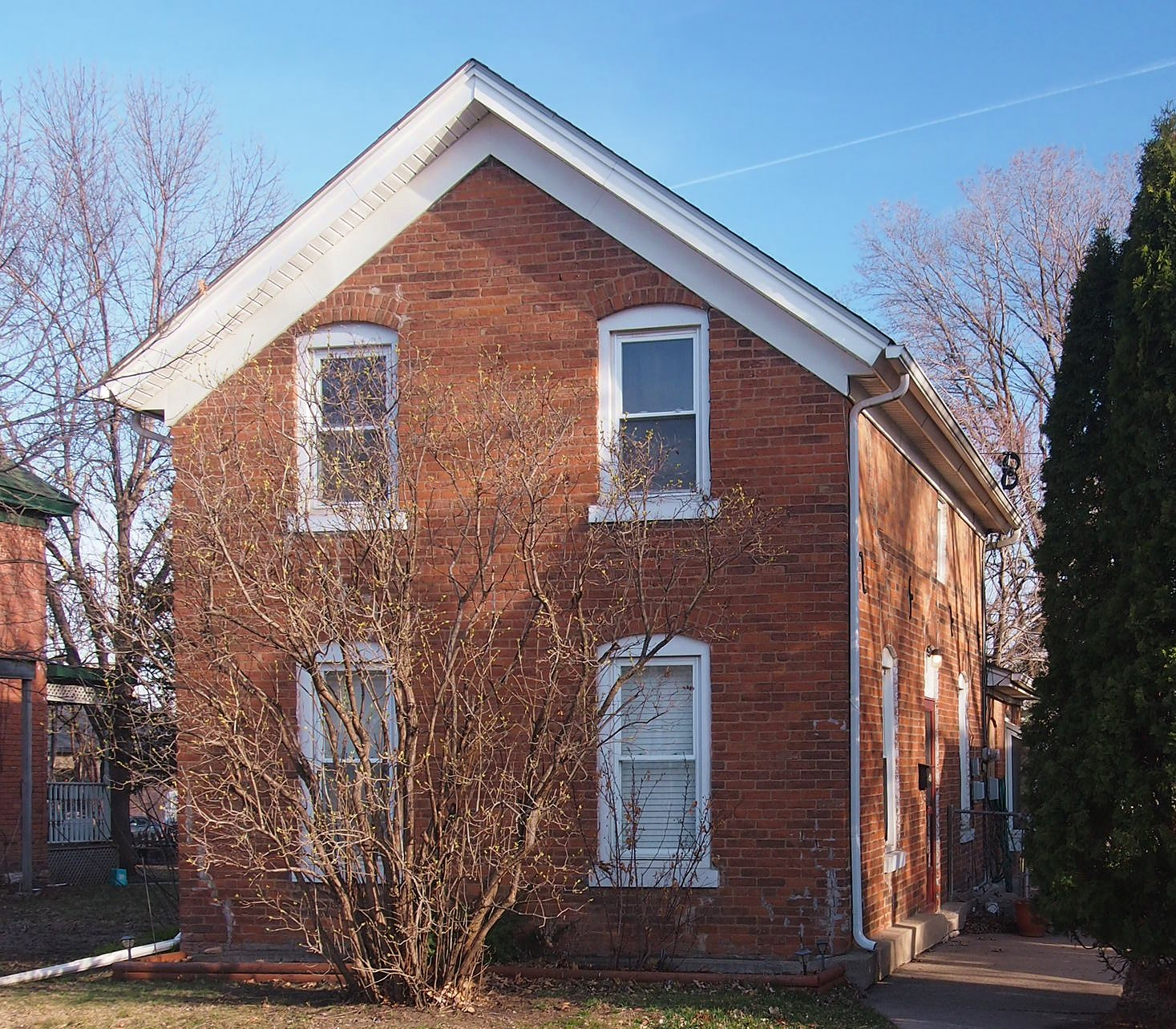
411 East 2nd Avenue

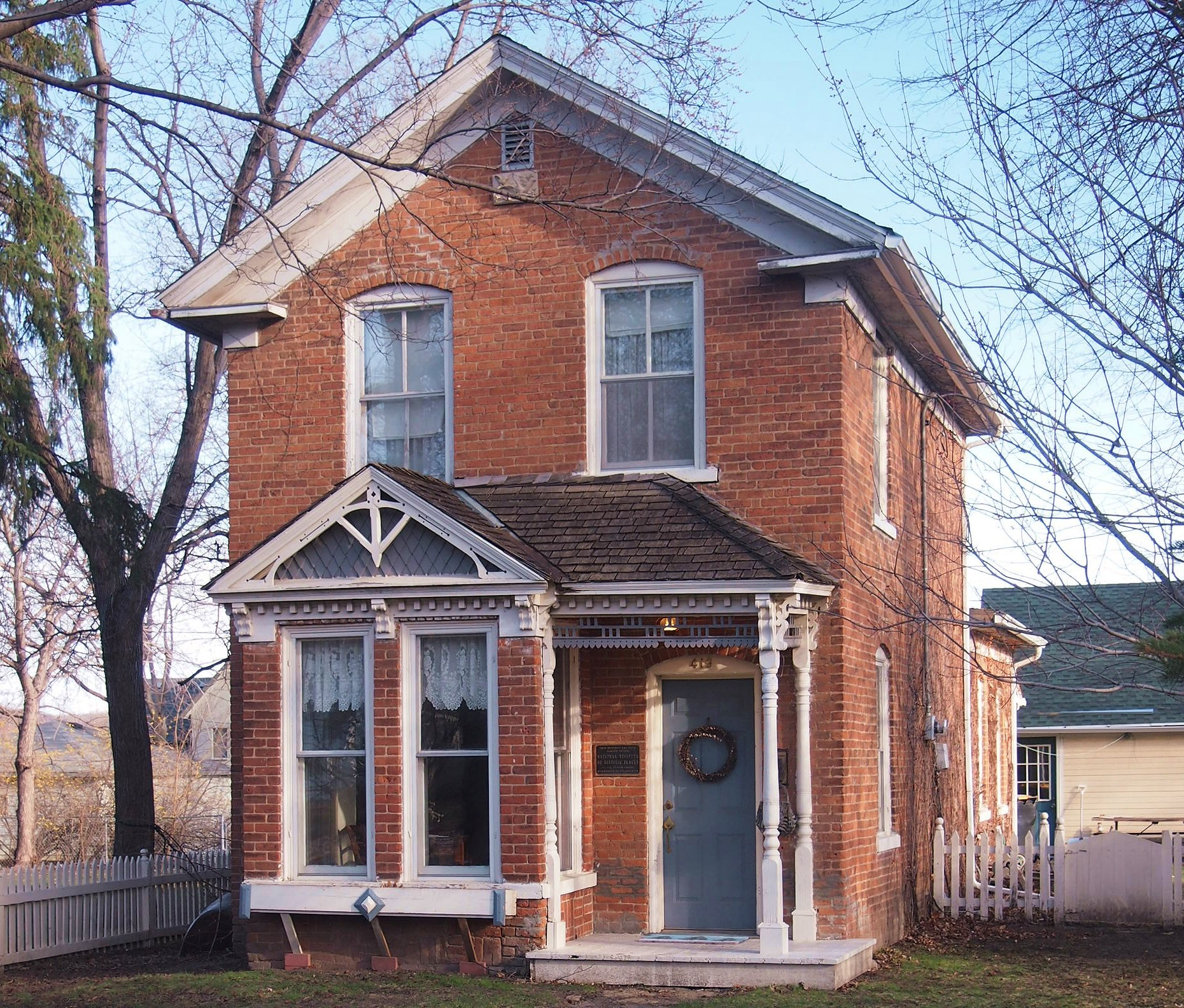
419 East 2nd Avenue

== See also ==
- National Register of Historic Places listings in Scott County, Minnesota
