= Wencl Kajer Farmstead =

Historic farmstead in Minnesota, United States

- U.S. National Register of Historic Places
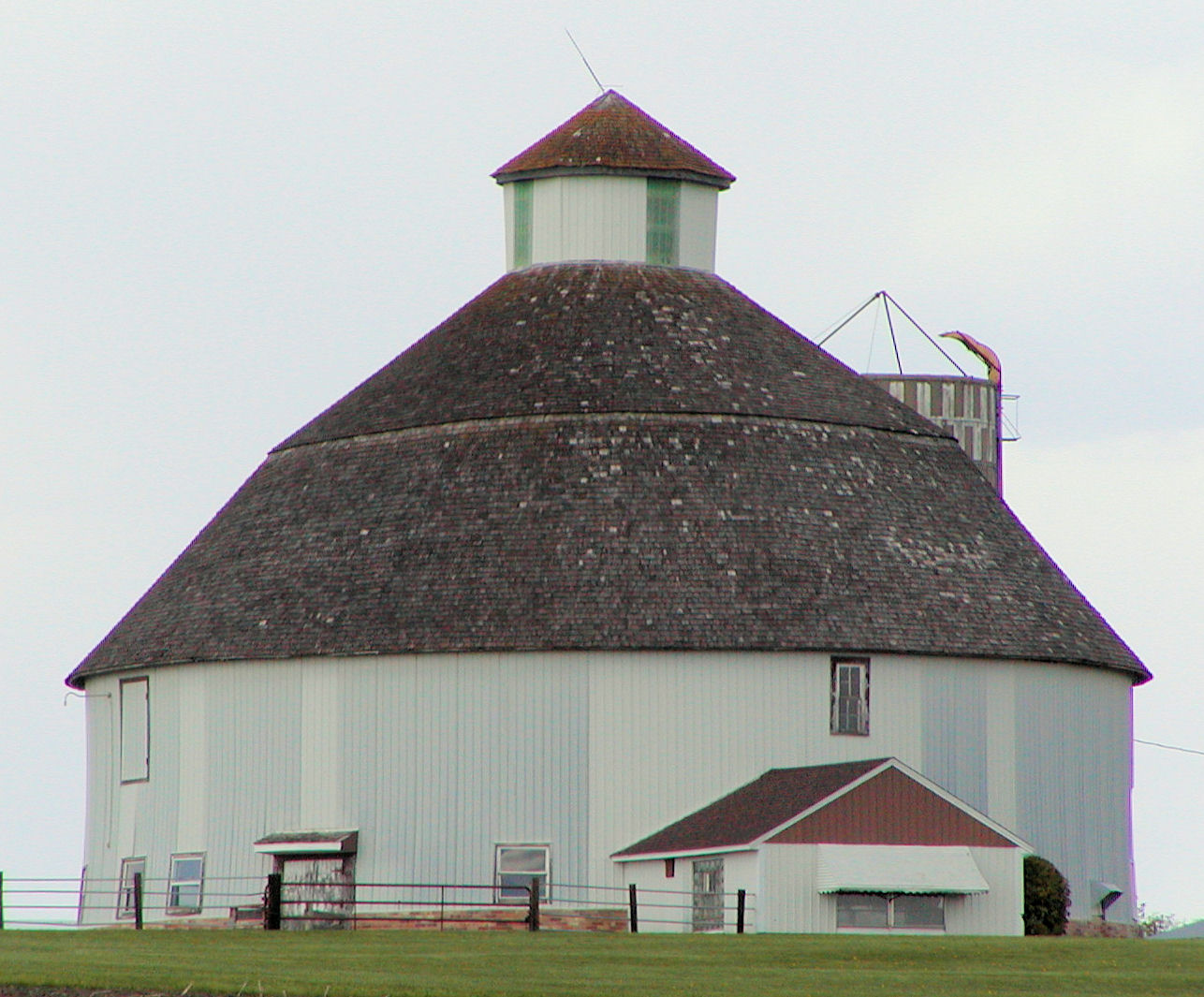
- The round barn on the Wencl Kajer Farmstead

- Location within Minnesota Location within the United States
- Location: 6406 County Highway 2, New Market Township, Minnesota
- Nearest city: Elko New Market, Minnesota
- Coordinates: 44°34′30″N 93°23′32″W
- Area: 4 acres (1.6 ha)
- Built: 1918–1920
- MPS: Scott County MRA
- NRHP reference No.: 80002166
- Added to NRHP: April 17, 1980

The Wencl Kajer Farmstead is a former dairy farm in New Market Township, Minnesota, United States. Situated on a hill with a distinctive round barn built in 1918, the farm was a prominent local landmark. The barn was removed from the property sometime between 2008 and 2017. The principal remaining historic building is the 1920 brick farmhouse. The farmstead was listed on the National Register of Historic Places in 1980 for its significance in the themes of agriculture and architecture. It was nominated for being a highly visible representative of dairy farming, the predominant form of agriculture in 20th-century Scott County, Minnesota.

== Description ==
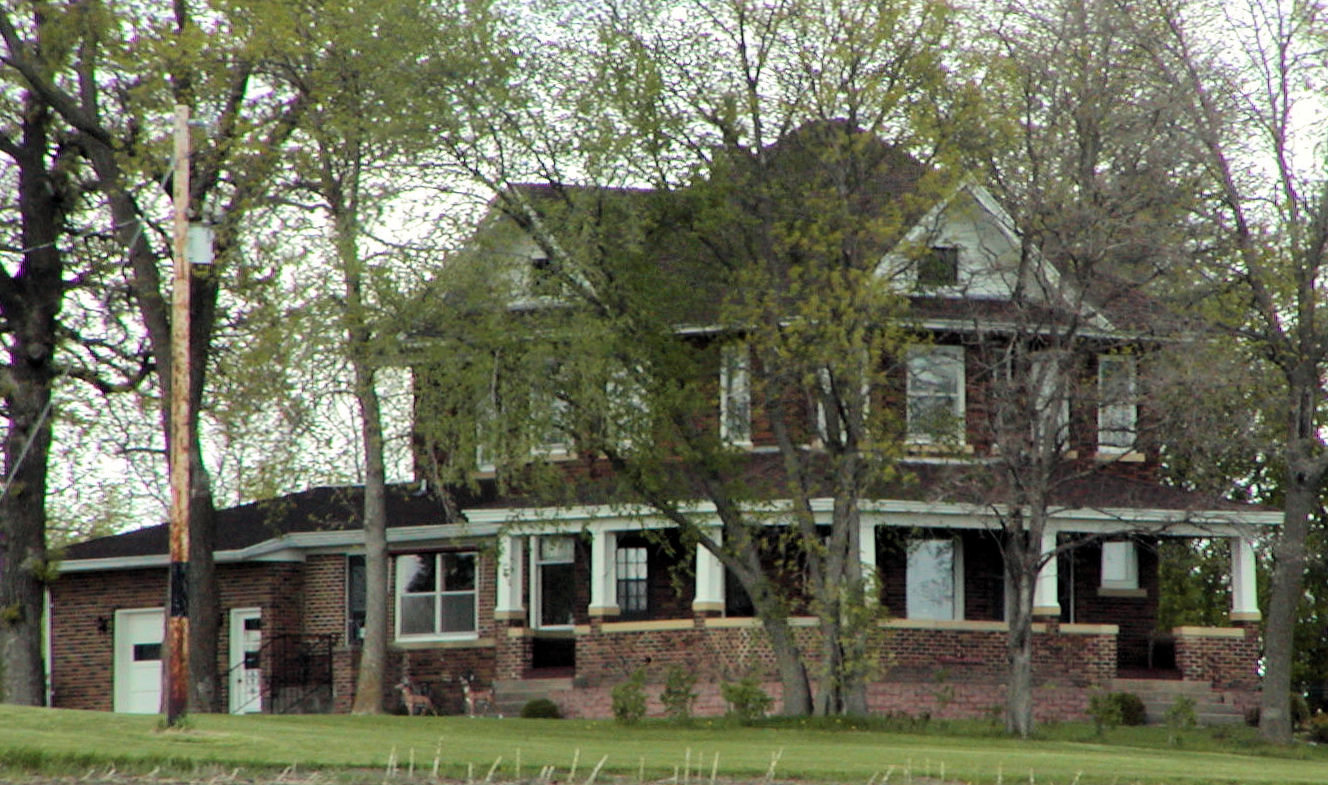
The 1920 farmhouse

The Wencl Kajer Farmstead is two miles (3.2 km) west of Elko New Market, Minnesota, in an agricultural landscape of rolling hills. The farmhouse is a two-story building of brick with a footprint of 26 feet (7.9 m) by 36 feet (11 m). A porch wraps around two sides. The roof is an intersecting gable with wide eaves. A mid-20th-century garage addition extends off the north end of the house. The round barn was a wood frame structure with a 60-foot (18 m) diameter. At the time of the National Register nomination, the barn had board and batten siding painted white. The conical roof was a shallow-angled gambrel surmounted by a cupola.

== History ==
Wencl Kajer of New Prague, Minnesota, purchased this land in 1907 and established a dairy farm. He had the round barn built in 1918 and the farmhouse in 1920. Kajer sold the thriving farm to new owners in 1955. They immediately modified the interior of the barn with 33 cow stalls, added a garage to the house and, in the early 1960s, built a feed room and a milk house extending off the barn. The property was still in use as a dairy farm when it was added to the National Register in 1980.

== See also ==
- National Register of Historic Places listings in Scott County, Minnesota
