= National Register of Historic Places listings in Scott County, Minnesota =

Location of Scott County in Minnesota

This is a list of the National Register of Historic Places listings in Scott County, Minnesota. It is intended to be a complete list of the properties and districts on the National Register of Historic Places in Scott County, Minnesota, United States. The locations of National Register properties and districts for which the latitude and longitude coordinates are included below, may be seen in an online map.

There are 21 properties and districts listed on the National Register in the county. A supplementary list includes four additional sites that were formerly on the National Register.

This National Park Service list is complete through NPS recent listings posted May 1, 2026.

== Current listings ==
	Name on the Register	Image	Date listed	Location	City or town	Description
1	Abraham Bisson House	Abraham Bisson House	April 17, 1980 (#80002164)	20150 County Rd. 57; 44°39′28″N 93°42′30″W	Jordan vicinity	1884 house notable for its local sandstone masonry and association with the now-vanished town of St. Lawrence.
2	Church of St. Wenceslaus	Church of St. Wenceslaus	February 19, 1982 (#82003035)	215–227 E. Main St. 44°32′39″N 93°34′27″W	New Prague	Religious and educational hub of a large Catholic Czech immigrant community, featuring a 1907 church, 1908 rectory, and 1914 parochial school.
3	Julius A. Coller House	Julius A. Coller House	April 17, 1980 (#80002168)	434 S. Lewis St. 44°47′41″N 93°31′29″W	Shakopee	1887 house of Julius A. Coller (1859–1940), a significant community leader who served 16 years as state senator. Also recognized as one of the best-preserved Scott County residences of its era.
4	Early Shakopee Houses	Early Shakopee Houses	April 17, 1980 (#80002169)	411 and 419 E. 2nd Ave. 44°47′54″N 93°31′18″W	Shakopee	Two adjacent houses built circa 1865, well-preserved examples of Shakopee's early residences.
5	Episcopal Church of the Transfiguration	Episcopal Church of the Transfiguration	April 17, 1980 (#80002159)	201 N. Walnut St. 44°37′28″N 93°45′48″W	Belle Plaine	Unusual 1869 Stick style church.
6	Foss and Wells House	Foss and Wells House	April 17, 1980 (#80002161)	613 S. Broadway St. 44°39′23″N 93°37′36″W	Jordan	Shared 1858 house of two families who co-owned one of Jordan's key gristmills. Also noted for its sandstone masonry and Italianate architecture.
7	Holmes Street Bridge	Holmes Street Bridge	July 6, 2010 (#10000414)	Holmes St. over the Minnesota River; 44°48′01″N 93°31′38″W	Shakopee	Rare Minnesota example of a deck truss bridge, built in 1927 by the Minneapolis Steel & Machinery Company.
8	Hooper-Bowler-Hillstrom House	Hooper-Bowler-Hillstrom House	April 17, 1980 (#80002160)	410 N. Cedar St. 44°37′36″N 93°45′56″W	Belle Plaine	Circa-1871 house significant as Scott County's best preserved 19th-century frame house and for its successive ownership by two prominent local businessmen. Now a house museum.
9	Inyan Ceyaka Otonwe	Inyan Ceyaka Otonwe	February 12, 1999 (#99000191)	Carver Rapids unit of Minnesota Valley State Recreation Area	Louisville Township	Precolumbian mounds and site of a post-contact Wahpeton Dakota village led by notable chief Mazomani.
10	Jordan Brewery Ruins	Jordan Brewery Ruins	April 17, 1980 (#80002162)	415 S. Broadway St. 44°39′48″N 93°37′32″W	Jordan	Prominent remains of a brewery complex active 1861–1948, one of the leading businesses that made Jordan into an early industrial center.
11	Jordan Historic District	Jordan Historic District	April 17, 1980 (#80002163)	Water St. and S. Broadway St. 44°39′55″N 93°37′34″W	Jordan	Scott County's best-preserved 19th-century business district, with 14 contributing properties mostly dating to Jordan's peak as a commercial center 1865–1880.
12	Wencl Kajer Farmstead	Wencl Kajer Farmstead	April 17, 1980 (#80002166)	County Highway 2; 44°34′30″N 93°23′33″W	New Market Township	Hilltop dairy farm established in 1907, a highly visible representative of local agricultural development, with a distinctive 1918 round barn and a 1920 brick farmhouse.
13	Maka Yusota	Maka Yusota	January 16, 2003 (#02001703)	Address restricted 44°46′14″N 93°23′52″W	Savage vicinity	A sacred spring important in Dakota history and culture.
14	Mudbaden Sulphur Springs Company	Mudbaden Sulphur Springs Company	April 17, 1980 (#80002165)	17706 Valley View Dr. 44°41′35″N 93°37′01″W	Jordan vicinity	1915 spa building of a popular health resort in operation 1890s–1947, serving patients and vacationers attracted to its sulfur-rich mud baths.
15	New Market Hotel and Store	New Market Hotel and Store	April 17, 1980 (#80002167)	441 Main St. 44°34′24″N 93°21′07″W	Elko New Market	Well-preserved example—built 1897—of Scott County towns' late-19th-century commercial buildings, and the only surviving example from New Market.
16	St. Mary's Church of the Purification	St. Mary's Church of the Purification	April 17, 1980 (#80002173)	15850 Marystown Rd. 44°43′13″N 93°32′31″W	Marystown	1882 Romanesque Revival church and associated buildings constructed 1893–1921, representative of the Catholic church properties around which many German American settlements grew in rural Scott County.
17	Ṡákpe Mounds–Pond Mounds Site	Ṡákpe Mounds–Pond Mounds Site	September 19, 2024 (#100010819)	1801 County Highway 101; 44°48′10″N 93°29′49″W	Shakopee	Well-preserved mound site with six visible burial mounds and numerous subsurface features built 500 BCE–1853 CE; significant in Mdewakanton tradition and culture and in Minnesota archaeology. Also a contributing property to the Shakopee Historic District.
18	Ṡákpe Mounds–Steele Mounds Site	Ṡákpe Mounds–Steele Mounds Site	September 19, 2024 (#100010820)	2187 County Highway 101; 44°48′10″N 93°28′54″W	Shakopee	Well-preserved mound site with 111 visible and subsurface mounds built 500 BCE–1853 CE; significant in Mdewakanton tradition and culture and in Minnesota archaeology. Partly a contributing property to the Shakopee Historic District.
19	Herman Schroeder House and Livery	Herman Schroeder House and Livery	January 19, 2023 (#100008547)	717–719 Bluff Ave. E. 44°48′03″N 93°31′05″W	Shakopee	Ornate 1880 house and outbuilding of Herman Schroeder (1854–1922), longtime owner of Shakopee's most successful brickyard and an influential civic leader.
20	Shakopee Historic District	Shakopee Historic District	April 11, 1972 (#72000682)	1801–2187 County Highway 101; 44°48′11″N 93°29′48″W	Shakopee	District encompassing ancient habitation sites and mounds, a contact-era Dakota village, and pioneer-era buildings and a ferry landing.
21	Strunk-Nyssen House	Strunk-Nyssen House	April 17, 1980 (#80002174)	11120 Chaparral Ave. 44°47′20″N 93°33′26″W	Shakopee vicinity	Circa-1856 house enlarged circa 1880, significant as the successive home of notable local brewers Herman H. Strunk and Hubert Nyssen and as an example of 19th-century vernacular architecture.

== Former listings ==
	Name on the Register	Image	Date listed	Date removed	Location	City or town	Description
1	Bridge No. L3040		November 6, 1989 (#89001829)	September 20, 2007	County Road 51, North of Minnesota State Highway 19	Belle Plaine	Unusually early stone arch road bridge, built 1878. Demolished in 2006.
2	Merchants Hotel		April 17, 1980 (#80002171)	September 25, 1987	211 E. 2nd St.	Shakopee	1865 hotel. Fell into disrepair and demolished in 1987.
3	Reis Block		April 17, 1980 (#80002172)	May 15, 1987	1st and Holmes Sts.	Shakopee	1883 Queen Anne commercial building with second-floor auditorium. Demolished by owner in 1986.
4	Roehl-Lenzmeier House		April 17, 1980 (#82003032)	June 11, 2003	10th Ave. W.	Shakopee vicinity	Circa-1860 stone farmhouse of a notable homesteader. Demolished in 2002.

== See also ==
- List of National Historic Landmarks in Minnesota
- National Register of Historic Places listings in Minnesota
