= Nyssen =

Nyssen is a surname. Notable people with the surname include:

- Françoise Nyssen (born 1951), French-Belgian publisher and politician
- Gregory Nyssen also known Gregory of Nyssa (c. 335–c. 395), was bishop of Nyssa from 372 to 376 and from 378 until his death
- Guillaume Nyssen (1886 –date of death unknown), Belgian racing cyclist
- Hubert Nyssen (1925–2011), Belgian-French writer, publisher and founder of the Éditions Actes Sud
- Jan Nyssen (born 1957), Belgian physical geographer

== See also ==
- Strunk–Nyssen House, is a home/hotel/brewery built by two brewers in Jackson Township, Minnesota, United States
- Ernest Nyssens (1868–1956), Belgian homeopath, naturopath, theosophist and vegetarianism activist
