= Credit River (Minnesota) =

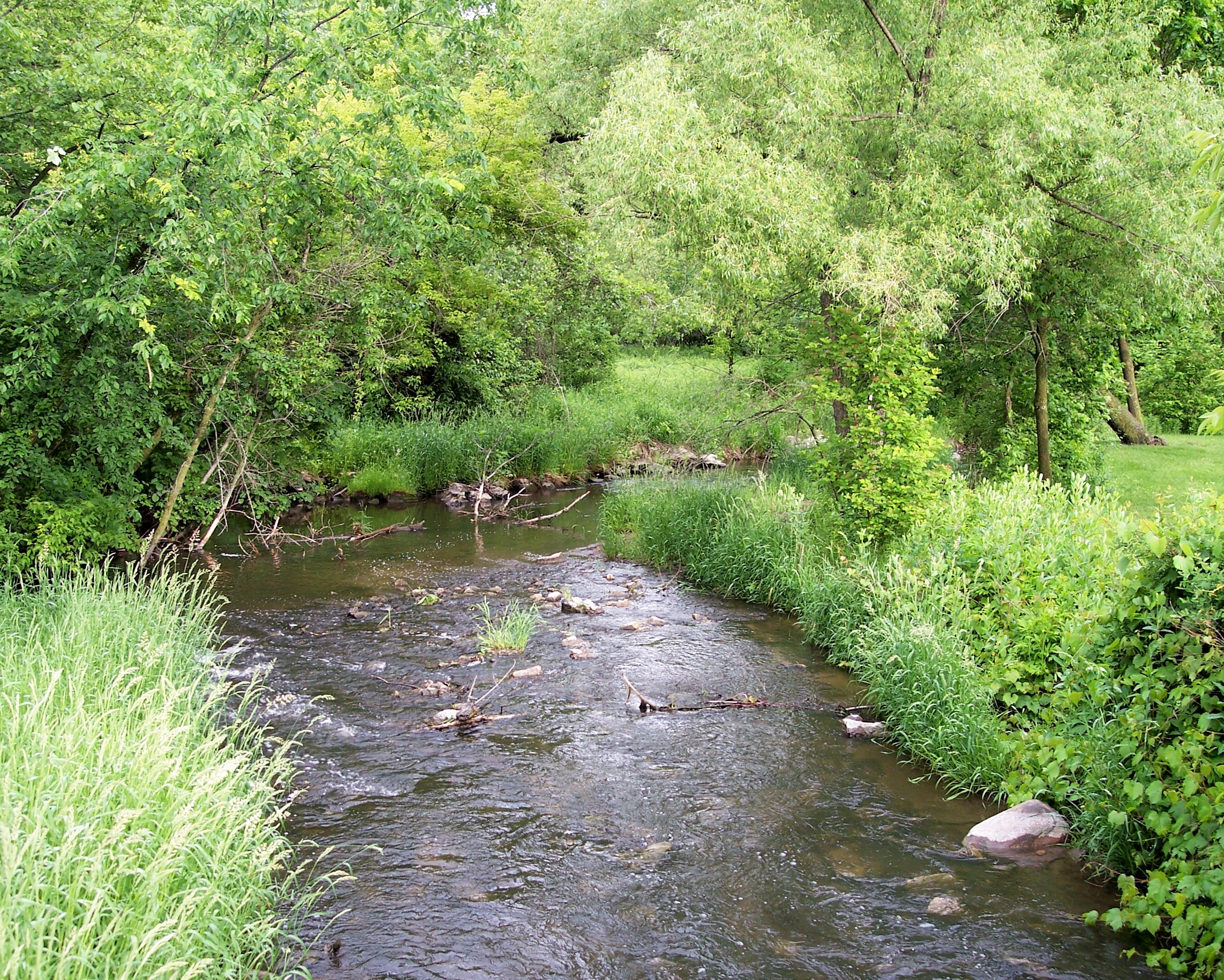
- The Credit River in a city park in Savage in 2007

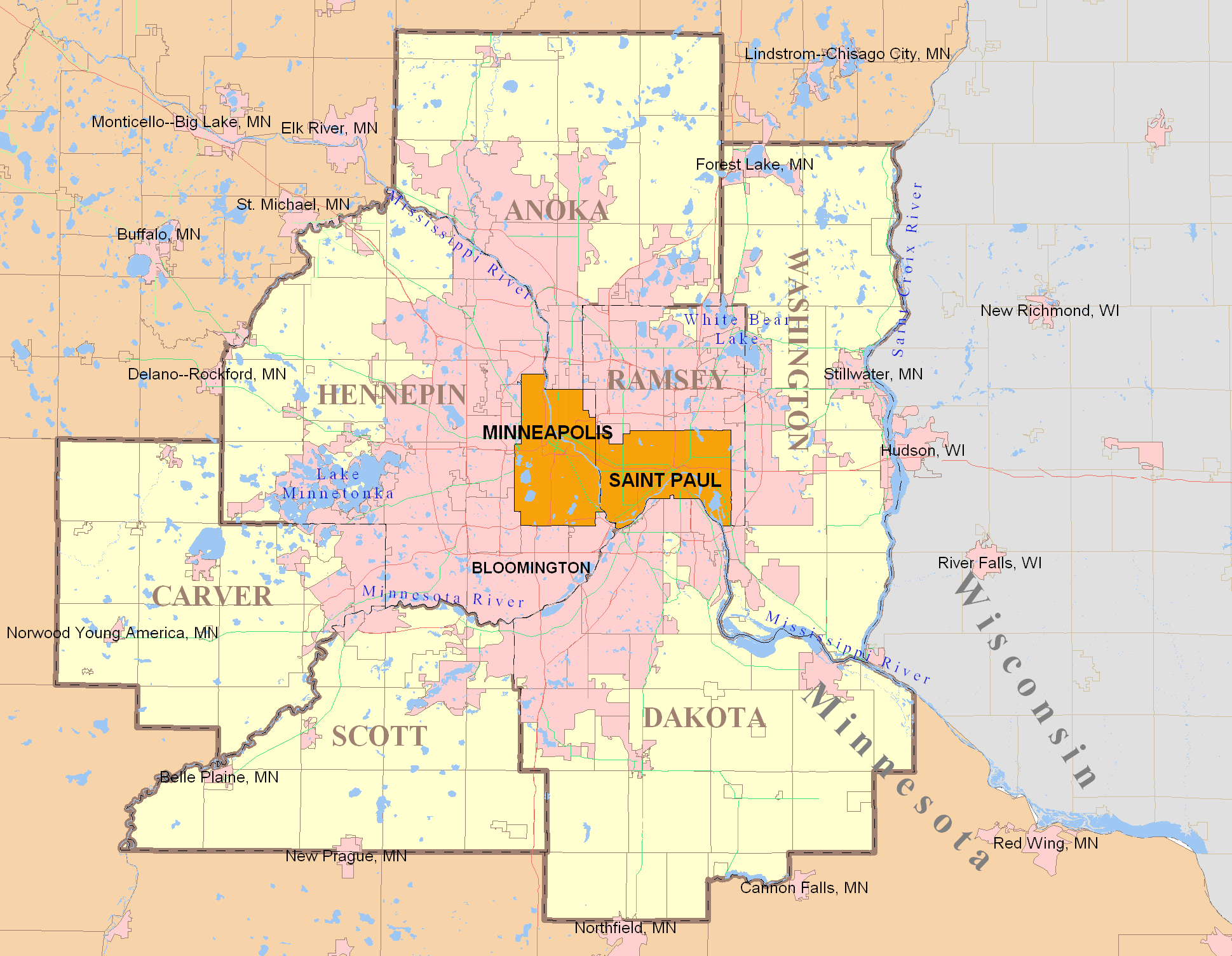
- Location of the mouth of the Credit River in Savage, Minnesota

Location
- Country: United States
- State: Minnesota

Physical characteristics
- Source
  - location: Elko New Market
  - coordinates: 44°34′13″N 93°20′13″W
  - elevation: 1,129 ft (344 m)
- Mouth: Minnesota River
  - location: Savage
  - coordinates: 44°47′14″N 93°20′32″W
  - elevation: 697 ft (212 m)
- Length: 21.5 mi (34.6 km)
- Basin size: 46.3 sq mi (120 km^{2})

The Credit River is a small tributary of the Minnesota River, 22 miles (35 km) long, in the southwestern Minneapolis-St. Paul metropolitan area in Minnesota in the United States. Via the Minnesota River, it is part of the watershed of the Mississippi River, draining an area of 46 square miles (120 km^{2}) in a suburban area. The stream flows for its entire length in eastern Scott County; its tributaries also drain a portion of western Dakota County.

The Credit River issues from a small lake in the city of Elko New Market in southeastern Scott County, and flows generally northward through the township of New Market and the cities of Credit River and Savage. It flows into the Minnesota River from the south in Savage, approximately 14 miles (22 km) south-southwest of downtown Minneapolis.

In 2002 the Minnesota Pollution Control Agency designated the Credit River as being impaired by turbidity. The agency removed the stream from its list of impaired waters in 2012 in light of monitoring data from 2008 to 2009 showing that excess turbidity was no longer present.

== See also ==
- List of rivers in Minnesota
