= Jordan Brewery Ruins =

Former brewery building in Minnesota, United States

- U.S. National Register of Historic Places
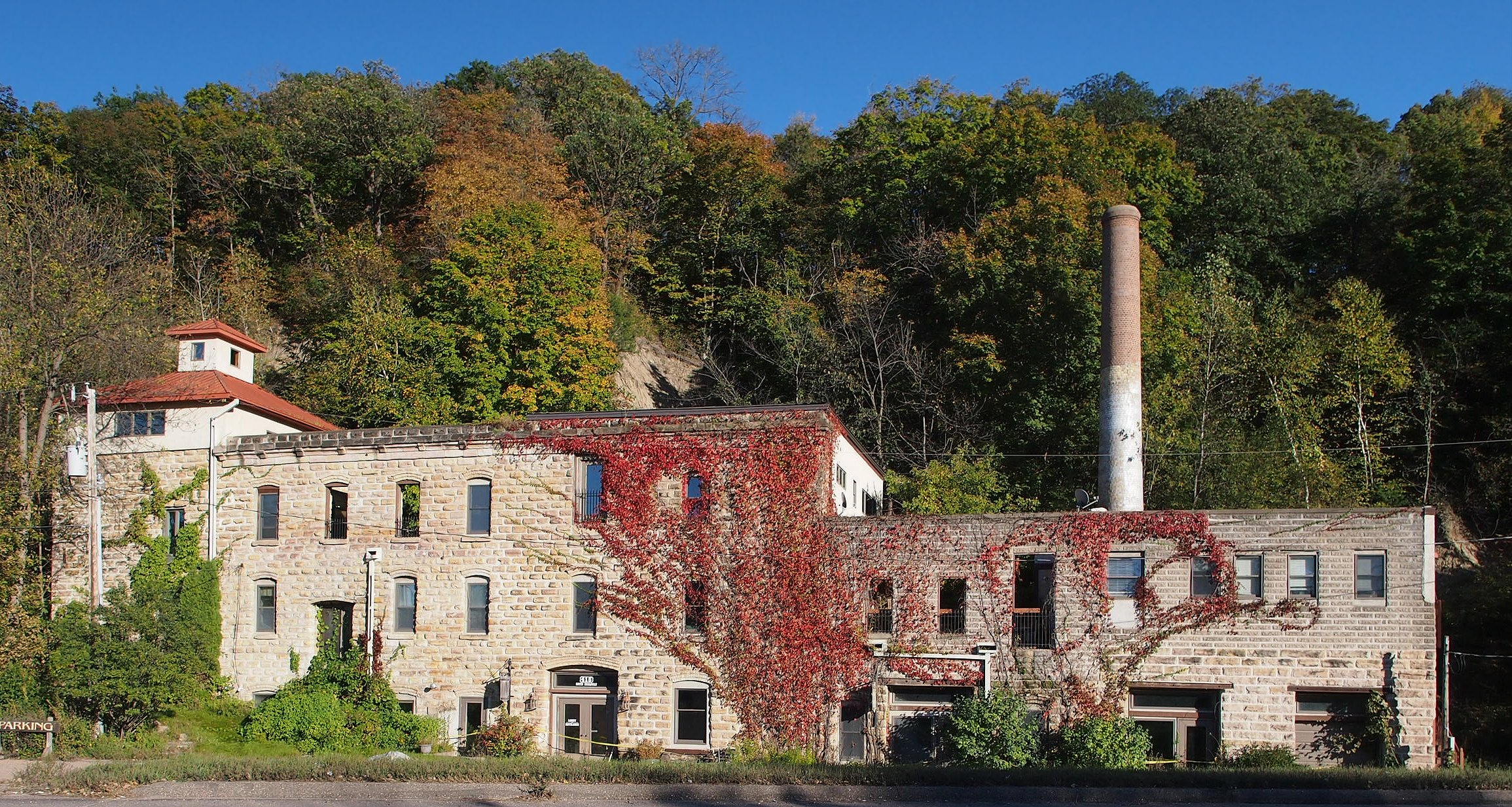
- The Jordan Brewery viewed from the west

- Location within Minnesota Location within the United States
- Location: 415 Broadway Street S., Jordan, Minnesota
- Coordinates: 44°39′48″N 93°37′33″W
- Area: 1.6 acres (0.65 ha)
- Built: c. 1861–c. 1934
- MPS: Scott County MRA
- NRHP reference No.: 80002162
- Added to NRHP: April 17, 1980

The Jordan Brewery Ruins comprise a former brewery complex in Jordan, Minnesota, United States. It operated from 1861 to 1948. A fire in 1954 gutted the building, which then stood vacant for decades. The property was listed on the National Register of Historic Places in 1980 for its significance in the themes of architecture and industry. It was nominated for being one of the few surviving 19th-century industrial buildings in Scott County, Minnesota, and one associated with its significant brewing industry.

== Description ==
The Jordan Brewery stands just south of downtown Jordan at the foot of a bluff that defines the edge of the Minnesota River Valley. The main building was constructed in two sections. Both are constructed of limestone ashlars. The northern section was built around 1861 and is 150 feet (46 m) long and 38 feet (12 m) deep. It rises three stories and has decorative brickwork around the windows and doors and along the roofline. The ground floor of the southern section was also built around 1861 and then given a second story around the beginning of the 20th century. This section has a tall brick chimney and simpler decoration.

The main building backs against the river bluff, into which caves were dug to provide natural refrigeration while the beer aged. A freestanding, one-story, brick building was constructed around 1934 just south of the main building to serve as a bottling plant, but is no longer extant.

== History ==
Jordan was an early industrial center in Scott County, and two breweries were established in the town in the 1860s. The Jordan Brewery was established in 1861 by Frank Nicolin and his sons. They sold the business to new owners before the end of the decade, and its products were better known under the name Schutz and Kaiser. In 1902 this partnership changed to Schutz and Hilgers.

A microbrewery was planned to open in the complex in 2014, but a mudslide triggered by heavy rains damaged the complex and temporarily left its future use in doubt. As of 2021, a medical cannabis dispensary operates in the former brewery.

== See also ==
- List of defunct breweries in the United States
- National Register of Historic Places listings in Scott County, Minnesota
