= New Market Hotel and Store =

Historic commercial building in Minnesota, United States

- U.S. National Register of Historic Places
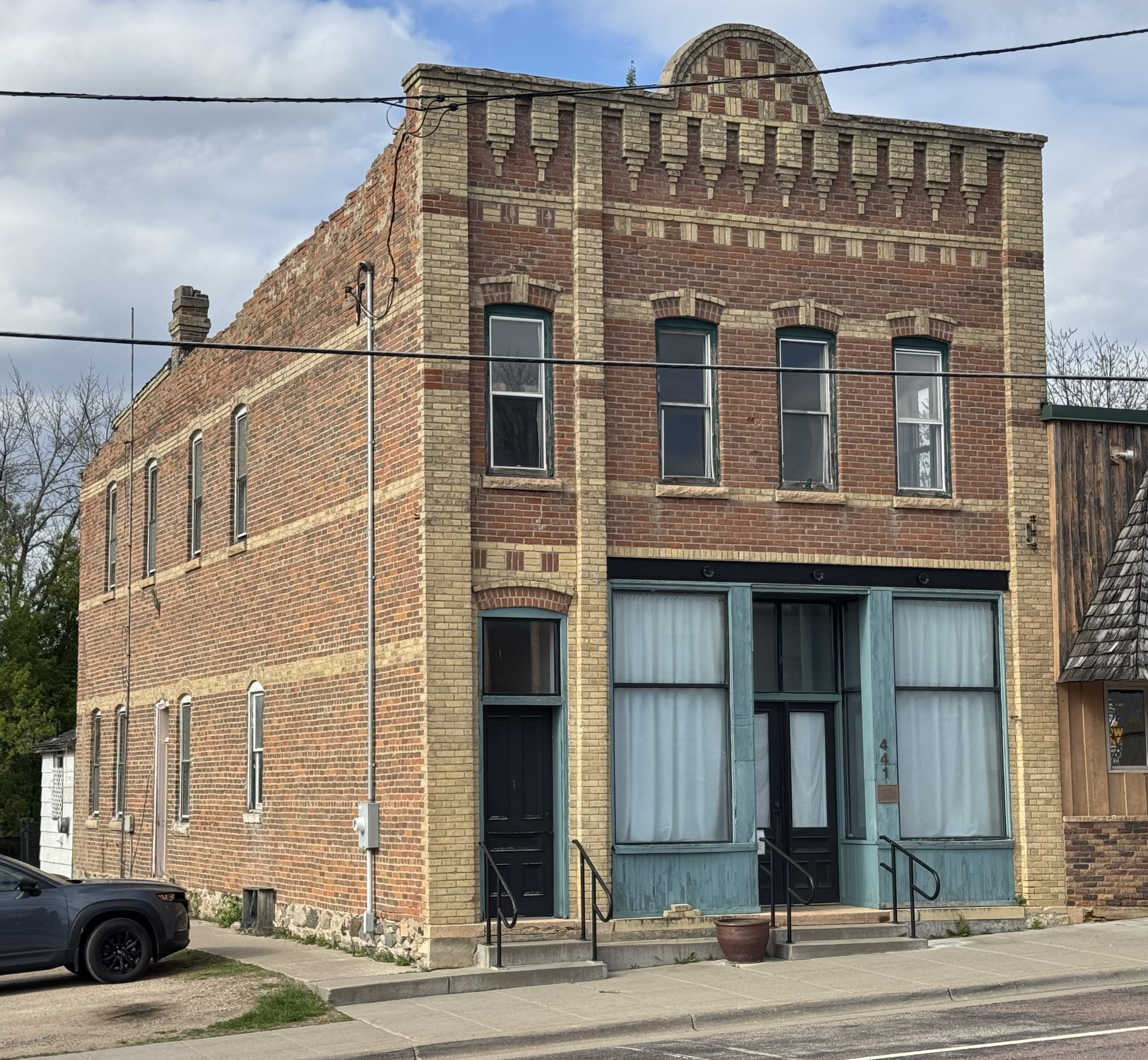
- New Market Hotel and Store from the southwest in 2026

- Location within Minnesota Location within the United States
- Location: 441 Main Street, Elko New Market, Minnesota
- Coordinates: 44°34′23.7″N 93°21′6.9″W
- Area: Less than one acre
- Built: 1897
- Built by: Joseph Baltes
- MPS: Scott County MRA
- NRHP reference No.: 80002167
- Added to NRHP: April 17, 1980

The New Market Hotel and Store is a historic commercial building in Elko New Market, Minnesota, United States. It was built in 1897 to house a general store at ground level and a small hotel on the second floor. The property was listed on the National Register of Historic Places in 1980 for its significance in the themes of architecture and commerce. It was nominated for being a well-preserved example of the late-19th-century commercial buildings constructed along the main streets of towns in Scott County, Minnesota, and the only surviving example from New Market.

== Description ==
The New Market Hotel and Store stands on the north side of New Market's small business district. It has a footprint of about 26 feet (7.9 m) by 70 feet (21 m) and rises two stories. It is constructed of red brick, with yellow brick pilasters and detailing. At ground level the main façade has a three-bay storefront on the right and a narrow bay on the left with a single door opening onto a staircase to the second floor. The second story has four double-hung two-over-two windows with stone window sills and lightly arched brick lintels. The top of the main façade has a cornice highly ornamented with contrasting red and yellow brick relief and a semicircular projection at center.

== See also ==
- National Register of Historic Places listings in Scott County, Minnesota
