= Strunk =

Strunk is a German surname, originating from the Middle High German word strunc and the Middle Low German word strunk/stronk meaning "stump", "stem of a cabbage plant", and "stalk", which was used as a nickname for "a short, stout, ungainly person"; it was also used as "a topographic name for someone who lived in an area with tree trunks" or a vegetable field. There are 2105 people with this surname in Germany, mostly in the west of the country. As of 2010, there were 8129 people in the United States with this surname. A spelling variant of the surname is Strunck, with 337 bearers in Germany.

== Strunk ==
- Amos Strunk (1889–1979), American baseball player
- Amy Adams Strunk (born 1955), American businesswoman
- Franziskus Strunk (1844–1922), abbot of Oelenberg Abbey
- Gerhard Strunk (1935–2009), German educator
- Heinrich Strunk (1883–1952), German politician
- Heinz Strunk (born 1962), German novelist, humorist musician and actor
- Hermann Strunk (1882–1933), German educator and politician
- Jennifer Strunk (born 1980), German chemist and university professor
- Jud Strunk (1936–1981), American singer-songwriter and comedian
- Klaus Strunk (1930–2018), German linguist and Indo-Europeanist
- Marion Strunk (born 1949), German installation and photo artist
- Mirjam Strunk (born 1974), German playwright and director
- Nils Strunk (born 1990), German actor and musician
- Oliver Strunk (1901–1980), American musicologist
- Paul Strunk (1909–1972), German SS Hauptscharführer
- Peter Strunk (1929–2020), German psychiatrist, psychotherapist and university professor
- Reiner Strunk (1941–2023), German Protestant theologian
- Roger Lawrence Strunk, popularly known as Rod Lauren (1941–2007), American actor and singer
- Roland Strunk (d. 1937), German journalist and war correspondent
- Werner Strunk (born 1952), German footballer
- William Strunk Jr. (1869–1946), American professor and author
  - Strunk & White (The Elements of Style), a style guide to writing American English

== Strunck/Strungk ==
- August Strunck (1878–1962), German politician
- Christina Strunck (born 1970), German art historian
- Delphin Strungk (or Strunck, 1600/1601–1694), German composer and organist
- Erich Strunck, a Nazi German spy in the United States, of the Duquesne Spy Ring
- James E. Strunck (1910–1988), American lawyer, politician, and judge
- Michael Strunck (born 1954), German footballer
- Nicklas Strunck (born 1999), Danish footballer
- Nicolaus Adam Strungk (or Strunck, 1640–1700), German composer and violinist

== See also ==
- Strunk–Nyssen House, Jackson Township, Minnesota, United States
- Theodor Strünck (1895–1945), German lawyer and resistance fighter
