= Church of St. Wenceslaus (New Prague, Minnesota) =

Historic church in Minnesota, United States

- Church of St. Wenceslaus--Catholic
- U.S. National Register of Historic Places
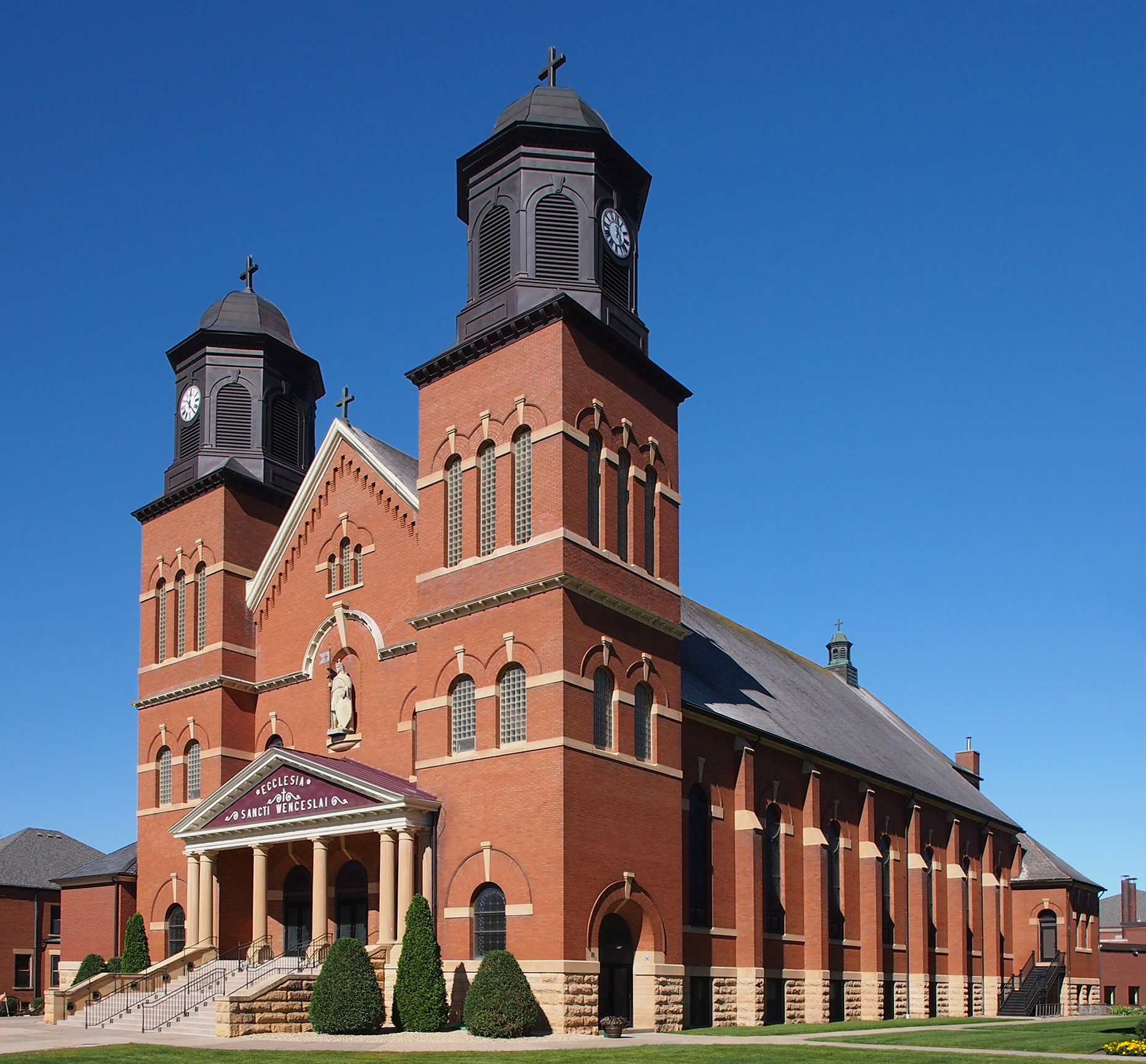
- The Church of St. Wenceslaus from the southeast

- Location within Minnesota Location within the United States
- Location: 215 Main Street E., New Prague, Minnesota
- Coordinates: 44°32′39″N 93°34′27″W
- Area: 3 acres (1.2 ha)
- Built: 1907 (church), 1908 (rectory), 1914 (school)
- Built by: A. Kropf
- Architect: Hermann Kretz
- Architectural style: Georgian Revival, Romanesque Revival
- Website: npcatholic.org/st-wenceslaus
- NRHP reference No.: 82003035
- Designated NRHP: February 19, 1982

The Church of St. Wenceslaus is a Catholic church in New Prague, Minnesota, United States, constructed in 1907. The church is flanked by a 1908 rectory and a 1914 parochial school, and the three-building complex is listed on the National Register of Historic Places for its association with the Czech American settlement of south-central Minnesota.

== History ==
The group of immigrants who settled New Prague had originally settled around Dubuque, Iowa, but many of them died of cholera. Four men from the community traveled up the Mississippi River to Saint Paul in search of a healthier climate. They met with Catholics in the area who advised them that Benedictines from Saint John's Abbey near Saint Cloud, Minnesota, were helping settlers find land. The explorers from the Czech community got lost, though, and ended up following the Minnesota River to Shakopee instead. They found that there was ample land to the south, so the four men purchased land and brought their families north from Iowa.

The parish of St. Wenceslaus was organized in 1856, and a log church was built the following year. The log church was destroyed by fire in 1864, so a more permanent building was erected in 1866, built of brick and stone. As the parish grew, more room was needed. Father Francis Tichy directed the building of the new church, which was designed by Saint Paul architect Hermann Kretz. The building was originally slated to cost $53,000, but cost overruns raised the cost to $85,000. As a result of dissatisfaction over the costs, Father Tichy resigned from the parish in 1906, and his successor Father Jaroslav Cermak oversaw the completion of the building. Archbishop John Ireland dedicated the new building on July 7, 1907.

Brick and Kasota limestone were used for constructing the spacious building. It dominates the skyline of the small city of New Prague, measuring 165 by 67 feet (50 by 20 m), with two towers that rise 110 feet (34 m). The architectural style combines neoclassical and Romanesque architectural styles, and it is based on a church in Prague, Czech Republic. The church's namesake, Wenceslaus I, Duke of Bohemia, was born near Prague circa 907 CE. A statue of King Wenceslaus is located in a niche above the main entrance. A large pipe organ at the rear of the church was operational until the 2000s.

The church, rectory, and school were listed together on the National Register of Historic Places in 1982 for their local significance in the themes of education, exploration/settlement, and religion. The three-building complex was nominated for its association with the Czech American settlement of south-central Minnesota.

As of 2009, there were about 1,440 member families in the St. Wenceslaus parish, making it the largest parish in the local area. A consolidation plan announced in October 2010 by the Archdiocese of St. Paul and Minneapolis called for five much smaller parishes in the area to be merged into St. Wenceslaus parish. After the plan was revised to consolidate one of the smallest parishes into a different receiving church, St. Wenceslaus became the receiving parish for the former parishes of St. Benedict in New Prague, St. Joseph in Lexington, St. John the Evangelist in Union Hill, and St. Scholastica in Heidelberg. The St. Benedict and St. Joseph churches were closed, while the St. John the Evangelist and St. Scholastica churches are still being used for worship as parts of the "greater St. Wenceslaus community".

St. Wenceslaus parish operates an elementary school that enrolls children from pre-kindergarten through eighth grade.

== See also ==
- List of Catholic churches in the United States
- National Register of Historic Places listings in Scott County, Minnesota
