= Herman Schroeder House and Livery =

Historic house in Minnesota, United States

- U.S. National Register of Historic Places
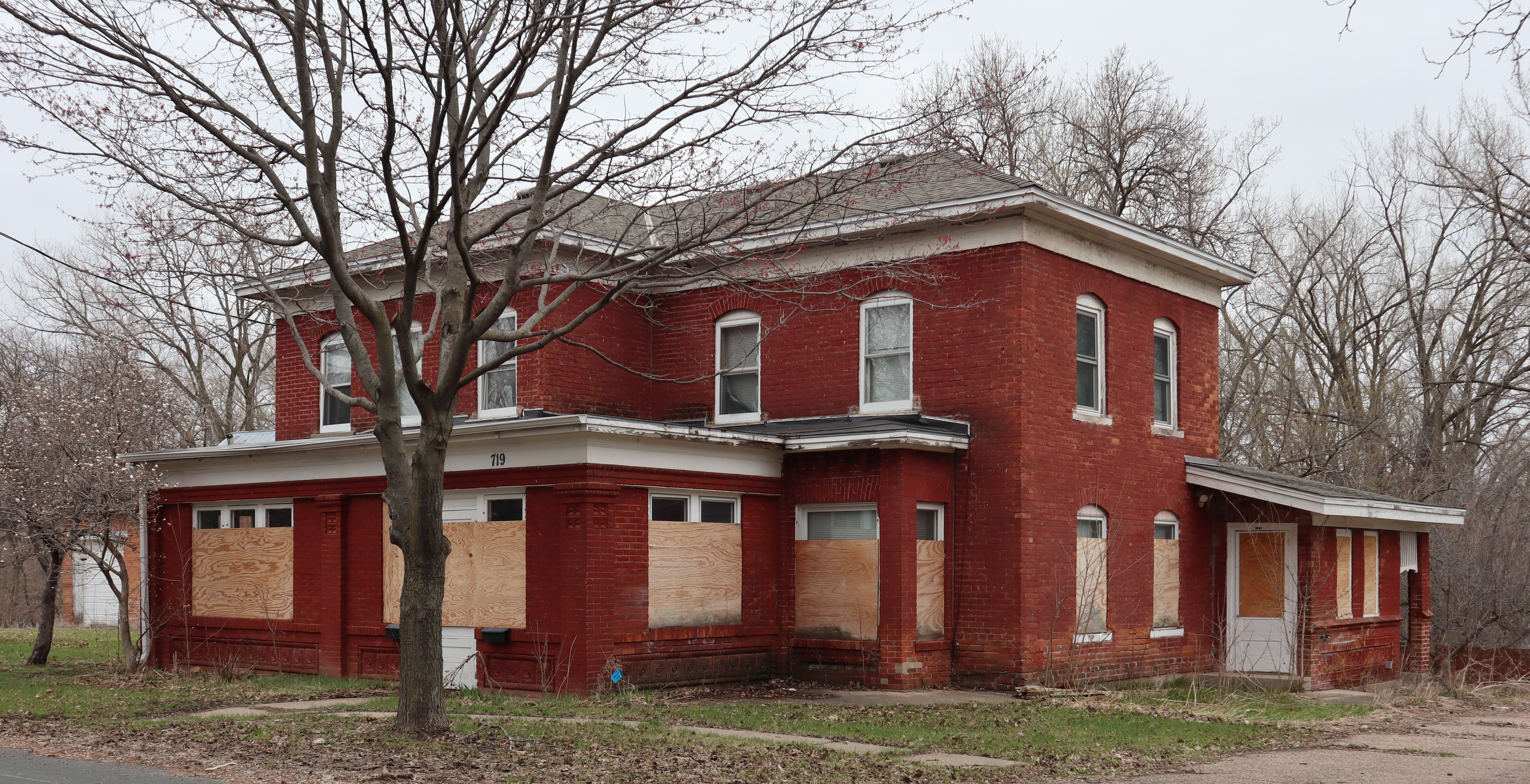
- The Herman Schroeder House viewed from the southwest

- Location within Minnesota Location within the United States
- Location: 717–719 Bluff Avenue E., Shakopee, Minnesota
- Coordinates: 44°48′3″N 93°31′4″W
- Area: 0.687657 acres (0.278285 ha)
- Built: 1880
- Architect: Unknown
- Architectural style: Vernacular
- NRHP reference No.: 100008547
- Added to NRHP: January 19, 2023

The Herman Schroeder House and Livery is a historic residence in Shakopee, Minnesota, United States. The house and outbuilding were constructed in 1880 for Herman Schroeder (1854–1922), the longtime owner of Shakopee's most successful brickyard and an influential civic leader. Both buildings feature ornate brick detailing, including on an outhouse addition to the livery. The property was listed on the National Register of Historic Places in 2023 for its significance in the theme of art. It was nominated for its association with Schroeder, a German immigrant whose signature red "Shakopee" bricks were used in numerous buildings throughout the region.

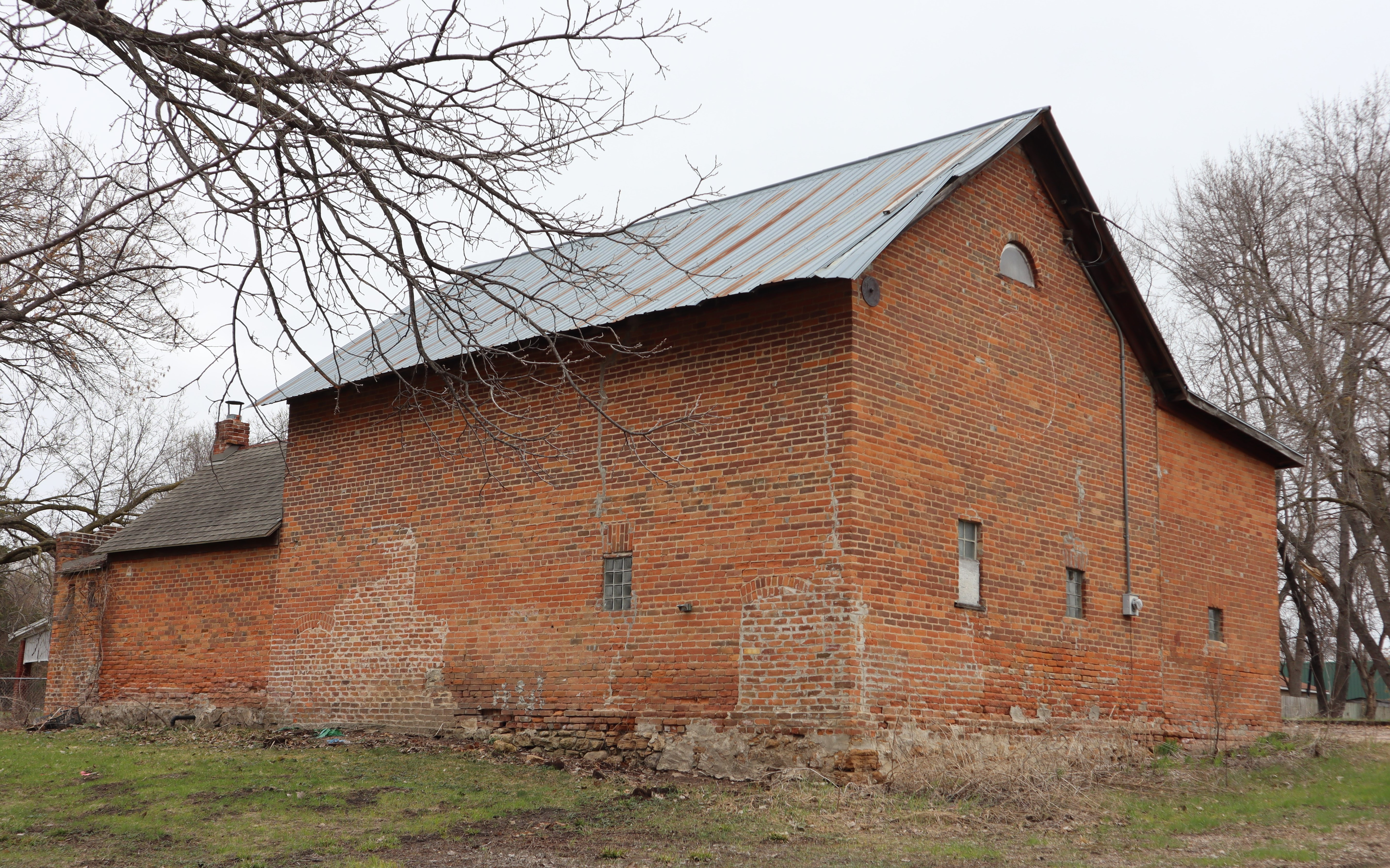
The Herman Schroeder Livery viewed from the northwest

== See also ==
- National Register of Historic Places listings in Scott County, Minnesota
