= Shakopee Historic District =

Historic district in Minnesota, United States

- U.S. National Register of Historic Places
- U.S. Historic district
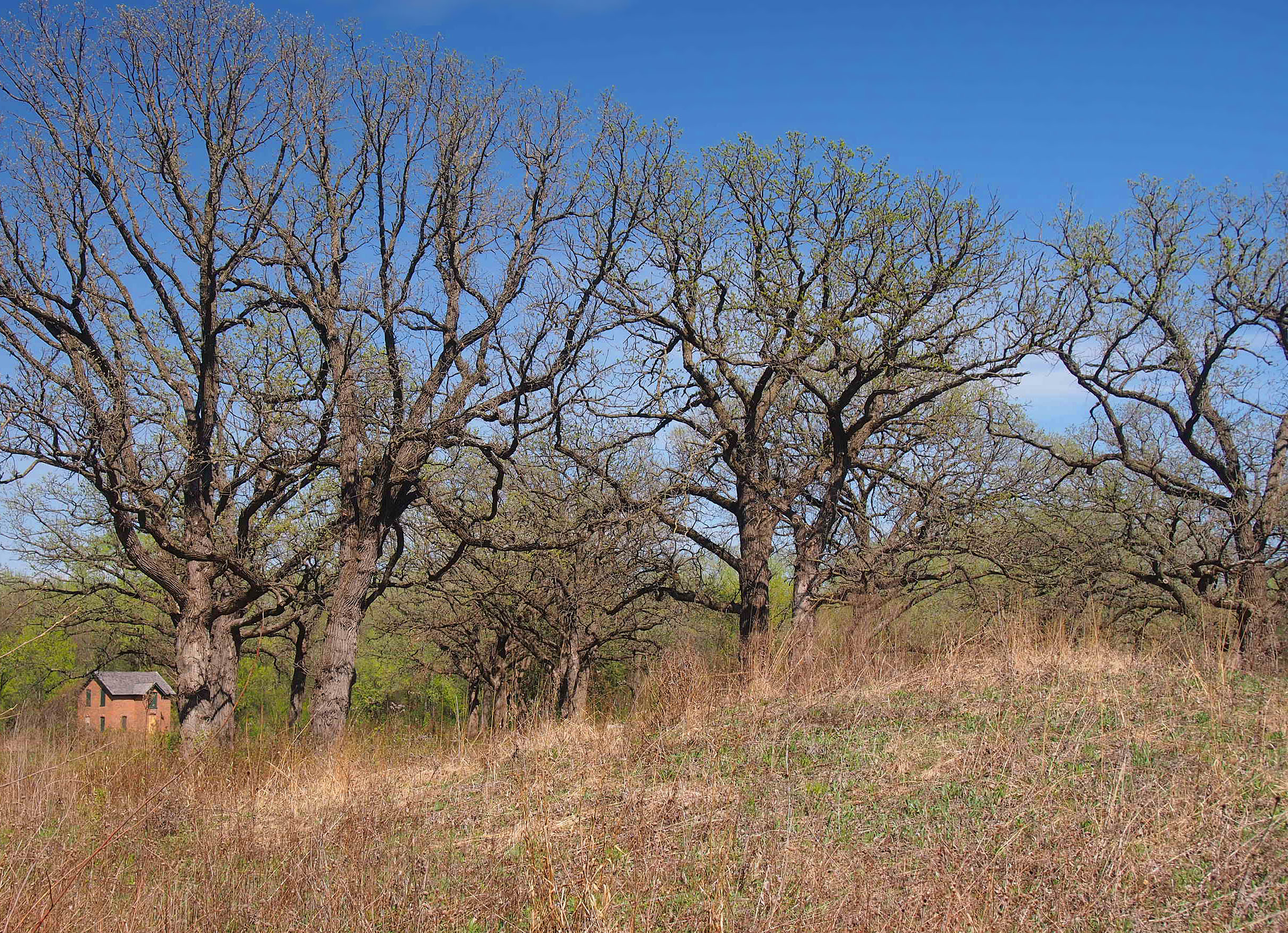
- A mound and early brick building in Shakopee Historic District

- Location within Minnesota Location within the United States
- Location: 1801–2187 County Highway 101, Shakopee, Minnesota
- Coordinates: 44°48′11″N 93°29′40″W
- Area: 76 acres (31 ha)
- Built: 300 BCE–1875
- MPS: Scott County MRA (AD)
- NRHP reference No.: 72000682
- Added to NRHP: April 11, 1972

The Shakopee Historic District is a historic district in Shakopee, Minnesota, United States. Stretching along the south bank of the Minnesota River, it encompasses pre-contact Native American habitation and burial sites, a contact-era Dakota village, early Euro-American buildings, and a ferry landing. The property was listed on the National Register of Historic Places in 1972 for its significance in the themes of prehistoric archaeology, aboriginal historical archaeology, non-aboriginal historical archaeology, and architecture.

The western end of the district has been developed into Shakopee's Memorial Park, while the eastern side is The Landing, a living history village operated by Three Rivers Park District.

== History ==
Native Americans were using the site as far back as 300 BCE. Over the centuries they constructed numerous mounds. By the late 17th century, the occupants can be identified as members of the Santee band of Eastern Dakota. By at least 1800, the village was led by a series of successive chiefs named Shakopee. This village of bark lodges and cornfields is well represented in the writings of early Euro-American explorers and settlers, such as Stephen Harriman Long, who passed through in 1823. Beginning in 1839 a Native American trained in European agricultural methods was sent to the village. In 1844 Oliver Faribault, the biracial son of trader Jean-Baptiste Faribault, moved to the area and built the first European-style house in what would become Scott County. Two years later Chief Shakopee II invited Protestant missionary Samuel W. Pond to move there to open a school and mission. In 1858 a warband of Ojibwe attacked the village in what became known as the Battle of Shakopee. Samuel Pond's two sons built a gristmill in 1875 that remains extant.

The area began to be developed as an open-air museum in 1969. Oliver Faribault's cabin was moved onto the property, as were four buildings from the farm of an early German immigrant family, the Bergers. Numerous historical buildings and some replicas have been added since.

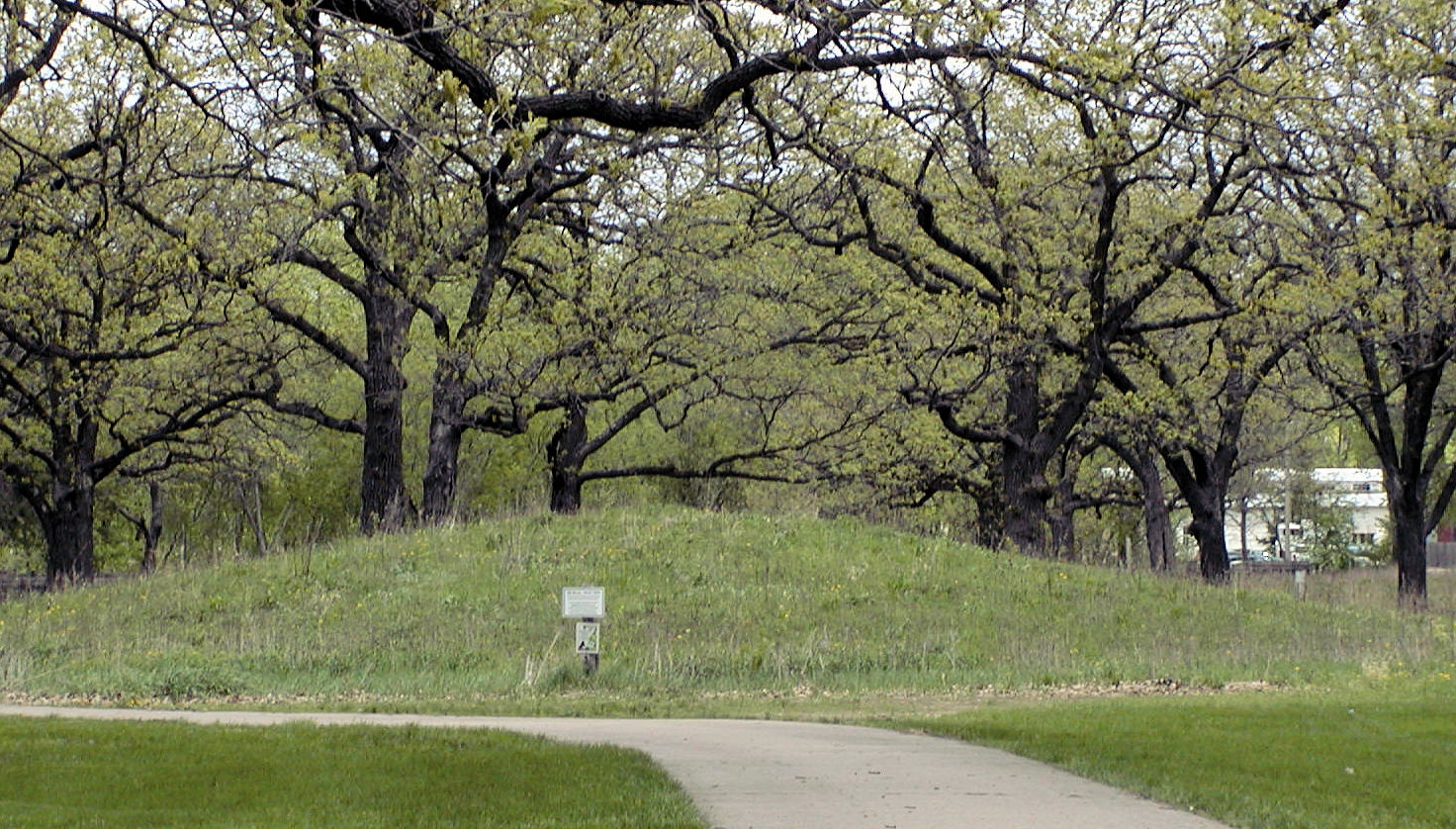
Prehistoric burial mounds

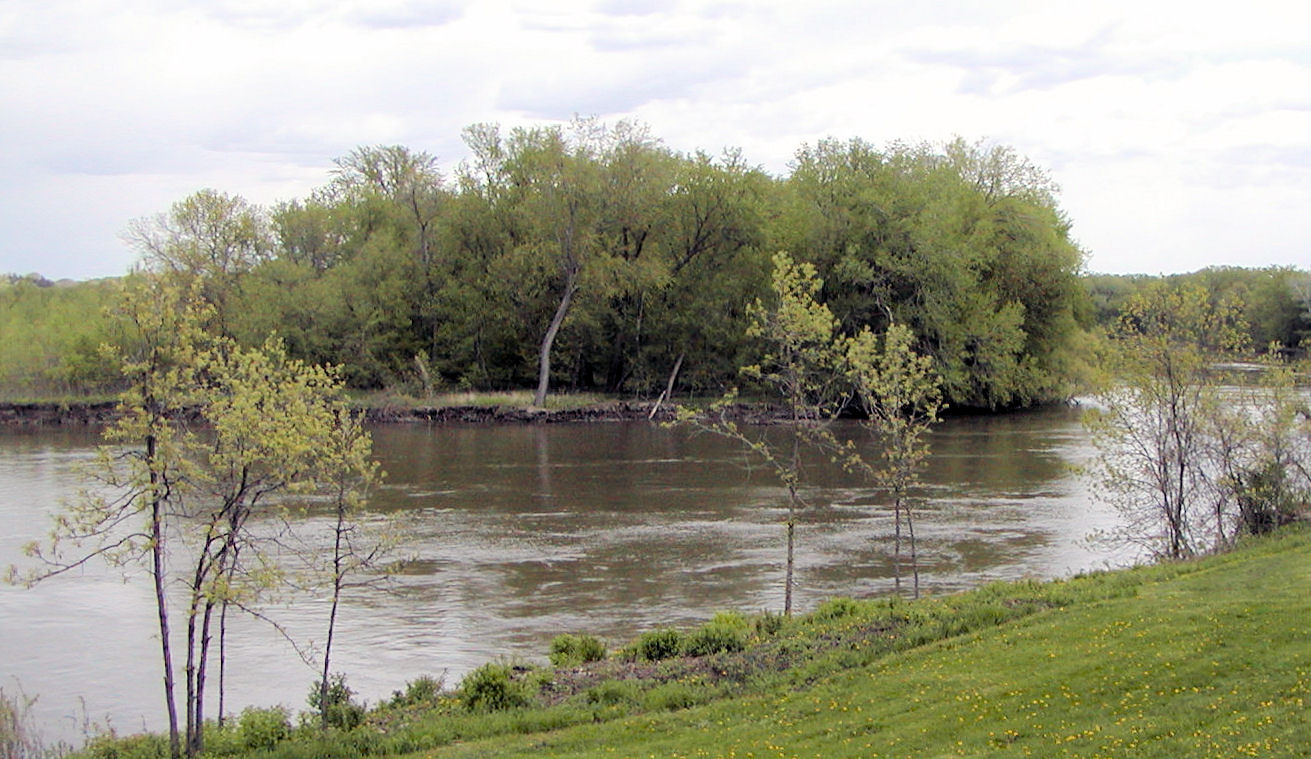
Site of Murphy's Landing

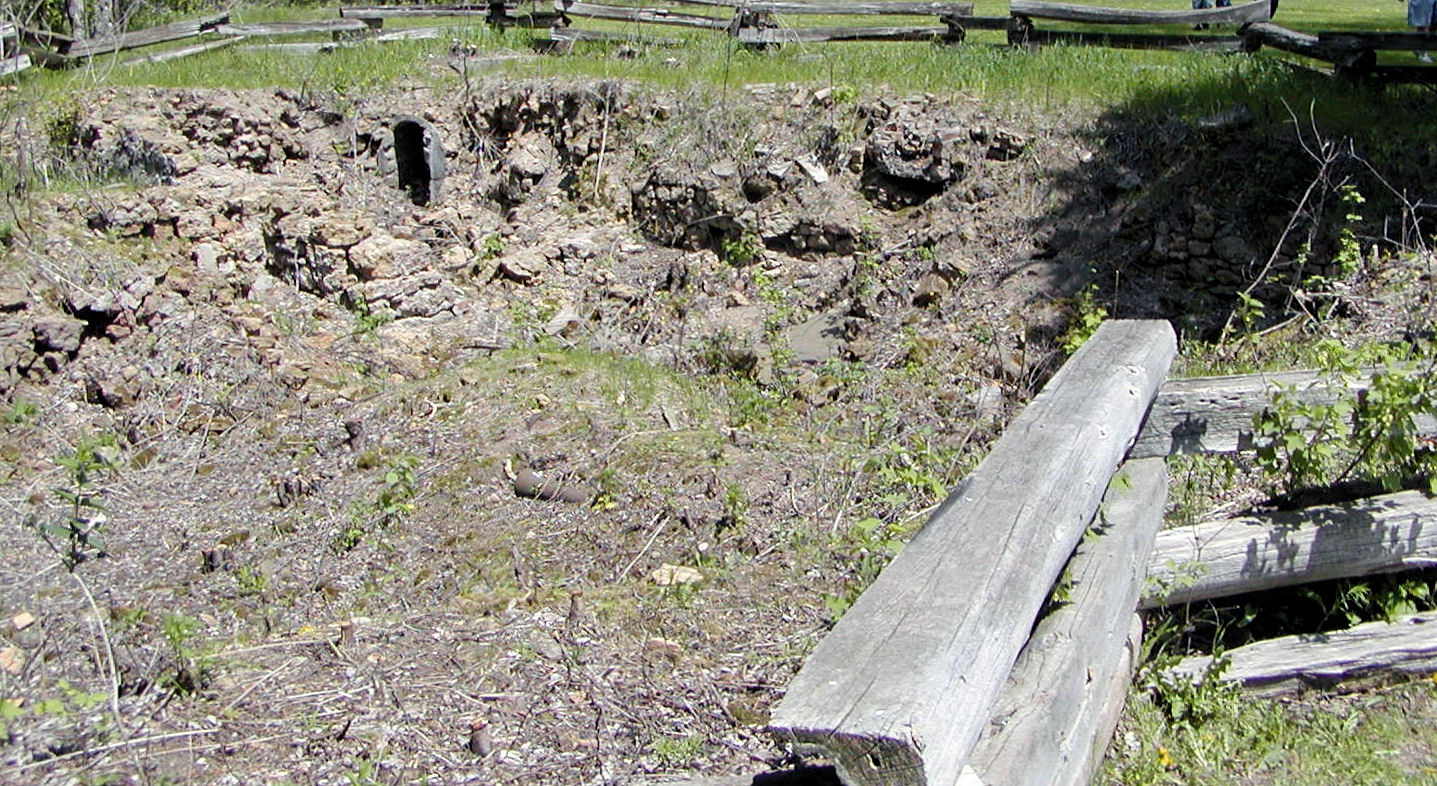
Ruins of Murphy's Inn

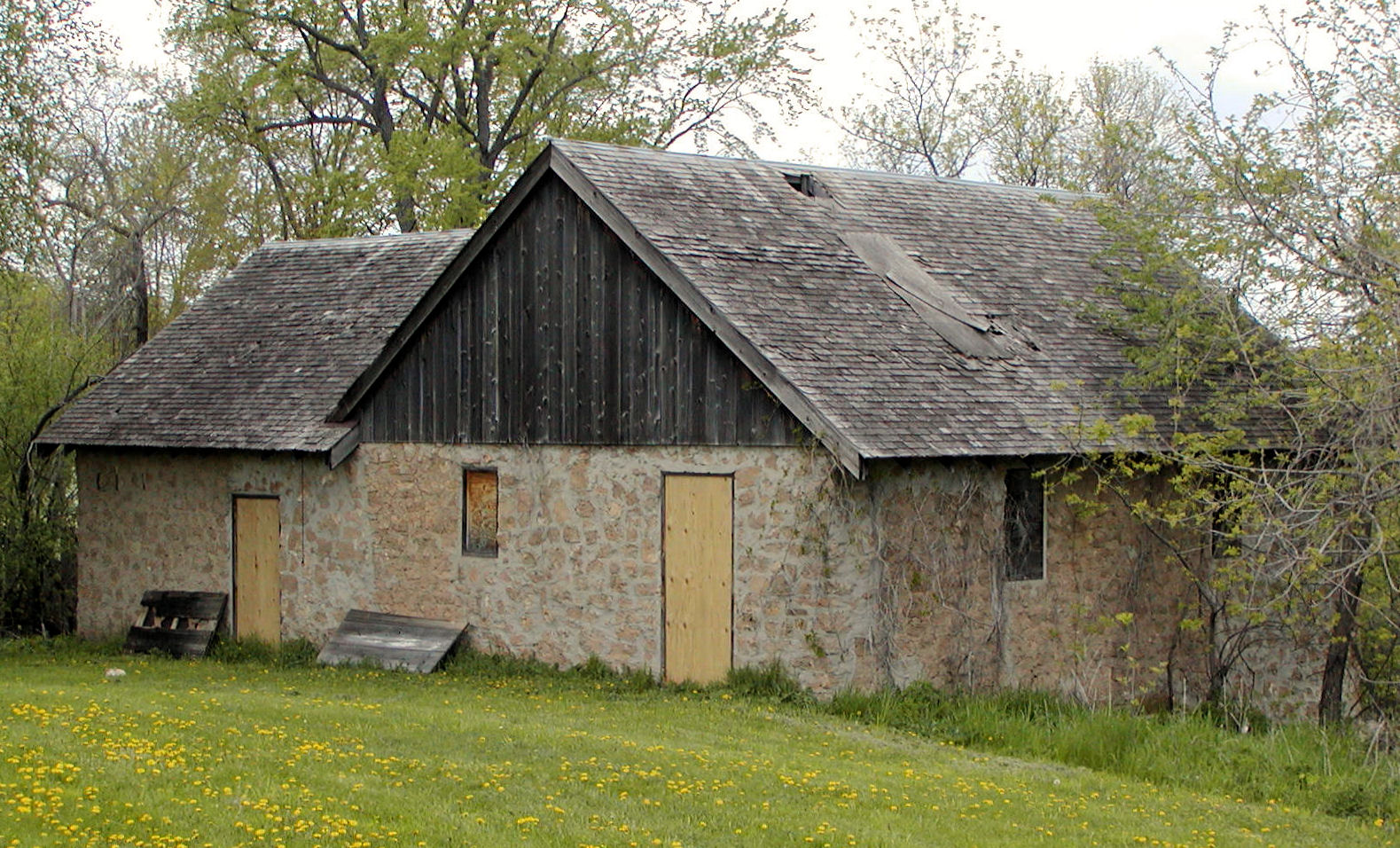
The Pond Gristmill

== See also ==
- National Register of Historic Places listings in Scott County, Minnesota
