= Hooper–Bowler–Hillstrom House =

Historic house museum in Minnesota, United States

- U.S. National Register of Historic Places
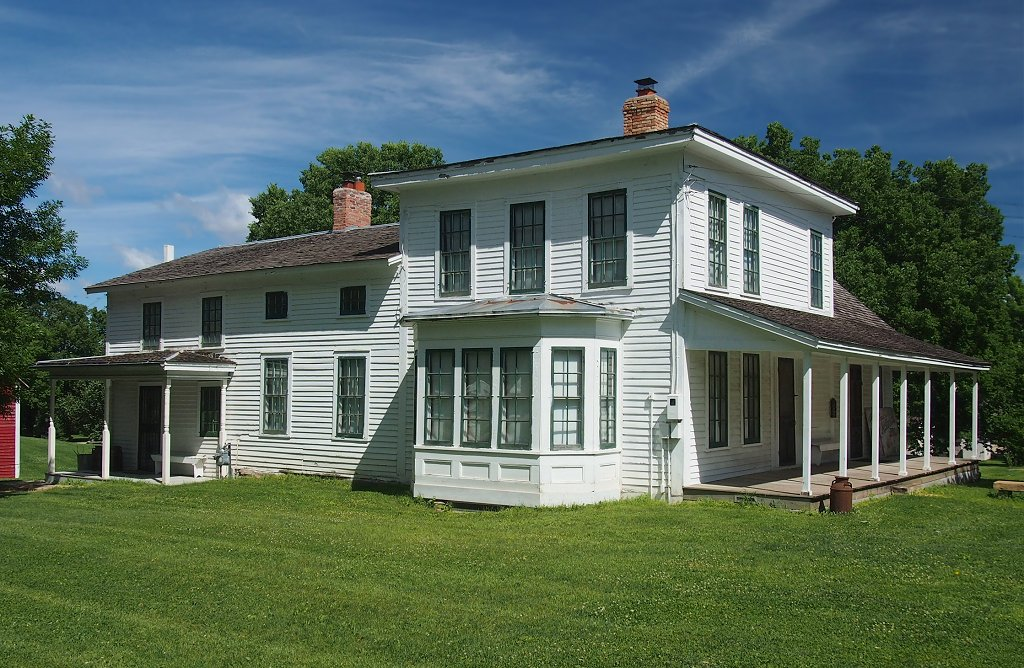
- The Hooper–Bowler–Hillstrom House from the southeast

- Location within Minnesota Location within the United States
- Location: 410 N. Cedar Street, Belle Plaine, Minnesota
- Coordinates: 44°37′35.6″N 93°45′56″W
- Area: 2 acres (0.81 ha)
- Built: Circa 1871
- Architectural style: Vernacular
- MPS: Scott County MRA
- NRHP reference No.: 80002160
- Added to NRHP: April 17, 1980

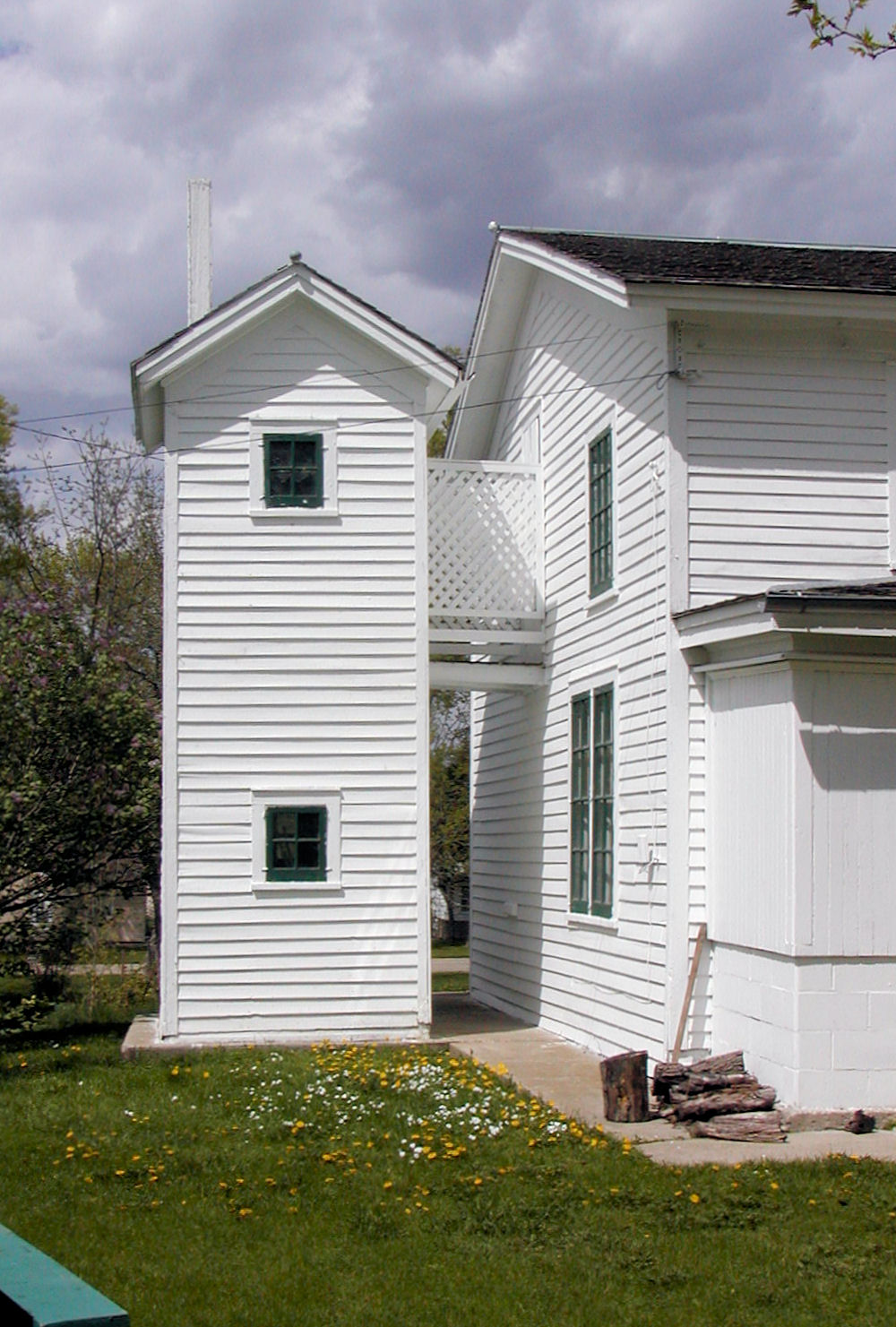
The home's two-story outhouse, connected via skyway

The Hooper–Bowler–Hillstrom House is a historic house museum in Belle Plaine, Minnesota, United States. The original section of the house was built around 1871. The second owner built an addition in the late 1880s that includes a two-story outhouse connected to the house via a skyway. The property was listed on the National Register of Historic Places in 1980 for its significance in the themes of architecture and commerce. It was nominated for being Scott County's best preserved 19th-century frame house and for its successive ownership by two prominent local businessmen.

== Description ==
The Hooper–Bowler–Hillstrom House is a two-story frame building with white clapboard siding. The original section bears elements of simplified Italianate architecture in its cubical massing, shallow hip roof, and narrow windows. The south elevation of this section has a large bay window on the ground floor. Shortly after the original construction, a 1½-story wing was added to the north and integrated into the earlier section with a full-length porch along the eastern elevation.

A two-story, gable roofed addition was built onto the west side of the original section in the late 1880s, along with the two-story outhouse. The outhouse has two seats on the ground floor and three on the upper floor, which is connected to the house by a three-foot-long (0.9 m) skyway. The waste from the upper level falls behind a false wall in the lower level.

Additional features include a water well pump in the kitchen, a wood-burning stove, and a large carriage stone on the front lawn, which acted as a step for ascending into or descending from carriages. Surviving outbuildings include a wood shed used to store coal and wood to fuel the stoves in the house and a brick smokehouse. Furnishing include a "courting chair" in which young couples would sit back-to-back.

== History ==
The first owner of the house, Commodore Sandford A. Hooper, was in residence from the time of construction around 1871 until 1883. He was an early settler and promoter of Belle Plain who prospered as a businessman and was mentioned frequently in area newspapers. The home was purchased in 1886 by Samuel Bowler, a founder of the State Bank of Belle Plaine and a lumber-yard owner. A man with a large family, Bowler added the west wing, a new kitchen, a buttery, a copper-lined bathtub, and the two-story outhouse. The outhouse served to accommodate family members with bedrooms on the second floor, and as an outward sign of the family's wealth. In 1901 the Bowlers moved to Denver and house was sold to Alfred Hillstrom and his family. Hillstrom descendents lived in the house until 1975, when it was purchased and restored by the Belle Plaine Historical Society.

== Museum ==
The property is owned by the city of Belle Plaine and stands in Court Square Park. The Belle Plaine Historic Society maintains the museum. Rooms of the house are furnished to depict three periods: the 1850s and 1860s, Victorian, and early 20th century. Local history items are on display in the carriage house. Visitors may see the distinctive outhouse, but may not use it.

== See also ==
- National Register of Historic Places listings in Scott County, Minnesota
