= Episcopal Church of the Transfiguration (Belle Plaine, Minnesota) =

Historic church in Minnesota, United States

- U.S. National Register of Historic Places
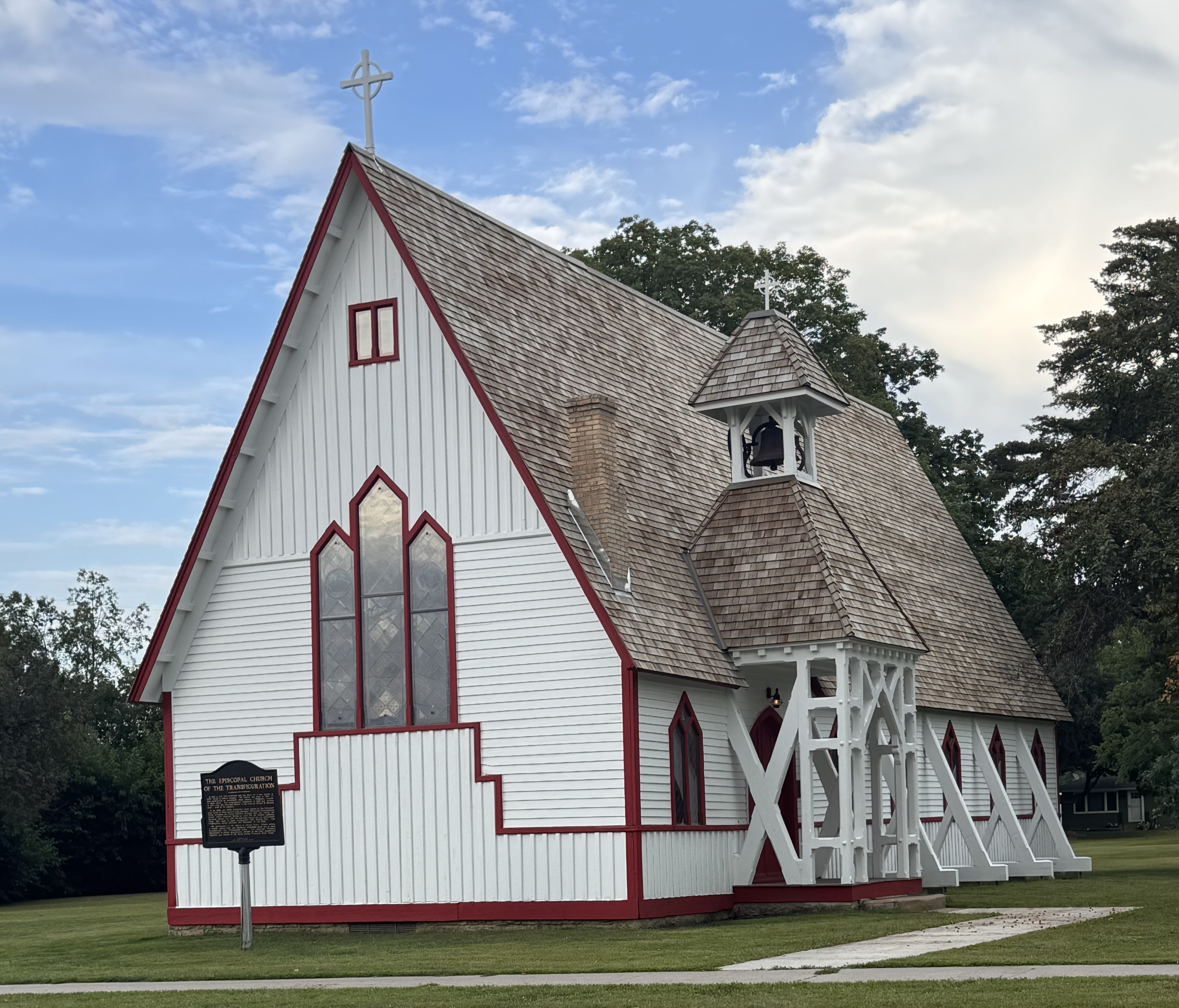
- The Episcopal Church of the Transfiguration from the southwest

- Location within Minnesota Location within the United States
- Location: 201 N. Walnut Street, Belle Plaine, Minnesota
- Coordinates: 44°37′28.3″N 93°45′48.5″W
- Area: 2 acres (0.81 ha)
- Built: 1868
- Architectural style: Stick style
- MPS: Scott County MRA
- NRHP reference No.: 80002159
- Added to NRHP: April 17, 1980

The Episcopal Church of the Transfiguration is a former church building in Belle Plaine, Minnesota, United States. It was built in 1868 in Stick style, a significant departure from the architecture of most contemporaneous churches in Minnesota. The property was listed on the National Register of Historic Places in 1980 for its significance in the theme of architecture. It was nominated for its unusual use of Stick style. It housed a congregation of the Episcopal Diocese of Minnesota.

== Description ==
The Episcopal Church of the Transfiguration is a small wooden building with an essentially rectangular footprint. It has a steeply pitched gable roof and buttresses following this same angle. The church has triple lancet windows at the gable ends and pointed windows on the longer sides. There is board and batten around the lower parts of the walls and at the peaks of the gables. Between is clapboard siding.

The main entry is on the south elevation, offset to the west. It is surmounted by a small tower with open stickwork and a small belfry.

The small cemetery is behind the church on the east. The church stands alone on a city block, which is now Founders Memorial Park.

== History ==
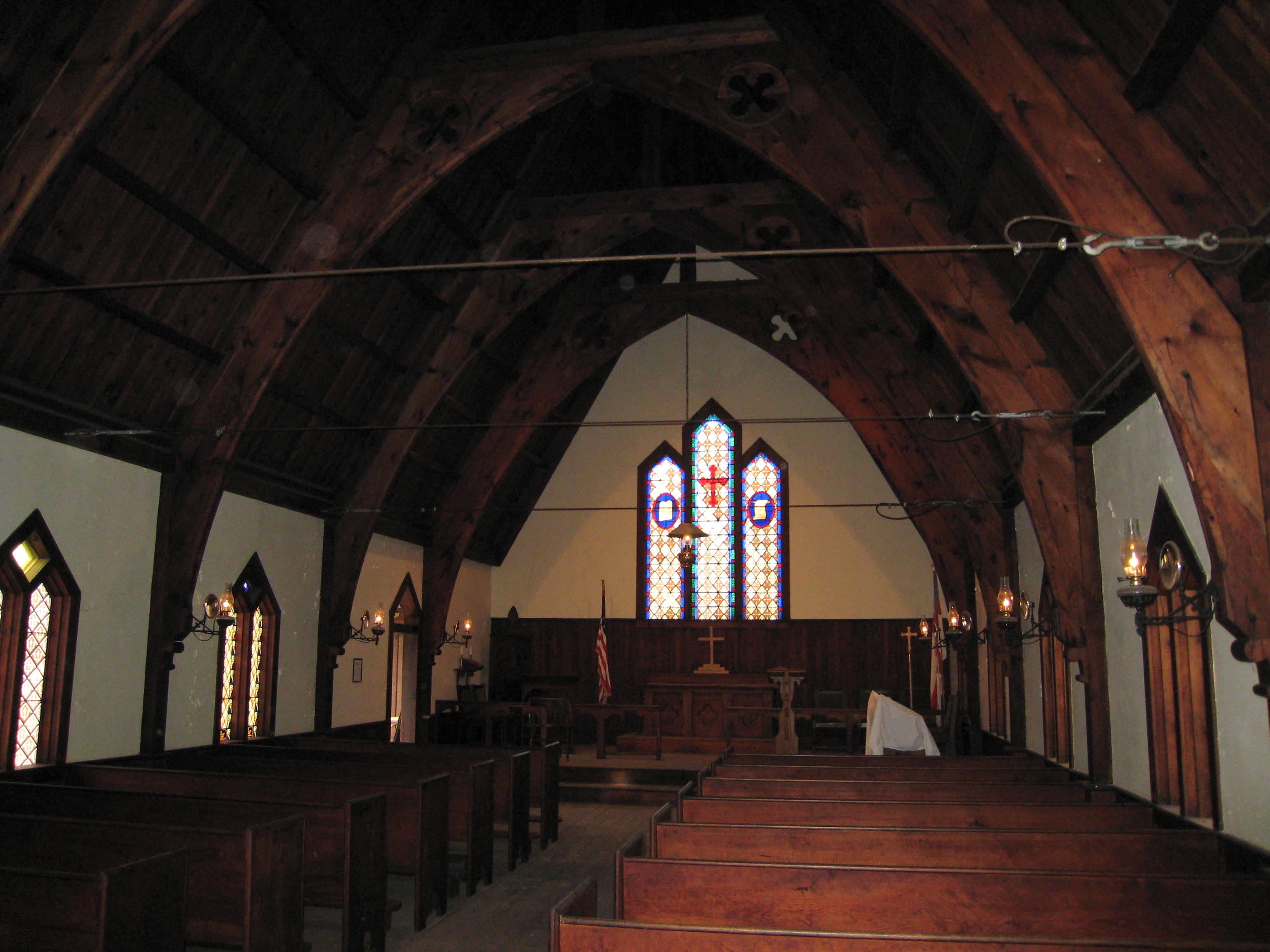
The church interior in 2009

The Episcopal congregation was founded in 1858. Belle Plaine's founder Andrew G. Chatfield donated the land for a church. An architect in New York City sent the plans to Minnesota's Bishop Henry Benjamin Whipple in 1867. The cost of construction was $3,500 (equivalent to $84,656 in 2025). The design is a departure from the other frame churches being built in Scott County, Minnesota, at the time. It also differs from Minnesota's other late-19th-century Episcopal churches, which usually used Gothic Revival architecture based on Richard Upjohn's designs. The plan nevertheless emphasized tradition in the newly forming communities of the Minnesota River Valley.

The population growth of the Minnesota River Valley in the 1860s and 1870s was largely driven by Lutheran and Roman Catholic immigrants from Germany, Ireland, and Czechoslovakia. These groups formed their own ethnic congregations, leaving Belle Plaine's Episcopal congregation small. Membership peaked in 1871 with 16 families. The dwindling congregation merged with a church in St. Peter, Minnesota, in the 1950s and abandoned this building. The property was bought by the city of Belle Plaine and is maintained by the Scott County Historical Society.

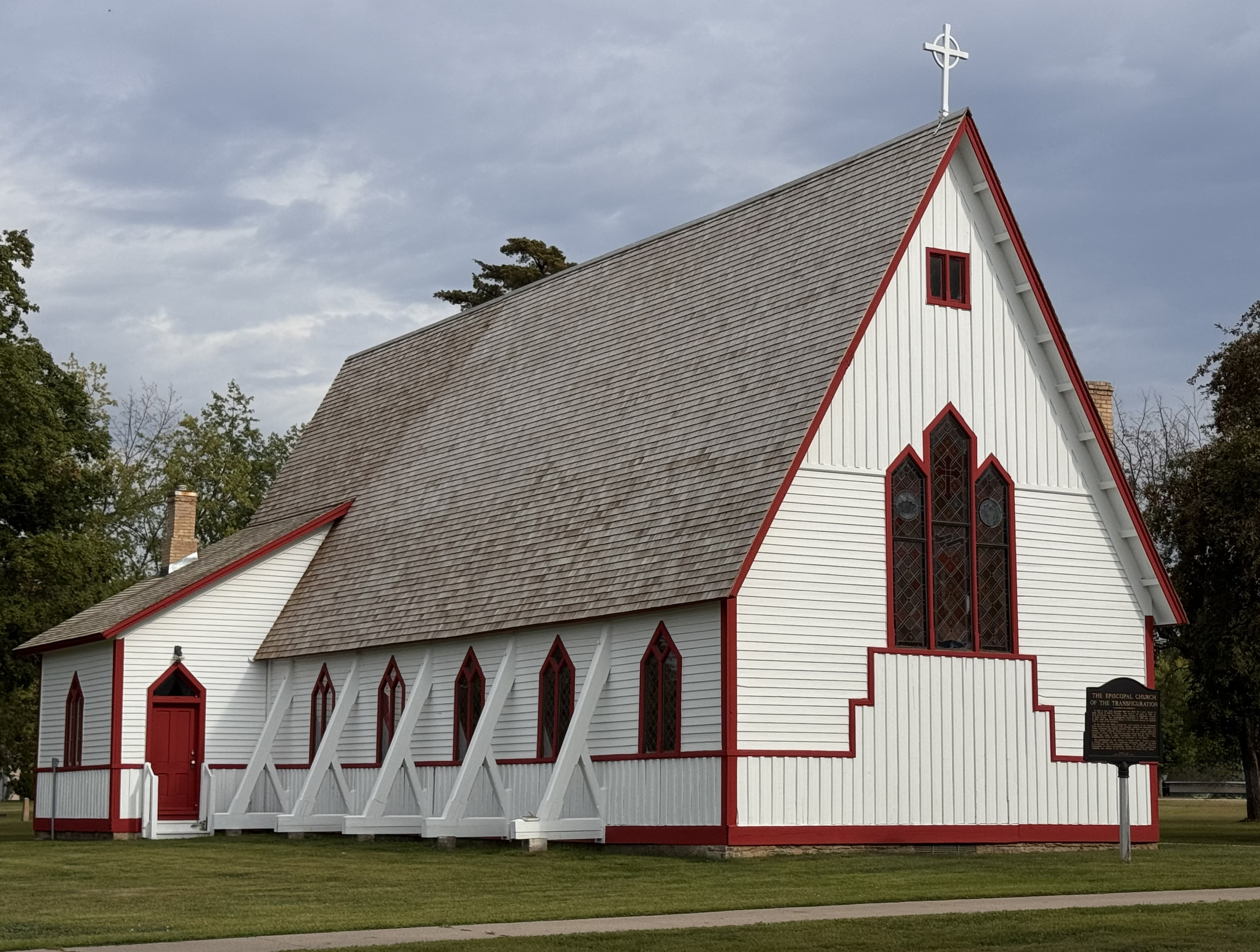
The church in 2026

The historical society received Minnesota Historical and Cultural Heritage Grants in 2010 to fix foundation and structural issues and in 2023 to repair the stained glass windows, plaster, and paint, and to install heating, ventilation, and air conditioning to help preserve the building materials.

== See also ==
- List of Episcopal churches
- National Register of Historic Places listings in Scott County, Minnesota
