= Strunk–Nyssen House =

Historic house in Minnesota, United States

- U.S. National Register of Historic Places
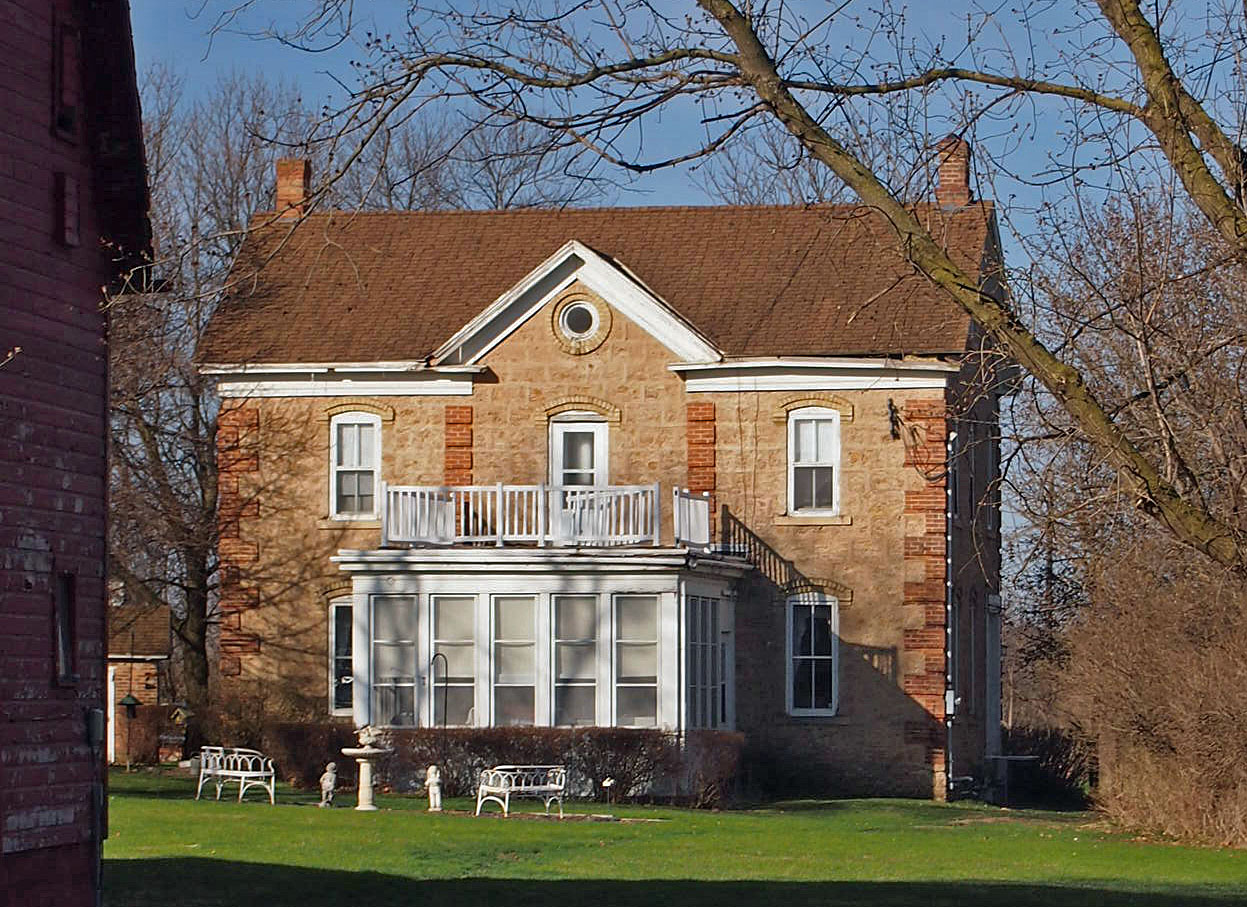
- The Strunk–Nyssen House from the northeast

- Location within Minnesota Location within the United States
- Location: 11120 Chaparral Avenue, Jackson Township, Minnesota
- Coordinates: 44°47′19.5″N 93°33′25.5″W
- Area: Less than one acre
- Built: c. 1856, c. 1880
- Architectural style: Vernacular architecture
- MPS: Scott County MRA
- NRHP reference No.: 80002174
- Added to NRHP: April 17, 1980

The Strunk–Nyssen House is a historic property in Jackson Township, Minnesota, United States, just outside the city of Shakopee. The original wing of the house was built around 1856 for Herman H. Strunk, who established the area's first brewery on the site. The brewery went by several names over the course of its existence, but is commonly referred to as the Shakopee Brewery. The residence was enlarged around 1880 by Hubert and Mary Nyssen, who used the second floor as a boarding house. The Nyssens continued operating the brewery until 1920.

The property was listed on the National Register of Historic Places in 1980 for its significance in the themes of architecture, commerce, exploration/settlement, and industry. It was nominated for its long association with the important brewing industry of early Scott County and as an example of 19th-century vernacular architecture.

== Description ==
The Strunk–Nyssen House is located a short distance south of the Minnesota River, in what is now an industrial area on the west edge of Shakopee. The house was built in two sections. The older west section is a simple two-story brick building. The larger east section is built of mortared ashlars with brick quoins, with its main entrance facing north. The two-over-two windows are tall with shallow arches. The gable roof has a brick chimney at either end. A wall dormer with an oculus is centered on the east façade. This face originally had a porch and staircase providing exterior access to the second-story boarding house, which has four small rooms off a central hallway. That porch was replaced shortly before 1980 and a two-car garage was added to the west end of the house.

The ruins of the brewery, separated from the house by railroad tracks, are still visible from the Minnesota Valley State Trail. Also on the property are a wood-frame barn and a brick smokehouse.

== History ==
German immigrant Herman H. Strunk homesteaded the site in 1855. The following year he opened the first brewery in the Minnesota River Valley, adjacent to the original section of the house where he and his family lived. Strunk was soon operating a distillery, a hunting lodge, and a drug store, and sold off this property in 1860. Andrew and Mary Winkler took over the business in 1863. Andrew Winkler died in 1870 and Mary ran the brewery herself for five years before marrying Hubert Nyssen, an experienced German brewer.

The Nyssens had the house enlarged around 1880. They lived on the first floor and used the second floor as a boarding house for the farmers and salesmen who came great distances to deliver barley or brewing supplies. The Nyssens grew some of their own barley and kept livestock on an adjacent 80-acre (32 ha) farm. On October 28, 1897, the brewery was badly damaged in a fire. A $3,925 insurance settlement funded enough repairs to stay in business. The Shakopee Brewery remained a prominent local business until the passage of Prohibition in 1920 led to its closure. Hubert Nyssen continued to live in the house until his death in 1930.

== See also ==
- National Register of Historic Places listings in Scott County, Minnesota
