= New Market Township, Scott County, Minnesota =

New Market Township, Minnesota
- Township
- Location within the state of Minnesota New Market Township, Minnesota (the United States)
- Coordinates: 44°35′2″N 93°19′42″W
- Country: United States
- State: Minnesota
- County: Scott

Area
  - Total: 33.8 sq mi (87.6 km^{2})
  - Land: 33.8 sq mi (87.5 km^{2})
  - Water: 0.077 sq mi (0.2 km^{2})
- Elevation: 1,073 ft (327 m)

Population (2020)
  - Total: 3,525
- Time zone: UTC-6 (Central (CST))
  - Summer (DST): UTC-5 (CDT)
- ZIP code: 55054
- Area code: 952
- FIPS code: 27-45754
- GNIS feature ID: 0665104
- Website: https://newmarkettownship.org/

New Market Township is a township in Scott County, Minnesota, United States. The population was 3,525 at the 2020 census.

== History ==
New Market Township was originally called Jackson Township, and under the latter name was organized in 1858. A few months later, the name was changed to New Market.

== Geography ==
According to the United States Census Bureau, the township has a total area of 33.8 square miles (87.6 km^{2}), of which 33.8 square miles (87.5 km^{2}) is land and 0.1 square mile (0.2 km^{2}) (0.21%) is water. The Credit River flows northwardly through the township.

== Demographics ==
As of the census of 2000, there were 3,057 people, 956 households, and 834 families residing in the township. The population density was 90.5 inhabitants per square mile (34.9/km^{2}). There were 976 housing units at an average density of 28.9 per square mile (11.2/km^{2}). The racial makeup of the township was 98.23% White, 0.20% African American, 0.23% Native American, 0.23% Asian, 0.03% Pacific Islander, 0.49% from other races, and 0.59% from two or more races. Hispanic or Latino of any race were 1.08% of the population.

There were 956 households, out of which 48.1% had children under the age of 18 living with them, 81.0% were married couples living together, 3.5% had a female householder with no husband present, and 12.7% were non-families. 8.2% of all households were made up of individuals, and 2.2% had someone living alone who was 65 years of age or older. The average household size was 3.20 and the average family size was 3.39.

In the township the population was spread out, with 33.2% under the age of 18, 5.0% from 18 to 24, 33.4% from 25 to 44, 24.4% from 45 to 64, and 4.0% who were 65 years of age or older. The median age was 36 years. For every 100 females, there were 109.7 males. For every 100 females age 18 and over, there were 102.3 males.

The median income for a household in the township was $82,718, and the median income for a family was $85,880. Males had a median income of $50,811 versus $32,639 for females. The per capita income for the township was $31,176. About 0.6% of families and 2.3% of the population were below the poverty line, including 1.4% of those under age 18 and 5.7% of those age 65 or over.
