= Jordan Historic District =

Historic district in Minnesota, United States

- U.S. National Register of Historic Places
- U.S. Historic district
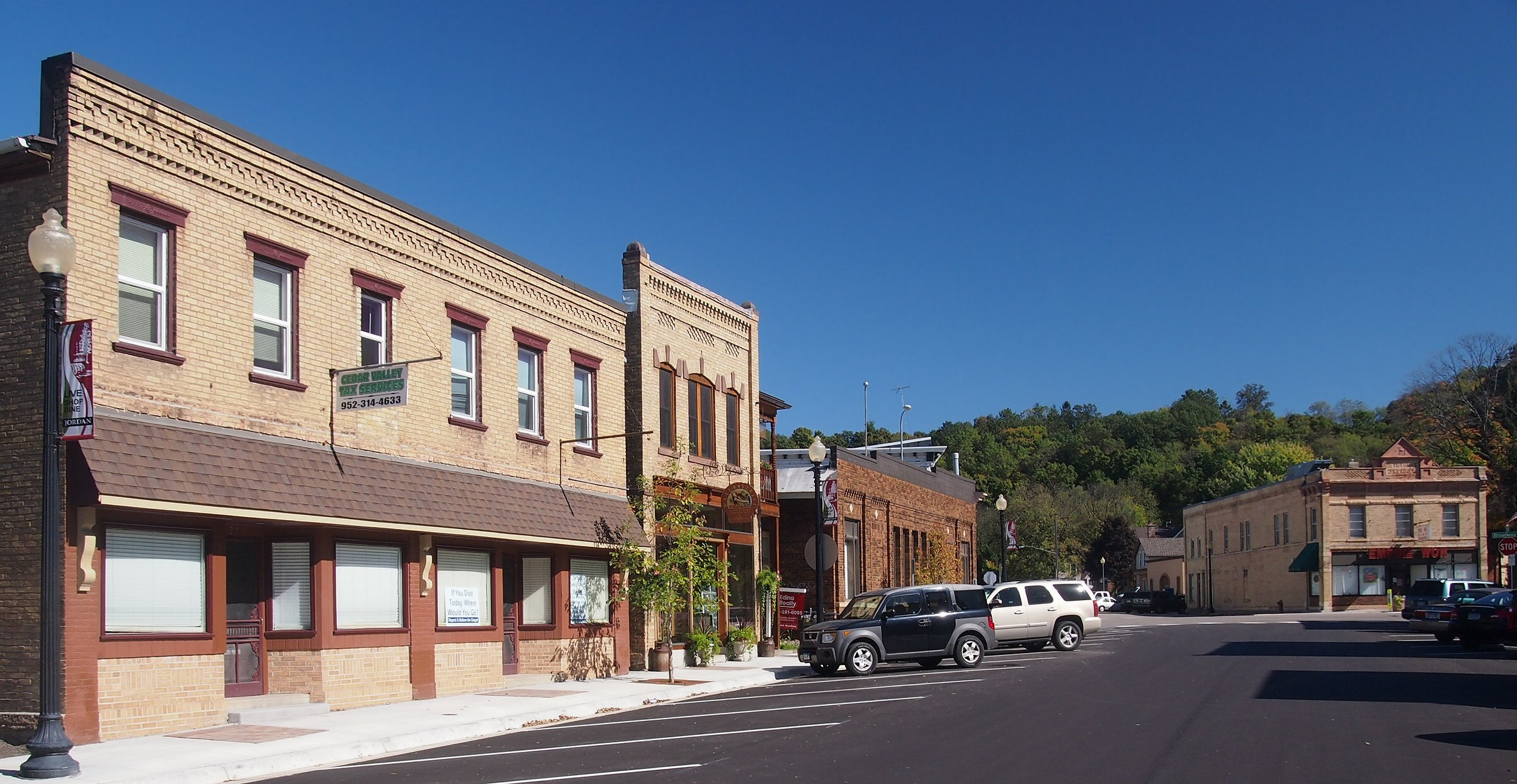
- View looking east down Water Street

- Location within Minnesota Location within the United States
- Location: Water Street and Broadway Street S., Jordan, Minnesota
- Coordinates: 44°39′55″N 93°37′34″W
- Area: 4 acres (1.6 ha)
- Built: 1860–1917
- MPS: Scott County MRA
- NRHP reference No.: 80002163
- Added to NRHP: April 17, 1980

The Jordan Historic District is a historic business district in Jordan, Minnesota, United States. It consists of 14 contributing properties mostly built between 1865 and 1880. The district was listed on the National Register of Historic Places in 1980 for its significance in the themes of architecture and commerce. It was nominated for being the best-preserved 19th-century business district in Scott County, Minnesota, and the commercial core of an important city in the county's early history.

== Description ==
The Jordan Historic District comprises 16 buildings—12 named as pivotal to the district in its National Register nomination, two contributing, and two intrusive due to their later date. The buildings are situated at all four corners of the intersection of Broadway and Water Street, and along both sides of Water Street for most of a block to the west. Many are constructed of local brick which is of a light buff color. Proportions are modest, decoration simple, and few codified architectural styles are present.

== History ==
Between 1865 and 1880 two railroads were built through Jordan, boosting an economy already served by good transportation access on the Minnesota River. Jordan seemed poised to challenge Shakopee for county seat status, but growth leveled off before the end of the century. The downtown buildings constructed during those peak years remained sufficient for the needs of the community, and there was little pressure to replace them or fill the vacant spaces around them. Thus the district looks much as it did at the turn of the 20th century. District buildings originally housed a bakery, a hardware store, a harness shop, a millinery, a pharmacy, a post office, and an opera house.

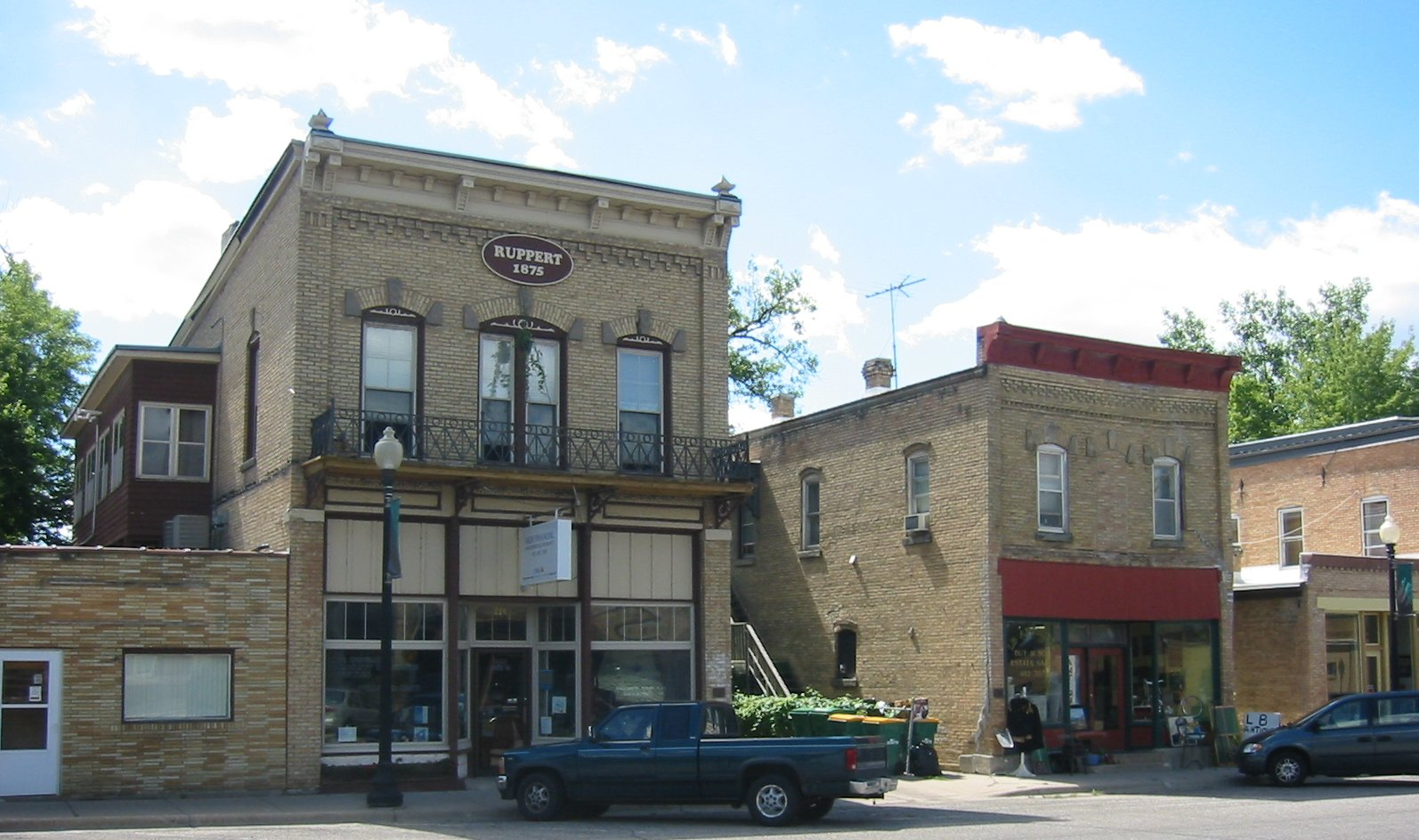
Ruppert's Bar and printing shop (both circa 1875)

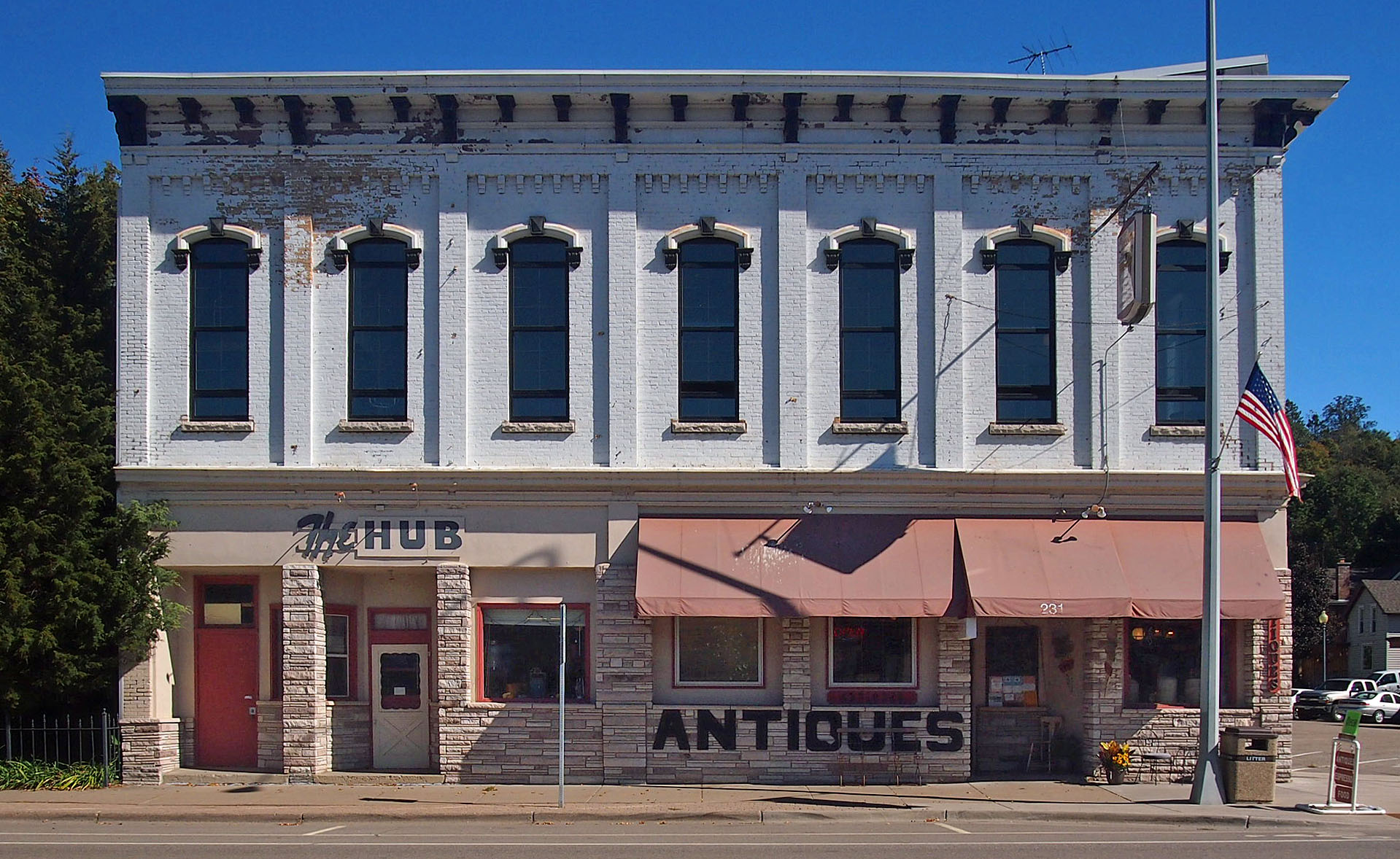
1876 Nicolin Opera House

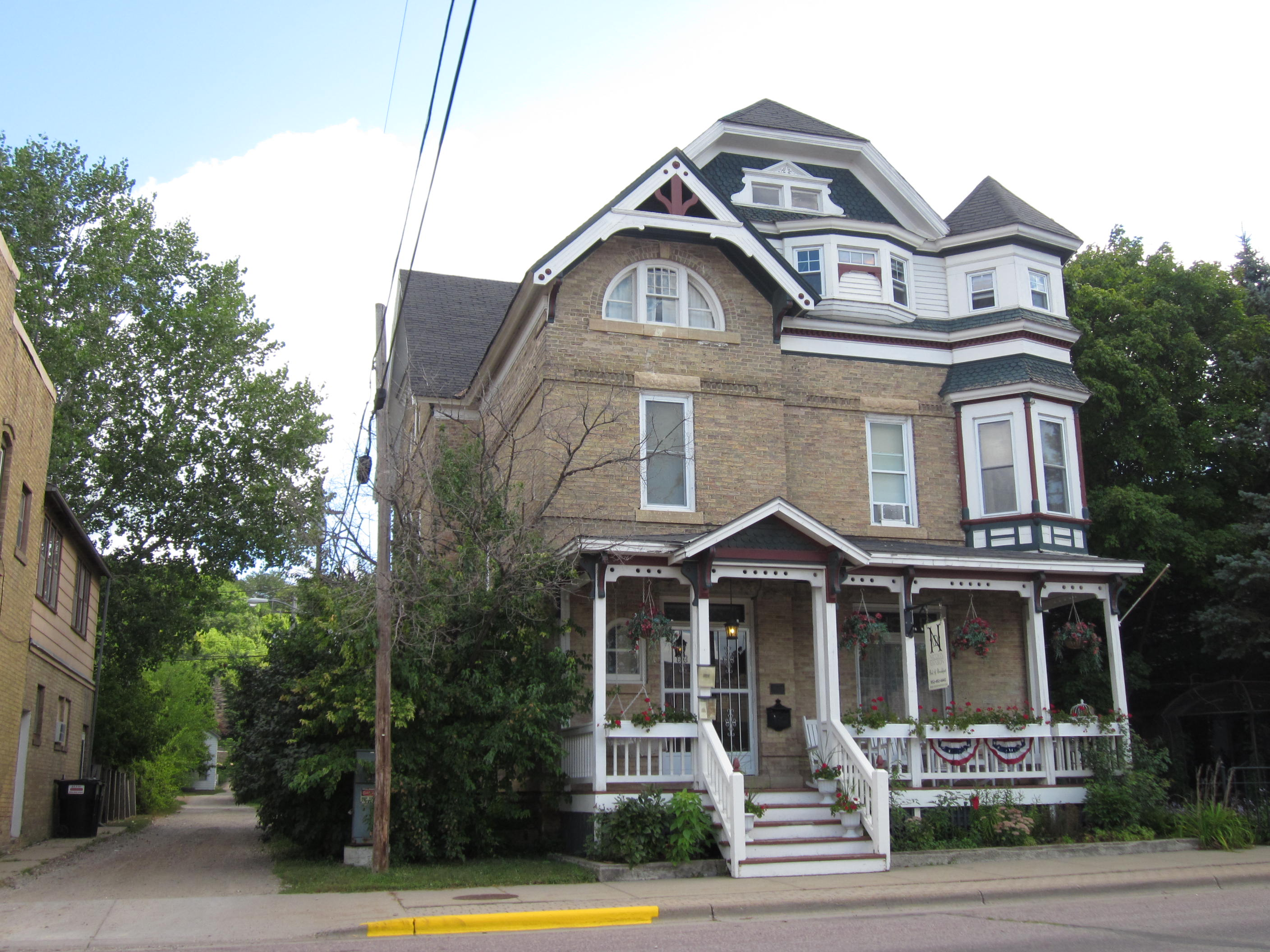
1888 Nicolin Mansion

== See also ==
- National Register of Historic Places listings in Scott County, Minnesota
