= Elko New Market, Minnesota =

City in Minnesota, United States

Elko New Market
- City
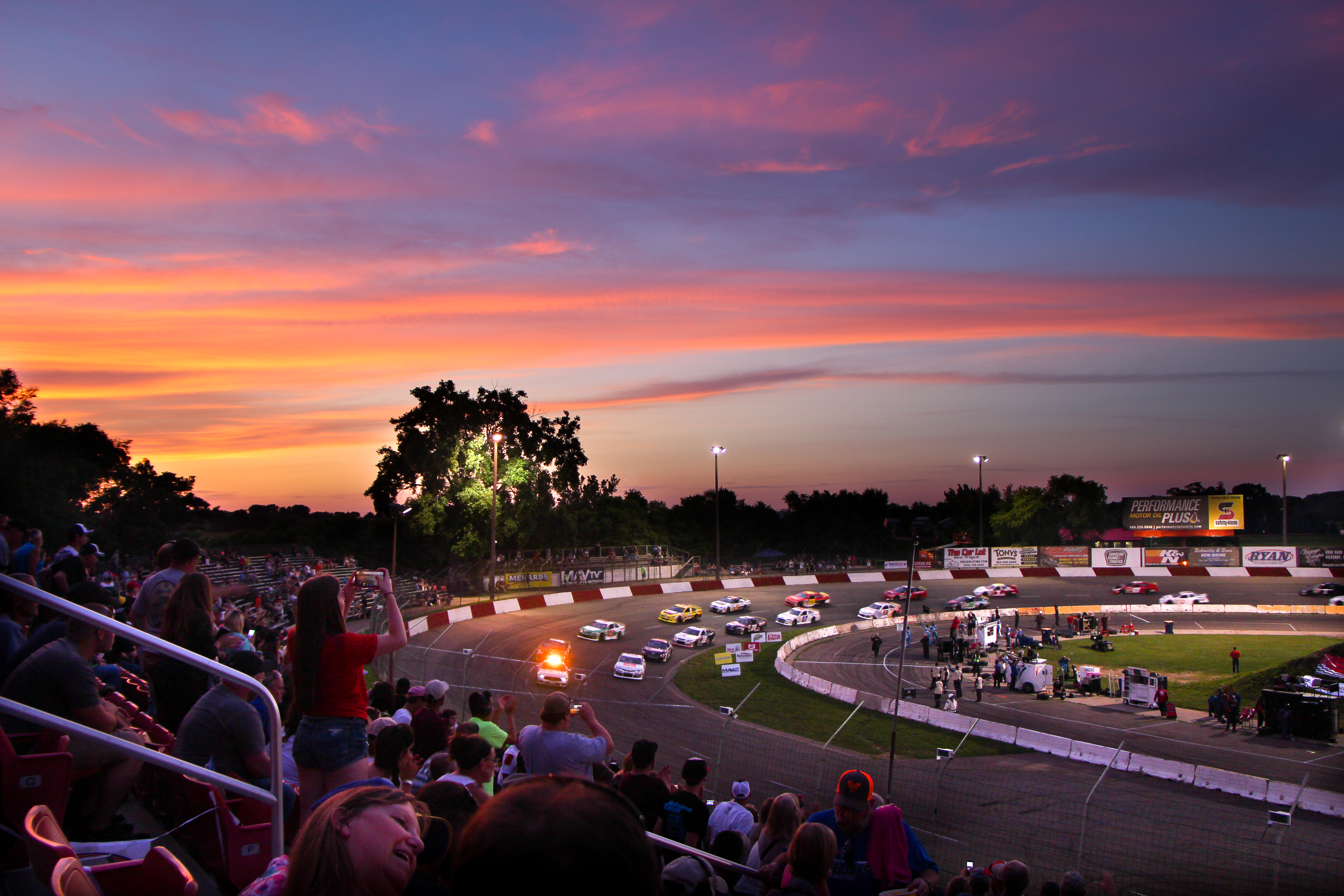
- Elko SpeedWay

- Coordinates: 44°34′00″N 93°20′15″W
- Country: United States
- State: Minnesota
- County: Scott
- Founded: 1856 (NM)
- Established: 1858 (NM)
- Merged: 2006

Government
  - Type: Mayor-council government - Executive form
  - Mayor: Joe Julius
  - City Manager: Thomas Terry

Area
  - City: 3.49 sq mi (9.03 km^{2})
  - Land: 3.49 sq mi (9.03 km^{2})
  - Water: 0 sq mi (0.00 km^{2})
- Elevation: 1,129 ft (344 m)

Population (2020)
  - City: 4,846
  - Estimate (2024): 5,200
  - Density: 1,389.5/sq mi (536.48/km^{2})
  - Metro: 3,690,512
- Time zone: UTC-6 (Central)
  - Summer (DST): UTC-5 (CDT)
- ZIP codes: 55054, 55020
- Area code: 952
- FIPS code: 27-18662
- GNIS feature ID: 2394658
- Website: elkonewmarketmn.gov

Elko New Market is a city in Scott County, Minnesota, United States. It was founded in 2006 through a merging of bordering cities Elko and New Market. The population was 4,846 at the 2020 census.

Served by Interstate 35 and Scott County Road 2, the city contains one public school, and is notable as the location of Elko Speedway. The New Market Hotel and Store is listed on the National Register of Historic Places. The city contains a marker for the Big Woods of south–central Minnesota.

== History ==
Elko was initially a railway village in 1858. New Market was named for the town near Cambridge, England, though it was first named Jackson until its establishment about the same time. Both Elko and New Market were common town names of the era according to the Minnesota Historical Society.

On March 21, 2006, both the cities of Elko and New Market passed a referendum to merge. The new city was named Elko New Market with the merger taking effect on January 1, 2007.

== Geography ==
Located midway between the cities of Minneapolis and Faribault along Interstate 35, Elko New Market is in the southern exurban belt of the Minneapolis – Saint Paul area.

According to the United States Census Bureau, the city has a total area of 3.36 square miles (8.70 km^{2}), all land.

=== Climate ===
The climate of Elko New Market is classified as warm-summer humid continental with features of a hot-summer humid continental (Köppen Dfa).

Climate data for Elko New Market (Lakeville weather station) - 2010-2020
Month	Jan	Feb	Mar	Apr	May	Jun	Jul	Aug	Sep	Oct	Nov	Dec	Year
Mean daily maximum °F (°C)	22.6 (−5.2)	26.4 (−3.1)	42.4 (5.8)	55.0 (12.8)	68.7 (20.4)	78.3 (25.7)	82.8 (28.2)	80.4 (26.9)	72.1 (22.3)	57.2 (14.0)	41.9 (5.5)	27.1 (−2.7)	54.5 (12.5)
Daily mean °F (°C)	16.5 (−8.6)	19.4 (−7.0)	34.9 (1.6)	46.2 (7.9)	59.2 (15.1)	68.9 (20.5)	73.2 (22.9)	70.9 (21.6)	63.5 (17.5)	49.6 (9.8)	36.1 (2.3)	22.5 (−5.3)	46.7 (8.2)
Mean daily minimum °F (°C)	8.6 (−13.0)	10.4 (−12.0)	26.8 (−2.9)	37.4 (3.0)	49.5 (9.7)	59.9 (15.5)	63.9 (17.7)	61.3 (16.3)	55.2 (12.9)	41.9 (5.5)	29.5 (−1.4)	18.1 (−7.7)	38.8 (3.8)
Average rainfall inches (mm)	0.8 (20)	0.7 (18)	1.8 (45)	2.5 (64)	3.5 (89)	4.1 (105)	4.1 (105)	4.0 (102)	3.1 (80)	2.2 (56)	1.5 (37)	0.9 (24)	29.3 (745)
Source: weather-online

== Demographics ==
Historical population
Census	Pop.	Note	%±
2000	3,972		—
2010	4,110		3.5%
2020	4,846		17.9%
2022 (est.)	5,024		3.7%
U.S. Decennial Census; 2020 Census

=== 2020 census ===
As of the 2020 census, Elko New Market had a population of 4,846. The median age was 34.4 years. 33.0% of residents were under the age of 18 and 6.6% of residents were 65 years of age or older. For every 100 females there were 101.9 males, and for every 100 females age 18 and over there were 102.4 males age 18 and over.

0.0% of residents lived in urban areas, while 100.0% lived in rural areas.

There were 1,538 households in Elko New Market, of which 53.8% had children under the age of 18 living in them. Of all households, 69.8% were married-couple households, 12.2% were households with a male householder and no spouse or partner present, and 11.4% were households with a female householder and no spouse or partner present. About 12.2% of all households were made up of individuals and 4.0% had someone living alone who was 65 years of age or older.

There were 1,559 housing units, of which 1.3% were vacant. The homeowner vacancy rate was 0.6% and the rental vacancy rate was 1.5%.

Racial composition as of the 2020 census
Race	Number	Percent
White	4,291	88.5%
Black or African American	74	1.5%
American Indian and Alaska Native	6	0.1%
Asian	113	2.3%
Native Hawaiian and Other Pacific Islander	2	0.0%
Some other race	73	1.5%
Two or more races	287	5.9%
Hispanic or Latino (of any race)	196	4.0%

=== 2010 census ===
As of the census of 2010, there were 4,110 people, 1,259 households, and 1,064 families residing in the city. The population density was 1,223.2 inhabitants per square mile (472.3/km^{2}). There were 1,328 housing units at an average density of 395.2 per square mile (152.6/km^{2}). The racial makeup of the city was 92.5% White, 1.6% African American, 0.3% Native American, 3.1% Asian, 0.2% from other races, and 2.2% from two or more races. Hispanic or Latino of any race were 2.3% of the population.

There were 1,259 households, of which 60.4% had children under the age of 18 living with them, 73.9% were married couples living together, 6.3% had a female householder with no husband present, 4.3% had a male householder with no wife present, and 15.5% were non-families. 9.5% of all households were made up of individuals, and 0.9% had someone living alone who was 65 years of age or older. The average household size was 3.26 and the average family size was 3.53.

The median age in the city was 30.4 years. 38% of residents were under the age of 18; 4.6% were between the ages of 18 and 24; 39.5% were from 25 to 44; 15.1% were from 45 to 64; and 2.7% were 65 years of age or older. The gender makeup of the city was 50.9% male and 49.1% female.

== Sports ==
Elko New Market is home to the Elko Speedway, a 3/8 mile asphalt oval that hosts the ASA Midwest Tour and the ARCA Menards Series' Shore Lunch 250.

== Education ==
- Eagle View Elementary
