= Minnesota Valley =

Minnesota Valley may refer to:

== Organizations ==
- Minnesota Valley Canning Company, the former name of vegetable producer Green Giant
- Minnesota Valley Lutheran High School, a private education institution in New Ulm
- Minnesota Valley Wetland Management District, a local government conservation agency
- Minnesota Valley Transit Authority, a public agency in Minneapolis-St. Paul

== Places ==
- Minnesota valley, the geographic depression area of the Minnesota River in the United States
- Minnesota Valley National Wildlife Refuge, a federally protected area
- Minnesota Valley State Recreation Area, a unit of the Minnesota state park system
- Minnesota Valley State Trail, a multi-use recreation pathway
