= Coldwater Spring =

Historic site in Minnesota, U.S.

- Mní Ówe Sní
- IUCN category II (national park)
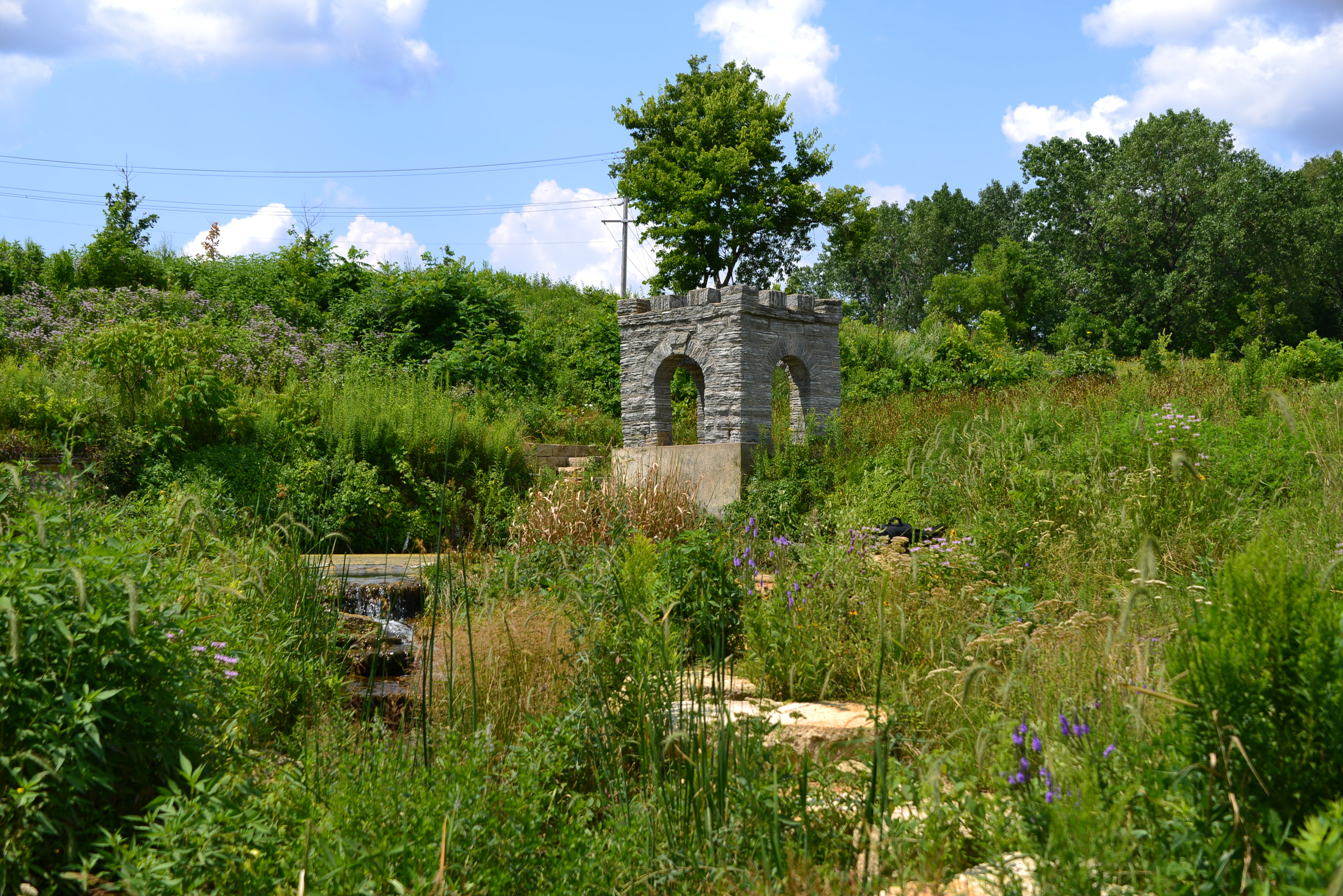
- Coldwater Spring in July 2014
- Location: Fort Snelling unorganized territory in the U.S. state of Minnesota
- Nearest city: Minneapolis
- Coordinates: 44°53.96′N 93°11.77′W
- Governing body: U.S. National Park Service
- Website: Coldwater Spring
- Mni Owe Sni - Coldwater Spring
- U.S. National Register of Historic Places
- Location within Minnesota
- Location: Address Restricted, St. Paul, Minnesota
- Area: 65.7 acres (26.6 ha)
- NRHP reference No.: 100009497
- Added to NRHP: November 3, 2023

Coldwater Spring (Dakota: Mní Ówe Sní) is a spring in the Fort Snelling unorganized territory of the U.S. state of Minnesota, that is considered a sacred site by the Dakota people, and was also the site of the U.S. Army's Camp Coldwater for troops that constructed Fort Snelling. Coldwater Spring is located on the west bluffs of the Mississippi River directly south of Minnehaha Park and adjacent to Fort Snelling State Park. Waters from the naturally occurring spring flow continuously year round and remain unfrozen in winter months. The spring and surrounding area is managed as a protected historic site and natural park by the National Park Service as part of the Mississippi National River and Recreation Area.

== History ==
=== First people ===
For thousands of years, Dakota people have considered the spring and area around it to be a place of spiritual importance. The confluence of the Mississippi and Minnesota rivers was a neutral and sacred place where the Ojibwe, Dakota, Sauk, Meskwaki and Potowatamie tribes moved freely.

=== Camp Coldwater ===
The spring area was explored by early European-American settlers who were interested in expanding the fur trade. In September 1805, the area was part of a 100,000-acre (400 km^{2}) land purchased from the Mdewakanton Sioux Indians by Zebulon Pike. The land was designated as a military reservation.

On May 5, 1820, Lieutenant Colonel Henry Leavenworth moved his troops to the spring area because their former encampment, on the Minnesota River, was causing unhealthy conditions. Leavenworth was succeeded by Colonel Josiah Snelling in August of that year. The soldiers lived in tents and huts on the site during three summers while they built the permanent stone fort south of the location, which was completed in 1825 and named Fort Snelling. The spring continued to supply water to the fort, first via water wagons and then via a stone water tower and underground pipes.

Settlers who had left the Red River Colony settled near the spring location in 1821, but were forced to leave in 1840. They moved down the Mississippi River and settled in what eventually became Saint Paul, Minnesota. The Coldwater area once housed blacksmith shops, stables, trading posts, a hotel, and a steamboat landing, but nearly all of those buildings were gone by the time of the American Civil War.

With the re-opening of Fort Snelling during the Civil War, Coldwater Spring was once again used to supply water to the fort. In the 1880s, the Army built a formal waterworks at the site, including the extant springhouse and reservoir.

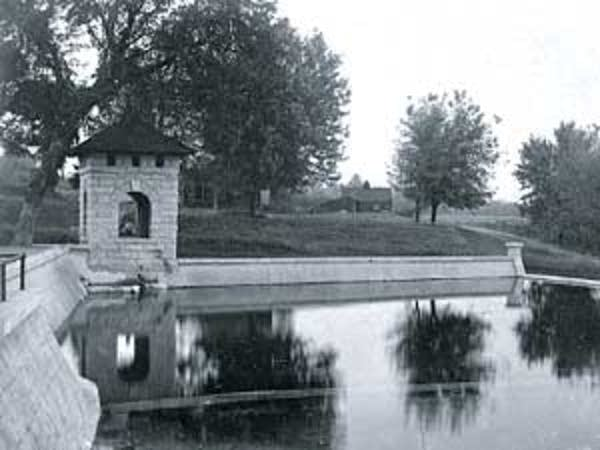
Coldwater Spring circa 1900

=== Mines research center ===
Following the closing of Fort Snelling after World War II, the site was turned over to the United States Bureau of Mines as their Twin Cities Research Center, where mining research was carried out for over 40 years. Several buildings were constructed in the 1960s for over 200 workers. Researchers at the site were credited with developing an air filtration system to eliminate black lung disease among coal miners, and creating a beeping device to alert people when a heavy truck is backing up. The Twin Cities Research Center closed in 1996 and several buildings were left abandoned.

=== Highway construction ===
For many years, efforts to protect the spring delayed planned freeway construction in the area. The Minnesota Department of Transportation set a national precedent in 2003 by welding 28,000 square yards of eight-layer synthetic liner, covering approximately six acres to protect the water flow to the spring. The liner isolated the interchange of Minnesota highways 55 and 62, allowing it to sit below the water table and remain dry, while also letting the water flow beneath the interchange to the spring.

=== Ownership transition ===
The National Park Service led an environmental impact statement process in 2006 to consider potential future uses of the site that had been largely abandoned for the past ten years. If disposing of the site, the federal government was required by law to sell the land to a state or local government, American Indian tribe, or an academic institution. Some of the vacant mine research buildings may have been eligible for National Register for Historic Places status, but would have required expensive repairs. Hennepin County officials wanted to convert the site to a suburban business park. Conservationists argued that the spring area should be repurposed as a publicly accessible natural park.

=== Coldwater Spring park ===
The property was transferred to the National Park Service in 2010, and made a unit of the Mississippi National River and Recreation Area. Plans to restore the native landscape led to discussion about Dakota history and ownership of the area. The community at the Lower Sioux Indian Reservation designated Coldwater as a traditional cultural property, making an official statement that the area "has been used for traditional, spiritual, religious and cultural ceremonies by the MN. Mdewakanton and their hereditary descendents for thousands of years" and that "the water of Coldwater Spring has been traditionally utilized for healing of Dakota people and others." The National Park Service held the view that while there were Dakota villages along the lower Minnesota River, there is little evidence the spring itself was a ceremonial site.

National Park Service crews at Coldwater Spring repaired the springhouse structure, restored the creek and wetlands, removed invasive species like buckthorn, and removed several abandoned buildings. The result was a savanna landscape said to resemble pre-settlement by European-American people. The National Park Service opened Coldwater Spring park to the public in 2012.

== Geology and hydrology ==
Coldwater Spring emanates from Platteville limestone bedrock near the river gorge that was formed over 10,000 years ago by glacier melt at the end of the most recent ice age. Water flows at 144,000 gallons per day at 47 °F (8 °C), remaining ice free in the winter with ducks present. Waters exit the spring into a reservoir before tumbling into a wetlands waterfall and eventually reaching the Mississippi River. Water from Coldwater Spring is not considered drinkable.

== Landscape ==
The site was extensively re-landscaped in 2012 with native grasses and wildflowers in an attempt to restore the original oak savanna landscape. Prairie restoration efforts had the similar aim as those at Bruce Vento Nature Sanctuary in Saint Paul a few years prior. Much of the restored landscape is maintained by NPS biological staff in partnership with biweekly volunteer crews.

== Recreation ==
The main features of Coldwater Spring park are walking paths through a tallgrass prairie, the naturally occurring spring, and the historic springhouse and reservoir. There is a .25-mile (0.40 km) crushed limestone path from the entrance that winds through the restored savanna to the historic springhouse structure. Beyond the springhouse, a 1-mile (1.6 km) hiking trail crosses the creek into the nearby woodlands and connects with the multi-use Minnehaha Trail, leading northward to Minnehaha Park or southward to Fort Snelling State Park. Bird watching and wildlife viewing are popular activities for visitors. The park has limited parking and there is no visitor center or restroom facility.

== Quotes ==
Early in the Spring [of 1820] Col. Leavenworth discovered the fountain of water where the troops now are, & to which they moved as soon as the ice would permit. It is a healthy situation, about 200 feet above the river, and the water gushing out of a lime stone rock is excellent. It is called "Camp Cold Water".

— James Duane Doty, Camp Cold Water, July 31, 1820

[It is] a situation which is extremely salubrious, and where they will remain until the permanent works [Fort St. Anthony, later Fort Snelling] are completed upon the bluff at the junction of the two rivers.

— Henry Schoolcraft, July 29, 1820

I was a little surprised on arriving here, to find that there is no such place as St. Peters proper. Fort Snelling, New Hope, and Camp Coldwater, comprise all the settlements here; and St. Peters seems to have been used, by common consent, as a name for the whole settlement around the mouth of the St. Peters river (Minnesota River), which empties into the Mississippi here, seven miles below the falls of St. Anthony.

— Benjamin T. Kavanaugh, November 5, 1839

In sight of Fort Snelling is a beautiful hill called Morgan’s Bluff: the Indians call it ‘Gods House. They have a tradition that it is the residence of their god of the waters, whom they call Unk-ta-he.

— Mary Henderson Eastman, page ii 1849.

== Gallery ==
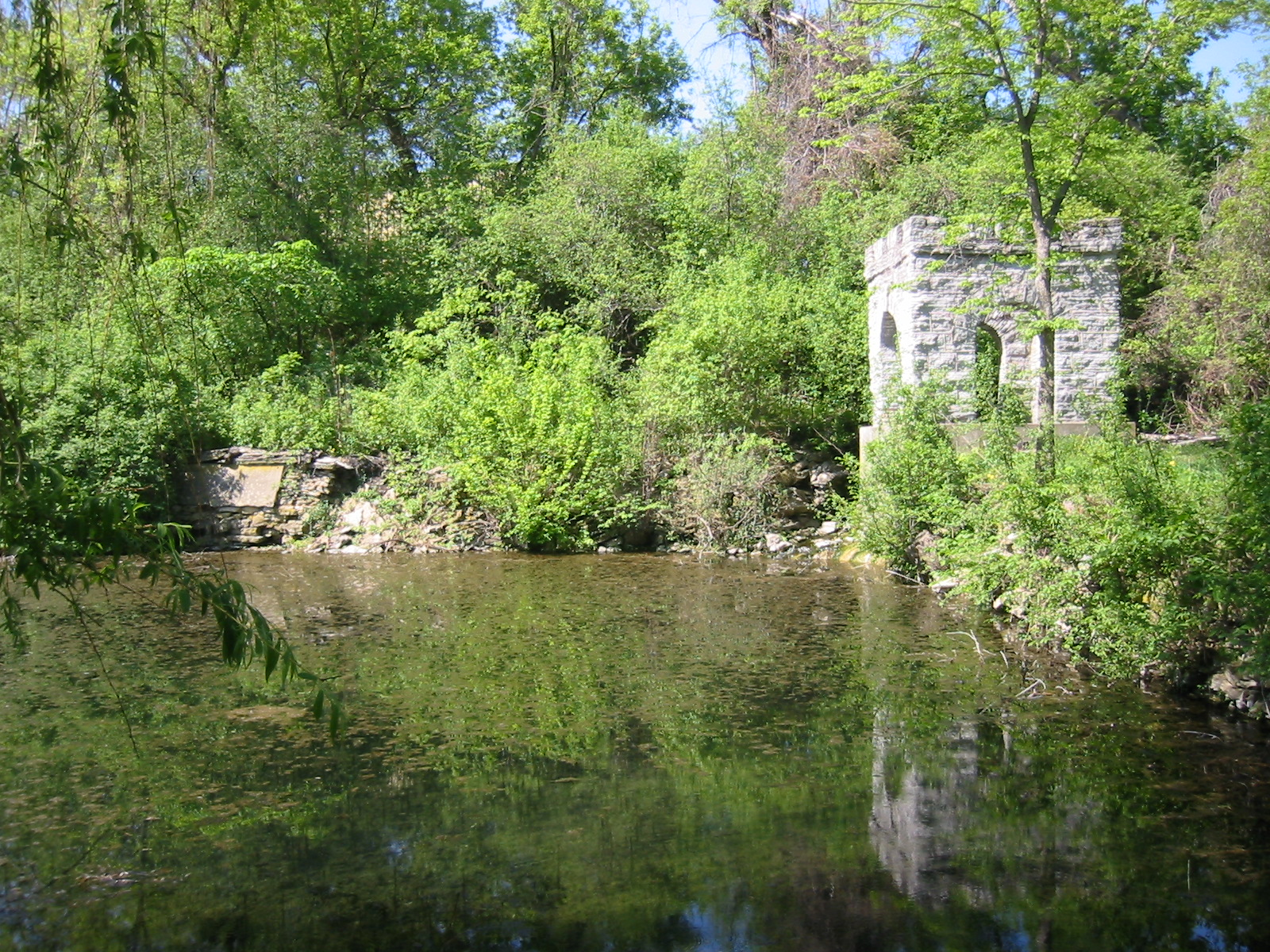
Springhouse and pond, May 2007

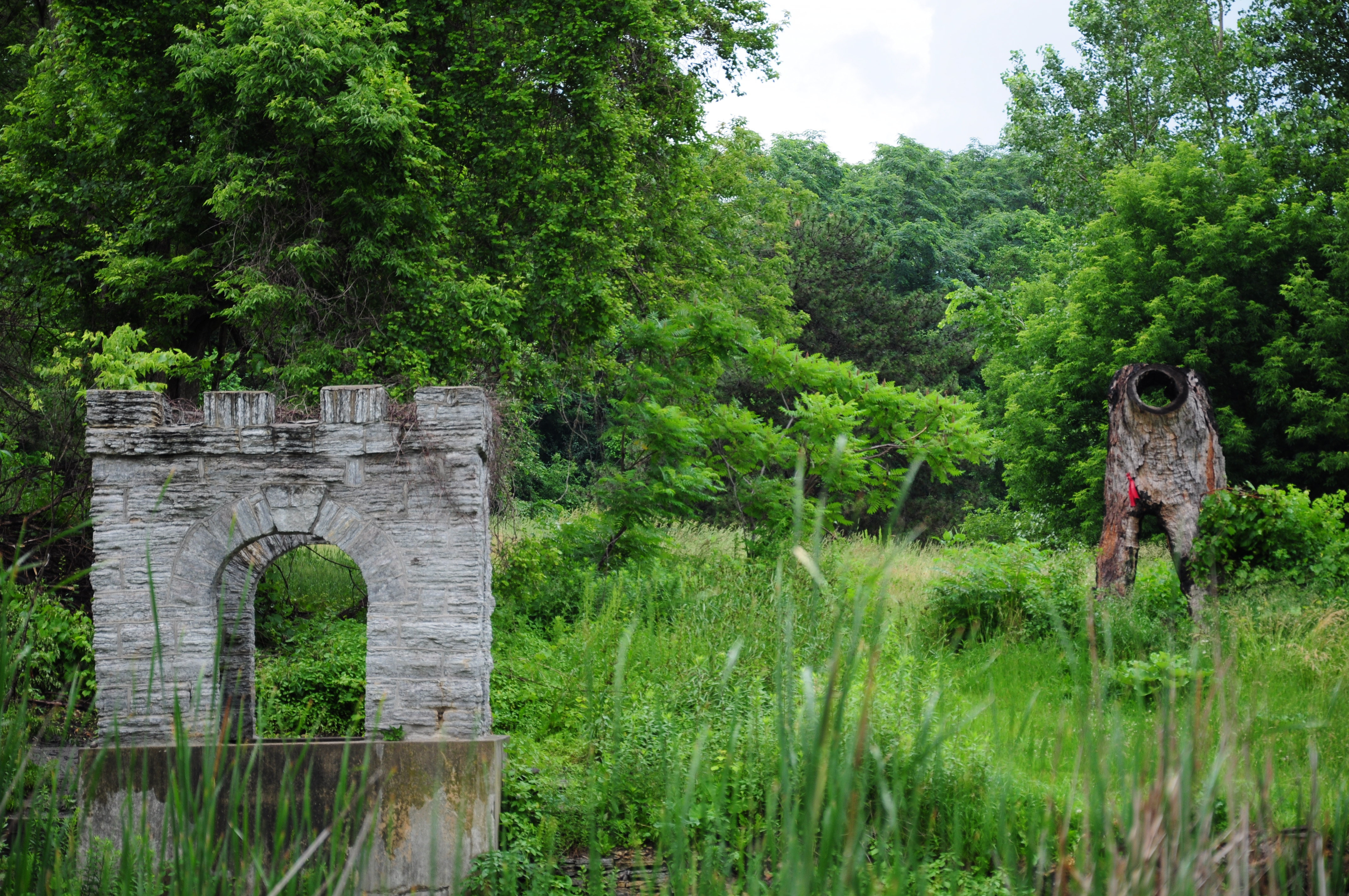
Springhouse and landscape in June 2010, before the National Park Service undertook re-landscaping on the property

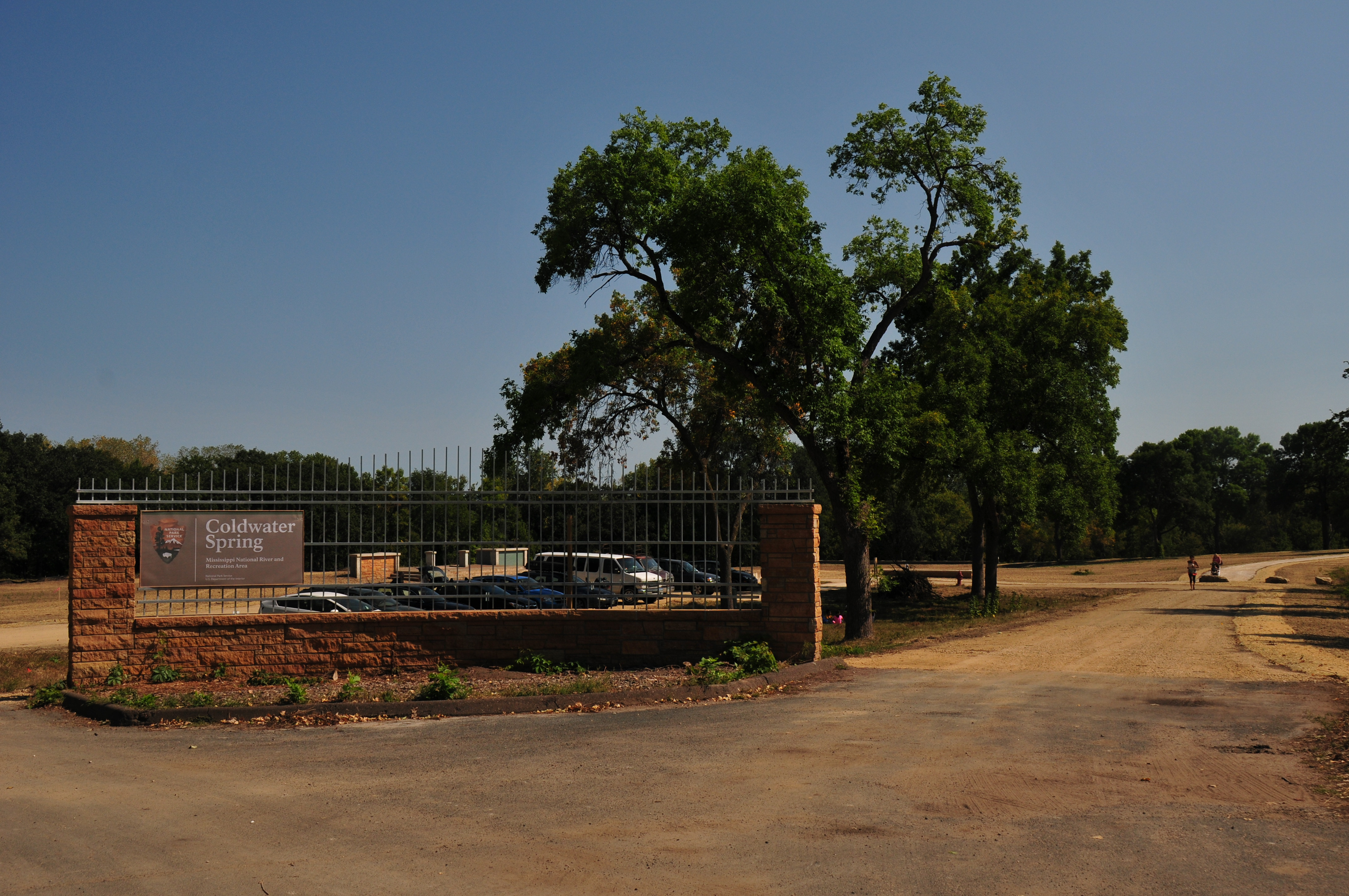
The entrance gate at Coldwater Spring on the day that the newly re-landscaped park opened to the public, September 2012

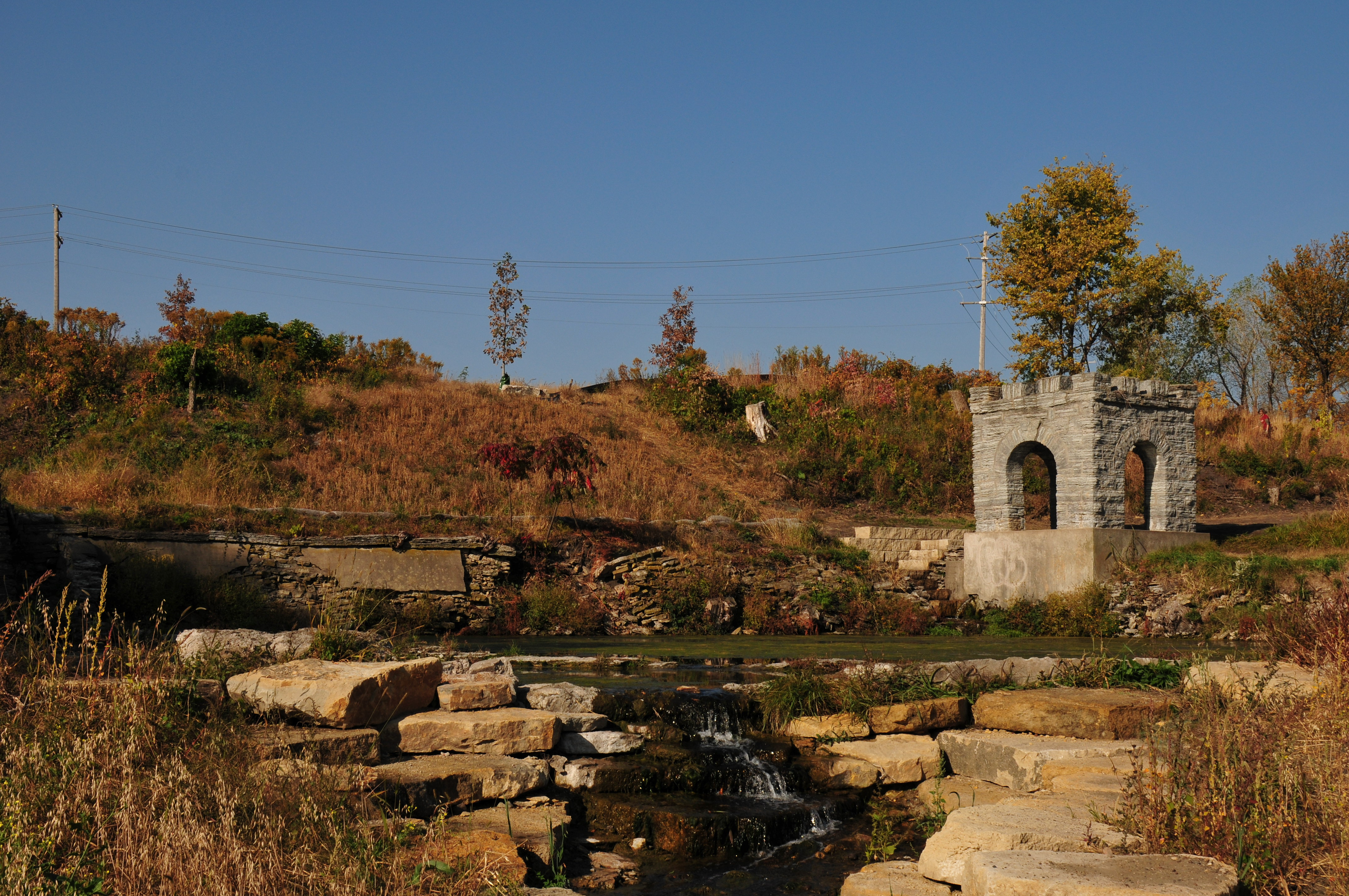
Coldwater Spring on the day that the newly re-landscaped park opened to the public, September 2012

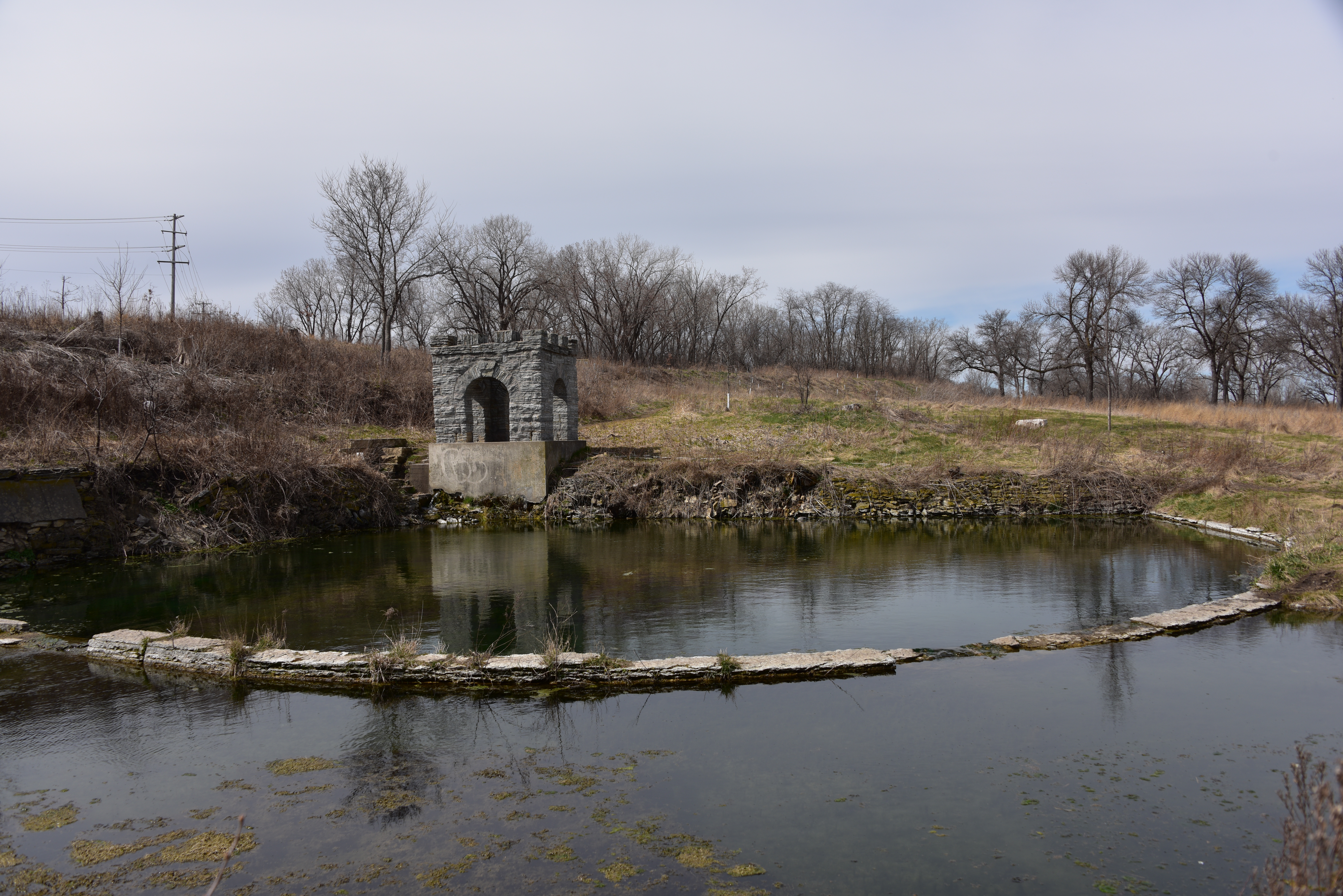
A spring house and a small reservoir mark the outlet of Coldwater Spring, April 2016
