= U. W. Hella =

American conservationist and Director of Minnesota State Parks

U. W. "Judge" Hella
- U.W. Hella, Director Minnesota State Parks
- Born: April 9, 1908; Cloquet, Minnesota
- Died: November 13, 1996 (aged 88); St. Paul, Minnesota
- Education: Bachelor of Science, Civil Engineering
- Occupation: Director of Minnesota State Parks
- Spouse: Viola Arneson
- Children: Lynne R. Polelle (1938 -); Jean A. Farrington (1942 - )
- Relatives: Roy Hella (brother); Rachel Hella (sister)

Udert William "Judge" Hella (1908–1996) was an American conservationist and Director of Minnesota State Parks from 1953 to 1973. He was responsible for acquiring large amounts of private property for use as national and state parks, and played a key role in establishing Voyageurs National Park, Fort Snelling State Park, and Charles A. Lindbergh State Park.

== Early life ==
U.W. Hella was the second of three children and born in Cloquet, Minnesota. His parents had immigrated from Finland and settled there with his father taking employment in a local paper mill. He attended elementary and high school in Cloquet (where he earned the nickname "Judge") and received a degree in Civil Engineering from the University of Minnesota. His older brother, Roy, received his degree at the University of Minnesota in Chemical Engineering and returned to Cloquet, eventually becoming general manager of the local mill. His younger sister, Rachel, died at the age of 12 from rheumatic fever.

== Early career ==
After receiving his degree in 1931, Hella searched for work and was initially hired by the Minnesota Highway Department for a year before being laid off. He considered working in the mill but was offered a job with the National Park Services as Civil Engineer Foreman as part of the Civilian Conservation Corps program.

== Minnesota State Parks ==
In 1937, the same year he was married to Viola (Vi) Arntson, he was transferred back to the State of Minnesota Parks system from the Omaha office of the National Park Service. He initially supervised the preparation of the Minnesota Park, Parkway and Recreational Plan. Between the time he spent in the Civilian Conservation Corps, the National Park Service, and work on the "Recreational Plan" he gained experience in managing parks and developed working relationships with the National Park Service. He was named director of Minnesota State Parks in 1953 and served in that capacity until 1973. One of his first initiatives was to form the Minnesota Council of State Parks with Minnesota Supreme Court justice Clarence R. Magney. During those years he earned the reputation as a respected state official and was certainly the most knowledgeable person on parks and recreational resources in the state. His opinion on such matters was highly regarded by legislators, NPS officials and prominent conservationists.

== Projects of note ==
=== Minnesota Council of State Parks ===
In 1954, shortly after becoming director, Hella worked with Judge Magney to form the council with the purpose of acquiring and protecting land for the state park system. Initially limited to 16 members, the council has since been renamed to the Minnesota Parks & Trails Council, has over 3,400 members, and has helped the park system grow from 88,000 acres to over 160,000 acres.

=== Voyageurs National Park ===
There had been ongoing efforts from as early as 1891 to create a national park in northern Minnesota. The efforts finally gained momentum with the creation of the Voyageurs National Park Association in 1965 which was founded by Hella as well as Sigurd Olson, and Governor Elmer L. Andersen. Later the group, working with the Minnesota Council of State Parks, helped organize citizen groups and associations to support the campaign. Congressional authorization of the park occurred in December 1970 and was signed by the president in January 1971, two years before Hella's retirement.

=== Fort Snelling State Park ===
Fort Snelling was original built at the confluence of the Mississippi and Minnesota rivers. In 1960 A. R. Nichols proposed a 2,400 acre park which gained the attention of Thomas C. Savage. Savage contacted Hella, who advised him to organize a citizen association dedicated to creation of the park. In 1961, the federal government, acting under the 1944 Surplus Property Act, deeded 320 acres to the state as a historic monument and the park was formed. Since then there have been continuous donations of funds and property helping the park to expand.

== See also ==
- List of Minnesota State Parks
- Voyageurs National Park
- Fort Snelling State Park
- Charles A. Lindbergh State Park

== Bibliography ==
- Hella, U. W. (August 10, 1993). "Mr. Hella's Experiences with the CCCs and Director of Minnesota State Parks". Itasca State Park Oral History Project (Interview). Interviewed by Amy K. Rieger. Minnesota Historical Society. Archived from the original on September 15, 2015.
- Meyer, Roy Willard. Everyone's Country Estate: A History of Minnesota's State Parks. Minnesota Historical Society Press, 1991. ISBN 0-87351-266-9
- Witzig, Fred T., "Eighty Years in the Making, A Legislative History of Voyageurs National Park". National Park Service Online Books, 2000.
