= Inyan Ceyaka Otonwe =

Historic place, former Dakota village in Minnesota, US

- U.S. National Register of Historic Places
- Location: Address restricted, Louisville Township, Minnesota
- Area: 13 acres (5.3 ha)
- NRHP reference No.: 99000191
- Designated: February 12, 1999

Inyan Ceyaka Otonwe ("Village at the Barrier of Stone"), also called Little Rapids or simply Inyan Ceyaka, was a summer planting village of the Wahpeton Dakota on the Minnesota River in what is now Louisville Township, Minnesota, United States. Located near present-day city of Jordan, the village was occupied by the Wahpeton during the early nineteenth century, and likely before. Burial mounds indicate that possible ancestors of the Dakota lived at the site as early as 100 CE. The site was listed on the National Register of Historic Places in 1999 for having local significance in the theme of archaeology. The unmarked site is preserved within the Carver Rapids unit of the Minnesota Valley State Recreation Area.

== Cultural history ==
During the fur-trade era (roughly 1750–1840), the size and location of Dakota encampments like the one at Inyan Ceyaka varied according to a yearly cycle. In fall, large groups dispersed to harvest maple sugar and hunt deer. In winter, smaller family groups established camps in wooded areas. Men hunted and trapped fur-bearing animals, while women retrieved food stores they had cached during the summer.

As a summer planting village, Inyan Ceyaka was occupied from late spring until early fall. It may also have been occupied in winter. The population of the village fluctuated, but Euro-American observers estimated that over three hundred Wahpeton lived there. Women planted, tended, and harvested corn at Inyan Ceyaka. Women and children gathered berries and roots. Men contributed to the food supply by hunting and fishing. Villagers also constructed bark containers, placed them underground, and used them to store excess corn.

Wahpeton women built and maintained the structures of the village. Since the Dakota built their largest wooden lodges at summer planting villages, it is likely that such lodges existed at Inyan Ceyaka. Designed for summer living, they provided shade and were well ventilated. Forty meters from the lodge area was a community dump where the villagers discarded plant and animal remains, ash, and other trash. An archaeological dig at the village site revealed an iron axe, an iron tomahawk, an arrow smoother made of sandstone, and a fish spear. Twenty-nine effigy mounds are located just south of the village site, although these predate the artifacts by several centuries.

Documentary and archaeological research suggests that the village included a dance area—a smooth, dry semi-circle surrounded by a low earthen embankment. The Wahpeton would have kept the interior of the circle clear for dancers to perform while spectators stood outside the embankment. Mazomani ("Walking Iron"), a spokesman of the Wahpeton in the early nineteenth century, was a well-known leader of the Medicine Lodge. His leadership of the lodge, coupled with archaeological evidence, suggests that medicine dances were held at Inyan Ceyaka during the summer.

== Post-contact history ==
The first known person of European descent to visit Inyan Ceyaka was Jean-Baptiste Faribault, though he may have been preceded by trader Archibald John Campbell. Faribault worked for the North West Company and began trading for furs at the village in 1802. He married a mixed-race Dakota woman and acted as a cultural middleman. Some historians believe he spent several summers at Inyan Ceyaka.

From Faribault's arrival until 1851, the village hosted fur traders. The Wahpeton exchanged furs for trade goods like beads, blankets, awls, and knives. A trading post may have been constructed just north of the village. Whether a physical post existed or not, the fur trade had a dramatic effect on the Wahpeton economy. European trade goods became a part of everyday life, presenting alternatives to traditionally manufactured items.

In the 1830s, the Wahpeton leaders Wanaksante ("Rebounding Iron") and Kinyan ("Red Eagle"), along with Mazomani, met with indian agent Lawrence Taliaferro. They expressed interest in practicing more intensive agriculture at the summer village site and asked for seeds, plows, and the construction of a corn mill. In 1843 missionaries Stephen and Mary Riggs visited the village and expressed their intention to establish a mission there. The Wahpeton leaders rejected their offer, not wanting any missionaries in the vicinity.

In 1851, Wahpeton leaders from Inyan Ceyaka attended the treaty negotiations at Traverse des Sioux. Mazomani's son (Mazomani II) signed the Treaty of Traverse des Sioux that ceded the land on which the village site was located. In the summer of 1853, the inhabitants of the village moved to a Dakota reservation on the Minnesota River.

The Dakota War of 1862 fragmented Dakota society, and Mazomani II was killed in the fighting. Many of the Wahpeton from Inyan Ceyaka were removed from the state or traveled west. In the 1880s some Wahpeton originally from the village began returning to Minnesota.

== See also ==
- National Register of Historic Places listings in Scott County, Minnesota
