= Minnesota Valley State Trail =

Multi-use recreation pathway along the Minnesota River

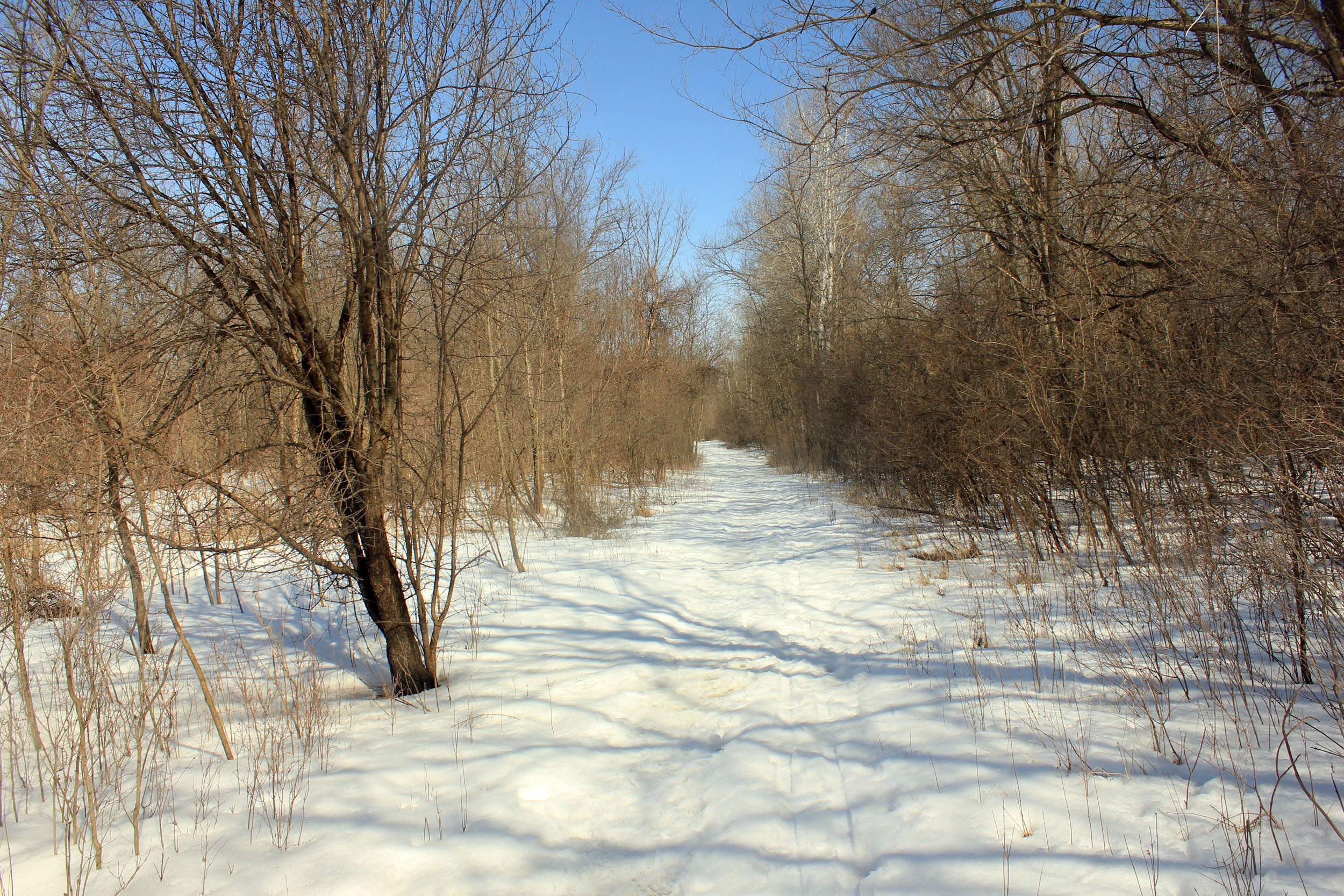
- The mixed-use path in winter.
- Length: 27 mi (43 km)
- Location: Minnesota, United States
- Trailheads: Belle Plaine 44.6319°N 93.7651°W; Shakopee 44.7953°N 93.4206°W
- Use: Mixed-use path
- Season: Year-round
- Sights: Minnesota River Valley
- Hazards: Muddy; flooding

Minnesota Valley State Trail is a 27-mile (43 km), multi-use trail in the Minneapolis-Saint Paul metropolitan area that runs parallel to the Minnesota River from the cities of Belle Plaine to Shakopee. A 10-mile (16 km) segment of the trail from Chaska to Shakopee is paved. Allowable trail uses include hiking, biking, horseback riding, cross-country skiing, and snowmobiling. First established in 1969, and never fully completed, the trail is undergoing a 13.5 mile (22 km) extension in 2019 and 2020.

== Route ==
Minnesota Valley State Trail weaves in and out of floodplain areas and forests, with dense oak forests, oak savannas, wetlands, and lakes as the most common features. The portion of the trail through the Minnesota Valley State Recreation Area has many floodplains. Low-lying areas on the trail, especially close to the banks of the Minnesota River, are prone to periodic flooding. The trail has a total elevation gain of 1,288 feet (393 m) over its lengthy course, but it is relatively flat with elevation ranging from 713 feet (218 m) to 800 feet (242 m) above sea level.

Some maps and trail users imprecisely refer to the Minnesota Valley State Trail as the “State Corridor Trail.” In Minnesota, a state trail corridor refers to a network of interconnected, long-distance trails providing cross-jurisdictional linkage. The Minnesota Department of Natural Resources manages some state corridor trails and segments, while other trails/segments may be entirely managed by local governments but still included in a statewide inventory. Minnesota Valley State Trail is one example of a state corridor trail.

== History ==
The Minnesota River valley has been a vital, but overlooked natural area, especially as it approaches confluence with the Mississippi River near Fort Snelling State Park. In 1969, the Minnesota Legislature established a state trail system in the Minnesota River valley from the city of Le Sueur to Fort Snelling State Park. By 2019, only the 27-mile segment from Belle Plaine to Shakopee had been developed, including a 17-mile (27 km) natural surface trail from Belle Plaine to Chaska, and a 10-mile (16 km) paved trail from Chaska to Shakopee.

The Minnesota Department of Natural Resources is responsible for maintaining the trail, though segments of it pass through areas under state, local, and federal jurisdiction. Future expansion of the trail is desired by the department should additional resources be available.

The Minnesota Department of Natural Resources began the construction of the new trail segment through the city of Bloomington in 2019. The 13.5 mile (22 km) extension pushes the northern end of the trail up from the Bloomington Ferry Bridge to the Minnesota Valley National Wildlife Refuge Visitor Center, which lies within the Mississippi National River and Recreation Area. After the extension is complete, trail users will be able to connect to the Big Rivers Regional Trail at the wildlife refuge. Portions of the trail extension are slated to be paved, which generated some local controversy, especially from mountain biking enthusiasts.

== See also ==
- Minnesota Valley Wetland Management District
