= Minnehaha Trail =

Shared-use path in Minneapolis

Coordinates: 44°53′46″N 93°11′35″W

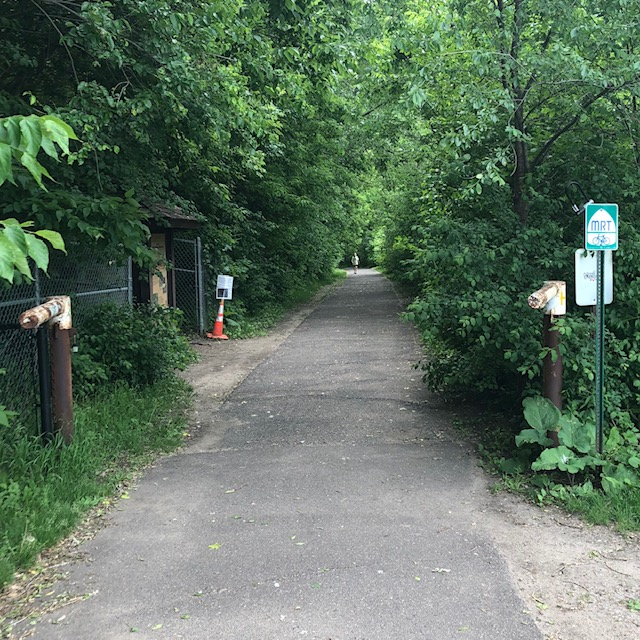
- The north entrance of Minnehaha Trail from Minnehaha Regional Park.
- Length: 1.5 mi (2.4 km)
- Location: Minneapolis, Minnesota, United States
- Designation: U.S. Bicycle Route 45; Mississippi River Trail
- Trailheads: Minnehaha Regional Park; Fort Snelling State Park
- Use: Biking; Hiking; Dogs must be on leash
- Elevation change: 272 feet (83 m)
- Difficulty: Easy
- Season: Year round
- Sights: Forest canopy; Mississippi River gorge; Wildlife
- Hazards: Poor trail maintenance

Minnehaha Trail is a 1.5-mile (2.4 km) paved, multi-use trail in Minneapolis, Minnesota, United States, that connects Minnehaha Regional Park and Fort Snelling State Park – two of the most popular recreation destinations in the Twin Cities metro area. The trail is considered a segment of a longer, loosely connected bicycle route system along the Mississippi River. Users of Minnehaha Trail traverse under a forest canopy. The trail received local recognition for its natural beauty, but it was criticized for its worn pavement and lack of signage.

== Route description ==
The 1.5-mile (2.4 km), or 3-mile (4.8 km) round trip, Minnehaha Trail connects adjacent Minnehaha Regional Park and Fort Snelling State Park. Despite the large number of visitors each park receives, Minnehaha Trail is described as lightly trafficked. Beginning at its southern end in Fort Snelling State Park near the Thomas C. Savage Visitor Center, the trail is a gentle climb of 272 feet (83 m) through a thick forest with occasional views of the Mississippi River gorge. Once reaching Minnehaha Regional Park near an off-leash dog park, users may connect to park trails or the regional Grand Rounds trail system. From the southern trail end, users may connect seamlessly to Snelling Lake Trail.

=== Other trails ===
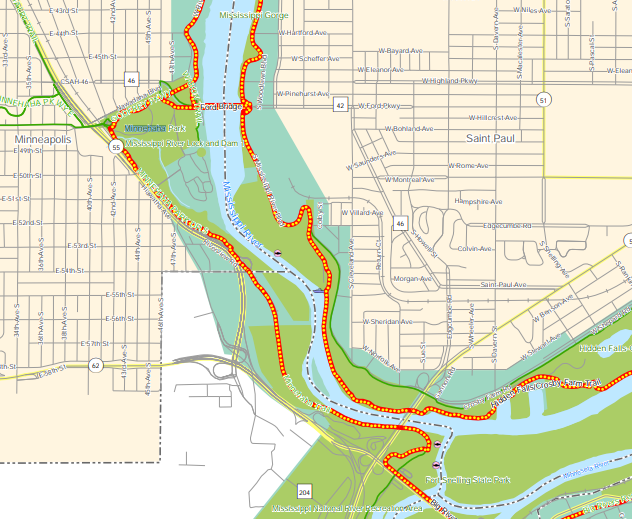
Map of Minnehaha Trail and the connecting network of bicycle trails in Minneapolis–Saint Paul

It is difficult for users to properly identify Minnehaha Trail due to the vast network of multi-use paths in the area, errors by digital mapping services, and lack of signage. Some mapping services incorrectly label Minnehaha Trail as the "Minnesota Valley State Trail," which does not reach Fort Snelling State Park.

A separate bicycle trail that begins from its northernmost point near Coldwater Spring follows closely alongside Highway 55, allowing a user to travel under the highway near Tower Avenue and Bloomington Road or to reach the parking lots of the upper portion of Fort Snelling State Park and its historic structures. Some mapping services identify this separate route as the "Fort Snelling State Trail" and some users conflate it with the Minnehaha Trail. Other maps label the bike trail closest to Highway 55 as the "Hiawatha MDOT Trail."

A steep, unlabeled multi-use trail near the historic fort structure connects the upper and lower portions of Fort Snelling State Park, allowing for connection to multiple trails and routes. From the upper portion of the park near a chapel, trail users can gain access to the Big Rivers Regional Trail.

=== Bicycle route network ===
Minnehaha Trail is included as a segment of the Mississippi River Trail, or MRT, which is a bicycle route loosely connecting 800 miles (1,300 km) of pre-existing roads and trails in Minnesota into a signed course. The Mississippi River Trail portion in Minnesota is also known as U.S. Bicycle Route 45. A few worn "MRT" signs are visible on Minnehaha Trail, but the area is known for inadequate signage.

== Recognition and criticism ==
Minneapolis alternative newspaper City Pages recognized Minnehaha Trail as the region's best bicycle route in 2012:

When it comes to bike trails, the Twin Cities suffers from an embarrassment of riches. But for our money, the most beautiful stretch has to be the Minnehaha Trail, which runs from Minnehaha Park through Fort Snelling State Park…. The bike path runs under a lush canopy of trees, beneath the bluffs overlooking the Mississippi River, and feels like a genuine escape from the city.

However, in 2016, Minnehaha Trail was described as “badly in need of a makeover” as some stretches were nearly too bumpy and difficult to traverse on a bicycle.

== See also ==
- List of shared-use paths in Minneapolis
- Mississippi National River and Recreation Area
- United States Bicycle Route System
