= Minnesota Valley National Wildlife Refuge =

United States protected natural area near Minneapolis

- IUCN category IV (habitat/species management area)
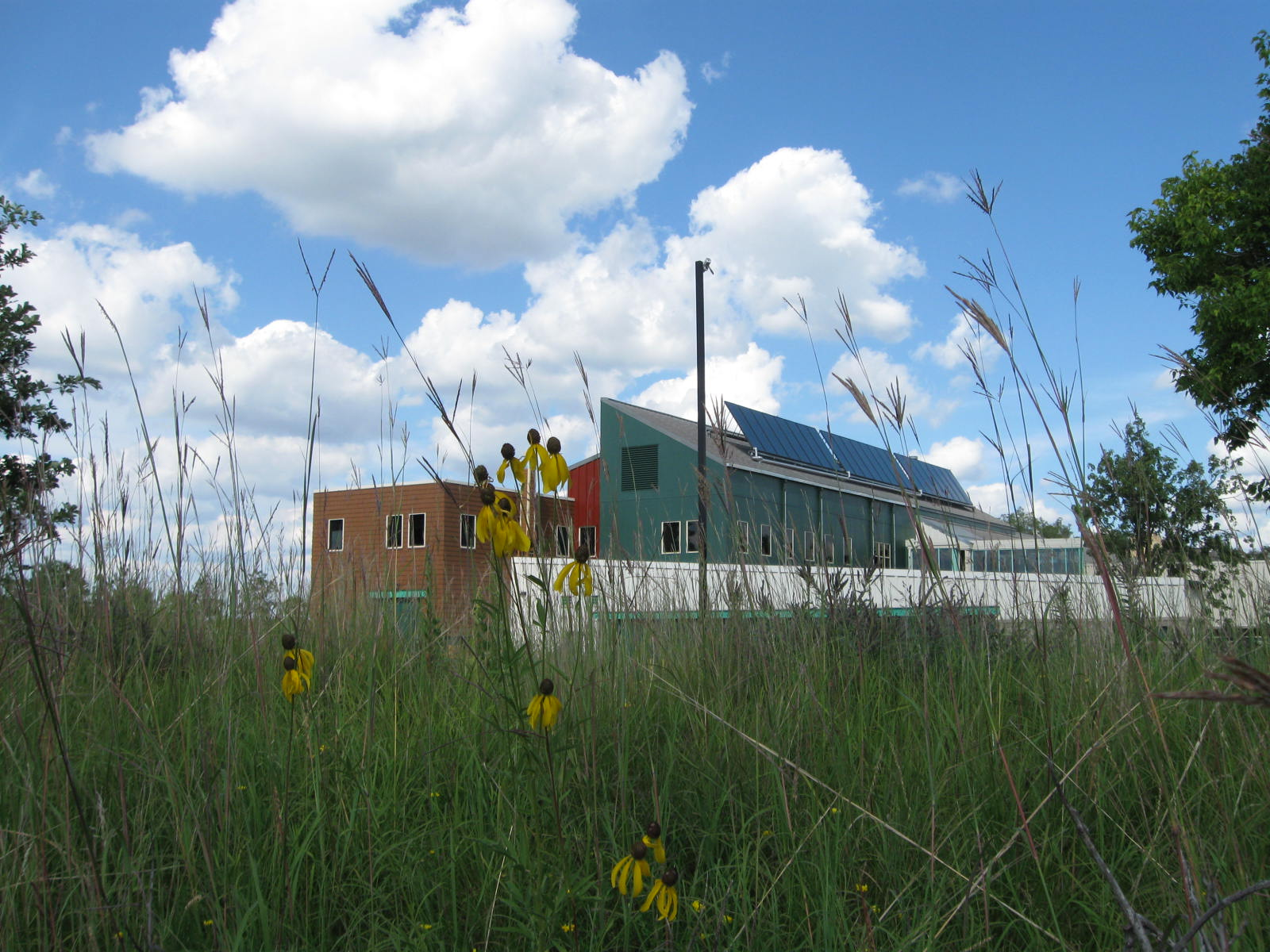
- Bloomington Education and Visitor Center

- Location within the United States
- Location: Dakota, Hennepin, Scott, Carver, Sibley, Le Sueur Ramsey counties, Minnesota, USA
- Nearest city: Bloomington, Minnesota
- Coordinates: 44°51′37″N 93°13′0″W
- Area: 14,000 acres (5,666 ha)
- Established: 1976
- Governing body: United States Fish and Wildlife Service
- Website: Minnesota Valley National Wildlife RefugeMinnesota Valley National Wildlife Refuge Facebook Page

The Minnesota Valley National Wildlife Refuge is a 14,000-acre (5,666-hectare) National Wildlife Refuge in eastern and central Minnesota. Located just south of the city of Minneapolis, it is one of fourteen Regional Priority Urban Wildlife Refuges in the nation. Many parts of the refuge are near large establishments of Minneapolis–Saint Paul; the Bloomington Education and Visitor Center and two trailheads are located just blocks from the Mall of America, the Wilkie Unit is just east of Valleyfair, and the Louisville Swamp Unit is just south of the Minnesota Renaissance Festival.

The refuge stretches southwest through Minneapolis's outer-ring suburbs to Henderson, Minnesota. There are eleven refuge units strung along 70 miles (113 km) of the Minnesota River. The various refuge units are interspersed with units of the Minnesota Valley State Recreation Area. Although the National Wildlife Refuge is managed by the United States Fish and Wildlife Service (USFWS) and the state recreation area by the Minnesota Department of Natural Resources, both agencies share a consistent signage to simplify visitation.

The Refuge has two visitor centers:

The Bloomington Education and Visitor Center is at 3815 American Boulevard East in Bloomington and is part of the Long Meadow Lake Unit. There are two hiking trails that can be accessed from the visitor center and many exhibits to explore. The visitor center is open Wednesday through Sunday, 10 a.m. - 5 p.m.

The Rapids Lake Education and Visitor Center is at 15865 Rapids Lake Road in Carver and is part of the Rapids Lake Unit. There are two hiking trails that can be accessed from the visitor center and short hikes will lead to rewarding views of the Minnesota River and the Carver Rapids. The visitor center is open Saturday and Sunday, 10 a.m. - 5 p.m.

Land and trails are open daily, 5:00 a.m. - 10:00 p.m. The refuge does not groom trails during the winter season.

== Refuge units ==
There are 13 refuge units, listed east to west.

=== Round Lake Unit ===
Round Lake in Arden Hills is owned and managed by the USFWS as the Round Lake Unit of the Refuge. Ownership of Round Lake was transferred from the United States Army to the USFWS in 1974. The Round Lake Unit is the only portion of the Refuge located within Ramsey County.

=== Long Meadow Lake Unit ===
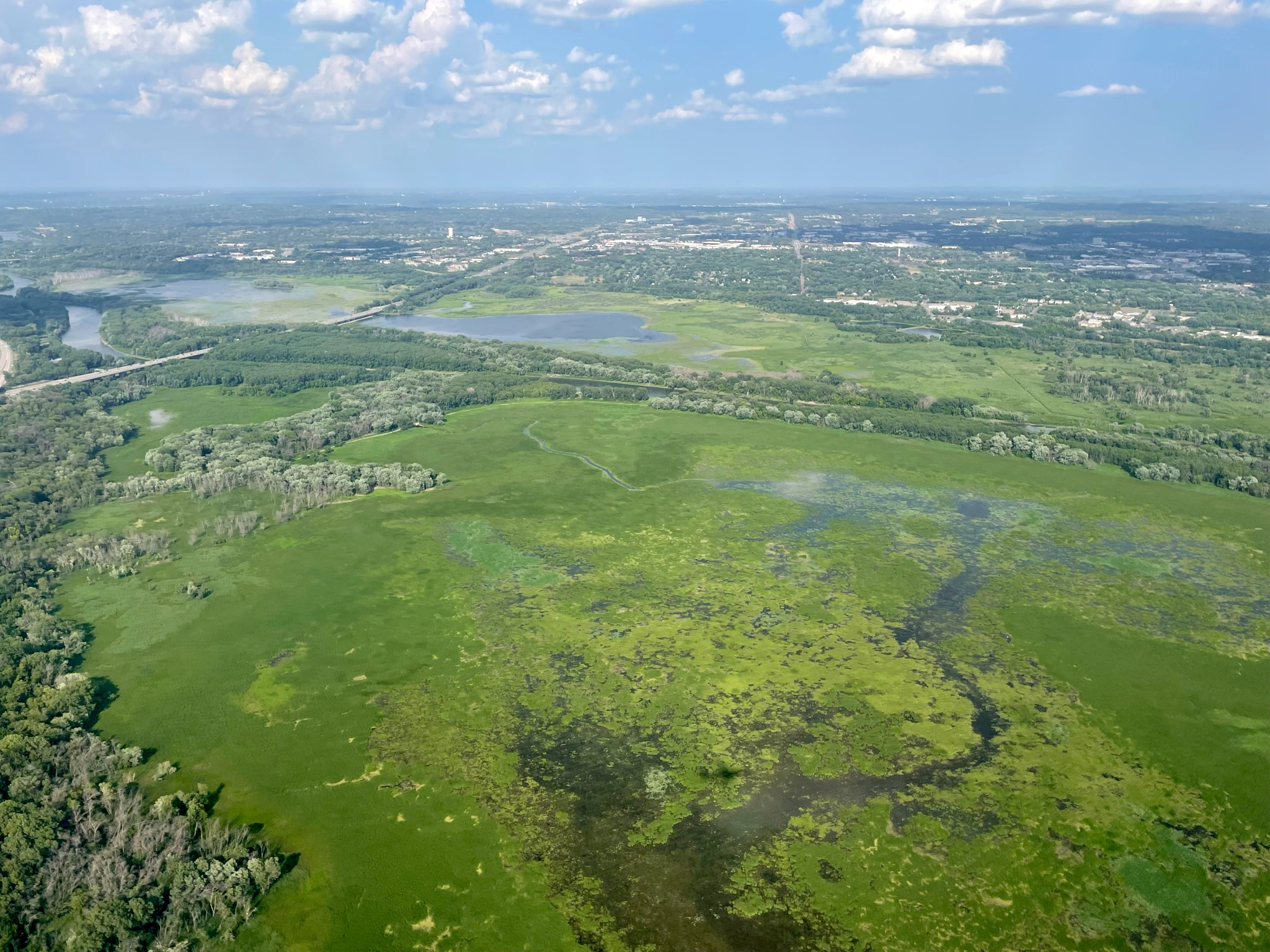
Aerial view of Long Meadow Lake wetlands area

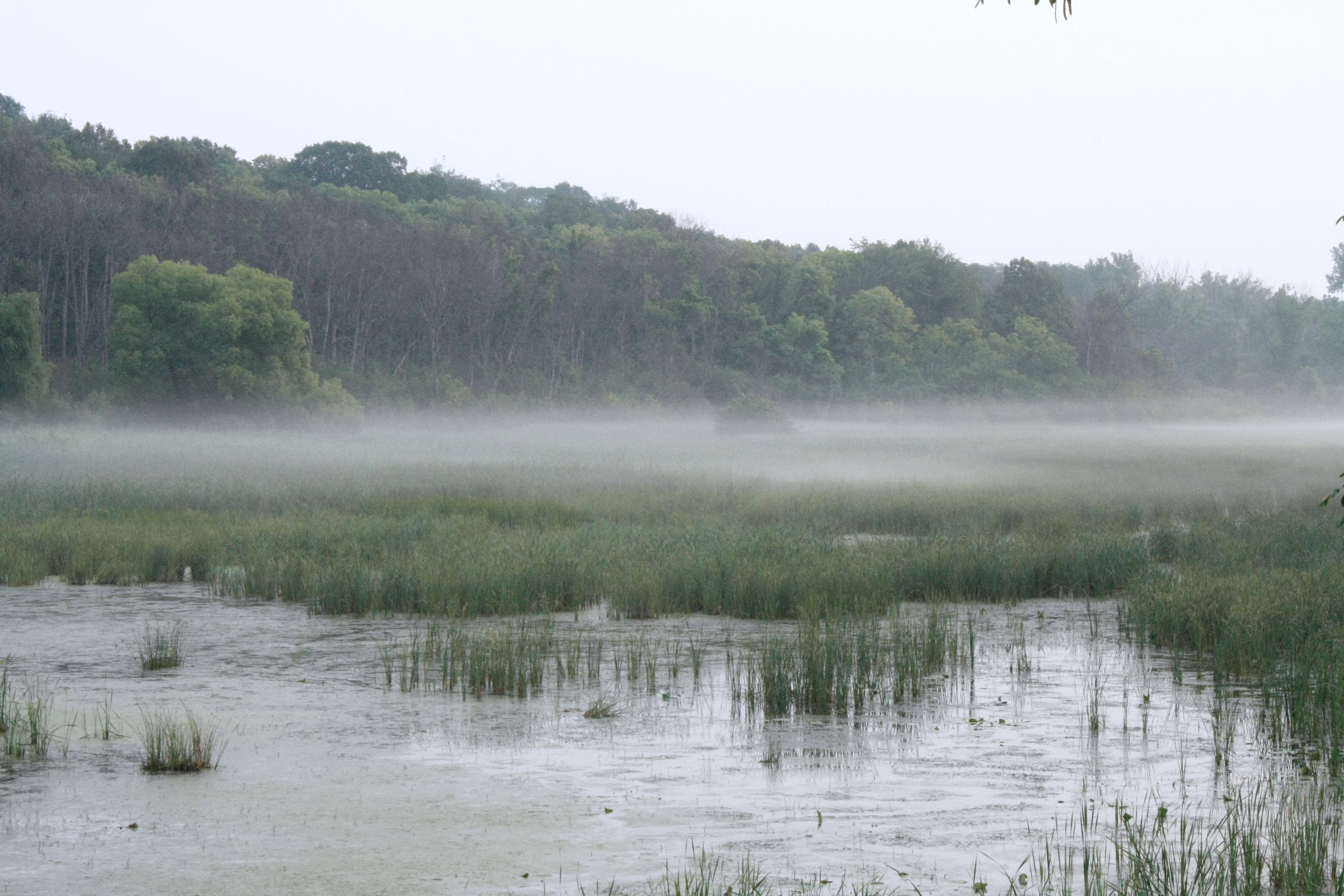
Long Meadow in the Minnesota River Valley

This 2,339 acres (9.47 km^{2}) unit, on the north bank of the Minnesota River near Bloomington, features large marshes and floodplain forest.

Eleven miles (18 km) of trails lead into the valley from the visitor center and three other access points. Pedestrians and bicyclists are able to cross the Cedar Avenue Bridge into Fort Snelling State Park. An interpretive trail circles the man-made Bass Ponds, where the Izaak Walton League raised several fish species to stock lakes statewide in Minnesota from 1926 to the 1950s.

The Old Cedar Avenue Bridge was reopened after undergoing an extensive restoration in late October 2016. The bridge has a new concrete deck with two striped bike lanes down the middle and pedestrian paths on either side of the bridge. The old concrete piers were raised, poor steel was replaced, and the entire bridge was sandblasted and painted in an original gray color over its five refurbished trusses.

There are 14.6 mi (23.5 km) of trails in this unit including the Hillside Trail, and the Long Meadow lake Trail.

To date, the USFWS has done restoration work to the Bluff Trail which heads west to the Lyndale Avenue trailhead. It has built a new elevated boardwalk trail system to the edge of Long Meadow Lake about 1/3 mile (0.54 km) up-lake from the refurbished Cedar Bridge. It has high safety rails and a large wildlife viewing platform. The USFWS has plans to mount two heavy-duty telescopes here next year. One will be for chair users and the other for people who stand. Access is about 150 yards (137 m) up the new Bluff Trail as it follows Orchard Spring Marsh.

The USFWS has carried out trail and landscaping improvements going down-lake from the old Cedar Bridge toward the Minnesota Route 77 Bridge underpass. with about 75% of the trail now fiber-matted and regraded with Class V aggregate. This trail runs alongside Kidder Marsh and Cedar Pond. Once it gets to the MN 77 Bridge a dirt trail passes under the bridge and emerges at Pond C. The old trails then continue farther east toward the Bass Ponds, Hogback Ridge Pond, Fisher Pond, and Skimmer Pond and the exit road to the Bass Ponds parking lot at Old Shakopee Road and East 86th Street in Bloomington.

=== Black Dog Preserve ===
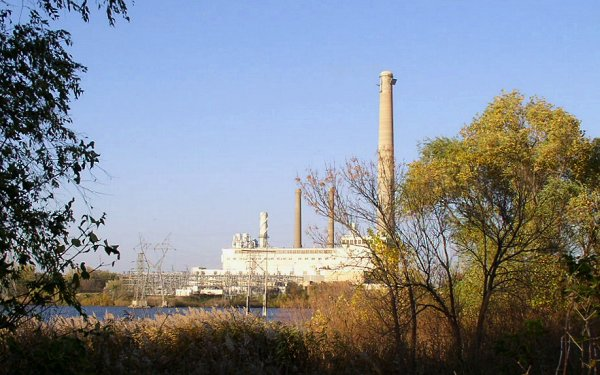
Land leased by the FWS surrounds Black Dog Power Plant

This 1,400 acres (5.7 km^{2}) unit surrounds Black Dog Lake, on the right bank of the Minnesota River in Burnsville. The lake is named after Chief Black Dog, leader of a band of Mdewakanton Sioux who established a permanent summer village here around 1750 and later sold game to American soldiers and settlers at Fort Snelling. The unit preserves prairie and calcareous fen. Xcel Energy’s Black Dog Power Plant rises in the center of the unit. Clean wastewater from the plant is pumped into Black Dog Lake so it may cool before reentering the Minnesota River. Because of this certain waterfowl remain on the lake longer into the winter. The unit was created in 1982 when Xcel Energy agreed to lease the lands to the USFWS. The southwestern corner of the unit is managed as Black Dog Nature Preserve Scientific and Natural Area by the Minnesota DNR.

A two-mile (3.2 km) trail runs through wetlands south of the lake. There is parking at either end of the trail, off River Hills Drive and Cliff Road. There is an observation platform on the north shore of the lake off Black Dog Road.

=== Bloomington Ferry Unit ===
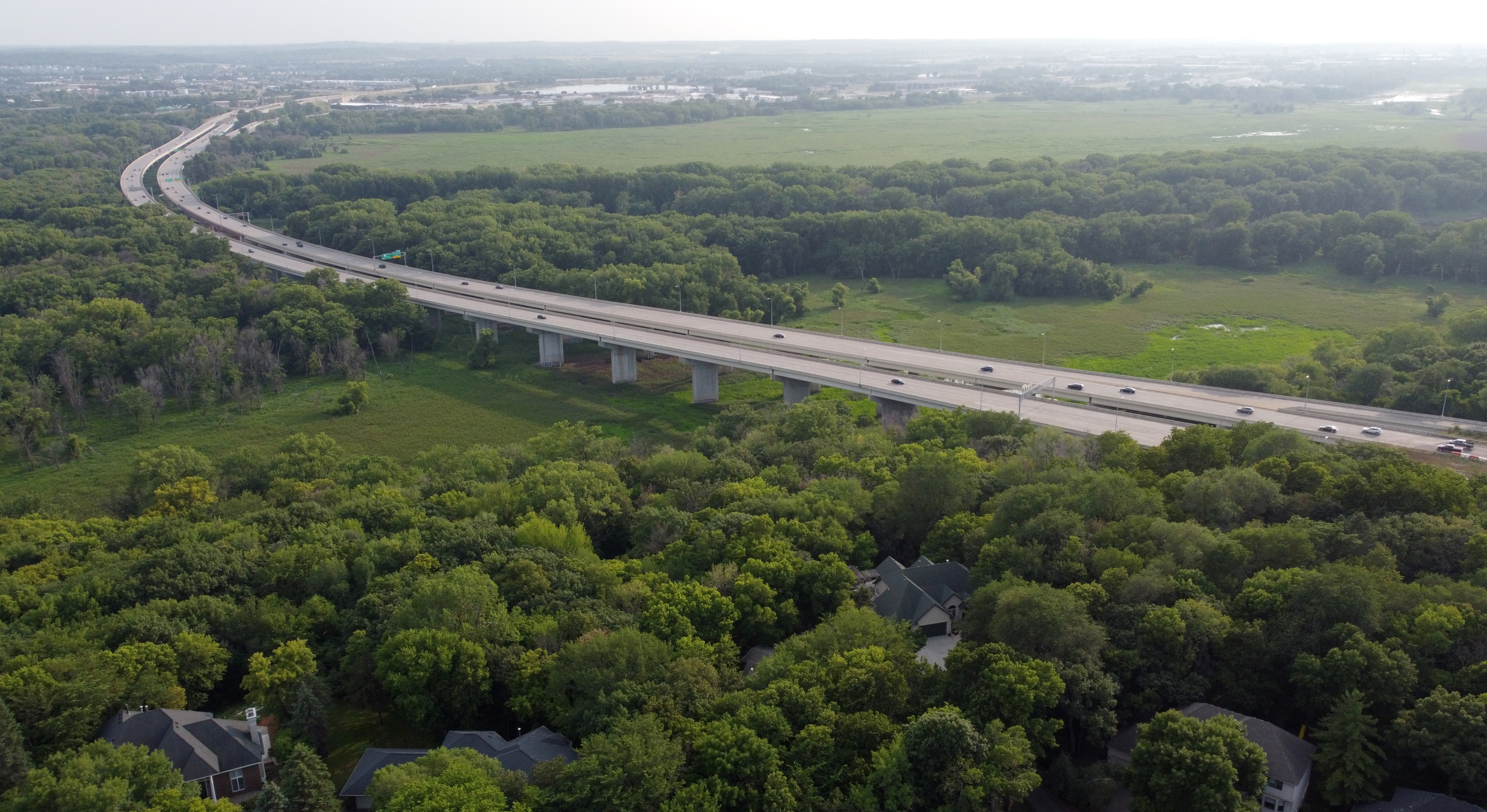
Bloomington Ferry Bridge crosses the marshland of the Minnesota River Valley

The unit, located in the southwest corner of Bloomington, comprises 400 acres (2 square kilometres) of marsh and floodplain forest. It is located predominantly in the river bottoms on the north side of the Minnesota River. A significant wetland area, Opus Marsh, encompasses a portion of the east half of the unit. A connecting trail and pedestrian bridge also allow access to the Refuge's Wilkie Unit. From a parking area there is a one-mile (1.6 km) linear trail along the riverbank and a bridge to the Wilkie Unit.

=== Wilkie Unit ===
Consisting of 2,100 acres (8 square kilometres), the Wilkie Unit is located just south of the Minnesota River in Savage and Shakopee. The Wilkie Unit is located predominantly in the river bottoms, and features three lakes (Blue, Rice, and Fisher) and large areas of associated marsh. There are also extensive areas of bottomland forest, as well as stands of coniferous trees. A connecting trail and pedestrian bridge also allow access to the Refuge's Bloomington Ferry Unit. Five miles (8 km) of trail and abandoned farm roads are open for hiking and cross-country skiing year-round. Additionally, the state's largest great blue heron rookery, with over 600 nests, was found on the western shore of Blue Lake. The rookery no longer exists due to severe weather events in 1980 and 1998 that blew trees and nests down.

=== Upgrala Unit ===
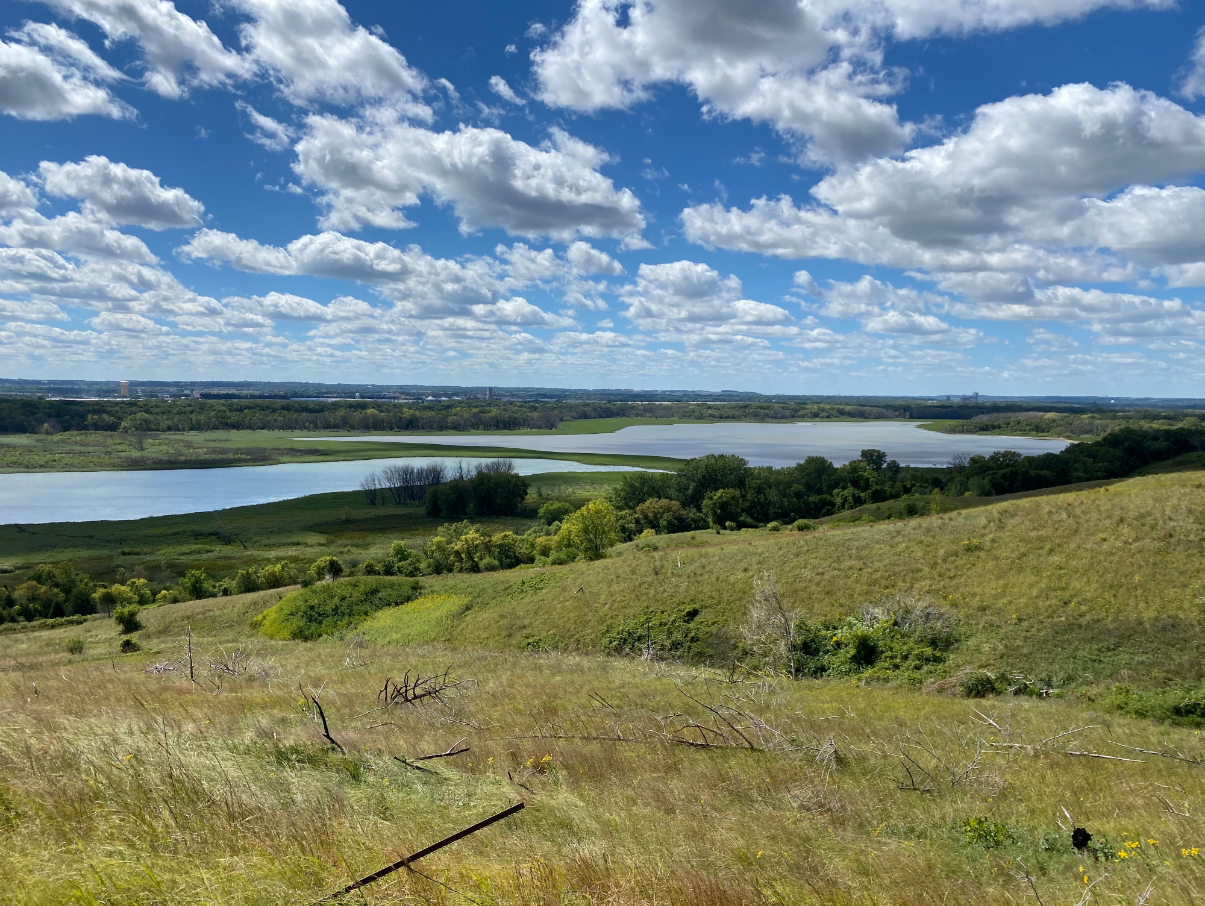
A view of the Upgrala Unit on September 3, 2020.

Although 2,450 acres (9.9 km^{2}) are authorized for this unit, most of the land has not yet been acquired from private owners. There is currently no public access to this mosaic of marshes, prairie, and floodplain forest. The authorized area for this unit stretches from the Old Highway 169 bridge (now County Road 101) north of Shakopee and eastward along the bluffs in the southern part of Eden Prairie, Minnesota. "Upgrala" is a shortened name for Upper Grass Lake.

=== Chaska Unit ===
This 600-acre (2.4 km^{2}) unit was acquired in 2001 and occupies a bend in the Minnesota River stretching between the towns of Chaska and Carver. It consists of lake, marsh, old fields, and river bottom hardwood forest and a two-mile (3.2 km) trail runs through these habitats. There are ample opportunities for observing waterfowl, shorebirds and other waders during spring, late summer, and fall. There is parking at either end, at the Chaska Ballpark and Riverside Park in Carver.

=== Louisville Swamp Unit ===
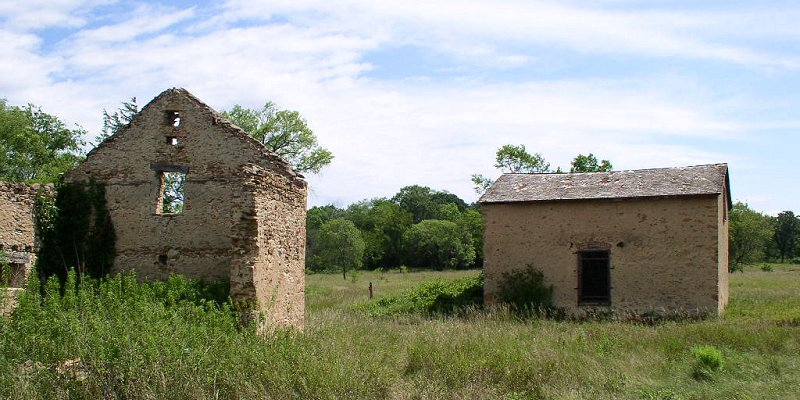
Remains of the 1880 barn and a restored granary at Jabs Farm

The centerpiece of this 2,600-acre (11 km^{2}) unit is the marsh called Louisville Swamp. U.S. Fish & Wildlife Service staff estimate that Louisville Swamp floods three out of every five years, and trail closures are common. A water control structure helps regulate the outflow into Sand Creek, a short course which flows into the Minnesota River. The unit also includes dry lands above the bluffs which bear old fields, prairie, and oak savanna. The unit is located on the Eastern bank of the river just north of Jordan, Minnesota.

There was once a Wahpeton Sioux village called Inyan Ceyaka Otonwe, or Little Rapids, here. The unit's Mazomani Trail is named after a Wahpeton chief. Jean-Baptiste Faribault built a fur trading post near the village in 1802 and lived here for seven years. The exact site of the village and trading post are lost, but the remains of two historic farmsteads are still visible. The Ehmiller Farmstead is in ruins, but at the Jabs Farm two buildings have been restored and a third stabilized. The barn was built in 1880 by Robert and Anna Riedel. Frederick Jabs bought the 379 acres (1.53 km^{2}) farmstead in 1905 and his family lived there as subsistence farmers until 1952.

The unit has 13 miles (21 km) of trail for hiking and cross-country skiing. The parking lot for this unit is a few dozen yards past the Minnesota Renaissance Festival parking. Traffic during the festival (weekends from mid-August through September) significantly impedes access to the Louisville Swamp unit.

=== Rapids Lake and San Francisco Units ===
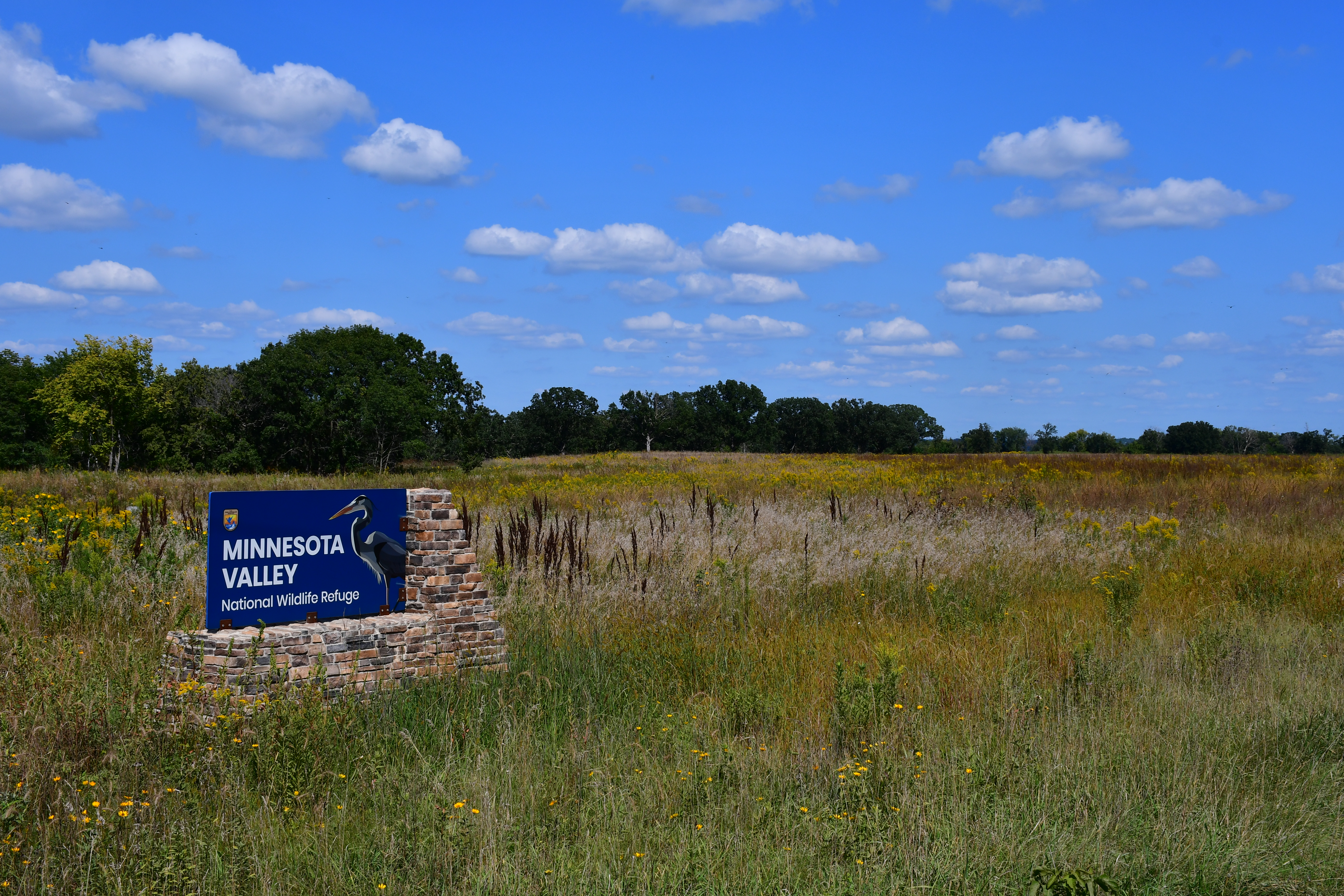
Entrance sign to the Rapids Lake Unit.

This 1,888-acre (7.64 km^{2}) unit is on the left bank of the river across from the Louisville Swamp Unit. Old fields were restored to prairie and oak savanna and there is also bottom-land forest and a wetland that were restored in 1992. Part of the unit was once a turkey farm.

The U.S. Fish & Wildlife Service has constructed the Rapids Lake Education and Visitor Center, which includes the visitor center, an outdoor education center, a bunkhouse for interns and a maintenance shop. The visitor center facility includes an outdoor restroom that is open sunrise to sunset.

There are three miles (4.8 km) of trails in the unit. The two access points are on County Road 45, two miles (3.2 km) apart.

Two small parcels in the southwest corner of the Rapids Lake Unit are considered part of a distinct unit: the San Francisco Unit.

=== St. Lawrence, Jessenland and Blakeley Units ===
These three units are new additions to the refuge. The St. Lawrence Unit covers 303 acres (123 ha) and is located in St. Lawrence Township. The Jessenland Unit covers 1,827 acres (739 ha) and is located in Blakely Township and Henderson Township. The Blakeley Unit covers 136 acres (55 ha) and is located in Blakely Township south of the town of Blakeley and north of Salisbury Hill Road.

== History ==
Early plans to create a refuge along the Minnesota River were forestalled by the U.S. participation in World War II (1941–1945). It was not until the early 1970s that the threat of development inspired concerted efforts to preserve the valley. The United States Congress passed an act creating the Minnesota Valley National Wildlife Refuge in 1976.

Long Meadow Lake is spanned by a wood and steel bridge built in 1920. Known as the Old Cedar Avenue Bridge, it was turned over to the city of Bloomington in 1979 when the Minnesota Department of Transportation constructed a new bridge nearby. In poor repair, the old bridge was closed to vehicular traffic in 1993 but remained a crucial link for pedestrians and cyclists until officials closed the bridge entirely in 2002. Construction began in May 2015 and reopened to the public in 2016

In the late 1990s, Minneapolis–Saint Paul International Airport planned a new runway which would route air traffic over parts of the refuge. A real estate appraisal firm arbitrated a settlement to compensate the refuge for the environmental impact of the resulting noise pollution. The airport's commission accepted the settlement in 1998 and ultimately paid $26 million into the Minnesota Valley Trust. As of 2013 the original mitigation plan has been completed and the Minnesota Valley Trust continues to do work in the area

== Sources ==
- Blake, Laurie. "Runway's impact on refuge put at $20 million." Minneapolis Star-Tribune: Sep 18, 1998.
- Francisco, Mollee. "Wildlife refuge spreads wings". Chaska Herald: Sep 1, 2005.
- Smith, Mary Lynn. "For trail users, old bridge is a missed link." Minneapolis Star-Tribune: Apr 16, 2005.
- United States Fish and Wildlife Service. Minnesota Valley National Wildlife Refuge signage, brochures, and website.
