= Minnesota Valley State Recreation Area =

Protected area in Minnesota, United States

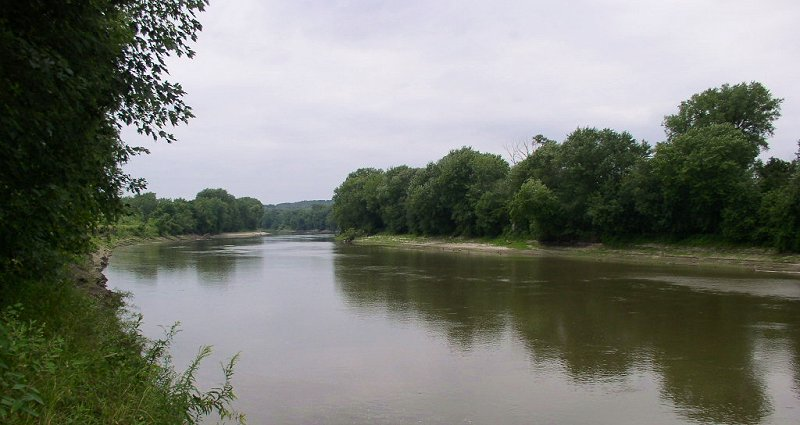
- The Minnesota River from the Gifford Lake unit of the Minnesota Valley State Recreation Area

- Location within Minnesota Location within the United States
- Location: Scott County, Minnesota, United States
- Coordinates: 44°39′43″N 93°42′12″W
- Area: 5,490 acres (22.2 km^{2})
- Established: 1969
- Governing body: Minnesota Department of Natural Resources

Minnesota Valley State Recreation Area is a 5,490-acre (2,222 ha) unit of the Minnesota state park system in Scott County, Minnesota, the United States. The park is not continuous but is composed of waysides, four of which are strung along the Minnesota River between Shakopee and Belle Plaine. The various waysides are interspersed with units of the Minnesota Valley National Wildlife Refuge, a part of the Mississippi National River and Recreation Area. Although the state recreation area is managed by the Minnesota Department of Natural Resources and the national wildlife refuge by the United States Fish and Wildlife Service, both agencies share a consistent signage to simplify visitation.

== History ==
The lower Minnesota River valley had been recognized for its scenic and recreational potential since at least 1939, but when a bill proposing an 18,000-acre (73 km^{2}) state park went before the Minnesota Legislature in 1967 it did not pass. Two years later a scaled-back proposal also failed. However a bill creating the Minnesota Valley State Trail did pass in 1969. The trail was to run from Fort Snelling State Park to the town of Le Sueur and include six waysides totaling over 5,000 acres (20 km^{2}). Even the smallest wayside was larger than some of Minnesota's state parks. In this roundabout way, portions of the valley were added to the state park system. The Minnesota Valley National Wildlife Refuge was authorized in 1976 and additional lands originally desired for the state park received federal protection.
