= Big Rivers Regional Trail =

Rail trail in Minnesota, United States

Coordinates: 44°52′02″N 93°10′26″W

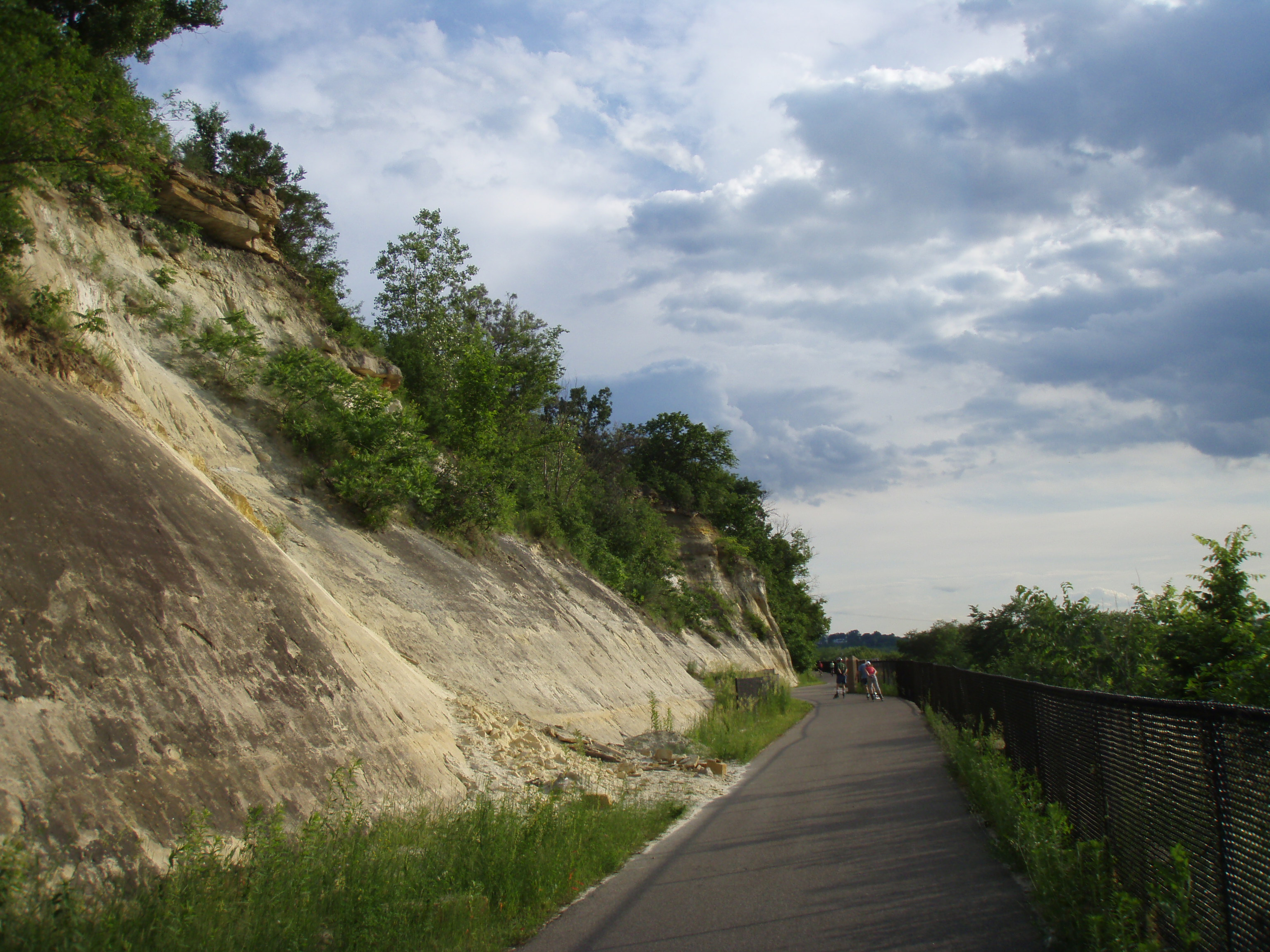
An outcropping of sandstone topped by limestone along the river bluffs

Big Rivers Regional Trail is a paved 4.5-mile (7.2 km) rail trail that overlooks the confluence of the Minnesota and Mississippi rivers along the northern edge of Dakota County, Minnesota, United States. It runs between the cities of Eagan and Lilydale.

The trail also links to the 72-mile (116 km) Mississippi National River and Recreation Area, hundreds of miles of trails throughout the greater Minneapolis–Saint Paul metropolitan area, and historic landmarks including Fort Snelling, Pike Island and the city of Mendota, one of Minnesota's oldest settlements.

The Big Rivers Trailhead provides access to a nearly flat paved trail built on an abandoned railroad bed. Minnesota State Highway 55 in Mendota Heights, I-494 in Eagan, and I-35E in Mendota Heights are additional access points to the Big Rivers Regional Trail.

== Route ==
The trail is 5.54 miles (8.92 km) long.

The trail begins atop an overpass that parallels I-494. It descends and heads north, paralleling Minnesota State Highway 13. The trail crosses the Sibley Memorial Highway and intersects a 0.47-mile (0.76 km) spur connecting to a local trail. The trail leaves modern MN 13 but parallels the old alignment. It passes under the Mendota Bridge, which carries state highways 55 and 62. It crosses MN 13 under a tunnel and enters the old village of Mendota, a small hamlet that overlooks the Minnesota-Mississippi River confluence. The trail leaves Mendota and crosses MN 13 again, this time at-grade. The trail descends into the valley and parallels the Canadian Pacific railway line. It passes three scenic overlooks. It passes under I-35E and the Lexington Bridge and climbs out of the valley. It crosses MN 13 two more times, under its bridges over Lilydale Road and I-35E respectively. It turns north, paralleling the interstate. It crosses the Lexington Bridge, descends one last time, and terminates at Shepard Road.

== See also ==
- Fort Snelling State Park
- Minnehaha Trail
