= Fort Snelling State Park =

State park in Minnesota, United States

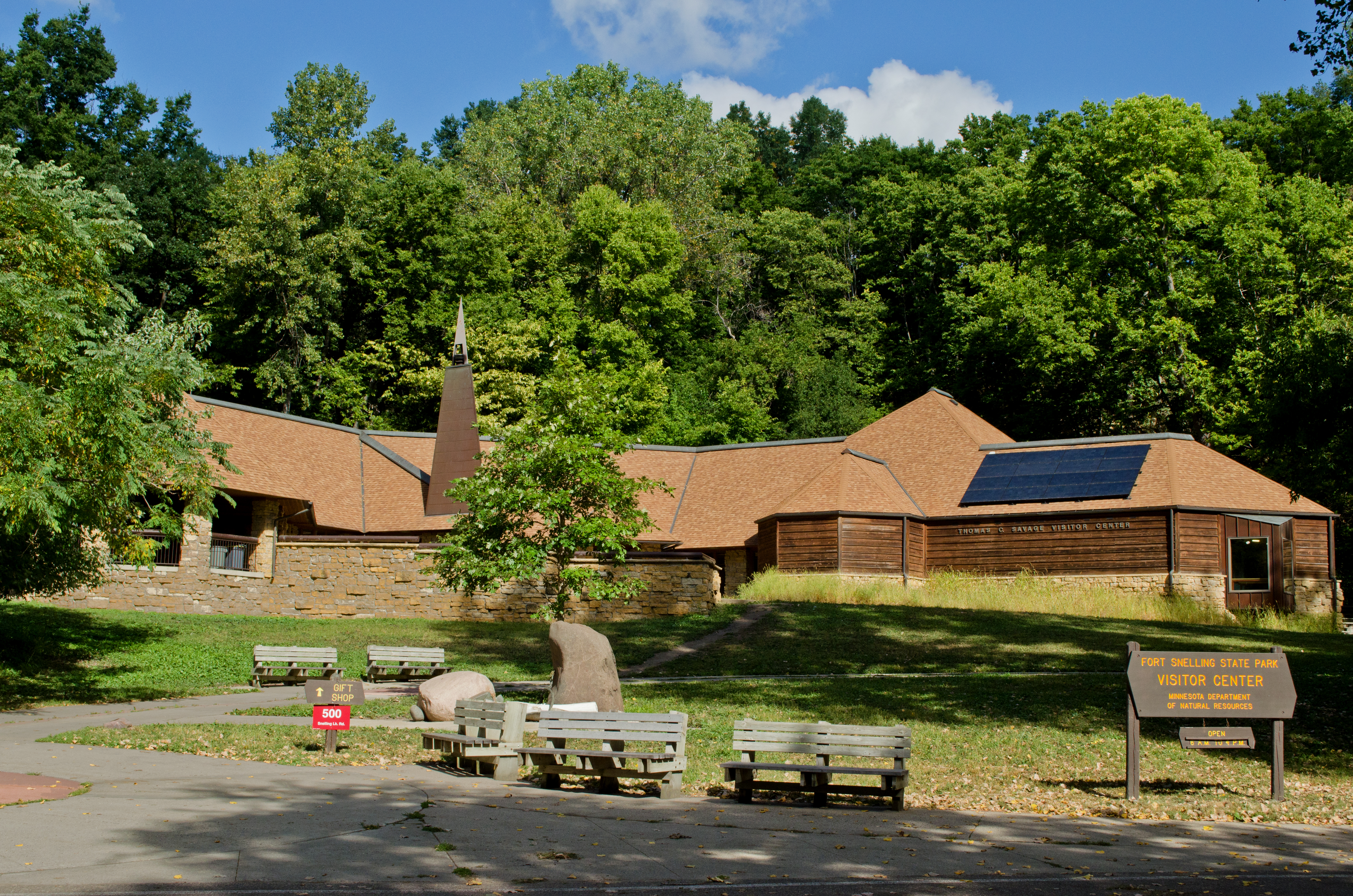
- Thomas C. Savage Interpretive Center

- Location within Minnesota Location within the United States
- Location: Minnesota, United States
- Coordinates: 44°53′09″N 93°10′41″W
- Area: 2,931 acres (11.86 km^{2})
- Elevation: 699 ft (213 m)
- Established: 1962
- Named for: Fort Snelling
- Governing body: Minnesota Department of Natural Resources

Fort Snelling State Park is a state park of the U.S. state of Minnesota, at the confluence of the Mississippi and Minnesota rivers. For many centuries, the area of the modern park has been of importance to the Mdewakanton Dakota people who consider it the center of the Earth. The state park, which opened in 1962, is named for the historic Fort Snelling, which dates from 1820. The fort structure is maintained and operated by the Minnesota Historical Society. The bulk of the state park preserves the bottomland forest, rivers, and backwater lakes below the river bluffs. Both the state and historic fort structure are part of the Mississippi National River and Recreation Area, a National Park Service site.

As of 2005, the park hosts 400,000 visitors annually and contains the restored fort, a visitor center, 18 miles (29 km) of cross-country skiing trails, 18 miles (29 km) of hiking trails, and 5 miles (8.0 km) of biking trails. These trails connect the park to the Minnesota Valley National Wildlife Refuge, Minnehaha Park, and regional trail systems like the Grand Rounds Scenic Byway and the Big Rivers Regional Trail. Minnesota State Highway 55 crosses over the park on the Mendota Bridge, and many jets taking off and landing at the Minneapolis–Saint Paul International Airport fly directly over the park.

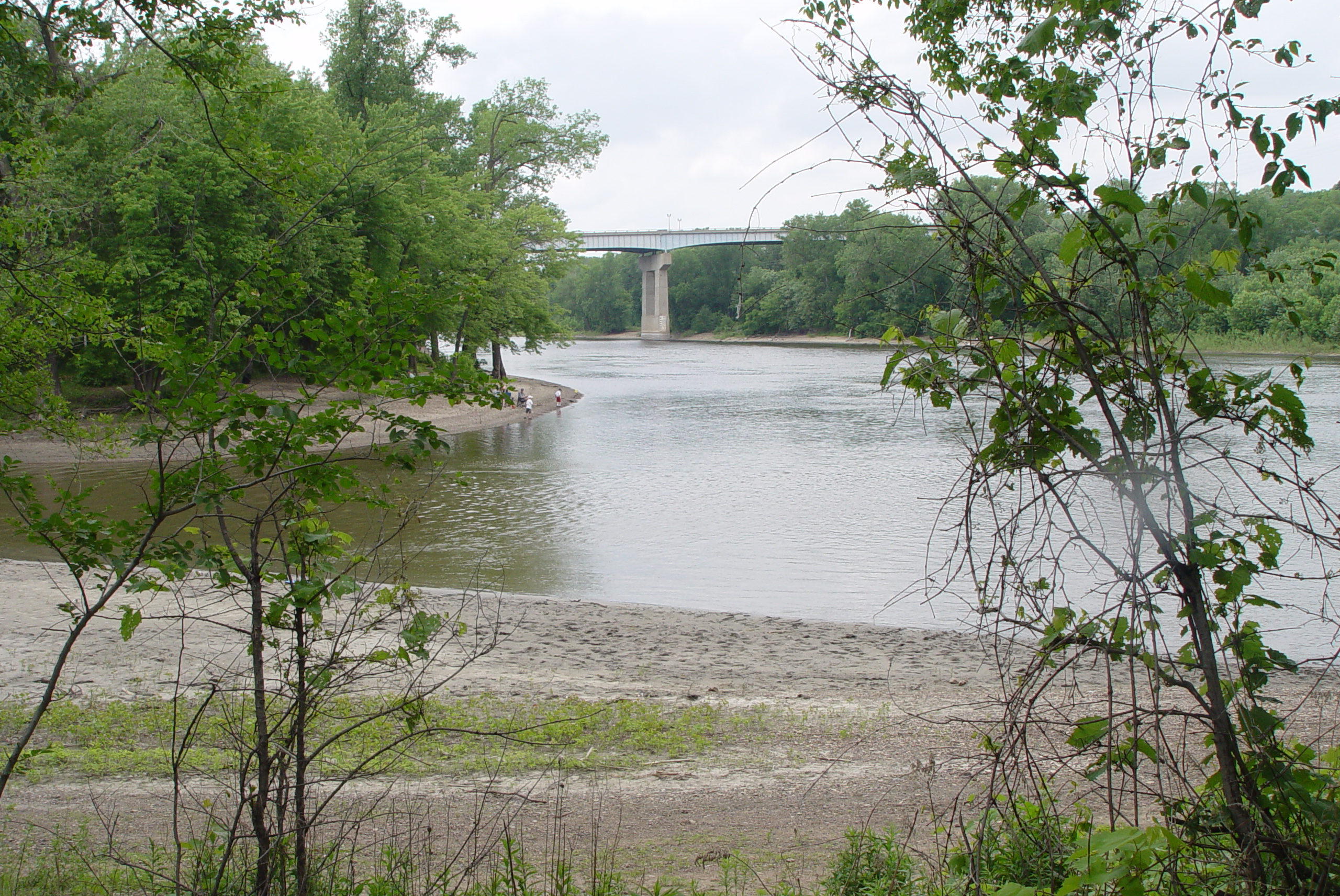
Confluence of the Mississippi and Minnesota Rivers

== Landscape ==
Today the bottomlands of the river confluence boast a floodplain forest of cottonwood, silver maple, green ash, wood nettle, jewelweed, and willow. There are also marshes, backwater lakes, and wet meadows. Abundant wildlife includes white-tailed deer, fox, woodchuck, badger, skunk, turkey, and coyote. Reptiles include the snapping turtle, painted turtle, soft-shelled turtle, and the non-venomous western fox snake. In 1864 a railroad was built through the area, connecting St. Paul with the riverboat landing.

== History ==
At the beginning of historical times, Mdewakanton Dakota lived in this area. The confluence of the Mississippi and Minnesota rivers was to them the center of the world, or the place of first creation, known as the Bdote. In 1805 Lieutenant Zebulon Pike met with the Mdewakanton on the island between the two rivers and negotiated the purchase of land along the blufftops. The treaty site is now known as Pike Island. Fort Snelling was built between 1820 and 1825 on the land Pike acquired. The soldiers from Fort Snelling had gardens, livestock, bakery, and boat storage sheds in the low river valley. Another reality of daily life at the fort was the practice of slavery. Slavery at Fort Snelling lasted from 1820 until 1857, even though slavery was prohibited at the fort under the Missouri Compromise of 1820. In 1828, slavery reached its height at Fort Snelling, and over 30 people were enslaved. In 1830, Rachel and Courtney, two women who were enslaved at Fort Snelling, sued for their freedom in Missouri courts. Despite the Missouri Supreme Court ruling in favor of both of their cases in 1836, slavery continued at Fort Snelling.

From November 7, 1862, to November 13, 1862, immediately following the Dakota War of 1862, over 1,600 Dakota men, women, and children were forced to march from Morton, Minnesota to Fort Snelling. The Dakota were confined to a camp outside of Fort Snelling through the winter of 1862–1863, before being expelled to Nebraska. Over the winter, it is estimated that between 130 and 300 Dakota prisoners died due to malnutrition, disease, and exposure.

Further details about the history of Fort Snelling are located on a separate entry.

During the 1950s, the state government had planned to build a freeway interchange and bridge over the site of the fort, prompting concerned locals and Russell W. Fridley, director of the Minnesota Historical Society, to call a meeting to examine how to preserve the fort. Eventually, the state agreed to build a tunnel underneath the fort, thus preserving the old structures. In 1960, A.R. Nichols, a landscape architect, submitted plans for a 2,400-acre (9.7 km^{2}) park on the site. Based on a much earlier plan, this design would become the basis for the final form of the park. This caught the interest of Thomas C. Savage, who wrote State Parks director U.W. Hella.

Hella urged Savage to form an association of interested citizens which became the Fort Snelling State Park Association, putting money and public relations effort into the promotion of the park's establishment. While there was widespread support for preserving the old fortifications, some local landowners were not enthused about plans to purchase additional lands, claiming that the price the government proposed to pay was not adequate. In response, the Park Association began to raise funds privately to buy out at least some of the owners. A second consideration was whether or not the federal government would grant the actual fort property to the state as surplus land.

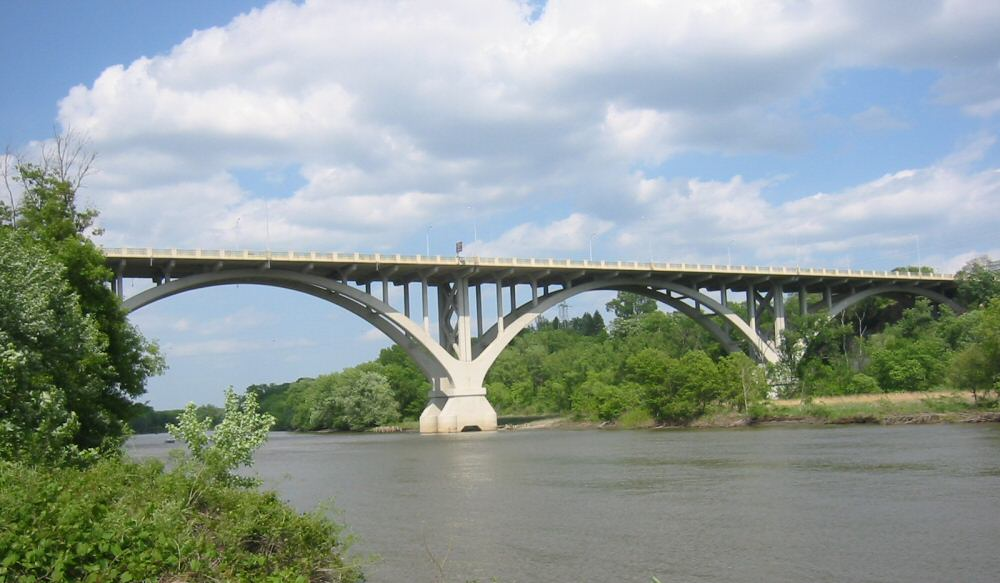
Most of the park lies in bottomland below busy highways and flight paths.

On the last day of the 1961 legislative session, a $65,000 appropriation was made and the park's boundaries were set (on a much smaller scale than can be seen today) so as to acquire the federal land. On October 29, the federal government donated 320 acres (1.3 km^{2}) of land, including portions of the fort, to the State of Minnesota under the 1944 Surplus Property Act. The park was officially opened on June 3, 1962.

The restoration of the fort had begun as early as 1957, and with the establishment of the park, such efforts received new momentum. Old plans were found in the National Archives and the state legislature granted regular appropriations to fund the project until 1979. Limestone to match the original building material was taken from lands owned by the City of Saint Paul and the Webb Publishing Company. Eventually, the remaining half of the fort, which had been occupied by the Department of Veterans Affairs was also donated to the park and restoration of the entire fort could proceed. Structures including walls, the round tower, barracks, the commandant's house, gatehouse, magazine, school, and others were either restored or rebuilt to 19th-century condition. Workers went so far as to recreate the rough trowel tuckpointing of the original stone blocks. Controversially, WPA murals from the 1930s were removed from the interior of the tower.

In 1970 a swimming beach was opened in the park and visitation increased by 75%. In 1987, the Minnesota Department of Natural Resources constructed and dedicated The Wokiksuye K’a Woyuonihan (Remembering and Honoring) Memorial. It is located at the site where the Dakota were imprisoned in 1862. The Thomas Savage Visitor Center opened in 1997, the first year-round interpretive center in the Minnesota state park system. In 2008, the Minnesota Historical Society added the Dred and Harriet Scott Quarters underneath the fort's stone hospital structure and expanded their interpretive offerings to better address the presence of African Americans at the fort. Even without a campground, this is the most visited state park in Minnesota for most years.

== Recreation ==
- Bicycling: 5 miles (8.0 km) of paved trail, connecting to regional paved trails. 10 miles (16 km) of gravel trails.
- Boating: Public boat ramp on Minnesota River by picnic area. Canoe access to lakes and rivers.
- Cross-country skiing: 12 miles (19 km) of groomed ski trails in the park.
- Fishing: Lake and river fishing. Fishing pier on Snelling Lake.
- Hiking: 18 miles (29 km) of hiking trails in the park.
- Interpretation:
  - Thomas C. Savage Visitor Center with exhibits and year-round programs, operated by the Minnesota Department of Natural Resources.
  - Tours of historic Fort Snelling (separate fee), operated by the Minnesota Historical Society. As of the Summer 2025 season, four tours are offered:
    - Fort 101: a 15-minute tour of the fort, included with site admission.
    - Fort Kids: a tour designed for children aged 6–12 and their families. Families learn about the cannon crew, the fort's first fire department, and daily fort life.
    - Garrison Life: a tour that focuses on the lives of soldiers, their families, and enslaved African Americans at the fort. The tour includes a demonstration of weapon firing.
    - African Americans at Fort Snelling: a tour that covers African American history at the fort from 1819 to 1900. The tour includes information about individual fights for freedom through the court system, as well as information about the 25th Infantry.
- Sports:
  - Minneapolis Parks and Recreation operates a nine-hole golf course and a sports field west of the fort, on its historic polo ground.
  - 2 playgrounds, by beach and by picnic area.
  - Park office lends beach volleyball equipment.
- Swimming: Beach on Snelling Lake.
- Weddings and funerals: The Fort Snelling Memorial Chapel, built in 1926, is reservable.
- No camping. The park is day-use only, open from 8am to 10pm.

== See also ==
- Fort Snelling
- Minnehaha Trail
- Minnesota Valley National Wildlife Refuge
- Minnesota Valley State Trail
- Mississippi National River and Recreation Area
- Winchell Trail
