= Minnesota River =

River in Minnesota, United States

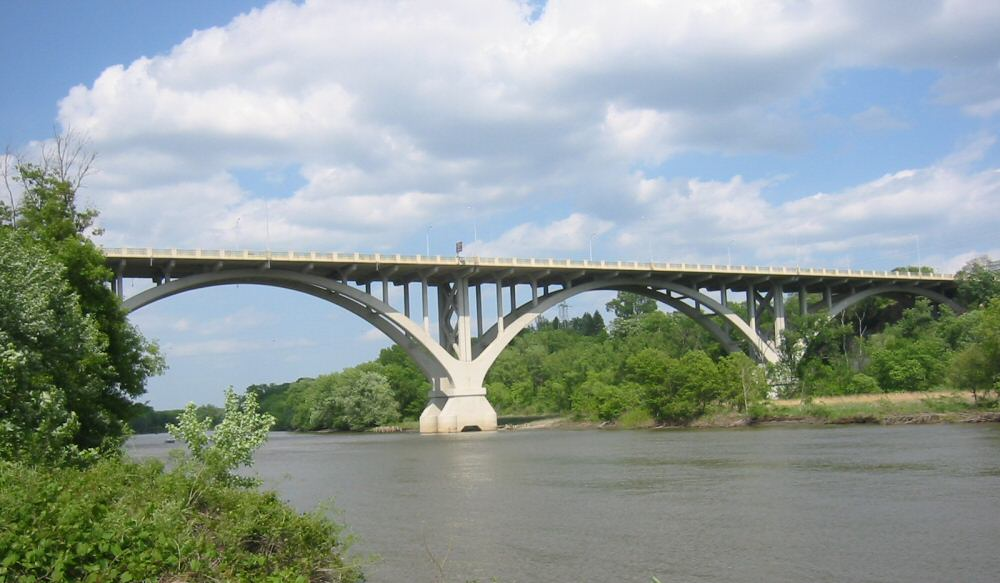
- The Mendota Bridge crossing the Minnesota River, just above its mouth

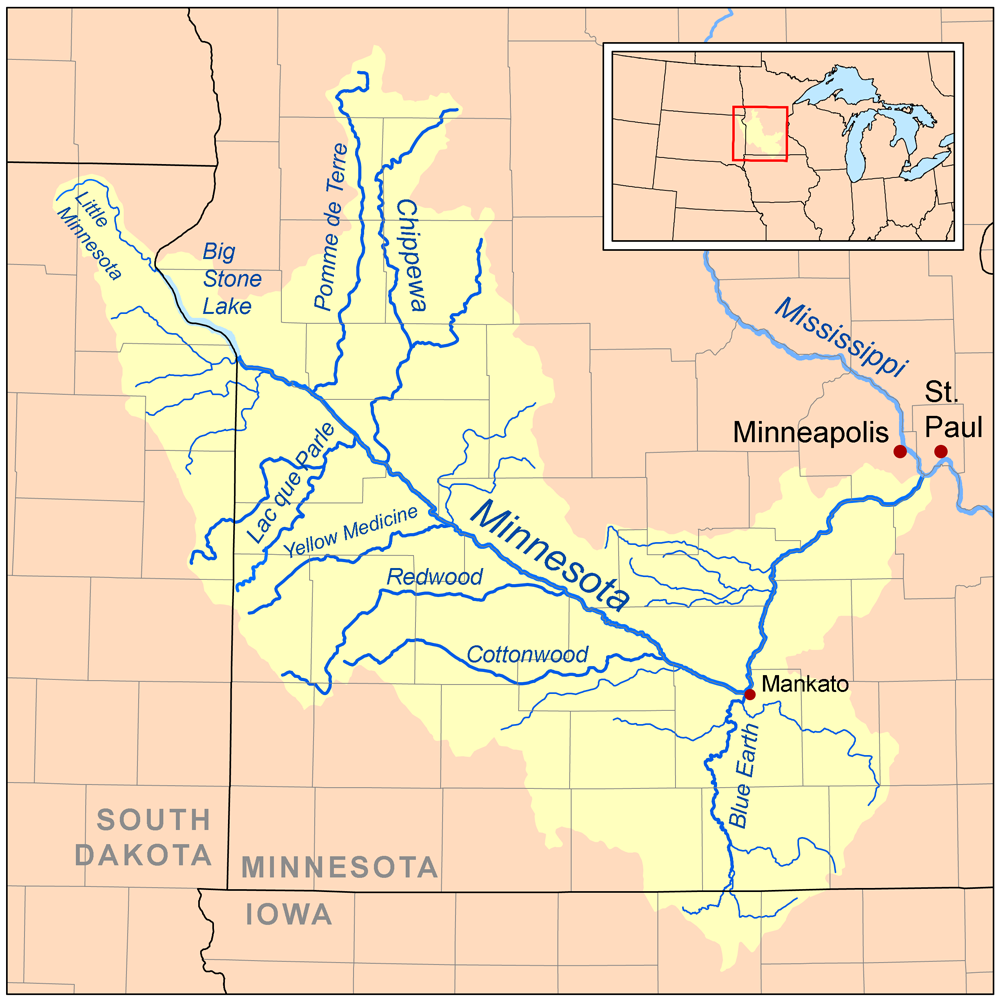
- Map of the Minnesota River
- Native name: Wakpá Mnísota (Dakota)

Location
- Country: United States
- State: Minnesota
- Cities: Bloomington, MN, Eden Prairie, MN, Mankato, MN, Shakopee, MN, Burnsville, MN, Eagan, MN, Le Sueur, MN

Physical characteristics
- Source: Big Stone Lake
  - location: Big Stone Lake, Big Stone County, MN
  - coordinates: 45°18′10″N 96°27′07″W
  - elevation: 964 ft (294 m)
- Mouth: Mississippi River
  - location: Mendota in Dakota County, Minnesota
  - coordinates: 44°53′49″N 93°08′57″W
  - elevation: 690 ft (210 m)
- Length: 370 mi (600 km)
- Basin size: 17,000 sq mi (44,000 km^{2})
- Discharge
  - location: Fort Snelling State Park
  - average: 8,356 cu ft/s (236.6 m^{3}/s) .

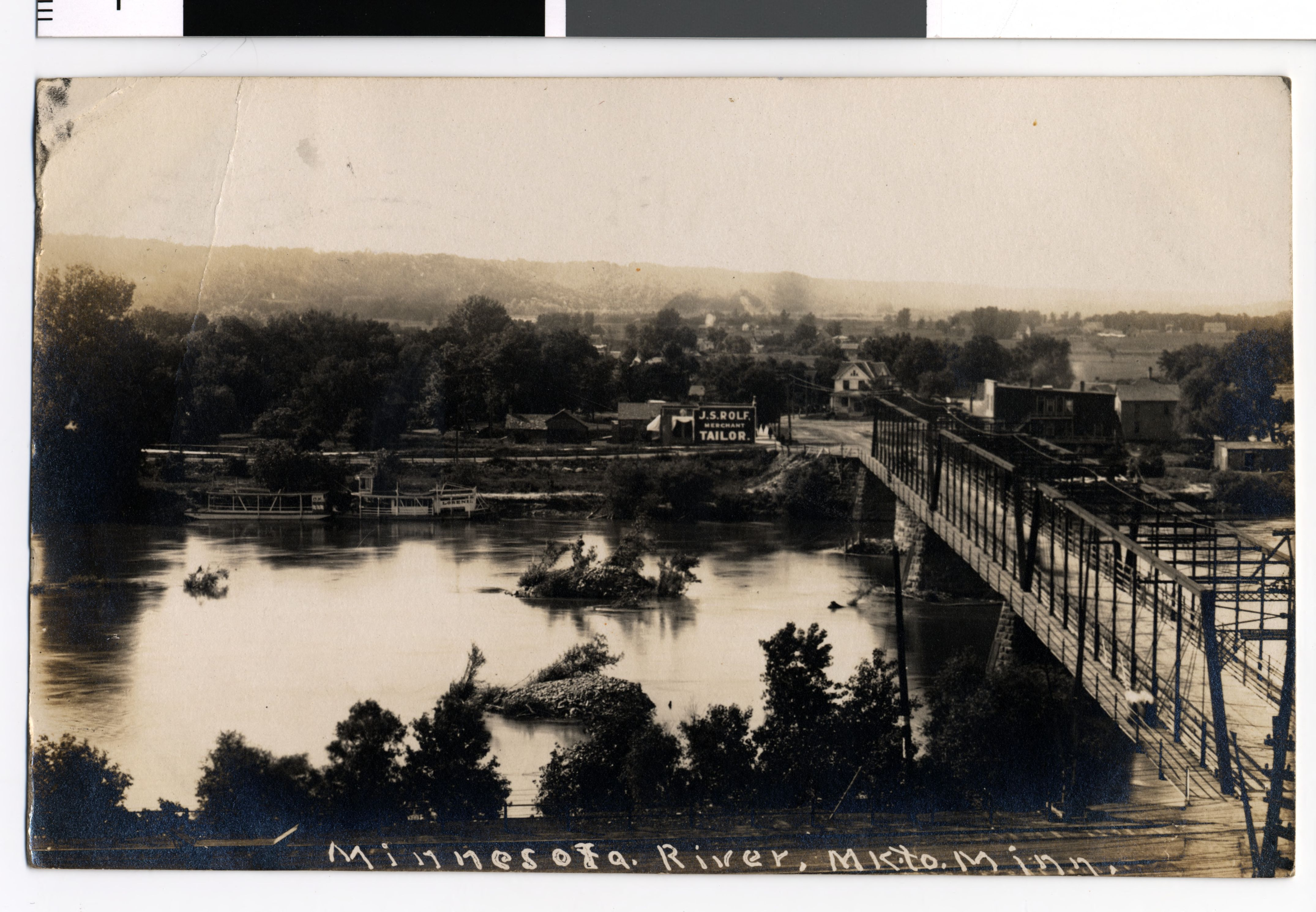
Minnesota River, Mankato, Minnesota

The Minnesota River (Dakota: Mnísota Wakpá) is a tributary of the Mississippi River, approximately 332 miles (534 km) long, in the U.S. state of Minnesota. It drains a watershed of 14,751 square miles (38,200 km^{2}) in Minnesota and about 2,000 sq mi (5,200 km^{2}) in South Dakota and Iowa.

It rises in southwestern Minnesota, in Big Stone Lake on the Minnesota–South Dakota border just south of the Laurentian Divide at the Traverse Gap portage. It flows southeast to Mankato, then turns northeast. It joins the Mississippi at Mendota south of the Twin Cities of Minneapolis and St. Paul, near the historic Fort Snelling. The valley is one of several distinct regions of Minnesota. The name Minnesota comes from the Dakota language phrase, "Mnisota Makoce" which is translated to "land where the waters reflect the sky", as a reference to the many lakes in Minnesota rather than the cloudiness of the actual river. At times, the native variant form "Minisota River" is used. For over a century prior to the organization of the Minnesota Territory in 1849, the name St. Pierre (St. Peter) had been generally applied to the river by French and English explorers and writers. Minnesota River is shown on the 1757 edition of Mitchell Map as "Ouadebameniſsouté [Watpá Mnísota] or R. St. Peter". On June 19, 1852, acting upon a request from the Minnesota territorial legislature, the United States Congress decreed the aboriginal name for the river, Minnesota, to be the river's official name and ordered all agencies of the federal government to use that name when referencing it.

The valley that the Minnesota River flows in is up to five miles (8 km) wide and 250 feet (80 m) deep. It was carved into the landscape by the massive glacial River Warren between 11,700 and 9,400 years ago at the end of the last ice age in North America. Pierre-Charles Le Sueur was the first European known to have traveled along the river. The Minnesota Territory, and later the state, were named for the river.

== Commercial significance ==
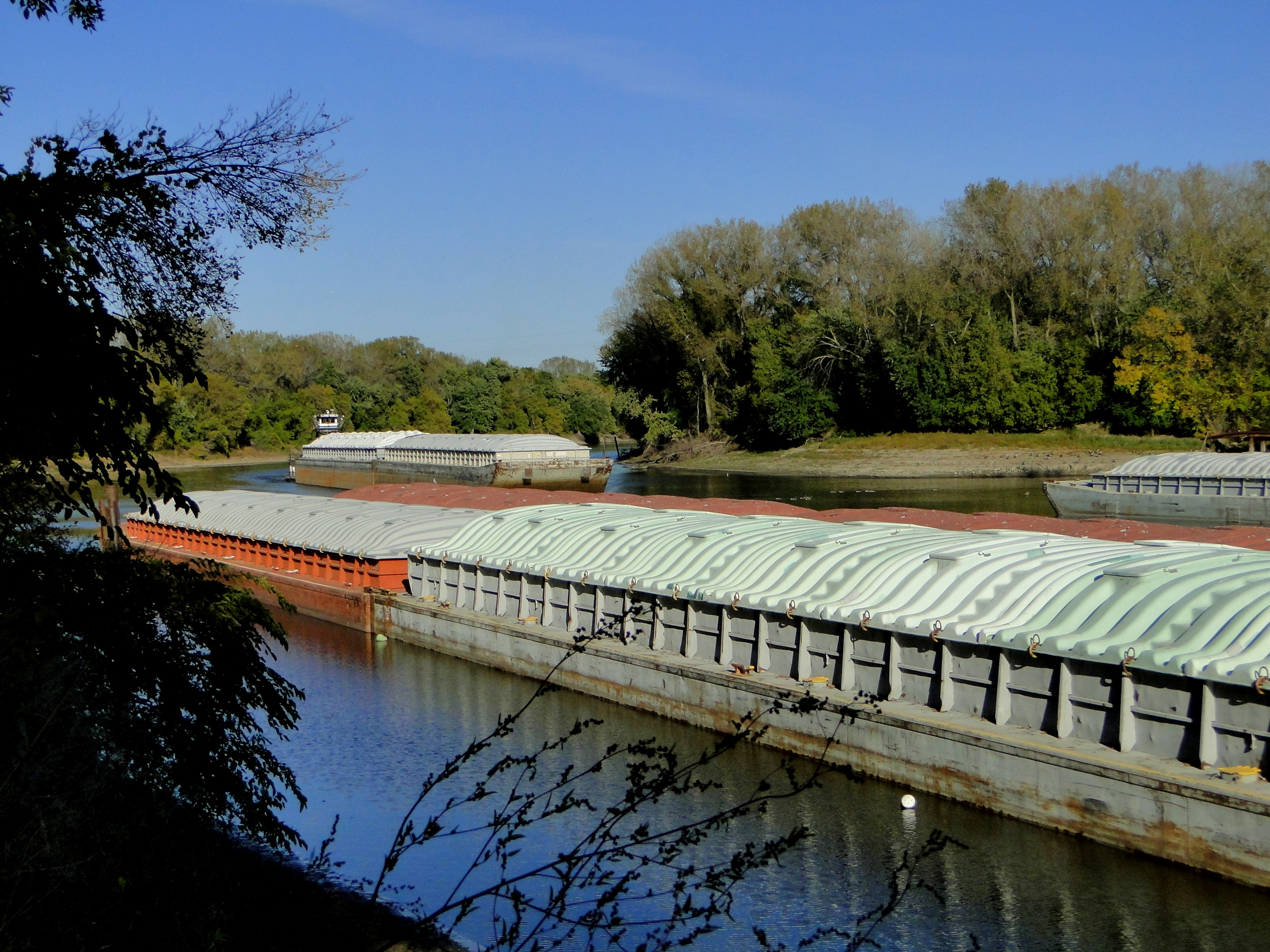
The towboat J.L. Fleming brings empty grain barges into Port Cargill on the Minnesota River, a tributary of the Mississippi River.

The river valley is notable as the origin and center of the canning industry in Minnesota. In 1903 Carson Nesbit Cosgrove, an entrepreneur in Le Sueur, presided at the organizational meeting of the Minnesota Valley Canning Company (later renamed Green Giant). By 1930, the Minnesota River valley had emerged as one of the country's largest producers of sweet corn. Green Giant had five canneries in Minnesota in addition to the original facility in Le Sueur. Cosgrove's son, Edward, and grandson, Robert also served as heads of the company over the ensuing decades before the company was acquired by General Mills. Several docks for barges exist along the river. Farm grains, including corn, are transported to the ports of Minneapolis and Saint Paul, and then shipped down the Mississippi River.

== Tributaries ==
Principal tributaries of the Minnesota River
Order of entry	River	Location of confluence
11	Blue Earth River	West side of Mankato
6	Chippewa River	Montevideo
9	Cottonwood River	Southeast of New Ulm
13	Credit River	Scott County, just southeast of Minneapolis–Saint Paul
5	Lac qui Parle River	Lac qui Parle State Park, 10 mi (15 km) northwest of Montevideo
10	Little Cottonwood River	Cambria Township, 7 mi (11 km) southeast of New Ulm
1	Little Minnesota River	Big Stone Lake in Browns Valley
4	Pomme de Terre River	Marsh Lake in southwestern Swift County, 4 mi (6 km) southwest of Appleton
8	Redwood River	Near Redwood Falls
12	Rush River	2.9 mi north of Le Sueur
2	Whetstone River	Ortonville, near the South Dakota state line
3	Yellow Bank River	Agassiz Township, 3 mi (5 km) southeast of Odessa
7	Yellow Medicine River	Upper Sioux Agency State Park in Sioux Agency Township

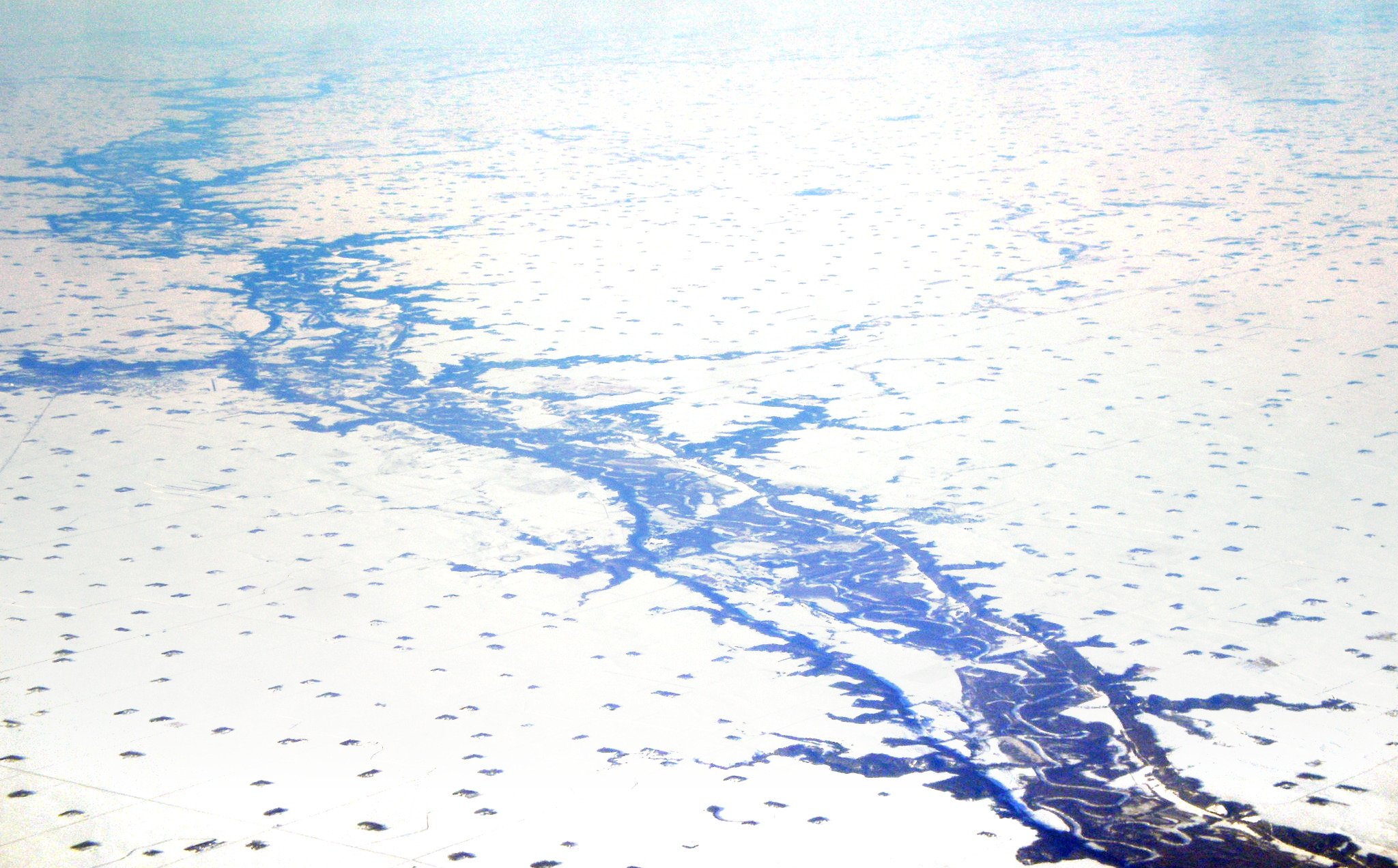
The Minnesota River Valley and tributaries as seen from the air at Redwood Falls, Minnesota. The river occupies only a small portion of the wide valley carved by the Glacial River Warren.

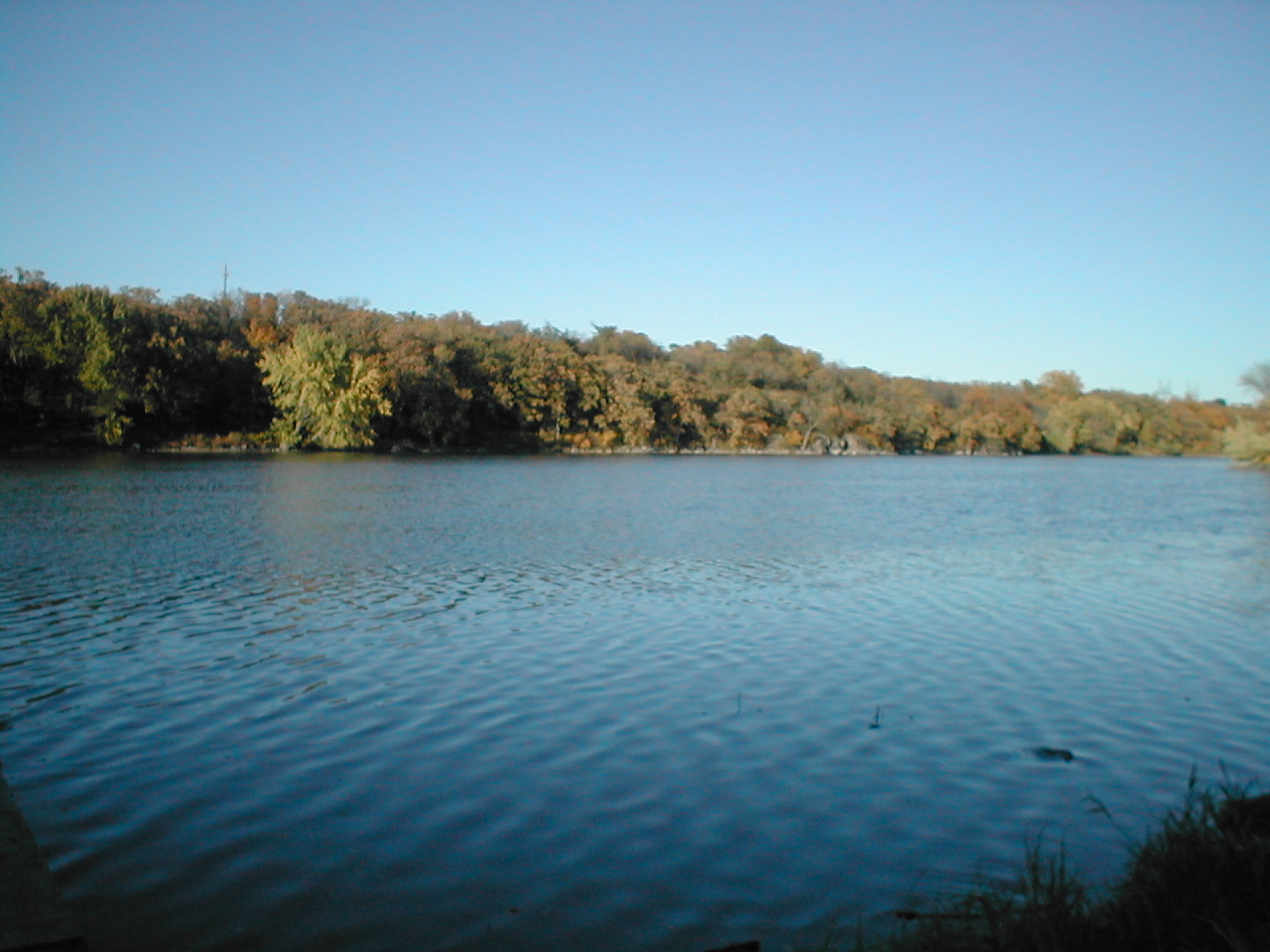
View of the Minnesota River from Memorial Park; southeast of Granite Falls, MN.

== Cities and towns ==
- Belle Plaine
- Bloomington
- Burnsville
- Carver
- Chanhassen
- Chaska
- Courtland
- Eagan
- Eden Prairie
- Franklin
- Granite Falls
- Henderson
- Kasota
- Le Sueur
- Mankato
- Mendota
- Mendota Heights
- Montevideo
- Morton
- New Ulm
- North Mankato
- Odessa
- Ortonville
- St. Paul
- St. Peter
- Savage
- Shakopee

== See also ==
- List of Minnesota rivers
- List of crossings of the Minnesota River
- Minnesota Valley (disambiguation)

== General and cited references ==
- "Place Names in the Minnesota River Basin". Mankato, MN: Minnesota River Basin Data Center, Minnesota State University.
- Sansome, Constance Jefferson (1983). Minnesota Underfoot: A Field Guide to the State's Outstanding Geologic Features. Stillwater, MN: Voyageur Press. ISBN 0-89658-036-9.
- Waters, Thomas F. (1977). The Streams and Rivers of Minnesota. Minneapolis: University of Minnesota Press. ISBN 0-8166-0960-8.
