= List of crossings of the Minnesota River =

The following is a list of crossings of the Minnesota River. The Minnesota River is a tributary of the Mississippi River, approximately 332 miles (534 km) long, in the U.S. state of Minnesota. It drains a watershed of nearly 17,000 square miles (44,000 km^{2}), 14,751 square miles (38,200 km^{2}) in Minnesota and about 2,000 sq mi (5,200 km^{2}) in South Dakota and Iowa. It rises in southwestern Minnesota, in Big Stone Lake on the Minnesota–South Dakota border just south of the Laurentian Divide at the Traverse Gap portage. It flows southeast to Mankato, then turns northeast. It joins the Mississippi south of the Twin Cities of Minneapolis and St. Paul, near the historic Fort Snelling.

== Crossings ==
Crossing	Carries	Location	Coordinates
Fort Snelling Park Foot Bridge	Hiking trail	Fort Snelling State Park	44°53′27″N 93°10′40″W
Mendota Bridge	MN 55 / MN 62	Fort Snelling and Mendota	44°53′14″N 93°10′39″W
I-494 Minnesota River Bridge	I-494	Bloomington and Mendota Heights	44°51′44″N 93°12′10″W
Cedar Avenue Bridge	MN 77	Bloomington and Eagan	44°49′38″N 93°13′53″W
Old Cedar Avenue Bridge	Former MN 36	Bloomington	44°49′48″N 93°14′28″W
I-35W Minnesota River bridge	I-35W	Bloomington and Burnsville	44°48′1″N 93°17′24″W
Dan Patch Line Bridge	Canadian Pacific	Bloomington and Savage	44°47′24″N 93°21′8″W
Bloomington Ferry Trail Bridge	Bloomington Ferry Bicycle Trail (formerly US 169)	Bloomington and Shakopee	44°47′55″N 93°23′15″W
Bloomington Ferry Bridge	US 169	Bloomington and Shakopee	44°47′55″N 93°23′56″W
Shakopee Bridge	CSAH 101 / CSAH 101 (formerly MN 101)	Shakopee and Chanhassen	44°48′2″N 93°31′33″W
Holmes Street Bridge	Pedestrian trail (formerly US 169 / MN 101)	Shakopee and Chanhassen	44°48′1″N 93°31′38″W
Chaska Bridge	MN 41	Chaska	44°46′58″N 93°35′57″W
Quaker Avenue Bridge	CSAH 9 / CSAH 11	Jordan	44°41′34″N 93°38′32″W
Belle Plaine Bridge	MN 25	Belle Plaine	44°37′59″N 93°45′57″W
Blakeley Bridge	CSAH 1 / CSAH 5	Blakeley	44°36′48″N 93°51′24″W
Bridge No. 40001	MN 19	Henderson	44°31′46″N 93°54′2″W
Bridge No. 40008	US 169	Le Sueur	44°28′51″N 93°54′14″W
Le Sueur Bridge	MN 93	Le Sueur	44°27′43″N 93°55′3″W
Traverse des Sioux	Ford	Traverse Township	44°21′24″N 93°57′12″W
Broadway Bridge	MN 99	St. Peter	44°19′29″N 93°57′11″W
Bridge No. 40002	MN 22	St. Peter	44°18′27″N 93°57′36″W
Highway 14 Bridge	US 14 / MN 60	Mankato	44°11′29″N 94°0′35″W
Veterans Memorial Bridge	Belgrade Avenue	Mankato	44°10′9″N 94°0′12″W
Northstar Bridge	US 169 / MN 60	Mankato	44°9′55″N 94°1′2″W
County 23 / County 42 Bridge	CSAH 23 / CSAH 42	Judson	44°12′1″N 94°11′40″W
Courtland Bridge	CSAH 24 / CSAH 45	Courtland	44°15′27″N 94°20′30″W
DM&E Railway Bridge	Dakota, Minnesota and Eastern Railroad	New Ulm	44°17′8″N 94°24′53″W
20th Street Bridge	CSAH 37	New Ulm	44°17′49″N 94°26′1″W
Bridge No. 9200	US 14 / MN 15	New Ulm	44°19′29″N 94°27′13″W
County 13 / County 14 Bridge	CSAH 13 / CSAH 14	New Ulm	44°21′42″N 94°29′53″W
Highway 4 Bridge	MN 4	Home and Ridgely Townships	44°26′1″N 94°43′2″W
Petersen Bridge	CSAH 3 / CSAH 8	Camp and Eden Townships	44°28′59″N 94°49′37″W
County 5 / County 11 Bridge	CSAH 5 / CSAH 11	Franklin	44°31′2″N 94°53′4″W
Minnesota Valley Railroad Bridge	Minnesota Prairie Line Railroad	Morton	44°32′47″N 94°59′23″W
US-71 Bridge	US 71 / MN 19	Morton	44°32′44″N 94°59′42″W
County 1 / County 101 Bridge	CSAH 1 / CSAH 101	North Redwood	44°34′18″N 95°5′51″W
County 21 / County 17 Bridge	CSAH 21 / CSAH 17	Flora and Delhi Townships	44°37′11″N 95°10′40″W
County 6 Bridge	CSAH 6 / CSAH 6	Flora and Delhi Townships	44°39′9″N 95°13′33″W
County 12 / County 19 Bridge	CSAH 12 / CSAH 19	Sacred Heart and Swedes Forest Townships	44°39′57″N 95°17′51″W
County 9 / County 7 Bridge	CSAH 9 / CSAH 7	Sacred Heart and Swedes Forest Townships	44°41′43″N 95°20′24″W
County 10 / County 21 Bridge	CSAH 10 / CSAH 21	Sacred Heart and Sioux Agency Townships	44°43′53″N 95°25′15.5″W
Bridge No. 12000	US 212	Granite Falls	44°48′19″N 95°32′38″W
Roebling Suspension Bridge	Pedestrian walkway	Granite Falls	44°48′36″N 95°32′14″W
Oak Street Bridge	CSAH 22 / CSAH 38	Granite Falls	44°48′44″N 95°32′7″W
BNSF Railroad Bridge	BNSF Railway	Granite Falls	44°49′23″N 95°33′35″W
Bridge No. 87573	CSAH 7 / CSAH 7	Wegdahl	44°53′28″N 95°39′4″W
Bridge No. 12009	US 212	Montevideo	44°54′12″N 95°41′7″W
Bridge No. 87021	US 59 / US 212	Montevideo	44°55′58″N 95°43′59″W
Bridge No. 6610	CSAH 15 / CSAH 18	Sparta and Camp Release Townships	44°57′38.5″N 95°48′39″W
Bridge No. 6611	CSAH 14 / CSAH 20	Tunsberg and Camp Release Townships	44°59′34.5″N 95°50′3″W
Lac qui Parle Dam Bridge	CSAH 13 / CSAH 33	Kragero and Lac qui Parle Townships	45°1′19″N 95°52′9″W
Milan Bridge	MN 40	Milan	45°5′52″N 95°58′48″W
Twin Bridge	MN 119	Appleton and Hantho Townships	45°9′31″N 96°3′18″W
BNSF Railroad Bridge	BNSF Railway	Appleton and Hantho Townships	45°10′4″N 96°5′24″W
Cement Bridge	Township Road 156	Akron and Lake Shore Townships	45°12′12″N 96°11′47″W
Bridge No. 96952	Township Road 159	Odessa Township	45°14′25.5″N 96°17′15.5″W
Bridge No. 37009	US 75	Odessa and Agassiz Townships	45°14′57.5″N 96°17′33″W
Highway 75 Dam	Unnamed road	Big Stone National Wildlife Refuge	45°14′54.5″N 96°17′51.5″W
Bridge No. 37552	CSAH 19 / CSAH 15	Odessa	45°15′22″N 96°20′21″W
Auto Tour Route Bridge	CSAH 17	Big Stone National Wildlife Refuge	45°15′37″N 96°24′37.5″W
Minnesota Headwaters Trail Bridge (south)	Minnesota Headwaters Trail	Big Stone National Wildlife Refuge	45°16′3.5″N 96°25′40″W
Minnesota Headwaters Trail Bridge (north)	Minnesota Headwaters Trail	Ortonville Township	45°17′25.7″N 96°26′11.5″W
Old US 12 Bridge	Abandoned	Ortonville	45°17′43″N 96°26′39″W
US 12 Bridge	US 12	Ortonville	45°17′46″N 96°26′43″W
Big Stone Lake Dam	Pedestrian walkway	Ortonville	45°17′49″N 96°26′56″W
BNSF Railroad Bridge	BNSF Railway	Ortonville	45°17′56″N 96°27′0″W
Bridge No. 06501	CSAH 30	Ortonville	45°18′9″N 96°27′8″W
