= Yellow Bank =

Yellow Bank, Yellow Banks, or Yellowbanks may refer to:

- Yellow Bank, Brasil
- Yellow Bank, Indiana
- Yellow Bank Township, Minnesota
- Yellow Bank River in Minnesota and South Dakota
- Yellow Banks, Kentucky
- Yellowbanks, Indiana, an unincorporated community
- Yellowbanks, the James Alfred Roosevelt Estate, in New York
- Yellowbanks, Indiana- an unincorporated community and campground/recreational center
