= Shakopee Bridge =

- Coordinates: 44°48′02″N 93°31′33″W
- Carries: Four lanes of CR 101
- Crosses: Minnesota River
- Locale: Shakopee and Chanhassen, Minnesota, United States

History
- Opened: 1993

Location
- Interactive map of Shakopee Bridge

The Shakopee Bridge is a four-lane vehicular bridge crossing the Minnesota River between Chanhassen and downtown Shakopee. The bridge carries Scott County Road 101 (CR 101) traffic (formerly State Highway 101) across the bridge. This bridge opened in 1993, one city block downstream from a two-lane bridge it replaced.

The old two-lane bridge remains in place as a pedestrian/bicycle bridge. It is locally known as the Holmes Street Bridge and is listed on the National Register of Historic Places.

== Flooding ==
This bridge has been occasionally closed due to flooding north of the bridge. A sign north of the bridge displays the high-water marks of the 1965 and 1993 floods along the Minnesota River. In 2016, a new bridge that raises the elevation of County Road 101 north of the Shakopeee Bridge was completed, which will greatly reduce road closures due to flooding.

== See also ==
- List of crossings of the Minnesota River
