= Yellow Bank River =

River in the United States of America

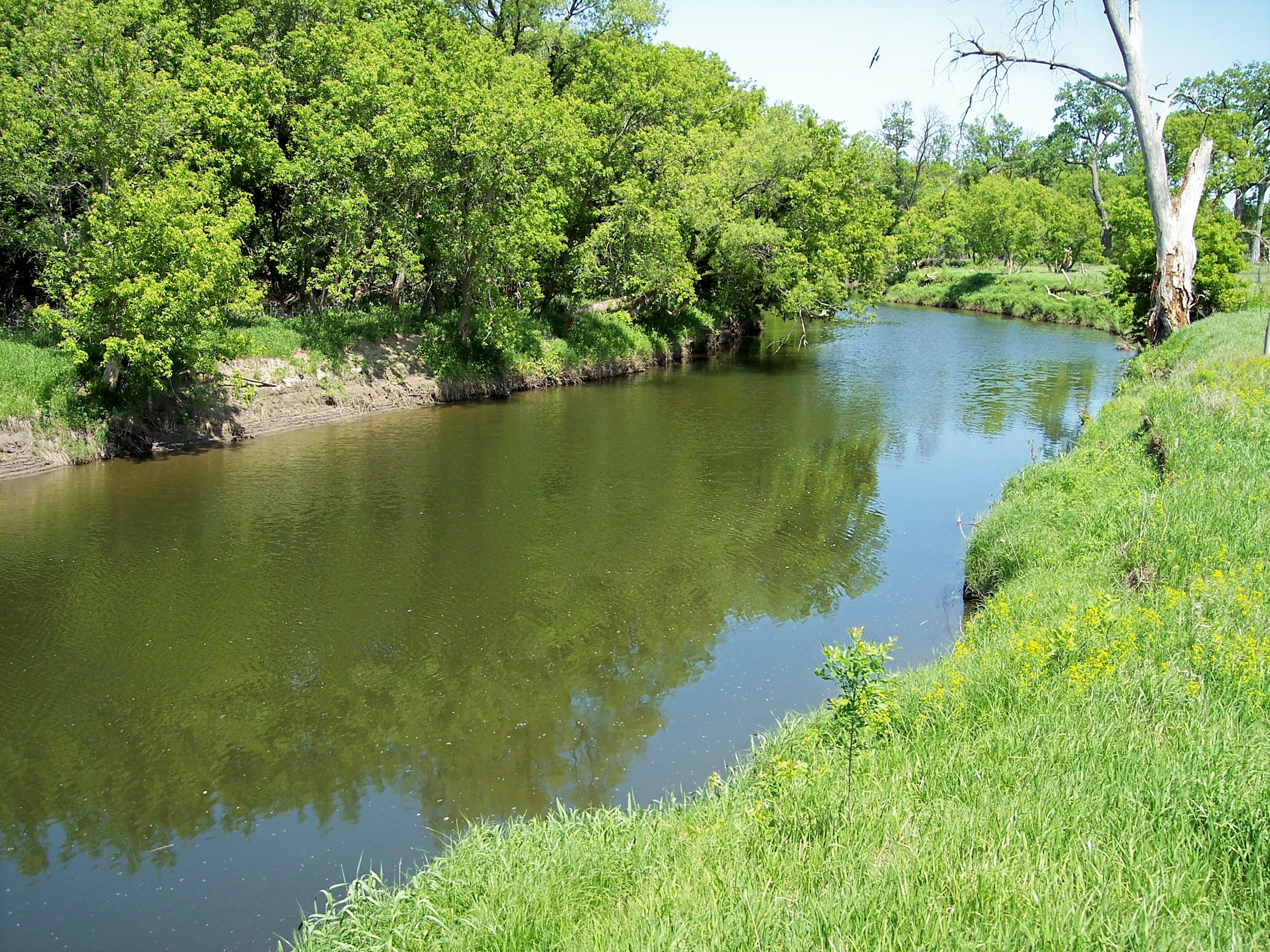
- The Yellow Bank River in the Big Stone National Wildlife Refuge in 2007

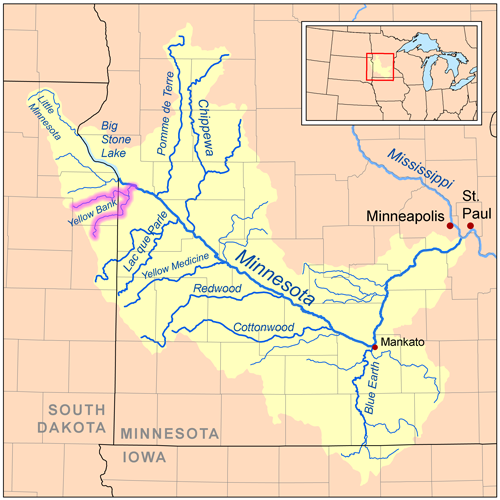
- Native name: Maḳazi Óze (Dakota)

Location
- Country: United States
- State: South Dakota, Minnesota

Physical characteristics
- Source: North Fork Yellow Bank River
  - location: Round Lake, Coteau des Prairies, Codington County, South Dakota
  - coordinates: 45°06′57″N 96°55′00″W
  - elevation: 1,838 ft (560 m)
- 2nd source: South Fork Yellow Bank River
  - location: Coteau des Prairies, Deuel County, South Dakota
  - coordinates: 44°58′17″N 96°48′09″W
  - elevation: 1,849 ft (564 m)
- Source confluence
  - location: Yellow Bank Township, Lac qui Parle County, Minnesota
  - coordinates: 45°10′47″N 96°21′29″W
  - elevation: 991 ft (302 m)
- Mouth: Minnesota River
  - location: Agassiz Township, Lac qui Parle County, Minnesota
  - coordinates: 45°14′12″N 96°17′11″W
  - elevation: 938 ft (286 m)
- Length: 12.0 mi (19.3 km)
- Basin size: 460 mi^{2} (1,200 km^{2})
- Discharge
  - location: Agassiz Township
  - average: 69.3 cu ft/s (1.96 m^{3}/s)
  - minimum: 0 cu ft/s (0 m^{3}/s)
  - maximum: 6,940 cu ft/s (197 m^{3}/s)

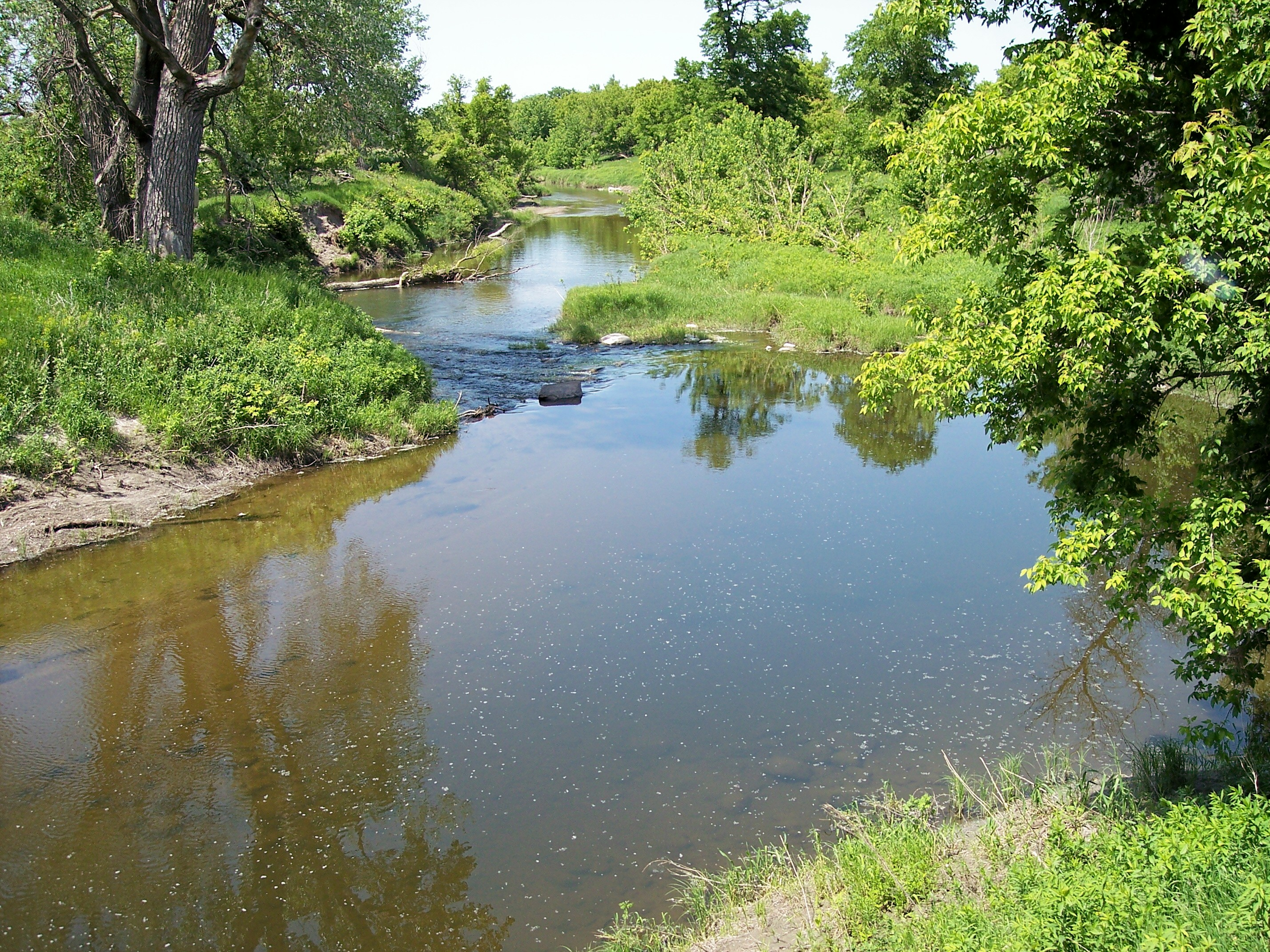
The Yellow Bank River in the Big Stone National Wildlife Refuge in 2007

The Yellow Bank River is a 12.0-mile-long (19.3 km) tributary of the Minnesota River in western Minnesota in the United States. It is formed by the confluence of two longer streams, the North Fork Yellow Bank River and the South Fork Yellow Bank River, which also flow in northeastern South Dakota. Via the Minnesota River, the Yellow Bank River is part of the watershed of the Mississippi River, draining an area of approximately 460 square miles (1,200 km^{2}) in an agricultural region.

The river was named for yellowish glacial drift in bluffs along the river. Its name was described as "Spirit Mountain Rivulet" by William Keating in his account of Stephen Harriman Long's expedition to the region in 1823 - possibly a reference to Big Tom Hill (known to the Dakota as Ḣe Waḳaƞ or "Spirit Mountain") which overlooks the north fork of the river. It was labelled as "Yellow Earth River" on an 1860 map of Minnesota. One historic Dakota language name for this river is Maḳazi Óze, which can be translated as "Where the Yellow Earth is Gathered".

== Geography ==
The river's north and south forks each rise in South Dakota on the Coteau des Prairies, a morainic plateau dividing the Mississippi and Missouri River watersheds, and flow across till plains into Minnesota. The north fork issues from Round Lake near South Shore in northeastern Codington County, South Dakota, and flows eastwardly for 57.3 miles (92.2 km) through central Grant County into northwestern Lac qui Parle County, Minnesota. The south fork rises in northwestern Deuel County, South Dakota, approximately six miles (9.7 km) southwest of Strandburg, and flows generally northeastwardly for 56.4 miles (90.7 km) through southern Grant County and western Lac qui Parle County, passing near the community of Nassau, Minnesota. From the confluence of the forks in Yellow Bank Township, Minnesota, the Yellow Bank River flows northwardly for its short course, passing through the Big Stone National Wildlife Refuge, and entering the Minnesota River in Agassiz Township, approximately 3 miles (5 km) southeast of Odessa. In the Big Stone refuge, the river flows among woodlands of American elm, ash, box elder, and silver maple, and may be fished.

== Flow rate ==
At the United States Geological Survey's stream gauge in Agassiz Township south of Odessa, 4.5 miles (7.2 km) upstream from the river's mouth, the annual mean flow of the river between 1940 and 2005 was 69.3 cubic feet per second (1.96 m^{3}/s). The highest recorded flow during the period was 6,940 cu ft/s (197 m^{3}/s) on April 9, 1969. Readings of zero were recorded on numerous days during several years.

== See also ==
- List of rivers of Minnesota
- List of rivers of South Dakota
