= I-35 bridge =

I-35 bridge may refer to:

- I-35W Mississippi River bridge, which collapsed in 2007
- I-35W Saint Anthony Falls Bridge, the replacement
- I-35W Minnesota River bridge in Burnsville
