= Holmes Street Bridge =

- U.S. National Register of Historic Places
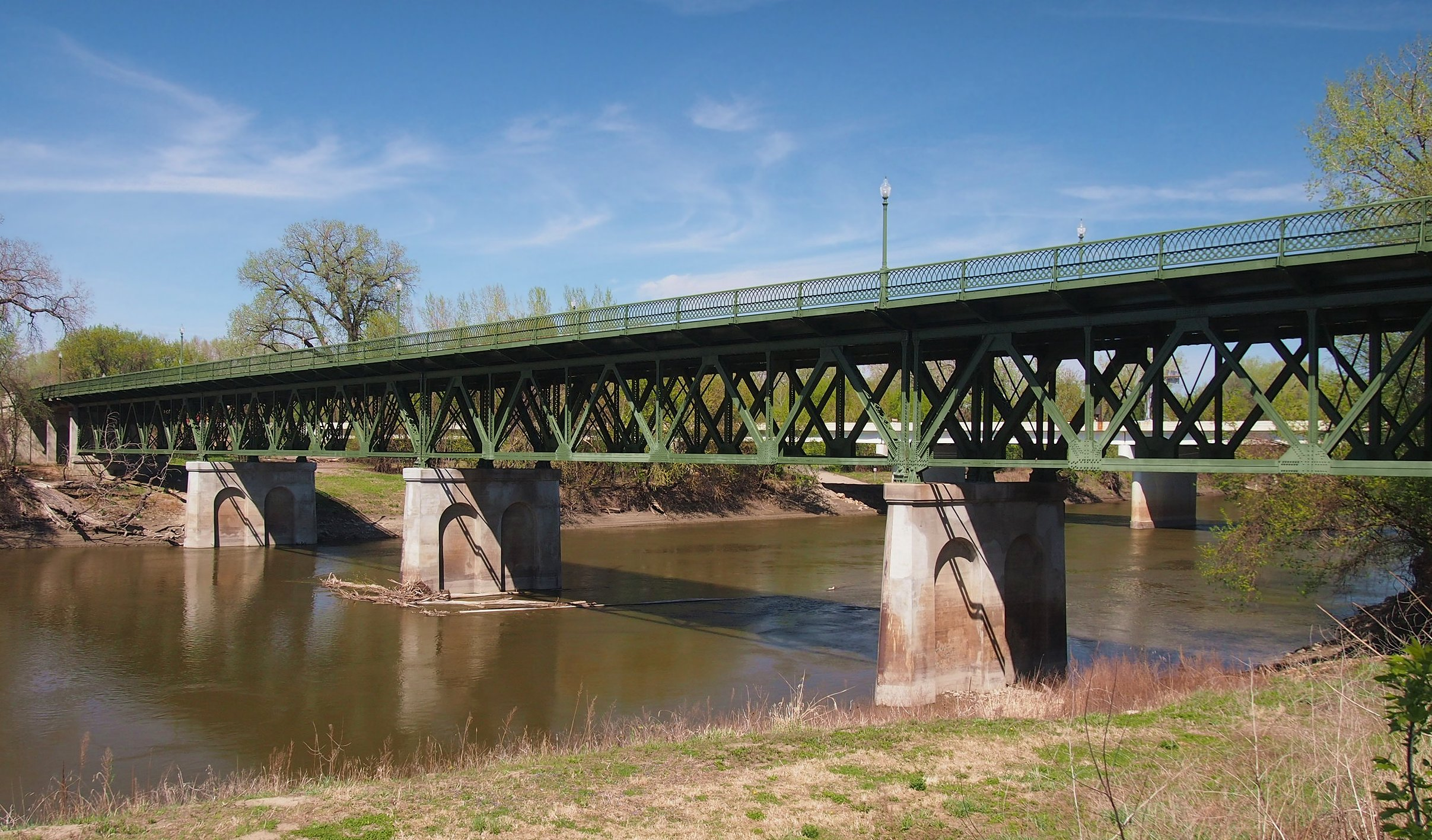
- The Holmes Street Bridge viewed from the southwest

- Location within Minnesota Location within the United States
- Location: Holmes Street over the Minnesota River, Shakopee, Minnesota
- Coordinates: 44°48′1″N 93°31′38″W
- Area: .68 acres (0.28 ha)
- Built: 1927
- Built by: Minneapolis Steel & Machinery Company, Widell Construction
- Architect: M.J. Hoffmann
- Architectural style: Warren-with-verticals deck truss
- MPS: Iron and Steel Bridges in Minnesota MPS
- NRHP reference No.: 10000414
- Designated: July 6, 2010

The Holmes Street Bridge, also known the Holmes Street Pedestrian Bridge, Old Shakopee Bridge, or Bridge 4175, is a historic truss bridge over the Minnesota River in Shakopee, Minnesota, United States. It is one of the state's only examples of a deck truss bridge. It was constructed in 1927 with parts manufactured by the Minneapolis Steel & Machinery Company. The bridge formerly carried US 169 and MN 101, and served as the principal river crossing for Shakopee. The Holmes Street Bridge was closed to vehicular traffic in 2005. It was rehabilitated in 2011 to carry a trail for pedestrians, cross-country skiers, and snowmobiles.

== Description ==
The Holmes Street Bridge is 645 feet (197 m) long and 42.4 feet (12.9 m) wide. The bridge has four spans over the river and two approach spans over land on either end. The load-bearing structure consists of three parallel Warren trusses, an unusual configuration as two parallel trusses were the norm. Neoclassical elements appear on the bridge piers, abutments, and parapet railings.

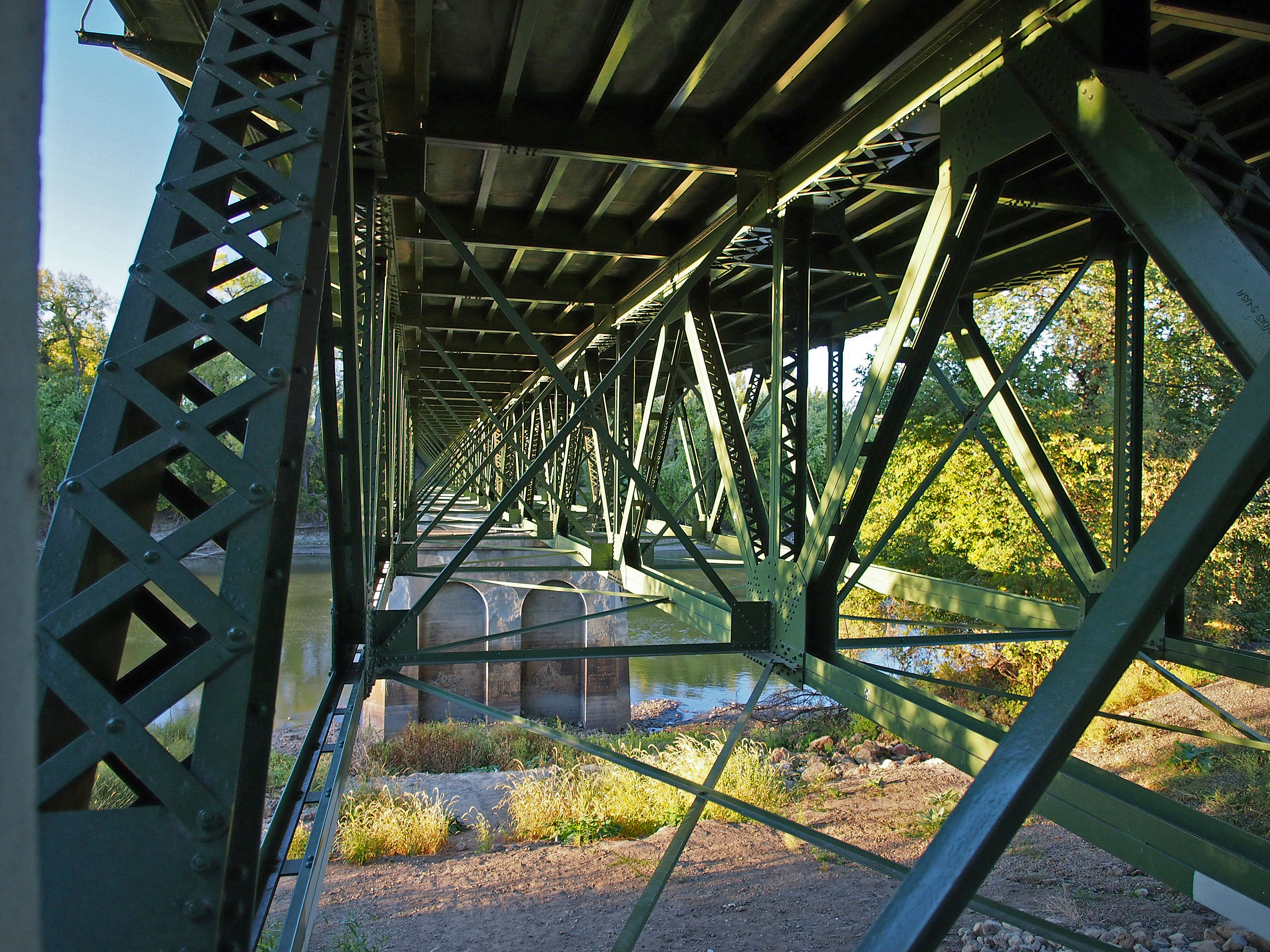
The bridge's trusses

== History ==
The bridge was built to carry Minnesota State Highway 5, locally known within Shakopee as Holmes Street. The route was later redesignated U.S. Route 169/State Highway 101. In 2009 a new bridge was built a block to the east to carry the highways.

A study from 1985 had identified only 10 deck truss bridges built in Minnesota before 1946. The Holmes Street Bridge is the only road bridge of that number still standing.

The bridge was listed on the National Register of Historic Places in 2010 for its state-level significance in the theme of engineering. It was nominated for its rare design type and its fabrication by an important Minnesota bridge manufacturer.

== See also ==
- List of crossings of the Minnesota River
- List of bridges on the National Register of Historic Places in Minnesota
- National Register of Historic Places listings in Scott County, Minnesota
