= Mendota Bridge =

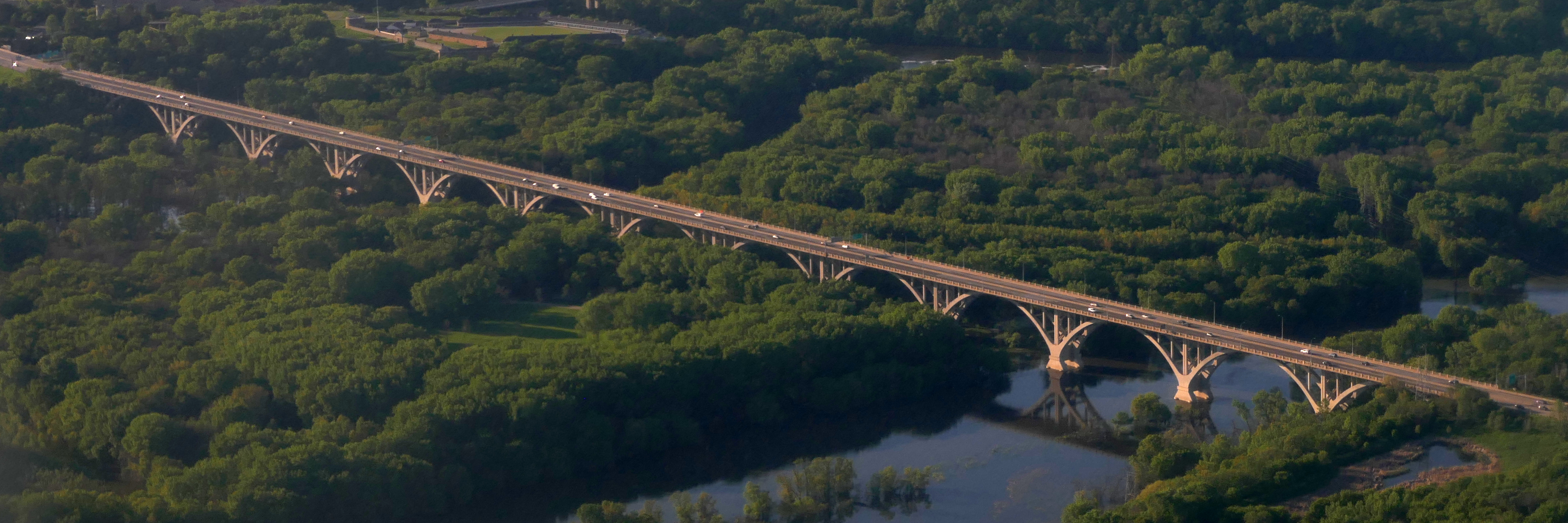
- Aerial view of the Mendota Bridge from the south.
- Coordinates: 44.887341°N 93.177564°W
- Carries: Four lanes of MN 55 / MN 62
- Crosses: Minnesota River
- Locale: Mendota Heights and Fort Snelling, Minnesota
- Maintained by: Minnesota Department of Transportation
- ID number: 4190

Characteristics
- Design: 13 arch spans
- Total length: 4,113 ft (1,254 m)
- Width: 71 ft (22 m)
- Longest span: 304 ft (93 m)
- Clearance below: 100 ft (30 m)

History
- Opened: 1926; 100 years ago, 1994; 32 years ago

Statistics
- Daily traffic: 39000 vehicles/day

Location
- Interactive map of Mendota Bridge

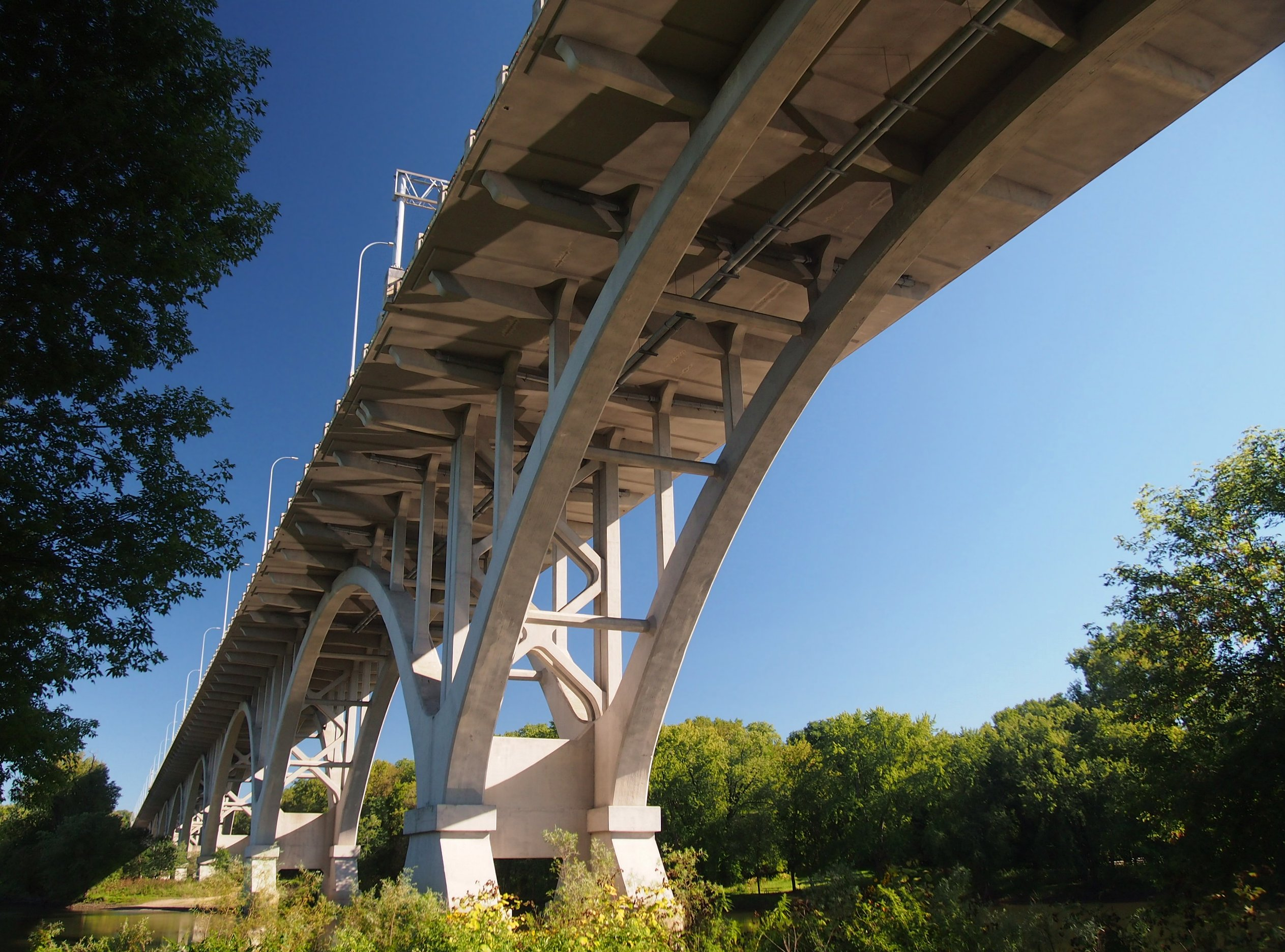
Underside of the bridge showing detail of the arches, spandrels, and deck

The Mendota Bridge (full name Fort Snelling–Mendota Bridge), in the US state of Minnesota carries State Highways 55 and 62 over the Minnesota River between Fort Snelling and Mendota Heights. It is the final bridge over the Minnesota River before the Minnesota flows into the Mississippi River at the "Meeting of the waters" or "Mendota" in the Dakota language. Traffic on the north end of the bridge may turn onto the Fort Road Bridge (MN 5) to cross the Mississippi River into Saint Paul, Minnesota. The skylines of both Minneapolis and Saint Paul can be seen simultaneously from the bridge.

== History ==
The structure was designed by C.A.P. Turner and Walter H. Wheeler. Turner also designed the Aerial Lift Bridge in Duluth, Minnesota, and the Liberty Memorial Bridge between Bismarck and Mandan, North Dakota.

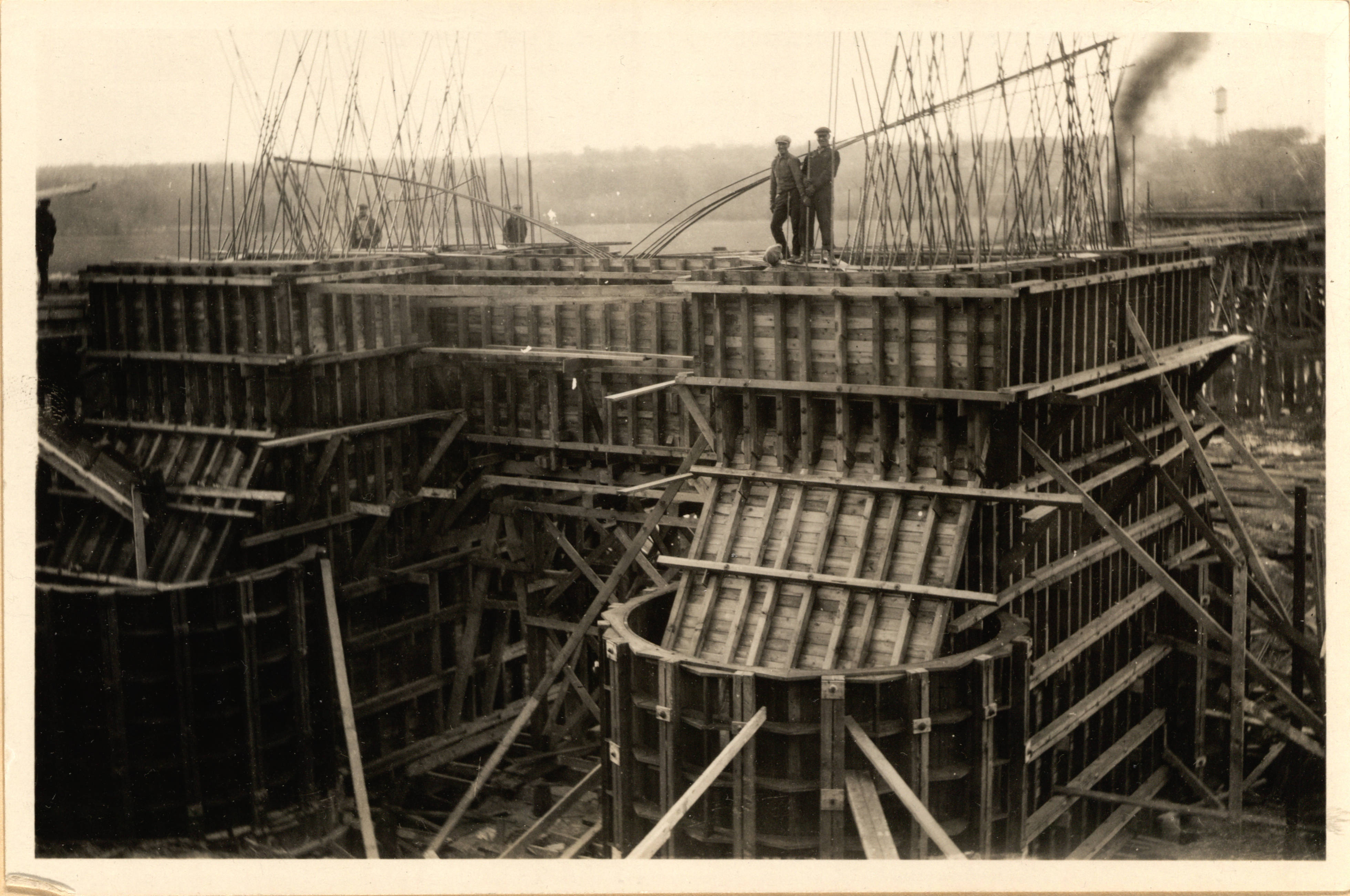
Mendota Bridge construction, 1925

The bridge is dedicated to the "Gopher Gunners", 151st Field Artillery who died in World War I.

It has a length of 4,113 feet (1,254 m) and was the longest continuous concrete arch bridge in the world when it was constructed in 1924–1926. It consists of 13 arches each 304 feet (93 m) wide. It was added to the National Register of Historic Places in 1979.

Between 1940 and 1965, the bridge also carried the concurrent designation of MN 100.

From 1992 to 1994, the old bridge was demolished down to the arches and rebuilt from the arches up with the new wider deck two feet (0.61 m) higher than the original. Spandrels and railings were also reconstructed.

From 2022 to 2024, a $7 million project on the bridge replaced damaged pavement, the lighting over the bridge, and the railings on the exterior sides of the bridge.

Railings on the bridge were 42 inches (1.1 m) tall from 1926 to 1994. The construction project ending in 1994 raised the railing height. The project ending in 2024 reduced the railing height back to 42 inches (1.1 m). The lower height meets AASHTO minimum height standards but does not meet MnDOT's minimum guidelines of 54 inches (1.4 m). Cyclists noticed the lowered railing height and a cycling advocacy organization, the Bicycle Alliance of Minnesota, shared concerns about the safety of pedestrians and bicyclists with the lowered railing height. In 2025, MnDOT announced plans to spend $2.5 million to raise the railings to meet their minimum standards of 54 inches (1.4 m).

== See also ==
- List of crossings of the Minnesota River
