= Bloomington Ferry Trail Bridge =

Pedestrian and bicycle bridge in Minnesota, United States

Coordinates: 44°47′55″N 93°23′15″W

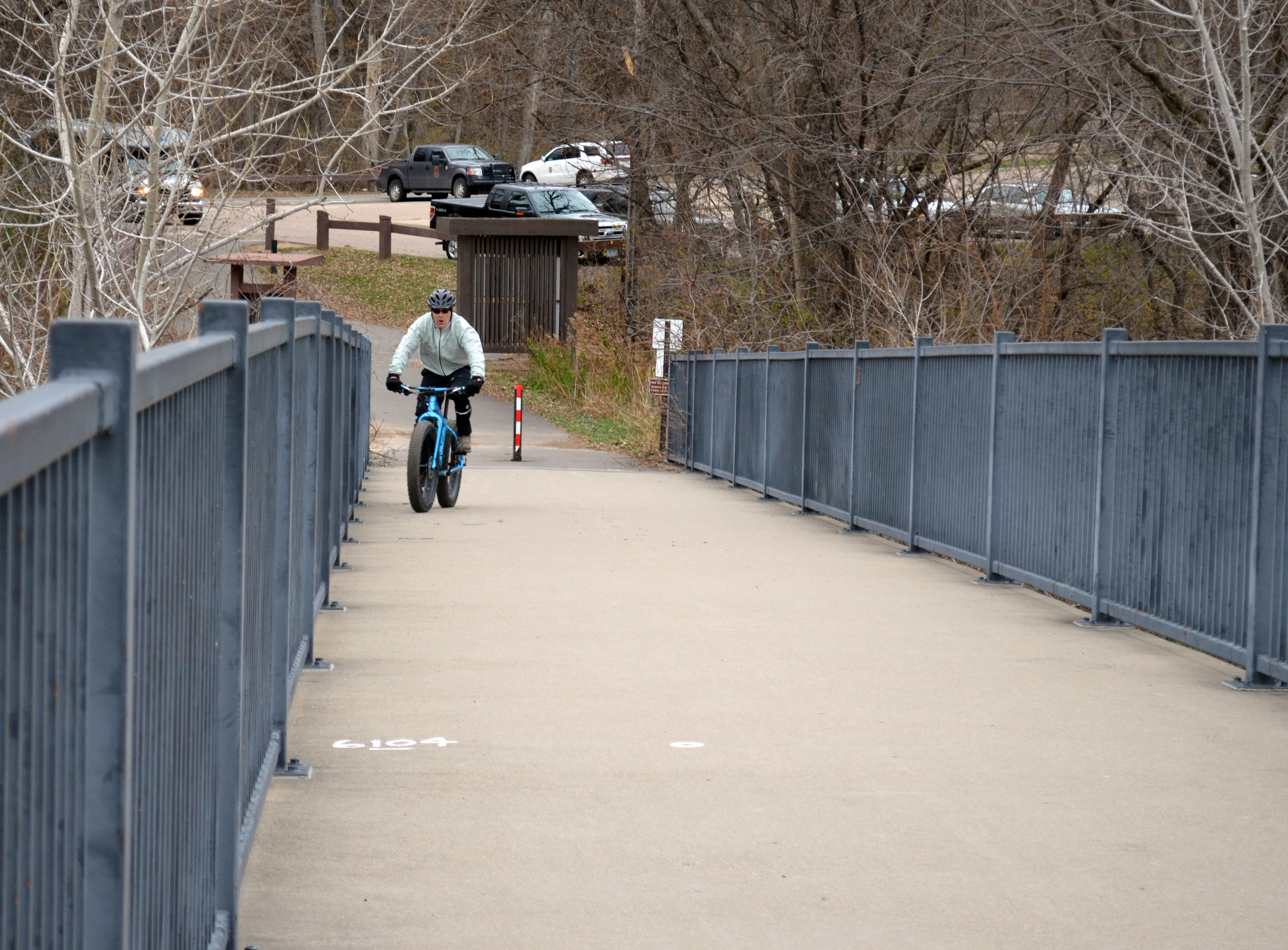

The Bloomington Ferry Trail Bridge is a bicycle trail / pedestrian bridge over the Minnesota River between Bloomington and Shakopee. It opened in 1998, replacing the old Bloomington Ferry Bridge, a 2-lane vehicle swing bridge demolished upon the completion of the new Bloomington Ferry Bridge approx. 3/4 mi. upstream in 1996.

== See also ==
- List of crossings of the Minnesota River
