= Cedar Avenue Bridge (Minnesota River) =

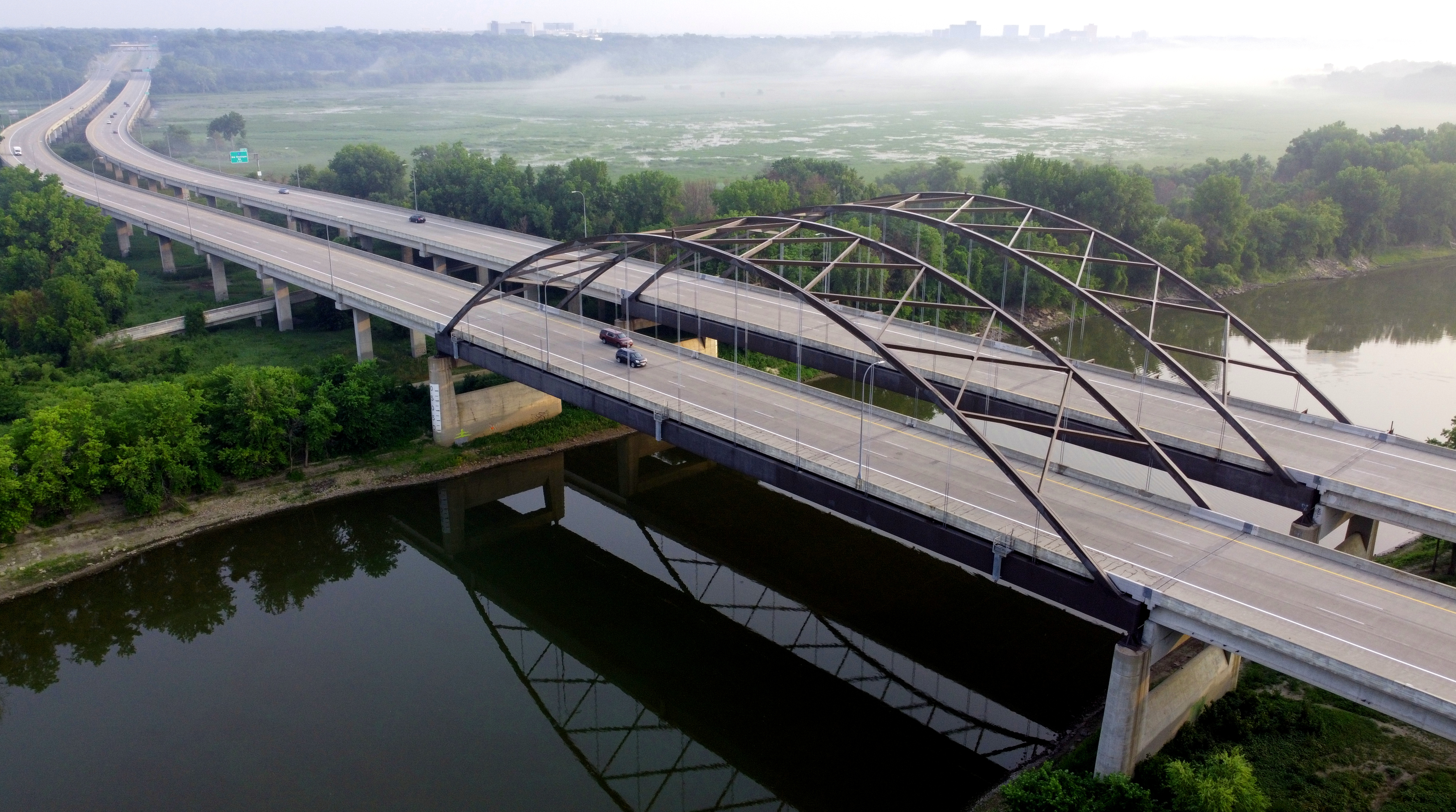
- Coordinates: 44.827340°N 93.231320°W
- Carries: 6 lanes of MN 77
- Crosses: Minnesota River
- Locale: Bloomington, Minnesota - Eagan, Minnesota, U.S.
- Maintained by: Minnesota Department of Transportation
- ID number: 9600N (northbound); 9600S (southbound)

History
- Opened: 1979

Location
- Interactive map of Cedar Avenue Bridge

The Cedar Avenue Bridge carries Minnesota State Highway 77 across the Minnesota River between the Minneapolis-St. Paul suburbs of Bloomington and Eagan, Minnesota. The two parallel crossings for northbound and southbound lanes are respectively 5,159 feet (1,572 m) and 5,185 feet (1,580 m) in length. It was built in 1979, superseding an older swing bridge by the same name that was composed of low-lying truss segments. The modern bridge has three lanes in each direction, in addition to a shoulder which is often used by buses to get past traffic slowdowns.

== Old bridge ==
- Long Meadow Bridge
- U.S. National Register of Historic Places
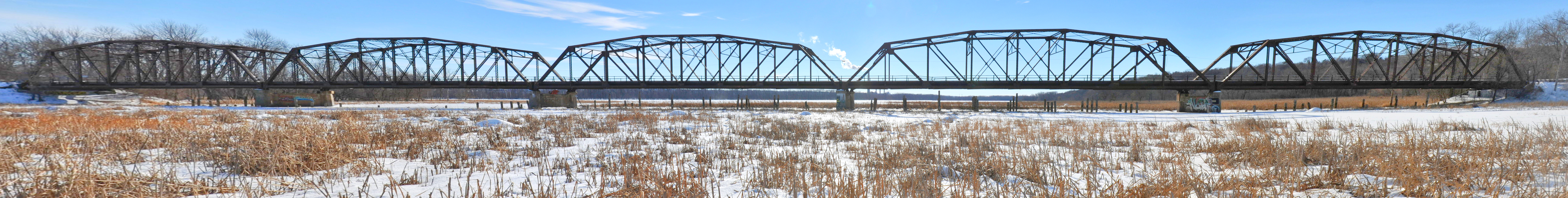
- The Long Meadow/Old Cedar Avenue Bridge in January 2014
- Location: Bloomington
- Built: 1920
- NRHP reference No.: 13000324
- Added to NRHP: 5/28/2013

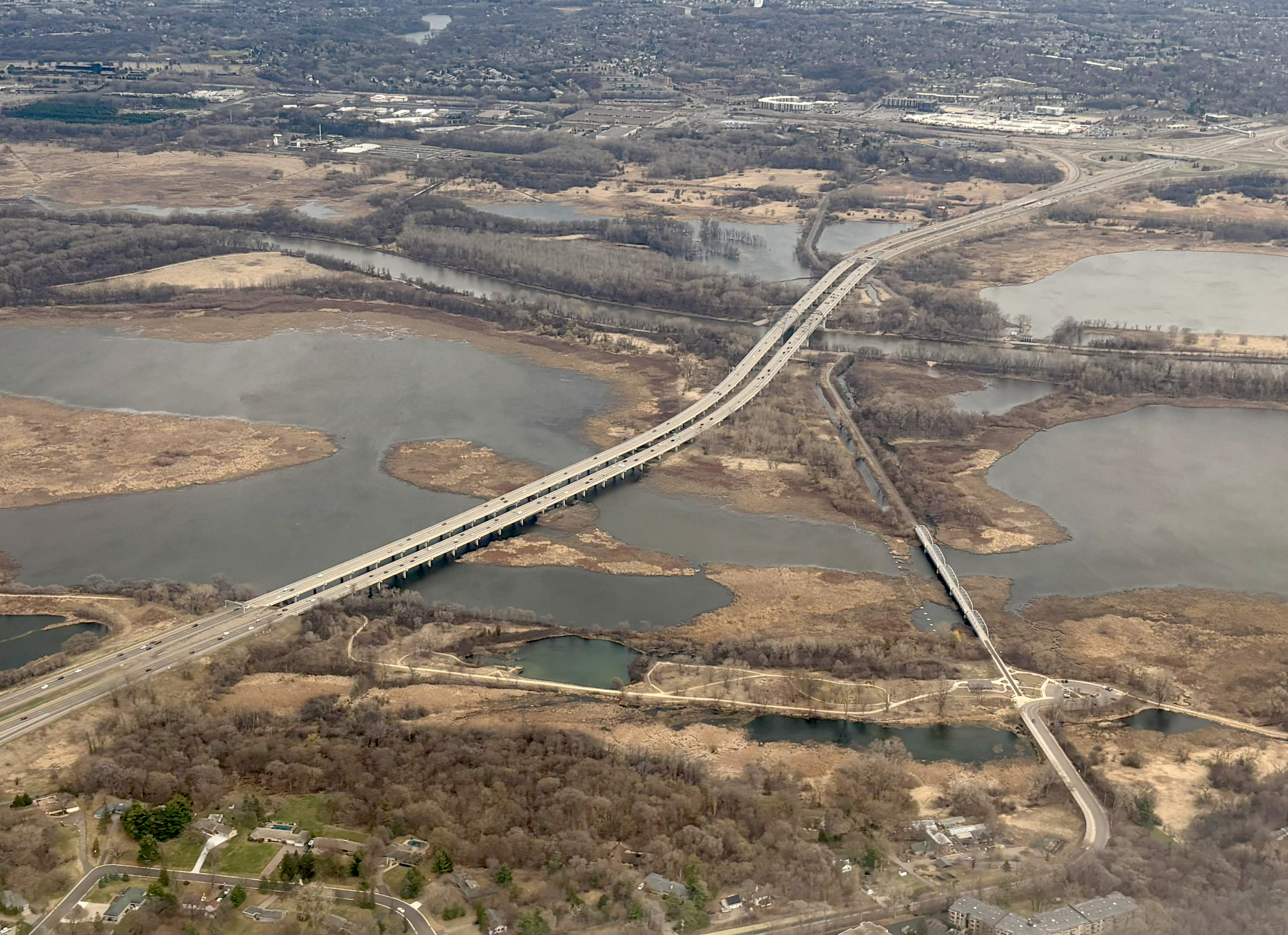
Both Cedar Ave bridges, old bridge on right

The original Old Cedar Avenue Bridge, also known as the Long Meadow Bridge, was built in 1890. The bridge that stands now was built in 1920 and carried automobile traffic into the 1990s. Back when the old structure was the main crossing, heavy traffic delays would occur because of the bridge's small size and the need to operate the swing segment to let boat traffic pass.

The narrow span continued operation as a bicycle trail until 2002 when it was deemed too unsafe. In 2008, $2 million in state funding was approved to reopen the bridge to bicyclists and pedestrians. In 2013, the bridge was added to the National Register of Historic Places, and the restored bridge opened to the public on October 14, 2016.

== See also ==
- 10th Avenue Bridge — crosses the Mississippi River in Minneapolis, once called the "Cedar Avenue Bridge"
- List of crossings of the Minnesota River
