= Betty Adkins =

American politician (1934–2001)

Betty A. Adkins
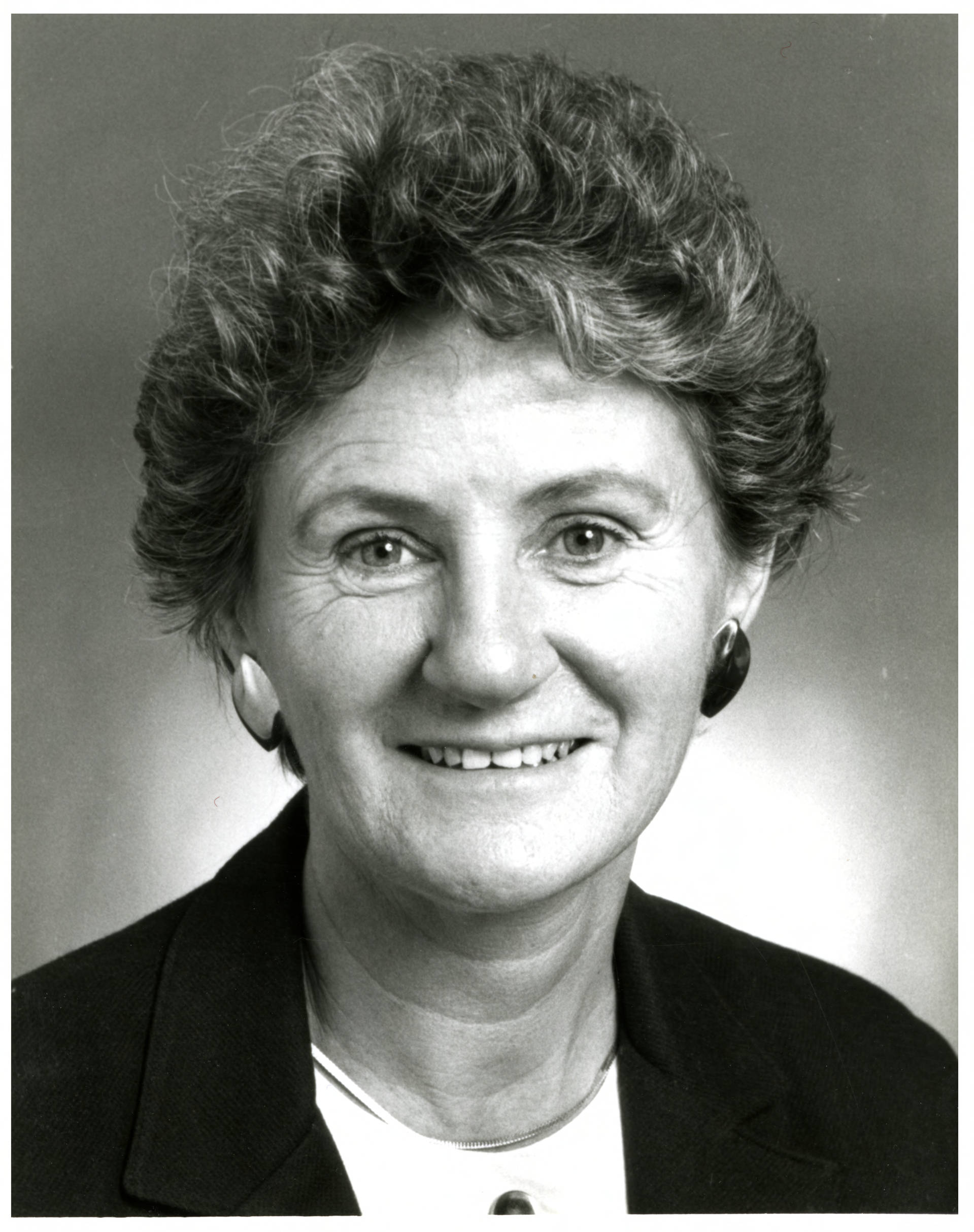
- Adkins in 1991

Minnesota State Senator
- In office 1983–1995
- Preceded by: John Bernhagen
- Succeeded by: Mark Ourada

Personal details
- Party: Democratic Farmer Laborer
- Spouse: Wallace "Wally" Adkins
- Children: 6

Betty A. Adkins (June 4, 1934 – October 29, 2001) was an American politician.

From St. Michael, Minnesota, Adkins went to North Hennepin Community College and University of Minnesota. Later she served on the Minnesota State Board of Examiners for Nursing Home Administrators, was on the Board of Adjustment for Wright County, and was a Certified Building Official for Otsego Township.

Adkins served in the Minnesota State Senate as the senator from District 22 (Hennepin and Wright counties) from 1983 to 1992, and District 19 (Sherburne and Wright counties) from 1993 to 1995. She was a member of the Minnesota Democratic–Farmer–Labor Party.

In early 1994 Adkins suffered a near-fatal car crash and announced her retirement from the state senate, planned for January 1, 1995. This triggered a special election on November 8, 1994, which brought Mark Ourada into the Senate to fill out the remaining two years of her term.

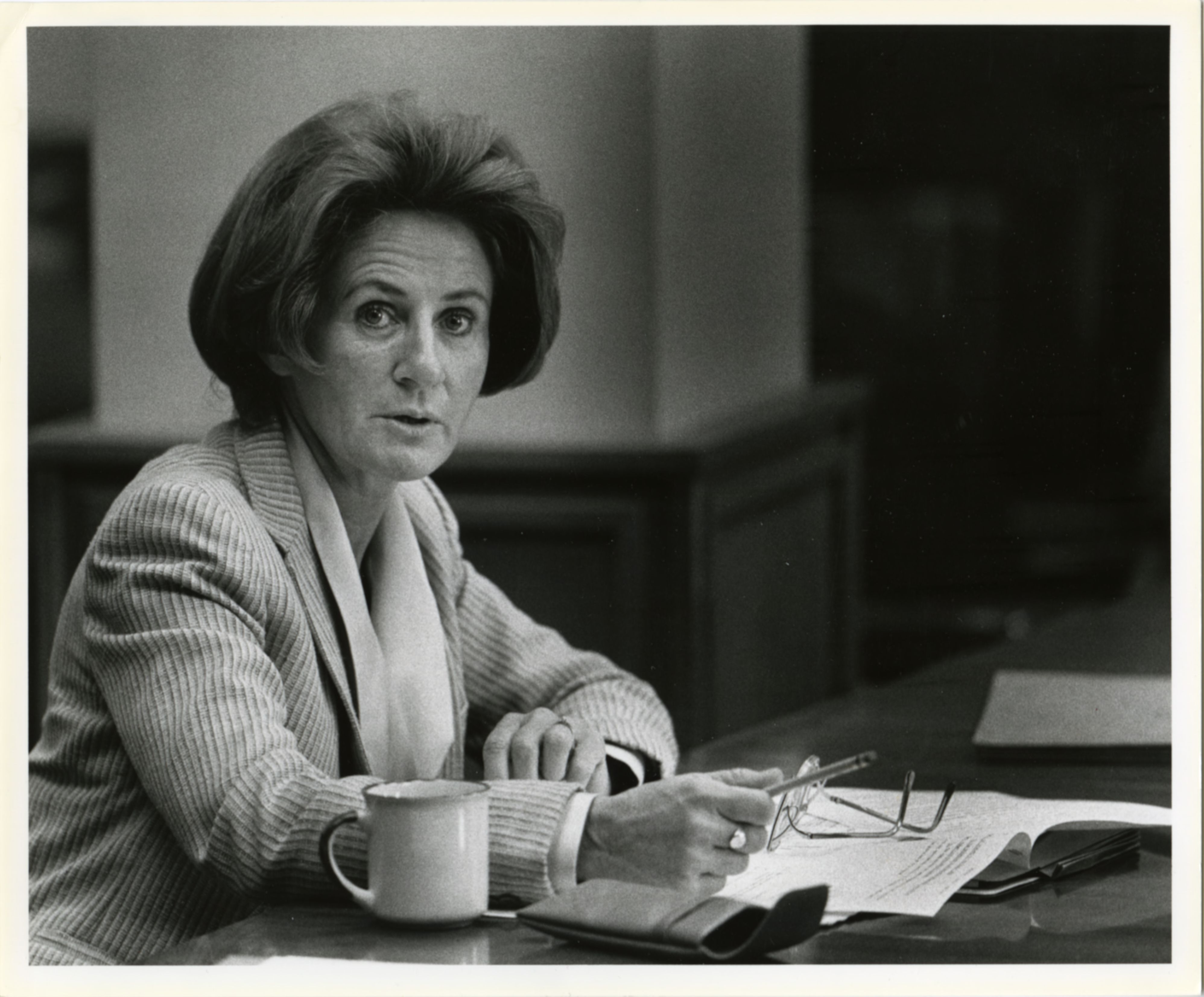
Senator Betty Adkins speaks in committee, St. Paul, Minnesota.

In 1995, the Minnesota Legislature designated the bridge that spans the Mississippi River between Otsego and Elk River the Betty Adkins Bridge.

She died in Buffalo, Minnesota on October 29, 2001, from Alzheimer's disease.
