= Traverse, Minnesota =

Traverse
- Unincorporated community
- Location within Minnesota Location within the United States
- Coordinates: 44°20′55″N 94°01′03″W
- Country: United States
- State: Minnesota
- County: Nicollet
- Township: Traverse Township
- Elevation: 991 ft (302 m)
- Time zone: UTC-6 (Central (CST))
  - Summer (DST): UTC-5 (CDT)
- ZIP code: 56082
- Area code: 507
- GNIS feature ID: 654978

Traverse is an unincorporated community in Traverse Township, Nicollet County, Minnesota, United States, near St. Peter. The community is located along Nicollet County Road 15, near its junctions with County Roads 19 (377th Avenue) and 40 (371st Avenue). The Traverse des Sioux Historic Site is nearby.

== History ==
Traverse was platted in 1852. The community's historical name, Travers des Sioux, is derived from French meaning "crossing of the Sioux". A post office called Travers des Sioux was established in 1853, the name was shortened to Traverse in 1896, and the post office closed in 1915.
