= Chaska Bridge =

Bridge in Chaska, Minnesota, US

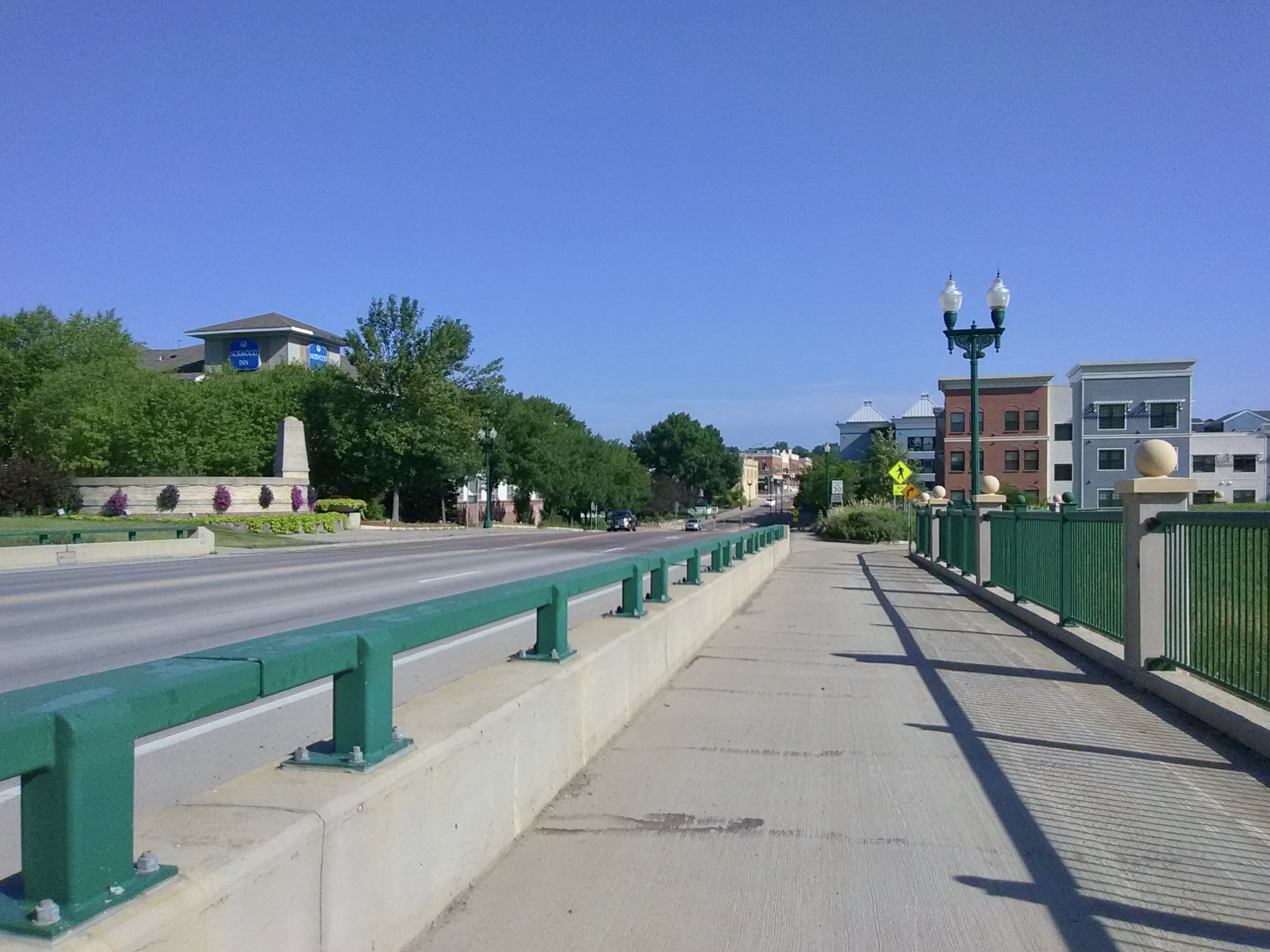
- MN 41 Chaska Bridge
- Coordinates: 44°46′58″N 93°35′57″W
- Carries: Minnesota State Highway 41
- Crosses: Minnesota River
- Locale: Chaska
- Named for: Chaska
- Preceded by: 2-lane bridge

Characteristics
- Total length: 508.0 feet (154.8 m)
- Width: 76.3 feet (23.3 m)
- Longest span: 170.0 feet (51.8 m)
- No. of spans: 4

History
- Construction end: 2007
- Opened: 7/1/07

Location
- Interactive map of Chaska Bridge

The Chaska Bridge is a 4-lane vehicular bridge crossing the Minnesota River on the south side of downtown Chaska, carrying Minnesota State Highway 41. It is 508 feet (155 m) long, and 76.3 feet (23.3 m) wide.

== History ==
When the former bridge was replaced, it was the second busiest two lane bridge in Minnesota (behind the Hastings High Bridge on US 61.) The replacement project allowed for two lanes open at a time by only building one half of the new bridge, and demolishing the old bridge, and then building the other half. Traffic went down the middle to polish off the permanent edges. The bridge had been decorated with the city of Chaska with murals, lighting, and stonework. Signs at each end displayed the city name. This bridge opened in mid-2006, and the project was finished in late 2007.

== See also ==
- List of crossings of the Minnesota River
