= Big Tom Hill =

Mountain in South Dakota, United States

Coordinates: 45°10′44.41″N 96°29′13.55″W

Big Tom Hill is a summit located in Grant County, South Dakota. Big Tom Hill is 3,805 feet (1,160 meters) above sea level. It is located approximately six miles east-southeast from Milbank and overlooks the Yellow Bank River.

The origin of the hill's English name is unknown, but it was known to the Dakota as Ḣe Waḳaƞ, which could be loosely translated as "Sacred Hill" or "Spirit Hill" though no direct English counterpart exists for the Dakota language word Waḳaƞ. Dakota narratives describe the hill as once having had boulder mosaics on it, though these can no longer be found in the present. Henry Hastings Sibley and his men briefly camped on this hill during his punitive 1863 expedition westward against the Dakota.
