= Bloomington Ferry Bridge =

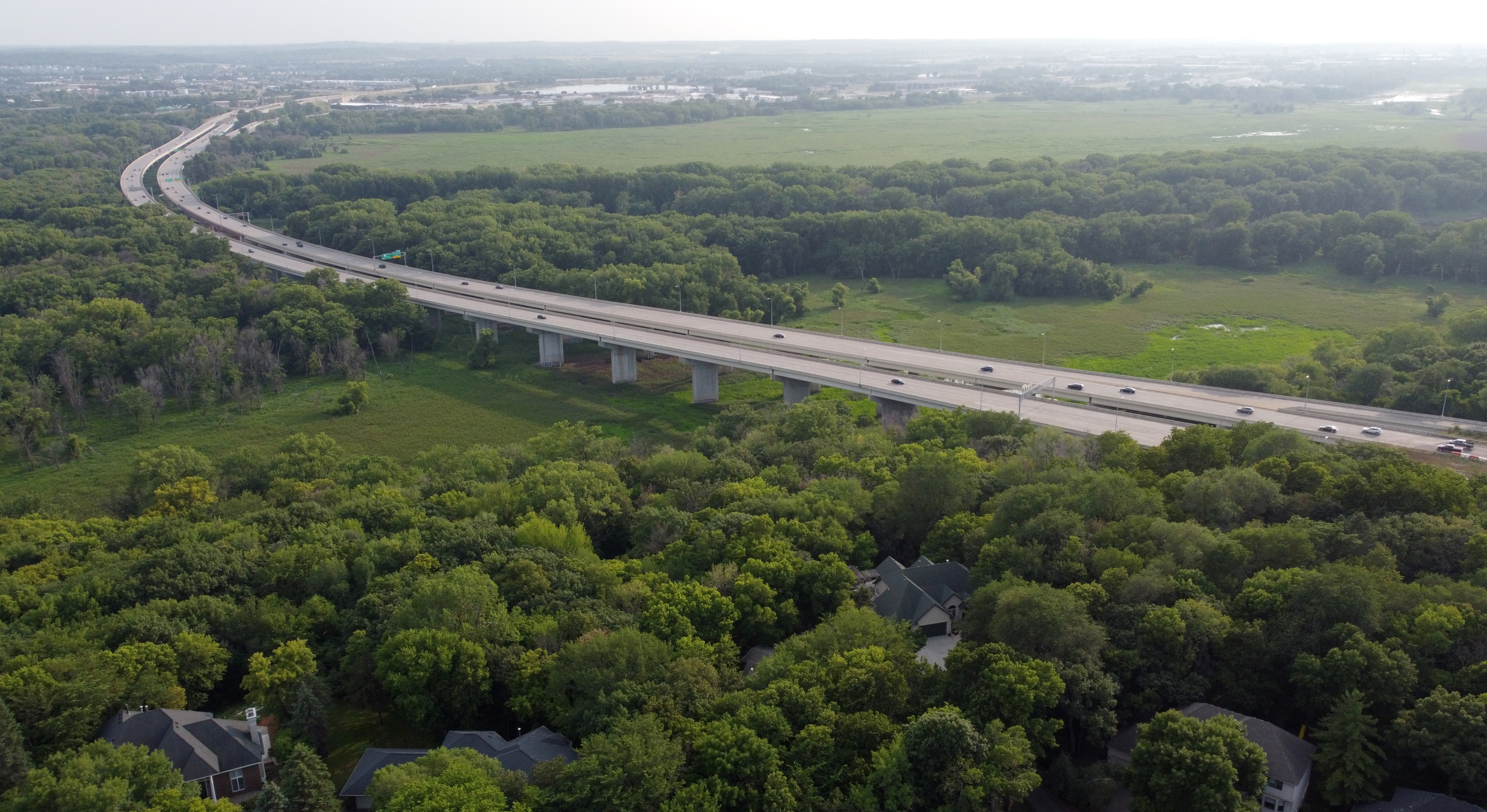
- Coordinates: 44°47′55″N 93°23′56″W
- Carries: US 169
- Crosses: Minnesota River
- Locale: Bloomington, Minnesota
- Named for: Bloomington Ferry
- ID number: 27624A and 27624B

Characteristics
- Total length: 1.1 miles (1.8 km)

History
- Construction end: 1996
- Replaces: Hennepin County Road 18

The Bloomington Ferry Bridge is a 1.1-mile-long (1.8 km) freeway bridge across the Minnesota River between Bloomington, Minnesota and Shakopee, Minnesota that carries U.S. Route 169 (US 169). The current bridge and the US 169 Shakopee Bypass were both completed in 1996. The bridge it replaced was designated Hennepin County Road 18 and Scott County Road 18.

== Bridge history ==
In 1849, the Bloomington Ferry began operation across the Minnesota River, providing service until the first Bloomington Ferry Bridge was built in 1889 at the site of the current Bloomington Ferry Trail Bridge. This bridge remained in service until the late 1970s, when the bridge was replaced by a temporary 2-lane vehicle bridge. This second bridge remained in service until the third and current bridge was built approx. 0.75 miles (1.21 km) upstream. This current bridge was built in 1996 to avoid the flooding issues that plagued the previous two bridges due to the road on the Scott County side of the bridge lying along the riverbank.

== See also ==
- List of crossings of the Minnesota River
