= Blakeley Township, Scott County, Minnesota =

Blakeley Township, Minnesota
- Township
- Location within the state of Minnesota Blakeley Township, Minnesota (the United States)
- Coordinates: 44°34′47″N 93°50′16″W
- Country: United States
- State: Minnesota
- County: Scott

Area
  - Total: 27.6 sq mi (71.5 km^{2})
  - Land: 26.9 sq mi (69.7 km^{2})
  - Water: 0.69 sq mi (1.8 km^{2})
- Elevation: 991 ft (302 m)

Population (2020)
  - Total: 408
- Time zone: UTC-6 (Central (CST))
  - Summer (DST): UTC-5 (CDT)
- Area codes: 952 and 507
- FIPS code: 27-06418
- GNIS feature ID: 0663612

Blakeley Township is a township in Scott County, Minnesota, United States. The population was 408 at the 2020 census.

Blakely Township was organized in 1874, and named after its largest settlement, Blakeley.

== Geography ==
According to the United States Census Bureau, the township has a total area of 27.6 square miles (71 km^{2}), of which 26.9 square miles (70 km^{2}) is land and 0.7 square miles (1.8 km^{2}) (2.50%) is water.

== Demographics ==
As of the census of 2000, there were 496 people, 166 households, and 132 families residing in the township. The population density was 18.4 inhabitants per square mile (7.1/km^{2}). There were 169 housing units at an average density of 6.3 per square mile (2.4/km^{2}). The racial makeup of the township was 97.58% White, 0.40% African American, 0.40% Asian, 0.60% from other races, and 1.01% from two or more races. Hispanic or Latino of any race were 2.02% of the population.

There were 166 households, out of which 37.3% had children under the age of 18 living with them, 68.7% were married couples living together, 4.8% had a female householder with no husband present, and 19.9% were non-families. 12.0% of all households were made up of individuals, and 6.0% had someone living alone who was 65 years of age or older. The average household size was 2.99 and the average family size was 3.33.

In the township the population was spread out, with 29.2% under the age of 18, 9.1% from 18 to 24, 29.4% from 25 to 44, 22.4% from 45 to 64, and 9.9% who were 65 years of age or older. The median age was 36 years. For every 100 females, there were 96.0 males. For every 100 females age 18 and over, there were 102.9 males.

The median income for a household in the township was $59,583, and the median income for a family was $64,375. Males had a median income of $39,375 versus $29,167 for females. The per capita income for the township was $22,530. About 4.1% of families and 3.6% of the population were below the poverty line, including none of those under age 18 and 20.5% of those age 65 or over.
