= Betty Adkins Bridge =

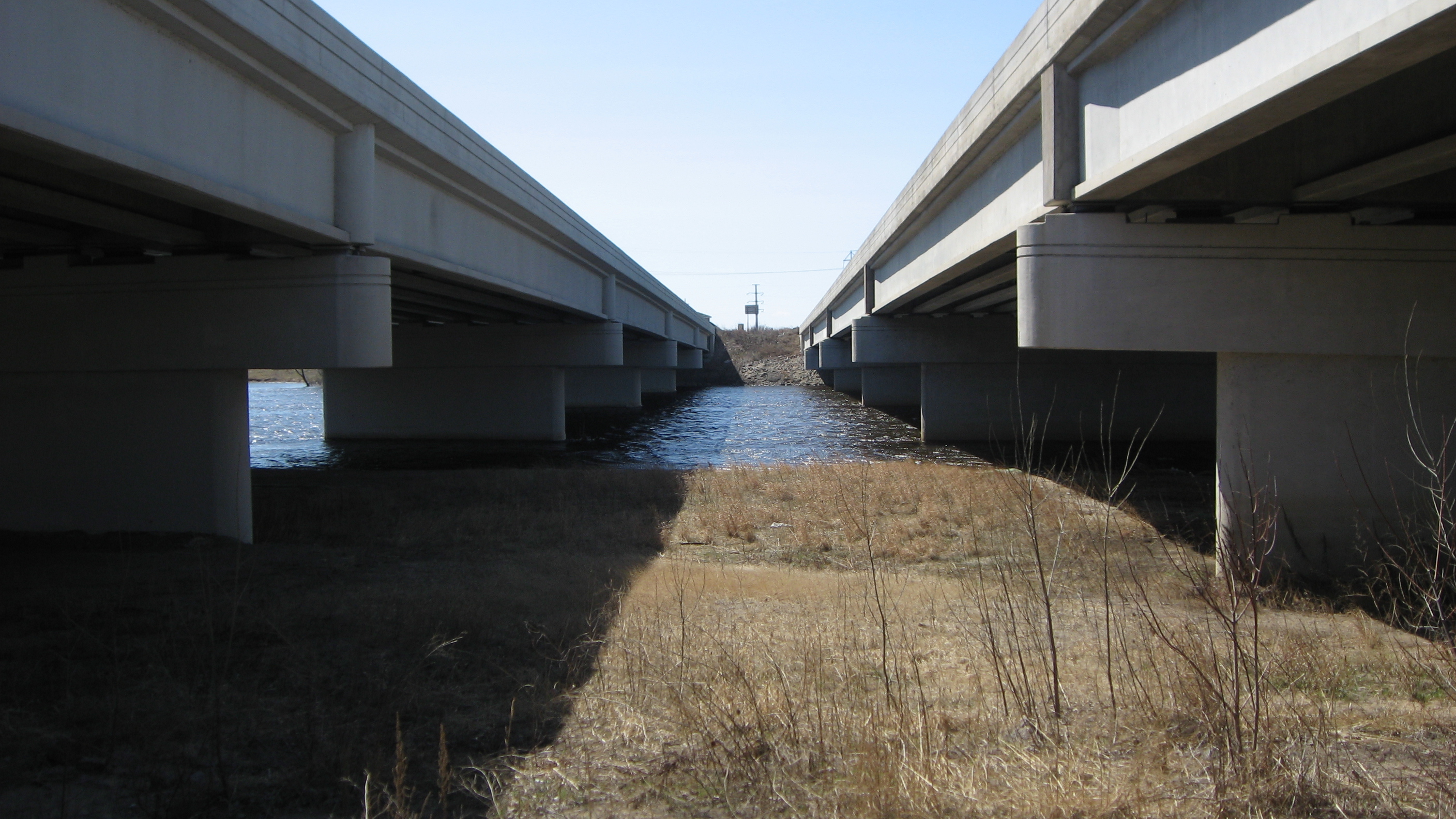
- Coordinates: 45°17′19″N 93°33′29″W
- Carries: Four lanes of MN 101
- Crosses: Mississippi River
- Locale: Elk River, Minnesota
- Maintained by: Minnesota Department of Transportation
- ID number: 86005 (southbound)

Characteristics
- Design: Plate girder bridge (northbound), concrete girder bridge (southbound)
- Total length: 708 feet
- Width: 45 feet (southbound)
- Longest span: 150 feet
- Clearance below: 32 feet

History
- Opened: 2001 (northbound), 1993 (southbound)

Statistics
- Daily traffic: 46,000

Betty Adkins Bridge is a pair of concrete girder bridges spanning the Mississippi River between Otsego, Minnesota and Elk River, Minnesota. The northbound bridge was built in 2001, replacing a plate girder bridge that was originally built in 1967 as a two-lane bridge for Minnesota State Highway 101 when the highway was rerouted around Elk River. The southbound bridge was built in 1993 when Highway 101 was expanded to four lanes.

The bridge is named for Betty Adkins, a Minnesota Democratic–Farmer–Labor Party state senator from St. Michael, Minnesota who served 12 years in the Minnesota Legislature. Adkins was known for her resilient character despite having been diagnosed with cancer and losing her daughter and grandson in a car accident.

== See also ==
- List of crossings of the Upper Mississippi River
