= I-35W Minnesota River bridge =

I-35W Minnesota River Bridge
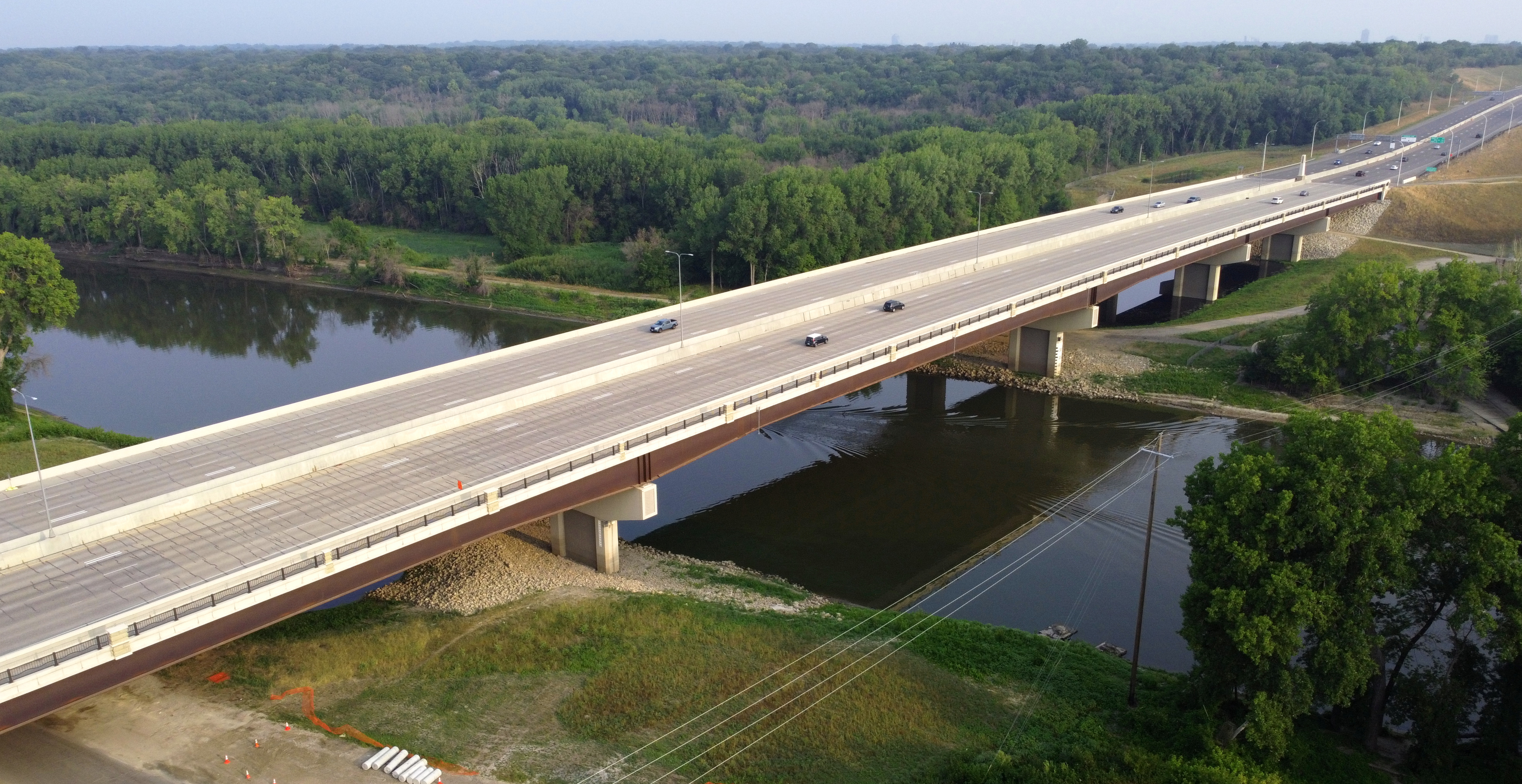
- Coordinates: 44°48′0″N 93°17′24″W
- Carries: Eight Lanes of I-35W;
- Crosses: Minnesota River
- Locale: Bloomington, Minnesota and Burnsville, Minnesota
- Maintained by: Minnesota Department of Transportation (Mn/DOT)
- ID number: NBI 27W38 (Northbound), 27W39 (Southbound)

Characteristics
- Design: Steel Continuous-Beam Span
- Total length: 1,361.5 feet (415 m)
- Width: 170.0 feet (52 m)
- Longest span: 385.0 feet (117 m)
- No. of spans: 2
- No. of lanes: 8

History
- Construction start: 2018
- Construction end: 2021
- Construction cost: $147,600,000
- Opened: 2019

Statistics
- Daily traffic: 54,500

Location
- Interactive map of I-35W Minnesota River Bridge

The I-35W Minnesota River Bridge connects the counties of Hennepin and Dakota, and the cities of Bloomington and Burnsville, over the Minnesota River. The bridge has eight lanes, four lanes in each direction. Inner lanes are MnPass HOV lanes, and a walking/bicycling path is located on the east side of the northbound span. The bridge is 1,361 feet (415 m) long, and 170 feet (52 m) wide.

1960-2018 I-35W Minnesota River bridge
- Coordinates: 44°48′01″N 93°17′24″W
- Carries: four southbound and three northbound lanes of I-35W
- Crosses: Minnesota River
- Locale: Dakota and Hennepin counties
- Maintained by: Minnesota Department of Transportation
- ID number: 5983

Characteristics
- Design: Plate girder bridge
- Total length: 1,446 feet (441 m)
- Width: 103 feet (31 m) (seven traffic lanes)
- Clearance below: 54 feet (16 m)

History
- Opened: 1960
- Closed: 2018

This bridge replaced a seven-lane steel girder bridge, constructed in 1960 by the Minnesota Highway Department. When it was built, it replaced a former bridge, located just to the east of the current bridge site, that carried US 65. Approaches to the former bridge had issues with flooding, with a 1965 flood putting the causeway just south of the bridge completely underwater. MnPass lanes were added in 2009.

== See also ==
- List of crossings of the Minnesota River
