= Traverse Township, Nicollet County, Minnesota =

Traverse Township, Minnesota
- Township
- Location within the state of Minnesota Traverse Township, Minnesota (the United States)
- Coordinates: 44°21′53″N 94°1′25″W
- Country: United States
- State: Minnesota
- County: Nicollet

Area
  - Total: 23.6 sq mi (61.2 km^{2})
  - Land: 23.0 sq mi (59.6 km^{2})
  - Water: 0.62 sq mi (1.6 km^{2})
- Elevation: 991 ft (302 m)

Population (2000)
  - Total: 264
  - Density: 11.7/sq mi (4.5/km^{2})
- Time zone: UTC-6 (Central (CST))
  - Summer (DST): UTC-5 (CDT)
- FIPS code: 27-65416
- GNIS feature ID: 0665805

Traverse Township is a township in Nicollet County, Minnesota, United States. The population was 367 at the 2000 census. Traverse Township was organized in 1858, and named after Traverse.

== Geography ==
According to the United States Census Bureau, the township has a total area of 23.6 square miles (61.2 km^{2}), of which 23.0 square miles (59.6 km^{2}) is land and 0.6 square mile (1.6 km^{2}) (2.54%) is water.

== Demographics ==
As of the census of 2023, there were 264 people, 108 households, and 102 families residing in the township. The population density was 11.7 people per square mile (4.5 person/km^{2}). There were 108 housing units at an average of 2.4 persons per household. The racial makeup of the township was 98.5% White, 1.1% Native and .4% Asian.

Out of the 108 housing units, 105 is single-unit and 3 is mobile home. One household is rented while the rest is occupied by its owner.

Approximately 68% of the town population is married, which composed of 60% of male and 78% of male population. The most common level of education is college at 40% and high school at 31%. The rest is Bachelor's at 16%, Post-grad at 11%, and no formal education at 2%. The male-to-female ratio among the population is approximately 1:1.

The average income per capita is $54,696 and median household income at $106,000. Around 3.1% of the population is considered to be in poverty.
