= Camp Release Township, Lac qui Parle County, Minnesota =

Camp Release Township, Minnesota
- Township
- Location within the state of Minnesota Camp Release Township, Minnesota (the United States)
- Coordinates: 44°55′41″N 95°48′32″W
- Country: United States
- State: Minnesota
- County: Lac qui Parle

Area
  - Total: 29.3 sq mi (75.9 km^{2})
  - Land: 29.3 sq mi (75.9 km^{2})
  - Water: 0 sq mi (0.0 km^{2})
- Elevation: 997 ft (304 m)

Population (2000)
  - Total: 293
  - Density: 10/sq mi (3.9/km^{2})
- Time zone: UTC-6 (Central (CST))
  - Summer (DST): UTC-5 (CDT)
- FIPS code: 27-09550
- GNIS feature ID: 0663737

Camp Release Township is a township in Lac qui Parle County, Minnesota, United States. The population was 293 at the 2000 census.

Camp Release Township was organized in 1871, and named in commemoration of the surrender at Camp Release.

== Geography ==
According to the United States Census Bureau, the township has a total area of 29.3 square miles (76 km^{2}), all land.

== Demographics ==
As of the census of 2000, there were 293 people, 114 households, and 84 families residing in the township. The population density was 10.0 inhabitants per square mile (3.9/km^{2}). There were 120 housing units at an average density of 4.1 per square mile (1.6/km^{2}). The racial makeup of the township was 98.29% White, 0.34% African American, 1.02% Asian, and 0.34% from two or more races.

There were 114 households, out of which 36.8% had children under the age of 18 living with them, 67.5% were married couples living together, 2.6% had a female householder with no husband present, and 26.3% were non-families. 22.8% of all households were made up of individuals, and 12.3% had someone living alone who was 65 years of age or older. The average household size was 2.57 and the average family size was 3.05.

In the township the population was spread out, with 27.6% under the age of 18, 4.4% from 18 to 24, 25.9% from 25 to 44, 27.3% from 45 to 64, and 14.7% who were 65 years of age or older. The median age was 41 years. For every 100 females, there were 95.3 males. For every 100 females age 18 and over, there were 94.5 males.

The median income for a household in the township was $34,286, and the median income for a family was $60,313. Males had a median income of $36,875 versus $23,393 for females. The per capita income for the township was $20,174. About 4.8% of families and 6.1% of the population were below the poverty line, including 4.4% of those under the age of eighteen and 5.0% of those 65 or over.
