= Yellow Bank Township, Lac qui Parle County, Minnesota =

Yellow Bank Township, Minnesota
- Township
- Location within the state of Minnesota Yellow Bank Township, Minnesota (the United States)
- Coordinates: 45°12′14″N 96°24′17″W
- Country: United States
- State: Minnesota
- County: Lac qui Parle

Area
  - Total: 35.4 sq mi (91.6 km^{2})
  - Land: 35.2 sq mi (91.2 km^{2})
  - Water: 0.12 sq mi (0.3 km^{2})
- Elevation: 1,060 ft (323 m)

Population (2000)
  - Total: 177
  - Density: 4.9/sq mi (1.9/km^{2})
- Time zone: UTC-6 (Central (CST))
  - Summer (DST): UTC-5 (CDT)
- FIPS code: 27-72058
- GNIS feature ID: 0666066
- Website: https://yellowbanktownship.com/

Yellow Bank Township is a township in Lac qui Parle County, Minnesota, United States. The population was 177 at the 2000 census.

Yellow Bank Township was organized in 1878, and named after the Yellow Bank River.

== Geography ==
According to the United States Census Bureau, the township has a total area of 35.3 square miles (91.6 km^{2}), of which 35.2 square miles (91.2 km^{2}) is land and 0.1 square mile (0.3 km^{2}) (0.37%) is water. Most of the township's northern boundary is defined by the Minnesota River; the Yellow Bank River, a tributary of the Minnesota, flows through the eastern part of the township.

== Demographics ==
As of the census of 2000, there were 177 people, 69 households, and 54 families residing in the township. The population density was 5.0 people per square mile (1.9/km^{2}). There were 82 housing units at an average density of 2.3/sq mi (0.9/km^{2}). The racial makeup of the township was 100.00% White.

There were 69 households, out of which 29.0% had children under the age of 18 living with them, 73.9% were married couples living together, 1.4% had a female householder with no husband present, and 21.7% were non-families. 20.3% of all households were made up of individuals, and 11.6% had someone living alone who was 65 years of age or older. The average household size was 2.57 and the average family size was 2.94.

In the township the population was spread out, with 24.3% under the age of 18, 6.2% from 18 to 24, 27.1% from 25 to 44, 22.6% from 45 to 64, and 19.8% who were 65 years of age or older. The median age was 39 years. For every 100 females, there were 124.1 males. For every 100 females age 18 and over, there were 109.4 males.

The median income for a household in the township was $33,036, and the median income for a family was $34,464. Males had a median income of $23,750 versus $16,500 for females. The per capita income for the township was $14,867. About 4.4% of families and 4.2% of the population were below the poverty line, including none of those under the age of eighteen or sixty five or over.
