= Prairie remnant =

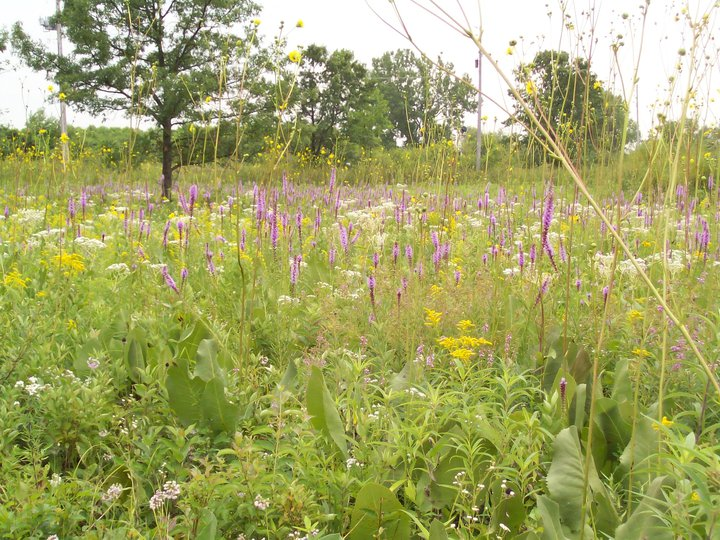
A prairie remnant near Chicago, Illinois

A prairie remnant commonly refers to grassland areas in the Western and Midwestern United States and Canada that remain to some extent undisturbed by European settlement. Prairie remnants range in levels of degradation, but nearly all contain at least some semblance of the pre-Columbian local plant assemblage of a particular region. Prairie remnants have become increasingly threatened due to the threats of agricultural, urban and suburban development, pollution, fire suppression, and the incursion of invasive species.

== Prairie remnants in restoration ecology ==
Prairie remnants offer valuable varieties of rare species, thus providing excellent opportunities for restoration ecology projects. Many restoration projects are simply recreations of prairie habitats, but restoring prairie remnants preserves more complete ecological structures that were naturally created after the end of the last ice age. Remnants can also be platforms for additional surrounding ecological restoration activities.

== Tallgrass prairies in North America ==
It has been estimated that 99% of tallgrass prairie habitats in North America have been destroyed mainly due to conversion to agriculture. Tallgrass prairies are generally composed of a mixture of native grasses, sedges, and forbs but are usually dominated by grasses.

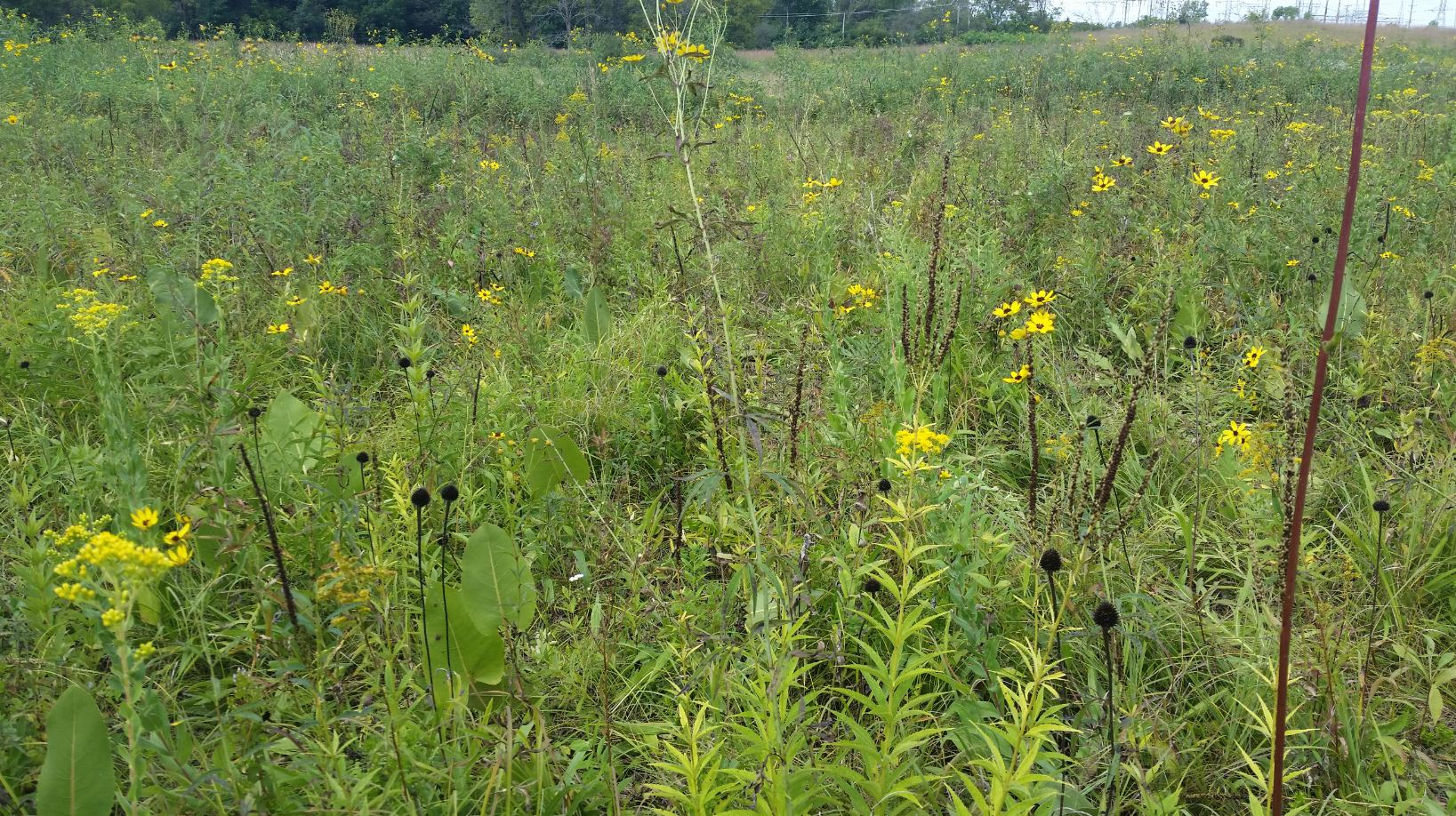
A mesic prairie remnant in Illinois

== Shortgrass prairies in North America ==
The shortgrass prairie is an ecosystem located in the Great Plains of North America. The prairie includes lands to the west as far as the eastern foothills of the Rocky Mountains and extends east as far as Nebraska and north into Saskatchewan. The prairie stretches through parts of Alberta, Wyoming, Montana, North Dakota, South Dakota, and Kansas and passes south through the high plains of Colorado, Oklahoma, Texas, and New Mexico.
