= Big Stone National Wildlife Refuge =

National wildlife refuge in Minnesota, United States

- IUCN category IV (habitat/species management area)
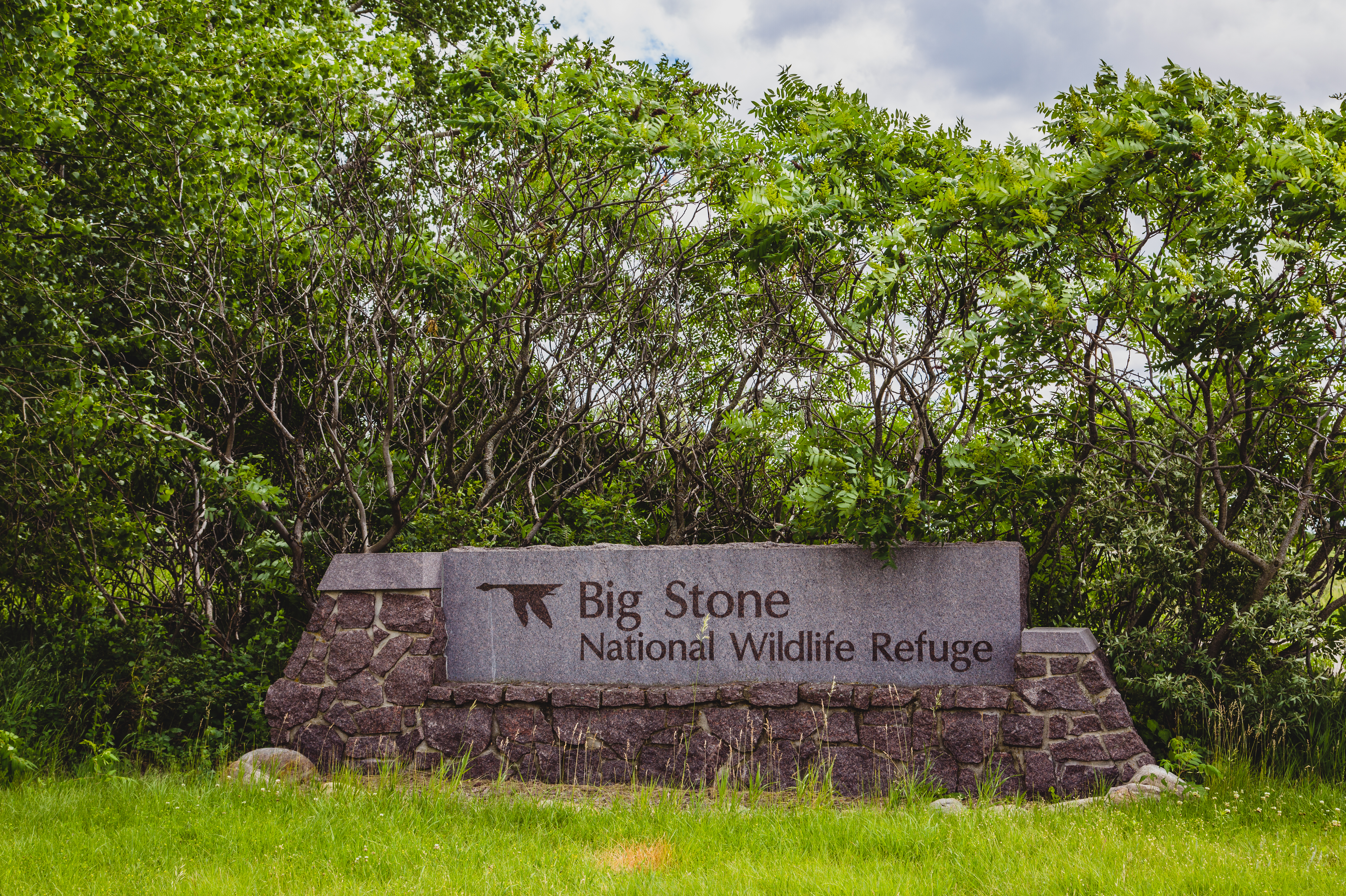
- An entrance sign marker at Big Stone National Wildlife Refuge

- Location within the United States
- Location: Big Stone County, Lac qui Parle County, Minnesota, United States
- Nearest city: Ortonville, Minnesota
- Coordinates: 45.242°N 96.347°W
- Area: 11,586 acres (46.89 km^{2})
- Established: 1975
- Governing body: U.S. Fish and Wildlife Service
- Website: Big Stone National Wildlife Refuge

Straddling the headwaters of the Minnesota River in west-central Minnesota, Big Stone National Wildlife Refuge is within the heart of the tallgrass prairie's historic range. Today, less than one-percent of tallgrass prairie remains.

Big Stone Refuge serves as the "keeper of the prairie" by working to maintain and restore native prairie habitat while providing optimum nesting cover for waterfowl and other grassland nesting birds. The refuge contains 11,521 acres (46.62 km^{2}): 1,028 acres in Big Stone County and 10,493 acres (42.46 km^{2}) in Lac qui Parle County. The refuge is located in Minnesota's 7th congressional district.

The primary refuge purposes stated in authorizing documents are flood control, recreation, and fish and wildlife conservation. The refuge's principal objective is to provide optimum nesting cover for ground-nesting waterfowl production.

== Geography and geology ==
The park is located at the headwaters of the Minnesota River, near the border of South Dakota and Minnesota. Big Stone Lake lies a mile north of the refuge.

=== Geology ===
The refuge lies at the southern extent of what was once glacial Lake Agassiz. About 9,000 years ago, glacial River Warren flowed south from Lake Agassiz, carving out today's Minnesota River Valley and dropping large boulders across the landscape. The glacial river also exposed granite bedrock (gneiss and biotite) estimated to be 2.7 billion years old, some of the oldest known rocks in the world.

Glacial retreat at the end of the Wisconsin glaciation around 10,000 years ago left numerous depressions across the landscape. These "potholes" became shallow, ephemeral wetland basins amidst a sea of grass, across an area now known as the Prairie Pothole Region.

=== Climate ===
Big Stone experiences a temperate climate, with warm-to-hot summers and cold winters. Average summer temperatures are 81.6 °F with highs above 100 °F (maximum recorded temperature of 108 °F). Average winter high temperatures are 20 °F (minimum recorded temperature of −36 °F). Average annual precipitation is 24.08 in and annual average snowfall is 40 in.

== History ==
Drought in the mid-1930s caused water levels at Big Stone Lake to drop below desired levels. To counter this, the state of Minnesota initiated the Big Stone Lake-Whetstone River project. This project established a water control structure near the outlet of the lake and was supposed to divert the Whetstone River into the lake. However, the project was not completed as planned, and locals claimed that the Whetstone River was accelerating sediment flows into the lake.

A US Army Corps of Engineers investigation confirmed that the failure of the previous project was due to the diversion of the Whetstone River as well as flooding along the Minnesota River Valley immediately below the lake. The project was then revitalized under the Flood Control Act of 1965. This second attempt at the project replaced the Big Stone Dam water control structure with a gated spillway and the Highway 75 Dam. Project lands below the dam were transferred from the US Army Corps of Engineers to the US Fish and Wildlife Service in 1975.

== Wildlife and ecology ==
=== Flora ===
Wetlands and grasslands represent the dominant cover types at the refuge.

About 4,500 acres of the refuge is covered in wetlands, with cattail as the dominant species.

Of the 5,500 acres of grassland, about 1,700 acres are considered prairie remnants. Wet meadows represent the transition from wetlands to grasslands and have largely been invaded by non-native reed canary grass within the refuge, though a few areas remain dominated by sedges and prairie cordgrass.

=== Fauna ===
Over 250 bird species have been observed in the refuge. The site represents an important migration stopover at the edge of the Mississippi and Central flyways. Audubon Minnesota includes the refuge in its Lac qui Parle-Big Stone Important Bird Area (IBA). In the spring, upwards of 75,000 ducks and 84,000 geese have been counted. Dominant species include Canada goose, mallard, blue-winged teal, gadwall, green-winged teal, lesser scaup, and ring-necked duck. Big Stone is an important breeding area for grassland bird species of concern including bobolinks and grasshopper sparrows. Black terns commonly nest in wetland areas. Eastern wild turkey were reintroduced to the refuge in 1995 and their population have since reached levels sustainable for hunting. Greater prairie-chickens were reintroduced between 1999 and 2005, but most settled off refuge. A sharp-tailed grouse lek was recorded on the refuge in 2007.

The refuge has recorded 45 mammal species. The most common species include white-tailed deer, coyote, Eastern cottontail, and several species of squirrel. North American river otter were first reintroduced to Minnesota at the refuge in 1981 and are frequently observed.

The Dakota skipper is the only federally listed species of the 46 butterfly species that have been observed on the refuge. Other species of concern include the poweshiek skipperling and regal fritillary.

Other species found on the refuge include 12 reptiles, 8 amphibian, and 35 species of fish.

== Recreation ==
Approximately 30,000 people visit the refuge annually to engage in activities including wildlife viewing, hunting, fishing, hiking, and non-motorized boating within the Minnesota River channel. Hiking trails and scenic overlooks are accessed along the 6-mile auto tour.

== See also ==
- Northern Tallgrass Prairie National Wildlife Refuge
