= Blakeley, Minnesota =

Blakeley
- Unincorporated community
- Former bank building and house on Elm Way

- Location within Minnesota Location within the United States
- Coordinates: 44°36′39″N 93°51′12″W
- Country: United States
- State: Minnesota
- County: Scott
- Township: Blakeley Township
- Elevation: 745 ft (227 m)
- Time zone: UTC-6 (Central (CST))
  - Summer (DST): UTC-5 (CDT)
- ZIP code: 56011
- Area codes: 952 and 507
- GNIS feature ID: 640253

Blakeley is an unincorporated community in Blakeley Township, Scott County, Minnesota, United States, along the Minnesota River. The community is located west-southwest of Belle Plaine near the junction of Scott County Roads 1, 6, and 60.

Historical population
Census	Pop.	Note	%±
1880	94		—
U.S. Decennial Census

== Geography ==
Nearby places include Belle Plaine, Henderson, Green Isle, and the future home of Blakeley Bluffs Regional Park Reserve. U.S. Highway 169 is also in the immediate area.

== History ==
Blakeley was laid out in 1867. It was named for Russell Blakely, a Minnesota businessperson in transportation. A post office was established in Blakeley in 1868, and remained in operation until it was discontinued in 1966.
