= Minnesota State Highway 101 =

State highway in Minnesota, United States

Trunk Highway 101

Route information
- Maintained by MnDOT
- Existed: 1934–present

Section 1
- Length: 2.4 mi (3.9 km)
- South end: MN 5 at Chanhassen
- North end: CSAH 62

Section 2
- Length: 6.9 mi (11.1 km)
- South end: I-94 at Rogers
- North end: US 10 / US 169 at Elk River

Location
- Country: United States
- State: Minnesota
- Counties: Carver, Hennepin, Wright, Sherburne

Highway system
- Minnesota Trunk Highway System; Interstate; US; State; Legislative; Scenic
← MN 100	→ MN 102

Minnesota State Highway 101 (MN 101) is a state highway in the U.S. state of Minnesota. The present day route currently has two separate segments. The roadway was a continuous route until 1988.

== Route description ==
The northern section of the roadway, between Rogers and Elk River, is 6.9 miles (11.1 km) in length. This is a busy highway, well-used on weekends by Twin Cities travelers going west on Interstate 94/US Highway 52 (I-94/US 52) through Elk River and continuing north on US 169 to Mille Lacs Lake and other lakes in Central Minnesota. This amount of use led Minnesota Department of Transportation (MnDOT) to build interchanges along the route and convert the portion of MN 101 in Wright County to a full freeway. These interchanges are at County Road 36 (CR 36), CR 37, CR 39, and CR 42. The project of converting the Wright County portion to a freeway was completed in 2008. In 2010, MnDOT built a new flyover ramp at the interchange of MN 101 and I-94/US 52. This ramp allows traffic connecting from westbound I-94 to northbound MN 101 to bypass the stoplights at the interchange and the South Diamond Lake Road intersection. In 2014, the intersection at CR 144 was converted to a diverging diamond interchange, leaving the intersection at South Diamond Lake Road as the only intersection on MN 101 between I-94/US 52 and US 10.

MN 101 originally had a longer mileage, starting in Elk River, continuing south through Rogers, Maple Grove, Plymouth, Wayzata, Minnetonka, and Chanhassen before crossing the Minnesota River and terminating in Shakopee. Beginning in 1988, the section of MN 101 between Chanhassen and Rogers has been turned back to county maintenance in several stages.

The section of MN 101 in Chanhassen is still active as a state highway. However, this part of the highway has also had some turnbacks. MN 101 used to cross the Minnesota River and enter downtown Shakopee, then turned east and proceeded just south of the Minnesota River to a junction with MN 13 in Savage. The new US 169 freeway bypass of Shakopee in 1996 meant that MN 101 was no longer necessary to maintain as a state marked route east of downtown Shakopee. The section of old MN 101 east of US 169 to MN 13 at Savage is still maintained as a state highway, but not with a signed route number. Instead, it has the unmarked route number of Trunk Highway 901B. The 2004 Control Section Guide states that this section is considered part of the US 169/CR 101/MN 13 interchange (at the Shakopee–Savage boundary line) and will not have a route or control section number.

All sections of old MN 101 that have been turned back to county maintenance since 1988 are signed as County Road 101 to maintain a unity in the eyes of the general public.

One section south of Rogers remains signed as MN 101 as of 2019: a section between Vine Hill Road in Eden Prairie and the east intersection with MN 5 in Chanhassen.

== History ==
MN 101 was defined, along with many other routes, by Chapter 440 of the 1933 Minnesota Session Laws. The Minnesota Department of Highways (now MnDOT) took over maintenance of the roadway in 1934. MN 101 began at MN 13 in Savage, at the intersection of Dakota Avenue and McColl Drive and ran west on McColl Drive and Eagle Creek Boulevard to downtown Shakopee. Old MN 101 crossed the Minnesota River with US 169, and crossed US 212 along the present day Carver County portion of MN 101. From Shakopee to near Rogers, the original routing of MN 101 matched the present day State MN 101 and County Road 101 except in downtown Chanhassen, where old MN 101 had followed Great Plains Boulevard and 78th Street (the later MN 5), in downtown Wayzata, where old MN 101 followed LaSalle Street to Central Avenue, and on the State MN 55/MN 101 concurrency at Plymouth–Medina, which was along Old Rockford Road and Hamel Road. Instead of using old MN 152 (now CR 81) into Rogers, old MN 101 continued north on Brockton Avenue (now CR 13) and crossed the Crow River at its mouth, then heading northwest and north on River Road and Parrish Avenue to the Parrish Avenue Bridge over the Mississippi River. Upon crossing the bridge, old MN 101 entered Elk River and immediately ended at US 10 and US 169 via short pieces of Main Street and Jackson Avenue.

The US 169 bypass east of downtown Elk River was built in 1961, and old MN 101 was extended north on old US 169 (Jackson Avenue) to the north end of the bypass. Later, in 1968, the bypass was extended south to old MN 152 in Rogers, and MN 101 was realigned to be concurrent with old MN 152 and use the new bypass from Rogers north to Elk River. The original alignment of MN 101 was turned over to the counties (renumbered as CR 13/Brockton Avenue in northern Hennepin County and CR 42 in Wright County), and the extension north of downtown Elk River was renumbered State Highway 201 until 1987. MN 101 was realigned to the present day CR 101 between Savage and downtown Shakopee in 1940. In 1964, the MN 5 bypass of downtown Chanhassen was built, but MN 101 remained on the old route until the 1980s, when it was moved to the bypass. The relocation of MN 55 at Plymouth–Medina, and with it the brief MN 55/MN 101 concurrency, came in 1942 west of and 1954 east of the intersection with the old alignment.

== Major intersections ==
The following list includes the major intersections of both present day MN 101 and CR 101.

County	Location	mi	km	Destinations	Notes
Scott	Savage	0.000	0.000	MN 13	South end of unmarked route 901B
Scott	Shakopee	1.128– 1.188	1.815– 1.912	US 169 south / CSAH 21 – Mankato	Northbound exit and southbound entrance; interchange
Scott	Shakopee	1.704	2.742	US 169 north – Bloomington	North end of unmarked route 901B; south end of CR 101; interchange
Scott	Shakopee			CSAH 69	Old US 169 southbound
Minnesota River		8.328	13.403	Shakopee Bridge	
Carver	Chanhassen	8.837– 8.902	14.222– 14.326	CR 61 east (Flying Cloud Drive)	Old US 212 eastbound
Carver	Chanhassen	9.037	14.544	CR 61 west (Flying Cloud Drive)	Old US 212 westbound
Carver	Chanhassen	11.500	18.507	US 212	New US 212 freeway
Carver	Chanhassen	12.755	20.527	MN 5 west	North end of CR 101
Carver	Chanhassen	13.391	21.551	MN 5 east	South end of MN 101
Hennepin	Eden Prairie	15.534	25.000	Vine Hill Road	North end of MN 101; south end of CR 101
Hennepin	Minnetonka			CR 62	
Hennepin	Minnetonka			MN 7	
Hennepin	Wayzata			US 12 east / CR 15	Interchange
Hennepin	Wayzata			US 12	Interchange
Hennepin	Plymouth			MN 55 east	South end of MN 55 overlap
Hennepin	Medina			MN 55 west	North end of MN 55 overlap
Hennepin	Maple Grove			CR 10	1/4-mile (0.40 km) overlap segment with CR 10 eliminated in 2010, now intersection
Hennepin	Dayton			CR 81 / CR 13	Northern terminus of CR 101; old MN 101 uses CR 81; CR 101 becomes CR 13
Hennepin	Rogers	39.624– 39.663	63.769– 63.831	I-94 (US 52) – Minneapolis, St. Paul, St. Cloud	North end of CR 81; south end of MN 101
Hennepin	Rogers	39.856	64.142	South Diamond Lake Road	A flyover ramp connecting WB I-94 with NB MN 101 bypasses this intersection.
Hennepin	Rogers	40.708	65.513	CR 144 (141st Avenue)	Replaced with an interchange
Wright	St. Michael	42.028	67.638	CSAH 36 (53rd Street) / I-94 Alt. west	Replaced with an interchange
Wright	St. Michael	43.635	70.224	CSAH 37 (70th Street)	Replaced with an interchange
Wright	Otsego	44.448	71.532	CSAH 42 (River Road)	Replaced with an interchange
Wright	Otsego	45.688	73.528	CSAH 39 (90th Street)	Replaced with an interchange
Mississippi River		46.200– 46.334	74.352– 74.567	Betty Adkins Bridge	
Sherburne	Elk River	46.466– 46.479	74.780– 74.801	US 10 / US 169 – Anoka, Elk River, Princeton	Northern terminus of MN 101
1.000 mi = 1.609 km; 1.000 km = 0.621 mi: Concurrency terminus; Incomplete access
