= Agassiz Township, Lac qui Parle County, Minnesota =

Agassiz Township, Minnesota
- Township
- Location within the state of Minnesota Agassiz Township, Minnesota (the United States)
- Coordinates: 45°11′22″N 96°17′55″W
- Country: United States
- State: Minnesota
- County: Lac qui Parle

Area
  - Total: 37.3 sq mi (96.7 km^{2})
  - Land: 34.9 sq mi (90.4 km^{2})
  - Water: 2.4 sq mi (6.2 km^{2})
- Elevation: 1,037 ft (316 m)

Population (2000)
  - Total: 104
  - Density: 2.8/sq mi (1.1/km^{2})
- Time zone: UTC-6 (Central (CST))
  - Summer (DST): UTC-5 (CDT)
- FIPS code: 27-00352
- GNIS feature ID: 0663385

Agassiz Township (/ˈæɡəsi/ AG-ə-see) is a township in Lac qui Parle County, Minnesota, United States. The population was 104 at the 2000 census.

Agassiz Township was organized in 1887, and named after the prehistoric Lake Agassiz.

== Geography ==
According to the United States Census Bureau, the township has a total area of 37.3 square miles (97 km^{2}), of which 34.9 square miles (90 km^{2}) is land and 2.4 square miles (6.2 km^{2}) (6.46%) is water.

== Demographics ==
As of the census of 2000, there were 104 people, 39 households, and 29 families residing in the township. The population density was 3.0 people per square mile (1.1/km^{2}). There were 54 housing units at an average density of 1.5/sq mi (0.6/km^{2}). The racial makeup of the township was 100.00% White.

There were 39 households, out of which 28.2% had children under the age of 18 living with them, 74.4% were married couples living together, and 25.6% were non-families. 25.6% of all households were made up of individuals, and 12.8% had someone living alone who was 65 years of age or older. The average household size was 2.67 and the average family size was 3.24.

In the township the population was spread out, with 30.8% under the age of 18, 2.9% from 18 to 24, 23.1% from 25 to 44, 26.9% from 45 to 64, and 16.3% who were 65 years of age or older. The median age was 40 years. For every 100 females, there were 112.2 males. For every 100 females age 18 and over, there were 111.8 males.

The median income for a household in the township was $23,750, and the median income for a family was $34,375. Males had a median income of $19,375 versus $17,500 for females. The per capita income for the township was $12,582. There were 21.1% of families and 26.9% of the population living below the poverty line, including 56.5% of under eighteens and none of those over 64.
