= Heinola, Minnesota =

Heinola
- Unincorporated community
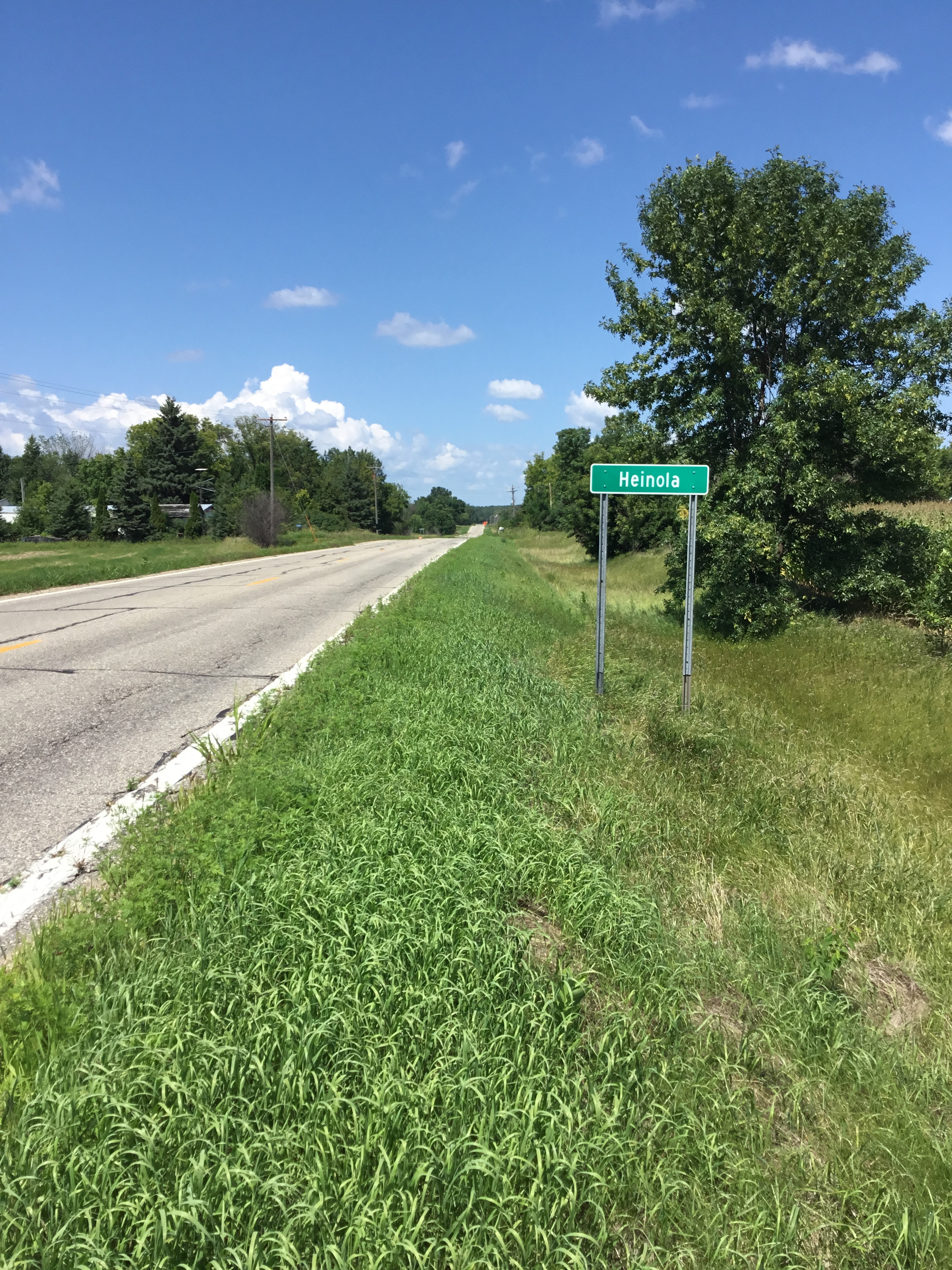
- Entering Heinola, Minnesota from the South

- Location within Minnesota Location within the United States
- Coordinates: 46°27′22″N 95°24′26″W
- Country: United States
- State: Minnesota
- County: Otter Tail
- Elevation: 1,417 ft (432 m)
- Time zone: UTC-6 (Central (CST))
  - Summer (DST): UTC-5 (CDT)
- ZIP code: 56567
- Area code: 218

Heinola is an unincorporated community in Otter Tail County, Minnesota. It is situated in the four townships of Otto, Newton, Deer Creek, and Leaf Lake.

A joint dairy, the Heinola Cooperative Creamery Association, was established in 1905 and legally organized on January 1, 1907, by local farmers.

Herman Arola and Jacob Tumberg started a general store in the home of Matti Heinonen. The area was soon called "Heinola" after the store.

Businesses in Heinola included the Heinola Cooperative Creamery Association, the Heinola Farmers Cooperative Mercantile Association, Heinola General Store, Feldt and Kauppi, the Heinola Telephone Company and the Jetenberg Cafeteria.

Current-day Heinola is a small collection of private homes. The local use of the name "Heinola" usually refers to the nearby area, often used for directions to rural farms close by.

== See also ==
- Heinola, a town in Finland
