= Dora Township =

Dora Township may refer to the following townships in the United States:

- Dora Township, Moultrie County, Illinois
- Dora Township, Otter Tail County, Minnesota
