= Richdale (disambiguation) =

Richdale is a hamlet in Alberta, Canada. Richdale may also refer to:

- Jace Richdale, an American producer and writer
- Lancelot Eric Richdale (1900–1983), a New Zealand teacher and amateur ornithologist
- Richdale Estates, Alberta, Canada, a locality
- Richdale, Minnesota, an unincorporated community in the United States
