= Parkers Prairie =

Parkers Prairie can refer to a community in the United States:

- Parkers Prairie, Minnesota
- Parkers Prairie Township, Otter Tail County, Minnesota
