= Leaf Mountain =

Leaf Mountain may refer to:

- Leaf Mountain Township, Otter Tail County, Minnesota
- Leaf Mountain Township, Burke County, North Dakota, in Burke County, North Dakota
