= Orwell Township =

Orwell Township may refer to the following townships in the United States:

- Orwell Township, Otter Tail County, Minnesota
- Orwell Township, Ashtabula County, Ohio
- Orwell Township, Pennsylvania
