= Carlisle Township =

Carlisle Township may refer to the following townships in the United States:

- Carlisle Township, Otter Tail County, Minnesota
- Carlisle Township, Lorain County, Ohio
