= Dane Lake =

Lake in the state of Minnesota, United States

- Location within Minnesota Location within the United States
- Location: Otter Tail County, Minnesota
- Coordinates: 46°15′33″N 95°52′24″W
- Type: lake
- Basin countries: United States
- Surface elevation: 1,283 ft (391 m)

Dane Lake is a lake in Otter Tail County, in the U.S. state of Minnesota.

Dane Lake was so named on account of a Danish pioneer having settled there.

== See also ==
- List of lakes in Minnesota
