= Homestead Township =

Homestead Township may refer to:

- Homestead Township, Chase County, Kansas
- Homestead Township, Michigan
- Homestead Township, Otter Tail County, Minnesota
- Homestead Township, Richland County, North Dakota, in Richland County, North Dakota
