= Edna Township =

Edna Township may refer to:

- Edna Township, Cass County, Iowa
- Edna Township, Otter Tail County, Minnesota
- Edna Township, Barnes County, North Dakota
