= Effington =

Effington can refer to:

- Effington Township, Minnesota
- New Effington, South Dakota
- "Effington", a song by Ben Folds from his album Way to Normal
