= Aurdal (disambiguation) =

Aurdal may refer to:

== Places ==
- Nord-Aurdal Municipality, a municipality in Innlandet county, Norway
  - Aurdal, a village within Nord-Aurdal Municipality in Innlandet county, Norway
- Sør-Aurdal Municipality, a municipality in Innlandet county, Norway
- Aurdal Township, Minnesota, a township in Otter Tail county, Minnesota, United States

== People ==
- Olaf Aurdal (born 1939), Norwegian politician
- Synnøve Anker Aurdal (1908–2000), Norwegian textile artist
