= Girard Township =

Girard Township may refer to the following places in the United States:

- Girard Township, Macoupin County, Illinois
- Girard Township, Michigan
- Girard Township, Erie County, Pennsylvania
- Girard Township, Clearfield County, Pennsylvania
- Girard Township, Otter Tail County, Minnesota
