= Trondhjem Township, Otter Tail County, Minnesota =

Trondhjem Township, Minnesota
- Township
- Location of Trondhjem Township, within Otter Tail County, Minnesota

- Location within the state of Minnesota Trondhjem Township, Minnesota (the United States)
- Coordinates: 46°29′44″N 96°12′29″W
- Country: United States
- State: Minnesota
- County: Otter Tail

Area
  - Total: 33.9 sq mi (87.8 km^{2})
  - Land: 33.1 sq mi (85.6 km^{2})
  - Water: 0.85 sq mi (2.2 km^{2})
- Elevation: 1,362 ft (415 m)

Population (2020)
  - Total: 177
  - Density: 5.36/sq mi (2.07/km^{2})
- Time zone: UTC-6 (Central (CST))
  - Summer (DST): UTC-5 (CDT)
- FIPS code: 27-65524
- GNIS feature ID: 0665809

Trondhjem Township is a township in Otter Tail County, Minnesota, United States. The population was 177 at the 2020 census.

Trondhjem Township was organized in 1873, and named after Trondhjem, in Norway.

== Geography ==
According to the United States Census Bureau, the township has a total area of 33.9 square miles (87.8 km^{2}), of which 33.1 square miles (85.7 km^{2}) is land and 0.8 square miles (2.2 km^{2}) (2.48%) is water.

== Demographics ==
As of the census of 2000, there were 171 people, 62 households, and 51 families living in the township. The population density was 5.2 people per square mile (2.0/km^{2}). There were 68 housing units at an average density of 2.1/sq mi (0.8/km^{2}). The racial makeup of the township was 98.83% White, 0.58% Asian, and 0.58% from two or more races. Hispanic or Latino of any race were 0.58% of the population.

There were 62 households, out of which 33.9% had children under the age of 18 living with them, 74.2% were married couples living together, 4.8% had a female householder with no husband present, and 17.7% were non-families. 14.5% of all households were made up of individuals, and 6.5% had someone living alone who was 65 years of age or older. The average household size was 2.76 and the average family size was 3.04.

In the township the population was spread out, with 28.1% under the age of 18, 7.0% from 18 to 24, 25.1% from 25 to 44, 25.1% from 45 to 64, and 14.6% who were 65 years of age or older. The median age was 38 years. For every 100 females, there were 119.2 males. For every 100 females age 18 and over, there were 105.0 males.

The median income for a household in the township was $26,750, and the median income for a family was $28,750. Males had a median income of $22,500 versus $12,083 for females. The per capita income for the township was $18,710. None of the families and 1.9% of the population were living below the poverty line.
