= Maplewood Township, Otter Tail County, Minnesota =

Maplewood Township, Minnesota
- Township
- Location of Maplewood Township, within Otter Tail County, Minnesota

- Location within the state of Minnesota Maplewood Township, Minnesota (the United States)
- Coordinates: 46°29′43″N 95°58′45″W
- Country: United States
- State: Minnesota
- County: Otter Tail

Area
  - Total: 35.6 sq mi (92.2 km^{2})
  - Land: 32.0 sq mi (82.8 km^{2})
  - Water: 3.6 sq mi (9.4 km^{2})
- Elevation: 1,381 ft (421 m)

Population (2020)
  - Total: 294
  - Density: 9.20/sq mi (3.55/km^{2})
- Time zone: UTC-6 (Central (CST))
  - Summer (DST): UTC-5 (CDT)
- FIPS code: 27-40364
- GNIS feature ID: 0664910

Maplewood Township is a township in Otter Tail County, Minnesota, United States. The population was 294 at the 2020 census.

Maplewood Township was originally called St. Agnes Township, and under the latter name was organized in 1880. The township was renamed in 1882 for the sugar maple trees within its borders.

== Geography ==
According to the United States Census Bureau, the township has a total area of 35.6 square miles (92.2 km^{2}), of which 32.0 square miles (82.8 km^{2}) is land and 3.6 square miles (9.4 km^{2}) (10.17%) is water.

== Demographics ==
As of the census of 2000, there were 333 people, 131 households, and 97 families residing in the township. The population density was 10.4 inhabitants per square mile (4.0/km^{2}). There were 173 housing units at an average density of 5.4 per square mile (2.1/km^{2}). The racial makeup of the township was 93.99% White, 0.30% African American, 2.10% Native American, 0.90% Asian, 0.30% from other races, and 2.40% from two or more races. Hispanic or Latino of any race were 1.50% of the population.

There were 131 households, out of which 28.2% had children under the age of 18 living with them, 71.0% were married couples living together, 3.1% had a female householder with no husband present, and 25.2% were non-families. 21.4% of all households were made up of individuals, and 6.1% had someone living alone who was 65 years of age or older. The average household size was 2.54 and the average family size was 2.96.

In the township the population was spread out, with 24.3% under the age of 18, 4.5% from 18 to 24, 30.0% from 25 to 44, 24.9% from 45 to 64, and 16.2% who were 65 years of age or older. The median age was 40 years. For every 100 females, there were 123.5 males. For every 100 females age 18 and over, there were 117.2 males.

The median income for a household in the township was $45,250, and the median income for a family was $48,333. Males had a median income of $36,250 versus $22,750 for females. The per capita income for the township was $23,181. About 4.0% of families and 3.3% of the population were below the poverty line, including none of those under age 18 and 6.3% of those age 65 or over.
