= Blowers Township, Otter Tail County, Minnesota =

Blowers Township, Minnesota
- Township
- Location of Blowers Township, within Otter Tail County, Minnesota

- Location within the state of Minnesota Blowers Township, Minnesota (the United States)
- Coordinates: 46°35′25″N 95°12′29″W
- Country: United States
- State: Minnesota
- County: Otter Tail

Area
  - Total: 35.6 sq mi (92.3 km^{2})
  - Land: 35.6 sq mi (92.3 km^{2})
  - Water: 0 sq mi (0.0 km^{2})
- Elevation: 1,424 ft (434 m)

Population (2020)
  - Total: 360
  - Density: 10/sq mi (3.9/km^{2})
- Time zone: UTC-6 (Central (CST))
  - Summer (DST): UTC-5 (CDT)
- FIPS code: 27-06652
- GNIS feature ID: 0663622

Blowers Township is a township in Otter Tail County, Minnesota, United States. The population was 360 at the 2020 census.

Blowers Township was organized in 1884, and named for A. S. Blowers, a county official.

== Geography ==
According to the United States Census Bureau, the township has a total area of 35.7 square miles (92 km^{2}), all land.

== Demographics ==
As of the census of 2000, there were 319 people, 109 households, and 87 families living in the township. The population density was 8.9 inhabitants per square mile (3.4/km^{2}). There were 129 housing units at an average density of 3.6 per square mile (1.4/km^{2}). The racial makeup of the township was 97.18% White, 0.31% Asian, and 2.51% from two or more races.

There were 109 households, out of which 35.8% had children under the age of 18 living with them, 68.8% were married couples living together, 7.3% had a female householder with no husband present, and 19.3% were non-families. 15.6% of all households were made up of individuals, and 6.4% had someone living alone who was 65 years of age or older. The average household size was 2.93 and the average family size was 3.26.

In the township the population was spread out, with 29.8% under the age of 18, 8.2% from 18 to 24, 27.3% from 25 to 44, 24.8% from 45 to 64, and 10.0% who were 65 years of age or older. The median age was 36 years. For every 100 females, there were 114.1 males. For every 100 females age 18 and over, there were 119.6 males.

The median income for a household in the township was $30,000, and the median income for a family was $31,042. Males had a median income of $22,083 versus $16,154 for females. The per capita income for the township was $13,819. About 8.6% of families and 12.5% of the population were below the poverty line, including 12.7% of those under the age of 18 and 2.6% of those 65 and older.
