= Fergus Falls Township, Otter Tail County, Minnesota =

Fergus Falls Township, Minnesota
- Township
- Location of Fergus Falls Township, within Otter Tail County, Minnesota

- Location within the state of Minnesota Fergus Falls Township, Minnesota (the United States)
- Coordinates: 46°19′24″N 96°6′5″W
- Country: United States
- State: Minnesota
- County: Otter Tail

Area
  - Total: 28.6 sq mi (74.0 km^{2})
  - Land: 28.0 sq mi (72.4 km^{2})
  - Water: 0.62 sq mi (1.6 km^{2})
- Elevation: 1,266 ft (386 m)

Population (2020)
  - Total: 747
  - Density: 38/sq mi (14.5/km^{2})
- Time zone: UTC-6 (Central (CST))
  - Summer (DST): UTC-5 (CDT)
- ZIP codes: 56537-56538
- Area code: 218
- FIPS code: 27-20924
- GNIS feature ID: 0664160
- Website: https://www.fergusfallstwp.gov/

Fergus Falls Township is a township in Otter Tail County, Minnesota, United States. The population was 747 at the 2020 census.

Fergus Falls Township was organized in 1870, and named for James Fergus, an early settler, and a series of rapids on the river.

== Geography ==
According to the United States Census Bureau, the township has a total area of 28.6 square miles (74 km^{2}), of which 27.9 square miles (72 km^{2}) is land and 0.6 square miles (1.6 km^{2}) (2.17%) is water.

== Demographics ==
Historical population
Census	Pop.	Note	%±
1880	1,914		—
1890	479		−75.0%
1900	635		32.6%
1910	568		−10.6%
1920	522		−8.1%
1930	550		5.4%
1940	470		−14.5%
1950	451		−4.0%
1960	538		19.3%
1970	877		63.0%
1980	1,161		32.4%
1990	1,205		3.8%
2000	1,051		−12.8%
2010	1,006		−4.3%
2020	747		−25.7%
U.S. Decennial Census; 2020 Census

As of the census of 2000, there were 1,051 people, 358 households, and 308 families residing in the township. The population density was 37.6 inhabitants per square mile (14.5/km^{2}). There were 370 housing units at an average density of 13.2/sq mi (5.1/km^{2}). The racial makeup of the township was 99.14% White, 0.29% African American, 0.19% Native American, and 0.38% from two or more races. Hispanic or Latino of any race were 0.29% of the population.

There were 358 households, out of which 41.6% had children under the age of 18 living with them, 78.5% were married couples living together, 4.2% had a female householder with no husband present, and 13.7% were non-families. 9.8% of all households were made up of individuals, and 3.9% had someone living alone who was 65 years of age or older. The average household size was 2.92 and the average family size was 3.13.

In the township the population was spread out, with 30.7% under the age of 18, 5.6% from 18 to 24, 25.5% from 25 to 44, 26.3% from 45 to 64, and 11.9% who were 65 years of age or older. The median age was 39 years. For every 100 females, there were 108.9 males. For every 100 females age 18 and over, there were 109.8 males.

The median income for a household in the township was $54,345, and the median income for a family was $55,179. Males had a median income of $34,167 versus $21,923 for females. The per capita income for the township was $20,003. About 2.6% of families and 2.3% of the population were below the poverty line, including 0.7% of those under age 18 and none of those age 65 or over.
