= Amor Township, Otter Tail County, Minnesota =

Amor Township, Minnesota
- Township
- Location of Amor Township, within Otter Tail County, Minnesota

- Location within the state of Minnesota Amor Township, Minnesota (the United States)
- Coordinates: 46°24′58″N 95°42′32″W
- Country: United States
- State: Minnesota
- County: Otter Tail

Area
  - Total: 35.2 sq mi (91.1 km^{2})
  - Land: 23.2 sq mi (60.1 km^{2})
  - Water: 12.0 sq mi (31.0 km^{2})
- Elevation: 1,355 ft (413 m)

Population (2020)
  - Total: 481
  - Density: 24/sq mi (9.3/km^{2})
- Time zone: UTC-6 (Central (CST))
  - Summer (DST): UTC-5 (CDT)
- ZIP code: 56515
- Area code: 218
- FIPS code: 27-01468
- GNIS feature ID: 0663431
- Website: https://www.amortownshipmn.gov/

Amor Township is a township in Otter Tail County, Minnesota, United States. The population was 481 at the 2020 census.

Amor Township was organized in 1879, and named for the Latin word meaning "love".

== Geography ==
According to the United States Census Bureau, the township has a total area of 35.2 square miles (91 km^{2}), of which 23.2 square miles (60 km^{2}) is land and 12.0 square miles (31 km^{2}) (34.05%) is water.

== Demographics ==
Historical population
Census	Pop.	Note	%±
1880	208		—
1890	361		73.6%
1900	427		18.3%
1910	350		−18.0%
1920	400		14.3%
1930	405		1.3%
1940	357		−11.9%
1950	413		15.7%
1960	366		−11.4%
1970	408		11.5%
1980	510		25.0%
1990	422		−17.3%
2000	558		32.2%
2010	495		−11.3%
2020	481		−2.8%
U.S. Decennial Census; 2020 Census

As of the census of 2000, there were 558 people, 210 households, and 158 families residing in the township. The population density was 24.1 inhabitants per square mile (9.3/km^{2}). There were 640 housing units at an average density of 27.6/sq mi (10.7/km^{2}). The racial makeup of the township was 98.57% White, 0.36% Native American, 0.36% Asian, 0.18% from other races, and 0.54% from two or more races. Hispanic or Latino of any race were 0.36% of the population.

There were 210 households, out of which 25.2% had children under the age of 18 living with them, 71.0% were married couples living together, 2.4% had a female householder with no husband present, and 24.3% were non-families. 22.9% of all households were made up of individuals, and 11.9% had someone living alone who was 65 years of age or older. The average household size was 2.35 and the average family size was 2.75.

In the township the population was spread out, with 18.8% under the age of 18, 4.8% from 18 to 24, 20.4% from 25 to 44, 30.8% from 45 to 64, and 25.1% who were 65 years of age or older. The median age was 50 years. For every 100 females, there were 97.2 males. For every 100 females age 18 and over, there were 100.4 males.

The median income for a household in the township was $38,833, and the median income for a family was $43,472. Males had a median income of $27,159 versus $29,375 for females. The per capita income for the township was $20,480. About 1.9% of families and 1.7% of the population were below the poverty line, including none of those under age 18 and 5.3% of those age 65 or over.
