= Dead Lake Township, Otter Tail County, Minnesota =

Dead Lake Township, Minnesota
- Township
- Location of Dead Lake Township, within Otter Tail County, Minnesota

- Location within the state of Minnesota Dead Lake Township, Minnesota (the United States)
- Coordinates: 46°29′58″N 95°43′3″W
- Country: United States
- State: Minnesota
- County: Otter Tail

Area
  - Total: 35.1 sq mi (90.9 km^{2})
  - Land: 24.7 sq mi (63.9 km^{2})
  - Water: 10.4 sq mi (27.0 km^{2})
- Elevation: 1,362 ft (415 m)

Population (2020)
  - Total: 535
  - Density: 21.7/sq mi (8.37/km^{2})
- Time zone: UTC-6 (Central (CST))
  - Summer (DST): UTC-5 (CDT)
- FIPS code: 27-15076
- GNIS feature ID: 0663936
- Website: https://www.deadlaketownship.org/

Dead Lake Township is a township in Otter Tail County, Minnesota, United States. The population was 535 at the 2020 census.

Dead Lake Township was organized in 1897, and named for a local lake commemorating a massacre of the Ojibwe Indians.

== Geography ==
According to the United States Census Bureau, the township has a total area of 35.1 square miles (91 km^{2}), of which 24.7 square miles (64 km^{2}) is land and 10.4 square miles (27 km^{2}) (29.71%) is water.

== Demographics ==
2010 census is 494 population. As of the census of 2000, there were 452 people, 205 households, and 145 families residing in the township. The population density was 18.3 inhabitants per square mile (7.1/km^{2}). There were 524 housing units at an average density of 21.2 per square mile (8.2/km^{2}). The racial makeup of the township was 98.89% White, 0.88% Native American, 0.22% from other races. Hispanic or Latino of any race were 0.44% of the population.

There were 205 households, out of which 21.0% had children under the age of 18 living with them, 63.4% were married couples living together, 3.4% had a female householder with no husband present, and 28.8% were non-families. 25.9% of all households were made up of individuals, and 12.2% had someone living alone who was 65 years of age or older. The average household size was 2.20 and the average family size was 2.59.

In the township the population was spread out, with 16.4% under the age of 18, 5.1% from 18 to 24, 23.5% from 25 to 44, 32.3% from 45 to 64, and 22.8% who were 65 years of age or older. The median age was 49 years. For every 100 females, there were 107.3 males. For every 100 females age 18 and over, there were 110.0 males.

The median income for a household in the township was $31,786, and the median income for a family was $36,458. Males had a median income of $26,250 versus $21,875 for females. The per capita income for the township was $15,840. About 7.1% of families and 11.2% of the population were below the poverty line, including 8.4% of those under age 18 and 6.5% of those aged 65 or over.
