= Wall Lake, Minnesota =

Wall Lake
- Unincorporated community
- Location within Minnesota Location within the United States
- Coordinates: 46°17′27″N 95°57′53″W
- Country: United States
- State: Minnesota
- County: Otter Tail
- Elevation: 1,283 ft (391 m)
- Time zone: UTC-6 (Central (CST))
  - Summer (DST): UTC-5 (CDT)
- Area code: 218
- GNIS feature ID: 654993

Wall Lake is an unincorporated community in Otter Tail County, in the U.S. state of Minnesota.

== History ==
A post office was established at Wall Lake in 1870 and was discontinued in 1906. The community took its name from nearby Wall Lake.
