= Bluffton Township, Otter Tail County, Minnesota =

Bluffton Township, Minnesota
- Township
- Location of Bluffton Township, within Otter Tail County, Minnesota

- Location within the state of Minnesota Bluffton Township, Minnesota (the United States)
- Coordinates: 46°29′23″N 95°13′35″W
- Country: United States
- State: Minnesota
- County: Otter Tail

Area
  - Total: 33.0 sq mi (85.4 km^{2})
  - Land: 33.0 sq mi (85.4 km^{2})
  - Water: 0.039 sq mi (0.1 km^{2})
- Elevation: 1,398 ft (426 m)

Population (2020)
  - Total: 460
  - Density: 14/sq mi (5.4/km^{2})
- Time zone: UTC-6 (Central (CST))
  - Summer (DST): UTC-5 (CDT)
- ZIP code: 56518
- Area code: 218
- FIPS code: 27-06796
- GNIS feature ID: 0663629

Bluffton Township is a township in Otter Tail County, Minnesota, United States. The population was 460 at the 2020 census.

Bluffton Township was organized in 1878 and named for the bluffs on the Leaf River.

== Geography ==
According to the United States Census Bureau, the township has a total area of 33.0 square miles (85 km^{2}), of which 33.0 square miles (85 km^{2}) is land and 0.04 square miles (0.10 km^{2}) (0.09%) is water.

== Demographics ==
As of the census of 2000, there were 474 people, 168 households, and 131 families residing in the township. The population density was 14.4 inhabitants per square mile (5.6/km^{2}). There were 180 housing units at an average density of 5.5 per square mile (2.1/km^{2}). The racial makeup of the township was 99.16% White, 0.21% Asian, 0.21% from other races, and 0.42% from two or more races. Hispanic or Latino of any race were 0.42% of the population.

There were 168 households, out of which 39.3% had children under the age of 18 living with them, 67.3% were married couples living together, 5.4% had a female householder with no husband present, and 22.0% were non-families. 16.1% of all households were made up of individuals, and 7.7% had someone living alone who was 65 years of age or older. The average household size was 2.82 and the average family size was 3.19.

In the township, the population was spread out, with 28.9% under the age of 18, 9.5% from 18 to 24, 24.7% from 25 to 44, 26.2% from 45 to 64, and 10.8% who were 65 years of age or older. The median age was 38 years. For every 100 females, there were 111.6 males. For every 100 females age 18 and over, there were 114.6 males.

The median income for a household in the township was $45,179, and the median income for a family was $48,611. Males had a median income of $28,897 versus $17,143 for females. The per capita income for the township was $18,379. About 5.8% of families and 8.3% of the population were below the poverty line, including 13.3% of those under age 18 and 12.2% of those age 65 or over.
