= Elmo Township, Otter Tail County, Minnesota =

Elmo Township, Minnesota
- Township
- Location of Elmo Township, within Otter Tail County, Minnesota

- Location within the state of Minnesota Elmo Township, Minnesota (the United States)
- Coordinates: 46°14′19″N 95°20′35″W
- Country: United States
- State: Minnesota
- County: Otter Tail

Area
  - Total: 36.8 sq mi (95.3 km^{2})
  - Land: 36.3 sq mi (94.1 km^{2})
  - Water: 0.46 sq mi (1.2 km^{2})
- Elevation: 1,453 ft (443 m)

Population (2020)
  - Total: 323
  - Density: 8.89/sq mi (3.43/km^{2})
- Time zone: UTC-6 (Central (CST))
  - Summer (DST): UTC-5 (CDT)
- FIPS code: 27-18980
- GNIS feature ID: 0664085

Elmo Township is a township in Otter Tail County, Minnesota, United States. The population was 323 at the 2020 census.

Elmo Township was organized in 1880.

== Geography ==
According to the United States Census Bureau, the township has a total area of 36.8 square miles (95 km^{2}), of which 36.3 square miles (94 km^{2}) is land and 0.5 square miles (1.3 km^{2}) (1.28%) is water.

== Demographics ==
At the 2000 census there were 344 people, 132 households, and 100 families living in the township. The population density was 9.5 people per square mile (3.7/km^{2}). There were 161 housing units at an average density of 4.4/sq mi (1.7/km^{2}). The racial makeup of the township was 98.84% White, 0.29% Asian, 0.29% from other races, and 0.58% from two or more races. Hispanic or Latino of any race were 0.29%.

Of the 132 households 28.8% had children under the age of 18 living with them, 62.9% were married couples living together, 6.1% had a female householder with no husband present, and 23.5% were non-families. 21.2% of households were one person and 12.1% were one person aged 65 or older. The average household size was 2.61 and the average family size was 2.98.

The age distribution was 23.3% under the age of 18, 9.3% from 18 to 24, 23.8% from 25 to 44, 27.6% from 45 to 64, and 16.0% 65 or older. The median age was 41 years. For every 100 females, there were 119.1 males. For every 100 females age 18 and over, there were 107.9 males.

The median household income was $28,125 and the median family income was $35,313. Males had a median income of $23,125 versus $25,250 for females. The per capita income for the township was $12,554. About 10.5% of families and 14.2% of the population were below the poverty line, including 14.1% of those under age 18 and 21.4% of those age 65 or over.
