= Compton Township, Otter Tail County, Minnesota =

Compton Township, Minnesota
- Township
- Location of Compton Township, within Otter Tail County, Minnesota

- Location within the state of Minnesota Compton Township, Minnesota (the United States)
- Coordinates: 46°24′35″N 95°12′54″W
- Country: United States
- State: Minnesota
- County: Otter Tail

Area
  - Total: 35.7 sq mi (92.5 km^{2})
  - Land: 35.7 sq mi (92.5 km^{2})
  - Water: 0 sq mi (0.0 km^{2})
- Elevation: 1,380 ft (420 m)

Population (2020)
  - Total: 798
  - Density: 22.3/sq mi (8.63/km^{2})
- Time zone: UTC-6 (Central (CST))
  - Summer (DST): UTC-5 (CDT)
- FIPS code: 27-12844
- GNIS feature ID: 0663858

Compton Township is a township in Otter Tail County, Minnesota, United States. The population was 798 at the 2020 census.

Compton Township was organized in 1875, and named for James Compton, an early settler.

== Geography ==
According to the United States Census Bureau, the township has a total area of 35.7 square miles (92 km^{2}), all land.

== Demographics ==
As of the census of 2000, there were 799 people, 250 households, and 197 families living in the township. The population density was 22.4 inhabitants per square mile (8.6/km^{2}). There were 267 housing units at an average density of 7.5 per square mile (2.9/km^{2}). The racial makeup of the township was 98.50% White, 0.25% African American, 0.13% from other races, and 1.13% from two or more races. Hispanic or Latino of any race were 0.63% of the population.

There were 250 households, out of which 40.4% had children under the age of 18 living with them, 70.0% were married couples living together, 4.4% had a female householder with no husband present, and 21.2% were non-families. 15.6% of all households were made up of individuals, and 7.6% had someone living alone who was 65 years of age or older. The average household size was 3.20 and the average family size was 3.62.

In the township the population was spread out, with 35.3% under the age of 18, 8.0% from 18 to 24, 22.0% from 25 to 44, 24.7% from 45 to 64, and 10.0% who were 65 years of age or older. The median age was 32 years. For every 100 females, there were 117.1 males. For every 100 females age 18 and over, there were 117.2 males.

The median income for a household in the township was $32,656, and the median income for a family was $37,566. Males had a median income of $27,125 versus $20,500 for females. The per capita income for the township was $13,342. About 17.2% of families and 26.5% of the population were below the poverty line, including 38.9% of those under age 18 and 6.5% of those age 65 or over.
