= Carlisle, Minnesota =

Carlisle
- Unincorporated community
- Location within Minnesota Location within the United States
- Coordinates: 46°22′06″N 96°11′23″W
- Country: United States
- State: Minnesota
- County: Otter Tail
- Elevation: 1,247 ft (380 m)
- Time zone: UTC-6 (Central (CST))
  - Summer (DST): UTC-5 (CDT)
- Area code: 218
- GNIS feature ID: 640898

Carlisle is an unincorporated community in Otter Tail County, in the U.S. state of Minnesota.

== History ==
Carlisle was platted in 1879. A post office was established at Carlisle in 1880, and was discontinued in 1960.
