= Erhards Grove Township, Otter Tail County, Minnesota =

Erhards Grove Township, Minnesota
- Township
- Location of Erhards Grove Township, within Otter Tail County, Minnesota

- Location within the state of Minnesota Erhards Grove Township, Minnesota (the United States)
- Coordinates: 46°29′53″N 96°5′30″W
- Country: United States
- State: Minnesota
- County: Otter Tail

Area
  - Total: 35.0 sq mi (90.6 km^{2})
  - Land: 33.3 sq mi (86.2 km^{2})
  - Water: 1.7 sq mi (4.3 km^{2})
- Elevation: 1,280 ft (390 m)

Population (2020)
  - Total: 411
  - Density: 12.3/sq mi (4.77/km^{2})
- Time zone: UTC-6 (Central (CST))
  - Summer (DST): UTC-5 (CDT)
- FIPS code: 27-19574
- GNIS feature ID: 0664105

Erhards Grove Township is a township in Otter Tail County, Minnesota, United States. The population was 411 at the 2020 census.

Erhards Grove Township was organized in 1870 by Alexander E. Erhard and others.

== Geography ==
According to the United States Census Bureau, the township has a total area of 35.0 square miles (91 km^{2}), of which 33.3 square miles (86 km^{2}) is land and 1.7 square miles (4.4 km^{2}) (4.80%) is water.

== Demographics ==
As of the census of 2000, there were 467 people, 167 households, and 135 families residing in the township. The population density was 14.0 inhabitants per square mile (5.4/km^{2}). There were 182 housing units at an average density of 5.5 per square mile (2.1/km^{2}). The racial makeup of the township was 96.79% White, 0.43% African American, 0.64% Native American, 0.64% Asian, 1.07% Pacific Islander, and 0.43% from two or more races. Hispanic or Latino of any race were 0.64% of the population.

There were 167 households, out of which 41.3% had children under the age of 18 living with them, 76.0% were married couples living together, 3.6% had a female householder with no husband present, and 18.6% were non-families. 16.2% of all households were made up of individuals, and 6.6% had someone living alone who was 65 years of age or older. The average household size was 2.80 and the average family size was 3.11.

In the township the population was spread out, with 28.3% under the age of 18, 6.0% from 18 to 24, 31.3% from 25 to 44, 22.3% from 45 to 64, and 12.2% who were 65 years of age or older. The median age was 37 years. For every 100 females, there were 110.4 males. For every 100 females age 18 and over, there were 109.4 males.

The median income for a household in the township was $39,375, and the median income for a family was $45,000. Males had a median income of $30,481 versus $18,250 for females. The per capita income for the township was $18,409. About 12.0% of families and 11.9% of the population were below the poverty line, including 16.7% of those under age 18 and 10.6% of those age 65 or over.
