= Luce, Minnesota =

Luce
- Unincorporated community
- Location within Minnesota Location within the United States
- Coordinates: 46°39′28″N 95°39′10″W
- Country: United States
- State: Minnesota
- County: Otter Tail
- Elevation: 1,368 ft (417 m)
- Time zone: UTC-6 (Central (CST))
  - Summer (DST): UTC-5 (CDT)
- Area code: 218
- GNIS feature ID: 654806

Luce is an unincorporated community in Otter Tail County, in the U.S. state of Minnesota.

== History ==
Luce was platted in 1884 on the Northern Pacific Railroad. A post office was established at Luce in 1883, and remained in operation until it was discontinued in 1948.

Historical population
Census	Pop.	Note	%±
1910	139		—
1920	135		−2.9%
U.S. Decennial Census
