= Richville, Minnesota =

City in Minnesota, United States

Richville
- City
- Location of Richville, Minnesota
- Coordinates: 46°30′24″N 95°37′13″W
- Country: United States
- State: Minnesota
- County: Otter Tail
- Founded: 1903
- Incorporated: 1904

Area
  - Total: 1.00 sq mi (2.58 km^{2})
  - Land: 0.98 sq mi (2.55 km^{2})
  - Water: 0.012 sq mi (0.03 km^{2})
- Elevation: 1,358 ft (414 m)

Population (2020)
  - Total: 77
  - Estimate (2021): 76
  - Density: 78.1/sq mi (30.14/km^{2})
- Time zone: UTC-6 (CST)
  - Summer (DST): UTC-5 (CDT)
- ZIP code: 56576
- Area code: 218
- FIPS code: 27-54340
- GNIS feature ID: 2396371

Richville is a city in Otter Tail County, Minnesota, United States. The population was 77 as of the 2020 census.

== History ==
Richville was platted in 1903, and named for Watson Wellman Rich, a railroad engineer. A post office has been in operation at Richville since 1904. Richville was incorporated in 1904.

== Geography ==
According to the United States Census Bureau, the city has a total area of 1.00 square mile (2.59 km^{2}), of which 0.99 square miles (2.56 km^{2}) is land and 0.01 square miles (0.03 km^{2}) is water.

== Demographics ==
Historical population
Census	Pop.	Note	%±
1910	255		—
1920	281		10.2%
1930	179		−36.3%
1940	233		30.2%
1950	141		−39.5%
1960	91		−35.5%
1970	102		12.1%
1980	132		29.4%
1990	121		−8.3%
2000	124		2.5%
2010	96		−22.6%
2020	77		−19.8%
2021 (est.)	76		−1.3%
U.S. Decennial Census; 2020 Census

=== 2010 census ===
As of the census of 2010, there were 96 people, 43 households, and 26 families living in the city. The population density was 97.0 inhabitants per square mile (37.5/km^{2}). There were 49 housing units at an average density of 49.5 per square mile (19.1/km^{2}). The racial makeup of the city was 96.9% White, 1.0% Native American, 1.0% from other races, and 1.0% from two or more races. Hispanic or Latino of any race were 1.0% of the population.

There were 43 households, of which 23.3% had children under the age of 18 living with them, 46.5% were married couples living together, 4.7% had a female householder with no husband present, 9.3% had a male householder with no wife present, and 39.5% were non-families. 32.6% of all households were made up of individuals, and 9.4% had someone living alone who was 65 years of age or older. The average household size was 2.23 and the average family size was 2.77.

The median age in the city was 40.5 years. 18.7% of residents were under the age of 18; 11.5% were between the ages of 18 and 24; 24% were from 25 to 44; 32.4% were from 45 to 64; and 13.5% were 65 years of age or older. The gender makeup of the city was 54.2% male and 45.8% female.

=== 2000 census ===
As of the census of 2000, there were 124 people, 50 households, and 33 families living in the city. The population density was 123.7 inhabitants per square mile (47.8/km^{2}). There were 50 housing units at an average density of 49.9 per square mile (19.3/km^{2}). The racial makeup of the city was 99.19% White and 0.81% Native American. Hispanic or Latino of any race were 0.81% of the population.

There were 50 households, out of which 34.0% had children under the age of 18 living with them, 48.0% were married couples living together, 12.0% had a female householder with no husband present, and 34.0% were non-families. 30.0% of all households were made up of individuals, and 16.0% had someone living alone who was 65 years of age or older. The average household size was 2.48 and the average family size was 3.06.

In the city, the population was spread out, with 27.4% under the age of 18, 8.1% from 18 to 24, 33.1% from 25 to 44, 17.7% from 45 to 64, and 13.7% who were 65 years of age or older. The median age was 37 years. For every 100 females, there were 110.2 males. For every 100 females age 18 and over, there were 100.0 males.

The median income for a household in the city was $33,750, and the median income for a family was $42,813. Males had a median income of $30,500 versus $13,750 for females. The per capita income for the city was $16,290. There were 12.9% of families and 12.6% of the population living below the poverty line, including 12.5% of under eighteens and 11.5% of those over 64.
