= Aastad Township, Otter Tail County, Minnesota =

Aastad Township, Minnesota
- Township
- Location of Aastad Township, within Otter Tail County, Minnesota

- Location within the state of Minnesota Aastad Township, Minnesota (the United States)
- Coordinates: 46°8′41″N 96°5′29″W
- Country: United States
- State: Minnesota
- County: Otter Tail

Area
  - Total: 35.5 sq mi (91.9 km^{2})
  - Land: 34.6 sq mi (89.5 km^{2})
  - Water: 0.93 sq mi (2.4 km^{2})
- Elevation: 1,112 ft (339 m)

Population (2020)
  - Total: 191
  - Density: 5.53/sq mi (2.13/km^{2})
- Time zone: UTC-6 (Central (CST))
  - Summer (DST): UTC-5 (CDT)
- FIPS code: 27-00100
- GNIS feature ID: 0663375

Aastad Township is a township in Otter Tail County, Minnesota, United States. The population was 191 at the 2020 census.

== History ==
Aastad Township was organized in 1871, and named for Gilbert Aastad, a Norwegian settler.

== Geography ==
According to the United States Census Bureau, the township has a total area of 35.5 square miles (92 km^{2}), of which 34.5 square miles (89 km^{2}) is land and 0.9 square miles (2.3 km^{2}) (2.68%) is water.

== Demographics ==
At the 2000 census there were 187 people, 68 households, and 55 families in the township. The population density was 5.4 people per square mile (2.1/km^{2}). There were 76 housing units at an average density of 2.2/sq mi (0.8/km^{2}). The racial makeup of the township was 98.93% White and 1.07% Asian. Of the 68 households 35.3% had children under the age of 18 living with them, 75.0% were married couples living together, 2.9% had a female householder with no husband present, and 19.1% were non-families. 16.2% of households were one person and 2.9% were one person aged 65 or older. The average household size was 2.75 and the average family size was 3.13.

The age distribution was 26.7% under the age of 18, 7.0% from 18 to 24, 27.8% from 25 to 44, 27.3% from 45 to 64, and 11.2% 65 or older. The median age was 38 years. For every 100 females, there were 130.9 males. For every 100 females age 18 and over, there were 132.2 males.

The median household income was $41,563 and the median family income was $49,375. Males had a median income of $26,705 versus $17,292 for females. The per capita income for the township was $16,496. About 7.8% of families and 8.8% of the population were below the poverty line, including none of those under the age of eighteen and 33.3% of those sixty five or over.
