= Oak Valley Township, Otter Tail County, Minnesota =

Oak Valley Township, Minnesota
- Township
- Location of Oak Valley Township, within Otter Tail County, Minnesota

- Location within the state of Minnesota Oak Valley Township, Minnesota (the United States)
- Coordinates: 46°19′19″N 95°13′14″W
- Country: United States
- State: Minnesota
- County: Otter Tail

Area
  - Total: 35.7 sq mi (92.5 km^{2})
  - Land: 35.7 sq mi (92.5 km^{2})
  - Water: 0 sq mi (0.0 km^{2})
- Elevation: 1,410 ft (430 m)

Population (2020)
  - Total: 363
  - Density: 10.2/sq mi (3.92/km^{2})
- Time zone: UTC-6 (Central (CST))
  - Summer (DST): UTC-5 (CDT)
- FIPS code: 27-48004
- GNIS feature ID: 0665194

Oak Valley Township is a township in Otter Tail County, Minnesota, United States with a population of 363 according to the 2020 census.

Oak Valley Township was organized in 1877, and named for the valley of Oak Creek.

== Geography ==
According to the United States Census Bureau, the township has a total area of 35.7 square miles (92.5 km^{2}), all land.

== Demographics ==
At the 2000 census, there were 362 people, 136 households and 101 families residing in the township. The population density was 10.1 per square mile (3.9/km^{2}). There were 156 housing units at an average density of 4.4/sq mi (1.7/km^{2}). The racial makeup of the township was 98.90% White, 0.55% Native American, and 0.55% from two or more races.

There were 136 households, of which 28.7% had children under the age of 18 living with them, 63.2% were married couples living together, 8.1% had a female householder with no husband present, and 25.7% were non-families. 22.1% of all households were made up of individuals, and 8.1% had someone living alone who was 65 years of age or older. The average household size was 2.66 and the average family size was 3.09.

27.6% of the population were under the age of 18, 8.0% from 18 to 24, 25.4% from 25 to 44, 27.3% from 45 to 64, and 11.6% who were 65 years of age or older. The median age was 38 years. For every 100 females, there were 106.9 males. For every 100 females age 18 and over, there were 111.3 males.

The median household income was $23,500 and the median family income was $25,455. Males had a median income of $23,750 and females $15,750. The per capita income was $10,439. About 19.1% of families and 22.2% of the population were below the poverty line, including 27.8% of those under age 18 and 18.6% of those age 65 or over.
