= Tumuli Township, Otter Tail County, Minnesota =

Tumuli Township, Minnesota
- Township
- Location of Tumuli Township, within Otter Tail County, Minnesota

- Location within the state of Minnesota Tumuli Township, Minnesota (the United States)
- Coordinates: 46°9′25″N 95°56′34″W
- Country: United States
- State: Minnesota
- County: Otter Tail

Area
  - Total: 35.5 sq mi (92.0 km^{2})
  - Land: 28.4 sq mi (73.5 km^{2})
  - Water: 7.1 sq mi (18.4 km^{2})
- Elevation: 1,191 ft (363 m)

Population (2020)
  - Total: 407
  - Density: 14.3/sq mi (5.54/km^{2})
- Time zone: UTC-6 (Central (CST))
  - Summer (DST): UTC-5 (CDT)
- FIPS code: 27-65686
- GNIS feature ID: 0665815

Tumuli Township is a township in Otter Tail County, Minnesota, United States. The population was 407 at the 2020 census.

Tumuli Township was originally called Union Township, and under the latter name was organized in 1869. The present name, from the descriptive word tumulus, was adopted in 1870.

== Geography ==
According to the United States Census Bureau, the township has a total area of 35.5 square miles (92.0 km^{2}), of which 28.4 square miles (73.5 km^{2}) is land and 7.1 square miles (18.4 km^{2}) (20.05%) is water.

== Demographics ==
As of the census of 2000, there were 434 people, 172 households, and 136 families residing in the township. The population density was 15.3 people per square mile (5.9/km^{2}). There were 244 housing units at an average density of 8.6/sq mi (3.3/km^{2}). The racial makeup of the township was 98.85% White, 0.69% Native American and 0.46% Asian. Hispanic or Latino of any race were 0.46% of the population.

There were 172 households, out of which 27.9% had children under the age of 18 living with them, 71.5% were married couples living together, 5.2% had a female householder with no husband present, and 20.9% were non-families. 18.6% of all households were made up of individuals, and 7.6% had someone living alone who was 65 years of age or older. The average household size was 2.52 and the average family size was 2.85.

In the township the population was spread out, with 25.6% under the age of 18, 3.0% from 18 to 24, 24.4% from 25 to 44, 33.4% from 45 to 64, and 13.6% who were 65 years of age or older. The median age was 44 years. For every 100 females, there were 107.7 males. For every 100 females age 18 and over, there were 105.7 males.

The median income for a household in the township was $43,438, and the median income for a family was $49,063. Males had a median income of $27,054 versus $24,375 for females. The per capita income for the township was $22,008. About 4.6% of families and 6.1% of the population were below the poverty line, including 7.5% of those under age 18 and 7.8% of those age 65 or over.
