= Everts Township, Otter Tail County, Minnesota =

Everts Township, Minnesota
- Township
- Location of Everts Township, within Otter Tail County, Minnesota

- Location within the state of Minnesota Everts Township, Minnesota (the United States)
- Coordinates: 46°19′41″N 95°44′2″W
- Country: United States
- State: Minnesota
- County: Otter Tail

Area
  - Total: 34.4 sq mi (89.1 km^{2})
  - Land: 23.1 sq mi (59.9 km^{2})
  - Water: 11.2 sq mi (29.1 km^{2})
- Elevation: 1,362 ft (415 m)

Population (2020)
  - Total: 759
  - Density: 32.8/sq mi (12.7/km^{2})
- Time zone: UTC-6 (Central (CST))
  - Summer (DST): UTC-5 (CDT)
- FIPS code: 27-20024
- GNIS feature ID: 0664120

Everts Township is a township in Otter Tail County, Minnesota, United States. The population was 759 at the 2020 census.

Everts Township was organized in 1879, and named for Edmund A. Everts and his son Rezin Everts, early settlers.

== Geography ==
According to the United States Census Bureau, the township has a total area of 34.4 square miles (89 km^{2}), of which 23.1 square miles (60 km^{2}) is land and 11.2 square miles (29 km^{2}) (32.71%) is water.

== Demographics ==
As of the census of 2000, there were 774 people, 310 households, and 249 families residing in the township. The population density was 33.5 inhabitants per square mile (12.9/km^{2}). There were 929 housing units at an average density of 40.2 per square mile (15.5/km^{2}). The racial makeup of the township was 98.58% White, 0.26% African American, 0.13% Native American, 0.26% Asian, 0.13% Pacific Islander, 0.13% from other races, and 0.52% from two or more races. Hispanic or Latino of any race were 0.26% of the population.

There were 310 households, out of which 18.4% had children under the age of 18 living with them, 77.1% were married couples living together, 2.3% had a female householder with no husband present, and 19.4% were non-families. 17.4% of all households were made up of individuals, and 8.4% had someone living alone who was 65 years of age or older. The average household size was 2.30 and the average family size was 2.58.

In the township the population was spread out, with 15.4% under the age of 18, 2.2% from 18 to 24, 17.2% from 25 to 44, 32.4% from 45 to 64, and 32.8% who were 65 years of age or older. The median age was 56 years. For every 100 females, there were 93.0 males. For every 100 females age 18 and over, there were 86.1 males.

The median income for a household in the township was $44,917, and the median income for a family was $52,083. Males had a median income of $35,395 versus $26,250 for females. The per capita income for the township was $27,823. About 1.3% of families and 3.6% of the population were below the poverty line, including 8.2% of those under age 18 and 3.9% of those age 65 or over.
