= Dunvilla, Minnesota =

Dunvilla
- Unincorporated community
- Location within Minnesota Location within the United States
- Coordinates: 46°39′47″N 96°00′58″W
- Country: United States
- State: Minnesota
- County: Otter Tail
- Elevation: 1,329 ft (405 m)
- Time zone: UTC-6 (Central (CST))
  - Summer (DST): UTC-5 (CDT)
- Area code: 218
- GNIS feature ID: 642986

Dunvilla is an unincorporated community in Otter Tail County, Minnesota, United States.

The community is located between Detroit Lakes and Barnesville on Minnesota State Highway 34.

Dunvilla is also located immediately north of Pelican Rapids on U.S. Route 59.
