= Elizabeth Township, Otter Tail County, Minnesota =

Elizabeth Township, Minnesota
- Township
- Location of Elizabeth Township, within Otter Tail County, Minnesota

- Location within the state of Minnesota Elizabeth Township, Minnesota (the United States)
- Coordinates: 46°24′50″N 96°4′57″W
- Country: United States
- State: Minnesota
- County: Otter Tail

Area
  - Total: 35.6 sq mi (92.2 km^{2})
  - Land: 31.9 sq mi (82.5 km^{2})
  - Water: 3.8 sq mi (9.8 km^{2})
- Elevation: 1,260 ft (384 m)

Population (2020)
  - Total: 843
  - Density: 26.5/sq mi (10.2/km^{2})
- Time zone: UTC-6 (Central (CST))
  - Summer (DST): UTC-5 (CDT)
- ZIP code: 56533
- Area code: 218
- FIPS code: 27-18584
- GNIS feature ID: 0664066

Elizabeth Township is a township in Otter Tail County, Minnesota, United States. The population was 843 at the 2020 census.

Elizabeth Township was organized in 1870, and named for Elizabeth Niggler, the wife of an early settler.

== Geography ==
According to the United States Census Bureau, the township has a total area of 35.6 square miles (92 km^{2}), of which 31.8 square miles (82 km^{2}) is land and 3.8 square miles (9.8 km^{2}) (10.59%) is water.

== Demographics ==
As of the census of 2000, there were 722 people, 279 households, and 213 families residing in the township. The population density was 22.7 inhabitants per square mile (8.8/km^{2}). There were 511 housing units at an average density of 16.1 per square mile (6.2/km^{2}). The racial makeup of the township was 99.72% White, 0.14% from other races, and 0.14% from two or more races. Hispanic or Latino of any race were 0.28% of the population.

There were 279 households, out of which 31.5% had children under the age of 18 living with them, 69.2% were married couples living together, 4.7% had a female householder with no husband present, and 23.3% were non-families. 19.7% of all households were made up of individuals, and 7.9% had someone living alone who was 65 years of age or older. The average household size was 2.59 and the average family size was 2.96.

In the township the population was spread out, with 25.3% under the age of 18, 5.3% from 18 to 24, 29.4% from 25 to 44, 24.9% from 45 to 64, and 15.1% who were 65 years of age or older. The median age was 41 years. For every 100 females, there were 108.1 males. For every 100 females age 18 and over, there were 101.1 males.

The median income for a household in the township was $46,719, and the median income for a family was $55,446. Males had a median income of $34,688 versus $28,125 for females. The per capita income for the township was $21,960. About 5.8% of families and 9.0% of the population were below the poverty line, including 14.3% of those under age 18 and 6.9% of those age 65 or over.
