= Eastern Township, Otter Tail County, Minnesota =

Eastern Township, Minnesota
- Township
- Location of Eastern Township, within Otter Tail County, Minnesota

- Location within the state of Minnesota Eastern Township, Minnesota (the United States)
- Coordinates: 46°8′15″N 95°11′52″W
- Country: United States
- State: Minnesota
- County: Otter Tail

Area
  - Total: 36.6 sq mi (94.7 km^{2})
  - Land: 35.3 sq mi (91.5 km^{2})
  - Water: 1.2 sq mi (3.2 km^{2})
- Elevation: 1,437 ft (438 m)

Population (2020)
  - Total: 254
  - Density: 7.19/sq mi (2.78/km^{2})
- Time zone: UTC-6 (Central (CST))
  - Summer (DST): UTC-5 (CDT)
- FIPS code: 27-17576
- GNIS feature ID: 0664026
- Website: https://easterntownship.org/

Eastern Township is a township in Otter Tail County, Minnesota, United States. The population was 254 at the 2020 census.

Eastern Township was organized in 1875, and named from its location on the eastern side of the county.

== Geography ==
According to the United States Census Bureau, the township has a total area of 36.6 square miles (95 km^{2}), of which 35.3 square miles (91 km^{2}) is land and 1.2 square miles (3.1 km^{2}) (3.42%) is water.

== Demographics ==
As of the census of 2000, there were 256 people, 96 households, and 74 families residing in the township. The population density was 7.2 inhabitants per square mile (2.8/km^{2}). There were 114 housing units at an average density of 3.2 per square mile (1.2/km^{2}). The racial makeup of the township was 98.83% White, 0.39% Native American, 0.39% from other races, and 0.39% from two or more races. Hispanic or Latino of any race were 0.78% of the population.

There were 96 households, out of which 35.4% had children under the age of 18 living with them, 68.8% were married couples living together, and 22.9% were non-families. 21.9% of all households were made up of individuals, and 8.3% had someone living alone who was 65 years of age or older. The average household size was 2.67 and the average family size was 3.08.

In the township the population was spread out, with 28.5% under the age of 18, 6.6% from 18 to 24, 25.4% from 25 to 44, 24.6% from 45 to 64, and 14.8% who were 65 years of age or older. The median age was 38 years. For every 100 females, there were 116.9 males. For every 100 females age 18 and over, there were 128.8 males.

The median income for a household in the township was $31,563, and the median income for a family was $40,156. Males had a median income of $21,500 versus $21,500 for females. The per capita income for the township was $17,964. About 11.3% of families and 12.7% of the population were below the poverty line, including 11.9% of those under the age of eighteen and 10.8% of those 65 or over.
