= Norwegian Grove Township, Otter Tail County, Minnesota =

Norwegian Grove Township, Minnesota
- Township
- Location of Norwegian Grove Township, within Otter Tail County, Minnesota

- Location within the state of Minnesota Norwegian Grove Township, Minnesota (the United States)
- Coordinates: 46°35′55″N 96°13′46″W
- Country: United States
- State: Minnesota
- County: Otter Tail

Area
  - Total: 35.6 sq mi (92.3 km^{2})
  - Land: 33.6 sq mi (87.0 km^{2})
  - Water: 2.0 sq mi (5.3 km^{2})
- Elevation: 1,335 ft (407 m)

Population (2020)
  - Total: 340
  - Density: 10/sq mi (3.9/km^{2})
- Time zone: UTC-6 (Central (CST))
  - Summer (DST): UTC-5 (CDT)
- FIPS code: 27-47482
- GNIS feature ID: 0665181

Norwegian Grove Township is a township in Otter Tail County, Minnesota, United States. The population was 340 at the 2020 census.

Norwegian Grove Township was organized in 1873. A large share of the early settlers being natives of Norway caused the name to be selected.

== Geography ==
According to the United States Census Bureau, the township has a total area of 35.7 square miles (92.3 km^{2}), of which 33.6 square miles (87.0 km^{2}) is land and 2.1 square miles (5.3 km^{2}) (5.78%) is water.

== Demographics ==
As of the census of 2000, there were 349 people, 124 households, and 98 families residing in the township. The population density was 10.4 people per square mile (4.0/km^{2}). There were 144 housing units at an average density of 4.3/sq mi (1.7/km^{2}). The racial makeup of the township was 99.43% White, 0.29% Native American, and 0.29% from two or more races.

There were 124 households, out of which 37.1% had children under the age of 18 living with them, 69.4% were married couples living together, 6.5% had a female householder with no husband present, and 20.2% were non-families. 16.1% of all households were made up of individuals, and 9.7% had someone living alone who was 65 years of age or older. The average household size was 2.81 and the average family size was 3.16.

In the township the population was spread out, with 28.1% under the age of 18, 5.4% from 18 to 24, 25.8% from 25 to 44, 25.2% from 45 to 64, and 15.5% who were 65 years of age or older. The median age was 40 years. For every 100 females, there were 120.9 males. For every 100 females age 18 and over, there were 102.4 males.

The median income for a household in the township was $28,571, and the median income for a family was $30,972. Males had a median income of $21,875 versus $20,625 for females. The per capita income for the township was $12,029. About 20.4% of families and 23.8% of the population were below the poverty line, including 32.9% of those under age 18 and 15.6% of those age 65 or over.

== Related Reading ==
- Estensen, Gene War Comes to Norwegian Grove (Telelaget of America)
