= Rush Lake Township, Otter Tail County, Minnesota =

Rush Lake Township, Minnesota
- Township
- Location of Rush Lake Township, within Otter Tail County, Minnesota

- Location within the state of Minnesota Rush Lake Township, Minnesota (the United States)
- Coordinates: 46°29′35″N 95°35′20″W
- Country: United States
- State: Minnesota
- County: Otter Tail

Area
  - Total: 34.7 sq mi (89.9 km^{2})
  - Land: 26.8 sq mi (69.4 km^{2})
  - Water: 7.9 sq mi (20.5 km^{2})
- Elevation: 1,342 ft (409 m)

Population (2020)
  - Total: 1,035
  - Density: 38.6/sq mi (14.9/km^{2})
- Time zone: UTC-6 (Central (CST))
  - Summer (DST): UTC-5 (CDT)
- FIPS code: 27-56320
- GNIS feature ID: 0665489

Rush Lake Township is a township in Otter Tail County, Minnesota, United States. The population was 1,035 at the 2020 census.

Rush Lake Township was organized in 1871.

== Geography ==
According to the United States Census Bureau, the township has a total area of 34.7 square miles (89.8 km^{2}), of which 26.8 square miles (69.4 km^{2}) is land and 7.9 square miles (20.5 km^{2}) (22.80%) is water.

== Demographics ==
As of the census of 2000, there were 966 people, 379 households, and 294 families residing in the township. The population density was 36.1 inhabitants per square mile (13.9/km^{2}). There were 872 housing units at an average density of 32.6 per square mile (12.6/km^{2}). The racial makeup of the township was 98.65% White, 0.21% Native American, 0.10% Asian, 0.21% Pacific Islander, 0.21% from other races, and 0.62% from two or more races. Hispanic or Latino of any race were 0.41% of the population.

There were 379 households, out of which 31.4% had children under the age of 18 living with them, 71.0% were married couples living together, 2.6% had a female householder with no husband present, and 22.2% were non-families. 19.8% of all households were made up of individuals, and 9.2% had someone living alone who was 65 years of age or older. The average household size was 2.55 and the average family size was 2.93.

In the township the population was spread out, with 25.6% under the age of 18, 5.1% from 18 to 24, 21.5% from 25 to 44, 29.5% from 45 to 64, and 18.3% who were 65 years of age or older. The median age was 44 years. For every 100 females, there were 118.6 males. For every 100 females age 18 and over, there were 113.4 males.

The median income for a household in the township was $40,000, and the median income for a family was $46,944. Males had a median income of $32,500 versus $21,538 for females. The per capita income for the township was $19,800. About 4.4% of families and 9.5% of the population were below the poverty line, including 14.6% of those under age 18 and 6.5% of those age 65 or over.
