= Dane Prairie Township, Otter Tail County, Minnesota =

Dane Prairie Township, Minnesota
- Township
- Location of Dane Prairie Township, within Otter Tail County, Minnesota

- Location within the state of Minnesota Dane Prairie Township, Minnesota (the United States)
- Coordinates: 46°14′17″N 95°57′11″W
- Country: United States
- State: Minnesota
- County: Otter Tail

Area
  - Total: 35.8 sq mi (92.7 km^{2})
  - Land: 31.2 sq mi (80.9 km^{2})
  - Water: 4.5 sq mi (11.7 km^{2})
- Elevation: 1,273 ft (388 m)

Population (2020)
  - Total: 883
  - Density: 28.3/sq mi (10.9/km^{2})
- Time zone: UTC-6 (Central (CST))
  - Summer (DST): UTC-5 (CDT)
- FIPS code: 27-14644
- GNIS feature ID: 0663919

Dane Prairie Township is a township in Otter Tail County, Minnesota, United States. The population was 883 at the 2020 census.

Dane Prairie Township was organized in 1870, and named for its prairies originally settled chiefly by natives of Denmark.

== Geography ==
According to the United States Census Bureau, the township has a total area of 35.8 square miles (93 km^{2}), of which 31.2 square miles (81 km^{2}) is land and 4.5 square miles (12 km^{2}) (12.69%) is water.

== Demographics ==
As of the census of 2000, there were 892 people, 359 households, and 282 families residing in the township. The population density was 28.6 inhabitants per square mile (11.0/km^{2}). There were 479 housing units at an average density of 15.3 per square mile (5.9/km^{2}). The racial makeup of the township was 99.22% White, 0.11% African American, 0.45% Asian, and 0.22% from two or more races.

There were 359 households, out of which 29.0% had children under the age of 18 living with them, 74.1% were married couples living together, 2.2% had a female householder with no husband present, and 21.4% were non-families. 18.4% of all households were made up of individuals, and 6.7% had someone living alone who was 65 years of age or older. The average household size was 2.48 and the average family size was 2.85.

In the township the population was spread out, with 22.5% under the age of 18, 4.9% from 18 to 24, 24.2% from 25 to 44, 33.7% from 45 to 64, and 14.6% who were 65 years of age or older. The median age was 44 years. For every 100 females, there were 105.1 males. For every 100 females age 18 and over, there were 106.9 males.

The median income for a household in the township was $47,232, and the median income for a family was $52,426. Males had a median income of $34,750 versus $23,611 for females. The per capita income for the township was $22,630. About 1.1% of families and 3.2% of the population were below the poverty line, including none of those under age 18 and 13.5% of those age 65 or over.
