= Nidaros Township, Otter Tail County, Minnesota =

Nidaros Township, Minnesota
- Township
- Location of Nidaros Township, within Otter Tail County, Minnesota

- Location within the state of Minnesota Nidaros Township, Minnesota (the United States)
- Coordinates: 46°15′33″N 95°34′48″W
- Country: United States
- State: Minnesota
- County: Otter Tail

Area
  - Total: 34.4 sq mi (89.2 km^{2})
  - Land: 30.9 sq mi (80.0 km^{2})
  - Water: 3.6 sq mi (9.3 km^{2})
- Elevation: 1,362 ft (415 m)

Population (2020)
  - Total: 356
  - Density: 11.5/sq mi (4.45/km^{2})
- Time zone: UTC-6 (Central (CST))
  - Summer (DST): UTC-5 (CDT)
- FIPS code: 27-46240
- GNIS feature ID: 0665122

Nidaros Township is a township in Otter Tail County, Minnesota, United States. The population was 356 at the 2020 census.

Nidaros Township was organized in 1871, and named for Nidaros, the former name of the city of Trondheim, Norway.

== Geography ==
According to the United States Census Bureau, the township had a total area of 34.5 square miles (89.3 km^{2}), of which 30.9 square miles (80.0 km^{2}) is land and 3.6 square miles (9.3 km^{2}) (10.39%) is water.

== Demographics ==
As of the census of 2000, there were 317 people, 133 households, and 96 families residing in the township. The population density was 10.3 people per square mile (4.0/km^{2}). There were 308 housing units at an average density of 10.0/sq mi (3.9/km^{2}). The racial makeup of the township was 99.05% White and 0.95% from two or more races. Hispanic or Latino of any race were 0.95% of the population.

There were 133 households, out of which 21.1% had children under the age of 18 living with them, 65.4% were married couples living together, 4.5% had a female householder with no husband present, and 27.1% were non-families. 26.3% of all households were made up of individuals, and 16.5% had someone living alone who was 65 years of age or older. The average household size was 2.38 and the average family size was 2.85.

In the township the population was spread out, with 20.5% under the age of 18, 5.7% from 18 to 24, 19.2% from 25 to 44, 31.2% from 45 to 64, and 23.3% who were 65 years of age or older. The median age was 48 years. For every 100 females, there are 105.8 males. For every 100 females age 18 and over, there were 110.0 males.

The median income for a household in the township was $30,000, and the median income for a family was $37,969. Males had a median income of $31,250 versus $13,500 for females. The per capita income for the township was $16,234. About 2.2% of families and 3.9% of the population were below the poverty line, including 4.2% of those under the age of 18 and 2.4% of those 65 and older.
