= Carlisle Township, Otter Tail County, Minnesota =

Carlisle Township, Minnesota
- Township
- Location of Carlisle Township, within Otter Tail County, Minnesota

- Location within the state of Minnesota Carlisle Township, Minnesota (the United States)
- Coordinates: 46°19′33″N 96°12′27″W
- Country: United States
- State: Minnesota
- County: Otter Tail

Area
  - Total: 35.6 sq mi (92.3 km^{2})
  - Land: 34.8 sq mi (90.2 km^{2})
  - Water: 0.81 sq mi (2.1 km^{2})
- Elevation: 1,180 ft (360 m)

Population (2020)
  - Total: 178
  - Density: 5.11/sq mi (1.97/km^{2})
- Time zone: UTC-6 (Central (CST))
  - Summer (DST): UTC-5 (CDT)
- ZIP code: 56537
- Area code: 218
- FIPS code: 27-09946
- GNIS feature ID: 0663750

Carlisle Township is a township in Otter Tail County, Minnesota, United States. The population was 178 as of the 2020 census.

Carlisle Township was organized in 1881.

== Geography ==
According to the United States Census Bureau, the township has a total area of 35.6 square miles (92 km^{2}), of which 34.8 square miles (90 km^{2}) is land and 0.8 square miles (2.1 km^{2}) (2.27%) is water.

== Demographics ==
As of the census of 2000, there were 219 people, 71 households, and 59 families living in the township. The population density was 6.3 inhabitants per square mile (2.4/km^{2}). There were 77 housing units at an average density of 2.2 per square mile (0.85/km^{2}). The racial makeup of the township was 98.17% White, and 1.83% from two or more races. Hispanic or Latino of any race were 1.37% of the population.

There were 71 households, out of which 43.7% had children under the age of 18 living with them, 73.2% were married couples living together, 8.5% had a female householder with no husband present, and 15.5% were non-families. 14.1% of all households were made up of individuals, and 4.2% had someone living alone who was 65 years of age or older. The average household size was 3.08 and the average family size was 3.43.

In the township the population was spread out, with 33.3% under the age of 18, 7.8% from 18 to 24, 23.7% from 25 to 44, 22.4% from 45 to 64, and 12.8% who were 65 years of age or older. The median age was 38 years. For every 100 females, there were 100.9 males. For every 100 females age 18 and over, there were 105.6 males.

The median income for a household in the township was $41,500, and the median income for a family was $48,438. Males had a median income of $28,750 versus $20,000 for females. The per capita income for the township was $15,094. None of the population or families were below the poverty line.
