= Edna Township, Otter Tail County, Minnesota =

Township in Minnesota

Edna Township, Minnesota
- Township
- Location of Edna Township, within Otter Tail County, Minnesota

- Location within the state of Minnesota Edna Township, Minnesota (the United States)
- Coordinates: 46°34′54″N 95°43′23″W
- Country: United States
- State: Minnesota
- County: Otter Tail

Area
  - Total: 34.7 sq mi (89.9 km^{2})
  - Land: 26.2 sq mi (67.8 km^{2})
  - Water: 8.5 sq mi (22.0 km^{2})
- Elevation: 1,352 ft (412 m)

Population (2020)
  - Total: 905
  - Density: 34.6/sq mi (13.3/km^{2})
- Time zone: UTC-6 (Central (CST))
  - Summer (DST): UTC-5 (CDT)
- FIPS code: 27-18224
- GNIS feature ID: 0664050
- Website: https://www.ednatownshipmn.gov/

Edna Township is a township in Otter Tail County, Minnesota, United States. The population was 905 at the 2020 census.

Edna Township was organized in 1882.

== Geography ==
According to the United States Census Bureau, the township has a total area of 34.7 square miles (90 km^{2}), of which 26.2 square miles (68 km^{2}) is land and 8.5 square miles (22 km^{2}) (24.52%) is water.

== Demographics ==
As of the census of 2000, there were 921 people, 354 households, and 281 families living in the township. The population density was 35.2 inhabitants per square mile (13.6/km^{2}). There were 743 housing units at an average density of 28.4 per square mile (11.0/km^{2}). The racial makeup of the township was 98.59% White, 0.33% African American, 0.33% Native American, and 0.76% from two or more races. Hispanic or Latino of any race were 0.76% of the population.

There were 354 households, out of which 29.9% had children under the age of 18 living with them, 70.6% were married couples living together, 4.2% had a female householder with no husband present, and 20.6% were non-families. 18.4% of all households were made up of individuals, and 7.6% had someone living alone who was 65 years of age or older. The average household size was 2.59 and the average family size was 2.93.

In the township the population was spread out, with 26.3% under the age of 18, 3.7% from 18 to 24, 22.4% from 25 to 44, 30.7% from 45 to 64, and 16.9% who were 65 years of age or older. The median age was 43 years. For every 100 females, there were 101.1 males. For every 100 females age 18 and over, there were 103.3 males.

The median income for a household in the township was $40,625, and the median income for a family was $43,068. Males had a median income of $36,042 versus $20,694 for females. The per capita income for the township was $19,847. About 6.1% of families and 7.2% of the population were below the poverty line, including 9.7% of those under age 18 and 3.8% of those age 65 or over.
