= Otter Tail County, Minnesota =

County in Minnesota, United States

- County
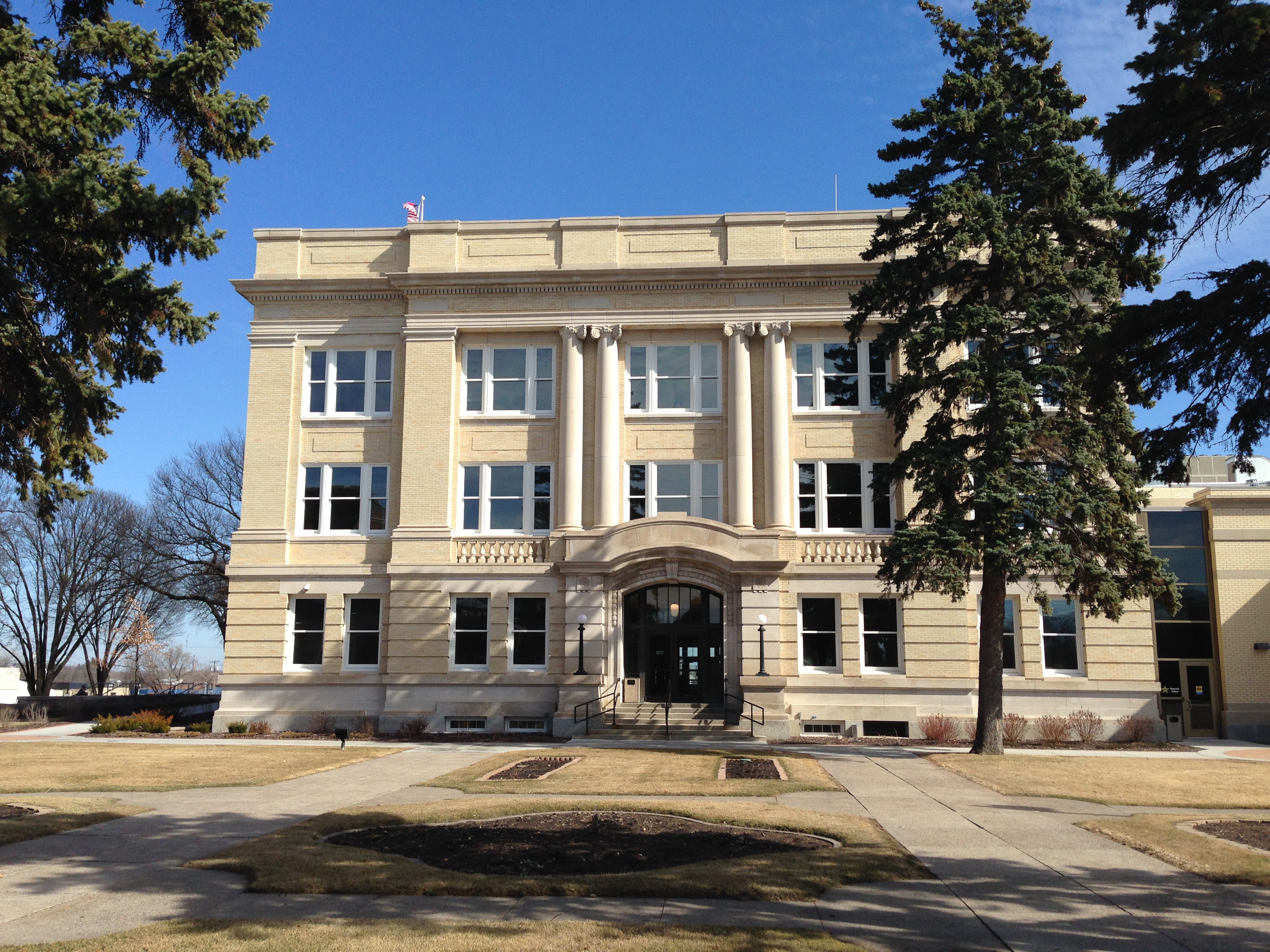
- The Otter Tail County Courthouse in Fergus Falls

- Location within the U.S. state of Minnesota
- Coordinates: 46.405727°N 95.714581°W
- Country: United States
- State: Minnesota
- Founded: March 18, 1858 (created); September 12, 1868 (organized)
- Named for: Otter Tail Lake and Otter Tail River
- Seat: Fergus Falls
- Largest city: Fergus Falls

Area
  - Total: 2,224.328 sq mi (5,760.98 km^{2})
  - Land: 1,971.635 sq mi (5,106.51 km^{2})
  - Water: 252.693 sq mi (654.47 km^{2}) 11.36%

Population (2020)
  - Total: 60,081
  - Estimate (2025): 61,041 ▲
  - Density: 31/sq mi (12/km^{2})
- Time zone: UTC−6 (Central)
  - Summer (DST): UTC−5 (CDT)
- Area code: 218
- Congressional district: 7th
- Website: ottertailcounty.gov

Otter Tail County is a county in the U.S. state of Minnesota. As of the 2020 census, the population was 60,081, and it was estimated at 61,041 in 2025. The county seat and the largest city is Fergus Falls.

Otter Tail County comprises the Fergus Falls micropolitan statistical area. With 1,048, Otter Tail County has more lakes than any other county in the United States.

== History ==
Native Americans used the area for hunting and fishing and had permanent dwelling sites. Two Native American tribes were in constant conflict. The Dakota (Sioux) were being pushed from their home area by the Ojibwe (Chippewa) during the late 18th and early 19th centuries. Burial mounds and artifacts can still be found. Some of the oldest Native American remains were found near Pelican Rapids, Minnesota. The remains, nicknamed Minnesota Girl, were dated at about 11,000 BC.

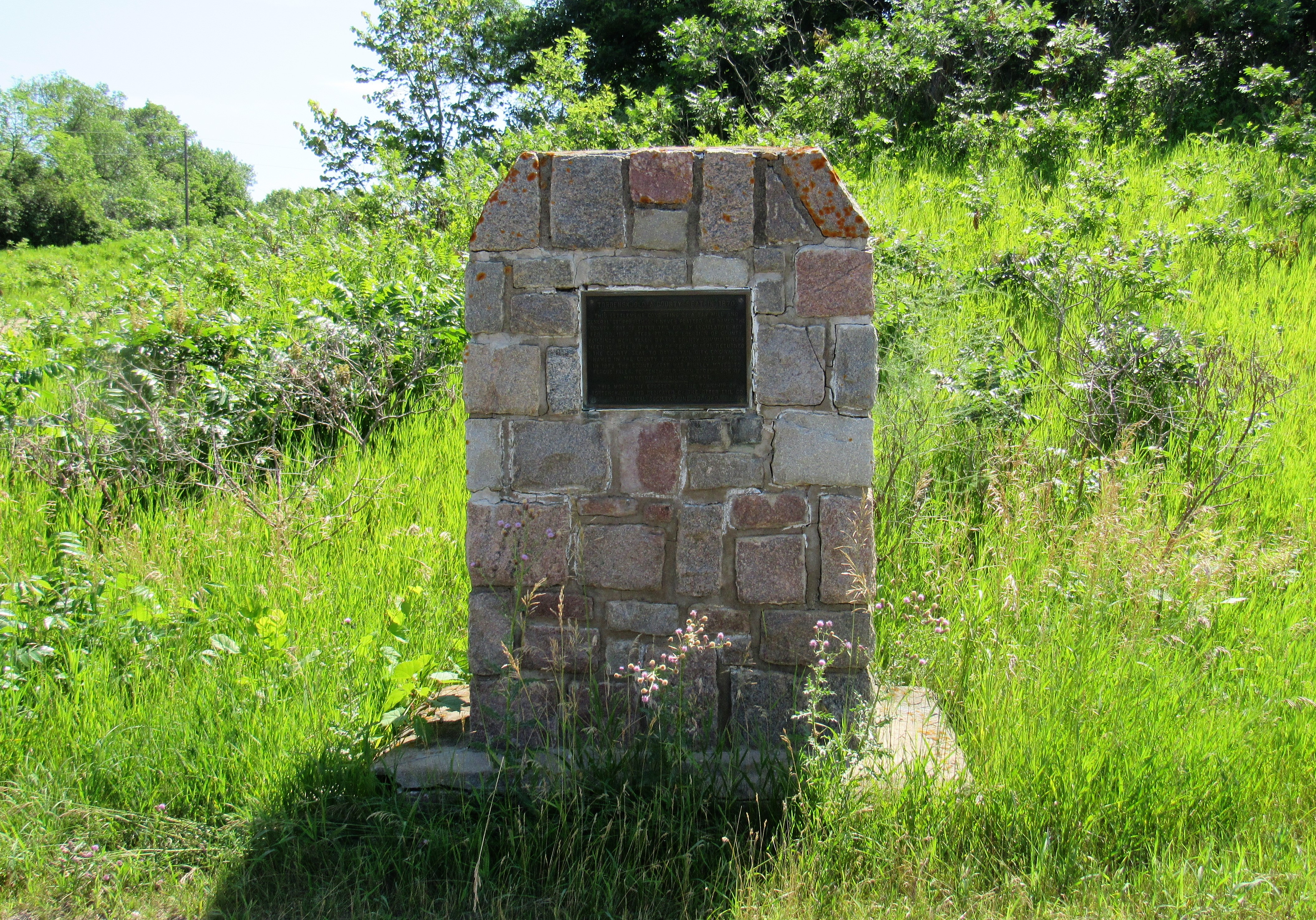
Historic marker for Tordenskjold, which was made the county seat in 1870 by the Minnesota legislature, a decision rescinded the following year

The first Europeans to enter the county were French and British fur traders. Efforts were made to set up trading posts on the Leaf Lakes and Otter Tail Lake. In the late 19th century, most of the towns were built along the railroad lines. Lumber and agriculture were the major industries in the county at that time. The pine and hardwood forests, transportation system, and markets were instrumental in the development of Fergus Falls into a lumber center. The Wisconsin Territory was established by the federal government effective July 3, 1836, and existed until its eastern portion was granted statehood (as Wisconsin) in 1848. The federal government set up the Minnesota Territory effective March 3, 1849. The newly organized territorial legislature created nine counties across the territory in October 1849. One of those counties, Dakota, had a section partitioned off in 1851 to create Cass County. On March 18, 1858, the outgoing territorial legislature created Otter Tail County from areas partitioned from Cass and Pembina, another of the original counties created in 1849. The county was named for Otter Tail Lake and the Otter Tail River. The county was not organized in 1858, nor was a county seat specified. On September 12, 1868, the legislature completed the county organization, and specified Otter Tail City as county seat.

Otter Tail City began as a waystation on a fur-trade route between Saint Paul and the Red River valley. The settlement was of sufficient size that when the Minnesota Territory established a U.S. land office for this part of the territory, the office was sited at Otter Tail City. Thus the city was named as the seat when the county was organized, but people had begun settling the future Fergus Falls area in 1857, and it grew sufficiently that in fall 1872, the vote was taken to move the county seat there. The Northern Pacific Railroad had initially planned to run a line through Otter Tail City, but complications caused the line to be placed in Fergus Falls, which precipitated the county seat move. The Soo Line later made plans to run a line through Otter Tail City, but when townspeople could not agree on the routing, another route east of the city was constructed. Thus, a new city plat was generated, with the settlement name changing to Ottertail.

In 1870, the population of the county was about 2,000. At that time, the principal languages spoken in the county were Norwegian, Swedish, German, and English.

The people of Fergus Falls organized a new county named Holcomb. In 1872, a legislative act abolished Holcomb County, added additional townships to the west, and established Fergus Falls as Otter Tail County's seat.

=== Early telephone ===
The Fergus Falls Telephone Exchange Company organized on March 20, 1882, and was in a room at the First National Bank at the corner of Cascade and Lincoln. The system install was very crude. Efforts were made to have telephones installed in the courthouse but commissioners deemed it unnecessary. Eventually a telephone was installed in the auditor's office through a combination of private and public funds. A clerk in the office was tasked with tracking down the officer who was called. The business was sold to the Northwestern Telephone Exchange Company in 1883.

== Geography ==
The Otter Tail River flows south and west through the central and western parts of the county on its way to form the Red River in Wilkin County. It is joined by the south-flowing Pelican River west of Fergus Falls. The Leaf River rises in the county and flows east to its confluence with the Crow Wing River in neighboring Wadena County. The Redeye River flows southeast through the county's northeast section toward its confluence with the Leaf in Wadena. The county terrain consists of rolling hills, heavily wooded through its center section, dotted with lakes and ponds, and carved with drainages and gullies. The available area is devoted to agriculture. The county terrain slopes to the west and south. The highest points on the county terrain are at two different locations: Inspiration Peak, at 1,727 ft (526 m), and Pekan Peak (unofficial name) a summit northeast of the village of Urbank in Folden Township, Section 32, at 1,800 ft (550 m) above sea level.

According to the United States Census Bureau, the county has an area of 2,224.328 square miles (5,760.98 km^{2}), of which 1,971.635 square miles (5,106.51 km^{2}) is land and 252.693 square miles (654.47 km^{2}) (11.36%) is water. It is Minnesota's 7th-largest county by area.

Otter Tail is one of 17 Minnesota savanna region counties with more savanna soils than either forest or prairie soils. According to its website, the county contains over 1,000 lakes.

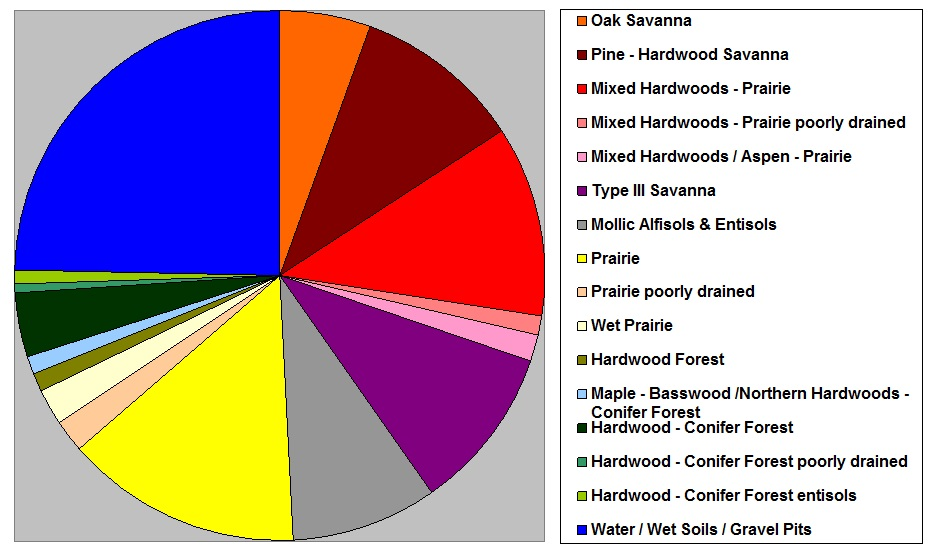
Soils of Otter Tail County

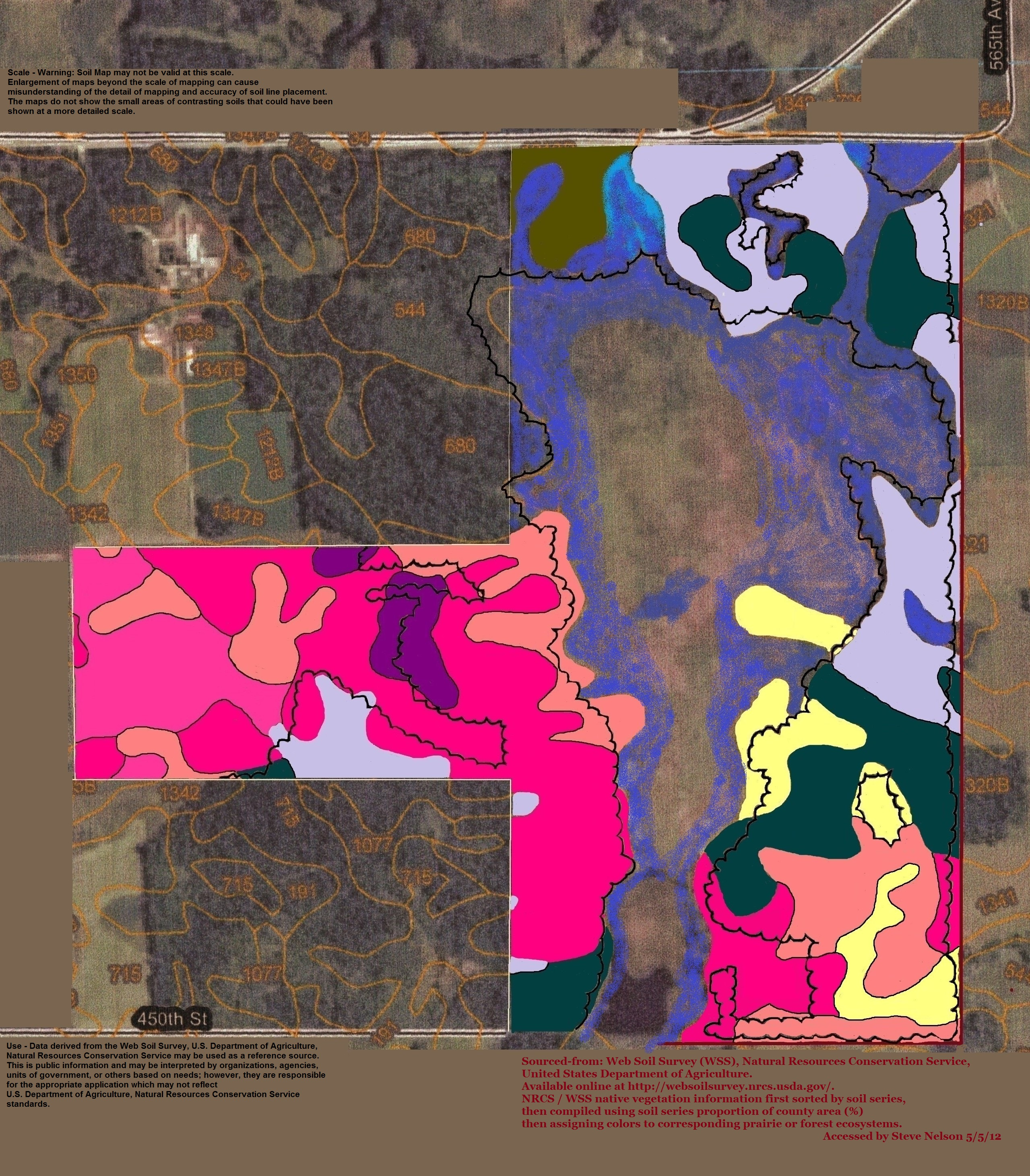
Soils of Bluff Creek WMA area

== Transportation ==
=== Major highways ===
- I-94
- US 10
- US 52
- US 59
- MN 29
- MN 34
- MN 78
- MN 106
- MN 108
- MN 210

=== Airports ===
- Aerovilla Airport – 2 miles (3.2 km) NW of Perham
- Battle Lake Municipal Airport – 1.6 miles (2.6 km) NNE of Battle Lake
- Fergus Falls Municipal Airport (FFM) – 3.8 miles (6.1 km) W of Fergus Falls
- Henning Municipal Airport (05Y) – 1.1 miles (1.8 km) S of Henning
- Pelican Rapids Municipal Airport (47Y) – 4.6 miles (7.4 km) NNW of Pelican Rapids
- Perham Municipal Airport (16D) – 1 mile (1.6 km) NW of Perham
- Wadena Municipal Airport (ADC) – 3.4 miles (5.5 km) W of Wadena

=== Adjacent counties ===
- Becker County – north
- Wadena County – northeast
- Todd County – southeast
- Douglas County – south
- Grant County – southwest
- Wilkin County – west
- Clay County – northwest

=== Protected areas ===
- Aastad State Wildlife Management Area
- Amor State Wildlife Management Area
- Bluff Creek State Wildlife Management Area
- Davies State Wildlife Management Area
- Dead Lake State Wildlife Management Area
- Doran State Wildlife Management Area
- Eagle Lake State Wildlife Management Area
- Eastern Township State Wildlife Management Area
- Elmo State Wildlife Management Area
- Folden Woods State Wildlife Management Area
- Glendalough State Park
- Hi-View State Wildlife Management Area
- Inman State Wildlife Management Area
- Inspiration Peak State Wayside Park
- Jensen Memorial State Wildlife Management Area
- Maplewood State Park
- Orwell State Wildlife Management Area
- Otter Tail Prairie Scientific and Natural Area
- Prairie Ridge State Wildlife Management Area
- Valdine State Wildlife Management Area

== Demographics ==
Historical population
Census	Pop.	Note	%±
1860	240		—
1870	1,968		720.0%
1880	18,675		848.9%
1890	34,232		83.3%
1900	45,375		32.6%
1910	46,036		1.5%
1920	50,818		10.4%
1930	51,006		0.4%
1940	53,192		4.3%
1950	51,320		−3.5%
1960	48,960		−4.6%
1970	46,097		−5.8%
1980	51,937		12.7%
1990	50,714		−2.4%
2000	57,159		12.7%
2010	57,303		0.3%
2020	60,081		4.8%
2025 (est.)	61,041	▲	1.6%
U.S. Decennial Census:

As of the fourth quarter of 2024, the median home value in Otter Tail County was $270,005.

As of the 2023 American Community Survey, there are 25,181 estimated households in Otter Tail County with an average of 2.34 persons per household. The county has a median household income of $70,912. Approximately 10.6% of the county's population lives at or below the poverty line. Otter Tail County has an estimated 61.2% employment rate, with 27.4% of the population holding a bachelor's degree or higher and 94.0% holding a high school diploma.

The top five reported ancestries (people were allowed to report up to two ancestries, thus the figures will generally add to more than 100%) were English (95.7%), Spanish (2.5%), Indo-European (1.1%), Asian and Pacific Islander (0.1%), and Other (0.6%).

Otter Tail County, Minnesota – racial and ethnic composition
Note: the US Census treats Hispanic/Latino as an ethnic category. This table excludes Latinos from the racial categories and assigns them to a separate category. Hispanics/Latinos may be of any race.

Race / ethnicity (NH = non-Hispanic)	Pop. 1980	Pop. 1990	Pop. 2000	Pop. 2010	Pop. 2020
White alone (NH)	51,468 (99.10%)	50,052 (98.69%)	55,137 (96.46%)	54,244 (94.66%)	54,362 (90.48%)
Black or African American alone (NH)	24 (0.05%)	27 (0.05%)	160 (0.28%)	422 (0.74%)	843 (1.40%)
Native American or Alaska Native alone (NH)	121 (0.23%)	226 (0.45%)	269 (0.47%)	261 (0.46%)	284 (0.47%)
Asian alone (NH)	134 (0.26%)	182 (0.36%)	250 (0.44%)	264 (0.46%)	334 (0.56%)
Pacific Islander alone (NH)	—	—	13 (0.02%)	29 (0.05%)	17 (0.03%)
Other race alone (NH)	48 (0.09%)	3 (0.01%)	5 (0.01%)	13 (0.02%)	149 (0.25%)
Mixed race or multiracial (NH)	—	—	368 (0.64%)	580 (1.01%)	1,876 (3.12%)
Hispanic or Latino (any race)	142 (0.27%)	224 (0.44%)	957 (1.67%)	1,490 (2.60%)	2,216 (3.69%)
Total	51,937 (100.00%)	50,714 (100.00%)	57,159 (100.00%)	57,303 (100.00%)	60,081 (100.00%)

=== 2024 estimate ===
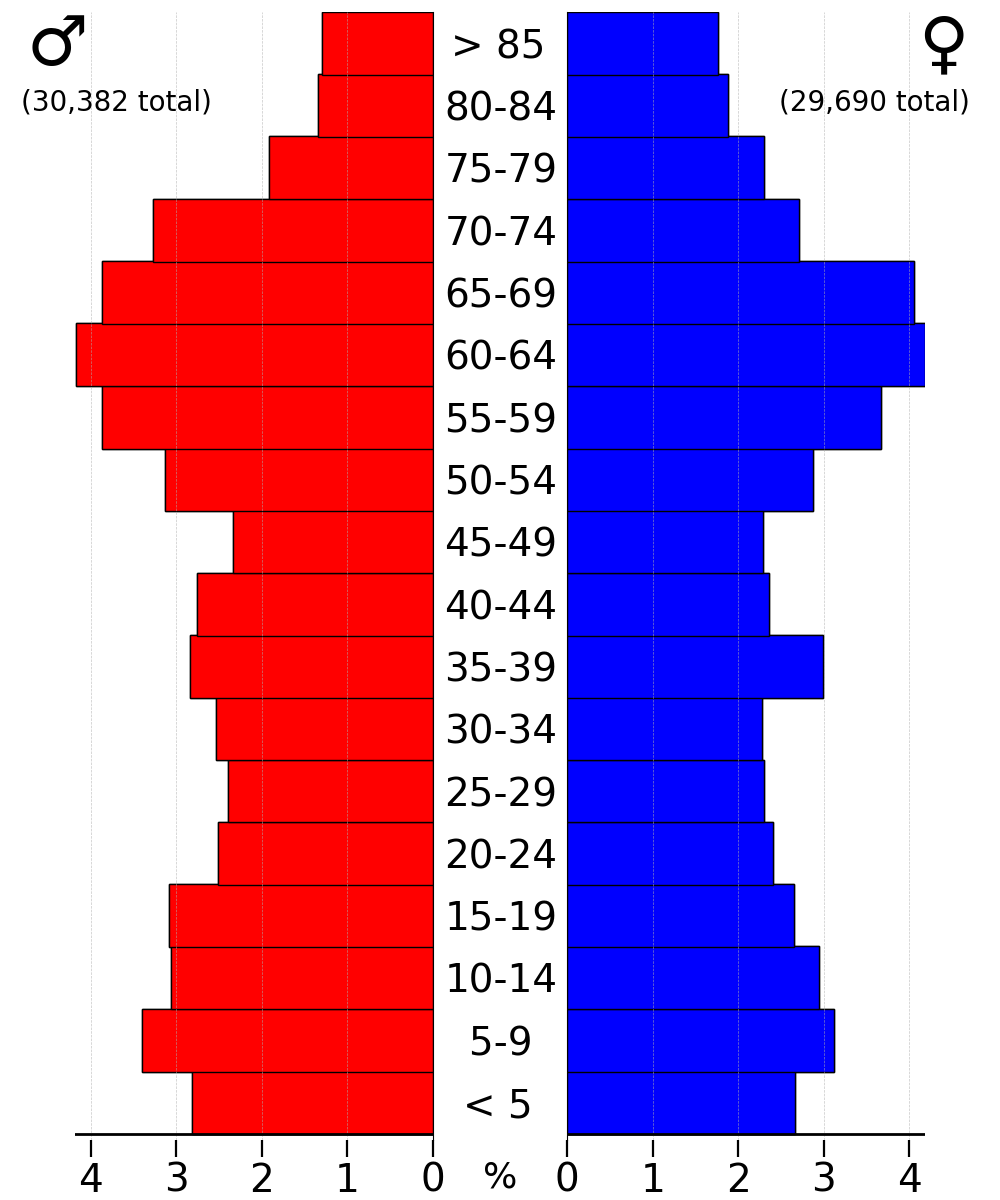
2022 U.S. Census population pyramid for Otter Tail County, from ACS 5-year estimates

As of the 2024 estimate, there were 60,884 people and 25,181 households residing in the county. There were 36,922 housing units at an average density of 18.73 per square mile (7.2/km^{2}). The racial makeup of the county was 95.3% White (92.0% NH White), 1.6% African American, 0.8% Native American, 0.5% Asian, 0.1% Pacific Islander, _% from some other races and 1.6% from two or more races. Hispanic or Latino people of any race were 3.9% of the population.

=== 2020 census ===
As of the 2020 census, the county had a population of 60,081. The median age was 46.2 years. 21.7% of residents were under the age of 18 and 24.9% of residents were 65 years of age or older. For every 100 females there were 101.6 males, and for every 100 females age 18 and over there were 100.7 males age 18 and over.

The racial makeup of the county was 91.4% White, 1.4% Black or African American, 0.5% American Indian and Alaska Native, 0.6% Asian, <0.1% Native Hawaiian and Pacific Islander, 1.8% from some other race, and 4.3% from two or more races. Hispanic or Latino residents of any race comprised 3.7% of the population.

22.1% of residents lived in urban areas, while 77.9% lived in rural areas.

There were 25,123 households in the county, of which 24.7% had children under the age of 18 living in them. Of all households, 54.3% were married-couple households, 18.7% were households with a male householder and no spouse or partner present, and 20.8% were households with a female householder and no spouse or partner present. About 29.3% of all households were made up of individuals and 14.5% had someone living alone who was 65 years of age or older.

There were 36,506 housing units, of which 31.2% were vacant. Among occupied housing units, 78.2% were owner-occupied and 21.8% were renter-occupied. The homeowner vacancy rate was 1.3% and the rental vacancy rate was 8.7%.

=== 2010 census ===
As of the 2010 census, there were 57,303 people, 24,055 households, and _ families residing in the county. The population density was 29.1 inhabitants per square mile (11.2/km^{2}). There were 35,594 housing units at an average density of 18.05 per square mile (7.0/km^{2}). The racial makeup of the county was 96.12% White, 0.75% African American, 0.49% Native American, 0.47% Asian, 0.06% Pacific Islander, 0.89% from some other races and 1.22% from two or more races. Hispanic or Latino people of any race were 2.60% of the population.

=== 2000 census ===
As of the 2000 census, there were 57,159 people, 22,671 households, and 15,779 families in the county. The population density was 29.0 inhabitants per square mile (11.2/km^{2}). There were 33,862 housing units at an average density of 17.0 per square mile (6.6/km^{2}). The racial makeup of the county was 97.11% White, 0.29% African American, 0.51% Native American, 0.44% Asian, 0.05% Pacific Islander, 0.84% from some other races and 0.78% from two or more races. Hispanic or Latino people of any race were 1.67% of the population.

In terms of ancestry, 35.5% were of German and 31.2% Norwegian.

There were 22,671 households, out of which 30.3% had children under the age of 18 living with them, 60.1% were married couples living together, 6.1% had a female householder with no husband present, and 30.4% were non-families. 26.6% of all households were made up of individuals, and 13.30% had someone living alone who was 65 years of age or older. The average household size was 2.46 and the average family size was 2.98.

The county population contained 24.9% under the age of 18, 7.2% from 18 to 24, 24.2% from 25 to 44, 24.7% from 45 to 64, and 19.0% who were 65 years of age or older. The median age was 41 years. For every 100 females there were 100.4 males. For every 100 females age 18 and over, there were 97.8 males.

The median income for a household in the county was $35,395, and the median income for a family was $42,740. Males had a median income of $30,151 versus $20,930 for females. The per capita income for the county was $18,014. About 6.7% of families and 10.1% of the population were below the poverty line, including 12.1% of those under age 18 and 11.1% of those age 65 or over.

== Politics ==
United States presidential election results for Otter Tail County, Minnesota
Year	Republican		Democratic		Third party(ies)	
Year	No.	%	No.	%	No.	%
1892	2,140	37.40%	1,642	28.70%	1,940	33.90%
1896	3,544	42.73%	4,482	54.04%	268	3.23%
1900	3,446	47.19%	3,257	44.60%	600	8.22%
1904	4,642	73.69%	869	13.80%	788	12.51%
1908	3,964	58.07%	2,320	33.99%	542	7.94%
1912	755	11.53%	1,739	26.57%	4,052	61.90%
1916	4,328	54.33%	2,858	35.88%	780	9.79%
1920	11,084	78.50%	1,741	12.33%	1,294	9.16%
1924	7,557	55.45%	568	4.17%	5,504	40.38%
1928	11,624	68.28%	4,990	29.31%	411	2.41%
1932	7,416	43.72%	8,805	51.90%	743	4.38%
1936	8,899	49.14%	8,642	47.72%	569	3.14%
1940	13,737	63.51%	7,705	35.62%	187	0.86%
1944	12,351	67.55%	5,823	31.85%	110	0.60%
1948	11,131	61.25%	6,546	36.02%	495	2.72%
1952	16,447	75.03%	5,388	24.58%	86	0.39%
1956	12,764	65.88%	6,571	33.91%	40	0.21%
1960	13,747	62.94%	8,054	36.87%	42	0.19%
1964	10,542	51.26%	9,997	48.61%	26	0.13%
1968	12,483	60.30%	7,400	35.75%	818	3.95%
1972	13,519	62.21%	7,881	36.27%	331	1.52%
1976	12,113	49.42%	11,881	48.47%	516	2.11%
1980	15,091	57.74%	9,108	34.85%	1,939	7.42%
1984	15,664	61.30%	9,714	38.02%	173	0.68%
1988	14,015	56.96%	10,373	42.16%	216	0.88%
1992	11,074	41.52%	9,176	34.41%	6,420	24.07%
1996	11,808	45.68%	10,519	40.69%	3,523	13.63%
2000	16,963	59.50%	9,844	34.53%	1,704	5.98%
2004	19,734	61.33%	12,038	37.41%	406	1.26%
2008	18,077	55.30%	13,856	42.39%	754	2.31%
2012	18,860	59.55%	12,165	38.41%	645	2.04%
2016	20,939	64.43%	9,340	28.74%	2,221	6.83%
2020	23,800	65.39%	11,958	32.85%	641	1.76%
2024	24,276	66.08%	11,752	31.99%	708	1.93%

Otter Tail is a Republican stronghold in U.S. presidential elections, having voted for the party's nominees in every election since 1936. The only Democrats to win the county since Minnesota became a state in 1858 were Franklin D. Roosevelt in his first election victory and William Jennings Bryan in 1896.

During the Great Depression, there was a communist faction within the county. The areas where the movement was centered are quite desolate today, but in mid-1932 over 900 people were involved in one of the state's communist organizations at what was a historic low point for farmers. Party members were very active in the New York Mills area of Newton, Leaf Lake, Blowers, Deer Creek and Paddock Townships. They held meetings, recruited members, placed candidates on local and state tickets, and distributed propaganda. They held dances in Heinola, Menahga, and Sebeka where the Soviet hammer and sickle were proudly displayed and ran a summer camp on East Leaf Lake.

By the time Roosevelt implemented his New Deal programs in the county, the communist movement began to lose steam. Moreover, the Winter War between Finland and the U.S.S.R. soured many Finnish immigrants on communism (Finns had been a large proportion of the local communists). Carl Peltoniemi, a former local communist, said, "The communist movement within the Finnish community basically ended at the start of the Winter War in 1939–1940."

== Communities ==
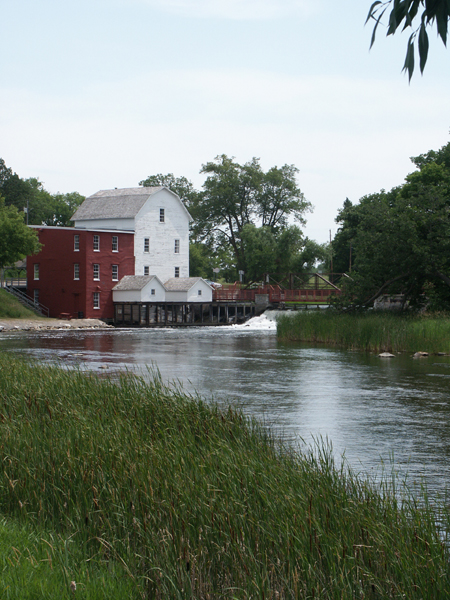
The Otter Tail River at Phelps Mill. June 2004

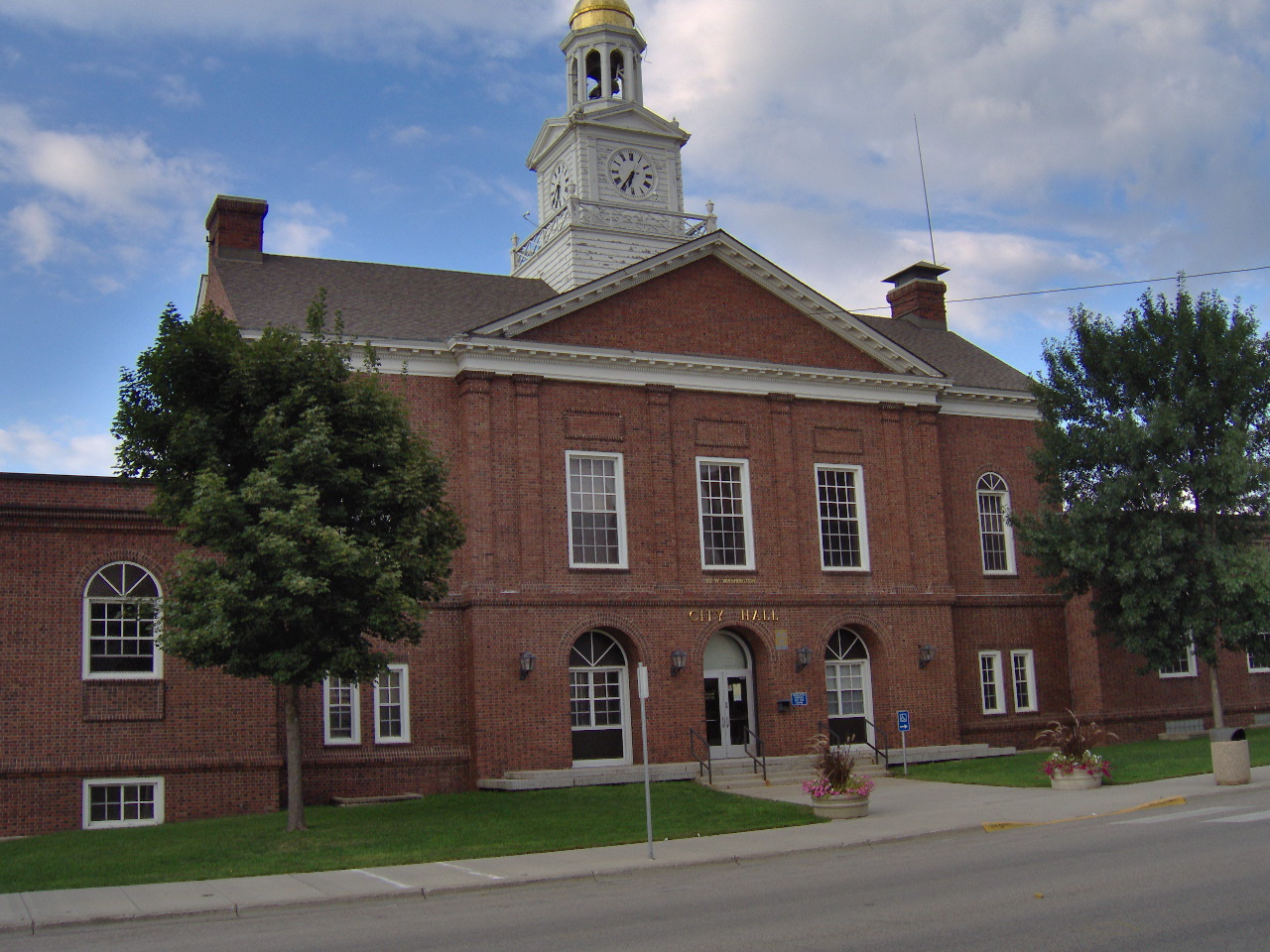
Fergus Falls City Hall in Fergus Falls

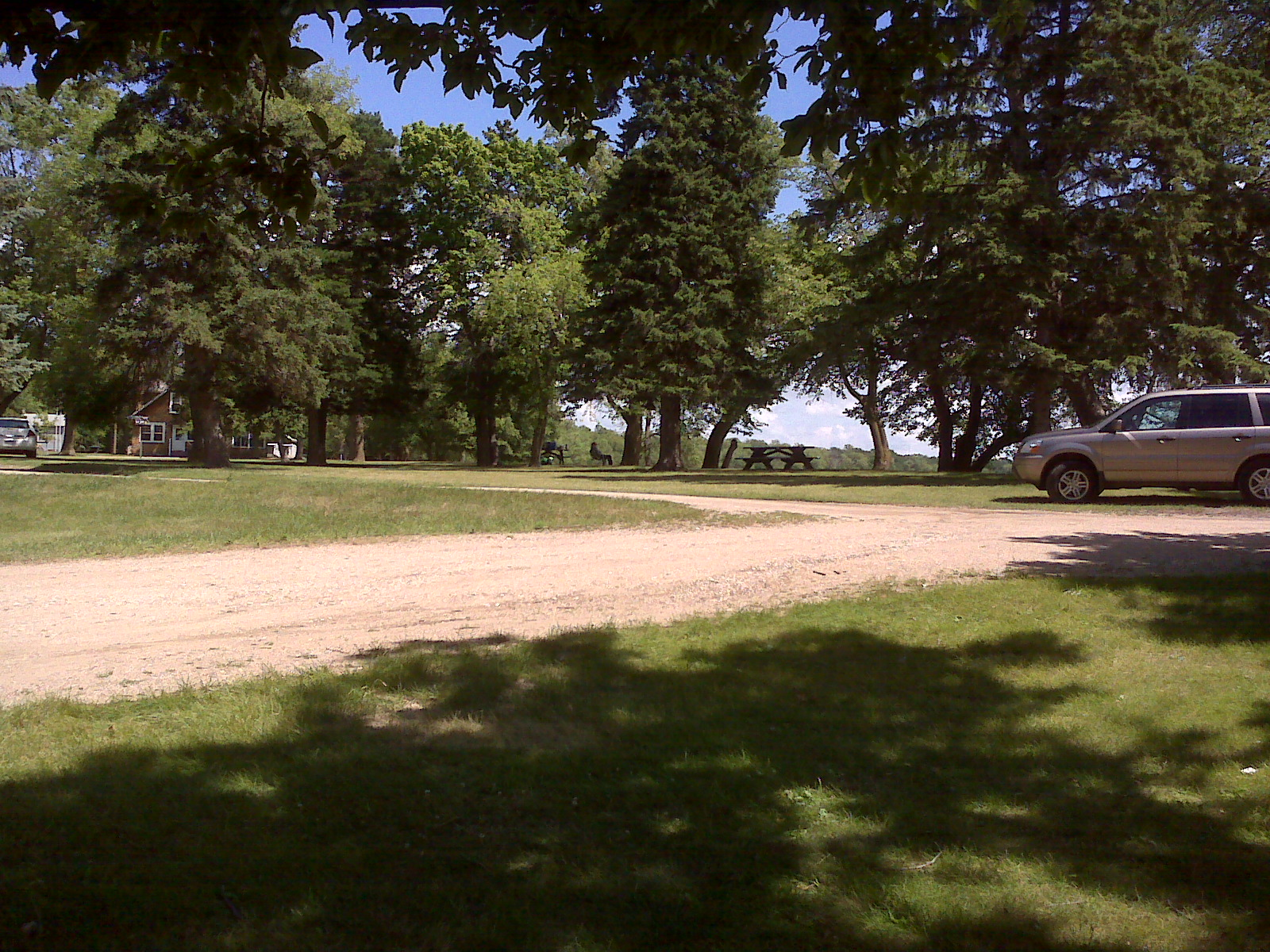
A picnic/beach area in Glendalough State Park. July 2010

=== Cities ===
- Battle Lake
- Bluffton
- Clitherall
- Dalton
- Deer Creek
- Dent
- Elizabeth
- Erhard
- Fergus Falls (county seat)
- Henning
- New York Mills
- Ottertail
- Parkers Prairie
- Pelican Rapids
- Perham
- Richville
- Rothsay (part)
- Underwood
- Urbank
- Vergas
- Vining
- Wadena (part)

=== Unincorporated communities ===
- Butler
- Carlisle
- Dunvilla
- Heinola
- Luce
- Parkton
- Richdale
- Topelius
- Wall Lake
- Woodland Park
- Wrightstown

Townships of Otter Tail County

=== Townships ===
- Aastad Township
- Amor Township
- Aurdal Township
- Blowers Township
- Bluffton Township
- Buse Township
- Butler Township
- Candor Township
- Carlisle Township
- Clitherall Township
- Compton Township
- Corliss Township
- Dane Prairie Township
- Dead Lake Township
- Deer Creek Township
- Dora Township
- Dunn Township
- Eagle Lake Township
- Eastern Township
- Edna Township
- Effington Township
- Elizabeth Township
- Elmo Township
- Erhards Grove Township
- Everts Township
- Fergus Falls Township
- Folden Township
- Friberg Township
- Girard Township
- Gorman Township
- Henning Township
- Hobart Township
- Homestead Township
- Inman Township
- Leaf Lake Township
- Leaf Mountain Township
- Lida Township
- Maine Township
- Maplewood Township
- Newton Township
- Nidaros Township
- Norwegian Grove Township
- Oak Valley Township
- Orwell Township
- Oscar Township
- Otter Tail Township
- Otto Township
- Paddock Township
- Parkers Prairie Township
- Pelican Township
- Perham Township
- Pine Lake Township
- Rush Lake Township
- Scambler Township
- St. Olaf Township
- Star Lake Township
- Sverdrup Township
- Tordenskjold Township
- Trondhjem Township
- Tumuli Township
- Western Township
- Woodside Township

== Education ==
School districts include:

- Ashby Public School District
- Barnesville Public School District
- Battle Lake Public School District
- Bertha-Hewitt Public School District
- Brandon-Evansville Public Schools
- Breckenridge Public School District
- Campbell-Tintah Public School District
- Detroit Lakes Public School District
- Fergus Falls Public School District
- Frazee-Vergas Public School District
- Henning Public School District
- Lake Park Audubon School District
- Menahga Public School District
- New York Mills Public School District
- Parkers Prairie Public School District
- Pelican Rapids Public School District
- Perham-Dent Public School District
- Rothsay Public School District
- Sebeka Public School District
- Underwood Public School District
- Wadena-Deer Creek School District
- West Central Area School District

== See also ==
- National Register of Historic Places listings in Otter Tail County, Minnesota
