= Dora Township, Minnesota =

- Township
- Location of Dora Township, within Otter Tail County, Minnesota

- Location within the state of Minnesota Dora Township, Minnesota (the United States)
- Coordinates: 46°35′26″N 95°49′54″W
- Country: United States
- State: Minnesota
- County: Otter Tail

Area
  - Total: 35.8 sq mi (92.8 km^{2})
  - Land: 29.0 sq mi (75.0 km^{2})
  - Water: 6.9 sq mi (17.9 km^{2})
- Elevation: 1,394 ft (425 m)

Population (2020)
  - Total: 697
  - Density: 24/sq mi (9.3/km^{2})
- Time zone: UTC-6 (Central (CST))
  - Summer (DST): UTC-5 (CDT)
- FIPS code: 27-16120
- GNIS feature ID: 0663992
- Website: https://doratownship.org/

Dora Township is a township in Otter Tail County, Minnesota, United States. The population was 697 at the 2020 census.

== History ==
Dora Township was organized on July 22, 1879, and was named in 1879 after Isadora Sedalia (Woodruff) Thomas, one of the first settlers in the area. Dora and her husband Ellis took a homestead in 1876 near the intersection of County Roads 4 and 41.

Many of the original settlers in the township were Germans who came in the 1880s.

=== Early religious organizations ===
The First Congregational Church of West Dora was incorporated in 1889. Dora Presbyterian Church incorporated in 1902. The Evangelical Lutheran Church, St. John's congregation, was incorporated in 1915.

== Geography ==
According to the United States Census Bureau, the township has a total area of 35.8 square miles (93 km^{2}), of which 28.9 square miles (75 km^{2}) is land and 6.9 square miles (18 km^{2}) (19.24%) is water. Twenty-five lakes are entirely within the boundaries of the township with eight lakes extending into it. Spirit, Loon, Big McDonald, Silent Lakes and Lake Loon are the five largest of the lakes.

== Demographics ==
As of the census of 2020, there were 697 people, 268 households, and 201 families residing in the township. The population density was 24.1 inhabitants per square mile (9.3/km^{2}). There were 891 housing units at an average density of 30.8 per square mile (11.9/km^{2}). The racial makeup of the township was 94.40% White, 0.29% Asian, and 4.30% from two or more races. Hispanic or Latino of any race were 1.7% of the population. There were 268 households, out of which 10.8% had children under the age of 18 living with them, 71.3% were married couples living together, 3.0% had a female householder with no husband present, and 25.0% were non-families. 10.4% had someone living alone who was 65 years of age or older. The average household size was 2.07 and the average family size was 2.41.

In the township the population was spread out, with 8.6% under the age of 18, 1.6% from 18 to 24, 9.2% from 25 to 44, 28.8% from 45 to 64, and 31.4% who were 65 years of age or older. The median age was 60 years. For every 100 females, there were 122.9 males. For every 100 females age 18 and over, there were 118.3 males.

The median income for a household in the township was $67,833, and the median income for a family was $78,625. Males had a median income of $50,179 versus $46,250 for females. The per capita income for the township was $82,103. About 2.1% of families and 3.8% of the population were below the poverty line, including 3.3% of those under age 18 and 5.5% of those age 65 or over.
