= Orwell Township, Otter Tail County, Minnesota =

Orwell Township, Minnesota
- Township
- Location of Orwell Township, within Otter Tail County, Minnesota

- Location within the state of Minnesota Orwell Township, Minnesota (the United States)
- Coordinates: 46°13′55″N 96°11′40″W
- Country: United States
- State: Minnesota
- County: Otter Tail

Area
  - Total: 34.9 sq mi (90.4 km^{2})
  - Land: 33.4 sq mi (86.4 km^{2})
  - Water: 1.5 sq mi (4.0 km^{2})
- Elevation: 1,096 ft (334 m)

Population (2020)
  - Total: 144
  - Density: 4.32/sq mi (1.67/km^{2})
- Time zone: UTC-6 (Central (CST))
  - Summer (DST): UTC-5 (CDT)
- FIPS code: 27-48742
- GNIS feature ID: 0665222

Orwell Township is a township in Otter Tail County, Minnesota, United States. The population was 144 at the 2020 census.

== History ==
Orwell Township was organized in 1886, and named after Orwell, Vermont.

== Geography ==
According to the United States Census Bureau, the township has a total area of 34.9 square miles (90.4 km^{2}), of which 33.4 square miles (86.4 km^{2}) is land and 1.5 square miles (4.0 km^{2}) (4.44%) is water.

== Demographics ==
As of the census of 2000, there were 173 people, 62 households, and 49 families residing in the township. The population density was 5.2 people per square mile (2.0/km^{2}). There were 68 housing units at an average density of 2.0/sq mi (0.8/km^{2}). The racial makeup of the township was 98.84% White, 0.58% African American, and 0.58% from two or more races.

There were 62 households, out of which 37.1% had children under the age of 18 living with them, 67.7% were married couples living together, 3.2% had a female householder with no husband present, and 19.4% were non-families. 17.7% of all households were made up of individuals, and 8.1% had someone living alone who was 65 years of age or older. The average household size was 2.79 and the average family size was 3.14.

In the township the population was spread out, with 30.6% under the age of 18, 5.2% from 18 to 24, 26.0% from 25 to 44, 24.9% from 45 to 64, and 13.3% who were 65 years of age or older. The median age was 38 years. For every 100 females, there were 130.7 males. For every 100 females age 18 and over, there were 118.2 males.

The median income for a household in the township was $29,375, and the median income for a family was $28,750. Males had a median income of $26,875 versus $21,250 for females. The per capita income for the township was $13,757. About 10.0% of families and 10.5% of the population were below the poverty line, including 8.3% of those under the age of eighteen and 12.5% of those 65 or over.
