= Homestead Township, Otter Tail County, Minnesota =

Homestead Township, Minnesota
- Township
- Location of Homestead Township, within Otter Tail County, Minnesota

- Location within the state of Minnesota Homestead Township, Minnesota (the United States)
- Coordinates: 46°34′49″N 95°20′35″W
- Country: United States
- State: Minnesota
- County: Otter Tail

Area
  - Total: 36.6 sq mi (94.7 km^{2})
  - Land: 36.4 sq mi (94.3 km^{2})
  - Water: 0.15 sq mi (0.4 km^{2})
- Elevation: 1,447 ft (441 m)

Population (2020)
  - Total: 399
  - Density: 11.0/sq mi (4.23/km^{2})
- Time zone: UTC-6 (Central (CST))
  - Summer (DST): UTC-5 (CDT)
- FIPS code: 27-30050
- GNIS feature ID: 0664515

Homestead Township is a township in Otter Tail County, Minnesota, United States. The population was 399 at the 2020 census.

Homestead Township was organized in 1880, and named for the pioneer homestead farms within its borders.

== Geography ==
According to the United States Census Bureau, the township has a total area of 36.5 square miles (95 km^{2}), of which 36.4 square miles (94 km^{2}) is land and 0.2 square miles (0.52 km^{2}) (0.41%) is water.

== Demographics ==
As of the census of 2000, there were 371 people, 129 households, and 107 families living in the township. The population density was 10.2 inhabitants per square mile (3.9/km^{2}). There were 149 housing units at an average density of 4.1 per square mile (1.6/km^{2}). The racial makeup of the township was 95.69% White, 1.35% African American, 0.54% Native American, 1.08% Asian, and 1.35% from two or more races. Hispanic or Latino of any race were 1.08% of the population.

There were 129 households, out of which 42.6% had children under the age of 18 living with them, 76.0% were married couples living together, 0.8% had a female householder with no husband present, and 16.3% were non-families. 12.4% of all households were made up of individuals, and 5.4% had someone living alone who was 65 years of age or older. The average household size was 2.88 and the average family size was 3.12.

In the township the population was spread out, with 29.9% under the age of 18, 5.9% from 18 to 24, 32.9% from 25 to 44, 21.8% from 45 to 64, and 9.4% who were 65 years of age or older. The median age was 36 years. For every 100 females, there were 108.4 males. For every 100 females age 18 and over, there were 116.7 males.

The median income for a household in the township was $38,036, and the median income for a family was $39,125. Males had a median income of $30,208 versus $20,156 for females. The per capita income for the township was $14,596. About 10.1% of families and 11.8% of the population were below the poverty line, including 15.5% of those under age 18 and 2.7% of those age 65 or over.
