= Otto Township, Otter Tail County, Minnesota =

Otto Township, Minnesota
- Township
- Location of Otto Township, within Otter Tail County, Minnesota

- Location within the state of Minnesota Otto Township, Minnesota (the United States)
- Coordinates: 46°30′13″N 95°29′7″W
- Country: United States
- State: Minnesota
- County: Otter Tail

Area
  - Total: 35.6 sq mi (92.3 km^{2})
  - Land: 31.2 sq mi (80.9 km^{2})
  - Water: 4.4 sq mi (11.4 km^{2})
- Elevation: 1,398 ft (426 m)

Population (2020)
  - Total: 600
  - Density: 19/sq mi (7.4/km^{2})
- Time zone: UTC-6 (Central (CST))
  - Summer (DST): UTC-5 (CDT)
- FIPS code: 27-49264
- GNIS feature ID: 0665242
- Website: https://www.ottotownshipmn.gov/

Otto Township is a township in Otter Tail County, Minnesota, United States. The population was 600 at the 2020 census.

Otto Township was organized in 1883.

== Geography ==
According to the United States Census Bureau, the township has a total area of 35.6 square miles (92.3 km^{2}), of which 31.2 square miles (80.9 km^{2}) is land and 4.4 square miles (11.3 km^{2}) (12.29%) is water.

== Demographics ==
As of the census of 2000, there were 526 people, 197 households, and 150 families living in the township. The population density was 16.8 people per square mile (6.5/km^{2}). There were 353 housing units at an average density of 11.3/sq mi (4.4/km^{2}). The racial makeup of the township was 99.05% White, 0.19% from other races, and 0.76% from two or more races. Hispanic or Latino of any race were 0.57% of the population.

There were 197 households, out of which 32.5% had children under the age of 18 living with them, 66.0% were married couples living together, 3.0% had a female householder with no husband present, and 23.4% were non-families. 21.8% of all households were made up of individuals, and 10.2% had someone living alone who was 65 years of age or older. The average household size was 2.67 and the average family size was 3.13.

In the township the population was spread out, with 26.0% under the age of 18, 6.1% from 18 to 24, 25.3% from 25 to 44, 27.2% from 45 to 64, and 15.4% who were 65 years of age or older. The median age was 39 years. For every 100 females, there were 118.3 males. For every 100 females age 18 and over, there were 121.0 males.

The median income for a household in the township was $40,833, and the median income for a family was $43,750. Males had a median income of $27,885 versus $22,500 for females. The per capita income for the township was $17,337. About 6.0% of families and 8.6% of the population were below the poverty line, including 13.6% of those under age 18 and 8.0% of those age 65 or over.
