= Leaf Mountain Township, Otter Tail County, Minnesota =

Leaf Mountain Township, Minnesota
- Township
- Location of Leaf Mountain Township, within Otter Tail County, Minnesota

- Location within the state of Minnesota Leaf Mountain Township, Minnesota (the United States)
- Coordinates: 46°9′4″N 95°35′34″W
- Country: United States
- State: Minnesota
- County: Otter Tail

Area
  - Total: 35.9 sq mi (93.1 km^{2})
  - Land: 31.9 sq mi (82.5 km^{2})
  - Water: 4.1 sq mi (10.6 km^{2})
- Elevation: 1,424 ft (434 m)

Population (2020)
  - Total: 322
  - Density: 10.1/sq mi (3.90/km^{2})
- Time zone: UTC-6 (Central (CST))
  - Summer (DST): UTC-5 (CDT)
- FIPS code: 27-36008
- GNIS feature ID: 0664738

Leaf Mountain Township is a township in Otter Tail County, Minnesota, United States. The population was 322 at the 2020 census.

Leaf Mountain Township was organized in 1874.

== Geography ==
According to the United States Census Bureau, the township has a total area of 35.9 square miles (93 km^{2}), of which 31.9 square miles (83 km^{2}) is land and 4.1 square miles (11 km^{2}) (11.35%) is water.

== Demographics ==
As of the census of 2000, there were 309 people, 116 households, and 90 families living in the township. The population density was 9.7 inhabitants per square mile (3.7/km^{2}). There were 197 housing units at an average density of 6.2 per square mile (2.4/km^{2}). The racial makeup of the township was 99.68% White, and 0.32% Native American.

There were 116 households, out of which 29.3% had children under the age of 18 living with them, 71.6% were married couples living together, 0.9% had a female householder with no husband present, and 22.4% were non-families. 20.7% of all households were made up of individuals, and 10.3% had someone living alone who was 65 years of age or older. The average household size was 2.66 and the average family size was 3.04.

In the township the population was spread out, with 25.6% under the age of 18, 7.8% from 18 to 24, 22.7% from 25 to 44, 26.9% from 45 to 64, and 17.2% who were 65 years of age or older. The median age was 42 years. For every 100 females, there were 116.1 males. For every 100 females age 18 and over, there were 119.0 males.

The median income for a household in the township was $31,429, and the median income for a family was $39,688. Males had a median income of $31,875 versus $15,000 for females. The per capita income for the township was $20,045. About 10.5% of families and 16.0% of the population were below the poverty line, including 27.4% of those under the age of eighteen and 16.0% of those 65 or over.
