= Aurdal Township, Otter Tail County, Minnesota =

Aurdal Township, Minnesota
- Township
- Location of Aurdal Township, within Otter Tail County, Minnesota

- Location within the state of Minnesota Aurdal Township, Minnesota (the United States)
- Coordinates: 46°19′8″N 95°57′24″W
- Country: United States
- State: Minnesota
- County: Otter Tail

Area
  - Total: 35.2 sq mi (91.1 km^{2})
  - Land: 32.2 sq mi (83.3 km^{2})
  - Water: 3.0 sq mi (7.8 km^{2})
- Elevation: 1,329 ft (405 m)

Population (2020)
  - Total: 1,540
  - Density: 47.9/sq mi (18.5/km^{2})
- Time zone: UTC-6 (Central (CST))
  - Summer (DST): UTC-5 (CDT)
- FIPS code: 27-02836
- GNIS feature ID: 0663480
- Website: https://www.aurdaltownship.org/

Aurdal Township is a township in Otter Tail County, Minnesota, United States. The population was 1,540 at the 2020 census.

Aurdal Township was organized in 1870, and named after Aurdal, in Norway.

== Geography ==
According to the United States Census Bureau, the township has a total area of 35.2 square miles (91 km^{2}), of which 32.2 square miles (83 km^{2}) is land and 3.0 square miles (7.8 km^{2}) (8.58%) is water.

== Demographics ==
At the 2000 census there were 1,362 people, 472 households, and 396 families living in the township. The population density was 42.3 inhabitants per square mile (16.3/km^{2}). There were 494 housing units at an average density of 15.4/sq mi (5.9/km^{2}). The racial makeup of the township was 98.38% White, 0.51% African American, 0.29% Native American, 0.37% Asian, 0.07% Pacific Islander, and 0.37% from two or more races. Hispanic or Latino of any race were 0.59%.

Of the 472 households 40.9% had children under the age of 18 living with them, 78.2% were married couples living together, 3.2% had a female householder with no husband present, and 16.1% were non-families. 13.8% of households were one person and 4.4% were one person aged 65 or older. The average household size was 2.87 and the average family size was 3.17.

The age distribution was 27.9% under the age of 18, 6.8% from 18 to 24, 28.0% from 25 to 44, 27.0% from 45 to 64, and 10.4% 65 or older. The median age was 40 years. For every 100 females, there were 108.3 males. For every 100 females age 18 and over, there were 106.3 males.

The median household income was $50,750 and the median family income was $53,068. Males had a median income of $35,000 versus $22,083 for females. The per capita income for the township was $19,747. About 1.4% of families and 1.8% of the population were below the poverty line, including 0.8% of those under age 18 and 8.3% of those age 65 or over.
