= Deer Creek Township, Otter Tail County, Minnesota =

Deer Creek Township, Minnesota
- Township
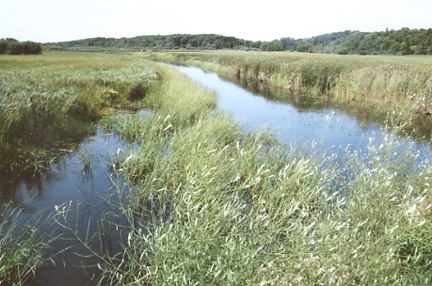
- The Leaf River in Deer Creek Township

- Location of Deer Creek Township, within Otter Tail County, Minnesota

- Location within the state of Minnesota Deer Creek Township, Minnesota (the United States)
- Coordinates: 46°24′19″N 95°21′12″W
- Country: United States
- State: Minnesota
- County: Otter Tail

Area
  - Total: 32.5 sq mi (84.2 km^{2})
  - Land: 32.3 sq mi (83.7 km^{2})
  - Water: 0.19 sq mi (0.5 km^{2})
- Elevation: 1,398 ft (426 m)

Population (2020)
  - Total: 400
  - Density: 12/sq mi (4.8/km^{2})
- Time zone: UTC-6 (Central (CST))
  - Summer (DST): UTC-5 (CDT)
- ZIP code: 56527
- Area code: 218
- FIPS code: 27-15202
- GNIS feature ID: 0663942

Deer Creek Township is a township in Otter Tail County, Minnesota, United States. The population was 400 at the 2020 census.

Deer Creek Township was organized in 1873.

== Geography ==
According to the United States Census Bureau, the township has a total area of 32.5 square miles (84 km^{2}), of which 32.3 square miles (84 km^{2}) is land and 0.2 square miles (0.52 km^{2}) (0.58%) is water.

== Demographics ==
As of the census of 2000, there were 348 people, 113 households, and 96 families residing in the township. The population density was 10.8 inhabitants per square mile (4.2/km^{2}). There were 132 housing units at an average density of 4.1 per square mile (1.6/km^{2}). The racial makeup of the township was 98.28% White, 1.15% from other races, and 0.57% from two or more races. Hispanic or Latino of any race were 1.15% of the population.

There were 113 households, out of which 41.6% had children under the age of 18 living with them, 73.5% were married couples living together, 9.7% had a female householder with no husband present, and 15.0% were non-families. 13.3% of all households were made up of individuals, and 6.2% had someone living alone who was 65 years of age or older. The average household size was 3.08 and the average family size was 3.36.

In the township the population was spread out, with 31.3% under the age of 18, 9.5% from 18 to 24, 23.6% from 25 to 44, 23.6% from 45 to 64, and 12.1% who were 65 years of age or older. The median age was 35 years. For every 100 females, there were 108.4 males. For every 100 females age 18 and over, there were 99.2 males.

The median income for a household in the township was $35,000, and the median income for a family was $37,679. Males had a median income of $25,139 versus $20,972 for females. The per capita income for the township was $11,672. About 6.3% of families and 10.8% of the population were below the poverty line, including 23.9% of those under age 18 and 4.7% of those age 65 or over.
