= Leaf Lake Township, Otter Tail County, Minnesota =

Leaf Lake Township, Minnesota
- Township
- Location of Leaf Lake Township, within Otter Tail County, Minnesota

- Location within the state of Minnesota Leaf Lake Township, Minnesota (the United States)
- Coordinates: 46°24′37″N 95°28′14″W
- Country: United States
- State: Minnesota
- County: Otter Tail

Area
  - Total: 35.6 sq mi (92.3 km^{2})
  - Land: 32.8 sq mi (85.0 km^{2})
  - Water: 2.8 sq mi (7.3 km^{2})
- Elevation: 1,342 ft (409 m)

Population (2020)
  - Total: 637
  - Density: 19.4/sq mi (7.49/km^{2})
- Time zone: UTC-6 (Central (CST))
  - Summer (DST): UTC-5 (CDT)
- FIPS code: 27-35990
- GNIS feature ID: 0664737

Leaf Lake Township is a township in Otter Tail County, Minnesota, United States. The population was 637 at the 2020 census.

== Geography ==
According to the United States Census Bureau, the township has a total area of 35.6 square miles (92 km^{2}), of which 32.8 square miles (85 km^{2}) is land and 2.8 square miles (7.3 km^{2}) (7.89%) is water.

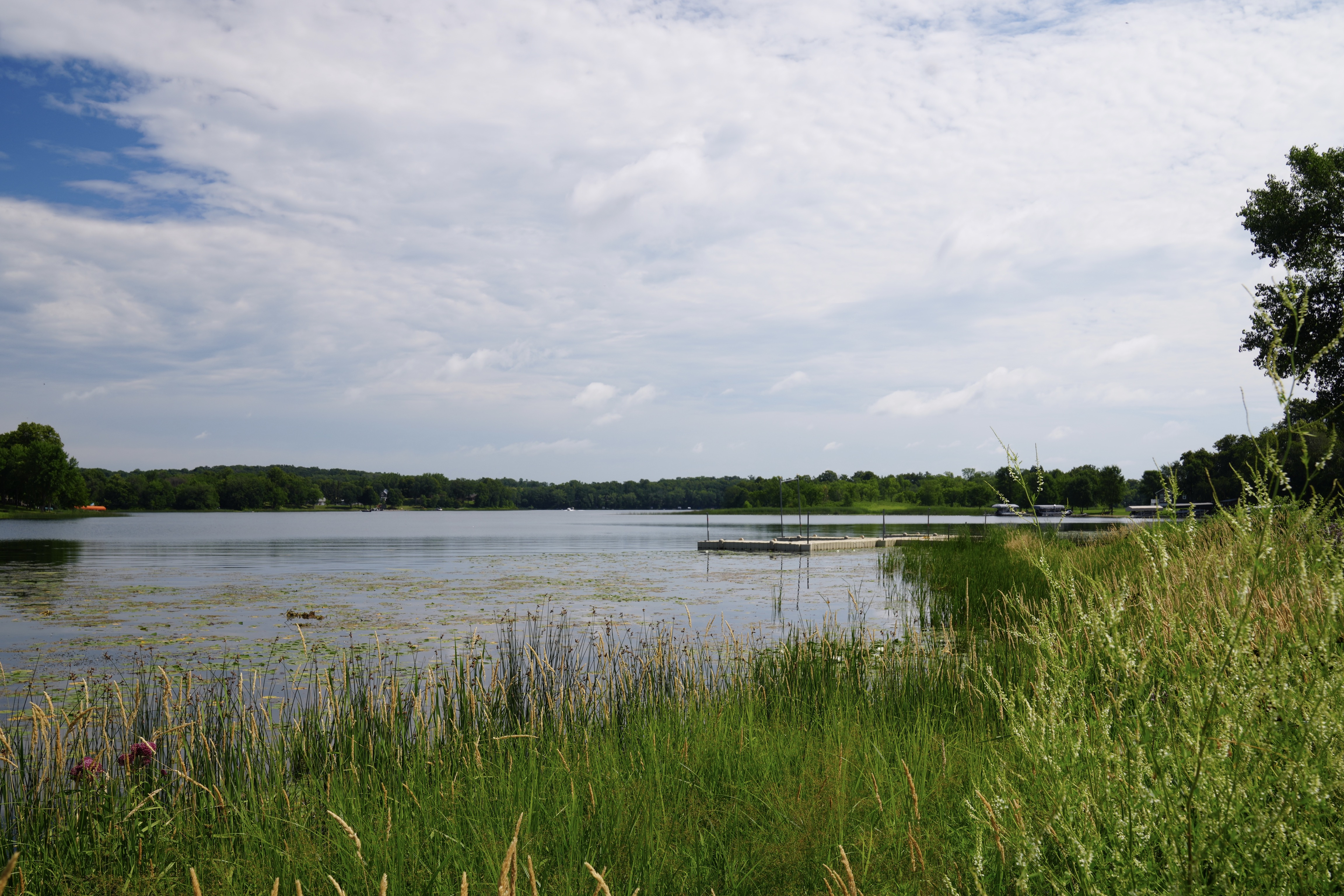
Leaf Lake in Otter Tail County, Minnesota

== History ==
Leaf Lake Township was organized in 1879. This township is named for two lakes, East and West Leaf Lakes, which extend nearly across the township from east to west about the center of the township. Leaf River and Willow Creek flow into East Leaf lake from the north and south ends. Leaf Lake Township was without a railroad until 1902, when the Minneapolis, St. Paul and Sault Ste. Marie Railroad was built through Otter Tail County.

== Demographics ==
As of the census of 2000, there were 467 people, 180 households, and 140 families residing in the township. The population density was 14.2 inhabitants per square mile (5.5/km^{2}). There were 398 housing units at an average density of 12.1 per square mile (4.7/km^{2}). The racial makeup of the township was 99.14% White and 0.86% African American. Hispanic or Latino of any race were 0.21% of the population.

There were 180 households, out of which 30.6% had children under the age of 18 living with them, 67.8% were married couples living together, 6.1% had a female householder with no husband present, and 22.2% were non-families. 21.7% of all households were made up of individuals, and 8.3% had someone living alone who was 65 years of age or older. The average household size was 2.59 and the average family size was 3.02.

In the township the population was spread out, with 25.9% under the age of 18, 5.4% from 18 to 24, 20.6% from 25 to 44, 33.0% from 45 to 64, and 15.2% who were 65 years of age or older. The median age was 44 years. For every 100 females, there were 109.4 males. For every 100 females age 18 and over, there were 109.7 males.

The median income for a household in the township was $32,768, and the median income for a family was $35,179. Males had a median income of $27,500 versus $25,833 for females. The per capita income for the township was $14,634. About 9.7% of families and 16.5% of the population were below the poverty line, including 25.8% of those under age 18 and 12.8% of those age 65 or over.
