= Effington Township, Otter Tail County, Minnesota =

Effington Township, Minnesota
- Township
- Location of Effington Township, within Otter Tail County, Minnesota

- Location within the state of Minnesota Effington Township, Minnesota (the United States)
- Coordinates: 46°9′26″N 95°27′52″W
- Country: United States
- State: Minnesota
- County: Otter Tail

Area
  - Total: 35.0 sq mi (90.7 km^{2})
  - Land: 33.0 sq mi (85.4 km^{2})
  - Water: 2.0 sq mi (5.3 km^{2})
- Elevation: 1,522 ft (464 m)

Population (2020)
  - Total: 237
  - Density: 7.19/sq mi (2.78/km^{2})
- Time zone: UTC-6 (Central (CST))
  - Summer (DST): UTC-5 (CDT)
- FIPS code: 27-18278
- GNIS feature ID: 0664054

Effington Township is a township in Otter Tail County, Minnesota, United States. The population was 237 at the 2020 census.

Effington Township was organized in 1872, and its name was selected from a novel.

== Geography ==
According to the United States Census Bureau, the township has a total area of 35.0 square miles (91 km^{2}), of which 33.0 square miles (85 km^{2}) is land and 2.0 square miles (5.2 km^{2}) (5.83%) is water.

== Demographics ==
As of the census of 2000, there were 297 people, 104 households, and 87 families residing in the township. The population density was 9.0 inhabitants per square mile (3.5/km^{2}). There were 134 housing units at an average density of 4.1 per square mile (1.6/km^{2}). The racial makeup of the township was 100.00% White.

There were 104 households, out of which 40.4% had children under the age of 18 living with them, 75.0% were married couples living together, 5.8% had a female householder with no husband present, and 15.4% were non-families. 14.4% of all households were made up of individuals, and 6.7% had someone living alone who was 65 years of age or older. The average household size was 2.86 and the average family size was 3.16.

In the township the population was spread out, with 28.3% under the age of 18, 5.4% from 18 to 24, 24.2% from 25 to 44, 24.9% from 45 to 64, and 17.2% who were 65 years of age or older. The median age was 40 years. For every 100 females, there were 115.2 males. For every 100 females age 18 and over, there were 117.3 males.

The median income for a household in the township was $30,000, and the median income for a family was $31,250. Males had a median income of $26,250 versus $24,375 for females. The per capita income for the township was $13,734. About 7.9% of families and 6.7% of the population were below the poverty line, including 3.1% of those under the age of eighteen and 19.2% of those 65 or over.
