= Richdale, Minnesota =

Richdale
- Unincorporated community
- Location within Minnesota Location within the United States
- Coordinates: 46°33′17″N 95°28′30″W
- Country: United States
- State: Minnesota
- County: Otter Tail
- Elevation: 1,401 ft (427 m)
- Time zone: UTC-6 (Central (CST))
  - Summer (DST): UTC-5 (CDT)
- Area code: 218
- GNIS feature ID: 654904

Richdale is an unincorporated community in Otter Tail County, in the U.S. state of Minnesota.

== History ==
Richdale was platted in 1899, and named for Watson Wellman Rich, a railroad engineer. A post office was established at Richdale in 1900, and remained in operation until it was discontinued in 1916.
