= Girard Township, Otter Tail County, Minnesota =

Coordinates: 46°19′30″N 95°34′57″W

Girard Township, Minnesota
- Township
- Location of Girard Township, within Otter Tail County, Minnesota

- Location within the state of Minnesota Girard Township, Minnesota (the United States)
- Country: United States
- State: Minnesota
- County: Otter Tail

Area
  - Total: 35.64 sq mi (92.3 km^{2})
  - Land: 26.11 sq mi (67.6 km^{2})
  - Water: 9.53 sq mi (24.7 km^{2})

Population (2020)
  - Total: 715
  - Density: 27.4/sq mi (10.6/km^{2})
- Time zone: UTC-6 (Central (CST))
  - Summer (DST): UTC-5 (CDT)
- Area code: 218

Girard Township is a township in Otter Tail County, Minnesota, United States. The population was 715 at the 2020 census.

Girard Township was organized in 1882.

== Geography ==
According to the United States Census Bureau, the township has a total area of 35.7 square miles (92 km^{2}), of which 25.7 square miles (67 km^{2}) is land and 10.0 square miles (26 km^{2}) (27.95%) is water.

== Demographics ==
At the 2000 United States census there were 697 people, 293 households, and 232 families living in the township. The population density was 27.1 inhabitants per square mile (10.5/km^{2}). There were 876 housing units at an average density of 34.0 per square mile (13.1/km^{2}). The racial makeup of the township was 99.00% White, 0.14% African American, 0.14% Native American, and 0.72% from two or more races. Of the 293 households 21.2% had children under the age of 18 living with them, 75.4% were married couples living together, 2.4% had a female householder with no husband present, and 20.8% were non-families. 20.1% of households were one person and 10.2% were one person aged 65 or older. The average household size was 2.38 and the average family size was 2.70.

The age distribution was 19.4% under the age of 18, 4.4% from 18 to 24, 17.9% from 25 to 44, 34.3% from 45 to 64, and 24.0% 65 or older. The median age was 52 years. For every 100 females, there were 106.2 males. For every 100 females age 18 and over, there were 103.6 males.

The median household income was $41,500 and the median family income was $46,827. Males had a median income of $31,875 versus $26,563 for females. The per capita income for the township was $19,295. About 4.7% of families and 8.8% of the population were below the poverty line, including 12.6% of those under age 18 and 1.4% of those age 65 or over.
