= Parkers Prairie Township, Otter Tail County, Minnesota =

Parkers Prairie Township, Minnesota
- Township
- Location of Parkers Prairie Township, within Otter Tail County, Minnesota

- Location within the state of Minnesota Parkers Prairie Township, Minnesota (the United States)
- Coordinates: 46°8′48″N 95°19′56″W
- Country: United States
- State: Minnesota
- County: Otter Tail

Area
  - Total: 35.1 sq mi (90.9 km^{2})
  - Land: 32.7 sq mi (84.6 km^{2})
  - Water: 2.4 sq mi (6.3 km^{2})
- Elevation: 1,460 ft (445 m)

Population (2020)
  - Total: 390
  - Density: 12/sq mi (4.6/km^{2})
- Time zone: UTC-6 (Central (CST))
  - Summer (DST): UTC-5 (CDT)
- ZIP code: 56361
- Area code: 218
- FIPS code: 27-49750
- GNIS feature ID: 0665258

Parkers Prairie Township is a township in Otter Tail County, Minnesota, United States. The population was 390 at the 2020 census.

Parkers Prairie Township was organized in 1870, and bears the name of a pioneer who settled there upon the prairie.

== Geography ==
According to the United States Census Bureau, the township has a total area of 35.1 square miles (90.9 km^{2}), of which 32.7 square miles (84.6 km^{2}) is land and 2.4 square miles (6.3 km^{2}) (6.95%) is water.

== Demographics ==
As of the census of 2000, there were 345 people, 127 households, and 97 families residing in the township. The population density was 10.6 people per square mile (4.1/km^{2}). There were 144 housing units at an average density of 4.4/sq mi (1.7/km^{2}). The racial makeup of the township was 98.84% White, 0.29% from other races, and 0.87% from two or more races. Hispanic or Latino of any race were 0.87% of the population.

There were 127 households, out of which 37.8% had children under the age of 18 living with them, 63.8% were married couples living together, 7.9% had a female householder with no husband present, and 23.6% were non-families. 20.5% of all households were made up of individuals, and 6.3% had someone living alone who was 65 years of age or older. The average household size was 2.72 and the average family size was 3.10.

In the township the population was spread out, with 28.7% under the age of 18, 7.2% from 18 to 24, 25.5% from 25 to 44, 27.0% from 45 to 64, and 11.6% who were 65 years of age or older. The median age was 40 years. For every 100 females, there were 107.8 males. For every 100 females age 18 and over, there were 103.3 males.

The median income for a household in the township was $37,159, and the median income for a family was $43,125. Males had a median income of $31,786 versus $21,250 for females. The per capita income for the township was $15,018. About 9.1% of families and 9.9% of the population were below the poverty line, including 9.6% of those under age 18 and 16.0% of those age 65 or over.

== Industry ==
Parkers Prairie has a number of different primary and secondary industries, from machine parts manufacture to arable produce processing. A notable industry is the high-tech medical device company, AbbeyMoor Medical whose head office and manufacturing plant is located there. AbbeyMoor Medical manufacture The Spanner Prostatic stent.
