= Minnesota State Highway 78 =

State highway in Minnesota, United States

Trunk Highway 78
- MN 78 highlighted in red

Route information
- Maintained by MnDOT
- Length: 46.694 mi (75.147 km)
- Existed: 1933–present

Major junctions
- South end: MN 79 near Erdahl
- I-94 / US 52 near Ashby; MN 210 at Battle Lake; MN 108 at Ottertail; MN 108 near Perham
- North end: US 10 at Perham

Location
- Country: United States
- State: Minnesota
- Counties: Grant, Douglas, Otter Tail

Highway system
- Minnesota Trunk Highway System; Interstate; US; State; Legislative; Scenic
← MN 77	→ MN 79

Minnesota State Highway 78 (MN 78) is a highway in west-central Minnesota, which runs from MN 79 near Erdahl and continues north to its northern terminus at its interchange with U.S. Highway 10 (US 10) in Perham.

== Route description ==
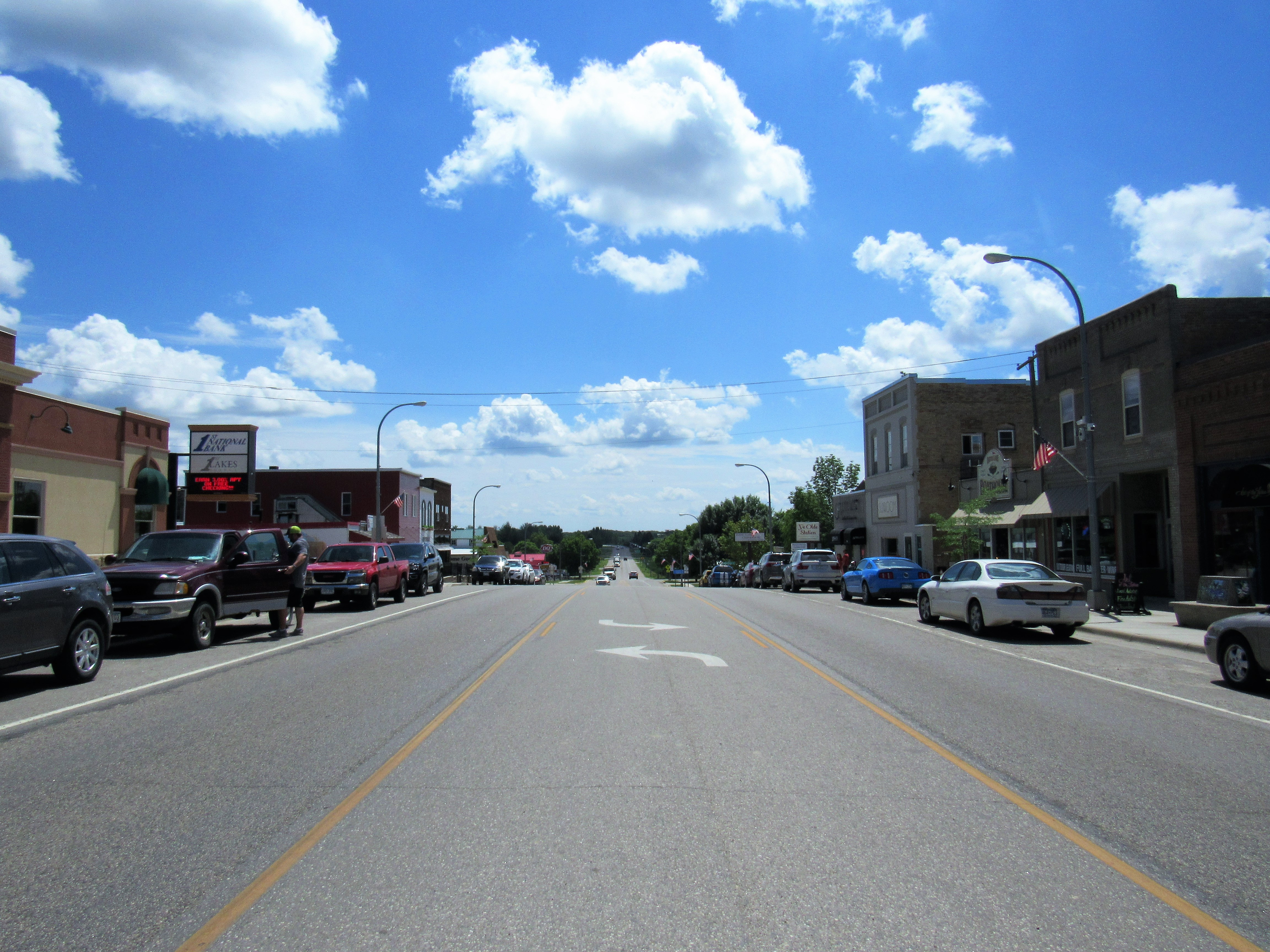
Downtown Battle Lake

MN 78 serves as a north–south highway in west-central Minnesota between Erdahl, Ashby, Battle Lake, Ottertail, and Perham.

MN 78 parallels US 59 and MN 29.

Glendalough State Park is located 1.8 miles (2.9 km) east of the junction of MN 78 and County Road 16 (CR 16) near Battle Lake. The park entrance is located on CR 16.

== History ==
MN 78 was authorized in 1933. The south portion of MN 78 was still gravel in 1953. All of the route was paved by 1960.

MN 78 was extended south from the interchange with Interstate 94/US Highway 52 (I-94/US 52) to Erdahl over part of County State-Aid Highway 10 (CSAH 10) on June 1, 2020. In exchange, MN 54 was turned back to Grant County, and is now CSAH 54.

== Major intersections ==
County	Location	mi	km	Destinations	Notes
Grant	Erdahl Township			MN 79 / I-94 Alt. east – Elbow Lake, Erdahl	
Grant	Pelican Lake Township	0.000– 0.142	0.000– 0.229	I-94 (US 52)	Interchange; I-94 exit 77
Grant	Ashby	4.572	7.358	CSAH 82 / I-94 Alt. west – Evansville, Ashby	Former US 52
Douglas	No major junctions				
Otter Tail	Eagle Lake Township	11.947	19.227	CSAH 38 / Otter Trail Scenic Byway	Southern end of Otter Trail Scenic Byway concurrency
Otter Tail	Eagle Lake Township	14.936	24.037	CSAH 12 / Otter Trail Scenic Byway – Dalton	Northern end of Otter Trail Scenic Byway concurrency
Otter Tail	Battle Lake	21.543	34.670	MN 210 / Otter Trail Scenic Byway – Henning, Fergus Falls	Southern end of Otter Trail Scenic Byway concurrency
Otter Tail	Everts Township	24.109	38.800	CSAH 16 (Pine to Prairie International Birding Trail) – Glendalough State Park	
Otter Tail	Ottertail	36.379	58.546	MN 108 east (Main Street) – Henning	Southern end of MN 108 concurrency
Otter Tail	Perham Township	45.493	73.214	MN 108 west – Dent, Pelican Rapids	Northern end of MN 108 concurrency
Otter Tail	Perham Township	47.114– 47.265	75.823– 76.066	US 10 / CSAH 8 north / Otter Trail Scenic Byway – Wadena, Detroit Lakes	Northern end of Otter Trail Scenic Byway concurrency; interchange
1.000 mi = 1.609 km; 1.000 km = 0.621 mi: Concurrency terminus
