= Minnesota State Highway 79 =

State highway in Minnesota, United States

Trunk Highway 79
- MN 79 highlighted in blue

Route information
- Maintained by MnDOT
- Length: 12.128 mi (19.518 km)
- Existed: 1933–present

Major junctions
- West end: US 59 / MN 55 in Elbow Lake
- MN 78 in Erdahl
- East end: I-94 / US 52 / CR 41 near Evansville

Location
- Country: United States
- State: Minnesota
- Counties: Grant, Douglas

Highway system
- Minnesota Trunk Highway System; Interstate; US; State; Legislative; Scenic
← MN 78	→ MN 80

Minnesota State Highway 79 (MN 79) is a 12.128-mile-long (19.518 km) highway in west-central Minnesota, which runs from its intersection with U.S. 59 / State Highway 55 (co-signed) in the city of Elbow Lake and continues east to its eastern terminus at its interchange with Interstate Highway 94/US Highway 52 and Douglas County State-Aid Highway 41 at Evansville Township near Evansville.

== Route description ==
State Highway 79 serves as an east–west route in west-central Minnesota between Elbow Lake and Interstate 94/US Highway 52.

The city of Evansville is located immediately east of the junction of Interstate 94/US Highway 52, Highway 79, and County State-Aid Highway 41.

== History ==
State Highway 79 was authorized in 1933.

All of the route was paved by 1940.

== Major intersections ==
County	Location	mi	km	Destinations	Notes
Grant	Elbow Lake	0.000	0.000	US 59 / MN 55 – Fergus Falls, Morris	
Grant	Erdahl Township	7.011	11.283	MN 78 north / CSAH 10 south / I-94 Alt. west – Ashby, Barrett	Southern terminus of MN 78
Douglas	Evansville Township	12.014– 12.143	19.335– 19.542	I-94 (US 52) / CSAH 41 – Alexandria, Fergus Falls, Evansville	I-94 Exit 82
1.000 mi = 1.609 km; 1.000 km = 0.621 mi
