= Erdahl, Minnesota =

Unincorporated community in Minnesota, United States

Erdahl
- Unincorporated community
- Location within Minnesota Location within the United States
- Country: United States
- State: Minnesota
- County: Grant
- Elevation: 1,266 ft (386 m)
- Time zone: UTC-6 (Central (CST))
  - Summer (DST): UTC-5 (CDT)
- Area code: 218
- GNIS feature ID: 643390

Erdahl is an unincorporated community in Erdahl Township, Grant County, Minnesota, United States. The community is located between Evansville and Elbow Lake on Minnesota State Highway 79.

== History ==
Erdahl was platted in 1887. A post office was established at Erdahl in 1883, and remained in operation until 1954.
