= West Central Area Schools =

School district in Minnesota, United States

Address
- 301 County Road 2 Barrett, Minnesota; United States
- Coordinates: 45°54′26″N 95°53′51″W

District information
- Type: Public
- Established: 1993

Students and staff
- Enrollment: 777
- District mascot: Knight
- Colors: Red, Black, Silver

Other information
- Website: www.isd2342.org

The West Central Area School District (#2342) is located in the west central part of Minnesota. It consists of the towns of Kensington, Hoffman, Barrett, Elbow Lake, and Wendell. There are also students from Herman, Donnelly, Ashby, Evansville, Fergus Falls, Nashua, and Campbell.

The district has two elementary schools consisting of grades K-4. WCA South is located in Kensington, and WCA North, formerly known as Agnes Lynne Elementary School, is located in Elbow Lake. The secondary school is located in Barrett. Grades 5-12 attend here. The secondary school has a football field, two baseball fields, two softball fields, four tennis courts, a 499 capacity auditorium, commercial greenhouse, and a 1700 capacity gymnasium. The building occupies 63 acres (250,000 m^{2}). It is 130,000 square feet (12,000 m^{2}) with a capacity for 600 students. The building is heated by a geothermal heat system. There are 288 wells, each 200 ft (61 m) deep using over 21 miles (34 km) of pipe. A heat pump, controlled by a computer system, heats or cools each classroom. The system has a backup generator. The mechanical room includes a 400 gallon hot water storage tank.

The West Central Area mascot is a Knight. The Knights have a football team, volleyball team, girls tennis team, boys and girls basketball, wrestling, baseball, softball, boys and girls golf, boys and girls track and field, boys and girls cross country, and cheerleading for football and basketball. The Knight's organizations include: speech, Future Farmers of America, mock trial, choir, band, Knowledge Bowl, one act play, student council, and musicals. West Central Area is a member of the Minnesota State High School League.

== History ==
The West Central Area school district was created in 1993 when the West Central school district of Elbow Lake, Wendell, and Barrett joined with the Hoffman-Kensington school district due to declining enrollment. However, consolidation had started long before that. Wendell, Elbow Lake, Barrett, Hoffman and Kensington all used to be their own districts, but kept consolidating with each other until they all finally became one, large district. Declining enrollment continues to be the district's largest problem today. Class sizes in the high school are down to around 20 people per class.

== Other accomplishments ==
The Knights have fielded a national championship qualifying team in the televised Academic Challenge (national). West Central (Elbow Lake-Wendell-Barrett) was one of the eight inaugural Knowledge Bowl teams in the state of Minnesota back in 1979. Now almost every district in the state has a Knowledge Bowl team.

== See also ==
- List of school districts in Minnesota
