= Minnesota State Highway 108 =

State highway in Minnesota, United States

Trunk Highway 108
- MN 108 highlighted in red

Route information
- Maintained by MnDOT
- Length: 61.451 mi (98.896 km)
- Existed: April 22, 1933–present

Major junctions
- West end: I-94 / US 52 at near Lawndale
- US 59 at Pelican Rapids; MN 78 near Perham; MN 78 at Ottertail
- East end: MN 210 at Henning

Location
- Country: United States
- State: Minnesota
- Counties: Wilkin, Otter Tail

Highway system
- Minnesota Trunk Highway System; Interstate; US; State; Legislative; Scenic
← MN 107	→ MN 109

Minnesota State Highway 108 (MN 108) is a 61.451-mile-long (98.896 km) highway in west-central Minnesota, which runs from its interchange with Interstate Highway 94/US Highway 52 at Prairie View Township near Rothsay and continues east to its eastern terminus at its intersection with State Highway 210 in Henning.

Highway 108 passes through the cities of Pelican Rapids and Henning.

== Route description ==
Highway 108 serves as an east–west and a north–south route between Interstate 94/US Highway 52, Pelican Rapids, Dent, Perham, Ottertail, and Henning in west-central Minnesota.

The roadway changes direction to north–south as it runs concurrent with State Highway 78 for 9 miles between Perham Township and Ottertail.

Highway 108 is also known as:

- NW 1st Avenue in Pelican Rapids.
- Main Street in Ottertail.
- Douglas Avenue in Henning.

Maplewood State Park is located 7 miles east of Pelican Rapids on Highway 108 near Lake Lida.

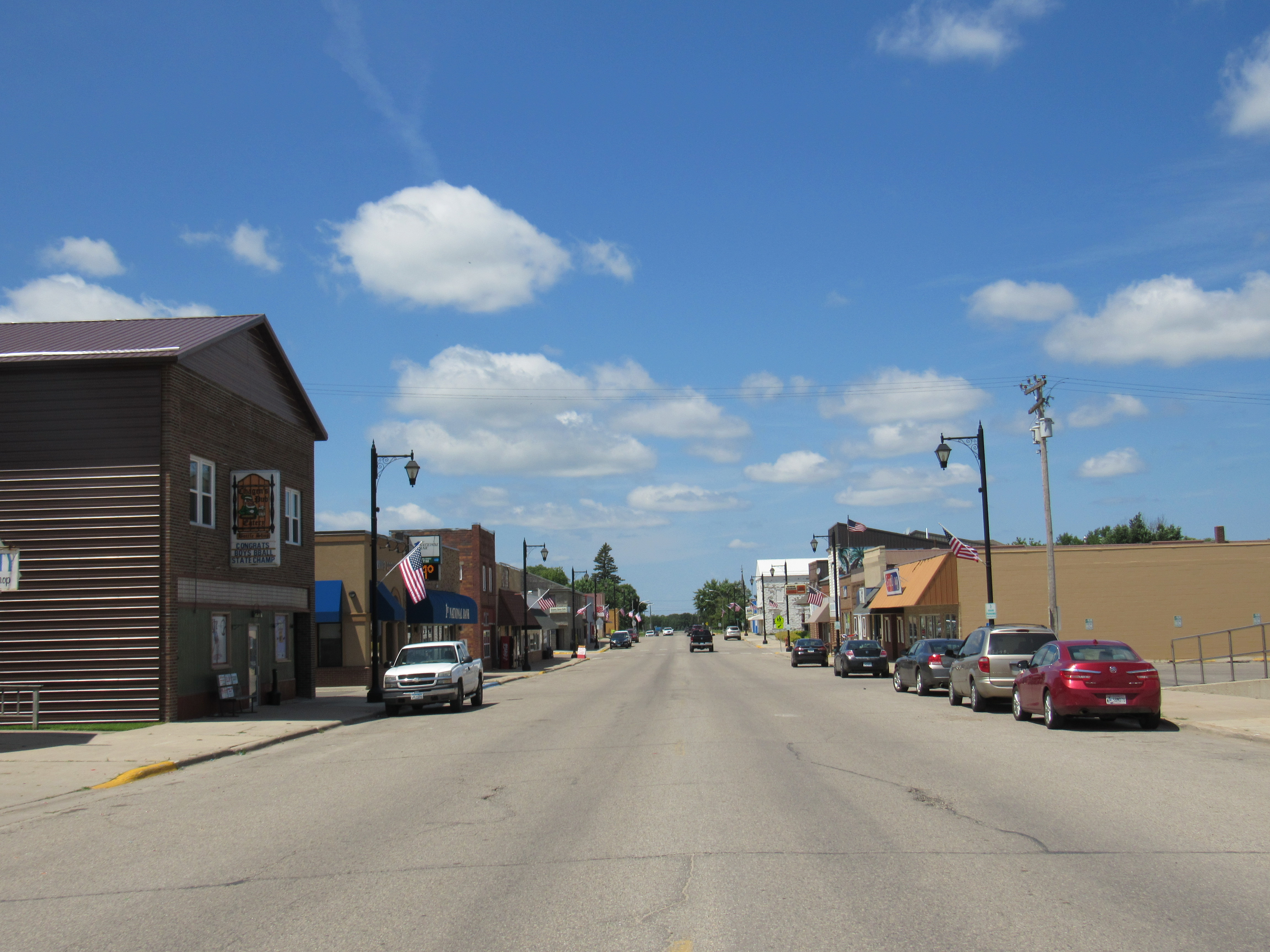
Highway 108 in Henning

== History ==
Highway 108 was authorized in 1933 between U.S. 59 at Pelican Rapids and State Highway 78 near Perham. The section of Highway 108 between State Highway 78 at Ottertail and State Highway 210 at Henning was also authorized in 1933. Both of these sections were paved by 1953.

The section of Highway 108 between U.S. 59 at Pelican Rapids and present day Interstate 94 (near Rothsay and Lawndale) was authorized in 1949. This section of Highway 108 was paved by 1960.

== Major intersections ==
County	Location	mi	km	Destinations	Notes
Wilkin	Prairie View Township	0.080– 0.263	0.129– 0.423	I-94 (US 52) / CSAH 30 – Fergus Falls, Moorhead	I-94 Exit 32
Otter Tail	Pelican Rapids	12.047	19.388	US 59 north	North end of US 59 overlap
Otter Tail	Pelican Rapids	12.186	19.611	US 59 south / Otter Trail Scenic Byway	North end of US 59 overlap
Otter Tail	Dent	31.575	50.815	CSAH 35 / Otter Trail Scenic Byway	
Otter Tail	Perham Township	38.408	61.812	MN 78 north – Perham	North end of MN 78 overlap
Otter Tail	Ottertail	47.526	76.486	MN 78 south – Battle Lake	South end of MN 78 overlap
Otter Tail	Henning	61.445	98.886	MN 210 – Fergus Falls, Staples	
1.000 mi = 1.609 km; 1.000 km = 0.621 mi: Concurrency terminus
