= Grant County Courthouse =

Grant County Courthouse may refer to:

- Grant County Courthouse (Arkansas)
- Grant County Courthouse (Kansas)
- Grant County Courthouse (Minnesota)
- Grant County Courthouse (Oklahoma)
- Grant County Courthouse (South Dakota)
- Grant County Courthouse (Washington)
- Grant County Courthouse (Wisconsin)
- Grant County Courthouse (West Virginia)
