= Roosevelt Hall (Minnesota) =

- U.S. National Register of Historic Places
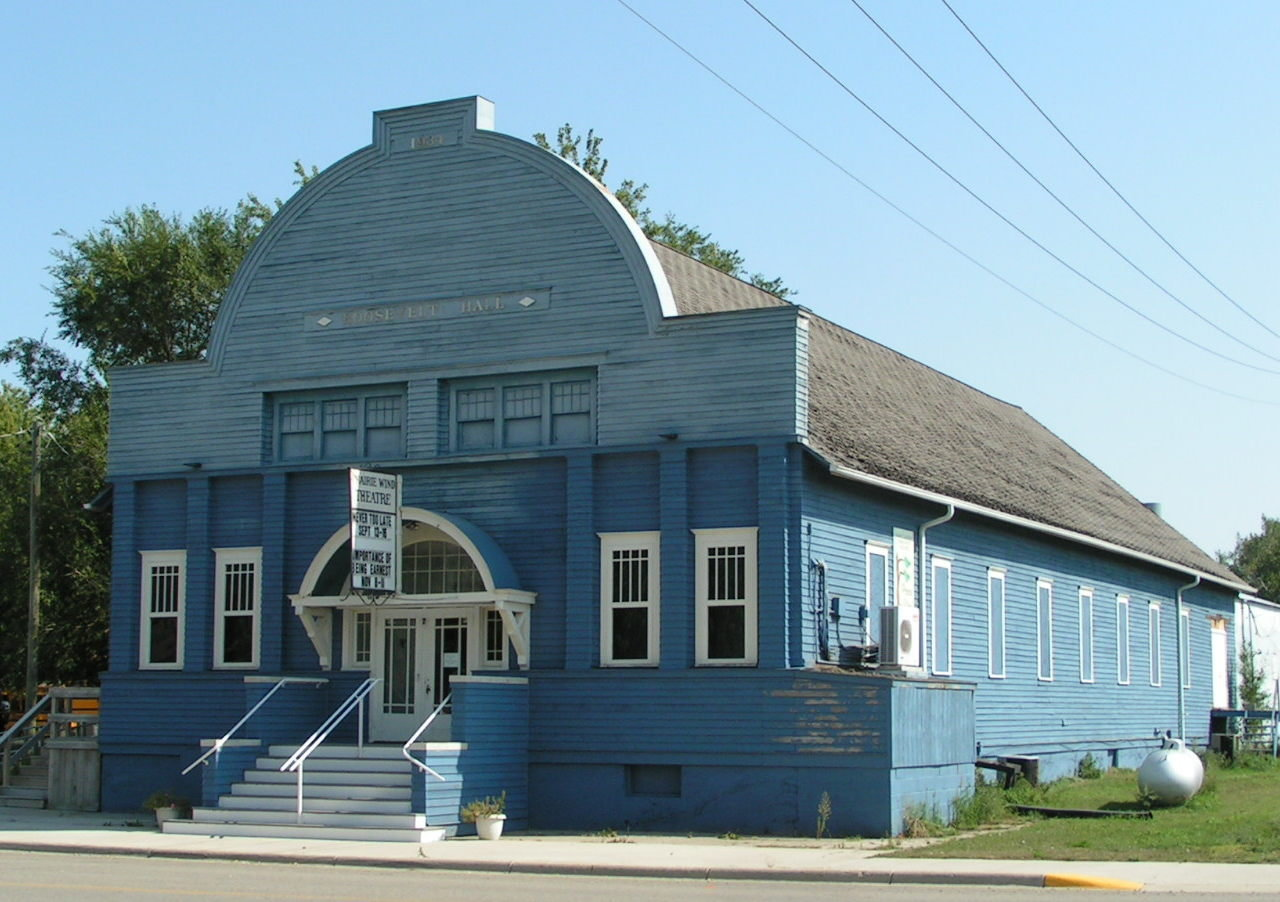

- Location within Minnesota Location within the United States
- Location: Barrett, Minnesota
- Coordinates: 45°54′39″N 95°53′17″W
- Built: 1933
- Architect: Civil Works Administration
- NRHP reference No.: 85001819
- Added to NRHP: August 23, 1985

Roosevelt Hall is a community auditorium and gymnasium building in Barrett, Minnesota, in Grant County. The building was built by the Civil Works Administration, a predecessor of the Works Progress Administration, in 1934. It was listed on the National Register of Historic Places in 1985 for being one of the few buildings built by the CWA in Minnesota. The CWA made it possible for small communities such as Barrett to build architecturally sophisticated buildings at a low cost. The building has also served as a social, cultural, and educational center for the community.

The building is built of wood-frame construction and measures 42 feet (13 m) wide by 110 feet (34 m) long. It is faced with western red cedar clapboard siding, and topped with a gabled roof with wood shingles. The interior originally had a wooden gymnasium floor, a 19 feet (5.8 m) by 30 feet (9.1 m) stage, and a 41 feet (12 m) by 44 feet (13 m) balcony.

The gymnasium was once used by the local public school, but after they built their own gymnasium in the early 1950s, the hall's use began to decline. The original stage was removed in 1957, and the building housed a bowling alley for 14 years. It then housed a youth center in 1973–1974, and it was used as an insulation manufacturing plant from 1977 through 1979. The building is now used by the Prairie Wind Players, a community theater group. The theater group built a proscenium stage in the early 1980s. In 2004, the lobby was gutted and remodeled, with new restrooms and new ticket booths.
