= Prospect House (Battle Lake, Minnesota) =

Historic house in Minnesota, United States

- Prospect House & Civil War Museum
- U.S. National Register of Historic Places
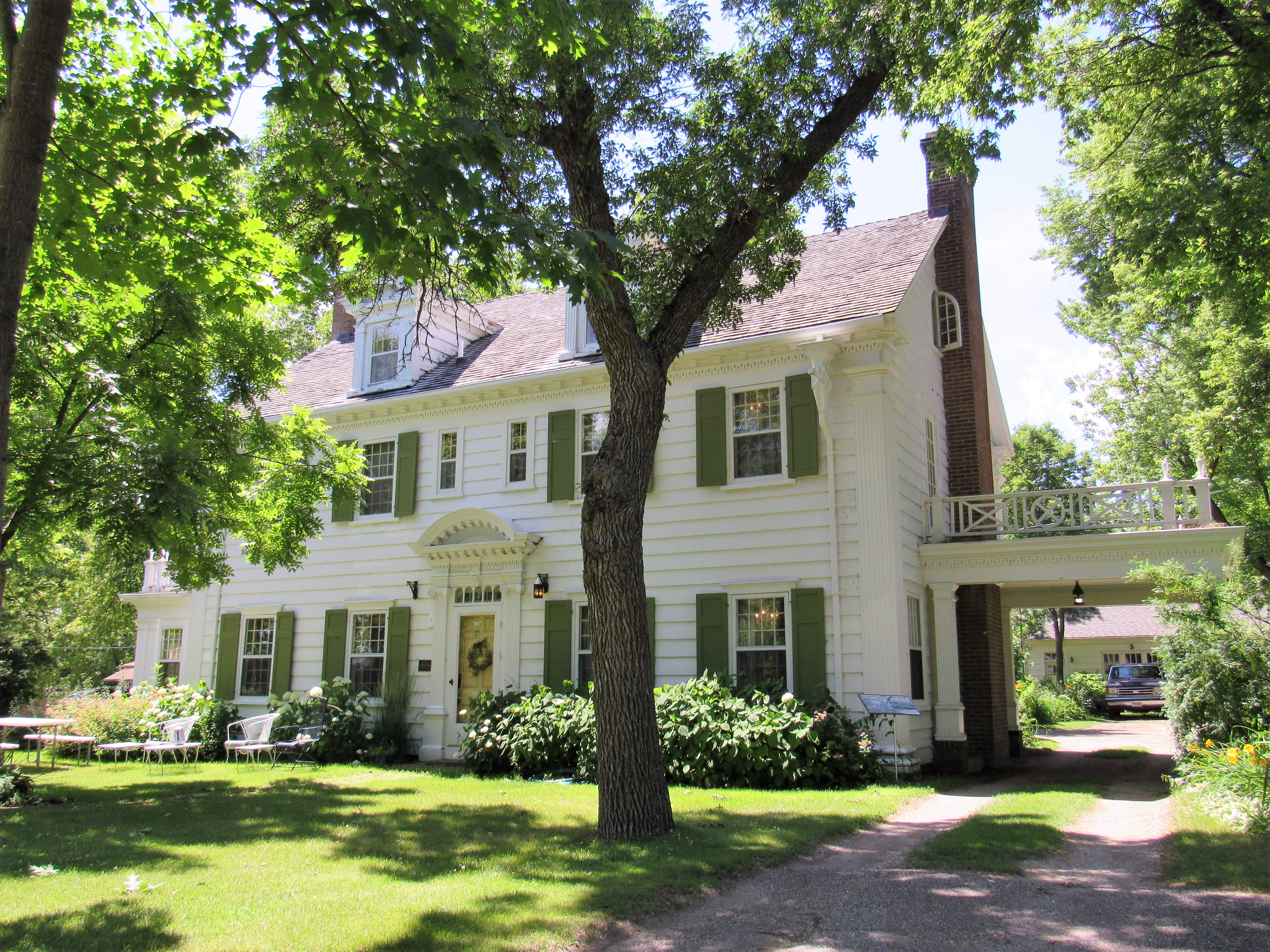

- Location within Minnesota Location within the United States
- Location: 403 Lake Avenue N. Battle Lake, Minnesota
- Coordinates: 46°17′08″N 95°42′53″W
- Area: less than one acre
- Built: 1929
- Built by: John Lauritzen Co.
- Architect: Einar Broaten; Magnus Foss
- Architectural style: Colonial Revival
- NRHP reference No.: 13000326
- Added to NRHP: May 28, 2013

Prospect House, also known as the Prospect Inn and the Prospect House & Civil War Museum, is a historic building in Battle Lake, Minnesota, United States. James A. "Cap" Colehour bought the property in 1882 and had a house built there according to the plans of his home in Chicago, Illinois. Prospect House was built five years later as an addition. The 2½-story frame Georgian Revival structure was a 26-room summer resort that overlooked the lake. The Colehours operated the inn for 38 years. They sold it to their daughter and son-in-law who converted into their home in 1929. They moved the 1882 house across the street and rented it out until 1968. Cap Colehour had enlisted in the 92nd Illinois Volunteer Infantry Regiment during the American Civil War. His extensive collection of war memorabilia is now on display in the house. It was listed on the National Register of Historic Places in 2013.

Visit Prospect House website
