= Glendalough State Park =

State park in Minnesota, United States

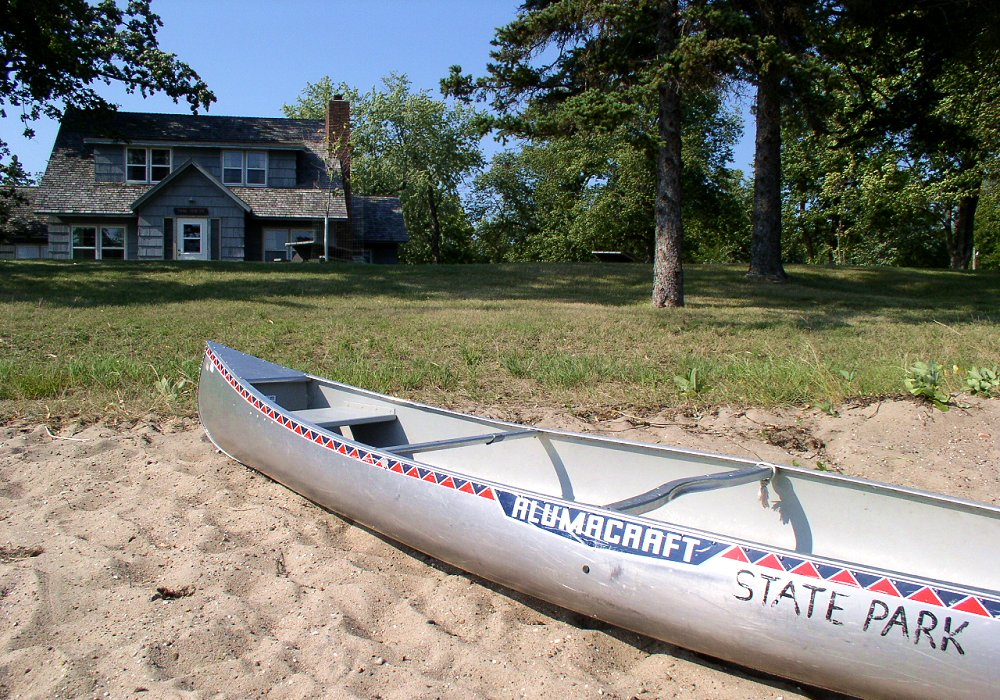
- The former resort of Cowles Media Company is now a public park.

- Location within Minnesota Location within the United States
- Location: Otter Tail, Minnesota, United States
- Coordinates: 46°20′0″N 95°40′0″W
- Area: 1,931 acres (7.81 km^{2})
- Elevation: 1,329 ft (405 m)
- Established: 1992
- Named for: Glendalough
- Governing body: Minnesota Department of Natural Resources

Glendalough State Park

Glendalough State Park is a state park of Minnesota, USA, in Otter Tail County near Battle Lake close to Minnesota State Highway 78. It is named after Glendalough in Ireland. The park was once used as a resort and game farm by the owners of Cowles Media Company, owner of what is today the Star Tribune newspaper. The park contains 1,931 acres (7.81 km^{2}) on land and 1,000 acres (4.0 km^{2}) on the water. Cowles Media Company transferred title to Glendalough to the Nature Conservancy in 1990, and the Nature Conservancy transferred title to the State of Minnesota in 1992. Glendalough was officially declared a state park with a celebration on Earth Day, April 22, 1992.

== History ==
In 1903, Ezra G. Valentine developed that land into a summer retreat called Valentine's Camp. In 1905 the park was left to Valentine's children, John Alden and Miss Blanche, who later sold the land to Fred A. Everts. Everts sold the Valentine camp to F.E. Murphy who owned and operated the Minneapolis Tribune. Murphy renamed the land Glendalough, after a monastery in Ireland. With the depression in the 1930s and land becoming available for purchase, Murphy expanded the camp and started a game farm. In 1941, Glendalough, along with the Minneapolis Tribune, was purchased by Cowles Media Company, which was partially owned by John Cowles, Sr. Glendalough Game Farm hosted important individuals such as President Dwight D. Eisenhower, President Richard Nixon and Vice President Walter Mondale during its time. On Earth Day in 1990, the land was donated to The Nature Conservancy by Cowles Media Company, and in 1992 the title was transferred to the State of Minnesota. While that transfer took place in June, celebrations of the park's anniversary are held around Earth Day.

=== 2004 and 2005 blowdown ===
In August 2004, a severe thunderstorm with straight-line winds came through the area, causing severe damage to the landscape. As a result of this devastating incident, the park was closed to the public for a week to clean up debris left by the storm. Less than ten months later, in 2005, Glendalough State Park was hit by another thunderstorm resulting in damage. Following the 2005 storm, the state park was able to remain open with aid from the staff and volunteers of the park. The staff and volunteers used signs and notices warning park visitors of hazards of downed trees throughout the park.

== Recreation ==
Glendalough State Park has many forms of recreation facilities that are provided to park visitors, including fishing, camping, hiking, birding, picture taking, boating, kayaking and canoeing. The park has a Historic Lodge where former Presidents Dwight D. Eisenhower and Richard Nixon, and former Vice President Walter Mondale stayed when they visited Glendalough State Park. While camping at Glendalough State Park, it is highly advised that any food be stored into a food locker that the park provides with the site. The park discourage visitors from storing their food in the tents because the wildlife can easily tear open the tents and get to the food.

=== Lodging ===
Glendalough State Park has the historic Glendalough Lodge at the park. The lodge is rented out to parties for tours or family gatherings. The state park also has the Trail Center near the Glendalough Lodge.

=== Camping ===
At Glendalough State Park, there are three sites designated for camping. The west shore of Annie Battle Lake, between south Annie Battle Lake and North of Molly Stark Lake and on the Southeast corner of Annie Battle Lake.

=== Picnicking and swimming ===
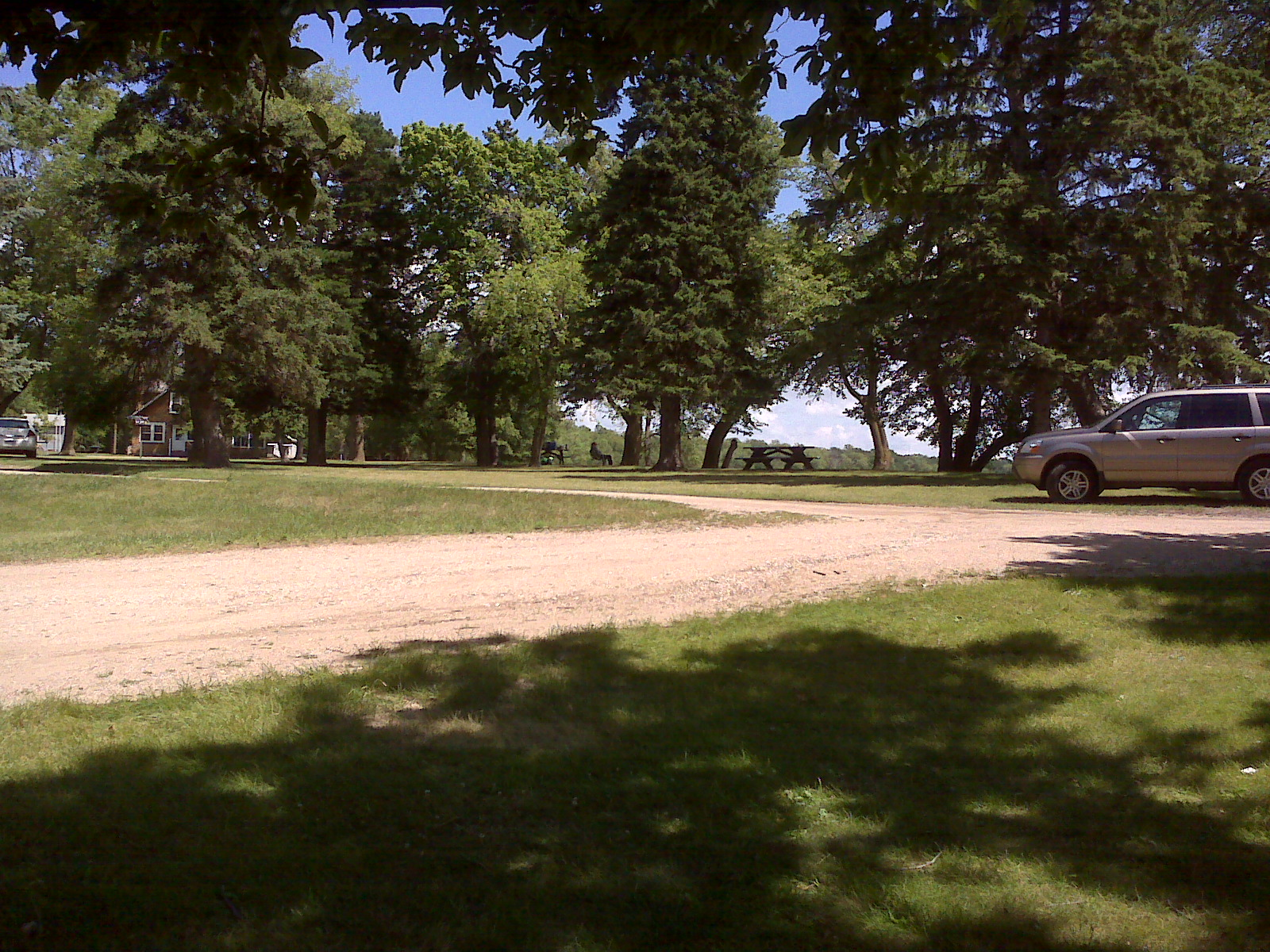
This is a scene of one of Glendalough State Park's picnic and beach areas.

Glendalough offers picnicking and swimming areas, often with solitude. Glendalough has two swimming areas for the visitors: on the north shore of Annie Battle Lake near the historic Lodge and Trail Center, and on the north shore of Molly Stark Lake near the Picnic Shelter.

==== Cart-in site ====
The campsite along the west side of Annie Battle Lake is designated as a cart-in campground. The state park wants the park visitors to have a primitive setting while camping. This location has four cabins; four electric cabins with one of the cabins being designated as handicapped accessible for the park visitors who need these accommodations.

==== Group camp ====
There is one group camp site in the state park: along the creek that flows from Molly Stark Lake to Annie Battle Lake. The group camp is designated for more than seven people for a regular site but no more than 45.

==== Canoe-in campground ====
The canoe-in campsites is one of the primitive settings that Glendalough State Park has to offer. Over at the canoe-in sites are three tent sites and two yurts. Glendalough State Park is one of three state parks in Minnesota to have yurts available for campers to stay in.

==== Rustic camping ====
Between Labor Day and Memorial Day, the facility at the main campground shuts down for the season for a more rustic style of living.

==== Trail Center ====
In 2017, a plan for a Visitor and Trail Center was made. Due to the COVID-19 pandemic, budgetary restrictions, and several contractor mistakes, the plan’s scale was reduced to just a Trail Center. Opening in July 2025, the Trail Center has several bathrooms, a common space, and a rental area for vendors.

== Biology and ecology ==
=== Plant life ===
Glendalough State Park has a few restored acres of land designated as prairie restoration. Within this restoration land, prairie plants such as Big Bluestem, Pasque Flower, and Pussy toe may be found.

=== Wildlife ===
Wildlife at Glendalough State Park consists of red-winged blackbirds, white-tailed deer, bald eagles, ospreys, turtles, Canada geese, wood ducks, pied-billed grebes, barred owls, red foxes, blue-winged teals, beavers, raccoons and snakes.
