= Barrett, Minnesota =

City in Minnesota, United States

Barrett
- City
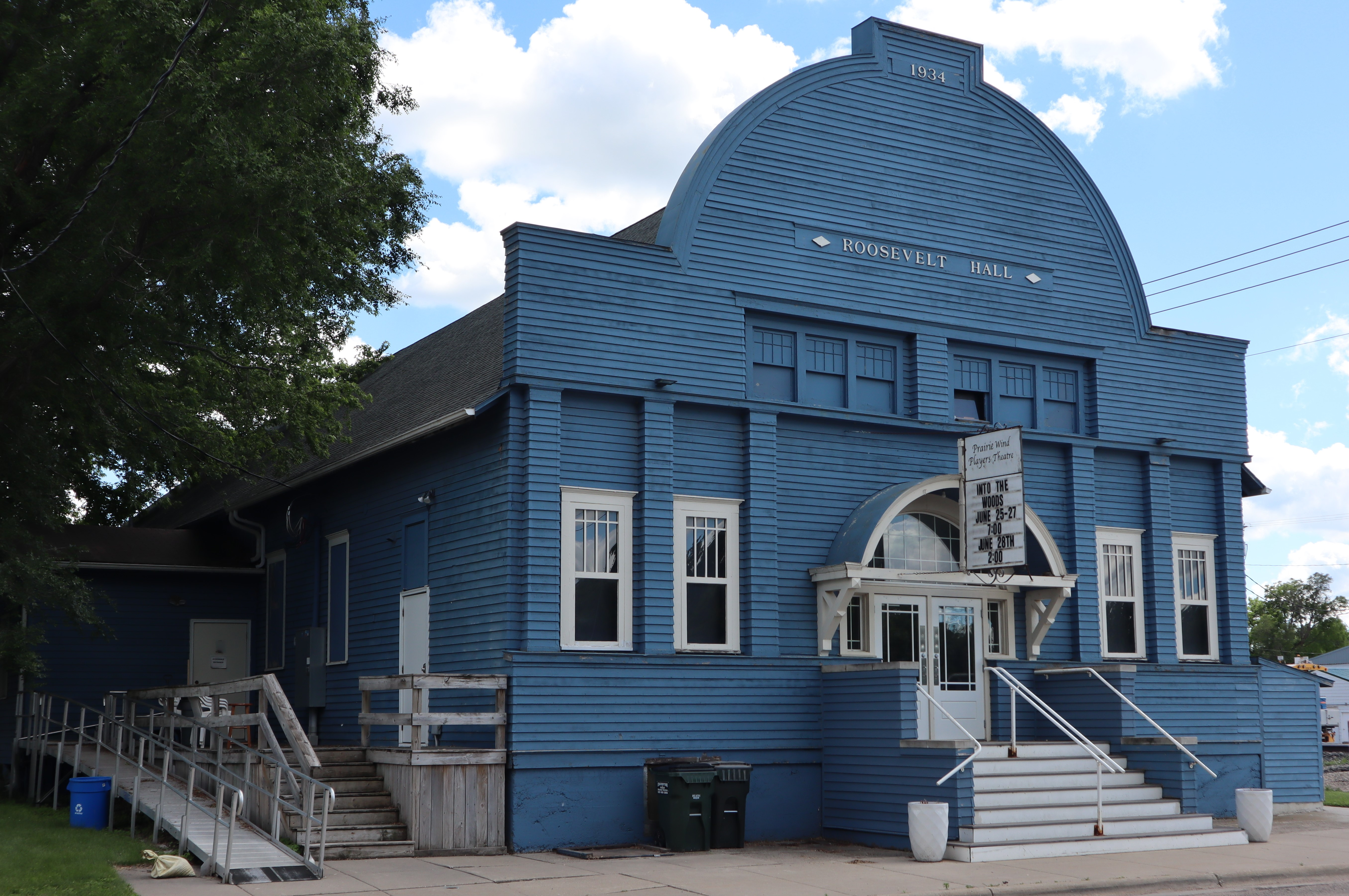
- Roosevelt Hall in Barrett
- Motto: "The Little Town With Big Dreams"
- Location of Barrett, Minnesota
- Coordinates: 45°54′39″N 95°53′18″W
- Country: United States
- State: Minnesota
- County: Grant

Area
  - Total: 2.11 sq mi (5.46 km^{2})
  - Land: 2.08 sq mi (5.40 km^{2})
  - Water: 0.023 sq mi (0.06 km^{2})
- Elevation: 1,158 ft (353 m)

Population (2020)
  - Total: 366
  - Density: 175.4/sq mi (67.72/km^{2})
- Time zone: UTC-6 (Central (CST))
  - Summer (DST): UTC-5 (CDT)
- ZIP code: 56311
- Area code: 320
- FIPS code: 27-03682
- GNIS feature ID: 2394069
- Website: https://www.barrettmn.com/

Barrett is a city in Grant County, Minnesota, United States. The population was 366 at the 2020 census.

== History ==
Barrett was platted in 1887. The community was named for General Theodore H. Barrett. A post office has been in operation at Barrett since 1887. Barrett was incorporated as a city in 1889. In 1900, a fire burned 23 buildings and caused a loss of almost $60,000. Three buildings in Barrett are listed on the National Register of Historic Places, including Roosevelt Hall, which is used for community theatre and other events.

== Geography ==
According to the United States Census Bureau, the city has a total area of 2.11 square miles (5.46 km^{2}), of which 2.09 square miles (5.41 km^{2}) is land and 0.02 square miles (0.05 km^{2}) is water.

The town of Barrett wraps around the southwest side of Barrett Lake, which is formed by the Pomme de Terre River.

== Demographics ==
Historical population
| Census | Pop. | Note | %± |
|---|---|---|---|
| 1900 | 237 | | — |
| 1910 | 278 | | 17.3% |
| 1920 | 358 | | 28.8% |
| 1930 | 368 | | 2.8% |
| 1940 | 384 | | 4.3% |
| 1950 | 402 | | 4.7% |
| 1960 | 345 | | −14.2% |
| 1970 | 342 | | −0.9% |
| 1980 | 388 | | 13.5% |
| 1990 | 350 | | −9.8% |
| 2000 | 355 | | 1.4% |
| 2010 | 415 | | 16.9% |
| 2020 | 366 | | −11.8% |
U.S. Decennial Census

=== 2010 census ===
As of the census of 2010, there were 415 people, 161 households, and 89 families residing in the city. The population density was 198.6 inhabitants per square mile (76.7/km^{2}). There were 195 housing units at an average density of 93.3 per square mile (36.0/km^{2}). The racial makeup of the city was 100.0% White. Hispanic or Latino of any race were 0.5% of the population.

There were 161 households, of which 29.8% had children under the age of 18 living with them, 40.4% were married couples living together, 8.1% had a female householder with no husband present, 6.8% had a male householder with no wife present, and 44.7% were non-families. 39.8% of all households were made up of individuals, and 23% had someone living alone who was 65 years of age or older. The average household size was 2.32 and the average family size was 3.01.

The median age in the city was 40.5 years. 24.3% of residents were under the age of 18; 6.1% were between the ages of 18 and 24; 21.9% were from 25 to 44; 18.6% were from 45 to 64; and 29.2% were 65 years of age or older. The gender makeup of the city was 49.6% male and 50.4% female.

=== 2000 census ===
As of the census of 2000, there were 355 people, 142 households, and 81 families residing in the city. The population density was 172.2 inhabitants per square mile (66.5/km^{2}). There were 163 housing units at an average density of 79.1 per square mile (30.5/km^{2}). The racial makeup of the city was 98.87% White, 0.56% Native American, and 0.56% from two or more races.

There were 142 households, out of which 20.4% had children under the age of 18 living with them, 43.0% were married couples living together, 9.9% had a female householder with no husband present, and 42.3% were non-families. 38.0% of all households were made up of individuals, and 21.1% had someone living alone who was 65 years of age or older. The average household size was 2.05 and the average family size was 2.63.

In the city, the population was spread out, with 15.5% under the age of 18, 7.0% from 18 to 24, 19.4% from 25 to 44, 19.7% from 45 to 64, and 38.3% who were 65 years of age or older. The median age was 54 years. For every 100 females, there were 82.1 males. For every 100 females age 18 and over, there were 71.4 males.

The median income for a household in the city was $28,750, and the median income for a family was $37,813. Males had a median income of $27,500 versus $16,250 for females. The per capita income for the city was $13,954. About 6.8% of families and 8.8% of the population were below the poverty line, including 5.9% of those under age 18 and 12.9% of those age 65 or over.

== Arts and culture ==
=== Annual cultural events ===
The “Annual Old Settlers Reunion” is held every year the weekend nearest to June 24. The event includes dinners, dances, parades, classic cars, ball games, and contests of all kinds, including a firefighters challenge.

== Parks and recreation ==
The Lakeside Pavilion is one of the few surviving lakeside facilities of its kind in Minnesota. The community of Barrett has worked to restore and renovate the Pavilion. It remains a popular place for dances and community events. The Pavilion available for rental May 1 through September 30.

The Barrett Lake Resort and Campground features a sandy beach and swimming area, game fishing, cabins and campsites and a general store.

== Government ==
Michelle Jenson is the current mayor.

== Education ==
Barrett is part of the West Central Area Schools, which also includes the communities of Elbow Lake, Hoffman, Kensington, and Wendell. The West Central Area secondary school (grades 5-12) is located in Barrett, while elementary facilities are located in Elbow Lake and Kensington. Barrett was chosen as the location for the secondary facility as it is centrally located in the school district. The facility opened in the fall of 1995.

== Infrastructure ==
=== Major highways ===
- U.S. Route 59
- Minnesota State Highway 27 (Approximately five miles south of city limits)
- Minnesota State Highway 55

== The "Elbow Lake" Runestone ==
In August 1949, the nearest local newspaper to Barrett, the Elbow Lake Herald, reported that, five years earlier, farmer Victor Setterlund had found on his land, near Barrett Lake, a heart-shaped stone weighing about 75 pounds (34 kg), bearing a runic inscription. Translated, the runic message was "[Year ????]. Four maidens camped on this hill." Hjalmar Holand, principal promoter of the Kensington Runestone (not far to the south-east of Barrett in 1898) interpreted the year symbols as 1362, the same as the Kensington stone. Professor Johan Andreas Holvik thought they should be read as 1776. Both agreed that the stone seemed to be a hoax. When Holvik revisited the area and asked Setterlund what the year symbols were meant to represent, the farmer confessed that he had carved the stone himself, using a list of runes in a textbook, and intended the date 1876, adding "It sure doesn't take much to put some people on if they want to believe you bad enough."
