= Grant County Courthouse (Minnesota) =

- U.S. National Register of Historic Places
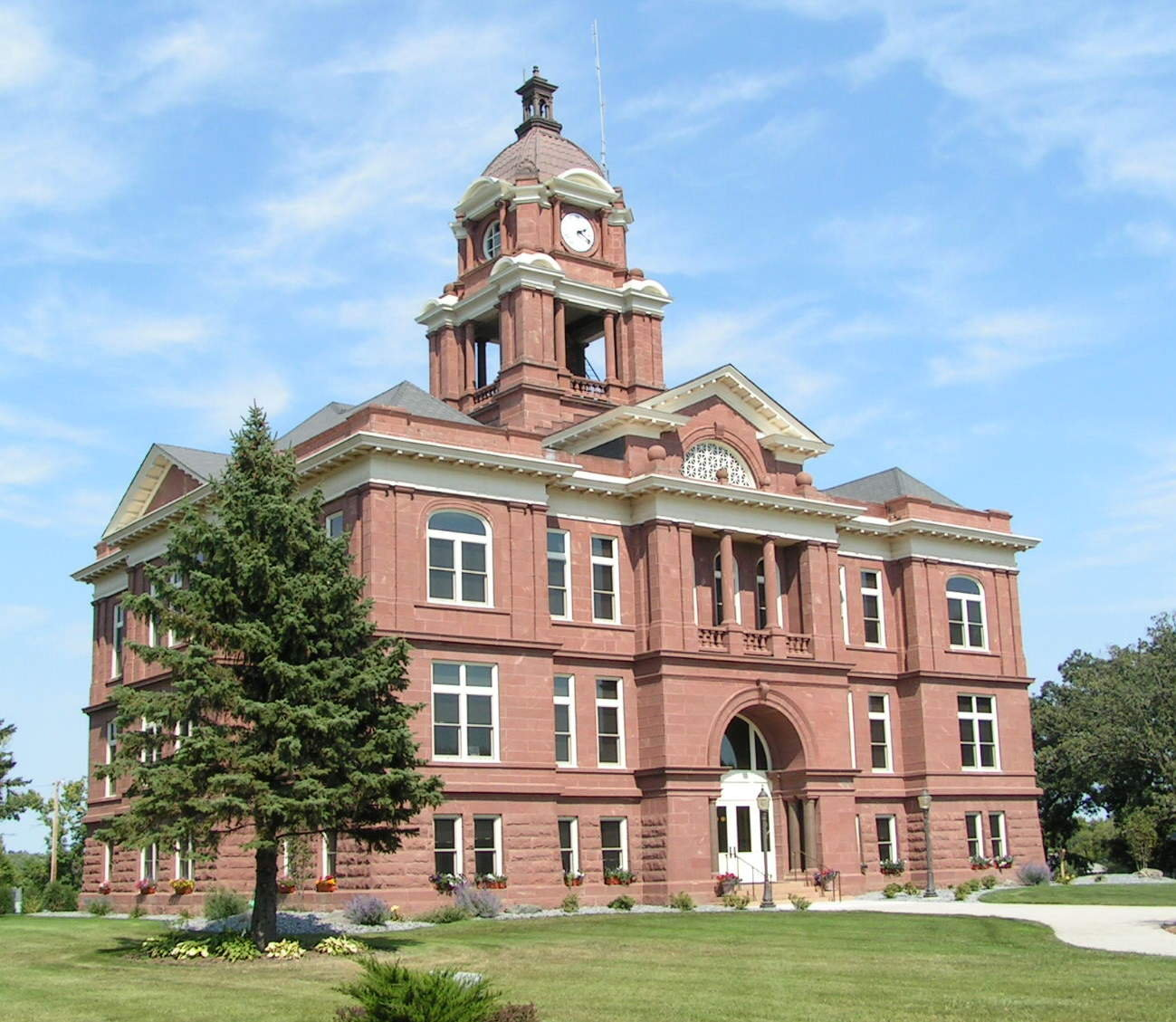

- Location within Minnesota Location within the United States
- Interactive map showing the location of Grant County Courthouse
- Location: 10 2nd St. NE, Elbow Lake, Minnesota
- Coordinates: 45°59′42″N 95°58′35″W
- Area: less than one acre
- Built: 1905
- Built by: Prince Construction Co.
- Architect: Bell & Detweiler
- Architectural style: Beaux Arts, Renaissance
- NRHP reference No.: 85001945
- Added to NRHP: September 5, 1985

The Grant County Courthouse in Elbow Lake, Minnesota, United States, is the county seat of Grant County and is listed on the National Register of Historic Places. This building was opened in 1906, replacing the county's first courthouse which opened in 1878. The original building had four rooms and a hall on the first level, while the courtroom on the second level was accessed by an outside stairway. One source indicated that trials were held in nearby Douglas County until 1883, though.

In 1881, the town of Herman induced the Minnesota Legislature to put a question on the election ballot to move the county seat to Herman. At that time, Elbow Lake was a tiny residential community without railroad access and with little commerce, while Herman had railroad access, several businesses, and a population of several hundred. The election ended up with 439 votes to move the county seat to Herman, versus 369 to keep it in Elbow Lake. This was a total of 808 votes when there were 872 registered voters in the county. Private citizens started building a courthouse in Herman, and when that building was finished, a number of citizens raided the county offices in Elbow Lake and removed all the records to Herman. The election was challenged in court, with Knute Nelson and H. Jenkins representing Elbow Lake and L.W. Collins representing Herman. The investigation revealed that the vote from Erdahl Township had never been counted, Logan Township had turned in more votes than the number of registered voters, and that supporters of Herman had hired workers from Anoka and Minneapolis to work as laborers on the streets and to cast illegitimate votes. There were also six votes from minors and eight votes from men who were not American citizens. On August 19, 1882, the court found in Elbow Lake's favor. Knute Nelson later went on to become a Congressional representative, the governor of Minnesota, and then a U.S. Senator.

Grant County developed rapidly in the 1890s, and county records and business made it necessary to build a bigger building. A tax levy was started in 1899, and in 1904 the county advertised that it was ready for plans. The firm of Bell & Detweiler was chosen. The Prince Construction Company of Minneapolis agreed to construct the building for $60,202, and began construction in spring 1905. The building was completed in April 1906. County attorney E.J. Scofield moved in on May 21, 1906, and the courthouse was formally dedicated on July 23, 1906.

The building has three stories and is designed in a Beaux-Arts architecture style. The towering dome rises 102.5 feet (31.2 m) above ground level, with the building measuring 97 by 75 feet (30 by 23 m). The Portwing brownstone came from a quarry near Duluth. It has a slate roof, terrazzo floors, pink Tennessee marble wainscoting in the main corridor, and marble borders in other corridors.

A suspicious incident happened in July 2005, when three men dressed as Grant County Highway Department workers stole the cornerstone from the building in the early morning. The citizens of Herman were suspected again, even though it had been 123 years since the courthouse was relocated to Elbow Lake. A few days later, the cornerstone turned up at the Grant County Fair in Herman, where fairgoers could pay a $20 donation to get their photo taken with the stolen cornerstone. The money went to the Grant County Historical Society, and the cornerstone was later returned to Elbow Lake.

Courthouse interior

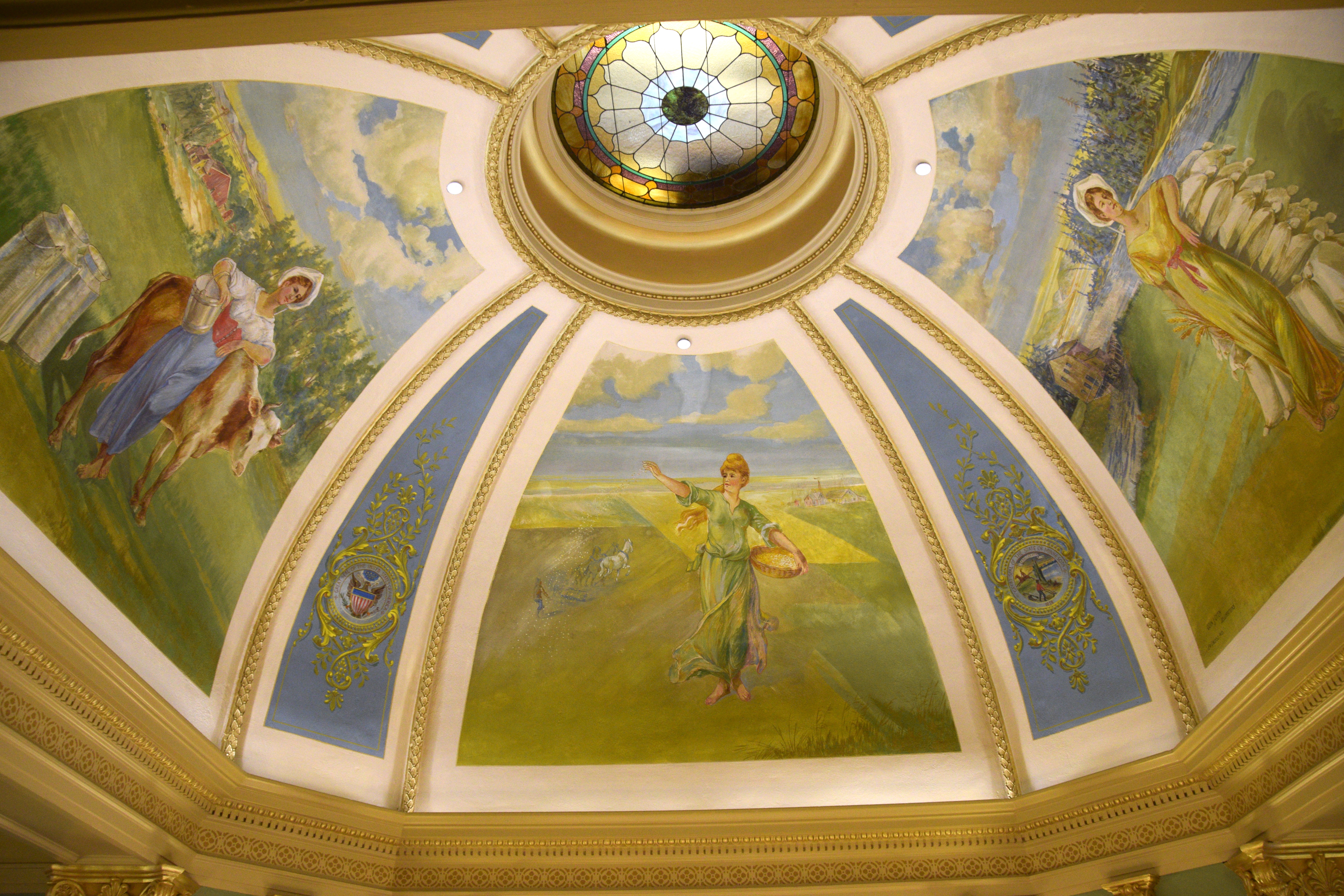

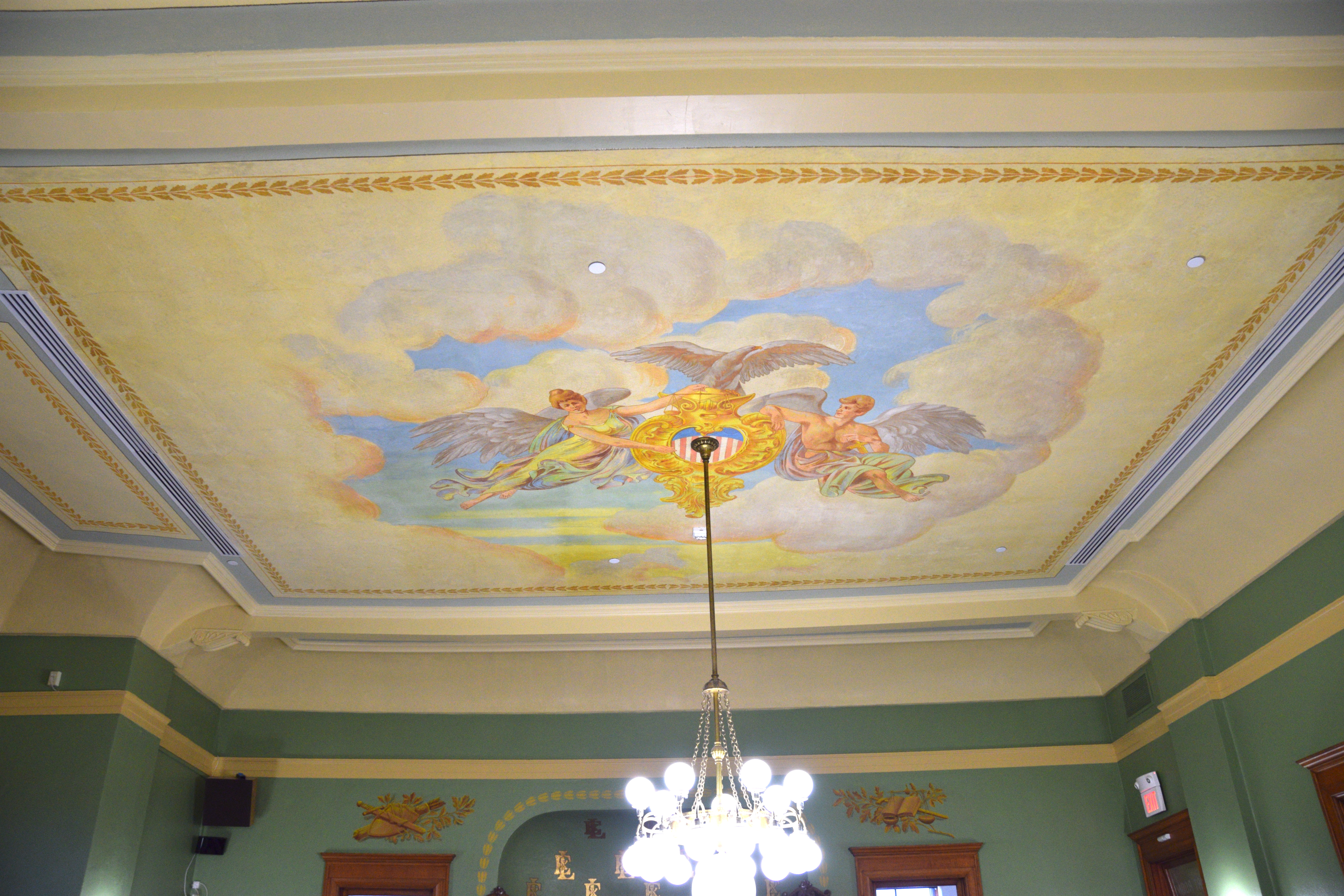

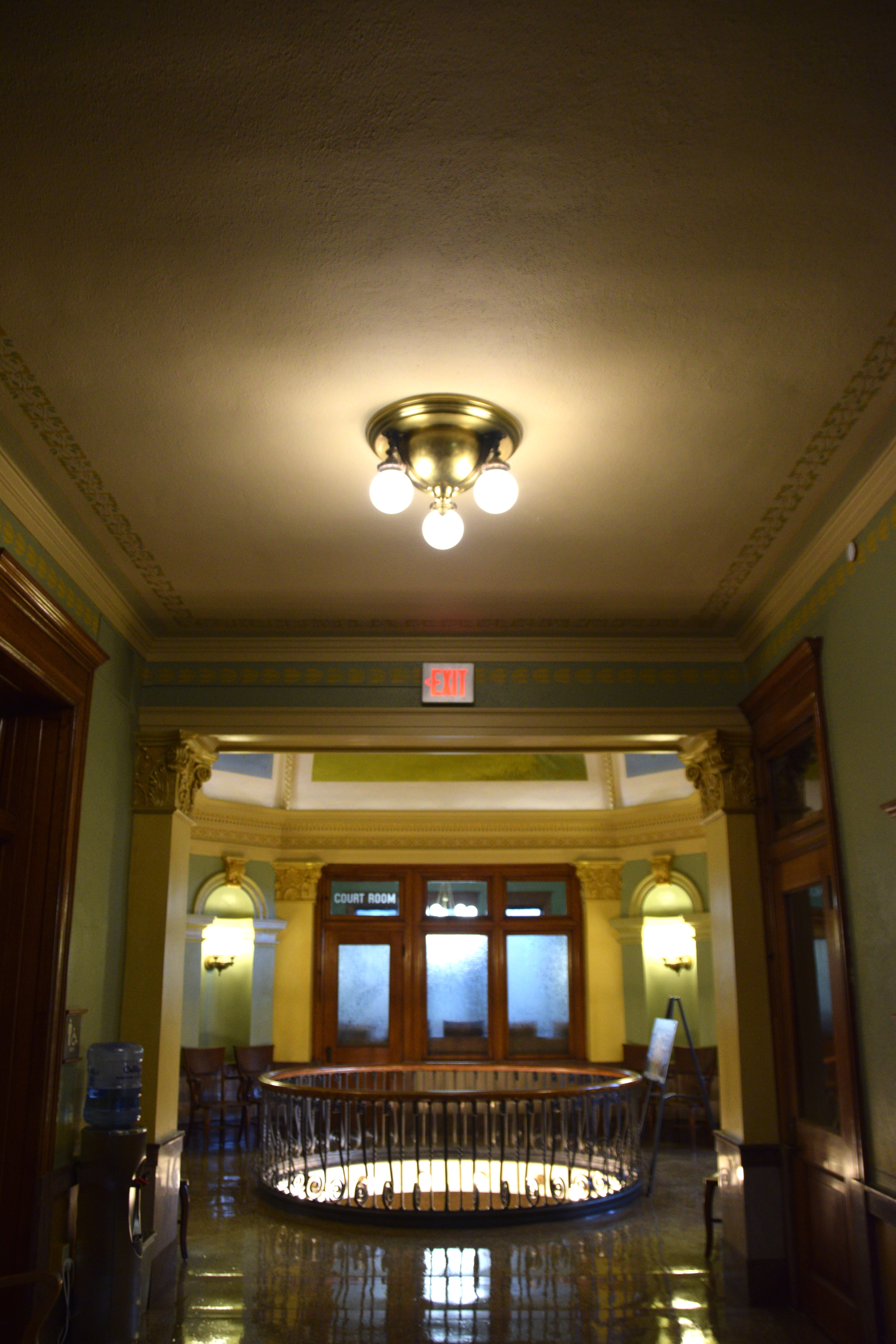

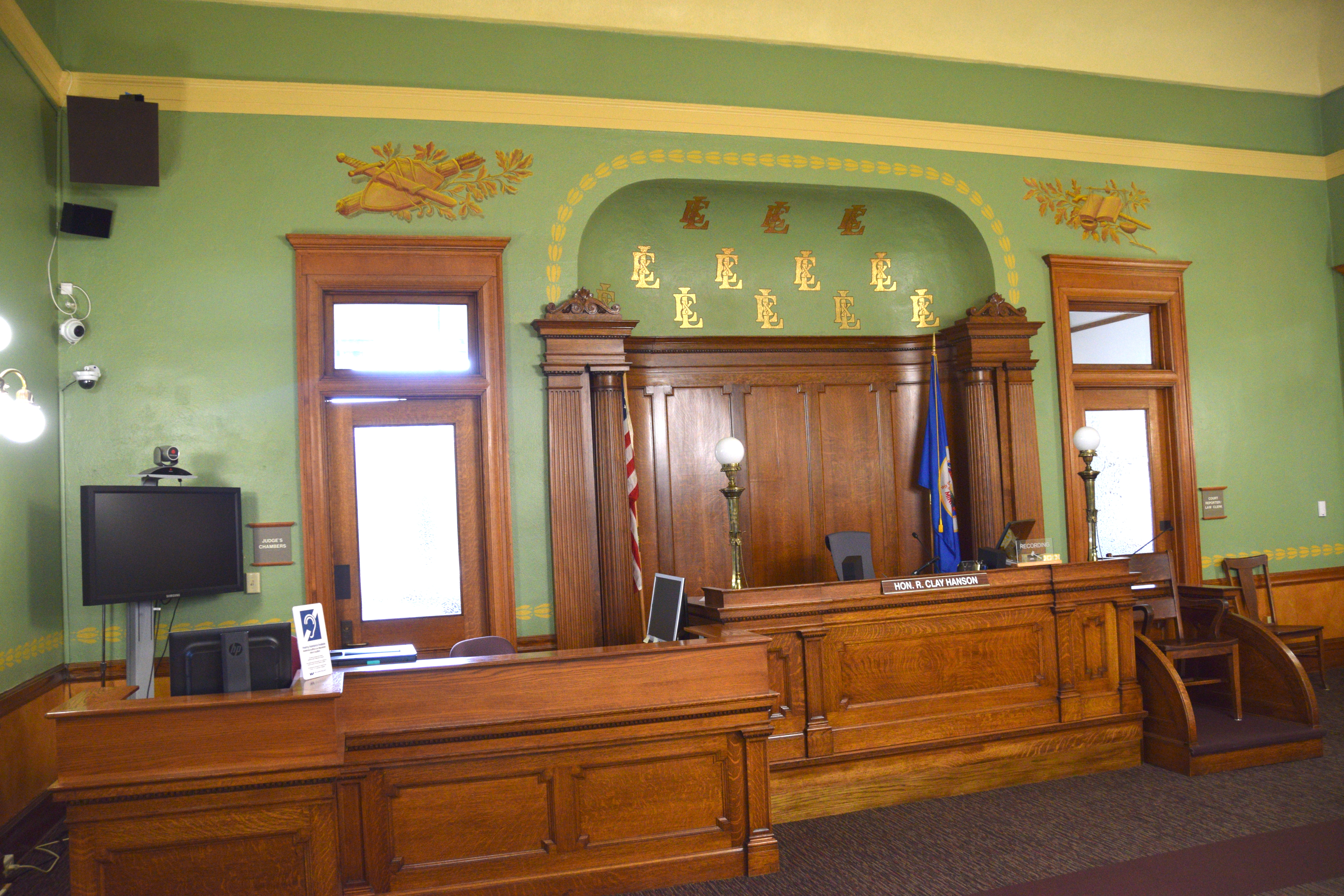

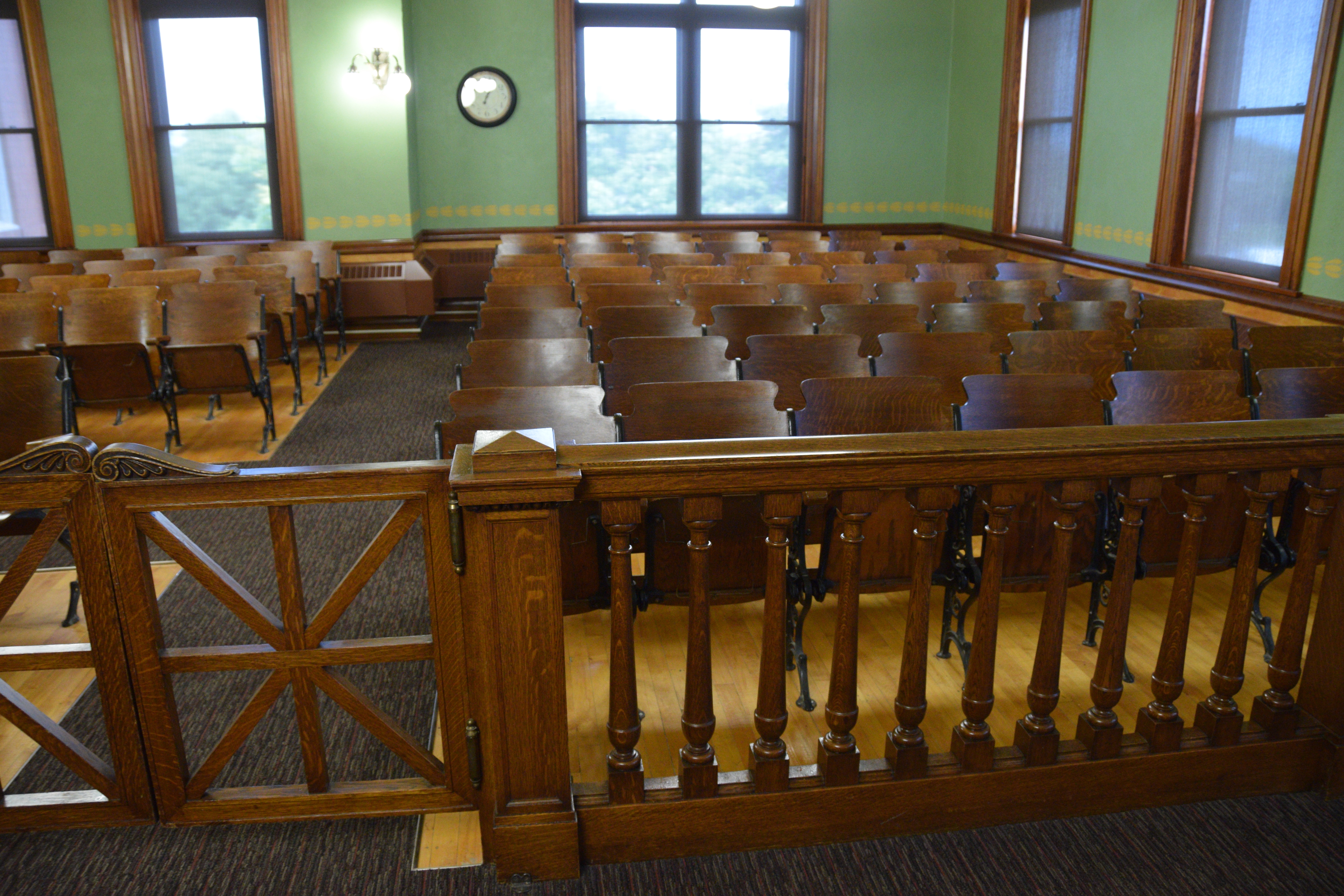
