= Evansville Township, Douglas County, Minnesota =

Evansville Township, Minnesota
- Township
- Location within the state of Minnesota Evansville Township, Minnesota (the United States)
- Coordinates: 45°58′53″N 95°41′24″W
- Country: United States
- State: Minnesota
- County: Douglas

Area
  - Total: 35.4 sq mi (91.6 km^{2})
  - Land: 32.6 sq mi (84.5 km^{2})
  - Water: 2.7 sq mi (7.1 km^{2})
- Elevation: 1,316 ft (401 m)

Population (2000)
  - Total: 244
  - Density: 7.5/sq mi (2.9/km^{2})
- Time zone: UTC-6 (Central (CST))
  - Summer (DST): UTC-5 (CDT)
- ZIP code: 56326
- Area code: 218
- FIPS code: 27-19916
- GNIS feature ID: 0664116

Evansville Township is a township in Douglas County, Minnesota, United States. The population was 222 at the 2020 census.

Evansville Township was organized in 1868, and named for a mail carrier named Evans who was killed by Indians.

== Geography ==
According to the United States Census Bureau, the township has a total area of 35.4 square miles (92 km^{2}), of which 32.6 square miles (84 km^{2}) is land and 2.7 square miles (7.0 km^{2}) (7.75%) is water.

== Demographics ==
As of the census of 2000, there were 244 people, 83 households, and 70 families residing in the township. The population density was 7.5 inhabitants per square mile (2.9/km^{2}). There were 96 housing units at an average density of 2.9 per square mile (1.1/km^{2}). The racial makeup of the township was 99.59% White, and 0.41% from two or more races.

There were 83 households, out of which 42.2% had children under the age of 18 living with them, 80.7% were married couples living together, 1.2% had a female householder with no husband present, and 14.5% were non-families. 14.5% of all households were made up of individuals, and 3.6% had someone living alone who was 65 years of age or older. The average household size was 2.94 and the average family size was 3.24.

In the township the population was spread out, with 32.0% under the age of 18, 6.6% from 18 to 24, 22.5% from 25 to 44, 29.5% from 45 to 64, and 9.4% who were 65 years of age or older. The median age was 37 years. For every 100 females, there were 112.2 males. For every 100 females age 18 and over, there were 112.8 males.

The median income for a household in the township was $48,750, and the median income for a family was $48,750. Males had a median income of $28,000 versus $26,250 for females. The per capita income for the township was $17,601. About 14.1% of families and 14.3% of the population were below the poverty line, including 19.7% of those under the age of eighteen and 47.4% of those 65 or over.
