= Battle Lake, Minnesota =

City in Minnesota, United States

Battle Lake
- City
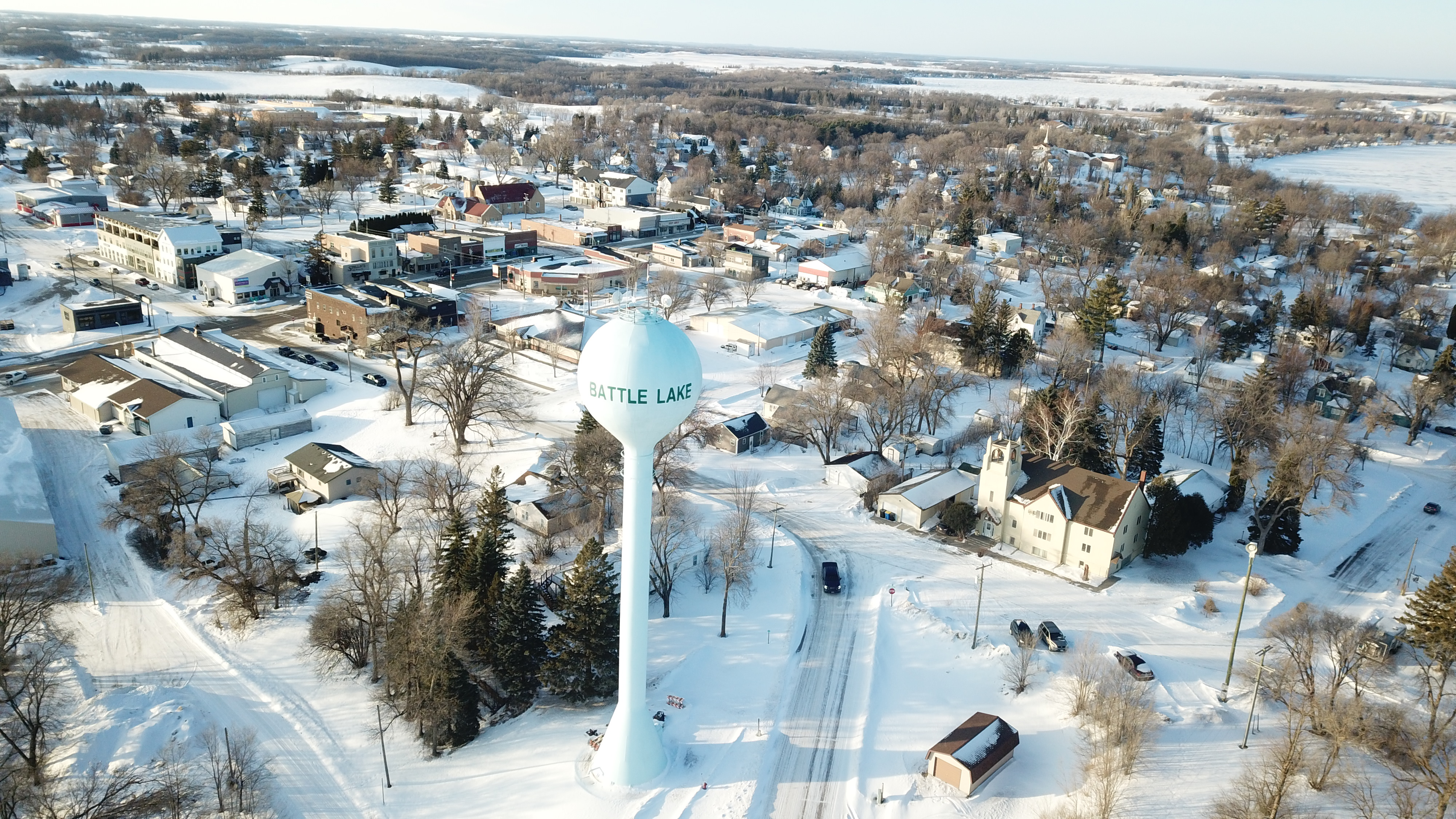
- Motto: "Heart Of 1001 Lakes" Battle Lake January 2025

- Location of Battle Lake, Minnesota
- Coordinates: 46°17′06″N 95°43′07″W
- Country: United States
- State: Minnesota
- County: Otter Tail

Area
  - Total: 1.44 sq mi (3.73 km^{2})
  - Land: 1.44 sq mi (3.72 km^{2})
  - Water: 0.0039 sq mi (0.01 km^{2})
- Elevation: 1,381 ft (421 m)

Population (2020)
  - Total: 857
  - Estimate (2021): 854
  - Density: 596.4/sq mi (230.28/km^{2})
- Time zone: UTC-6 (CST)
  - Summer (DST): UTC-5 (CDT)
- ZIP code: 56515
- Area code: 218
- FIPS code: 27-03970
- GNIS feature ID: 2394083
- Website: battlelakemn.org

Battle Lake is a city in Otter Tail County, Minnesota, United States. The population was 857 according to the 2020 census.

== History ==
Battle Lake, Minnesota is named after the mesotrophic lake of which it borders. It was first referenced by early French cartographers as "Lac du Battaile" with the area being the site of numerous Native American conflicts or battles. It likely draws reference to the Ojibwe and Dakota people in 1795 during the Dakota-Ojibwe War. "Battle Lake" was first anglicized by Joseph Nicolas Nicollet when displayed on his hydrographic map of the Mississippi Valley in 1843. The town of Battle Lake was first platted on October 31st, 1881 by Torger and Bertha Olson when the Northern Pacific Railway was building a track and station through the couple's homesteaded land. The railway and station contributed to Battle Lake growing into a railway village or Railway town, though the train and station were later moved.

== Geography ==
According to the United States Census Bureau, the city has a total area of 1.47 square miles (3.81 km^{2}), all land.

== Demographics ==
Historical population
Census	Pop.	Note	%±
1900	420		—
1910	567		35.0%
1920	628		10.8%
1930	552		−12.1%
1940	623		12.9%
1950	714		14.6%
1960	733		2.7%
1970	772		5.3%
1980	708		−8.3%
1990	698		−1.4%
2000	686		−1.7%
2010	875		27.6%
2020	857		−2.1%
2021 (est.)	854		−0.4%
U.S. Decennial Census; 2020 Census

=== 2020 census ===
As of the census of 2020, there were 857 people, 299 households, and 506 housing units. The population density was 654 inhabitants per square mile (253/km^{2}). The racial makeup of the city was 94.7% White, 2.9% two or more races, 1.2% Hispanic, 0.7% Black, 0.2% Asian, and 0.3% other races.

There were 299 households with an average family size of 2.47. 53.2% were married couples living together, 31.8% had a female householder with no spouse present, and 9.7% had a male householder with no spouse present.

The median age in the city was 60.3 years. 16.3% of the residents were under the age of 18.

=== 2010 census ===
As of the census of 2010, there were 875 people, 386 households, and 215 families living in the city. The population density was 595.2 inhabitants per square mile (229.8/km^{2}). There were 486 housing units at an average density of 330.6 per square mile (127.6/km^{2}). The racial makeup of the city was 97.7% White, 0.3% African American, 0.5% Native American, 0.3% Asian, and 1.1% from two or more races. Hispanic or Latino of any race were 0.2% of the population.

There were 386 households, of which 25.6% had children under the age of 18 living with them, 44.8% were married couples living together, 8.3% had a female householder with no husband present, 2.6% had a male householder with no wife present, and 44.3% were non-families. 40.4% of all households were made up of individuals, and 26.5% of households were individuals 65 years old or older living alone. The average household size was 2.13 and the average family size was 2.91.

The median age in the city was 49.5 years. 23% of residents were under the age of 18; 4% were between the ages of 18 and 24; 17% were from 25 to 44; 22.4% were from 45 to 64; and 33.6% were 65 years of age or older. The gender makeup of the city was 45.0% male and 55.0% female.

=== 2000 census ===
As of the census of 2000, there were 686 people, 327 households, and 192 families living in the city. The population density was 571.3 inhabitants per square mile (220.6/km^{2}). There were 407 housing units at an average density of 338.9/sq mi (131.0/km^{2}). The racial makeup of the city was 98.54% White, 0.29% African American, 0.15% Native American, 0.44% Asian, and 0.58% from two or more races. Hispanic or Latino of any race were 1.46% of the population.

There were 327 households, out of which 23.2% had children under the age of 18 living with them, 49.8% were married couples living together, 6.7% had a female householder with no husband present, and 41.0% were non-families. 39.1% of all households were made up of individuals, and 26.3% of households were individuals 65 years old or older living alone. The average household size was 2.10 and the average family size was 2.79.

In the city, the age breakdown was 21.7% under the age of 18, 4.4% from 18 to 24, 20.8% from 25 to 44, 21.0% from 45 to 64, and 32.1% who were 65 years of age or older. The median age was 48 years. For every 100 females, there were 86.9 males. For every 100 females age 18 and over, there were 78.4 males.

The median income for a household in the city was $25,000, and the median income for a family was $36,250. Males had a median income of $27,333 versus $20,313 for females. The per capita income for the city was $17,269. About 8.6% of families and 13.3% of the population were below the poverty line, including 15.2% of those under age 18 and 14.0% of those age 65 or over.

== Economy ==
The city of Battle Lake employs 260 people, per the 2020 Census.

Its largest industries are in health and social care. The median household income stood at $40,667, less than the median annual income of $65,712 across the entire country. Agriculture, forestry, fishing, hunting and mining are the city's highest paid industries, averaging $72,813.

== Arts and culture ==
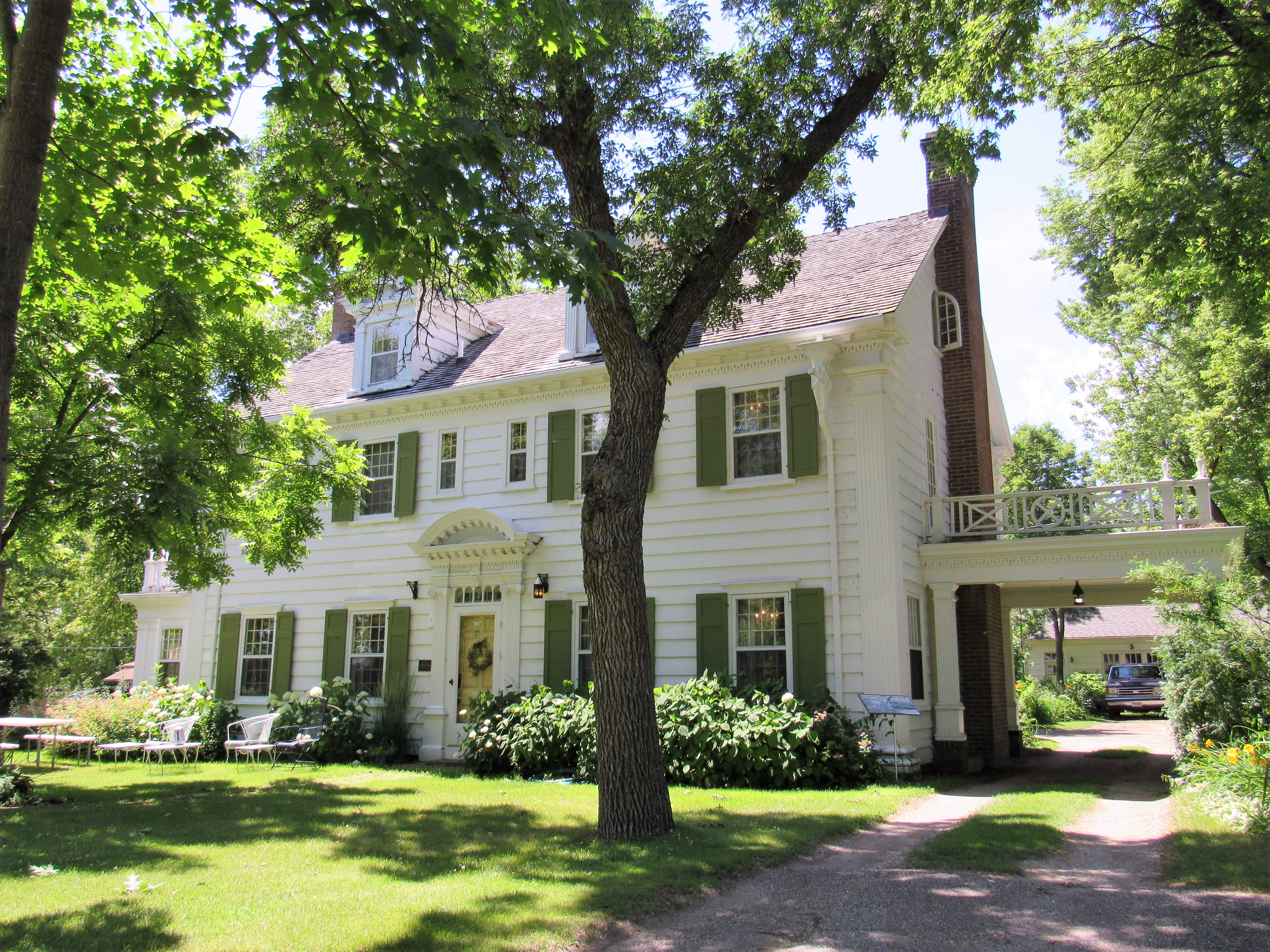
Prospect House and Civil War Museum

=== Museums and other points of interest ===
The Prospect House and Civil War Museum was founded to share the story of “Cap” Colehour, Civil War Veteran and entrepreneur, who settled in the community of Battle Lake after the Civil War. The Prospect House was built in 1882 by Colehour, and the home's furnishings and decor have not been changed since its last remodel in 1929 by Colehour's daughter.

Historic Fort Juelson is 10 minutes drive away from Battle Lake, it was erected in 1876 after the death of George Armstrong Custer at the Battle of Little Bighorn out of fears of a Native American Uprising.

=== Fiction ===
The Murder-by-Month Mysteries, written by Jess Lourey, are set in Battle Lake.

== Parks and recreation ==
Glendalough State Park is located three miles from Battle Lake. The 1,924-acre area was designated as a State Park in 1991. The park centers on Annie Battle Lake, a 335-acre (136 ha) lake designated as a Heritage Fishery. The surrounding area includes woodland and hiking trails, as well as the Glendalough Trail, a 12-mile (19 km) bike loop connecting to Battle Lake town. Rentals for bicycles, watercraft, and camping equipment are available at the park. The property was a game farm during much of the 20th Century. It was long owned by the Minneapolis Star and Tribune, and featured a large enclosure of exotic birds - including peacocks and Chukar Partridges. The City of Battle Lake owns and operates three city parks: Lions Park, Halverson Park, and Sand Bay Park.

== Education ==
Battle Lake Public Schools are part of the Battle Lake Public School District. The district has an elementary school and a secondary school.

== Infrastructure ==
=== Transportation ===
Minnesota State Highway 210 travels east-west serving as a major transportation corridor for the community. Additionally, Minnesota State Highway 78 services north-south travel.
