= Dent, Minnesota =

City in Minnesota, United States

Dent
- City
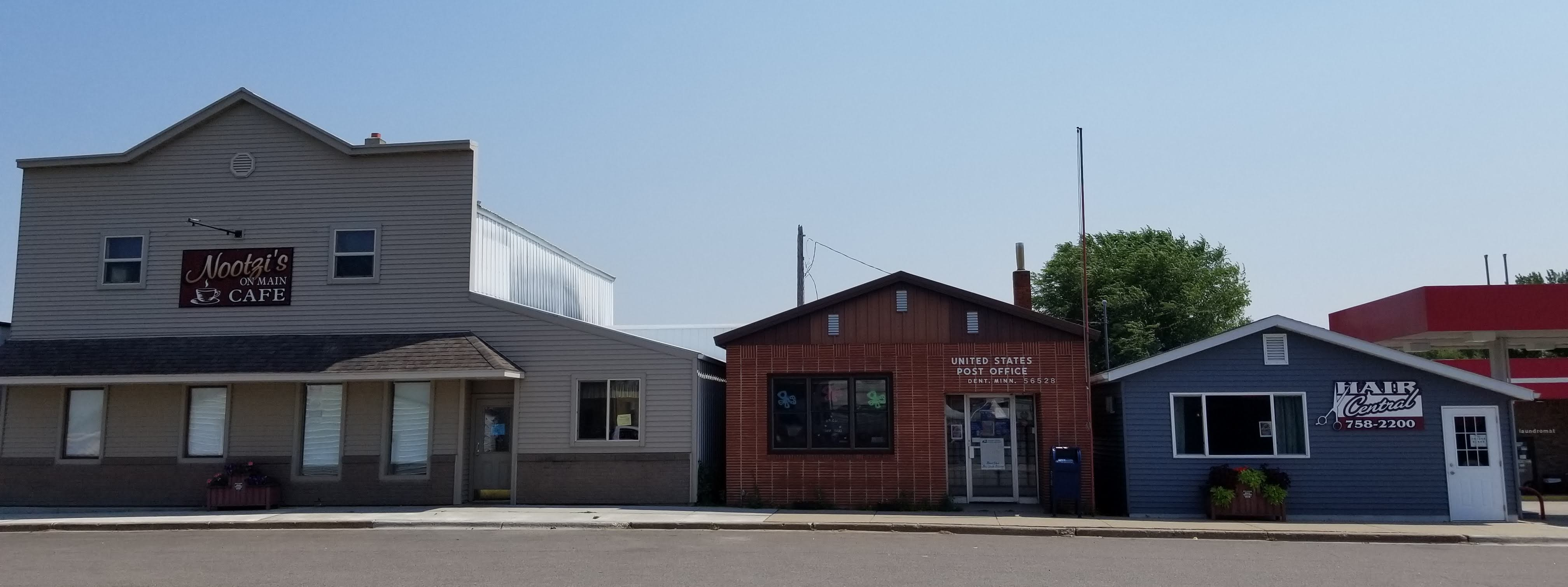
- Businesses on Dent's Main Street.

- Location of Dent, Minnesota
- Coordinates: 46°33′11″N 95°43′08″W
- Country: United States
- State: Minnesota
- County: Otter Tail
- Founded: 1903
- Incorporated: September 6, 1904

Area
  - Total: 0.37 sq mi (0.95 km^{2})
  - Land: 0.36 sq mi (0.94 km^{2})
  - Water: 0.0039 sq mi (0.01 km^{2})
- Elevation: 1,368 ft (417 m)

Population (2020)
  - Total: 173
  - Estimate (2021): 170
  - Density: 478.3/sq mi (184.66/km^{2})
- Time zone: UTC-6 (CST)
  - Summer (DST): UTC-5 (CDT)
- ZIP code: 56528
- Area code: 218
- FIPS code: 27-15724
- GNIS feature ID: 2394517

Dent is a city in Otter Tail County, Minnesota, United States. The population was 173 at the 2020 census.

== History ==
A post office called Dent has been in operation since 1900. Dent was platted in 1903, and was incorporated on September 6, 1904. The name's origin is obscure; some say it came from Henry Dent, a railroad official.

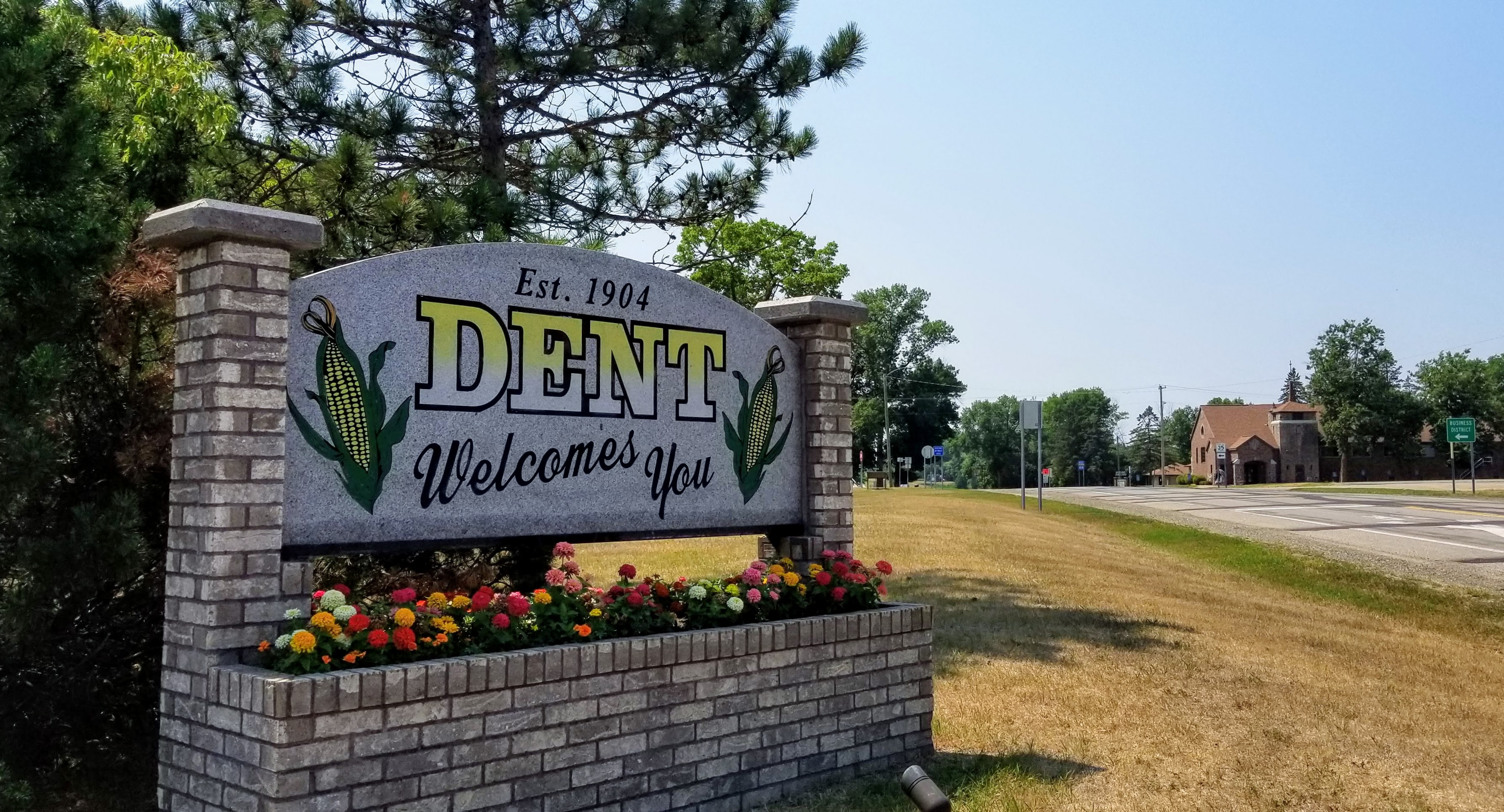
Sign welcoming visitors to Dent.

== Geography ==
According to the United States Census Bureau, the city has an area of 0.38 square miles (0.98 km^{2}), all land.

The area is mainly flat, with several ponds and lakes surrounding the outskirts of downtown. Minnesota State Highway 108 serves as a main route in the community.

== Demographics ==
Historical population
Census	Pop.	Note	%±
1910	244		—
1920	221		−9.4%
1930	224		1.4%
1940	204		−8.9%
1950	187		−8.3%
1960	176		−5.9%
1970	156		−11.4%
1980	167		7.1%
1990	177		6.0%
2000	192		8.5%
2010	192		0.0%
2020	173		−9.9%
2021 (est.)	170		−1.7%
U.S. Decennial Census; 2020 Census

=== 2010 census ===
As of the census of 2010, there were 192 people, 78 households, and 53 families living in the city. The population density was 505.3 inhabitants per square mile (195.1/km^{2}). There were 88 housing units at an average density of 231.6 per square mile (89.4/km^{2}). The racial makeup of the city was 95.3% White, 1.0% Native American, and 3.6% from two or more races. Hispanic or Latino of any race were 1.0% of the population.

There were 78 households, out of which 29.5% had children under the age of 18 living with them, 52.6% were married couples living together, 10.3% had a female householder with no husband present, 5.1% had a male householder with no wife present, and 32.1% were non-families. 26.9% of all households were made up of individuals, and 7.6% had someone living alone who was 65 years of age or older. The average household size was 2.46 and the average family size was 2.92.

The median age in the city was 38.3 years. 25.5% of residents were under the age of 18; 8.3% were between the ages of 18 and 24; 22.4% were from 25 to 44; 29.2% were from 45 to 64; and 14.6% were 65 years of age or older. The gender makeup of the city was 45.8% male and 54.2% female.

=== 2000 census ===
As of the census of 2000, there were 194 people, 77 households, and 49 families living in the city. The population density was 501.0 inhabitants per square mile (193.4/km^{2}). There were 80 housing units at an average density of 208.7 per square mile (80.6/km^{2}). The racial makeup of the city was 100.00% White.

There were 77 households, out of which 33.8% had children under the age of 18 living with them, 57.1% were married couples living together, 3.9% had a female householder with no husband present, and 35.1% were non-families. 32.5% of all households were made up of individuals, and 14.3% had someone living alone who was 65 years of age or older. The average household size was 2.49 and the average family size was 3.18.

In the city, the population was spread out, with 28.6% under the age of 18, 5.7% from 18 to 24, 30.2% from 25 to 44, 20.3% from 45 to 64, and 15.1% who were 65 years of age or older. The median age was 37 years. For every 100 females, there were 93.9 males. For every 100 females age 18 and over, there were 104.5 males.

The median income for a household in the city was $30,938, and the median income for a family was $34,167. Males had a median income of $27,321 versus $15,417 for females. The per capita income for the city was $12,024. About 3.7% of families and 12.9% of the population were below the poverty line, including 14.1% of those under the age of eighteen and 20.7% of those 65 or over.
