= Ashby, Minnesota =

City in Minnesota, United States

Ashby
- City
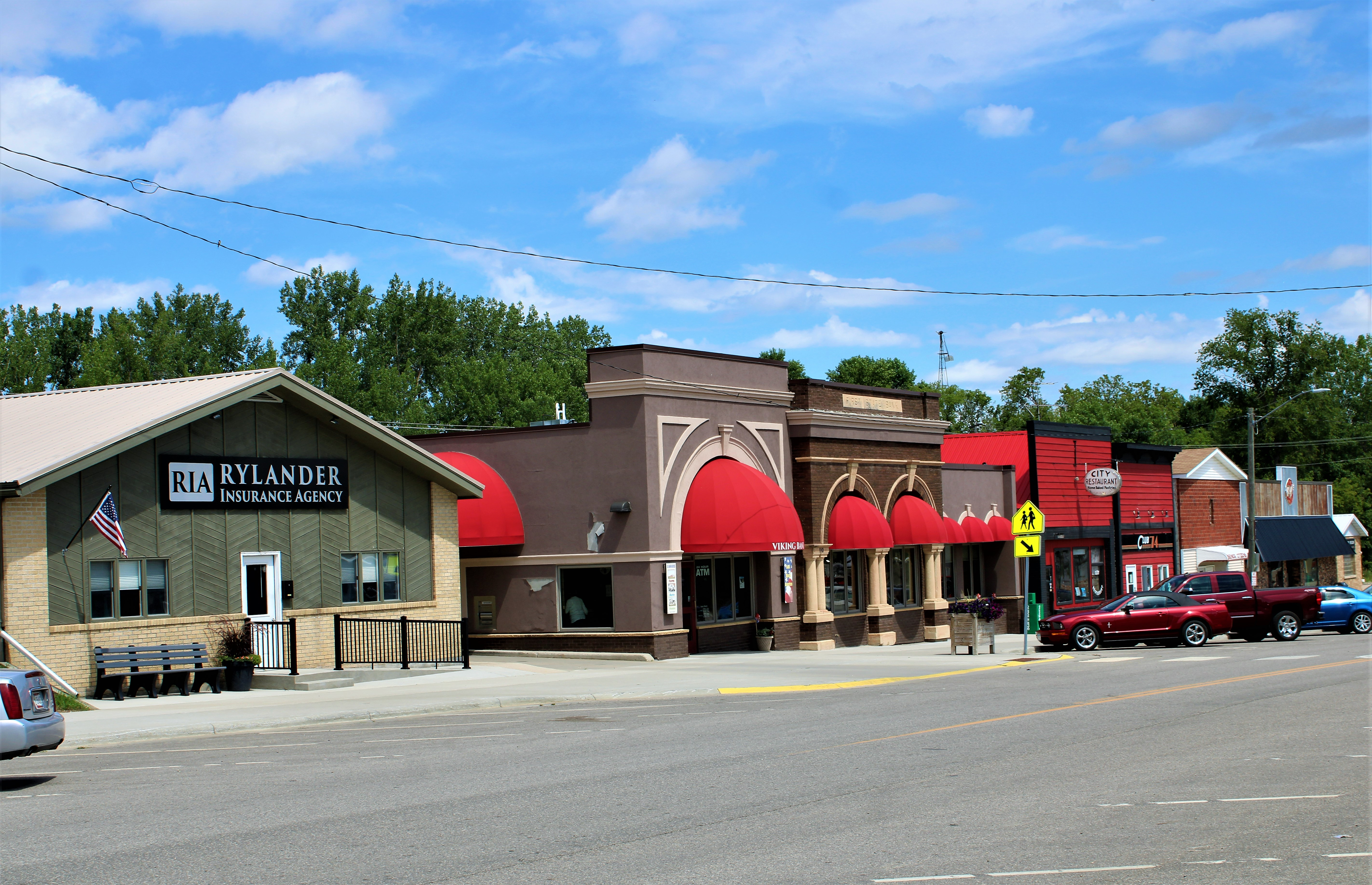
- Buildings on the north side of Main Street
- Motto: You'll Like Ashby
- Location of Ashby, Minnesota
- Coordinates: 46°05′35″N 95°48′56″W
- Country: United States
- State: Minnesota
- County: Grant

Area
  - Total: 0.59 sq mi (1.53 km^{2})
  - Land: 0.55 sq mi (1.43 km^{2})
  - Water: 0.039 sq mi (0.10 km^{2})
- Elevation: 1,286 ft (392 m)

Population (2020)
  - Total: 469
  - Density: 850.8/sq mi (328.48/km^{2})
- Time zone: UTC-6 (Central (CST))
  - Summer (DST): UTC-5 (CDT)
- ZIP code: 56309
- Area code: 218
- FIPS code: 27-02422
- GNIS feature ID: 2393997
- Website: ashbyminnesota.org

Ashby is a city in northeastern Grant County, Minnesota, United States. The population was 469 at the 2020 census.

== History ==
Ashby was platted in 1879, and named for Gunder Ash, an early Norwegian settler. Roughly half the city's population is of Norwegian heritage. A post office has been in operation at Ashby since 1880.

On July 8, 2020, areas north of Ashby were struck by a violent EF4 tornado. It killed one person and destroyed three farmsteads.

In 2021, there was an 80-car pileup on Interstate 94 near Ashby.

== Geography ==
According to the United States Census Bureau, the city has an area of 0.59 square miles (1.53 km^{2}), of which 0.55 square miles (1.42 km^{2}) is land and 0.04 square miles (0.10 km^{2}) is water.

Minnesota State Highway 78 serves as a main route in the community. Interstate 94 is nearby.

== Demographics ==
Historical population
Census	Pop.	Note	%±
1890	231		—
1900	279		20.8%
1910	334		19.7%
1920	388		16.2%
1930	358		−7.7%
1940	384		7.3%
1950	443		15.4%
1960	426		−3.8%
1970	415		−2.6%
1980	486		17.1%
1990	469		−3.5%
2000	472		0.6%
2010	446		−5.5%
2020	469		5.2%
U.S. Decennial Census; 2020 Census

=== 2010 census ===
As of the census of 2010, there were 446 people, 197 households, and 132 families residing in the city. The population density was 810.9 inhabitants per square mile (313.1/km^{2}). There were 232 housing units at an average density of 421.8 per square mile (162.9/km^{2}). The racial makeup of the city was 95.3% White, 1.8% African American, 0.4% Asian, 0.2% from other races, and 2.2% from two or more races. Hispanic or Latino of any race were 1.1% of the population.

There were 197 households, of which 26.9% had children under the age of 18 living with them, 53.3% were married couples living together, 10.2% had a female householder with no husband present, 3.6% had a male householder with no wife present, and 33.0% were non-families. 31.5% of all households were made up of individuals, and 17.7% had someone living alone who was 65 years of age or older. The average household size was 2.26 and the average family size was 2.80.

The median age in the city was 43.2 years. 24.2% of residents were under the age of 18; 5.6% were between the ages of 18 and 24; 22.9% were from 25 to 44; 21.7% were from 45 to 64; and 25.6% were 65 years of age or older. The gender makeup of the city was 46.6% male and 53.4% female.

=== 2000 census ===
As of the census of 2000, there were 472 people, 185 households, and 113 families residing in the city. The population density was 883.9 inhabitants per square mile (341.3/km^{2}). There were 202 housing units at an average density of 378.3 per square mile (146.1/km^{2}). The racial makeup of the city was 97.67% White, 0.21% African American, 0.21% Native American, and 1.91% from two or more races.

There were 185 households, out of which 23.8% had children under the age of 18 living with them, 51.9% were married couples living together, 7.0% had a female householder with no husband present, and 38.9% were non-families. 36.2% of all households were made up of individuals, and 27.0% had someone living alone who was 65 years of age or older. The average household size was 2.25 and the average family size was 2.89.

In the city, the population was spread out, with 18.6% under the age of 18, 8.9% from 18 to 24, 19.3% from 25 to 44, 20.6% from 45 to 64, and 32.6% who were 65 years of age or older. The median age was 47 years. For every 100 females, there were 75.5 males. For every 100 females age 18 and over, there were 73.8 males.

The median income for a household in the city was $28,333, and the median income for a family was $39,375. Males had a median income of $31,250 versus $20,104 for females. The per capita income for the city was $15,296. About 8.7% of families and 11.1% of the population were below the poverty line, including 13.1% of those under age 18 and 17.8% of those age 65 or over.

== Community ==
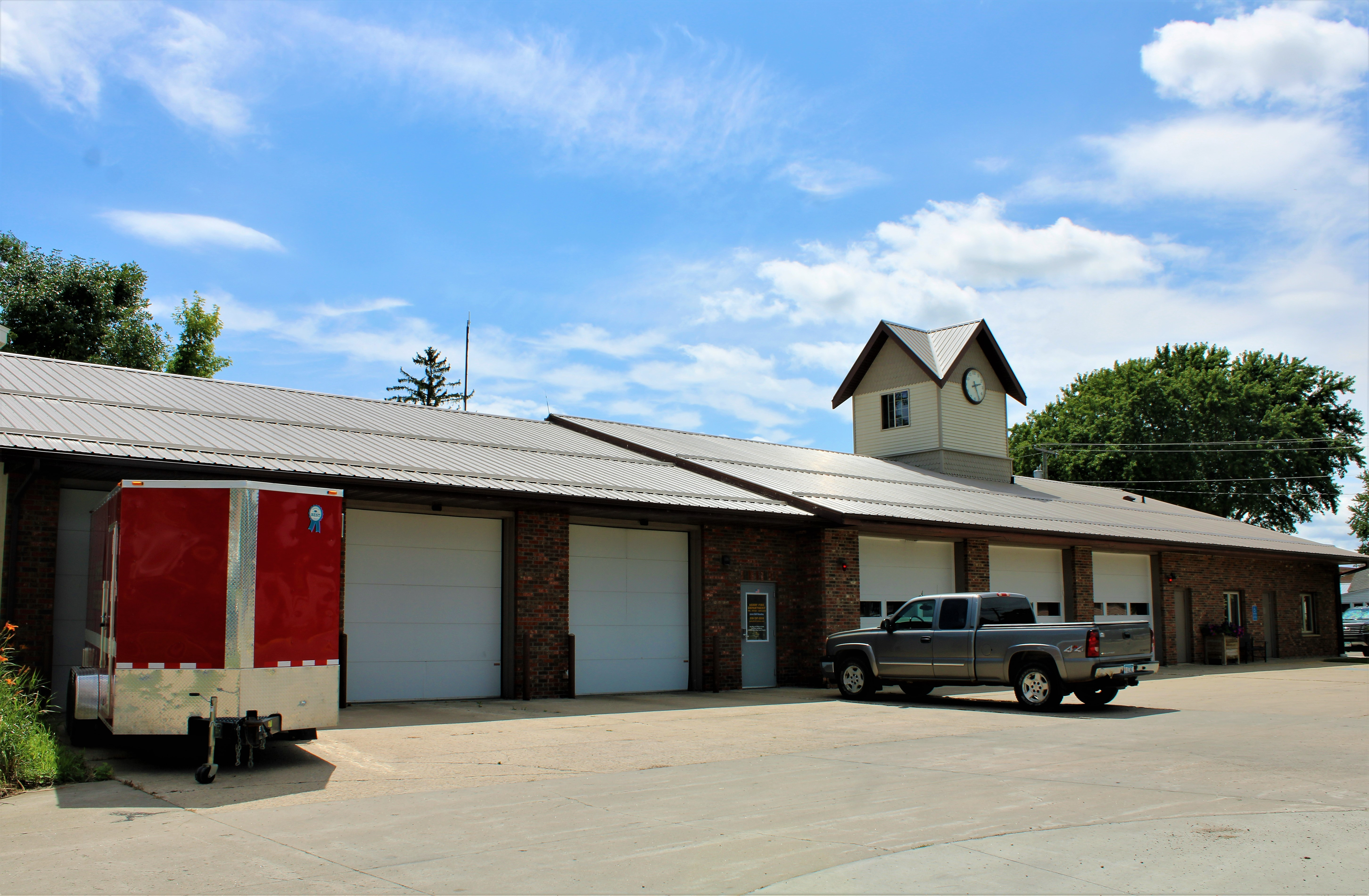
City hall

Ashby's public school is K-12. Known as the "Ashby Arrows", its colors are maroon and gold.

Each year, a local sporting group named "Coots Unlimited"—a parody of Ducks Unlimited—holds a fundraising event with proceeds to rebuild local wildlife habitat. A metal statue of a coot (a duck-like creature) is on the city's southern border.

Ashby is on the eastern fringe of the Red River Valley, which was carved out by ancient glaciers. As a result, it is nested in gently rolling hills and near many good fishing lakes, most prominently Pelican Lake, directly south of Ashby.
