= Perham Township, Otter Tail County, Minnesota =

Perham Township, Minnesota
- Township
- Location of Perham Township, within Otter Tail County, Minnesota

- Location within the state of Minnesota Perham Township, Minnesota (the United States)
- Coordinates: 46°36′0″N 95°34′57″W
- Country: United States
- State: Minnesota
- County: Otter Tail

Area
  - Total: 33.3 sq mi (86.3 km^{2})
  - Land: 31.5 sq mi (81.6 km^{2})
  - Water: 1.8 sq mi (4.7 km^{2})
- Elevation: 1,362 ft (415 m)

Population (2020)
  - Total: 977
  - Density: 31.0/sq mi (12.0/km^{2})
- Time zone: UTC-6 (Central (CST))
  - Summer (DST): UTC-5 (CDT)
- ZIP code: 56573
- Area code: 218
- FIPS code: 27-50488
- GNIS feature ID: 0665285
- Website: https://perhamtownship.gov/

Perham Township is a township in Otter Tail County, Minnesota, United States. The population was 977 at the 2020 census.

Perham Township was originally called Marion Lake Township for the lake in its southwest corner, and under the latter name was organized in 1872. The present name was adopted in 1877 to match that of the village of Perham located therein.

== Geography ==
According to the United States Census Bureau, the township has a total area of 33.3 square miles (86.3 km^{2}), of which 31.5 square miles (81.6 km^{2}) is land and 1.8 square miles (4.7 km^{2}) (5.46%) is water.

== Demographics ==
As of the census of 2000, there were 931 people, 316 households, and 253 families residing in the township. The population density was 29.5 inhabitants per square mile (11.4/km^{2}). There were 389 housing units at an average density of 12.3/sq mi (4.8/km^{2}). The racial makeup of the township was 98.71% White, 0.32% African American, 0.32% Native American, 0.21% from other races, and 0.43% from two or more races. Hispanic or Latino of any race were 4.08% of the population.

There were 316 households, out of which 44.6% had children under the age of 18 living with them, 70.6% were married couples living together, 4.4% had a female householder with no husband present, and 19.9% were non-families. 14.9% of all households were made up of individuals, and 5.4% had someone living alone who was 65 years of age or older. The average household size was 2.95 and the average family size was 3.26.

In the township the population was spread out, with 32.7% under the age of 18, 7.6% from 18 to 24, 27.9% from 25 to 44, 23.3% from 45 to 64, and 8.5% who were 65 years of age or older. The median age was 34 years. For every 100 females, there were 109.7 males. For every 100 females age 18 and over, there were 109.7 males.

The median income for a household in the township was $45,500, and the median income for a family was $52,679. Males had a median income of $33,864 versus $18,869 for females. The per capita income for the township was $20,639. About 2.5% of families and 5.2% of the population were below the poverty line, including 4.3% of those under age 18 and 15.6% of those age 65 or over.
