= Elbow Lake, Grant County, Minnesota =

City in Minnesota, United States

Elbow Lake
- City
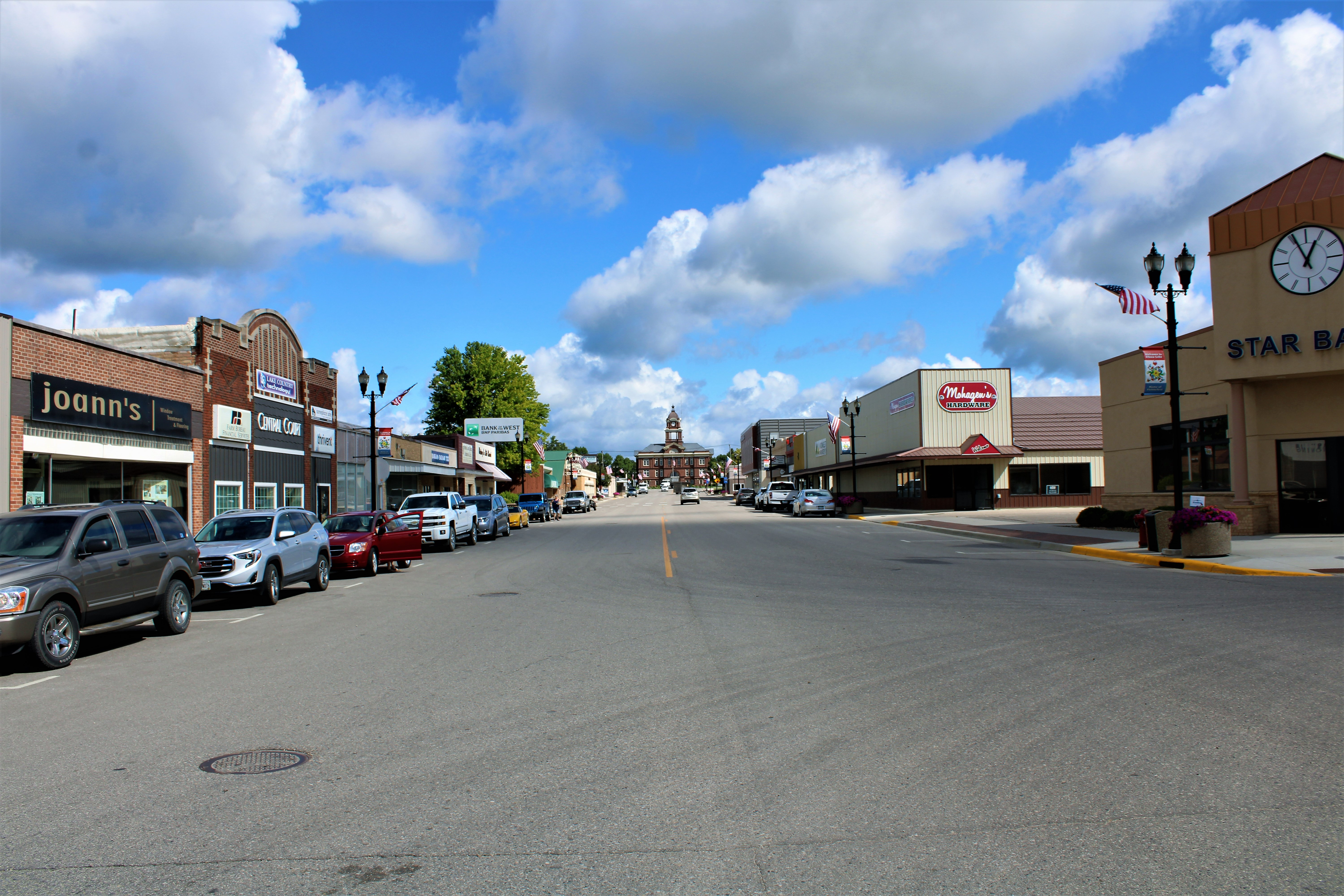
- Central Avenue North in Elbow Lake

- Location of Elbow Lake within Grant County, Minnesota
- Coordinates: 45°59′39″N 95°58′36″W
- Country: United States
- State: Minnesota
- County: Grant
- Founded: 1886
- Incorporated: August 30, 1887

Government
  - Mayor: Deb Hengel

Area
  - Total: 1.76 sq mi (4.55 km^{2})
  - Land: 1.38 sq mi (3.58 km^{2})
  - Water: 0.37 sq mi (0.97 km^{2})
- Elevation: 1,220 ft (372 m)

Population (2020)
  - Total: 1,276
  - Estimate (2022): 1,284
  - Density: 921.9/sq mi (355.93/km^{2})
- Time zone: UTC-6 (Central)
  - Summer (DST): UTC-5 (CDT)
- ZIP code: 56531
- Area code: 218
- FIPS code: 27-18458
- GNIS feature ID: 0643230
- Website: thecityofelbowlake.com

Elbow Lake is a city and county seat of Grant County, Minnesota, United States. The population was 1,276 at the 2020 census.

== History ==
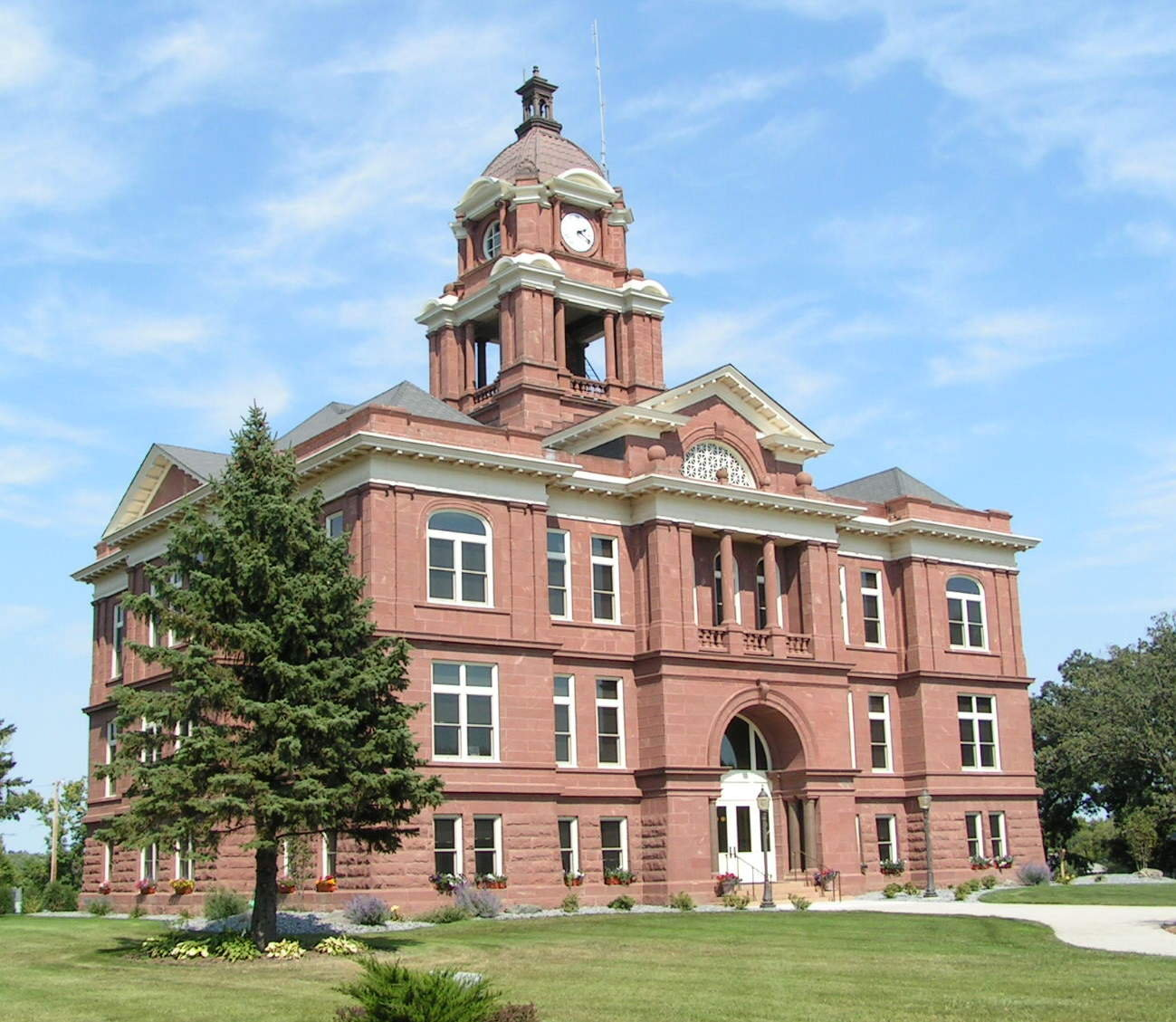
Grant County Courthouse

Elbow Lake was platted in 1886. The city took its name from nearby Elbow Lake.

== Geography ==
According to the United States Census Bureau, the city has an area of 1.34 square miles (3.47 km^{2}), all land.

U.S. Highway 59 and Minnesota State Highways 55 and 79 are four of the main routes in the city. Elbow Lake is 12 miles west of Interstate Highway 94.

Elbow Lake is in telephone area code 218.

== Demographics ==
Historical population
Census	Pop.	Note	%±
1890	267		—
1900	625		134.1%
1910	776		24.2%
1920	867		11.7%
1930	903		4.2%
1940	1,150		27.4%
1950	1,398		21.6%
1960	1,521		8.8%
1970	1,484		−2.4%
1980	1,358		−8.5%
1990	1,186		−12.7%
2000	1,275		7.5%
2010	1,176		−7.8%
2020	1,276		8.5%
2022 (est.)	1,284		0.6%
U.S. Decennial Census; 2020 Census

=== 2010 census ===
As of the census of 2010, there were 1,176 people, 538 households, and 313 families residing in the city. The population density was 877.6 inhabitants per square mile (338.8/km^{2}). There were 623 housing units at an average density of 464.9 per square mile (179.5/km^{2}). The racial makeup of the city was 97.4% White, 0.2% African American, 0.3% Native American, 0.2% Asian, 0.3% from other races, and 1.7% from two or more races. Hispanic or Latino of any race were 1.2% of the population.

There were 538 households, of which 27.7% had children under the age of 18 living with them, 44.8% were married couples living together, 9.9% had a female householder with no husband present, 3.5% had a male householder with no wife present, and 41.8% were non-families. 37.9% of all households were made up of individuals, and 19% had someone living alone who was 65 years of age or older. The average household size was 2.16 and the average family size was 2.86.

The median age in the city was 40.9 years. 24.1% of residents were under the age of 18; 5.8% were between the ages of 18 and 24; 24.3% were from 25 to 44; 26.9% were from 45 to 64, and 18.9% were 65 years of age or older. The gender makeup of the city was 45.1% male and 54.9% female.

=== 2000 census ===
As of the census of 2000, there were 1,275 people, 560 households, and 348 families residing in the city. The population density was 944.9 inhabitants per square mile (364.8/km^{2}). There were 624 housing units at an average density of 462.5 per square mile (178.6/km^{2}). The racial makeup of the city was 97.41% White, 0.24% Native American, 0.47% Asian, 0.78% from other races, and 1.10% from two or more races. Hispanic or Latino of any race were 1.33% of the population.

There were 560 households, out of which 27.9% had children under the age of 18 living with them, 51.6% were married couples living together, 8.8% had a female householder with no husband present, and 37.7% were non-families. 33.9% of all households were made up of individuals, and 23.6% had someone living alone who was 65 years of age or older. The average household size was 2.26 and the average family size was 2.93.

In the city, the population was spread out, with 24.9% under the age of 18, 7.8% from 18 to 24, 25.2% from 25 to 44, 17.4% from 45 to 64, and 24.7% who were 65 years of age or older. The median age was 40 years. For every 100 females, there were 84.5 males. For every 100 females age 18 and over, there were 82.5 males.

The median income for a household in the city was $30,441, and the median income for a family was $38,611. Males had a median income of $28,839 versus $20,515 for females. The per capita income for the city was $16,429. About 6.3% of families and 7.7% of the population were below the poverty line, including 10.7% of those under age 18 and 6.2% of those age 65 or over.

== Education ==
Elbow Lake is part of the West Central Area School system, which includes Barrett, Hoffman, Kensington, Wendell, and many other communities. Elementary school facilities are in Elbow Lake and Kensington, and the secondary school, which opened in 1995, is in Barrett, seven miles from Elbow Lake.

== Parks ==
Elbow Lake has several parks within city limits that offer a variety of recreational opportunities, including softball fields, a volleyball court, lighted tennis courts, an ice skating rink with a warming house, a running track, playground equipment, picnic shelters, and a bandshell for summer entertainment.

The Tipsinah Mounds Campground and park, four miles east of Elbow Lake on Pomme de Terre Lake, has a public swimming beach, playground equipment, hiking and nature trails, and an above-ground tornado shelter. Fairhaven Beach, on Pomme de Terre Lake, is a public swimming beach.

== Libraries ==
Thorson Memorial Public Library is in Elbow Lake. It is Grant County's only library. It is in the Scofield Memorial Building, built in 1933 with funding from the Public Works Administration (PWA) and donated funds. The building was placed on the National Register of Historic Places in 2016.

Thorson Memorial Library is a member of Viking Library Regional Library System.
