= Erdahl Township, Grant County, Minnesota =

Township in Minnesota, United States

Erdahl Township
- Township
- Location within the state of Minnesota Erdahl Township (the United States)
- Coordinates: 45°59′5″N 95°49′17″W
- Country: United States
- State: Minnesota
- County: Grant

Area
  - Total: 35.9 sq mi (93.0 km^{2})
  - Land: 33.9 sq mi (87.7 km^{2})
  - Water: 2.0 sq mi (5.2 km^{2})
- Elevation: 1,257 ft (383 m)

Population (2000)
  - Total: 343
  - Density: 10/sq mi (3.9/km^{2})
- Time zone: UTC-6 (Central (CST))
  - Summer (DST): UTC-5 (CDT)
- ZIP code: 56531
- Area code: 218
- FIPS code: 27-19538
- GNIS feature ID: 0664103

Erdahl Township is a township in Grant County, Minnesota, United States. The population was 343 at the 2000 census.

== History ==
Erdahl Township was organized in 1877, and supposedly named after "a district in Norway".

== Geography ==
According to the United States Census Bureau, the township has a total area of 35.9 square miles (93 km^{2}), of which 33.9 square miles (88 km^{2}) is land and 2.0 square miles (5.2 km^{2}) (5.66%) is water.

== Demographics ==
As of the census of 2000, there were 343 people, 132 households, and 107 families residing in the township. The population density was 10.1 inhabitants per square mile (3.9/km^{2}). There were 186 housing units at an average density of 5.5 per square mile (2.1/km^{2}). The racial makeup of the township was 99.13% White, 0.29% Native American, and 0.58% from two or more races.

There were 132 households, out of which 33.3% had children under the age of 18 living with them, 70.5% were married couples living together, 4.5% had a female householder with no husband present, and 18.9% were non-families. 16.7% of all households were made up of individuals, and 5.3% had someone living alone who was 65 years of age or older. The average household size was 2.60 and the average family size was 2.91.

In the township the population was spread out, with 24.2% under the age of 18, 5.8% from 18 to 24, 24.8% from 25 to 44, 28.9% from 45 to 64, and 16.3% who were 65 years of age or older. The median age was 42 years. For every 100 females, there were 105.4 males. For every 100 females age 18 and over, there were 120.3 males.

The median income for a household in the township was $38,125, and the median income for a family was $40,208. Males had a median income of $27,159 versus $30,125 for females. The per capita income for the township was $16,959. About 9.5% of families and 8.7% of the population were below the poverty line, including 9.0% of those under age 18 and 18.8% of those age 65 or over.
