= Evansville, Minnesota =

City in Minnesota, United States

Evansville
- City
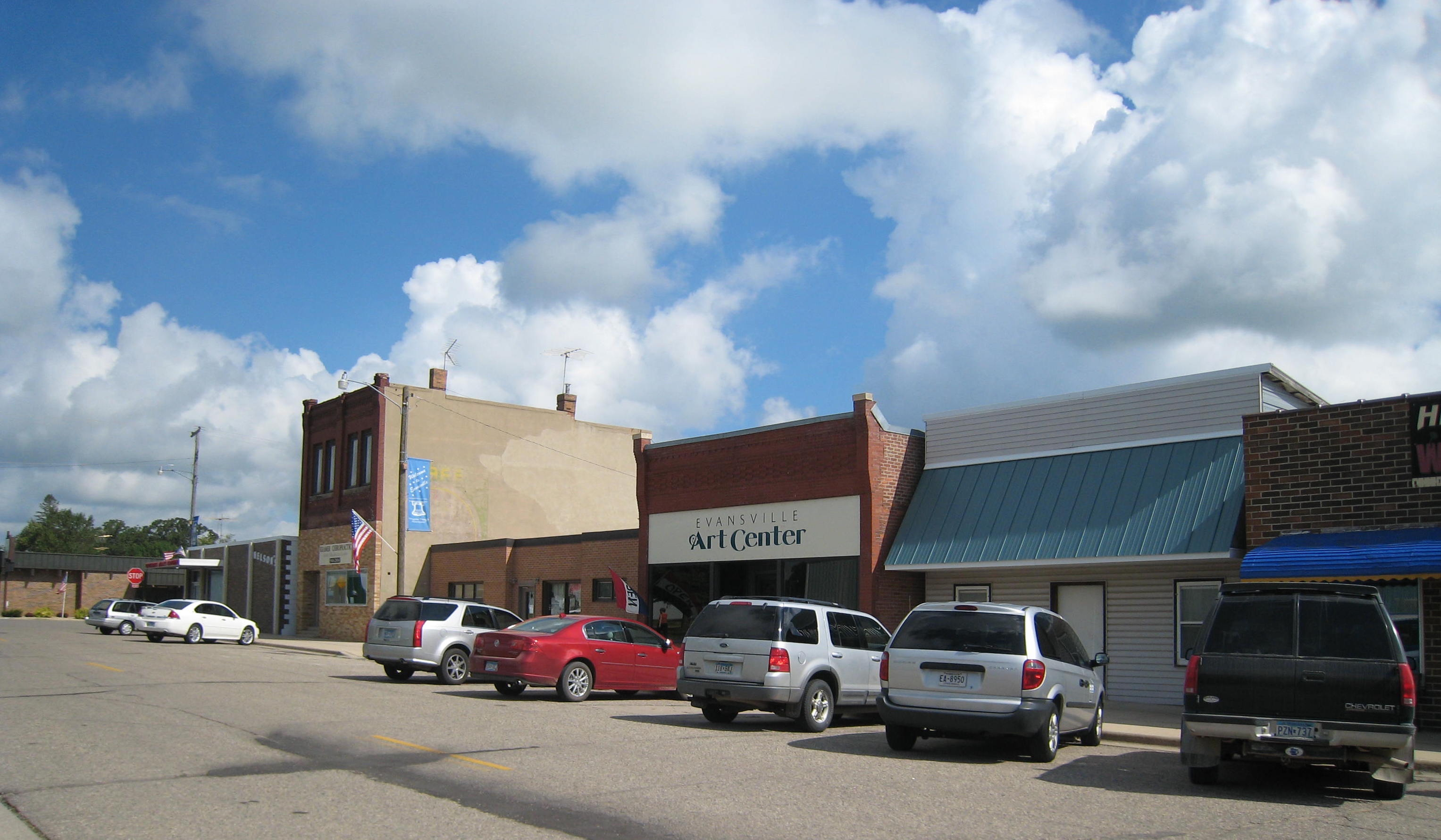
- Businesses on Main Street
- Motto: "Progress Through Perseverance"
- Location of Evansville, Minnesota
- Coordinates: 46°00′22″N 95°41′13″W
- Country: United States
- State: Minnesota
- County: Douglas

Area
  - Total: 0.79 sq mi (2.04 km^{2})
  - Land: 0.78 sq mi (2.03 km^{2})
  - Water: 0.0039 sq mi (0.01 km^{2})
- Elevation: 1,355 ft (413 m)

Population (2020)
  - Total: 603
  - Density: 769.2/sq mi (296.98/km^{2})
- Time zone: UTC-6 (Central (CST))
  - Summer (DST): UTC-5 (CDT)
- ZIP code: 56326
- Area code: 218
- FIPS code: 27-19898
- GNIS feature ID: 2394711
- Website: evansvillemn.com

Evansville is a city in Douglas County, Minnesota, United States. The population was 603 at the 2020 census.

== History ==
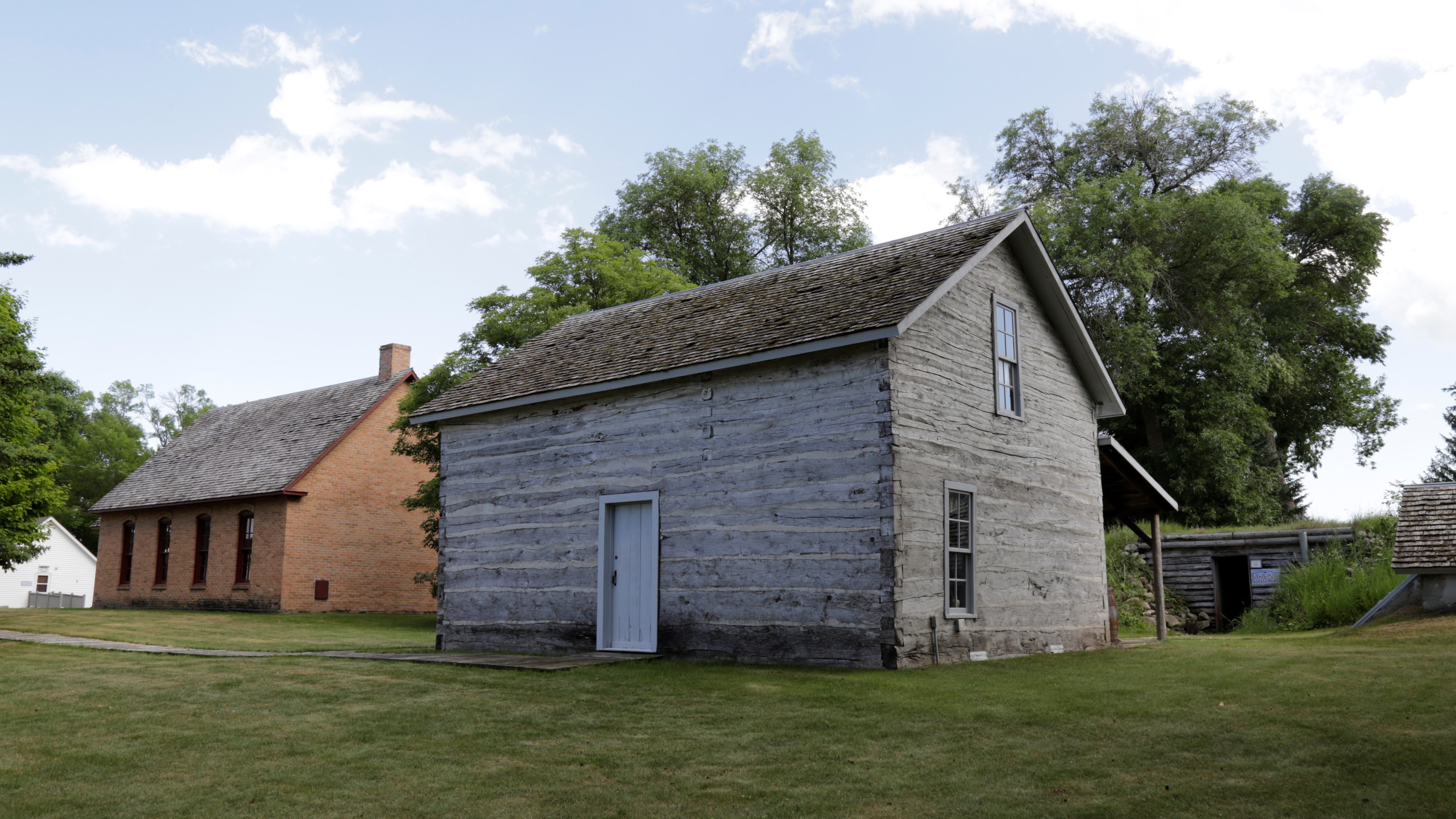
Evansville Historical Foundation, Evansville, Minnesota

Evansville was platted in 1879 when the railroad was extended to that point.

== Geography ==
According to the United States Census Bureau, the city has an area of 0.78 square miles (2.02 km^{2}), all land.

== Demographics ==
Historical population
| Census | Pop. | Note | %± |
|---|---|---|---|
| 1890 | 452 | | — |
| 1900 | 483 | | 6.9% |
| 1910 | 389 | | −19.5% |
| 1920 | 427 | | 9.8% |
| 1930 | 397 | | −7.0% |
| 1940 | 439 | | 10.6% |
| 1950 | 478 | | 8.9% |
| 1960 | 411 | | −14.0% |
| 1970 | 553 | | 34.5% |
| 1980 | 571 | | 3.3% |
| 1990 | 566 | | −0.9% |
| 2000 | 566 | | 0.0% |
| 2010 | 612 | | 8.1% |
| 2020 | 603 | | −1.5% |
U.S. Decennial Census; 2020 Census

=== 2010 census ===
As of the census of 2010, there were 612 people, 272 households, and 154 families living in the city. The population density was 784.6 inhabitants per square mile (302.9/km^{2}). There were 292 housing units at an average density of 374.4 per square mile (144.6/km^{2}). The racial makeup of the city was 97.9% White, 0.2% African American, 0.8% Native American, 0.5% Asian, and 0.7% from two or more races. Hispanic or Latino of any race were 0.8% of the population.

There were 272 households, of which 28.3% had children under the age of 18 living with them, 47.1% were married couples living together, 6.6% had a female householder with no husband present, 2.9% had a male householder with no wife present, and 43.4% were non-families. 39.0% of all households were made up of individuals, and 22.1% had someone living alone who was 65 years of age or older. The average household size was 2.15 and the average family size was 2.88.

The median age in the city was 41.7 years. 23.2% of residents were under the age of 18; 4.5% were between the ages of 18 and 24; 26.6% were from 25 to 44; 20.6% were from 45 to 64; and 25.2% were 65 years of age or older. The gender makeup of the city was 46.1% male and 53.9% female.

=== 2000 census ===
As of the census of 2000, there were 566 people, 249 households, and 127 families living in the city. The population density was 811.8 inhabitants per square mile (313.4/km^{2}). There were 268 housing units at an average density of 384.4 per square mile (148.4/km^{2}). The racial makeup of the city was 99.65% White, 0.18% Pacific Islander, and 0.18% from two or more races.

There were 249 households, out of which 23.7% had children under the age of 18 living with them, 43.4% were married couples living together, 5.6% had a female householder with no husband present, and 48.6% were non-families. 46.2% of all households were made up of individuals, and 27.3% had someone living alone who was 65 years of age or older. The average household size was 2.01 and the average family size was 2.87.

In the city, the population was spread out, with 18.9% under the age of 18, 6.0% from 18 to 24, 22.3% from 25 to 44, 18.9% from 45 to 64, and 33.9% who were 65 years of age or older. The median age was 47 years. For every 100 females, there were 84.4 males. For every 100 females age 18 and over, there were 81.4 males.

The median income for a household in the city was $24,219, and the median income for a family was $36,364. Males had a median income of $32,321 versus $16,563 for females. The per capita income for the city was $17,021. About 7.1% of families and 10.0% of the population were below the poverty line, including 8.9% of those under age 18 and 15.0% of those age 65 or over.

== Economy ==
The only grocery store is open only a few days a week to anyone, but members have access to the store anytime for self-service shopping.
