= Minnesota State Highway 54 =

State highway in Minnesota, United States

Trunk Highway 54
- MN 54 highlighted in red

Route information
- Maintained by MnDOT
- Length: 10.851 mi (17.463 km)
- Existed: 1920–2020

Major junctions
- South end: MN 27 in Roseville Township
- North end: US 59 / MN 55 in Elbow Lake

Location
- Country: United States
- State: Minnesota
- Counties: Grant

Highway system
- Minnesota Trunk Highway System; Interstate; US; State; Legislative; Scenic
| ← US 53 | → MN 55 |

Minnesota State Highway 54 (MN 54) was a 10.851-mile-long (17.463 km) highway in west-central Minnesota, which ran from its intersection with State Highway 27 in Roseville Township of Grant County and continued north to its northern terminus at its intersection with U.S. Highway 59 / State Highway 55 (co-signed) in Elbow Lake. The route has a speed limit of 60 miles per hour (97 km/h) for its entire length.

Highway 54 passed through Roseville Township, Lien Township, Sanford Township, and Elbow Lake.

== Route description ==
State Highway 54 served as a north–south route between the city of Elbow Lake and State Highway 27.

Highway 54, together with Highway 27, served as an arterial route between Herman and the county seat at Elbow Lake.

The route was legally defined as Constitutional Route 54 in the Minnesota Statutes.

== History ==
=== Highway 54 ===
Trunk Highway 54
- Location: Elbow Lake to Herman
- Length: 19 mi (31 km)
- Existed: 1920–1934

State Highway 54 was authorized in 1920 from Elbow Lake to Herman. In 1934, the east-west portion of this route near Herman became part of State Highway 27.

The route was still gravel in 1949. It was fully paved by 1953.

Highway 54 was turned back to Grant County on June 1, 2020 due to low traffic volumes and its status as a major collector, which functions more as a county state-aid highway or county road. The road is now known as CSAH 54. In exchange, Minnesota State Highway 78 was extended south to Erdahl via CSAH 10.

== Major intersections ==
The entire route was in Grant County.

| Location | mi | km | Destinations | Notes |
|---|---|---|---|---|
| Roseville Township | 0.000 | 0.000 | MN 27 – Herman, Hoffman CR 35 south (210th Avenue) | Southern terminus; road continues south as CR 35/210th Avenue |
| Lien Township | 2.021 | 3.252 | CR 35 east, CR 34 west (170th Street) | |
| Lien Township | 4.034 | 6.492 | CR 36 east (190th Street) | |
| Lien Township | 5.040 | 8.111 | CSAH 8 west (200th Street) | Southern end of CSAH 8 concurrency |
| Lien Township | 6.047 | 9.732 | CSAH 8 east (210th Street) | Northern end of CSAH 8 concurrency |
| Lien–Sanford township line | 7.111 | 11.444 | CSAH 12 west (220th Street) | |
| Sanford Township | 8.184 | 13.171 | CR 46 west (230th Street) | |
| Sanford Township | 10.224 | 16.454 | CSAH 25 west (250th Street) – CSAH 1 | |
| Elbow Lake | 10.851 | 17.463 | US 59 / MN 55 | Northern terminus |
1.000 mi = 1.609 km; 1.000 km = 0.621 mi
