= Pomme de Terre =

Pomme de Terre (French for "potato", literally "ground apple") may refer to:

- Pomme de Terre, Minnesota, a ghost town, US
- Pomme de Terre Lake, in Missouri, US
- Pomme de Terre River (Minnesota), US
- Pomme de Terre River (Missouri), US
- Pomme de Terre Township, Grant County, Minnesota, US

== See also ==
- Pomme (disambiguation)
