= Gorton (disambiguation) =

Gorton is an area of the City of Manchester, England.

Gorton may also refer to:

== People ==
- See Gorton (surname)

== Places in England ==
- Gorton, area of the City of Manchester, England
- Gorton North, government ward in the Gorton area
- Gorton South, government ward in the Gorton area
- Manchester Gorton (UK Parliament constituency)
- Gorton railway station, Manchester
- Gorton Monastery. former RC monastery

== Other ==
- Gorton, Pennsylvania, a place in Pennsylvania, United States
- Gorton railway station (West Highland Line), Argyll and Bute council area, Scotland
- Gorton High School, New York, United States
- Gorton Township, Minnesota. United States
- Division of Gorton, a federal electoral division in the state of Victoria, Australia
- Mount Gorton, Antarctica
- Gorton's of Gloucester, seafood market, Gloucester, Massachusetts, United States
- Cretons, a pork-based spread sometimes called gorton
- Gorton (typeface), a monoline typeface family used on engraved signs and electronic equipment
