= Lee Sheppard =

Lee Sheppard may refer to:

- Lee Sheppard (cartoonist), Australian cartoonist and animator
- Lee Sheppard (columnist), American tax commentator and columnist for Tax Notes

== See also ==
- Lee Shepherd, racing driver
