= Paul D. Aasness =

American farmer, businessman, and politician

Paul Dennis Aasness
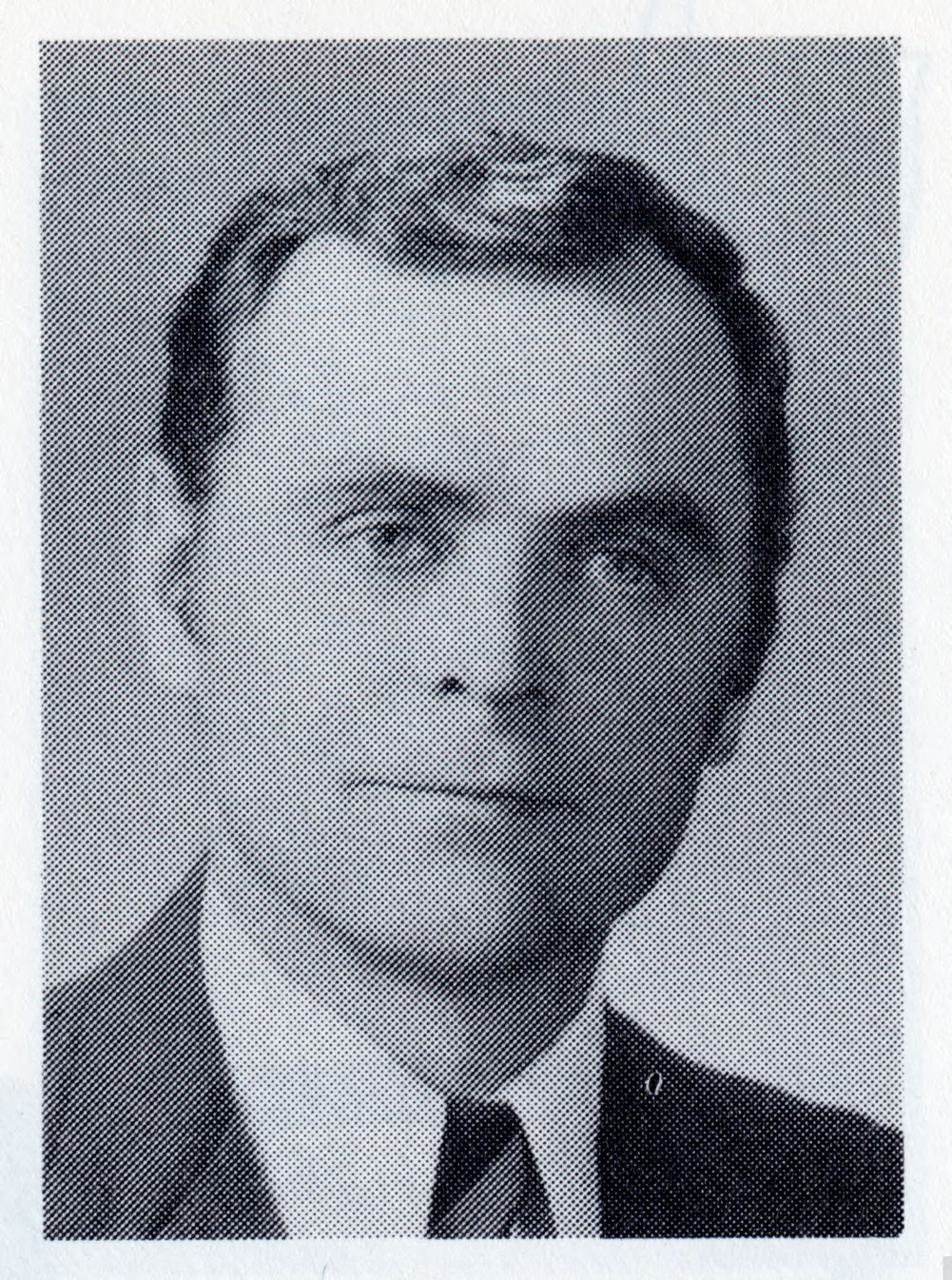
- Aasness in 1982
- Born: December 16, 1939
- Died: November 21, 2017 (aged 77); Fargo, North Dakota, U.S.
- Education: North Dakota State College of Science
- Occupations: Farmer, Businessman, Politician
- Known for: American farmer, businessman, and politician
- Office: Minnesota House of Representatives
- Political party: Republican

Paul Dennis Aasness (December 16, 1939 – November 21, 2017) was an American farmer, businessman, and politician.

Aasness lived on the family farm near Doran, Minnesota. In 1958, Aasness graduated from Breckenridge High School in Breckenridge, Minnesota. He went to the North Dakota State College of Science. Aasness was a grain and livestock farmer in Wendell, Minnesota. He was also involved with the banking business. Aasness served on the North Ottawa Township Board and was a Republican. Aasness served in the Minnesota House of Representatives from 1979 to 1982. In 1995, Aasness and his wife moved to a farm in Orwell Township, Minnesota. Aasness died at Sanford Hospital in Fargo, North Dakota during surgery.
