= Poms =

POMS or Poms may refer to:

- Production and Operations Management is an academic society and a peer-reviewed academic journal covering research on all topics in product and process design, operations, and supply chain management.
- Pom-pons, a hand-held decoration used in cheerleading or a related sport also called "poms" or "pom-pons"
- Poms (slang), slang term for British people
- Profile of mood states, a psychological rating scale used to assess transient, distinct mood states
- Poms (film), a 2019 American comedy film

== See also ==
- Pom (disambiguation)
- Pommes frites, or french fries
- Ten Pound Poms, a colloquial term used in Australia and New Zealand to describe British migrants
