= Lightning Lake (Minnesota) =

Lake in the state of Minnesota, United States

- Location within Minnesota
- Location: Grant County, Minnesota
- Coordinates: 46°4′10″N 96°5′6″W
- Type: lake

Lightning Lake is a lake in Grant County, in the U.S. state of Minnesota.

Lightning Lake probably received its name from an incident when a party of explorers were almost struck by lightning near the lake.

== See also ==
- List of lakes in Minnesota
