= Thors =

Thors may refer to the following:

- Thors, a 2015 comic series featuring multiple versions of Thor (Marvel Comics)
- Thors, Aube, a French commune in the department of Aube
- Thors, Charente-Maritime, a French commune in the department of Charente-Maritime
- Thorsborg, Minnesota, a United States ghost town in the state of Minnesota
- Thors, a character from the manga Vinland Saga who serves as the father to the protagonist Thorfinn
