= Logan Township, Grant County, Minnesota =

Township in Minnesota, United States

Logan Township
- Township
- Location within the state of Minnesota Logan Township (the United States)
- Coordinates: 45°47′46″N 96°10′55″W
- Country: United States
- State: Minnesota
- County: Grant

Area
  - Total: 34.9 sq mi (90.4 km^{2})
  - Land: 34.8 sq mi (90.1 km^{2})
  - Water: 0.12 sq mi (0.3 km^{2})
- Elevation: 1,047 ft (319 m)

Population (2000)
  - Total: 115
  - Density: 3.4/sq mi (1.3/km^{2})
- Time zone: UTC-6 (Central (CST))
  - Summer (DST): UTC-5 (CDT)
- FIPS code: 27-37862
- GNIS feature ID: 0664812

Logan Township is a township in Grant County, Minnesota, United States. The population was 115 at the 2000 census.

Logan Township was organized in 1874, and named for John A. Logan, a U.S. Senator from Illinois.

== Geography ==
According to the United States Census Bureau, the township has a total area of 34.9 square miles (90.4 km^{2}), of which 34.8 square miles (90.1 km^{2}) is land and 0.1 square mile (0.3 km^{2}) (0.34%) is water.

== Demographics ==
As of the census of 2000, there were 115 people, 49 households, and 34 families residing in the township. The population density was 3.3 inhabitants per square mile (1.3/km^{2}). There were 56 housing units at an average density of 1.6 per square mile (0.62/km^{2}). The racial makeup of the township was 100.00% White.

There were 49 households, out of which 24.5% had children under the age of 18 living with them, 59.2% were married couples living together, 8.2% had a female householder with no husband present, and 28.6% were non-families. 26.5% of all households were made up of individuals, and 10.2% had someone living alone who was 65 years of age or older. The average household size was 2.35 and the average family size was 2.77.

In the township the population was spread out, with 21.7% under the age of 18, 8.7% from 18 to 24, 21.7% from 25 to 44, 27.0% from 45 to 64, and 20.9% who were 65 years of age or older. The median age was 41 years. For every 100 females, there were 113.0 males. For every 100 females age 18 and over, there were 109.3 males.

The median income for a household in the township was $27,083, and the median income for a family was $33,125. Males had a median income of $27,188 versus $11,250 for females. The per capita income for the township was $16,284. There were 5.7% of families and 6.7% of the population living below the poverty line, including 9.1% of under eighteens and none of those over 64.
