= Herman U. S. A. =

2001 film by Bill Semans

Herman U.S.A.
- Directed by: Bill Semans
- Written by: Bill Semans
- Produced by: Jeffrey Hohman; Bill Semans; Patrick Wells
- Cinematography: Ross Berryman
- Edited by: Daniel J. Geiger; Michael N. Knue
- Music by: Stephen Graziano
- Distributed by: Two Silks Releasing
- Release date: 2001
- Running time: 89 minutes
- Country: United States
- Language: English

Herman U.S.A. is a 2001 American romantic comedy directed by Bill Semans.

== Synopsis ==
In a small Minnesota town, seventy-eight bachelor farmers advertise for companionship, leading to a response far outstripping expectations.

== Cast ==
- Michael O'Keefe as Dennis
- Kevin Chamberlin as Wayne
- Enid Graham as Dorrie
- Ann Hamilton as Sharon
- Garth Schumacher as Walter
- Wally Dunn as Sigurd
- Anthony Mockus Sr. as Arvid
- Christina Rouner as June
- Marjie Rynearson as Lillian
- Kim Sykes as Kim
- Richard Wharton as Vern
- Mark Benninghoffen as Rick
- Suzanne Warmanen as Nancy
- Tom Price as Harry
- Brian Baumgartner as Roger
- Michael D. Bang as Michael O'Keefe's (Dennis') station wagon driver; long-haired country-boy

== Background ==
Herman U.S.A. was filmed in a real small town in Minnesota called New Germany. The crew painted over the water tower to read "Herman U. S. A." The town of Herman, Minnesota did not have enough hotel space to fit the entire cast members and the crew members.
