= Hereford, Minnesota =

Human settlement in Grant County, Minnesota, United States of America

Coordinates: 46°00′52″N 96°08′31″W

Hereford is an extinct town in Grant County, in the U.S. state of Minnesota.

== History ==
Hereford was platted in 1887 when the railroad was extended to that point. The community was named after the local herds of Hereford cattle. A post office was established at Hereford in 1888, and remained in operation until it was discontinued in 1923. The town of Hereford had disappeared by the 1940s, with the exception of the cemetery which still remains.
