= Mabel Seeley =

American mystery writer

- Born: Mabel Hodnefield; March 25, 1903; Herman, Minnesota
- Died: June 9, 1991 (aged 88)
- Education: University of Minnesota
- Occupation: Author
- Spouses: Kenneth Seeley (m. 1926, divorced); Henry Ross (m. 1954)
- Writing career
- Genre: Mystery
- Notable work: The Chuckling Fingers
- Website: mabelmysteries.com

Mabel Seeley (née Hodnefield; March 25, 1903 – June 9, 1991) was an American mystery writer.

== Early life ==
Seeley was born March 25, 1903, in Herman, Minnesota.

Her family moved to St. Paul in 1920 where she attended Mechanic Arts High School. She graduated summa cum laude from the University of Minnesota. At the university, she found inspiration for her writing career from Mary Ellen Chase, who was then teaching English there.

== Writing career ==
In 1926 she married fellow student Kenneth Seeley and they moved to Chicago, where she wrote advertising copy for a department store. This experience she used as background of the heroine in her first book, The Listening House. The Seeleys returned to Minnesota for medical treatment when Ken contracted tuberculosis, but they later divorced. In the late 1940s she and her son Gregory moved to California.

All of her books with the exception of "Eleven Came Back" were set in Minnesota, and Seeley took pains to capture her Midwestern setting, including visiting a North Shore lake at nighttime to capture an eerie feeling for her book The Crying Sisters.

Though her work is not well known today, Seeley was popular during her lifetime, and was positively reviewed in notable publications like the New York Times, Saturday Review and The New Yorker. St. Paul literary critic James Gray called her "a high priestess in the cult of murder as a fine art." The Minnesota newspaper St. Cloud Times called her "one of the best mystery writers in the United States" in a 1942 article. In 1939, The Saturday Review of Literature named The Crying Sisters the best mystery of the year. The Chuckling Fingers won the Mystery of the Year award in 1941. In 1945 she was an early member of the Mystery Writers of America and served on its first Board of Directors. One of her contemporaries, Fredric Brown, paid a sort of tribute to her in his 1953 novel Madball with a carnival worker using the stage name Maybelle Seeley and saying that she had “seen the name Mabel Seeley on a book and had liked it but had made it even better by changing it to Maybelle.”

Mystery writer Diana Killian, who counts Seeley as an early influence, notes that Seeley's protagonists were noteworthy as strong, independent women decades before modern feminism: "The typical Seeley heroine is smart, frank and strong-willed. [She is] a working middle-class woman: a librarian, a copy-writer, a stenographer."

In 1954, while in the East to promote her last book, The Whistling Shadow, Mabel Seeley met lawyer Henry Ross. They married two years later and settled in New Jersey. After her second marriage, she stopped writing; after her death, Ross told a reporter she had done so to devote more time to her marriage.

== Death ==
Seeley died on June 9, 1991.

== Bibliography ==
- The Listening House (1938)
- The Crying Sisters (1939)
- The Whispering Cup (1940)
- The Chuckling Fingers (1941)
- Eleven Came Back (1943)
- Woman of Property (1947)
- The Beckoning Door (1950) (Note: Briefly reviewed in the February 4, 1950 issue of The New Yorker, p.95.)
- The Stranger Beside Me (1951)
- The Whistling Shadow (also published as The Blonde with the Deadly Past) (1954)

———————

Bibliography notes
