= Stony Brook Township, Grant County, Minnesota =

Township in Minnesota, United States

Stony Brook Township
- Township
- Location within the state of Minnesota Stony Brook Township (the United States)
- Coordinates: 46°3′44″N 96°5′9″W
- Country: United States
- State: Minnesota
- County: Grant

Area
  - Total: 34.7 sq mi (89.8 km^{2})
  - Land: 32.9 sq mi (85.1 km^{2})
  - Water: 1.9 sq mi (4.8 km^{2})
- Elevation: 1,106 ft (337 m)

Population (2000)
  - Total: 164
  - Density: 4.9/sq mi (1.9/km^{2})
- Time zone: UTC-6 (Central (CST))
  - Summer (DST): UTC-5 (CDT)
- FIPS code: 27-62986
- GNIS feature ID: 0665719

Stony Brook Township is a township in Grant County, Minnesota, United States. The population was 164 at the 2000 census.

Stony Brook Township was organized in 1877, and took its name from the Stony Brook creek.

== Geography ==
According to the United States Census Bureau, the township has a total area of 34.7 square miles (89.8 km^{2}), of which 32.8 square miles (85.1 km^{2}) is land and 1.8 square miles (4.8 km^{2}) (5.31%) is water.

== Demographics ==
As of the census of 2000, there were 164 people, 60 households, and 49 families residing in the township. The population density was 5.0 people per square mile (1.9/km^{2}). There were 73 housing units at an average density of 2.2/sq mi (0.9/km^{2}). The racial makeup of the township was 96.34% White, 3.05% from other races, and 0.61% from two or more races. Hispanic or Latino of any race were 3.05% of the population.

There were 60 households, out of which 36.7% had children under the age of 18 living with them, 76.7% were married couples living together, 5.0% had a female householder with no husband present, and 18.3% were non-families. 13.3% of all households were made up of individuals, and 5.0% had someone living alone who was 65 years of age or older. The average household size was 2.73 and the average family size was 3.04.

In the township the population was spread out, with 28.7% under the age of 18, 3.0% from 18 to 24, 26.8% from 25 to 44, 24.4% from 45 to 64, and 17.1% who were 65 years of age or older. The median age was 41 years. For every 100 females, there were 127.8 males. For every 100 females age 18 and over, there were 116.7 males.

The median income for a household in the township was $42,500, and the median income for a family was $41,875. Males had a median income of $26,042 versus $23,750 for females. The per capita income for the township was $23,490. About 4.3% of families and 6.8% of the population were below the poverty line, including 18.0% of those under the age of eighteen and none of those 65 or over.
