= Lee Sheppard (cartoonist) =

Australian cartoonist and animator (born 1974)

- Born: August 22, 1974 (age 51); Paddington, New South Wales, Australia
- Known for: Cartoonist, Animator
- Notable work: Wicked!, Gloria's House, Crocadoo
- Website: LeeSheppard.com

Lee Sheppard (born 22 August 1974) is an Australian cartoonist and animator. He currently resides in Sydney, Australia and is developing and writing projects for animated film & television.

== Personal ==
Sheppard was born in Paddington, New South Wales to Barry Ernest Sheppard and Margaret Crichton-Reid.

== Education ==
Sheppard spent 2 years studying Fine Arts at Paddington Art School under tuition by Stephen Wesley Gorton in 1993, then Classical Advanced Animation studies at Enmore Design Centre in 1995, and later on Screenwriting for Children's Animated Television Series at the Australian Film Television Radio School (AFTRS) in 2007.

== Career ==
Sheppard's early career began while drawing political comics for Fairfax community newspapers in his late teens. He then worked as an animator on numerous animated children's TV series such as Wicked! Gloria's House and Crocadoo. He was also the comic strip artist for political cartoon, Cactus Island, a strip based on the multi-award-winning radio show "How Green was my Cactus". Sheppard used the pseudonym D. Denko instead of his real name in this comic strip. Cactus Island was syndicated through Auspac Media, which was published in regional newspapers across Australia between 1999 and 2006.

In 1994 he was nominated as a member by Jim Russell (The Potts) to join the Australian Cartoonists' Association (ACA). Lee was on the committee for 5 years, where he has held the positions of Secretary, NSW State Vice President and Deputy President. And in 1998 he was again nominated by Jim Russell to the ranks of the National Cartoonists Society in the United States.

Sheppard is also a member of the Australian Film Institute and Australian Writer's Guild.

== Awards ==
In 2003, Sheppard won the Stanley Award's Best Cartoon on the Night, in Ettalong.

== Sources ==
- http://www.cartoonists.org.au/stanleys.htm%5B%5D
- http://www.nma.gov.au/exhibitions/past_exhibitions/behind_the_lines/about_the_artists/
- http://www.cartoonists.org.au/downloads/Inkspot41.pdf%5B%5D
