= Macsville Township, Grant County, Minnesota =

Township in Minnesota, United States

Macsville Township
- Township
- Location within the state of Minnesota Macsville Township (the United States)
- Coordinates: 45°48′15″N 96°3′50″W
- Country: United States
- State: Minnesota
- County: Grant

Area
  - Total: 36.2 sq mi (93.7 km^{2})
  - Land: 32.4 sq mi (83.8 km^{2})
  - Water: 3.8 sq mi (9.9 km^{2})
- Elevation: 1,079 ft (329 m)

Population (2000)
  - Total: 128
  - Density: 3.9/sq mi (1.5/km^{2})
- Time zone: UTC-6 (Central (CST))
  - Summer (DST): UTC-5 (CDT)
- FIPS code: 27-39194
- GNIS feature ID: 0664866

Macsville Township is a township in Grant County, Minnesota, United States. The population was 128 at the 2000 census.

Macsville Township was organized in 1878, and named for Francis McNabb, a county official.

== Geography ==
According to the United States Census Bureau, the township has a total area of 36.2 square miles (93.7 km^{2}), of which 32.3 square miles (83.8 km^{2}) is land and 3.8 square miles (9.9 km^{2}) (10.56%) is water.

== Demographics ==
As of the census of 2000, there were 128 people, 52 households, and 34 families residing in the township. The population density was 4.0 inhabitants per square mile (1.5/km^{2}). There were 59 housing units at an average density of 1.8 per square mile (0.69/km^{2}). The racial makeup of the township was 100.00% White.

There were 52 households, out of which 28.8% had children under the age of 18 living with them, 63.5% were married couples living together, 1.9% had a female householder with no husband present, and 32.7% were non-families. 30.8% of all households were made up of individuals, and 7.7% had someone living alone who was 65 years of age or older. The average household size was 2.46 and the average family size was 3.11.

In the township the population was spread out, with 24.2% under the age of 18, 4.7% from 18 to 24, 26.6% from 25 to 44, 28.1% from 45 to 64, and 16.4% who were 65 years of age or older. The median age was 41 years. For every 100 females, there were 116.9 males. For every 100 females age 18 and over, there were 115.6 males.

The median income for a household in the township was $30,833, and the median income for a family was $55,938. Males had a median income of $26,250 versus $20,000 for females. The per capita income for the township was $16,781. There were no families and 1.5% of the population living below the poverty line, including no under eighteens and 13.3% of those over 64.

== See also ==
- Macville Township, Minnesota
