= Michael Doran (politician) =

American politician

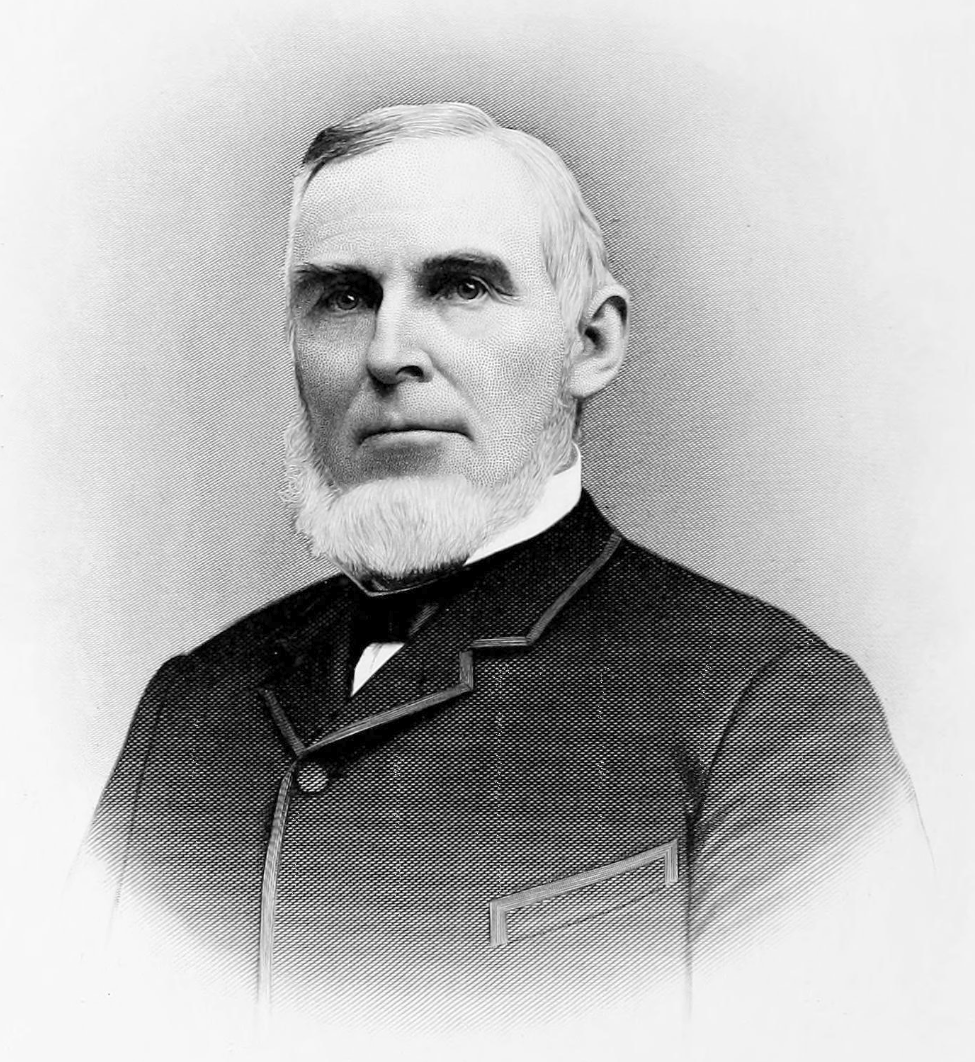
- Born: November 1, 1827; County Meath, Ireland
- Died: February 20, 1915 (aged 87); St. Paul, Minnesota
- Occupations: Politician businessman
- Spouses: Helen Brady (m. 1855; died 1862) Catherine O'Grady (m. 1865)
- Children: 13

Signature
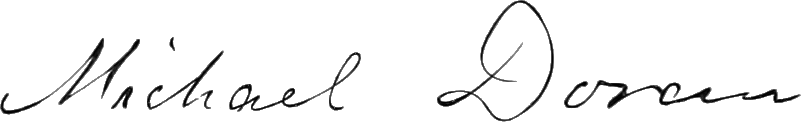

Michael Doran (November 1, 1827 – February 20, 1915) was a Minnesota politician and businessman. He was a party boss of the Minnesota Democratic Party.

== Biography ==
=== Early life ===
Michael Doran was born in County Meath, Ireland on November 1, 1827. He emigrated to New York in 1850, then moved to Norwalk, Ohio, the following year. In 1855, he married Helen Brady of Norwalk. He took out a land claim in Kilkenny, Minnesota, (Le Sueur County) in 1856 and established a farm there the following year. His first wife died in 1862, leaving four young children.

=== Political Rise ===
Doran was elected county treasurer of Le Sueur County on the Democratic ticket in 1862, serving four successive terms. In 1865, he married his second wife, Catherine O'Grady. Nine children were born of this marriage.

In 1870, Doran was elected to the Minnesota State Senate from Le Sueur County and served several terms. In 1870 he moved from Kilkenny township to Le Sueur, Minnesota, and entered the banking business. In 1875, he went into the milling business at Le Sueur. Late in the 1870s, he entered into partnership in a banking and brokerage business in St. Paul, Minnesota.

=== Democratic State Convention of 1886 ===
In the lead-up the 1886 Democratic State Convention, A.A. Ames was the only major Democratic candidate. However, to secure the nomination, Ames had to appease Doran and another party boss, Patrick H. Kelly. Doran and Kelly instructed to Ames to let them reorganize the party to their wishes. However, Kelly and another major figure in the Democratic party, Ignatius Donnelly, betrayed Doran and agreed to support Ames in exchange for Doran being removed from party leadership.

The convention itself (led by Donnelly) was disastrous, and despite Ames still becoming the nominee, Donnelly's influence in the party collapsed, and Doran was re-instated as party Chairman.

=== Later career ===
He lived in Le Sueur until 1888, when he sold out his local interests, and moved to St. Paul, where he continued with his banking concerns.

Doran was chairman of the Minnesota Democratic State Central Committee on numerous other occasions, and was chairman of the National Democratic Committee from 1888 to 1896, when he resigned over differences with his party on bimetallism. He was a close political and personal friend of Grover Cleveland, who gave him the principal credit for procuring his third presidential nomination in 1892. He continued as a leading conservative within the party, notably opposing John Lind. He chose not to organize any opposition to Lind internally. In 1900, Doran stated "Let him get the nomination. He will be slaughtered at the polls."

Doran died in St. Paul on February 20, 1915. He is the namesake of the city of Doran, Minnesota.
