= Pomme de Terre, Minnesota =

Ghost town in United States of America

Coordinates: 46.06473°N 95.95689°W

Pomme de Terre is an extinct town in section 24 of Pomme de Terre Township in Grant County, Minnesota, United States.

== History ==
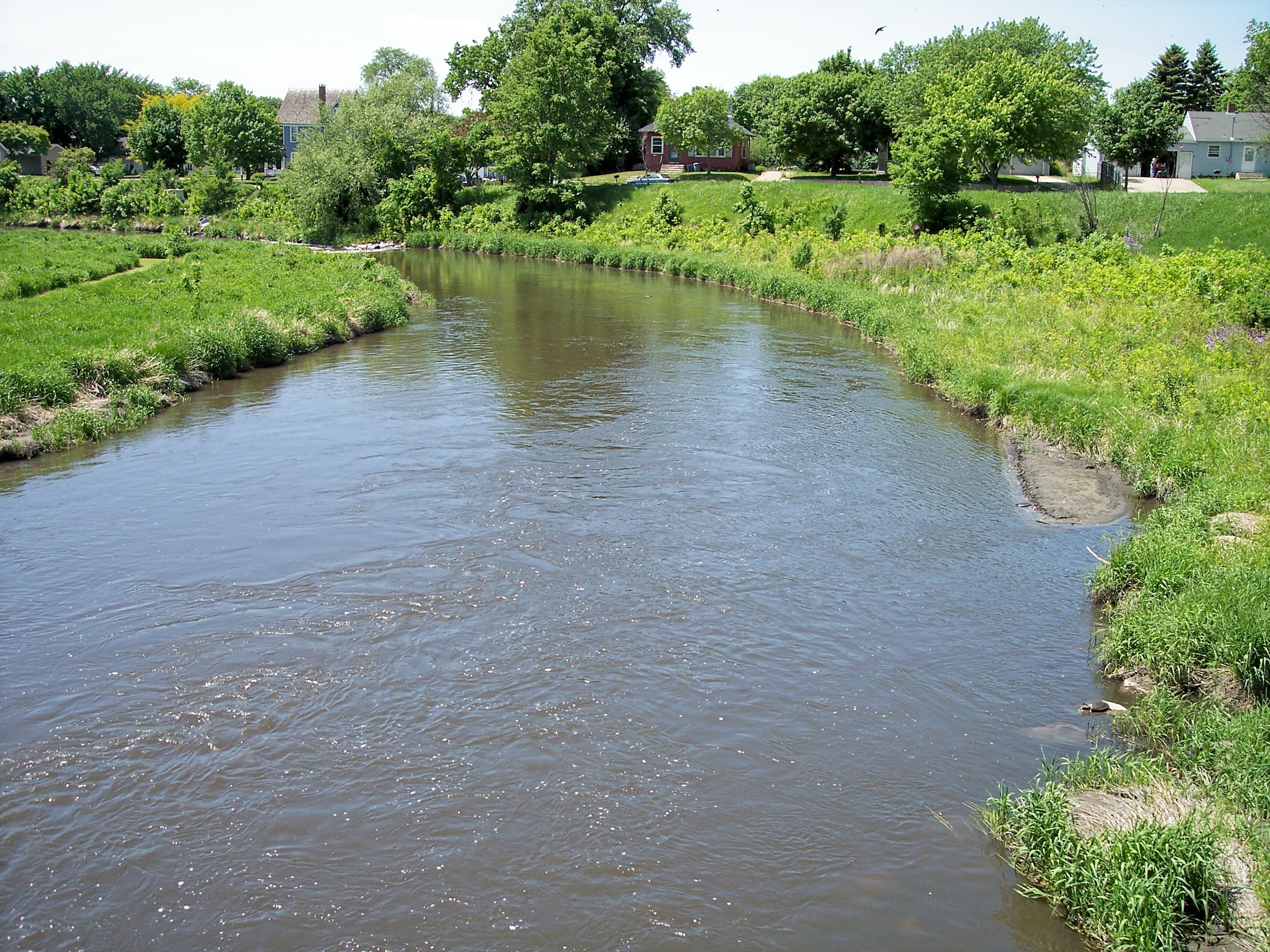
The town was located next to the Pomme de Terre River.

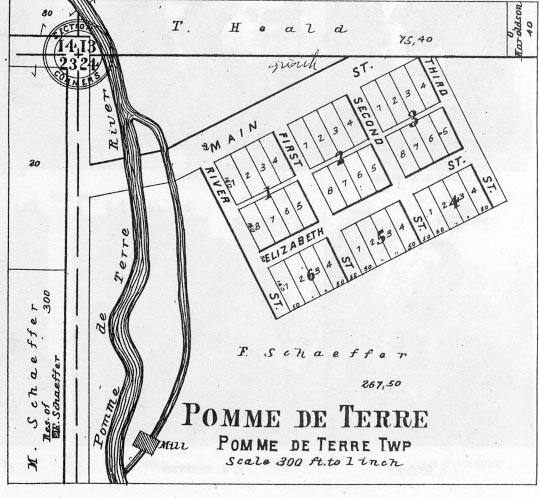
platmap

Pomme de Terre was the first village settled in Grant County in 1868. It was settled by Timothy Heald, Joseph Pennock and Frank Smith and platted in 1874 by Timothy Heald in section 24 of Pomme de Terre Township. The site was chosen for its location of where the stagecoach road from St. Cloud, Minnesota to Fort Abercrombie (on the Red River) crossed the Pomme de Terre River.

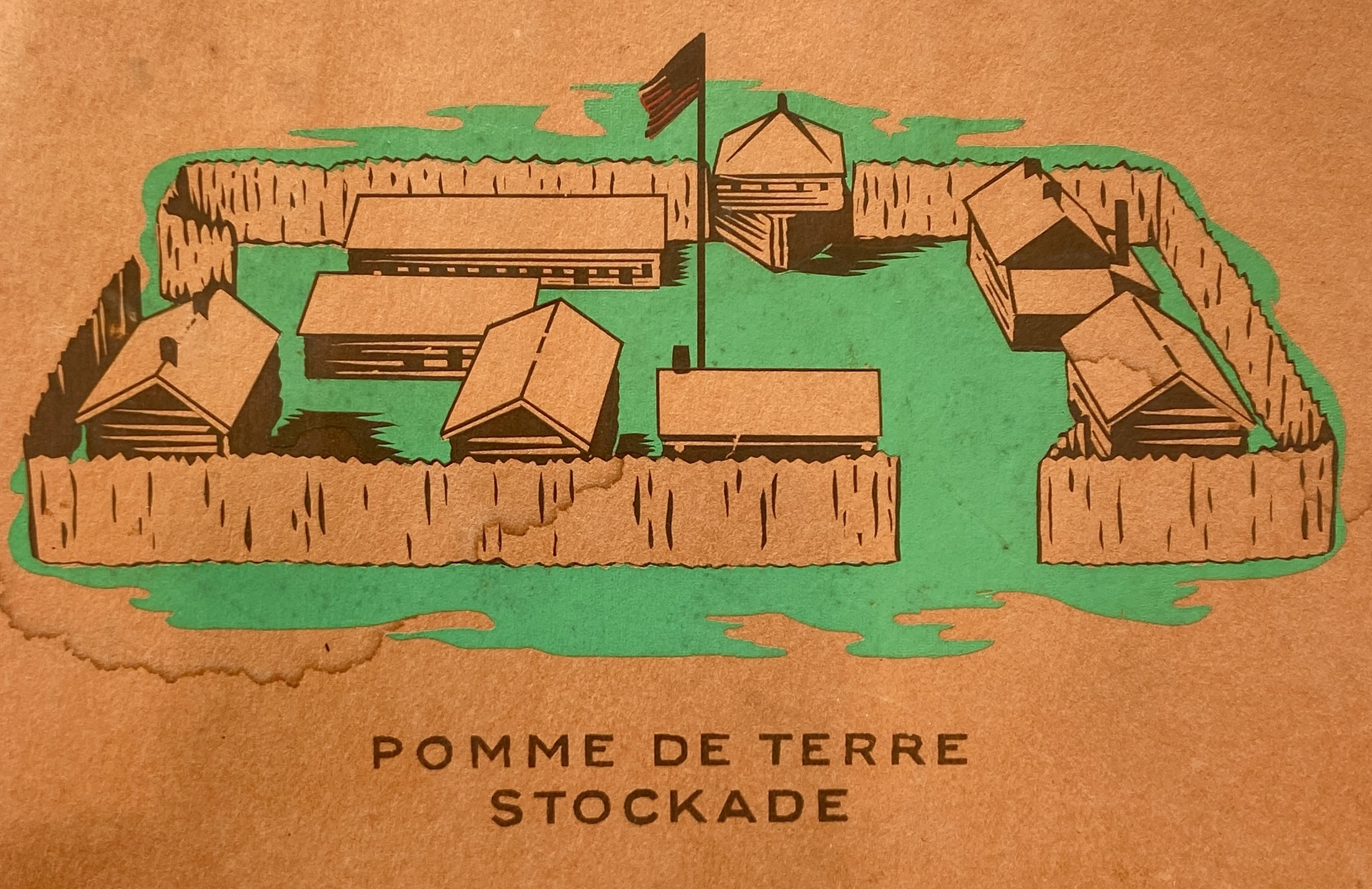
Illustration of the Fort Pomme de Terre Stockade. From the publication, "Inventory of County Archives of Minnesota" Grant County.

In 1871, N.Q. Puntches moved his general merchandise stock from the old stockade (Fort Pomme de Terre, located about 1 1/2 miles to the east) to the village. Frank Williams and August Schaeffer built a grist mill in 1873. The grist mill burned down in August 1887. At the time the mill was shipping out three carloads of flour each week.

A post office existed during the years 1868-79, and 1880 to 1902. At its height, Pomme de Terre had two stores, two blacksmith shops, a grist mill, elevator, hotel and saloon.

In April 1873, the first county commissioners for Grant County, Henry F. Sanford, K.N.O. Melby and S.S. Frogner, met in N.Q. Puntches store for the purpose of choosing the county seat. A motion to locate the county seat at Pomme de Terre failed. It was instead located at what is now Elbow Lake. The development of Herman, the growth of Elbow Lake as the county seat, and the failure of the railroad to come through Pomme de Terre (going instead to the north through Ashby) led to the eventual demise of the village.

== Etymology ==
The name Pomme de Terre is French and is translated as "apple of the earth," which usually refers to the potato. In this case, however, it refers to the prairie turnip (Psoralea esculenta), a potato-like root vegetable which was commonly eaten by the Sioux.
