= Wayne Olhoft =

American politician (born 1951)

Wayne Olholt (born August 1, 1951) is an American former politician and farmer.

Olhoft was born in Wheaton, Minnesota. He lived in Herman, Minnesota and graduated from Herman High School in 1969. Olhoft was a farmer and served in the Minnesota National Guard. He received his bachelor's degree from Metropolitan State University in business and his master's degree in business administration from the University of Minnesota. Olhoft served in the Minnesota Senate from 1973 to 1982 and was a Democrat. He then served as the Minnesota Deputy Secretary of State in 2005.
