= Dorothy Houston Jacobson =

American political scientist and educator (1907–1985)

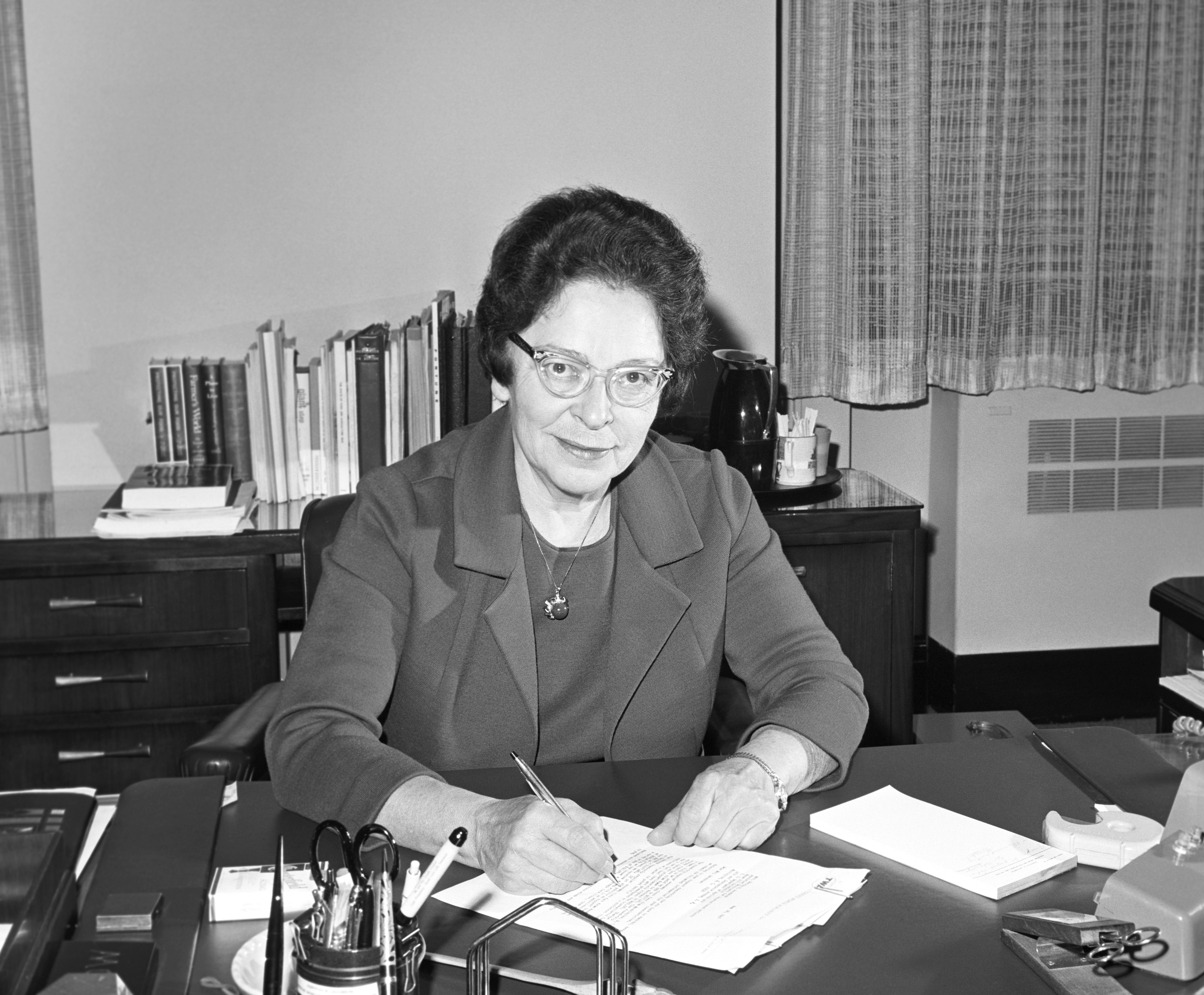
- Jacobson at her desk at the U.S. Department of Agriculture in 1967
- Born: Dorothy Houston; November 13, 1907; Herman, Minnesota, U.S.
- Died: July 13, 1985 (aged 77); Minneapolis, Minnesota, US
- Occupations: Educator, political scientist, government official
- Known for: Assistant Secretary for International Affairs at the United States Department of Agriculture (1964–1969)
- Spouse: George W. Jacobson (m. 1937)

Dorothy Houston Jacobson (November 13, 1907 – July 13, 1985) was an American political scientist and educator. She was a co-founder and chair of the Minnesota Democratic–Farmer–Labor Party, and served as Assistant Secretary for International Affairs at the United States Department of Agriculture from 1964 to 1969, during the Johnson administration.

== Early life ==
Houston was born in Herman, Minnesota. She trained as a teacher at St. Cloud State Teachers College, and earned a bachelor's degree and a master's degree at the University of Minnesota. She wrote her master's thesis on "China and the League of Nations" (1928).

== Career ==
Houston taught school as a young woman, and worked as a curriculum consultant for the Minnesota Department of Education. From 1936 to 1937, she was program secretary for the National League of Women Voters. She was a co-director of the Minneapolis League of Women Voters in 1938. She and her husband were among the founders of an early cooperative health plan, Group Health Mutual. She wrote Our Interests as Consumers (1941), a social studies text. Also in 1941, she taught at the Minneapolis Labor School. She was a political science professor at Macalester College from 1945 to 1955. One of her students at Macalester was politician Walter Mondale.

From 1950 to 1954, Jacobson was chair of the Minnesota Democratic–Farmer–Labor Party, which she also helped to found. In 1955 she became chief assistant to governor Orville Freeman. She was Assistant Secretary of Agriculture for International Affairs during the Johnson administration, from 1964 to 1969. She made the dress she wore for her swearing-in ceremony, from beige and gold silk. She was the highest ranking woman in the USDA, and represented the United States at international meetings involving food and agriculture. She also recommended a strategic reserve of agricultural products, including "food, feeds, and fibers". She spoke on the demographic transition to an audience of military specialists in 1966, warning of the risk of "mass famine" and the need for international agricultural development.

In the 1970s, Jacobson was executive director of Population Crisis Committee, director of the Freedom from Hunger Foundation, and director of the Greenbelt Cooperative. She retired to Richfield, Minnesota in 1982.

== Personal life ==
Dorothy Houston married George W. Jacobson, a consultant for USAID, in 1937.

== Death ==
Dorothy Houston died in Minneapolis in 1985 at the age of 77.

Party political offices
Preceded by Ione Hunt	Democratic-Farmer-Labor Party Chairwoman; 1950-1956	Succeeded by Anne Vetter
