= Pomme =

Pomme or pommes may refer to:

- Pomme (singer), a French singer
- Pomme, a green (vert) roundel in heraldry

== Other languages ==
=== French ===
- Apple
- Pomme de terre, Potato
- Pomme frites, French fries
- Pommes fondant, Fondant potatoes

== See also ==
- "Pomme, pomme, pomme", the Luxembourgish entry in the 1971 Eurovision Song Contest
- La Pomme Marseille, a former name for cycling team Marseille 13-KTM
- Pommie, Australian slang word for British
- Pom (disambiguation)
- Pomme de Terre (disambiguation)
