= Gorton (surname) =

Gorton is a surname which translates in English as "dirty farm", and may refer to:

- Andy Gorton, English footballer
- Assheton Gorton, English production-designer
- Bea Gorton (1946–2020), American college basketball coach
- Bettina Gorton
- Cynthia Roberts Gorton (1826–1894; pseudonym, "Ida Glenwood"), American poet, author
- Don Gorton, Massachusetts attorney
- Frank Gorton, American sports coach
- Gary Gorton, American economist
- George Gorton, Californian political-consultant
- Jeff Gorton, American ice-hockey executive
- Jeffrey Gorton, American murderer
- John Gorton, Australian Prime Minister and Senator
- John Gorton (writer) (died 1835), English compiler
- Lewis G. Gorton, American educationalist
- Mark Gorton, American CEO
- Nathaniel M. Gorton (born 1938), American judge
- Neville Gorton, Bishop of Coventry
- Samuel Gorton, religious leader in colonial New England
- Slade Gorton (born 1832), co-founder of Gorton's of Gloucester
- Slade Gorton (1928–2020), American politician
- Stephen Wesley Gorton, Australian artist

== See also ==
- Gorton
