= Doran, Minnesota =

City in Minnesota, United States

- City
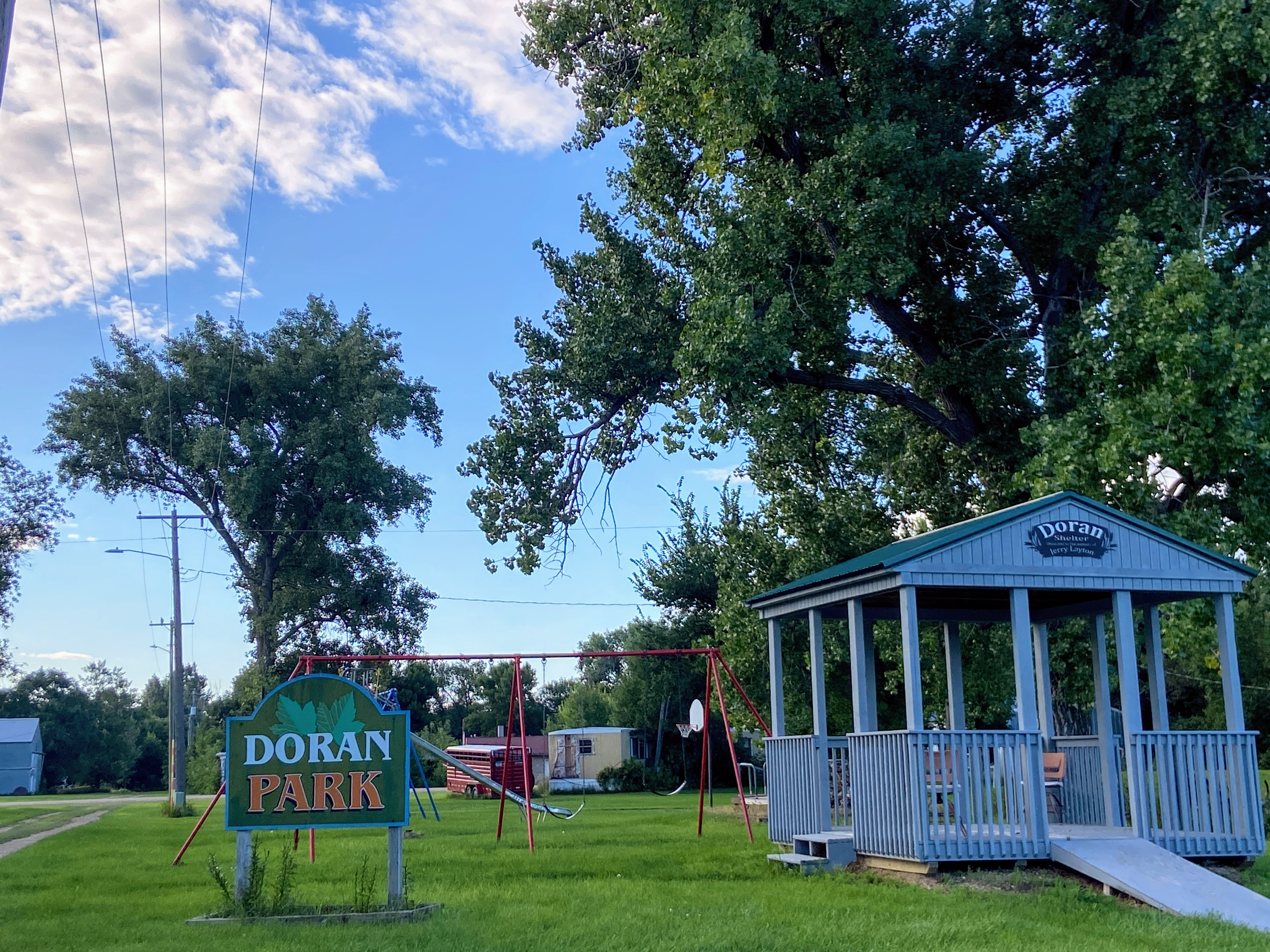
- Doran Park

- Location of Doran, Minnesota
- Coordinates: 46°11′07″N 96°29′08″W
- Country: United States
- State: Minnesota
- County: Wilkin
- Incorporated: July 8, 1907

Government
  - Mayor: Bruce Dell

Area
  - Total: 0.207 sq mi (0.537 km^{2})
  - Land: 0.207 sq mi (0.537 km^{2})
  - Water: 0 sq mi (0.000 km^{2})
- Elevation: 974 ft (297 m)

Population (2020)
  - Total: 36
  - Estimate (2022): 34
  - Density: 173.7/sq mi (67.06/km^{2})
- Time zone: UTC–6 (Central (CST))
  - Summer (DST): UTC–5 (CDT)
- ZIP Code: 56522
- Area code: 218
- FIPS code: 27-16156
- GNIS feature ID: 2394549
- Sales tax: 6.875%

Doran is a city in Wilkin County, Minnesota, United States. The population was 36 at the 2020 census. It is part of the Wahpeton, ND-MN Micropolitan Statistical Area.

== History ==
A post office called Doran was established in 1892, and remained in operation until 1989. The city was named for Michael Doran, a state legislator.

== Notable person ==
Paul D. Aasness (1939-2017), farmer, businessman and politician, grew up on the family farm near Doran.

== Geography ==
According to the United States Census Bureau, the city has a total area of 0.207 square miles (0.54 km^{2}), all land.

Doran is located at the junction of U.S. Route 75 and Minnesota State Highway 9.

== Demographics ==
Historical population
Census	Pop.	Note	%±
1910	93		—
1920	98		5.4%
1930	137		39.8%
1940	128		−6.6%
1950	126		−1.6%
1960	136		7.9%
1970	101		−25.7%
1980	77		−23.8%
1990	78		1.3%
2000	59		−24.4%
2010	55		−6.8%
2020	36		−34.5%
2022 (est.)	34		−5.6%
U.S. Decennial Census; 2020 Census

=== 2010 census ===
As of the 2010 census, there were 55 people, 21 households and 14 families living in the city. The population density was 261.9 inhabitants per square mile (101.1/km^{2}). There were 27 housing units at an average density of 128.6 per square mile (49.7/km^{2}). The racial makeup was 100.0% White.

There were 21 households, of which 42.9% had children under the age of 18 living with them, 42.9% were married couples living together, 14.3% had a female householder with no husband present, 9.5% had a male householder with no wife present, and 33.3% were non-families. 23.8% of all households were made up of individuals, and 9.5% had someone living alone who was 65 years of age or older. The average household size was 2.62 and the average family size was 3.21.

The median age was 34.5 years. 29.1% of residents were under the age of 18; 5.5% were between the ages of 18 and 24; 23.6% were from 25 to 44; 36.4% were from 45 to 64; and 5.5% were 65 years of age or older. The gender makeup of the city was 49.1% male and 50.9% female.

=== 2000 census ===
As of the 2000 census, there were 59 people, 24 households and 15 families living in the city. The population density was 284.1 inhabitants per square mile (109.7/km^{2}). There were 31 housing units at an average density of 149.3 per square mile (57.6/km^{2}). The racial makeup was 91.53% White, 1.69% African American, 1.69% Native American, and 5.08% from two or more races.

There were 24 households, of which 33.3% had children under the age of 18 living with them, 54.2% were married couples living together, 4.2% had a female householder with no husband present, and 37.5% were non-families. 29.2% of all households were made up of individuals, and 12.5% had someone living alone who was 65 years of age or older. The average household size was 2.46 and the average family size was 3.07.

18.6% of the population were under the age of 18, 11.9% from 18 to 24, 33.9% from 25 to 44, 22.0% from 45 to 64, and 13.6% who were 65 years of age or older. The median age was 40 years. For every 100 females, there were 96.7 males. For every 100 females age 18 and over, there were 108.7 males.

The median household income was $26,250 and the median family income was $56,250. Males had a median income of $30,833 and females $23,750. The per capita income was $15,959. There were 12.5% of families and 15.5% of the population living below the poverty line, including no under eighteens and none of those over 64.

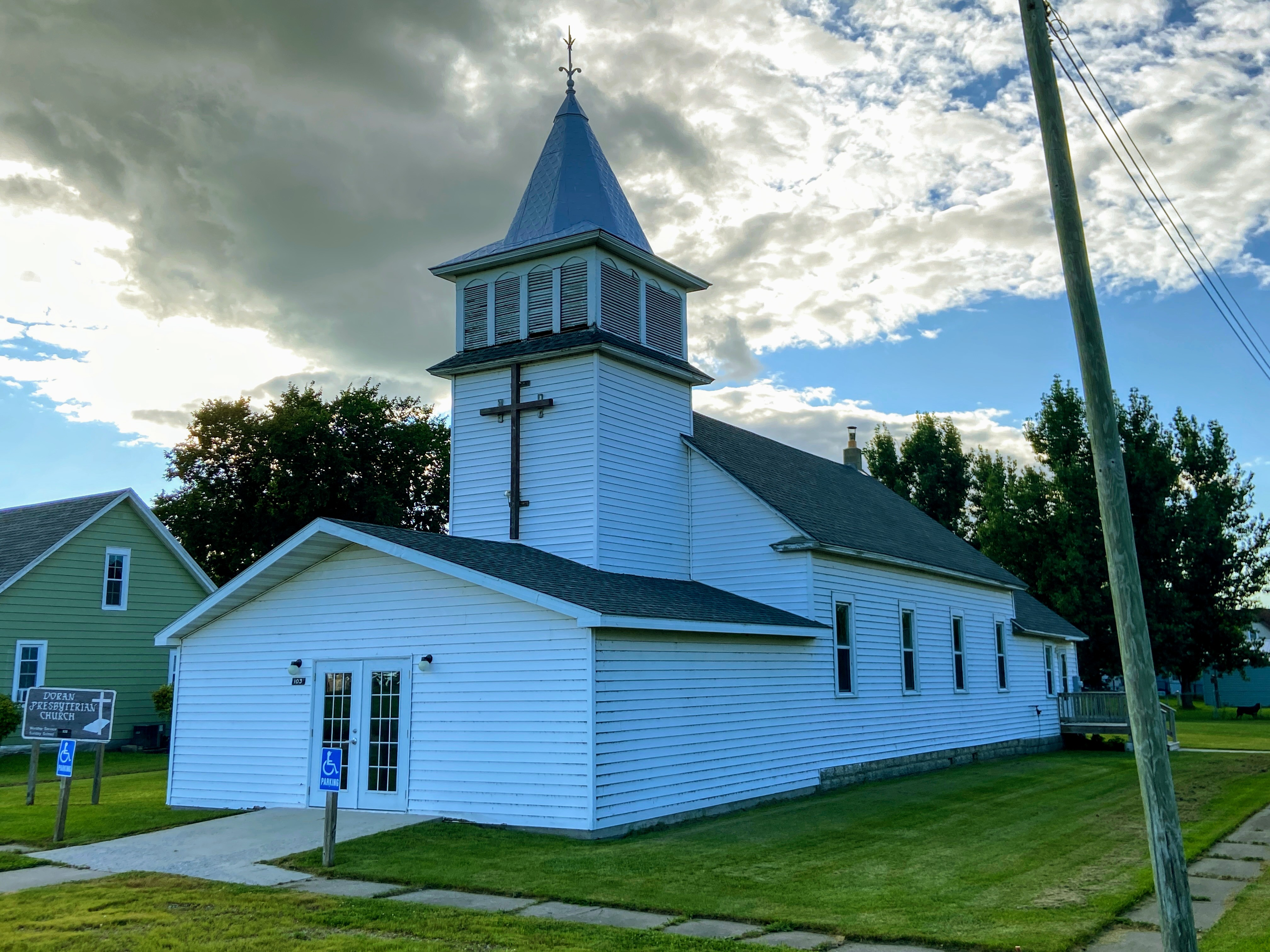

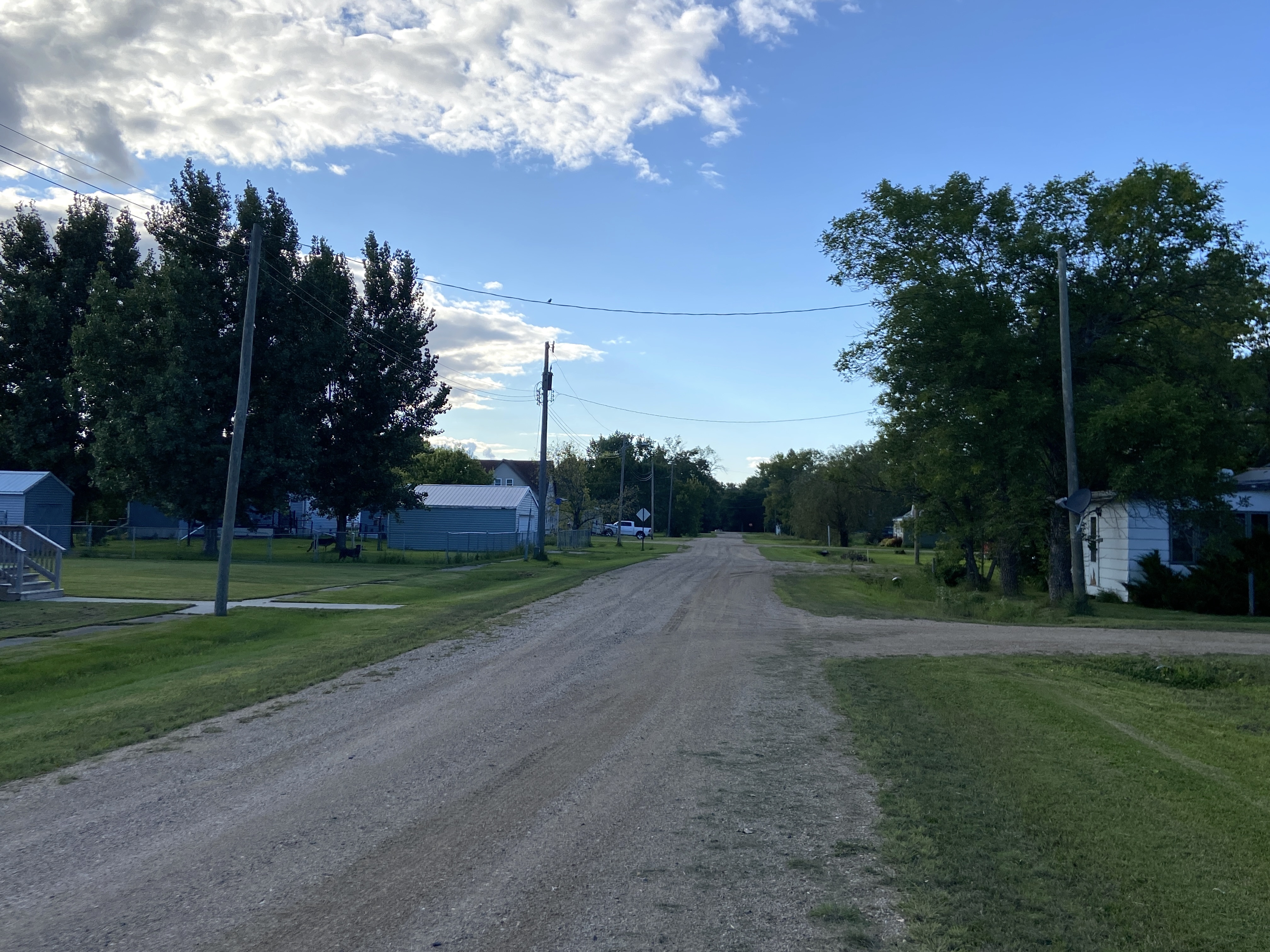

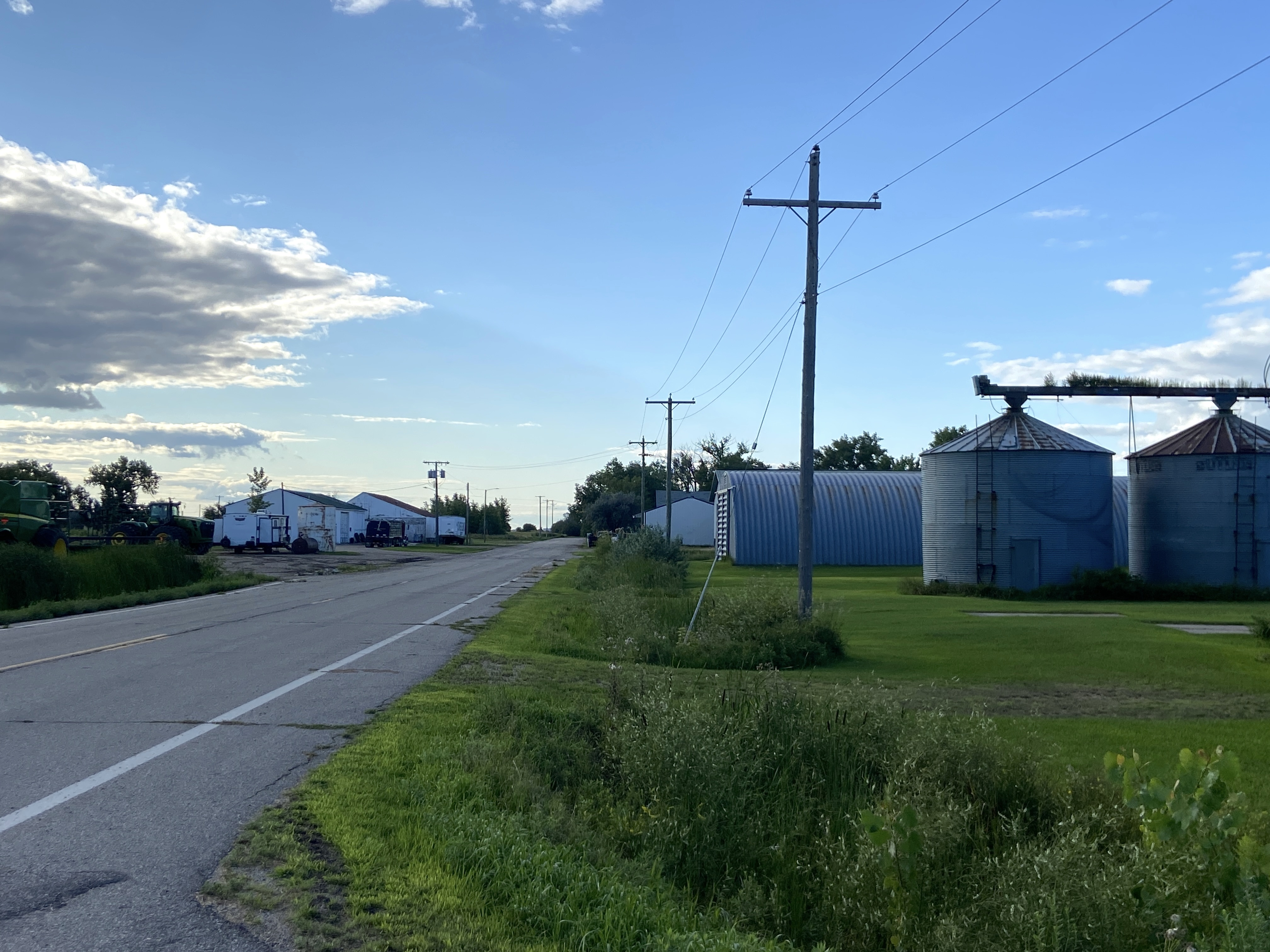

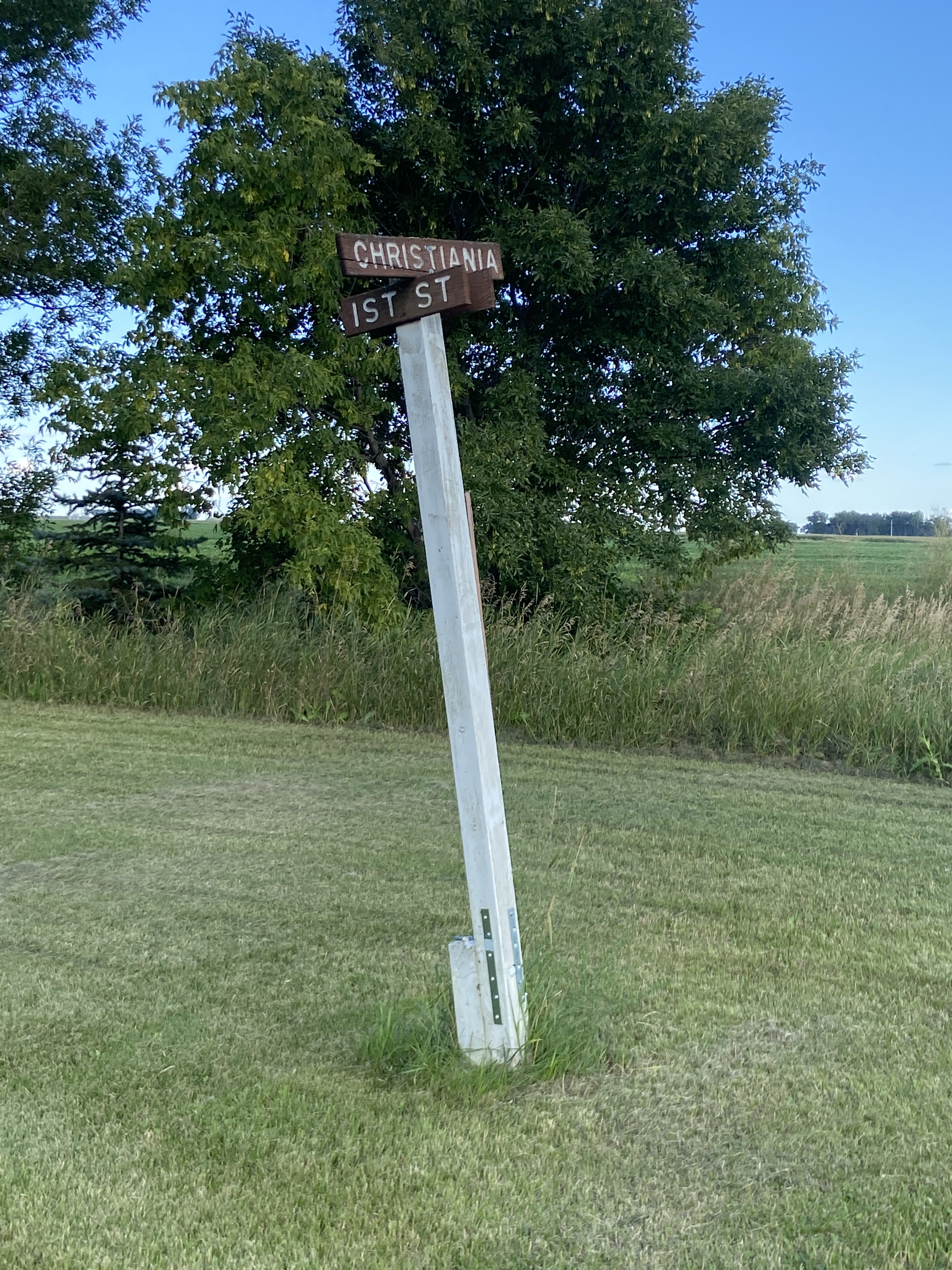
