= Land Township, Grant County, Minnesota =

Township in Minnesota, United States

Land Township
- Township
- Location within the state of Minnesota Land Township (the United States)
- Coordinates: 45°47′46″N 95°48′39″W
- Country: United States
- State: Minnesota
- County: Grant

Area
  - Total: 33.9 sq mi (87.7 km^{2})
  - Land: 33.6 sq mi (86.9 km^{2})
  - Water: 0.31 sq mi (0.8 km^{2})
- Elevation: 1,250 ft (381 m)

Population (2000)
  - Total: 244
  - Density: 7.3/sq mi (2.8/km^{2})
- Time zone: UTC-6 (Central (CST))
  - Summer (DST): UTC-5 (CDT)
- FIPS code: 27-35396
- GNIS feature ID: 0664719

Land Township is a township in Grant County, Minnesota, United States. The population was 244 at the 2000 census.

Land Township was organized in 1878.

== Geography ==
According to the United States Census Bureau, the township has a total area of 33.9 square miles (88 km^{2}), of which 33.6 square miles (87 km^{2}) is land and 0.3 square miles (0.78 km^{2}) (0.92%) is water.

== Demographics ==
As of the census of 2000, there were 244 people, 84 households, and 66 families residing in the township. The population density was 7.3 inhabitants per square mile (2.8/km^{2}). There were 93 housing units at an average density of 2.8 per square mile (1.1/km^{2}). The racial makeup of the township was 100.00% White.

There were 84 households, out of which 41.7% had children under the age of 18 living with them, 71.4% were married couples living together, 1.2% had a female householder with no husband present, and 21.4% were non-families. 19.0% of all households were made up of individuals, and 8.3% had someone living alone who was 65 years of age or older. The average household size was 2.90 and the average family size was 3.36.

In the township the population was spread out, with 29.1% under the age of 18, 9.4% from 18 to 24, 26.2% from 25 to 44, 19.7% from 45 to 64, and 15.6% who were 65 years of age or older. The median age was 38 years. For every 100 females, there were 112.2 males. For every 100 females age 18 and over, there were 121.8 males.

The median income for a household in the township was $43,750, and the median income for a family was $51,250. Males had a median income of $28,906 versus $20,893 for females. The per capita income for the township was $14,788. About 3.2% of families and 7.6% of the population were below the poverty line, including 7.8% of those under the age of eighteen and 13.8% of those 65 or over.
