= Wendell, Minnesota =

City in Minnesota, United States

Wendell
- City
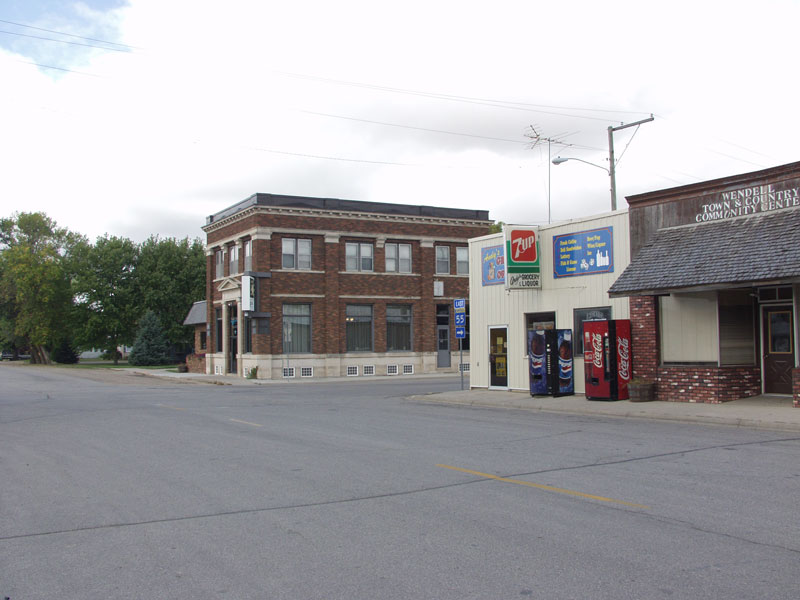
- Downtown Wendell

- Location of Wendell, Minnesota
- Coordinates: 46°2′3″N 96°5′58″W
- Country: United States
- State: Minnesota
- County: Grant

Area
  - Total: 0.99 sq mi (2.57 km^{2})
  - Land: 0.99 sq mi (2.57 km^{2})
  - Water: 0 sq mi (0.00 km^{2})
- Elevation: 1,145 ft (349 m)

Population (2020)
  - Total: 166
  - Density: 167/sq mi (64.5/km^{2})
- Time zone: UTC-6 (Central (CST))
  - Summer (DST): UTC-5 (CDT)
- ZIP code: 56590
- Area code: 218
- FIPS code: 27-69142
- GNIS feature ID: 0653909
- Website: https://cityofwendell.com/

Wendell is a city in Grant County, Minnesota, United States. The population was 166 at the 2020 census.

== History ==
Wendell was platted in 1889 when the railroad was extended to that point. A post office has been in operation at Wendell since 1887.

== Geography ==
According to the United States Census Bureau, the city has an area of 1.05 square miles (2.72 km^{2}), all land.

Minnesota State Highway 55 serves as a main route in the community.

== Demographics ==
Historical population
Census	Pop.	Note	%±
1910	175		—
1920	270		54.3%
1930	260		−3.7%
1940	273		5.0%
1950	284		4.0%
1960	253		−10.9%
1970	247		−2.4%
1980	216		−12.6%
1990	159		−26.4%
2000	177		11.3%
2010	167		−5.6%
2020	166		−0.6%
U.S. Decennial Census

=== 2010 census ===
As of the census of 2010, there were 167 people, 76 households, and 52 families living in the city. The population density was 159.0 inhabitants per square mile (61.4/km^{2}). There were 87 housing units at an average density of 82.9 per square mile (32.0/km^{2}). The racial makeup of the city was 100.0% White. Hispanic or Latino of any race were 0.6% of the population.

There were 76 households, of which 22.4% had children under the age of 18 living with them, 53.9% were married couples living together, 9.2% had a female householder with no husband present, 5.3% had a male householder with no wife present, and 31.6% were non-families. 28.9% of all households were made up of individuals, and 14.4% had someone living alone who was 65 years of age or older. The average household size was 2.20 and the average family size was 2.58.

The median age in the city was 50.2 years. 15% of residents were under the age of 18; 11.4% were between the ages of 18 and 24; 18% were from 25 to 44; 28.2% were from 45 to 64; and 27.5% were 65 years of age or older. The gender makeup of the city was 52.7% male and 47.3% female.

=== 2000 census ===
As of the census of 2000, there were 177 people, 77 households, and 50 families living in the city. The population density was 168.3 inhabitants per square mile (65.0/km^{2}). There were 84 housing units at an average density of 79.9 per square mile (30.8/km^{2}). The racial makeup of the city was 100.00% White.

There were 77 households, out of which 27.3% had children under the age of 18 living with them, 51.9% were married couples living together, 7.8% had a female householder with no husband present, and 33.8% were non-families. 28.6% of all households were made up of individuals, and 15.6% had someone living alone who was 65 years of age or older. The average household size was 2.30 and the average family size was 2.82.

In the city, the population was spread out, with 22.6% under the age of 18, 8.5% from 18 to 24, 25.4% from 25 to 44, 19.2% from 45 to 64, and 24.3% who were 65 years of age or older. The median age was 42 years. For every 100 females, there were 92.4 males. For every 100 females age 18 and over, there were 93.0 males.

The median income for a household in the city was $35,625, and the median income for a family was $39,375. Males had a median income of $30,938 versus $18,750 for females. The per capita income for the city was $16,413. None of the families and 2.6% of the population were living below the poverty line, including no under eighteens and 8.7% of those over 64.

== Religion ==
Trinity Lutheran Church in Wendell belongs to the Northwestern Minnesota Synod of the Evangelical Lutheran Church in America. Catholics in Wendell belong to St. Olaf parish in Elbow Lake, Saint Cloud diocese.
