= Herman, Minnesota =

City in Minnesota, United States

Herman
- City
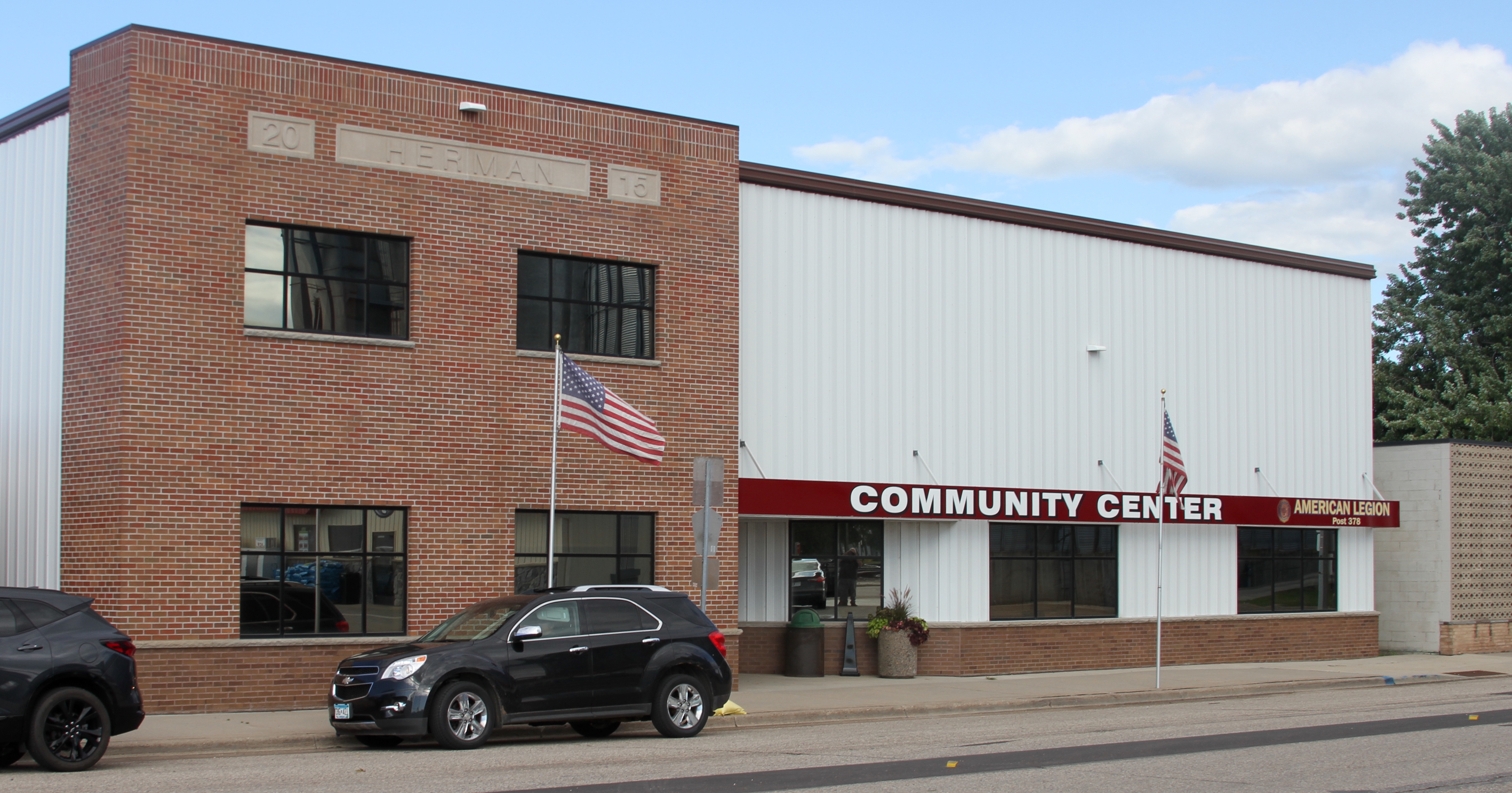
- Community Center

- Location of Herman, Minnesota
- Coordinates: 45°48′34″N 96°8′35″W
- Country: United States
- State: Minnesota
- County: Grant

Area
  - Total: 1.11 sq mi (2.87 km^{2})
  - Land: 1.11 sq mi (2.87 km^{2})
  - Water: 0 sq mi (0.00 km^{2})
- Elevation: 1,073 ft (327 m)

Population (2020)
  - Total: 384
  - Density: 346.2/sq mi (133.67/km^{2})
- Time zone: UTC-6 (Central (CST))
  - Summer (DST): UTC-5 (CDT)
- ZIP code: 56248
- Area code: 320
- FIPS code: 27-28646
- GNIS feature ID: 0644902

Herman is a city in Grant County, Minnesota, United States. The population was 384 at the 2020 census. It lends it name to Herman Beach which is the former shoreline of the prehistoric glacial Lake Agassiz; the feature delineates the edge of this ancient lake for hundreds of miles through Minnesota and North Dakota.

== History ==
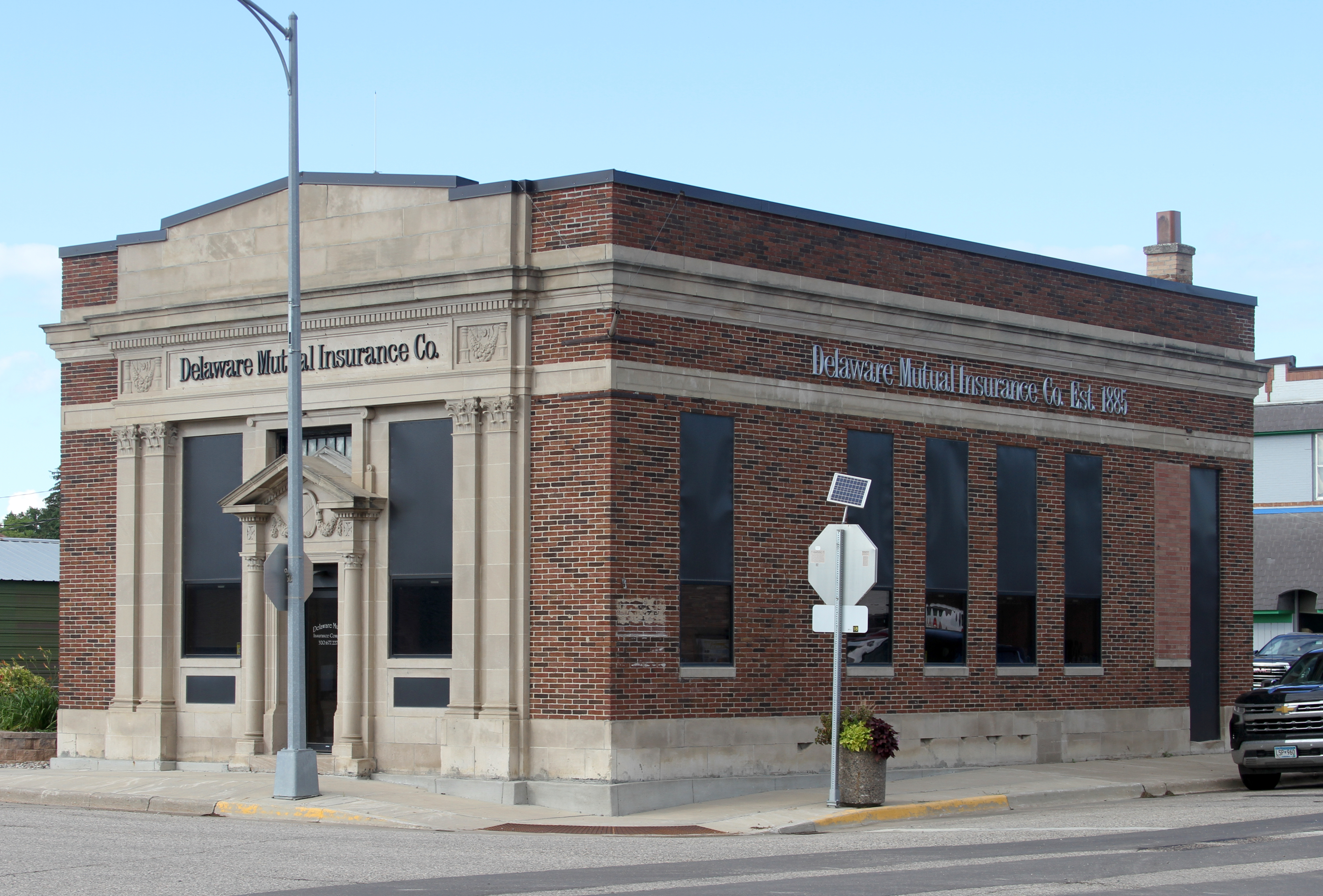
Herman, Minnesota

Herman was platted in 1875, and named for Herman Trott, a railroad official. A post office has been in operation at Herman since 1872.

Herman is known for a 1994 campaign inviting women to meet its 78 bachelors. The story, dubbed "bachelormania", drew worldwide recognition and was adapted into the film Herman U. S. A.

== Geography ==
According to the United States Census Bureau, the city has a total area of 1.07 square miles (2.77 km^{2}), all land.

Minnesota state highways 9 and 27 are two of the main routes in the community.

== Demographics ==
Historical population
Census	Pop.	Note	%±
1880	184		—
1890	322		75.0%
1900	550		70.8%
1910	604		9.8%
1920	630		4.3%
1930	518		−17.8%
1940	703		35.7%
1950	752		7.0%
1960	764		1.6%
1970	619		−19.0%
1980	600		−3.1%
1990	485		−19.2%
2000	452		−6.8%
2010	437		−3.3%
2020	384		−12.1%
U.S. Decennial Census

=== 2010 census ===
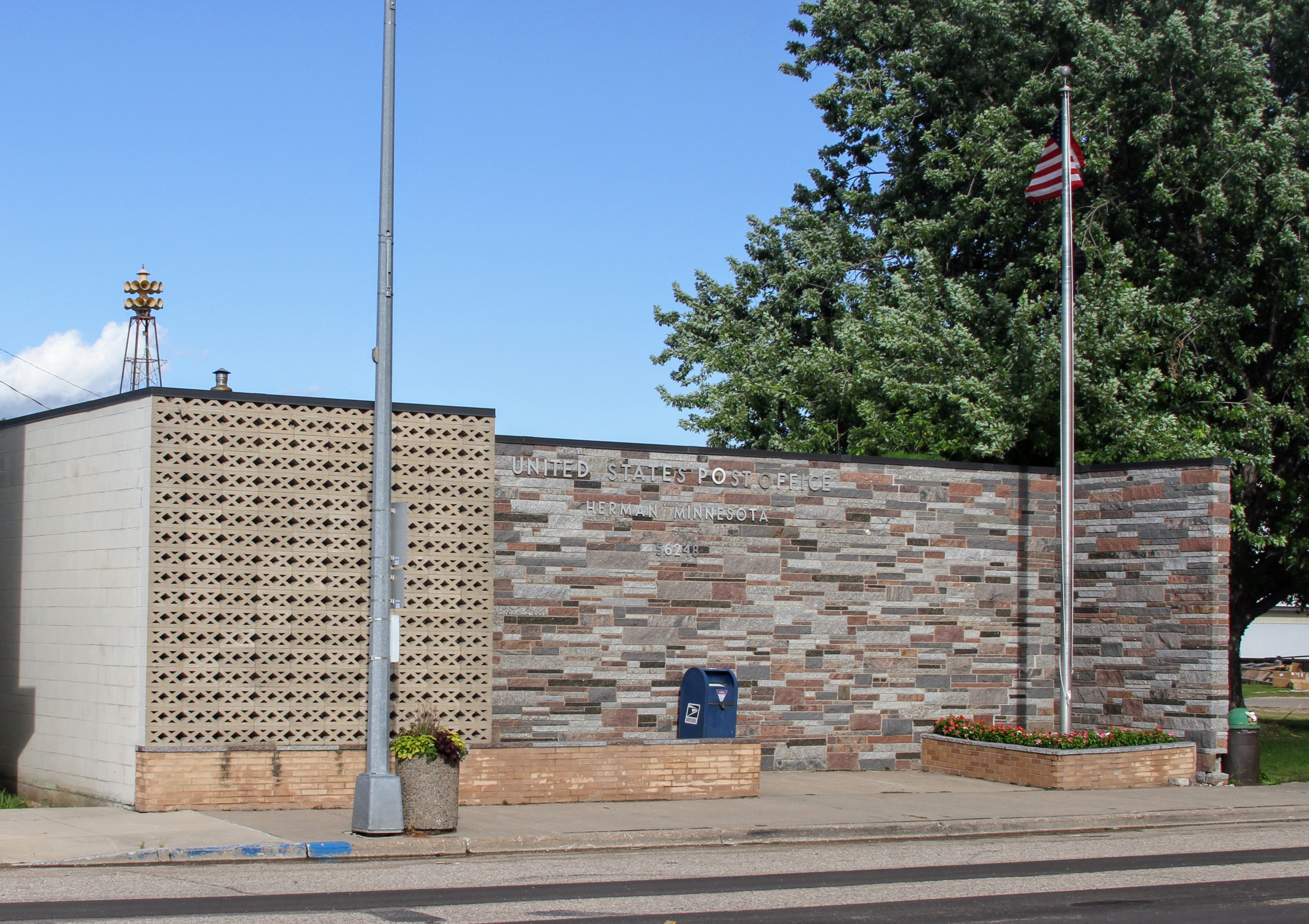
US Post Office, Herman, Minnesota

As of the census of 2010, there were 437 people, 216 households, and 114 families living in the city. The population density was 408.4 inhabitants per square mile (157.7/km^{2}). There were 254 housing units at an average density of 237.4 per square mile (91.7/km^{2}). The racial makeup of the city was 98.4% White, 0.5% African American, 0.2% Asian, and 0.9% from two or more races. Hispanic or Latino of any race were 0.5% of the population.

There were 216 households, of which 20.8% had children under the age of 18 living with them, 44.4% were married couples living together, 6.0% had a female householder with no husband present, 2.3% had a male householder with no wife present, and 47.2% were non-families. 43.1% of all households were made up of individuals, and 23.6% had someone living alone who was 65 years of age or older. The average household size was 2.02 and the average family size was 2.81.

The median age in the city was 48.4 years. 21.7% of residents were under the age of 18; 5.4% were between the ages of 18 and 24; 18% were from 25 to 44; 30.3% were from 45 to 64; and 24.5% were 65 years of age or older. The gender makeup of the city was 46.5% male and 53.5% female.

=== 2000 census ===
As of the census of 2000, there were 452 people, 203 households, and 127 families living in the city. The population density was 437.2 inhabitants per square mile (168.8/km^{2}). There were 237 housing units at an average density of 229.3 per square mile (88.5/km^{2}). The racial makeup of the city was 98.23% White, 0.88% Native American, 0.44% Asian, 0.44% from other races. Hispanic or Latino of any race were 0.66% of the population.

There were 203 households, out of which 27.6% had children under the age of 18 living with them, 48.3% were married couples living together, 8.9% had a female householder with no husband present, and 37.4% were non-families. 35.0% of all households were made up of individuals, and 20.7% had someone living alone who was 65 years of age or older. The average household size was 2.21 and the average family size was 2.82.

In the city, the population was spread out, with 23.5% under the age of 18, 7.3% from 18 to 24, 22.6% from 25 to 44, 22.3% from 45 to 64, and 24.3% who were 65 years of age or older. The median age was 43 years. For every 100 females, there were 89.1 males. For every 100 females age 18 and over, there were 95.5 males.

The median income for a household in the city was $31,429, and the median income for a family was $45,833. Males had a median income of $29,375 versus $17,813 for females. The per capita income for the city was $17,475. About 3.8% of families and 8.6% of the population were below the poverty line, including 9.7% of those under age 18 and 8.9% of those age 65 or over.

== Community ==
Herman is the home to the Grant County Fair. It was the home of the annual Herman Iron Pour, where individuals could learn how to mold and cast iron art.

== Notable people ==
- Theodore H. Barrett (1834–1900), American military officer
- Sophronius S. Landt (1842–1926), Wisconsin State Assemblyman, lived in Herman; Landt was the manager of a creamery.
- Assistant Secretary of Agriculture Dorothy Houston Jacobson, was born in Herman in 1907.
- Wayne Olhoft, Minnesota state senator, lived in Herman.
- Mystery writer Mabel Seeley was born in Herman in 1903.
