= Gorton Township, Grant County, Minnesota =

Township in Minnesota, United States

Gorton Township
- Township
- Location within the state of Minnesota Gorton Township (the United States)
- Coordinates: 45°53′21″N 96°12′12″W
- Country: United States
- State: Minnesota
- County: Grant

Area
  - Total: 34.6 sq mi (89.7 km^{2})
  - Land: 34.6 sq mi (89.7 km^{2})
  - Water: 0 sq mi (0.0 km^{2})
- Elevation: 1,033 ft (315 m)

Population (2000)
  - Total: 64
  - Density: 1.8/sq mi (0.7/km^{2})
- Time zone: UTC-6 (Central (CST))
  - Summer (DST): UTC-5 (CDT)
- FIPS code: 27-24650
- GNIS feature ID: 0664301

Gorton Township is a township in Grant County, Minnesota, United States. The population was 64 at the 2000 census.

Gorton Township was organized in 1879.

== Geography ==
According to the United States Census Bureau, the township has a total area of 34.7 square miles (90 km^{2}), all land.

== Demographics ==
As of the census of 2000, there were 64 people, 27 households, and 20 families residing in the township. The population density was 1.8 inhabitants per square mile (0.69/km^{2}). There were 33 housing units at an average density of 1.0 per square mile (0.39/km^{2}). The racial makeup of the township was 98.44% White and 1.56% Asian. Hispanic or Latino of any race were 1.56% of the population.

There were 27 households, out of which 25.9% had children under the age of 18 living with them, 66.7% were married couples living together, 7.4% had a female householder with no husband present, and 25.9% were non-families. 22.2% of all households were made up of individuals, and 11.1% had someone living alone who was 65 years of age or older. The average household size was 2.37 and the average family size was 2.80.

In the township the population was spread out, with 23.4% under the age of 18, 6.3% from 18 to 24, 23.4% from 25 to 44, 32.8% from 45 to 64, and 14.1% who were 65 years of age or older. The median age was 44 years. For every 100 females, there were 93.9 males. For every 100 females age 18 and over, there were 113.0 males.

The median income for a household in the township was $43,000, and the median income for a family was $43,000. Males had a median income of $17,083 versus $26,250 for females. The per capita income for the township was $19,357. There were 12.5% of families and 19.0% of the population living below the poverty line, including 50.0% of under eighteens and 21.4% of those over 64.
