= Pom =

Pom or POM may refer to:

== Arts and entertainment ==
- Pom (comics) (1919–2014), a Belgian comic strip writer and artist
- Baby Pom, a fictional character in the British television programme Fimbles
- Pom, a character in the video game Them's Fightin' Herds

== Organizations ==
- Pepco Holdings (stock symbol)
- POM Wonderful, a company and brand of pomegranate juice
- Jacksons International Airport or Port Moresby Airport (IATA code)
- Presidio of Monterey, California, a US Army installation
- Working People's Party (Moldova) (Partidului Oamenilor Muncii), a political party in Moldova

== Science and technology ==
- Pomeranian dog, a breed of dog
- Princeton Ocean Model, a model for ocean circulation
- Prescription-only medicine, a medicine that requires a prescription
- Particulate organic matter
- Posterior nucleus, of the thalamus; see Barrel cortex
- Pom-pom, a type or model of machine gun

=== Chemistry ===
- Pivaloyloxymethyl, a functional group in organic chemistry
- Polyoxometalate, a type of inorganic compound used as catalysts
- Polyoxymethylene, a common plastic polymer

=== Computing ===
- Parallax occlusion mapping, a computer graphics method to add 3D complexity to textures
- Pattern-oriented modeling, a technique to validate agent-based models
- Project Object Model, the central construct of the Apache Maven build management system
- Probabilistic Ontology Model, a method for ontology learning used in KAON

== Other uses ==
- Pom (dish), a taro like root based oven dish native to Suriname
- Pom (slang), a slang term for a British person (see Ten-pound Pom)
- Pom language
- Production and Operations Management, a peer-reviewed academic journal
- Pom-pom or pom, a decorative ball
- Pom Klementieff (born 1986), French actress
- Patrouilleur Outre-mer, a type of high-sea patrol vessel

== See also ==
- Pome, a type of fruit
- Pomme (disambiguation)
- Phom (disambiguation)
