= Thorsborg, Minnesota =

- Former settlement
- Location within Minnesota Location within the United States
- Coordinates: 45°58′40″N 95°54′14″W
- Country: United States
- State: Minnesota
- County: Grant
- Elevation: 1,217 ft (371 m)
- Time zone: UTC-6 (Central (CST))
  - Summer (DST): UTC-5 (CDT)
- GNIS feature ID: 2111083

Thorsborg is an extinct town in Grant County, Minnesota, United States.
