= Lien Township, Grant County, Minnesota =

Township in Minnesota, United States

Lien Township
- Township
- Location within the state of Minnesota Lien Township (the United States)
- Coordinates: 45°54′17″N 95°55′26″W
- Country: United States
- State: Minnesota
- County: Grant

Area
  - Total: 34.4 sq mi (89.0 km^{2})
  - Land: 32.2 sq mi (83.3 km^{2})
  - Water: 2.2 sq mi (5.7 km^{2})
- Elevation: 1,150 ft (350 m)

Population (2000)
  - Total: 117
  - Density: 3.6/sq mi (1.4/km^{2})
- Time zone: UTC-6 (Central (CST))
  - Summer (DST): UTC-5 (CDT)
- FIPS code: 27-36998
- GNIS feature ID: 0664779

Lien Township is a township in Grant County, Minnesota, United States. The population was 117 at the 2000 census.

Lien Township was organized in 1874, and named for Ole E. Lien, an early Norwegian settler.

== Geography ==
According to the United States Census Bureau, the township has a total area of 34.3 square miles (89.0 km^{2}), of which 32.2 square miles (83.3 km^{2}) is land and 2.2 square miles (5.7 km^{2}) (6.40%) is water.

== Demographics ==
As of the census of 2000, there were 117 people, 45 households, and 35 families residing in the township. The population density was 3.6 inhabitants per square mile (1.4/km^{2}). There were 66 housing units at an average density of 2.1 per square mile (0.81/km^{2}). The racial makeup of the township was 100.00% White.

There were 45 households, out of which 31.1% had children under the age of 18 living with them, 73.3% were married couples living together, and 22.2% were non-families. 20.0% of all households were made up of individuals, and 8.9% had someone living alone who was 65 years of age or older. The average household size was 2.60 and the average family size was 3.03.

In the township the population was spread out, with 24.8% under the age of 18, 5.1% from 18 to 24, 18.8% from 25 to 44, 35.9% from 45 to 64, and 15.4% who were 65 years of age or older. The median age was 45 years. For every 100 females, there were 120.8 males. For every 100 females age 18 and over, there were 104.7 males.

The median income for a household in the township was $38,750, and the median income for a family was $41,875. Males had a median income of $20,750 versus $26,250 for females. The per capita income for the township was $17,580. There were 16.3% of families and 14.6% of the population living below the poverty line, including 4.5% of under eighteens and 12.5% of those over 64.
