= North Ottawa Township, Grant County, Minnesota =

Township in Minnesota, United States

North Ottawa Township
- Township
- Location within the state of Minnesota North Ottawa Township (the United States)
- Coordinates: 45°58′15″N 96°12′42″W
- Country: United States
- State: Minnesota
- County: Grant

Area
  - Total: 35.8 sq mi (92.6 km^{2})
  - Land: 35.8 sq mi (92.6 km^{2})
  - Water: 0 sq mi (0.0 km^{2})
- Elevation: 1,027 ft (313 m)

Population (2000)
  - Total: 69
  - Density: 1.8/sq mi (0.7/km^{2})
- Time zone: UTC-6 (Central (CST))
  - Summer (DST): UTC-5 (CDT)
- FIPS code: 27-47140
- GNIS feature ID: 0665165

North Ottawa Township is a township in Grant County, Minnesota, United States. The population was 69 at the 2000 census.

== History ==
North Ottawa Township was organized in 1882, and named after Ottawa, Illinois, the former home of an early settler.

== Geography ==
According to the United States Census Bureau, the township has a total area of 35.8 square miles (92.6 km^{2}), all land.

== Demographics ==
As of the census of 2000, there were 69 people, 27 households, and 21 families residing in the township. The population density was 1.9 people per square mile (0.7/km^{2}). There were 28 housing units at an average density of 0.8/sq mi (0.3/km^{2}). The racial makeup of the township was 98.55% White, and 1.45% from two or more races.

There were 27 households, out of which 29.6% had children under the age of 18 living with them, 70.4% were married couples living together, 3.7% had a female householder with no husband present, and 22.2% were non-families. 14.8% of all households were made up of individuals, and 11.1% had someone living alone who was 65 years of age or older. The average household size was 2.56 and the average family size was 2.81.

In the township the population was spread out, with 26.1% under the age of 18, 10.1% from 18 to 24, 23.2% from 25 to 44, 24.6% from 45 to 64, and 15.9% who were 65 years of age or older. The median age was 42 years. For every 100 females, there were 91.7 males. For every 100 females age 18 and over, there were 96.2 males.

The median income for a household in the township was $36,875, and the median income for a family was $35,625. Males had a median income of $0 versus $41,250 for females. The per capita income for the township was $19,451. There were 21.7% of families and 18.9% of the population living below the poverty line, including 13.0% of under eighteens and none of those over 64.
