= Roseville Township, Grant County, Minnesota =

Township in Minnesota, United States

Roseville Township
- Township
- Location within the state of Minnesota Roseville Township (the United States)
- Coordinates: 45°47′54″N 95°57′17″W
- Country: United States
- State: Minnesota
- County: Grant

Area
  - Total: 35.9 sq mi (93.1 km^{2})
  - Land: 35.3 sq mi (91.3 km^{2})
  - Water: 0.69 sq mi (1.8 km^{2})
- Elevation: 1,180 ft (360 m)

Population (2000)
  - Total: 154
  - Density: 4.4/sq mi (1.7/km^{2})
- Time zone: UTC-6 (Central (CST))
  - Summer (DST): UTC-5 (CDT)
- FIPS code: 27-55816
- GNIS feature ID: 0665468

Roseville Township is a township in Grant County, Minnesota, United States. The population was 154 at the 2000 census.

Roseville Township was organized in 1878, and named for the wild roses which grew there when the first settlers came.

== Geography ==
According to the United States Census Bureau, the township has a total area of 35.9 square miles (93.1 km^{2}), of which 35.2 square miles (91.3 km^{2}) is land and 0.7 square mile (1.8 km^{2}) (1.89%) is water.

== Demographics ==
As of the census of 2000, there were 154 people, 52 households, and 43 families residing in the township. The population density was 4.4 people per square mile (1.7/km^{2}). There were 56 housing units at an average density of 1.6/sq mi (0.6/km^{2}). The racial makeup of the township was 96.75% White, 1.30% Asian and 1.95% from two or more races.

There were 52 households, out of which 40.4% had children under the age of 18 living with them, 76.9% were married couples living together, 1.9% had a female householder with no husband present, and 15.4% were non-families. 15.4% of all households were made up of individuals, and 5.8% had someone living alone who was 65 years of age or older. The average household size was 2.96 and the average family size was 3.32.

In the township the population was spread out, with 32.5% under the age of 18, 4.5% from 18 to 24, 25.3% from 25 to 44, 27.9% from 45 to 64, and 9.7% who were 65 years of age or older. The median age was 37 years. For every 100 females, there were 102.6 males. For every 100 females age 18 and over, there were 108.0 males.

The median income for a household in the township was $42,679, and the median income for a family was $44,375. Males had a median income of $23,750 versus $17,188 for females. The per capita income for the township was $17,117. About 8.7% of families and 9.7% of the population were below the poverty line, including 11.1% of those under the age of eighteen and none of those 65 or over.
