= Sanford Township, Grant County, Minnesota =

Township in Minnesota, United States

Sanford Township
- Township
- Location within the state of Minnesota Sanford Township (the United States)
- Coordinates: 45°58′57″N 95°56′55″W
- Country: United States
- State: Minnesota
- County: Grant

Area
  - Total: 34.2 sq mi (88.5 km^{2})
  - Land: 32.1 sq mi (83.2 km^{2})
  - Water: 2.0 sq mi (5.2 km^{2})
- Elevation: 1,211 ft (369 m)

Population (2000)
  - Total: 169
  - Density: 5.2/sq mi (2/km^{2})
- Time zone: UTC-6 (Central (CST))
  - Summer (DST): UTC-5 (CDT)
- FIPS code: 27-58468
- GNIS feature ID: 0665550

Sanford Township is a township in Grant County, Minnesota, United States. The population was 169 at the 2000 census.

Sanford Township was organized in 1882, and named for Henry F. Sanford, a pioneer settler.

== Geography ==
According to the United States Census Bureau, the township has a total area of 34.2 square miles (88.4 km^{2}), of which 32.1 square miles (83.2 km^{2}) is land and 2.0 square miles (5.2 km^{2}) (5.92%) is water.

== Demographics ==
At the 2000 census, there were 169 people, 59 households and 52 families residing in the township. The population density was 5.3 per square mile (2.0/km^{2}). There were 64 housing units at an average density of 2.0/sq mi (0.8/km^{2}). The racial makeup of the township was 98.82% White, 0.59% from other races, and 0.59% from two or more races. Hispanic or Latino of any race were 0.59% of the population.

There were 59 households, of which 40.7% had children under the age of 18 living with them, 81.4% were married couples living together, 3.4% had a female householder with no husband present, and 10.2% were non-families. 10.2% of all households were made up of individuals, and 5.1% had someone living alone who was 65 years of age or older. The average household size was 2.86 and the average family size was 3.08.

30.8% of the population were under the age of 18, 3.6% from 18 to 24, 25.4% from 25 to 44, 27.2% from 45 to 64, and 13.0% who were 65 years of age or older. The median age was 40 years. For every 100 females, there were 106.1 males. For every 100 females age 18 and over, there were 112.7 males.

The median household income was $45,417 and the median family income was $48,750. Males had a median income of $33,125 compared with $21,250 for females. The per capita income for the township was $22,169. None of the population or families were below the poverty line.
