= Lee Sheppard (columnist) =

Lee Sheppard is a tax commentator and contributing editor at Tax Analysts' Tax Notes. She studied law at Northwestern University, but following a stint with McDermott Will & Emery in Chicago, Sheppard has not practiced tax law since the 1970s, but instead specializes in financial issues and the taxation of multinational corporations.

Sheppard was named one of the "Global Tax 50 most influential players in international taxation by International Tax Review, Her weekly column is considered "a must-read for tax practitioners."
