= Pomme de Terre Township, Grant County, Minnesota =

Township in Minnesota, United States

Pomme de Terre Township
- Township
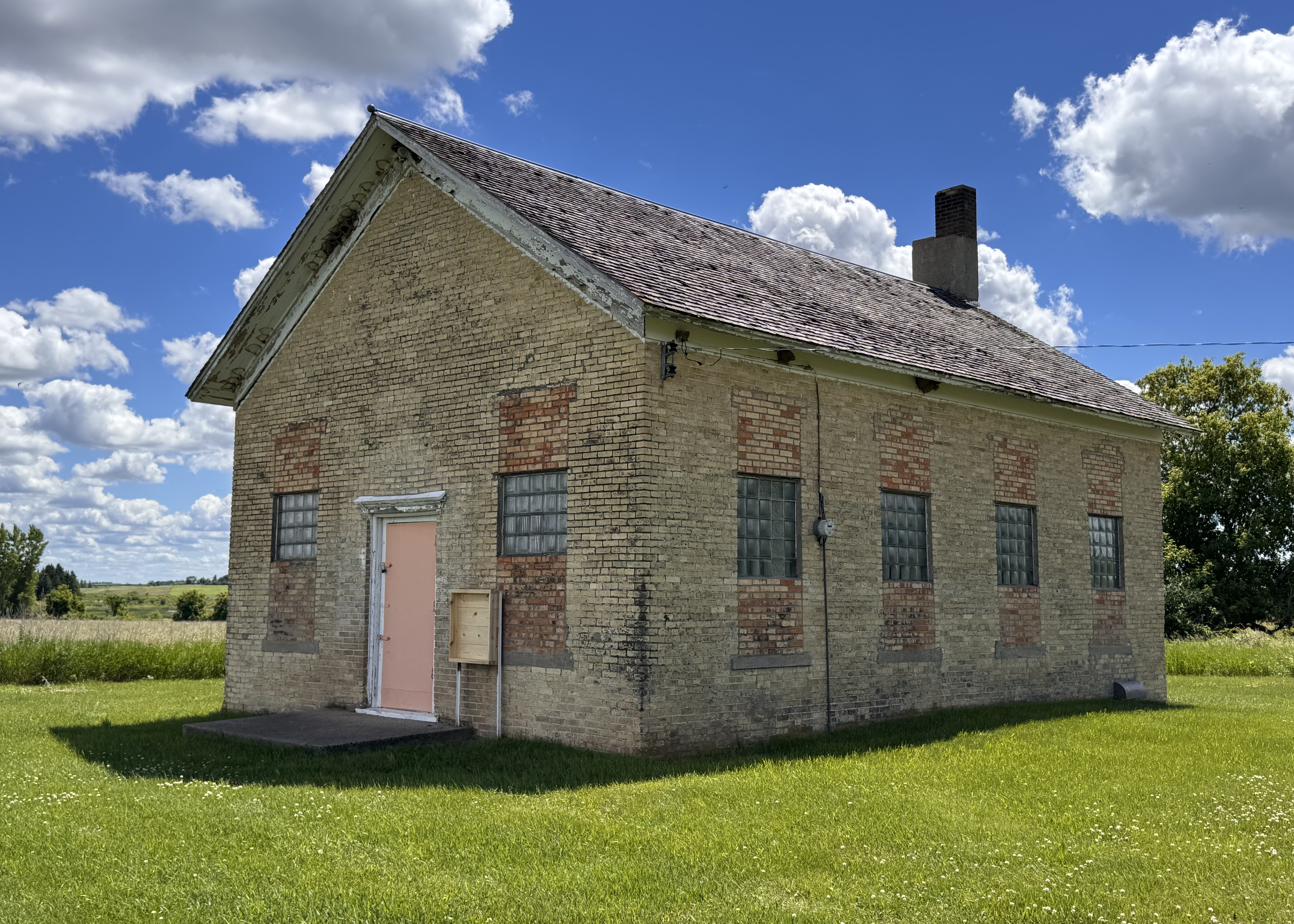
- Brick school later used as the Pomme de Terre Township Hall

- Location within the state of Minnesota Pomme de Terre Township (the United States)
- Coordinates: 46°3′52″N 95°54′39″W
- Country: United States
- State: Minnesota
- County: Grant

Area
  - Total: 35.9 sq mi (92.9 km^{2})
  - Land: 34.1 sq mi (88.3 km^{2})
  - Water: 1.8 sq mi (4.7 km^{2})
- Elevation: 1,204 ft (367 m)

Population (2000)
  - Total: 165
  - Density: 4.9/sq mi (1.9/km^{2})
- Time zone: UTC-6 (Central (CST))
  - Summer (DST): UTC-5 (CDT)
- FIPS code: 27-51838
- GNIS feature ID: 0665333

Pomme de Terre Township is a township in Grant County, Minnesota, United States. The population was 165 at the 2000 census.

== Etymology ==
The name Pomme de Terre is French and is transliterated "apple of the earth," which usually refers to the potato. In this case, however, it refers to the prairie turnip (Psoralea esculenta), a potato-like root vegetable which was commonly eaten by the Sioux.

== Geography ==
According to the United States Census Bureau, the township has a total area of 35.9 square miles (93.0 km^{2}), of which 34.1 square miles (88.3 km^{2}) is land and 1.8 square miles (4.7 km^{2}) (5.04%) is water.

== Demographics ==
As of the census of 2000, there were 165 people, 59 households, and 49 families residing in the township. The population density was 4.8 people per square mile (1.9/km^{2}). There were 76 housing units at an average density of 2.2/sq mi (0.9/km^{2}). The racial makeup of the township was 100.00% White.

There were 59 households, out of which 32.2% had children under the age of 18 living with them, 81.4% were married couples living together, 3.4% had a female householder with no husband present, and 15.3% were non-families. 11.9% of all households were made up of individuals, and 6.8% had someone living alone who was 65 years of age or older. The average household size was 2.80 and the average family size was 2.98.

In the township the population was spread out, with 28.5% under the age of 18, 5.5% from 18 to 24, 23.0% from 25 to 44, 26.1% from 45 to 64, and 17.0% who were 65 years of age or older. The median age was 37 years. For every 100 females, there were 94.1 males. For every 100 females age 18 and over, there were 100.0 males.

The median income for a household in the township was $39,063, and the median income for a family was $41,875. Males had a median income of $21,964 versus $18,750 for females. The per capita income for the township was $20,792. About 4.9% of families and 11.7% of the population were below the poverty line, including 17.1% of those under the age of eighteen and none of those 65 or over.
