= Stephen Wesley Gorton =

Stephen Wesley Gorton (13 August 1952 – 23 October 2015) was an internationally renowned Australian artist and the founder of the Paddington Art School. He lived in Sydney, Australia.

== Education ==
Stephen Wesley Gorton graduated with BA in architecture (honours) from Bristol University, UK in 1974. Later, Gorton completed a Bachelor of Architecture from Sydney University in 1976 with his major theses on "The Philosophy of Surrealism" and the art and architecture of "Antonio Gaudi". Later that year he held a one-man exhibition after being expelled from Alexander Mackie Art College for non-conformist ideas on art.

== Career ==
Gorton was described as "one of the best contemporary draughtsmen" by Sydney Art Gallery owner and expert member of the French Art Dealer's Association, Anthony Field, who went on to say, "He is one of the few whose graphic works reach beyond local or cultural boundaries and compare favourably with the best 19th and 20th Century Masters." His artworks are owned by individuals and governments worldwide. Stephen has exhibited extensively in Europe, United States, and Australia.

In early 1999, Stephen's artwork was made more widely available through a series of limited-edition prints, promoted and distributed via the Internet. They are now available from The Untapped Source or RedBubble.

=== Paddington Art School ===
Gorton also founded the Paddington Art School in Sydney, Australia, in 1980. He ran the school for 20 years intermittently while he spent periods living in New York and Cadaqués, Spain.

=== Writings ===
In 1993, he wrote and published the book Drawing Power, which explores art and the metaphysical nature of drawing and painting. It is sold out and a new edition is in progress.

=== Cadaqués ===
From 1993 to 1994, Gorton's work was managed by Captain Peter Moore, Salvador Dalí's former manager of 25 years. During this time, Gorton lived and worked in Dalí's home town of Cadaqués, Spain, where he painted numerous portraits, homages to Dalí and was offered the commission to finish Dalí's unfinished paintings, which he declined as a matter of principle.

== Exhibitions ==
- 1976 Bridges Gallery, Sydney
- 1977 Barry Stern Gallery, Sydney
- 1978 Brooklyn Collector Gallery, New York
- 1979 The Brownstone Gallery, New York
- 1980 Waverly Gallery, New York
- 1981 Artistic Eye Gallery, New York
- 1982 Streeter's Gallery, Chicago
- 1983/9 Continuous group exhibition with 19th and 20th Century European Masters, "Art and Joy Gallery", Sydney
- 1990 The Painters Gallery, Sydney
- 1991 Finalist, Archibald Prize Exhibition, New South Wales Art Gallery, Sydney
- 1993/4 Painted and exhibited in Captain Peter Moore's Salvador Dalí Museums in Cadaques, Spain
- 1994/5 Sophie Van Schendel's "Galleria Cadaqués 111", Cadaques, Spain
- 1996 The Immaculate Conceptions Gallery, Amsterdam, Holland
- 1997/8 Comenos Fine Art: "Group exhibition of 19th and 20th Century American and European Masters", Boston, Massachusetts, US
- 2000/1 Retrospective Exhibition at the Bondi Spice Gallery, North Bondi, Sydney

== Collections ==
Collections of Gorton's work include:

- Bill Clinton, Washington DC, US
- Baron Carios Coli de Rosas, Rosas, Spain
- Captain Peter Moore, Cadaqués, Spain
- Versace Art Corporation, Genoa, Italy
- Allan Stone Gallery New York
- Comenos Fine Art, Boston Massachusetts, US
- The Robert Lockwood Collection, Sydney, Australia
- Leigh Johnson

== Articles and media appearances ==
- 1980 – Australian Playboy Magazine, Sydney
- 1984 – City Express, Sydney
- 1984 – Artists and Galleries of Australia
- 1984 – Australian Artist Magazine
- 1986 – Australian Artist Magazine
- 1987 – Simply Living Magazine, Sydney
- 1988 – Ray Martin's Midday Show, Channel 9, Sydney
- 1993 – de Volkskrant, Holland
- 1993 – El Periodical, Spain
- 1994 – Daily Telegraph, UK
- 1994 – On the Street Magazine, Sydney
- 1996 – Sydney Morning Herald, Sydney
- 1996 – New Idea
- 1999 – The Sydney Times

== Sources ==
- https://nla.gov.au/nla.cat-vn2869146
