= Grant County, Minnesota =

County in Minnesota, United States

- County
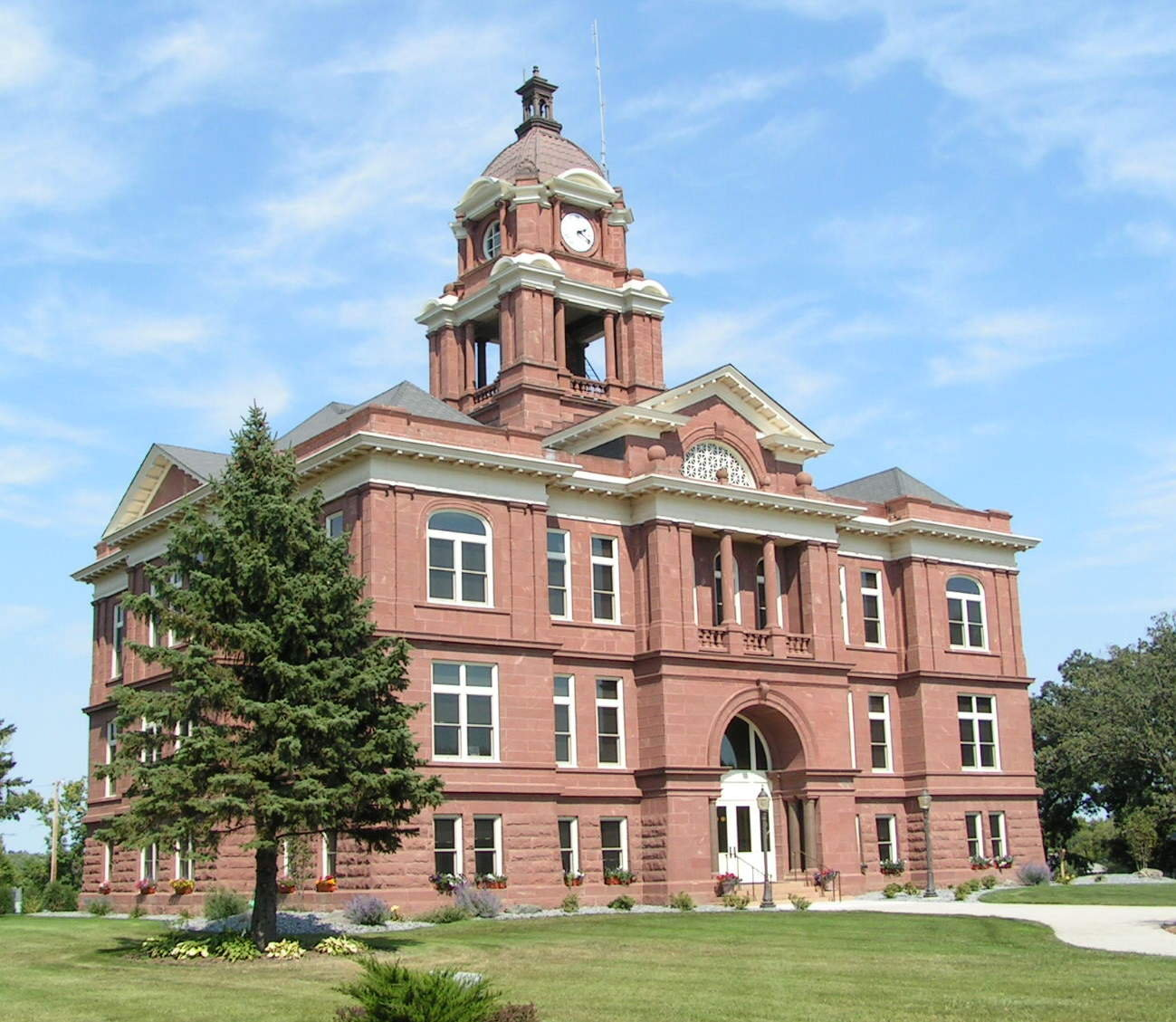
- Grant County Courthouse

- Seal

- Location within the U.S. state of Minnesota
- Coordinates: 45°56′N 96°01′W
- Country: United States
- State: Minnesota
- Created: March 6, 1868
- Organized: 1874
- Named for: Ulysses S. Grant
- Seat: Elbow Lake
- Largest city: Elbow Lake

Area
  - Total: 575 sq mi (1,490 km^{2})
  - Land: 548 sq mi (1,420 km^{2})
  - Water: 27 sq mi (70 km^{2}) 4.7%

Population (2020)
  - Total: 6,074
  - Estimate (2025): 6,085 ▲
  - Density: 11.1/sq mi (4.3/km^{2})
- Time zone: UTC−6 (Central)
  - Summer (DST): UTC−5 (CDT)
- Congressional district: 7th
- Website: www.co.grant.mn.us

Grant County is a county in the U.S. state of Minnesota. As of the 2020 census, the population was 6,074. Its county seat is Elbow Lake.

== History ==
The county was created on March 6, 1868. It was named for Civil War General and US President Ulysses S. Grant. Its government was organized in 1874.

Until May 1965, when county option was eliminated, Grant County was a dry county; no beverages with over 3.2% alcohol could be sold.

== Geography ==
The Chippewa River flows generally southward through the eastern part of Grant County. The Mustinka River flows south and then west-southwest through the upper and central parts of western Grant County. The terrain consists of low rolling hills dotted with lakes, its usable areas devoted to agriculture. The terrain generally slopes to the south and east; its highest point is on its upper eastern border, at 1,375 ft (419 m) ASL. The county has an area of 575 square miles (1,490 km^{2}), of which 548 square miles (1,420 km^{2}) is land and 27 square miles (70 km^{2}) (4.7%) is water.

Soils of Grant County

=== Major highways ===
- Interstate 94
- U.S. Highway 52
- U.S. Highway 59
- Minnesota State Highway 9
- Minnesota State Highway 27
- Minnesota State Highway 55
- Minnesota State Highway 78
- Minnesota State Highway 79

=== Adjacent counties ===
- Otter Tail County - north
- Douglas County - east
- Pope County - southeast
- Stevens County - south
- Traverse County - southwest
- Wilkin County - northwest

=== Protected areas ===
- Alvstad State Wildlife Management Area
- Berksow State Wildlife Management Area
- Chippewa State Wildlife Management Area
- Helsene State Wildlife Management Area
- Isaacson State Wildlife Management Area
- Kube-Swift State Wildlife Management Area
- Malsville State Wildlife Management Area
- Marple State Wildlife Management Area
- Mustinka State Wildlife Management Area
- Storm-Bordson State Wildlife Management Area
- Wilts State Wildlife Management Area

== Demographics ==
Historical population
Census	Pop.	Note	%±
1870	340		—
1880	3,004		783.5%
1890	6,875		128.9%
1900	8,935		30.0%
1910	9,114		2.0%
1920	9,788		7.4%
1930	9,558		−2.3%
1940	9,828		2.8%
1950	9,542		−2.9%
1960	8,870		−7.0%
1970	7,462		−15.9%
1980	7,171		−3.9%
1990	6,246		−12.9%
2000	6,289		0.7%
2010	6,018		−4.3%
2020	6,074		0.9%
2025 (est.)	6,085	▲	0.2%
U.S. Decennial Census; 1790-1960 1900-1990; 1990-2000 2010-2020

=== Racial and ethnic composition ===
Grant County, Minnesota – Racial and ethnic composition Note: the US Census treats Hispanic/Latino as an ethnic category. This table excludes Latinos from the racial categories and assigns them to a separate category. Hispanics/Latinos may be of any race.
Race / Ethnicity (NH = Non-Hispanic)	Pop 1980	Pop 1990	Pop 2000	Pop 2010	Pop 2020	% 1980	% 1990	% 2000	% 2010	% 2020
White alone (NH)	7,120	6,209	6,170	5,832	5,699	99.29%	99.41%	98.11%	96.91%	93.83%
Black or African American alone (NH)	0	3	13	19	13	0.00%	0.05%	0.21%	0.32%	0.21%
Native American or Alaska Native alone (NH)	8	15	16	4	27	0.11%	0.24%	0.25%	0.07%	0.44%
Asian alone (NH)	16	12	11	14	14	0.22%	0.19%	0.17%	0.23%	0.23%
Native Hawaiian or Pacific Islander alone (NH)	x	x	0	0	7	x	x	0.00%	0.00%	0.12%
Other race alone (NH)	2	0	0	2	4	0.03%	0.00%	0.00%	0.03%	0.07%
Mixed race or Multiracial (NH)	x	x	46	53	175	x	x	0.73%	0.88%	2.88%
Hispanic or Latino (any race)	25	7	33	94	135	0.35%	0.11%	0.52%	1.56%	2.22%
Total	7,171	6,246	6,289	6,018	6,074	100.00%	100.00%	100.00%	100.00%	100.00%

=== 2020 census ===
As of the 2020 census, the county had a population of 6,074. The median age was 43.7 years. 23.4% of residents were under the age of 18 and 23.3% of residents were 65 years of age or older. For every 100 females there were 100.3 males, and for every 100 females age 18 and over there were 100.5 males age 18 and over.

The racial makeup of the county was 94.2% White, 0.2% Black or African American, 0.5% American Indian and Alaska Native, 0.3% Asian, 0.1% Native Hawaiian and Pacific Islander, 0.8% from some other race, and 3.8% from two or more races. Hispanic or Latino residents of any race comprised 2.2% of the population.

<0.1% of residents lived in urban areas, while 100.0% lived in rural areas.

There were 2,540 households in the county, of which 27.1% had children under the age of 18 living in them. Of all households, 52.9% were married-couple households, 19.1% were households with a male householder and no spouse or partner present, and 21.5% were households with a female householder and no spouse or partner present. About 30.2% of all households were made up of individuals and 14.6% had someone living alone who was 65 years of age or older.

There were 3,155 housing units, of which 19.5% were vacant. Among occupied housing units, 79.6% were owner-occupied and 20.4% were renter-occupied. The homeowner vacancy rate was 1.7% and the rental vacancy rate was 11.1%.

=== 2000 census ===
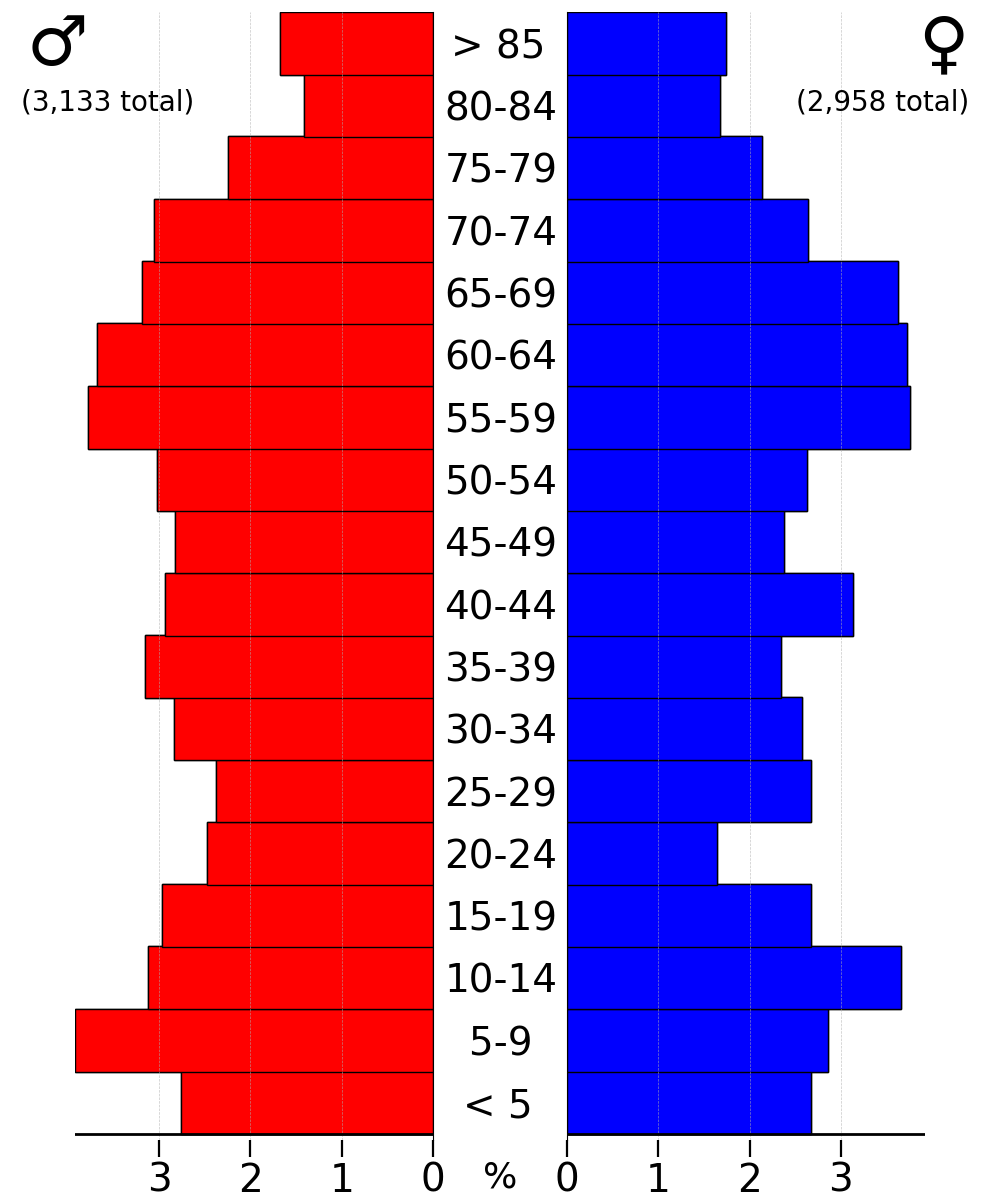
2022 US Census population pyramid for Grant County, from ACS 5-year estimate

As of the census of 2000, there were 6,289 people, 2,534 households, and 1,740 families in the county. The population density was 11.6 per square mile (4.5/km^{2}). There were 3,098 housing units at an average density of 5.74 per square mile (2.22/km^{2}). The racial makeup of the county was 98.28% White, 0.21% Black or African American, 0.27% Native American, 0.19% Asian, 0.30% from other races, and 0.75% from two or more races. 0.52% of the population were Hispanic or Latino of any race. 41.2% were of Norwegian, 30.0% German and 7.4% Swedish ancestry.

There were 2,534 households, out of which 29.20% had children under the age of 18 living with them, 59.00% were married couples living together, 6.50% had a female householder with no husband present, and 31.30% were non-families. 28.00% of all households were made up of individuals, and 16.50% had someone living alone who was 65 years of age or older. The average household size was 2.40 and the average family size was 2.94.

The county population contained 23.90% under the age of 18, 6.90% from 18 to 24, 23.10% from 25 to 44, 23.20% from 45 to 64, and 22.90% who were 65 years of age or older. The median age was 42 years. For every 100 females there were 94.50 males. For every 100 females age 18 and over, there were 94.30 males.

The median income for a household in the county was $33,775, and the median income for a family was $42,214. Males had a median income of $28,428 versus $20,240 for females. The per capita income for the county was $17,131. About 6.00% of families and 8.40% of the population were below the poverty line, including 9.50% of those under age 18 and 9.90% of those age 65 or over.

== Communities ==
=== Cities ===
- Ashby
- Barrett
- Elbow Lake (county seat)
- Herman
- Hoffman
- Norcross
- Wendell

=== Unincorporated communities ===
- Charlesville (partial)
- Erdahl

=== Ghost towns ===
- Hereford
- Pomme de Terre
- Thorsborg

=== Townships ===
- Delaware Township
- Elbow Lake Township
- Elk Lake Township
- Erdahl Township
- Gorton Township
- Land Township
- Lawrence Township
- Lien Township
- Logan Township
- Macsville Township
- North Ottawa Township
- Pelican Lake Township
- Pomme de Terre Township
- Roseville Township
- Sanford Township
- Stony Brook Township

== Government and politics ==
Grant County is a swing district that has leaned Republican in recent elections. As of 2024, the county has selected the Republican presidential candidate in 67% of national elections from 1980 inclusive.

United States presidential election results for Grant County, Minnesota
Year	Republican		Democratic		Third party(ies)	
Year	No.	%	No.	%	No.	%
1892	776	55.35%	319	22.75%	307	21.90%
1896	1,002	56.29%	739	41.52%	39	2.19%
1900	1,062	65.76%	456	28.24%	97	6.01%
1904	1,209	87.67%	102	7.40%	68	4.93%
1908	1,099	70.04%	376	23.96%	94	5.99%
1912	146	9.36%	381	24.42%	1,033	66.22%
1916	878	49.19%	778	43.59%	129	7.23%
1920	2,427	75.80%	533	16.65%	242	7.56%
1924	1,674	49.21%	118	3.47%	1,610	47.33%
1928	2,057	54.33%	1,687	44.56%	42	1.11%
1932	1,148	29.17%	2,702	68.67%	85	2.16%
1936	1,566	38.43%	2,358	57.87%	151	3.71%
1940	2,443	51.28%	2,291	48.09%	30	0.63%
1944	1,898	48.93%	1,969	50.76%	12	0.31%
1948	1,789	40.77%	2,378	54.19%	221	5.04%
1952	2,665	59.51%	1,791	40.00%	22	0.49%
1956	2,064	49.41%	2,107	50.44%	6	0.14%
1960	2,239	48.93%	2,333	50.98%	4	0.09%
1964	1,734	39.72%	2,631	60.26%	1	0.02%
1968	1,929	47.11%	1,982	48.40%	184	4.49%
1972	1,899	46.84%	2,085	51.43%	70	1.73%
1976	1,635	37.69%	2,624	60.49%	79	1.82%
1980	2,054	48.08%	1,822	42.65%	396	9.27%
1984	2,111	52.84%	1,867	46.73%	17	0.43%
1988	1,693	46.04%	1,950	53.03%	34	0.92%
1992	1,201	32.76%	1,561	42.58%	904	24.66%
1996	1,284	36.05%	1,806	50.70%	472	13.25%
2000	1,804	49.78%	1,507	41.58%	313	8.64%
2004	1,893	49.57%	1,856	48.60%	70	1.83%
2008	1,646	45.66%	1,850	51.32%	109	3.02%
2012	1,748	50.13%	1,647	47.23%	92	2.64%
2016	2,063	59.40%	1,105	31.82%	305	8.78%
2020	2,269	62.10%	1,300	35.58%	85	2.33%
2024	2,266	63.96%	1,187	33.50%	90	2.54%

County Board of Commissioners
Position	Name	District
Commissioner and Chairperson	Troy Johnson	District 1
Commissioner	Dwight Walvatne	District 2
Commissioner	Ken Johnson	District 3
Commissioner	Bill LaValley	District 4
Commissioner	Doyle Sperr	District 5

State Legislature (2021-2023)
Position	Name	Affiliation	District
Senate	Torrey Westrom	Republican	District 12
House of Representatives	Jeff Backer	Republican	District 12A

U.S Congress (2021-2023)
Position	Name	Affiliation	District
House of Representatives	Michelle Fischbach	Republican	7th
Senate	Amy Klobuchar	Democrat	N/A
Senate	Tina Smith	Democrat	N/A

== See also ==
- National Register of Historic Places listings in Grant County, Minnesota
