= Minnesota State Highway 106 =

State highway in Minnesota, United States

Trunk Highway 106
- MN 106 highlighted in red

Route information
- Maintained by MnDOT
- Length: 7.365 mi (11.853 km)
- Existed: April 22, 1933–present

Major junctions
- South end: MN 29 in Deer Creek
- CSAH 52 in Deer Creek Township.
- North end: US 10 in Newton Township

Location
- Country: United States
- State: Minnesota
- Counties: Otter Tail

Highway system
- Minnesota Trunk Highway System; Interstate; US; State; Legislative; Scenic
← MN 105	→ MN 107

Minnesota State Highway 106 (MN 106) is a 7.365-mile-long (11.853 km) highway in west-central Minnesota, which runs from its intersection with State Highway 29 in Deer Creek and continues north to its northern terminus at its intersection with U.S. Highway 10 near New York Mills.

Highway 106 passes through the communities of Deer Creek, Deer Creek Township, and Newton Township.

== Route description ==
State Highway 106 serves as a north–south route between Deer Creek and New York Mills in west-central Minnesota.

The route is located in Otter Tail County.

The speed limit from north of Deer Creek to US 10 is 60 mph (95 km/h) and 30 mph (50 km/h) inside the Deer Creek city limits to its southern end at MN 29.

Highway 106 crosses the Leaf River in Deer Creek Township.

The route is legally defined as Route 184 in the Minnesota Statutes. It is not marked with this number.

== History ==
State Highway 106 was authorized in 1933.

The route was paved by 1953.

== Major intersections ==
The entire route is in Otter Tail County.

Location	mi	km	Destinations	Notes
Deer Creek	0.000	0.000	MN 29 – Alexandria	Southern terminus
Deer Creek	0.211	0.340	CSAH 50 (Main Street)	
Deer Creek Township	2.777	4.469	CSAH 52	
Newton Township	5.748	9.251	CR 142	
Newton Township	7.403	11.914	US 10 – Wadena, Detroit Lakes	Northern terminus
1.000 mi = 1.609 km; 1.000 km = 0.621 mi
