= Glyndon =

Glyndon may refer to several locations in the United States:

- Glyndon, Minnesota in Clay County
- Glyndon Township, Clay County, Minnesota
- Glyndon, Maryland, near Reisterstown
- Glyndon, London, a place in the Royal Borough of Greenwich, southeast London, United Kingdom, in the Plumstead area.
