= Little Falls Township =

Little Falls Township may refer to the following townships in the United States:

- Little Falls Township, Morrison County, Minnesota
- Little Falls Township, New Jersey in Passaic County
