= Minnesota State Highway 29 =

State highway in Minnesota, United States

Trunk Highway 29
- MN 29 highlighted in red

Route information
- Maintained by MnDOT
- Length: 126.592 mi (203.730 km)
- Existed: November 2, 1920–present

Major junctions
- South end: US 59 / US 212 at Montevideo
- MN 7 at Montevideo; US 12 / MN 9 at Benson; MN 28 / MN 114 at Starbuck; MN 28 / MN 104 at Glenwood; MN 55 near Glenwood; I-94 / US 52 / MN 27 at Alexandria; MN 210 at Inman Township; MN 106 at Deer Creek
- North end: US 71 at Wadena

Location
- Country: United States
- State: Minnesota
- Counties: Chippewa, Swift, Pope, Douglas, Otter Tail, Wadena

Highway system
- Minnesota Trunk Highway System; Interstate; US; State; Legislative; Scenic
← MN 28	→ MN 30

Minnesota State Highway 29 (MN 29) is a 126.592-mile-long (203.730 km) highway in west-central Minnesota, which runs from its junction with U.S. Highways 59 and 212 in Montevideo and continues north to its terminus at U.S. Highway 71 in Wadena.

== Route description ==
Highway 29 serves as a north–south route between Montevideo, Benson, Glenwood, Alexandria, and Wadena.

Highway 29 is built as a four-lane divided highway on the south side of Alexandria to Interstate Highway 94/US Highway 52.

Glacial Lakes State Park is located on Highway 29 in Pope County. The park is located South of Starbuck.

Lake Carlos State Park is located on Highway 29 in Douglas County. The park is located ten miles (16 km) north of Alexandria.

Highway 29 parallels U.S. Highway 71 throughout its route in west-central Minnesota.

The northern terminus for Highway 29 is its intersection with U.S. 71 in Wadena, three blocks south of U.S. 10.

== History ==
Highway 29 was established November 2, 1920, traveling from Glenwood to Wadena. In 1923, the road was intermittently graveled; all graveling was completed by 1929.

A paved surface was applied to the roadway in stages from Alexandria to Parkers Prairie from 1926 through 1933. South of Alexandria, it was paved to the county line in 1931, and to a Northern Pacific railway crossing at Glenwood in 1933. Also in 1933, the highway was realigned between Deer Creek and Wadena, providing a shorter, more direct route.

In 1934, the route was extended south along former State Highway 38 from Starbuck south to U.S. 212 at Montevideo. This extension was paved between Montevideo and a point north of Benson, and gravel along the remainder.

=== Highway 38 ===
Trunk Highway 38
- Location: Montevideo to Starbuck
- Length: 55 mi (89 km)
- Existed: 1920–1934

Trunk Highway 38 was established November 2, 1920, traveling from Montevideo north to Starbuck. It was paved with concrete through Benson and several miles north and south of that town at the time it was marked. It was paved from Montevideo to the existing pavement south of Benson in 1931.

=== 1934 onward ===
Highway 29 was paved from Parkers Prairie to Wadena in 1935.

The highway was realigned south of Starbuck in 1938 to eliminate a pair of sharp turns and paved from there to Highway 28, and then from that point south to the county line in 1940. After a replacement of the existing surface south of Alexandria in 1941, the highway was paved in its entirety.

When Interstate 94 was built through Douglas County in 1967, Highway 29 was upgraded to four lanes from the freeway north into Alexandria.

== Major intersections ==
County	Location	mi	km	Destinations	Notes
Chippewa	Montevideo	0.000	0.000	US 212 / US 59 south – Granite Falls, Dawson, Marshall	South end of US 59 overlap
Chippewa	Montevideo	0.174	0.280	MN 7 west / US 59 north – Appleton	North end of US 59 overlap, south end of MN 7 overlap
Chippewa	Montevideo	1.456	2.343	MN 7 east – Clara City	North end of MN 7 overlap
Chippewa	Mandt Township	12.299	19.793	MN 40 west – Milan	West end of MN 40 overlap
Chippewa	Grace Township	18.288	29.432	MN 40 east – Willmar	East end of MN 40 overlap
Swift	Benson	32.419	52.173	US 12 west – Ortonville	South end of US 12 overlap
Swift	Benson	32.760	52.722	US 12 east / MN 9 – Willmar, Morris	North end of US 12 overlap
Pope	Starbuck	54.952	88.437	MN 28 west / MN 114 north – Morris, Lowry	West end of MN 28 overlap
Pope	Long Beach			CSAH 24 / Glacial Ridge Trail	
Pope	Long Beach			Golf Course Road / Glacial Ridge Trail	
Pope	Glenwood	63.431	102.082	MN 28 east / MN 104 south – Sauk Centre, Sunburg	East end of MN 28 overlap
Pope	Leven Township	65.188	104.910	MN 55 – Elbow Lake, Belgrade	
Douglas	Alexandria	76.932	123.810	I-94 / MN 27 (US 52) – Fergus Falls, St. Cloud	Interchange; I-94 Exit 103
Douglas	Alexandria	77.967	125.476	CSAH 46 / I-94 Alt. / MN 29 Truck / Glacial Ridge Trail (34th Street) – Hoffman	Former MN 27 west
Douglas	Alexandria	80.222	129.105	CSAH 82 west	South end of CSAH 82 overlap; former US 52 west
Douglas	Alexandria	80.752	129.958	CSAH 82 east	North end of CSAH 82 overlap; former MN 27 east; previously US 52 east
Douglas	Alexandria	81.295	130.832	CSAH 42 / Glacial Ridge Trail	
Douglas	Alexandria	82.227	132.332	CSAH 46 / MN 29 Truck	
Otter Tail	Parkers Prairie	99.981	160.904	CSAH 38 west / CSAH 46 east – Urbank, Eagle Bend	Former MN 235 west
Otter Tail	Inman Township	112.360	180.826	MN 210 – Henning, Staples	
Otter Tail	Deer Creek	116.654	187.736	MN 106 – US 10	
Wadena	Wadena	126.557	203.674	US 71 – US 10	
1.000 mi = 1.609 km; 1.000 km = 0.621 mi: Concurrency terminus
