= Minnesota State Highway 336 =

State highway in Minnesota, United States

Trunk Highway 336
- MN 336 highlighted in red

Route information
- Maintained by MnDOT
- Length: 2.251 mi (3.623 km)
- Existed: June 4, 1991–present

Major junctions
- South end: I-94 / US 52 / CSAH 11 near Moorhead
- North end: US 10 / CSAH 11 near Dilworth

Location
- Country: United States
- State: Minnesota
- Counties: Clay

Highway system
- Minnesota Trunk Highway System; Interstate; US; State; Legislative; Scenic
← MN 332	→ MN 361

Minnesota State Highway 336 (MN 336) is a short 2.251-mile-long (3.623 km) highway in northwest Minnesota, which runs from its interchange with Interstate 94/US Highway 52 near Moorhead and continues north to its interchange with U.S. Highway 10 near Dilworth and Glyndon.

== Route description ==
Highway 336 serves as a short north–south connector route in northwest Minnesota, connecting Interstate 94 and U.S. 10, immediately east of the city of Moorhead. It is almost entirely located in Glyndon Township, except for briefly passing through the city limits of Dilworth. The unincorporated community of Watts is located along the route. Highway 336 is located within the Fargo–Moorhead metro area.

Highway 336 is built as a four-lane divided highway with interchanges at each end. The roadway has always been a vital connection between Interstate 94 and U.S. 10, providing a gateway to nearby Detroit Lakes, a recreation destination area. Because it is a significant connector route with a high traffic volume, the short route is classified as part of the National Highway System.

The route is legally defined as Route 336 in the Minnesota Statutes.

== History ==
Highway 336 was authorized on June 4, 1991. It was routed along what was formerly part of County State-Aid Highway 11. It was paved prior to becoming a state highway.

Constant train activity and excessive weekend traffic not only deteriorated the roadway, but also caused major traffic headaches. In 2002, a reconstruction project began that expanded the roadway to four-lanes and added off-ramps to its junction with U.S. Highway 10 near Dilworth, as well as a new overpass constructed over the railroad crossing. In addition, the last 1/4 mile of Highway 336 at the north end was moved 350 feet (110 m) to the east to avoid demolition of a grain silo and an old farmstead which has since burned down.

== Major intersections ==
The entire route is in Glyndon Township, Clay County.

mi	km	Destinations	Notes
0.000	0.000	I-94 / US 52 / CSAH 11 – Moorhead, Fergus Falls	Interchange; I-94 Exit 6; southern end of CSAH 11 concurrency
2.251	3.623	US 10 / CSAH 11 – Dilworth, Glyndon, Detroit Lakes	Interchange; northern end of CSAH 11 concurrency
1.000 mi = 1.609 km; 1.000 km = 0.621 mi: Concurrency terminus
