= Gregory, Minnesota =

- Unincorporated community
- Location within Minnesota Location within the United States
- Coordinates: 45°56′22″N 94°21′23″W
- Country: United States
- State: Minnesota
- County: Morrison
- Township: Little Falls
- Elevation: 1,109 ft (338 m)
- Time zone: UTC-6 (Central (CST))
  - Summer (DST): UTC-5 (CDT)
- ZIP code: 56345
- Area code: 320
- GNIS feature ID: 654737

Gregory is an unincorporated community in Little Falls Township, Morrison County, Minnesota, United States, near Little Falls. The community is located near the intersection of 123rd Street and Haven Road, Morrison County Road 76.

U.S. Highway 10 and 1st Street SE are also in the immediate area.

The community was named for J. Gregory Smith, a railroad official.

== Transportation ==
Amtrak’s Empire Builder, which operates between Seattle/Portland and Chicago, passes through the town on BNSF tracks, but makes no stop. The nearest station is located in St. Cloud, 31 miles (50 km) to the south.
