= Craig Tracy =

Craig Tracy may refer to:

- Craig Tracy (mathematician)
- Craig Tracy (artist)

== See also ==
- Craig Tracey, British politician
- Craig Tracey (rugby league)
