= Slonina =

Slonina or Słonina is a surname. Notable people with the surname include:

- Gabriel Slonina (born 2004), Polish American goalkeeper
- Jimmy Slonina, actor
- Łukasz Słonina (born 1989), Polish biathlete
- Nicholas Slonina (born 2001), Polish American soccer player
- Patricia Slonina, first woman editor of the literary magazine, The Alembic at Providence College
- Robin Barcus Slonina (born 1971), American artist
- Stanisław Słonina, 2007 Per Artem ad Deum Medal

== See also ==
- Salo (food), known as słonina in Polish
