= U.S. Route 10 in Minnesota =

Section of U.S. Numbered Highway in Minnesota, United States

U.S. Highway 10
- US 10 highlighted in red

Route information
- Maintained by MnDOT
- Length: 275.473 mi (443.331 km)
- Existed: November 11, 1926–present

Major junctions
- West end: US 10 / I-94 BL at Fargo, ND
- US 75 / I-94 BL at Moorhead; US 59 / MN 34 at Detroit Lakes; US 71 at Wadena; US 169 / MN 101 at Elk River; US 169 / MN 47 at Anoka; I-35W at Mounds View; I-694 at Arden Hills; I-35E at Little Canada; I-94 / US 52 / US 61 at St. Paul
- East end: US 10 at Prescott, WI

Location
- Country: United States
- State: Minnesota
- Counties: Clay, Becker, Otter Tail, Wadena, Todd, Morrison, Benton, Sherburne, Anoka, Ramsey, Washington

Highway system
- United States Numbered Highway System; List; Special; Divided; Minnesota Trunk Highway System; Interstate; US; State; Legislative; Scenic
← MN 9	→ MN 11

U.S. Highway 10 (US 10) is a major divided highway for almost all of its length in the U.S. state of Minnesota. The route runs through the central portion of the state, following generally the alignment of the former Northern Pacific Railway (now BNSF Railway) and connects the cities of Moorhead, Detroit Lakes, Wadena, Staples, Little Falls, St. Cloud, Elk River, Anoka, Coon Rapids, Saint Paul, and Cottage Grove. US 10 within Minnesota is 275 miles (443 km) in length.

== Route description ==
US 10 enters the state from North Dakota and heads through Moorhead parallel to Interstate 94 (I-94) and US 52 until it exits the city. US 10 then takes a more northerly route than I-94/US 52 to St. Cloud by heading through Detroit Lakes, Wadena, and Little Falls. From St. Cloud to Mounds View, US 10 is a busy route through the suburbs of St. Cloud and Minneapolis.

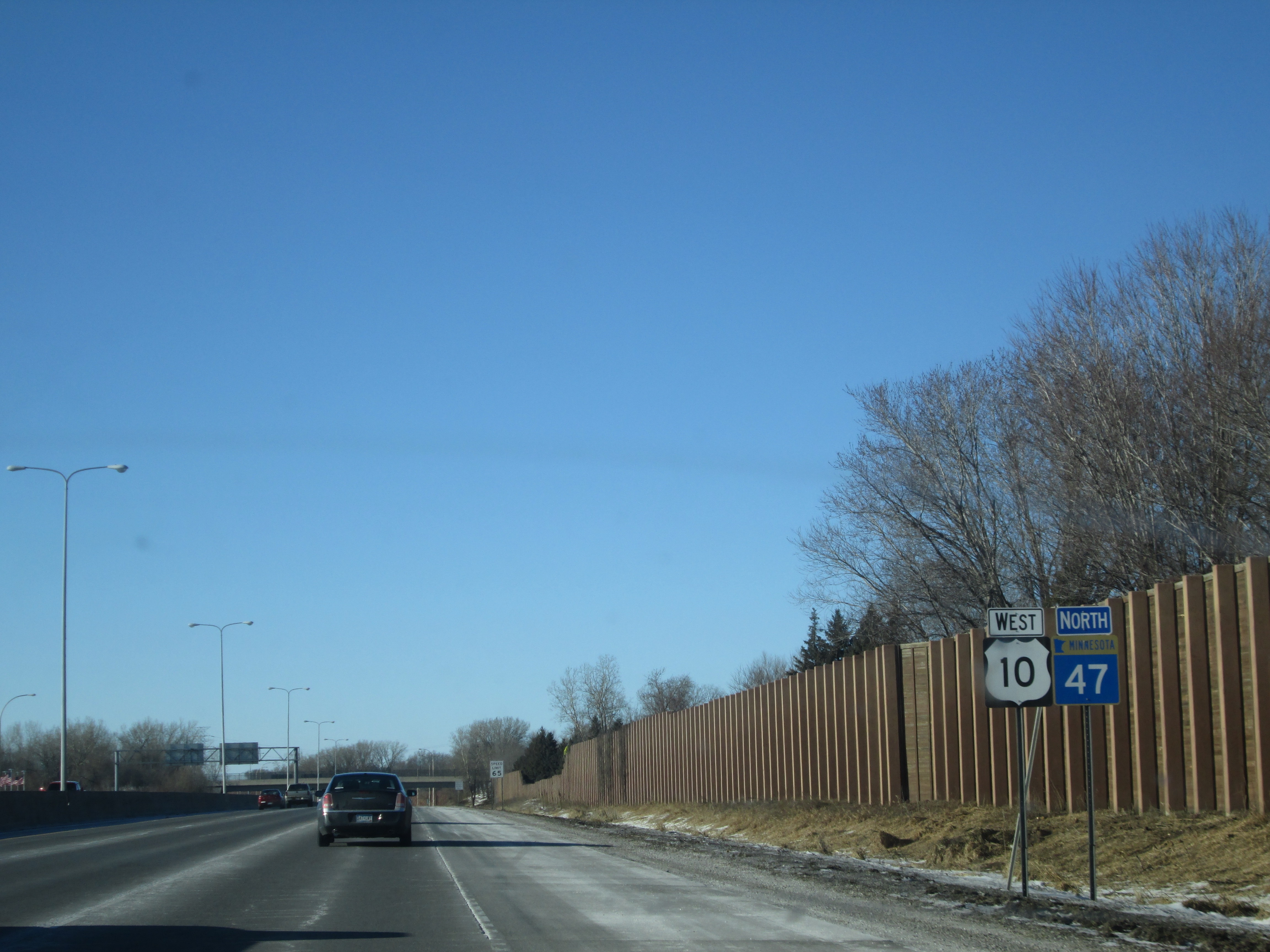
Concurrency of US 10 and Minnesota State Highway 47 in Coon Rapids

East of Mounds View, US 10 is marked mostly along Interstate Highways until Saint Paul, where the route runs concurrently with US 61 to Cottage Grove. US 10 then heads east to the Wisconsin state line and exits the state.

US 10 is a divided highway along most of its length through the state, with posted 65-mile-per-hour (105 km/h) speed limits along much of the way, except for two-lane or undivided four-lane stretches through Wadena and Motley. There are some 60-mile-per-hour (97 km/h) posted speed limits in the four-lane section between Elk River and Anoka and the two-lane section between Bluffton and Wadena.

Legally, the Minnesota section of US 10 is defined as unmarked Constitutional / Legislative Routes 2, 37, 27, 3, 62, and 94 in the Minnesota Statutes §§ 161.114(2) and 161.115(25). US 10 is not marked with these legislative numbers along the actual highway.

=== Transit ===
Intercity bus service is provided by Jefferson Lines along the northwestern portion of the US 10 corridor from the North Dakota state line to Staples.

== History ==
US 10 was established on November 11, 1926. Originally, the route split between Moorhead and St. Cloud into US 10N and US 10S. In 1934, US 10S was replaced by US 52 (now I-94) and US 10N became simply US 10.

US 10 in Minnesota was paved between St. Cloud and Minneapolis–Saint Paul as early as 1929. The remainder of the route was paved by 1950.

The four-lane divided highway section between the cities of Elk River and Anoka was constructed by 1942.

The freeway section of US 10 between the city of Anoka and University Avenue (at the Coon Rapids–Blaine boundary line) was completed in the early 1970s. The new freeway section of US 10 between University Avenue and I-35W in Mounds View was completed in 1999.

From 1934 to 1999, US 10 was located on a different alignment between Coon Rapids, Spring Lake Park, and Mounds View. This is now known as County Road 10.

When I-694 and I-35E were completed in the late 1960s, US 10 was then signed concurrently with these highways east of Mounds View to the city of Saint Paul.

As of 2025, US 10 in Minneapolis–Saint Paul has been built to a freeway standard from Ramsey to Cottage Grove (save for three signalized intersections at Burns Avenue, Warner Road, and Lower Afton Road).

== Major intersections ==
County	Location	mi	km	Exit	Destinations	Notes
Red River of the North		0.000	0.000		US 10 west / I-94 BL west (Main Avenue) – Fargo	Continuation into North Dakota
Red River of the North		0.000	0.000	Veterans Memorial Bridge; North Dakota–Minnesota line		
Clay	Moorhead	0.428	0.689		US 75 south (8th Street) / I-94 BL east (Main Avenue) – Breckenridge	Western end of US 75 concurrency; eastern end of I-94 Bus. concurrency; at-grade intersection
Clay	Moorhead	1.450	2.334		US 75 north – Crookston	Eastern end of US 75 concurrency; at-grade intersection
Clay	Glyndon Township	5.954	9.582	–	MN 336 south / CSAH 11 north (70th Street) to I-94	Interchange
Clay	Riverton Township	12.786	20.577		MN 9 – Barnesville, Ada, Crookston	At-grade intersection
Clay	Eglon Township	24.438	39.329	–	MN 32 (260th Street) – Twin Valley, Rollag	
Becker	Detroit Lakes	44.337– 44.357	71.353– 71.386		MN 34 / US 59 – Fergus Falls, Mahnomen, Park Rapids	At-grade intersection
Becker	Burlington Township	54.526– 54.905	87.751– 88.361	–	MN 87 east / CSAH 29 – Frazee, Vergas	
Otter Tail	Gorman Township	60.020	96.593		CSAH 60 west – Vergas	At-grade intersection; former MN 228
Otter Tail	Perham Township	62.721– 63.029	100.940– 101.435	–	CSAH 80 east (Main Street) – Perham	Eastbound exit and westbound entrance
Otter Tail	Perham	66.469– 66.953	106.971– 107.750	–	MN 78 south (Otter Trail Scenic Byway) / CSAH 8 north (3rd Avenue SE) – Perham, Battle Lake	
Otter Tail	New York Mills	77.497– 77.916	124.719– 125.394	–	CSAH 67 (Broadway Avenue) – New York Mills	
Otter Tail	Newton Township	80.863	130.136		MN 106 south – Deer Creek	At-grade intersection
Wadena	Wadena	90.631	145.856		US 71 to MN 29 – Long Prairie, Menahga, Park Rapids	At-grade intersection; access to Wadena Clinic
Todd	Staples	108.340– 108.347	174.356– 174.368		MN 210 west – Hewitt, Fergus Falls	Western end of MN 210 concurrency; at-grade intersection
Morrison	Motley	115.343– 115.424	185.627– 185.757		MN 210 east – Brainerd	Eastern end of MN 210 concurrency; at-grade intersection
Todd	No major junctions					
Morrison	Randall	136.958	220.413		MN 115 east – Camp Ripley	At-grade intersection
Morrison	Green Prairie Township	143.822– 144.266	231.459– 232.174	–	CSAH 52 – Little Falls	Former US 10 east; western end of freeway
Morrison	Green Prairie Township	145.151– 145.169	233.598– 233.627	–	CSAH 13	Westbound exit and eastbound entrance
Morrison	Little Falls	146.183– 146.284	235.259– 235.421	–	CSAH 76 – Little Falls	Former MN 371
Morrison	Little Falls	146.990– 147.011	236.557– 236.591	–	MN 371 north – Brainerd	Westbound exit and eastbound entrance
Morrison	Little Falls	147.864– 148.361	237.964– 238.764	–	MN 27 – Pierz, Little Falls	Access to St. Gabriel's Hospital and Charles A. Lindbergh State Park
Morrison	Gregory	151.357	243.585	–	CSAH 76 – Little Falls	Westbound exit and eastbound entrance; former US 10 west; eastern end of freeway; access to St. Gabriel's Hospital and Charles A. Lindbergh State Park
Benton	Rice	164.908	265.394	–	CSAH 31	Former US 10; eastbound RIRO only
Benton	Rice	165.685	266.644	–	CSAH 2 – Rice	Interchange
Benton	Rice	166.581	268.086		CSAH 31	Eastbound entrance only; former US 10
Benton	Sauk Rapids	172.992– 173.432	278.404– 279.112	–	CSAH 33 – Sartell	
Benton	Sartell	175.491– 175.697	282.425– 282.757	–	MN 15 south – St. Cloud	Eastbound exit and westbound entrance; access to St. Cloud VA Health Care System
Benton	Sauk Rapids	176.068– 176.361	283.354– 283.826	–	CSAH 29 (35th Street NE) / I-94 Alt. west to MN 15 – Sartell	
Benton	Sauk Rapids	177.354– 177.864	285.424– 286.244	–	CSAH 3 (Golden Spike Road) – Sauk Rapids	Former MN 152
Benton	Sauk Rapids–St. Cloud line	178.753– 179.378	287.675– 288.681	–	Benton Drive – Sauk Rapids	Signed as Benton Drive eastbound and Sauk Rapids westbound
Benton	St. Cloud	179.754– 180.127	289.286– 289.886	–	MN 23 (3rd Street SE) – St. Cloud, Foley	Interchange; access to St. Cloud Hospital
Sherburne	St. Cloud	182.093	293.050		MN 301 west (Minnesota Boulevard)	At-grade intersection
Sherburne	Clear Lake	190.738	306.963		MN 24 south / CSAH 6 to I-94 – Clearwater	At-grade intersection
Sherburne	Becker	196.139	315.655		MN 25 north / CR 52 – Foley	Western end of MN 25 concurrency; at-grade intersection
Sherburne	Becker Township	201.516	324.309		CSAH 11 / I-94 Alt. east – Monticello, Santiago	At-grade intersection; access to Monticello Hospital
Sherburne	Big Lake	205.652– 205.661	330.965– 330.979		MN 25 south – Monticello	Eastern end of MN 25 concurrency; at-grade intersection; access to Monticello Hospital
Sherburne	Big Lake Township	209.855– 210.239	337.729– 338.347	–	CSAH 14 south / CSAH 15 north	
Sherburne	Elk River	216.029– 216.524	347.665– 348.462	–	MN 101 south / US 169 north / I-94 Alt. east – Rogers, Elk River	Western end of US 169 concurrency
Anoka	Ramsey	222.194	357.587	220	CSAH 83 (Armstrong Boulevard NW)	Western end of freeway
Anoka	Ramsey			221	CSAH 56 (Ramsey Boulevard NW)	
Anoka	Ramsey			222	CSAH 57 (Sunfish Lake Boulevard NW)	
Anoka	Anoka			223	Cutters Grove Avenue / Thurston Avenue	
Anoka	Anoka	226.067– 226.361	363.820– 364.293	224A	Main Street / Greenhaven Road	Former US 10 east
Anoka	Anoka	226.590– 226.841	364.661– 365.065	224B	US 169 south / MN 47 north (Ferry Street)	Eastern end of US 169 concurrency; western end of MN 47 concurrency
Anoka	Anoka	227.158– 227.448	365.575– 366.042	225	CSAH 7 (7th Avenue)	Access to Anoka Metro Regional Treatment Center
Anoka	Coon Rapids	227.218– 227.533	365.672– 366.179	226	CSAH 9 (Round Lake Boulevard)	
Anoka	Coon Rapids	229.135– 229.480	368.757– 369.312	227	CSAH 14 (Main Street)	Former MN 242
Anoka	Coon Rapids	230.692– 231.364	371.263– 372.344	229	CSAH 78 (Hanson Boulevard)	
Anoka	Coon Rapids	233.545– 234.159	375.854– 376.842	–	CSAH 11 (Foley Boulevard)	Eastbound exit splits from MN 47 south
Anoka	Coon Rapids	233.278– 234.328	375.425– 377.114	–	MN 47 south	Eastern end of MN 47 concurrency; eastbound exit and westbound entrance
Anoka	Coon Rapids	234.502– 235.181	377.394– 378.487	–	MN 610 west – Minneapolis	Eastbound exit splits from MN 47 south
Anoka	Coon Rapids–Blaine line	234.869	377.985	–	CSAH 51 (University Avenue)	Westbound exit and eastbound entrance; westbound exit splits from MN 610 west
Anoka	Blaine	235.986– 236.516	379.783– 380.636	–	MN 65 (Central Avenue)	
Anoka	Blaine	237.021– 237.508	381.448– 382.232	–	County J / 85th Avenue Northeast / Airport Road	
Ramsey	Mounds View	238.535– 238.948	383.885– 384.550	236 30	I-35W north – Duluth	Western end of I-35W concurrency; left exits both directions, left entrance eastbound
Ramsey	Arden Hills–Mounds View line			29	County I	
Ramsey	Arden Hills–Mounds View line	240.520	387.079	28C	CR 10 / County H	
Ramsey	Arden Hills–Mounds View line	238.393	383.656	28B	I-35W south – Minneapolis	Eastern end of I-35W concurrency; eastbound left exit and westbound left entrance
Ramsey	Arden Hills	241.120	388.045	–	CSAH 96	Eastbound exit and westbound entrance
Ramsey	Arden Hills	242.627– 242.984	390.470– 391.045	42B	MN 51 south (Snelling Avenue)	Eastbound exit and westbound entrance
Ramsey	Arden Hills	243.115	391.256	42A	I-694 west	Western end of I-694 concurrency; westbound exit and eastbound entrance
Ramsey	Arden Hills–Shoreview line	242.984	391.045	42C	Lexington Avenue	
Ramsey	Shoreview			43	CSAH 52 (Victoria Street)	
Ramsey	Shoreview			45	CSAH 49 (Rice Street)	Former MN 49
Ramsey	Little Canada	275.460	443.310	46 113	I-35E north / I-694 east	Eastern end of I-694 concurrency; western end of I-35E concurrency
Ramsey	Little Canada			112	CSAH 21 (Little Canada Road)	Exit numbers use I-35E's mileage
Ramsey	Little Canada			111	MN 36 – Stillwater, Minneapolis	Signed as exits 111B (west) and 111A (east)
Ramsey	Maplewood			110B	Roselawn Avenue	
Ramsey	Saint Paul–Maplewood line			110A	CSAH 30 (Larpenteur Avenue) / Wheelock Parkway	
Ramsey	Saint Paul			108	Cayuga Street	
Ramsey	Saint Paul			108	CSAH 33 (Pennsylvania Avenue)	Closed; had no westbound entrance
Ramsey	Saint Paul			107C	University Avenue – State Capitol	Eastbound exit only; access to Regions Hospital
Ramsey	Saint Paul	252.825	406.882	107A 242B	I-35E south / I-94 west (US 12 / US 52 west) / US 52 south / 10th Street / Wacouta Street	Eastern end of I-35E concurrency; western end of I-94/US 52/US 12 concurrency
Ramsey	Saint Paul			243	US 61 north (Mounds Boulevard) / Kellogg Boulevard	Western end of US 61 concurrency, exit numbers uses I-94's mileage
Ramsey	Saint Paul	255.623	411.385	244	I-94 east (US 12 east)	Eastern end of I-94/US 12 concurrency; western end of Alternate I-94
Ramsey	Saint Paul			–	East 3rd Street	Westbound exit and eastbound entrance
Ramsey	Saint Paul				Warner Road / Great River Road (National Route) north	Western end of Great River Road concurrency
Ramsey	Saint Paul			130B	Maxwell Avenue / Bailey Road	Exit numbers use US 61's mileage
Washington	Newport			130A	I-494 / Great River Road (National Route) south	Eastern end of Great River Road concurrency; I-494 exit 63
Washington	Newport			129	Glen Road	
Washington	St. Paul Park			127	CSAH 22 (70th Street) / Summit Avenue	
Washington	Cottage Grove			–	Grange Boulevard / 80th Street	
Washington	Cottage Grove			–	Jamaica Avenue	
Washington	Cottage Grove			–	CSAH 19 / CR 19A (Innovation Road)	Eastern end of freeway
Washington	Denmark Township				MN 95 north (Manning Avenue) – Stillwater	
Washington	Denmark Township	272.297	438.220		US 61 south / Great River Road (National Route) north – Hastings	Eastern end of US 61 concurrency; western end of Great River Road concurrency
Washington	Denmark Township	274.706	442.096		CSAH 21 (St. Croix Scenic Byway)	
St. Croix River		275.473	443.331	Prescott Drawbridge; Minnesota–Wisconsin line		
St. Croix River		275.473	443.331		US 10 east / Alt. I-94 east / Great River Road south – Prescott	Continuation into Wisconsin
1.000 mi = 1.609 km; 1.000 km = 0.621 mi: Closed/former; Concurrency terminus; Incomplete access; Unopened

== See also ==
U.S. Route 10
Previous state: North Dakota	Minnesota	Next state: Wisconsin
