= New York Mills =

New York Mills may refer to a location in the United States:

- New York Mills, Minnesota
- New York Mills, New York
