= Janet Karvonen =

American basketball player

Janet Karvonen was born and raised in New York Mills, Minnesota, where she became a pioneer for girls basketball in Minnesota. Karvonen scored over 3,000 points in her high school career and led New York Mills to state championships in 1977, 1978, and 1979 and a third-place finish in 1980. Karvonen earned a scholarship to play at Old Dominion University, but finished her college career at Louisiana Tech.

== High school career ==
Karvonen guided her high school of New York Mills to three consecutive state championships from 1977 to 1979. She scored 3,129 points in her high school career, a state record that stood until 1997. Janet is best known for her picture perfect jump-shot. She also held many State Tournament records that have since been broken.

== College career ==
Karvonen started her collegiate career Old Dominion University, where she played for two years with 6'8" Anne Donovan. In 1982, she transferred to Louisiana Tech University and sat out the 1982–83 season. She concluded her college career by playing two years for Leon Barmore and the Lady Techsters. Janet made final four appearances with both schools.

== Awards ==
Karvonen was first-team Parade All-America in 1980. She was also inducted into the National High School Sports Hall of Fame in 1989, the Minnesota High School Sports Hall of Fame in 1996, and the Minnesota Coaches' Hall of Fame in 2006.

== Present day ==
Today, Karvonen lives in North Oaks, Minnesota with her husband, Dr. Alan Montgomery, and four children. She is currently in her 22nd year of operating a summer basketball camp for girls all over the Twin Cities metro area. Her camp, for girls ages 6–18, stresses correct basketball fundamentals, but also focuses on teaching life skills. Karvonen used to work for the local television station as an analyst during the high school state basketball tournament.
