= Glyndon Township, Clay County, Minnesota =

Township in Minnesota, United States

Glyndon Township, Minnesota
- Township
- Location of Glyndon Township, within Clay County, Minnesota

- Location within the state of Minnesota Glyndon Township, Minnesota (the United States)
- Coordinates: 46.8411°N 96.6142°W
- Country: United States
- State: Minnesota
- County: Clay

Area
  - Total: 33.729 sq mi (87.358 km^{2})
  - Land: 33.630 sq mi (87.102 km^{2})
  - Water: 0.099 sq mi (0.256 km^{2}) 0.29%
- Elevation: 920 ft (280 m)

Population (2020)
  - Total: 317
  - Estimate (2025): 316
  - Density: 9.43/sq mi (3.64/km^{2})
- Time zone: UTC–6 (Central (CST))
  - Summer (DST): UTC–5 (CDT)
- ZIP Code: 56547
- Area code: 218
- FIPS code: 27-027-24200
- GNIS feature ID: 0664283
- Highways: US 10, I-94, MN 336
- Website: glyndontownship.com

Glyndon Township is a township in Clay County, Minnesota, United States. The population was 317 as of the 2020 census, and was estimated at 316 in 2025.

== History ==
Glyndon Township took its name from Glyndon, Minnesota.

== Geography ==
According to the United States Census Bureau, the township has an area of 33.729 square miles (87.36 km^{2}), of which 33.630 square miles (87.10 km^{2}) is land and 0.099 square miles (0.26 km^{2}) (0.29%) is water.

== Demographics ==
Historical population
Census	Pop.	Note	%±
1890	104		—
1900	243		133.7%
1910	400		64.6%
1920	341		−14.7%
1930	331		−2.9%
1940	363		9.7%
1950	316		−12.9%
1960	295		−6.6%
1970	350		18.6%
1980	299		−14.6%
1990	314		5.0%
2000	281		−10.5%
2010	278		−1.1%
2020	317		14.0%
2025 (est.)	316		−0.3%
Historical Census Data 1890 to 2020; U.S. Decennial Census; 2020 Census

As of the 2024 American Community Survey, there were 96 estimated households in Glyndon Township with an average of 4.95 persons per household. The township has a median household income of $110,000. Approximately 2.9% of the township's population lives at or below the poverty line. Glyndon Township has an estimated 73.4% employment rate, with 31.5% of the population holding a bachelor's degree or higher and 91.5% holding a high school diploma. There were 96 housing units at an average density of 2.85 per square mile (1.10/km^{2}).

The top five reported languages (people were allowed to report up to two languages, thus the figures will generally add to more than 100%) were English (99.3%), Spanish (0.7%), Indo-European (0.0%), Asian and Pacific Islander (0.0%), and Other (0.0%).

The median age in the township was 21.4 years.

=== 2020 census ===
As of the 2020 census, there were 317 people, 106 households, and 85 families residing in the township. The population density was 9.43 inhabitants per square mile (3.64/km^{2}). There were 113 housing units at an average density of 3.36 per square mile (1.30/km^{2}). The racial makeup of the township was 92.43% White, 0.00% African American, 0.95% Native American, 0.00% Asian, 0.00% Pacific Islander, 0.00% from some other races and 6.62% from two or more races. Hispanic or Latino people of any race were 4.73% of the population.

=== 2010 census ===
As of the 2010 census, there were 278 people, 105 households, and 86 families residing in the township. The population density was 8.26 inhabitants per square mile (3.19/km^{2}). There were 109 housing units at an average density of 3.24 per square mile (1.25/km^{2}). The racial makeup of the township was 98.20% White, 0.00% African American, 0.00% Native American, 0.72% Asian, 0.00% Pacific Islander, 0.00% from some other races and 1.08% from two or more races. Hispanic or Latino people of any race were 1.44% of the population.

=== 2000 census ===
As of the 2000 census, there were 281 people, 97 households, and 87 families residing in the township. The population density was 8.35 inhabitants per square mile (3.22/km^{2}). There were 114 housing units at an average density of 3.39 per square mile (1.31/km^{2}). The racial makeup of the township was 95.37% White, 0.00% African American, 1.42% Native American, 1.07% Asian, 0.00% Pacific Islander, 0.00% from some other races and 2.14% from two or more races. Hispanic or Latino people of any race were 1.78% of the population.

There were 97 households, out of which 38.1% had children under the age of 18 living with them, 82.5% were married couples living together, 4.1% had a female householder with no husband present, and 9.3% were non-families. 9.3% of all households were made up of individuals, and 2.1% had someone living alone who was 65 years of age or older. The average household size was 2.90 and the average family size was 3.06.

In the township the population was spread out, with 29.5% under the age of 18, 5.3% from 18 to 24, 28.8% from 25 to 44, 25.6% from 45 to 64, and 10.7% who were 65 years of age or older. The median age was 39 years. For every 100 females, there were 111.3 males. For every 100 females age 18 and over, there were 106.3 males.

The median income for a household in the township was $46,250, and the median income for a family was $53,750. Males had a median income of $36,500 versus $21,250 for females. The per capita income for the township was $21,309. About 2.3% of families and 3.3% of the population were below the poverty line, including none of those under the age of eighteen or sixty-five or over.
