= Skin Wars =

Reality television series (2014–2016)

- Genre: Reality competition
- Presented by: Rebecca Romijn
- Judges: RuPaul Charles; Craig Tracy; Robin Slonina
- Country of origin: United States
- Original language: English
- No. of seasons: 3
- No. of episodes: 28

Production
- Executive producers: Michael Levitt; Jill Goularte
- Producer: Robin Barcus Slonina
- Editor: Jacob McCampbell
- Camera setup: Johna Great
- Production company: Michael Levitt Productions

Original release
- Network: Game Show Network
- Release: August 6, 2014 – August 10, 2016

Skin Wars is an American body painting reality television series hosted by Rebecca Romijn that premiered on the American pay-television channel Game Show Network on August 6, 2014. Contestants on the series perform challenges containing body painting each episode. At the end of each episode, one contestant is eliminated and told "It's time to wash off your canvas."

== Production ==
On September 12, 2013, GSN ordered eight episodes of the series, making it GSN's first television show devoted to body art. On February 4, 2014, GSN announced Rebecca Romijn as host of Skin Wars, with RuPaul Charles, Craig Tracy and Robin Slonina serving as judges.

The series premiered on GSN August 6, 2014. That same night, the network released an online series, Skin Wars: The Naked Truth with Kandee Johnson which began immediately after Skin Wars on DOOR3, GSN's YouTube channel and targeted toward 18- to 25-year-olds. The series features commentary from Johnson as well as highlights from that night's episode and a "Skinterview" with one of the contestants.

On September 30, 2014, GSN announced plans to air a ten-episode second season of Skin Wars with Romijn and all three judges returning to reprise their respective roles. The second season premiered June 10, 2015.

A spinoff, Skin Wars: Fresh Paint hosted by RuPaul, aired as a special on August 26, 2015. It featured six highly accomplished artists, each at the top of their game, as they leave their comfort zones to compete in body painting for the first time. The artists must conquer three difficult challenges as they are mentored by three top artists from the first season, Dutch Bihary, Lawrence "Gear" Duran and Season One champion, Natalie Fletcher. As the artists worked closely with their body painting mentors, they attempted to quickly master the craft and win the $10,000 prize and become champion. It premiered to 456,000 viewers. Later, it became a series itself, premiering on June 15, 2016.

On August 27, 2015, GSN renewed the series for a third season.

The winners of the program in chronological order are as follows: Natalie Fletcher, Lana Chronium and Rick Uribe.

== Series overview ==
=== Season 1 (2014) ===
==== Contestants ====
The 10 body painters competing in the first season were:

Contestant	Age	Home-State	Outcome
Natalie Fletcher	28	Oregon	1st (Winner)
Shannon Holt	38	Pennsylvania	2nd (Runner-up)
Dutch Bihary	41	Washington	3rd Place
Nicole Hays	29	Texas	4th Place
Lawrence "Gear" Duran	35	Nevada	5th Place
Felle Kelsaw	41	Michigan	6th Place
Mythica Von Griffyn	43	Colorado	7th Place
Angela Roberts	22	Louisiana	8th Place
Sean Avram	39	Vermont (originally Canada)	9th Place
Alan Anderson	38	Alabama	10th Place

==== Contestant progress ====
Elimination Chart
Artists	1	2	3	4	5	6	7	8
Natalie	SAFE	WIN	WIN	SAFE	BTM2‡	F/O	BTM2‡	WINNER
Shannon	WIN	SAFE	LOW‡	BTM2‡	HIGH	WIN	HIGH	RUNNER-UP
Dutch	HIGH‡	HIGH	LOW	HIGH	LOW‡	SAFE	WIN	3RD PLACE‡
Nicole	SAFE	SAFE‡	HIGH	LOW	HIGH	HIGH	ELIM	
Gear	SAFE	HIGH	BTM2	HIGH	WIN	ELIM‡		
Felle	HIGH	SAFE	HIGH‡	WIN	ELIM			
Mythica	BTM2	LOW	HIGH	ELIM				
Angela	SAFE	BTM2	ELIM					
Sean	LOW	ELIM						
Alan	ELIM							

The contestant won Skin Wars.
The contestant was the runner-up.
The contestant placed 3rd overall.
The contestant won the weekly challenge.
The contestant placed in the top, but did not win the challenge.
The contestant placed in the bottom, but was not up for elimination.
The contestant placed in the bottom 2 and up for elimination.
The contestant was eliminated.
The contestant went into a face off against another contestant and won.
The contestant was eliminated after a face off against another contestant.
‡ The contestant won the mini challenge

=== Season 2 (2015) ===
==== Contestants ====
The 12 body painters competing in the second season were:

Contestant	Age	Hometown	Outcome
Lana Chromium	29	San Diego, California	Winner
Avi Ram	28	Fort Lauderdale, Florida	Runner-up
Aryn Fox	27	Newport, Kentucky	3rd Place
Cheryl Ann Lipstreu	37	Winston-Salem, North Carolina	4th Place
Rio Sirah	33	Atlanta, Georgia	5th Place
Kyle Vest	25	Orlando, Florida	6th Place
Dawn Marie Svanoe	44	Madison, Wisconsin	7th Place
Sammie Bartko	38	Heber City, Utah	8th Place
Fernello Nelson	30	Queens, New York	9th Place
Rachel Deboer	40	Maui, Hawaii	10th Place
Rudy Zanzibar Campos	30	Houston, Texas	11th Place
Marcio Karam	43	Rio de Janeiro, Brazil	12th Place

==== Contestant progress ====
Elimination Chart
Artists	1	2	3	4	5	6	7	8	9	10
Lana	WIN	SAFE	HIGH	BTM2	BTM2	HIGH‡	WIN	HIGH	F/O	WINNER
Avi	SAFE	WIN	HIGH	HIGH‡	HIGH	WIN	LOW	WIN	WIN	RUNNER-UP‡
Aryn	SAFE	HIGH	SAFE	WIN	HIGH	HIGH	LOW‡	BTM2	HIGH‡	3RD PLACE
Cheryl Ann	HIGH	HIGH‡	LOW	LOW	LOW	SAFE	BTM2	LOW‡	ELIM	
Rio	SAFE	SAFE	WIN‡	LOW	HIGH‡	BTM2	HIGH	ELIM		
Kyle	HIGH	SAFE	HIGH	SAFE	WIN	LOW	ELIM			
Dawn Marie	SAFE	BTM2	LOW	HIGH	LOW	ELIM				
Sammie	SAFE	SAFE	BTM2	SAFE	ELIM					
Fernello	LOW‡	SAFE	SAFE	ELIM						
Rachel	BTM2	LOW	ELIM							
Rudy	SAFE	ELIM								
Marcio	ELIM									

The contestant won Skin Wars.
The contestant was the runner-up.
The contestant placed 3rd overall.
The contestant won the weekly challenge.
The contestant placed in the top, but did not win the challenge.
The contestant placed in the bottom, but was not up for elimination.
The contestant placed in the bottom 2 and up for elimination.
The contestant was eliminated.
The contestant went into a face off against another contestant and won.
The contestant was eliminated after a face off against another contestant.
‡ The contestant won the mini challenge.

=== Season 3 (2016) ===
==== Contestants ====
The 12 body painters competing in the third season were:

Contestant	Age	Hometown	Outcome
Rick Uribe	20	El Paso, Texas	Winner
Alison Kenyon	44	Grass Valley, California	Runner-up
Brittney Pelloquin	28	Broussard, Louisiana	3rd Place
Michael Mejia	25	Queens, New York	4th Place
Tiffany Beckler	26	Rock Hill, South Carolina	5th Place
Luis Martinez	21	Atlanta, Georgia	6th Place
Joseph "Otto" Ott	38	Winneconne, Wisconsin	7th Place
Hans Haveron	36	Los Angeles, California	8th Place (Quit)
Jessica "Jess" Watson Miller	24	Sydney, Australia	9th Place
Kyera Dalesandro	24	Virginia Beach, Virginia	10th Place
Shelley Wapniak	33	Brooklyn, New York	11th Place
Jermaze Wade	36	Decatur, Georgia	12th Place

==== Contestant progress ====
Elimination Chart
Artists	1	2	3	4	5	6	7	8	9	10
Rick	SAFE	WIN	WIN	LOW	HIGH	HIGH	BTM2	HIGH‡	BTM2	WINNER
Alison	SAFE‡	SAFE	BTM2	WIN	HIGH	SAFE	HIGH‡	HIGH	WIN	RUNNER-UP‡
Brittney	HIGH	HIGH	LOW	HIGH	SAFE	HIGH	BTM2	WIN	HIGH‡	3RD PLACE
Michael	HIGH	BTM2	LOW	HIGH‡	WIN	BTM2‡	WIN	BTM2	ELIM	
Tiffany	WIN	SAFE	HIGH	SAFE	SAFE	WIN	HIGH	ELIM		
Luis	SAFE	SAFE	SAFE‡	BTM2	BTM2‡	ELIM				
Otto	SAFE	LOW	HIGH	SAFE	ELIM					
Hans	LOW	HIGH	HIGH	SAFE	QUIT					
Jess	SAFE	SAFE‡	SAFE	ELIM						
Kyera	BTM2	SAFE	ELIM							
Shelley	SAFE	ELIM								
Jermaze	ELIM									

The contestant won Skin Wars.
The contestant was the runner-up.
The contestant placed 3rd overall.
The contestant won the weekly challenge.
The contestant placed in the top, but did not win the challenge.
The contestant was in the bottom 2, but neither was eliminated.
The contestant placed in the bottom, but was not up for elimination.
The contestant placed in the bottom 2 and up for elimination.
The contestant was eliminated.
The contestant quit the competition.
‡ The contestant won the mini challenge.

- In Episode 5, Hans quit the competition at panel after a fall out with the judges.
