= Craig Tracy (artist) =

American body painting artist (born 1967)

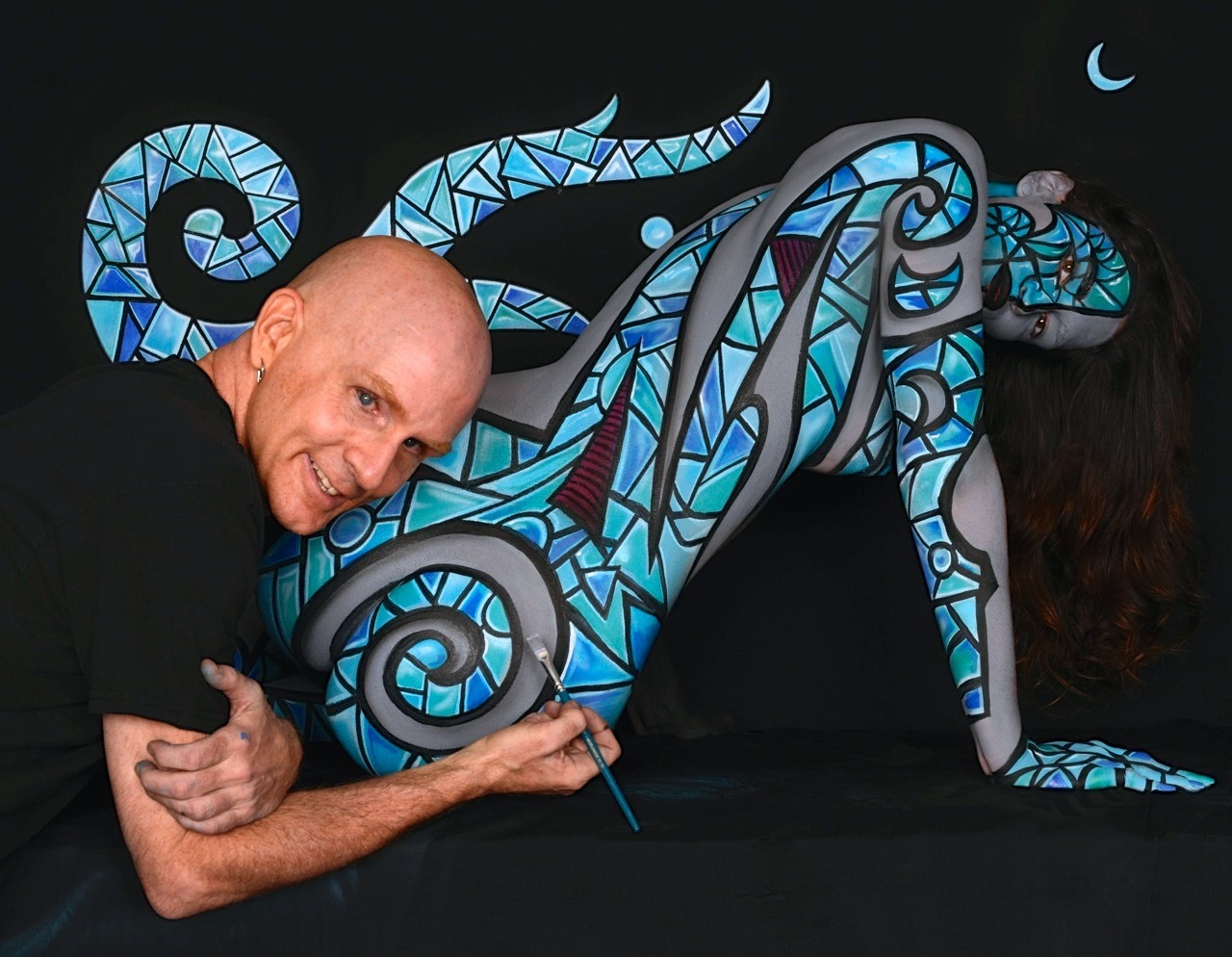
- Craig Tracy in 2014
- Born: May 22, 1967; New Orleans, Louisiana, U.S.
- Education: The Art Institute of Fort Lauderdale
- Known for: Body painting
- Style: Trompe-l'œil
- Website: craigtracy.com

Craig Anthony Tracy (born May 22, 1967) is an American bodypainting artist and television personality based in New Orleans, Louisiana. He is widely known as the expert judge and the producer of Skin Wars, a bodypainting reality competition which aired on the Game Show Network between 2014 and 2016. Tracy is the founder of the Craig Tracy Gallery, previously known as PaintedAlive Gallery, in the French Quarter of New Orleans. Tracy is also the recipient of the World Award in the airbrush category at the World Bodypainting Festival in 2005.

== Biography ==
Tracy was born in 1967 in New Orleans, Louisiana. He started painting at the age of 15 when he received his first airbrush from his parents. Tracy attended The Art Institute of Fort Lauderdale where he graduated in 1987. After graduating, Tracy started his professional career as a freelance illustrator creating industrial and commercial imagery. He retired from illustrating in 1993 and began focusing on the art of bodypainting.

In the mid-2000s, Tracy exhibited his artworks in The Nature Series, his first series of bodypainting images. The series received positive reviews from several art critics and led him to travel to Europe to work with other professional bodypainters. In 2005, Tracy exhibited his bodypainting artworks at the World Bodypainting Festival, the biggest annual event in bodypainting culture, in Klagenfurt, Austria. He was named a 2005 World Bodypainting Champion in the airbrush category.

In February 2006, Tracy established the PaintedAlive Gallery, the first gallery in the world dedicated to the fine art of bodypainting. In 2009, the gallery was renamed to the Craig Tracy Gallery to better clarify that it houses and sells his personal works. It is located in the French Quarter of New Orleans.

Tracy has also served as the judge, producer and the Bodypainting Guru of Skin Wars since it began airing in 2014. In three seasons of the network reality television competition series, Tracy worked alongside RuPaul, Robin Barcus Slonina and the host Rebecca Romjin. He has also judged the U.S. bodypainting competition Living Art America and helped organize the New York Bodypainting day. His work has been commissioned for numerous companies including the New Orleans Saints, Fiat and Coca-Cola. Additionally, he and his work have been featured books including Ripley’s Believe It or Not!: Strikingly True, The Human Canvas: The World’s Best Bodypaintings as well as his self-authored Painted Alive: The Fine Art of Bodypainting.

== Art ==
Tracy's artworks relate to techniques of combining traditional paintbrushing and finger-painting with modern airbrushing. The majority of his art is the result of the combination of bodypainting and imagery with minimal digital influences. His compositions are inspired by a specific body shape combined with cultural and natural influences. Many of Tracy's artworks includes manual creation of backdrop which complements the required visual. An amalgamation of the bodypainting and the backdrop are photographed simultaneously in order to minimize the need of intertwining the artwork. In an interview, Tracy suggested that the artists like Norman Rockwell, M.C. Escher, Boris Vallejo, Chuck Close, Robert Mapplethorpe, H.R. Giger and Gottfried Helnwein have been an inspiration to his artworks. Tracy's work represents surreal moment captured in the artwork which makes the viewers question the visual reality.
