= Finn Creek Museum =

Finnish-American open-air museum

Coordinates: 46.454549°N 95.332163°W

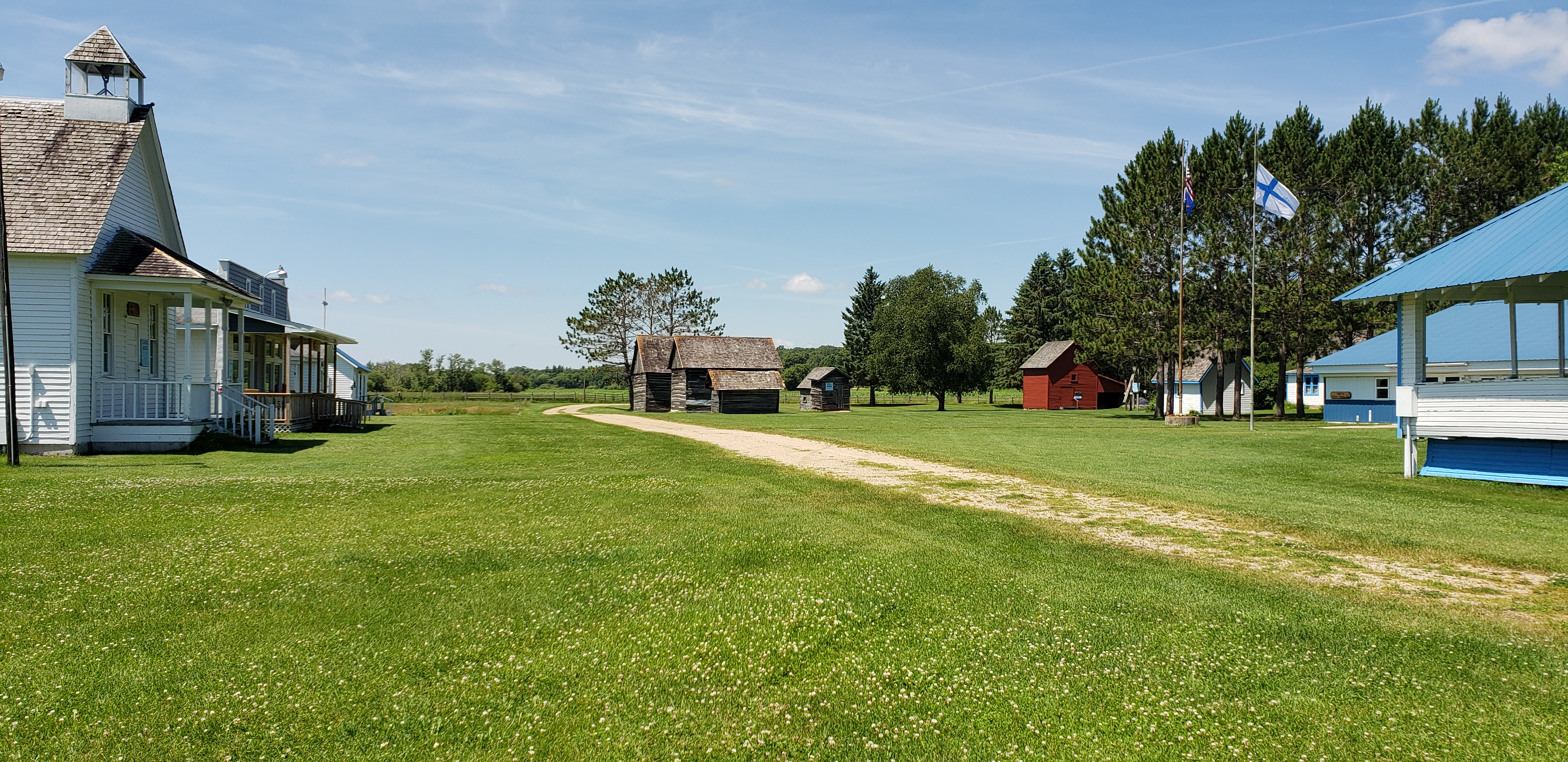
Part of the Finn Creek Museum grounds

Finn Creek Open Air Museum is a Finnish-American open-air museum. It is approximately six miles (10 km) southeast of New York Mills, Minnesota. The museum documents the early Finnish immigrants' lifestyles and experiences in the New York Mills area. The museum hosts an annual festival in late August that highlights music, food, and entertainment that reflects the Finnish-American experience.

== History ==
In 1900, a Finnish family by the name of Siifert and Wilhelmiina Tapio purchased the present Finn Creek acreage from Herman Arola and the St. Paul Railway Co. The price per acre was about $3, and they purchased 80 acres (32 ha). Construction of the Tapios' house began immediately, and the family moved into their new home in 1901. The Tapio family lived and farmed the land in the late 19th century. They had nine children, five of whom lived to be adults (Sylvester, Maimie, Hilma, Hilda, Helga, Tecia, Ida, Sadie, Kalle). Kalle Tapio died at age 3, leaving Sylvester Tapio as the only son.

In 1975, the State Finnish American Historical Society purchased one acre of land at Finn Creek. Another nine acres (3.6 ha) were purchased since that time through grants, local funding, and promotions. The land was purchased from an individual landowner in 1975. Only the Tapios had lived on the land. The buildings on the site were restored reminiscent of the late 19th century to the early 20th century.

== Mission and purpose ==
Currently volunteers work to maintain the buildings, and create an environment for preserving the Finnish-American history. The museum is also interested in staying current with Finland today and looking into the future.

== Festival ==
Demonstrations at the festival include: Sawmilling, threshing, rug weaving. Entertainment at the festival has included: The Upper Mississippians Swing Orchestra, Kip Peltoniemi Finnish foods at the festival include: karjalan piirakka, lusikkaleivat.

== Finn Creek Store ==
The Finn Creek Store (also known as the Heinola Store) also specializes in Marimekko textiles, Iittala glass, sauna supplies, and other Finnish products.
