= Keith Langseth =

American politician (born 1938)

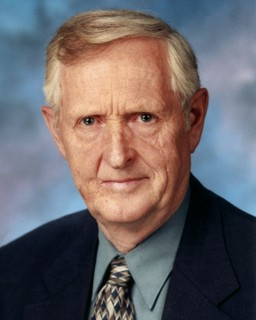

Member of the Minnesota Senate from the 9th district
- In office January 6, 1981 – January 7, 2013
- Preceded by: Doug Sillers
- Succeeded by: Paul Gazelka

Member of the Minnesota House of Representatives from the 9B district
- In office 1975–1979
- Preceded by: Arlan Stangeland
- Succeeded by: Merlyn O. Valan

Personal details
- Born: January 20, 1938 (age 88) Glyndon, Minnesota
- Party: Democratic–Farmer–Labor Party
- Spouse: Lorraine Langseth
- Children: 3
- Occupation: Farmer, legislator

Keith Langseth (born January 20, 1938) is a Democratic–Farmer–Labor Party politician and former member of the Minnesota Senate, representing District 9 since 1981 until 2013. Prior to his election to the Senate, he was a member of the Minnesota House of Representatives from District 9B from 1975 to 1979. He served a combined 36 years in the Legislature. His district included portions of Becker, Clay, Otter Tail, Traverse and Wilkin counties in the northwestern part of the state.

== Personal life ==
Langseth grew up in Glyndon, where he still resides. He graduated from Glyndon High School in 1956 and began working as a dairy farmer. He continued farming throughout his tenure in the legislature. He and his wife, Lorraine, have three children: Dan, Joy and Gayle.

== Political career ==
Langseth first became involved in the DFL as a result of his opposition to the Vietnam War. He was asked by the local DFL Party to run for the House of Representatives in 1974, later choosing to run for the Senate in 1980. He ran against and defeated an incumbent in both elections.

Langseth served as Chair of the Capital Investment Committee, a position he held since its creation in 2001. He was also a member of the Taxes, Agriculture and Veterans, Agriculture and Veterans Budget and Policy Division, Transportation, Transportation Budget and Policy Division, and Rules and Administration committees. His stated legislative concerns included bonding, tax policy, transportation, education and agriculture.

Langseth announced his retirement from politics and did not run for re-election in 2012.

== Electoral history ==
- Minnesota Senate District 9 Election 2010
  - Keith Langseth (D) 14,595 votes, 52.52%
  - Jeff Backer (R), 13,168 votes, 47.39%
  - Write In, 25 votes, 0.09%
- Minnesota Senate District 9 Election 2006
  - Keith Langseth (D) 20,353 votes, 69.8%
  - Paul Holle (R), 8,771 votes, 30.1%
  - Write In, 33 votes, 0.1%
- Minnesota Senate District 9 Election 2002
  - Keith Langseth (D) 18,587 votes, 61.22%
  - Bradley Monson (R), 10,144 votes, 33.41%
  - Dan Stewart (IP), 1,278 votes, 4.21%
- Minnesota Senate District 9 Election 2000
  - Keith Langseth (D) 19,412 votes, 61.05%
  - Wallace "Wally" Nord (R), 10,946 votes, 34.43%
- Minnesota Senate District 9 Election 1996
  - Keith Langseth (D) 17,189 votes, 58.67%
  - Cliff Dyrud (R), 11,235 votes, 38.35%
- Minnesota Senate District 9 Election 1992
  - Keith Langseth (D) 18,954 votes, 59.68%
  - Bob Friederichs (IR), 11,587 votes, 36.48%
- Minnesota Senate District 9 Election 1990
  - Keith Langseth (D) 13,705 votes, 61.80%
  - Robert Westfall (IR) 7,716 votes, 34.79%
- Minnesota Senate District 9 Election 1986
  - Keith Langseth (D) 11,166 votes, 57.96%
  - David Green (IR) 8,099 votes, 42.04%
- Minnesota Senate District 9 Election 1982
  - Keith Langseth (D) 11,733 votes, 50.62%
  - Phyllis Thysell (IR) 10,803 votes, 46.61%
- Minnesota Senate District 9 Election 1980
  - Keith Langseth (D) 13,776 votes, 52.9%
  - D.H. (Doug) Sillers (Incumbent) (IR) 12,245 votes, 47.1%
- Minnesota House District 9B Election 1978
  - Keith Langseth (D) 5,743 votes, 49.9%
  - Merlyn Valan (IR) 5,758 votes, 50.1%
- Minnesota House District 9B Election 1976
  - Keith Langseth (D) 8,498 votes, 62.8%
  - Lee Johnson (IR) 4,664 votes, 37.2%
- Minnesota House District 9B Election 1974
  - Keith Langseth (D) 5,361 votes, 58.94%
  - Arian Strangeland (Incumbent) (IR) 3,735 votes, 41.06%

Political offices
Preceded by D.H. Sillers	Minnesota Senate District 9; 1981 – January 7, 2013	Succeeded by district redrawn
