= Laura Redden Searing =

American journalist

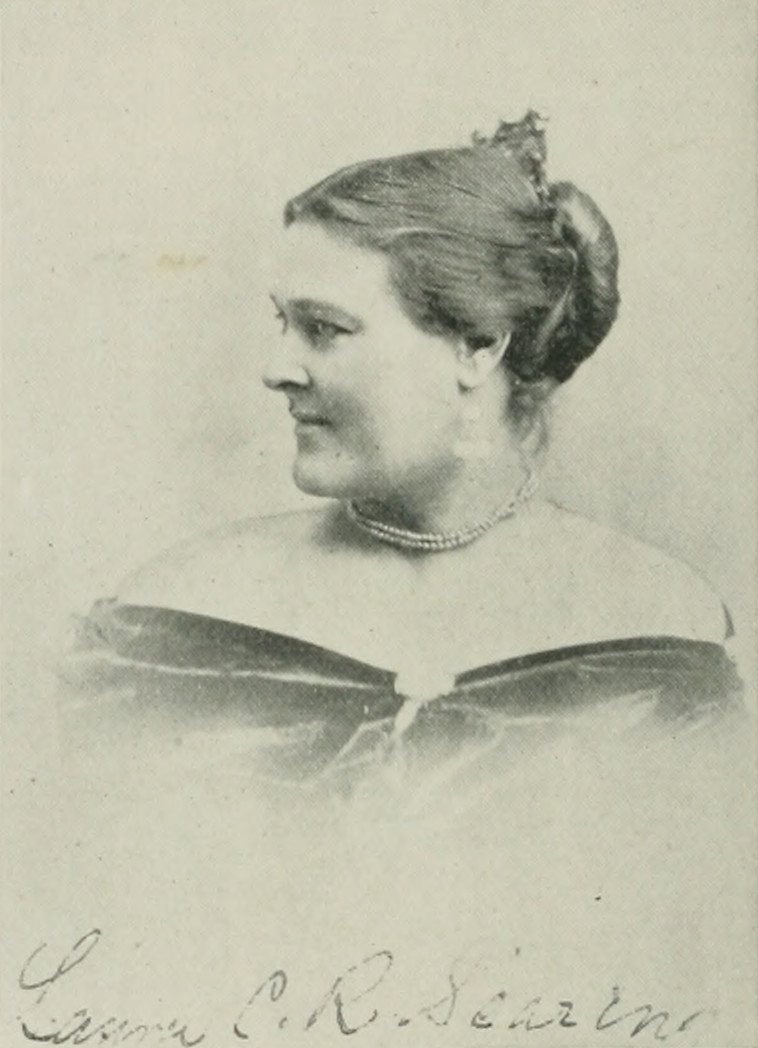
- Born: February 9, 1839; Somerset County, Maryland, United States
- Died: August 10, 1923 (aged 84); San Mateo County, California, United States
- Writing career
- Pen name: Howard Glyndon
- Period: 19th century
- Genres: journalism, poetry

Laura Redden Searing (born February 9, 1839, in Somerset County, Maryland) was an American deaf poet and journalist. Her first book of poetry published was Idyls of Battle, and Poems of the Rebellion (1864). She also wrote under the male pseudonym Howard Glyndon. Significantly, the town of Glyndon, Minnesota was founded in 1872 and named in honor of the writer.

== Early years ==
Laura Catherine Redden was born to Littleton John Redden and Wilhelmina Waller Redden in 1839. In 1851, she lost her hearing at age 11 due to the illness spinal meningitis. Her supportive parents learned sign language so they could communicate with her. In 1855, she enrolled in the Missouri School for the Deaf (MSD) in Fulton, Missouri. She learned sign language and the American Manual Alphabet.

== Personal life ==
Laura Catherine Redden graduated from the Missouri School for the Deaf, a secondary school, in 1858. She did not enroll in college. Her literary skills and unmarried status made it acceptable at the time for her to enroll at certain colleges. However, there were no colleges that accepted deaf women. The National Deaf-Mute College (now Gallaudet University) was established in 1864 and did not admit female students until 1881. To supplement her education, she toured Europe from 1865 to 1869. While there, she studied German, French, Spanish, and Italian. She became engaged to Michael George Brennan in 1867, but the engagement ended shortly after. Laura Catherine Redden married Edward Whelan Searing, a lawyer, in 1876, to become Laura Catherine Redden Searing. They had one child, Elsa Waller Searing, on May 4, 1880. In 1887, Laura Redden Searing and her daughter settled near Santa Cruz, California. Edward Searing stayed in New York and they divorced in 1894. Redden Searing died in 1923 and was buried in Colma, California.

== Professional career ==
"The snow is falling abroad,
Over meadow and moor;
Drifting silently, high and white,
O'er the sill of our cottage door.

It falls on a lonely grave
Lying away to the West,
Where a hero heart is mouldering away,--
The heart that loved me best!"

— Howard Glyndon (Laura Redden Searing), "The Snow In October", from The Idyls of Battle, reprinted in Sweet Bells Jangled by Judy Yaeger Jones & Jane E. Vallier.

From 1857 to 1858, Redden submitted poems to Harper's Magazine. In 1858, Redden's first published essay appeared in the American Annals of the Deaf. The topics of the essay were deafness, sign language, and writing. In 1858, Redden graduated from the Missouri School for the Deaf. Upon graduation, she was offered a teaching position at MSD which she declined. In 1859, the St. Louis Presbyterian hired her as a columnist and assistant editor. In 1860, she became an editorialist for the St. Louis Republican. At this time, Laura Catherine Redden officially adopted the pseudonym Howard Glyndon. In 1861, she was sent by the St. Louis Republican to Washington D.C. to cover and document the American Civil War. She also wrote for the US Department of Agriculture on citrus cultivation. She was a pro-Union loyalist and wrote poems about the experiences and human interests of the battlefield. She also wrote to Abraham Lincoln and Ulysses S. Grant during the war. After the war, 1865–69, she traveled to Europe to become a correspondent for The New York Times. By 1870, she returned to New York and Boston and was a staff writer for the New York Evening Mail and contributed to Galaxy, Harper's Magazine, and the Tribune.

== Background of "Howard Glyndon" ==
Some speculate Laura Redden Searing used the pen name Howard Glyndon due to the gender biased national attention given to male writers of the time. The name was officially adopted during the American Civil War as a correspondent for the St. Louis Republican. This brings up the possibility that the pen name disassociated her identity from critics to her Union Army sympathies. However, in all of her published works, the pseudonym was accompanied by her real name in smaller letters. This indicates that the pseudonym was not to conceal her gender or identity. It is likely that the double identity was to defy the expectations of what a female writer of that era could produce.

== Bibliography ==
- (1862) Notable men in the House: A series of sketches of prominent men in the House of Representatives, Members of the Thirty-Seventh Congress
- (1864) Idyls of Battle and Poems of the Rebellion
- (1869) A Little Boy's Story
- (1874) Sounds from Secret Chambers
- (1878) Echoes of Other Days
- (1897) Of El Dorado

== Books ==
- Glyndon, Howard (Laura C. Redden) (1864). Idyls of Battle and Poems of the Rebellion. New York: Hurd and Houghton.
- Glyndon, Howard; Judy Yaeger Jones; Jane E. Vallier (2003). Sweet Bells Jangled. Washington D.C.: Gallaudet University Press. ISBN 1-56368-138-2.
- Krentz, Christopher (2000). A Mighty Change. Washington D.C.: Gallaudet University Press. ISBN 1-56368-101-3.
- Lang, Harry; Bonnie Meath-Lang (1995). Deaf Persons in the Arts and Sciences: A Biographical Dictionary. Greenwood Press. ISBN 0-313-29170-5.
