= Inman Township, Otter Tail County, Minnesota =

Inman Township, Minnesota
- Township
- Location of Inman Township, within Otter Tail County, Minnesota

- Location within the state of Minnesota Inman Township, Minnesota (the United States)
- Coordinates: 46°19′7″N 95°19′36″W
- Country: United States
- State: Minnesota
- County: Otter Tail

Area
  - Total: 36.6 sq mi (94.7 km^{2})
  - Land: 36.6 sq mi (94.7 km^{2})
  - Water: 0 sq mi (0.0 km^{2})
- Elevation: 1,453 ft (443 m)

Population (2020)
  - Total: 293
  - Density: 8.01/sq mi (3.09/km^{2})
- Time zone: UTC-6 (Central (CST))
  - Summer (DST): UTC-5 (CDT)
- FIPS code: 27-31004
- GNIS feature ID: 0664547

Inman Township is a township in Otter Tail County, Minnesota, United States. The population was 293 at the 2020 census.

Inman Township was organized in 1878, and named for Thomas Inman, an early settler.

== Geography ==
According to the United States Census Bureau, the township has a total area of 36.6 square miles (95 km^{2}), all land.

== Demographics ==
As of the census of 2000, there were 352 people, 117 households, and 91 families living in the township. The population density was 9.6 inhabitants per square mile (3.7/km^{2}). There were 133 housing units at an average density of 3.6 per square mile (1.4/km^{2}). The racial makeup of the township was 97.73% White, 0.85% from other races, and 1.42% from two or more races. Hispanic or Latino of any race were 3.12% of the population.

There were 117 households, out of which 43.6% had children under the age of 18 living with them, 71.8% were married couples living together, 6.0% had a female householder with no husband present, and 22.2% were non-families. 17.1% of all households were made up of individuals, and 9.4% had someone living alone who was 65 years of age or older. The average household size was 3.01 and the average family size was 3.44.

In the township the population was spread out, with 36.4% under the age of 18, 5.7% from 18 to 24, 24.7% from 25 to 44, 20.5% from 45 to 64, and 12.8% who were 65 years of age or older. The median age was 33 years. For every 100 females, there were 91.3 males. For every 100 females age 18 and over, there were 105.5 males.

The median income for a household in the township was $26,250, and the median income for a family was $26,375. Males had a median income of $22,500 versus $20,000 for females. The per capita income for the township was $12,351. About 20.4% of families and 20.0% of the population were below the poverty line, including 25.9% of those under age 18 and 19.7% of those age 65 or over.
