= Deer Creek, Minnesota =

City in Minnesota, United States

Deer Creek
- City
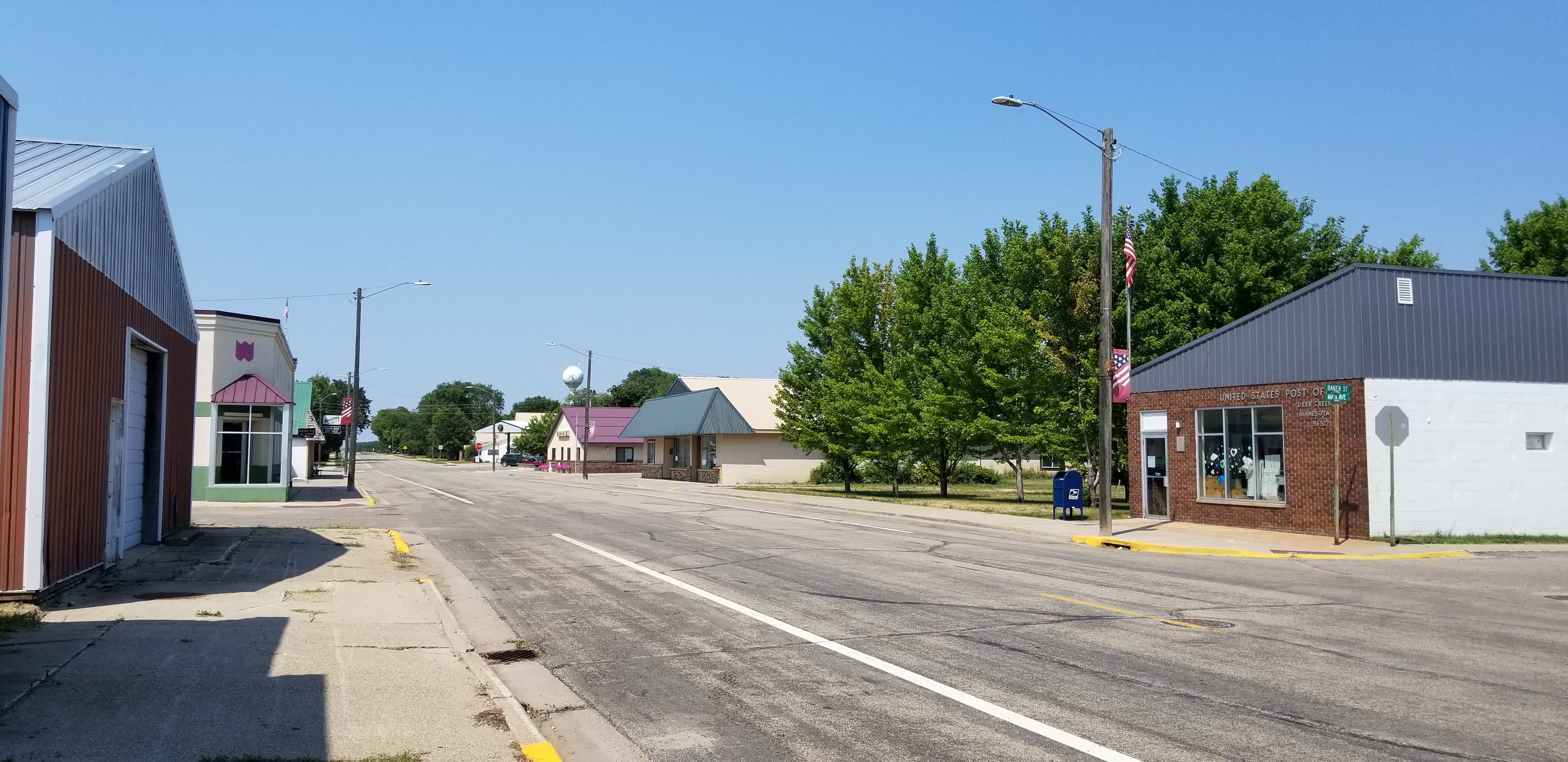
- Buildings on Deer Creek's Main Avenue (County Highway 50)

- Location of Deer Creek, Minnesota
- Coordinates: 46°23′27″N 95°19′18″W
- Country: United States
- State: Minnesota
- County: Otter Tail

Area
  - Total: 4.03 sq mi (10.43 km^{2})
  - Land: 4.01 sq mi (10.38 km^{2})
  - Water: 0.015 sq mi (0.04 km^{2})
- Elevation: 1,394 ft (425 m)

Population (2020)
  - Total: 330
  - Estimate (2021): 332
  - Density: 82.3/sq mi (31.79/km^{2})
- Time zone: UTC-6 (CST)
  - Summer (DST): UTC-5 (CDT)
- ZIP code: 56527
- Area code: 218
- FIPS code: 27-15184
- GNIS feature ID: 2394488
- Website: cityofdeercreek.com

Deer Creek is a city in Otter Tail County, Minnesota, United States. The population was 330 at the 2020 census.

== History ==
Deer Creek was platted in 1882, and named after the nearby Deer Creek.

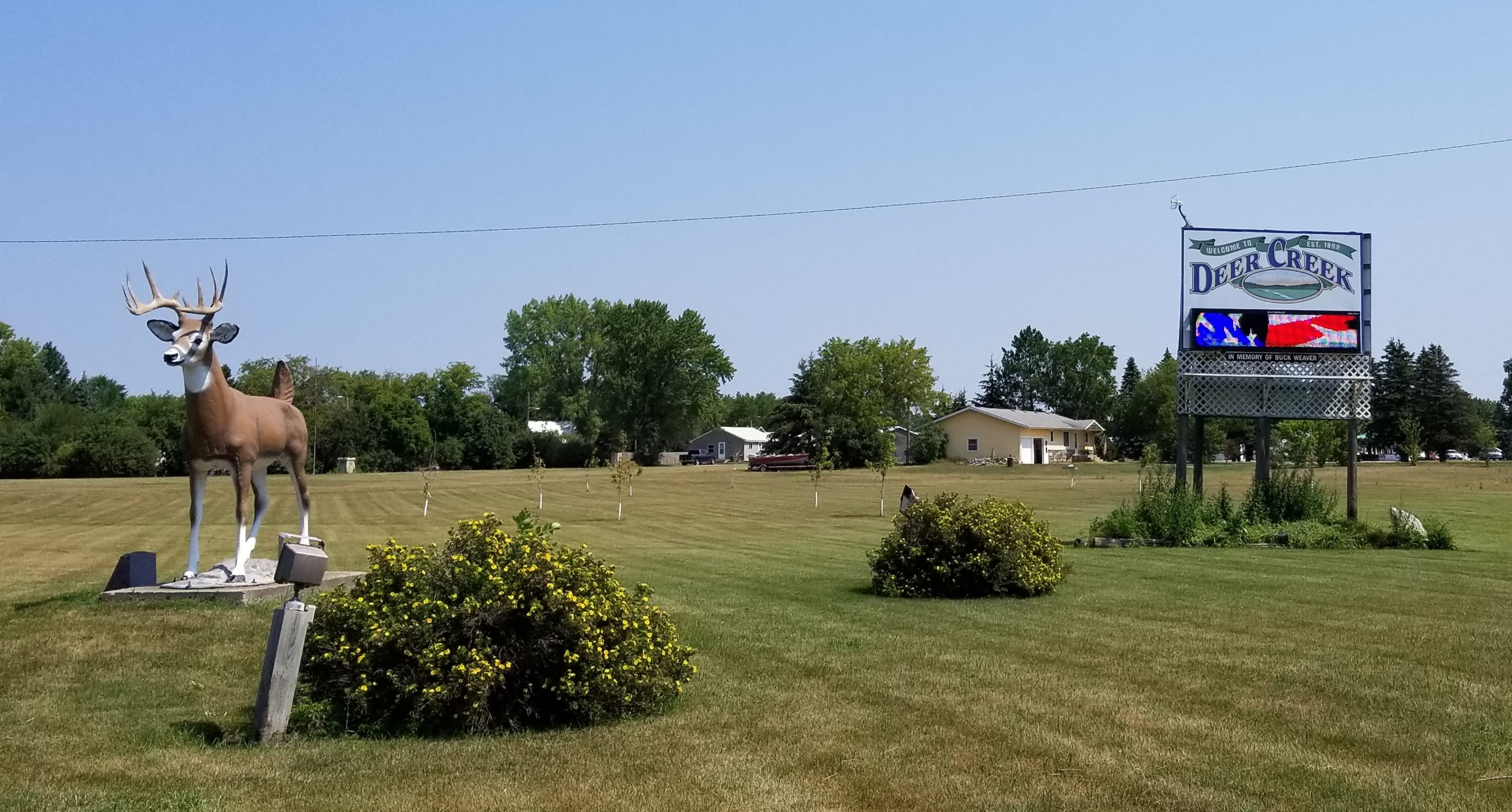
Sign welcoming visitors to Deer Creek.

== Geography ==
According to the United States Census Bureau, the city has a total area of 4.03 square miles (10.44 km^{2}), of which 4.01 square miles (10.39 km^{2}) is land and 0.02 square miles (0.05 km^{2}) is water.

Minnesota State Highways 29 and 106 are two of the main routes in the community.

== Demographics ==
Historical population
Census	Pop.	Note	%±
1900	275		—
1910	313		13.8%
1920	381		21.7%
1930	337		−11.5%
1940	405		20.2%
1950	349		−13.8%
1960	312		−10.6%
1970	287		−8.0%
1980	392		36.6%
1990	303		−22.7%
2000	328		8.3%
2010	322		−1.8%
2020	330		2.5%
2021 (est.)	332		0.6%
U.S. Decennial Census; 2020 Census

=== 2010 census ===
As of the census of 2010, there were 322 people, 147 households, and 91 families living in the city. The population density was 80.3 inhabitants per square mile (31.0/km^{2}). There were 161 housing units at an average density of 40.1 per square mile (15.5/km^{2}). The racial makeup of the city was 98.4% White, 0.9% Native American, and 0.6% from two or more races. Hispanic or Latino of any race were 0.6% of the population.

There were 147 households, of which 25.9% had children under the age of 18 living with them, 47.6% were married couples living together, 7.5% had a female householder with no husband present, 6.8% had a male householder with no wife present, and 38.1% were non-families. 32.0% of all households were made up of individuals, and 9.5% had someone living alone who was 65 years of age or older. The average household size was 2.19 and the average family size was 2.71.

The median age in the city was 44.3 years. 19.9% of residents were under the age of 18; 9.6% were between the ages of 18 and 24; 21.4% were from 25 to 44; 27.6% were from 45 to 64; and 21.4% were 65 years of age or older. The gender makeup of the city was 51.9% male and 48.1% female.

=== 2000 census ===
As of the census of 2000, there were 328 people, 143 households, and 94 families living in the city. The population density was 81.6 inhabitants per square mile (31.5/km^{2}). There were 163 housing units at an average density of 40.6 per square mile (15.7/km^{2}). The racial makeup of the city was 97.56% White, 0.30% African American, 1.22% Native American, 0.30% from other races, and 0.61% from two or more races. Hispanic or Latino of any race were 0.30% of the population.

There were 143 households, out of which 27.3% had children under the age of 18 living with them, 55.2% were married couples living together, 7.7% had a female householder with no husband present, and 33.6% were non-families. 29.4% of all households were made up of individuals, and 16.1% had someone living alone who was 65 years of age or older. The average household size was 2.29 and the average family size was 2.81.

In the city, the population was spread out, with 26.2% under the age of 18, 5.5% from 18 to 24, 23.2% from 25 to 44, 26.8% from 45 to 64, and 18.3% who were 65 years of age or older. The median age was 41 years. For every 100 females, there were 103.7 males. For every 100 females age 18 and over, there were 95.2 males.

The median income for a household in the city was $28,558, and the median income for a family was $37,656. Males had a median income of $28,438 versus $18,750 for females. The per capita income for the city was $14,097. About 2.4% of families and 8.7% of the population were below the poverty line, including none of those under age 18 and 23.6% of those age 65 or over.
