= Little Falls Township, Morrison County, Minnesota =

Little Falls Township, Minnesota
- Township
- Location within the state of Minnesota Little Falls Township, Minnesota (the United States)
- Coordinates: 45°57′12″N 94°19′3″W
- Country: United States
- State: Minnesota
- County: Morrison

Area
  - Total: 36.3 sq mi (94.1 km^{2})
  - Land: 34.7 sq mi (89.8 km^{2})
  - Water: 1.7 sq mi (4.3 km^{2})
- Elevation: 1,220 ft (372 m)

Population (2000)
  - Total: 1,624
  - Density: 47/sq mi (18.1/km^{2})
- Time zone: UTC-6 (Central (CST))
  - Summer (DST): UTC-5 (CDT)
- ZIP code: 56345
- Area code: 320
- FIPS code: 27-37574
- GNIS feature ID: 0664802
- Website: https://www.littlefallstwpmn.gov/

Little Falls Township is a township in Morrison County, Minnesota, United States. The population was 1,624 at the 2000 census.

== Geography ==
According to the United States Census Bureau, the township has a total area of 36.3 square miles (94 km^{2}), of which 34.7 square miles (90 km^{2}) is land and 1.6 square miles (4.1 km^{2}) (4.54%) is water.

It lies to the east of the Mississippi River.

== Demographics ==
As of the census of 2000, there were 1,624 people, 533 households, and 459 families residing in the township. The population density was 46.8 inhabitants per square mile (18.1/km^{2}). There were 546 housing units at an average density of 15.7 per square mile (6.1/km^{2}). The racial makeup of the township was 98.77% White, 0.12% African American, 0.18% Native American, 0.12% Asian, 0.18% from other races, and 0.62% from two or more races. Hispanic or Latino of any race were 0.62% of the population.

There were 533 households, out of which 42.0% had children under the age of 18 living with them, 78.2% were married couples living together, 5.3% had a female householder with no husband present, and 13.7% were non-families. 10.7% of all households were made up of individuals, and 3.2% had someone living alone who was 65 years of age or older. The average household size was 3.02 and the average family size was 3.23.

In the township the population was spread out, with 30.9% under the age of 18, 7.0% from 18 to 24, 29.6% from 25 to 44, 23.4% from 45 to 64, and 9.1% who were 65 years of age or older. The median age was 36 years. For every 100 females, there were 109.5 males. For every 100 females age 18 and over, there were 107.8 males.

The median income for a household in the township was $56,196, and the median income for a family was $60,250. Males had a median income of $35,000 versus $25,688 for females. The per capita income for the township was $22,083. About 2.1% of families and 2.5% of the population were below the poverty line, including 1.9% of those under age 18 and 4.7% of those age 65 or over.
