= Robin Barcus Slonina =

American artist

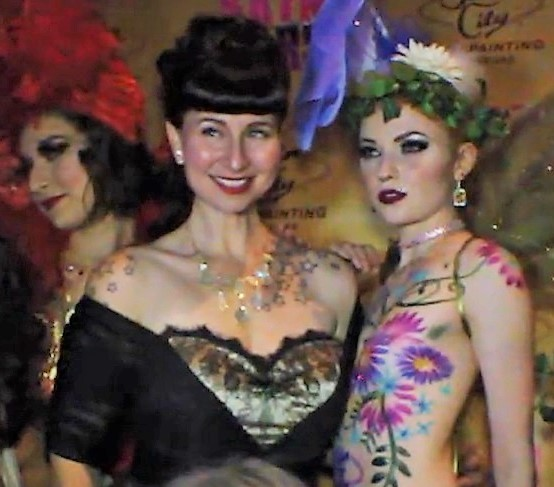
Slonina (center) with body painted models in 2017.

Robin Slonina (née Barcus, born April 19,1974) is a multi-disciplinary, contemporary artist.

== Biography ==
Slonina grew up in the Chicago area and received her Bachelor of Fine Arts from the School of the Art Institute of Chicago in 1993. She married Jim Slonina in 2007.

== Career ==
Slonina's work has been exhibited at the Evanston Arts Center in Evanston, Illinois; the John Michael Kohler Arts Center in Sheboygan, Wisconsin; Compton Verney Art Museum in Warwickshire, England; the Smart Museum of Art, The Peace Museum, The Contemporary Arts Workshop, and Artemisia Gallery in Chicago, Illinois; New York Mills Cultural Center in New York Mills, Minnesota; Atomic Todd Gallery in Las Vegas, Nevada as well as many other galleries and museums. In 2006, she opened Skin City Body Painting in Las Vegas, Nevada, which provides professional body paint, makeup, and hair styling to customers. The company specializes in models, entertainers, and acrobatic talent for promotions, events, conventions, and parties.

== Television ==
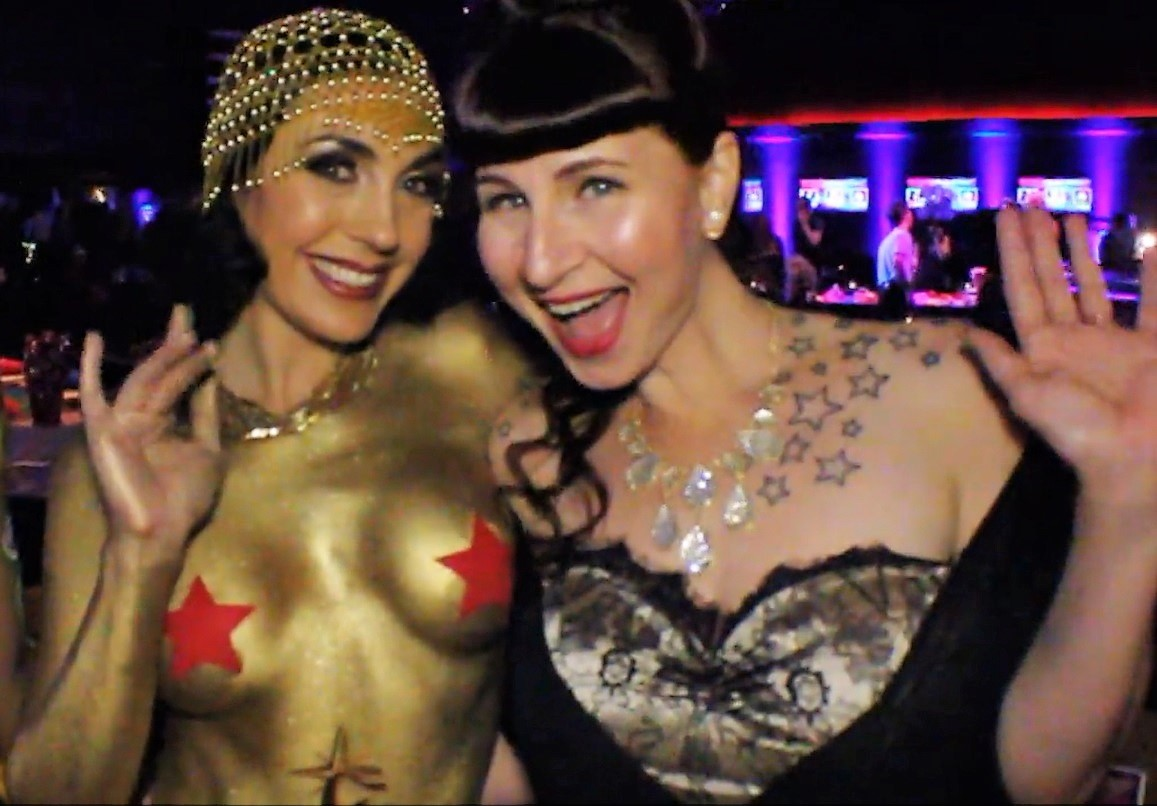
Slonina (right) with body painted model in 2017.

Slonina, along with RuPaul, and Craig Tracy, serves as a judge on Skin Wars, a body painting reality competition hosted by Rebecca Romijn that began airing on GSN in August 2014. Contestants on the series perform challenges containing body painting each episode. At the end of each episode, one contestant is eliminated.

== States of Dress Project ==
In 2005, Slonina started the "States of Dress" project, a series of interactive, site-specific dress sculptures. The project largely incorporated materials indigenous to the respective US state.

- Illinois - "Red Dress" 1999. Dress made from 28 used dresses. 25' long and 18' wide at base. Northbrook, IL.
- Minnesota - "Corn Dress" 2004. Welded steel frame and corn. 14' tall. New York Mills, MN.
- Iowa - "Prairie Grass Dress" 2005. Life-size wire frame and prairie grass. Toddville, IA.
- Wisconsin - "White Pine Dress" 2005. Wire frame, white pine branches, ladder. 10' tall. Seely, WI
- Wyoming - "Willow Creek Dress" 2006. Woven willow branches floated on Lower Piney Creek. 15' long. Banner, WY.
- Maine - "Pinecone Dress" 2006. Wire frame and pine cones. 8' tall. Westport Island, ME.
- Nevada - "Casino Chip Dress" 2008. Casino chips and zip ties. Boulder City, NV.

== Press ==
- "Robin Slonina draws on her Chicago work ethic to take the Vegas art scene to a higher level" by Bob Chiarito, May 10, 2016. The Chicago Ambassador
- "Robin Slonina of 'Skin Wars': 'I knew that everybody would fall in love with bodypainting'" by Robin Leach, April 19, 2016. Las Vegas Sun
- "Las Vegas artist Slonina has skin in the game show" by Christopher Lawrence, April 13, 2016. Las Vegas Review-Journal
- "Body Painter Robin Slonina Shifts to Canvas" by Jessie O’Brien, January 6, 2016. DTLV
- "Body of work: Artist Robin Slonina" by Buford Davis, January 2, 2016. Inside Henderson
- "Expanding the Canvas" by Erin Ryan, December 31, 2015. Las Vegas Weekly
- "Weekly Q&A: Robin Slonina on ephemeral art, dirty charades and 'Skin Wars'" by Leslie Ventura, June 10, 2015. Las Vegas Weekly
- "Almost Naked: Skin City strips to celebrate equality and diversity" by Kristen Peterson, May 13, 2015. Las Vegas Weekly
- "Seven Questions for Skin Wars’ Robin Slonina" by Geoff Carter, September 2, 2014. Vegas Seven
- "Body painting like you’ve never seen it before" by Catherine Conelly, August 6, 2014. SheKnows Media
- "Chicago’s ‘Skin Wars’ Judge Thrilled To Star With RuPaul, Rebecca Romijn" by Justin Breen, August 5, 2014. DNAinfo
- "'Skin Wars': Las Vegas Entrepreneur Talks Body Paint, RuPaul and Reality TV" by Kristen Peterson, July 31, 2014. Las Vegas Weekly
- "Las Vegas artist passionate about 'Skin Wars'" by Christopher Lawrence, July 30, 2014. Las Vegas Review-Journal
- "Dress Sculptures Made of Unusual Materials by Robin Barcus Slonina" by EDW Lynch, July 29, 2014. Laughing Squid
- "The Garbage Dress" by John Farrier, July 29, 2014. Neatorama
- “Couture Clothing Right Out of the Bins” by Beth Schwartz, June 2008. Polished Magazine Las Vegas, NV
- "Look: The sponge dress, and other delights" by Greg Thilmont, April 29, 2008. Las Vegas Weekly
- “Robin Barcus: State of Dress” by Miguel Cortez, Fall, 2005. Polvo Magazine Chicago, IL
- “The Great Dress–scape” by Leah Petrusiak, May 5, 2005. Time Out Chicago Magazine Chicago, IL
- “Corn Dress” September 26, 2004. ABC News Alexandria, MN.
- “They will Come: Chicago Artist Creates Art in Corn Field” September 23, 2004. The Daily Journal Fergus Falls, MN.
- “The Perham Show” Visiting Artist Feature September 9, 2004. Channel 3 News Perham, MN
- “Window Art” September 5, 2004. ABC News Chicago, IL
- “Five Shows to See Now” July 8, 1999 New City Chicago, IL
- “Art Attack” Jan / Feb issue, 1999. UR Magazine Chicago, IL
- “Robin Barcus – Multi-Disciplinary Artist” Fall / Winter issue, 1998. In the Loop Magazine Chicago, IL
- “Windows Mural Project” August, 1998. WGN-TV News Chicago, IL
- “Field Trip: Outdoor Sculpture Exhibition is a Natural for Art Lovers” March 13, 1998. The Dallas Morning News Dallas, TX
- “Test Site” Exhibition Review Dec / Jan issue, 1998. Gravy Online Magazine
