= Newton Township, Otter Tail County, Minnesota =

Newton Township, Minnesota
- Township
- Location of Newton Township, within Otter Tail County, Minnesota

- Location within the state of Minnesota Newton Township, Minnesota (the United States)
- Coordinates: 46°29′50″N 95°21′11″W
- Country: United States
- State: Minnesota
- County: Otter Tail

Area
  - Total: 35.2 sq mi (91.2 km^{2})
  - Land: 35.0 sq mi (90.6 km^{2})
  - Water: 0.27 sq mi (0.7 km^{2})
- Elevation: 1,404 ft (428 m)

Population (2020)
  - Total: 815
  - Density: 23.3/sq mi (9.00/km^{2})
- Time zone: UTC-6 (Central (CST))
  - Summer (DST): UTC-5 (CDT)
- FIPS code: 27-46006
- GNIS feature ID: 0665115

Newton Township is a township in Otter Tail County, Minnesota, United States. The population was 815 at the 2020 census.

Newton Township was originally called New York Mills Township, and under the latter name was organized in 1877. The present name was adopted in 1883.

== Geography ==
According to the United States Census Bureau, the township has a total area of 35.2 square miles (91.2 km^{2}), of which 35.0 square miles (90.6 km^{2}) is land and 0.2 square mile (0.6 km^{2}) (0.71%) is water.

== Demographics ==
As of the census of 2000, there were 751 people, 265 households, and 218 families residing in the township. The population density was 21.5 people per square mile (8.3/km^{2}). There were 293 housing units at an average density of 8.4/sq mi (3.2/km^{2}). The racial makeup of the township was 98.93% White, 0.13% African American, 0.13% Native American, 0.13% Asian, and 0.67% from two or more races.

There were 265 households, out of which 40.0% had children under the age of 18 living with them, 73.2% were married couples living together, 4.9% had a female householder with no husband present, and 17.7% were non-families. 15.8% of all households were made up of individuals, and 4.9% had someone living alone who was 65 years of age or older. The average household size was 2.83 and the average family size was 3.17.

In the township the population was spread out, with 29.2% under the age of 18, 6.7% from 18 to 24, 29.3% from 25 to 44, 24.2% from 45 to 64, and 10.7% who were 65 years of age or older. The median age was 36 years. For every 100 females, there were 115.2 males. For every 100 females age 18 and over, there were 112.0 males.

The median income for a household in the township was $39,196, and the median income for a family was $41,364. Males had a median income of $26,406 versus $20,250 for females. The per capita income for the township was $15,925. About 8.4% of families and 8.5% of the population were below the poverty line, including 11.7% of those under age 18 and 11.1% of those age 65 or over.
