= Glyndon, Minnesota =

City in Minnesota, United States

- City
- Nickname: G-town
- Motto: A Great Place to Call Home
- Interactive map of Glyndon, Minnesota
- Location within Minnesota
- Coordinates: 46.8710°N 96.5784°W
- Country: United States
- State: Minnesota
- County: Clay
- Founded: Spring of 1872
- Organized: 1875
- Incorporated (village): February 14, 1881
- Incorporated (city): April 6, 1908
- Named for: Howard Glyndon

Government
  - Type: Mayor–council
  - Mayor: Joe Olson
  - Councilmembers: Bryant DeVries; Shonna Severson; Patrick McCoy; Steven Ring

Area
  - Total: 1.582 sq mi (4.097 km^{2})
  - Land: 1.582 sq mi (4.097 km^{2})
  - Water: 0 sq mi (0.000 km^{2}) 0.00%
- Elevation: 922 ft (281 m)

Population (2020)
  - Total: 1,306
  - Estimate (2025): 1,393
  - Density: 825.6/sq mi (318.8/km^{2})
- Time zone: UTC–6 (Central (CST))
  - Summer (DST): UTC–5 (CDT)
- ZIP Code: 56547
- Area code: 218
- FIPS code: 27-24182
- GNIS feature ID: 2394918
- Highway: US 10
- Website: glyndonmn.com

Glyndon (/ˈɡlɪndən/ GLIN-dən) is a city in Clay County, Minnesota, United States. The population was 1,306 as of the 2020 census, and was estimated at 1,393 in 2025.

== History ==
Glyndon was platted in 1872 when the railroad was extended to that point. A post office has been in operation in Glyndon since 1872.

== Geography ==
According to the United States Census Bureau, the city has a total area of 1.582 square miles (4.10 km^{2}), all land.

The city was named after Howard Glyndon, the pen name of poet Laura C. Redden Searing.

U.S. Route 10 serves as a main route in the city.

== Demographics ==
Historical population
Census	Pop.	Note	%±
1880	406		—
1890	275		−32.3%
1900	250		−9.1%
1910	295		18.0%
1920	382		29.5%
1930	388		1.6%
1940	405		4.4%
1950	411		1.5%
1960	489		19.0%
1970	674		37.8%
1980	882		30.9%
1990	862		−2.3%
2000	1,049		21.7%
2010	1,394		32.9%
2020	1,306		−6.3%
2025 (est.)	1,393		6.7%
U.S. Decennial Census; 2020 Census

According to realtor website Zillow, the average price of a home as of August 31, 2026, in Glyndon was $360,732.

As of the 2024 American Community Survey, there were 391 estimated households in Glyndon with an average of 2.81 persons per household. The city has a median household income of $95,313. Approximately 8.0% of the city's population lives at or below the poverty line. Glyndon has an estimated 67.5% employment rate, with 27.5% of the population holding a bachelor's degree or higher and 92.7% holding a high school diploma. There were 391 housing units at an average density of 247.16 per square mile (95.43/km^{2}).

The top five reported languages (people were allowed to report up to two languages, thus the figures will generally add to more than 100%) were English (91.6%), Spanish (3.8%), Indo-European (0.6%), Asian and Pacific Islander (4.0%), and Other (0.0%).

The median age in the city was 35.5 years.

Glyndon, Minnesota – racial and ethnic composition Note: the US Census treats Hispanic/Latino as an ethnic category. This table excludes Latinos from the racial categories and assigns them to a separate category. Hispanics/Latinos may be of any race.
Race / ethnicity (NH = non-Hispanic)
Race / ethnicity (NH = non-Hispanic)	Population 2000		Population 2010		Population 2020	
Race / ethnicity (NH = non-Hispanic)	Number	Percent	Number	Percent	Number	Percent
White alone (NH)	960	91.52%	1,234	88.52%	1,080	82.70%
Black or African American alone (NH)	1	0.10%	17	1.22%	17	1.30%
Native American or Alaska Native alone (NH)	3	0.29%	38	2.73%	18	1.38%
Asian alone (NH)	1	0.10%	0	0.00%	4	0.31%
Pacific Islander alone (NH)	0	0.00%	0	0.00%	0	0.00%
Other race alone (NH)	1	0.10%	4	0.29%	0	0.00%
Mixed race or multiracial (NH)	4	0.38%	17	1.22%	87	6.66%
Hispanic or Latino (any race)	79	7.53%	84	6.03%	100	7.66%
Total	1,049	100.00%	1,394	100.00%	1,306	100.00%

=== 2020 census ===
As of the 2020 census, there were 1,306 people, 458 households, and 338 families residing in the city. The population density was 825.54 inhabitants per square mile (318.74/km^{2}). There were 499 housing units at an average density of 315.42 per square mile (121.78/km^{2}). The racial makeup of the city was 84.46% White, 1.30% African American, 1.61% Native American, 0.31% Asian, 0.00% Pacific Islander, 1.99% from some other races and 10.34% from two or more races. Hispanic or Latino people of any race were 7.66% of the population.

=== 2010 census ===
As of the 2010 census, there were 1,394 people, 464 households, and 360 families residing in the city. The population density was 922.57 inhabitants per square mile (356.21/km^{2}). There were 487 housing units at an average density of 322.30 per square mile (124.44/km^{2}). The racial makeup of the city was 92.25% White, 1.22% African American, 2.80% Native American, 0.00% Asian, 0.00% Pacific Islander, 1.94% from some other races and 1.79% from two or more races. Hispanic or Latino people of any race were 6.03% of the population.

There were 464 households, of which 50.9% had children under the age of 18 living with them, 65.5% were married couples living together, 6.7% had a female householder with no husband present, 5.4% had a male householder with no wife present, and 22.4% were non-families. 18.5% of all households were made up of individuals, and 5.1% had someone living alone who was 65 years of age or older. The average household size was 3.00 and the average family size was 3.45.

The median age in the city was 29.5 years. 35.4% of residents were under the age of 18; 6.9% were between the ages of 18 and 24; 32.4% were from 25 to 44; 18.2% were from 45 to 64; and 6.9% were 65 years of age or older. The gender makeup of the city was 50.9% male and 49.1% female.

=== 2000 census ===
As of the 2000 census, there were 1,049 people, 359 households, and 283 families residing in the city. The population density was 693.46 inhabitants per square mile (267.75/km^{2}). There were 403 housing units at an average density of 266.41 per square mile (102.86/km^{2}). The racial makeup of the city was 95.71% White, 0.10% African American, 0.29% Native American, 0.10% Asian, 0.00% Pacific Islander, 1.91% from some other races and 1.91% from two or more races. Hispanic or Latino people of any race were 7.53% of the population.

There were 359 households, out of which 44.6% had children under the age of 18 living with them, 65.2% were married couples living together, 10.3% had a female householder with no husband present, and 20.9% were non-families. 18.7% of all households were made up of individuals, and 4.7% had someone living alone who was 65 years of age or older. The average household size was 2.92 and the average family size was 3.33.

In the city, the population was spread out, with 34.2% under the age of 18, 8.0% from 18 to 24, 31.0% from 25 to 44, 19.4% from 45 to 64, and 7.4% who were 65 years of age or older. The median age was 30 years. For every 100 females, there were 102.1 males. For every 100 females age 18 and over, there were 96.6 males.

The median income for a household in the city was $44,028, and the median income for a family was $50,000. Males had a median income of $35,259 versus $22,303 for females. The per capita income for the city was $17,922. About 7.3% of families and 9.7% of the population were below the poverty line, including 12.8% of those under age 18 and 5.1% of those age 65 or over.

== Transportation ==
Amtrak’s Empire Builder, which operates between Seattle/Portland and Chicago, passes through the town on BNSF tracks, but makes no stop. The nearest station is located in Fargo, 10 miles (16 km) to the west.

== Notable people ==
- Keith Langseth, member of the Minnesota Senate, born 1938 in Glyndon
- Cal Larson, politician and businessman, born 1930 in Glyndon
- Arthur L. Peterson, politician and educator, born 1926 in Glyndon
