= New York Mills, Minnesota =

City in Minnesota, United States

New York Mills
- City
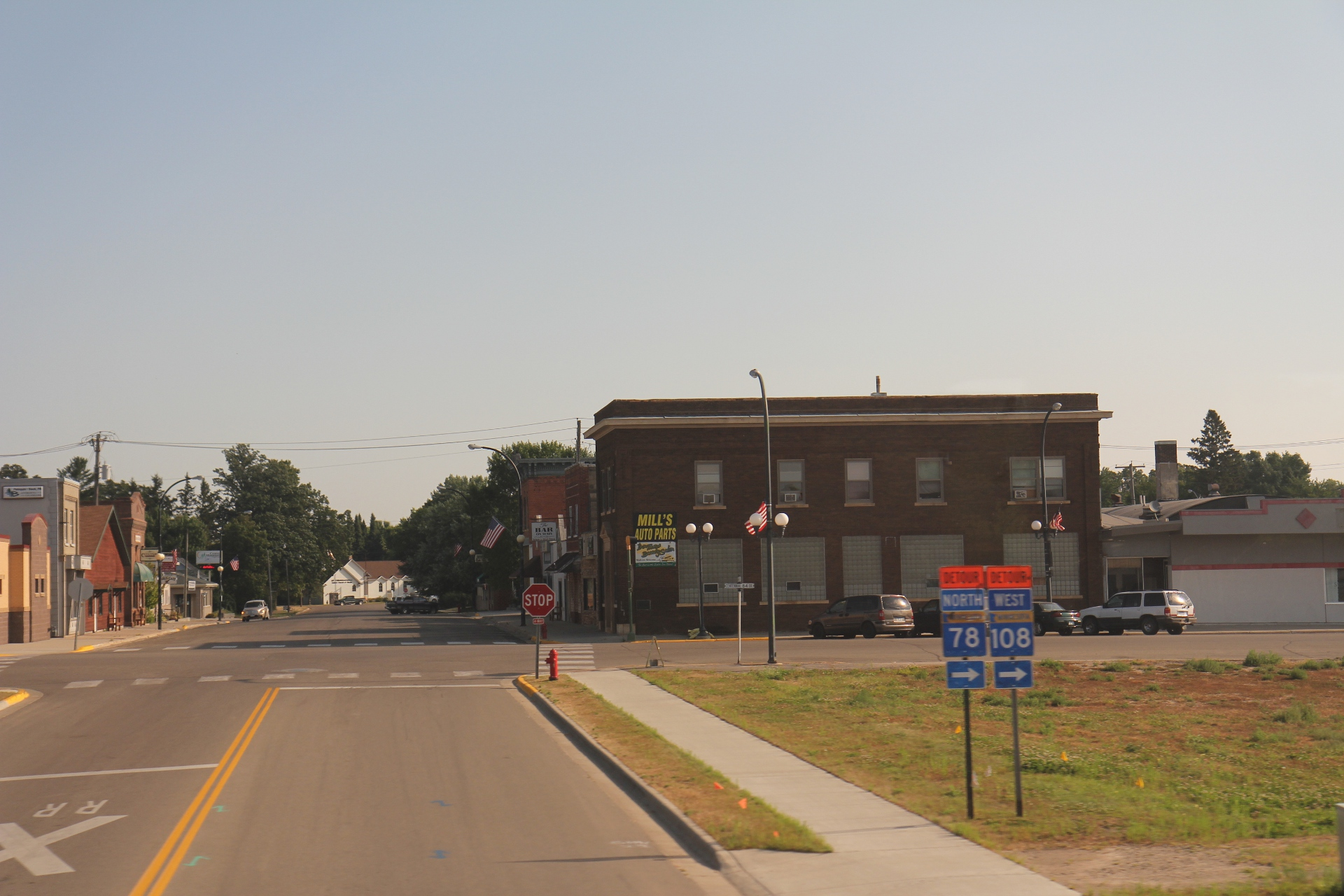
- Downtown New York Mills
- Motto: "Small Town, Big Life."
- Location of New York Mills, Minnesota
- Coordinates: 46°31′10″N 95°22′24″W
- Country: United States
- State: Minnesota
- County: Otter Tail
- Founded: 1884

Area
  - Total: 1.46 sq mi (3.77 km^{2})
  - Land: 1.45 sq mi (3.76 km^{2})
  - Water: 0.0039 sq mi (0.01 km^{2})
- Elevation: 1,417 ft (432 m)

Population (2020)
  - Total: 1,294
  - Estimate (2024): 1,481
  - Density: 890.6/sq mi (343.87/km^{2})
- Time zone: UTC-6 (Central)
  - Summer (DST): UTC-5 (CDT)
- ZIP code: 56567
- Area code: 218
- FIPS code: 27-46060
- GNIS feature ID: 2395221
- Website: newyorkmills.gov

New York Mills is a city in Otter Tail County, Minnesota, United States. The population was 1,294 at the 2020 census.

== History ==
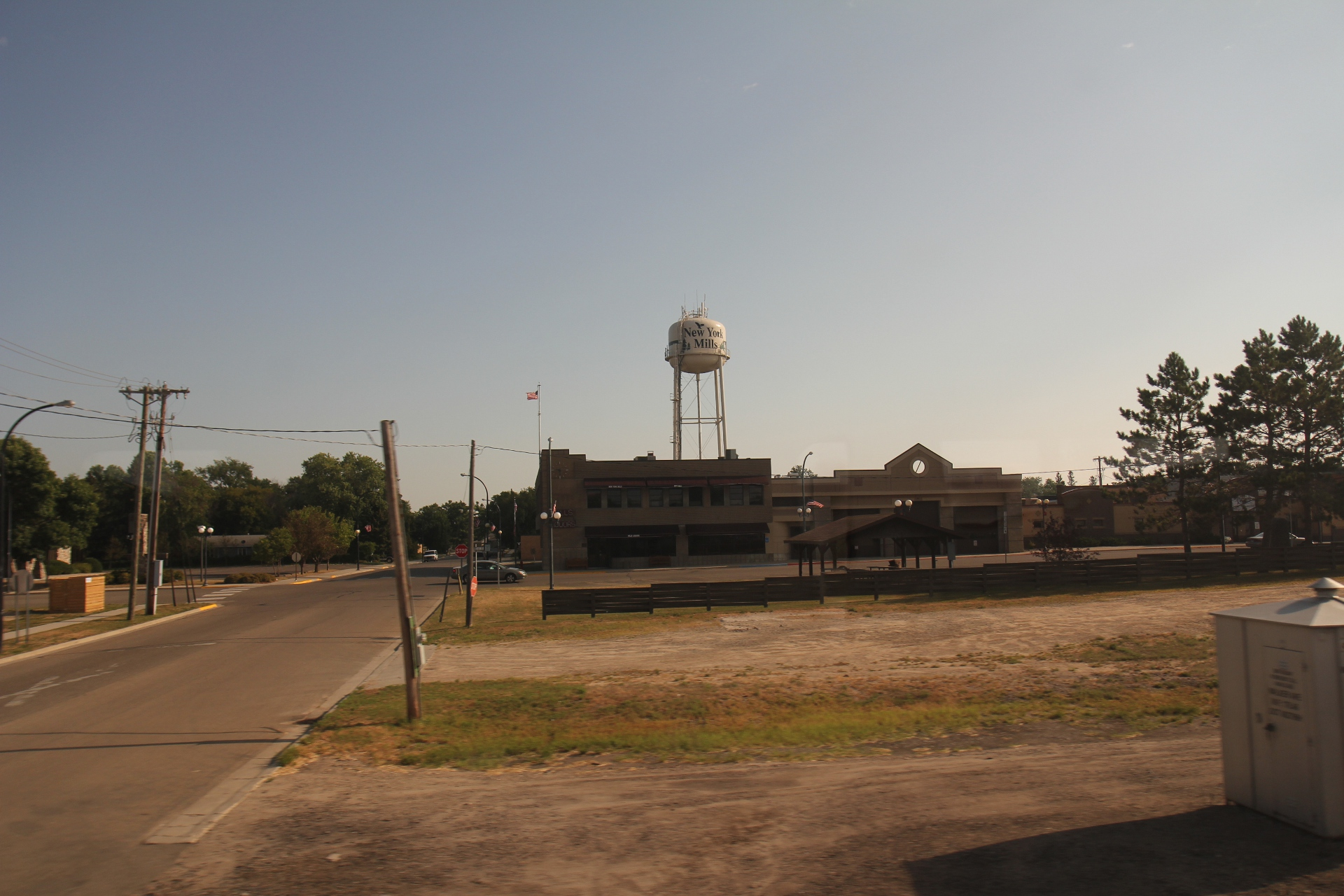
Downtown New York Mills and water tower

New York Mills was platted in 1883. The city was originally built up chiefly by Finns.

== Geography ==
According to the United States Census Bureau, the city has an area of 1.30 square miles (3.37 km^{2}), all land.

=== Climate ===
Climate data for New York Mills, Minnesota, 1991–2020 normals, extremes 2000–present
Month	Jan	Feb	Mar	Apr	May	Jun	Jul	Aug	Sep	Oct	Nov	Dec	Year
Record high °F (°C)	50 (10)	54 (12)	73 (23)	91 (33)	97 (36)	97 (36)	100 (38)	97 (36)	93 (34)	88 (31)	72 (22)	50 (10)	100 (38)
Mean maximum °F (°C)	40.1 (4.5)	41.3 (5.2)	57.1 (13.9)	72.5 (22.5)	85.4 (29.7)	86.3 (30.2)	89.1 (31.7)	87.5 (30.8)	83.1 (28.4)	75.0 (23.9)	59.0 (15.0)	42.1 (5.6)	90.6 (32.6)
Mean daily maximum °F (°C)	17.0 (−8.3)	22.3 (−5.4)	35.0 (1.7)	50.5 (10.3)	63.8 (17.7)	74.1 (23.4)	79.0 (26.1)	76.3 (24.6)	68.5 (20.3)	52.2 (11.2)	36.3 (2.4)	22.8 (−5.1)	49.8 (9.9)
Daily mean °F (°C)	7.5 (−13.6)	11.7 (−11.3)	25.3 (−3.7)	39.8 (4.3)	53.0 (11.7)	63.6 (17.6)	68.5 (20.3)	65.7 (18.7)	57.5 (14.2)	42.8 (6.0)	27.9 (−2.3)	14.6 (−9.7)	39.8 (4.4)
Mean daily minimum °F (°C)	−1.9 (−18.8)	1.1 (−17.2)	15.5 (−9.2)	29.1 (−1.6)	42.2 (5.7)	53.0 (11.7)	58.0 (14.4)	55.0 (12.8)	46.6 (8.1)	33.3 (0.7)	19.5 (−6.9)	6.5 (−14.2)	29.8 (−1.2)
Mean minimum °F (°C)	−24.2 (−31.2)	−22.1 (−30.1)	−9.9 (−23.3)	12.9 (−10.6)	27.5 (−2.5)	41.1 (5.1)	47.5 (8.6)	43.3 (6.3)	32.0 (0.0)	19.6 (−6.9)	1.8 (−16.8)	−16.5 (−26.9)	−27.4 (−33.0)
Record low °F (°C)	−37 (−38)	−33 (−36)	−25 (−32)	−3 (−19)	21 (−6)	32 (0)	42 (6)	36 (2)	27 (−3)	12 (−11)	−8 (−22)	−28 (−33)	−37 (−38)
Average precipitation inches (mm)	0.38 (9.7)	0.63 (16)	0.91 (23)	2.02 (51)	3.33 (85)	4.48 (114)	4.86 (123)	3.15 (80)	2.94 (75)	2.53 (64)	0.82 (21)	0.83 (21)	26.88 (682.7)
Average snowfall inches (cm)	9.6 (24)	8.0 (20)	7.8 (20)	3.3 (8.4)	0.0 (0.0)	0.0 (0.0)	0.0 (0.0)	0.0 (0.0)	0.0 (0.0)	1.2 (3.0)	5.3 (13)	10.4 (26)	45.6 (114.4)
Average precipitation days (≥ 0.01 in)	5.3	5.3	6.0	7.1	10.4	12.4	10.4	8.8	10.0	9.3	5.2	6.6	96.8
Average snowy days (≥ 0.1 in)	6.3	5.9	4.6	1.8	0.0	0.0	0.0	0.0	0.0	0.8	3.5	7.0	29.9
Source 1: NOAA
Source 2: National Weather Service (mean maxima/minima 2006–2020)

== Transportation ==
U.S. Route 10 serves as a main route in the city.

Amtrak’s Empire Builder, which operates between Seattle/Portland and Chicago, passes through the town on BNSF tracks, but makes no stop. The nearest stations are located in Staples, 31 miles (50 km) to the southeast, and Detroit Lakes, 32 miles (51 km) to the northwest.

== Demographics ==
Historical population
Census	Pop.	Note	%±
1890	260		—
1900	353		35.8%
1910	474		34.3%
1920	700		47.7%
1930	667		−4.7%
1940	771		15.6%
1950	977		26.7%
1960	828		−15.3%
1970	791		−4.5%
1980	972		22.9%
1990	940		−3.3%
2000	1,158		23.2%
2010	1,199		3.5%
2020	1,294		7.9%
2024 (est.)	1,481		14.5%
U.S. Decennial Census; 2020 Census

=== 2020 census ===
As of the census of 2020, there were 1,294 people, 556 households, and 303 families living in the city. The population density was 890.6 inhabitants per square mile (343.9/km²). There were 628 housing units at an average density of 448.6 per square mile (173.2/km²). The racial makeup of the city was 91.9% White, 1.2% American Indian, 0.2% Asian, 0.8% from some other race, and 6.0% from two or more races. Hispanic or Latino of any race were 2.9% of the population.

There were 556 households, of which 26.1% had children under the age of 18 living with them, 37.2% were married couples living together, 4.9% had a female householder with no spouse present, 3.1% had a male householder with no spouse present, and 45.5% were non-families. 37.9% of all households were made up of individuals, and 31.8% had someone living alone who was 65 years of age or older. The average household size was 2.29.

The median age in the city was 34.9 years. 26.4% of residents were under the age of 18; 8.5% were between the ages of 18 and 24; 25.0% were from 25 to 44; 19.1% were from 45 to 64; and 20.9% were 65 years of age or older. The gender makeup of the city was 49.8% male and 50.2% female.

=== 2010 census ===
As of the census of 2010, there were 1,199 people, 533 households, and 287 families living in the city. The population density was 922.3 inhabitants per square mile (356.1/km^{2}). There were 602 housing units at an average density of 463.1 per square mile (178.8/km^{2}). The racial makeup of the city was 94.8% White, 0.3% African American, 1.8% Native American, 0.3% from other races, and 2.8% from two or more races. Hispanic or Latino of any race were 1.8% of the population.

There were 533 households, of which 27.4% had children under the age of 18 living with them, 39.4% were married couples living together, 10.7% had a female householder with no husband present, 3.8% had a male householder with no wife present, and 46.2% were non-families. 40.0% of all households were made up of individuals, and 22.1% had someone living alone who was 65 years of age or older. The average household size was 2.12 and the average family size was 2.84.

The median age in the city was 38.9 years. 23.9% of residents were under the age of 18; 9% were between the ages of 18 and 24; 22% were from 25 to 44; 22.6% were from 45 to 64; and 22.5% were 65 years of age or older. The gender makeup of the city was 46.0% male and 54.0% female.

=== 2000 census ===
As of the census of 2000, there were 1,158 people, 492 households, and 276 families living in the city. The population density was 926.7 inhabitants per square mile (357.8/km^{2}). There were 535 housing units at an average density of 428.1 per square mile (165.3/km^{2}). The racial makeup of the city was 98.53% White, 0.09% African American, 0.35% Native American, 0.17% from other races, and 0.86% from two or more races. Hispanic or Latino of any race were 1.30% of the population. 27.4% were of German, 25.5% Finnish, 13.5% Norwegian, and 5.4% Swedish ancestry.

There were 492 households, out of which 27.8% had children under the age of 18 living with them, 42.5% were married couples living together, 9.6% had a female householder with no husband present, and 43.9% were non-families. 40.0% of all households were made up of individuals, and 27.8% had someone living alone who was 65 years of age or older. The average household size was 2.18 and the average family size was 2.92.

In the city, the population was spread out, with 22.5% under the age of 18, 8.7% from 18 to 24, 20.6% from 25 to 44, 16.5% from 45 to 64, and 31.7% who were 65 years of age or older. The median age was 43 years. For every 100 females, there were 82.6 males. For every 100 females age 18 and over, there were 79.2 males.

The median income for a household in the city was $27,596, and the median income for a family was $35,536. Males had a median income of $29,286 versus $18,333 for females. The per capita income for the city was $15,949. About 11.7% of families and 17.1% of the population were below the poverty line, including 21.7% of those under age 18 and 19.0% of those age 65 or over.

== Arts and economic development ==
New York Mills was founded in 1884 by Finnish immigrants. Major industries include agriculture (row crops, grain and dairy farming), Lund Boat Company fishing boat manufacturers, and a variety of service professions. Tourism is an increasingly important economic factor in the area; Otter Tail County contains 1,048 of the state's lakes,

New York Mills Regional Cultural Center

=== New York Mills Regional Cultural Center ===
Faced with the economic challenges and decreasing population of many rural communities, New York Mills decided to invest in a Regional Arts Center in an attempt to bring tourism to the area. In 1991, the city contributed $35,000 to the Regional Arts Retreat and Cultural Center to convert a downtown mercantile building into a multi-use arts and cultural facility. As a per-capita investment, this expenditure was the equivalent of Minneapolis giving $13.7 million to an arts facility. The center, remodeled through a community-wide volunteer effort, opened in June 1992, as a nonprofit arts organization founded by John Davis. Further renovations include a hardwood maple floor in the main gallery and an outdoor deck completed in 2005. While other communities withered in the face of declining populations and deteriorating main streets, New York Mills has remained stable economically, and the Cultural Center continues to draw people, activity, revenue and national attention.

==== Programs ====
- Artist-In-Residence Program
- Education/Outreach programs
- Gallery Exhibits
- “Great American Think-Off” Annual Philosophical Debate
- Literary and Theater Events
- Music Concert Series
- Sculpture Park

==== Past exhibiting artists ====
- Robin Barcus Slonina
- Charles Beck
- Betsy Bowen
- Duane & Bambi Goodwin
- Eric Johnson
- Kent Kapplinger
- Maxwell MacKenzie
- David Salmela
- Charvis Harrell

== Notable people ==
- Peter Hayes, indie rock guitarist and singer
- Janet Karvonen, pioneer for girls' basketball
- Dean Simpson, businessman, Minnesota state legislator, and mayor

== See also ==
- Finn Creek Museum
