= Minnesota State Highway 275 =

State highway in Minnesota, United States

Trunk Highway 275
- MN 275 highlighted in red

Route information
- Maintained by MnDOT
- Length: 6.519 mi (10.491 km)
- Existed: July 1, 1949–2017

Major junctions
- South end: CSAH 2 at Boyd
- North end: US 212 at Baxter Township, near Dawson

Location
- Country: United States
- State: Minnesota
- Counties: Lac qui Parle

Highway system
- Minnesota Trunk Highway System; Interstate; US; State; Legislative; Scenic
← MN 274	→ MN 277

Minnesota State Highway 275 (MN 275) was a 6.519-mile-long (10.491 km) highway in southwest Minnesota, which ran from its intersection with Lac qui Parle County State-Aid Highway 2 in Boyd and continued north to its northern terminus at its intersection with U.S. Highway 212 in Baxter Township, 6 miles east of Dawson. It is now marked as Lac qui Parle County State-Aid Highway 29, and Lac qui Parle County Road 208 in the city limits of Boyd.

== Route description ==
Highway 275 served as a north–south connector route in southwest Minnesota between the town of Boyd and U.S. Highway 212.

Highway 275 followed 3rd Street in the town of Boyd.

The route was legally defined as Route 275 in the Minnesota Statutes.

== History ==
Highway 275 was authorized on July 1, 1949.

The route was paved in 1954 or 1955.

Highway 275 was removed from statute in 2015 and given to Lac qui Parle County in 2017 as part of a road exchange, which transferred Lac qui Parle County State-Aid Highway 25 between Highway 40 and US 212 to the state as an extension of Minnesota State Highway 119.

== Major intersections ==
The entire route was in Lac qui Parle County.

Location	mi	km	Destinations	Notes
Boyd	0.000	0.000	CSAH 2 (South Avenue)	Southern terminus
Boyd	0.603	0.970	CSAH 29	
Ten Mile Lake Township	3.060	4.925	CSAH 8 east	
Baxter Township	3.565	5.737	CSAH 8 west	
Baxter Township	6.527	10.504	US 212 – Dawson, Montevideo CSAH 31 north	Northern terminus
1.000 mi = 1.609 km; 1.000 km = 0.621 mi
