= Engan =

Engan may refer to:

- Engan languages, a group of languages of Papua New Guinea
- Engan, India, a village in Tamil Nadu, India
- Engan, Norway, a village in the municipality of Trøndelag
- Engan, a surname; notable people with the name include:
  - Erling Engan (1910–1982), Norwegian politician
  - Jonette Engan (born 1951), American politician
  - Kjersti Engan (born 1971), Norwegian electrical engineer
  - Toralf Engan (born 1936), Norwegian ski jumper
