= Cerro Gordo, Minnesota =

Unincorporated community in Minnesota, United States

- Unincorporated community
- Location within Minnesota Location within the United States
- Coordinates: 45°03′09″N 96°01′55″W
- Country: United States
- State: Minnesota
- County: Lac qui Parle
- Township: Cerro Gordo
- Elevation: 1,040 ft (320 m)
- Time zone: UTC-6 (Central (CST))
  - Summer (DST): UTC-5 (CDT)
- Area code: 320
- GNIS feature ID: 654640

Cerro Gordo (also Cerrogordo) is an unincorporated community in Cerro Gordo Township, Lac qui Parle County, Minnesota, United States.
