= Windingstad =

Windingstad is a surname. Notable people with the surname include:

- Harold Windingstad (1929–2006), American politician and farmer
- Ole Windingstad (1886–1959), Norwegian conductor, pianist, and composer
- Rasmus Windingstad (born 1993), Norwegian alpine ski racer
