= Cerro Gordo Township =

Cerro Gordo Township may refer to the following townships in the United States:

- Cerro Gordo Township, Piatt County, Illinois
- Cerro Gordo Township, Lac qui Parle County, Minnesota
