= Alvin O. Hofstad =

American farmer and politician

- Born: March 29, 1905; Madison, Lac qui Parle County, Minnesota, United States
- Died: November 14, 1962 (aged 57)
- Occupations: farmer, politician
- Known for: Minnesota House of Representatives (1951–1962)

Alvin Ottman Hofstad (March 29, 1905 – November 14, 1962) was an American farmer and politician.

== Early life, career and death ==
Hofstad was born in Madison, Lac qui Parle County, Minnesota, and was a farmer. He lived in Madison, Minnesota with his wife and family. Hofstad served on the Madison School Board. He also served in the Minnesota House of Representatives from 1951 to his death in 1962. He died while still in office.
