= Maxwell Township, Lac qui Parle County, Minnesota =

Maxwell Township, Minnesota
- Township
- Location within the state of Minnesota Maxwell Township, Minnesota (the United States)
- Coordinates: 44°51′12″N 96°2′31″W
- Country: United States
- State: Minnesota
- County: Lac qui Parle
- Named after: Joseph Henry Maxwell

Area
  - Total: 36.3 sq mi (94.0 km^{2})
  - Land: 36.2 sq mi (93.8 km^{2})
  - Water: 0.077 sq mi (0.2 km^{2})
- Elevation: 1,089 ft (332 m)

Population (2000)
  - Total: 206
  - Density: 5.7/sq mi (2.2/km^{2})
- Time zone: UTC-6 (Central (CST))
  - Summer (DST): UTC-5 (CDT)
- Postal code: 56232
- Area code: 320
- FIPS code: 27-41084
- GNIS feature ID: 0664930

Maxwell Township is a township in Lac qui Parle County, Minnesota, United States. The population was 206 at the 2000 census.

Maxwell Township was organized in 1878, and named for Joseph Henry Maxwell, an early settler.

== Geography ==
According to the United States Census Bureau, the township has a total area of 36.3 square miles (94.0 km^{2}), of which 36.2 square miles (93.8 km^{2}) is land and 0.1 square mile (0.2 km^{2}) (0.19%) is water. The Lac qui Parle River runs through the township. Tenmile Creek, a drainage ditch, runs throughout the township. Many ponds and other bodies of water are scattered throughout the township.

== Locations ==
=== State Wildlife Management Areas ===
==== Ten-Well State Wildlife Management Area ====
Ten-Well Wildlife Management Area is 175.13 acres large. Its perimeter is 3.64 miles. The area contains deer, small game, pheasants, and waterfowl. Swanson Lake is contained within the wildlife management area.

==== Wild Wings State Wildlife Management Area ====
Wild Wings State Wildlife Management Area is 166.13 acres large. Its perimeter is 2.53 miles. The area contains deer, small game, pheasants, and waterfowl. A slough is located inside of the wildlife management area.

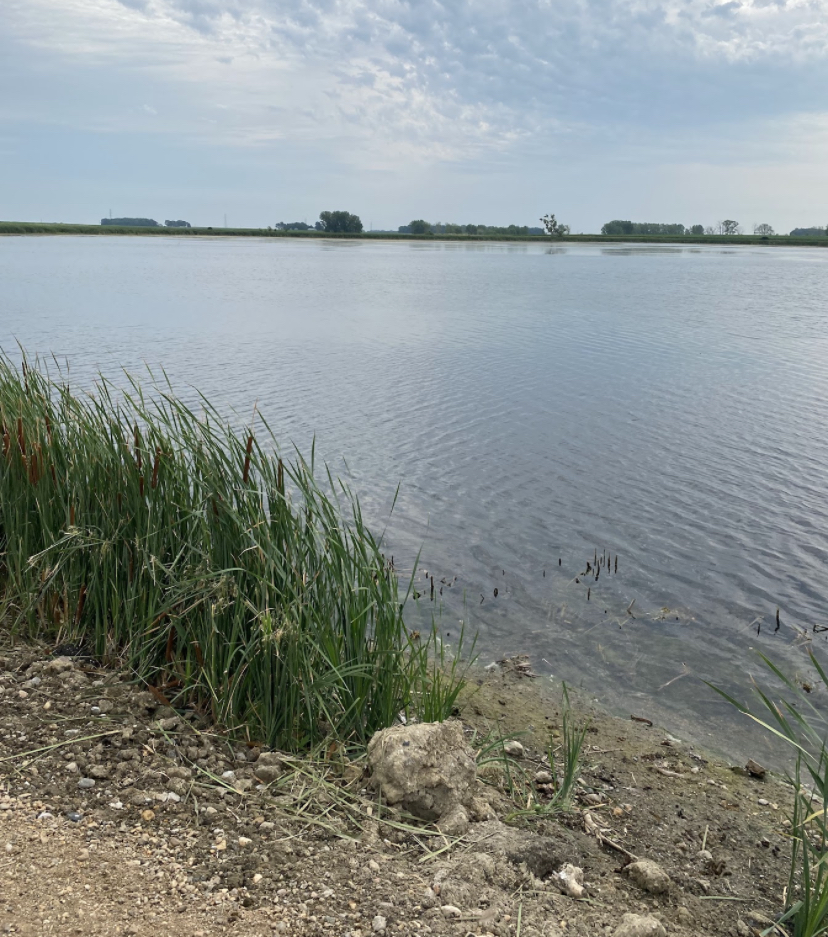
A slough in the Wild Wings State Wildlife Management Area

==== Medicine Pipe State Wildlife Management Area ====
Medicine Pipe State Wildlife Management Area is 36.39 acres large. Its perimeter is 1.63 miles. The area contains deer, small game, and pheasants.

=== Other Locations ===
- Maxwell Town Hall is located on 130th Street, near Wild Wings State Wildlife Management Area.
- Dawson Covenant Church is located near the western border of Maxwell township.

== Demographics ==
As of the census of 2000, there were 206 people, 76 households, and 56 families residing in the township. The population density was 5.7 inhabitants per square mile (2.2/km^{2}). There were 84 housing units at an average density of 2.3 per square mile (0.89/km^{2}). The racial makeup of the township was 100.00% white.

There were 76 households, out of which 38.2% had children under the age of 18 living with them, 69.7% were married couples living together, 2.6% had a female householder with no husband present, and 26.3% were non-families. 26.3% of all households were made up of individuals, and 14.5% had someone living alone who was 65 years of age or older. The average household size was 2.71 and the average family size was 3.32.

In the township the population was spread out, with 32.5% under the age of 18, 4.9% from 18 to 24, 23.3% from 25 to 44, 27.2% from 45 to 64, and 12.1% who were 65 years of age or older. The median age was 40 years. For every 100 females, there were 98.1 males. For every 100 females age 18 and over, there were 101.4 males.

The median income for a household in the township was $36,250, and the median income for a family was $41,250. Males had a median income of $23,750 versus $23,125 for females. The per capita income for the township was $16,161. About 5.2% of families and 7.4% of the population were below the poverty line, including 7.0% of those under the age of eighteen and none of those 65 or over.
