= Haydenville =

Haydenville may refer to:

- Haydenville, California, former name of Bear Valley, Mariposa County, California
- Haydenville, Massachusetts
  - Haydenville Historic District
- Haydenville, Minnesota
- Haydenville, Ohio
