= Riverside Township, Lac qui Parle County, Minnesota =

Riverside Township, Minnesota
- Township
- Location within the state of Minnesota Riverside Township, Minnesota (the United States)
- Coordinates: 44°56′14″N 96°2′35″W
- Country: United States
- State: Minnesota
- County: Lac qui Parle

Area
  - Total: 34.5 sq mi (89.3 km^{2})
  - Land: 34.4 sq mi (89.2 km^{2})
  - Water: 0.039 sq mi (0.1 km^{2})
- Elevation: 1,053 ft (321 m)

Population (2000)
  - Total: 301
  - Density: 8.8/sq mi (3.4/km^{2})
- Time zone: UTC-6 (Central (CST))
  - Summer (DST): UTC-5 (CDT)
- FIPS code: 27-54646
- GNIS feature ID: 0665426

Riverside Township is a township in Lac qui Parle County, Minnesota, United States. The population was 301 at the 2000 census.

Riverside Township was organized in 1872, and named for its location on the Lac qui Parle River.

== Geography ==
According to the United States Census Bureau, the township has a total area of 34.5 square miles (89.3 km^{2}), of which 34.4 square miles (89.2 km^{2}) is land and 0.1 square mile (0.2 km^{2}) (0.17%) is water.

== Demographics ==
As of the census of 2000, there were 301 people, 113 households, and 82 families residing in the township. The population density was 8.7 people per square mile (3.4/km^{2}). There were 122 housing units at an average density of 3.5/sq mi (1.4/km^{2}). The racial makeup of the township was 99.67% White, and 0.33% from two or more races.

There were 113 households, out of which 30.1% had children under the age of 18 living with them, 67.3% were married couples living together, 1.8% had a female householder with no husband present, and 27.4% were non-families. 22.1% of all households were made up of individuals, and 5.3% had someone living alone who was 65 years of age or older. The average household size was 2.61 and the average family size was 3.10.

In the township the population was spread out, with 28.6% under the age of 18, 5.3% from 18 to 24, 27.6% from 25 to 44, 22.6% from 45 to 64, and 15.9% who were 65 years of age or older. The median age was 40 years. For every 100 females, there were 115.0 males. For every 100 females age 18 and over, there were 119.4 males.

The median income for a household in the township was $43,750, and the median income for a family was $48,472. Males had a median income of $28,500 versus $19,375 for females. The per capita income for the township was $19,205. About 9.9% of families and 11.1% of the population were below the poverty line, including 10.6% of those under the age of eighteen and 9.3% of those 65 or over.
