= Lac qui Parle Valley School District =

School in Madison, Minnesota, United States

Address
- 2860 291st Avenue Madison, Minnesota, 56256; United States

District information
- Motto: We Soar as One
- Grades: Pre-Kindergarten - 12
- Superintendent: Scott Lempka
- NCES District ID: 2700125
- District ID: ISD 2853

Students and staff
- Enrollment: 820
- District mascot: Eagle

Other information
- Website: www.lqpv.org

The Lac qui Parle Valley School District is a public school district in Lac qui Parle County, Minnesota. It was created in 1990 when schools from Appleton, Madison, and Milan consolidated.

== Schools ==
The Lac qui Parle Valley School District has two elementary schools, one middle school and one high school.

=== Elementary schools ===
- Madison-Marietta-Nassau Elementary School
- Appleton-Milan Elementary School

=== Middle school ===
- Lac qui Parle Valley Middle School
  - The middle school and high school are taught in the same building.

=== High school ===
- Lac qui Parle Valley High School

Opened in the fall of 1990 for grades 7–12, LQPVHS is a combination of the surrounding school districts of Madison, Marietta, Nassau, Appleton, Milan and Bellingham.

== Activities and athletics ==
Lac qui Parle Valley School District offers these activities and athletics to its students through the Minnesota State High School League.

LQPV School District MSHSL Activities
Activity	Gender	Season
Cross country running	Girls and boys separate	Fall
Football	Co-ed	Fall
Swimming and diving	Girls only	Fall
Tennis	Girls only	Fall
Volleyball	Girls only	Fall
Basketball	Girls and boys separate	Winter
Dance, high kick	Co-ed	Winter
Dance, Jazz	Co-ed	Winter
One Act Play	Co-ed	Winter
Wrestling	Co-ed	Winter
Baseball	Co-ed	Spring
Clay Target	Co-ed	Spring
Golf	Girls and boys separate	Spring
Music	Co-ed	Spring
Robotics	Co-ed	Spring
Softball	Girls only	Spring
Speech	Co-ed	Spring
Tennis	Boys only	Spring
Track and field	Girls and boys separate	Spring

The school also hosts a Knowledge Bowl team, FFA club, FCCLA club, as well as drama performances.
