= Case Lake =

Case Lake may refer to:

- Case Lake, a lake in Lac qui Parle County, Minnesota
- Case Lake, a lake in Watonwan County, Minnesota
- Lac de la Case, a lake in Haute-Savoie, France
- Case Lake, a lake near Cochrane, Ontario
