= Providence, Minnesota =

Unincorporated community in Minnesota, United States

- Unincorporated community
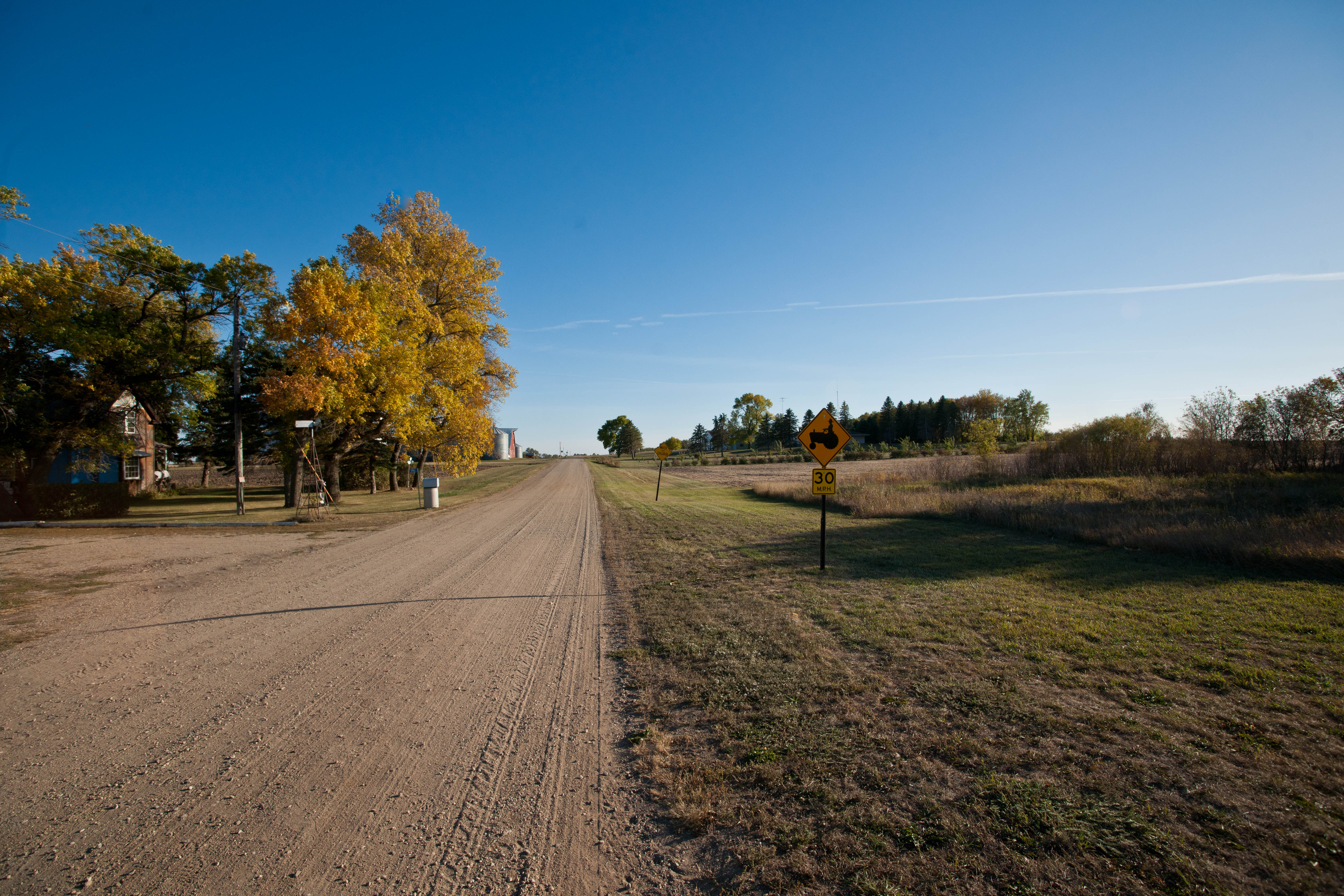

- Location within Minnesota Location within the United States
- Coordinates: 44°50′04″N 96°06′47″W
- Country: United States
- State: Minnesota
- County: Lac qui Parle
- Township: Providence
- Elevation: 1,079 ft (329 m)
- Time zone: UTC-6 (Central (CST))
  - Summer (DST): UTC-5 (CDT)
- Area code: 320
- GNIS feature ID: 649749

Providence is an unincorporated community in Providence Township, Lac qui Parle County, Minnesota, United States.
