= Jonette Engan =

American politician

- Born: November 29, 1951; Willmar, Minnesota
- Died: March 1, 2023; Willmar, Minnesota
- Occupations: political leader, community organizer
- Years active: 1983–2023
- Political party: Minnesota Democratic-Farmer-Labor Party
- Spouse: Dale
- Children: 2

Jonette Ellen (Carlson) Engan (November 29, 1951 - March 1, 2023) was an American politician and a member of the Minnesota Democratic-Farmer-Labor Party.

== DFL Party leader ==
A resident of Willmar, Minnesota, Engan was a longtime DFL Party leader. She served as chair of the old 2nd Congressional District DFL from 1989 to 1997, succeeding longtime chair Harold Windingstad. The sprawling district encompassed southwestern Minnesota, and included all or portions of 31 counties. Prior to being elected chair, she had served as associate chair of the district from 1983 to 1989.

In addition to her activism in congressional district politics, Engan was also involved at the state and national level. She was a member of the Minnesota DFL's central and executive committees, and was selected as a presidential elector for the 1992 presidential election in which Bill Clinton defeated George H. Bush and Ross Perot. The support of Engan and the ten other Minnesota members of the Electoral College went to Clinton, who had solidly won the state in the November election. She was a delegate to the Democratic National Convention in 1984 and 2000, and also attended the 1996 convention as a DFL official.

== Congressional campaign manager and adviser ==
Engan served as campaign manager for Madison teacher Doug Peterson's unsuccessful 1991 bid for Congress against incumbent Vin Weber. In 1993, she was a key adviser to David Minge in his successful bid for the same congressional seat against opponent Cal Ludeman. Minge later honored Engan by entering official remarks into the Congressional Record thanking her for her service to the DFL and the congressional district, and for her valued counsel and advice to him as a candidate and congressman.

== DFL "woman of distinction" ==
Engan opted not to run for re-election as chair of the congressional district in 1997. She was later honored by the state party as a "woman of distinction," and was inducted into the Minnesota DFL Women's Hall of Fame. In 2004, she served as a co-chair of the John Kerry for President organization in Minnesota.

While Engan later cut back on her political involvement, she remained active in her community and her church. She also remained involved in the DFL at the local level, serving as vice chair of the Kandiyohi County party organization. She died on March 1, 2023, with her family by her side.
