= Walter Township, Lac qui Parle County, Minnesota =

Walter Township, Minnesota
- Township
- Location within the state of Minnesota Walter Township, Minnesota (the United States)
- Coordinates: 45°6′26″N 96°24′14″W
- Country: United States
- State: Minnesota
- County: Lac qui Parle

Area
  - Total: 29.0 sq mi (75.2 km^{2})
  - Land: 29.0 sq mi (75.2 km^{2})
  - Water: 0 sq mi (0.0 km^{2})
- Elevation: 1,086 ft (331 m)

Population (2000)
  - Total: 186
  - Density: 6.5/sq mi (2.5/km^{2})
- Time zone: UTC-6 (Central (CST))
  - Summer (DST): UTC-5 (CDT)
- FIPS code: 27-67882
- GNIS feature ID: 0665904

Walter Township is a township in Lac qui Parle County, Minnesota, United States. The population was 186 at the 2000 census.

Walter Township was organized in 1884, and named for Henry Walter, a pioneer settler.

== Geography ==
According to the United States Census Bureau, the township has a total area of 29.0 square miles (75.2 km^{2}), all land.

== Demographics ==
As of the census of 2000, there were 186 people, 70 households, and 55 families residing in the township. The population density was 6.4 people per square mile (2.5/km^{2}). There were 75 housing units at an average density of 2.6/sq mi (1.0/km^{2}). The racial makeup of the township was 100.00% White.

There were 70 households, out of which 32.9% had children under the age of 18 living with them, 74.3% were married couples living together, 2.9% had a female householder with no husband present, and 21.4% were non-families. 18.6% of all households were made up of individuals, and 5.7% had someone living alone who was 65 years of age or older. The average household size was 2.66 and the average family size was 3.07.

In the township the population was spread out, with 28.5% under the age of 18, 3.8% from 18 to 24, 28.0% from 25 to 44, 23.1% from 45 to 64, and 16.7% who were 65 years of age or older. The median age was 38 years. For every 100 females, there were 104.4 males. For every 100 females age 18 and over, there were 104.6 males.

The median income for a household in the township was $28,125, and the median income for a family was $33,750. Males had a median income of $31,750 versus $19,167 for females. The per capita income for the township was $14,961. About 5.0% of families and 6.9% of the population were below the poverty line, including 11.9% of those under the age of eighteen and 2.4% of those 65 or over.
