= Manfred Township, Lac qui Parle County, Minnesota =

Manfred Township, Minnesota
- Township
- Location within the state of Minnesota Manfred Township, Minnesota (the United States)
- Coordinates: 44°51′26″N 96°24′31″W
- Country: United States
- State: Minnesota
- County: Lac qui Parle

Area
  - Total: 33.4 sq mi (86.6 km^{2})
  - Land: 33.1 sq mi (85.8 km^{2})
  - Water: 0.31 sq mi (0.8 km^{2})
- Elevation: 1,191 ft (363 m)

Population (2000)
  - Total: 111
  - Density: 3.4/sq mi (1.3/km^{2})
- Time zone: UTC-6 (Central (CST))
  - Summer (DST): UTC-5 (CDT)
- FIPS code: 27-39788
- GNIS feature ID: 0664888

Manfred Township is a township in Lac qui Parle County, Minnesota, United States. The population was 111 at the 2000 census.

Manfred Township was originally called Custer Township, in honor of George Armstrong Custer, and under the latter name was organized in 1879. The present name, adopted in 1884, is from the poem Manfred by Lord Byron.

== Geography ==
According to the United States Census Bureau, the township has a total area of 33.4 square miles (86.6 km^{2}), of which 33.1 square miles (85.8 km^{2}) is land and 0.3 square mile (0.8 km^{2}) (0.90%) is water.

== Demographics ==
As of the census of 2000, there were 111 people, 44 households, and 31 families residing in the township. The population density was 3.4 inhabitants per square mile (1.3/km^{2}). There were 49 housing units at an average density of 1.5 per square mile (0.58/km^{2}). The racial makeup of the township was 97.30% White and 2.70% Asian.

There were 44 households, out of which 25.0% had children under the age of 18 living with them, 65.9% were married couples living together, 4.5% had a female householder with no husband present, and 27.3% were non-families. 22.7% of all households were made up of individuals, and 11.4% had someone living alone who was 65 years of age or older. The average household size was 2.52 and the average family size was 2.97.

In the township the population was spread out, with 25.2% under the age of 18, 3.6% from 18 to 24, 21.6% from 25 to 44, 27.9% from 45 to 64, and 21.6% who were 65 years of age or older. The median age was 45 years. For every 100 females, there were 113.5 males. For every 100 females age 18 and over, there were 112.8 males.

The median income for a household in the township was $27,083, and the median income for a family was $31,250. Males had a median income of $20,000 versus $25,313 for females. The per capita income for the township was $12,928. There were 13.8% of families and 16.2% of the population living below the poverty line, including 8.8% of under eighteens and 16.7% of those over 64.
