= Rosen, Minnesota =

Unincorporated community in Minnesota, United States

- Unincorporated community
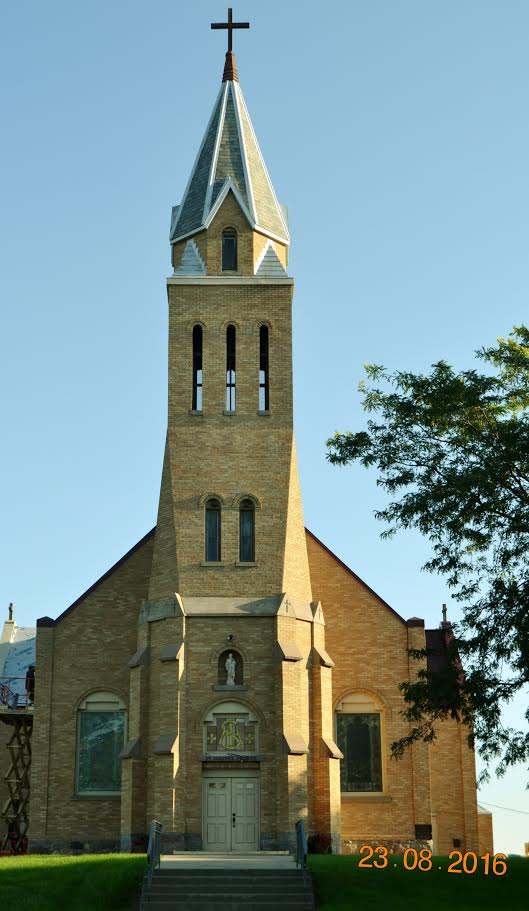
- St. Joseph's Church

- Location within Minnesota Location within the United States
- Coordinates: 45°09′13″N 96°24′05″W
- Country: United States
- State: Minnesota
- County: Lac qui Parle
- Township: Yellow Bank
- Elevation: 1,086 ft (331 m)
- Time zone: UTC-6 (Central (CST))
  - Summer (DST): UTC-5 (CDT)
- Area code: 320
- GNIS feature ID: 650292

Rosen is an unincorporated community in Yellow Bank Township, Lac qui Parle County, Minnesota, United States. It is home to Saint Joseph's Catholic Church.

The founding of Rosen is attributed to Father Peter Rosen, who came to St. Joseph's in 1895. It was during his pastorate that the church was incorporated and the village was given the name of Rosen. Fr. Rosen suggested to the elderly people of the parish to form a village by building homes and stores around the church to live when they retired from farming.

In 1885, a frame church (40 x 24) was built to stand east and west where the present church now stands. A church, rectory and cemetery were built in 1896. In 1907, the old church building was moved. A new 100' by 40' structure, with a tower of 106' high was built in its place at a cost of $20,000.

St. Joseph's School was built in 1927 at the cost of $18,200. In the spring of 1979 the last class was held in the Rosen School.

A recent addition to the facade of St. Joseph Church was a grotto of the Blessed Virgin Mary. The three granite leaf monument was donated by Rose Karels, in memory of the Rosen Pioneers.
