= Haydenville, Minnesota =

Unincorporated community in Minnesota, United States

- Unincorporated community
- Location within Minnesota Location within the United States
- Coordinates: 45°00′34″N 96°18′35″W
- Country: United States
- State: Minnesota
- County: Lac qui Parle
- Township: Arena
- Elevation: 1,086 ft (331 m)
- Time zone: UTC-6 (Central (CST))
  - Summer (DST): UTC-5 (CDT)
- Area code: 320
- GNIS feature ID: 644788

Haydenville is an unincorporated community in Arena Township, Lac qui Parle County, in the U.S. state of Minnesota.

== History ==
Haydenville was platted in 1910, and named for Herbert L. Hayden, the original owner of the town site.
