= Augusta Township, Lac qui Parle County, Minnesota =

Augusta Township, Minnesota
- Township
- Location within the state of Minnesota Augusta Township, Minnesota (the United States)
- Coordinates: 45°1′43″N 96°24′16″W
- Country: US
- State: Minnesota
- County: Lac qui Parle
- Named after: Augusta, Wisconsin

Area
  - Total: 28.6 sq mi (74.2 km^{2})
  - Land: 28.5 sq mi (73.8 km^{2})
  - Water: 0.15 sq mi (0.4 km^{2})
- Elevation: 1,120 ft (340 m)

Population (2000)
  - Total: 119
  - Density: 4.1/sq mi (1.6/km^{2})
- Time zone: UTC-6 (Central (CST))
  - Summer (DST): UTC-5 (CDT)
- FIPS code: 27-02800
- GNIS feature ID: 0663478

Augusta Township is a township in Lac qui Parle County, Minnesota, United States. The population was 119 at the 2000 census.

Augusta Township was organized in 1880, and named after Augusta, Wisconsin, the native home of a large share of the early settlers.

== Geography ==
According to the United States Census Bureau, the township has a total area of 28.7 square miles (74 km^{2}), of which 28.5 square miles (74 km^{2}) is land and 0.2 square miles (0.52 km^{2}) (0.52%) is water.

== Demographics ==
As of the census of 2000, there were 119 people, 52 households, and 39 families residing in the township. The population density was 4.2 inhabitants per square mile (1.6/km^{2}). There were 62 housing units at an average density of 2.2 per square mile (0.85/km^{2}). The racial makeup of the township was 100.00% White.

There were 52 households, out of which 23.1% had children under the age of 18 living with them, 67.3% were married couples living together, 1.9% had a female householder with no husband present, and 25.0% were non-families. 19.2% of all households were made up of individuals, and 13.5% had someone living alone who was 65 years of age or older. The average household size was 2.29 and the average family size was 2.64.

In the township the population was spread out, with 16.8% under the age of 18, 5.9% from 18 to 24, 15.1% from 25 to 44, 39.5% from 45 to 64, and 22.7% who were 65 years of age or older. The median age was 50 years. For every 100 females, there were 124.5 males. For every 100 females age 18 and over, there were 110.6 males.

The median income for a household in the township was $39,375, and the median income for a family was $41,563. Males had a median income of $27,500 versus $20,000 for females. The per capita income for the township was $15,506. There were 2.9% of families and 7.4% of the population living below the poverty line, including no under eighteens and 6.3% of those over 64.
