= Freeland Township, Lac qui Parle County, Minnesota =

Freeland Township, Minnesota
- Township
- Location within the state of Minnesota Freeland Township, Minnesota (the United States)
- Coordinates: 44°51′17″N 96°16′6″W
- Country: United States
- State: Minnesota
- County: Lac qui Parle

Area
  - Total: 36.4 sq mi (94.4 km^{2})
  - Land: 36.4 sq mi (94.4 km^{2})
  - Water: 0 sq mi (0.0 km^{2})
- Elevation: 1,122 ft (342 m)

Population (2000)
  - Total: 127
  - Density: 3.4/sq mi (1.3/km^{2})
- Time zone: UTC-6 (Central (CST))
  - Summer (DST): UTC-5 (CDT)
- FIPS code: 27-22616
- GNIS feature ID: 0664226

Freeland Township is a township in Lac qui Parle County, Minnesota, United States. The population was 127 at the 2000 census.

Freeland Township was organized in 1880, and named for J. P. Free, an early settler.

== Geography ==
According to the United States Census Bureau, the township has a total area of 36.4 square miles (94 km^{2}), all land.

== Demographics ==
As of the census of 2000, there were 127 people, 50 households, and 34 families residing in the township. The population density was 3.5 inhabitants per square mile (1.4/km^{2}). There were 61 housing units at an average density of 1.7 per square mile (0.66/km^{2}). The racial makeup of the township was 98.43% White, 0.79% Native American and 0.79% Asian.

There were 50 households, out of which 28.0% had children under the age of 18 living with them, 56.0% were married couples living together, 4.0% had a female householder with no husband present, and 32.0% were non-families. 28.0% of all households were made up of individuals, and 14.0% had someone living alone who was 65 years of age or older. The average household size was 2.54 and the average family size was 3.18.

In the township the population was spread out, with 23.6% under the age of 18, 12.6% from 18 to 24, 19.7% from 25 to 44, 28.3% from 45 to 64, and 15.7% who were 65 years of age or older. The median age was 42 years. For every 100 females, there were 144.2 males. For every 100 females age 18 and over, there were 155.3 males.

The median income for a household in the township was $30,000, and the median income for a family was $37,750. Males had a median income of $26,667 versus $19,375 for females. The per capita income for the township was $14,059. There were 22.0% of families and 21.7% of the population living below the poverty line, including 35.7% of under eighteens and 11.8% of those over 64.
