= Mehurin Township, Lac qui Parle County, Minnesota =

Mehurin Township, Minnesota
- Township
- Location within the state of Minnesota Mehurin Township, Minnesota (the United States)
- Coordinates: 44°55′32″N 96°24′4″W
- Country: United States
- State: Minnesota
- County: Lac qui Parle

Area
  - Total: 29.0 sq mi (75.2 km^{2})
  - Land: 28.6 sq mi (74.2 km^{2})
  - Water: 0.39 sq mi (1.0 km^{2})
- Elevation: 1,132 ft (345 m)

Population (2000)
  - Total: 103
  - Density: 3.6/sq mi (1.4/km^{2})
- Time zone: UTC-6 (Central (CST))
  - Summer (DST): UTC-5 (CDT)
- FIPS code: 27-41516
- GNIS feature ID: 0664951

Mehurin Township is a township in Lac qui Parle County, Minnesota, United States. The population was 103 at the 2000 census.

Mehurin Township was organized in 1879, and named for the family of Amasa Mehurin, a pioneer settler.

== Geography ==
According to the United States Census Bureau, the township has a total area of 29.0 square miles (75.2 km^{2}), of which 28.7 square miles (74.3 km^{2}) is land and 0.4 square mile (1.0 km^{2}) (1.31%) is water.

== Demographics ==
As of the census of 2000, there were 103 people, 44 households, and 33 families residing in the township. The population density was 3.6 inhabitants per square mile (1.4/km^{2}). There were 51 housing units at an average density of 1.8 per square mile (0.69/km^{2}). The racial makeup of the township was 100.00% White.

There were 44 households, out of which 29.5% had children under the age of 18 living with them, 68.2% were married couples living together, 2.3% had a female householder with no husband present, and 25.0% were non-families. 22.7% of all households were made up of individuals, and 4.5% had someone living alone who was 65 years of age or older. The average household size was 2.34 and the average family size was 2.67.

In the township the population was spread out, with 24.3% under the age of 18, 6.8% from 18 to 24, 27.2% from 25 to 44, 28.2% from 45 to 64, and 13.6% who were 65 years of age or older. The median age was 40 years. For every 100 females, there were 98.1 males. For every 100 females age 18 and over, there were 110.8 males.

The median income for a household in the township was $30,625, and the median income for a family was $46,250. Males had a median income of $10,625 versus $15,000 for females. The per capita income for the township was $19,870. There were 20.6% of families and 26.5% of the population living below the poverty line, including 21.1% of under eighteens and 14.3% of those over 64.
