= Harold Windingstad =

American politician and farmer

Born	August 26, 1929
Place of Birth	Providence Township; Lac qui Parle County, Minnesota
Died	November 18, 2006
Place of Death	Dawson, Minnesota
Spouse	Dolores
Profession	farmer, political activist, community organizer
Political Affiliation	Minnesota Democratic-Farmer-Labor Party
Years Active	1955–2005

Harold Oliver Windingstad Jr. (August 26, 1929 – November 18, 2006) was an American politician and farmer from Minnesota, and a member of the Minnesota Democratic-Farmer-Labor Party.

== Political "go to" man ==
Windingstad lived his entire life on his family's farm in Providence Township in Lac qui Parle County. A populist, he had grass roots political experience and an "uncanny sense of community." He was considered the man in southwestern Minnesota to whom candidates turned for advice, fundraising and get-out-the-vote efforts. His knowledge of the political landscape defined strategies for many local and state-wide races through the years.

== DFL Party leader ==
Windingstad served as chair of the 2nd Congressional District DFL for nearly twenty years, and was a delegate to two Democratic national conventions. He is credited with helping the Minnesota delegation come together after Jimmy Carter won the endorsement for President in 1976, saying of the Georgia governor: "Looks like a nice young man. He might go someplace." After handing his 2nd District chair position over to Jonette Engan in 1989, the district chose to honor him by establishing an annual golf tournament in Willmar known as the Windingstad Open. The event attracted golfers and political leaders from throughout the region each August.

== Farmers Union leader and public service ==
In 1987, Windingstad won the Hubert Humphrey Award for his dedication to and leadership in the Democratic-Farmer-Labor Party. A leader in the Minnesota Farmers Union and chair of the local chapter for many years, he, along with his wife, Dolores, received the inaugural Minnesota Farmers Union Lifetime Achievement Award in 2005. He served on the Southwest Minnesota Housing Partnership (SWHP) Board from its inception in 1992 until his death, and also served four terms on the Minnesota Board on Aging. He was also a member of the Prairie Five Community Action Council Board for over 25 years.
