= Providence Township, Lac qui Parle County, Minnesota =

Providence Township
- Township
- Location within the state of Minnesota Providence Township (the United States)
- Coordinates: 44°50′30″N 96°9′52″W
- Country: United States
- State: Minnesota
- County: Lac qui Parle

Area
  - Total: 36.1 sq mi (93.5 km^{2})
  - Land: 36.1 sq mi (93.5 km^{2})
  - Water: 0 sq mi (0.0 km^{2})
- Elevation: 1,102 ft (336 m)

Population (2000)
  - Total: 186
  - Density: 5.2/sq mi (2/km^{2})
- Time zone: UTC-6 (Central (CST))
  - Summer (DST): UTC-5 (CDT)
- FIPS code: 27-52702
- GNIS feature ID: 665363

Providence Township is a township in Lac qui Parle County, Minnesota, United States. The population was 186 at the 2000 census.

Providence Township was organized in 1878, and named after Providence, Rhode Island.

== Geography ==
According to the United States Census Bureau, the township has an area of 36.1 square miles (93 km^{2}), of which 36.1 square miles (93 km^{2}) is land and 0.03% water.

The Lac qui Parle River runs through the township.

== Locations ==
=== Providence State Wildlife Management Area ===
The Providence State Wildlife Management Area is located inside Providence Township. It has an area of 228.24 acres and a perimeter of 3.79 miles. Deer, small game, pheasants, and waterfowl inhabit the area.

=== Other Locations ===
- Providence Valley Lutheran Church
- Todd's Farm Hydraulics

== Demographics ==
As of the census of 2000, there were 186 people, 71 households, and 56 families residing in the township. The population density was 5.2 people per square mile (2.0/km^{2}). There were 76 housing units at an average density of 2.1/sq mi (0.8/km^{2}). The racial makeup of the township was 100.00% White.

There were 71 households, out of which 28.2% had children under the age of 18 living with them, 76.1% were married couples living together, 1.4% had a female householder with no husband present, and 21.1% were non-families. 18.3% of all households were made up of individuals, and 9.9% had someone living alone who was 65 years of age or older. The average household size was 2.62 and the average family size was 3.00.

In the township, the population was spread out, with 24.7% under the age of 18, 7.0% from 18 to 24, 17.2% from 25 to 44, 34.9% from 45 to 64, and 16.1% who were 65 years of age or older. The median age was 45 years. For every 100 females, there were 109.0 males. For every 100 females age 18 and over, there were 118.8 males.

The median income for a household in the township was $45,313, and the median income for a family was $50,833. Males had a median income of $26,964 versus $22,292 for females. The per capita income for the township was $19,254. About 4.3% of families and 10.5% of the population were below the poverty line, including 27.3% of those under the age of eighteen and none of those 65 or over.

== Notable person ==
- Harold Windingstad - American politician and farmer

== Communities ==
The town of Providence is the only community in Providence Township. It lies on the intersection of 265th Avenue and 120th Street.
