= Hamlin Township, Lac qui Parle County, Minnesota =

Hamlin Township, Minnesota
- Township
- Location within the state of Minnesota Hamlin Township, Minnesota (the United States)
- Coordinates: 44°55′41″N 96°9′20″W
- Country: United States
- State: Minnesota
- County: Lac qui Parle

Area
  - Total: 36.1 sq mi (93.5 km^{2})
  - Land: 35.9 sq mi (92.9 km^{2})
  - Water: 0.19 sq mi (0.5 km^{2})
- Elevation: 1,093 ft (333 m)

Population (2000)
  - Total: 185
  - Density: 5.2/sq mi (2/km^{2})
- Time zone: UTC-6 (Central (CST))
  - Summer (DST): UTC-5 (CDT)
- FIPS code: 27-26774
- GNIS feature ID: 0664380

Hamlin Township is a township in Lac qui Parle County, Minnesota, United States. The population was 185 at the 2000 census.

Hamlin Township was organized in 1879, and named for John R. Hamlin, a pioneer settler.

== Geography ==
According to the United States Census Bureau, the township has a total area of 36.1 square miles (93 km^{2}), of which 35.9 square miles (93 km^{2}) is land and 0.2 square miles (0.52 km^{2}) (0.58%) is water.

== Demographics ==
As of the census of 2000, there were 185 people, 69 households, and 58 families residing in the township. The population density was 5.2 inhabitants per square mile (2.0/km^{2}). There were 84 housing units at an average density of 2.3 per square mile (0.89/km^{2}). The racial makeup of the township was 100.00% White.

There were 69 households, out of which 30.4% had children under the age of 18 living with them, 76.8% were married couples living together, 1.4% had a female householder with no husband present, and 15.9% were non-families. 14.5% of all households were made up of individuals, and 4.3% had someone living alone who was 65 years of age or older. The average household size was 2.68 and the average family size was 2.98.

In the township the population was spread out, with 29.2% under the age of 18, 1.6% from 18 to 24, 27.6% from 25 to 44, 24.3% from 45 to 64, and 17.3% who were 65 years of age or older. The median age was 40 years. For every 100 females, there were 120.2 males. For every 100 females age 18 and over, there were 122.0 males.

The median income for a household in the township was $30,833, and the median income for a family was $31,563. Males had a median income of $19,375 versus $18,125 for females. The per capita income for the township was $15,948. About 8.5% of families and 8.8% of the population were below the poverty line, including 8.0% of those under the age of eighteen and none of those 65 or over.
