= Madison Township, Lac qui Parle County, Minnesota =

Madison Township, Minnesota
- Township
- Location within the state of Minnesota Madison Township, Minnesota (the United States)
- Coordinates: 45°1′17″N 96°10′32″W
- Country: United States
- State: Minnesota
- County: Lac qui Parle

Area
  - Total: 34.9 sq mi (90.5 km^{2})
  - Land: 34.6 sq mi (89.6 km^{2})
  - Water: 0.39 sq mi (1.0 km^{2})
- Elevation: 1,070 ft (326 m)

Population (2000)
  - Total: 251
  - Density: 7.3/sq mi (2.8/km^{2})
- Time zone: UTC-6 (Central (CST))
  - Summer (DST): UTC-5 (CDT)
- ZIP code: 56256
- Area code: 320
- FIPS code: 27-39284
- GNIS feature ID: 0664871

Madison Township is a township in Lac qui Parle County, Minnesota, United States. The population was 251 at the 2000 census.

Madison Township was organized in 1879, and named after Madison, Wisconsin.

== Geography ==
According to the United States Census Bureau, the township has a total area of 35.0 square miles (90.5 km^{2}), of which 34.6 square miles (89.6 km^{2}) is land and 0.4 square mile (1.0 km^{2}) (1.06%) is water.

== Demographics ==
As of the census of 2000, there were 251 people, 93 households, and 71 families residing in the township. The population density was 7.3 inhabitants per square mile (2.8/km^{2}). There were 95 housing units at an average density of 2.7 per square mile (1.0/km^{2}). The racial makeup of the township was 99.60% White and 0.40% Asian.

There were 93 households, out of which 36.6% had children under the age of 18 living with them, 72.0% were married couples living together, 2.2% had a female householder with no husband present, and 22.6% were non-families. 19.4% of all households were made up of individuals, and 9.7% had someone living alone who was 65 years of age or older. The average household size was 2.70 and the average family size was 3.11.

In the township, the population was spread out, with 29.1% under the age of 18, 4.4% from 18 to 24, 25.1% from 25 to 44, 25.5% from 45 to 64, and 15.9% who were 65 years of age or older. The median age was 41 years. For every 100 females, there were 126.1 males. For every 100 females age 18 and over, there were 111.9 males.

The median income for a household in the township was $38,750, and the median income for a family was $41,607. Males had a median income of $30,000 versus $21,250 for females. The per capita income for the township was $16,039. None of the families and 3.0% of the population were living below the poverty line, including no under eighteens and 7.5% of those over 64.
