= Perry Township, Lac qui Parle County, Minnesota =

Perry Township, Minnesota
- Township
- Location within the state of Minnesota Perry Township, Minnesota (the United States)
- Coordinates: 45°6′49″N 96°17′54″W
- Country: United States
- State: Minnesota
- County: Lac qui Parle

Area
  - Total: 37.0 sq mi (95.8 km^{2})
  - Land: 36.9 sq mi (95.5 km^{2})
  - Water: 0.12 sq mi (0.3 km^{2})
- Elevation: 1,056 ft (322 m)

Population (2000)
  - Total: 137
  - Density: 3.6/sq mi (1.4/km^{2})
- Time zone: UTC-6 (Central (CST))
  - Summer (DST): UTC-5 (CDT)
- FIPS code: 27-50524
- GNIS feature ID: 0665287

Perry Township is a township in Lac qui Parle County, Minnesota, United States. The population was 137 at the 2000 census.

Perry Township was organized in 1880, and settled by pioneers, of whom many were natives of Perry, Wisconsin.

== Geography ==
According to the United States Census Bureau, the township has a total area of 37.0 square miles (95.8 km^{2}), of which 36.9 square miles (95.5 km^{2}) is land and 0.1 square mile (0.3 km^{2}) (0.35%) is water.

== Demographics ==
As of the census of 2000, there were 137 people, 49 households, and 36 families residing in the township. The population density was 3.7 people per square mile (1.4/km^{2}). There were 59 housing units at an average density of 1.6/sq mi (0.6/km^{2}). The racial makeup of the township was 97.81% White, 0.73% African American, 0.73% Asian, and 0.73% from two or more races. Hispanic or Latino of any race were 0.73% of the population.

There were 49 households, out of which 40.8% had children under the age of 18 living with them, 65.3% were married couples living together, 4.1% had a female householder with no husband present, and 24.5% were non-families. 24.5% of all households were made up of individuals, and 14.3% had someone living alone who was 65 years of age or older. The average household size was 2.80 and the average family size was 3.38.

In the township the population was spread out, with 34.3% under the age of 18, 5.8% from 18 to 24, 25.5% from 25 to 44, 19.7% from 45 to 64, and 14.6% who were 65 years of age or older. The median age was 37 years. For every 100 females, there were 158.5 males. For every 100 females age 18 and over, there were 130.8 males.

The median income for a household in the township was $30,833, and the median income for a family was $33,750. Males had a median income of $27,375 versus $17,500 for females. The per capita income for the township was $16,788. There were 4.8% of families and 7.2% of the population living below the poverty line, including 11.6% of under eighteens and none of those over 64.
