= Nassau, Minnesota =

City in Minnesota, United States

Nassau
- City
- Location of Nassau, Minnesota
- Coordinates: 45°04′04″N 96°26′30″W
- Country: United States
- State: Minnesota
- County: Lac qui Parle

Area
  - Total: 0.16 sq mi (0.41 km^{2})
  - Land: 0.16 sq mi (0.41 km^{2})
  - Water: 0 sq mi (0.00 km^{2})
- Elevation: 1,116 ft (340 m)

Population (2020)
  - Total: 65
  - Density: 409.1/sq mi (157.97/km^{2})
- Time zone: UTC-6 (Central (CST))
  - Summer (DST): UTC-5 (CDT)
- ZIP code: 56257
- Area code: 320
- FIPS code: 27-45016
- GNIS feature ID: 2395158

Nassau (/ˈnæsɔː/ NASS-aw) is a city in Lac qui Parle County, Minnesota, United States. The population was 65 at the 2020 census.

== History ==
A post office called Nassau was established in 1888, and remained in operation until it was discontinued in 1998. Nassau was platted in 1893.

== Geography ==
According to the United States Census Bureau, the city has a total area of 0.16 square miles (0.41 km^{2}), all land.

== Demographics ==
Historical population
Census	Pop.	Note	%±
1900	134		—
1910	213		59.0%
1920	168		−21.1%
1930	170		1.2%
1940	208		22.4%
1950	205		−1.4%
1960	182		−11.2%
1970	126		−30.8%
1980	115		−8.7%
1990	83		−27.8%
2000	83		0.0%
2010	72		−13.3%
2020	65		−9.7%
U.S. Decennial Census

=== 2010 census ===
As of the census of 2010, there were 72 people, 35 households, and 19 families living in the city. The population density was 450.0 inhabitants per square mile (173.7/km^{2}). There were 42 housing units at an average density of 262.5 per square mile (101.4/km^{2}). The racial makeup of the city was 100.0% White.

There were 35 households, of which 20.0% had children under the age of 18 living with them, 51.4% were married couples living together, 2.9% had a female householder with no husband present, and 45.7% were non-families. 40.0% of all households were made up of individuals, and 20% had someone living alone who was 65 years of age or older. The average household size was 2.06 and the average family size was 2.79.

The median age in the city was 54.2 years. 18.1% of residents were under the age of 18; 0% were between the ages of 18 and 24; 18.1% were from 25 to 44; 38.9% were from 45 to 64; and 25% were 65 years of age or older. The gender makeup of the city was 52.8% male and 47.2% female.

=== 2000 census ===
As of the census of 2000, there were 83 people, 41 households, and 20 families living in the city. The population density was 524.8 inhabitants per square mile (202.6/km^{2}). There were 47 housing units at an average density of 297.2 per square mile (114.7/km^{2}). The racial makeup of the city was 95.18% White, 2.41% Native American and 2.41% Asian. Hispanic or Latino of any race were 2.41% of the population.

There were 41 households, out of which 22.0% had children under the age of 18 living with them, 39.0% were married couples living together, 4.9% had a female householder with no husband present, and 51.2% were non-families. 43.9% of all households were made up of individuals, and 19.5% had someone living alone who was 65 years of age or older. The average household size was 2.02 and the average family size was 2.85.

In the city, the population was spread out, with 19.3% under the age of 18, 1.2% from 18 to 24, 28.9% from 25 to 44, 31.3% from 45 to 64, and 19.3% who were 65 years of age or older. The median age was 45 years. For every 100 females, there were 112.8 males. For every 100 females age 18 and over, there were 116.1 males.

The median income for a household in the city was $27,500, and the median income for a family was $41,042. Males had a median income of $29,375 versus $16,250 for females. The per capita income for the city was $12,748. There were 9.5% of families and 12.0% of the population living below the poverty line, including no under eighteens and 10.5% of those over 64.
