= Lac qui Parle Township, Lac qui Parle County, Minnesota =

Lac qui Parle Township, Minnesota
- Township
- Location within the state of Minnesota Lac qui Parle Township, Minnesota (the United States)
- Coordinates: 45°0′36″N 95°54′54″W
- Country: United States
- State: Minnesota
- County: Lac qui Parle

Area
  - Total: 31.5 sq mi (81.6 km^{2})
  - Land: 28.7 sq mi (74.4 km^{2})
  - Water: 2.8 sq mi (7.2 km^{2})
- Elevation: 1,010 ft (308 m)

Population (2000)
  - Total: 183
  - Density: 6.5/sq mi (2.5/km^{2})
- Time zone: UTC-6 (Central (CST))
  - Summer (DST): UTC-5 (CDT)
- FIPS code: 27-33848
- GNIS feature ID: 0664650

Lac qui Parle Township (/læk kiː ˈpɑːrl/ LAK KEE PARL) is a township in Lac qui Parle County, Minnesota, United States. The population was 183 at the 2000 census.

Lac qui Parle Township was organized in 1873, and named for the county in which it is located.

== Geography ==
According to the United States Census Bureau, the township has a total area of 31.5 square miles (82 km^{2}), of which 28.7 square miles (74 km^{2}) is land and 2.8 square miles (7.3 km^{2}) (8.79%) is water.

== Demographics ==
As of the census of 2000, there were 183 people, 69 households, and 54 families residing in the township. The population density was 6.4 inhabitants per square mile (2.5/km^{2}). There were 103 housing units at an average density of 3.6 per square mile (1.4/km^{2}). The racial makeup of the township was 100.00% White.

There were 69 households, out of which 40.6% had children under the age of 18 living with them, 75.4% were married couples living together, 1.4% had a female householder with no husband present, and 21.7% were non-families. 20.3% of all households were made up of individuals, and 5.8% had someone living alone who was 65 years of age or older. The average household size was 2.65 and the average family size was 3.09.

In the township the population was spread out, with 29.5% under the age of 18, 6.0% from 18 to 24, 24.6% from 25 to 44, 29.0% from 45 to 64, and 10.9% who were 65 years of age or older. The median age was 40 years. For every 100 females, there were 98.9 males. For every 100 females age 18 and over, there were 108.1 males.

The median income for a household in the township was $33,906, and the median income for a family was $38,750. Males had a median income of $31,667 versus $21,875 for females. The per capita income for the township was $16,769. About 11.5% of families and 15.0% of the population were below the poverty line, including 18.4% of those under the age of eighteen and 9.5% of those 65 or over.

== Notable people ==
- Theodore Christianson - 21st governor of Minnesota; born in Lac qui Parle Township
- John Poage Williamson - American missionary, politician, and writer
