= Baxter Township, Lac qui Parle County, Minnesota =

Baxter Township, Minnesota
- Township
- Location within the state of Minnesota Baxter Township, Minnesota (the United States)
- Coordinates: 44°55′33″N 95°54′31″W
- Country: United States
- State: Minnesota
- County: Lac qui Parle

Area
  - Total: 35.9 sq mi (93.1 km^{2})
  - Land: 35.9 sq mi (92.9 km^{2})
  - Water: 0.077 sq mi (0.2 km^{2})
- Elevation: 1,040 ft (317 m)

Population (2000)
  - Total: 209
  - Density: 5.7/sq mi (2.2/km^{2})
- Time zone: UTC-6 (Central (CST))
  - Summer (DST): UTC-5 (CDT)
- FIPS code: 27-04060
- GNIS feature ID: 0663526

Baxter Township is a township in Lac qui Parle County, Minnesota, United States. The population was 209 at the 2000 census.

Baxter Township was organized in 1871, and named after Hiram A. Baxter, an early settler.

== Geography ==
According to the United States Census Bureau, the township has a total area of 36.0 square miles (93 km^{2}), of which 35.9 square miles (93 km^{2}) is land and 0.1 square miles (0.26 km^{2}) (0.22%) is water.

== Demographics ==
As of the census of 2000, there were 209 people, 76 households, and 68 families residing in the township. The population density was 5.8 inhabitants per square mile (2.2/km^{2}). There were 82 housing units at an average density of 2.3 per square mile (0.89/km^{2}). The racial makeup of the township was 98.56% White, 0.96% from other races, and 0.48% from two or more races. Hispanic or Latino of any race were 0.96% of the population.

There were 76 households, out of which 35.5% had children under the age of 18 living with them, 81.6% were married couples living together, 5.3% had a female householder with no husband present, and 10.5% were non-families. 9.2% of all households were made up of individuals, and 2.6% had someone living alone who was 65 years of age or older. The average household size was 2.75 and the average family size was 2.94.

In the township the population was spread out, with 28.2% under the age of 18, 4.3% from 18 to 24, 24.9% from 25 to 44, 26.8% from 45 to 64, and 15.8% who were 65 years of age or older. The median age was 38 years. For every 100 females, there were 101.0 males. For every 100 females age 18 and over, there were 100.0 males.

The median income for a household in the township was $40,417, and the median income for a family was $40,521. Males had a median income of $32,292 versus $15,313 for females. The per capita income for the township was $15,622. About 11.6% of families and 11.4% of the population were below the poverty line, including 13.1% of those under the age of eighteen and 8.3% of those 65 or over.
