= Madison, Minnesota =

City in Minnesota, United States

Madison
- City
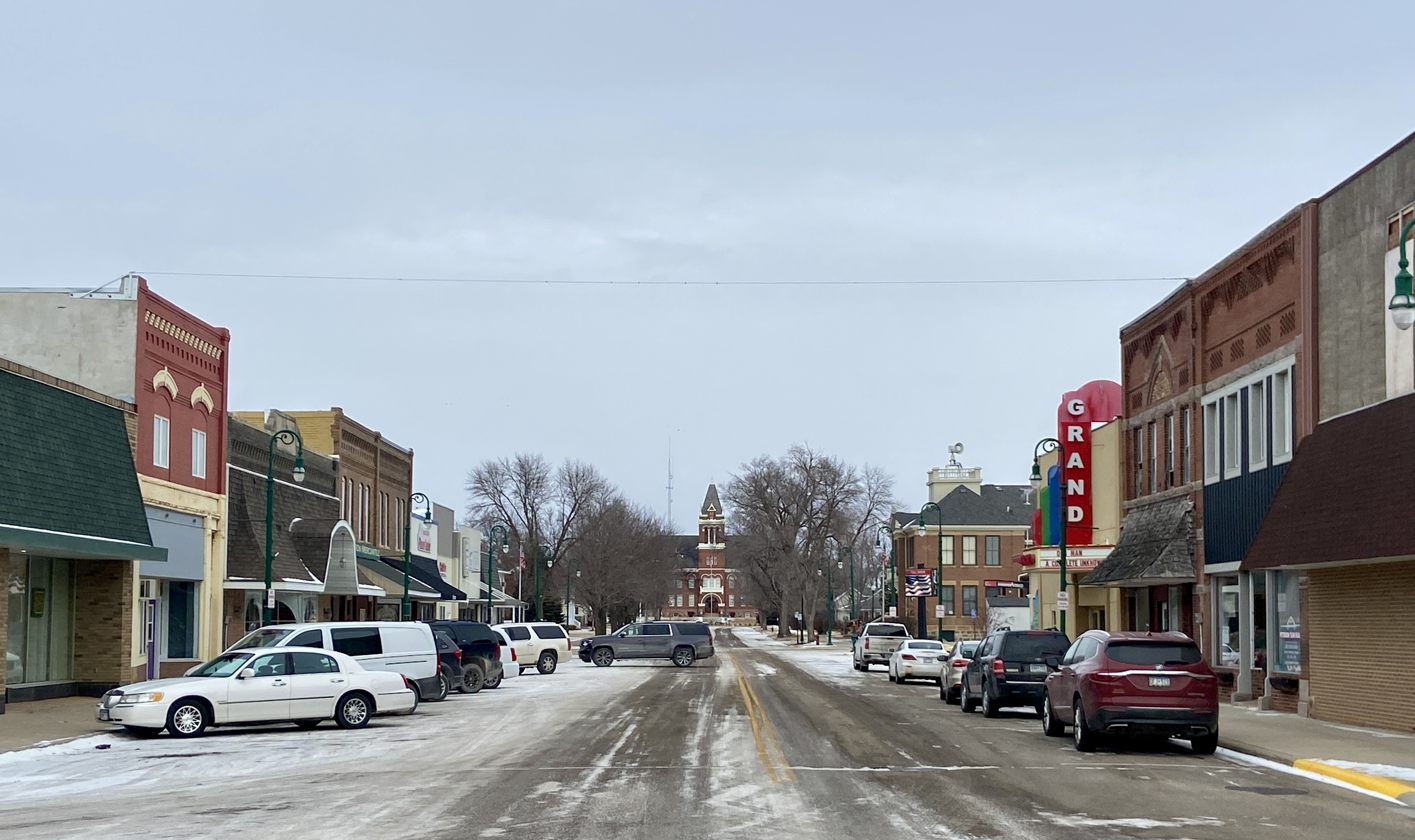
- 6th Avenue looking toward Courthouse
- Nickname: Lutefisk Capital of the USA
- Location of Madison within Lac qui Parle County and state of Minnesota
- Coordinates: 45°00′46″N 96°11′21″W
- Country: United States
- State: Minnesota
- County: Lac qui Parle
- Named for: Madison, Wisconsin

Government
  - Type: Mayor–council government
  - Mayor: Maynard Meyer
  - Governing body: Madison City Council

Area
  - Total: 1.05 sq mi (2.72 km^{2})
  - Land: 1.05 sq mi (2.72 km^{2})
  - Water: 0 sq mi (0.00 km^{2})
- Elevation: 1,089 ft (332 m)

Population (2020)
  - Total: 1,518
  - Density: 1,445.9/sq mi (558.28/km^{2})
- Time zone: UTC-6 (Central (CST))
  - Summer (DST): UTC-5 (CDT)
- ZIP code: 56256
- Area code: 320
- FIPS code: 27-39266
- GNIS feature ID: 2395807
- Website: ci.madison.mn.us

Madison is a city in and the county seat of Lac qui Parle County, Minnesota, United States, along the 45th parallel. The population was 1,518 at the 2020 census. It proclaims itself to be the "lutefisk capital of the USA."

== History ==
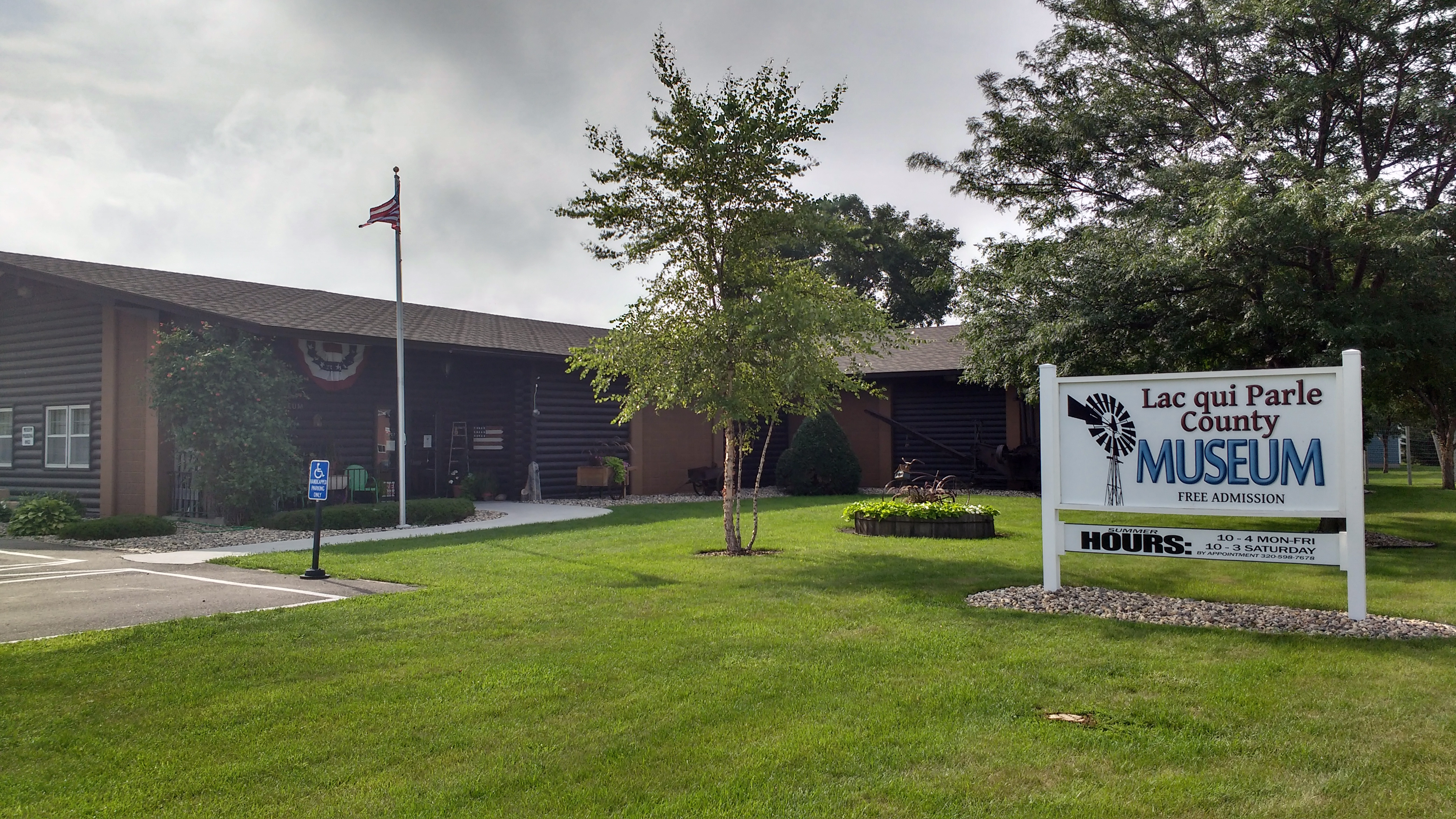
Lac qui Parle History Center

Madison was platted in 1884, and named after Madison, Wisconsin. A post office has been in operation at Madison since 1884.

The Madison City Council proposed that the city should be named the Lutefisk Capital of the United States in 1982, and the Madison Chamber of Commerce funded the construction of a 25 ft (7.6 m) fiberglass cod nicknamed Lou T. Fisk, which welcomes visitors.

== Geography ==
According to the United States Census Bureau, the city has a total area of 1.05 square miles (2.72 km^{2}), all land.

U.S. Highway 75 and Minnesota State Highway 40 are two of the main routes in the city.

== Climate ==
According to the Köppen Climate Classification system, Madison has a hot-summer humid continental climate, abbreviated "Dfa" on climate maps. The hottest temperature recorded in Madison was 110 °F (43.3 °C) on July 31, 1988 and August 1, 1988, while the coldest temperature recorded was −36 °F (−37.8 °C) on February 9, 1994.

Climate data for Madison, Minnesota, 1991–2020 normals, extremes 1940–present
Month	Jan	Feb	Mar	Apr	May	Jun	Jul	Aug	Sep	Oct	Nov	Dec	Year
Record high °F (°C)	67 (19)	66 (19)	84 (29)	96 (36)	102 (39)	105 (41)	110 (43)	110 (43)	100 (38)	96 (36)	81 (27)	63 (17)	110 (43)
Mean maximum °F (°C)	44.3 (6.8)	47.8 (8.8)	64.0 (17.8)	81.0 (27.2)	90.8 (32.7)	94.2 (34.6)	94.0 (34.4)	92.1 (33.4)	89.5 (31.9)	83.7 (28.7)	65.1 (18.4)	48.0 (8.9)	97.3 (36.3)
Mean daily maximum °F (°C)	21.7 (−5.7)	26.3 (−3.2)	38.8 (3.8)	54.6 (12.6)	68.7 (20.4)	78.6 (25.9)	82.5 (28.1)	79.7 (26.5)	73.1 (22.8)	58.3 (14.6)	41.0 (5.0)	26.9 (−2.8)	54.2 (12.3)
Daily mean °F (°C)	12.2 (−11.0)	16.5 (−8.6)	29.2 (−1.6)	43.8 (6.6)	57.6 (14.2)	68.1 (20.1)	71.9 (22.2)	68.9 (20.5)	61.1 (16.2)	46.9 (8.3)	31.6 (−0.2)	18.1 (−7.7)	43.8 (6.6)
Mean daily minimum °F (°C)	2.6 (−16.3)	6.8 (−14.0)	19.7 (−6.8)	32.9 (0.5)	46.5 (8.1)	57.7 (14.3)	61.3 (16.3)	58.1 (14.5)	49.1 (9.5)	35.6 (2.0)	22.2 (−5.4)	9.3 (−12.6)	33.5 (0.8)
Mean minimum °F (°C)	−19.6 (−28.7)	−14.6 (−25.9)	−4.6 (−20.3)	17.9 (−7.8)	31.6 (−0.2)	45.4 (7.4)	49.3 (9.6)	45.6 (7.6)	32.7 (0.4)	19.0 (−7.2)	2.6 (−16.3)	−13.4 (−25.2)	−22.6 (−30.3)
Record low °F (°C)	−35 (−37)	−36 (−38)	−23 (−31)	0 (−18)	20 (−7)	32 (0)	40 (4)	34 (1)	17 (−8)	4 (−16)	−18 (−28)	−35 (−37)	−36 (−38)
Average precipitation inches (mm)	0.54 (14)	0.60 (15)	1.30 (33)	2.39 (61)	3.21 (82)	3.82 (97)	3.57 (91)	3.35 (85)	2.64 (67)	2.50 (64)	1.13 (29)	0.59 (15)	25.64 (653)
Average snowfall inches (cm)	7.7 (20)	9.3 (24)	7.7 (20)	5.8 (15)	0.1 (0.25)	0.0 (0.0)	0.0 (0.0)	0.0 (0.0)	0.0 (0.0)	0.9 (2.3)	5.5 (14)	9.9 (25)	46.9 (120.55)
Average extreme snow depth inches (cm)	7.2 (18)	7.4 (19)	8.1 (21)	2.9 (7.4)	0.1 (0.25)	0.0 (0.0)	0.0 (0.0)	0.0 (0.0)	0.0 (0.0)	0.2 (0.51)	3.1 (7.9)	6.1 (15)	13.2 (34)
Average precipitation days (≥ 0.01 in)	4.7	4.6	6.3	8.4	10.4	11.0	9.1	8.4	8.2	7.7	4.4	5.0	88.2
Average snowy days (≥ 0.1 in)	5.2	5.0	3.9	1.6	0.0	0.0	0.0	0.0	0.0	0.5	2.3	5.1	23.6
Source 1: NOAA
Source 2: National Weather Service

== Demographics ==
Historical population
Census	Pop.	Note	%±
1890	625		—
1900	1,386		121.8%
1910	1,811		30.7%
1920	1,838		1.5%
1930	1,916		4.2%
1940	2,312		20.7%
1950	2,303		−0.4%
1960	2,380		3.3%
1970	2,242		−5.8%
1980	2,212		−1.3%
1990	1,951		−11.8%
2000	1,768		−9.4%
2010	1,551		−12.3%
2020	1,518		−2.1%
U.S. Decennial Census; 2020 Census

=== 2020 census ===
As of the 2020 census, Madison had a population of 1,518. The median age was 49.8 years. 19.9% of residents were under the age of 18 and 31.7% of residents were 65 years of age or older. For every 100 females there were 86.7 males, and for every 100 females age 18 and over there were 79.4 males age 18 and over.

0.0% of residents lived in urban areas, while 100.0% lived in rural areas.

There were 714 households in Madison, of which 20.2% had children under the age of 18 living in them. Of all households, 40.3% were married-couple households, 19.5% were households with a male householder and no spouse or partner present, and 33.5% were households with a female householder and no spouse or partner present. About 41.7% of all households were made up of individuals and 23.4% had someone living alone who was 65 years of age or older.

There were 861 housing units, of which 17.1% were vacant. The homeowner vacancy rate was 2.9% and the rental vacancy rate was 17.4%.

Racial composition as of the 2020 census
Race	Number	Percent
White	1,417	93.3%
Black or African American	10	0.7%
American Indian and Alaska Native	3	0.2%
Asian	15	1.0%
Native Hawaiian and Other Pacific Islander	0	0.0%
Some other race	22	1.4%
Two or more races	51	3.4%
Hispanic or Latino (of any race)	52	3.4%

=== 2010 census ===
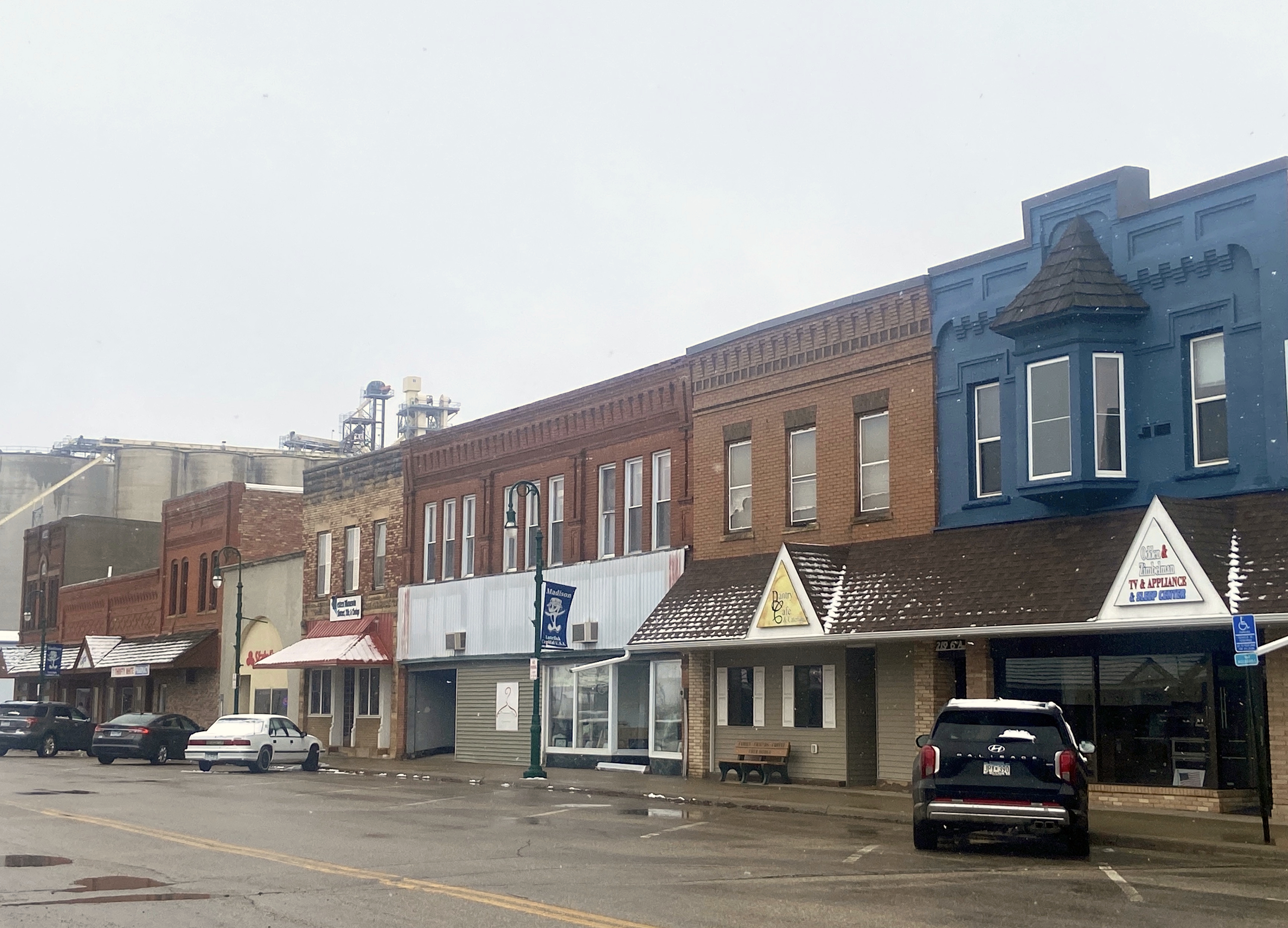
Business district

As of the census of 2010, there were 1,551 people, 736 households, and 404 families living in the city. The population density was 1,477.1 inhabitants per square mile (570.3/km^{2}). There were 873 housing units at an average density of 831.4 per square mile (321.0/km^{2}). The racial makeup of the city was 96.6% White, 0.1% African American, 0.6% Native American, 0.9% Asian, 0.1% from other races, and 1.6% from two or more races. Hispanic or Latino of any race were 1.5% of the population.

There were 736 households, of which 17.9% had children under the age of 18 living with them, 45.2% were married couples living together, 7.2% had a female householder with no husband present, 2.4% had a male householder with no wife present, and 45.1% were non-families. 41.6% of all households were made up of individuals, and 28.4% had someone living alone who was 65 years of age or older. The average household size was 1.99 and the average family size was 2.68.

The median age in the city was 54.6 years. 17% of residents were under the age of 18; 4.9% were between the ages of 18 and 24; 15.3% were from 25 to 44; 27.1% were from 45 to 64; and 35.7% were 65 years of age or older. The gender makeup of the city was 46.0% male and 54.0% female.

=== 2000 census ===
As of the census of 2000, there were 1,768 people, 789 households, and 462 families living in the city. The population density was 1,737.6 inhabitants per square mile (670.9/km^{2}). There were 882 housing units at an average density of 866.9 per square mile (334.7/km^{2}). The racial makeup of the city was 99.21% White, 0.06% African American, 0.23% Asian, and 0.51% from two or more races. Hispanic or Latino of any race were 0.06% of the population.

There were 789 households, out of which 21.7% had children under the age of 18 living with them, 48.9% were married couples living together, 6.0% had a female householder with no husband present, and 41.4% were non-families. 39.0% of all households were made up of individuals, and 28.0% had someone living alone who was 65 years of age or older. The average household size was 2.07 and the average family size was 2.75.

In the city, the population was spread out, with 19.1% under the age of 18, 5.1% from 18 to 24, 17.9% from 25 to 44, 22.1% from 45 to 64, and 35.9% who were 65 years of age or older. The median age was 51 years. For every 100 females, there were 80.0 males. For every 100 females age 18 and over, there were 77.1 males.

The median income for a household in the city was $27,102, and the median income for a family was $38,008. Males had a median income of $27,903 versus $20,694 for females. The per capita income for the city was $17,435. About 3.7% of families and 7.8% of the population were below the poverty line, including 5.1% of those under age 18 and 11.7% of those age 65 or over.

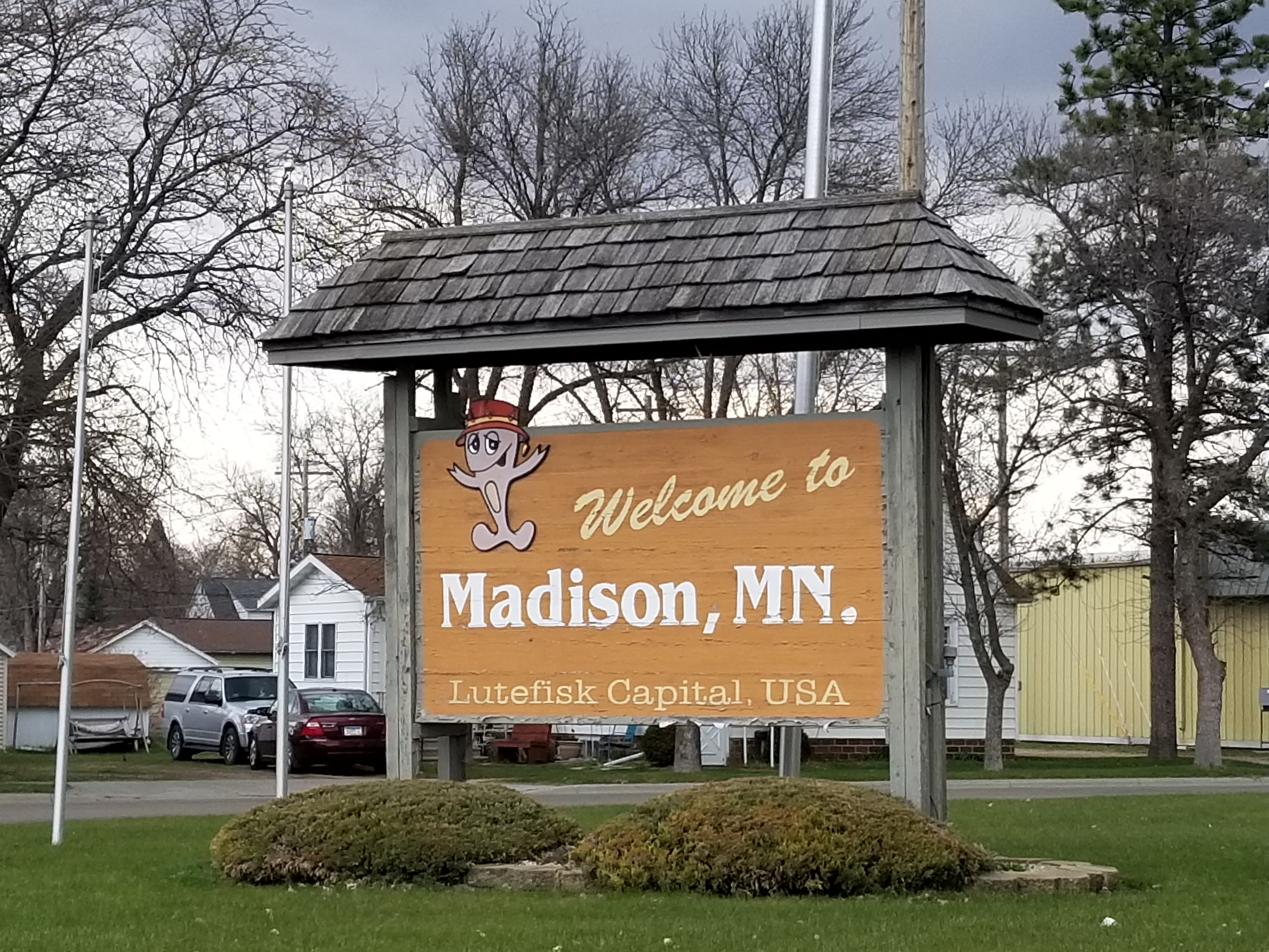
Sign welcoming visitors to Madison featuring a cartoon cod

== Politics ==
Presidential election results 1960–2020

Precinct General Election Results
Year	Republican	Democratic	Third parties
2020	57.5% 488	40.2% 341	2.3% 20
2016	54.1% 445	38.9% 320	7.0% 58
2012	45.0% 365	53.3% 433	1.7% 14
2008	45.2% 405	51.0% 457	3.8% 34
2004	43.4% 422	55.3% 537	1.3% 13
2000	39.6% 400	52.7% 532	7.7% 78
1996	31.4% 306	58.8% 573	9.8% 96
1992	30.4% 335	53.1% 585	16.5% 182
1988	42.5% 474	57.5% 641	0.0% 0
1984	49.3% 576	50.7% 593	0.0% 0
1980	45.0% 569	47.0% 595	8.0% 101
1976	43.4% 550	55.2% 700	1.4% 18
1972	55.2% 653	43.5% 515	1.3% 16
1968	51.8% 603	44.8% 522	3.4% 40
1964	42.1% 486	57.8% 667	0.1% 1
1960	58.0% 713	41.7% 513	0.3% 3

== Education ==
Madison Public Schools are part of the Lac qui Parle Valley School District. Schools in the district include MMN Elementary School, Appleton Elementary School, LqPV Middle School and Lac qui Parle Valley High School.

MMN Elementary School is located in Madison, LqPV Middle School and LqPV High School are located in rural Madison, and Appleton Elementary School is located in Appleton.

Renae Tostenson is the Superintendent of Schools.

== Media ==
Since January 31, 1983, KLQP-FM known as "Q92" has been serving a five-county area from studios in Madison.

== Notable people ==
- Carol Bly (1930–2007) - Award-winning author of short stories, essays and nonfiction.
- Robert Bly (1926–2021) Poet, activist and author of Iron John: A Book About Men (1990).
- Alvin O. Hofstad (1905–1962), farmer and Minnesota state legislator
- Jacob F. Jacobson (1849–1938), member of the Minnesota House of Representatives
- Theodor S. Slen (1885–1986), member of the Minnesota House of Representatives

== In popular culture ==
In 2004, the American independent film Sweet Land was filmed partially in Madison. The film was released in 2005.

== Gallery ==
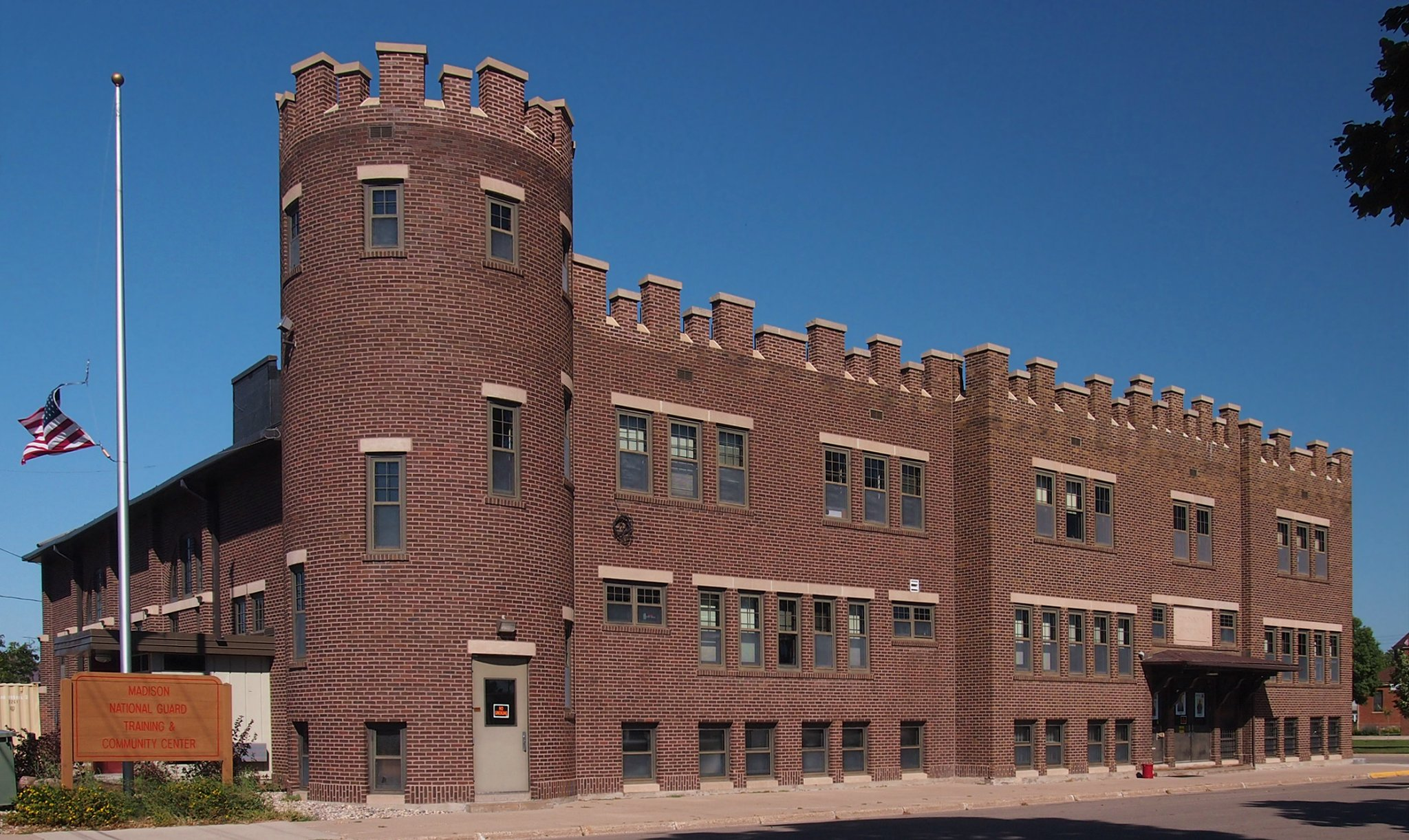
Armory building

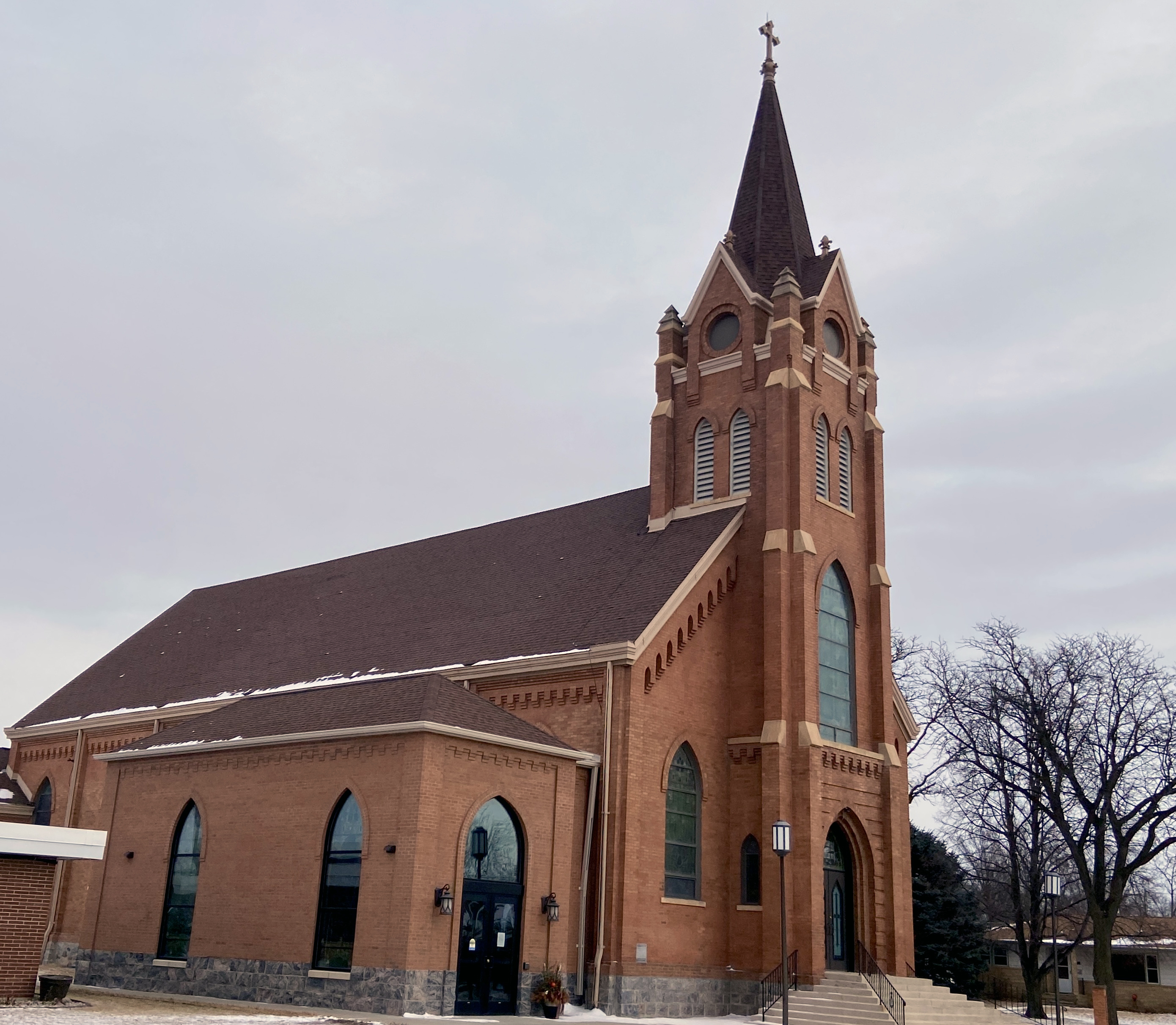
St. Michael's Church

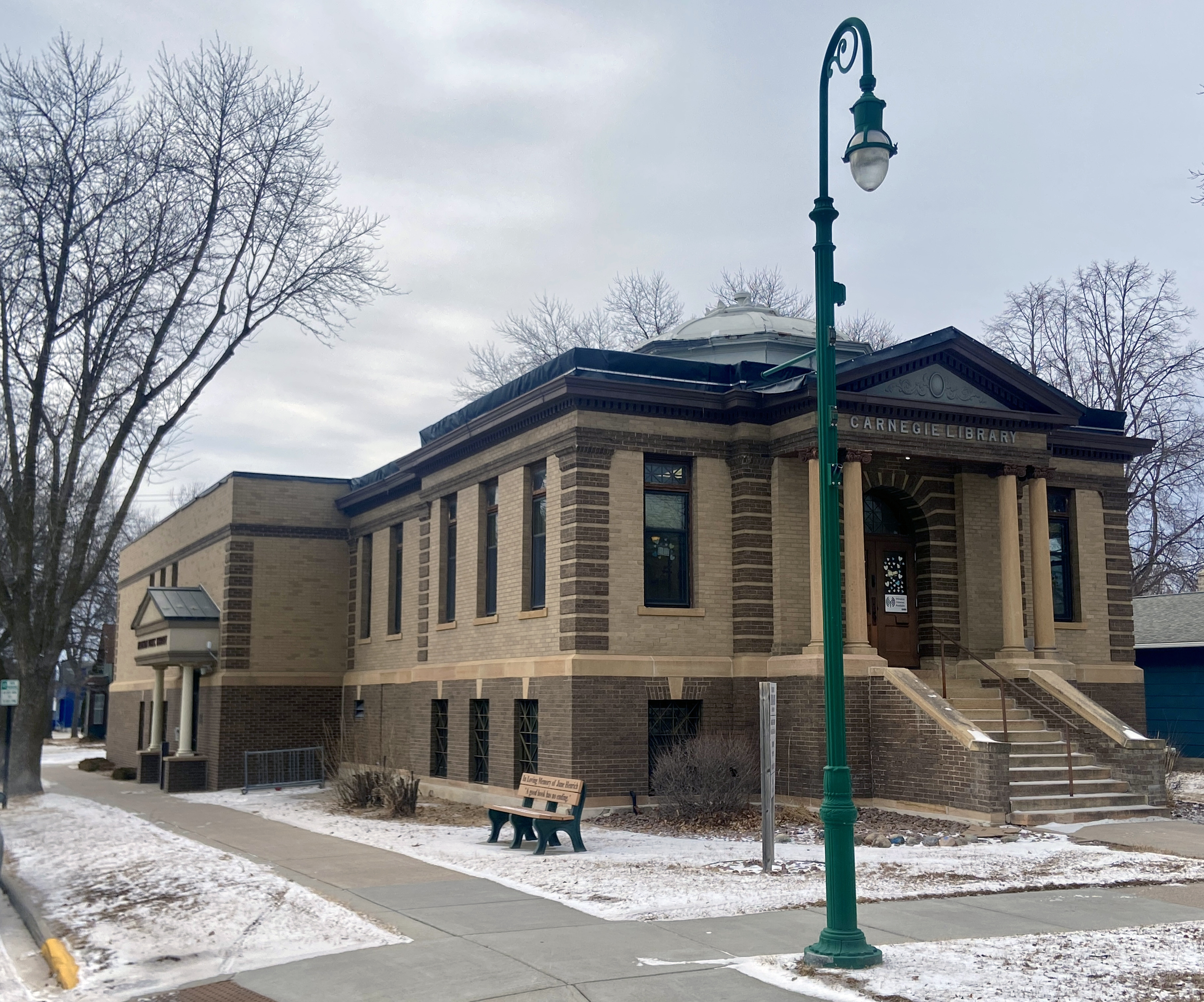
Carnegie Library

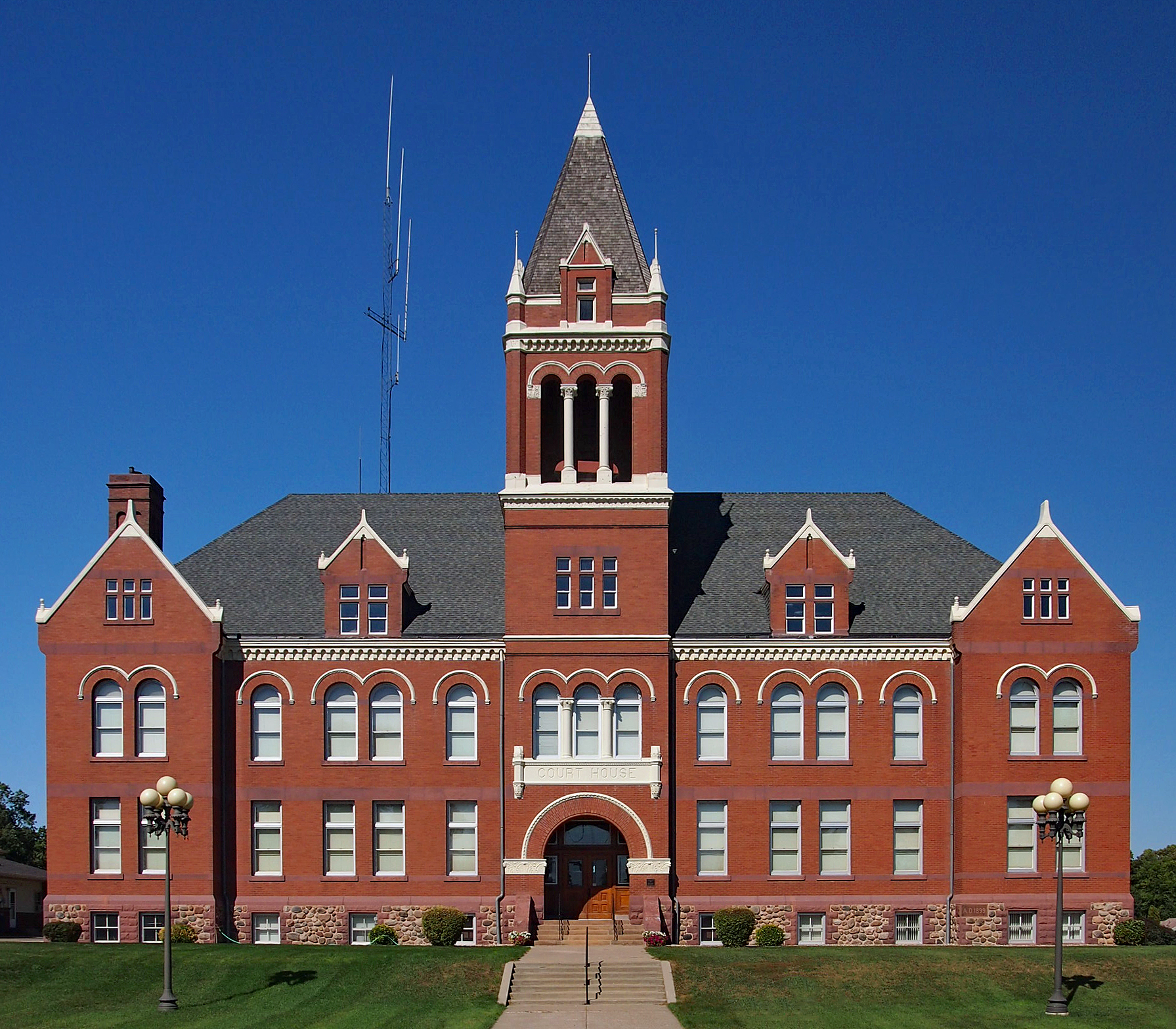
Lac qui Parle County Courthouse

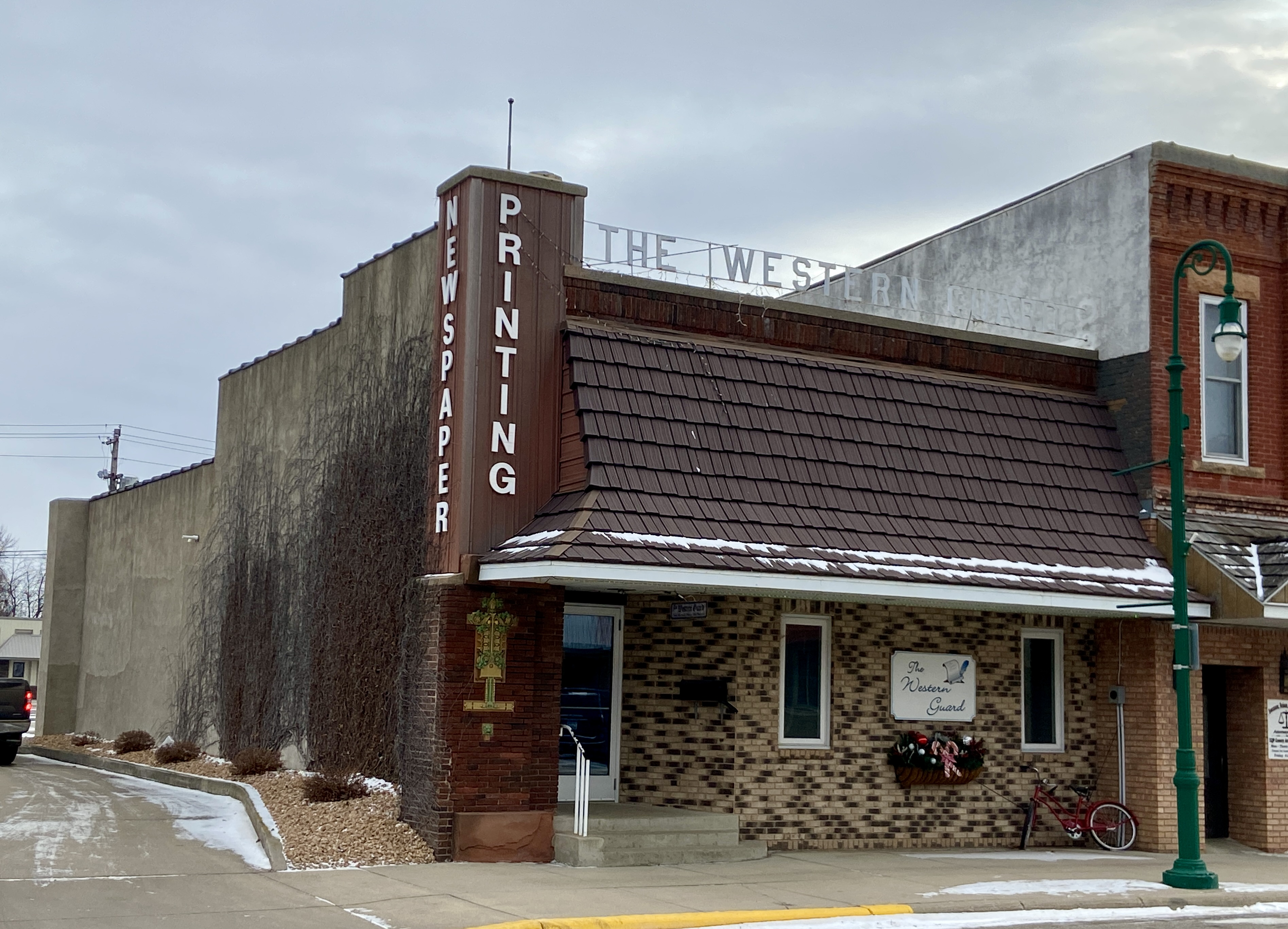
The Western Guard Newspaper
