= Ten Mile Lake Township, Lac qui Parle County, Minnesota =

Ten Mile Lake Township, Minnesota
- Township
- Location within the state of Minnesota Ten Mile Lake Township, Minnesota (the United States)
- Coordinates: 44°51′25″N 95°54′19″W
- Country: United States
- State: Minnesota
- County: Lac qui Parle

Area
  - Total: 35.5 sq mi (92.0 km^{2})
  - Land: 35.3 sq mi (91.3 km^{2})
  - Water: 0.27 sq mi (0.7 km^{2})
- Elevation: 1,050 ft (320 m)

Population (2000)
  - Total: 195
  - Density: 5.4/sq mi (2.1/km^{2})
- Time zone: UTC-6 (Central (CST))
  - Summer (DST): UTC-5 (CDT)
- FIPS code: 27-64408
- GNIS feature ID: 0665774

Ten Mile Lake Township is a township in Lac qui Parle County, Minnesota, United States. The population was 195 at the 2000 census.

Ten Mile Lake Township was organized in 1878, and named for a former lake which was named for its distance, ten miles (16 km) from a trading post.

== Geography ==
According to the United States Census Bureau, the township has a total area of 35.5 square miles (92.0 km^{2}), of which 35.2 square miles (91.3 km^{2}) is land and 0.3 square mile (0.7 km^{2}) (0.73%) is water.

== Demographics ==
As of the census of 2000, there were 195 people, 67 households, and 58 families residing in the township. The population density was 5.5 people per square mile (2.1/km^{2}). There were 73 housing units at an average density of 2.1/sq mi (0.8/km^{2}). The racial makeup of the township was 98.97% White and 1.03% Asian.

There were 67 households, out of which 37.3% had children under the age of 18 living with them, 77.6% were married couples living together, 6.0% had a female householder with no husband present, and 13.4% were non-families. 13.4% of all households were made up of individuals, and 6.0% had someone living alone who was 65 years of age or older. The average household size was 2.91 and the average family size was 3.21.

In the township the population was spread out, with 30.8% under the age of 18, 6.2% from 18 to 24, 22.1% from 25 to 44, 24.6% from 45 to 64, and 16.4% who were 65 years of age or older. The median age was 39 years. For every 100 females, there were 93.1 males. For every 100 females age 18 and over, there were 95.7 males.

The median income for a household in the township was $46,250, and the median income for a family was $46,250. Males had a median income of $29,167 versus $37,500 for females. The per capita income for the township was $22,717. About 1.9% of families and 5.1% of the population were below the poverty line, including 9.6% of those under the age of eighteen and none of those 65 or over.
