= Lac qui Parle River =

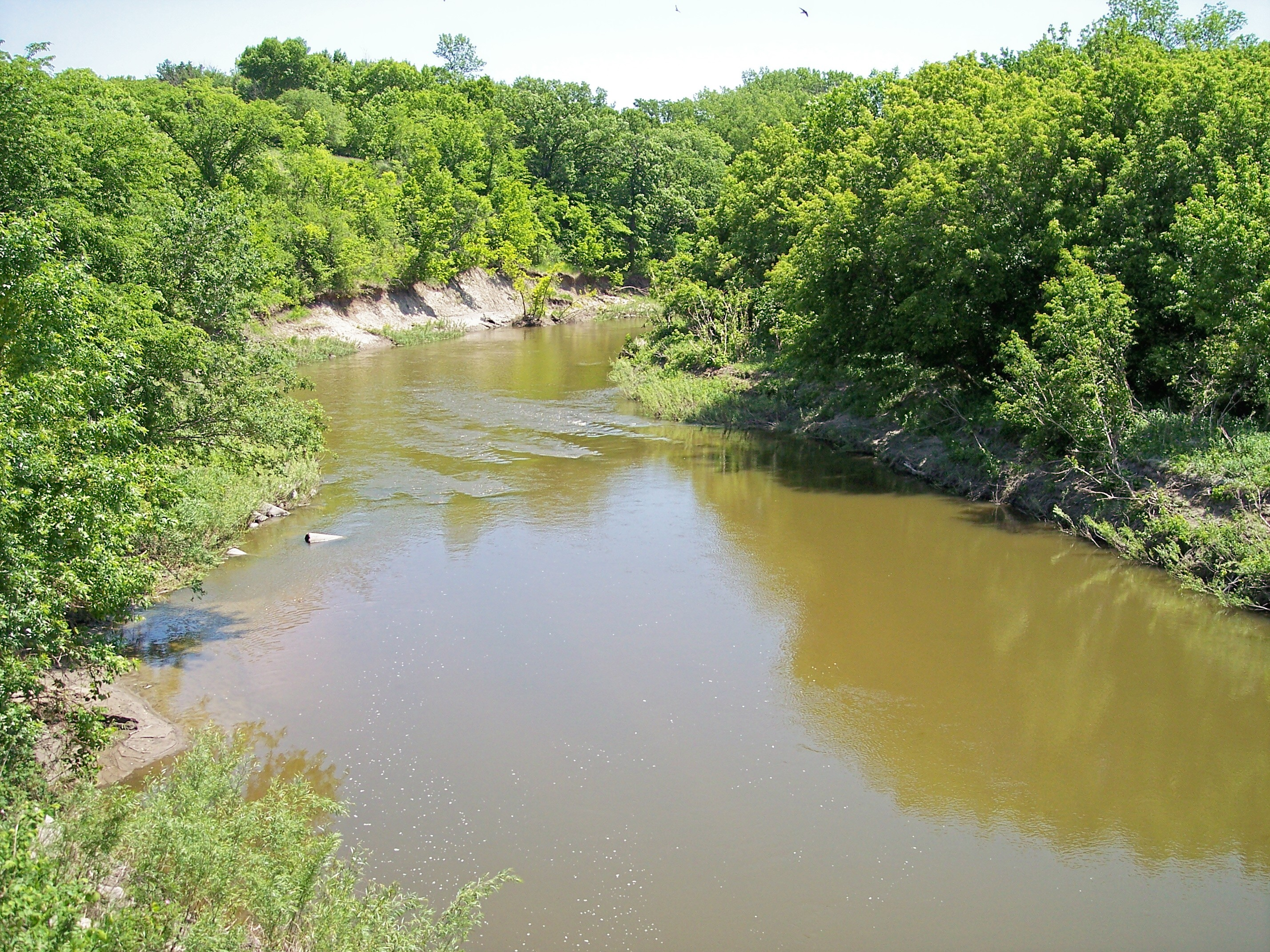
- The Lac qui Parle River in Lac qui Parle Township in 2007

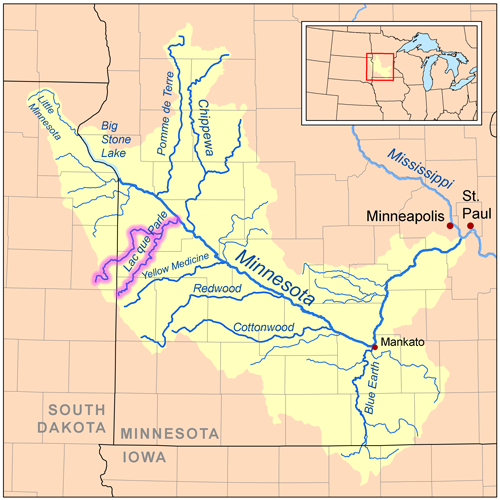
- Native name: Íƞkpa Wakpadaƞ (Dakota)

Location
- Country: United States
- State: Minnesota

Physical characteristics
- Source: Lake Hendricks
  - location: Hendricks, Lincoln County
  - coordinates: 44°30′17″N 96°26′06″W
  - elevation: 1,755 ft (535 m)
- Mouth: Minnesota River
  - location: Lac qui Parle State Park, Lac qui Parle County
  - coordinates: 45°01′35″N 95°52′49″W
  - elevation: 934 ft (285 m)
- Length: 118.3 mi (190.4 km)
- Basin size: 1,156 sq mi (2,990 km^{2})
- Discharge
  - location: Lac qui Parle Township
  - average: 157 cu ft/s (4.4 m^{3}/s)
  - minimum: 0 cu ft/s (0 m^{3}/s)
  - maximum: 17,100 cu ft/s (480 m^{3}/s)

Basin features
- Tributaries
  - left: West Branch Lac qui Parle River

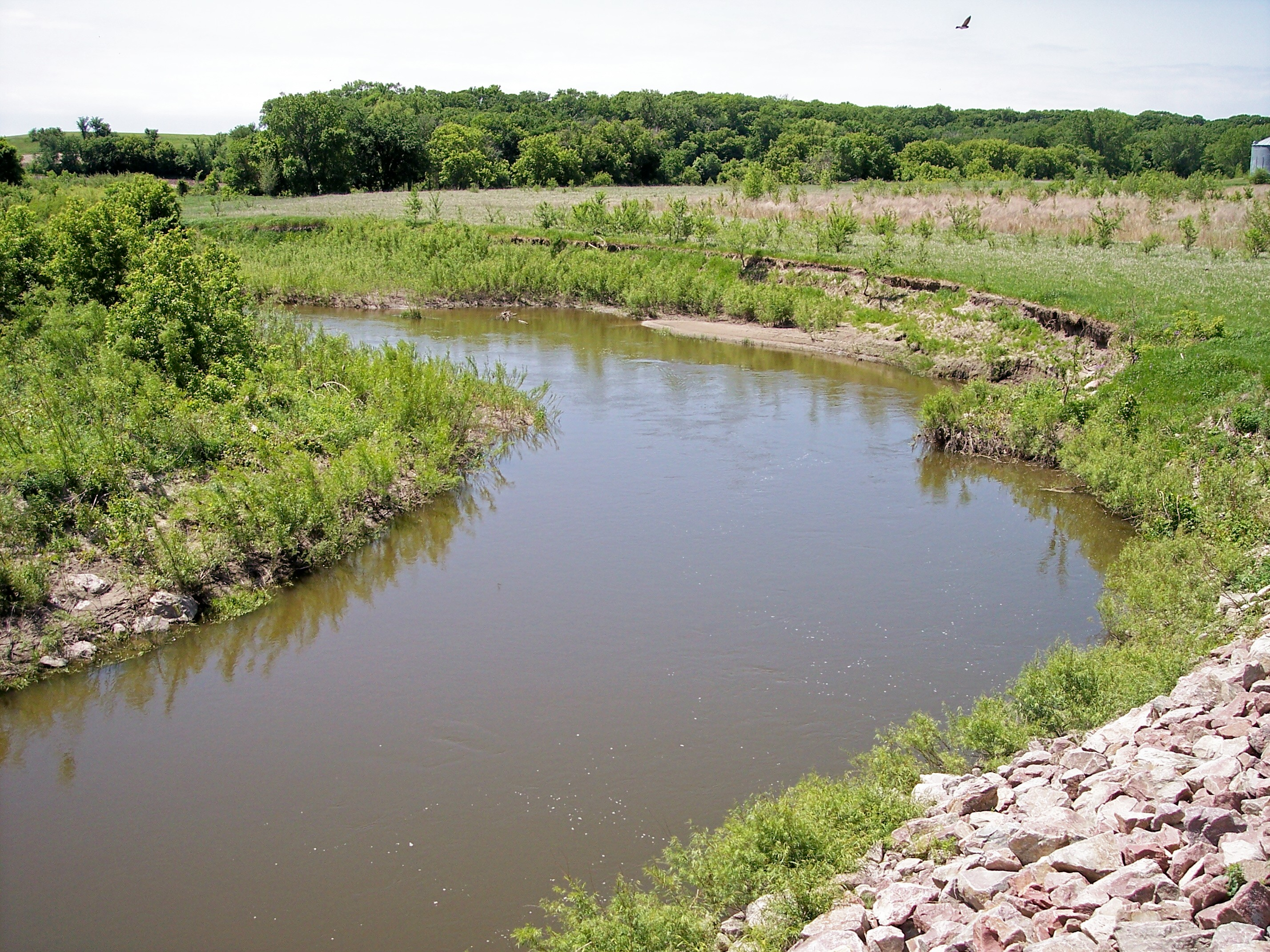
The Lac qui Parle River in Lac qui Parle Township in 2007

The Lac qui Parle River is a tributary of the Minnesota River, 118 miles (190 km) long, in southwestern Minnesota in the United States. A number of tributaries of the river, including its largest, the West Branch Lac qui Parle River, also flow in eastern South Dakota. Via the Minnesota River, the Lac qui Parle River is part of the watershed of the Mississippi River, draining an area of 1,156 square miles (2,990 km^{2}) in an agricultural region. Slightly more than two-thirds of the Lac qui Parle watershed is in Minnesota.

The Native Dakota name for the river is Íƞkpa Wakpadaƞ which means "River of the End", referencing that the Dakota considered this river to be the head of the Minnesota River. The French misinterpreted the name for Lac qui Parle Lake as also belonging to the Lac qui Parle River. The river was also called Beaver Creek by fur traders.

The source of the river is Lake Hendricks on the boundary of Lincoln County, Minnesota, and Brookings County, South Dakota. It issues from the lake in Hendricks, Minnesota, and flows northeastwardly through northwestern Lincoln County as an intermittent stream on the Coteau des Prairies, a morainic plateau dividing the Mississippi and Missouri River watersheds, into western Yellow Medicine County, where it flows off the Coteau, dropping 250 feet (76 m) in eight miles (13 km). Continuing northeastwardly through flat till plains with occasional willows and cottonwoods along its banks, the river flows into eastern Lac qui Parle County, passing to the east of Dawson. It flows into the Minnesota River just below Lac qui Parle Lake in Lac qui Parle State Park, approximately ten miles (16 km) northwest of Montevideo, after flowing through a wooded valley in which it drops 210 feet (64 m) in 18 miles (29 km). Lac qui Parle Lake was formed by a delta at the mouth of the Lac qui Parle River, and is maintained by a dam.

The river's largest tributary, the West Branch Lac qui Parle River, 64.1 miles (103.2 km) long, rises on the coteau in eastern Deuel County, South Dakota, and flows initially northeastwardly as an intermittent stream, past Gary, South Dakota, then eastwardly through Lac qui Parle County, past Dawson. Other tributaries include two small trout streams: Canby Creek, 24 miles (39 km) long, which flows northeastwardly on the Coteau in western Yellow Medicine County, through Canby; and Tenmile Creek, 33 miles (53 km) long, which flows eastward and northward through Lac qui Parle County, through Boyd.

According to the Minnesota Pollution Control Agency, of the 806 square miles (2,090 km^{2}) of the river's watershed in Minnesota, 79% of the land is used for agricultural cultivation, primarily corn and soybeans. Water quality has degraded, with only 3% of the river being fully supportive of aquatic life. Eutrophication is one major reason for this.

The river is also home to calcerous fen habitats, seven of which exist in the Lac qui Parle River Watershed. Calcerous fens are calcium-rich peat wetlands which support endangered plants in Minnesota like the cut-leaf water parsnip and hairy fimbry.

The Lac qui Parle River is used recreationally as a place for canoeing and kayaking.

== Flow rate ==
At the United States Geological Survey's stream gauge near the community of Lac qui Parle in Lac qui Parle Township, the annual mean flow of the river between 1910 and 2005 was 157 cubic feet per second (4 m^{3}/s). The highest recorded flow during the period was 17,100 ft^{3}/s (484 m^{3}/s) on April 10, 1969. Readings of zero were recorded on numerous days during several years.

== In media ==
- "Driving Toward the Lac qui Parle River" is a poem by Robert Bly, in which the river is a part of the setting.

== See also ==
- List of rivers of Minnesota
- List of rivers of South Dakota
- List of Minnesota placenames of Native American origin
