= Arena Township, Lac qui Parle County, Minnesota =

Arena Township, Minnesota
- Township
- Location within the state of Minnesota Arena Township, Minnesota (the United States)
- Coordinates: 45°1′28″N 96°16′54″W
- Country: United States
- State: Minnesota
- County: Lac qui Parle

Area
  - Total: 37.1 sq mi (96.1 km^{2})
  - Land: 36.7 sq mi (95.0 km^{2})
  - Water: 0.39 sq mi (1.0 km^{2})
- Elevation: 1,079 ft (329 m)

Population (2000)
  - Total: 153
  - Density: 4.1/sq mi (1.6/km^{2})
- Time zone: UTC-6 (Central (CST))
  - Summer (DST): UTC-5 (CDT)
- FIPS code: 27-02062
- GNIS feature ID: 0663453

Arena Township (pronounced like the word) is a township in Lac qui Parle County, Minnesota, United States. The population was 153 at the 2000 census.

Arena Township was named after both the Town of Arena and Arena, Wisconsin, which it contains. The township's early pioneers came from this location.

== History ==
Arena Township was organized in 1880.

== Geography ==
According to the United States Census Bureau, the township has a total area of 37.1 square miles (96 km^{2}), of which 36.7 square miles (95 km^{2}) is land and 0.4 square miles (1.0 km^{2}) (1.05%) is water.

== Demographics ==
As of the census of 2000, there were 153 people, 56 households, and 42 families residing in the township. The population density was 4.2 inhabitants per square mile (1.6/km^{2}). There were 60 housing units at an average density of 1.6 per square mile (0.62/km^{2}). The racial makeup of the township was 99.35% White and 0.65% African American.

There were 56 households, out of which 42.9% had children under the age of 18 living with them, 67.9% were married couples living together; 1.8% had a female householder with no husband present, and 25.0% were non-families. 17.9% of all households were made up of individuals, and 10.7% had someone living alone who was 65 years of age or older. The average household size was 2.73 and the average family size was 3.19.

In the township the population was spread out, with 30.7% under the age of 18, 7.8% from 18 to 24, 23.5% from 25 to 44, 27.5% from 45 to 64, and 10.5% who were 65 years of age or older. The median age was 37 years. For every 100 females, there were 131.8 males. For every 100 females age 18 and over, there were 116.3 males.

The median income for a household in the township was $42,813, and the median income for a family was $46,250. Males had a median income of $23,750 versus $20,000 for females. The per capita income for the township was $15,697. About 7.1% of families and 8.6% of the population were below the poverty line, including none of those under the age of eighteen or sixty five or over.
