= Cerro Gordo Township, Lac qui Parle County, Minnesota =

Cerro Gordo Township, Minnesota
- Township
- Location within the state of Minnesota Cerro Gordo Township, Minnesota (the United States)
- Coordinates: 45°1′17″N 96°2′5″W
- Country: United States
- State: Minnesota
- County: Lac qui Parle

Area
  - Total: 35.9 sq mi (92.9 km^{2})
  - Land: 35.8 sq mi (92.7 km^{2})
  - Water: 0.077 sq mi (0.2 km^{2})
- Elevation: 1,020 ft (311 m)

Population (2000)
  - Total: 256
  - Density: 7.3/sq mi (2.8/km^{2})
- Time zone: UTC-6 (Central (CST))
  - Summer (DST): UTC-5 (CDT)
- FIPS code: 27-10774
- GNIS feature ID: 0663776

Cerro Gordo Township is a township in Lac qui Parle County, Minnesota, United States. The population was 256 at the 2000 census.

Cerro Gordo Township was organized in 1871, and named in commemoration of the Battle of Cerro Gordo.

== Geography ==
According to the United States Census Bureau, the township has a total area of 35.9 square miles (93 km^{2}), of which 35.8 square miles (93 km^{2}) is land and 0.1 square miles (0.26 km^{2}) (0.25%) is water.

== Demographics ==
As of the census of 2000, there were 256 people, 87 households, and 70 families residing in the township. The population density was 7.2 inhabitants per square mile (2.8/km^{2}). There were 92 housing units at an average density of 2.6 per square mile (1.0/km^{2}). The racial makeup of the township was 96.09% White, 0.78% African American, 0.78% Native American, 1.17% from other races, and 1.17% from two or more races. Hispanic or Latino of any race were 1.95% of the population.

There were 87 households, out of which 43.7% had children under the age of 18 living with them, 66.7% were married couples living together, 11.5% had a female householder with no husband present, and 19.5% were non-families. 16.1% of all households were made up of individuals, and 9.2% had someone living alone who was 65 years of age or older. The average household size was 2.94 and the average family size was 3.24.

In the township the population was spread out, with 30.1% under the age of 18, 9.0% from 18 to 24, 27.7% from 25 to 44, 23.8% from 45 to 64, and 9.4% who were 65 years of age or older. The median age was 37 years. For every 100 females, there were 104.8 males. For every 100 females age 18 and over, there were 98.9 males.

The median income for a household in the township was $52,500, and the median income for a family was $56,875. Males had a median income of $26,750 versus $25,250 for females. The per capita income for the township was $16,486. About 2.7% of families and 1.6% of the population were below the poverty line, including none of those under the age of eighteen or sixty five or over.
