= Boyd, Minnesota =

City in Minnesota, United States

Boyd
- City
- Location of Boyd, Minnesota
- Coordinates: 44°51′04″N 95°54′03″W
- Country: United States
- State: Minnesota
- County: Lac qui Parle

Area
  - Total: 0.51 sq mi (1.32 km^{2})
  - Land: 0.51 sq mi (1.32 km^{2})
  - Water: 0 sq mi (0.00 km^{2})
- Elevation: 1,050 ft (320 m)

Population (2020)
  - Total: 141
  - Density: 275.9/sq mi (106.53/km^{2})
- Time zone: UTC-6 (Central (CST))
  - Summer (DST): UTC-5 (CDT)
- ZIP code: 56218
- Area code: 320
- FIPS code: 27-07138
- GNIS feature ID: 2394232
- Website: www.cityofboydminnesota.com

Boyd is a city in Lac qui Parle County, Minnesota, United States. The population was 141 at the 2020 census.

== History ==
Boyd was platted in 1884. A post office has been in operation at Boyd since 1884. The city was incorporated in 1893.

== Geography ==
According to the United States Census Bureau, the city has a total area of 0.52 square miles (1.35 km^{2}), all land.

== Demographics ==
Historical population
Census	Pop.	Note	%±
1900	335		—
1910	431		28.7%
1920	549		27.4%
1930	449		−18.2%
1940	523		16.5%
1950	496		−5.2%
1960	419		−15.5%
1970	311		−25.8%
1980	329		5.8%
1990	251		−23.7%
2000	210		−16.3%
2010	175		−16.7%
2020	141		−19.4%
U.S. Decennial Census

=== 2010 census ===
As of the census of 2010, there were 175 people, 88 households, and 43 families living in the city. The population density was 336.5 inhabitants per square mile (129.9/km^{2}). There were 114 housing units at an average density of 219.2 per square mile (84.6/km^{2}). The racial makeup of the city was 94.9% White, 0.6% Asian, and 4.6% from other races. Hispanic or Latino of any race were 4.6% of the population.

There were 88 households, of which 17.0% had children under the age of 18 living with them, 37.5% were married couples living together, 4.5% had a female householder with no husband present, 6.8% had a male householder with no wife present, and 51.1% were non-families. 43.2% of all households were made up of individuals, and 17% had someone living alone who was 65 years of age or older. The average household size was 1.99 and the average family size was 2.63.

The median age in the city was 49.2 years. 17.7% of residents were under the age of 18; 7.4% were between the ages of 18 and 24; 19.4% were from 25 to 44; 34.9% were from 45 to 64; and 20.6% were 65 years of age or older. The gender makeup of the city was 56.0% male and 44.0% female.

=== 2000 census ===
As of the census of 2000, there were 210 people, 100 households, and 52 families living in the city. The population density was 393.5 inhabitants per square mile (151.9/km^{2}). There were 116 housing units at an average density of 217.4 per square mile (83.9/km^{2}). The racial makeup of the city was 97.62% White, 1.43% Native American and 0.95% Asian.

There were 100 households, out of which 18.0% had children under the age of 18 living with them, 42.0% were married couples living together, 7.0% had a female householder with no husband present, and 48.0% were non-families. 39.0% of all households were made up of individuals, and 16.0% had someone living alone who was 65 years of age or older. The average household size was 2.10 and the average family size was 2.88.

In the city, the population was spread out, with 19.0% under the age of 18, 8.1% from 18 to 24, 30.5% from 25 to 44, 27.1% from 45 to 64, and 15.2% who were 65 years of age or older. The median age was 42 years. For every 100 females, there were 103.9 males. For every 100 females age 18 and over, there were 107.3 males.

The median income for a household in the city was $30,625, and the median income for a family was $41,500. Males had a median income of $21,591 versus $17,955 for females. The per capita income for the city was $16,917. About 4.0% of families and 6.8% of the population were below the poverty line, including none of those under the age of eighteen and 5.4% of those 65 or over.
