= Lac qui Parle County, Minnesota =

County in Minnesota, United States

- County
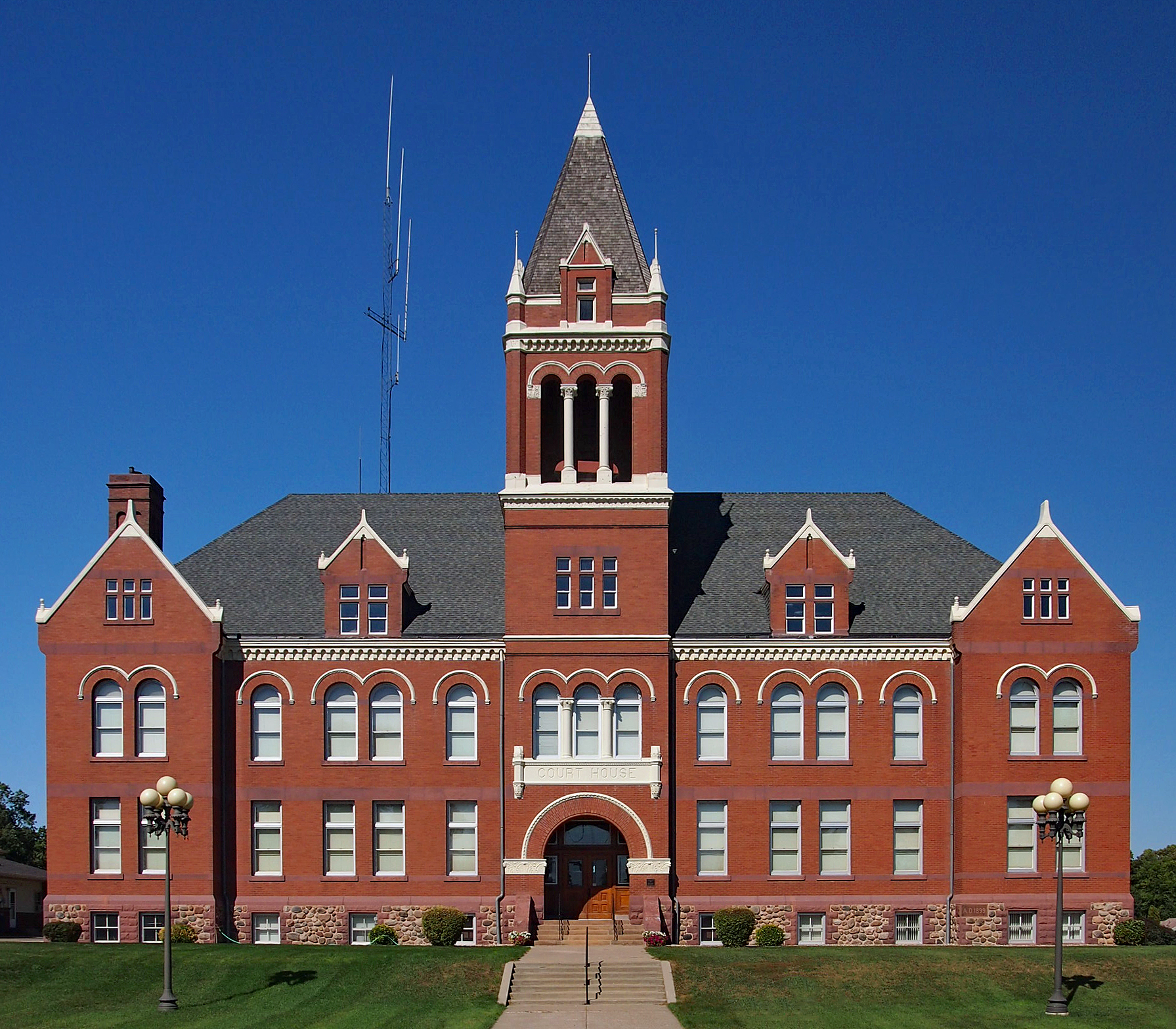
- Lac qui Parle County Courthouse

- Location within the U.S. state of Minnesota
- Coordinates: 45°00′N 96°11′W
- Country: United States
- State: Minnesota
- Founded: March 6, 1871
- Named for: "Lake that speaks" French
- Seat: Madison
- Largest city: Dawson

Area
  - Total: 778 sq mi (2,020 km^{2})
  - Land: 765 sq mi (1,980 km^{2})
  - Water: 13 sq mi (34 km^{2}) 1.7%

Population (2020)
  - Total: 6,719
  - Estimate (2025): 6,704 ▼
  - Density: 8.8/sq mi (3.4/km^{2})
- Time zone: UTC−6 (Central)
  - Summer (DST): UTC−5 (CDT)
- Congressional district: 7th
- Website: www.lqpcomn.gov

Lac qui Parle County (/ˌlæk ki ˈpɑːrl/ LAK kee PARL) is a county in the southwestern part of the U.S. state of Minnesota. As of the 2020 census, the population was 6,719. Its county seat is Madison. The largest city in the county is Dawson.

== History ==
The name of the county is a French translation of the Dakota name, "Mde Iyedan," meaning "lake that speaks."

In 1862 the Minnesota legislature authorized creation of a county to be called Lac qui Parle on an area north of the Minnesota River. However, that initiative was not approved by the local voters affected, so the proposed county did not come into existence. Nine years later (March 6, 1871) the legislature authorized creation of the present Lac qui Parle County, south of the Minnesota River, and it was approved by local voters. The county seat was established at Lac qui Parle village.

In 1884 a settlement was platted at the railway stop in Madison Township (named for Madison, Wisconsin). The settlement, also named Madison, was incorporated in 1885, and in 1889 the county government was moved from Lac qui Parle village to this new town, which incorporated as a city in 1902.

In 1886, a county-wide election chose Madison as the county seat. 150 men and 40 teams of horses rode to Lac qui Parle village, where the town hall was at the time, and dragged the building to Madison.

A new county courthouse was built in Madison in 1899, and in 1903 the Madison City Hall was completed. A total of four fires swept the city's main area during the early years of the twentieth century, resulting in most wood structures in the area being replaced with brick buildings.

Until May 1965, when county option was eliminated, Lac qui Parle was a dry county; no beverages with over 3.2% alcohol could be sold.

A March 2011 study by the University of Wisconsin–Madison and the Robert Wood Johnson Foundation ranked this as Minnesota's healthiest county.

The county reached its peak population of 15,554 in 1920. However, the county seat continued its population growth until 1960, when 2,380 residents were counted.

== Geography ==
Lac qui Parle County is on the west side of Minnesota. Its west border abuts the east border of the state of South Dakota. The Minnesota River flows southeastward along the county's NE border, creating Marsh Lake and Lac qui Parle Reservoir The Minnesota River flow is augmented by Yellow Bank River near the county's north corner, and by Lac qui Parle River near the county's east border. The south fork of the Yellow Bank flows northward through the west portion of the county, and meets the north fork of the Yellow Bank in the north end of the county; the combined flow discharges into the Minnesota at the county's NE border. The Lac qui Parle flows eastward through the lower portion of the county, discharging into the Minnesota near the community of Lac qui Parle.

The county terrain consists of rolling hills, knolls and short bluffs near the west end, running to a steep bluff overlooking the Minnesota River valley on its east border. The area is largely devoted to agriculture. The terrain slopes to the north and east, with its highest point near its SW corner, at 1,404 ft (428 m) ASL. The county has a total area of 778 square miles (2,020 km^{2}), of which 765 square miles (1,980 km^{2}) is land and 13 square miles (34 km^{2}) (1.7%) is water.

The county's northern boundary is defined by the Minnesota River. Two tributaries, the Lac qui Parle River and the Yellow Bank River, flow through the county to discharge into the Minnesota.

Salt Lake is found the county's western border. The lake is the only alkaline lake in Minnesota. Salt Lake is a popular bird watching location because it is home to 145 species of birds that are not found other places in the area. Rare plants and insects have also been known to inhabit the region.

Soils of Lac qui Parle County

=== Lakes ===
- Bolland Slough
- Case Lake
- Flinks Slough (part)
- Kibler Lake
- Lac qui Parle (adjacent to county)
- Marsh Lake (adjacent to county)
- Mud Lake
- Pegg Lake
- Salt Lake (part)
- Swanson Lake

=== Major highways ===
- U.S. Highway 59
- U.S. Highway 75
- U.S. Highway 212
- Minnesota State Highway 40
- Minnesota State Highway 119

=== Adjacent counties ===
- Big Stone County - north
- Swift County - northeast
- Chippewa County - east
- Yellow Medicine County - south
- Deuel County, South Dakota - southwest
- Grant County, South Dakota - northwest

=== Protected areas ===
- Acton Marsh State Wildlife Management Area
- Big Stone National Wildlife Refuge (part)
- Borchardt-Rosin State Wildlife Management Area
- Church State Wildlife Management Area
- De Vorak State Wildlife Management Area
- Flinks State Wildlife Management Area
- Haydenville State Wildlife Management Area
- Kemen State Wildlife Management Area
- Kibler Scientific and Natural Area
- Lac qui Parle State Park
- Medicine Pipe State Wildlife Management Area
- Plantation State Wildlife Management Area
- Providence State Wildlife Management Area
- Sweetwater State Wildlife Management Area
- Wild Wings Baxter State Wildlife Management Area
- Yellow Bank Hills Scientific and Natural Area

== Demographics ==
Historical population
Census	Pop.	Note	%±
1870	145		—
1880	4,891		3,273.1%
1890	10,382		112.3%
1900	14,289		37.6%
1910	15,435		8.0%
1920	15,554		0.8%
1930	15,398		−1.0%
1940	15,509		0.7%
1950	14,545		−6.2%
1960	13,330		−8.4%
1970	11,164		−16.2%
1980	10,592		−5.1%
1990	8,924		−15.7%
2000	8,067		−9.6%
2010	7,259		−10.0%
2020	6,719		−7.4%
2025 (est.)	6,704	▼	−0.2%
U.S. Decennial Census; 1790-1960 1900-1990; 1990-2000 2010-2020

=== Racial and ethnic composition ===
Lac qui Parle County, Minnesota – Racial and ethnic composition Note: the US Census treats Hispanic/Latino as an ethnic category. This table excludes Latinos from the racial categories and assigns them to a separate category. Hispanics/Latinos may be of any race.
Race / Ethnicity (NH = Non-Hispanic)	Pop 1980	Pop 1990	Pop 2000	Pop 2010	Pop 2020	% 1980	% 1990	% 2000	% 2010	% 2020
White alone (NH)	10,519	8,851	7,965	7,040	6,244	99.31%	99.18%	98.74%	96.98%	92.93%
Black or African American alone (NH)	4	9	13	17	32	0.04%	0.10%	0.16%	0.23%	0.48%
Native American or Alaska Native alone (NH)	17	12	15	10	10	0.16%	0.13%	0.19%	0.14%	0.15%
Asian alone (NH)	30	28	26	29	40	0.28%	0.31%	0.32%	0.40%	0.60%
Native Hawaiian or Pacific Islander alone (NH)	x	x	0	2	0	x	x	0.00%	0.03%	0.00%
Other race alone (NH)	0	1	1	1	16	0.00%	0.01%	0.01%	0.01%	0.24%
Mixed race or Multiracial (NH)	x	x	26	52	175	x	x	0.32%	0.72%	2.60%
Hispanic or Latino (any race)	22	23	21	108	202	0.21%	0.26%	0.26%	1.49%	3.01%
Total	10,592	8,924	8,067	7,259	6,719	100.00%	100.00%	100.00%	100.00%	100.00%

=== 2020 Census ===
As of the 2020 United States census, the county had a population of 6,719. The median age was 48.0 years. 21.5% of residents were under the age of 18 and 26.0% of residents were 65 years of age or older. For every 100 females there were 104.7 males, and for every 100 females age 18 and over there were 100.4 males age 18 and over.

The racial makeup of the county was 93.6% White, 0.5% Black or African American, 0.2% American Indian and Alaska Native, 0.6% Asian, <0.1% Native Hawaiian and Pacific Islander, 1.7% from some other race, and 3.3% from two or more races. Hispanic or Latino residents of any race comprised 3.0% of the population.

<0.1% of residents lived in urban areas, while 100.0% lived in rural areas.

There were 2,954 households in the county, of which 24.7% had children under the age of 18 living in them. Of all households, 51.9% were married-couple households, 21.3% were households with a male householder and no spouse or partner present, and 20.7% were households with a female householder and no spouse or partner present. About 32.9% of all households were made up of individuals and 16.9% had someone living alone who was 65 years of age or older.

There were 3,471 housing units, of which 14.9% were vacant. Among occupied housing units, 80.9% were owner-occupied and 19.1% were renter-occupied. The homeowner vacancy rate was 1.7% and the rental vacancy rate was 12.7%.

=== 2000 census ===
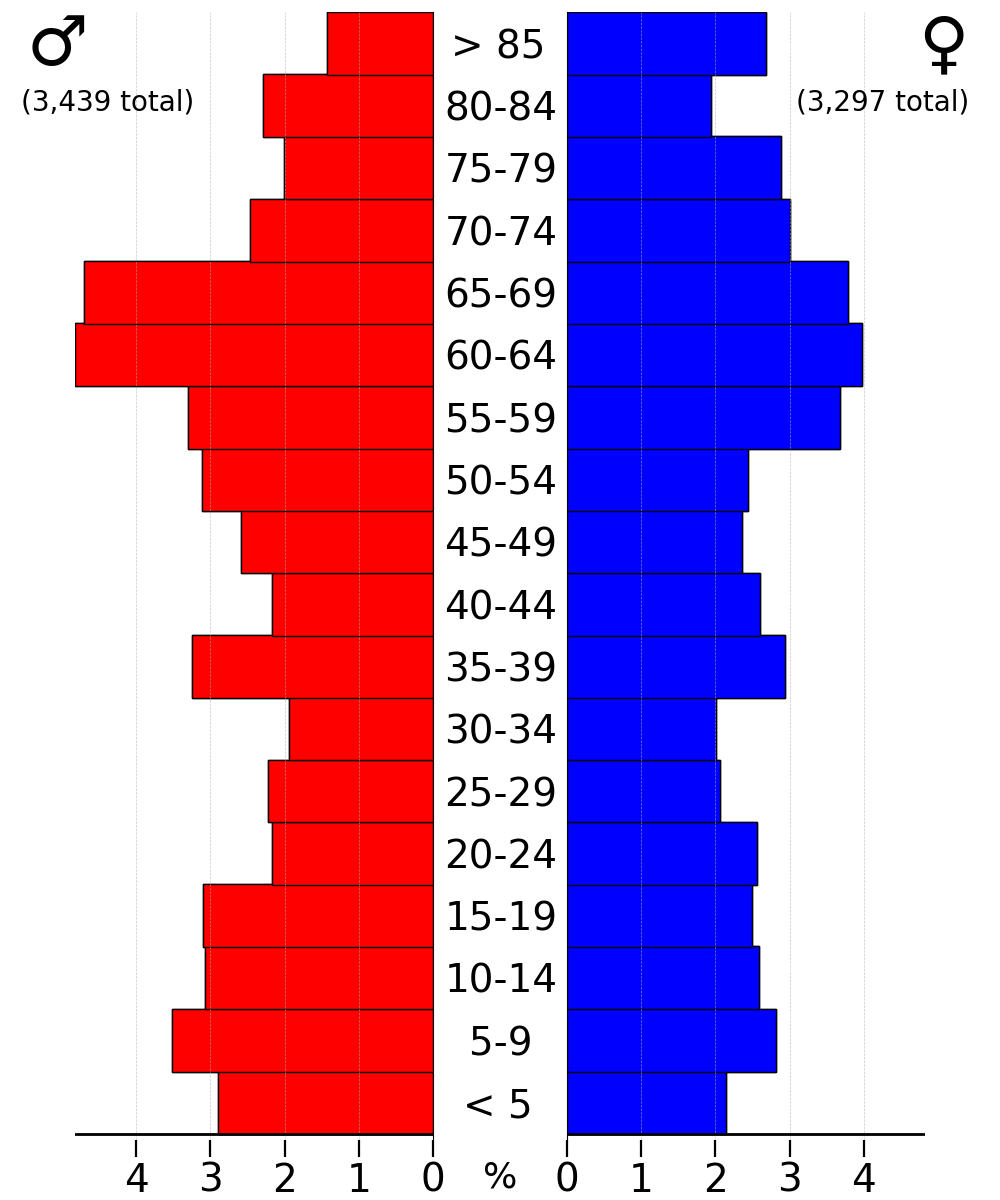
2022 US Census population pyramid for Lac qui Parle County, from ACS 5-year estimates

As of the census of 2000, there were 8,067 people, 3,316 households, and 2,225 families in the county. The population density was 10.5 per square mile (4.1/km^{2}). There were 3,774 housing units at an average density of 4.93 per square mile (1.90/km^{2}). The racial makeup of the county was 98.85% White, 0.16% Black or African American, 0.22% Native American, 0.32% Asian, 0.06% from other races, and 0.38% from two or more races. 0.26% of the population were Hispanic or Latino of any race. 44.6% were of Norwegian and 35.2% German ancestry.

There were 3,316 households, out of which 27.90% had children under the age of 18 living with them, 59.80% were married couples living together, 4.10% had a female householder with no husband present, and 32.90% were non-families. 30.20% of all households were made up of individuals, and 17.90% had someone living alone who was 65 years of age or older. The average household size was 2.37 and the average family size was 2.96.

The county population contained 24.50% under the age of 18, 5.70% from 18 to 24, 22.70% from 25 to 44, 23.90% from 45 to 64, and 23.20% who were 65 years of age or older. The median age was 43 years. For every 100 females there were 98.60 males. For every 100 females age 18 and over, there were 95.60 males.

The median income for a household in the county was $32,626, and the median income for a family was $41,556. Males had a median income of $27,939 versus $19,681 for females. The per capita income for the county was $17,399. About 5.60% of families and 8.50% of the population were below the poverty line, including 7.80% of those under age 18 and 9.20% of those age 65 or over.

== Communities ==
=== Cities ===
- Bellingham
- Boyd
- Dawson
- Louisburg
- Madison (county seat)
- Marietta
- Nassau

=== Unincorporated communities ===
- Cerro Gordo
- Haydenville
- Lac qui Parle
- Providence
- Rosen

=== Townships ===
- Agassiz Township
- Arena Township
- Augusta Township
- Baxter Township
- Camp Release Township
- Cerro Gordo Township
- Freeland Township
- Garfield Township
- Hamlin Township
- Hantho Township
- Lac qui Parle Township
- Lake Shore Township
- Madison Township
- Manfred Township
- Maxwell Township
- Mehurin Township
- Perry Township
- Providence Township
- Riverside Township
- Ten Mile Lake Township
- Walter Township
- Yellow Bank Township

=== Extinct town ===
- Williamsburg

== Law and government ==
=== Commissioners ===
District	Commissioner	In office since	Current term expires on January 1
1st	Todd Patzer	2005	2029
2nd	DeRon Brehmer	2011	2027
3rd	Greg Thole	2025	2029
4th	Ben Bothun	2019	2027
5th	Stacy Tufto	2021	2029

=== Key staff ===
Lac qui Parle County's normal operations are coordinated by the County Administrator Jake Sieg along with County Department Heads.

=== Law enforcement ===
The current Sheriff of Lac qui Parle County is Allen Anderson, who became sheriff in 2017 upon the resignation of former Sheriff Lou Sager. Anderson won the 2018 election. The City of Dawson Chief of Police is Andrew Stock.

== Politics ==
From the county's founding until 1956, Lac qui Parle County voted Republican, typically by large margins, in all but four elections, in 1912 when former Republican Theodore Roosevelt won as the Progressive candidate, in the two landslide victories for Democrat Franklin D. Roosevelt in 1932 and 1936, and for Democrat Harry S. Truman in the close 1948 election. From 1960 to 2012, however, Lac qui Parle County voted Democratic in every election except for the two landslide wins for Ronald Reagan in 1980 and 1984. Beginning in 2016, the county has transitioned to being Republican once again, as Donald Trump won by over 25%, the best margin for any party since 1964 in the county. He increased his margin of victory to nearly 27% in 2020, and obtained over 62% of the vote, becoming the first candidate of any party to receive at least 60% of the vote since Jimmy Carter in 1976 (with native Minnesotan Walter Mondale as his running mate), and the first Republican to win at least 60% of the county's vote since Warren G. Harding a century earlier. Trump further increased his margin of victory to 32% in 2024, the best performance for a Republican presidential candidate in the county since Harding in 1920.

United States presidential election results for Lac qui Parle County, Minnesota
Year	Republican		Democratic		Third party(ies)	
Year	No.	%	No.	%	No.	%
1872	236	97.12%	7	2.88%	0	0.00%
1876	351	94.35%	20	5.38%	1	0.27%
1880	878	94.92%	47	5.08%	0	0.00%
1884	966	81.45%	220	18.55%	0	0.00%
1888	1,298	67.39%	540	28.04%	88	4.57%
1892	1,164	52.31%	457	20.54%	604	27.15%
1896	1,620	61.34%	932	35.29%	89	3.37%
1900	1,924	71.47%	642	23.85%	126	4.68%
1904	1,886	83.27%	243	10.73%	136	6.00%
1908	1,894	69.17%	661	24.14%	183	6.68%
1912	343	13.51%	608	23.96%	1,587	62.53%
1916	1,614	56.30%	1,047	36.52%	206	7.19%
1920	4,219	82.29%	653	12.74%	255	4.97%
1924	2,860	52.26%	106	1.94%	2,507	45.81%
1928	3,406	59.65%	2,245	39.32%	59	1.03%
1932	1,911	31.85%	3,992	66.53%	97	1.62%
1936	2,066	34.46%	3,243	54.09%	687	11.46%
1940	3,789	54.73%	3,106	44.86%	28	0.40%
1944	3,104	52.61%	2,779	47.10%	17	0.29%
1948	2,330	38.20%	3,690	60.49%	80	1.31%
1952	3,924	58.52%	2,753	41.06%	28	0.42%
1956	3,276	53.63%	2,826	46.27%	6	0.10%
1960	3,185	49.39%	3,253	50.44%	11	0.17%
1964	2,236	36.18%	3,934	63.66%	10	0.16%
1968	2,672	45.85%	2,937	50.39%	219	3.76%
1972	2,773	48.43%	2,845	49.69%	108	1.89%
1976	2,292	37.79%	3,647	60.13%	126	2.08%
1980	2,981	50.50%	2,457	41.62%	465	7.88%
1984	2,731	49.68%	2,685	48.84%	81	1.47%
1988	2,116	42.46%	2,805	56.29%	62	1.24%
1992	1,435	28.88%	2,342	47.14%	1,191	23.97%
1996	1,447	32.41%	2,420	54.20%	598	13.39%
2000	1,941	43.59%	2,244	50.39%	268	6.02%
2004	2,093	46.09%	2,390	52.63%	58	1.28%
2008	1,912	45.61%	2,160	51.53%	120	2.86%
2012	1,938	48.64%	1,974	49.55%	72	1.81%
2016	2,293	59.40%	1,305	33.81%	262	6.79%
2020	2,528	62.57%	1,446	35.79%	66	1.63%
2024	2,600	65.07%	1,314	32.88%	82	2.05%

== Education ==
School districts include:

- Canby Public School District
- Dawson-Boyd Public School District
- Lac qui Parle Valley School District
- Montevideo Public School District
- Ortonville Public School
- Yellow Medicine East School District

== See also ==
- National Register of Historic Places listings in Lac qui Parle County, Minnesota
