= Lac qui Parle (disambiguation) =

Lac qui Parle is a lake in Minnesota.

Lac qui Parle may also refer to:

- Lac qui Parle County Airport
- Lac qui Parle County Courthouse
- Lac qui Parle County, Minnesota
- Lac qui Parle County seat controversy
- Lac qui Parle, Minnesota
- Lac qui Parle Mission
- Lac qui Parle River
- Lac qui Parle State Park
- Lac qui Parle Township, Lac qui Parle County, Minnesota
- Lac qui Parle Valley School District

== See also ==
- National Register of Historic Places listings in Lac qui Parle County, Minnesota
