= National Register of Historic Places listings in Chippewa County, Minnesota =

Location of Chippewa County in Minnesota

This is a list of the National Register of Historic Places listings in Chippewa County, Minnesota. It is intended to be a complete list of the properties and districts on the National Register of Historic Places in Chippewa County, Minnesota, United States. The locations of National Register properties and districts for which the latitude and longitude coordinates are included below, may be seen in an online map.

There are 9 properties and districts listed on the National Register in the county.

This National Park Service list is complete through NPS recent listings posted August 28, 2026.

== Current listings ==
	Name on the Register	Image	Date listed	Location	City or town	Description
1	Charles H. Budd House	Charles H. Budd House	September 19, 1977 (#77000726)	219 N. 3rd St. 44°56′50″N 95°43′24″W	Montevideo	1909 house of an influential early settler (arriving in 1872) who was active in local law, politics, banking, and civics.
2	Chicago, Milwaukee and St. Paul Depot	Chicago, Milwaukee and St. Paul Depot	October 27, 1988 (#88002079)	301 State Rd. 44°56′29″N 95°43′22″W	Montevideo	1901 passenger depot, the only remaining building of a large Milwaukee Road division headquarters that spurred Montevideo's development. Now a railway museum.
3	Chippewa County Bank	Chippewa County Bank	September 19, 1977 (#77000727)	302 N. 1st St. 44°56′51″N 95°43′28″W	Montevideo	1900 Romanesque Revival commercial building constructed to house Montevideo's oldest bank, established in 1870.
4	Henry Gippe Farmstead	Henry Gippe Farmstead	September 25, 1985 (#85002558)	8085 U.S. Route 59; 44°59′38″N 95°46′23″W	Watson vicinity	1865 farm with an ornate 1887 house; one of Chippewa County's first permanent homesteads and its oldest surviving brick farmhouse.
5	Lac qui Parle Mission Archeological Historic District	Lac qui Parle Mission Archeological Historic District	March 14, 1973 (#73000971)	Address restricted 45°01′25″N 95°52′05″W	Montevideo vicinity	Site of the 1826 Fort Renville trading post and an 1841 mission church (reconstructed in the 1940s), plus associated Euro-American and Dakota habitations. Extends into Lac qui Parle County.
6	Maynard State Bank	Maynard State Bank	May 29, 2018 (#100002501)	330 Cynthia St. 44°54′27″N 95°28′11″W	Maynard	Well-preserved example of Neoclassical architecture applied to a small-town bank, built in 1915. Now the Maynard History Museum.
7	Montevideo Carnegie Library	Montevideo Carnegie Library	August 26, 1982 (#82002938)	125 N. 3rd St. 44°56′47″N 95°43′24″W	Montevideo	1906 Carnegie library in use until 1968, featuring a modest local adaptation of Neoclassical architecture.
8	Olof Swensson Farmstead	Olof Swensson Farmstead	December 30, 1974 (#74001010)	115 100th St. SE; 44°52′43″N 95°35′33″W	Granite Falls vicinity	1873 homestead of a Norwegian immigrant (1843–1923) noted for his self-sufficient construction and eccentric reform efforts. Now the Swensson Farm Museum.
9	Julian A. Weaver House	Julian A. Weaver House	June 20, 1986 (#86001344)	863 Lincoln Ave. (originally 837 Minnesota Ave.); 44°48′27″N 95°32′02″W	Granite Falls	Circa-1878 house of Granite Falls' first railway agent; also notable as one of the region's few intact 1870s residences.

== See also ==
- List of National Historic Landmarks in Minnesota
- National Register of Historic Places listings in Minnesota
