= Love Thy Neighbor =

Love thy neighbor (also love thy neighbour) is a biblical commandment to love others as oneself. Originating in Leviticus 19:18, it is reiterated by Jesus in the New Testament as the second Great Commandment: "And the second is like unto it, Thou shalt love thy neighbour as thyself." (Matthew 22:39)

Love thy neighbor may also refer to:

== Film ==
- Love Thy Neighbor (1940 film), an American film
- Love Thy Neighbour (1967 film), a Danish-German comedy film
- Love Thy Neighbour (1973 film), a British film based on the situation comedy series
- Love Thy Neighbor (1984 film), an American television-film
- Love Thy Neighbor (2003 film), a direct-to-video animated film directed by Tony Bancroft
- Love Thy Neighbor (2005 film), with Scott Wolf
- Love Thy Neighbor (2006 film), a Canadian television-film

== Television ==
- Love Thy Neighbour (1972 TV series), a 1972–1976 British situation comedy series
- Love Thy Neighbor, a 1973 American comedy series starring Joyce Bulifant and Ron Masak
- Love Thy Neighbour (Australian TV series), a 1980 sitcom, a sequel to the 1972 British series
- Love Thy Neighbour (Singaporean TV series), a 2011 MediaCorp Channel 8 Singaporean Mandarin drama
- Love Thy Neighbor (American TV series), a 2013–2017 comedy series that aired on OWN
- "Love Thy Neighbour" (Doctors), a 2004 episode

== Literature ==
- Love Thy Neighbor (book), 2019 memoir by Ayaz Virji and Alan Eisenstock
- Love Thy Neighbor: The Tory Diary of Prudence Emerson, a novel in the Dear America series
- Love Thy Neighbor, a 2019 audiobook by voice actress, writer, producer Hillary Hawkins
- Love Thy Neighbor: A Story of War, the book by Peter Maass

== Music ==
- "Love Thy Neighbor", a song from the musical The Prom
- "Love Thy Neighbor", a song from the 1934 film We're Not Dressing

== See also ==
- Book of Leviticus (19:18, "thou shalt love thy neighbor as thyself")
  - Great Commandment
