= Clarence H. Carter =

Clarence H. Carter may refer to:

- Clarence Holbrook Carter (1904–2000), American artist
- Clarence H. Carter (Wisconsin politician) (1875–1958), member of the Wisconsin State Assembly
