= Lac qui Parle County seat controversy =

1880s battle for county seat in Minnesota

- Duration: April 1885 to May 21, 1889
- Location: Lac qui Parle County, Minnesota, US
- Cause: Expansion of the Minneapolis and St. Louis Railway
- Outcome: Madison, Minnesota as Lac qui Parle County seat

Lac qui Parle County, in Minnesota, United States, had two battles for its county seat during the 1800s. The first was between Williamsburg and Lac qui Parle Village. The second was between Dawson and Madison which culminated in the county courthouse being stolen and a case being brought to the Minnesota Supreme Court.

After the establishment of Lac qui Parle County in 1871 by the Minnesota Legislature, a dispute over the county seat almost immediately erupted between Williamsburg (now a ghost town) and Lac qui Parle Village. In 1872, Lac qui Parle Village was declared to be the county seat. The county board met in the hotel and post office building of Lac qui Parle Village from 1871 to 1875, then in a rented space in the local general store until 1883 when a new wooden frame courthouse was built. This courthouse was 30 by 40 feet (9.1 by 12.2 m) and two stories high.

== Dispute ==
In 1884, the Minneapolis and St. Louis Railway was built through the county, but bypassed Lac qui Parle Village. This stunted the community's opportunities for future growth. Two new towns were founded in 1884 along the railway's route, Dawson and Madison. In April 1885, Dawson and Madison sparked a new battle for the county seat. Residents of both towns petitioned the county board for the relocation of the county seat and an election was scheduled for November 1886. During the year and a half before the election, the Dawson Eagle and the Madison Press, newspapers representing their respective towns, entered an editorial battle on issues like the county seat and their subsequent rivalry, spurred on by local business leaders, which continued until the 1900s. The animosity and actions between the two cities was called a "county seat war" by various newspapers at the time.

On November 5, 1886, Madison was chosen as the new county seat by 1,173 votes to 703. When the results were announced in Dawson, a county officer issued an injunction against moving county records from Lac qui Parle Village to Madison.

On November 12, 150 men and 40 teams of horses from Madison violated the injunction. They secretly rode to Lac qui Parle Village during the night, broke into the courthouse around 2 am, seized county records from a brick vault, and stole the safe of the county treasurer. It was at this time the burglars began the process of physically moving the courthouse to Madison, 15 miles (24 km) away.

Moving the courthouse took nearly a week due to a blizzard. The courthouse was taken secretly, and was described as a "kidnapping". While the courthouse was being moved, those that were hauling it stopped for lunch near a school. While the courthouse was left in position near the school, students entered and took cookies from inside the building. On the way to Madison the courthouse, which was being pulled on four large trucks, sank into a quagmire and got stuck. The courthouse did make it to Madison, however. Once the journey was completed, the courthouse was placed on its present site, which had been offered for this purpose by the Madison Townsite Company as an attempt to persuade voters to choose Madison as the county seat.

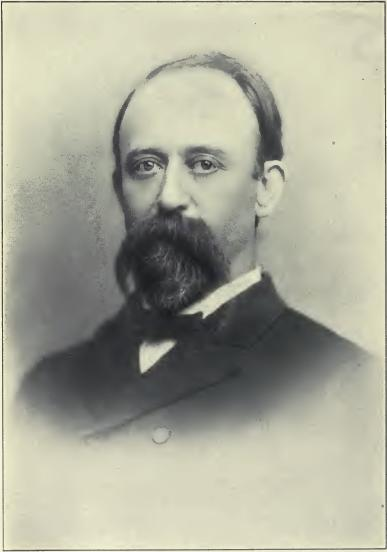
Governor Lucius Frederick Hubbard

When it was realized that the courthouse was being moved, a telegram was sent from H. Steinarson, the county auditor, to Governor Lucius Frederick Hubbard: "The county records are being removed to Madison, and the court house [sic] is being torn down while injunction is served upon the county officers not to let anything be moved. Business suspended. What shall I do in the matter?" The governor sent back a reply: "The county attorney and sheriff will be able to secure obedience to the law and the courts."

A legal battle ensued, culminating in the case being heard by the Minnesota Supreme Court in September 1887. The court ruled that the law under which the county seat election was held was unconstitutional. County records were then moved back to Lac qui Parle Village under a court order. In 1888, residents elected Jacob F. Jacobson, a Madison citizen who had helped drag the courthouse to Madison, to the Minnesota House of Representatives, hoping he would enact a law allowing for the county seat to be changed. Jacobson was successful, and on May 21, 1889, Madison was officially approved as the county seat of Lac qui Parle County.

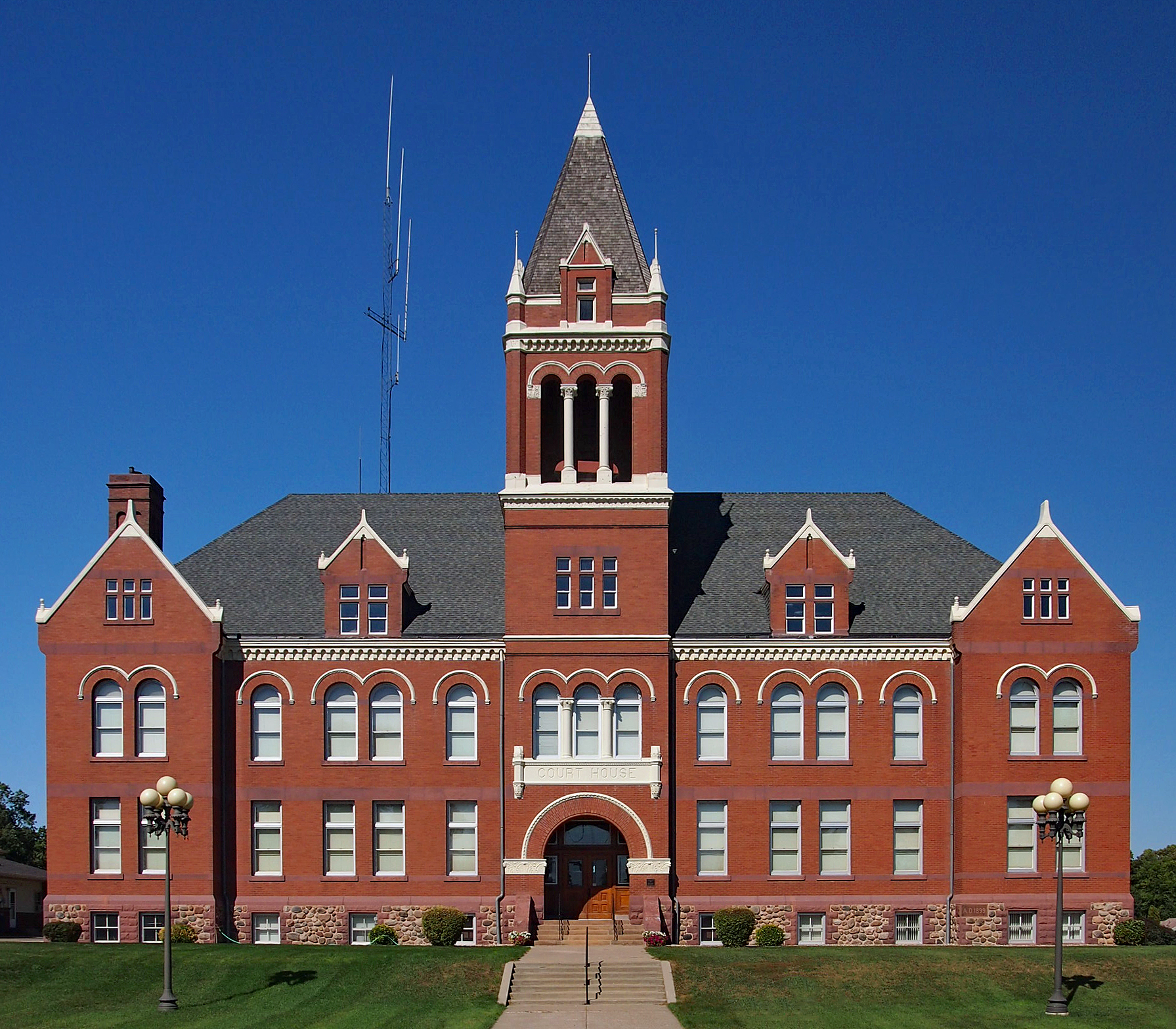
New Lac qui Parle County Courthouse, built in 1899

A new county courthouse was built in 1899, which was placed on the National Register of Historic Places in 1985. On June 21, 1899, a cornerstone-laying ceremony was held. Animosity over the dispute lingered—when representatives from Maxwell Township (which is closer to Dawson than Madison) were invited to attend the ceremony, the township replied: "Lay your own cornerstone!"

=== In media ===
Johannes B. Wist used the episode of the theft of the courthouse in The Rise of Jonas Olsen, a serialized fictional column in Decorah-Posten, which has since been published as a book in English, translated from the original Norwegian.

== See also ==
- Lac qui Parle County
- Lac qui Parle County Courthouse
- County seat war
