= Williamsburg, Minnesota =

Williamsburg
- Ghost town
- Location within Minnesota Location within the United States
- Coordinates: 45°0′10″N 95°58′21″W
- Country: United States
- State: Minnesota
- County: Lac qui Parle
- Platted: 1868
- Founder: William Mills and Peter Jacobson

Williamsburg, Minnesota is an extinct town, and the first townsite in Lac qui Parle County, Minnesota.

== Land ownership ==
The area of Williamsburg has been home to Native American peoples for over 9,000 years. The first European nation claim to the area was France in 1682 when explorer La Salle claimed the Mississippi Watershed as a part of New France. As a result of the French and Indian War, the land was given to Spain in 1763. The land was then back in French hands in 1800 before being sold to the United States in 1803 as a part of the Louisiana Purchase.

In 1851, the United States officially declared the area Dakota reservation land as a part of the Treaty of Traverse de Sioux. However, on February 16, 1863, the Senate broke all treaties with the Dakota as a result of the US-Dakota War of 1862. This put the land under the ownership of the State of Minnesota, which opened it for European American settlement.

== Founding ==
William Mills, an early settler of Lac qui Parle County, settled on the banks of the Lac qui Parle River in 1868. In 1869, Peter Jacobson led twenty Iowan families to the same place. Jacobson's claim was next to Mills's claim, and the two platted Williamsburg during the summer of 1869.

== History ==
During the fall of 1869, Peter Jacobson opened a store on his farm as well as trading with Native Americans for furs and other supplies.

On June 1, 1870, the first Lutheran church in Lac qui Parle County and the Upper Minnesota Valley was organized in Williamsburg. The congregation held services in homes and outdoors until April 1871 when the congregation became interested in finding a church and cemetery site. A site was chosen and a cemetery started, however due to accessibility concerns for the church structure, the actual church was built one mile west of the cemetery. The cemetery was used until 1884 and the church (Lac qui Parle Lutheran Church) is still active today.

The first election of the area was held in the house of William Mills, which elected county officials despite the fact that a county representing the area had not been formed yet. Lac qui Parle County would not be legally created until 1871. In November 1871, an official election was held to elect an official county board which would be responsible for denoting a county seat. The two towns hoping for the county seat position were Williamsburg and Lac qui Parle Village. Supporting Williamsburg were S. A. Anderson, Jacob F. Jacobson, and Frederick Ehlers, while Browning Nichols and Colben Anderson represented Lac qui Parle. Browning Nichols, Colben Anderson, and Frederick Ehlers won the election and on January 11, 1872, Lac qui Parle Village was named the county seat.

In 1889, Madison would be named the new county seat.

== Abandonment ==
In 1870, Mr. Donaldson would open his own store, however after Lac qui Parle Village was named county seat, he moved his store there. This would be true for much of Williamsburg. The naming of Lac qui Parle Village as county seat was a "death knell" for the town.

Today, the land that housed Williamsburg is located in the Lac qui Parle County Park and much of what is left is relegated to the cemetery and Lutheran church.

== See also ==
- List of ghost towns in Minnesota
- Lac qui Parle Village
