= Token Creek, Wisconsin =

- unincorporated community
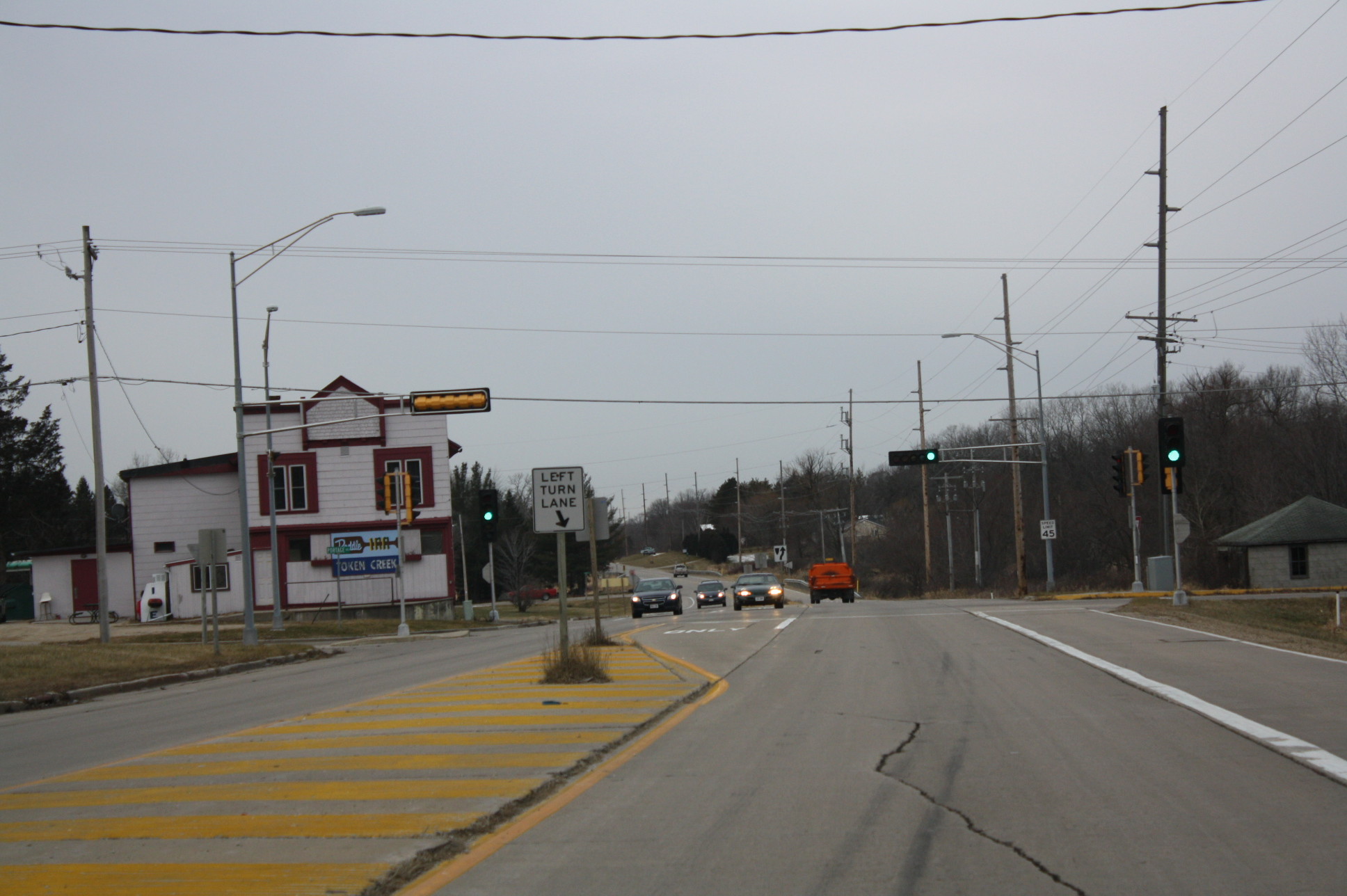
- Downtown Token Creek

- Location within Wisconsin Location within the United States
- Coordinates: 43°11′40″N 89°17′37″W
- Country: United States
- State: Wisconsin
- County: Dane County
- Town: Burke
- Elevation: 883 ft (269 m)
- Time zone: UTC-6 (Central (CST))
  - Summer (DST): UTC-5 (CDT)
- Area code: 608
- GNIS feature ID: 1575480

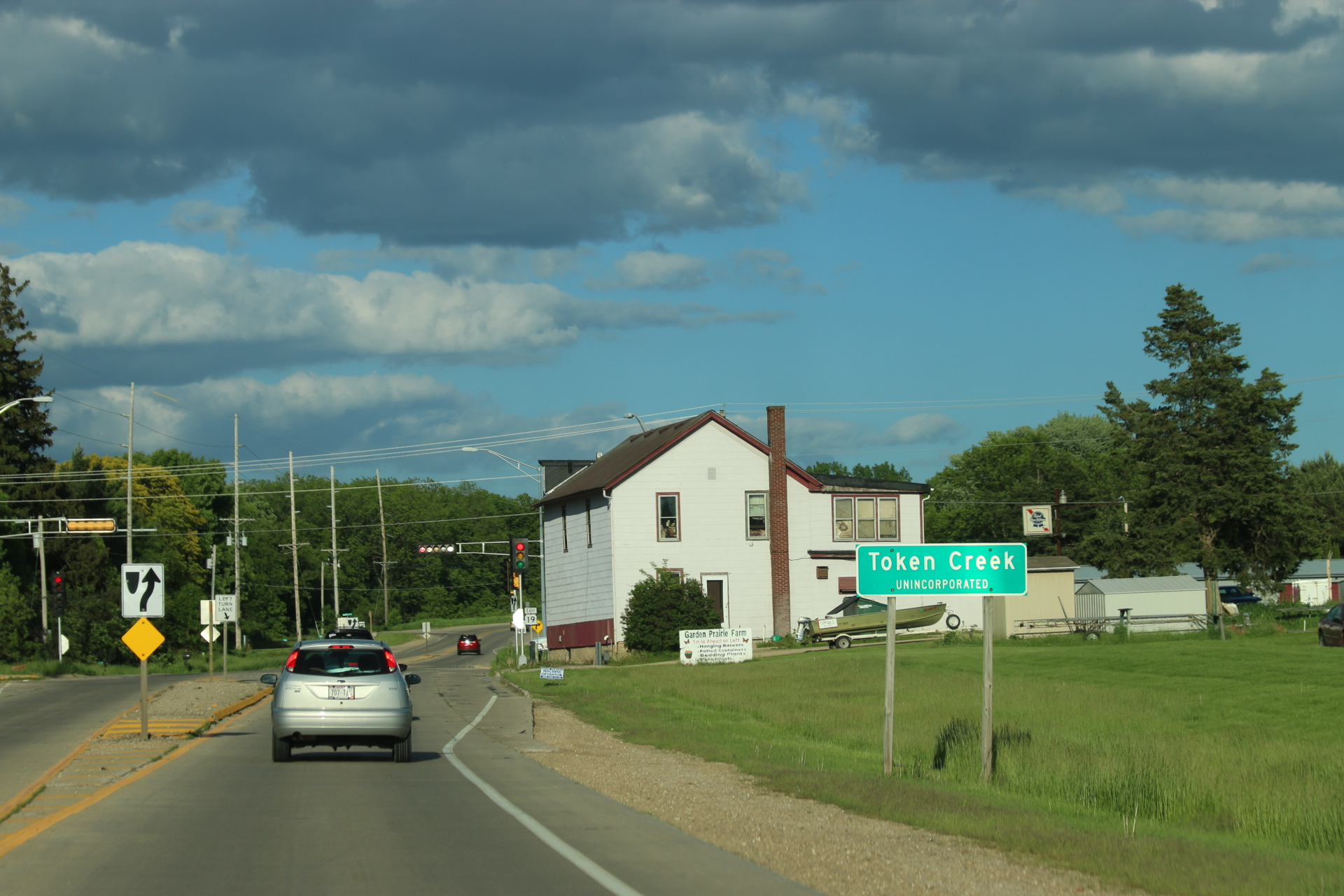
Looking east at the sign for Token Creek on WIS19

Token Creek is a community in Dane County, Wisconsin, United States. Token Creek was once an unincorporated community and roughly the southern half of the community remains unincorporated. In 2015, roughly half the community became included in the newly incorporated village of Windsor, giving that part of the community the status of a neighborhood within the village. By the year 2036, the remainder of Token Creek is slated to be annexed primarily by the city of Sun Prairie with the city of Madison also annexing the western and southwestern portions of the community. This will cause the community to be fully incorporated, albeit split among three municipalities. Wisconsin Highway 19 crosses east to west through the community. Some areas previously defined as a part of Token Creek have also been annexed by the village of DeForest.

Token Creek is named after a creek which runs into a pond in the community. Token Creek also borders the county run Token Creek Natural Resource Area and Token Creek County Park. While Token Creek originally developed as a small rural unincorporated community, growth in Dane County has changed the character of the area to more suburban serving as a bedroom community with many residents commuting to Madison or employment centers in DeForest and Sun Prairie.
