= National Register of Historic Places listings in Lac qui Parle County, Minnesota =

Location of Lac qui Parle County in Minnesota

This is a list of the National Register of Historic Places listings in Lac qui Parle County, Minnesota. It is intended to be a complete list of the properties and districts on the National Register of Historic Places in Lac qui Parle County, Minnesota, United States. The locations of National Register properties and districts for which the latitude and longitude coordinates are included below, may be seen in an online map.

There are 10 properties and districts listed on the National Register in the county. A supplementary list includes three additional sites that were formerly on the National Register.

This National Park Service list is complete through NPS recent listings posted August 1, 2025.

== Current listings ==
	Name on the Register	Image	Date listed	Location	City or town	Description
1	Camp Release State Monument	Camp Release State Monument	March 14, 1973 (#73000981)	About 2 miles southwest of Montevideo off U.S. Route 212; 44°55′58″N 95°44′54″W	Montevideo vicinity	Surrender site where prisoners taken by the Dakota people were released at the conclusion of the Dakota War of 1862 and the first military trials were held. Marked with an 1894 monument.
2	Commercial Bank Building	Commercial Bank Building	January 28, 1982 (#82002978)	6th St. 44°55′46″N 96°03′16″W	Dawson	Well-preserved example of a 19th-century Richardsonian Romanesque bank, built in 1892 for Christopher M. Anderson, an influential early pioneer and civic leader in Lac qui Parle County, and founder of Dawson. The building is currently being used as a museum of the city of Dawson.
3	Dawson Armory and Community Building	Dawson Armory and Community Building	May 18, 1995 (#95000615)	676 Pine St. 44°55′45″N 96°03′20″W	Dawson	Multipurpose 1923 facility representative of the Minnesota National Guard armories of the 1920s, and the long-serving center of Dawson's civic life, housing the city's offices and principal meeting spaces. The building is currently being used as a public library and apartment building.
4	Dawson Carnegie Library	Dawson Carnegie Library	August 15, 1985 (#85001770)	677 Pine St. 44°55′43″N 96°03′20″W	Dawson	Neoclassical Carnegie library built 1917–8, representing the philanthropy of the Carnegie Foundation, the work of regional architect A. H. Foss, and the civic importance of the Dawson Public Library, founded in the 1890s. The building is currently being used as a law office.
5	Lac qui Parle County Courthouse	Lac qui Parle County Courthouse	August 15, 1985 (#85001759)	600 6th St. 45°00′54″N 96°11′35″W	Madison	Monumental 1899 courthouse designed by Buechner & Jacobson, and a symbol of Madison's triumph in a protracted 17-year battle for county seat status.
6	Lac qui Parle Mission Archeological Historic District	Lac qui Parle Mission Archeological Historic District	March 14, 1973 (#73000971)	Address restricted 45°01′28″N 95°52′04″W	Montevideo vicinity	Sites of the 1826 Fort Renville trading post and an 1841 mission church (reconstructed in the 1940s), plus associated Euro-American and Dakota habitations. Extends into Chippewa County.
7	Lac qui Parle State Park WPA/Rustic Style Historic District	Lac qui Parle State Park WPA/Rustic Style Historic District	August 19, 1991 (#91001055)	Off County Highway 33 at the southeastern end of Lac qui Parle; 45°01′17″N 95°53′11″W	Montevideo vicinity	Three park facilities built 1938–41, significant as examples of Depression-era federal work relief, the extensive New Deal projects conducted around Lac qui Parle, and National Park Service rustic architecture.
8	Louisburg School	Louisburg School	June 20, 1986 (#86001348)	1st St. at 3rd Ave. 45°10′06″N 96°10′17″W	Louisburg	One of west-central Minnesota's best examples of a Victorian public school—built in 1911—and an emblem of the efforts in the state's small communities to provide local school facilities.
9	Madison Carnegie Library	Madison Carnegie Library	August 23, 1985 (#85001823)	401 6th Ave. 45°00′45″N 96°11′37″W	Madison	One of west-central Minnesota's earliest and most stylistically unusual Carnegie libraries, built 1905–6, and one of three monumental public buildings forming Madison's distinctive civic campus.
10	Madison City Hall	Madison City Hall	August 23, 1985 (#85001820)	404 6th Ave. 45°00′45″N 96°11′34″W	Madison	Neoclassical city hall and opera house designed by Buechner & Orth and built 1902–3, a long-serving center of civic and social life and a representative of Madison's expansive early-20th-century community planning.

== Former listings ==
	Name on the Register	Image	Date listed	Date removed	Location	City or town	Description
1	Hotel Lac qui Parle		December 6, 1990 (#90001820)	August 2, 2000	202 6th Ave.	Madison	1902 hotel. Demolished in 1999.
2	Andreus Thoreson Farmhouse		November 15, 1974 (#74001030)	February 13, 1991	Off CR 64	Madison	Ornate 1899 Queen Anne farmhouse of a prominent settler (1832–1914). Burned down by an accidental fire in 1989.
3	Yellow Bank Church Campground Bridge		November 6, 1989 (#89001831)	June 30, 1998	Twp. Rd. 76 over Yellow Bank River (original location); Current coordinates are 44°37′49″N 92°50′25″W	Odessa	1893 truss bridge of a unique design by the King Bridge Company. Moved in 1994 to the Little Log House Pioneer Village outside Hastings, Minnesota, to complete a replica of the 1895 Hastings Spiral Bridge.

== See also ==
- List of National Historic Landmarks in Minnesota
- National Register of Historic Places listings in Minnesota
