= Zach Durfee =

American football player (born 2001)

No. 58 – Jacksonville Jaguars
- Position: Defensive end
- Roster status: Injured reserve

Personal information
- Born: October 5, 2001 (age 25); Dawson, Minnesota, U.S.
- Listed height: 6 ft 5 in (1.96 m)
- Listed weight: 258 lb (117 kg)

Career information
- High school: Dawson-Boyd (Dawson, Minnesota)
- College: Sioux Falls (2022); Washington (2023–2025)
- NFL draft: 2026: 7th round, 233rd overall pick

Career history
- Jacksonville Jaguars (2026–present)
- Stats at Pro Football Reference

Zachary Durfee Jr. (born October 5, 2001) is an American professional football defensive end for the Jacksonville Jaguars of the National Football League (NFL). He played college football for the Washington Huskies and was selected by the Jaguars in the seventh round of the 2026 NFL draft.

== Early life ==
Durfee grew up in Dawson, Minnesota and his older brother Adam played college baseball at Augustana. He attended Dawson-Boyd High School. He was a standout basketball player for the team and averaged 21 points and 10 rebounds per game as a senior. Durfee played football as a quarterback, wide receiver and safety, though he missed significant time because of injuries, including a broken leg as a junior. He considered playing basketball at the Division III level but ultimately joined North Dakota State University.

== College career ==
Durfee initially attended North Dakota State University but did not play collegiate sports. He transferred to Division II Sioux Falls and joined the football team, redshirting his first season. In 2022, Durfee had 11 sacks and 13.5 tackles for a loss in his first season of college football. He transferred to Washington and sat out the 2023 season due to transfer regulations while the Huskies reached the College Football Playoff championship. Durfee was disrupted by turf toe injuries in 2024 and made three starts, registering 16 tackles, 3.5 tackles for a loss, 2.5 sacks and a pass deflection. In 2025, he was named a captain and played in 11 games, making 37 tackles, had five tackles for a loss and four sacks. Durfee declared for the 2026 NFL draft after the season.

== Professional career ==
Pre-draft measurables
| Height | Weight | Arm length | Hand span | Wingspan | 40-yard dash | 10-yard split | 20-yard split | 20-yard shuttle | Three-cone drill | Vertical jump | Broad jump |
|---|---|---|---|---|---|---|---|---|---|---|---|
| 6 ft 4 3/4 in (1.95 m) | 247 lb (112 kg) | 31 1/2 in (0.80 m) | 9 3/4 in (0.25 m) | 6 ft 4 3/8 in (1.94 m) | 4.62 s | 1.64 s | 2.67 s | 4.40 s | 7.01 s | 39.0 in (0.99 m) | 10 ft 3 in (3.12 m) |
All values from Pro Day

Durfee was selected in the seventh round of the 2026 NFL draft with the 233rd overall pick by the Jacksonville Jaguars. He was placed on injured reserve due to an upper–body injury on August 30, 2026.
