= Morrisonville, Wisconsin =

- Former unincorporated community
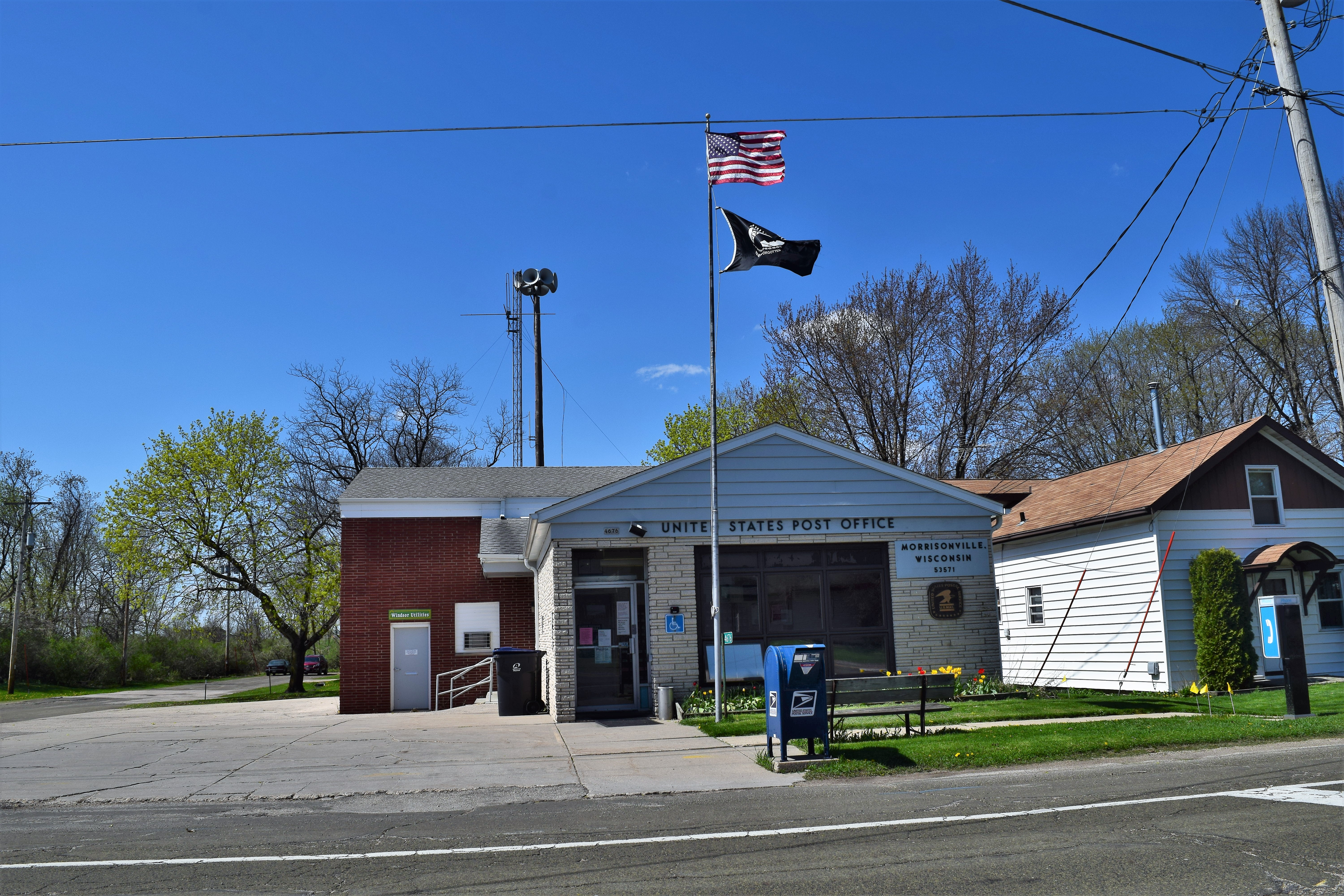
- Morrisonville post office

- Location within Wisconsin Location within the United States
- Coordinates: 43°16′38″N 89°21′34″W
- Country: United States
- State: Wisconsin
- County: Dane County
- Elevation: 961 ft (293 m)
- Time zone: UTC-6 (Central (CST))
  - Summer (DST): UTC-5 (CDT)
- ZIP code: 53571
- Area code: 608
- GNIS feature ID: 1569760

Morrisonville is a neighborhood in the village of Windsor, in Dane County, Wisconsin, United States, approximately 18 miles (29 km) north of Madison. The Yahara River flows through the community. The main road running through Morrisonville is County Trunk DM, which connects from State Highway 51 approximately 8 miles (13 km) to the village of Dane. At each entrance into the town on DM is a welcome sign calling Morrisonville "Frogtown U.S.A."

== History ==
Morrisonville is named after James Morrison, a Scottish immigrant who had settled in the area by June 6, 1843. He purchased approximately 290 acres of land from the United States government. He and his family originally lived in a temporary shelter above the headwaters of the Yahara River before moving into a log structure that was expanded and firmly established by 1851.

=== Morrisonville Depot ===
In the 1860s construction began on the Milwaukee Road railroad. Morrison sold 43 acres (170,000 m^{2}) of land to a prospective railroad company in 1862 on the contingency that a station be built in the area where Morrison and his family lived. It is not known exactly when construction began on the Morrisonville depot, but the structure was designed by J. U. Nettenstrom based upon the exact designs of the Summit and Pierpont depots. The Madison and Portage Railroad Company formed on August 9, 1870, in order to build a portion of the railroad spanning from Madison to Portage and received aid from Madison, Portage and other neighboring towns. The original depot was 20' by 48' long, made entirely of wood, and located on the eastern side of the railroad tracks running through Morrisonville. The adjoining, double-doored freight room measured 20' by 27' long. The depot was sold and moved after passenger service on the railway was ended. The Depot is currently owned by the Morrisonville Depot Preservation Society and in the process of being restored and moved, to the North, one block. Property has been purchased by the MDPS (Morrisonville Depot Preservation Society) one block North of the present depot location. Spring of 2013 is the tentative time frame for move to the new site.

| Preceding station | Milwaukee Road | Following station |
|---|---|---|
| DeForest toward Madison | Madison – Portage | Arlington toward Portage |

=== Post office ===
The local post office was established on May 10, 1871. Because another town in Wisconsin was named Morrison, the government added "ville" to distinguish between the two, thus giving Morrisonville its name.

=== Flourish and later decline ===
Sometime in August 1871 the railroad was activated. The railway was leased and later sold in 1878 to the Chicago, Milwaukee, St. Paul and Pacific Railroad. In the early years of Morrisonville and into the 20th century, the railroad brought much business and commerce to the community. Many residences and businesses, including a hotel and stable, were established. A large number of goods, including tobacco, passed through the town, making it a local center for commerce.

By the mid-20th century, travel and commerce on the railways had declined greatly and passenger service for the Madison to Portage railroad ended in 1952. A local feed company bought the depot and moved the building to the location in which it sits today.

== Morrisonville today ==
Morrisonville is served by the Canadian Pacific Kansas City railroad. The post office remains in its original location, with an addition housing local county equipment, such as a snowplow. The hotel is now a residence and has been renovated. The train depot sits in an otherwise bare lot and is visible from all sides. The original bar and brothel, which were one building during the peak of the railroad business, are now two buildings on separate lots.

In 2015 the town of Windsor which Morrisonville is located within voted to incorporate into a village, prior to that Morrisonville was an unincorporated area within the town.
