= Middleton station =

Historic railway depot in Middleton, Wisconsin

Middleton
- Middleton station in 2019.

General information
- Location: 1811 Parmenter Street, Middleton, Wisconsin 53562
- System: Former Milwaukee Road passenger rail station

History
- Closed: 1960

Services
Preceding station	Milwaukee Road	Following station
Cross Plains toward Rapid City	Rapid City – Madison	Madison Terminus
- Middleton Depot, Chicago, Milwaukee, and St. Paul Railroad
- U.S. National Register of Historic Places
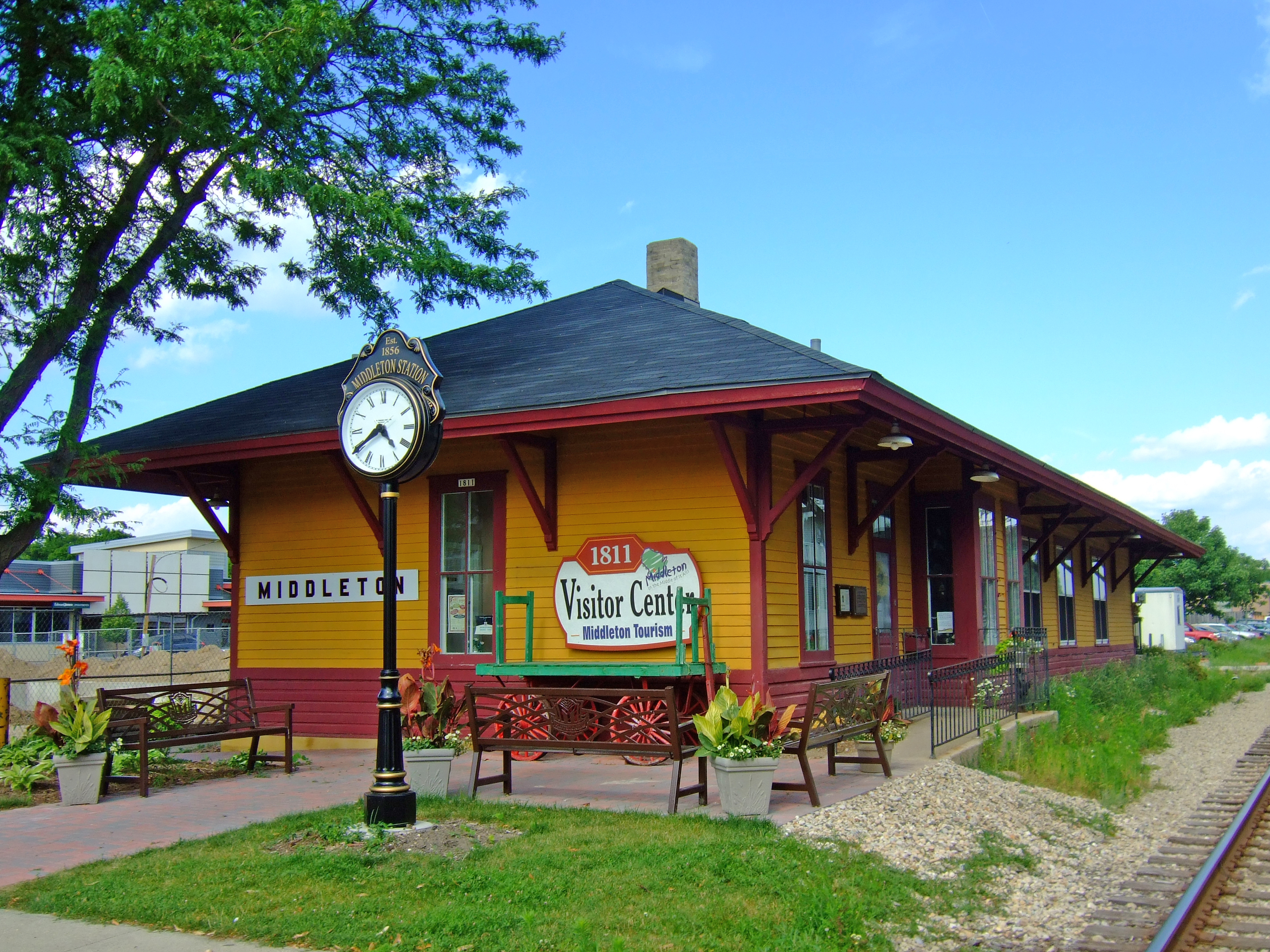

- Location within Wisconsin
- Location: 1811 Parmenter St; Middleton, Wisconsin
- Coordinates: 43°5′42″N 89°30′40″W
- Built: 1895
- Architect: J. U. Nettenstrom
- Architectural style: Late Victorian
- NRHP reference No.: 99000520
- Added to NRHP: April 29, 1999
Location

The Middleton Depot is a railway depot built by the Chicago, Milwaukee, St. Paul and Pacific Railroad (also known as The Milwaukee Road) in 1895 in Middleton, Wisconsin. In 1999 it was listed on the National Register of Historic Places.

In 1841 the first Europeans settled around what would become Middleton. The city began to take form fifteen years later when the Milwaukee and Mississippi Railroad built tracks through the area in 1856. That year the village of Middleton Station was platted around the tracks. The following year a general store was built near the place where Parmenter Street now crosses the tracks, establishing this junction as the commercial hub of the village. Warehouses, grain elevators, hotels, stores steadily sprouted around this shipping terminal, and houses around them.

Shortly after the railroad came through, B.C. Slaughter built a warehouse just north of the tracks which served as the first railroad depot and post office. In 1869 the railroad built its own depot, which served until it burned in 1895. That same year the railroad built a replacement depot which survives to this day.

The depot is largely one of the standard designs used by the Chicago, Milwaukee and St. Paul at that time—a rectangular single-story wood-frame building with a hip roof and broad overhanging eaves supported by knee braces. The roof's ridge was originally decorated with wooden cresting, but that has been removed. The depot was originally 24 by 60 feet, containing a passenger waiting room, a freight room and a station agent's office. The freight room was extended by twenty-four feet some time after 1919.

The depot served passenger trains until 1960 and was used as a freight depot until 1975. The depot was sold to the City of Middleton, which uses it as a senior citizen's center. In 1999 it was listed on the National Register of Historic Places because of its architecture and also because of its association with the development of railroads in Middleton and Wisconsin.
