= Dawson Bank Museum =

Coordinates: 44°55′46″N 96°03′16″W

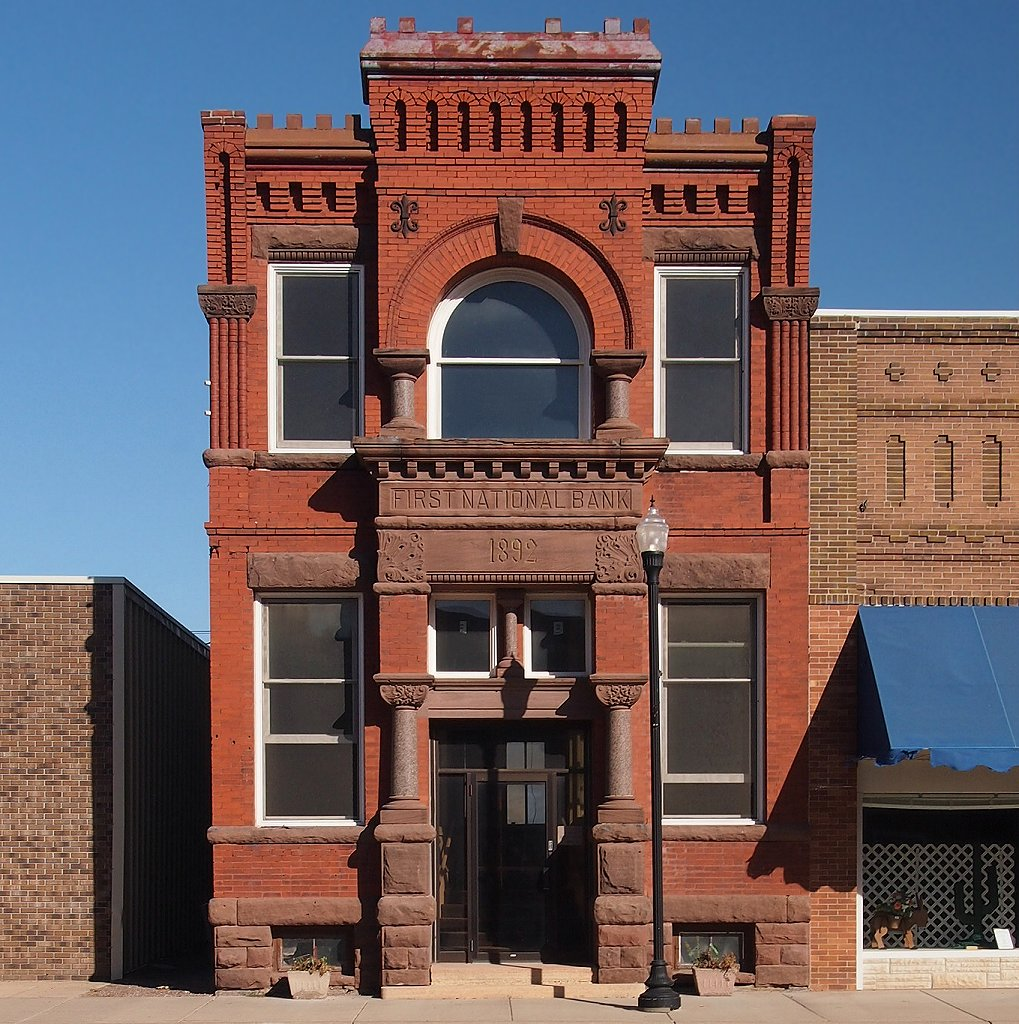
- Former name: Commercial Bank Building, First National Bank Building
- Established: January 18, 2018
- Location: Dawson Lac qui Parle County, Minnesota, US
- Type: Community Museum
- Owner: Dennis Anderson
- Website: https://www.gluseum.com/US/Dawson/1129803743790180/The-Dawson-Bank-Museum

The Dawson Bank Museum is a museum operating inside of the former First National Bank Building in Dawson, Minnesota. The building is listed on the National Register of Historic Places.

== Renovation of the museum ==
Renovation of the First National Bank Building began in the late 2010s, and was finished in 2018. The museum receives some funding from community donations, including the Dennis, Ruby, Cheryl, and Steven Anderson Advised Fund.

== Artifacts of interest ==
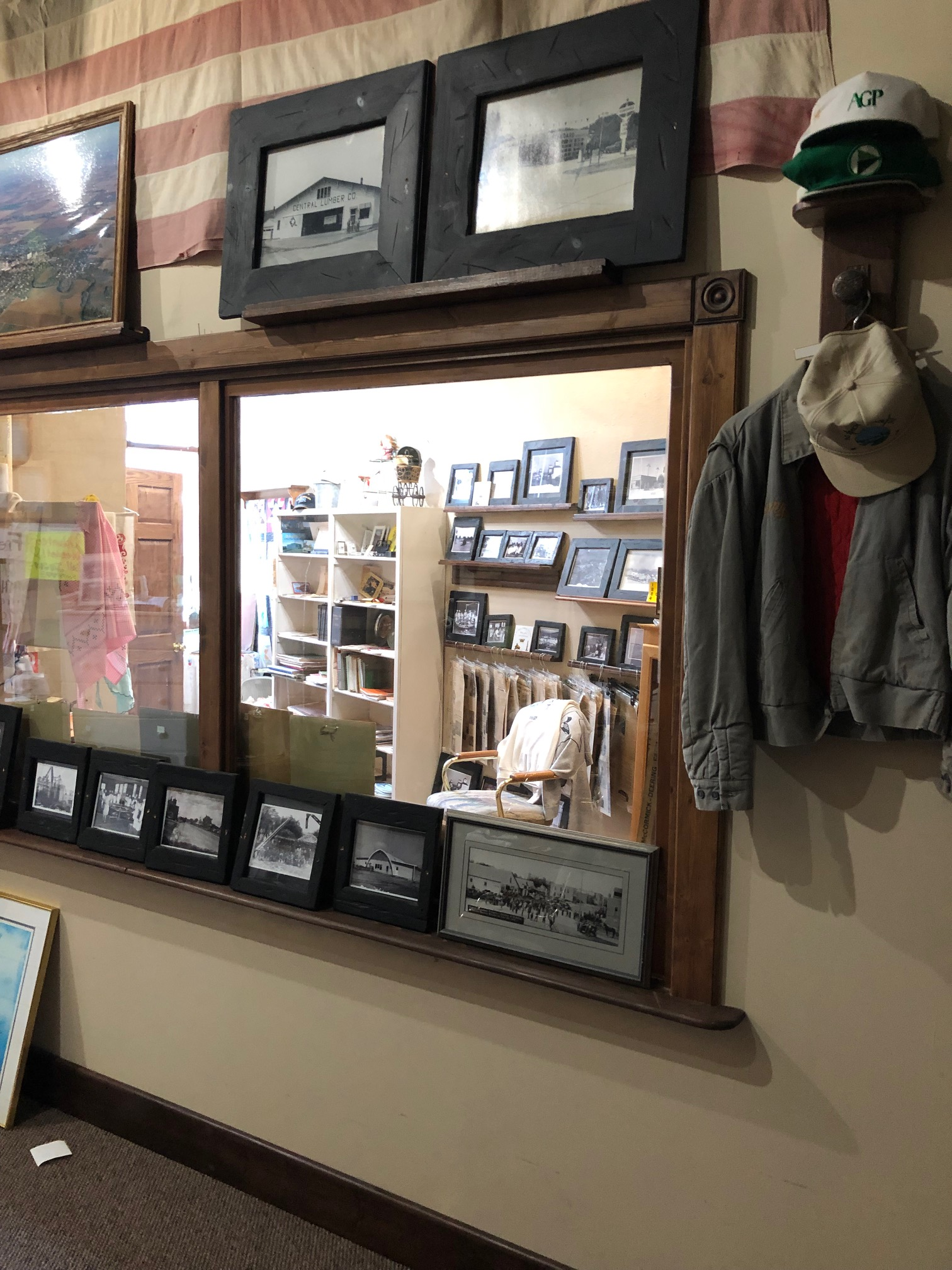
Exhibit of local photos and artifacts

The Dawson Bank Museum holds many artifacts of interest including;

- A 1930s projector from the Grand Theater, a building located across the street from the museum
  - The projector was used from the 1930s–1960s
  - Roger Perkins, a projector operator in the area, wrote a story about the projector.
- Calendars dating back to the 1930s
- 1942 Dawson Football Champions Trophy
  - The trophy's inscription reads; 1942 Football Champions / Season's scores / Dawson 63 Opponents 0
  - Loaned by the family of Robin Winge
- Ethel Mahlam Doll Collection
  - Donated by Ruby Anderson

=== Rooms ===
- Veterans' Room
  - Dedicated to World War I, World War II, and Korean War veterans
  - Contains model airplanes
  - Second floor of museum
- Steve's Safari Room
  - The museum was renovated to house the artifacts located in this room.
  - Contains artifacts from Steve's trips to Africa

Dennis &Ruby Anderson donated $100,000 & 1000's hours of labor in memory of Steve for the renovation

== First National Bank Building ==
First National Bank Building
- Interactive map of the First National Bank Building area
- Former names: Commercial Bank Building
- Alternative names: Dawson Bank Museum

General information
- Architectural style: Richardsonion Romanesque
- Location: 759 6th St, Dawson, MN 56232, Dawson, Minnesota, USA
- Completed: 1892

Height
- Top floor: 2

Technical details
- Floor count: 2

=== Overview ===
The First National Bank Building is a two-story building made of brownstone and polished granite. It is built in the Richardsonian Romanesque Style. It is built on a coursed ashlar foundation.

=== Significance ===
The First National Bank Building is significant because of its well-preserved exterior in the Richardson Romanesque Style. It also is associated with Christopher M. Anderson, a pioneer and incorporator of Dawson.

"The construction of the imposing, and architecturally distinctive, Commercial Bank building (later First National Bank) attested to the turn of the century prosperity of Dawson, and to the commitment of Anderson to its stability and future promise."

=== 1930 bank robbery ===
In April 1930, two people robbed the First National Bank. They cashed a $20 bill, and looked around the building before their heist. The next day, they came back to the bank with guns, and robbed the bank. At the time of the robbery, there was a total of eight people in the bank. The robbers made the eight people lay on the floor, and after they took what they wanted from the bank, herded the eight people into the bank's vault, locked the vault's door, and fled. The robbers never returned.

Inside the vault it was lightless and airtight. The eight people inside started rapidly running out of air to breathe. Eventually, a customer came into the bank and heard the screams for help from the trapped people. The bank president gave the customer the vault's combination, but the customer had never opened a bank vault before and didn't know how to do it. So, the customer got the president from another bank in town, and they opened the vault, setting the eight people free.

After the incident, a vent was installed in the vault.

The crime was unsolved until the mid-2010s, when a niece was rummaging through her recently passed away uncle's belongings. The niece found a book titled, "How I Made my Living, I Rob Banks". The uncle didn't write the book, but he was in possession of it. Inside the book was sketches of various banks including Dawson's First National Bank.

The robbery was reenacted in the summer of 2019.

=== Uses of second story ===
It is rumored that the building has held Ku Klux Klan meetings in its second story.

The second story now displays war artifacts including the dress uniform of the 3-war veteran Col. Wayne Moe and the cold weather flight suit of Harris Ronning, a former B-24 belly gunner.

== In media ==
The Dawson Bank Museum was featured on the 11th season and 12th episode of Postcards, a television series by PBS.

== See also ==
- National Register of Historic Places listings in Lac qui Parle County, Minnesota
