= Sheri Swokowski =

American U.S. Army Colonel and transgender activist

Sheri A Swokowski
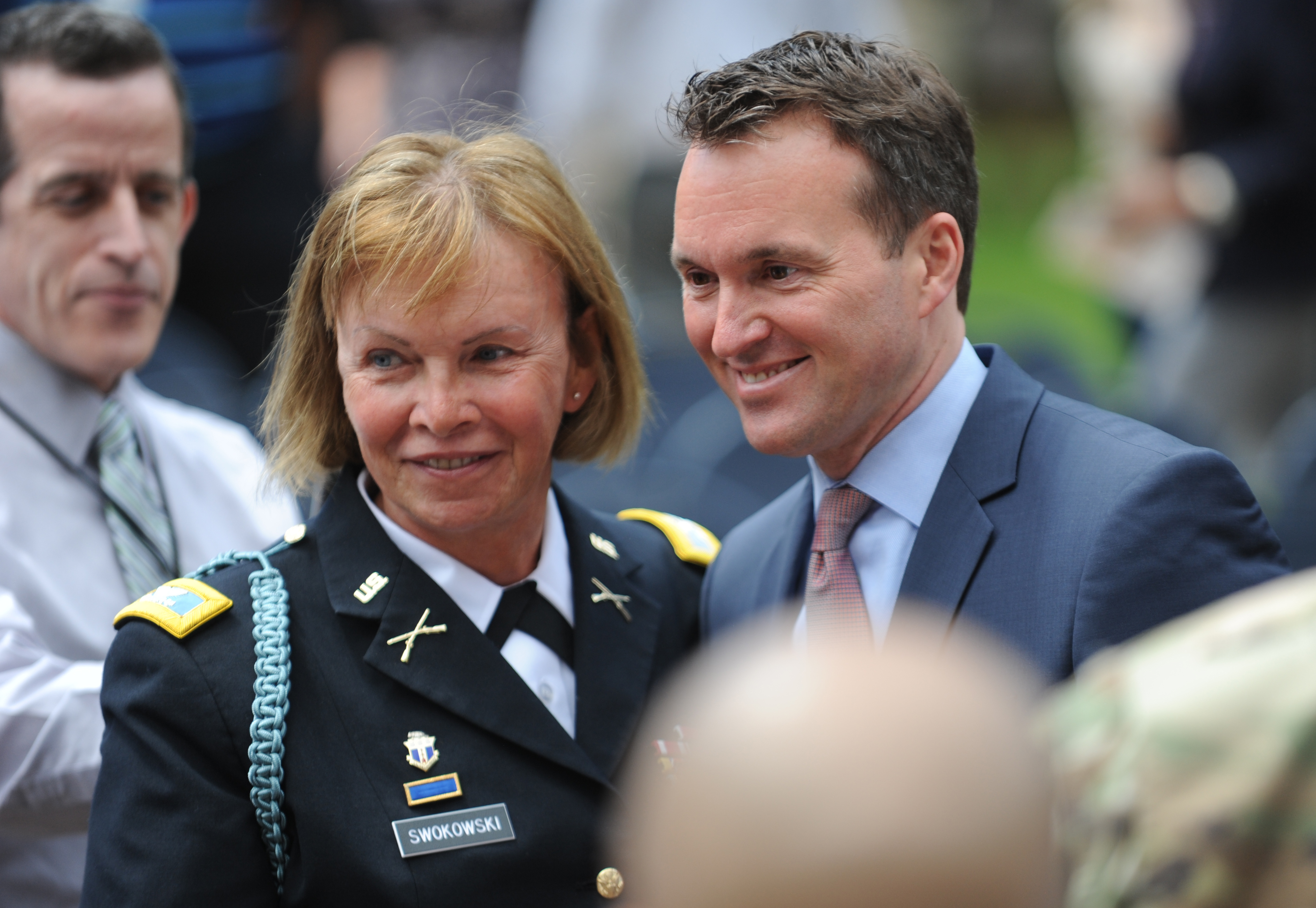
- Swokowski, pictured at the June 8, 2016 LGBT Pride Month Event at the Pentagon with Secretary of the Army Eric Fanning
- Born: 1950 (age 75–76); Manitowoc, Wisconsin, United States
- Occupations: U.S. Army Colonel; Transgender activist

Sheri Swokowski (born 1950) is an American advocate for transgender rights and former U.S. Army colonel.

== Personal life ==
Swokowski was born in Manitowoc, Wisconsin, one of four children of a former Army World War II veteran/POW and a nurse. Swokowski enlisted in the Wisconsin Army National Guard and joined her local sheriff's department as a reserve deputy after graduating from high school.

Swokowski chose the name 'Sheri' as a portmanteau of female pronouns and the self (she, her, and I) with the help of her spouse near the end of her military career.

== Military service and career ==
Swokowski was a career infantry soldier. She advanced through the enlisted ranks and went on to attend the Wisconsin Military Academy at Fort McCoy, after which she accepted an officer's commission; she attained the rank of colonel by the time she retired from the Army in 2004 after 34 years and 10 months of service, of which the last 22 years were spent on active duty. While serving in the Army, Swokowski taught in the ROTC at the University of Wisconsin–Stevens Point and commanded a light infantry company. At the time of her retirement, she was director of manpower and personnel for the Wisconsin Army and Air National Guard.

After retiring from the Army, Swokowski taught at the U.S. Army Force Management School at Fort Belvoir as a contractor starting in 2006. She openly came out as a transgender woman in 2007 while teaching at the Force Management School; following her transition, she was told by the school's director that she had been replaced, though no other teacher took her place for several months.

In June 2008, Swokowski began work at the Pentagon as a civilian Senior Analyst supporting the Assistant Chief of Staff for Installation Management in managing Army installations. Following her work at the Pentagon, Swokowski served as the director of human resources for the Rocky Mountain Region of the United States Forest Service in Denver for three years before retiring to DeForest, Wisconsin in 2013.

== Education and Research ==
Swokowski has worked as an educator in both military and civilian settings. She holds a Master’s Degree in Management and Organizational Behavior from Silver Lake College, and a Doctoral Degree in Leadership for the Application of Learning and Service from Cardinal Stritch University. Her dissertation, Barriers to Care: A Multiple Case Study Examining the Experiences of Transgender Service Members Seeking Gender Reassignment Surgery was published in 2020. She co-authored a 2026 study titled Transgender Service in the U.S. Military: A scoping review published in the International Journal of Transgender Health.

== Advocacy ==
In response to being dismissed from Force Management School, Swokowski became an advocate for transgender rights in the military and LGBT employment non-discrimination laws. She worked with U.S. Congresswoman Tammy Baldwin of Wisconsin to promote the Employment Non-Discrimination Act, and Baldwin shared her story during the House Committee on Education and Labor meeting on September 23, 2009.

Swokowski submitted a request in May 2014 to have her name updated on DD Form 214, the "Certificate of Release or Discharge from Active Duty". The Army Board for Correction of Military Records issued a correction in January 2015, making Swokowski the highest-ranking transgender Army veteran and the first female infantry soldier recognized by the Department of Defense. With the updated record, Swokowski attended Pentagon Pride events in 2015 as a woman while wearing her infantry brass; as women were not yet allowed to enter the infantry, her uniform served as a reminder of the existence of transgender soldiers, and she hoped to use her presence to represent the estimated 15,500 closeted transgender service members. She played a role in influencing the Department of Defense to repeal the original ban on open transgender service, which was announced by Secretary of Defense Ashton Carter on June 30, 2016.
