= DeForest Area School District =

School district in the city of DeForest, Wisconsin

- 530 East Holum Street DeForest, Dane County, Wisconsin, 53532

District information
- Grades: 4K-12
- Schools: 6
- Budget: $41 million

Students and staff
- Students: 3,848

Other information
- Website: https://www.deforest.k12.wi.us/

The DeForest Area School District is a school district based in the city of DeForest, Wisconsin.

The school district covers approximately 100 square miles, and serves the communities of DeForest and Windsor. It has an enrollment of 3,848, and has a 97% graduation rate. The district administers three elementary schools, one intermediate school, one middle school, and one high school.

== Schools ==
=== Secondary ===
- DeForest Area High School (DAHS)
- DeForest Area Middle School
- Harvest Intermediate School

=== Elementary ===
- Eagle Point Elementary School
- Windsor Elementary School
- Yahara Elementary School
- Community-based 4 Year Old Kindergarten
