= J. U. Nettenstrom =

American architect

Joel U. Nettenstrom was an American architect employed as a staff architect in the Bridge and Building Department of the Chicago, Milwaukee, St. Paul and Pacific Railroad. Several of the railroad stations he designed are listed in the National Register of Historic Places (NRHP).

== Works ==
- Chicago, Milwaukee and St. Paul Depot, Morrisonville, Wisconsin
- Chicago, Milwaukee and St. Paul Depot, 418 Depot Street, New Glarus, Wisconsin (1887), NRHP-listed
- Chicago, Milwaukee and St. Paul Depot, 1811 Parmenter Street, Middleton, Wisconsin (1895), NRHP-listed
- Chicago, Milwaukee and St. Paul Depot, Spencer, Iowa (1900)
- Chicago, Milwaukee and St. Paul Depot, South First Street at Park Avenue, Montevideo, Minnesota (1901), NRHP-listed
- Chicago, Milwaukee and St. Paul fruit receiving house, Milwaukee, Wisconsin (1902)
- Chicago, Milwaukee and St. Paul fruit receiving house, Minneapolis, Minnesota (1902)
- Chicago, Milwaukee St. Paul and Pacific Depot, 219 West Fourth Avenue, Menominee, Michigan (1903), NRHP-listed
- Chicago, Milwaukee St. Paul and Pacific Depot, 650 Hattie Street, Marinette, Wisconsin (1903), NRHP-listed
- Chicago, Milwaukee and St. Paul roundhouse, Galewood, Illinois (1904)
- Chicago, Milwaukee and St. Paul roundhouse, Janesville, Wisconsin (1905)
- Chicago, Milwaukee and St. Paul pattern storage building, West Milwaukee, Wisconsin (1905)
- Chicago, Milwaukee and St. Paul car wheel foundry, West Milwaukee, Wisconsin (1906)

== Gallery ==
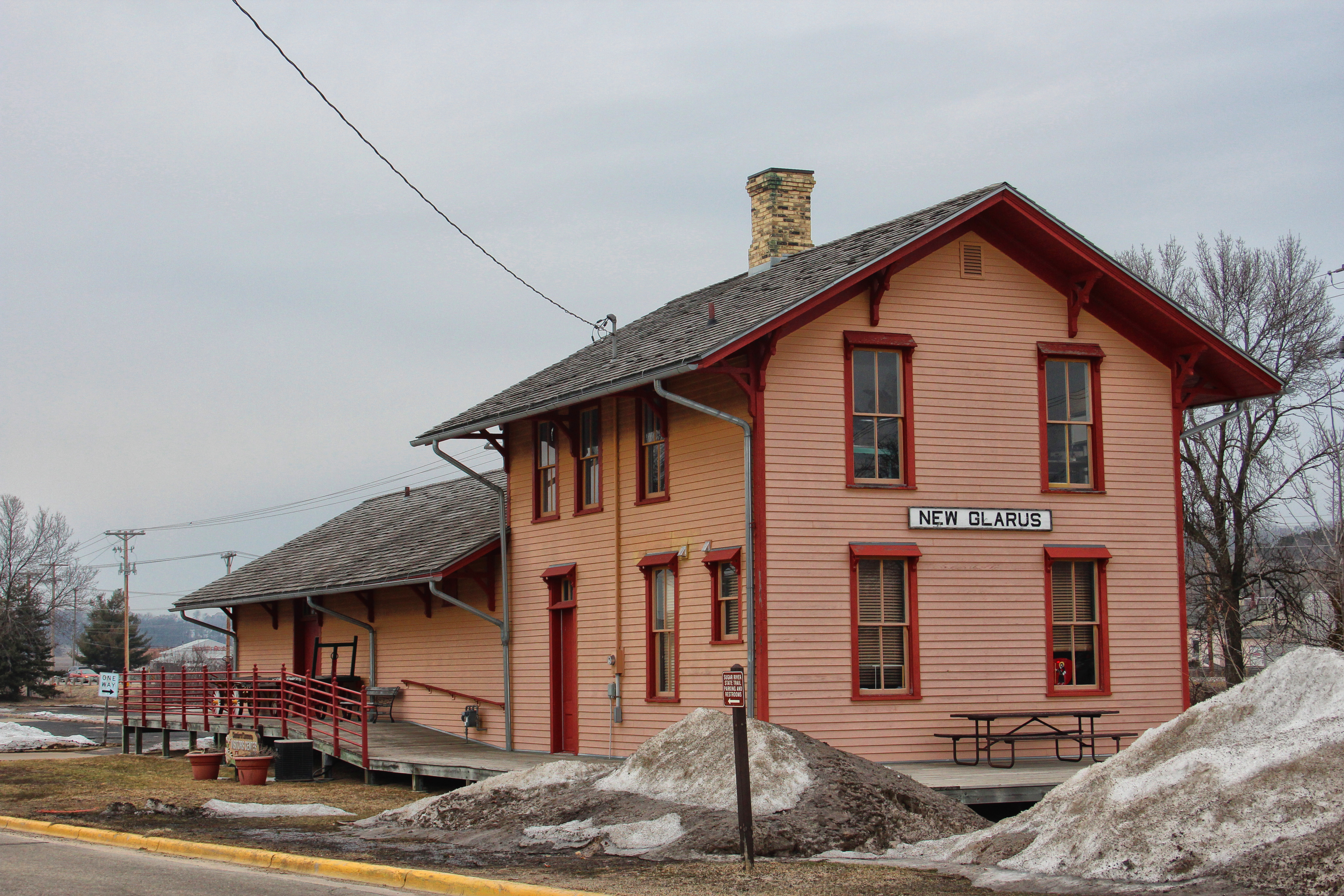
Chicago, Milwaukee, and St. Paul Depot, New Glarus, Wisconsin

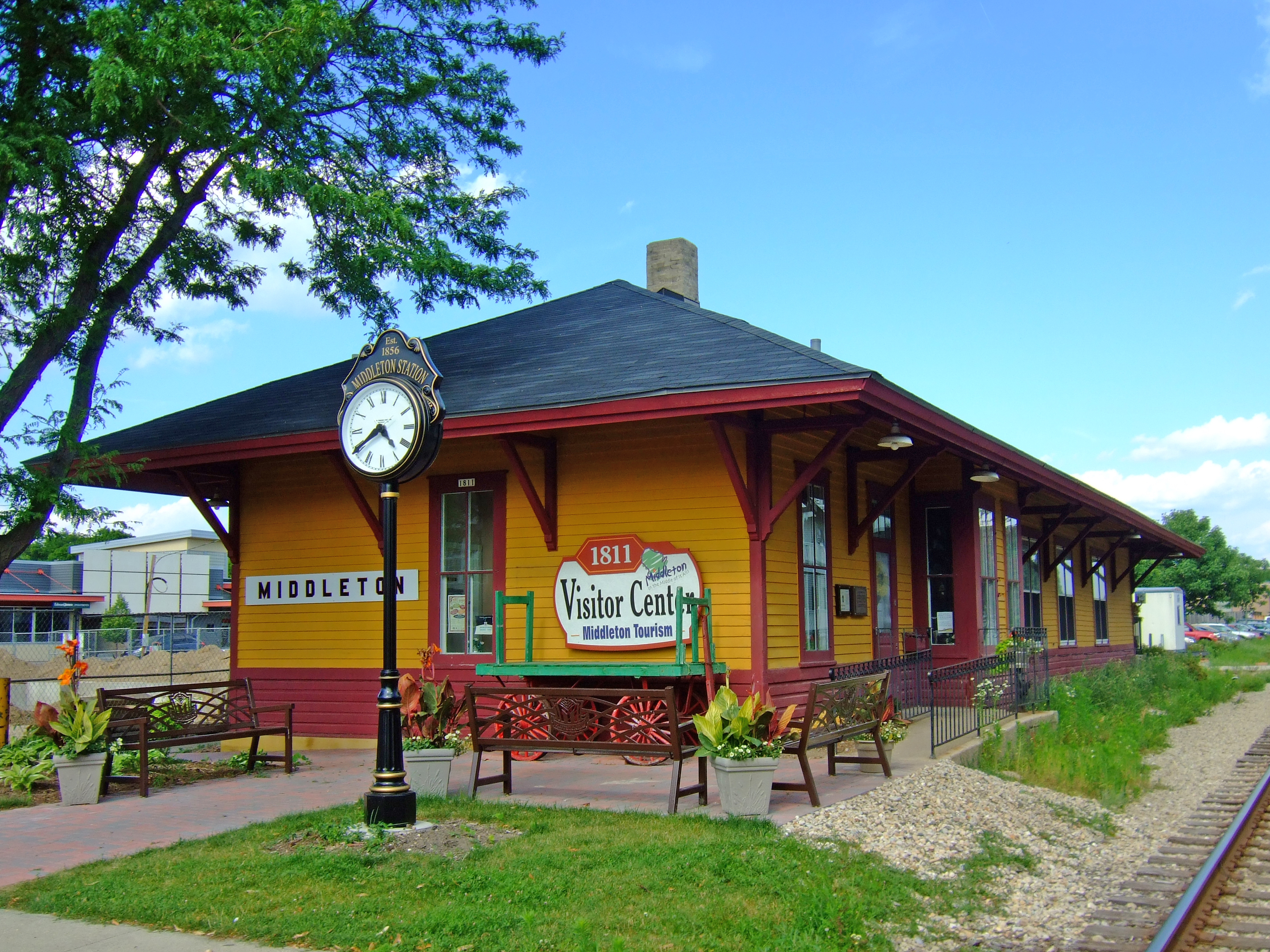
Chicago, Milwaukee, St. Paul & Pacific Depot, Middleton, Wisconsin

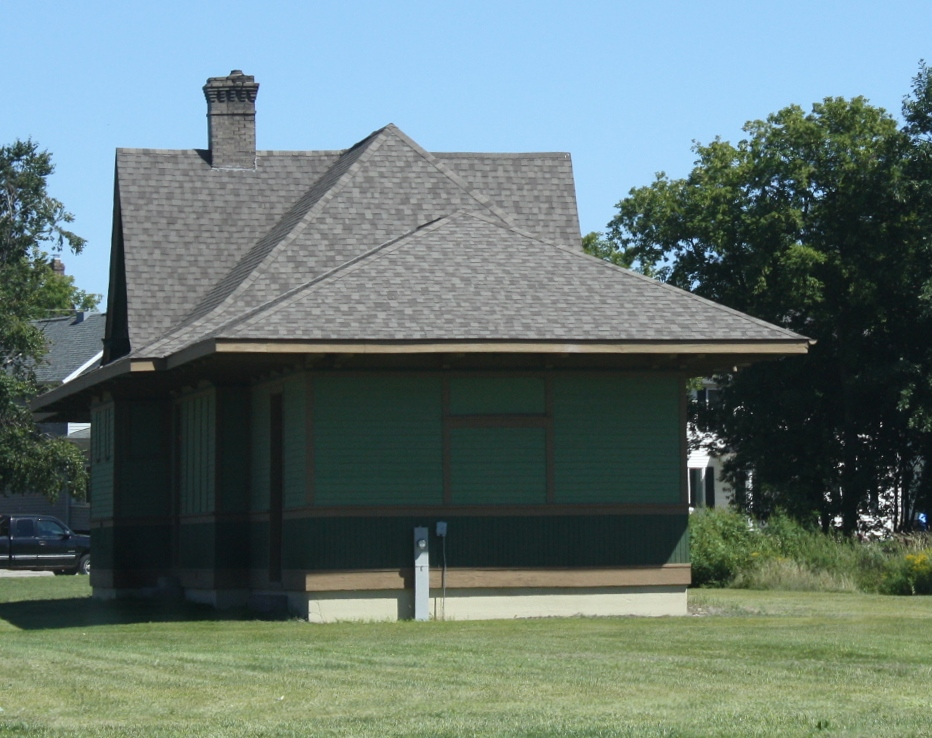
Chicago, Milwaukee, St. Paul and Pacific Railroad Station, Menominee, Michigan

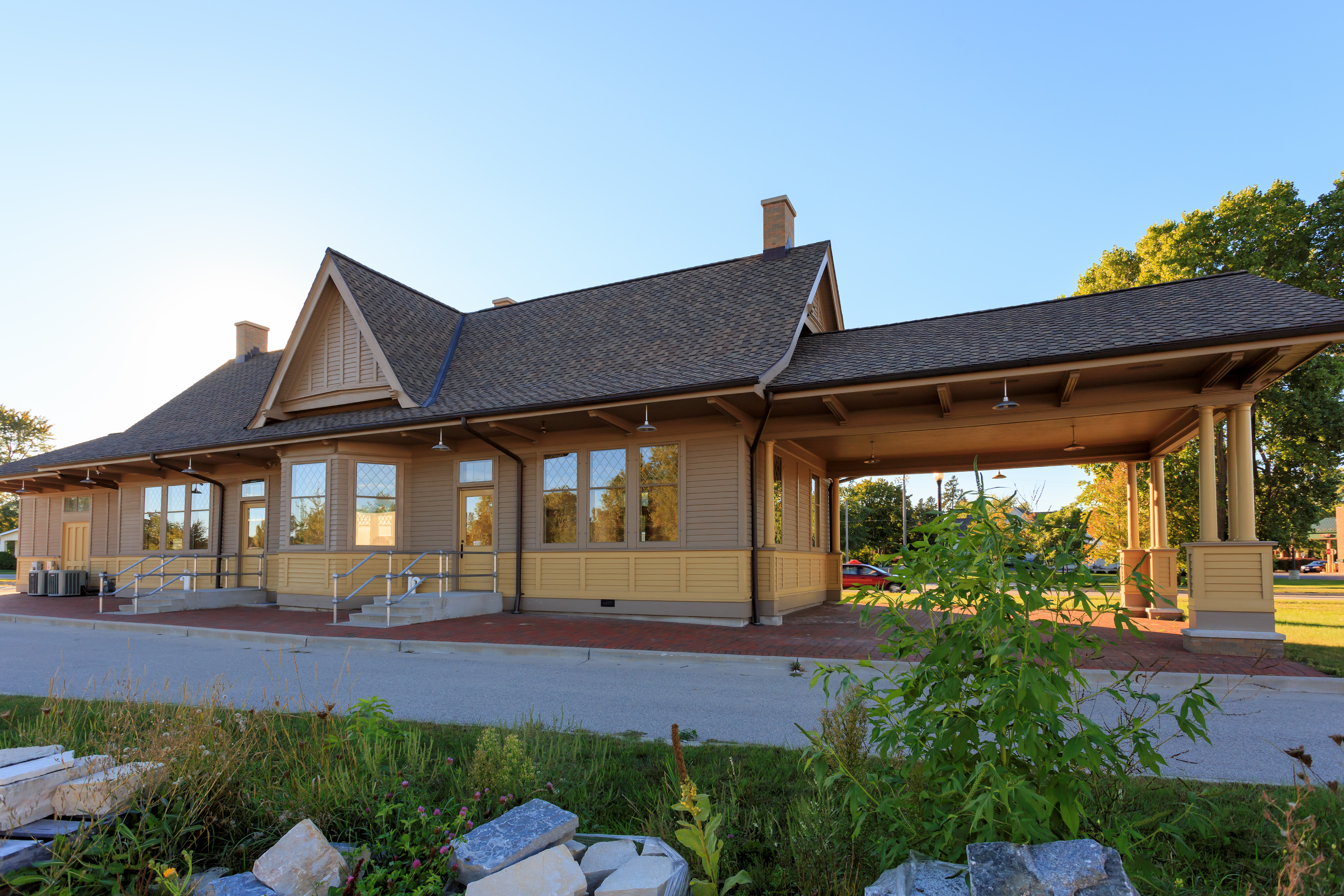
Milwaukee Road Depot, Marinette, Wisconsin

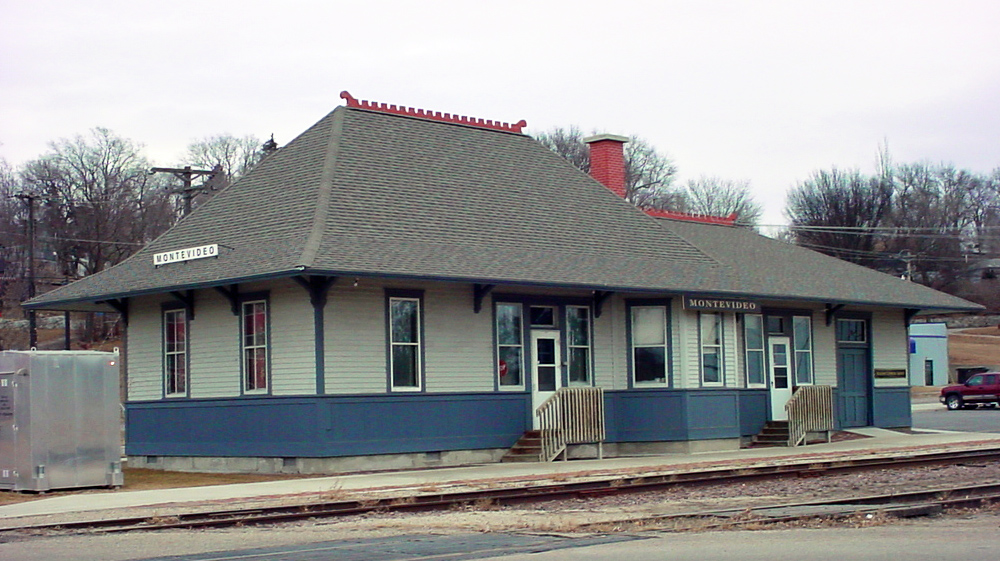
Milwaukee Road Depot, Montevideo, Minnesota
