= Windsor, Wisconsin =

- Village
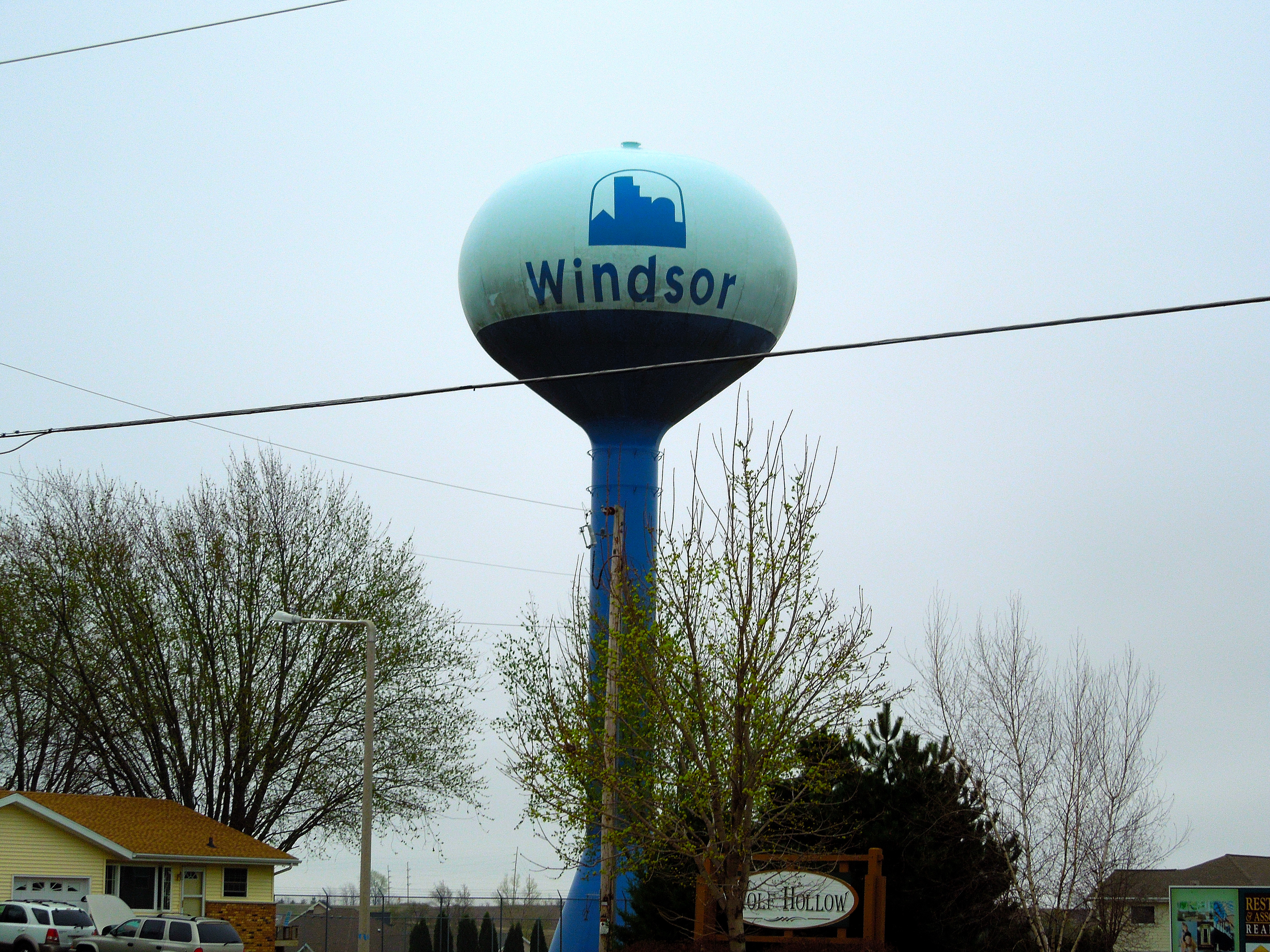
- Windsor water tower
- Interactive map of Windsor, Wisconsin
- Location within Wisconsin
- Coordinates: 43.2457°N 89.2815°W
- Country: United States
- State: Wisconsin
- County: Dane
- Incorporated: November 3, 2015

Government
  - Type: Mayor–council
  - President: Bob Wipperfurth
  - Trustees: Bruce Stravinski; Monica Smith; Ed Wall; Jessica Zander

Area
  - Total: 27.624 sq mi (71.546 km^{2})
  - Land: 27.515 sq mi (71.263 km^{2})
  - Water: 0.109 sq mi (0.283 km^{2}) 0.39%
- Elevation: 1,033 ft (315 m)

Population (2020)
  - Total: 8,754
  - Estimate (2025): 10,085
  - Density: 318.2/sq mi (122.8/km^{2})
- Time zone: UTC–6 (Central (CST))
  - Summer (DST): UTC–5 (CDT)
- ZIP Code: 53598
- Area codes: 608 and 353
- FIPS code: 55-87725
- GNIS feature ID: 2777646
- Website: windsorwi.gov

Windsor is a village in Dane County, Wisconsin, United States. The population was 8,754 as of the 2020 census, and was estimated at by the Wisconsin DOA as 10,727 in 2026. The unincorporated communities of Lake Windsor, Morrisonville, and Token Creek are located within the village.

It is part of the Madison metropolitan area.

== History ==
While visited in the late 1830s, the first settler to the town was William Lawrence, who came from the state of Vermont in 1841. He later served in the Civil War. James Morrison settled in the town in 1843 at what is now Morrisonville. Windsor voted to incorporate as a village on November 3, 2015; prior to its incorporation, it was a town, and a portion of the town was a census-designated place.

== Geography ==
According to the United States Census Bureau, the village has an area of 27.624 square miles (71.55 km^{2}), of which 27.515 square miles (71.26 km^{2}) is land and 0.109 square miles (0.28 km^{2}) (0.39%) is water.

A portion of the former town was part of a disputed annexation by the Village of DeForest. In July 2004, the village and town reached a settlement in which part of the disputed area would be annexed by the village and part would remain with the town. In addition, the town and village agreed to exchange other, less populated land.

== Demographics ==
Historical population
Census	Pop.	Note	%±
1990	2,182		—
2000	2,533		16.1%
2010	3,573		41.1%
2020	8,754		145.0%
2025 (est.)	10,085		15.2%
U.S. Decennial Census; 2020 Census

According to realtor website Zillow, the average price of a home as of July 31, 2026, in Windsor was $525,995.

As of the 2024 American Community Survey, there were 3,480 estimated households in Windsor with an average of 2.71 persons per household. The village has a median household income of $120,048. Approximately 4.5% of the village's population lives at or below the poverty line. Windsor has an estimated 74.5% employment rate, with 43.5% of the population holding a bachelor's degree or higher and 95.2% holding a high school diploma. There were 3,655 housing units at an average density of 132.84 per square mile (51.29/km^{2}).

The top five reported languages (people were allowed to report up to two languages, thus the figures will generally add to more than 100%) were English (96.9%), Spanish (0.8%), Indo-European (1.7%), Asian and Pacific Islander (0.6%), and Other (0.1%).

The median age in the village was 38.3 years.

Windsor, Wisconsin – racial and ethnic composition Note: the US Census treats Hispanic/Latino as an ethnic category. This table excludes Latinos from the racial categories and assigns them to a separate category. Hispanics/Latinos may be of any race.
Race / ethnicity (NH = non-Hispanic)	Pop 1990	Pop 2000	Pop 2010	Pop 2020	% 1990	% 2000	% 2010	% 2020
White alone (NH)	2,134	2,419	3,308	7,646	97.80%	95.50%	92.58%	87.34%
Black or African American alone (NH)	11	13	61	177	0.50%	0.51%	1.71%	2.02%
Native American or Alaska Native alone (NH)	9	9	4	15	0.41%	0.36%	0.11%	0.17%
Asian alone (NH)	3	30	71	215	0.14%	1.18%	1.99%	2.46%
Pacific Islander alone (NH)	—	0	2	4	—	0.00%	0.06%	0.05%
Other race alone (NH)	0	0	2	28	0.00%	0.00%	0.06%	0.32%
Mixed race or multiracial (NH)	—	25	42	311	—	0.99%	1.18%	3.55%
Hispanic or Latino (any race)	25	37	83	358	1.15%	1.46%	2.32%	4.09%
Total	2,182	2,533	3,573	8,754	100.00%	100.00%	100.00%	100.00%

=== 2020 census ===
As of the 2020 census, there were 8,754 people, 3,241 households, and 2,429 families residing in the village. The population density was 317.59 inhabitants per square mile (122.62/km^{2}). There were 3,345 housing units at an average density of 121.35 per square mile (46.85/km^{2}). The racial makeup of the village was 88.38% White, 2.12% African American, 0.24% Native American, 2.46% Asian, 0.07% Pacific Islander, 1.56% from some other races and 5.16% from two or more races. Hispanic or Latino people of any race were 4.09% of the population.

=== 2010 census ===
As of the 2010 census, there were 3,573 people, 1,451 households, and 1,005 families residing in the CDP. The population density was 1,149.61 inhabitants per square mile (443.87/km^{2}). There were 1,538 housing units at an average density of 494.85 per square mile (191.06/km^{2}). The racial makeup of the CDP was 93.81% White, 1.74% African American, 0.20% Native American, 1.99% Asian, 0.06% Pacific Islander, 0.84% from some other races and 1.37% from two or more races. Hispanic or Latino people of any race were 2.32% of the population.

=== 2000 census ===
As of the 2000 census, there were 2,533 people, 945 households, and 746 families residing in the CDP. The population density was 800.22 inhabitants per square mile (308.97/km^{2}). There were 978 housing units at an average density of 308.97 per square mile (119.29/km^{2}). The racial makeup of the CDP was 96.13% White, 0.51% African American, 0.36% Native American, 1.18% Asian, 0.00% Pacific Islander, 0.59% from some other races and 1.22% from two or more races. Hispanic or Latino people of any race were 1.46% of the population.

There were 945 households, out of which 38.0% had children under the age of 18 living with them, 67.0% were married couples living together, 8.5% had a female householder with no husband present, and 21.0% were non-families. 13.9% of all households were made up of individuals, and 3.0% had someone living alone who was 65 years of age or older. The average household size was 2.67 and the average family size was 2.95.

The CDP age distribution was 27.0% under the age of 18, 6.8% from 18 to 24, 32.3% from 25 to 44, 27.0% from 45 to 64, and 6.8% who were 65 years of age or older. The median age was 36 years. For every 100 females, there were 98.8 males. For every 100 females age 18 and over, there were 100.0 males.

The median income for a household in the CDP was $61,958, and the median income for a family was $69,150. Males had a median income of $41,232 versus $27,863 for females. The per capita income for the CDP was $31,529. None of the families and 1.0% of the population were living below the poverty line, including no under eighteens and none of those over 64.

== Education ==
There are two public schools in Windsor. Windsor Elementary School serves grades K-4. Harvest Intermediate School serves grades 5 and 6. Windsor is served by DeForest Area School District, which operates several additional schools in nearby DeForest.

== Notable residents ==
- Clara Bewick Colby, writer
- Michael Johnson, state representative
- Clement Warner, farmer, colonel in the 36th Wisconsin Infantry Regiment and later a state legislator
