= Love Thy Neighbor (book) =

2019 memoir by Ayaz Virji and Alan Eisenstock

Love Thy Neighbor: A Muslim Doctor's Struggle for Home in Rural America
- Author: Ayaz Virji with Alan Eisenstock
- Language: English
- Genre: Memoir
- Publisher: Penguin Random House
- Publication date: June 11, 2019
- Pages: 208
- ISBN: 9780525577201

Love Thy Neighbor: A Muslim Doctor's Struggle for Home in Rural America is a 2019 book by Ayaz Virji with Alan Eisenstock.

== Plot summary ==
In 2013, Dr. Ayaz Virji moves his family from Harrisburg, Pennsylvania to Dawson, Minnesota, leaving his job at a large hospital to practice at a small, rural one. Virji wanted to address rural healthcare inequality and work in an environment in which he could get to know his patients.

The Virjis felt at-home in the Dawson community, despite the fact that they were the only Muslims in town, until the 2016 presidential election. Most Dawson residents had voted for Donald Trump, despite his many anti-Muslim stances.

Spurred on by Mandy France, then an intern at a local Lutheran church and later a pastor, Virji began sharing his experiences as a Muslim person to local Christian audiences to work to dismiss myths about Islam and Muslims. The first talk was titled "Love Thy Neighbor" and was hosted in a school auditorium. The talks received mixed reviews from residents, but Virji went on to give more than 25 lectures, including addressing the Evangelical Lutheran Church in America's national celebration of the 500th anniversary of the Protestant Reformation in 2017.

The book jumps between tellings of Virji's lectures throughout Minnesota and his and his family's experiences with Islamophobia following the 9/11 attacks and the 2016 election.

== Commendation ==
Publishers Weekly named the book one of the best books of the year in 2019.
