= Lac qui Parle, Minnesota =

Unincorporated community in Minnesota, United States

- Unincorporated community
- Location within Minnesota Location within the United States
- Coordinates: 45°00′02″N 95°54′22″W
- Country: United States
- State: Minnesota
- County: Lac qui Parle
- Township: Lac qui Parle
- Elevation: 1,020 ft (310 m)
- Time zone: UTC-6 (Central (CST))
  - Summer (DST): UTC-5 (CDT)
- Area code: 320
- GNIS feature ID: 646298

Lac qui Parle (/ˌlæk kiː ˈpɑːrl/ LAK kee PARL) is an unincorporated community in Lac qui Parle Township, Lac qui Parle County, Minnesota, United States. Lac qui Parle Village is the county's first permanently settled community, starting in 1868.

During the Dakota war of 1862, the community was vacated.

Lac qui Parle village was the original county seat for Lac qui Parle County. The county board met in the hotel and post office building from 1871 to 1875, then in a rented space in the local general store until 1883 when a new courthouse was built. The courthouse was later moved to Madison, in 1889, after a county election chose Madison as the new seat. In 1899, ten years later, a new courthouse was built in Madison which is now on the United States National Register of Historic Places.

Historical population
Census	Pop.	Note	%±
1880	108		—
U.S. Decennial Census
