= DeForest, Wisconsin =

- Village
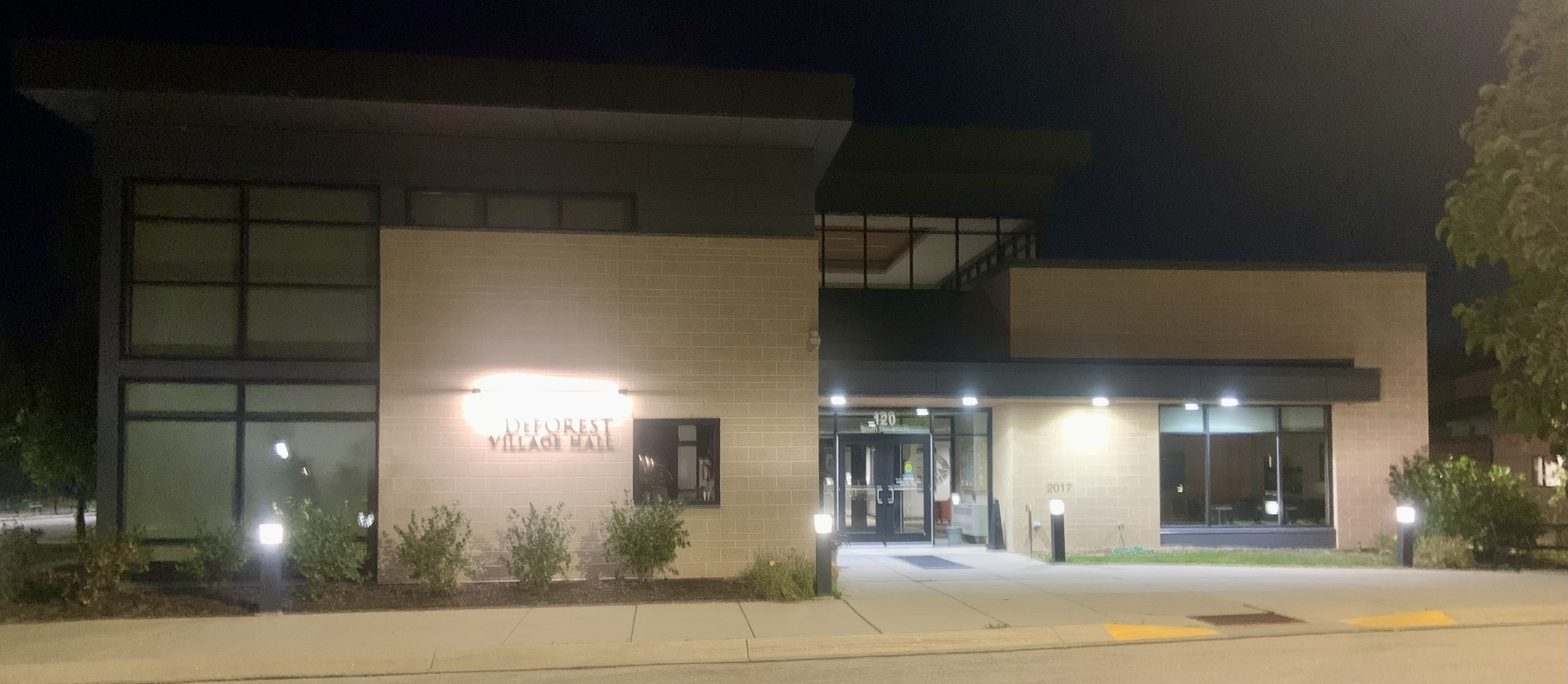
- Village hall
- Interactive map of DeForest, Wisconsin
- Location within Wisconsin Location within the United States
- Coordinates: 43°14′45″N 89°20′45″W
- Country: United States
- State: Wisconsin
- County: Dane

Government
  - Municipal Judge: Jason Hanson

Area
  - Total: 8.57 sq mi (22.20 km^{2})
  - Land: 8.50 sq mi (22.01 km^{2})
  - Water: 0.073 sq mi (0.19 km^{2})
- Elevation: 948 ft (289 m)

Population (2020)
  - Total: 10,811
  - Estimate (2025): 13,094
  - Density: 1,343.0/sq mi (518.53/km^{2})
- Time zone: UTC-6 (Central (CST))
  - Summer (DST): UTC-5 (CDT)
- Postal code: 53532
- Area code: 608 353
- FIPS code: 55-19350
- GNIS feature ID: 1563756
- Website: www.deforestwi.gov

DeForest (/dəˈfɔːrɪst/ də-FOR-ist) is a village in Dane County, Wisconsin, United States, along the Yahara River. The population was 10,811 at the 2020 census. A suburb north of Madison, it is part of the Madison metropolitan area.

== History ==
Before European settlement, the area now known as DeForest was home to Native American peoples, notably the Ho-Chunk Nation. The Wisconsin River valley and its tributaries provided vital resources and travel routes for these early inhabitants.

DeForest traces its origins to 1854 when Isaac DeForest, a Belgian-American settler, arrived in the area and acquired extensive land holdings primarily for wheat farming. Recognizing the potential for community development, he platted the land in 1856, laying the foundation for the village that would bear his name. Despite initial success, the post-Civil war decline in wheat prices led DeForest to sell his land in 1868 and relocate to Kansas; however, the village retained his name and continued to grow.

Its name was long spelled "De Forest," but has since been changed to "DeForest."

The arrival of the Chicago and North Western Railway in the late 19th century significantly impacted DeForest's growth. The railway provided essential connections for transporting agricultural products, particularly grains and dairy, to broader markets. DeForest was officially incorporated as a village in 1897. The early 20th century saw steady growth, with agriculture, small-scale manufacturing, and local trade forming the backbone of the economy.

Following World War II, DeForest experienced suburban expansion due to its proximity to Madison and improved transportation infrastructure. The development of highways, including the nearby Interstate 90/94 corridor, facilitated commuter access and contributed to residential growth. Today, DeForest blends its rural heritage with a growing suburban identity. The village has invested in revitalizing its downtown, expanding parks and trails, and supporting educational initiatives through the DeForest Area School District. While maintaining a strong sense of community, DeForest continues to evolve as part of the Greater Madison metropolitan area.

== Geography ==
DeForest is located at 43°14′45″N 89°20′45″W (43.245751, −89.345869). DeForest is located in northern Dane County approximately 15 miles (24 km) northeast of downtown Madison, the state capital, and is considered part of the Madison metropolitan area.

According to the United States Census Bureau, the village has a total area of 8.57 square miles (22.20 km^{2}), of which 8.47 square miles (21.94 km^{2}) is land and 0.10 square miles (0.26 km^{2}) is water.

The village is situated along the Yahara River. DeForest lies within a landscape characterized by glacial moraines, rolling plains, and fertile agricultural fields. The region is part of the Driftless Area boundary zone, although DeForest itself was glaciated during the last Ice Age. The resulting terrain supports a mixture of suburban development, farmland, and restored prairie. DeForest's elevation averages around 951 feet (290 meters) above sea level, and the village experiences a humid continental climate (Köppen Dfa), characterized by warm summers, cold winters, and moderate precipitation year-round (NOAA).

== Demographics ==
Historical population
Census	Pop.	Note	%±
1910	431		—
1920	493		14.4%
1930	540		9.5%
1940	598		10.7%
1950	805		34.6%
1960	1,223		51.9%
1970	1,911		56.3%
1980	3,367		76.2%
1990	4,882		45.0%
2000	7,368		50.9%
2010	8,936		21.3%
2020	10,811		21.0%
2025 (est.)	13,094		21.1%
U.S. Decennial Census

=== Racial and ethnic composition ===
Historical demographic data for DeForest, WI (2000–2020)
Characteristic		2020 Census	2010 Census	2000 Census
Total Population		10,811	8,936	7,368
Race (Alone) (Hispanic included in racial counts)	White	81.5%	93.3%	95.3%
Race (Alone) (Hispanic included in racial counts)	Black or African American	2.0%	2.1%	1.5%
Race (Alone) (Hispanic included in racial counts)	Asian	2.0%	1.5%	0.7%
Race (Alone) (Hispanic included in racial counts)	American Indian/Alaska Native	< 0.1%	0.3%	0.3%
Race (Alone) (Hispanic included in racial counts)	Native Hawaiian/Pacific Islander	< 0.1%	0.0%	0.1%
Race (Alone) (Hispanic included in racial counts)	Some Other Race	0.3%	1.2%	0.6%
Race (Alone) (Hispanic included in racial counts)	Two or More Races	14.2%	1.6%	1.4%
Race (Alone) (Hispanic included in racial counts)	Hispanic or Latino (Ethnicity) (of any race)	9.4%	3.6%	2.2%

=== 2020 census ===
As of the 2020 census, DeForest had a population of 10,811. The median age was 37.8 years. 25.9% of residents were under the age of 18 and 13.1% of residents were 65 years of age or older. For every 100 females there were 93.2 males, and for every 100 females age 18 and over there were 90.1 males age 18 and over.

The population density was 1,343 inhabitants per square mile (518.5/km²). The village encompassed a total area of 8.57 square miles, of which 8.50 square miles was land.

99.0% of residents lived in urban areas, while 1.0% lived in rural areas.

There were 4,163 households in DeForest, of which 36.7% had children under the age of 18 living in them. Of all households, 54.4% were married-couple households, 14.2% were households with a male householder and no spouse or partner present, and 23.5% were households with a female householder and no spouse or partner present. About 23.8% of all households were made up of individuals and 8.7% had someone living alone who was 65 years of age or older.

There were 4,294 housing units, of which 3.1% were vacant. The homeowner vacancy rate was 0.5% and the rental vacancy rate was 4.1%.

=== 2010 census ===
As of the census of 2010, there were 8,936 people, 3,400 households, and 2,446 families living in the village. The population density was 1,202.7 inhabitants per square mile (464.4/km^{2}). There were 3,499 housing units at an average density of 470.9 per square mile (181.8/km^{2}). The racial makeup of the village was 93.3% White, 2.1% African American, 0.3% Native American, 1.5% Asian, 1.2% from other races, and 1.6% from two or more races. Hispanic or Latino people of any race were 3.6% of the population.

There were 3,400 households, of which 41.7% had children under the age of 18 living with them, 56.1% were married couples living together, 11.0% had a female householder with no husband present, 4.8% had a male householder with no wife present, and 28.1% were non-families. 21.6% of all households were made up of individuals, and 7.7% had someone living alone who was 65 years of age or older. The average household size was 2.63 and the average family size was 3.08.

The median age in the village was 35.6 years. 29% of residents were under the age of 18; 6.3% were between the ages of 18 and 24; 31% were from 25 to 44; 25% were from 45 to 64; and 8.7% were 65 years of age or older. The gender makeup of the village was 48.4% male and 51.6% female.

=== 2000 census ===
As of the census of 2000, there were 7,368 people, 2,675 households, and 2,000 families living in the village. The population density was 1,525.3 people per square mile (589.0/km^{2}). There were 2,761 housing units at an average density of 571.6 per square mile (220.7/km^{2}). The racial makeup of the village was 95.34% White, 1.48% African American, 0.34% Native American, 0.68% Asian, 0.14% Pacific Islander, 0.62% from other races, and 1.40% from two or more races. Hispanic or Latino people of any race were 2.19% of the population.

There were 2,675 households, out of which 44.9% had children under the age of 18 living with them, 61.4% were married couples living together, 9.8% had a female householder with no husband present, and 25.2% were non-families. 19.3% of all households were made up of individuals, and 7.2% had someone living alone who was 65 years of age or older. The average household size was 2.74 and the average family size was 3.15.

In the village, the population was spread out, with 31.1% under the age of 18, 6.3% from 18 to 24, 36.2% from 25 to 44, 18.3% from 45 to 64, and 8.1% who were 65 years of age or older. The median age was 33 years. For every 100 females, there were 92.8 males. For every 100 females age 18 and over, there were 92.0 males.

The median income for a household in the village was $55,369, and the median income for a family was $60,781. Males had a median income of $40,096 versus $28,000 for females. The per capita income for the village was $21,089. About 1.7% of families and 3.6% of the population were below the poverty line, including 2.7% of those under age 18 and 9.7% of those age 65 or over.

== Education ==
The DeForest Area School District schools include three elementary schools, one intermediate school, one middle school and DeForest Area High School

DeForest Area Public Library serves the DeForest area, including the villages of Windsor and DeForest, and the town of Vienna. It is a member of the South Central Library System. As of 2009, the library served a population of 17,142, with a collection of over 81,000 items, including books, serials, audios, videos and kits. Circulation topped 405,000 with 200,000 library visits, and 21,000 users of public computers. The library building, completed in 2002, was modeled after the medieval Stavekirke to highlight the Norwegian heritage of the area. A Wisconsin artist designed the dragons that adorn the roof.

== Economy and infrastructure ==
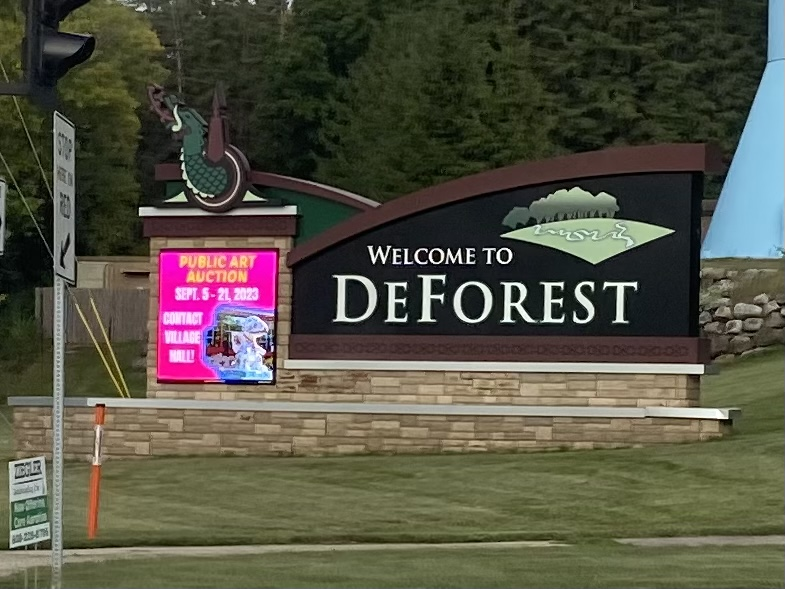
DeForest welcome sign

=== Major Employers ===
Walgreens Distribution Center – A major logistics hub serving the regional supply chain.

EVCO Plastics – Global headquarters in DeForest; specializes in medical and industrial plastic injection molding, with an ISO‑certified cleanroom facility.

ABS Global, Inc. – International livestock genetics company headquartered in DeForest.

Other notable local employers include American Packaging Corporation, Ball Metalpack, American Girl (Mattel distribution), Clack Corporation, Demco, Inc., and The Little Potato Company

=== Headquartered Businesses ===
These businesses are officially based in DeForest:

ABS Global, Inc. – Provides frozen bovine semen and related services.

EVCO Plastics – Operates its MED (Medical and Electronic Devices) division from its headquarters on EVCO Circle.

American Packaging Corporation, Ball Metalpack, UAS Labs, Orbis, The Little Potato Company – All have local bases of operation in DeForest.

=== Local Industries ===
==== Manufacturing ====
Strong presence in plastics, packaging, and consumer goods; 125+ acres of Foreign Trade Zone in the business park streamlined for manufacturing efficiency.

==== Food and Beverage Processing ====
Supported by Madison region's large food cluster and local producers such as The Little Potato Company.

==== Distribution and Logistics ====
Prime location at I‑39/90/94, US‑51 and rail access; suited for regional logistics operations.

==== Bioscience and ICT Services ====
Proximity to UW‑Madison talent fuels advanced business and tech service firms.

==== Retail ====
Commercial areas along highway corridors and downtown support local service and shopping activities.

==== Commercial Development ====
DeForest Business Park is a certified "shovel‑ready" site spanning roughly 115 acres, including 57 contiguous certified development acres adjacent to US‑51 and I‑39/90/94, with rail access and industrial zoning.

American Packaging Corp. invested ~$50 million in a 170,000 ft^{2} facility in 2017, expanding further in 2019 by another 126,000 ft^{2} to include advanced automation and rotogravure presses.

=== Infrastructure ===
==== Transportation ====
DeForest is double bypassed by I-39/90/94 to the west, with an exit at CTH-V (this area features most of the city's hotels and restaurants). US-51 also has an exit located at CTH-V, on the city's east side.

A single rail train track runs north-south through DeForest. This is only used by freight trains; no passenger rail serves DeForest.

DeForest is about 15 miles to Dane County Regional Airport in Madison, which provides both commercial and general aviation flights.

==== Utilities & Broadband ====
Existing high‑capacity power and fiber optics are readily available to support industrial and tech operations; municipal development processes are expedited.

==== Trade Zone Benefits ====
Over 125 acres designated as a Foreign Trade Zone, allowing businesses to defer tariffs on imported inventory until sale, improving cash flow.

=== Employment and Labor ===
DeForest is part of Dane County, where manufacturing and healthcare jobs have seen growth across the region; Wisconsin remains first in manufacturing jobs per government job, though labor supply growth is constrained by demographic shifts.

The village draws on the skilled labor pool of the Madison metro area and benefits from proximity to UW‑Madison and technical colleges.

=== Projects and Investments ===
==== Facility expansions ====
American Packaging's major developments mentioned above have boosted local job creation, adding hundreds of new roles wedc.org.

==== Certified site designation ====
Has made the Business Park more attractive to developers and firms, resulting in landing tenants like Merck Animal Products, Big Joe Forklifts, and proposed headquarters like Lake City Glass.

== Events ==
Fluoride Removed from Water Supply: In 2025, the Village of Deforest board members voted on a resolution to discontinue fluoride addition to the water supply. This resolution passed. In 2007, the village of Deforest water utility acquired the Token Creek Water district. The well supplying water to that area never had fluoride added, and lacked the equipment to do so.

== Notable people ==
Andrea Anders – actress

Sean Anders – film director and screenwriter

Maureen McCarville – member of the Wisconsin State Assembly and Dane County Board of Supervisors

Edward C. Meland – educator, newspaper editor, and member of the Wisconsin State Assembly

Clarence H. Carter – former member of the Wisconsin State Assembly

Sheri Swokowski – retired U.S. Army colonel and transgender rights advocate

Philip Nelson – professional football quarterback
