= Montevideo station =

Railway station in Montevideo, Minnesota, United States

Montevideo
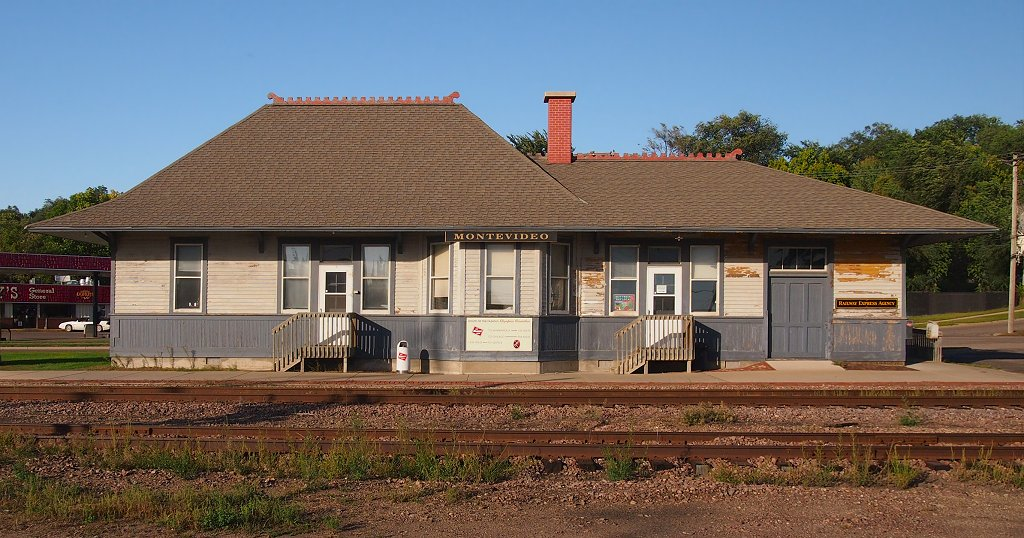
- The Montevideo Milwaukee Road Depot from the southwest

General information
- Location: 301 State Road, Montevideo, Minnesota 56265
- System: Former Milwaukee Road passenger rail station

History
- Closed: 1969
- Rebuilt: 1901

Services
Preceding station	Milwaukee Road	Following station
Watson toward Seattle or Tacoma	Main Line	Wegdahl toward Chicago
- Chicago, Milwaukee and St. Paul Depot
- U.S. National Register of Historic Places
- Location within Minnesota Location within the United States
- Location: S. First St. at Park Ave., Montevideo, Minnesota
- Coordinates: 44°56′30″N 95°43′20″W
- Area: less than one acre
- Built: 1901
- Architects: Chicago, Milwaukee, & St. Paul RR; J. U. Nettenstrom
- NRHP reference No.: 88002079
- Added to NRHP: October 27, 1988
Location

The Chicago, Milwaukee and St. Paul Railroad Depot is a former Chicago, Milwaukee and St. Paul Railroad (the Milwaukee Road) depot in Montevideo, Minnesota, United States. It is now listed on the National Register of Historic Places. The station was built in 1901 and is the only remaining building in Montevideo that was built by the railroad. The Milwaukee Road ceased passenger service to Montevideo in 1969.

The depot is now the Milwaukee Road Heritage Center, a railroad museum that focuses on interpreting the history of the Milwaukee Road as it influenced Montevideo in the late 19th century through the 1980s. The Milwaukee Road Heritage Center also displays donated railroad equipment, such as a 200-ton crane, passenger and baggage cars, freight cars, a Plymouth Locomotive Works 44-ton switching locomotive, and a 600 horsepower (450 kW) diesel switcher built by Electro-Motive Division in 1939. The group has also restored a turntable that provides access to a 26-stall roundhouse.

== See also ==
- List of United States railroads
  - List of Minnesota railroads
- List of heritage railroads in the United States
- List of railway museums
