= Clarence H. Carter (Wisconsin politician) =

American politician

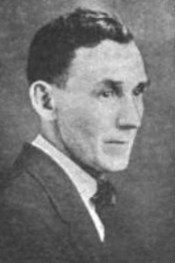

Member of the Wisconsin State Assembly
- In office 1917–1919

Personal details
- Born: May 19, 1874 Vernon County, Wisconsin, US
- Died: May 7, 1958 (aged 83) Madison, Wisconsin, US
- Party: Republican
- Occupation: Businessman, politician

Clarence H. Carter (May 19, 1874 – May 7, 1958) was a member of the Wisconsin State Assembly.

== Biography ==
Carter was born in Vernon County, Wisconsin. He went to the public schools and to high school. Carter was in the insurance and tobacco buying business. Carter was first elected to the Assembly in 1916. Other positions he held include Chairman of the Vernon County Board of Supervisors. He was a Republican. In 1946, Carter moved to DeForest, Wisconsin from Readstown. Carter died in a hospital in Madison, Wisconsin on May 7, 1958. He was buried in Readstown Cemetery.
