= Dawson, Minnesota =

City in Minnesota, United States

Dawson
- City
- Nicknames: Gnometown USA, Dodge
- Motto: "The Small City With The Bright Future"
- Location of Dawson, Minnesota
- Coordinates: 44°55′44″N 96°03′01″W
- Country: United States
- State: Minnesota
- County: Lac qui Parle
- Named for: William Dawson

Area
  - Total: 1.44 sq mi (3.72 km^{2})
  - Land: 1.44 sq mi (3.72 km^{2})
  - Water: 0 sq mi (0.00 km^{2})
- Elevation: 1,040 ft (320 m)

Population (2020)
  - Total: 1,466
  - Density: 1,019.5/sq mi (393.63/km^{2})
- Time zone: UTC-6 (Central (CST))
  - Summer (DST): UTC-5 (CDT)
- Postal code: 56232
- Area code: 320
- FIPS code: 27-14968
- GNIS feature ID: 2394469
- Website: dawsonmn.com

Dawson is a city in Lac qui Parle County, Minnesota, United States. The population was 1,466 at the 2020 census.

== History ==
The land Dawson sits on was originally home to the Wahpekute, Očhéthi Šakówiŋ, and Yanktonai people, three bands of the Dakota. Land was ceded to the US government by the Treaty of Traverse des Sioux in 1851. The treaties were signed on July 23 and August 6 in Traverse des Sioux and Mendota respectively. The land was ceded in exchange for $3,750,000, about 12 cents per acre. Little of the payment was actually received by the Dakota.

Dawson was platted in 1884. The city was named for William Dawson, a former mayor of St. Paul, and one of three partners in the Dawson Townsite Company. A post office has been in operation at Dawson since 1884. The city was incorporated in 1885.

== Geography ==
According to the United States Census Bureau, the city has a total area of 1.48 square miles (3.83 km^{2}), all land. The West Branch of the Lac qui Parle River flows through the city. U.S. Route 212 serves as a main route in the city. The BNSF Railway runs through the city.

== Demographics ==
Historical population
Census	Pop.	Note	%±
1890	418		—
1900	962		130.1%
1910	1,318		37.0%
1920	1,511		14.6%
1930	1,386		−8.3%
1940	1,646		18.8%
1950	1,834		11.4%
1960	1,766		−3.7%
1970	1,699		−3.8%
1980	1,901		11.9%
1990	1,626		−14.5%
2000	1,539		−5.4%
2010	1,540		0.1%
2020	1,466		−4.8%
U.S. Decennial Census; 2020 Census

=== 2010 census ===
As of the census of 2010, there were 1,540 people, 682 households, and 412 families living in the city. The population density was 1,040.5 inhabitants per square mile (401.7/km^{2}). There were 768 housing units at an average density of 518.9 per square mile (200.3/km^{2}). The racial makeup of the city was 97.4% White, 0.4% African American, 0.4% Native American, 0.1% Pacific Islander, 0.6% from other races, and 1.1% from two or more races. Hispanic or Latino of any race were 2.3% of the population.

There were 682 households, of which 23.8% had children under the age of 18 living with them, 48.5% were married couples living together, 8.5% had a female householder with no husband present, 3.4% had a male householder with no wife present, and 39.6% were non-families. 36.5% of all households were made up of individuals, and 19.8% had someone living alone who was 65 years of age or older. The average household size was 2.16 and the average family size was 2.78.

The median age in the city was 47.8 years. 21.8% of residents were under the age of 18; 4.9% were between the ages of 18 and 24; 19.5% were from 25 to 44; 28% were from 45 to 64; and 25.7% were 65 years of age or older. The gender makeup of the city was 47.2% male and 52.8% female.

=== 2000 census ===
As of the census of 2000, there were 1,539 people, 677 households, and 398 families living in the city. The population density was 1,043.4 inhabitants per square mile (402.9/km^{2}). There were 756 housing units at an average density of 512.6 per square mile (197.9/km^{2}). The racial makeup of the city was 98.25% White, 0.19% African American, 0.32% Native American, 0.32% Asian, and 0.91% from two or more races. Hispanic or Latino of any race were 0.52% of the population.

There were 677 households, out of which 24.4% had children under the age of 18 living with them, 53.5% were married couples living together, 3.4% had a female householder with no husband present, and 41.2% were non-families. 39.1% of all households were made up of individuals, and 25.7% had someone living alone who was 65 years of age or older. The average household size was 2.17 and the average family size was 2.88.

In the city, the population was spread out, with 21.6% under the age of 18, 6.7% from 18 to 24, 21.4% from 25 to 44, 20.5% from 45 to 64, and 29.7% who were 65 years of age or older. The median age was 45 years. For every 100 females, there were 87.7 males. For every 100 females age 18 and over, there were 83.0 males.

The median income for a household in the city was $31,442, and the median income for a family was $46,484. Males had a median income of $30,493 versus $18,750 for females. The per capita income for the city was $19,084. About 3.3% of families and 7.4% of the population were below the poverty line, including 5.0% of those under age 18 and 10.7% of those age 65 or over.

== Politics ==
Presidential election results 1960–2024

Precinct General Election Results
Year	Republican	Democratic	Third parties
2024	56.0% 440	42.0% 330	2.0% 16
2020	51.8% 401	46.8% 363	1.4% 11
2016	49.9% 376	44.0% 332	6.1% 46
2012	41.4% 318	57.3% 440	1.3% 10
2008	41.0% 326	56.6% 450	2.4% 19
2004	41.3% 366	57.6% 510	1.1% 10
2000	38.2% 334	55.4% 484	6.4% 56
1996	31.6% 290	56.2% 516	12.2% 112
1992	32.9% 319	45.0% 437	22.1% 215
1988	45.0% 399	55.0% 487	0.0% 0
1984	54.4% 519	45.6% 435	0.0% 0
1980	51.5% 511	42.4% 421	6.1% 61
1976	42.4% 552	55.8% 726	1.8% 24
1972	54.0% 524	44.1% 428	1.9% 19
1968	52.3% 463	45.8% 406	1.9% 17
1964	39.8% 366	60.2% 553	0.0% 0
1960	61.0% 550	39.0% 352	0.0% 0

== Notable people ==
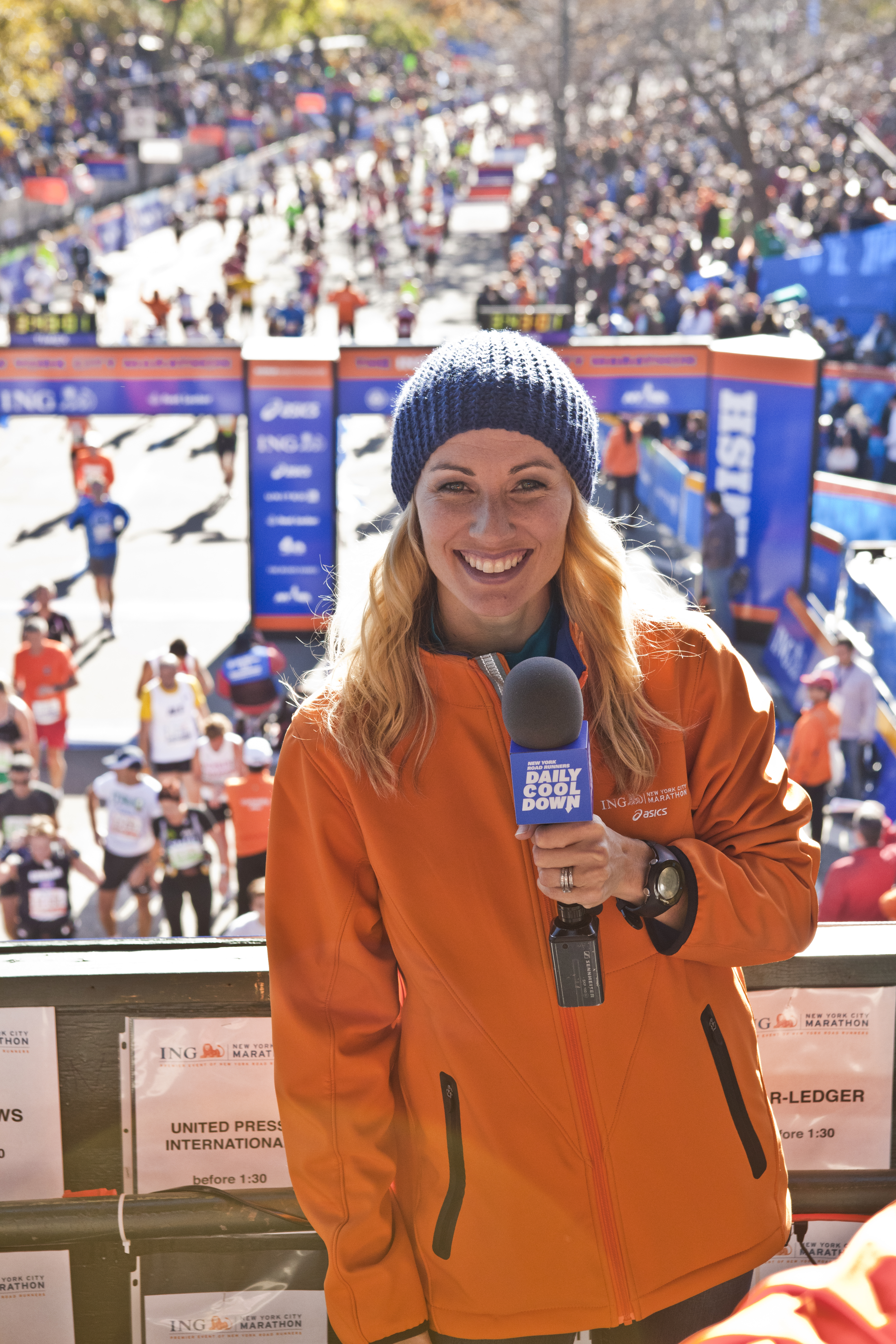
Carrie Tollefson

- Theodore Christianson - 21st governor of Minnesota from January 6, 1925, until January 6, 1931; publisher of the Dawson Sentinel.
- Theodore Christianson - Minnesota Supreme Court justice and eldest son of Governor Christianson
- Zach Durfee - NFL football player
- Phyllis Gates - Interior decorator and wife of Hollywood actor Rock Hudson (1955–1958)
- James Day Hodgson - United States Secretary of Labor (1970–1973) and United States Ambassador to Japan (1974–1977); born in Dawson
- Edor Nelson - baseball, football, wrestling, and hockey coach at Augsburg University
- Jeff Nordgaard - Second-round NBA draft pick in 1996
- Roger Reinert - mayor of Duluth, Minnesota; raised in Dawson
- Howard Wads Rundquist - businessman, educator, and politician
- Rudie M. Saltness - member of the Minnesota House of Representatives
- Carrie Tollefson - Olympian at 1500 meters in 2004, NCAA cross country champion in 1997

== Notable places ==
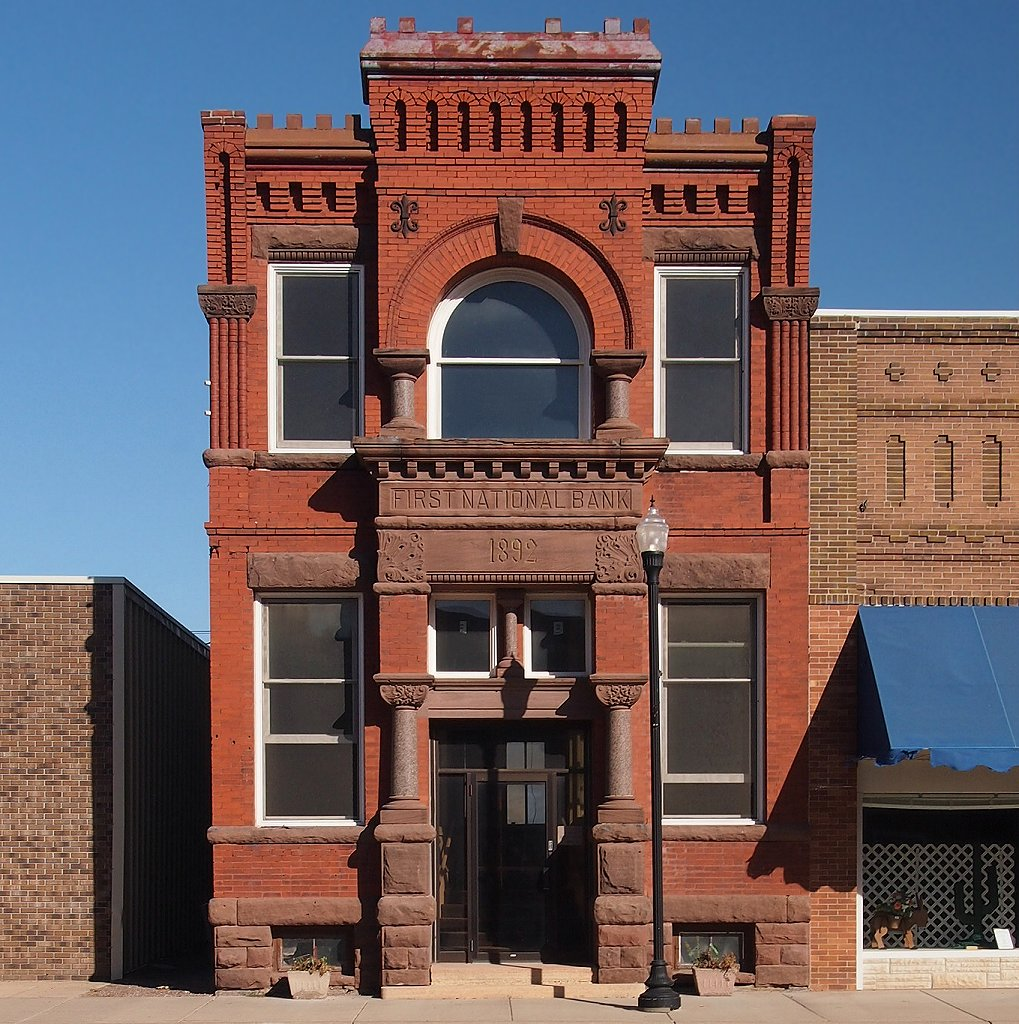
Dawson Bank Museum

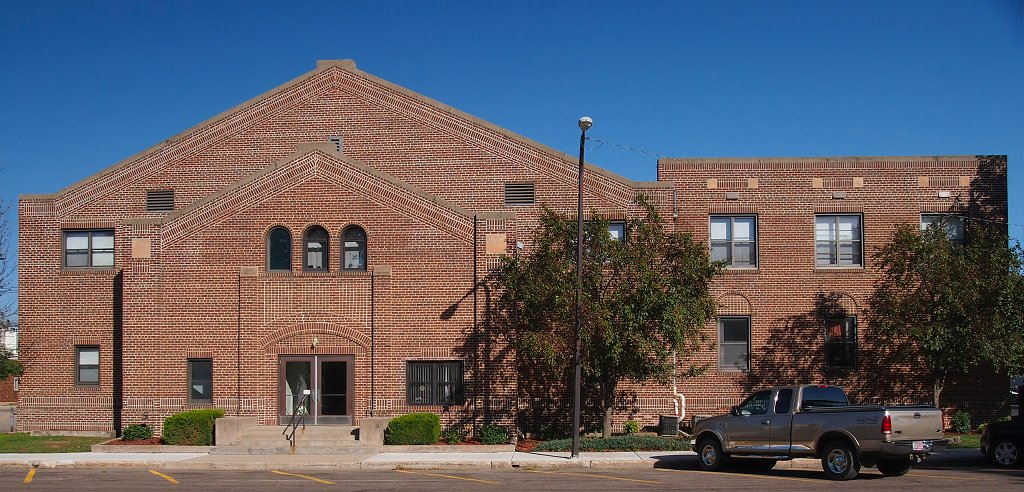
Armory

Dawson is home to the Dawson Bank Museum, a Carnegie Library building (now a law office), and an armory building (now a public library and apartments). All three of these buildings are listed on the National Register of Historic Places.

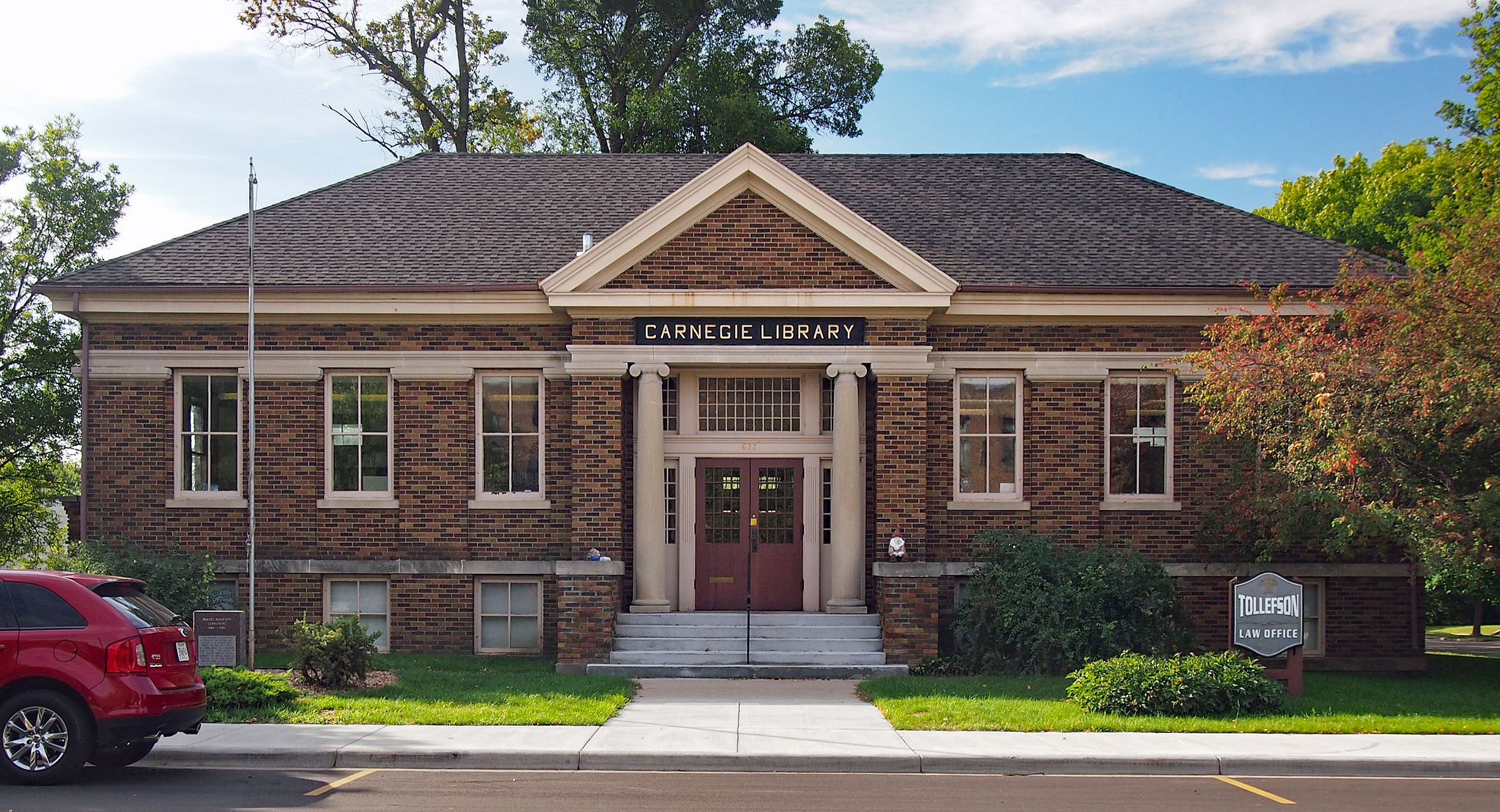
Carnegie Library

== In culture ==
- The movie Sweet Land (2005) was partly filmed in Dawson.
- Love Thy Neighbor, a 2019 memoir by Ayaz Virji and Alan Eisenstock recounts Virji's experience as a Muslim in the town in the wake of the 2016 presidential election.

== Town culture ==
=== Riverfest ===
Riverfest is Dawson's annual community festival, named after the Lac qui Parle River, which is held the last full weekend every June. Riverfest features events, like live music, sports tournaments, and canoe races, as well as the town's gnome unveiling ceremony.

=== Gnomes ===
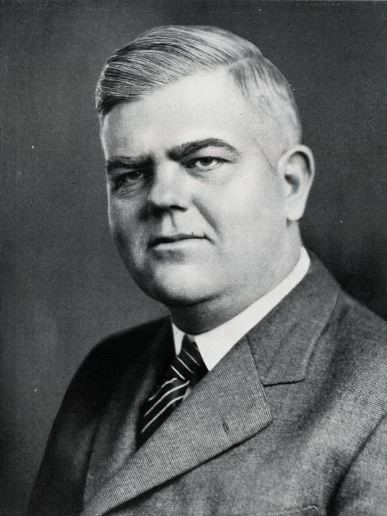
Theodore Christianson, Governor of Minnesota and first Gnome of Dawson

Dawson, also known as Gnometown USA, commemorates its notable citizens by making them into 3-foot tall gnomes that are placed either in the Dawson Public Library or Gnome Park. The gnomes are revealed to the community during Riverfest. Each gnome gets its own legend. (found here) New gnomes have been added every year since 1989. There are more than 40 gnomes in Gnome Park with more being added every year.

Gnomes of Dawson
Year	Name of Gnome(s)/Troll	Person/People/Thing Represented	Ref.
1989	Governor Ted	Theodore Christianson	
1990	Postmaster Bertha	Bertha Swenson	
1991	Scouter T.O.	T.O. Vaala	
1992	Doc Bill	Dr. Vilhelm Johnson	
1993	The Maestro	John Solie	
1994	Morrie and Kay	Morris and Kathryn Benson	
1995	Areta	Areta Schmoker Wold	
1996	Farmer Gerry	Gerald Michaelson	
1997	Baker Elder	Elder Molstad	
1998	Rudy	Rudy Prestholdt	
1999	Doc Phil and Jean	Dr. Phil and Jean Maus	
2000	The Merchant and the Miller	Harland and Gladys Thoen	
2001	Principal Vern	Vernon Stevens	
2002	Coach Steve and Irene	Steve and Irene Ruzich	
2003	Joe and Mary	Joe and Mary Givens	
2004	Del the Gnometographer	Delbert Thielke	
2005	The Reverend	Reverend G.S. Froiland	
2006	Superintendent Bob	Robert Clay	
2007	Harris and Eloise	Harris and Eloise Ronning	
2008	The Gnometown Fire Department	The Dawson Fire Department	
2009	The Founders of Dawson Mills	Glen Blomquist, Art Lee, John C. Hanson, and Bert Dahl	
2010	Mayor Richard	Richard Pollei	
2011	Al	Allan Schacherer	
2012	Alta, Ruth, and Shar	Alta Roesch, Ruth Solem, and Sharilyn Bates	
2013	HUGs and TUGs	The EMTs and First Responders	
2014	Bob and Marlene	Bob and Marlene Lee	
2015	Ole	Norm Olson	
2016	Doc Ralph	Dr. Ralph Gerbig	
2017	Virg	Virgil Thompson	
2018	Charlie	Charlie Prestholdt	
2019	Dennis and Ruby	Dennis and Ruby Anderson	
2020	Covidius Putrid Evilson the 19th (Triumph over the Troll)*	The way the community came together and overcame the COVID-19 Pandemic	
2021	Covidius Putrid Evilson the 19th (Triumph over the Troll)*	The way the community came together and overcame the COVID-19 Pandemic	
2022	Loren	Loren Femrite	
2023	Deb	Deb Breberg	
2024	Dan and Luanne	Dan and Luanne Fondell	
2025	Woody	Woody Peet	
*denotes troll
