= Lac qui Parle County Courthouse =

- U.S. National Register of Historic Places
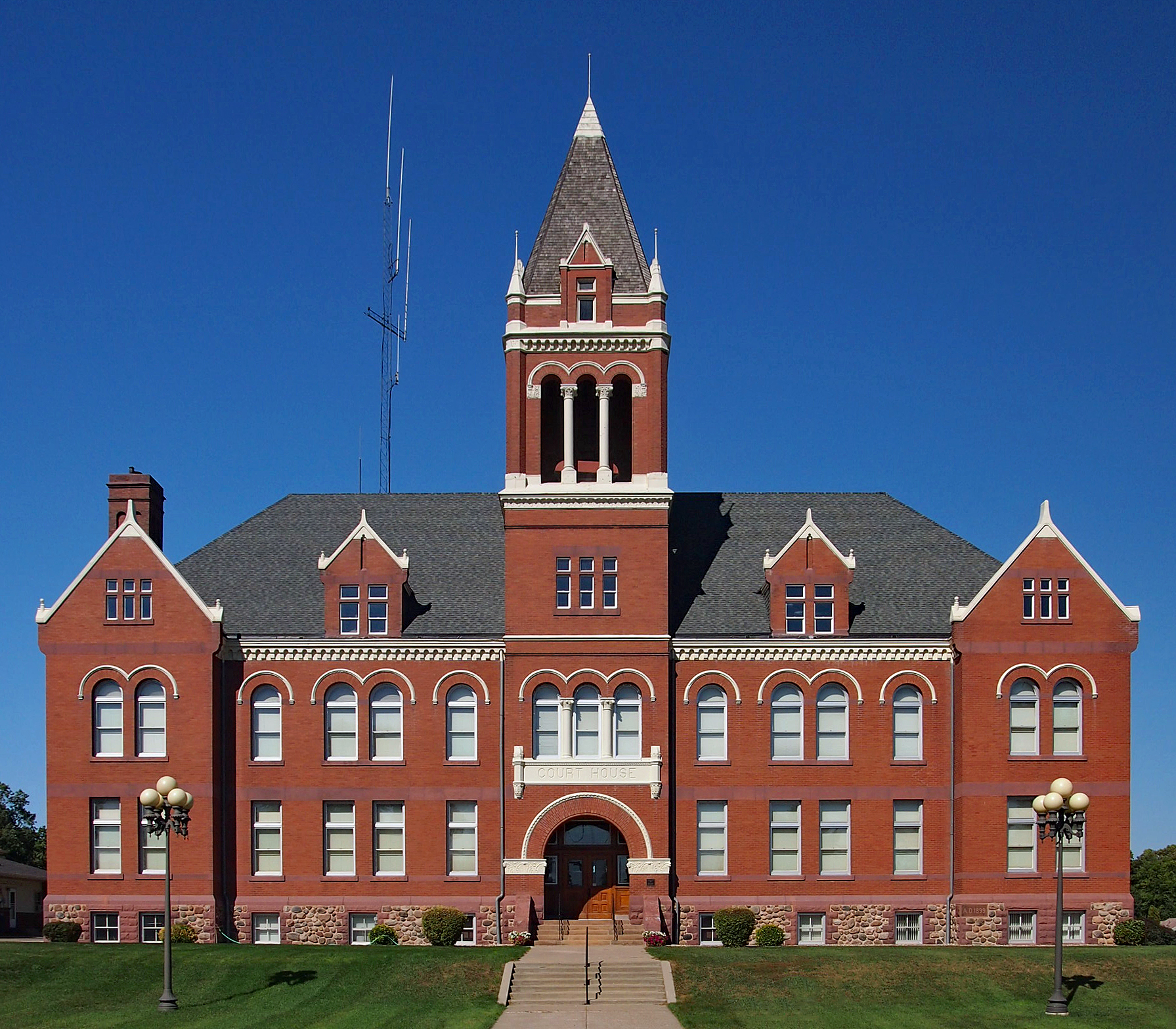
- The Lac qui Parle County Courthouse from the south

- Location within Minnesota Location within the United States
- Location: 600 6th St., Madison, Minnesota
- Coordinates: 45°00′54.1″N 96°11′35.5″W
- Area: less than one acre
- Built: 1899
- Architect: Buechner, Jacobson, Olaf Swenson
- Architectural style: Richardsonian Romanesque
- NRHP reference No.: 85001759
- Added to NRHP: August 15, 1985

The Lac qui Parle County Courthouse, located at 600 6th Street in Madison, Lac qui Parle County in the U.S. state of Minnesota is a Richardsonian Romanesque style building featuring a high central tower, built in 1899 at a cost of $30,689.

Architects Buechner and Jacobson designed it and Olaf Swenson of Saint Paul built it.

The foundation is of river boulders; the outside walls are red brick with sandstone accents. The interior features oak cabinetry, stairways, doors, and paneling. Floors are hardwood, except for the quarry tile in the hallways and marble treads on the stairs.
