= Morton Gneiss =

Ancient rock

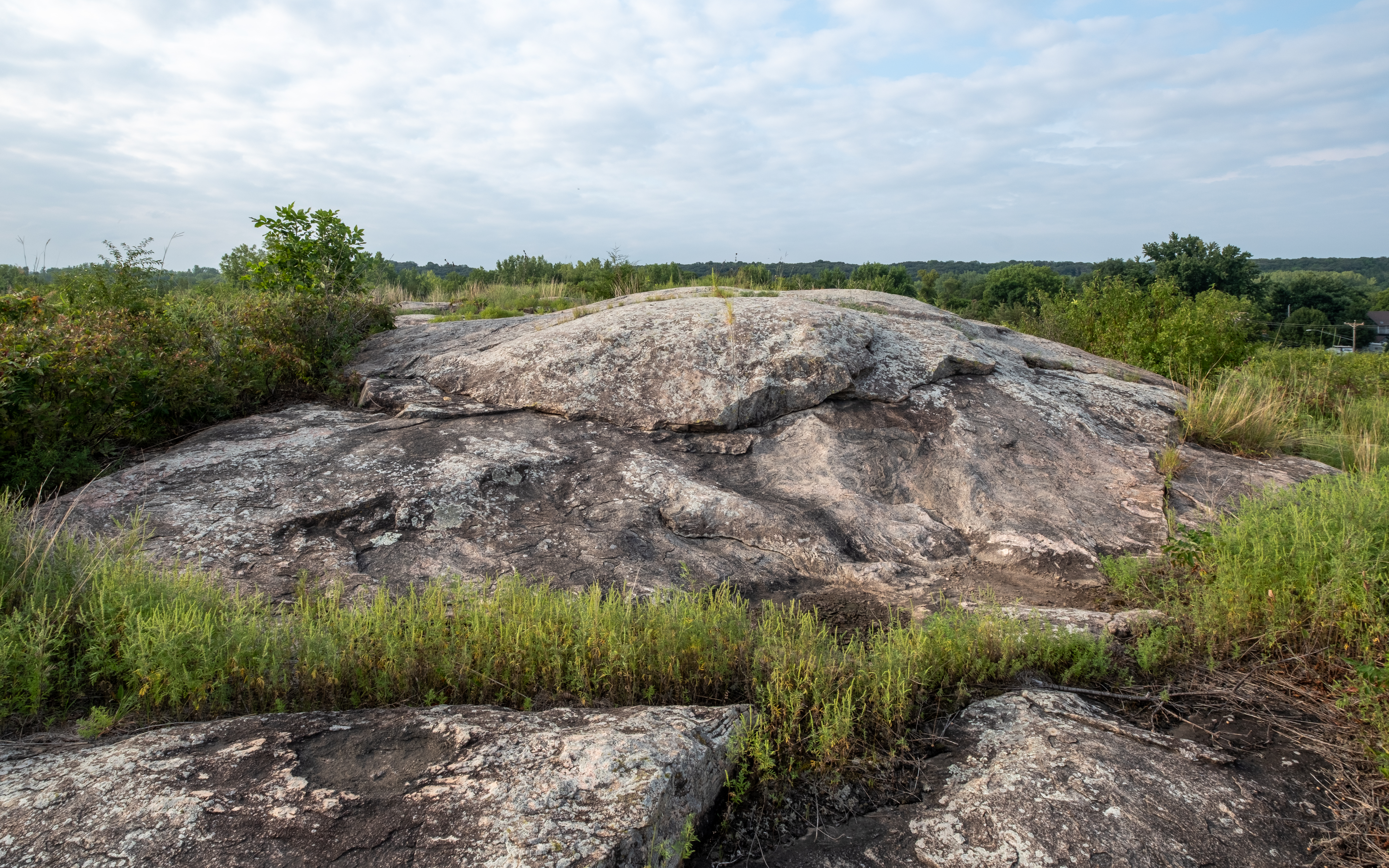
An outcrop of Morton Gneiss at the Morton Outcrops Scientific and Natural Area in Morton, Minnesota

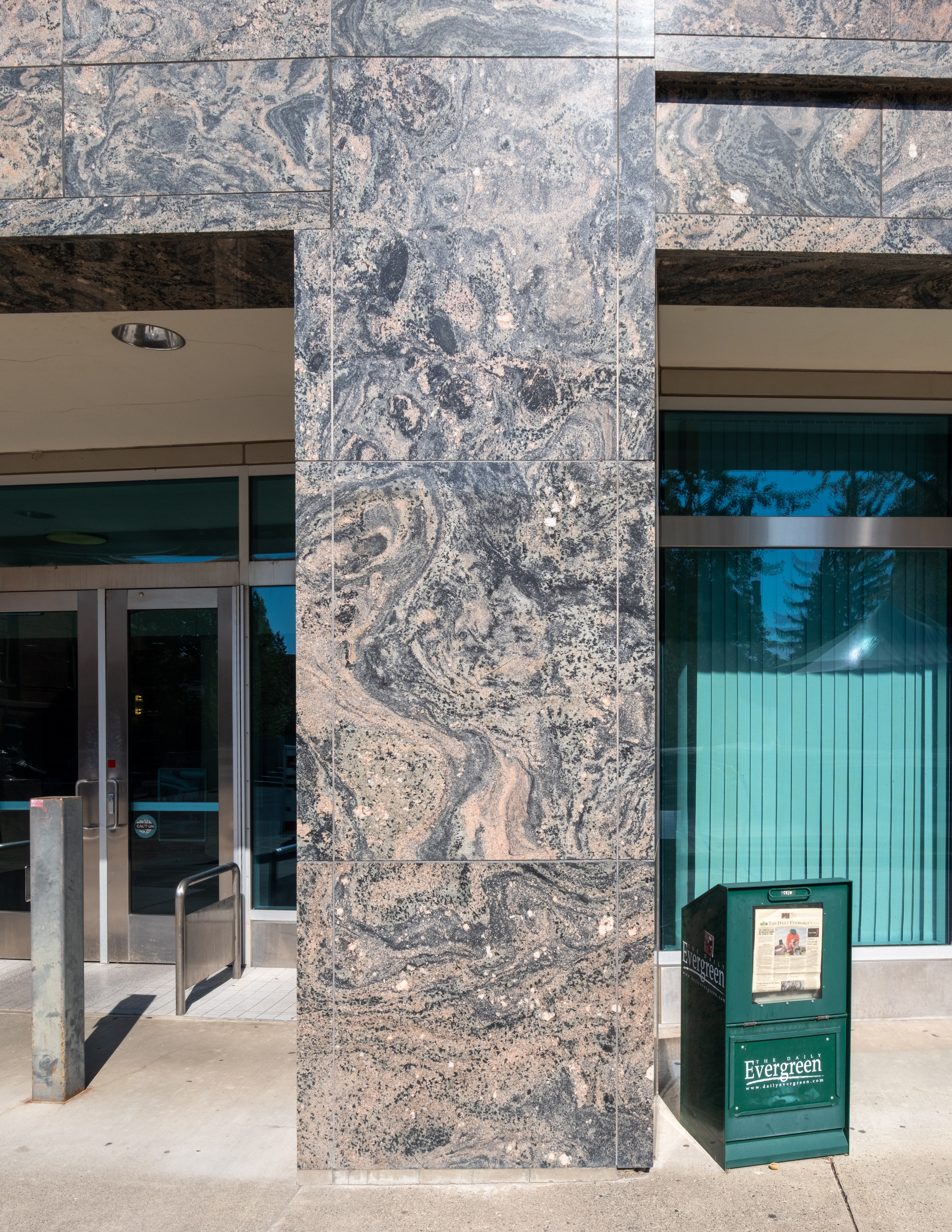
Polished Morton Gneiss at the Terrell Library at Washington State University

Morton gneiss, also known as rainbow gneiss, is an Archean-age gneiss found in the Minnesota River Valley of southwestern Minnesota, United States. It is one of the oldest stones on Earth, at about 3.5 billion years old. Along with the nearby Montevideo Gneiss, it is the oldest intact continental crust rock in the United States. Its type locality is in Morton, Minnesota.

Morton gneiss is quarried for monuments and as a facing stone for buildings.

== Formation ==
The rock known as Morton gneiss started out as a grey granite, formed about 3.5 billion years ago deep beneath the surface of the Earth. The molten rock cooled slowly, forming grains of crystallized minerals.

About a billion years later, two fragments of the Earth's crust collided at the future location of southwestern Minnesota, subjecting the granite to heat and pressure. These forces melted it once again and allowed intrusions of molten pink granite. The two granites folded and twisted; when they eventually hardened, the twists and folds remained. 800 million years later, another geologic heating event added additional color and texture.

When cut and polished, Morton gneiss shows bands and swirls of black, pink, and gray, with white flecks that sometimes look like galaxies and nebulae floating in space. The rock's colors come from quartz (white), potassium feldspar (pink), plagioclase feldspar (light gray), and biotite and amphibole (black.)

Zircon crystals from the gneiss have been dated to 3524 ± 9 Ma. Zircons from the Montevideo gneiss of nearby Chippewa County, Minnesota, have an age of 3485 ± 10 Ma.

== Exposure ==
About 100 million years ago, geologic forces slowly pushed Morton gneiss to the Earth's surface. The glaciers that advanced and retreated across southwestern Minnesota starting two million years ago covered the rock with hundreds of feet of till. The last glaciers began receding about 12,000 years ago.

A vast body of water known as Lake Agassiz formed in southern Canada, Minnesota, and North Dakota. When that water drained to the south, forming the Glacial River Warren, it carved out the Minnesota River Valley. This powerful flow washed away hundreds of feet of glacial deposits and exposed some of the Morton gneiss.

== Industry ==
Workers began quarrying this gneiss at Morton, Minnesota, around 1884. In these early years, railroads used it for track ballast beneath railroad ties. In 1886 the Swedish immigrant John Anderson arrived in Morton and took a job as a foreman in the quarry. It was located in the village of Morton, between the railroad tracks and the Minnesota River. By 1900, Anderson owned the quarry. He sold it to Cold Spring Granite in 1930.

== Uses ==
Architects have used Morton gneiss mainly in the lower floors of large buildings for its visual appeal. It enjoyed its greatest popularity during the Art Deco era of the 1920s and 1930s. The Adler Planetarium in Chicago, completed in 1930, uses Morton gneiss. Around the country it was used prominently in New York City, Detroit, Des Moines, Birmingham, Tulsa, Milwaukee, Hartford, and Cincinnati. It figures in two buildings at Washington State University: Holland Library (1950) and its addition, Terrell Library (1994). Though Morton gneiss is as tough and durable as granite, it has rarely been used as a structural building stone.

In Minneapolis–Saint Paul the stone was used by Northwestern Bell in its downtown Minneapolis and Saint Paul headquarters. In downtown Saint Paul it was used at the street level of the West Publishing building on Kellogg Boulevard and in the Osborn Building at Fifth and Wabasha Streets.

Since the mid-20th century, Morton gneiss has been used more for grave markers and mausoleums than for buildings. At the cemetery in Bird Island, Minnesota, a free-standing arch of Morton gneiss greets visitors. The Paul and Sheila Wellstone marker at Lakewood Cemetery in Minneapolis uses a large, uncut stone.

In Morton, the town's welcome signs are made of the gneiss, as are the front of the town liquor store and panels on the old high school. Its Zion Lutheran Church may be the only building made entirely of Morton gneiss. The stone is so plentiful near Morton that it is used as riprap along ditches and streams.

The State of Minnesota designated an outcrop of the stone in Morton as the Morton Outcrops Scientific and Natural Area.

Along with Kasota limestone, St. Cloud granite, and Platteville limestone, Morton gneiss is one of Minnesota's chief contributions to the built environment.
