= Little Minnesota River =

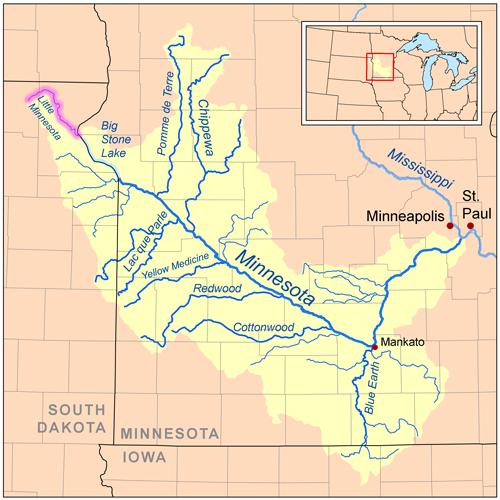
- Map of the Minnesota River watershed with the Little Minnesota River highlighted

- Mouth of the Little Minnesota River

Location
- Country: United States
- States: South Dakota, Minnesota
- Counties: Roberts and Marshall Counties, Traverse and Big Stone Counties Minnesota

Physical characteristics
- Source
  - location: near Veblen, South Dakota, Easter Township, South Dakota
  - coordinates: 45.689022°N 97.003452°W
- Mouth
  - location: Big Stone Lake
  - coordinates: 45.55390°N 96.79540°W
- Length: 71.4 mi-long (114.9 km)

Basin features
- Tributaries
  - left: Standfast Creek, Jorgenson River

The Little Minnesota River is a 71.4-mile-long (114.9 km) headwaters tributary of the Minnesota River in northeastern South Dakota and west-central Minnesota in the United States. Via the Minnesota River, it is part of the Mississippi River watershed.

== Course ==
The Little Minnesota rises in Marshall County, South Dakota from the Coteau des Prairies near the town of Veblen and flows generally southeastward through Roberts County, where it collects two small tributaries, Standfast Creek and the Jorgenson River. Near the Minnesota state line, it passes within a mile of Lake Traverse, part of the Hudson Bay watershed, from which it is separated by a low continental divide. The river enters Minnesota at the town of Browns Valley and shortly enters Big Stone Lake, which is drained by the Minnesota River. The region between Lake Traverse and Big Stone Lake is known as the Traverse Gap; it was formed by Glacial River Warren which drained Lake Agassiz (the lakebed of which is now the Red River Valley) toward the end of the last of the ice ages.

At Peever, SD, the river measures approximately 63 cubic feet per second.

== See also ==
- List of rivers of Minnesota
- List of longest streams of Minnesota
- List of rivers of South Dakota
