= River Warren Falls =

Former waterfall in Minnesota, USA

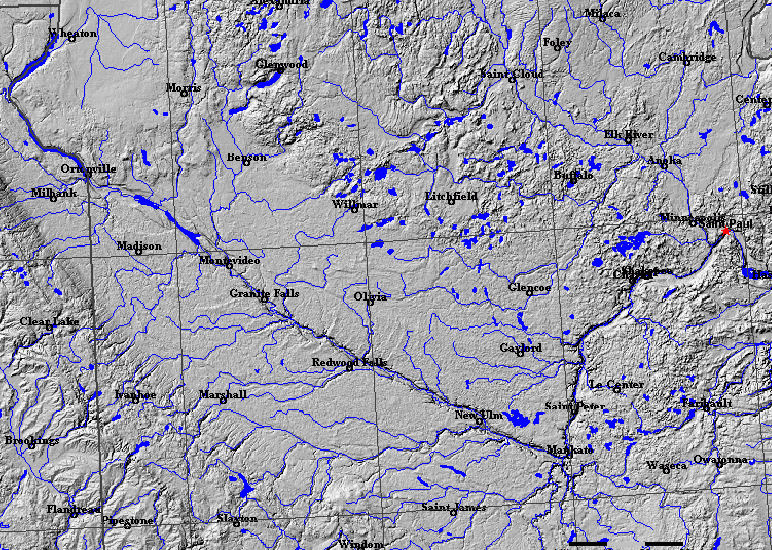
Relief map showing glacial River Warren valley - flowing northwest to southeast, then northeast, then southeast. Falls were in present downtown St. Paul

The River Warren Falls was a massive waterfall on the glacial River Warren initially located in present-day Saint Paul, Minnesota, United States. The waterfall was 2,700 feet (820 m) across and 175 feet (53 m) high.

== Geologic history ==
The area now occupied by the Twin Cities of St. Paul and Minneapolis generally consisted of a 155 feet (47 m) thick layer of St. Peter Sandstone, under a 16 feet (4.9 m) thick layer of shale, under a 35 feet (11 m) thick layer of Platteville limestone. These layers were the result of an Ordovician Period sea which covered east-central Minnesota 500 million years ago. The hard limestone cap was formed from fossilized shell fish. About 20,000 years ago, the area was covered by the Superior Lobe of the Laurentide Ice Sheet, which left the St. Croix moraine on the Twin Cities as it receded. Later the Grantsburg Sublobe of the Des Moines Lobe also covered the area. Under these vast layers of ice, tunnel valleys were formed, cutting through the limestone layer with tremendous force, to release ice meltwater and glacier effluence. The result was a series of troughs in the limestone, which were filled by glacial till and outwash deposit as the glaciers receded. Sometimes the sediment would be mixed with huge chunks of ice, which would leave voids in the soil, or kettles. These kettles created basins for the lakes of the Twin Cities, such as Harriet and Bde Maka Ska. Connecting the city lakes in several north–south arteries are gorges cut through the bedrock, but filled with sand and sediment.

== Glacial River Warren ==
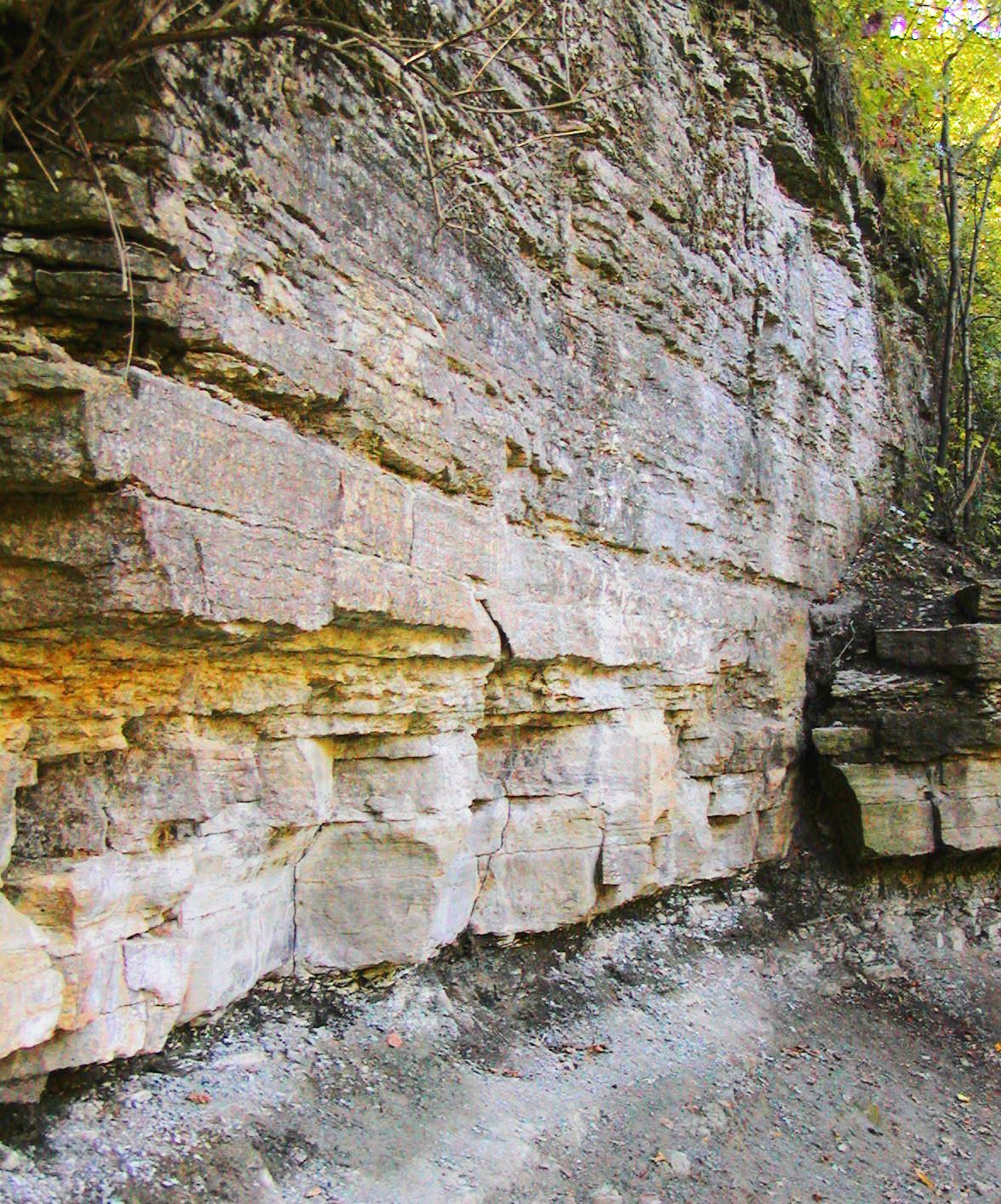
Limestone cap over soft sandstone base as seen in Minnehaha Park

When the great glacial River Warren began running 11,700 years ago, it cut a wide valley through central Minnesota, through the glacial till, but on top of the limestone layer. The Minnesota River now runs in the valley created by the River Warren. When the river reached present-day Saint Paul, the massive volume of water quickly washed out the till, sand, gravel, and sedimentary rock that had filled one of the troughs. The result was the Warren River Falls, plunging 175 feet (53 m) into a deep gorge. The turbulence caused by huge volumes of falling water washed out the sandstone underneath the falls, causing the thin limestone layer to break off in chunks. By 10,000 years ago, the waterfall had moved upstream to the confluence of the River Warren and the Mississippi River, adjacent to present-day Fort Snelling. By 9400 years ago, it had receded another two miles (3.2 km) up to Nine Mile Creek. At that point, Lake Agassiz broke through the ice to the north and began draining via the Red River of the North to Hudson Bay. River Warren then ceased to flow, but was succeeded by the much smaller Minnesota River which drained a smaller watershed. It carried soil and sediment, but with much less energy than its predecessor. It was less able to transport those suspended materials, which precipitated out and left deposits. Eighty feet (24 m) of this alluvium filled the river valley at Ft. Snelling, and 175 feet (53 m) were deposited at Saint Paul, refilling much of the gorge.

The hydrology of the oversized valley was first explained by General G. K. Warren in 1868. He made a detailed survey of the valley in his search for possible transcontinental railroad routes. Posthumously, in appreciation of this work, the glacial river that was the outlet of Lake Agassiz was named River Warren.

== Minneapolis waterfalls ==
When River Warren Falls receded past the confluence of River Warren with the much smaller Upper Mississippi River, a new waterfall was created where the Mississippi entered the much-lower River Warren. Those new falls receded upstream on the Mississippi, migrating eight miles (13 km) over 9600 years to where Louis Hennepin first saw it and named St. Anthony Falls in 1680. Due to its value as a power source, this waterfall determined the location of Minneapolis. One branch of the river coming from the west, Minnehaha Creek receded only a few hundred yards from one of the channels of the Mississippi. Minnehaha Falls remains as a picturesque and informative relic of River Warren Falls, and the limestone-over-sandstone construction is readily apparent in its small gorge.
