= Traverse Gap =

River channel in Minnesota, US

Coordinates: 45°35′6″N 96°49′48″W

- Valley
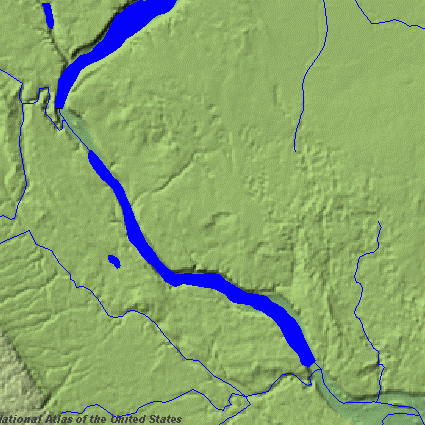
- The Traverse Gap is the spillway channel between Lake Traverse (top) and Big Stone Lake, cut through the Big Stone Moraine (NW to SE on this image).

- Location within Minnesota
- Location: Browns Valley, Minnesota
- Water bodies: Lake Traverse, Big Stone Lake

The Traverse Gap is an ancient river channel occupied by Lake Traverse, Big Stone Lake, and the valley connecting them at Browns Valley, Minnesota. It is on the border of the U.S. states of Minnesota and South Dakota. Traverse Gap has an unusual distinction for a valley: it is transected by a continental divide, and in some floods, water has flowed across that divide from one drainage basin to the other. Before the Anglo-American Convention of 1818, it marked the border between British territory in the north and U.S.—or, earlier, French—territory in the south.

== Geological history ==
The Traverse Gap was cut at the end of the last ice age. The Laurentide Ice Sheet decayed and receded as the Wisconsonian glaciation drew to a close, and glacial Lake Agassiz formed from its meltwaters. The glacier blocked outlets to the north, and the outlet to the south was dammed by the Big Stone Moraine, a terminal moraine left by the ice sheet's retreat. Lake Agassiz filled until it overtopped the moraine about 11,700 years ago. The resulting enormous outflow of the lake carved a deep spillway through the moraine, through which cascaded Glacial River Warren. This great river not only created the gap, it also cut the valleys of the present-day Minnesota and Upper Mississippi Rivers. River Warren drained Agassiz twice more over the next 2,300 years, separated by intervals when the ice sheet receded sufficiently to uncover other outlets for Lake Agassiz. About 9,400 years ago, Agassiz found a permanent outlet to the north. With its former source now draining elsewhere, River Warren ceased to flow, and the spillway gorge became the Traverse Gap, now occupied by much smaller lakes and watercourses and a flat valley floor containing marshes, agricultural land, and the small community of Browns Valley, Minnesota.

== Topography and hydrology ==
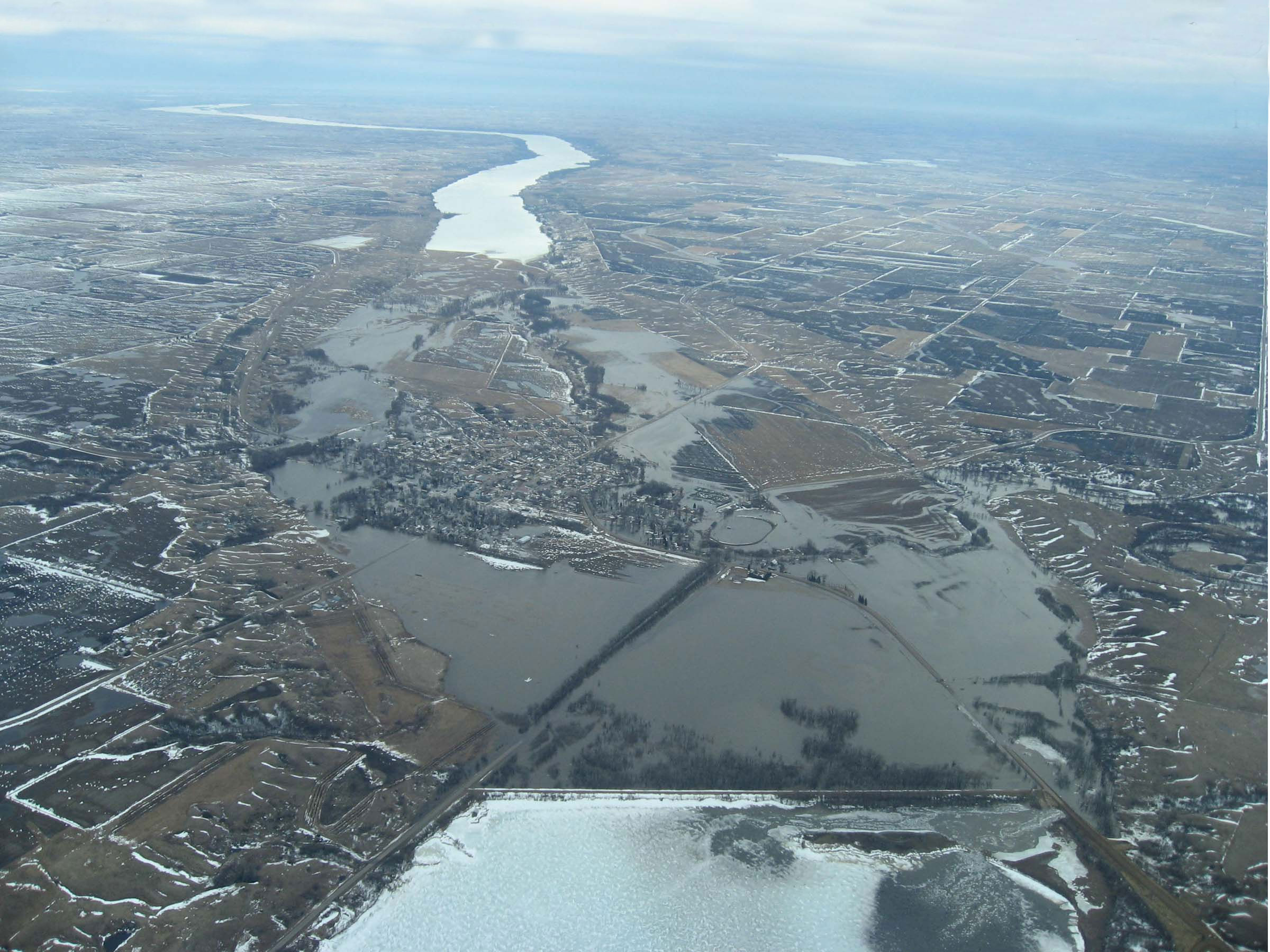
Traverse Gap looking south from ice-covered Lake Traverse (bottom of frame) to Big Stone Lake (top). Interbasin flooding is shown: The Little Minnesota River in the Mississippi watershed is entering from the west (meanders at center right margin) and is flooding the Traverse Gap (gray water, surrounding the town of Browns Valley in the center). At lower right, floodwaters from the Little Minnesota are crossing the continental divide and flowing under South Dakota Highway 10 into Lake Traverse in the watershed of Hudson Bay.

Despite the low elevation and flat topography of its floor, the Traverse Gap marks the southernmost point of the Northern Divide between the watersheds of the Arctic and the Atlantic Oceans. On the north, Lake Traverse is the source of the Bois des Sioux River, a source stream of the Red River of the North, which drains via Lake Winnipeg and the Nelson River to Hudson Bay in the Arctic Ocean. To the south, Big Stone Lake is the source of River Warren's remnant, the Minnesota River, tributary to the Mississippi, which drains to the Gulf of Mexico and the Atlantic. Big Stone Lake is fed by the Little Minnesota River, the headwaters of which are in South Dakota. The Little Minnesota enters the gap from the west and meanders south through the old channel to Big Stone Lake. The Little Minnesota, part of the Mississippi watershed, is less than one mile (1.6 km) from Lake Traverse in the drainage basin of Hudson Bay.

The floor of Browns Valley is flat, which allows the waters of one basin to flood across the Northern Divide into the other basin in times of high water. The maximum elevation on the floor of the valley is 987 feet (301 m) above sea level. The Browns Valley Dike at the south end of Lake Traverse is at the same elevation; this structure was built to reduce the likelihood of flooding south across the divide. At 983.9 feet (299.9 m), that divide is lower than the level of the dike, and flooding at Lake Traverse has the potential to drain over the Browns Valley Dike into the Minnesota River watershed. At the south end of the gap, the Big Stone Lake reservoir pool is maintained at 967 feet (295 m), but in 1997 it flooded to over 975 feet (297 m). The Little Minnesota River upstream and at a higher elevation near the divide has flooded to a level where it drained across that divide into Lake Traverse. While the natural state of the area has been altered by the dike and control structures on the two lakes, interbasin flooding did occur prior to construction of those improvements. The Traverse Gap therefore allows waters which would naturally flow to the Gulf of Mexico to flow to the Arctic instead, and in the past it has allowed water from Lake Traverse to flow in the other direction to Big Stone Lake in the Atlantic basin.

== Geography ==
The ancient channel at Browns Valley is a mile (1.6 km) wide and some 130 feet (40 m) deeper than the surrounding terrain through which it was carved. The distance from Lake Traverse to Big Stone Lake is about five miles (8.0 km). The ancient channel through the moraine includes the lakes as well as the lake between the lakes.

The continental divide crosses the gap transversely at its northern end. The Minnesota-South Dakota border longitudinally bisects the old channel. Roberts County is on the South Dakota side. To the east is Traverse County, Minnesota, and the community of Browns Valley near the continental divide. The southeast part of the gap is in Big Stone County, Minnesota.

== Human settlement ==
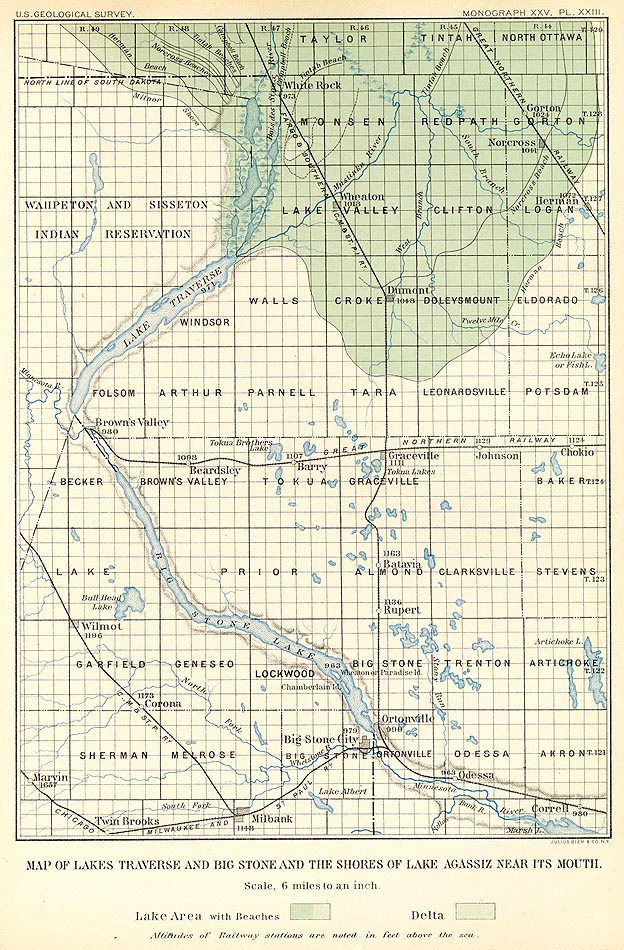
1895 map of the region of southern Lake Agassiz, showing how the lake (its bed shown in green) funneled into the Traverse Gap at Lake Traverse. The squares are civil townships and sections within those townships under the Public Land Survey System used to subdivide public lands for sale. Minnesota is to the east (right) of the watercourses; North Dakota to the north and west (upper left) and South Dakota to the south and west.

The area has seen human presence for thousands of years. A Paleo-Indian skeleton known as "Browns Valley Man" was unearthed in 1933 under circumstances which suggested death or interment after deposition of the gravel but before creation of significant topsoil. Found with tools of the Clovis and Folsom types, the human remains have been dated approximately 9,000 years before present.

The Traverse Gap was used by Native Americans, who "from time immemorial ... had placed two weather-beaten buffalo skulls where travelers paused to smoke a pipe at the divide." Its significance was also appreciated by early explorers, including Major Stephen Harriman Long, who led an expedition up the Minnesota River (then called St. Peter River) across the gap and down the Red River:

... we continued our journey in what appeared to have been an old water-course, and, within three miles of the Big Stone Lake, found ourselves on the bank of Lake Travers ... The space between Lakes Travers and Big Stone, is but very-little elevated above the level of both these lakes; and the water has been known, in times of flood, to rise and cover the intermediate ground, so as to unite the two lakes. In fact, both these bodies of water are in the same valley; and it is within the recollection of some persons, now in the country, that a boat once floated from Lake Travers into the St. Peter. Thus, therefore, this spot offers us one of those interesting phenomena, which we have already alluded to, but which are no where perhaps so apparent as they are in this place. Here we behold the waters of two mighty streams, one of which empties itself into Hudson's Bay at the 57th parallel of north latitude, and the other into the Gulf of Mexico, in latitude 29°, rising in the same valley within three miles of each other, and even in some cases offering a direct natural navigation from one into the other.

The native trails were later used by fur traders who had posts at Lake Traverse and Big Stone Lake, and then by Red River ox carts on the earliest of the Red River Trails. Eric Sevareid and Walter C. Port used the route on their 1930 canoe journey to Hudson Bay, described in Sevareid's book Canoeing with the Cree.

The area was surveyed and sold to the public in the late 19th century. The rural part of the valley floor contains pastures, cropland, and marshes along the Little Minnesota River. The vale was named "Browns Valley" after one of its pioneer residents, which in turn gave its name to the incorporated community near its northern end. The valley floor is crossed by Minnesota State Highway 28, which becomes South Dakota Highway 10 at the south end of Lake Traverse.

== Natural Landmark designation ==
The uppermost part of the bed of Glacial River Warren, including Big Stone and Traverse lakes, has been designated as a National Natural Landmark under the Historic Sites Act under the name of Ancient River Warren Channel. It received this designation in April 1966 from the United States Secretary of the Interior, giving it recognition as an outstanding example of a geological feature of the United States' natural history. The designation describes it as "a channel cut by the Ancient River Warren during the Ice Age, containing the Hudson Bay-Gulf of Mexico divide, with a lake on each side as evidence of the irregularities in Ice Age sedimentation".

== See also ==
- Geology of Minnesota
- Proglacial lakes of Minnesota
