= Big Stone Lake =

Reservoir in Minnesota and South Dakota, U.S.

- Íŋyaŋ Tháŋka Bdé
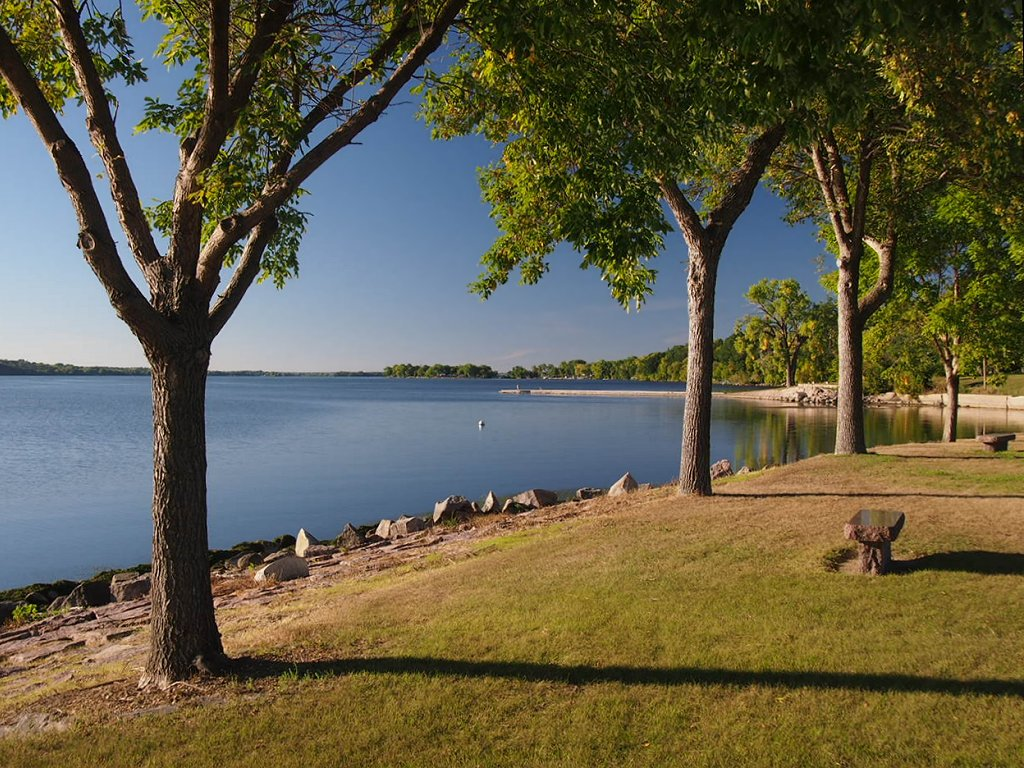
- Big Stone Lake from Ortonville's Lakeside Park, September 2013

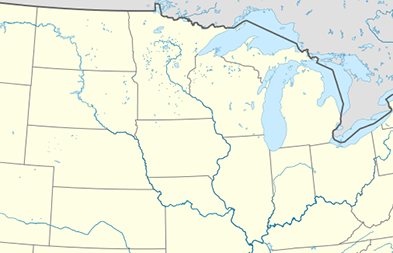
- Location within USA Midwest
- Location: Big Stone County, Minnesota / Roberts County and Grant County, South Dakota
- Coordinates: 45°24′28″N 96°37′04″W
- Type: reservoir
- Primary inflows: Little Minnesota River
- Primary outflows: Minnesota River
- Basin countries: United States
- Max. length: 26 mi (42 km)
- Surface area: 12,610 acres (5,100 ha)
- Max. depth: 16 ft (4.9 m)
- Surface elevation: 968 ft (295 m)
- Settlements: Ortonville MN, Big Stone City SD, Browns Valley MN

Big Stone Lake (Dakota: Íŋyaŋ Tháŋka Bdé) is a long, narrow freshwater lake and reservoir on the border between western Minnesota and northeastern South Dakota in the United States.

== Description ==
The lake covers 12,610 acres (5,100 ha), stretching 26 miles (42 km) from end to end and averaging around 1 mile (1.6 km) wide. At an elevation of 965 feet (294 m), it is South Dakota's lowest point. Big Stone Lake is the source of the Minnesota River, which flows 332 miles (534 km) to the Mississippi River.

Flow from the lake to the Minnesota River is regulated by the Big Stone Lake Dam, built in 1937 at the lake's southern end. Although modest, the dam controls a maximum capacity of 205,000 acre-feet. It is owned and operated by the state of Minnesota.

At its north end, the lake is fed by the Little Minnesota River, which flows through the Traverse Gap. Big Stone was formed at the end of the last ice age, when glacial Lake Agassiz drained through the gap into Glacial River Warren. The valley of that river now holds Big Stone Lake. The lake is shown on the 1757 edition of Mitchell Map as "L. Tinton", referring to the Lakota people, also known as Tetonwan ("dwellers of the prairie"). Big Stone Lake was named for nearby rock outcroppings.

Two state parks are at the lake: Big Stone Lake State Park in Minnesota and Hartford Beach State Park in South Dakota. They have picnic, boat launching, trail, and camping facilities. An educational center is part of the Minnesota park. Several vacation resorts are along the shores of Big Stone Lake as well. Visitors are attracted to the lake especially for its fishing: walleye, northern pike, and bluegills are all popular game fish with anglers, and the lake contains over 30 other species. There are 12 public accesses for fishing use. The lake is stocked every two years with 7,000,000 walleye fry.

The communities of Ortonville, Minnesota, and Big Stone City, South Dakota, are at the lake's southern tip. Browns Valley, Minnesota, is at the northern tip.

== See also ==
- List of lakes in Minnesota
- List of lakes in South Dakota
- List of Minnesota placenames of Native American origin

== Sources ==
- "Big Stone Lake". Minnesota Department of Natural Resources. Retrieved July 29, 2005.
- "Big Stone Lake". United States Department of Transportation. Retrieved July 29, 2005.
- Big Stone Lake Area Chamber of Commerce. Viewed July 29, 2005.
- ""Big Stone Lake Restoration Project"" (PDF). Archived from the original (PDF) on July 17, 2008. (255 KiB) . Environmental Protection Agency. Retrieved July 29, 2005.
- Spading, Kenton (January 2000). ""Browns Valley Dike"" (PDF). Archived (PDF) from the original on November 3, 2005. (2.17 MiB) . United States Army Corps of Engineers.
