= Browns Valley, Minnesota =

City in Minnesota, United States

Browns Valley
- City
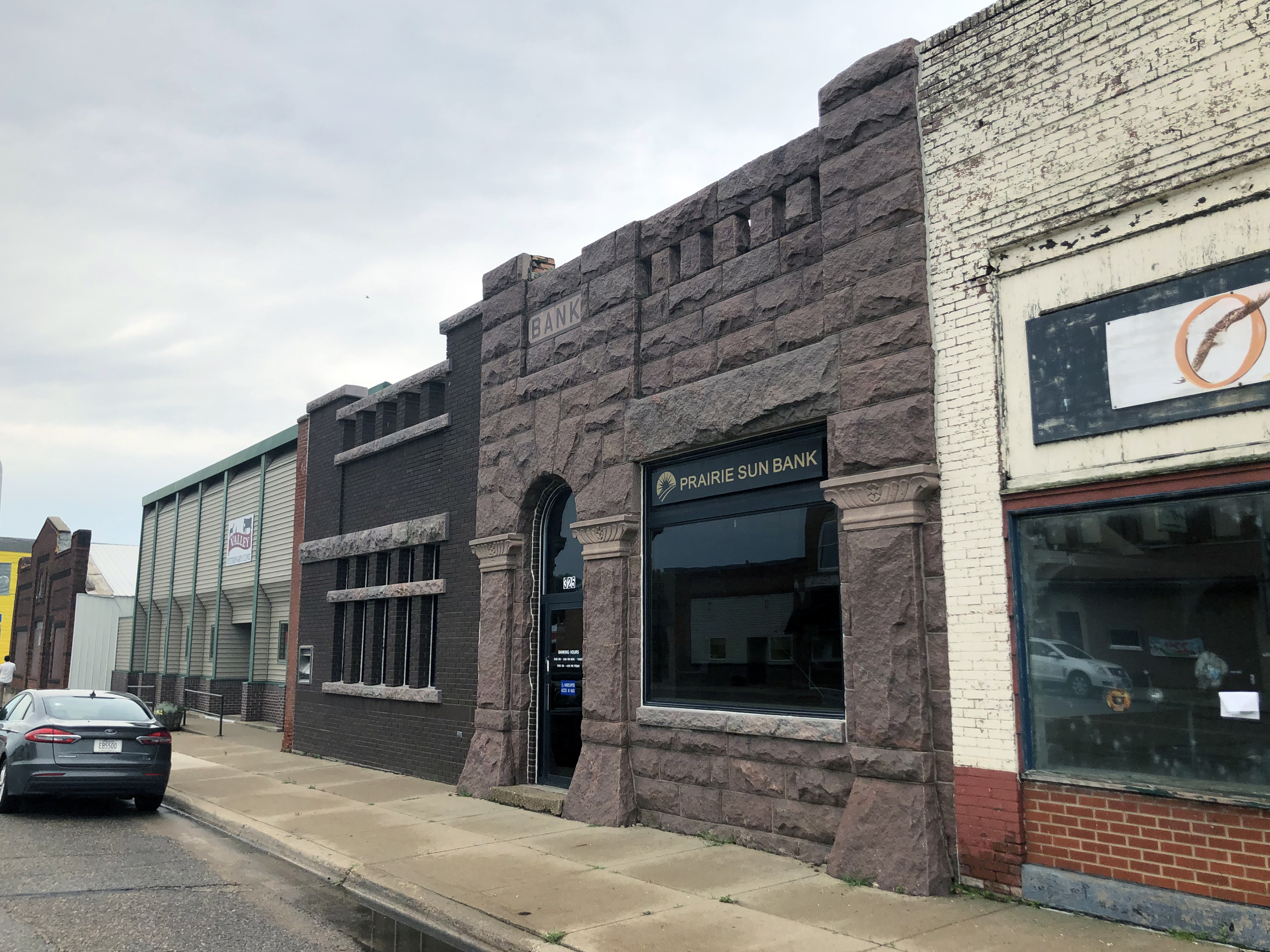
- Businesses in commercial district

- Location of Browns Valley within Traverse County, Minnesota
- Coordinates: 45°35′41″N 96°49′54″W
- Country: United States
- State: Minnesota
- County: Traverse

Area
  - Total: 0.78 sq mi (2.02 km^{2})
  - Land: 0.78 sq mi (2.02 km^{2})
  - Water: 0 sq mi (0.00 km^{2})
- Elevation: 988 ft (301 m)

Population (2020)
  - Total: 558
  - Estimate (2021): 546
  - Density: 714.5/sq mi (275.87/km^{2})
- Time zone: UTC-6 (CST)
  - Summer (DST): UTC-5 (CDT)
- ZIP code: 56219
- Area code: 320
- FIPS code: 27-08200
- GNIS feature ID: 0659752
- Website: brownsvalleymn.com

Browns Valley is a city in Traverse County, Minnesota, United States, adjacent to the South Dakota border. The population was 558 at the 2020 census.

Browns Valley lies along the Little Minnesota River between the northern end of Big Stone Lake and the southern end of Lake Traverse, which is separated from the Little Minnesota River by a low and narrow continental divide that skirts the northern edge of town. The city, both lakes, and the river lie in the Traverse Gap, the bed of ancient, south-flowing Glacial River Warren, the outlet to Glacial Lake Agassiz which, when drained, became the valley of the north-flowing Red River of the North.

== History ==
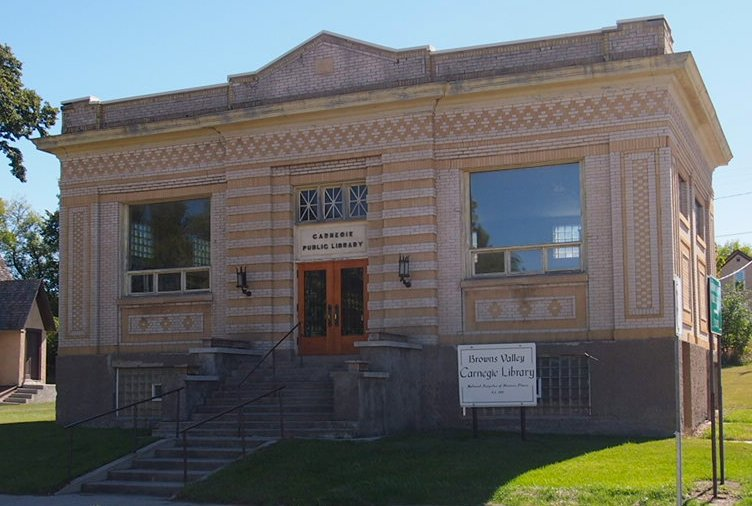
Browns Valley Carnegie Library, now a museum

Browns Valley was first settled in 1867 by Joseph R. Brown, and named for him. The settlement was platted in 1878. A post office was established in the community in 1867 under the name Lake Traverse. The post office was renamed Browns Valley in 1872. Two properties in the city are listed on the National Register of Historic Places: the 1864 Fort Wadsworth Agency and Scout Headquarters Building within Sam Brown Memorial State Wayside, and the 1916 Browns Valley Carnegie Library.

== Geography ==
According to the United States Census Bureau, the city has a total area of 0.79 square miles (2.05 km^{2}), all land. Browns Valley is rested in an old glacier path.

Browns Valley Lies in the center of Traverse Gap, a valley and ancient riverbed. This valley is also home to a continental divide. The divide is the southernmost point of the Northern Divide between the watersheds of the Arctic and Atlantic oceans. The area is also home to Browns Valley Man, the oldest human remains found in Minnesota. The remains were found in Traverse Gap and carbon dated to about 9,000 years ago.

Minnesota Highways 27 and 28 are two of the main routes in the community.

=== Climate ===
The Browns Valley weather station records some of Minnesota's highest summer temperatures; on July 31, 2007, a high of 107 °F (42 °C) was registered.

Climate data for Browns Valley, Minnesota (1991–2020 normals, extremes 1973–present)
Month	Jan	Feb	Mar	Apr	May	Jun	Jul	Aug	Sep	Oct	Nov	Dec	Year
Record high °F (°C)	63 (17)	65 (18)	83 (28)	100 (38)	99 (37)	110 (43)	109 (43)	107 (42)	100 (38)	96 (36)	79 (26)	67 (19)	110 (43)
Mean daily maximum °F (°C)	22.3 (−5.4)	27.1 (−2.7)	39.5 (4.2)	55.3 (12.9)	69.4 (20.8)	78.8 (26.0)	83.6 (28.7)	81.7 (27.6)	73.5 (23.1)	58.4 (14.7)	41.8 (5.4)	27.7 (−2.4)	54.9 (12.7)
Daily mean °F (°C)	11.4 (−11.4)	16.1 (−8.8)	28.4 (−2.0)	42.7 (5.9)	56.3 (13.5)	66.5 (19.2)	71.1 (21.7)	68.7 (20.4)	59.8 (15.4)	46.1 (7.8)	31.1 (−0.5)	17.9 (−7.8)	43.0 (6.1)
Mean daily minimum °F (°C)	0.5 (−17.5)	5.1 (−14.9)	17.3 (−8.2)	30.1 (−1.1)	43.2 (6.2)	54.3 (12.4)	58.6 (14.8)	55.6 (13.1)	46.1 (7.8)	33.8 (1.0)	20.5 (−6.4)	8.1 (−13.3)	31.1 (−0.5)
Record low °F (°C)	−40 (−40)	−41 (−41)	−20 (−29)	−3 (−19)	18 (−8)	35 (2)	43 (6)	34 (1)	19 (−7)	5 (−15)	−19 (−28)	−32 (−36)	−41 (−41)
Average precipitation inches (mm)	0.93 (24)	0.89 (23)	1.28 (33)	2.49 (63)	2.82 (72)	3.75 (95)	3.97 (101)	2.67 (68)	2.43 (62)	2.31 (59)	1.00 (25)	0.81 (21)	25.35 (644)
Average snowfall inches (cm)	8.8 (22)	9.0 (23)	5.7 (14)	4.9 (12)	0.0 (0.0)	0.0 (0.0)	0.0 (0.0)	0.0 (0.0)	0.0 (0.0)	0.9 (2.3)	5.4 (14)	9.5 (24)	44.2 (112)
Average precipitation days (≥ 0.01 in)	5.1	5.1	5.5	6.6	9.5	9.3	8.7	7.2	7.1	6.9	4.0	5.3	80.3
Average snowy days (≥ 0.1 in)	4.9	4.5	3.1	1.6	0.0	0.0	0.0	0.0	0.0	0.5	2.2	5.1	21.9
Source: NOAA

== Demographics ==
Historical population
Census	Pop.	Note	%±
1880	64		—
1890	498		678.1%
1900	721		44.8%
1910	1,058		46.7%
1920	1,073		1.4%
1930	981		−8.6%
1940	1,075		9.6%
1950	1,117		3.9%
1960	1,033		−7.5%
1970	906		−12.3%
1980	887		−2.1%
1990	804		−9.4%
2000	690		−14.2%
2010	589		−14.6%
2020	558		−5.3%
2021 (est.)	546		−2.2%
U.S. Decennial Census; 2020 Census

=== 2010 census ===
As of the census of 2010, there were 589 people, 247 households, and 141 families residing in the city. The population density was 745.6 inhabitants per square mile (287.9/km^{2}). There were 288 housing units at an average density of 364.6 per square mile (140.8/km^{2}). The racial makeup of the city was 75.2% White, 21.4% Native American, 0.5% Asian, 0.5% from other races, and 2.4% from two or more races. Hispanic or Latino of any race were 2.7% of the population.

There were 247 households, of which 23.5% had children under the age of 18 living with them, 38.5% were married couples living together, 13.0% had a female householder with no husband present, 5.7% had a male householder with no wife present, and 42.9% were non-families. 40.5% of all households were made up of individuals, and 24.3% had someone living alone who was 65 years of age or older. The average household size was 2.23 and the average family size was 2.97.

The median age in the city was 48.3 years. 22.2% of residents were under the age of 18; 5.4% were between the ages of 18 and 24; 18.7% were from 25 to 44; 23.7% were from 45 to 64; and 30.1% were 65 years of age or older. The gender makeup of the city was 46.0% male and 54.0% female.

=== 2000 census ===
As of the census of 2000, there were 690 people, 285 households, and 171 families residing in the city. The population density was 878.5 inhabitants per square mile (339.2/km^{2}). There were 317 housing units at an average density of 403.6 per square mile (155.8/km^{2}). The racial makeup of the city was 82.61% White, 15.80% Native American, 0.43% Asian, 0.14% Pacific Islander, 0.14% from other races, and 0.87% from two or more races. Hispanic or Latino of any race were 1.74% of the population.

There were 285 households, out of which 26.3% had children under the age of 18 living with them, 45.3% were married couples living together, 9.5% had a female householder with no husband present, and 40.0% were non-families. 36.5% of all households were made up of individuals, and 21.4% had someone living alone who was 65 years of age or older. The average household size was 2.29 and the average family size was 3.02.

In the city, the population was spread out, with 24.5% under the age of 18, 7.4% from 18 to 24, 17.8% from 25 to 44, 19.3% from 45 to 64, and 31.0% who were 65 years of age or older. The median age was 45 years. For every 100 females, there were 86.5 males. For every 100 females age 18 and over, there were 82.2 males.

The median income for a household in the city was $26,563, and the median income for a family was $30,208. Males had a median income of $25,500 versus $20,139 for females. The per capita income for the city was $15,062. About 10.3% of families and 14.4% of the population were below the poverty line, including 16.5% of those under age 18 and 11.0% of those age 65 or over.

== Politics ==
Presidential election results

2020 Precinct Results Spreadsheet2016 Precinct Results Spreadsheet2012 Precinct Results Spreadsheet2008 Precinct Results Spreadsheet2004 Precinct Results Spreadsheet2000 Precinct Results Spreadsheet
Year	Republican	Democratic	Third parties
2020	47.6% 91	50.8% 97	1.6% 3
2016	48.8% 104	42.7% 91	8.5% 18
2012	36.3% 81	58.7% 131	5.0% 11
2008	37.8% 102	57.8% 156	4.4% 12
2004	39.3% 117	57.0% 170	3.7% 11
2000	39.9% 116	49.5% 144	10.6% 31

== Notable people ==
- Charles Burnett, officer in Royal Air Force and Royal Australian Air Force during World War I and World War II
- Osborne Cowles, basketball coach
- Charles M. Dale, 66th governor of New Hampshire
- Arthur E. Nelson, U.S. senator from Minnesota
- Kathy Skroch, member of the North Dakota House of Representatives
- Arthur C. Townley, politician

== Flooding ==
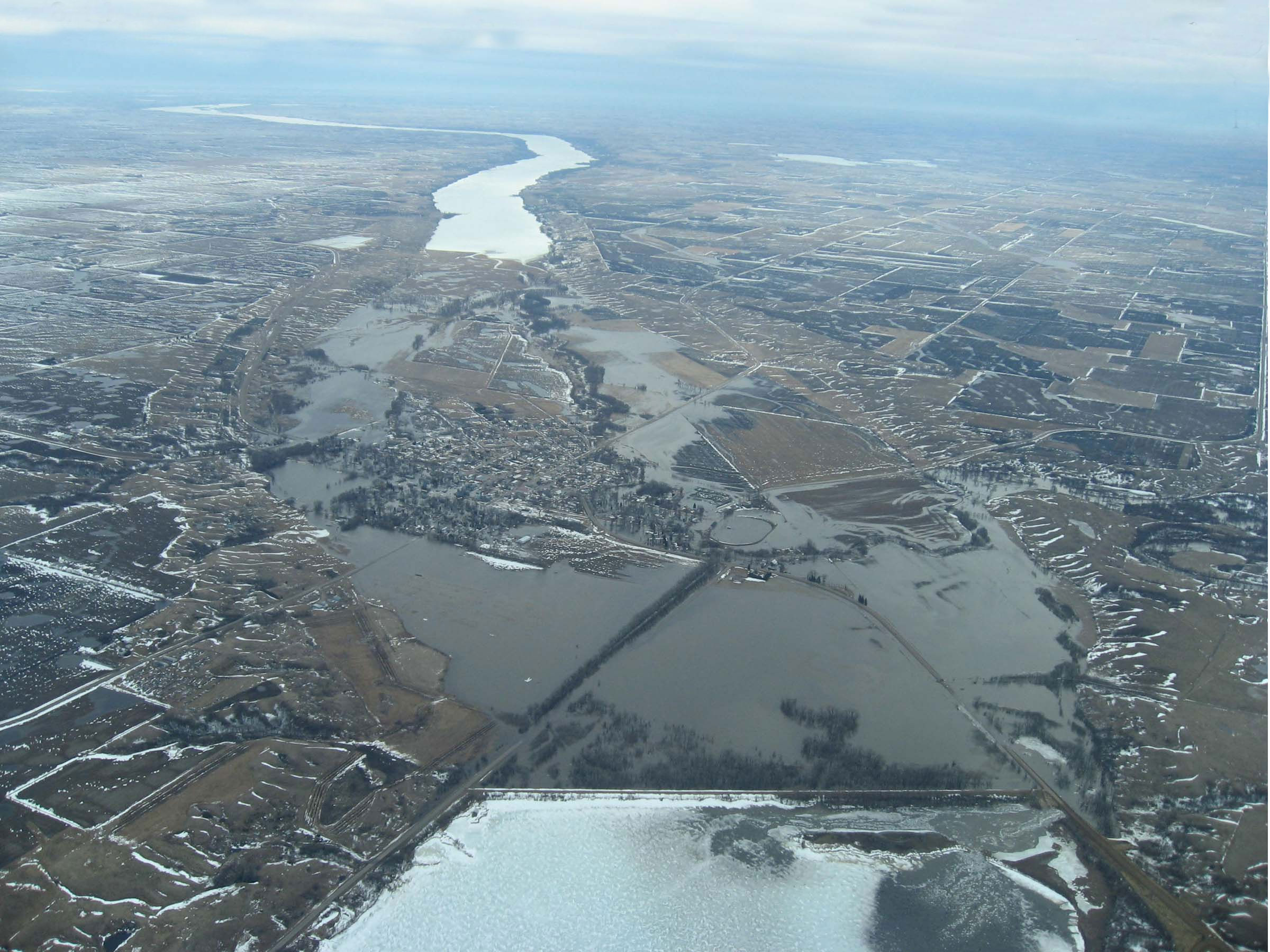
Traverse Gap from ice-covered Lake Traverse at the bottom of frame, south to Big Stone Lake (top). The Little Minnesota River is flooding the valley floor and Browns Valley (center).

In March 2007, Browns Valley was flooded from the north and west by the Little Minnesota River. One hundred people had to be evacuated from their homes, a significant percentage of the town's population. The damage was significant enough to warrant a visit from Governor Tim Pawlenty and Congressman Collin Peterson.
