= Herman Beach =

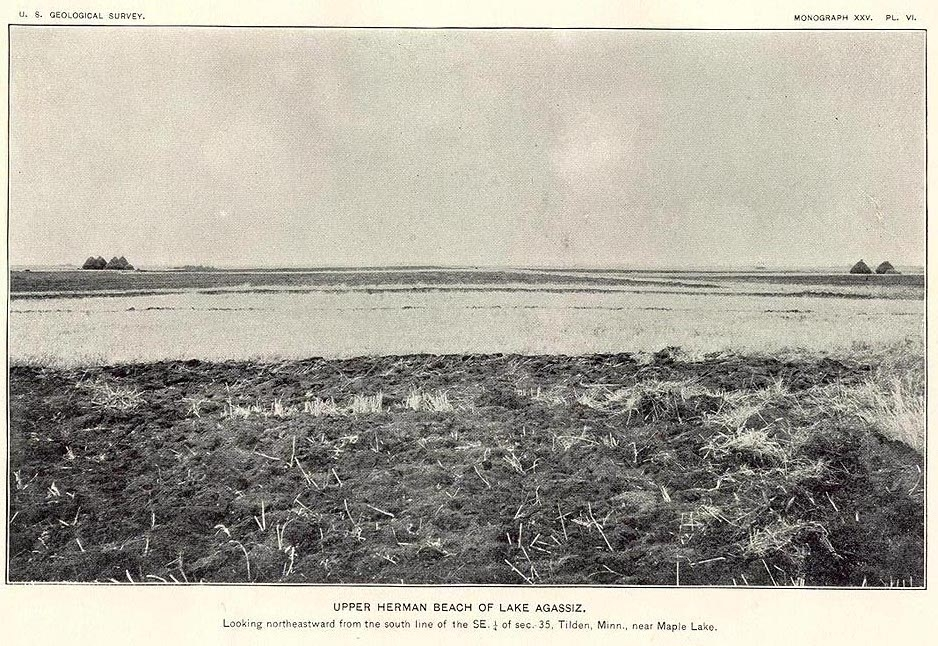

Herman Beach is one of several beaches delimiting the shorelines of the prehistoric glacial Lake Agassiz. Of note is that the beaches of Lake Agassiz are presently not adjacent to bodies of water, and consequently, are no longer really beaches at all. Named for its proximity to Herman, Minnesota, Herman Beach was formed 11,700 years ago and runs for hundreds of miles through Minnesota and North Dakota. It has been described as a smoothly-rounded beach ridge made of gravel and sand.

In contrast to the lakebed along the northward-flowing Red River, this beach rises from the south to the north and east at a gradient of approximately 1:5000; this rise resulted from the isostatic rebound of the land after recession of the last ice sheet.
