= Glacial River Warren =

Prehistoric river that drained Lake Agassiz in central North America

Coordinates: 44.8840°N 93.1779°W

Glacial River Warren, also known as River Warren, was a prehistoric river that drained Lake Agassiz in central North America between about 13,500 and 10,650 BP calibrated (11,700 and 9,400 ^{14}C uncalibrated) years ago. A part of the uppermost portion of the former river channel was designated a National Natural Landmark in 1966.

== Geological history ==
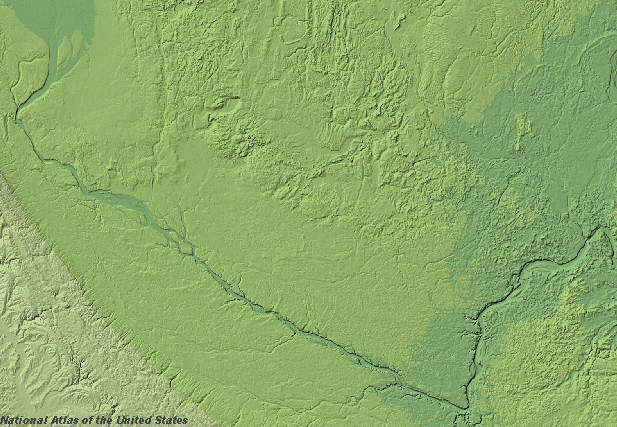
The valley of River Warren shows in this shaded relief image. At the upper left (northwest) is the bed of Lake Agassiz; its outflow breached the U-shaped Big Stone Moraine at Traverse Gap and became the source of River Warren. At the extreme right, the northernmost oxbow loop is the Mississippi at downtown Saint Paul. Just to its west and almost invisible is the valley of the Mississippi above its confluence with River Warren at Fort Snelling.

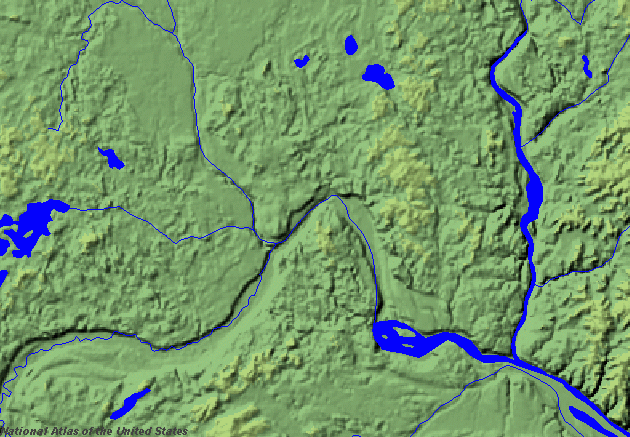
This shaded relief image shows the area of Minneapolis-St. Paul. The wide channel of River Warren enters the image from the southwest. The Mississippi enters from the north near the left side and the St. Croix enters from the north at the right. The present rivers are grossly underfit for their valleys; the widening of the Mississippi to the southeast is the slackwater pool from Lock and Dam No. 2.

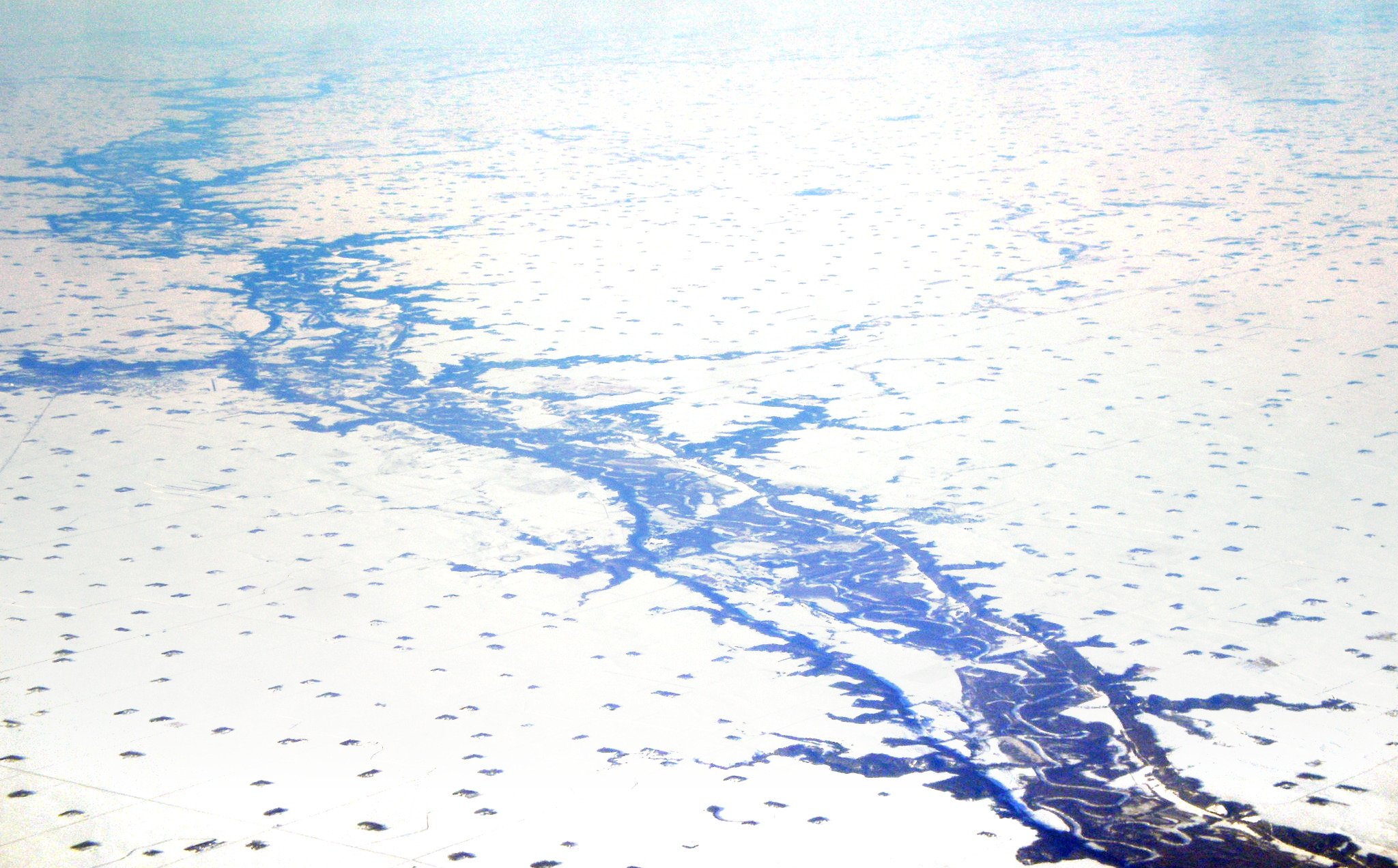
The Minnesota River Valley and tributaries as seen from an airliner at Redwood Falls, Minnesota. The Minnesota River occupies only a small portion of the wide valley carved by the Glacial River Warren.

Lake Agassiz was formed from the meltwaters of the Laurentide Ice Sheet during the Wisconsin glaciation of the last ice age. Agassiz was an enormous body of water, up to 600–700 ft (180–210 m) deep, and at various times covering areas totaling over 110,000 sq mi (280,000 km^{2}). Blocked by an ice sheet to the north, the lake water rose until about 13,500 BP calibrated (11,700 ^{14}C uncalibrated) years ago when it overtopped the Big Stone Moraine, a ridge of glacial drift left by the receding glacier, at the location of Browns Valley, Minnesota. The lake's outflow was catastrophic, and carved a gorge through the moraine 1 mi (1.6 km) wide and 130 ft (40 m) deep, which is now known as the Traverse Gap. The channel through the moraine, between Lake Traverse and Big Stone Lake, is now crossed by the divide between the watersheds of the Gulf of Mexico and Hudson Bay. Its significance was recognized by designation as a National Natural Landmark under the Historic Sites Act.

From Traverse Gap issued Glacial River Warren. From its inception until final abandonment of Agassiz' southern outlet, this stream drained the meltwater of that lake to the Mississippi valley. The drainage was not continuous, as Lake Agassiz periodically had other outlets. The Laurentide Ice Sheet retreated and advanced with climatic variations and these changes in ice cover contributed to isostatic adjustments in the level of the land over which the watercourses ran. These changes in turn uncovered or blocked the lake's other outlets to the sea.

== Course ==
While active this turbulent stream cut and eroded a bed up to 5 mi (8.0 km) wide and 250 ft (76 m) deep, leaving a valley which starts at Traverse Gap near Browns Valley, Minnesota, goes southeast to Mankato, then turns northeast to the Twin Cities. River Warren was joined by the comparatively small Mississippi at Fort Snelling, from which the valley continues northeast to present-day Saint Paul, where the massive River Warren Falls once graced the landscape. Over 1700 years this waterfall retreated upstream and undercut the Mississippi at the site of Fort Snelling. The falls then split. The Mississippi falls migrated upstream to form Saint Anthony Falls and create Minnehaha Falls in Minneapolis. The River Warren falls receded west in the Minnesota River valley until they reached an older buried river valley about 2 mi (3.2 km) west of the confluence, where the falls were extinguished.

From Saint Paul the great valley goes southeast to Prescott, Wisconsin, where it is joined by the St. Croix River, itself once the outlet of another proglacial lake, Glacial Lake Duluth which occupied the western part of Lake Superior. From its confluence with the St. Croix the valley continues southeast along the Minnesota–Wisconsin border. River Warren's effects include the creation of bluffs along the valleys of the Minnesota and Mississippi Rivers, and contributed to the formation of Lake Pepin.

== Disappearance ==
By about 9400 BP, the ice sheet finally retreated sufficiently far to the north that Lake Agassiz permanently took another outlet and receded below the level of Traverse Gap. River Warren then ceased to run. The Lake Agassiz area watershed now feeds the Red River of the North which flows north, ultimately to Hudson Bay. River Warren's upper valley in the Traverse Gap is now occupied by the tiny Little Minnesota River, which flows into Big Stone Lake and the Minnesota River, which follows the greater river's ancient bed to its confluence with the Mississippi River. These misfit streams occupy only a small cross-section of River Warren's riverbed.

== Name ==
The hydrology of the oversized valley was first explained by General G. K. Warren in 1868. He made a detailed survey of the valley in his search for possible transcontinental railroad routes. In appreciation of this work, the glacial river that was the outlet of Lake Agassiz was named River Warren.

== See also ==
- Geology of Minnesota
- Glacial history of Minnesota
- Laurentide Ice Sheet
- Proglacial lakes of Minnesota
- Warren Upham
