= Lake Agassiz =

Large lake in central North America at the end of the last glacial period

- Location in North America

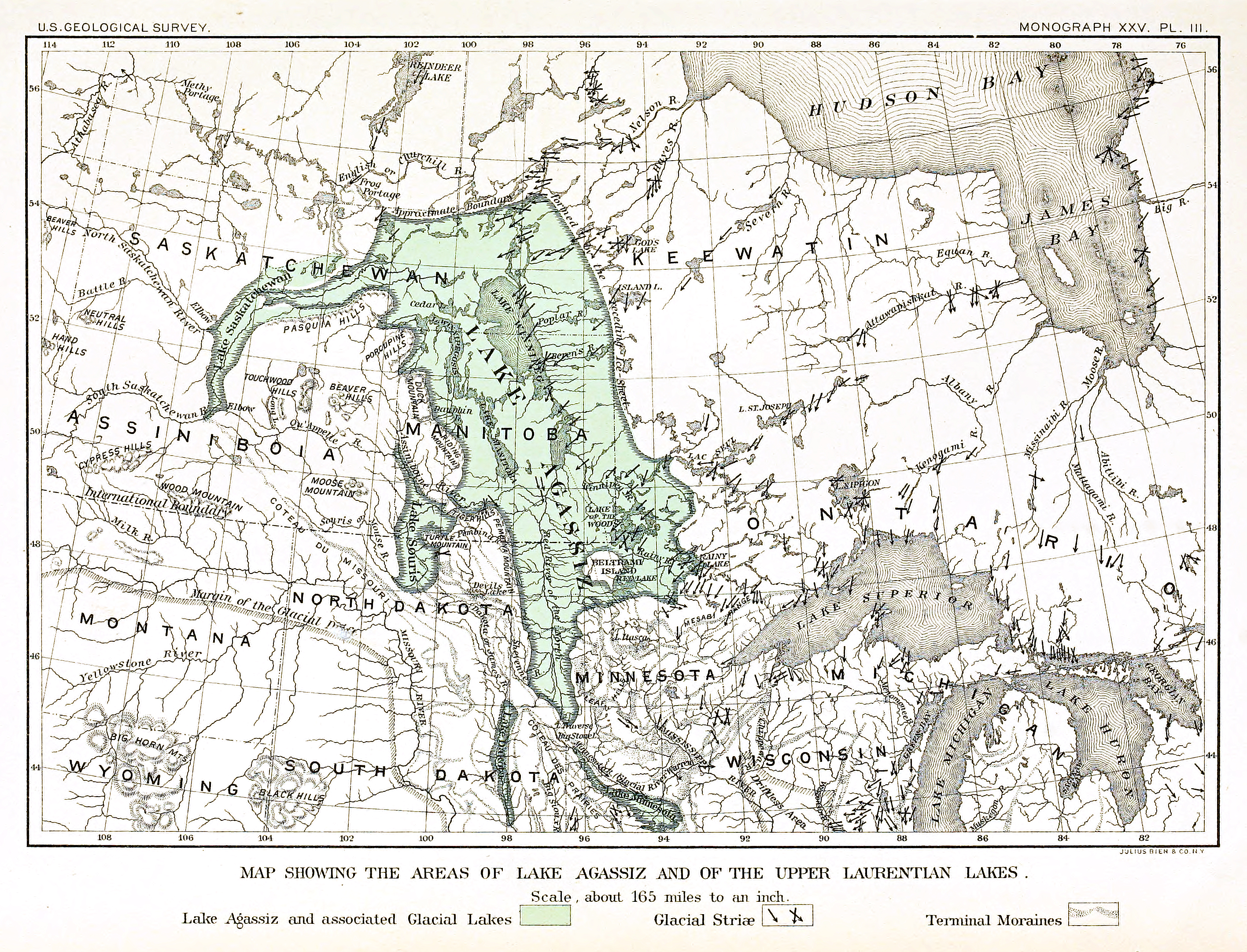
- Map of the extent of Lake Agassiz in central North America, by 19th century geologist Warren Upham. The regions covered by the lake were significantly larger than shown here.
- Location: Manitoba, Ontario, and Saskatchewan in Canada; Minnesota and North Dakota in the U.S.
- Coordinates: 51°N 97°W
- Lake type: proglacial lake
- Etymology: Louis Agassiz
- Primary inflows: Laurentide Ice Sheet
- Primary outflows: Glacial River Warren, the Vermilion River, the Wanapitei River, and the Montreal River valley
- Basin countries: Canada, United States
- First flooded: 12,875 years before present
- Max. length: 475 mi (764 km)
- Max. width: 296 mi (476 km)
- Surface area: 260,000 km^{2} (100,000 sq mi)
- Surface elevation: 335 metres (1,099 ft); 258 metres (846 ft); 325 metres (1,066 ft); 310 metres (1,020 ft)

Lake Agassiz (/ˈæɡəsi/ AG-ə-see) was a large proglacial lake that existed in central North America during the late Pleistocene, fed by meltwater from the retreating Laurentide Ice Sheet at the end of the last glacial period. At its peak, the lake's area was larger than all of the modern Great Lakes combined. It eventually drained into what is now Hudson Bay, leaving behind Lake Winnipeg, Lake Winnipegosis, Lake Manitoba, and Lake of the Woods.

First postulated in 1823 by William H. Keating, it was named by Warren Upham in 1879 after Louis Agassiz, the then recently deceased (1873) founder of glaciology, when Upham recognized that the lake was formed by glacial action.

== Geological progression ==
During the last glacial maximum, northern North America was covered by an ice sheet, which alternately advanced and retreated with variations in the climate. This continental ice sheet formed during the period now known as the Wisconsin glaciation, and covered much of central North America between 30,000 and 10,000 years ago. As the ice sheet disintegrated, its meltwaters created an immense proglacial lake.

Around 13,000 years ago, this lake came to cover much of what are now southeastern Manitoba, northwestern Ontario, northern Minnesota, eastern North Dakota, and Saskatchewan. At its greatest extent, it may have covered as much as 440,000 km^{2} (170,000 sq mi), larger than any currently existing lake in the world (including the Caspian Sea) and approximately the area of the Black Sea.

At times the lake drained south through the Traverse Gap into Glacial River Warren (parent to the Minnesota River, a tributary of the Mississippi River), east through Lake Kelvin (modern Lake Nipigon) to what is now Lake Superior, and northwest through the Clearwater Spillway to the Mackenzie River System and the Arctic Ocean about 13,000 years ago.

The ice returned to the south for a time, but as it again retreated north of the present Canada–United States border around 10,000 years ago, Lake Agassiz refilled. The last major shift in drainage occurred around 8,200 years ago. The melting of remaining Hudson Bay ice caused Lake Agassiz to drain nearly completely. This final drainage of Lake Agassiz has been associated with an estimated 0.8 to 2.8 m (2.6 to 9.2 ft) rise in global sea levels.

Lake Agassiz's major drainage reorganization events were of such magnitudes that they significantly impacted climate, sea level, and possibly early human civilization. The lake's enormous freshwater release into the Arctic Ocean has been postulated to have disrupted oceanic circulation and caused temporary cooling. The draining of 13,000 years ago may be the cause of the Younger Dryas stadial. Although disputed, the draining at 9,900–10,000 years ago may be the cause of the 8,200 yr climate event. A study by Turney and Brown links the 8,500-years-ago drainage to the expansion of agriculture from east to west across Europe; they suggest that this drainage may also account for various flood myths of ancient cultures, including the Biblical flood narrative.

== Glacial River Warren outlet ==
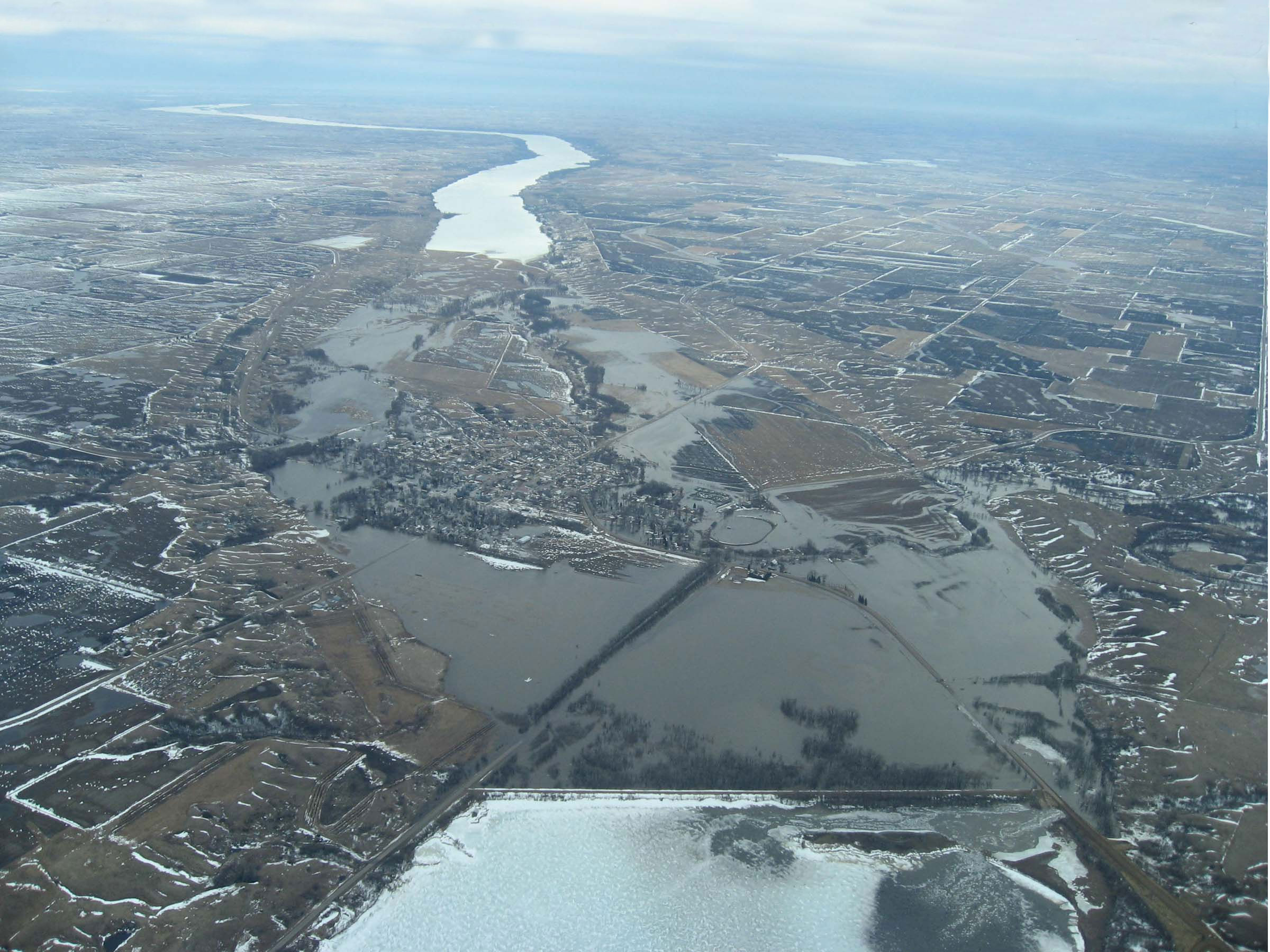
Traverse Gap in the riverbed of Glacial River Warren. The former southern outlet of Lake Agassiz and source of River Warren is at Lake Traverse at the bottom of the photo; the flooded valley in the center (now Browns Valley) and Big Stone Lake in the distance are relics of the river.

The lowest point between the drainage of Hudson Bay and the Gulf of Mexico is in the Traverse Gap between the U.S. states of Minnesota and South Dakota. It lies between Lake Traverse and Big Stone Lake. This continental divide is about 300 metres (980 ft) above sea level. When Lake Agassiz existed, the gap was the outlet to River Warren. The outflow from the melting glaciers filled Lake Agassiz and then drained through the gap to the Gulf of Mexico. This mass of moving water eroded a valley 2–5 kilometres (1.2–3.1 mi) wide and from 100 to 125 feet (30 to 38 m) deep. Today, this valley contains the Minnesota River, joined by the Upper Mississippi River at Fort Snelling, Minnesota.

North of the gap, the Red River of the North flows from Lake Traverse north through the former lakebed of Lake Agassiz to Lake Winnipeg.

== Phases ==
=== Lockhart Phase: 12,875–12,560 YBP ===
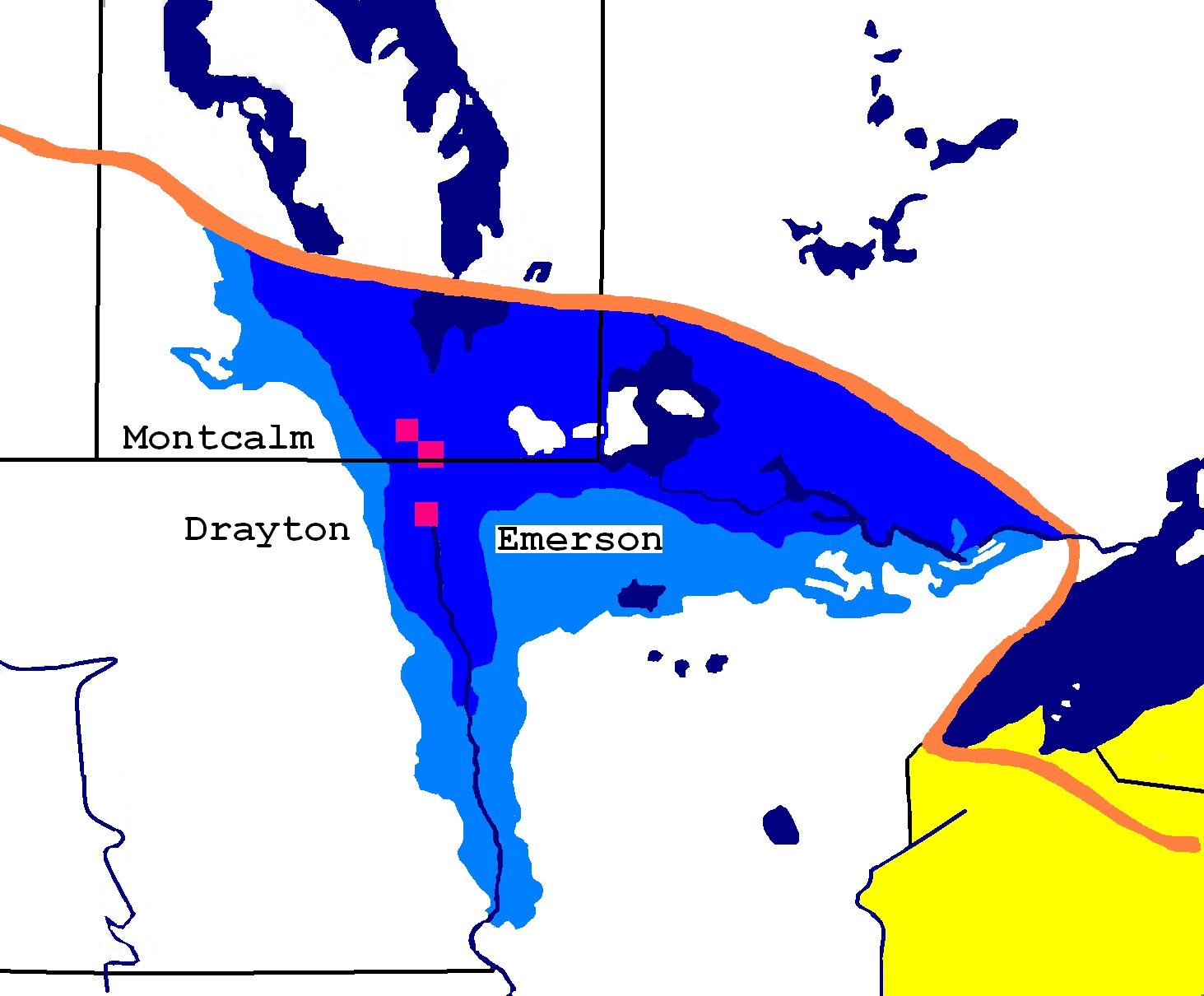
Lockhart Phase of Lake Agassiz, c. 13,000 YBP. Teller and Leverington, 2004 (U.S. Geological Survey)

During the Lockhart Phase, water accumulated in the Red River valley of North Dakota and Minnesota. As the water reached to the top of the divide to the south, the water drained into the ancestral Minnesota and Mississippi River systems. This occurred while the Laurentian Ice Sheet was at or south of the current Canada–US border. As the ice sheet melted northward, an early Lake Agassiz covered southern Manitoba, the Minnesota and Ontario boundary country, and along the Red River south of Fargo, North Dakota. The Lockhart Phase is associated with the Herman lake stage (335 metres (1,099 ft)), the highest shoreline of Lake Agassiz. The Big Stone Moraine formed the southern boundary of the lake. During the Lockhart Phase the lake is estimated to have been 231 metres (758 ft) deep, with greater depths near the glacier.

=== Moorhead Phase: 12,560–11,690 YBP ===
As the ice sheet melted northward, Lake Agassiz found a lower outlet through the Kaministikwia route along the modern Minnesota–Ontario border. This moved water to Lake Duluth, a proglacial lake in the Lake Superior basin. From there the water drained south via an ancestral St. Croix and Mississippi River systems. The lake drained below the Herman lake beaches until isostatic rebound and glacial advances closed the Kaministikwia route. This stabilized the lake at the Norcross lake stage (325 metres (1,066 ft)). The average depth of Lake Agassiz during the late Moorhead Phase was 258 metres (846 ft). Drainage from Lake Agassiz continued to flow southward out of the ancient Minnesota and Mississippi River systems into the Gulf of Mexico.

=== Emerson Phase: 11,690–10,630 YBP ===
During the Emerson Phase, lake levels and drainage patterns continually fluctuated. The lake switched from a southward outlet to a northwestern outlet, and may have been static without a significant outlet during this phase. Isostatic rebound changed the elevation of the land, and this, combined with changes in the volume of meltwater from the ice margin and the closure of the Kaministikwia outlet in the east increased the size of the northern end of the lake. One hypothesis postulates that the lake was a 'terminal lake' with water inflows and evapotranspiration being equal. Dating of the glacial moraines shows that the Clearwater and Athabasca River system and Lake Nipigon and Minong basin were still ice-covered. A period of precipitation and meltwater input balance with the rate of evapotranspiration may have existed for a short period of time. During this phase, the Clearwater and Athabasca River system outlet opened. Isostatic rebound opened the southern outlet for a time, creating the Norcross (325 metres (1,066 ft)), Tintah (310 metres (1,020 ft)), and Upper Campbell (299 metres (981 ft)) beaches. The south outlet was permanently closed at the end of Emerson Phase.

=== Nipigon Phase: 10,630–9,160 YBP ===
The opening of the Kaministiquia outlet to the east initiated the onset of the Nipigon Phase. The lower lake level ended the southern outlet through the ancestral Minnesota and Mississippi River systems. The ice sheets advanced and blocked the northwestern outlet through the Clearwater and Athabasca systems. There were several other low level outlets into the Lake Minong basin, including the Kaministiquia and the Lake Nipigon outlet. These allowed large amounts of water to flow from Lake Agassiz into Lake Minong. A series of ice advances and retreats between 10,500 and 9,500 YBP blocked the Lake Nipigon outlet and the other low level outlets, creating intermittent catastrophic outbursts of water into the Lake Minong basin.

These large inflows of water raised Lake Minong lake levels and flowed into Lake Algonquin in the Lake Michigan and Huron basins. These outbursts refilled the Lake Michigan and Huron basins, which are extreme low water levels of Lake Chippewa (Lake Michigan basin) and Lake Stanley (Lake Huron basin). This was due to isostatic rebound of the northern shorelines combined with the opening of the North Bay outlet of the Lake Huron basin. These repetitive outbursts from Lake Agassiz flooded the Lake Minong basin, then flowed over into the Lake Stanley basin, and then flowed through the North Bay drainage route into the Champlain Sea (present day St. Lawrence lowland). The shifting ice sheet created fluctuating drainage channels into the Lake Nipigon and Superior basins. A dozen beaches were created during short periods of stability. Towards the end of the Nipigon Phase, Lake Agassiz reached its largest geographical size as it joined with Lake Ojibway in the east.

=== Ojibway Phase: 9,160–8,480 YBP ===
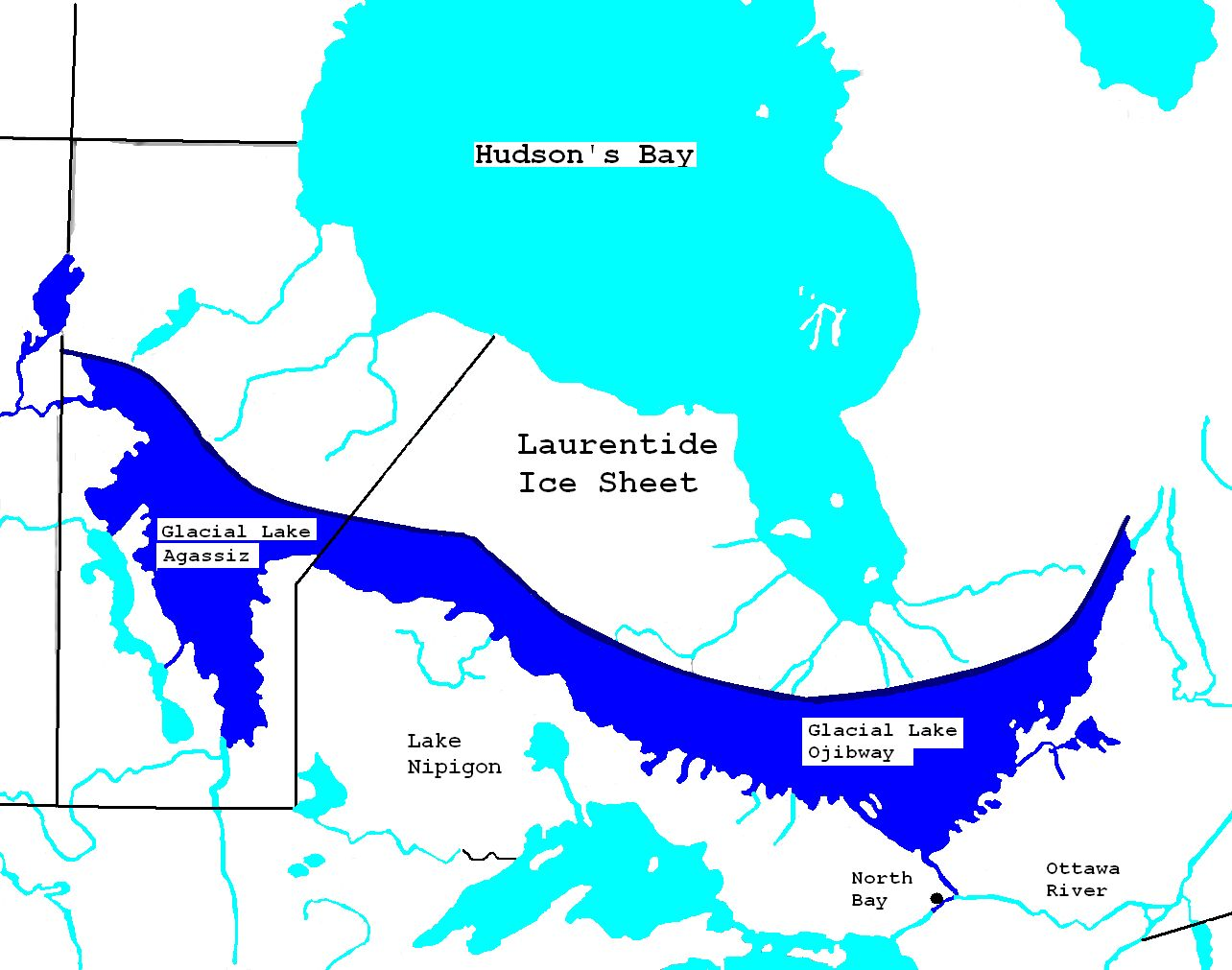
Map of Glacial Lake Agassiz and Lake Ojibway c. 7900 YBP. Designed from Teller and Leverington, 2004 (U.S. Geological Survey)

The Ojibway Phase is named for the glacial lake along the ice front in northern Ontario. Lake Ojibway merged with Lake Agassiz at this time. Isostatic rebound of glaciated lands that were south of the ice sheet created a long linear lake from the Saskatchewan–Manitoba border to Quebec. This long lake drained through the eastern outlet at Kinojevis River, into the Ottawa River valley. Lake Agassiz-Ojibway drainage raised sea levels. The results can be seen in Nova Scotia, New Brunswick, and eastern Maine. Marine records from the North Atlantic have identified two separate episodes, linked to northern hemisphere cooling in 8,490 YBP and 8,340–8,180 YBP. These may be linked with the Ojibway Phase of Lake Agassiz and may indicate large amounts of drainage from the Ottawa River valley and the Tyrrell Sea (ancestral Hudson Bay).

The Laurentide Ice Sheet continued to recede. Continued warming shrank the ice front towards present day Hudson Bay. Here, the Lake Agassiz northward outlet drained into the Tyrrell Sea. This breach dropped the water level below the eastern Kinojevis outlet. The drainage was followed by the disintegration of the adjacent ice front at about 8,480 YBP. This brought on the end of Lake Agassiz. The ice sheet continued its northward retreat to Baffin Island, leaving the North American mainland around 5,000 YBP.

== Lakes of the Lake Agassiz basin ==
Numerous lakes have formed in this glacial lake basin. The best known are the Great Lakes of Manitoba; Lake Winnipeg, Lake Manitoba, and Lake Winnipegosis. A cluster of smaller lakes surround these, including: Cedar Lake, through which the Saskatchewan River flows; Lake Dauphin, south of Lake Winnipegosis and tributary to it; and Lake St. Martin, on the Fairford or Little Saskatchewan River, the outlet of lakes Manitoba and Winnipegosis. In northern Minnesota, there are Roseau, Thief, Mud, and Maple lakes, besides three large lakes of that state, Rainy Lake, the Lake of the Woods, and Red Lake.

Lake	Length	Width	Area	Comments	Elevation (ASL)	Max. depth	Outlet
Lake Winnipeg	400 kilometres (250 miles)	The southern area is 40 km (25 mi) wide. The northern area is 97 km (60 mi) wide.	24,510 square kilometres (9,465 sq mi)	137 kilometres (85 mi) to a strait 3 to 6 kilometres (2 to 4 mi) wide, which extends 19 kilometres (12 mi) to Cape Dog. The narrowest is about 1.6 kilometres (1 mi) wide with five-sixths of the lake north of the cape, and one-sixth south.	216 metres (709 feet) above sea level.	Max. depth < 20 metres (65 ft). Much is 1.8–2.1 metres (5.9–6.9 ft) deep	Nelson River
Lake Manitoba	200 kilometres (120 mi)	45 kilometres (28 mi) (south end)	4,620 square kilometres (1,785 mi^{2})	Narrows to a strait of 3 kilometres (1.9 miles) width, becoming irregular to the north	247 metres (810 ft)	7 metres (23 ft)	Fairford River to Lake Winnipeg
Lake Winnipegosis	240 kilometres (150 mi) with the northern portion bent towards the west	8 to 24 kilometres (5.0 to 14.9 mi)	5,400 square kilometres (2,070 mi^{2})	Lies in the same valley as Lake Manitoba, parallel to Lake Winnipeg	254 metres (833 ft)	12 metres (39 ft)	Water Hen River and Lake to Lake Manitoba
Rainy Lake	80 kilometres (50 mi), with the northern portion bent towards the west	8 kilometres (5.0 mi)	930 square kilometres (360 mi^{2})	Numerous bays, narrows and islands.	340 metres (1,120 ft)	50 metres (160 ft)	Rainy River to Lake of the Woods
Lake of the Woods	100 kilometres (62 mi), with the northern portion bent towards the west	100 kilometres (62 mi)	4,350 square kilometres (1,679 mi^{2})	Irregularly shaped with a substantial peninsula on the west side	323 metres (1,060 ft)	64 metres (210 ft)	Winnipeg River to Lake Winnipeg
Red Lake	32 kilometres (20 mi) for each lobe with a total of 50 kilometres (31 mi) across both	16 kilometres (9.9 mi) for each lobe	1,110 square kilometres (427 mi^{2})	Divided into two equal areas by a strait 1,200 metres (3/4 of a mile) wide.	357 metres (1,171 ft)	25.6 metres (84 ft)	Red Lake River to the Red River of the North and Lake Winnipeg

== Glacial lakes draining into Lake Agassiz ==
Glacial Lake Souris formed along the Manitoba and North Dakota border, forming a crescent around the west side of the Turtle Mountains. Lake Souris had three successive outlets: the Sheyenne River, the Pembina River, and finally the Assiniboine River. Initially, Lake Souris' southern bay drained into the Sheyenne River, a tributary of the Red River, which in turn flowed into Lake Agassiz. However, after the ice sheet had retreated enough to uncover Turtle Mountain, the northern bay of Lake Souris found an outlet at the "elbow" of the modern Souris River; the elbow is about 18 miles (29 km) southwest of the present mouth of the Souris River. From this elbow, the lake's waters flowed southeast and entered the Pembina River, now a tributary of the Red River, and the Pembina, in turn, entered Lake Agassiz at its Assiniboine embayment. When the ice sheet retreated north of the Assiniboine River, Lake Souris drained via that river into Lake Agassiz. (Pelican Lake in Langs Valley of Manitoba occupies what was once the northern shore of Lake Souris.)

The lower part of the Saskatchewan River basin near the river's mouth at Cedar Lake was clear of the ice-sheet before Lake Agassiz began to drain to northeast. Lake Saskatchewan existed on about 135 miles (217 km) of the North Saskatchewan River between Saskatoon and Prince Albert, Saskatchewan. A few miles east of Lake Saskatchewan's outlet, near the modern junction of the north and south branches, it entered Lake Agassiz. This Saskatchewan embayment extended for 400 miles (640 km) along the modern Saskatchewan River route.

== Formation of beaches ==
Raised beaches, many kilometres from any current water, mark the former boundaries of the lake. While the Red River gradually descends from south to north, these old strandlines ascend as one goes north, due to isostatic rebound since glaciation.

=== When Lake Agassiz outflowed to the south ===
The highest shore of Lake Agassiz is called the Herman Beach. It is named for Herman, Minnesota, in Grant County. The Herman Beach is the highest shoreline and can be traced from the historic outlet at Lake Traverse on the border of Minnesota and South Dakota. The beach fluctuates between 973 and 976 feet (296.5 and 297.5 m) above sea level. The altitude of Lake Traverse at 971 feet (296 m) above sea level at the Traverse Gap at Brown's Valley is at 980 feet (300 m). This was the south outlet of Lake Agassiz.

The Herman Beach displays numerous deltas from the major rivers that entered Lake Agassiz. In Minnesota and North Dakota, these include the Buffalo River Delta, Sand Hill River Delta, Sheyenne River Delta, Elk Valley Delta, and the Pembina River Delta. In Manitoba, there is the Assiniboine River Delta.

- Beaches of the Norcross stages: The Norcross shoreline lies near the Herman shore on the slope of eroded till.
- Beaches of the Tintah Stage: The Tintah beaches are 1,040 to 1,055 feet (317 to 322 m) above sea level.
- Beaches of the Campbell Stage: These have a well developed profile and are useful in establishing the boundary of the lake when it ceased to flow south into the River Warren.
- Beaches of the McCauleyville Stage: The channel of the River Warren, flowing out of Lake Agassiz, eroded the channel below the level of Traverse Lake and Big Stone Lake, down to 935 feet (285 m), the deepest part of Lake Traverse. The southern portions of the McCauleyville shoreline coincides with the levels of high and low water in Lake Traverse, which are 976 to 970 feet (297 to 296 m) above sea level.

=== When Lake Agassiz outflowed to the northeast ===
Fourteen shorelines of Lake Agassiz have been identified, which lie below the McCauleyville beaches. These formed when the River Warren could no longer receive the outflow of the lake. This occurred when a lower outlet was found and the lake shrank with the release of the lake's waters. The three highest shorelines are named the Blanchard beaches, and the next five in descending order are the Hillsboro, the two Emerado, and the two Ojata beaches, from towns on or near their course in North Dakota.

- Beaches of the Blanchard Stage (Hillsboro Beach): Three successive levels of the lake pass near Blanchard, North Dakota. They are indicated by sand and gravel deposits 5 to 7 miles (8.0 to 11.3 km) southeast of Euclid, Minnesota., and near Midway station, Manitoba The next lower beach is called the Hillsboro Beach and is visible near Glyndon, Minnesota, and 5 to 15 miles (8.0 to 24.1 km) north of Crookston, Minnesota.
- Beaches of the Emerado Stage: The Emerado shoreline is approximately 885 feet (270 m) above sea level. Its southern tip is across the Red River between Kragnes, Minnesota, and Harwood, North Dakota. This single shoreline, clearly shows that it belongs to a period when the lake flowed northeastward to its outlet. Crustal rebound was greater to the north, where the Emerado Beach, in Manitoba, is 10 to 20 feet (3.0 to 6.1 m) higher.
- Beaches of the Ojata Stage: The upper Ojata shoreline is between 870 and 875 feet (265 and 267 m) above sea level near Perley, Minnesota, and Noble, North Dakota. In Minnesota it is 2 to 6 miles (3.2 to 9.7 km) east of the Red River. Some of the shore is marked by a beach ridge, especially to the north, where the surface is till.
- Gladstone Beach: The southern tip of Lake Agassiz when Gladstone beach formed is near Belmont, North Dakota, 20 metres (0.020 km) south of Grand Forks, it lies 845 feet (258 m) above sea level. It runs northward about 10 miles (16 km) east of the Red River.
- Burnside Beach: The Burnside Beach crosses the Red River at Grand Forks, North Dakota, and to the northeast, then north, paralleling the Red River 10 to 13 metres (0.010 to 0.013 km) to the east. This beach is indistinct south of the international border. The beach lies 835 to 840 feet (255 to 256 m) above sea level.
- Ossowa Beach: The Ossowa Beach lies only a few miles south of the international boundary. The beach lies 815 to 820 feet (248 to 250 m) above sea level.
- Stonewall Beach: In Stonewall, Manitoba, there is a conspicuous beach ridge 0.33 miles (0.53 km) or more. Its crest is 820 to 825 feet (250 to 251 m) above sea level and about 10 feet (3.0 m) deep. Beach deposits belonging to this stage were not observed elsewhere in southern Manitoba. It is believed that they are buried for most of their length from the U.S. side of the border, north to Winnipeg
- Beaches of the Niverville Stage: About 0.5 miles (0.8 km) southeast of Niverville the road crosses this beach. Its crest is 777 to 778 feet (237 to 237 m) above sea level. It stands 4 feet (1.2 m) above the surrounding surface. Beginning near Niverville station, it extends southeasterly at least a mile. About 0.33 miles (0.53 km) south, a similar beach ridge crest is at 780 feet (240 m) above sea level. It rises 2 to 4 feet (0.61 to 1.22 m) above the land. Much of it sloughs, with water throughout the year, the elevation of the beach crest is 782 to 784 feet (238 to 239 m) above sea level.

== Soils ==
The fertile soils of the Red River Valley, now drained by the Red River of the North, were formed from lacustrine deposits of silt from Lake Agassiz.

== See also ==
- Glacial history of Minnesota
- Glacial lake outburst flood
- Lake Algonquin
- Lake Chicago
- Lake Maumee
- Lake McConnell
- List of prehistoric lakes

== Sources ==
- Fisher, Timothy G. (December 2004). "River Warren boulders, Minnesota, USA: catastrophic paleoflow indicators in the southern spillway of glacial Lake Agassiz". Boreas. 33 (4): 349–58. Bibcode:2004Borea..33..349F. doi:10.1111/j.1502-3885.2004.tb01245.x. ISSN 0300-9483.
- Hostetler, S. W.; et al. (2000). "Simulated influences of Lake Agassiz on the climate of central North America 11,000 years ago". Nature. 405 (6784): 334–337. Bibcode:2000Natur.405..334H. doi:10.1038/35012581. PMID 10830959. S2CID 205006564.
- Lusardi, B. A. (1997). "Quaternary Glacial Geology" (PDF). Minnesota at a Glance. Minnesota Geological Survey, University of Minnesota. Archived from the original (PDF) on 28 September 2007.
- Michalek, Michael J. (2013). "Examining the progression and termination of Lake Agassiz" (PDF). Michigan State University. Archived from the original (PDF) on 5 May 2014.
- Pielou, E. C. (1991). After the Ice Age: The Return of Life to Glaciated North America, Chicago: University of Chicago Press, ISBN 0-226-66812-6
- Thorleifson, L.H. (1996). "Review of Lake Agassiz History", Sedimentology, Geomorphology, and History of the Central Lake Agassiz Basin, Geological Association of Canada Field Trip Guidebook for GAC/MAC Joint Annual Meeting, pp. 55–84.
- Upham, Warren (1895). "The Glacial Lake Agassiz". Monographs of the United States Geological Survey. XXV. Archived from the original on 20 May 2021. Archived at: Wayback Machine
- "Valley Formation". Fact Sheets. Minnesota River Basin Data Center (MRBDC, Minnesota State University, Mankato. 15 November 2004.
