= Minnesota State Highway 117 =

State highway in Minnesota, United States

Trunk Highway 117
- MN 117 highlighted in red

Route information
- Maintained by MnDOT
- Length: 1.797 mi (2.892 km)
- Existed: April 22, 1933–present

Major junctions
- West end: CR 19 at Minnesota-South Dakota state line
- East end: MN 27 in Lake Valley Township

Location
- Country: United States
- State: Minnesota
- Counties: Traverse

Highway system
- Minnesota Trunk Highway System; Interstate; US; State; Legislative; Scenic
← MN 115	→ MN 119

Minnesota State Highway 117 (MN 117) is a short 1.797-mile-long (2.892 km) highway in west central Minnesota, which runs from Roberts County Road 19 at the South Dakota state line and continues east to its eastern terminus at its intersection with MN 27 near Wheaton. MN 117 passes through Lake Valley Township.

== Route description ==
Highway 117 serves as a short east–west connector route between Lake Traverse at the Minnesota / South Dakota state line and Minnesota State Highway 27.

The route is legally defined as Route 191 in the Minnesota Statutes. It is not marked with this number.

== History ==
Highway 117 was authorized in 1933.

The route was paved by 1942.

== Major intersections ==
The entire route is in Lake Valley Township, Traverse County.

mi	km	Destinations	Notes
0.000	0.000	CR 19 – Rosholt	Western terminus; Continuation beyond South Dakota state line
0.016	0.026	Lake Traverse	
1.688– 1.720	2.717– 2.768	Mustinka River	
1.797	2.892	MN 27 – Browns Valley, Wheaton	Eastern terminus
1.000 mi = 1.609 km; 1.000 km = 0.621 mi
