= Minnesota State Highway 236 =

State highway in Minnesota, United States

Trunk Highway 236
- MN 236 highlighted in red

Route information
- Maintained by MnDOT
- Length: 4.022 mi (6.473 km)
- Existed: 1949–1985

Major junctions
- West end: Bois de Sioux River
- East end: US 75 in Monson Township

Location
- Country: United States
- State: Minnesota
- Counties: Traverse

Highway system
- Minnesota Trunk Highway System; Interstate; US; State; Legislative; Scenic
← MN 235	→ MN 237

Minnesota State Highway 236 was a short 4.022-mile-long (6.473 km) highway in Traverse County. It connected U.S. Route 75 to a local road in South Dakota that leads to U.S. Route 81. The route was decommissioned in 1985 and is now Traverse County State-Aid Highway 10.

== Route description ==
State Highway 236 served as an east-west route crossing the Bois de Sioux River and, with another road in South Dakota, provided a connector route between U.S. Route 75 and U.S. Route 81. The entire route was located in Monson Township.

== History ==
Highway 236 was authorized in 1949.

It was removed in 1985 and became Traverse County State-Aid Highway 10.

== Major intersections ==
The entire highway was in Monson Township, Traverse County.

mi	km	Destinations	Notes
0.000	0.000	105th Street west – Rosholt	Western terminus; roadway continued west as 105th Street
1.025	1.650	CSAH 9 – Wheaton	
4.022	6.473	US 75 / CR 86 east (690th Street)	Eastern terminus; roadway continued east as CR 86/690th Street
1.000 mi = 1.609 km; 1.000 km = 0.621 mi
