= May 2022 Midwest derecho =

Derecho in May 2022

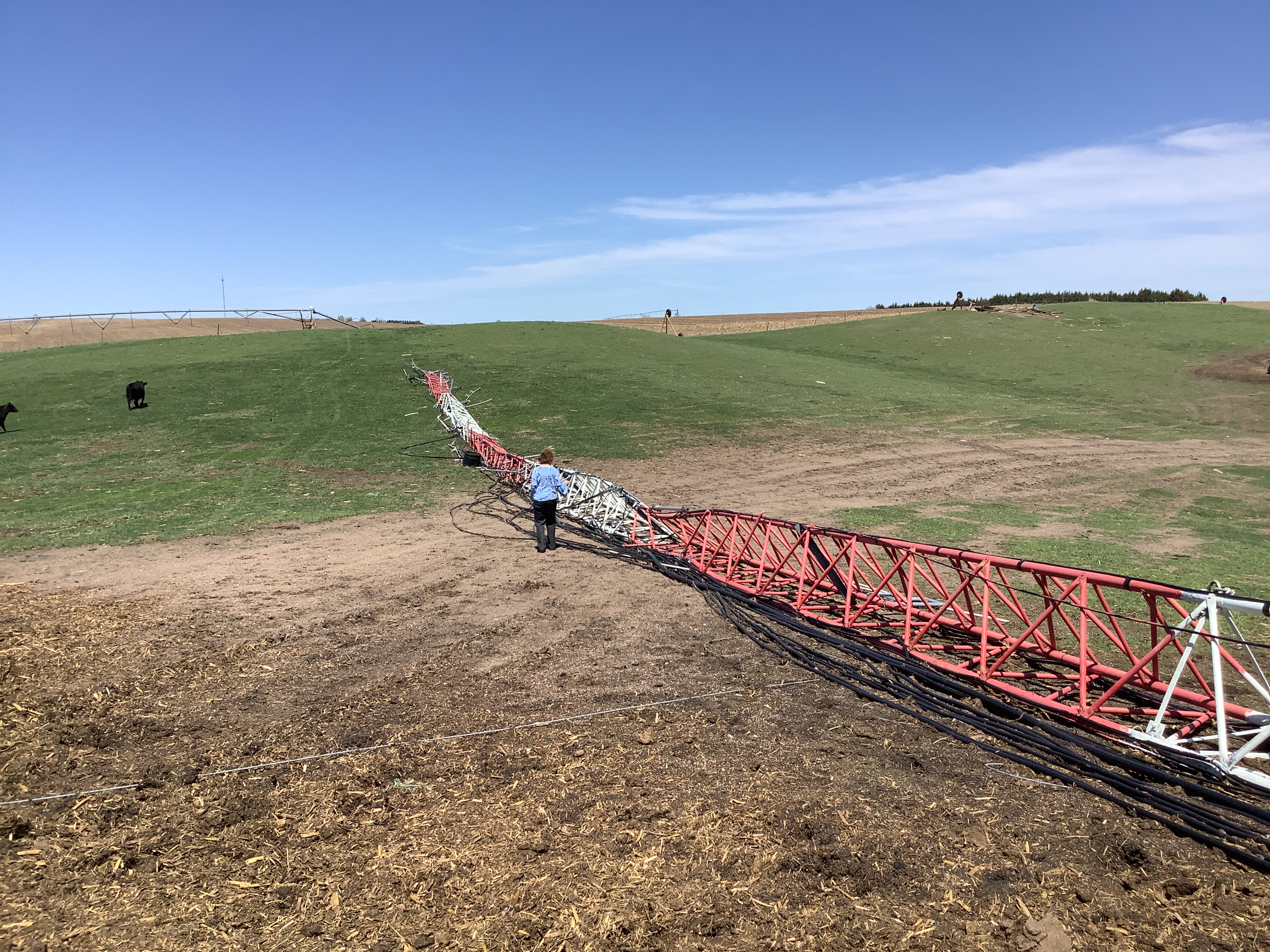
- A cell tower that was blown over in Hartington, Nebraska.

Meteorological history
- Formed: May 12, 2022

Tornado outbreak
- Tornadoes: 32
- Max. rating: EF2 tornado
- Highest gusts: 135 mph (217 km/h) (tornadic); 107 mph (172 km/h) (non-tornadic)

Overall effects
- Casualties: 5 fatalities, 13+ injuries
- Damage: $1.3 billion (2022 USD)
- Areas affected: Midwestern United States
- Power outages: >200,000

On May 12, 2022, a severe squall line followed by a derecho took place across the Midwestern United States. Two fatalities occurred from the first line of storms while three more deaths occurred from the derecho itself.

== Meteorological synopsis ==
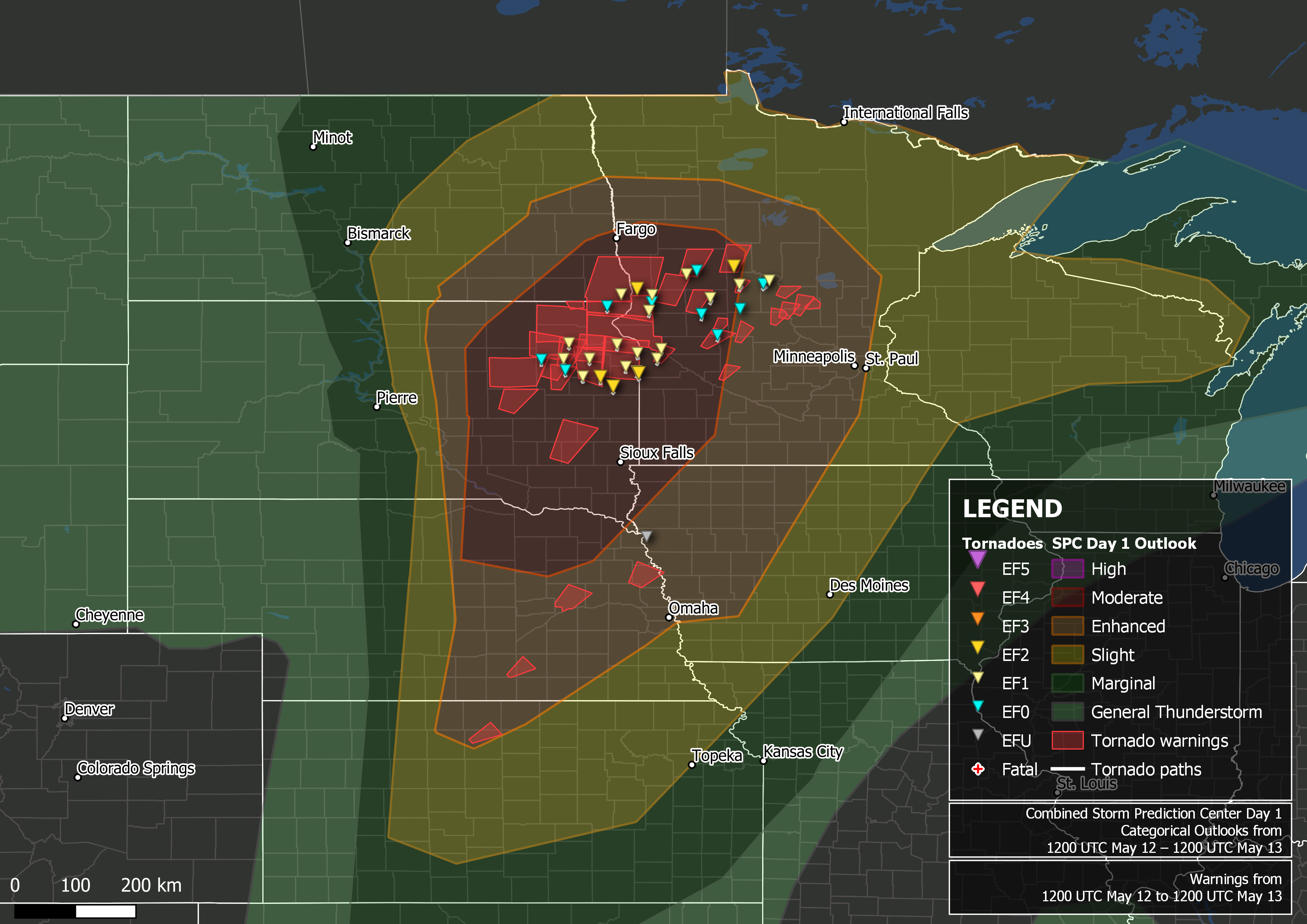
Map of tornado warnings and confirmed tornadoes from the derecho.

In the leadup to the derecho, temperatures were very warm. Sioux Falls, South Dakota saw a high of 94 °F (34 °C). Temperatures in the 90s helped fuel the severe weather that later erupted over the Great Plains. On May 10, 2022, the Storm Prediction Center noted the elevated probabilities for severe weather to materialize, as atmospheric conditions over western Minnesota, northwestern Iowa, northeastern Nebraska, eastern South Dakota, and southeastern North Dakota were favorable for thunderstorms to develop. The development of a mid-level shortwave trough in this area, combined with the arrival of a cold front over a low-pressure area in the vicinity of the Dakotas, prompted the issuance of a Day 3 enhanced risk over the area, with a large 30% hatched area (indicating a ≥10% chance of significant severe weather) for severe weather to develop. The next day, the SPC maintained the enhanced risk for the same general areas of the upper Great Plains, but introduced a large 30% area for damaging winds, alongside a smaller 45% corridor for destructive winds over southwestern Minnesota, eastern South Dakota, and extreme northwestern Iowa. A 10%, unhatched area for tornadoes (indicating a <10% chance of EF2 or stronger tornadoes) was also included in the outlook, placed over northeastern South Dakota, southeastern North Dakota, and west-central Minnesota. While the outlook favored a more linear mode composed of a long squall line, the possibilities for individual supercell thunderstorms was also discussed.

As the day of the event arrived, the SPC maintained the enhanced risk for the same general areas as the overall expected scenario, but part of the 45% wind risk area was hatched at the 1300 UTC outlook, requiring the issuance of a moderate risk in its 1300 UTC outlook centered in west-central Minnesota, eastern South Dakota, and extreme southeastern North Dakota. At 1525 UTC, the SPC issued a PDS Severe Thunderstorm Watch for a prolific wind event with hazards of winds expected of 105 MPH. By 1630 UTC, the SPC slightly expanded the moderate risk area to encompass more area of east-central South Dakota. The outlook also introduced a small 10% hatched corridor for tornadoes, noting the possibilities for a few strong tornadoes to occur ahead of the main line. 3500–4500 J/kg CAPE values placed themselves over the area of concern, alongside 300–500 m^{2}/s^{2} helicity and 45–55-kt wind shear, hence the increase for tornado potential. However, the main risk continued to be severe wind.

As the evening advanced, the forecasted severe line of thunderstorms developed in the central Great Plains, eventually advancing towards the greatest area of concern. As such, hundreds of wind reports were received by the SPC over the course of the day, some discussing wind gusts of up to 105 miles per hour (169 km/h), as was the case in Tripp, South Dakota. Multiple reports of fatalities were received, as the damaging winds claimed at least three lives throughout the Plains. At least three people were killed by the storms. While the event was primarily dominated by the severe derecho that developed, multiple tornadoes were also reported, mainly in South Dakota and Minnesota. A brief but high-end EF2 tornado caused severe damage in the town of Gary, South Dakota, while a long-tracked EF2 tornado impacted Wadena County, Minnesota, causing damage to vehicles and barns along its track.

== Impact ==
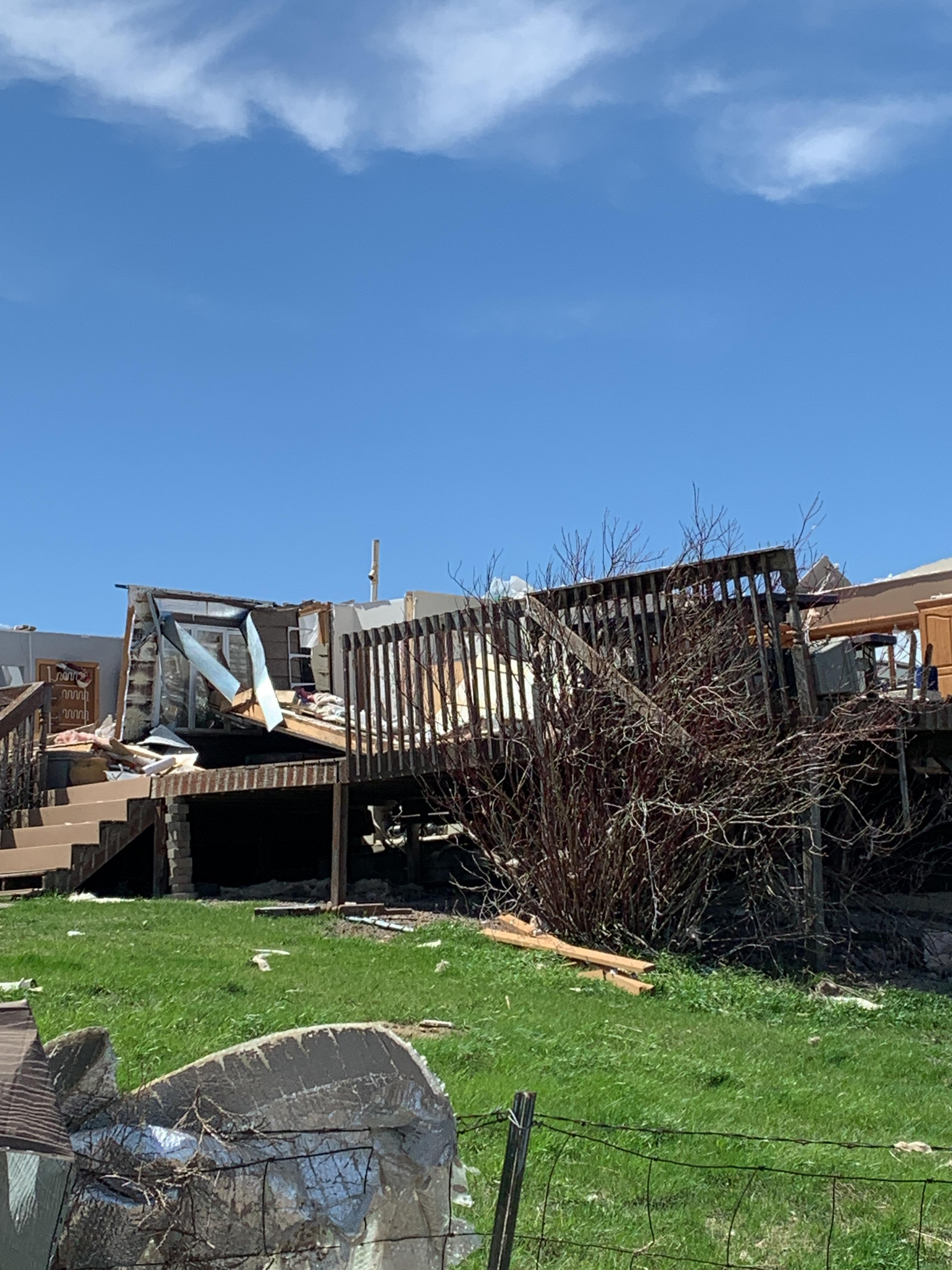
EF2 tornado damage to a home south of Gary, South Dakota.

The derecho affected portions of northeastern Iowa, Minnesota, Nebraska, southeastern North Dakota, and South Dakota. Its strong winds lofted and accumulated a thick cloud of dust, resulting in a haboob that accompanied the derecho. South Dakota governor Kristi Noem reported that 28 counties in the state sustained damage, with the severity of the effects leading to a declaration of a state of emergency. A wind gust of 107 mph (172 km/h) was measured near Tripp, South Dakota. In Madison, South Dakota, wind gusts topped out at 97 mph (156 km/h). At least three people were killed by the storms. Two people in Minnehaha County, including one in Sioux Falls, were killed by flying debris from the storm. Another person was killed in Kandiyohi County, Minnesota, after a grain bin was thrown onto a vehicle by strong winds. Severe weather suspended a baseball game between the Minneapolis Twins and Houston Astros. With 68 hurricane-force wind gusts, this broke the record from December 15, 2021, for the most hurricane-force wind gusts in a derecho. Portions of I-29 and I-90 closed.

== Confirmed tornadoes ==
Confirmed tornadoes by Enhanced Fujita rating
EFU	EF0	EF1	EF2	EF3	EF4	EF5	Total
1	9	17	5	0	0	0	32

=== May 12 event ===
List of confirmed tornadoes – Thursday, May 12, 2022 (Note: All dates are based on the local time zone where the tornado touched down; however, all times are in Coordinated Universal Time for consistency.)
EF#	Location	County / Parish	State	Start Coord.	Time (UTC)	Path length	Max width
EF2	E of Estelline	Deuel	SD	44.5731°N 96.8389°W	22:39–22:40	0.44 mi (0.71 km)	40 yd (37 m)
EF2	The roof was ripped off a large and well-built dairy barn, a camper was tipped over, and several outbuildings were damaged or destroyed.						
EF1	WSW of Thomas	Hamlin	SD	44.7388°N 97.2897°W	22:40–22:41	0.52 mi (0.84 km)	20 yd (18 m)
EF1	A brief tornado impacted a residence while the family was outside, forcing them to seek shelter under a tractor, resulting in one injury. A newly built machine shed had its roof completely removed and exterior walls damaged. Debris from the structure was scattered into trees, and the tops of trees were snapped off.						
EF0	NNW of Naples	Clark	SD	44.8322°N 97.5491°W	22:45–22:46	0.32 mi (0.51 km)	10 yd (9.1 m)
EF0	A barn lost half of its roof, with debris scattered 0.3 miles (0.48 km) away. Large tree branches were snapped as well.						
EF2	Castlewood	Hamlin	SD	44.717°N 97.0279°W	22:45–22:49	1.96 mi (3.15 km)	80 yd (73 m)
EF2	A strong rope tornado caused severe damage in Castlewood, where multiple homes sustained partial to total roof loss, and a few sustained some collapse of exterior walls. A small and poorly anchored funeral home visitation center was blown off its foundation and destroyed, along with several sheds and detached garages. A school building had a large section of its roof blown off and sustained some damage to the upper portions of its brick exterior walls. A school bus shed was also destroyed, and many trees and power poles were snapped in town. Some outbuildings were damaged and hay bales were tossed outside of town as well. One person was injured.						
EF0	NNE of Raymond	Clark	SD	44.99°N 97.9055°W	22:45	0.02 mi (0.032 km)	10 yd (9.1 m)
EF0	An eyewitness reported a brief tornado. No damage occurred.						
EF2	S of Gary	Deuel	SD	44.7733°N 96.4598°W	22:58–23:00	0.43 mi (0.69 km)	60 yd (55 m)
EF2	A brief but strong high-end EF2 tornado struck a farm, ripping the entire roof off a house and destroying most of its exterior walls. An occupant was injured when a refrigerator fell into the basement. The home's attached garage was blown off its foundation, and a pickup truck was pushed at least 6 feet (1.8 m). The family's dog was blown out of the house but survived with only minor injuries. Nearby outbuildings were damaged, and debris was scattered through a field and impaled into the ground. A semi-truck was rotated and flipped onto its side, and trees were also damaged.						
EF1	NNW of Gary	Deuel	SD	44.8163°N 96.4886°W	22:59–23:03	2.05 mi (3.30 km)	10 yd (9.1 m)
EF1	A barn roof was damaged, and a horse trailer was rolled multiple times at a farm. At a second residence, a tree fell on to the corner of the house and an anchor-bolted single stall garage was overturned, while a second garage to the north lost two thirds of its roof panels. Another machine shed had a portion of the south wall pushed in, and a mostly empty grain bin was also ripped from its foundation and tossed across a road.						
EF1	WNW of Rauville	Codington	SD	45.0048°N 97.1902°W	23:02–23:03	0.2 mi (0.32 km)	50 yd (46 m)
EF1	A house had its attached garage and part of its roof torn off. An outbuilding was destroyed, with debris scattered at least 0.5 miles (0.80 km) away.						
EF1	N of Garden City	Clark	SD	45.0011°N 97.5774°W	23:02–23:03	0.49 mi (0.79 km)	20 yd (18 m)
EF1	A tornado touched down on a farm, where a barn lost a majority of its roof and external walls. Some wooden 2x4s from the structure were impaled into the ground, and one pierced through the attached garage of a house. Some sheet metal was wrapped around trees, and debris was tossed about 0.25 miles (0.40 km) from where it originated.						
EF1	E of Tunerville	Deuel	SD	44.8841°N 96.652°W	23:05–23:07	0.24 mi (0.39 km)	50 yd (46 m)
EF1	A tornado impacted a hunting lodge property, damaging corn, trees, and the main lodge house which lost half of its roof. A camper was picked up and dropped on its roof as well.						
EF1	Madison	Lac qui Parle	MN	45.0059°N 96.1859°W	23:09–23:11	0.89 mi (1.43 km)	50 yd (46 m)
EF1	A house had its roof removed, other homes in Madison sustained more minor damage, a camper was rolled, and three light poles were bent over at a baseball field, including one that had its cement support ripped out of the ground. There was also extensive tree damage throughout the town as well.						
EF1	S of Webster	Day	SD	45.2348°N 97.4948°W	23:13–23:14	0.12 mi (0.19 km)	35 yd (32 m)
EF1	An outbuilding had its roof ripped off and interior wall knocked over, with debris was tossed over 250 yards (230 m) away. A calving shed was rolled, an animal trailer was tipped over, and a windmill was overturned and twisted.						
EF1	NW of Nassau	Grant	SD	45.0884°N 96.4798°W	23:15–23:16	0.55 mi (0.89 km)	20 yd (18 m)
EF1	A machine shed shop was badly damaged along with two sheds on a property.						
EF1	N of Twin Brooks	Grant	SD	45.2177°N 96.7813°W	23:19–23:21	1.3 mi (2.1 km)	10 yd (9.1 m)
EF1	A calf shed was tossed, a stave silo was moved off its foundation, and a pole barn was severely damaged; its west wall was collapsed, and the south wall pushed in. A wooden grain bin was pushed 300 feet (91 m), and two empty grain bins were destroyed and tossed. A cattle trailer was pushed about 100 feet (30 m) and rolled into a creek.						
EF1	E of Louisburg	Lac qui Parle	MN	45.1481°N 96.1252°W	23:19–23:21	1.08 mi (1.74 km)	50 yd (46 m)
EF1	A house had its roof blown off and sustained damage to its front exterior wall. Debris was scattered into a field, and trees were snapped.						
EF0	WNW of Sunburg	Swift	MN	45.3534°N 95.2893°W	23:50–23:52	2.03 mi (3.27 km)	50 yd (46 m)
EF0	Several trees were uprooted or snapped. Tin was peeled off of sides and roofs of outbuildings. Trailers were tipped and various farm equipment were heavily damaged. Some large trees branches were blown away.						
EF1	E of Dumont	Traverse	MN	45.7151°N 96.3072°W	23:51–23:53	1.81 mi (2.91 km)	20 yd (18 m)
EF1	An outbuilding was heavily damaged, with its debris being scattered 0.25 miles (0.40 km) away. Several large, well-anchored, and mostly empty grain bins were destroyed, with their debris tossed into nearby trees.						
EF0	S of New Effington	Roberts	SD	45.783°N 96.9281°W	23:52–23:53	0.33 mi (0.53 km)	10 yd (9.1 m)
EF0	Eyewitnesses reported a brief tornado. No damage occurred.						
EF0	S of Lowry	Pope	MN	45.6663°N 95.5279°W	23:52–23:54	1.92 mi (3.09 km)	25 yd (23 m)
EF0	About two dozen trees were uprooted or broken. A metal shed was also destroyed.						
EF0	SSE of Charlesville	Traverse	MN	45.843°N 96.2661°W	23:59–00:03	4.41 mi (7.10 km)	20 yd (18 m)
EF0	Several trees were uprooted, outbuildings were severely damaged, and two homes had portions of their garage roofs ripped off. Silos were damaged as well.						
EFU	S of Sergeant Bluff	Woodbury	IA	42.3592°N 96.3417°W	00:01–00:02	0.08 mi (0.13 km)	50 yd (46 m)
EFU	A video showed a brief tornado crossing I-29 but no damage was found.						
EF1	E of Charlesville	Grant	MN	45.95°N 96.26°W	00:07–00:10	2.94 mi (4.73 km)	50 yd (46 m)
EF1	Several tree limbs were broken, two wooden power poles were cracked, and two others were left leaning.						
EF1	W of Le Mars	Richland	ND	45.96°N 96.72°W	00:10–00:13	3.39 mi (5.46 km)	150 yd (140 m)
EF1	Several tree branches were snapped. Two wooden power poles were cracked, and two others were left leaning.						
EF1	Northwestern Alexandria to Lake Carlos	Douglas	MN	45.9062°N 95.3967°W	00:12–00:14	2.52 mi (4.06 km)	200 yd (180 m)
EF1	A high-end EF1 tornado touched down in the northern part of Alexandria, causing considerable damage in a residential area. A couple of homes had partial to total roof loss, while several others sustained less intense damage to roofing, siding, and windows. Sheds and detached garages were destroyed, and many trees were snapped or uprooted. Less intense tree and roof damage occurred at Lake Carlos before the tornado dissipated.						
EF2	SW of Tenney to NNE of Campbell	Wilkin	MN	46.0263°N 96.483°W	00:16–00:25	9.77 mi (15.72 km)	100 yd (91 m)
EF2	At least 23 power poles were cracked or snapped, and numerous large trees were snapped or uprooted in and around Campbell as well. Garage doors were blown in, and large steel grain bins at a grain elevator in town were partially caved in.						
EF0	NE of Sauk Centre	Stearns	MN	45.7447°N 94.9528°W	00:17–00:18	1.34 mi (2.16 km)	25 yd (23 m)
EF0	Over a dozen trees were uprooted or snapped.						
EF1	W of Battle Lake	Otter Tail	MN	46.26°N 95.75°W	00:31–00:34	3.60 mi (5.79 km)	100 yd (91 m)
EF1	A single-wide manufactured home was flipped, metal roofing was ripped from a storage building, and numerous trees were snapped or uprooted along the path.						
EF1	Clarissa	Todd	MN	46.1046°N 94.9627°W	00:33–00:36	3.28 mi (5.28 km)	100 yd (91 m)
EF1	Hundreds of trees were snapped or uprooted. Several outbuildings lost roofs.						
EF0	NNE of Clitherall	Otter Tail	MN	46.3123°N 95.5963°W	00:40–00:41	0.92 mi (1.48 km)	50 yd (46 m)
EF0	A waterspout began over West Mason Lake and moved onshore, snapping several tree branches.						
EF0	Cushing	Morrison	MN	46.1159°N 94.6098°W	00:46–00:48	2.87 mi (4.62 km)	50 yd (46 m)
EF0	A tornado uprooted hundreds of trees and tore the roofs off two buildings in Cushing.						
EF2	SW of Verndale to ESE of Sebeka	Todd, Wadena	MN	46.3581°N 95.0453°W	00:50–01:11	18.20 mi (29.29 km)	500 yd (460 m)
EF2	A low-end EF2 tornado snapped numerous power poles and large trees in Verndale and Blue Grass, some of which landed on and caused significant damage to homes and vehicles. Numerous farm buildings had their steel roofing and wall panels ripped off. Turkey barns and other metal buildings lost portions of their roofs as well.						
EF1	NE of Cushing	Morrison	MN	46.1664°N 94.5196°W	00:51–00:54	3.59 mi (5.78 km)	100 yd (91 m)
EF1	Hundreds of trees were uprooted along the path.						

== See also ==
- List of North American tornadoes and tornado outbreaks
- Weather of 2022
- List of derecho events
