= Dakomin, Minnesota =

Dakomin
- Unincorporated community
- Location within Minnesota Location within the United States
- Coordinates: 45°43′30″N 96°40′19″W
- Country: United States
- State: Minnesota
- County: Traverse
- Elevation: 981 ft (299 m)
- Time zone: UTC-6 (Central (CST))
  - Summer (DST): UTC-5 (CDT)
- Area code: 320
- GNIS feature ID: 654663

Dakomin is an unincorporated community in Windsor Township, Traverse County, Minnesota, United States. Its name is a portmanteau of "Dakota" and "Minnesota" and it is located on Lake Traverse south of the tripoint of Minnesota and the Dakotas.
