= Twelvemile Creek (Mustinka River tributary) =

Coordinates: 45.88885°N 96.36229°W

Location
- Country: United States

Physical characteristics
- Source
  - location: Minnesota
- Basin size: Mustinka River

Twelvemile Creek is a 55.1-mile-long (88.7 km) tributary of the Mustinka River of Minnesota in the United States. It rises in Stevens County and flows northwest before joining the Mustinka in Traverse County. Via the Mustinka and Bois de Sioux rivers, the Red River of the North, Lake Winnipeg, and the Nelson River, it is part of the Hudson Bay watershed.

== See also ==
- List of rivers of Minnesota
