= Boisberg, Minnesota =

Boisberg
- Unincorporated community
- Location within Minnesota Location within the United States
- Coordinates: 45°55′13″N 96°33′41″W
- Country: United States
- State: Minnesota
- County: Traverse
- Elevation: 984 ft (300 m)
- Time zone: UTC-6 (Central (CST))
  - Summer (DST): UTC-5 (CDT)
- Area code: 320
- GNIS feature ID: 654610

Boisberg is an unincorporated community in Monson Township, Traverse County, in the U.S. state of Minnesota.

== History ==
Boisberg derives its name from the nearby Bois de Sioux River.
