= Tintah =

Tintah can refer to a location in the United States:

- The city of Tintah, Minnesota
- Tintah Township, Traverse County, Minnesota
