= Larson's Hunters Resort =

- U.S. National Register of Historic Places
- U.S. Historic district
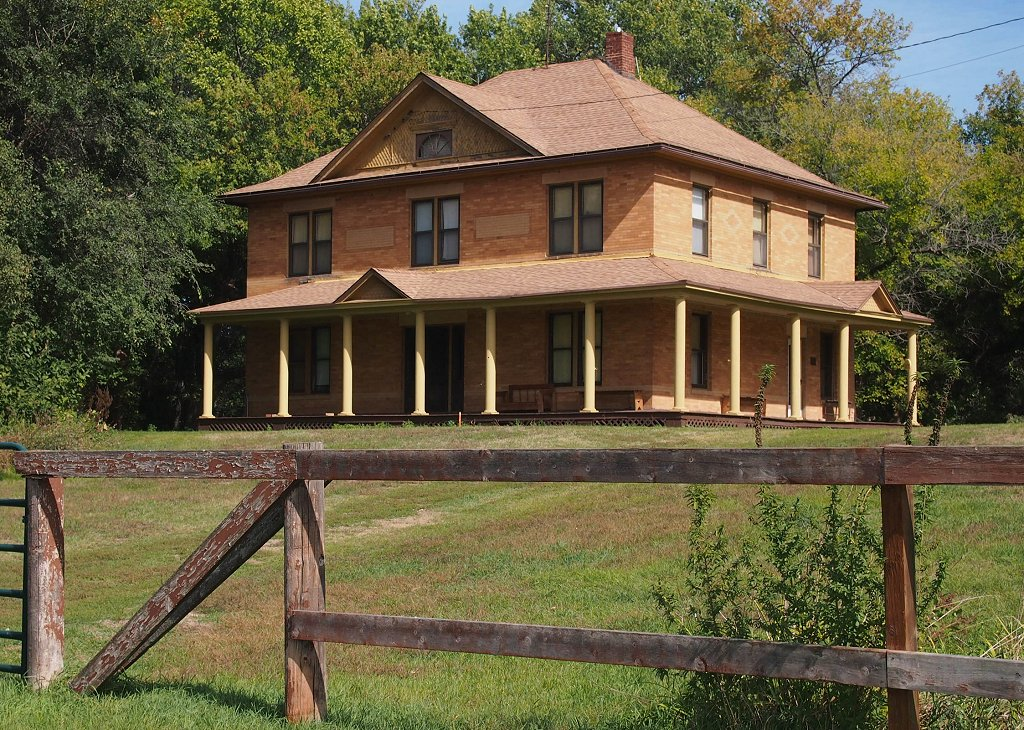
- The Larson's Hunters Resort lodge from the southwest

- Location within Minnesota Location within the United States
- Location: County Highway 76, Lake Valley Township, Minnesota
- Coordinates: 45°49′29″N 96°34′21″W
- Area: 4 acres (1.6 ha)
- Built: 1901
- Built by: Alfred Setterlund
- NRHP reference No.: 85001774
- Designated HD: August 15, 1985

Larson's Hunters Resort is a historic former hunting resort in Lake Valley Township, Minnesota, United States. It was in operation from the 1890s to the 1960s and became the best-known hunting resort in Traverse County, while also being maintained as an active farm. Larson's Hunters Resort was listed on the National Register of Historic Places in 1985 for having local significance in the themes of architecture and commerce. As a historic district it consists of a prominent brick farmhouse/lodge built in 1901 and eight outbuildings. It was nominated for exemplifying the important hunting industry in west-central Minnesota and the phenomenon of farmer/resort owners, while the main building was further noted as the largest and most intact farmhouse in Traverse County, and one of the few constructed of brick.

== Description ==
Larson's Hunters Resort is an approximately four-acre (1.6 ha) property on the east shore of Mud Lake. The farmhouse is a 2 1/2-story building of smooth, light-brown brick on a boulder foundation. It has a hip roof with a projecting gable on the west façade. A long porch with Tuscan order columns supporting a hipped roof wraps around the west and south façades. There are smooth limestone window sills and lintels, and some simple decorative patterns in the brickwork. The interior has oak woodwork and 14 rooms.

At the time of the property's nomination to the National Register, eight additional buildings remained from the farm/resort era. Five were rental cabins for hunters and the other three were agricultural buildings. Three of the cabins stood north of the farmhouse amid a stand of trees. The largest was built in the early 20th century near the lakeshore and moved later; another was built around 1940. Southeast of the farmhouse was the Larsons' original 1891 house, which upon the completion of the larger building in 1901 was converted to a granary, then later moved and used as a wash house, then a wood shed, then converted to a guest cabin in the 1930s. Nearby was a two-car garage built around 1920 whose south wing, initially an ice house, was converted to a cabin around 1941. On the west side of the property, separated from the other buildings by a road, is a granary built around 1928. It stands one-and-a-half stories and has shiplap siding. A hog barn built nearby in the early twentieth century was later moved south of the garage, where it was used as a chicken coop and then a boathouse. Next to that was a small, early-20th-century shed. A barn and machine shed were built on the west side of the property in the 1890s but were later demolished.

== History ==
Andrew Larson (1853–1921) and his wife Bertha (1859–1941) were Swedish immigrants who bought this property in 1890. They settled close to other relatives who had preceded them to Traverse County. The Larsons initially lived in a dugout until they completed a wood-frame farmhouse the next year. They established a grain, cattle, and hog farm and expanded into three adjacent lots by 1904.

Western Minnesota, with its prairies, sloughs, rivers, and lakes, supported bountiful populations of waterfowl and upland game birds, and the Red River of the North marked a significant migratory flyway. Railway access was established in the 1870s and the region took off as a recreational hunting destination. Thousands of sportsmen from Minneapolis–Saint Paul and other parts of Minnesota arrived in season, often in special rail cars or train excursions catering to hunters with their cargos of guns and dogs. Hotels in Western Minnesota towns welcomed the influx, setting up cots in the hallways after the rooms were all full. Local farmers quickly recognized a need for additional accommodations and an opportunity to supplement their incomes. Many farm families arranged to pick up guests at the train station and bring them back to their property by wagon, where they were provided with beds, breakfast and dinner at the farmhouse, and a boxed lunch. Some even hired themselves out as guides or porters. Most of this commerce was fairly informal, but a few families parlayed this practice into a full-fledged business.

Andrew and Bertha Larson were among this number. They had begun hosting hunters in the late 1890s, but in 1901 they invested fully in the enterprise. They hired Alfred Setterlund, an architect and contractor in nearby Wheaton, Minnesota, to build a bigger farmhouse. Setterlund, a Swedish immigrant who had arrived in Wheaton in 1885, designed a farmhouse/lodge with eight guest rooms, a large kitchen, a dining room, and a library. For the walls, he used brick manufactured in St. Louis, shipped by rail to Herman, Minnesota, and carried to the Larsons' farm in wagons. Soon, with additional cabins and even space on the lawn for hunters who brought their own tents, Larsons' Hunters Resort could accommodate up to 50 or 60 paying guests at a time. It also provided homemade boats with flat bottoms suitable for use on the shallow lake.

Traverse County, on the divide between the Red River and the Minnesota River, was one of the top hunting destinations in western Minnesota, and Larsons' Hunters Resort was one of its best-known resorts. Some of the most enthusiastic hunters stayed in the area for weeks, bagging thousands of birds. Although Minnesota began enacting state game laws and hunting limits in the late 19th century, the infrastructure to enforce them was slow in coming. Andrew Larson died in 1921 and ownership passed to son Edward and his wife Mabel. The decades of barely restrained hunting eventually took their toll, however, and the area's game bird populations declined precipitously in the 1950s and 60s. Edward and Mabel Larson closed the resort business in the 1960s, though the property remained in the family until 1979.

== See also ==
- National Register of Historic Places listings in Traverse County, Minnesota
