= Leonardsville =

Leonardsville may refer to:

- Leonardsville Township, Minnesota
- Leonardville, New Jersey
- Leonardsville, New York
