= Collis, Minnesota =

Collis
- Unincorporated community
- Location within Minnesota Location within the United States
- Coordinates: 45°38′48″N 96°25′32″W
- Country: United States
- State: Minnesota
- County: Traverse
- Elevation: 1,066 ft (325 m)
- Time zone: UTC-6 (Central (CST))
  - Summer (DST): UTC-5 (CDT)
- Area code: 320
- GNIS feature ID: 654650

Collis is an unincorporated community in Tara Township, Traverse County, in the U.S. state of Minnesota.

== History ==
A post office called Collis was established in 1885, and remained in operation until 1954. The community was named after the Hill of Tara, collis meaning "hill" in Latin.
