= Wheaton station (Minnesota) =

Chicago, Milwaukee & St. Paul Railroad depot built 1906

Wheaton
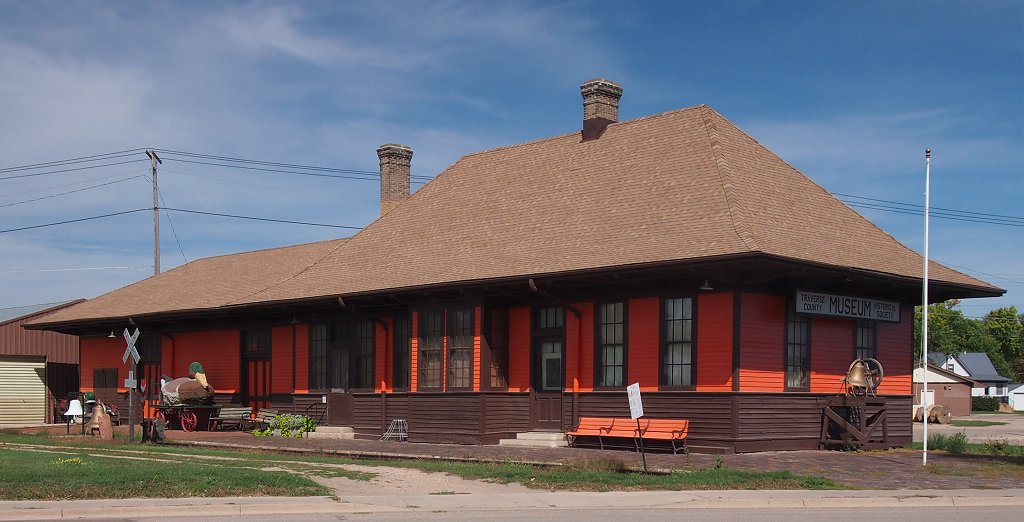
- The Wheaton Depot from the south

General information
- Location: 1201 Broadway, Wheaton, Minnesota 56296
- System: Former Milwaukee Road passenger rail station

History
- Opened: 1884; 142 years ago
- Rebuilt: 1906; 120 years ago

Services
Preceding station	Milwaukee Road	Following station
White Rock toward Fargo	Fargo – Ortonville	Dumont toward Ortonville
- Chicago, Milwaukee and St. Paul Depot
- U.S. National Register of Historic Places
- Location within Minnesota Location within the United States
- Location: 1201 Broadway Avenue, Wheaton, Minnesota
- Coordinates: 45°48′16.5″N 96°30′0.5″W
- Area: Less than one acre
- Built: c. 1906
- Architect: Chicago, Milwaukee & St. Paul Railroad
- NRHP reference No.: 85001818
- Designated: August 23, 1985
Location

The Wheaton Depot is a former train station in Wheaton, Minnesota, United States, built circa 1906 to handle both passengers and freight. It was built by the Chicago, Milwaukee & St. Paul Railroad (the Milwaukee Road for short) to replace an 1885 depot that had burned down, and remained in service until 1976. It was listed on the National Register of Historic Places in 1985 as the Chicago, Milwaukee and St. Paul Depot for having local significance in the themes of architecture and transportation. It was nominated for being a well-preserved example of an early-20th-century combination depot built on a standard design, and for being the best symbol of the railroad's crucial impact on the community.

Since 1977 the depot has served as a museum operated by the Traverse County Historical Society.

== Description ==
The Wheaton Depot is a long, one-story, wood-frame building. It has clapboard siding and six-over-six sash windows. The hip roof has wide eaves with exposed rafters. The southwest façade, which faced the tracks, has a bay window, two passenger doors with transom windows, and two large freight doors.

The interior of the depot follows a standard design. One end (the northwest) contains the freight room while the other consists of separate men's and women's waiting rooms divided by an office.

== History ==
Wheaton was founded in 1884 on a railroad line that had been built north from Ortonville, Minnesota, by the Fargo and Southern Railway. The following year the company was acquired by the Milwaukee Road, which immediately built a station in the nascent town. That building was Wheaton's main connection to the wider world for 21 years, but in March 1906 it caught fire and burned down.

The Milwaukee Road built a replacement on the same site. It may have been designed by J. U. Nettenstrom, who was the company's architect at the time. Certainly it was based on a standard design used for many of the Milwaukee Road's stations in mid-sized towns at the turn of the 20th century. A standard design was useful both in keeping costs down and in providing consistency along the rail line.

Before the era of automobiles and highways, the depot was the gateway into and out of Wheaton. Virtually all travelers funneled through the depot. It was also where freight arrived and local agricultural produce was sent to market. The mail came and left by train, and the depot housed the local telegraph office. The railroad and the station that symbolizes it played a crucial role in Wheaton's growth, which soon became the county seat and a regional trade center.

At its peak the Wheaton Depot received four trains daily. As automobiles became more common in the 1930s passenger service was dropped. Freight service continued until 1976, when the Milwaukee Road closed the station for good. The following year the Traverse County Historical Society purchased the building and restored it as a county history museum. The railroad removed its tracks in 1980. In 1984 the historical society constructed an annex to the depot consisting of a metal pole framed building extending to the northwest.

== See also ==
- List of museums in Minnesota
- National Register of Historic Places listings in Traverse County, Minnesota
