= Norcross, Minnesota =

City in Minnesota, United States

- City
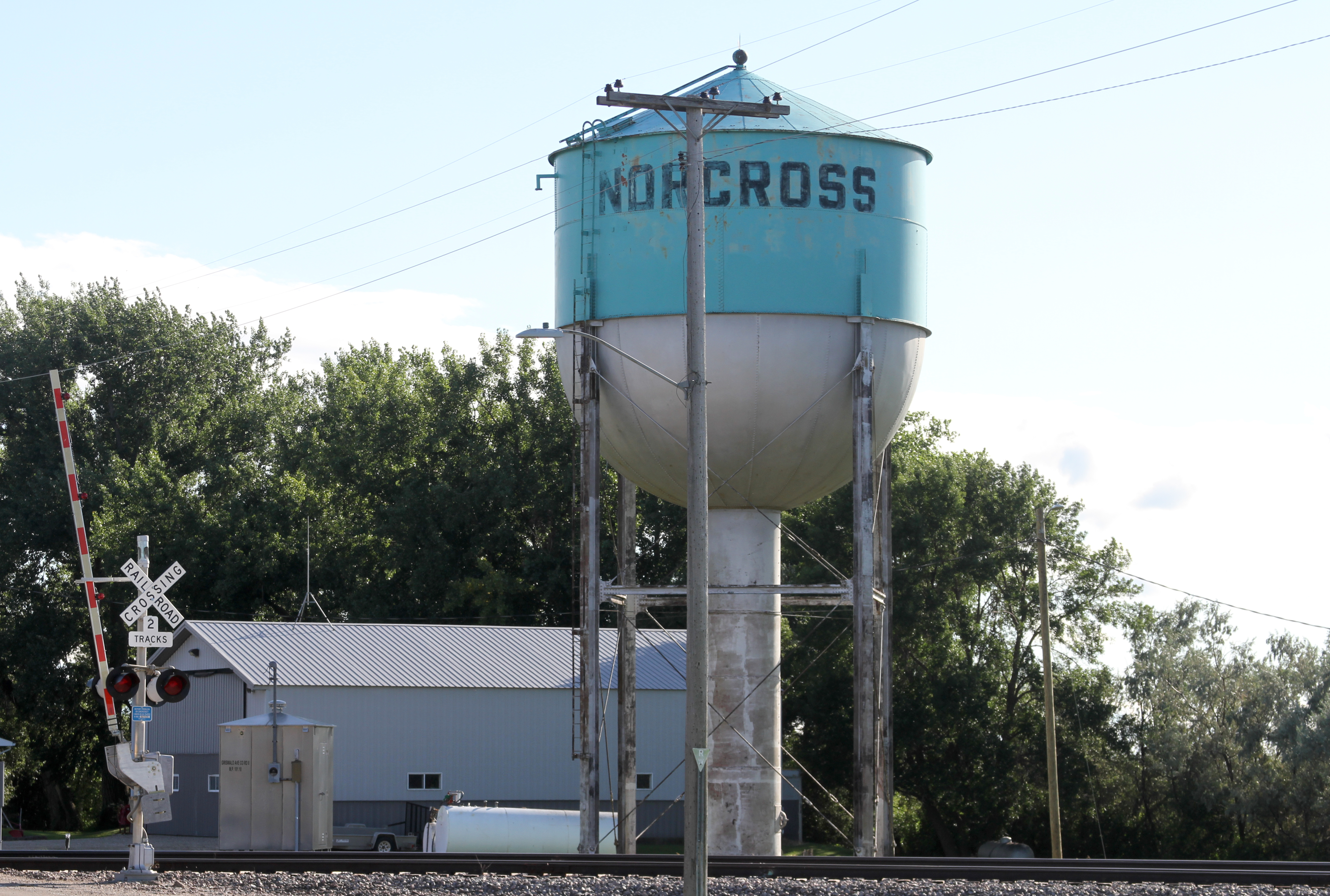
- Water tower at railroad crossing

- Location of Norcross, Minnesota
- Coordinates: 45°52′7″N 96°11′40″W
- Country: United States
- State: Minnesota
- County: Grant
- Platted: December 1881
- Incorporated: February 20, 1904

Government
  - Mayor: Robert Schmidt

Area
  - Total: 1.558 sq mi (4.034 km^{2})
  - Land: 1.558 sq mi (4.034 km^{2})
  - Water: 0 sq mi (0.000 km^{2})
- Elevation: 1,040 ft (317 m)

Population (2020)
  - Total: 52
  - Estimate (2022): 52
  - Density: 33.4/sq mi (12.89/km^{2})
- Time zone: UTC−6 (Central (CST))
  - Summer (DST): UTC−5 (CDT)
- ZIP Code: 56274
- Area code: 320
- FIPS code: 27-46492
- GNIS feature ID: 0648581
- Sales tax: 6.875%

Norcross is a city in Grant County, Minnesota, United States, along the Mustinka River. The population was 52 at the 2020 census.

== History ==
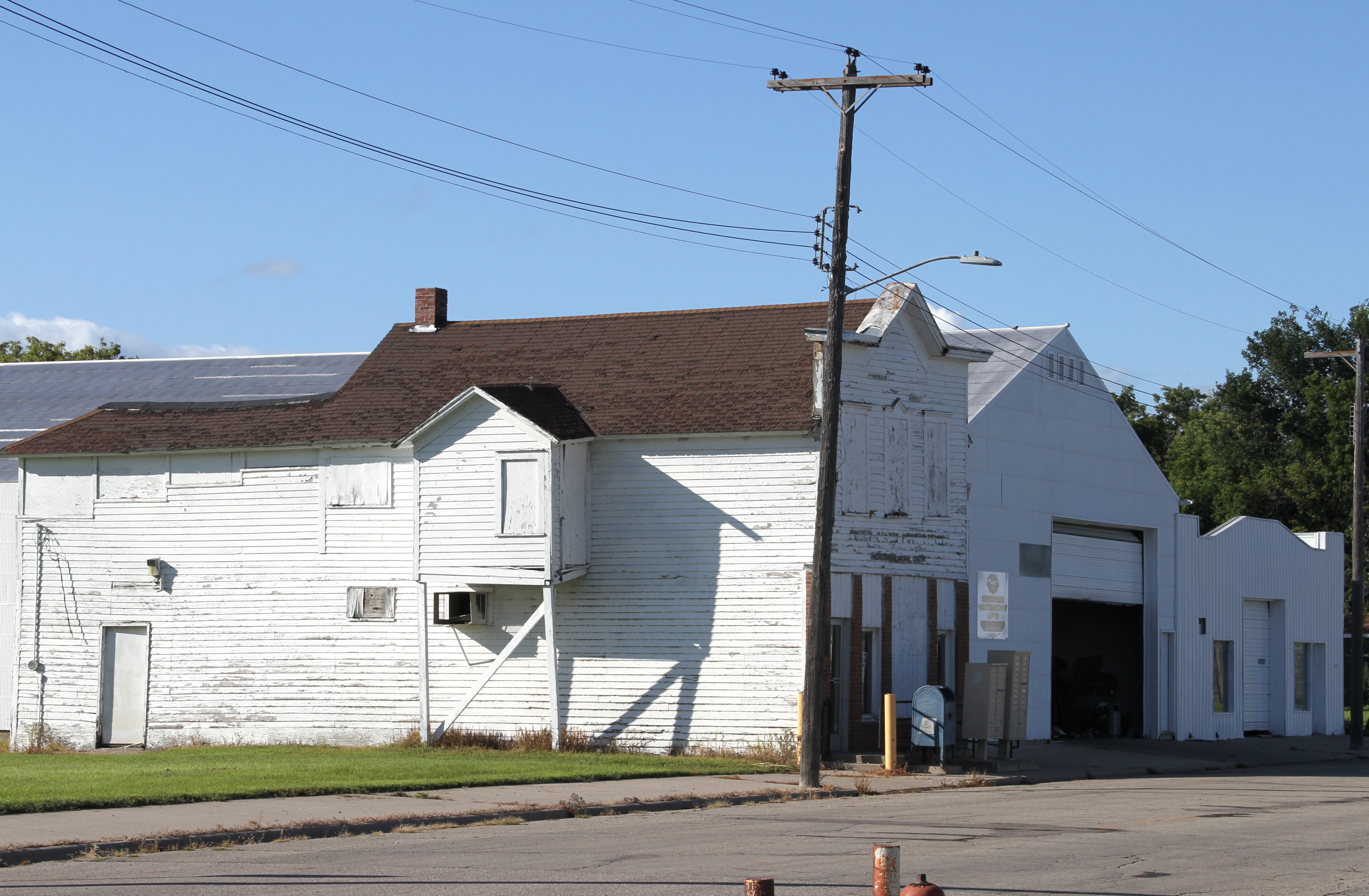
Former Post Office

Norcross was platted in 1881. In 1882, Norcross began as a large grain ranch owned by N.F. Griswold and Captain J.N. Cross. They convinced the Great Northern Railway to build the depot at their ranch rather than two miles north at the planned town of Gorton. The train regularly stopped at the ranch to pick up wheat, and the railroad officials agreed to build the depot and grain elevators there. Why the name Norcross instead of Griscross? The two gentlemen and an old army career man, called Norton, donated the land for the town. Norton and Cross teamed up for the city name, Norcross, and Griswold settled for main street, known as "Griswold Ave." The city's name is an amalgamation of Henry Allyn Norton and Judson Newell Cross, the founders.

The town incorporated in 1913 with 140 people. Lund and Sellseth started a bank in 1909, which closed in 1931, a victim of the Depression. The first school, named "New School," opened in 1903, and later was home to the Norwegian Lutheran Church when a newer school was built. In 1928, a great fire destroyed all the buildings on the south side of town. Refusing to give in to the forces of nature, the citizens opened a creamery, the town hall, and a liquor store, which later was converted to a pool hall during Prohibition. George Houps for Iowa bought the stockyards and started a general store.

At one time Norcross had three churches. Our Savior's Lutheran Church celebrated their 75th anniversary in 1976 and their 90th anniversary in 1991, and is now a beautiful private home. Before the church was built, early pioneers walked 17 miles to a church northeast of Norcross in order to be confirmed. St. Mary's Catholic Church opened in 1905 and closed in 1923. The Faith United Methodist Church began services in the Amundson School in 1919, erected a church in 1952, and closed in 2007.

American Legion Hillestad-Borgeson Post #410, based in Norcross, established a veterans' memorial in Norcross Park on Highway 9. The monument erected by the post is dedicated "In memory of all the men and women who have served their country in all wars." A National Guardsman and 2005 veteran of the war in Iraq, Norcross native Jacob Veldhouse's name is inscribed there, as is the name of his uncle, Dennis.

The Norcross Town Hall, built in the late '20s, was the place to be when growing up in Norcross. People danced, roller skated, attended funerals and wedding receptions, hosted church fundraiser dinners, and even basketball games. The brick building fell into disrepair and was dismantled in 1997. Bricks were offered free to the public.

A post office started operation at Norcross since 1881. The United States Postal Service suspended the post office to be relocated to the post office in Herman in October 2019.

The Norcross school building is a worthy candidate for the National Register of Historic Places. Built in 1938 by the WPA, the building is made entirely of poured concrete, a fine example of Art Deco architecture. For over thirty years, students from first through seventh grade were educated in the three-room school. The school consolidated with Herman in 1971, and now the building is privately owned.

== Geography ==
According to the United States Census Bureau, the city has a total area of 1.558 square miles (4.04 km^{2}), all land.

Minnesota State Highway 9 serves as a main route in the community.

== Demographics ==
Historical population
Census	Pop.	Note	%±
1910	177		—
1920	195		10.2%
1930	163		−16.4%
1940	180		10.4%
1950	179		−0.6%
1960	153		−14.5%
1970	137		−10.5%
1980	124		−9.5%
1990	86		−30.6%
2000	59		−31.4%
2010	70		18.6%
2020	52		−25.7%
2022 (est.)	52		0.0%
U.S. Decennial Census; 2020 Census

=== 2010 census ===
As of the 2010 census, there were 70 people, 29 households, and 20 families living in the city. The population density was 44.9 inhabitants per square mile (17.3/km^{2}). There were 39 housing units at an average density of 25.0 per square mile (9.7/km^{2}). The racial makeup of the city was 74.3% White, 1.4% Native American, 20.0% from other races, and 4.3% from two or more races. Hispanic or Latino of any race were 25.7% of the population.

There were 29 households, of which 27.6% had children under the age of 18 living with them, 58.6% were married couples living together, 10.3% had a female householder with no husband present, and 31.0% were non-families. 31.0% of all households were made up of individuals, and 13.8% had someone living alone who was 65 years of age or older. The average household size was 2.41 and the average family size was 3.05.

The median age in the city was 41.5 years. 28.6% of residents were under the age of 18; 2.8% were between the ages of 18 and 24; 21.4% were from 25 to 44; 25.8% were from 45 to 64; and 21.4% were 65 years of age or older. The gender makeup of the city was 37.1% male and 62.9% female.

=== 2000 census ===
As of the 2000 census, there were 59 people, 33 households, and 19 families living in the city. The population density was 37.7 inhabitants per square mile (14.6/km^{2}). There were 40 housing units at an average density of 25.5 per square mile (9.8/km^{2}). The racial makeup of the city was 100.00% White.

There were 33 households, out of which 21.2% had children under the age of 18 living with them, 48.5% were married couples living together, 9.1% had a female householder with no husband present, and 39.4% were non-families. 39.4% of all households were made up of individuals, and 27.3% had someone living alone who was 65 years of age or older. The average household size was 1.79 and the average family size was 2.30.

In the city, the population was spread out, with 13.6% under the age of 18, 5.1% from 18 to 24, 13.6% from 25 to 44, 35.6% from 45 to 64, and 32.2% who were 65 years of age or older. The median age was 53 years. For every 100 females, there were 84.4 males. For every 100 females age 18 and over, there were 104.0 males.

The median income for a household in the city was $11,875, and the median income for a family was $34,375. Males had a median income of $52,500 versus $18,750 for females. The per capita income for the city was $14,507. There were 23.5% of families and 24.1% of the population living below the poverty line, including 50.0% of under eighteens and 15.0% of those over 64.
