= Dick Bremer =

American sports broadcaster

- Born: March 1, 1956 (age 70); Saint Paul, Minnesota, U.S.
- Occupation: Sportscaster
- Years active: 1983–2023
- Sports commentary career
- Team: Minnesota Twins
- Genre: Play-by-play announcer
- Sport: Baseball

Dick Bremer (born March 1, 1956) is a retired sports broadcaster for Bally Sports North. He was the lead television announcer for the Minnesota Twins from 1983 until his retirement after the 2023 season. He has also called Minnesota Golden Gophers men's basketball and Minnesota Golden Gophers football and hockey. He previously called Iowa Hawkeyes men's basketball and Minnesota North Stars games during his tenure. He partnered up with Justin Morneau, LaTroy Hawkins, Roy Smalley or Glen Perkins for the Minnesota Twins television broadcasts. His longtime broadcast partner was Bert Blyleven.

== Biography ==
Bremer was born in St. Paul, Minnesota. Raised in the small town of Dumont, Minnesota in Traverse County, Bremer was a graduate of Staples High School in Staples, Minnesota. He graduated from St. Cloud State University in St. Cloud, Minnesota in 1978.

Before his broadcasting career, Bremer was a Disc Jockey for KCLD (St. Cloud). His nickname was "Duke in the Dark". In 1983 he began broadcasting games for the Twins for Spectrum Sports. This was the second year of the Metrodome's existence. Bremer called games on Fox Saturday Baseball with Mitch Williams in some games involving the Twins.

Bremer also took part in a Charter Communications commercial promoting watching football in High Definition.

Bremer and his wife Heidi live in St. Michael, Minnesota. They have a son and daughter, Erik and Hannah. Erik is, like his father, also a sportscaster. Bremer's father was a Lutheran Church–Missouri Synod pastor and Bremer has done public speaking at churches across the Midwest talking about his faith. He is a devout Lutheran.

On September 29, 2013, Bremer was inducted into the Minnesota Broadcasting Hall of Fame recognizing, among other things, his 30 seasons as the "Television Voice of the Minnesota Twins".

On October 31, 2023, Bremer announced his retirement from broadcasting. He was named Special Assistant to the Front Office and team ambassador following his retirement. The Twins dedicated the home television broadcast booth to Bremer, naming it the "Dick Bremer Broadcast Booth".
