= Walls Township, Traverse County, Minnesota =

Township in Minnesota, United States

Walls Township, Minnesota
- Township
- Location within the state of Minnesota Walls Township, Minnesota (the United States)
- Coordinates: 45°43′24″N 96°35′1″W
- Country: United States
- State: Minnesota
- County: Traverse

Area
  - Total: 36.3 sq mi (94.1 km^{2})
  - Land: 36.1 sq mi (93.5 km^{2})
  - Water: 0.23 sq mi (0.6 km^{2})
- Elevation: 1,080 ft (330 m)

Population (2000)
  - Total: 81
  - Density: 2.3/sq mi (0.9/km^{2})
- Time zone: UTC-6 (Central (CST))
  - Summer (DST): UTC-5 (CDT)
- FIPS code: 27-67828
- GNIS feature ID: 0665901

Walls Township is a township in Traverse County, Minnesota, United States. The population was 81 at the 2000 census.

Walls Township was organized in 1881, and named for three of the Walls brothers who settled there.

== Geography ==
According to the United States Census Bureau, the township has a total area of 36.3 square miles (94.1 km^{2}), of which 36.1 square miles (93.5 km^{2}) is land and 0.2 square mile (0.6 km^{2}) (0.61%) is water.

== Demographics ==
As of the census of 2000, there were 81 people, 28 households, and 22 families residing in the township. The population density was 2.2 people per square mile (0.9/km^{2}). There were 32 housing units at an average density of 0.9/sq mi (0.3/km^{2}). The racial makeup of the township was 100.00% White.

There were 28 households, out of which 39.3% had children under the age of 18 living with them, 78.6% were married couples living together, 3.6% had a female householder with no husband present, and 17.9% were non-families. 10.7% of all households were made up of individuals, and 7.1% had someone living alone who was 65 years of age or older. The average household size was 2.89 and the average family size was 3.22.

In the township the population was spread out, with 30.9% under the age of 18, 7.4% from 18 to 24, 24.7% from 25 to 44, 19.8% from 45 to 64, and 17.3% who were 65 years of age or older. The median age was 40 years. For every 100 females, there were 92.9 males. For every 100 females age 18 and over, there were 107.4 males.

The median income for a household in the township was $50,000, and the median income for a family was $50,000. Males had a median income of $35,833 versus $23,750 for females. The per capita income for the township was $16,820. None of the population and none of the families were below the poverty line.
