= Dumont, Minnesota =

City in Minnesota, United States

- City
- Location of Dumont, Minnesota
- Coordinates: 45°43′5″N 96°25′25″W
- Country: United States
- State: Minnesota
- County: Traverse
- Platted: April 1, 1885
- Incorporated: May 3, 1898

Government
  - Mayor: Don Montonye

Area
  - Total: 0.430 sq mi (1.114 km^{2})
  - Land: 0.430 sq mi (1.114 km^{2})
  - Water: 0 sq mi (0.000 km^{2})
- Elevation: 1,043 ft (318 m)

Population (2020)
  - Total: 75
  - Estimate (2022): 76
  - Density: 174.3/sq mi (67.29/km^{2})
- Time zone: UTC−6 (Central (CST))
  - Summer (DST): UTC−5 (CDT)
- ZIP Code: 56236
- Area code: 320
- FIPS code: 27-17090
- GNIS feature ID: 0642974
- Sales tax: 6.875%

Dumont (/ˈduːmɒnt/ DOO-mont) is a city in Traverse County, Minnesota, United States. The population was 75 at the 2020 census.

== History ==
A post office called Dumont has been in operation since 1886.

On June 22, 1919, at 6:30 pm there was a deadly tornado that killed one person, Nicholas Didlo, age 63. There was a total of $100,000 in property loss. The tornado came from the southeast side of the village leaving any warning for people to go into their cellars. Dumont was named by railroad officials.

== Geography ==
According to the United States Census Bureau, the city has a total area of 0.430 square miles (1.11 km^{2}), all land.

U.S. Route 75 serves as a main route in the community.

A 4.1 magnitude earthquake shook Dumont on June 4, 1993. The quake was felt across and area of 27,000 square miles and originated 6.2 miles below the surface of the earth. The quake is sometimes named after the nearby town of Wheaton.

== Demographics ==
Historical population
Census	Pop.	Note	%±
1900	236		—
1910	188		−20.3%
1920	210		11.7%
1930	186		−11.4%
1940	238		28.0%
1950	223		−6.3%
1960	226		1.3%
1970	204		−9.7%
1980	173		−15.2%
1990	126		−27.2%
2000	122		−3.2%
2010	100		−18.0%
2020	75		−25.0%
2022 (est.)	76		1.3%
U.S. Decennial Census; 2020 Census

=== 2010 census ===
As of the 2010 census, there were 100 people, 50 households, and 32 families living in the city. The population density was 222.2 inhabitants per square mile (85.8/km^{2}). There were 54 housing units at an average density of 120.0 per square mile (46.3/km^{2}). The racial makeup of the city was 99.0% White and 1.0% from two or more races. Hispanic or Latino of any race were 3.0% of the population.

There were 50 households, of which 24.0% had children under the age of 18 living with them, 54.0% were married couples living together, 8.0% had a female householder with no husband present, 2.0% had a male householder with no wife present, and 36.0% were non-families. 32.0% of all households were made up of individuals, and 14% had someone living alone who was 65 years of age or older. The average household size was 2.00 and the average family size was 2.41.

The median age in the city was 49 years. 16% of residents were under the age of 18; 4% were between the ages of 18 and 24; 24% were from 25 to 44; 31% were from 45 to 64; and 25% were 65 years of age or older. The gender makeup of the city was 51.0% male and 49.0% female.

=== 2000 census ===
As of the 2000 census, there were 122 people, 51 households, and 32 families living in the city. The population density was 281.4 inhabitants per square mile (108.6/km^{2}). There were 57 housing units at an average density of 131.5 per square mile (50.8/km^{2}). The racial makeup of the city was 100.00% White.

There were 51 households, out of which 33.3% had children under the age of 18 living with them, 62.7% were married couples living together, and 35.3% were non-families. 33.3% of all households were made up of individuals, and 17.6% had someone living alone who was 65 years of age or older. The average household size was 2.39 and the average family size was 3.12.

In the city, the population was spread out, with 28.7% under the age of 18, 2.5% from 18 to 24, 28.7% from 25 to 44, 18.9% from 45 to 64, and 21.3% who were 65 years of age or older. The median age was 36 years. For every 100 females, there were 117.9 males. For every 100 females age 18 and over, there were 123.1 males.

The median income for a household in the city was $28,750, and the median income for a family was $36,250. Males had a median income of $56,875 versus $11,250 for females. The per capita income for the city was $23,118. There were 18.8% of families and 20.8% of the population living below the poverty line, including 45.5% of under eighteens and none of those over 64.

== Notable Citizens ==
Famous sportscaster Dick Bremer grew up in Dumont, MN later moving to Staples, MN where he graduated from high school.
