= Charlesville, Minnesota =

Unincorporated community in Minnesota, United States

Charlesville
- Unincorporated community
- Location within Minnesota Location within the United States
- Coordinates: 45°56′57″N 96°16′07″W
- Country: United States
- State: Minnesota
- Counties: Traverse, Grant
- Elevation: 1,014 ft (309 m)
- Time zone: UTC-6 (Central (CST))
  - Summer (DST): UTC-5 (CDT)
- Area code: 320
- GNIS feature ID: 654641

Charlesville is an unincorporated community in Tintah Township, Traverse County, and North Ottawa Township, Grant County in the U.S. state of Minnesota.
