= Dollymount Township, Traverse County, Minnesota =

Township in Minnesota, United States

Dollymount Township, Minnesota
- Township
- Location within the state of Minnesota Dollymount Township, Minnesota (the United States)
- Coordinates: 45°42′32″N 96°18′21″W
- Country: United States
- State: Minnesota
- County: Traverse

Area
  - Total: 38.4 sq mi (99.4 km^{2})
  - Land: 38.4 sq mi (99.4 km^{2})
  - Water: 0 sq mi (0.0 km^{2})
- Elevation: 1,050 ft (320 m)

Population (2020)
  - Total: 80
  - Density: 2.1/sq mi (0.8/km^{2})
- Time zone: UTC-6 (Central (CST))
  - Summer (DST): UTC-5 (CDT)
- FIPS code: 27-16012
- GNIS feature ID: 0663987

Dollymount Township is a township in Traverse County, Minnesota, United States. The population was 80 at the 2020 census.

Dollymount Township was organized in 1881, and named after Dollymount, Ireland, although the name also alludes to Anthony Doll, an early settler in the area.

== Geography ==
According to the United States Census Bureau, the township has a total area of 38.4 square miles (99 km^{2}), all land.

== Demographics ==
As of the census of 2000, there were 83 people, 27 households, and 25 families residing in the township. The population density was 2.2 inhabitants per square mile (0.85/km^{2}). There were 33 housing units at an average density of 0.9 units per square mile (0.35 units/km^{2}). The racial makeup of the township was 95.18% White, 1.20% Pacific Islander, and 3.61% from two or more races. Hispanic or Latino of any race were 9.64% of the population.

There were 27 households, out of which 44.4% had children under the age of 18 living with them, 88.9% were married couples living together, 3.7% had a female householder with no husband present, and 7.4% were non-families. 7.4% of all households were made up of individuals, and 3.7% had someone living alone who was 65 years of age or older. The average household size was 3.07 and the average family size was 3.24.

In the township the population was spread out, with 31.3% under the age of 18, 6.0% from 18 to 24, 24.1% from 25 to 44, 19.3% from 45 to 64, and 19.3% who were 65 years of age or older. The median age was 39 years. For every 100 females, there were 112.8 males. For every 100 females age 18 and over, there were 111.1 males.

The median income for a household in the township was $42,083, and the median income for a family was $47,813. Males had a median income of $23,750 versus $25,625 for females. The per capita income for the township was $14,587. There were no families and 3.8% of the population living below the poverty line, including no under eighteens and none of those over 64.
