= Croke Township, Traverse County, Minnesota =

Township in Minnesota, United States

Croke Township, Minnesota
- Township
- Location within the state of Minnesota Croke Township, Minnesota (the United States)
- Coordinates: 45°42′44″N 96°26′35″W
- Country: United States
- State: Minnesota
- County: Traverse

Area
  - Total: 35.9 sq mi (93.0 km^{2})
  - Land: 35.9 sq mi (93.0 km^{2})
  - Water: 0 sq mi (0.0 km^{2})
- Elevation: 1,040 ft (317 m)

Population (2000)
  - Total: 84
  - Density: 2.3/sq mi (0.9/km^{2})
- Time zone: UTC-6 (Central (CST))
  - Summer (DST): UTC-5 (CDT)
- FIPS code: 27-13762
- GNIS feature ID: 0663887

Croke Township is a township in Traverse County, Minnesota, United States. The population was 84 in the 2000 census.

== History ==
Croke Township was organized in 1881, and named after Thomas Croke (1824–1902), a Roman Catholic Archbishop of Cashel and Emly in Ireland.

== Geography ==
According to the United States Census Bureau, the township has a total area of 35.9 square miles (93 km^{2}), all land.

== Demographics ==
As of the census of 2000, there were 84 people, 35 households, and 24 families residing in the township. The population density was 2.3 inhabitants per square mile (0.89/km^{2}). There were 39 housing units at an average density of 1.1 per square mile (0.42/km^{2}). The racial makeup of the township was 100.00% White.

There were 35 households, out of which 20.0% had children under the age of 18 living with them, 68.6% were married couples living together, and 28.6% were non-families. 22.9% of all households were made up of individuals, and 5.7% had someone living alone who was 65 years of age or older. The average household size was 2.40 and the average family size was 2.88.

In the township the population was spread out, with 14.3% under the age of 18, 13.1% from 18 to 24, 26.2% from 25 to 44, 29.8% from 45 to 64, and 16.7% who were 65 years of age or older. The median age was 44 years. For every 100 females, there were 121.1 males. For every 100 females age 18 and over, there were 118.2 males.

The median income for a household in the township was $38,750, and the median income for a family was $43,750. Males had a median income of $28,750 versus $85,489 for females. The per capita income for the township was $28,122. There were no families and 2.3% of the population living below the poverty line, including no under eighteens and none of those over 64.
