= Mustinka River =

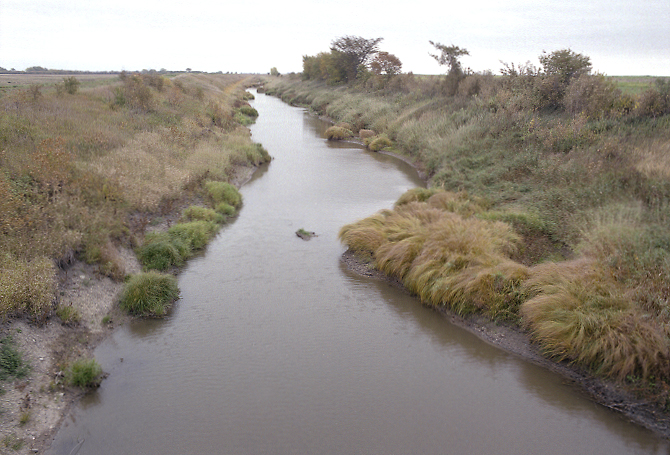
- A straightened and re-routed section of the Mustinka River in Redpath Township of Traverse County

- Mouth of the Mustinka River

Location
- Country: United States
- State: Minnesota
- Counties: Traverse, Grant, and Otter Tail

Physical characteristics
- Source
  - coordinates: 46.2124597°N 96.1045034°W
- Mouth
  - location: Lake Traverse
  - coordinates: 45.7650°N 96.6176°W
- Length: 68 mi (109 km)
- Basin size: 909 square miles (2,350 km^{2})

Basin features
- River system: Hudson Bay

The Mustinka River is a tributary of Lake Traverse, 68 mi (109 km) long, in western Minnesota in the United States. Via Lake Traverse, the Bois de Sioux River, the Red River of the North, Lake Winnipeg, and the Nelson River, it is part of the watershed of Hudson Bay. The river drains an area of 909 square miles (2,350 km^{2}).

Mustinka is a name derived from the Dakota language meaning "rabbit".

== Course ==
The Mustinka River rises about 5 miles (8 km) south-southwest of Fergus Falls in southwestern Otter Tail County and initially flows generally southward into Grant County, passing through Stony Brook Lake and Lightning Lake. The river turns westwardly in southern Grant County and flows past Norcross into Traverse County, where it turns southwestward past Wheaton. It flows into the northern end of Lake Traverse from the east, about 7 miles (11 km) southwest of Wheaton. Twelvemile Creek is a tributary of the Mustinka River.

Much of the river's lower course has been straightened and channelized.

== See also ==
- List of rivers of Minnesota
- List of longest streams of Minnesota
