= Tintah, Minnesota =

City in Minnesota, United States

- City
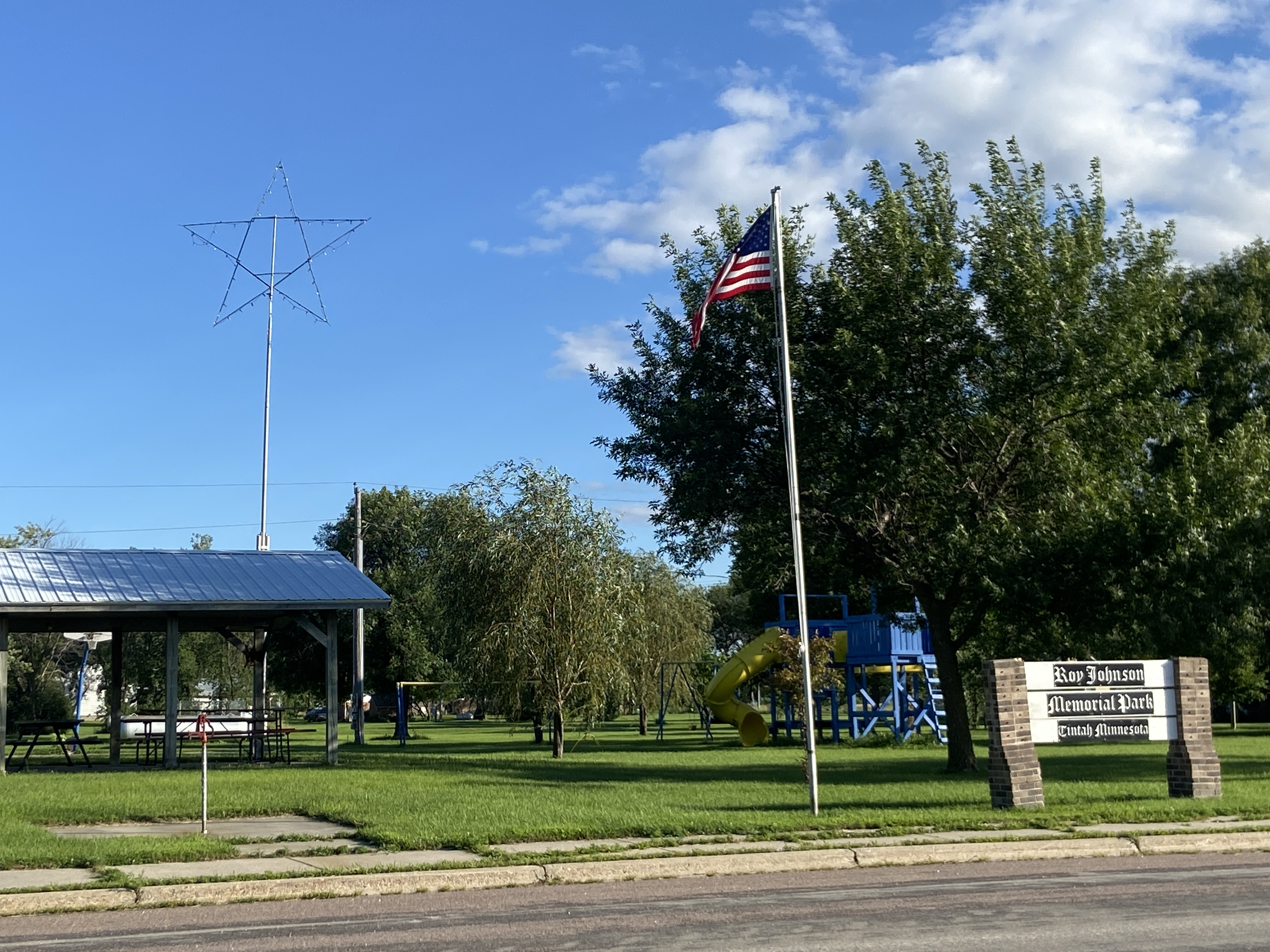

- Location of Tintah, Minnesota
- Coordinates: 46°0′37″N 96°19′18″W
- Country: United States
- State: Minnesota
- County: Traverse
- Platted: March 1, 1887
- Incorporated: May 2, 1889

Government
  - Mayor: Randall Don Bullis

Area
  - Total: 0.752 sq mi (1.947 km^{2})
  - Land: 0.752 sq mi (1.947 km^{2})
  - Water: 0 sq mi (0.000 km^{2})
- Elevation: 997 ft (304 m)

Population (2020)
  - Total: 67
  - Estimate (2022): 65
  - Density: 89.1/sq mi (34.41/km^{2})
- Time zone: UTC−6 (Central (CST))
  - Summer (DST): UTC−5 (CDT)
- ZIP Code: 56583
- Area code: 218
- FIPS code: 27-64948
- GNIS feature ID: 0653215
- Sales tax: 6.875%

Tintah is a city in Traverse County, Minnesota, United States. The population was 67 at the 2020 census. Tintah is a name derived from the Dakota word Ṭíƞta which means "prairie".

== Geography ==
According to the United States Census Bureau, the city has a total area of 0.752 square miles (1.95 km^{2}), all land.

Minnesota State Highway 9 serves as a main route in the community, and Minnesota State Highway 55 is nearby.

== Demographics ==
Historical population
Census	Pop.	Note	%±
1900	220		—
1910	217		−1.4%
1920	249		14.7%
1930	192		−22.9%
1940	200		4.2%
1950	235		17.5%
1960	228		−3.0%
1970	167		−26.8%
1980	119		−28.7%
1990	74		−37.8%
2000	79		6.8%
2010	63		−20.3%
2020	67		6.3%
2022 (est.)	65		−3.0%
U.S. Decennial Census; 2020 Census

=== 2010 census ===
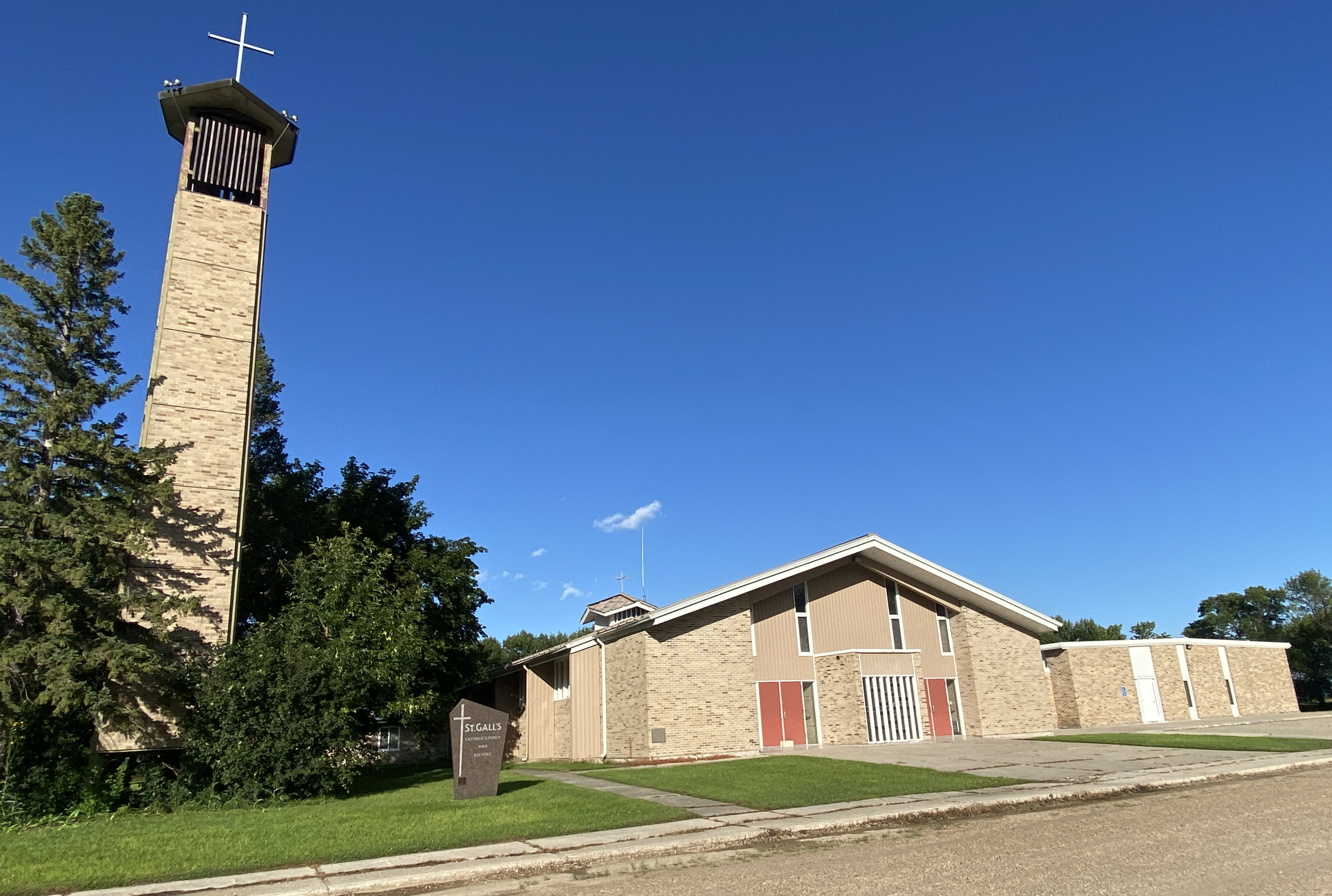
St. Gall's Catholic Church

As of the 2010 census, there were 63 people, 29 households, and 17 families residing in the city. The population density was 82.9 inhabitants per square mile (32.0/km^{2}). There were 34 housing units at an average density of 44.7 per square mile (17.3/km^{2}). The racial makeup of the city was 98.4% White and 1.6% from two or more races.

There were 29 households, of which 24.1% had children under the age of 18 living with them, 37.9% were married couples living together, 13.8% had a female householder with no husband present, 6.9% had a male householder with no wife present, and 41.4% were non-families. 41.4% of all households were made up of individuals, and 24.1% had someone living alone who was 65 years of age or older. The average household size was 2.17 and the average family size was 2.82.

The median age in the city was 44.3 years. 27% of residents were under the age of 18; 6.2% were between the ages of 18 and 24; 19.1% were from 25 to 44; 23.8% were from 45 to 64; and 23.8% were 65 years of age or older. The gender makeup of the city was 57.1% male and 42.9% female.

=== 2000 census ===
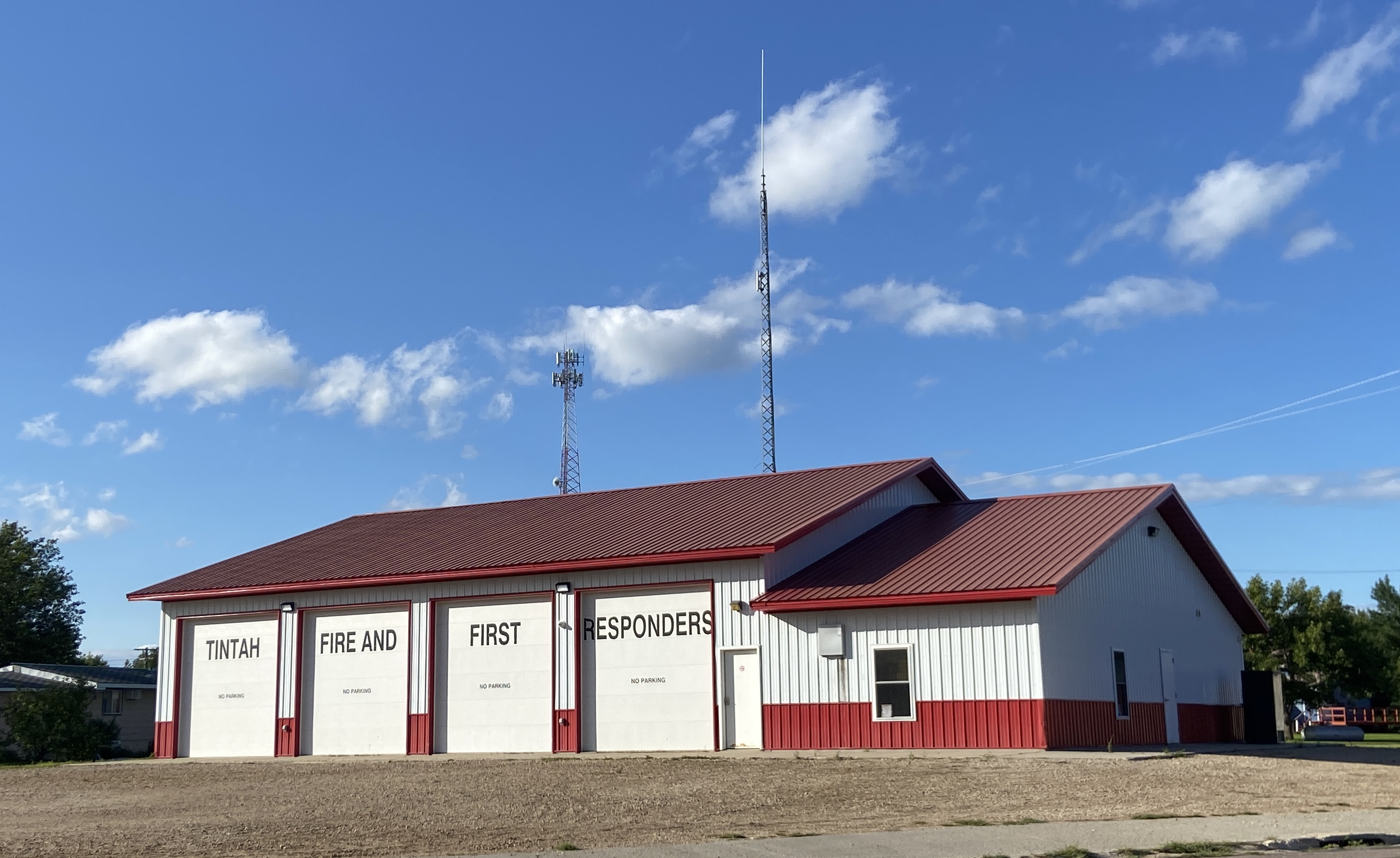
Fire Department

As of the 2000 census, there were 79 people, 37 households, and 21 families residing in the city. The population density was 104.7 inhabitants per square mile (40.4/km^{2}). There were 45 housing units at an average density of 59.6 per square mile (23.0/km^{2}). The racial makeup of the city was 100.00% White.

There were 37 households, out of which 24.3% had children under the age of 18 living with them, 43.2% were married couples living together, 10.8% had a female householder with no husband present, and 43.2% were non-families. 40.5% of all households were made up of individuals, and 27.0% had someone living alone who was 65 years of age or older. The average household size was 2.14 and the average family size was 2.86.

In the city, the population was spread out, with 26.6% under the age of 18, 5.1% from 18 to 24, 26.6% from 25 to 44, 12.7% from 45 to 64, and 29.1% who were 65 years of age or older. The median age was 40 years. For every 100 females, there were 92.7 males. For every 100 females age 18 and over, there were 87.1 males.

The median income for a household in the city was $15,500, and the median income for a family was $13,125. Males had a median income of $18,750 versus $0 for females. The per capita income for the city was $13,536. There were 36.8% of families and 23.4% of the population living below the poverty line, including no under eighteens and 26.1% of those over 64.
