= Windsor Township, Traverse County, Minnesota =

Township in Minnesota, United States

Windsor Township, Minnesota
- Township
- Location within the state of Minnesota Windsor Township, Minnesota (the United States)
- Coordinates: 45°41′46″N 96°40′18″W
- Country: United States
- State: Minnesota
- County: Traverse

Area
  - Total: 21.8 sq mi (56.4 km^{2})
  - Land: 15.7 sq mi (40.6 km^{2})
  - Water: 6.1 sq mi (15.8 km^{2})
- Elevation: 1,112 ft (339 m)

Population (2000)
  - Total: 54
  - Density: 3.4/sq mi (1.3/km^{2})
- Time zone: UTC-6 (Central (CST))
  - Summer (DST): UTC-5 (CDT)
- FIPS code: 27-70834
- GNIS feature ID: 0666016

Windsor Township is a township in Traverse County, Minnesota, United States. The population was 54 at the 2000 census.

== History ==
Windsor Township was organized in 1881.

== Geography ==
According to the United States Census Bureau, the township has a total area of 21.8 square miles (56.4 km^{2}), of which 15.7 square miles (40.6 km^{2}) is land and 6.1 square miles (15.8 km^{2}) (28.04%) is water.

== Demographics ==
As of the census of 2000, there were 54 people, 23 households, and 18 families residing in the township. The population density was 3.4 people per square mile (1.3/km^{2}). There were 147 housing units at an average density of 9.4/sq mi (3.6/km^{2}). The racial makeup of the township was 100.00% White.

There were 23 households, out of which 30.4% had children under the age of 18 living with them, 73.9% were married couples living together, and 21.7% were non-families. 21.7% of all households were made up of individuals, and none had someone living alone who was 65 years of age or older. The average household size was 2.35 and the average family size was 2.72.

In the township the population was spread out, with 24.1% under the age of 18, 1.9% from 18 to 24, 24.1% from 25 to 44, 29.6% from 45 to 64, and 20.4% who were 65 years of age or older. The median age was 45 years. For every 100 females, there were 125.0 males. For every 100 females age 18 and over, there were 127.8 males.

The median income for a household in the township was $26,250, and the median income for a family was $26,250. Males had a median income of $26,250 versus $6,250 for females. The per capita income for the township was $15,582. There were 9.1% of families and 6.8% of the population living below the poverty line, including 22.2% of under eighteens and none of those over 64.
