= Lake Valley Township, Traverse County, Minnesota =

Township in Minnesota, United States

Lake Valley Township, Minnesota
- Township
- Location within the state of Minnesota Lake Valley Township, Minnesota (the United States)
- Coordinates: 45°48′11″N 96°30′40″W
- Country: United States
- State: Minnesota
- County: Traverse

Area
  - Total: 61.9 sq mi (160.4 km^{2})
  - Land: 58.8 sq mi (152.4 km^{2})
  - Water: 3.1 sq mi (8.0 km^{2})
- Elevation: 1,014 ft (309 m)

Population (2000)
  - Total: 276
  - Density: 4.7/sq mi (1.8/km^{2})
- Time zone: UTC-6 (Central (CST))
  - Summer (DST): UTC-5 (CDT)
- FIPS code: 27-35126
- GNIS feature ID: 0664706

Lake Valley Township is a township in Traverse County, Minnesota, United States. The population was 276 at the 2000 census.

Lake Valley Township was organized in 1881. One property in the township, Larson's Hunters Resort, is listed on the National Register of Historic Places.

== Geography ==
According to the United States Census Bureau, the township has a total area of 61.9 square miles (160 km^{2}), of which 58.8 square miles (152 km^{2}) is land and 3.1 square miles (8.0 km^{2}) (5.00%) is water.

== Demographics ==
As of the census of 2000, there were 276 people, 104 households, and 76 families residing in the township. The population density was 4.7 inhabitants per square mile (1.8/km^{2}). There were 117 housing units at an average density of 2.0 per square mile (0.77/km^{2}). The racial makeup of the township was 97.83% White, 1.09% Asian, 0.36% from other races, and 0.72% from two or more races. Hispanic or Latino of any race were 1.09% of the population.

There were 104 households, out of which 36.5% had children under the age of 18 living with them, 69.2% were married couples living together, 3.8% had a female householder with no husband present, and 26.0% were non-families. 26.0% of all households were made up of individuals, and 15.4% had someone living alone who was 65 years of age or older. The average household size was 2.65 and the average family size was 3.22.

In the township the population was spread out, with 31.9% under the age of 18, 4.7% from 18 to 24, 24.6% from 25 to 44, 22.8% from 45 to 64, and 15.9% who were 65 years of age or older. The median age was 40 years. For every 100 females, there were 115.6 males. For every 100 females age 18 and over, there were 100.0 males.

The median income for a household in the township was $35,625, and the median income for a family was $41,667. Males had a median income of $31,875 versus $15,625 for females. The per capita income for the township was $16,176. About 3.0% of families and 6.3% of the population were below the poverty line, including 5.1% of those under the age of eighteen and 7.7% of those 65 or over.
