= Leonardsville Township, Traverse County, Minnesota =

Township in Minnesota, United States

Leonardsville Township, Minnesota
- Township
- Location within the state of Minnesota Leonardsville Township, Minnesota (the United States)
- Coordinates: 45°37′2″N 96°19′9″W
- Country: United States
- State: Minnesota
- County: Traverse

Area
  - Total: 38.5 sq mi (99.8 km^{2})
  - Land: 38.5 sq mi (99.8 km^{2})
  - Water: 0 sq mi (0.0 km^{2})
- Elevation: 1,070 ft (326 m)

Population (2000)
  - Total: 150
  - Density: 3.9/sq mi (1.5/km^{2})
- Time zone: UTC-6 (Central (CST))
  - Summer (DST): UTC-5 (CDT)
- FIPS code: 27-36512
- GNIS feature ID: 0664757

Leonardsville Township is a township in Traverse County, Minnesota, United States. The population was 150 at the 2000 census.

Leonardsville Township was organized in 1881, and named for Patrick Leonard, an early settler.

== Geography ==
According to the United States Census Bureau, the township has a total area of 38.5 square miles (100 km^{2}), all land.

== Demographics ==
As of the census of 2000, there were 150 people, 48 households, and 39 families residing in the township. The population density was 3.9 inhabitants per square mile (1.5/km^{2}). There were 54 housing units at an average density of 1.4 per square mile (0.54/km^{2}). The racial makeup of the township was 99.33% White, and 0.67% from two or more races. Hispanic or Latino of any race were 1.33% of the population.

There were 48 households, out of which 43.8% had children under the age of 18 living with them, 72.9% were married couples living together, and 18.8% were non-families. 16.7% of all households were made up of individuals, and 6.3% had someone living alone who was 65 years of age or older. The average household size was 3.13 and the average family size was 3.49.

In the township the population was spread out, with 34.7% under the age of 18, 9.3% from 18 to 24, 22.7% from 25 to 44, 19.3% from 45 to 64, and 14.0% who were 65 years of age or older. The median age was 34 years. For every 100 females, there were 108.3 males. For every 100 females age 18 and over, there were 108.5 males.

The median income for a household in the township was $26,875, and the median income for a family was $27,500. Males had a median income of $14,250 versus $21,250 for females. The per capita income for the township was $10,125. There were 19.4% of families and 17.2% of the population living below the poverty line, including 10.0% of under eighteens and 11.4% of those over 64.
