= Redpath Township, Traverse County, Minnesota =

Township in Minnesota, United States

Redpath Township, Minnesota
- Township
- Location within the state of Minnesota Redpath Township, Minnesota (the United States)
- Coordinates: 45°53′51″N 96°19′21″W
- Country: United States
- State: Minnesota
- County: Traverse

Area
  - Total: 39.0 sq mi (100.9 km^{2})
  - Land: 39.0 sq mi (100.9 km^{2})
  - Water: 0 sq mi (0.0 km^{2})
- Elevation: 1,004 ft (306 m)

Population (2000)
  - Total: 35
  - Density: 0.78/sq mi (0.3/km^{2})
- Time zone: UTC-6 (Central (CST))
  - Summer (DST): UTC-5 (CDT)
- FIPS code: 27-53548
- GNIS feature ID: 0665387

Redpath Township is a township in Traverse County, Minnesota, United States. The population was 35 at the 2000 census.

Redpath Township was organized in 1881, and named for an old Indian trail within its borders.

== Geography ==
According to the United States Census Bureau, the township has a total area of 39.0 square miles (100.9 km^{2}), all land.

== Demographics ==
As of the census of 2000, there were 35 people, 14 households, and 11 families residing in the township. The population density was 0.9 people per square mile (0.3/km^{2}). There were 21 housing units at an average density of 0.5/sq mi (0.2/km^{2}). The racial makeup of the township was 94.29% White. Hispanic or Latino of any race were 5.71% of the population.

There were 14 households, out of which 28.6% had children under the age of 18 living with them, 85.7% were married couples living together, and 14.3% were non-families. 7.1% of all households were made up of individuals, and none had someone living alone who was 65 years of age or older. The average household size was 2.50 and the average family size was 2.67.

In the township the population was spread out, with 20.0% under the age of 18, 8.6% from 18 to 24, 14.3% from 25 to 44, 31.4% from 45 to 64, and 25.7% who were 65 years of age or older. The median age was 47 years. For every 100 females, there were 105.9 males. For every 100 females age 18 and over, there were 100.0 males.

The median income for a household in the township was $29,375, and the median income for a family was $46,250. Males had a median income of $22,917 versus $23,750 for females. The per capita income for the township was $16,190. None of the population and none of the families were below the poverty line.
