= Tara Township, Traverse County, Minnesota =

Township in Minnesota, United States

Tara Township, Minnesota
- Township
- Location within the state of Minnesota Tara Township, Minnesota (the United States)
- Coordinates: 45°38′19″N 96°26′13″W
- Country: United States
- State: Minnesota
- County: Traverse

Area
  - Total: 36.4 sq mi (94.3 km^{2})
  - Land: 36.2 sq mi (93.7 km^{2})
  - Water: 0.23 sq mi (0.6 km^{2})
- Elevation: 1,070 ft (326 m)

Population (2000)
  - Total: 126
  - Density: 3.4/sq mi (1.3/km^{2})
- Time zone: UTC-6 (Central (CST))
  - Summer (DST): UTC-5 (CDT)
- FIPS code: 27-64246
- GNIS feature ID: 0665765

Tara Township is a township in Traverse County, Minnesota, United States. The population was 126 at the 2000 census.

== History ==
Tara Township was organized in 1881, and named after the Hill of Tara, in Ireland.

== Geography ==
According to the United States Census Bureau, the township has a total area of 36.4 square miles (94.3 km^{2}); 36.2 square miles (93.7 km^{2}) is land and 0.2 square mile (0.6 km^{2}) (0.63%) is water.

== Demographics ==
As of the census of 2000, there were 126 people, 46 households, and 35 families residing in the township. The population density was 3.5 people per square mile (1.3/km^{2}). There were 49 housing units at an average density of 1.4/sq mi (0.5/km^{2}). The racial makeup of the township was 100.00% White.

There were 46 households, out of which 34.8% had children under the age of 18 living with them, 76.1% were married couples living together, and 23.9% were non-families. 23.9% of all households were made up of individuals, and 10.9% had someone living alone who was 65 years of age or older. The average household size was 2.74 and the average family size was 3.29.

In the township the population was spread out, with 31.0% under the age of 18, 4.0% from 18 to 24, 23.8% from 25 to 44, 21.4% from 45 to 64, and 19.8% who were 65 years of age or older. The median age was 39 years. For every 100 females, there were 96.9 males. For every 100 females age 18 and over, there were 117.5 males.

The median income for a household in the township was $42,813, and the median income for a family was $43,438. Males had a median income of $33,438 versus $16,250 for females. The per capita income for the township was $18,640. There were no families and 3.2% of the population living below the poverty line, including no under eighteens and 6.9% of those over 64.
