= Lake Traverse =

Lake in the state of Minnesota, United States

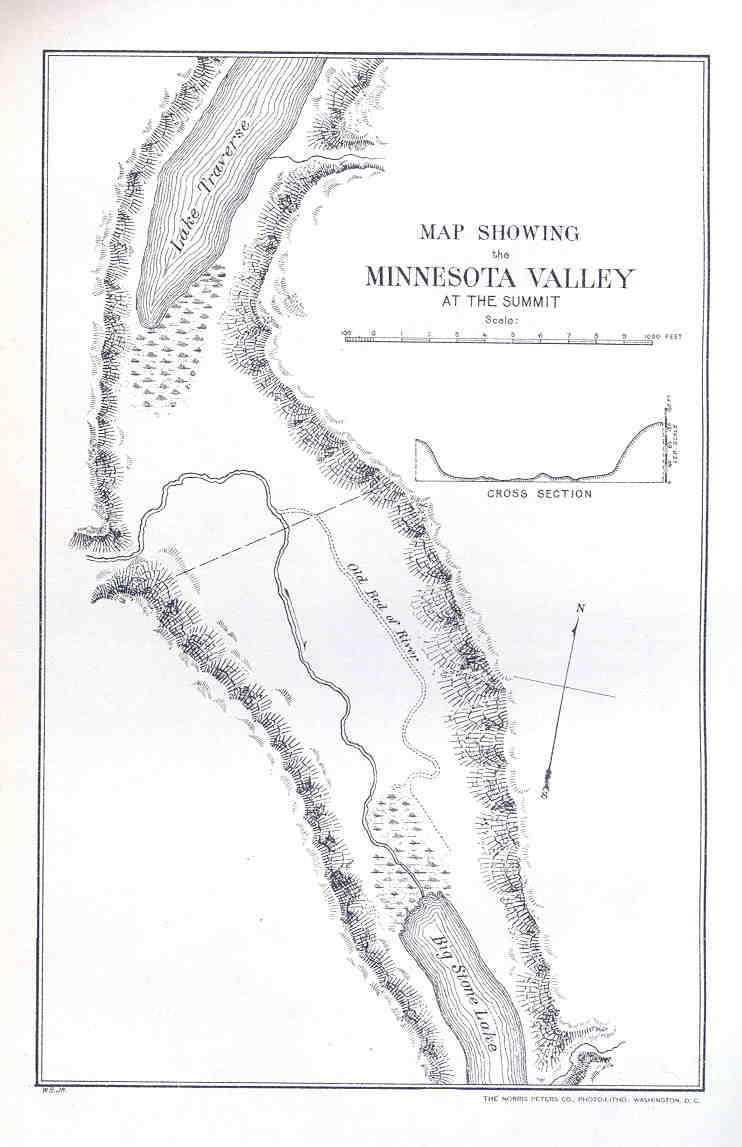
- The continental divide of Lake Traverse

- Location within Minnesota Location within South Dakota Location within the United States
- Location: Traverse County, Minnesota / Roberts County, South Dakota, United States
- Coordinates: 45°46′09″N 96°38′20″W
- Primary inflows: Mustinka River
- Primary outflows: Bois de Sioux River
- Basin countries: United States
- Surface elevation: 976 ft (297 m)

Lake Traverse is an 11,200-acre (4,500 ha) lake along the border between the U.S. states of Minnesota and South Dakota, and is the southernmost body of water in the Hudson Bay watershed of North America. Lake Traverse is drained at its north end by the northward-flowing Bois de Sioux River, a tributary of the Red River of the North. A U.S. Army Corps of Engineers dam at the outflow regulates the lake's level. The Mustinka River flows into the lake just above the dam.

Lake Traverse Indian Reservation of the Dakota Sioux lies on the west shore of the lake.

== Geography ==
The Traverse Gap, a low continental divide and part of the Laurentian Divide, separates the south end of Lake Traverse from Big Stone Lake. Big Stone Lake is the headwaters of the south-flowing Minnesota River, part of the Mississippi River System. Prehistorically, the south end of Lake Traverse was the southern outlet of glacial Lake Agassiz across the Traverse Gap into Glacial River Warren; that river carved the valley now occupied by the present-day Minnesota River. The town of Browns Valley, Minnesota lies within the gap between the two lakes.

== History ==
Lake Traverse is an Anglicization of Lac Traverse, a French name meaning "across the lake".

The Browns Valley Dike was constructed in 1941 at the south end of Lake Traverse to prevent flooding south into Big Stone Lake and the Mississippi watershed. However, the Little Minnesota River, which flows into Big Stone Lake, passes within 2,000 feet (610 m) of Lake Traverse. In case of flooding of the Little Minnesota River, its waters can pass through culverts within the dike, and across the divide into Lake Traverse. This prevents flooding of homes in the Browns Valley area.

== Fauna ==
Recreational fishing occurs in the lake. Fish species in the lake include bullheads, buffalo-fish, carp, crappie, northern pike, sheepshead, walleye and white bass. Fishing declines in the summer months, when algal blooms occur due to advanced eutrophication.

The lake serves as a resting area for migratory waterfowl.

== See also ==
- List of Minnesota lakes
- List of South Dakota lakes
- List of lakes
