= Monson Township, Traverse County, Minnesota =

Township in Minnesota, United States

Monson Township, Minnesota
- Township
- Location within the state of Minnesota Monson Township, Minnesota (the United States)
- Coordinates: 45°53′52″N 96°28′41″W
- Country: United States
- State: Minnesota
- County: Traverse

Area
  - Total: 54.2 sq mi (140.5 km^{2})
  - Land: 54.2 sq mi (140.4 km^{2})
  - Water: 0.039 sq mi (0.1 km^{2})
- Elevation: 1,001 ft (305 m)

Population (2000)
  - Total: 162
  - Density: 3.1/sq mi (1.2/km^{2})
- Time zone: UTC-6 (Central (CST))
  - Summer (DST): UTC-5 (CDT)
- FIPS code: 27-43684
- GNIS feature ID: 0665010

Monson Township is a township in Traverse County, Minnesota, United States. The population was 162 at the 2000 census.

== History ==
Monson Township was organized in 1881, and named for Peter Monson, a Swedish settler.

== Geography ==
According to the United States Census Bureau, the township has a total area of 54.2 square miles (140.5 km^{2}), of which 54.2 square miles (140.4 km^{2}) is land and 0.04 square mile (0.1 km^{2}) (0.07%) is water.

== Demographics ==
As of the census of 2000, there were 162 people, 57 households, and 44 families residing in the township. The population density was 3.0 people per square mile (1.2/km^{2}). There were 69 housing units at an average density of 1.3/sq mi (0.5/km^{2}). The racial makeup of the township was 100.00% White.

There were 57 households, out of which 42.1% had children under the age of 18 living with them, 75.4% were married couples living together, and 22.8% were non-families. 22.8% of all households were made up of individuals, and 15.8% had someone living alone who was 65 years of age or older. The average household size was 2.84 and the average family size was 3.34.

In the township the population was spread out, with 33.3% under the age of 18, 3.7% from 18 to 24, 21.6% from 25 to 44, 24.7% from 45 to 64, and 16.7% who were 65 years of age or older. The median age was 41 years. For every 100 females, there were 105.1 males. For every 100 females age 18 and over, there were 116.0 males.

The median income for a household in the township was $42,500, and the median income for a family was $46,250. Males had a median income of $31,667 versus $28,125 for females. The per capita income for the township was $13,454. About 11.4% of families and 7.0% of the population were below the poverty line, including 2.7% of those under the age of eighteen and 11.1% of those 65 or over.
