= Bois de Sioux River =

River in the United States

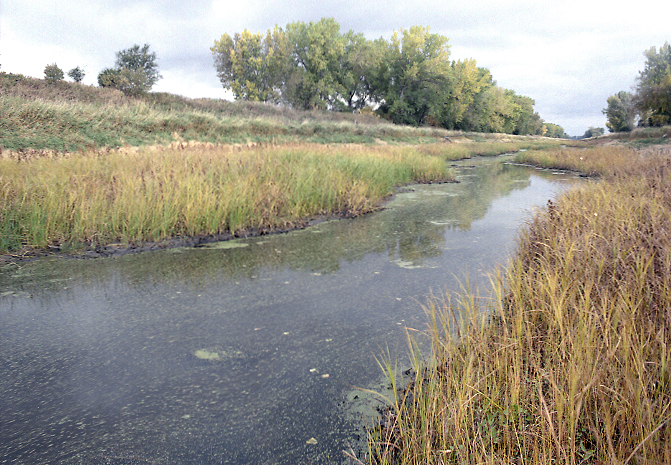
- The Bois de Sioux River below the dam of Lake Traverse. Roberts County, South Dakota is at left, and Traverse County, Minnesota is at right.

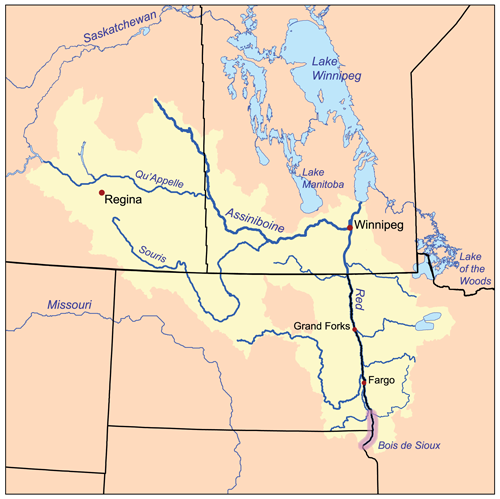
- Red River drainage basin, with Bois de Sioux River highlighted

Physical characteristics
- Source
  - location: Dam at the foot of Lake Traverse, South Dakota
  - coordinates: 45°51′42″N 96°34′23″W
- Mouth
  - location: Confluence with the Otter Tail River to form the Red River
  - coordinates: 46°15′52″N 96°35′55″W
  - elevation: 951 ft (290 m)
- Length: 41 mi (66 km)

Basin features
- Progression: Bois de Sioux River → Red River → Lake Winnipeg → Nelson River → Hudson Bay → Atlantic Ocean
- GNIS ID: 640348

The Bois de Sioux River (/ˌbɔɪz də ˈsuː/ BOYZ də SOO) drains Lake Traverse, the southernmost body of water in the Hudson Bay watershed of North America. It is a tributary of the Red River of the North and defines part of the western border of the U.S. state of Minnesota, and the eastern borders of North Dakota and South Dakota. It is about 41 miles (66 km) in length.

Bois de Sioux is a name derived from French meaning "Woods of the Sioux".

== Course ==
The river flows northward from a Corps of Engineers dam at the north end of Lake Traverse and shortly enters Mud Lake. Downstream of Mud Lake it is a small stream, and its flow has been channelized and straightened in some places so that the watercourse diverges slightly from the historical state boundary. It passes the town of White Rock, South Dakota, before joining the Otter Tail River to form the Red River of the North at Wahpeton, North Dakota, and Breckenridge, Minnesota.

== Tributaries ==
The two largest tributaries of the Bois de Sioux are the Mustinka River, which flows into Lake Traverse, and the Rabbit River south of Breckenridge; both of these enter from Minnesota.

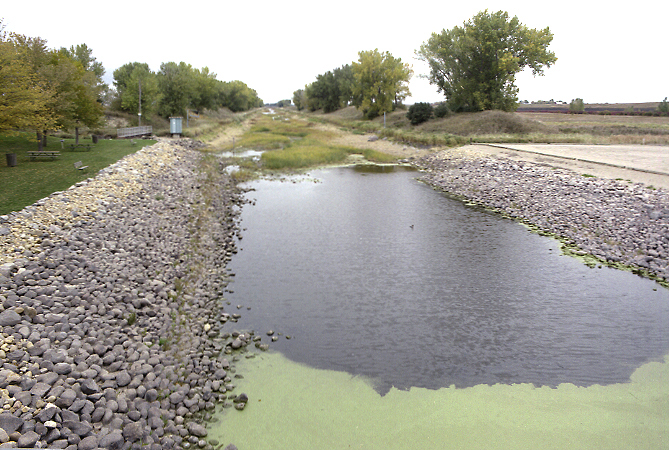
The Bois de Sioux River below the dam of Mud Lake, in Traverse County, Minnesota. This section of the river has been channelized in a straight line slightly east of the Minnesota–South Dakota border.

== See also ==
- List of rivers of Minnesota
- List of rivers of North Dakota
- List of rivers of South Dakota
- List of river borders of U.S. states
