= Tintah Township, Traverse County, Minnesota =

Township in Minnesota, United States

Tintah Township, Minnesota
- Township
- Location within the state of Minnesota Tintah Township, Minnesota (the United States)
- Coordinates: 45°58′59″N 96°18′51″W
- Country: United States
- State: Minnesota
- County: Traverse

Area
  - Total: 34.9 sq mi (90.5 km^{2})
  - Land: 34.9 sq mi (90.5 km^{2})
  - Water: 0 sq mi (0.0 km^{2})
- Elevation: 994 ft (303 m)

Population (2000)
  - Total: 53
  - Density: 1.6/sq mi (0.6/km^{2})
- Time zone: UTC-6 (Central (CST))
  - Summer (DST): UTC-5 (CDT)
- ZIP code: 56583
- Area code: 218
- FIPS code: 27-64966
- GNIS feature ID: 0665791

Tintah Township is a township in Traverse County, Minnesota, United States. The population was 53 at the 2000 census.

== History ==
Tintah Township was organized in 1881. Tintah is a name derived from the Dakota language meaning "prairie".

== Geography ==
According to the United States Census Bureau, the township has a total area of 34.9 square miles (90.5 km^{2}), all land.

== Demographics ==
As of the census of 2000, there were 53 people, 18 households, and 14 families residing in the township. The population density was 1.5 people per square mile (0.6/km^{2}). There were 20 housing units at an average density of 0.6/sq mi (0.2/km^{2}). The racial makeup of the township was 100.00% White.

There were 18 households, out of which 44.4% had children under the age of 18 living with them, 77.8% were married couples living together, 5.6% had a female householder with no husband present, and 16.7% were non-families. 16.7% of all households were made up of individuals, and 5.6% had someone living alone who was 65 years of age or older. The average household size was 2.94 and the average family size was 3.33.

In the township the population was spread out, with 24.5% under the age of 18, 13.2% from 18 to 24, 20.8% from 25 to 44, 28.3% from 45 to 64, and 13.2% who were 65 years of age or older. The median age was 40 years. For every 100 females, there were 120.8 males. For every 100 females age 18 and over, there were 100.0 males.

The median income for a household in the township was $38,125, and the median income for a family was $39,375. Males had a median income of $39,583 versus $5,833 for females. The per capita income for the township was $14,443. There were 18.2% of families and 22.5% of the population living below the poverty line, including 22.2% of under eighteens and 33.3% of those over 64.
