= Wheaton, Minnesota =

City in Minnesota, United States

Wheaton
- City
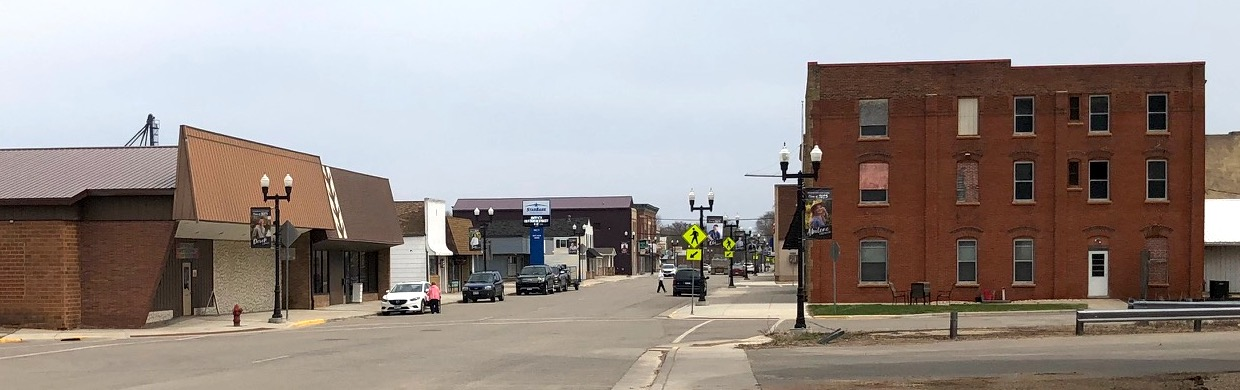
- Commercial businesses on Broadway

- Location of Wheaton within Traverse County, Minnesota
- Coordinates: 45°48′17″N 96°29′46″W
- Country: United States
- State: Minnesota
- County: Traverse

Area
  - Total: 1.74 sq mi (4.50 km^{2})
  - Land: 1.74 sq mi (4.50 km^{2})
  - Water: 0 sq mi (0.00 km^{2})
- Elevation: 1,020 ft (311 m)

Population (2020)
  - Total: 1,460
  - Estimate (2021): 1,426
  - Density: 840.6/sq mi (324.54/km^{2})
- Time zone: UTC-6 (CST)
  - Summer (DST): UTC-5 (CDT)
- ZIP code: 56296
- Area code: 320
- FIPS code: 27-69844
- GNIS feature ID: 0654055
- Website: cityofwheaton.com

Wheaton is a city and the county seat of Traverse County, Minnesota, United States. The population was 1,460 at the 2020 census.

== History ==
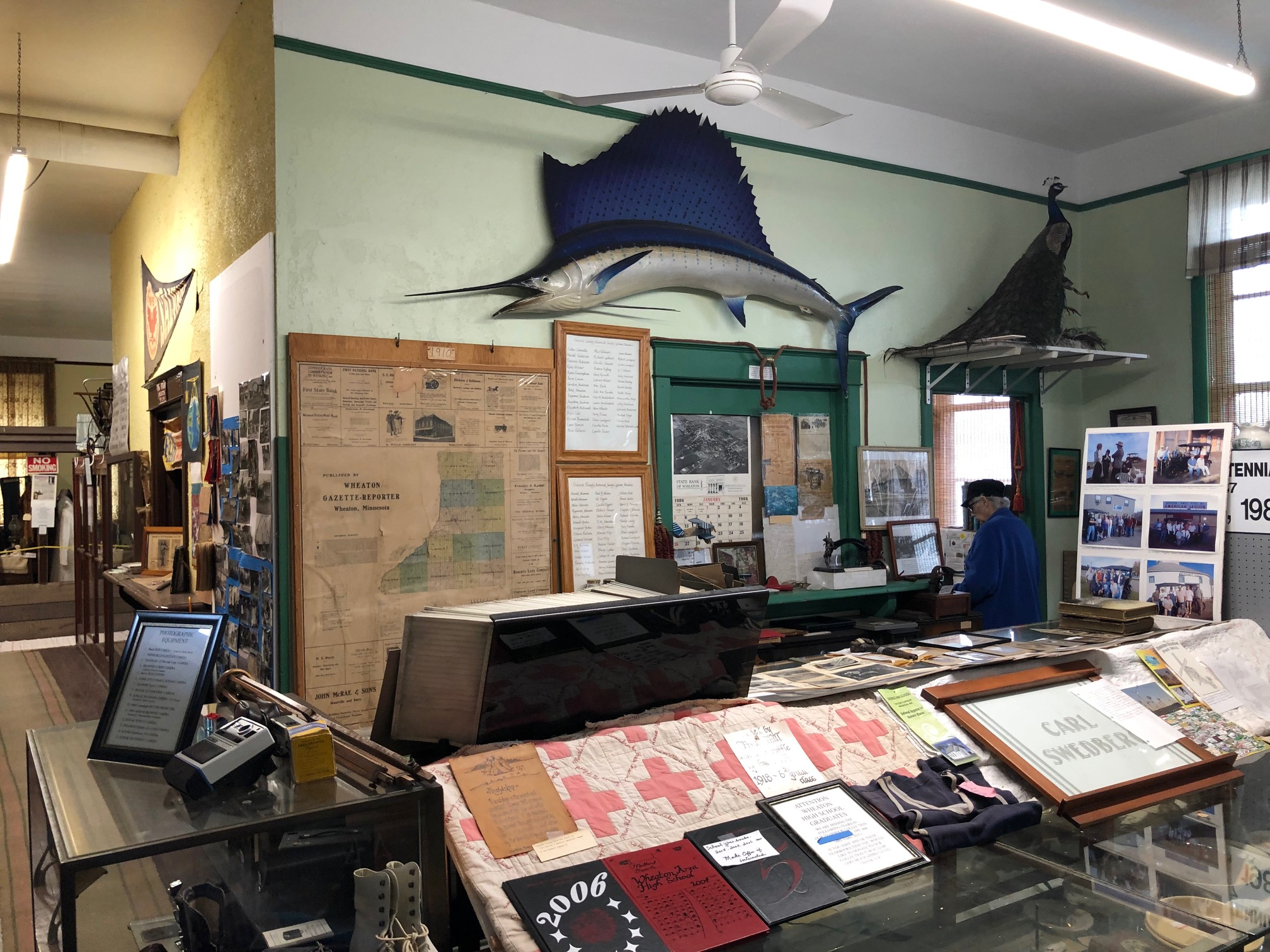
Exhibit display at the Traverse County Historical Society Museum

A post office called Wheaton has been in operation since 1884. Wheaton was designated county seat in 1886. The city was named for Daniel Thompson Wheaton, a railroad surveyor. One property in the city is listed on the National Register of Historic Places: the Wheaton Depot, built circa 1906.

== Geography ==
Wheaton lies along the Mustinka River. According to the United States Census Bureau, the city has an area of 1.80 square miles (4.66 km^{2}), all land.

U.S. Highway 75 and Minnesota State Highway 27 are two of the city's main routes.

=== Climate ===
Climate data for Wheaton, Minnesota (1991–2020 normals, extremes 1914–present)
Month	Jan	Feb	Mar	Apr	May	Jun	Jul	Aug	Sep	Oct	Nov	Dec	Year
Record high °F (°C)	61 (16)	66 (19)	84 (29)	98 (37)	106 (41)	106 (41)	113 (45)	109 (43)	108 (42)	96 (36)	81 (27)	74 (23)	113 (45)
Mean daily maximum °F (°C)	20.1 (−6.6)	24.9 (−3.9)	38.2 (3.4)	54.5 (12.5)	68.5 (20.3)	78.2 (25.7)	82.4 (28.0)	80.6 (27.0)	72.9 (22.7)	57.7 (14.3)	40.5 (4.7)	25.6 (−3.6)	53.7 (12.1)
Daily mean °F (°C)	11.4 (−11.4)	15.5 (−9.2)	28.9 (−1.7)	43.9 (6.6)	57.7 (14.3)	68.4 (20.2)	72.4 (22.4)	70.1 (21.2)	61.5 (16.4)	47.2 (8.4)	31.6 (−0.2)	17.7 (−7.9)	43.9 (6.6)
Mean daily minimum °F (°C)	2.7 (−16.3)	6.0 (−14.4)	19.7 (−6.8)	33.2 (0.7)	46.9 (8.3)	58.6 (14.8)	62.4 (16.9)	59.7 (15.4)	50.2 (10.1)	36.7 (2.6)	22.8 (−5.1)	9.9 (−12.3)	34.1 (1.2)
Record low °F (°C)	−38 (−39)	−35 (−37)	−30 (−34)	−7 (−22)	14 (−10)	31 (−1)	39 (4)	31 (−1)	18 (−8)	−4 (−20)	−17 (−27)	−34 (−37)	−38 (−39)
Average precipitation inches (mm)	0.78 (20)	0.71 (18)	1.18 (30)	2.30 (58)	2.80 (71)	4.22 (107)	3.52 (89)	2.72 (69)	2.90 (74)	2.27 (58)	1.08 (27)	0.82 (21)	25.30 (643)
Average snowfall inches (cm)	8.0 (20)	9.0 (23)	7.1 (18)	5.3 (13)	0.0 (0.0)	0.0 (0.0)	0.0 (0.0)	0.0 (0.0)	0.0 (0.0)	1.0 (2.5)	3.9 (9.9)	8.6 (22)	42.9 (109)
Average precipitation days (≥ 0.01 in)	5.5	4.7	5.6	6.9	9.3	10.3	9.6	7.9	7.4	7.9	4.6	5.6	85.3
Average snowy days (≥ 0.1 in)	5.3	4.3	3.1	1.7	0.0	0.0	0.0	0.0	0.0	0.8	2.2	5.2	22.6
Source: NOAA

== Demographics ==
Historical population
Census	Pop.	Note	%±
1890	883		—
1900	1,132		28.2%
1910	1,300		14.8%
1920	1,337		2.8%
1930	1,279		−4.3%
1940	1,700		32.9%
1950	1,948		14.6%
1960	2,102		7.9%
1970	2,029		−3.5%
1980	1,969		−3.0%
1990	1,615		−18.0%
2000	1,619		0.2%
2010	1,424		−12.0%
2020	1,460		2.5%
2021 (est.)	1,426		−2.3%
U.S. Decennial Census; 2020 Census

=== 2010 census ===
As of the census of 2010, there were 1,424 people, 655 households, and 370 families living in the city. The population density was 791.1 inhabitants per square mile (305.4/km^{2}). There were 834 housing units at an average density of 463.3 per square mile (178.9/km^{2}). The racial makeup of the city was 97.4% White, 0.6% African American, 0.7% Native American, 0.1% Asian, 0.1% Pacific Islander, 0.2% from other races, and 1.0% from two or more races. Hispanic or Latino of any race were 1.5% of the population.

There were 655 households, of which 21.8% had children under the age of 18 living with them, 48.4% were married couples living together, 6.1% had a female householder with no husband present, 2.0% had a male householder with no wife present, and 43.5% were non-families. 39.8% of all households were made up of individuals, and 24% had someone living alone who was 65 years of age or older. The average household size was 2.08 and the average family size was 2.79.

The median age in the city was 49.5 years. 20.4% of residents were under the age of 18; 5.3% were between the ages of 18 and 24; 18.5% were from 25 to 44; 24.3% were from 45 to 64; and 31.5% were 65 years of age or older. The gender makeup of the city was 47.2% male and 52.8% female.

=== 2000 census ===
As of the census of 2000, there were 1,619 people, 747 households, and 434 families living in the city. The population density was 909.2 inhabitants per square mile (351.0/km^{2}). There were 907 housing units at an average density of 509.4 per square mile (196.7/km^{2}). The racial makeup of the city was 99.20% White, 0.37% Native American, 0.31% Asian, 0.06% Pacific Islander, and 0.06% from two or more races. Hispanic or Latino of any race were 1.42% of the population.

There were 747 households, out of which 23.3% had children under the age of 18 living with them, 48.1% were married couples living together, 7.9% had a female householder with no husband present, and 41.8% were non-families. 39.1% of all households were made up of individuals, and 25.8% had someone living alone who was 65 years of age or older. The average household size was 2.07 and the average family size was 2.76.

In the city, the population was spread out, with 21.4% under the age of 18, 5.0% from 18 to 24, 20.7% from 25 to 44, 20.3% from 45 to 64, and 32.7% who were 65 years of age or older. The median age was 48 years. For every 100 females, there were 86.1 males. For every 100 females age 18 and over, there were 83.4 males.

The median income for a household in the city was $29,219, and the median income for a family was $41,827. Males had a median income of $30,313 versus $19,750 for females. The per capita income for the city was $18,181. About 7.2% of families and 10.9% of the population were below the poverty line, including 11.7% of those under age 18 and 12.6% of those age 65 or over.

== Politics ==
Presidential election results

2020 Precinct Results Spreadsheet2016 Precinct Results Spreadsheet2012 Precinct Results Spreadsheet2008 Precinct Results Spreadsheet2004 Precinct Results Spreadsheet2000 Precinct Results Spreadsheet
Year	Republican	Democratic	Third parties
2020	53.8% 403	44.9% 336	1.3% 10
2016	49.3% 367	42.8% 319	7.9% 59
2012	39.9% 303	58.3% 443	1.8% 14
2008	43.9% 351	53.4% 427	2.7% 21
2004	43.5% 381	54.5% 477	1.0% 18
2000	43.6% 376	48.9% 422	7.5% 65
