= Traverse County, Minnesota =

County in Minnesota, United States

- County
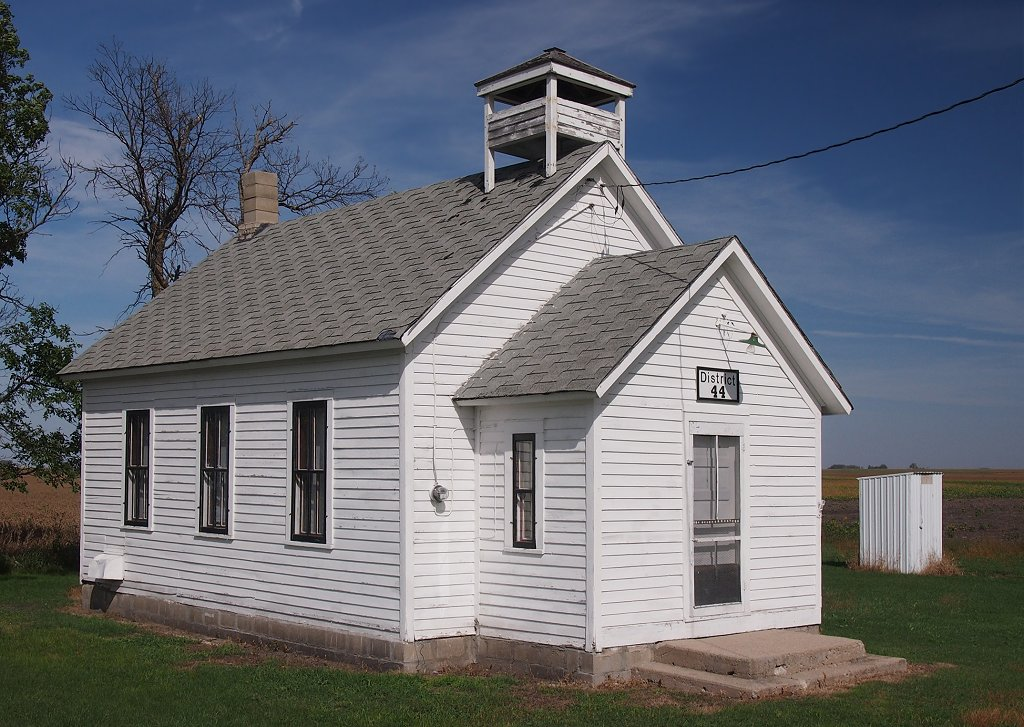
- Old District No. 44 School

- Location within the U.S. state of Minnesota
- Coordinates: 45°46′N 96°28′W
- Country: United States
- State: Minnesota
- Created: 1862
- Organized: 1881
- Named for: Lake Traverse
- Seat: Wheaton
- Largest city: Wheaton

Area
  - Total: 586 sq mi (1,520 km^{2})
  - Land: 574 sq mi (1,490 km^{2})
  - Water: 12 sq mi (31 km^{2}) 2.0%

Population (2020)
  - Total: 3,360
  - Estimate (2025): 3,130 ▼
  - Density: 5.9/sq mi (2.3/km^{2})
- Time zone: UTC−6 (Central)
  - Summer (DST): UTC−5 (CDT)
- Congressional district: 7th
- Website: traversecountymn.gov

Traverse County (locally /ˈtrævərs/ TRAV-ərss) is a county in the U.S. state of Minnesota. As of the 2020 census, the population was 3,360, making it the least-populous county in Minnesota. Its county seat is Wheaton. The county was founded in 1862 and organized in 1881.

== Geography ==
Traverse County lies on the western edge of Minnesota. Its western border abuts the eastern borders of the states of North and South Dakota. The Red River flows northward along the county's western line. The Mustinka River flows southwestward through the county's upper portion, discharging into Lake Traverse. The county terrain consists of low rolling hills, fully devoted to agriculture except in developed areas. The terrain slopes to the west and north, with its highest point at the southeastern corner, at 1,119 ft (341 m) ASL. The county has a total area of 586 square miles (1,520 km^{2}), of which 574 square miles (1,490 km^{2}) is land and 12 square miles (31 km^{2}) (2.0%) is water.

Soils of Traverse County

=== Major highways ===
- U.S. Route 75
- Minnesota State Highway 9
- Minnesota State Highway 27
- Minnesota State Highway 28
- Minnesota State Highway 117

=== Adjacent counties ===
- Wilkin County - north
- Grant County - northeast
- Stevens County - southeast
- Big Stone County - south
- Roberts County, South Dakota - southwest
- Richland County, North Dakota - northwest

=== Protected areas ===
- Reservation Dam State Wildlife Management Area
- White Rock Dam State Wildlife Management Area

=== Lakes ===
- Lake Traverse (part)
- Mud Lake - (part)
- Saint Marys Lake
- Wet Lake

== Demographics ==
Historical population
Census	Pop.	Note	%±
1870	13		—
1880	1,507		11,492.3%
1890	4,516		199.7%
1900	7,573		67.7%
1910	8,049		6.3%
1920	7,943		−1.3%
1930	7,938		−0.1%
1940	8,283		4.3%
1950	8,053		−2.8%
1960	7,503		−6.8%
1970	6,254		−16.6%
1980	5,542		−11.4%
1990	4,463		−19.5%
2000	4,134		−7.4%
2010	3,558		−13.9%
2020	3,360		−5.6%
2025 (est.)	3,130	▼	−6.8%
U.S. Decennial Census; 1790-1960 1900-1990; 1990-2000 2010-2020

=== Racial and ethnic composition ===
Traverse County, Minnesota – Racial and ethnic composition Note: the US Census treats Hispanic/Latino as an ethnic category. This table excludes Latinos from the racial categories and assigns them to a separate category. Hispanics/Latinos may be of any race.
Race / Ethnicity (NH = Non-Hispanic)	Pop 1980	Pop 1990	Pop 2000	Pop 2010	Pop 2020	% 1980	% 1990	% 2000	% 2010	% 2020
White alone (NH)	5,427	4,314	3,946	3,324	2,851	97.92%	96.66%	95.45%	93.42%	84.85%
Black or African American alone (NH)	4	0	1	12	21	0.07%	0.00%	0.02%	0.34%	0.63%
Native American or Alaska Native alone (NH)	78	125	110	129	183	1.41%	2.80%	2.66%	3.63%	5.45%
Asian alone (NH)	16	16	11	4	0	0.29%	0.36%	0.27%	0.11%	0.00%
Native Hawaiian or Pacific Islander alone (NH)	x	x	2	1	0	x	x	0.05%	0.03%	0.00%
Other race alone (NH)	8	0	0	1	5	0.14%	0.00%	0.00%	0.03%	0.15%
Mixed race or Multiracial (NH)	x	x	14	37	103	x	x	0.34%	1.04%	3.07%
Hispanic or Latino (any race)	9	8	50	50	197	0.16%	0.18%	1.21%	1.41%	5.86%
Total	5,542	4,463	4,134	3,558	3,360	100.00%	100.00%	100.00%	100.00%	100.00%

=== 2020 census ===
As of the 2020 census, the county had a population of 3,360. The median age was 46.8 years. 21.8% of residents were under the age of 18 and 26.3% of residents were 65 years of age or older. For every 100 females there were 99.6 males, and for every 100 females age 18 and over there were 101.6 males age 18 and over.

The racial makeup of the county was 85.4% White, 0.8% Black or African American, 6.5% American Indian and Alaska Native, <0.1% Asian, <0.1% Native Hawaiian and Pacific Islander, 2.4% from some other race, and 4.9% from two or more races. Hispanic or Latino residents of any race comprised 5.9% of the population.

<0.1% of residents lived in urban areas, while 100.0% lived in rural areas.

There were 1,439 households in the county, of which 24.9% had children under the age of 18 living in them. Of all households, 50.2% were married-couple households, 20.8% were households with a male householder and no spouse or partner present, and 23.3% were households with a female householder and no spouse or partner present. About 33.2% of all households were made up of individuals and 17.1% had someone living alone who was 65 years of age or older.

There were 1,877 housing units, of which 23.3% were vacant. Among occupied housing units, 78.5% were owner-occupied and 21.5% were renter-occupied. The homeowner vacancy rate was 2.9% and the rental vacancy rate was 12.5%.

=== 2000 census ===
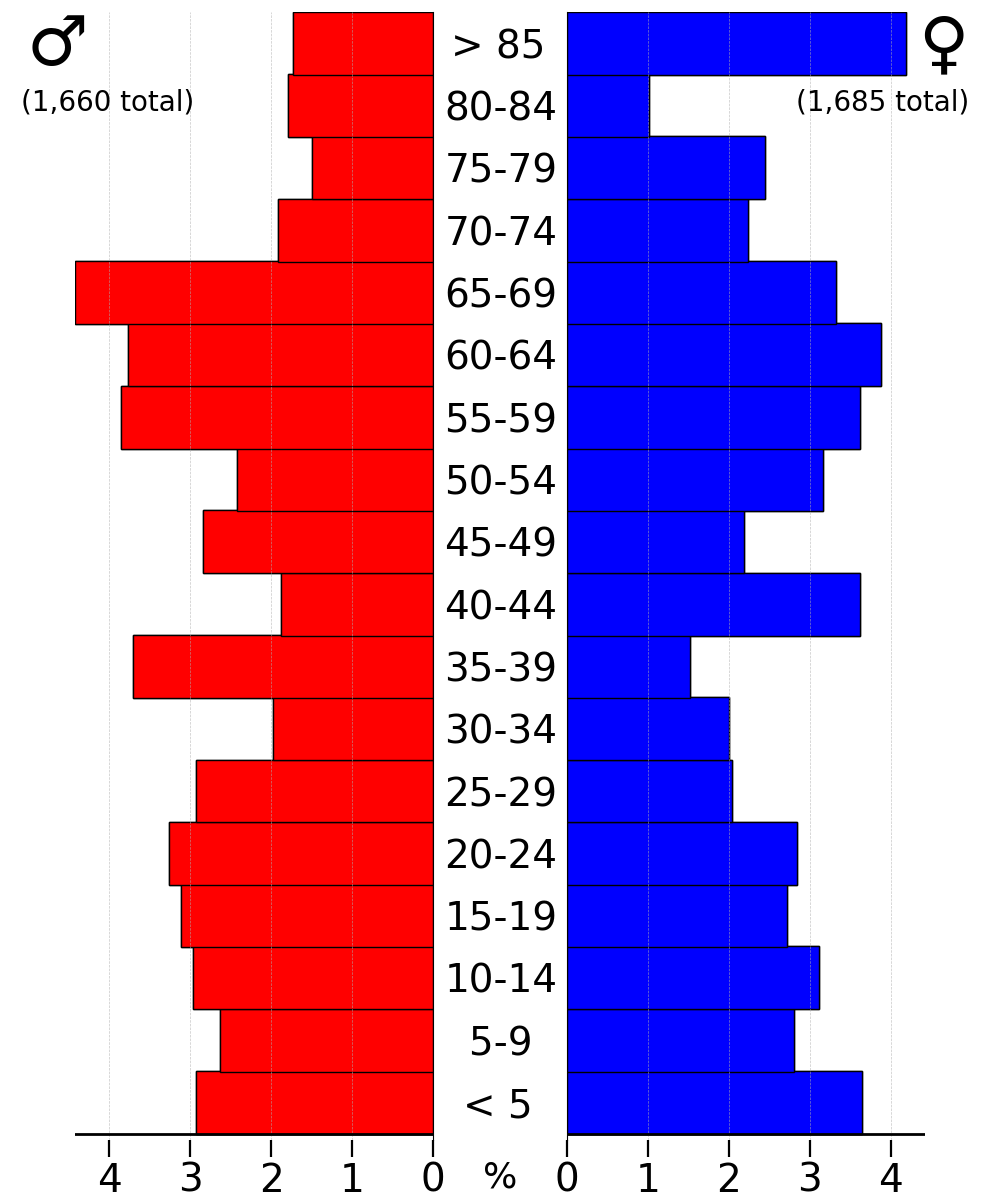
2022 US Census population pyramid for Traverse County, from ACS 5-year estimates

As of the 2000 census, there were 4,134 people, 1,717 households, and 1,129 families in the county. The population density was 7.2 per square mile (2.8/km^{2}). There were 2,199 housing units at an average density of 3.83 per square mile (1.48/km^{2}). The racial makeup of the county was 96.42% White, 0.02% Black or African American, 2.81% Native American, 0.27% Asian, 0.07% Pacific Islander, 0.05% from other races, and 0.36% from two or more races. 1.21% of the population were Hispanic or Latino of any race. 52.2% were of German, 13.0% Norwegian, 7.6% Swedish and 5.4% Irish ancestry.

There were 1,717 households, out of which 28.30% had children under the age of 18 living with them, 57.00% were married couples living together, 6.00% had a female householder with no husband present, and 34.20% were non-families. 32.00% of all households were made up of individuals, and 19.20% had someone living alone who was 65 years of age or older. The average household size was 2.34 and the average family size was 2.97.

The county population contained 25.30% under the age of 18, 5.60% from 18 to 24, 21.70% from 25 to 44, 21.20% from 45 to 64, and 26.20% who were 65 years of age or older. The median age was 43 years. For every 100 females there were 96.70 males. For every 100 females age 18 and over, there were 93.80 males.

The median income for a household in the county was $30,617, and the median income for a family was $39,655. Males had a median income of $29,821 versus $20,100 for females. The per capita income for the county was $16,378. About 9.30% of families and 12.00% of the population were below the poverty line, including 13.10% of those under age 18 and 10.80% of those age 65 or over.

== Communities ==
=== Cities ===
- Browns Valley
- Dumont
- Tintah
- Wheaton (county seat)

=== Unincorporated communities ===
- Boisberg
- Charlesville (partial)
- Collis
- Dakomin

=== Townships ===
- Arthur Township
- Clifton Township
- Croke Township
- Dollymount Township
- Folsom Township
- Lake Valley Township
- Leonardsville Township
- Monson Township
- Parnell Township
- Redpath Township
- Tara Township
- Taylor Township
- Tintah Township
- Walls Township
- Windsor Township

== Government and politics ==
Traverse County was historically a swing county, although in recent years it has swung substantially Republican. Since 1980 the county has selected the Republican Party candidate 58% of the time in national elections (as of 2024).

United States presidential election results for Traverse County, Minnesota
Year	Republican		Democratic		Third party(ies)	
Year	No.	%	No.	%	No.	%
1892	413	39.33%	317	30.19%	320	30.48%
1896	589	36.65%	963	59.93%	55	3.42%
1900	768	50.29%	720	47.15%	39	2.55%
1904	885	77.50%	247	21.63%	10	0.88%
1908	685	54.93%	514	41.22%	48	3.85%
1912	131	10.34%	561	44.28%	575	45.38%
1916	774	48.71%	779	49.02%	36	2.27%
1920	1,759	73.20%	550	22.89%	94	3.91%
1924	1,002	39.32%	202	7.93%	1,344	52.75%
1928	1,214	38.79%	1,899	60.67%	17	0.54%
1932	608	18.53%	2,633	80.23%	41	1.25%
1936	761	24.20%	2,297	73.06%	86	2.74%
1940	1,434	40.50%	2,094	59.14%	13	0.37%
1944	1,296	42.76%	1,721	56.78%	14	0.46%
1948	1,008	31.28%	2,151	66.74%	64	1.99%
1952	1,809	50.63%	1,756	49.15%	8	0.22%
1956	1,467	45.87%	1,724	53.91%	7	0.22%
1960	1,463	40.75%	2,122	59.11%	5	0.14%
1964	1,073	32.30%	2,247	67.64%	2	0.06%
1968	1,277	41.41%	1,669	54.12%	138	4.47%
1972	1,276	41.77%	1,744	57.09%	35	1.15%
1976	1,130	35.24%	2,020	62.99%	57	1.78%
1980	1,574	51.95%	1,258	41.52%	198	6.53%
1984	1,399	51.00%	1,325	48.30%	19	0.69%
1988	1,061	42.85%	1,399	56.50%	16	0.65%
1992	841	33.86%	1,053	42.39%	590	23.75%
1996	775	34.77%	1,135	50.92%	319	14.31%
2000	1,074	51.00%	884	41.98%	148	7.03%
2004	1,076	50.26%	1,026	47.92%	39	1.82%
2008	933	45.85%	1,043	51.25%	59	2.90%
2012	861	46.62%	943	51.06%	43	2.33%
2016	1,049	58.34%	630	35.04%	119	6.62%
2020	1,172	62.88%	661	35.46%	31	1.66%
2024	1,165	64.65%	597	33.13%	40	2.22%

County Board of Commissioners
Position	Name	District
Commissioner	Chad Metz	District 1
Commissioner	Kayla Schmidt	District 2
Commissioner	Mark Gail	District 3
Commissioner	Jerrel Olson	District 4
Commissioner	Dwight Nelson	District 5

State Legislature (2020–2022)
Position	Name	Affiliation	District
Senate	Torrey Westrom	Republican	District 12
House of Representatives	Jeff Backer	Republican	District 12A

U.S Congress (2020–2022)
Position	Name	Affiliation	District
House of Representatives	Michelle Fischbach	Republican	7th
Senate	Amy Klobuchar	Democrat	N/A
Senate	Tina Smith	Democrat	N/A

== See also ==
- National Register of Historic Places listings in Traverse County, Minnesota
